= 1961 Santos FC season =

Santos
1961 season
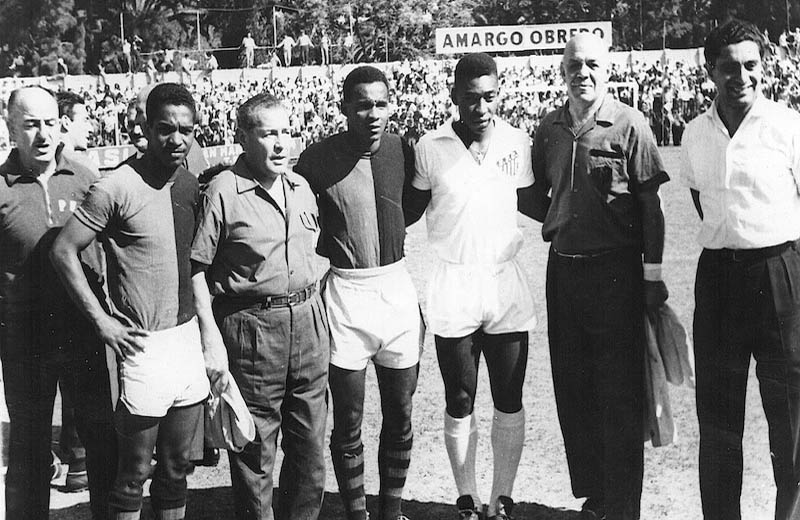
- Pelé (centre, in white) during a friendly against Newell's Old Boys in October 1961
- President: Athiê Jorge Coury
- Coach: Lula
- Stadium: Vila Belmiro
- Taça Brasil: Winners
- Campeonato Paulista: Winners
- Torneio Rio-São Paulo: 5th
- Top goalscorer: League: Pelé (7); All: Pelé (110)

The 1961 season was Santos Futebol Clube's forty-ninth in existence and the club's first consecutive season in the top flight of Brazilian football.

== Background ==
After finishing the 1959 Campeonato Paulista as runners-up, Santos failed to qualify for the 1960 Taça Brasil. The club would win the state league in 1960, which granted his qualification to the 1961's national championship.

== Players ==
=== Squad ===
Note: Flags indicate national team as defined under FIFA eligibility rules; some limited exceptions apply. Players may hold more than one non-FIFA nationality.

No.	Pos.	Nation	Player
—	GK	BRA	Carlindo
—	GK	BRA	Irno
—	GK	BRA	Laércio
—	GK	BRA	Lalá
—	GK	BRA	Odair Costa
—	GK	BRA	Silas
—	DF	BRA	Calvet
—	DF	ARG	Dalmo
—	DF	BRA	Décio Brito
—	DF	BRA	Feijó
—	DF	BRA	Figueiró
—	DF	BRA	Fioti
—	DF	BRA	Formiga
—	DF	BRA	Getúlio
—	DF	BRA	Jorge Trombada
—	DF	BRA	Mauro Ramos
—	DF	BRA	Olavo
—	DF	BRA	Pavão
—	DF	BRA	Zé Carlos
—	MF	BRA	Álvaro
—	MF	BRA	Brandão

No.	Pos.	Nation	Player
—	MF	BRA	Lima
—	MF	BRA	Mengálvio
—	MF	BRA	Ney Blanco
—	MF	BRA	Roberto
—	MF	BRA	Urubatão
—	MF	BRA	Zague
—	MF	BRA	Zito
—	FW	BRA	Bé
—	FW	BRA	Cabralzinho
—	FW	BRA	Coutinho
—	FW	BRA	Dorval
—	FW	BRA	Juninho
—	FW	BRA	Nenê
—	FW	BRA	Osvaldo
—	FW	BRA	Pagão
—	FW	BRA	Pelé
—	FW	BRA	Pepe
—	FW	ITA	Sormani
—	FW	BRA	Tite
—	FW	BRA	Zoca

Source: Acervo Santos FC

=== Statistics ===
==== Appearances and goals ====
Pos.	Nat	Name	Taça Brasil		Campeonato Paulista		Torneio Rio-São Paulo		Friendlies		Total	
Pos.	Nat	Name	Apps	Goals	Apps	Goals	Apps	Goals	Apps	Goals	Apps	Goals
GK	(Brazil)	Carlindo	0	0	0	0	0	0	0+1	0	1	0
GK	(Brazil)	Irno	0	0	0	0	0	0	1	0	1	0
GK	(Brazil)	Laércio	5	0	24+1	0	7	0	40	0	76	0
GK	(Brazil)	Lalá	0	0	0+1	0	5	0	3+14	0	23	0
GK	(Brazil)	Odair Costa	0	0	0	0	0	0	0+1	0	1	0
GK	(Brazil)	Silas	0+1	0	6+6	0	0	0	3+1	0	17	0
DF	(Brazil)	Calvet	5	0	17+1	0	11	0	22+3	1	59	1
DF	(Brazil)	Dalmo	5	0	28	0	10	0	42+1	1	86	1
DF	(Brazil)	Décio Brito	0	0	4+2	0	0	0	6+1	0	13	0
DF	(Brazil)	Feijó	0	0	0	0	0+1	0	1	0	2	0
DF	(Brazil)	Figueiró	2	0	2	0	0	0	2	0	6	0
DF	(Brazil)	Fioti	0	0	0	0	10	0	13+4	0	27	0
DF	(Brazil)	Formiga	0	0	11	0	2+2	0	16+14	0	45	0
DF	(Brazil)	Getúlio	0	0	22	0	2+2	0	27+1	0	54	0
DF	(Brazil)	Jorge Trombada	0	0	3	0	2+2	0	3+1	0	11	0
DF	(Brazil)	Mauro Ramos	5	0	26	0	11	0	43	0	85	0
DF	(Brazil)	Olavo	0+1	0	4	0	0	0	1+3	0	9	0
DF	(Brazil)	Pavão	0	0	0	0	0	0	1	0	1	0
DF	(Brazil)	Zé Carlos	0	0	0	0	0	0	9+3	0	12	0
MF	(Brazil)	Álvaro	0	0	0	0	1	0	0	0	1	0
MF	(Brazil)	Brandão	0	0	0	0	0	0	4+6	1	10	1
MF	(Brazil)	Lima	3	0	14+2	2	2	0	12+11	1	42	3
MF	(Brazil)	Mengálvio	3+1	0	17+2	0	12	1	42+1	7	77	8
MF	(Brazil)	Ney Blanco	0	0	0	0	1+1	0	3+12	1	17	1
MF	(Brazil)	Roberto	0	0	0	0	0	0	0+1	0	1	0
MF	(Brazil)	Urubatão	0	0	0	0	3+2	1	1+2	0	8	1
MF	(Brazil)	Zague	0	0	0+1	0	0	0	0+3	1	4	1
MF	(Brazil)	Zito	5	0	24	2	7	1	35+2	5	73	8
FW	(Brazil)	Bé	0	0	3+1	1	0	0	2+13	5	19	6
FW	(Brazil)	Cabralzinho	0	0	0	0	0	0	1+1	3	2	3
FW	(Brazil)	Coutinho	5	6	22+1	20	11	8	39+2	44	80	78
FW	(Brazil)	Dorval	5	1	27	8	12	3	46	17	90	29
FW	(Brazil)	Juninho	0	0	0	0	0	0	0+1	0	1	0
FW	(Brazil)	Nenê	0	0	0	0	1+3	1	1+3	1	8	2
FW	(Brazil)	Osvaldo	0	0	1	0	0	0	1+3	0	5	0
FW	(Brazil)	Pagão	0+2	0	5+6	5	0	0	15+16	7	43	12
FW	(Brazil)	Pepe	5	4	29	24	12	9	41	22	87	59
FW	(Brazil)	Pelé	5	7	26	47	7	9	33+3	47	74	110
FW	(Italy)	Sormani	0	0	0	0	4+5	0	2+26	5	37	5
FW	(Brazil)	Tite	2	0	14+2	3	0+3	0	7+20	2	48	5
FW	(Brazil)	Zoca	0	0	0	0	0+1	0	0+1	1	2	1

Source: Match reports in Competitive matches

==== Goalscorers ====
Ran	Pos	Nat	Name	Taça Brasil	Paulistão	Rio-SP	Friendlies	Total
1	FW	(Brazil)	Pelé	7	47	9	47	110
2	FW	(Brazil)	Coutinho	6	20	8	44	78
3	FW	(Brazil)	Pepe	4	24	9	22	59
4	FW	(Brazil)	Dorval	1	8	3	17	29
5	FW	(Brazil)	Pagão	0	5	0	7	12
6	MF	(Brazil)	Mengálvio	0	0	1	7	8
6	MF	(Brazil)	Zito	0	2	1	5	8
7	FW	(Brazil)	Bé	0	1	0	5	6
8	FW	(Brazil)	Tite	0	3	0	2	5
8	FW	(Italy)	Sormani	0	0	0	5	5
9	FW	(Brazil)	Cabralzinho	0	0	0	3	3
9	MF	(Brazil)	Lima	0	2	0	1	3
10	FW	(Brazil)	Nenê	0	0	1	1	2
11	MF	(Brazil)	Brandão	0	0	0	1	1
11	DF	(Brazil)	Calvet	0	0	0	1	1
11	DF	(Brazil)	Dalmo	0	0	0	1	1
11	MF	(Brazil)	Ney Blanco	0	0	0	1	1
11	MF	(Brazil)	Urubatão	0	0	1	0	1
11	MF	(Brazil)	Zague	0	0	0	1	1
11	FW	(Brazil)	Zoca	0	0	0	1	1

Source: Match reports in Competitive matches

== Competitions ==
=== Friendlies ===
==== Matches ====
6 January	Santos (Brazil)	1 – 2	(Brazil) Nacional-SP	Santos
	Nenê	Report	Wanderley	Stadium: Vila Belmiro; Referee: Alfredo Lauro Neto

8 January	Uberlândia (Brazil)	1 – 6	(Brazil) Santos	Uberlândia
	Hélio 87'	Report	43' Pepe; 77' 81' 89' Coutinho; 42' Pelé 88'	Referee: Juan de La Passion Arias

10 January	Santos (Brazil)	10 – 2	(Brazil) Guarani	Santos
	Mengálvio; Coutinho; Pelé; Dorval; Sormani	Report	Benê II	Stadium: Vila Belmiro; Referee: Mário Barreto Nogueira

- American tour

14 January	Colo-Colo (Chile)	1 – 3	(Brazil) Santos	Santiago
	Bello 78'	Report	34' 84' Pelé; 61' Dorval	Stadium: Estadio Nacional; Attendance: 46,005; Referee: Sérgio Bustamente

18 January	Colombia	1 – 2	(Brazil) Santos	Cali
	Aceros	Report	Pelé	Stadium: Pascual Guerrero; Attendance: 25,003; Referee: Salatiel Bonilla

22 January Costa Rica's Triangular	Saprissa (Costa Rica)	3 – 7	(Brazil) Santos	San José
	Feo Rojas; Gaban; Catato	Report	Coutinho; Ney; Pagão; Pelé	Stadium: Estadio Nacional; Attendance: 32,500~; Referee: Carlos Luiz Monge

25 January Costa Rica's Triangular	Herediano (Costa Rica)	0 – 3	(Brazil) Santos	San José
		Report	Pelé; Pagão; Dorval	Stadium: Estadio Nacional; Attendance: 28,000~; Referee: Staneley Monge

29 January	Guatemala	1 – 4	(Brazil) Santos	Guatemala City
	Tomás Gamboa	Report	Pelé; Coutinho; Pepe	Stadium: Estadio Mateos Flores; Attendance: 13,000~; Referee: Pablo Torrin Pérez

2 February Pentagonal Internacional de la Ciudad de México	Necaxa (Mexico)	4 – 3	(Brazil) Santos	Mexico City
	Dante Juárez 2' 78'; Agustín Peniche 10'; Ortiz 52'	Report	15' 62' Pepe; 31' Coutinho	Stadium: Olímpico Universitario; Attendance: 55,000~; Referee: Ramiro García

9 February Pentagonal Internacional de la Ciudad de México	Chivas Guadalajara (Mexico)	0 – 0	(Brazil) Santos	Mexico City
		Report		Stadium: Olímpico Universitario; Attendance: 50,000~; Referee: Fernando Buergo

12 February Pentagonal Internacional de la Ciudad de México	Oro Jalisco (Mexico)	2 – 2	(Brazil) Santos	Mexico City
	Mercado 18' 85'	Report	16' Pagão; 30' Calvet	Stadium: Olímpico Universitario; Attendance: 70,000~; Referee: Juan Rodríguez

16 February Pentagonal Internacional de la Ciudad de México	Independiente (Argentina)	1 – 4	(Brazil) Santos	Mexico City
	Garro 82'	Report	14' Zito; 55' Coutinho; 57' Dorval; 59' Pagão	Stadium: Olímpico Universitario; Attendance: 70,000~; Referee: Fernando Buergo

19 February Pentagonal Internacional de la Ciudad de Guadalajara	Chivas Guadalajara (Mexico)	2 – 6	(Brazil) Santos	Guadalajara
	Mellone 4'; Héctor Hernández 64'	Report	8' Mengálvio; 23' Coutinho; 30' 52' (pen.) Pepe; 48' Pagão; 63' Dorval	Stadium: Jalisco; Attendance: 50,000~; Referee: Fernando Buergo

22 February Pentagonal Internacional de la Ciudad de Guadalajara	Club América (Mexico)	2 – 6	(Brazil) Santos	Guadalajara
	Mercado 61'; Pavés 75'	Report	14' Pepe; 37' Dorval; 64' 74' Pelé; 82' Zito; 85' Coutinho	Stadium: Jalisco; Referee: Franco Ramiro García

24 February Pentagonal Internacional de la Ciudad de Guadalajara	Atlas (Mexico)	0 – 2	(Brazil) Santos	Guadalajara
		Report	20' Dorval; 31' Coutinho	Stadium: Jalisco; Referee: Rafael Valenzuela

26 February Pentagonal Internacional de la Ciudad de Guadalajara	America-RJ (Brazil)	3 – 3	(Brazil) Santos	Guadalajara
	Quarentinha 18' 47'; Antoninho 30'	Report	43' Coutinho; 70' Pepe; 80' Dorval	Stadium: Jalisco; Referee: Fernando Buergo

25 March	Boca Juniors (Argentina)	2 – 1	(Brazil) Santos	Buenos Aires
	Paulo Valentim (pen.)	Almanaque Santos FC	Coutinho	Stadium: La Bombonera; Referee: Velarde

26 March Racing's 58th anniversary	Racing Club (Argentina)	2 – 2	(Brazil) Santos	Córdoba
	Borges; Pizeti	Almanaque Santos FC	Sormani; Dorval	Stadium: Presidente Perón; Referee: João Etzel Filho

5 April	Atlético Mineiro (Brazil)	1 – 3	(Brazil) Santos	Belo Horizonte
	Fuzil 40'		55' 77' Pelé; 60' Coutinho	Stadium: Independência; Referee: Oltem Ayres de Abreu

21 April	Brasília autonomous team (Seleção de Brasília) (Brazil)	0 – 4	(Brazil) Santos	Brasília
		Report	Sormani; Coutinho; Zoca; Tite; (red card) 68' Ney	Stadium: Campo do Guará; Referee: Oltem Ayres de Abreu

- European tour

16 May	Bayern Munich (Germany)	2 – 3	(Brazil) Santos	Munich
	Grosser; Milutinović	Report	Pepe; Coutinho; Sormani	Stadium: Grunewalls; Attendance: 45,000~; Referee: Joseph Kandelbinder

18 May	La Gantoise (Belgium)	2 – 1	(Brazil) Santos	Gentbrugge
	Del Mulle	Report	Zito	Stadium: Jules Ottenstadion; Attendance: 18,000~; Referee: Gerard Versyp

24 May	Anderlecht (Belgium)	2 – 2	(Brazil) Santos	Anderlecht
	Stockman	Report	Coutinho; Bé	Stadium: Émile Versé Stadium; Attendance: 10,000~; Referee: Joseph Hannet

26 May	Standard Liège (Belgium)	4 – 4	(Brazil) Santos	Liège
	Claessen; Paeschen	Report	Coutinho; Dorval; Pepe	Stadium: Stade de Sclessin; Attendance: 12,000~; Referee: Raymond Espineaux

1 June	Basel (Switzerland)	2 – 8	(Brazil) Santos	Basel
20:00	Stäuble 48'; Hügi 55'	Summary	4' 27' 36' 62' 72' Coutinho; 70' 83' 89' Pelé	Stadium: St. Jakob Stadium; Attendance: 14,000; Referee: Helbling Uznach

1 June	Wolfsburg (Germany)	3 – 6	(Brazil) Santos	Wolfsburg
	Ruege; Shrader	Summary	Pelé; Bé; Coutinho; Mengálvio	Stadium: VfL-Stadion am Elsterweg; Attendance: 8,000~; Referee: Heinrich Hoeffel

4 June	Antwerp autonomous team (Belgium)	4 – 4	(Brazil) Santos	Antwerp
	Van Gool; Coppens; Raskin	Summary	Coutinho; Dorval; Pepe; Zito	Stadium: Bosuilstadion; Attendance: 20,000~; Referee: Marcel Raemakers

7 June	Racing Paris (France)	1 – 6	(Brazil) Santos	Marseille
	Bollini	Summary	Pepe; Pelé; Brandão; Coutinho	Stadium: Stade Vélodrome; Attendance: 30,000~; Referee: Marcel Bois

9 June	Lyon (France)	2 – 6	(Brazil) Santos	Lyon
	Rambert; Mahi	Summary	Pelé; Pepe; Mengálvio (o.g.) Bossy	Stadium: Stade de Gerland; Attendance: 20,000~; Referee: Pierre Schwinte

11 June	Israel XI	1 – 3	(Brazil) Santos	Ramat Gan
	Stelmach	Summary	Pelé; Coutinho; Dorval	Stadium: Ramat Gan Stadium; Attendance: 40,000; Referee: Czovikoansk

13 June Paris Tournament	Racing Paris (France)	4 – 5	(Brazil) Santos	Paris
	Grillet; Docus; Sénac; Van Sam	Summary	Pelé; Pepe; Dorval; Coutinho	Stadium: Parc des Princes; Attendance: 40,000~; Referee: François Faucheux

15 June Paris Tournament	Benfica (Portugal)	3 – 6	(Brazil) Santos	Paris
	Eusébio	Summary	Pelé; Pepe; Coutinho; Lima	Stadium: Parc des Princes; Attendance: 36,364; Referee: Pierre Achinte

18 June Italy Tournament	Juventus (Italy)	0 – 2	(Brazil) Santos	Turin
		Summary	70' Pelé; 87' Dorval	Stadium: Stadio Comunale di Torino; Attendance: 60,000~; Referee: Giulio Campanati

21 June Italy Tournament	Roma (Italy)	0 – 5	(Brazil) Santos	Rome
		Summary	5' Mengálvio; 22' 23' Pelé; 28' Dorval; 61' Zito	Stadium: Stadio Olimpico; Attendance: 80,000~; Referee: Cesare Jonni

24 June Italy Tournament	Internazionale (Italy)	1 – 4	(Brazil) Santos	Milan
	Bolchi 25'	Summary	7' 51' Pepe; 35' Coutinho; 88' Pelé	Stadium: San Siro; Attendance: 110,000~; Referee: Carlo Gambarotta

26 June	Karlsruhe (Germany)	6 – 8	(Brazil) Santos	Karlsruhe
	Späth; Wischnowsky; Witlatschil; Herrmann; Reitgaßl	Summary	Pelé; Coutinho; Sormani; Dorval	Stadium: Wildparkstadion; Attendance: 35,000~; Referee: Karl Kuch

28 June	AEK Athens (Greece)	0 – 3	(Brazil) Santos	Athens
		Summary	36' Pelé; 40', 44' Coutinho	Stadium: AEK Stadium; Attendance: 16,823; Referee: Dimosthenis Stathatos

30 June	Panathinaikos (Greece)	2 – 3	(Brazil) Santos	Athens
	Theofanis	Summary	Pelé; Coutinho	Stadium: Leoforos Alexandras Stadium; Attendance: 24,000~; Referee: Dimosthenis Stathatos

4 July	Olympiacos (Greece)	2 – 1	(Brazil) Santos	Athens
	Poseidon; Surunes	Summary	(o.g.) Stefanakos	Stadium: Leoforos Alexandras Stadium; Attendance: 26,000~; Referee: Aristidis Ioannidis

25 August	Nacional (Uruguay)	1 – 0	(Brazil) Santos	Montevideo
	Rodrigo	Almanaque Santos FC		Stadium: Estadio Centenario; Attendance: 50,000~; Referee: Pablo Vitor Vaga

30 August	Olímpico-SC (Brazil)	0 – 8	(Brazil) Santos	Blumenau
		Almanaque Santos FC	25' 30' 50' 58' 88' Pelé; 27' 29' 60' Cabralzinho	Stadium: Aderbal Ramos da Silva; Referee: Josafato Serra

20 September	Londrina (Brazil)	1 – 2	(Brazil) Santos	Londrina
	Nilson	Almanaque Santos FC	Bé; Pagão	Stadium: VGD; Referee: Carmelito Vol

28 September	Racing Club (Argentina)	2 – 4	(Brazil) Santos	Buenos Aires
	Sosa 4'; Pizzuti 32'	Summary	22' 87' Pelé; 20' Bé; 38' Dorval	Stadium: Estadio Tomás Adolfo Ducó; Attendance: 45,000~; Referee: Juan Brozi

1 October	Newell's Old Boys (Argentina)	1 – 1	(Brazil) Santos	Rosario
	Ivo Diogo	Summary	Pelé	Stadium: Parque de la Independencia; Attendance: 45,000~; Referee: Spietto

4 October	Colo-Colo (Chile)	2 – 3	(Brazil) Santos	Santiago
	Soto Mura 3'; Álvarez 69'	Summary	20' Pelé; 22' Tite; 52' Pagão	Stadium: Estadio Nacional de Santiago; Attendance: 37,649; Referee: Cláudio Vicuna

8 October	Colo-Colo (Chile)	1 – 3	(Brazil) Santos	Santiago
	Cruz 20'	Summary	53' Dalmo; 72' Zague; 89' Pelé	Stadium: Estadio Nacional de Santiago; Attendance: 24,490; Referee: Domingo Massaro

15 November	Flamengo (Brazil)	1 – 1	(Brazil) Santos	Rio de Janeiro
	Gérson (pen.)	Almanaque Santos FC	Pelé	Stadium: Maracanã; Attendance: 94,739; Referee: Romualdo Arpi Filho

=== Taça Brasil ===
==== Results summary ====
Overall								Home						Away					
Pld	W	D	L	GF	GA	GD	Pts	W	D	L	GF	GA	GD	W	D	L	GF	GA	GD
5	3	1	1	18	6	+12	10	2	0	1	11	3	+8	1	1	0	7	3	+4

==== Semifinals ====
===== Matches =====
11 November 1	America-RJ	2 – 6	Santos	Rio de Janeiro
	Nilo 5'; João Carlos 59'	Report	26' Coutinho; 53' 73' Pelé; 76' 80' 85' Pepe	Stadium: São Januário; Referee: Olten Aires de Abreu

19 November 2	Santos	0 – 1	America-RJ	Santos
	Pelé (red card)	Report	38' Fontoura; (red card) Lourival Lorenzi	Stadium: Vila Belmiro; Referee: Armando Marques

21 November 3	Santos	6 – 1	America-RJ	São Paulo
	Pelé 34' 53'; Coutinho 51' 89'; Dorval 67'; Pepe 74' (pen.)	Report	8' Quarentinha	Stadium: Pacaembu; Referee: Joaquim Gonçalves da Silva

==== Finals ====
===== Matches =====
22 December 1	Bahia	1 – 1	Santos	Salvador
	Mário 49'	Report	2' Coutinho	Stadium: Fonte Nova; Attendance: 41,893; Referee: Olten Aires de Abreu

27 December 2	Santos	5 – 1	Bahia	Santos
	Pelé 24' 30' 31'; Coutinho 33' 60'	Report	89' (pen.) Florisvaldo	Stadium: Vila Belmiro; Attendance: 18,662; Referee: Baymonilso Lisboa

=== Campeonato Paulista ===
Team	Pld	W	D	L	GF	GA	GD	Pts
Santos (C)	30	25	3	2	113	33	80	53
Palmeiras	30	22	6	2	82	29	53	50
São Paulo	30	18	5	7	73	40	33	41
Portuguesa	30	19	2	9	77	56	21	40
Ferroviária	30	15	8	7	65	45	20	38

==== Matches ====
9 July 1	Santos	1 – 0	Comercial-RP	Santos
	Lima 64'	Report		Stadium: Vila Belmiro; Referee: Eduardo Sáfadi

16 July 2	Portuguesa Santista	0 – 0	Santos	Santos
		Report		Stadium: Ulrico Mursa; Referee: João Etzel Filho

23 July 3	Taubaté	0 – 0	Santos	Taubaté
		Report		Stadium: Campo do Bosque; Referee: Stefan Walter Glanz

30 July 4	Santos	2 – 1	Palmeiras	Santos
	Dorval 2'; Lima 87'	Report	61' Zeola	Stadium: Vila Belmiro; Referee: Romualdo Arppi Filho

6 August 5	Santos	4 – 0	Jabaquara	Santos
	Coutinho 5'; Pelé 40'; Dorval 50' 69'	Report		Stadium: Vila Belmiro; Referee: Olten Aires de Abreu

9 August 6	Santos	3 – 1	Guarani	Santos
	Coutinho 20' 38'; Pelé 67' (pen.)	Report	51' Bataglia	Stadium: Vila Belmiro; Referee: Stefan Walter Glanz

13 August 7	Noroeste	1 – 7	Santos	Bauru
	Davi 6'	Report	10' 50' 78' Pelé; 42' 75' Dorval; 59' 67' Pepe	Stadium: Alfredão; Referee: Romualdo Arppi Filho

16 August 8	Corinthians	1 – 5	Santos	São Paulo
	Joaquinzinho 46' (pen.)	Report	23' 76' 79' Pepe; 34' Pelé; 20' Coutinho	Stadium: Pacaembu; Referee: Romualdo Arppi Filho

19 August 9	Santos	6 – 1	XV de Piracicaba	Santos
	Pelé 27' 73' 83'; Dorval 50'; Coutinho 56' 75'	Report	87' Fifi	Stadium: Vila Belmiro; Referee: Stefan Walter Glanz

3 September 10	São Paulo	3 – 6	Santos	São Paulo
	Gonçalo 6'; Benê 15'; Agenor 55'	Report	3' 30' 70' 84' Pelé; 22' Pepe; 73' Dorval	Stadium: Morumbi; Attendance: 21,128; Referee: Olten Aires de Abreu

6 September 11	Santos	10 – 1	Juventus	Santos
	Pelé 3' 31' 48' 77' 82' (pen.); Pepe 47' 55' 66' 85'; Dorval 54'	Report	81' Amaral	Stadium: Vila Belmiro; Referee: Stefan Walter Glanz

10 September 12	Botafogo	0 – 3	Santos	Ribeirão Preto
		Report	7' 60' (pen.) Pepe; 10' Pelé	Stadium: Santa Cruz; Referee: Romualdo Arppi Filho

13 September 13	Santos	5 – 1	Esportiva Guaratinguetá	Santos
	Pelé; Pepe	Report	Haroldo	Stadium: Vila Belmiro; Referee: Stefan Walter Glanz

17 September 14	Santos	6 – 1	Portuguesa	Santos
	Pelé 15' 21' 49' 88'; Bé 23'; Zito 57'	Report	66' Jair	Stadium: Vila Belmiro; Referee: Stefan Walter Glanz

24 September 15	Ferroviária	0 – 1	Santos	Araraquara
		Report	61' Pepe	Stadium: Fonte Luminosa; Referee: Olten Aires de Abreu

11 October 16	Jabaquara	2 – 1	Santos	Santos
	Vicente; Jair	Report	Pagão	Stadium: Vila Belmiro; Referee: Olten Aires de Abreu

15 October 17	Santos	4 – 1	Botafogo	Santos
	Pepe 15'; Coutinho 29' 36'; Pelé 88'	Report	52' Silva	Stadium: Vila Belmiro; Referee: Stefan Walter Glanz

18 October 18	Santos	5 – 2	Portuguesa Santista	Santos
	Coutinho 11' 88'; Pepe 44' (pen.); Pelé 56' 83'	Report Report	7' Teotônio; 74' (o.g.) Mauro	Stadium: Vila Belmiro; Referee: João Etzel Filho

22 October 19	Guarani	1 – 2	Santos	Campinas
	Cido 5'	Report	22' Coutinho; 86' Tite	Stadium: Brinco de Ouro; Referee: Stefan Walter Glanz

28 October 20	Portuguesa	1 – 3	Santos	São Paulo
	Silvio 35'	Report	11' Coutinho; 52' 80' Pelé	Stadium: Canindé; Referee: João Etzel Filho

1 November 21	Juventus	1 – 3	Santos	São Paulo
	Luizinho 45'	Report	35' Pelé; 59' 86' Pagão	Stadium: Pacaembu; Referee: Benedito Francisco

4 November 22	Santos	4 – 2	Taubaté	Santos
	Pelé 9'; Coutinho 39'; Pepe 69' (pen.) 87'	Report	17' Tek; 48' Miranda	Stadium: Vila Belmiro; Referee: João Etzel Filho

8 November 23	Esportiva Guaratinguetá	0 – 4	Santos	Pirassununga
		Report	21' 39' 84' Pelé; 23' (o.g.) Bolar	Stadium: Belarmino del Nero; Referee: Olten Aires de Abreu

26 November 24	Comercial-RP	1 – 4	Santos	Ribeirão Preto
	Alemão 48' (pen.)	Report	4' Zito; 50' Coutinho; 52' Pepe; 73' Pelé	Stadium: Palma Travassos; Referee: João Etzel Filho

29 November 25	Palmeiras	3 – 2	Santos	São Paulo
	Geraldo II 5' 82'; Américo 44'	Report	10' Pelé; 89' Coutinho	Stadium: Pacaembu; Referee: Olten Aires de Abreu

3 December 26	Santos	1 – 1	Corinthians	Santos
	Pepe 78'	Report	58' Rafael	Stadium: Vila Belmiro; Referee: Romualdo Arppi Filho

6 December 27	Santos	4 – 2	Noroeste	Santos
	Pelé 23' 52'; Pepe 77' (pen.); Pagão 89'	Report	8' Batista; 37' Toninho	Stadium: Vila Belmiro; Referee: Romualdo Arppi Filho

10 December 28	XV de Piracicaba	2 – 7	Santos	Piracicaba
	Geraldo 36'; Valdir 44'	Report	25' (pen.) Pepe; 56' 62' Pelé; 68' 88' 90' Coutinho; Tite 82'	Stadium: Roberto Gomes Pedrosa; Referee: Stefan Walter Glanz

13 December 29	Santos	6 – 2	Ferroviária	Santos
	Pelé 11' 65'; Tite 15'; Pagão 51'; Pepe 67' 80'	Report	58' Beni; 89' Peixinho	Stadium: Vila Belmiro; Referee: Stefan Walter Glanz

16 December 30	Santos	4 – 1	São Paulo	Santos
	Coutinho 16' 22' 44' 59'	Report	5' (pen.) Dias	Stadium: Vila Belmiro; Referee: Stefan Walter Glanz

=== Torneio Rio-São Paulo ===
==== First stage ====
===== Matches =====
2 March 1	Santos	5 – 1	Vasco da Gama	Santos
	Coutinho; Dorval; Mengálvio; Pepe; Zito	Report	Lorico	Stadium: Vila Belmiro; Referee: Alberto da Gama Malcher

5 March 2	Fluminense	1 – 3	Santos	Rio de Janeiro
	Jaburú 90'	Report	4' 40' Pelé; 52' Pepe	Stadium: Maracanã; Attendance: 39,990; Referee: Olten Aires de Abreu

11 March 3	Flamengo	1 – 7	Santos	Rio de Janeiro
	Henrique 53'	Report	22' 57' Pepe; 31' 49' 51' 75' Pelé; 55' Dorval	Stadium: Maracanã; Attendance: 90,218; Referee: Olten Aires de Abreu

15 March 4	Santos	1 – 0	São Paulo	São Paulo
	Coutinho 55'	Report		Stadium: Pacaembu; Attendance: 28,887

19 March 5	Santos	3 – 0	Portuguesa	São Paulo
	Coutinho 35' 85' 88'	Report		Stadium: Pacaembu

23 March 6	Santos	1 – 1	Palmeiras	São Paulo
	Nenê 60'	Report	7' Humaitá	Stadium: Pacaembu; Referee: Anacleto Pietrobom

29 March 7	Corinthians	2 – 0	Santos	São Paulo
	Miranda 30'; Rafael 51'	Report		Stadium: Pacaembu

1 April 8	Santos	4 – 2	Botafogo	São Paulo
	Pelé; Coutinho; Dorval	Report	Édison; China	Stadium: Pacaembu; Referee: Anacleto Pietrobom

10 April 9	Santos	6 – 1	America-RJ	Santos
	Pepe; Coutinho; Pelé; Urubatão	Report	Antoninho	Stadium: Vila Belmiro; Referee: Armando Marques

==== Final stage ====
===== Matches =====
13 April 1	Vasco da Gama	2 – 1	Santos	Rio de Janeiro
	Sabará; Wilson Moreira	Report	Pepe	Stadium: Maracanã; Attendance: 74,155; Referee: Mário Barreto Nogueira

19 April 2	Santos	1 – 5	Flamengo	São Paulo
	Coutinho 87'	Report	18' 44' 66' Gérson; 33' 48' Dida	Stadium: Pacaembu; Referee: Alberto da Gama Malcher

23 April 3	Santos	1 – 2	Botafogo	São Paulo
	Pepe	Report	Quarentinha; Amarildo	Stadium: Pacaembu
