= Lula (football manager) =

Brazilian football manager (1922–1972)

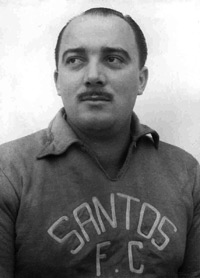
- Lula in 1962

Personal information
- Full name: Luís Alonso Pérez
- Date of birth: 1 March 1922
- Place of birth: Santos, São Paulo, Brasil
- Date of death: 15 June 1972 (aged 50)
- Place of death: São Paulo, Brasil

Managerial career
- Years: Team
- 19XX–1951: Portuguesa Santista (youth)
- 1952–1954: Santos (youth)
- 1952: Santos (interim)
- 1954–1966: Santos
- 1967: Portuguesa Santista
- 1967–1968: Corinthians
- 1968–1969: Portuguesa
- 1971: Santo André

Luís Alonso Pérez, also known as Lula (22 February 1922 – 15 June 1972), was a Brazilian football manager, notably managing Santos from 1954 to 1966.

Lula is known as one of the most successful Brazilian football managers.

== Career ==
Born in Santos, São Paulo, Lula worked as a taxicab, a baker and a milkman. He started to work as a manager with amateur clubs in his hometown, Palmeirinha and Americana. He subsequently joined Portuguesa Santista, in charge of the club's youth setup.

In January 1949, Lula signed his first contract with Santos FC, being the subdirector of the club's amateur sides. On 13 May 1952, he was named in charge of the club's youth teams.

Lula acted as an interim manager for two matches in 1952, as Aymoré Moreira was in charge of the São Paulo official team. He later became Moreira's assistant while he was also in charge of the club's amateur sides, and on 2 June 1954, he replaced Italian Giuseppe Ottina as the first team manager.

Lula's first match in charge occurred three days later, a 3–2 win against Botafogo at the Maracanã Stadium. He led the club to the following year's Campeonato Paulista title, after a 20-year drought.

Lula was often described as the responsible for bringing together the team who was known as Os Santásticos; he made Pelé a regular starter from 1957, promoted Pagão and Pepe from the youth setup, brought Coutinho from lowly XV de Piracicaba and approved Dorval on a trial, after the latter was rejected by a number of clubs. In the 1960s, the club signed Calvet, Lima, Mengálvio and Zito, all recommended by the manager.

Lula left Peixe in the end of the 1966 season; although it is mainly attributed to the club's second place in the Taça Brasil, some reported altercations with Pelé are also attributed to the manager's departure. He left the club after 945 matches in charge, with 619 wins, 144 draws and 182 defeats.

In 1967, Lula took over Portuguesa Santista before being appointed manager of Corinthians in November of that year. In charge for only 35 matches with the latter club, he helped the side to defeat former club Santos on 6 March 1968, ending an 11-year hoodoo.

Lula later worked for Portuguesa and Santo André in the early 1970s.

== Death ==
Lula died on 15 June 1972, having a generalized infection due to a kidney transplant, worsened due to his hypertension.

== Managerial statistics ==
Managerial record by team and tenure
Team	Nat	From	To	Record							
Team	Nat	From	To	G	W	D	L	GF	GA	GD	Win %
Santos	(Brazil)	1954	1966	945	619	144	182	1,638	774	+864	65.50
Portuguesa Santista	(Brazil)	1967	1967	26	7	5	14	24	38	−14	26.92
Corinthians	(Brazil)	1967	1968	35	21	6	8	61	36	+25	60.00
Portuguesa	(Brazil)	1968	1969	49	16	15	18	67	75	−8	32.65
Santo André	(Brazil)	1971	1971	9	2	1	6	9	15	−6	22.22
Career total				1,064	665	171	228	1,798	940	+858	62.50

== Honours ==
Santos

- Taça Brasil: 1961, 1962, 1963, 1964, 1965
- Campeonato Paulista: 1955, 1956, 1958, 1960, 1961, 1962, 1964, 1965
- Intercontinental Cup: 1962, 1963
- Copa Libertadores: 1962, 1963
- Torneio Rio-São Paulo: 1959, 1963, 1964, 1966

== See also ==
- List of football managers with the most matches
