= Mauro Ramos =

Brazilian footballer

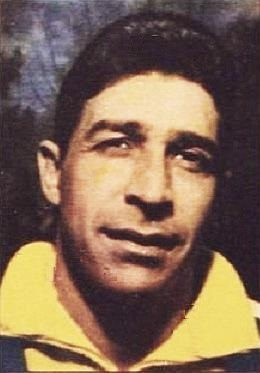
- Mauro Ramos in 1962

Personal information
- Full name: Mauro Ramos de Oliveira
- Date of birth: 30 August 1930
- Place of birth: Poços de Caldas, Brazil
- Date of death: 18 September 2002 (aged 72)
- Place of death: Poços de Caldas, Brazil
- Height: 1.79 m (5 ft 10 in)
- Position: Centre-back

Senior career*
Years	Team	Apps	(Gls)
- Caldense
1947	Sanjoanense		
1948–1959	São Paulo		
1960–1967	Santos		
1967–1968	Toluca		

International career
1948–1965	Brazil	28	(0)

Managerial career
- Deportivo Oro
- 1971: Coritiba
- 1971–1972: Santos
- 1973–1974: Jalisco
- 1984: Coritiba
Medal record
Men's Football
Representing Brazil
FIFA World Cup
Winner	1958 Sweden
Winner	1962 Chile
South American Championship
Winner	1949 Brazil
Runner-up	1959 Argentina
- * Club domestic league appearances and goals

Mauro Ramos de Oliveira (30 August 1930 – 18 September 2002), known as Mauro Ramos or simply Mauro, was a Brazilian professional association footballer. He played as a centre-back for São Paulo FC, Santos FC and the Brazil national team.

Regarded as one of the best Brazilian centre-backs of all time, he was praised throughout his career for his aerial ability and tackling.

Italian sports journalist Gianni Brera believed Mauro to be the best sweeper in the history of the game.

== Club career ==
Born in Poços de Caldas, Minas Gerais, Mauro began his career playing for amateur clubs in his hometown in the 1940s. Notably representing Caldense, he joined São Paulo FC in 1948 from Sanjoanense.

Signed as a replacement to club idol Armando Renganeschi, Mauro immediately became a starter and relegated Renganeschi to the bench. He represented the club in 489 matches, scoring two goals.

Ahead of the 1960 season, Mauro moved to Santos FC for a fee of five million cruzeiros. He was also a first-choice at his new club, being a part of the team who was widely known as Os Santásticos.

In 1967, Mauro moved abroad for the first time in his career and joined Mexican side Toluca. He retired with the club in the following year, aged 38, due to a groin injury.

== International career ==
Mauro received 28 caps with the Brazil national team. He was an unplaying member of the Brazil squad at the 1954 World Cup. He was also an unplaying member of the squad that won the 1958 World Cup. At the 1962 World Cup he finally made his World Cup debut and as team captain he lifted the World Cup Trophy after victory in the final over Czechoslovakia.

== Managerial career ==
After starting it out at C.D. Oro, Mauro was appointed manager of Santos in 1971. He left the club in the following year.

Mauro also took over Coritiba in 1971 and 1984.

== Death ==
Mauro died on 18 September 2002, due to an intestinal cancer.

== Honours ==
=== Club ===
São Paulo

- Campeonato Paulista: 1948, 1949, 1953, 1957
- Small Club World Cup: 1955

Santos

- Campeonato Paulista: 1960, 1961, 1962, 1964, 1965
- Torneio Rio–São Paulo: 1963, 1964, 1966
- Campeonato Brasileiro: 1961, 1962, 1963, 1964, 1965
- Copa Libertadores: 1962, 1963
- Intercontinental Cup: 1962, 1963

Toluca

- Mexican Primera División: 1967–68

=== International ===
Brazil

- FIFA World Cup: 1958, 1962
- Copa America: 1949
- Roca Cup: 1963

=== Individual ===
- Campeonato Paulista Team of the Tournament: 1948, 1949, 1950, 1951, 1952
- Campeonato Paulista Player of the Tournament: 1952
- Torneio Rio-São Paulo Team of the Tournament: 1952, 1953
