= Chico Formiga =

Brazilian footballer and manager (1930-2012)

Personal information
- Full name: Francisco Ferreira de Aguiar
- Date of birth: 11 November 1930
- Place of birth: Araxá, Brazil
- Date of death: 22 May 2012 (aged 81)
- Place of death: São Vicente, Brazil
- Height: 1.76 m (5 ft 9 in)
- Position: Centre back

Youth career
- 1946–1950: Cruzeiro
- 1950: Santos

Senior career*
Years	Team	Apps	(Gls)
1950–1957	Santos		
1957–1959	Palmeiras		
1959–1962	Santos		

International career
1955–1959	Brazil	18	(0)

Managerial career
- 1978–1979: Santos
- 1981–1982: São Paulo
- 1982–1984: Santos
- 1984–1986: Al-Ettifaq
- 1986–1987: Santos
- 1987: Corinthians
- 1988: Cruzeiro
- 1988: Portuguesa
- 1990: Santo André
- 1990: Universidad Guadalajara
- 1991: Catanduvense
- 1991: Goiás
- 1993: América Mineiro
- 1994: América Mineiro
- 1996: América Mineiro
- 1998: Oita Trinita
- 2000: Palestra São Bernardo
- * Club domestic league appearances and goals

Francisco Ferreira de Aguiar (11 November 1930 – 22 May 2012), known as Chico Formiga or simply Formiga, was a Brazilian footballer and manager. Mainly a central defender, he could also play as a defensive midfielder.

Throughout his playing career, Formiga was mainly associated with Santos. As a manager, he was in charge of top tier sides Santos, São Paulo, Corinthians, Cruzeiro and América Mineiro.

== Playing career ==
=== Club ===
Born in Araxá, Minas Gerais, Formiga joined Santos' youth setup in May 1950, but made his first team debut the following month after being promoted to the main squad by manager Artigas.

Formiga became a starter at Peixe in the 1952 season, winning the Campeonato Paulista twice for the club in 1955 and 1956. At the start of the 1957 season, he moved to Palmeiras for a fee of ₢$2 million plus the transfers of Laércio and Jair Rosa Pinto.

Formiga returned to Santos in 1959, taking part in the Os Santásticos squad that won two Copa Libertadores and two Intercontinental Cups. He retired in December 1962, after playing 410 matches and scoring twice for the club during his two spells.

=== International ===
Formiga played 18 matches for the Brazil national football team, making his full international debut on 20 September 1955 in a 2–1 win against Chile at the Pacaembu Stadium. He was initially called up to the 1958 FIFA World Cup, but had to withdraw due to an injury.

== Managerial career ==
Shortly after retiring, Formiga remained at Santos to work in the club's youth categories. He took over the first team for the first time in 1978, winning the year's Paulistão, which ended only in 1979.

Formiga also worked at São Paulo between 1981 and 1982 before returning to Santos, where he was manager in another two periods. He was subsequently in charge of Corinthians, Cruzeiro, Portuguesa, Santo André, Catanduvense, Goiás and América Mineiro in his home country, aside from a period at Mexico's Universidad Guadalajara in 1990 and Japan's Oita Trinita in 1998.

From 1984 until 1986, Formiga was in charge of Saudi Arabian club Al-Ettifaq. He was sacked by the club on 13 January 1986.

In 2001, after being in charge of Palestra de São Bernardo in the previous campaign, Formiga returned to Peixe as a youth football coordinator. He left the club after a change in the organization chart.

== Death ==
Formiga died on 22 May 2012, aged 81, due to a heart attack.

== Career statistics ==
=== International ===
Brazil
Year	Apps	Goals
1955	2	0
1956	11	0
1959	5	0
Total	18	0

== Honours ==
=== Player ===
Santos

- Campeonato Paulista: 1955, 1956, 1960, 1961, 1962
- Taça Brasil: 1961, 1962
- Copa Libertadores: 1962, 1963
- Intercontinental Cup: 1962, 1963

=== Manager ===
Santos

- Campeonato Paulista: 1978

São Paulo

- Campeonato Paulista: 1981
