= 1962 São Paulo FC season =

São Paulo
1962 season
- Chairman: Laudo Natel
- Manager: Osvaldo Brandão
- Torneio Rio-São Paulo: Runners-up
- Campeonato Paulista: Runners-up

The 1962 football season was São Paulo's 33rd season since club's existence.

== Statistics ==
=== Overall ===
Games played	71 (7 Torneio Rio-São Paulo, 30 Campeonato Paulista, 34 Friendly match)
Games won	41 (2 Torneio Rio-São Paulo, 19 Campeonato Paulista, 20 Friendly match)
Games drawn	16 (4 Torneio Rio-São Paulo, 5 Campeonato Paulista, 7 Friendly match)
Games lost	14 (1 Torneio Rio-São Paulo, 6 Campeonato Paulista, 7 Friendly match)
Goals scored	158
Goals conceded	98
Goal difference	+60
Best result	5–0 (A) v Once Caldas - Friendly match - 1962.10.20; 5–0 (H) v Prudentina - Campeonato Paulista - 1962.11.08
Worst result	1–5 (A) v Corinthians - Friendly match - 1962.06.03
Most appearances	
Top scorer	

Source: São Paulo FC

== Friendlies ==
January 28 National	Ourinhense	2–4	São Paulo	Ourinhos
	Goal		Goal

February 1 National	Nacional	1–4	São Paulo	São Paulo
	Goal		Goal	Stadium: Estádio Nicolau Alayon (Comendador Souza)

February 17 National	São Paulo (Brazil)	6–2	Brazil	São Paulo
	Cido 14', 48'; Célio 21', 87'; Prado 27'; Benê 42'		Ademar Pantera 30'; Paulinho Ferreira 69'	Stadium: Pacaembu; Referee: Catão Montes Júnior (BRA)

March 25 National	Comercial	3–3	São Paulo	Ribeirão Preto
	Goal		Goal	Stadium: Estádio Costa Coelho

April 7 National	Juventus	2–1	São Paulo	São Paulo
	Goal		Goal	Stadium: Estádio Conde Rodolfo Crespi (Rua Javari)

April 11 National	Ponte Preta	1–1	São Paulo	Campinas
	Goal		Goal	Stadium: Estádio Moisés Lucarelli

May 1 Taça Cidade dos Passarinhos	Arapongas	1–3	São Paulo	Arapongas
	Goal		Goal

May 13 National	Palmeiras	0–1	São Paulo	Ribeirão Preto
			Goal	Stadium: Estádio Costa Coelho

May 20 National	Votuporanguense	0–1	São Paulo	Votuporanga
			Goal	Stadium: Estádio Plínio MarÍn

May 23 National	Portofelicense	1–6	São Paulo	Porto Feliz
	Goal		Goal	Stadium: Estádio Julien Fouque

June 13 National	Ranchariense	0–2	São Paulo	Rancharia
			Goal

June 17 National	Catanduva	5–4	São Paulo	Catanduva
	Goal		Goal

June 21 National	Nitro-Química	1–5	São Paulo	São Paulo
	Goal		Goal

June 23 Taça Simca	Oswaldo Cruz	2–5	São Paulo	Osvaldo Cruz
	Goal		Goal	Stadium: Estádio Breno Ribeiro do Val

June 28 National	Mirassol	0–2	São Paulo	Mirassol
			Goal

July 1 National	Francana	1–2	São Paulo	Franca
	Goal		Goal

July 14 National	Ferroviária	1–1	São Paulo	Botucatu
	Goal		Goal	Stadium: Estádio Doutor Acrísio Paes Cruz

August 8 National	Internacional	1–1	São Paulo	Bebedouro
	Goal		Goal	Stadium: Estádio Arnaldo Bulle

August 22 National	Barretos	5–2	São Paulo	Barretos
	Goal		Goal

October 3 International	Deportivo Cali (Colombia)	0–3	(Brazil) São Paulo	Cali
			Goal	Stadium: Estadio Olímpico Pascual Guerrero

October 7 International	Independiente Medellín (Colombia)	2–2	(Brazil) São Paulo	Medellín
	Goal		Goal	Stadium: Estadio Atanasio Girardot

October 10 International	América (Colombia)	1–2	(Brazil) São Paulo	Cali
	Goal		Goal	Stadium: Estadio Olímpico Pascual Guerrero

October 12 International	Millonarios (Colombia)	3–3	(Brazil) São Paulo	Bogotá
	Goal		Goal	Stadium: Estadio Nemesio Camacho (El Campín)

October 14 International	Santa Fe (Colombia)	1–2	(Brazil) São Paulo	Bogotá
	Goal		Goal	Stadium: Estadio Nemesio Camacho (El Campín)

October 17 International	Independiente Medellín (Colombia)	2–5	(Brazil) São Paulo	Medellín
	Goal		Goal	Stadium: Estadio Atanasio Girardot

October 20 International	Once Caldas (Colombia)	0–5	(Brazil) São Paulo	Manizales
			Goal

October 23 International	Atlético Junior (Colombia)	1–2	(Brazil) São Paulo	Barranquilla
	Goal		Goal

=== Troféu Lourenço Fló Junior ===
January 25 National	São Paulo	1–2	Corinthians	São Paulo
	Goal		Goal	Stadium: Estádio Cícero Pompeu de Toledo (Morumbi)

February 10 National	Corinthians	4–2	São Paulo	São Paulo
	Goal		Goal	Stadium: Estádio Cícero Pompeu de Toledo (Morumbi)

=== Taça São Paulo ===
April 15 National	Usina São João	0–1	São Paulo	Araras
			Goal	Stadium: Engenho Grande

April 18 National	São Paulo	3–1	Usina São João	São Paulo
	Goal		Goal	Stadium: Estádio Municipal Paulo Machado de Carvalho (Pacaembu)

May 6 National	Noroeste	1–3	São Paulo	Bauru
	Goal		Goal	Stadium: Estádio Ubaldo Medeiros

May 9 National	São Paulo	1–1	Noroeste	São Paulo
	Goal		Goal	Stadium: Estádio Municipal Paulo Machado de Carvalho (Pacaembu)

May 27 National	São Paulo	2–0	Corinthians	São Paulo
	Goal			Stadium: Estádio Cícero Pompeu de Toledo (Morumbi)

June 3 National	Corinthians	5–1	São Paulo	São Paulo
	Goal		Goal	Stadium: Estádio Alfredo Schürig (Parque São Jorge)

== Official competitions ==
=== Torneio Rio-São Paulo ===
February 21 Group stage 1	São Paulo	2–2	Portuguesa	São Paulo
	Goal		Goal	Stadium: Estádio Municipal Paulo Machado de Carvalho (Pacaembu)

February 27 Group stage 2	São Paulo	1–1	Corinthians	São Paulo
	Goal		Goal	Stadium: Estádio Municipal Paulo Machado de Carvalho (Pacaembu)

March 3 Group stage 3	São Paulo	2–1	Palmeiras	São Paulo
	Goal		Goal	Stadium: Estádio Municipal Paulo Machado de Carvalho (Pacaembu)

March 8 Tie-break match	Palmeiras	1–1	São Paulo	São Paulo
	Goal		Goal	Stadium: Estádio Municipal Paulo Machado de Carvalho (Pacaembu)

March 11 Second stage 1	Botafogo	2–1	São Paulo	Rio de Janeiro
	Goal		Goal	Stadium: Estádio Jornalista Mário Filho (Maracanã)

March 14 Second stage 2	São Paulo	2–1	Palmeiras	São Paulo
	Goal		Goal	Stadium: Estádio Municipal Paulo Machado de Carvalho (Pacaembu)

March 17 Second stage 3	São Paulo	2–2	Flamengo	São Paulo
	Goal		Goal	Stadium: Estádio Municipal Paulo Machado de Carvalho (Pacaembu)

==== Record ====
Final Position	Points	Matches	Wins	Draws	Losses	Goals For	Goals Away	Win%
2nd	8	7	2	4	1	11	10	57%

=== Campeonato Paulista ===
July 8 1	São Paulo	2–0	Jabaquara	São Paulo
	Goal			Stadium: Estádio Cícero Pompeu de Toledo (Morumbi)

July 22 2	Prudentina	2–5	São Paulo	Presidente Prudente
	Goal		Goal	Stadium: Estádio Félix Ribeiro Marcondes

July 29 3	Portuguesa	0–0	São Paulo	São Paulo
				Stadium: Estádio Municipal Paulo Machado de Carvalho (Pacaembu)

August 5 4	São Paulo	3–1	Guarani	São Paulo
	Goal		Goal	Stadium: Estádio Cícero Pompeu de Toledo (Morumbi)

August 12 5	Noroeste	1–2	São Paulo	Bauru
	Goal		Goal	Stadium: Estádio Ubaldo Medeiros

August 16 6	São Paulo	1–4	Ferroviária	São Paulo
	Goal		Goal	Stadium: Estádio Municipal Paulo Machado de Carvalho (Pacaembu)

August 19 7	XV de Piracicaba	2–1	São Paulo	Piracicaba
	Goal		Goal	Stadium: Estádio Roberto Gomes Pedroza

August 26 8	São Paulo	1–1	Corinthians	São Paulo
	Goal		Goal	Stadium: Estádio Cícero Pompeu de Toledo (Morumbi)

September 2 9	Santos	3–3	São Paulo	Santos
	Goal		Goal	Stadium: Estádio Urbano Caldeira (Vila Belmiro)

September 9 10	Esportiva	1–3	São Paulo	Guaratinguetá
	Goal		Goal	Stadium: Estádio Benedito Meirelles

September 12 11	São Paulo	4–0	Comercial	São Paulo
	Goal			Stadium: Estádio Municipal Paulo Machado de Carvalho (Pacaembu)

September 16 12	São Paulo	0–1	Taubaté	São Paulo
			Goal	Stadium: Estádio Cícero Pompeu de Toledo (Morumbi)

September 20 13	Palmeiras	2–3	São Paulo	São Paulo
	Goal		Goal	Stadium: Estádio Municipal Paulo Machado de Carvalho (Pacaembu)

September 23 14	Botafogo	1–1	São Paulo	Ribeirão Preto
	Goal		Goal	Stadium: Estádio Luis Pereira

September 29 15	São Paulo	1–1	Juventus	São Paulo
	Goal		Goal	Stadium: Estádio Municipal Paulo Machado de Carvalho (Pacaembu)

October 26 16	Jabaquara	1–3	São Paulo	Santos
	Goal		Goal	Stadium: Estádio Urbano Caldeira (Vila Belmiro)

October 31 17	São Paulo	3–0	Botafogo	São Paulo
	Goal			Stadium: Estádio Conde Rodolfo Crespi (Rua Javari)

November 4 18	Ferroviária	2–0	São Paulo	Araraquara
	Goal			Stadium: Estádio Doutor Adhemar de Barros (Fonte Luminosa)

November 8 19	São Paulo	5–0	Prudentina	São Paulo
	Goal			Stadium: Estádio Municipal Paulo Machado de Carvalho (Pacaembu)

November 11 20	Taubaté	3–4	São Paulo	Taubaté
	Goal		Goal	Stadium: Estádio Silva Bastos

November 15 21	Guarani	0–1	São Paulo	Campinas
			Goal	Stadium: Estádio Brinco de Ouro da Princesa

November 18 22	São Paulo	3–0	Juventus	São Paulo
	Goal			Stadium: Estádio Municipal Paulo Machado de Carvalho (Pacaembu)

November 22 23	São Paulo	5–1	Noroeste	São Paulo
	Goal		Goal	Stadium: Estádio Municipal Paulo Machado de Carvalho (Pacaembu)

November 25 24	São Paulo	1–0	Portuguesa	São Paulo
	Goal			Stadium: Estádio Cícero Pompeu de Toledo (Morumbi)

November 29 25	São Paulo	2–1	XV de Piracicaba	São Paulo
	Goal		Goal	Stadium: Estádio Municipal Paulo Machado de Carvalho (Pacaembu)

December 2 26	Corinthians	3–2	São Paulo	São Paulo
	Goal		Goal	Stadium: Estádio Municipal Paulo Machado de Carvalho (Pacaembu)

December 5 27	São Paulo	2–5	Santos	São Paulo
	Goal		Goal	Stadium: Estádio Municipal Paulo Machado de Carvalho (Pacaembu)

December 8 28	Comercial	0–1	São Paulo	Ribeirão Preto
			Goal	Stadium: Estádio Costa Coelho

December 13 29	São Paulo	1–0	Palmeiras	São Paulo
	Goal			Stadium: Estádio Municipal Paulo Machado de Carvalho (Pacaembu)

December 16 30	São Paulo	3–0	Esportiva	São Paulo
	Goal			Stadium: Estádio Cícero Pompeu de Toledo (Morumbi)

==== Record ====
Final Position	Points	Matches	Wins	Draws	Losses	Goals For	Goals Away	Win%
2nd	43	30	19	5	6	67	35	71%
