= Tite (footballer, born 1930) =

Brazilian footballer and manager (1930–2004)

Personal information
- Full name: Augusto Vieira de Oliveira
- Date of birth: 4 June 1930
- Place of birth: Campos dos Goytacazes, Brazil
- Date of death: 26 August 2004 (aged 74)
- Place of death: Santos, Brazil
- Position: Winger

Youth career
- 1942–1947: Goytacaz
- 1947–1950: Fluminense

Senior career*
Years	Team	Apps	(Gls)
1950–1951	Fluminense		
1951–1957	Santos		
1958–1959	Corinthians		
1960–1963	Santos		

International career
1957	Brazil	3	(1)
- * Club domestic league appearances and goals

Augusto Vieira de Oliveira (4 June 1930 – 26 August 2004), commonly known as Tite, was a Brazilian footballer who played as a left winger.

Tite had his playing career mainly associated with Santos, being a part of the Os Santásticos team.

== Club career ==
Born in Campos dos Goytacazes, Rio de Janeiro, Tite began his career with the amateur sides of hometown club Goytacaz. In 1947 he moved to Fluminense, but after seeing little chances of playing in the first team due to the presence of Telê Santana, he joined Santos in 1951.

After making his debut at the club in May 1951, Tite became a regular starter for Peixe before the breakthrough of Pepe, who played in the same position. He signed with Corinthians in 1958, but returned to Santos in 1960, being a part of the Os Santásticos team and winning several trophies before his retirement in 1963.

== International career ==
Tite played three matches for the Brazil national football team in 1957, scoring the winner on his debut on 11 June, in a 2–1 friendly win over Portugal at the Maracanã Stadium.

== Death ==
Tite died on 26 August 2004, aged 74, after struggling with lung cancer.

== Career statistics ==
=== International ===
Brazil
Year	Apps	Goals
1957	3	1
Total	3	1

== Honours ==
Santos

- Campeonato Paulista: 1955, 1956, 1960, 1961, 1962
- Torneio Rio – São Paulo: 1959, 1963
- Taça Brasil: 1961, 1962, 1963
- Copa Libertadores: 1962, 1963
- Intercontinental Cup: 1962, 1963
