= Mengálvio =

Brazilian footballer

Personal information
- Full name: Mengálvio Pedro Figueiró
- Date of birth: 17 October 1939 (age 87)
- Place of birth: Laguna, Brazil
- Position: Midfielder

Youth career
- Barriga Verde

Senior career*
Years	Team	Apps	(Gls)
1957–1960	Aimoré		
1960–1969	Santos	371	(28)
1968	→ Grêmio (loan)		
1969	Millonarios		

International career
1962	Brazil	13	(1)

Managerial career
- 1978: Santos (interim)
Medal record
Men's Football
Representing Brazil
FIFA World Cup
Winner	1962 Chile
- * Club domestic league appearances and goals

Mengálvio Pedro Figueiró (born 17 October 1939 in Laguna, Santa Catarina), simply known as Mengálvio, is a Brazilian retired footballer who played as a midfielder.

He earned 13 caps and scored 1 goal for the Brazil national football team. He was part of the 1962 FIFA World Cup winning squad, but he did not play any matches during the tournament.

Whilst at Santos he won the 1962 Copa Libertadores, playing in all three matches of the final against Penarol. In all he played 371 games for Santos, scoring 28 times.

== Honours ==
Santos

- Campeonato Paulista: 1960, 1961, 1962, 1964, 1965, 1967
- Torneio Rio–São Paulo: 1963, 1964, 1966
- Taça Brasil: 1961, 1962, 1963, 1964, 1965
- Copa Libertadores: 1962, 1963
- Intercontinental Cup: 1962, 1963

Brazil

- FIFA World Cup: 1962
