= Dorval (footballer) =

Brazilian footballer (1935–2021)

Personal information
- Full name: Dorval Rodrigues
- Date of birth: 26 February 1935
- Place of birth: Porto Alegre, Brazil
- Date of death: 26 December 2021 (aged 86)
- Place of death: Santos, Brazil
- Position: Winger

Youth career
- Internacional
- 1950–1954: Grêmio

Senior career*
Years	Team	Apps	(Gls)
1954–1956	Força e Luz		
1956–1964	Santos		
1957	→ Juventus-SP (loan)		
1964	Racing Club	25	(4)
1965–1967	Santos		
1967	Palmeiras	18	(1)
1968–1970	Atlético Paranaense		
1971	Carabobo		
1972	Saad		

International career
1959–1963	Brazil	13	(1)
- * Club domestic league appearances and goals

Dorval Rodrigues (26 February 1935 – 26 December 2021), simply known as Dorval, was a Brazilian footballer who played mainly as a right winger.

== Club career ==
Born in Porto Alegre, Rio Grande do Sul, Dorval represented Internacional and Grêmio as a youth. After failing to make his breakthrough, he moved to lowly locals Grêmio Esportivo Força e Luz, where he made his senior debut.

In October 1956, Dorval signed a contract with Santos, after spending some months on trial at the club. He began the 1957 season on loan at Juventus-SP, but returned to Santos after three months as a replacement to Alfredinho, who signed for Grêmio.

Dorval subsequently established himself as a regular starter for Peixe, being a part of the Os Santásticos squad which won several titles and was widely known in the whole world. In 1964, he was sold to Argentine side Racing Club, but returned to Santos in 1965 after the club failed to pay his transfer fee.

Dorval left Santos in 1967, and joined Palmeiras. After having little success with his new club, he moved to Atlético Paranaense in 1968, where he won the 1970 Campeonato Paranaense.

In 1972, after one season with Venezuela's Carabobo, Dorval retired at the age of 37, after playing for Saad. For Santos alone, he scored 194 goals in 612 matches.

== International career ==
Dorval played 13 matches for the Brazil national team, being called up for the 1959 South American Championship in Argentina and making his full international debut on 10 March 1959, in a 2–2 draw against Peru at the Monumental de Núñez. His only goal for the national side occurred on 17 September of that year, in a 7–0 routing of Chile at the Maracanã Stadium.

== Death ==
Dorval died on 26 December 2021, at the age of 86 in a hospital in Santos.

== Career statistics ==
Appearances and goals by national team and year
National team	Year	Apps	Goals
Brazil	1959	6	1
Brazil	1963	7	0
Total		13	1

Scores and results list Brazil's goal tally first, score column indicates score after each Dorval goal.

List of international goals scored by Dorval Rodrigues
No.	Date	Venue	Opponent	Score	Result	Competition
1	17 September 1959	Maracanã, Rio de Janeiro, Brazil	Chile	2–0	7–0	Bernardo O'Higgins Cup

== Honours ==
Santos

- Campeonato Paulista: 1958, 1960, 1961, 1962, 1964, 1965
- Torneio Rio – São Paulo: 1959, 1963, 1964, 1966
- Taça Brasil: 1961, 1962, 1963, 1964, 1965
- Copa Libertadores: 1962, 1963
- Intercontinental Cup: 1962, 1963

Atlético Paranaense

- Campeonato Paranaense: 1970
