= Irno Lubke =

Brazilian footballer

Irno
Personal information
- Full name: Irno Lubke
- Date of birth: 23 December 1934
- Place of birth: Encantado, Brazil
- Date of death: 23 May 1969 (aged 34)
- Place of death: Carazinho, Brazil
- Position: Goalkeeper

Senior career*
| Years | Team | Apps | (Gls) |
| 1953–1955 | Nacional-RS | | |
| 1955–1957 | Veterano (Carazinho) | | |
| 1958–1960 | Cruzeiro-RS | | |
| 1960–1961 | Santos | | |
| 1961–1963 | Grêmio | 45 | (0) |
| 1963–1965 | Pelotas | | |

International career
| 1960 | Brazil | 3 | (0) |
- * Club domestic league appearances and goals as of 18 February 2024

Irno Lubke (23 December 1934 – 23 May 1969), was a Brazilian professional footballer who played as a goalkeeper.

== Career ==
Irno played for Nacional de Porto Alegre, Veterano de Carazinho, Cruzeiro, Santos and Grêmio. He played alongside Pelé at Santos FC and made 45 appearances for Grêmio. He ended his career at EC Pelotas, where he was city champion and is considered a great idol.

Irno also made 3 appearances for the Brazil national team in total, during the 1960 Panamerican Championship.

== Honours ==
Santos

- Campeonato Paulista: 1960, 1961
- Taça Brasil: 1961

Grêmio

- Campeonato Gaúcho: 1962
- Campeonato Sul-Brasileiro: 1962

Pelotas

- Campeonato Citadino de Pelotas: 1965
- Copa Waldemar Fetter: 1965
