= Zito (footballer, born 1932) =

Brazilian footballer (1932–2015)

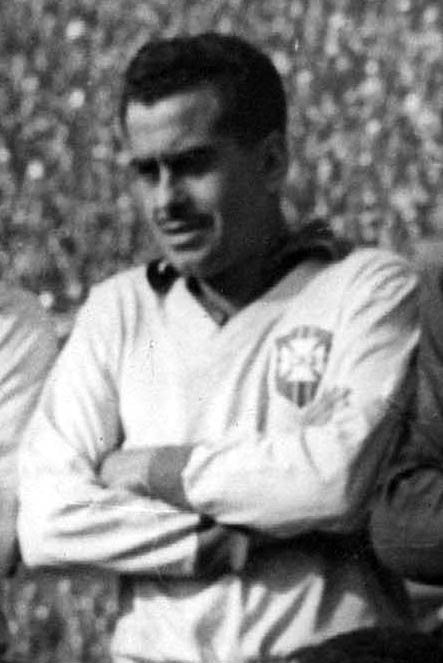
- Zito in 1962

Personal information
- Full name: José Ely de Miranda
- Date of birth: 8 August 1932
- Place of birth: Roseira, São Paulo, Brazil
- Date of death: 14 June 2015 (aged 82)
- Place of death: Santos, São Paulo, Brazil
- Position: Midfielder

Youth career
- 1948–1950: Roseira

Senior career*
Years	Team	Apps	(Gls)
1950–1952	Taubaté	117	(41)
1952–1967	Santos	727	(57)
Total		844	(98)

International career
1955–1966	Brazil	52	(3)
Medal record
Men's Football
Representing Brazil
FIFA World Cup
Winner	1958 Sweden
Winner	1962 Chile
South American Championship
Runner-up	1957 Peru
Runner-up	1959 Argentina
- * Club domestic league appearances and goals

José Ely de Miranda (8 August 1932 – 14 June 2015), commonly known as Zito, was a Brazilian footballer who played as a midfielder. He is regarded as one of the biggest idols of Santos FC, the club he represented for 15 years, captaining a side including Pelé to domestic and international successes. He was also part of the Brazilian squads which won the World Cup in 1958 and 1962.

After his retirement as a player, Zito remained at Santos as a director and youth coordinator, developing several young future international players.

== Early life ==
Born in Roseira, São Paulo, Zito initially intended to become a schoolteacher, and attended technical schools in his hometown, before pursuing a career as a footballer.

== Playing career ==
Zito joined Santos in 1952, after finishing his formation at hometown amateur club Roseira FC, and spending two years at Taubaté. He made his debut for Peixe on 29 June 1952 in a 3–1 friendly win against Madureira.

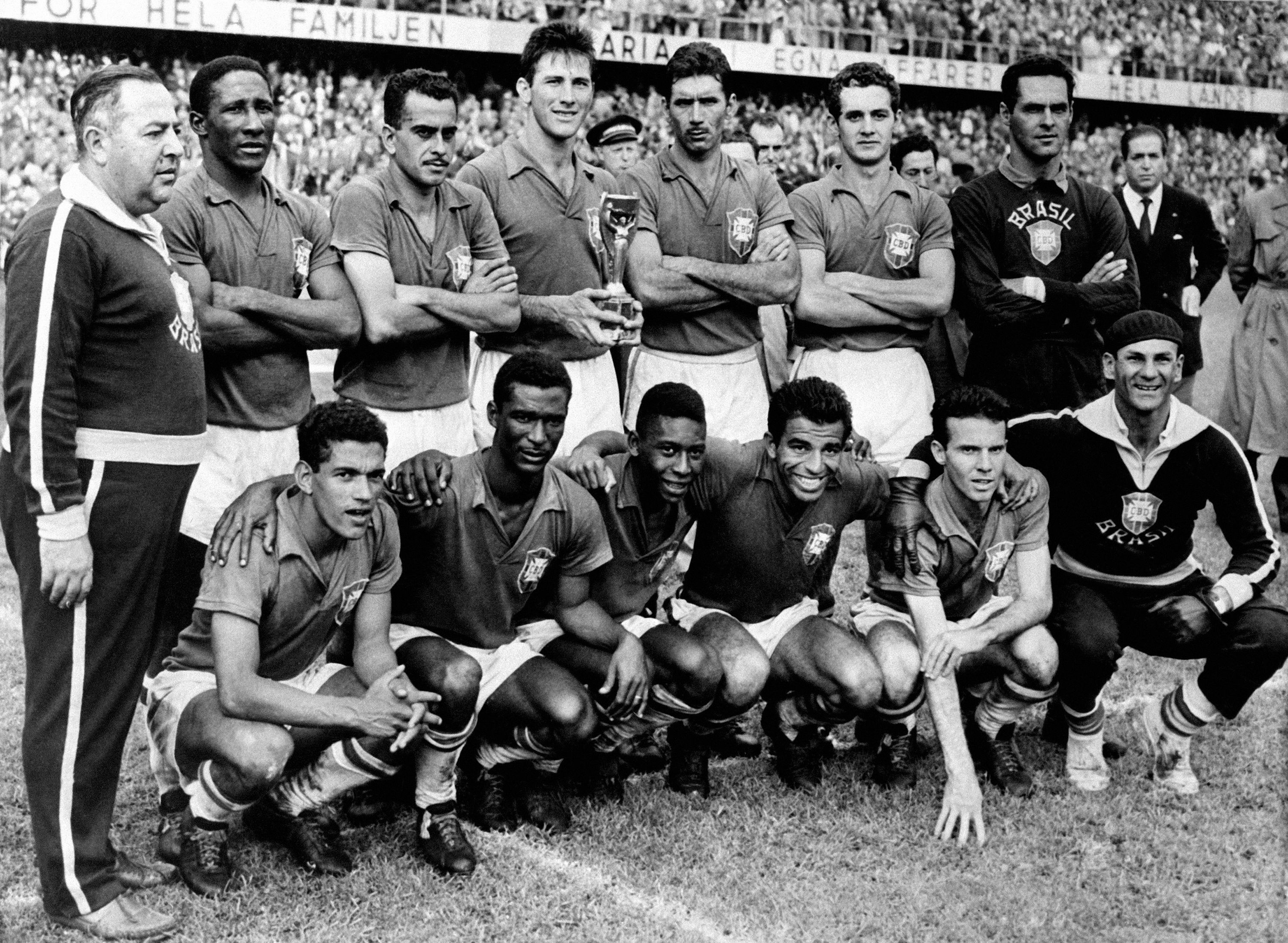
Zito (standing, third from left) lining up for the 1958 FIFA World Cup final

Zito appeared regularly for Santos in the following 15 years, playing 733 games and scoring 57 goals. He was the captain of the Os Santásticos team of the late 1950s and 1960s, playing alongside Pelé, Pepe and other Brazilian stars.

Zito was nicknamed Gerente (manager in Portuguese) by the media during his playing days, due to helping the manager Lula while outfields. Despite missing the two last games of 1963 Intercontinental Cup due to an injury, he acted as Lula's assistant during both matches as his team won the second title in a row.

Zito played his last match on 7 November 1967, a 5–0 win against a mix between Ferroviário and Fortaleza at the Estádio Presidente Vargas.

At international level, he earned 52 caps for Brazil. He partnered Didi in midfield, and was part of the squad which won the 1958 FIFA World Cup final against hosts Sweden; after starting the tournament as a reserve, he finished it as an undisputed starter. In the 1962 edition in Chile, he was named in the Team of the Tournament. In the final of that tournament, Zito headed Brazil into the lead as they came from behind to win 3–1 against Czechoslovakia with Pelé absent through injury.

== Style of play ==
Considered a strong midfielder, and known for his leadership, Zito usually played in a supporting role as a wing-half or half-back, serving as a defensive foil to his more offensive-minded teammates. An intelligent and highly organised player, he was known for his ability to win back possession with his tackling, and subsequently set the tempo in midfield through his movement off the ball and precise passing; although he was competent in possession, he preferred to play the ball to other more creative and skilful midfielders rather than carry it forward himself. He was also capable of starting attacking plays after winning the ball by quickly distributing the ball forward with simple, yet neat and efficient passes.

== Life after football ==
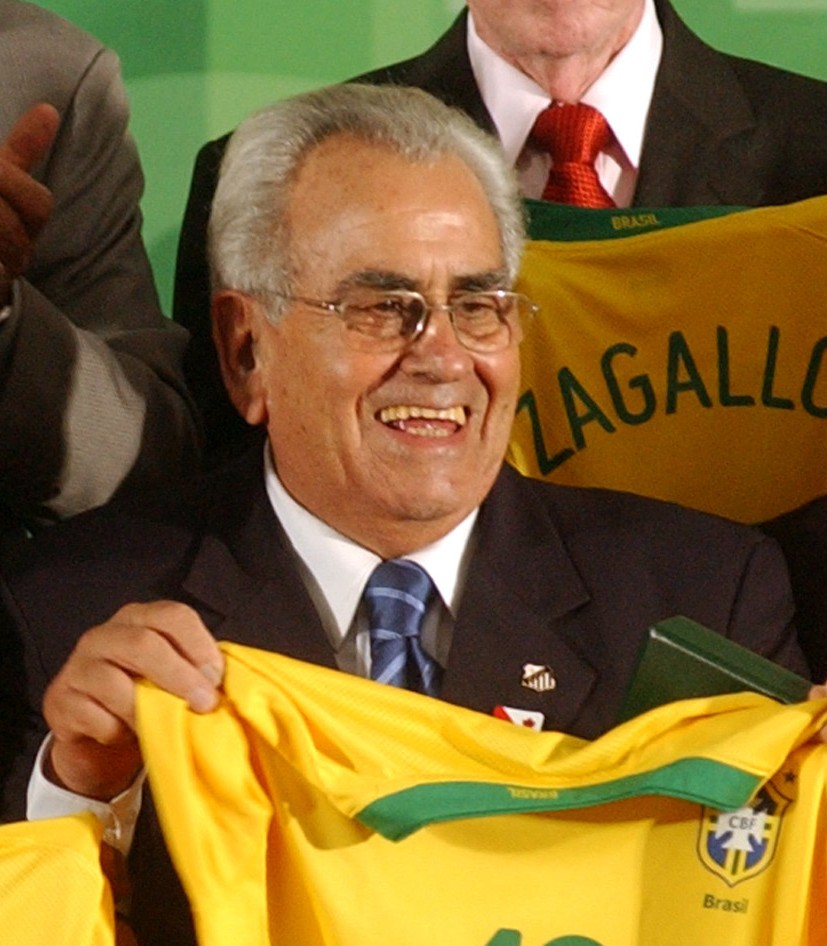
Zito in 2008

After retiring Zito was a vice-president at Santos between 1978 and 1982. After one year away from the club, he was named director of football by president Milton Teixeira, but left the post in 1987. In 2000, he was named a youth coordinate, helping the club to promote youngsters Robinho and Diego to the first team.

Zito was credited with bringing 11-year-old Neymar to the club in 2003. With Gabriel, he was also the scout who saw the player and brought him to the club's youth system.

== Death ==
Zito suffered from Alzheimer's disease and had memory lapses. Following a stroke the year before, Zito died on 14 June 2015 aged 82 in Santos, São Paulo.

In his honour, Santos decided to use the "Z" letter in the captain's armband (instead of the regular "C" used by most teams) from 2015 onwards.

== Honours ==
Santos'

- Campeonato Paulista: 1955, 1956, 1958, 1960, 1961, 1962, 1964, 1965,1967
- Torneio Rio-São Paulo: 1959, 1963, 1964, 1966
- Taça Brasil: 1961, 1962, 1963, 1964, 1965
- Copa Libertadores: 1962, 1963
- Intercontinental Cup: 1962, 1963

Brazil

- FIFA World Cup: 1958, 1962

Individual

- FIFA World Cup All-Star Team: 1962
- World Soccer World XI: 1962
