= 1957 Campeonato Paulista =

Campeonato Paulista – Série A1
- Season: 1957
- Champions: São Paulo
- Relegated: Linense
- Matches played: 371
- Goals scored: 1,363 (3.67 per match)
- Best Player: Pelé (Santos)
- Top goalscorer: Pelé (Santos) – 36 goals
- Biggest home win: Santos 9-1 Ypiranga (September 25, 1957)
- Biggest away win: Linense 0-7 Noroeste (July 7, 1957)
- Highest scoring: Jabaquara 6-4 Santos (July 31, 1957); XV de Piracicaba 6-4 Guarani (August 25, 1957); Santos 9-1 Ypiranga (September 25, 1957); Guarani 8-2 Ferroviária (January 22, 1958)

The 1957 Campeonato Paulista da Primeira Divisão, organized by the Federação Paulista de Futebol, was the 56th season of São Paulo's top professional football league. São Paulo won the title for the 8th time. Linense was relegated. The top scorer was Pelé from Santos with 36 goals, including 17 of those goals in the Blue Series. In 1957, Pelé started his streak of being the league season's top scorer, which continued unbroken until 1965.

== Championship ==
The championship was disputed in three phases:

- Qualifying round: all twenty teams played each other in a single-round robin system, with the ten best teams advancing to the Blue Series and the ten worst going on to dispute the White Series.
- Blue Series: The ten teams played each other in a double round-robin system, and the team with the most points won the title.
- White Series: The ten teams played each other in a double round-robin system, and the team with the fewest points was relegated.

=== Qualifying phase ===
Pos	Team	Pld	W	D	L	GF	GA	GD	Pts	Qualification or relegation
1	Corinthians	19	13	6	0	46	18	+28	32	Blue Series
2	Santos	19	13	1	5	81	35	+46	27	Blue Series
3	Portuguesa	19	11	5	3	37	21	+16	27	Blue Series
4	São Paulo	19	10	5	4	46	19	+27	25	Blue Series
5	Jabaquara	19	11	3	5	35	33	+2	25	Blue Series
6	Palmeiras	19	9	5	5	38	23	+15	23	Blue Series
7	Ponte Preta	19	10	3	6	37	31	+6	23	Blue Series
8	XV de Piracicaba	19	11	0	8	45	39	+6	22	Blue Series
9	Portuguesa Santista	19	9	4	6	25	19	+6	22	Blue Series
10	Noroeste	19	8	5	6	42	33	+9	21	Playoffs
11	Botafogo	19	9	3	7	28	24	+4	21	Playoffs
12	São Bento (SCS)	19	8	2	9	25	33	−8	18	White Series
13	Juventus	19	8	1	10	31	39	−8	17	White Series
14	Ferroviária	19	7	3	9	28	37	−9	17	White Series
15	Taubaté	19	6	2	11	31	34	−3	14	White Series
16	Guarani	19	5	3	11	35	48	−13	13	White Series
17	XV de Jaú	19	4	4	11	24	46	−22	12	White Series
18	Nacional	19	4	3	12	27	45	−18	11	White Series
19	Ypiranga	19	3	2	14	18	50	−32	8	White Series
20	Linense	19	0	2	17	12	64	−52	2	White Series

Updated to match(es) played on September 29, 1957. Source: Futebolnacional.com
Rules for classification: 1) points; 2) goal difference; 3) wins; 4) number of goals scored.

==== Playoffs ====
Team 1	Score	Team 2
Botafogo	4–1	Noroeste

==== Top scorers ====
Rank	Player	Club	Goals
1	Pelé	Santos	19
2	Mazzola	Palmeiras	17
2	Aírton	Ponte Preta	17
4	Grilo	Portuguesa Santista	14
4	Pepe	Santos	14
4	Ney Blanco	São Paulo	14
7	Villalobos	Guarani	12
8	Tite	Santos	11
8	Guerra	XV de Piracicaba	11
10	Fifi	Guarani	10
10	Wilson Sorio	Jabaquara	10

=== Blue Series ===
Pos	Team	Pld	W	D	L	GF	GA	GD	Pts	Qualification or relegation
1	São Paulo	18	13	4	1	53	24	+29	30	Champions
2	Santos	18	13	3	2	63	30	+33	29	
3	Corinthians	18	12	4	2	44	21	+23	28	
4	Portuguesa	18	7	6	5	38	30	+8	20	
5	Botafogo	18	6	6	6	24	30	−6	18	
6	Portuguesa Santista	18	4	7	7	31	43	−12	15	
7	Ponte Preta	18	6	1	11	22	42	−20	13	
8	Jabaquara	18	2	6	10	19	34	−15	10	
9	Palmeiras	18	2	5	11	28	36	−8	9	
10	XV de Piracicaba	18	3	2	13	25	57	−32	8	

Updated to match(es) played on December 29, 1957. Source: RSSSF.com
Rules for classification: 1) points; 2) goal difference; 3) wins; 4) number of goals scored.

==== Top scorers ====
Rank	Player	Club	Goals
1	Pelé	Santos	17
2	Zague	Corinthians	15
3	Gino	São Paulo	13
3	Alfeu	Portuguesa	13
5	Tite	Santos	11
5	Pagão	Santos	11
5	Índio	Corinthians	11
8	Nilo	Palmeiras	9
8	Amaury	São Paulo	9
8	Maurinho	São Paulo	9

=== White Series ===
Pos	Team	Pld	W	D	L	GF	GA	GD	Pts	Qualification or relegation
1	Taubaté	18	11	2	5	39	25	+14	24	
2	Noroeste	18	10	3	5	35	23	+12	23	
3	Nacional	18	10	3	5	35	33	+2	23	
4	Guarani	18	9	2	7	56	33	+23	20	
5	São Bento (SCS)	18	6	8	4	24	26	−2	20	
6	Juventus	18	7	4	7	34	29	+5	18	
7	Ferroviária	18	7	3	8	32	38	−6	17	
8	XV de Jaú	18	5	2	11	31	43	−12	12	
9	Ypiranga	18	4	4	10	19	32	−13	12	
10	Linense	18	3	5	10	17	43	−26	11	Relegated

Updated to match(es) played on January 28, 1958. Source: RSSSF.com
Rules for classification: 1) points; 2) goal difference; 3) wins; 4) number of goals scored.

=== Final standings ===
Pos	Team	Pld	W	D	L	GF	GA	GD	Pts	Qualification or relegation
1	Corinthians	37	25	10	2	90	39	+51	60	
2	Santos	37	26	4	7	144	65	+79	56	
3	São Paulo	37	23	9	5	99	43	+56	55	Champions
4	Portuguesa	37	18	11	8	75	51	+24	47	
5	Botafogo	37	15	9	13	52	54	−2	39	
6	Portuguesa Santista	37	13	11	13	56	62	−6	37	
7	Ponte Preta	37	16	4	17	59	73	−14	36	
8	Jabaquara	37	13	9	15	54	67	−13	35	
9	Palmeiras	37	11	10	16	66	59	+7	32	
10	XV de Piracicaba	37	14	2	21	70	96	−26	30	
11	Noroeste	37	18	8	11	77	56	+21	44	
12	Taubaté	37	17	4	16	70	59	+11	38	
13	São Bento (SCS)	37	14	10	13	49	56	−7	38	
14	Juventus	37	15	5	17	65	68	−3	35	
15	Ferroviária	37	14	6	17	60	75	−15	34	
16	Nacional	37	14	6	17	62	78	−16	34	
17	Guarani	37	14	5	18	91	81	+10	33	
18	XV de Jaú	37	9	6	22	55	89	−34	24	
19	Ypiranga	37	7	6	24	37	82	−45	20	
20	Linense	37	3	7	27	29	107	−78	13	Relegated

Updated to match(es) played on January 28, 1958. Source: RSSSF.com
Rules for classification: 1) points; 2) goal difference; 3) wins; 4) number of goals scored.
