= 1962 in Brazilian football =

Football in Brazil
- Season: 1962

The following article presents a summary of the 1962 football (soccer) season in Brazil, which was the 61st season of competitive football in the country.

== Taça Brasil ==
Semifinals

Team #1	Agg	Team #2	1st leg	2nd leg	3rd leg
Botafogo	6-4	Internacional	2-2	2-2	2-0
Sport	1-5	Santos	1-1	0-4	-

Final

March 19, 1963

Santos	4–3	Botafogo

March 31, 1963

Botafogo	3–1	Santos

April 2, 1963

Botafogo	0–5	Santos

Santos declared as the Taça Brasil champions by aggregate score of 9–6.

== Torneio Rio-São Paulo ==
Final Stage

Position	Team	Points	Played	Won	Drawn	Lost	For	Against	Difference
1	Botafogo	6	3	3	0	0	6	2	4
2	São Paulo	3	3	1	1	1	5	5	0
3	Palmeiras	2	3	1	0	2	5	5	0
4	Flamengo	1	3	1	0	1	2	6	-4

Botafogo declared as the Torneio Rio-São Paulo champions.

== State championship champions ==
State	Champion	State	Champion
Acre	Atlético Acreano	Pará	Paysandu
Alagoas	Capelense	Paraíba	Campinense
Amapá	Santana	Paraná	Londrina
Amazonas	Rio Negro	Pernambuco	Sport Recife
Bahia	Bahia	Piauí	River
Ceará	Ceará	Rio de Janeiro	Fonseca
Distrito Federal	Defelê	Rio Grande do Norte	ABC
Espírito Santo	Rio Branco-ES	Rio Grande do Sul	Grêmio
Goiás	Vila Nova	Rondônia	Flamengo-RO
Guanabara	Botafogo	Roraima	-
Maranhão	Sampaio Corrêa	Santa Catarina	Metropol
Mato Grosso	Mixto	São Paulo	Santos
Mato Grosso do Sul	-	Sergipe	Confiança
Minas Gerais	Atlético Mineiro	Tocantins	-

== Other competition champions ==
Competition	Champion
Campeonato Brasileiro de Seleções Estaduais	Minas Gerais
Campeonato Sul-Brasileiro	Grêmio

== Brazilian clubs in international competitions ==
Team	Copa Libertadores 1962	Intercontinental Cup 1962
Santos	Champions	Champions

== Brazil national team ==
The following table lists all the games played by the Brazil national football team in official competitions and friendly matches during 1962.

Date	Opposition	Result	Score	Brazil scorers	Competition
April 21, 1962	Paraguay	W	6-0	Didi, Pelé, Coutinho, Vavá, Garrincha, Nílton Santos	Taça Oswaldo Cruz
April 24, 1962	Paraguay	W	4-0	Pelé (2), Pepe, Vavá	Taça Oswaldo Cruz
May 6, 1962	Portugal	W	2-1	Zagallo, Zequinha	International Friendly
May 9, 1962	Portugal	W	1-0	Pelé	International Friendly
May 12, 1962	Wales	W	3-1	Garrincha, Coutinho, Pelé	International Friendly
May 16, 1962	Wales	W	3-1	Vavá, Pelé (2)	International Friendly
May 30, 1962	Mexico	W	2-0	Zagallo, Pelé	World Cup
June 2, 1962	Czechoslovakia	D	0-0	-	World Cup
June 6, 1962	Spain	W	2-1	Amarildo (2)	World Cup
June 10, 1962	England	W	3-1	Garrincha (2), Vavá	World Cup
June 13, 1962	Chile	W	4-2	Garrincha (2), Vavá (2)	World Cup
June 17, 1962	Czechoslovakia	W	3-1	Amarildo, Zito, Vavá	World Cup
