= Urubatão =

Brazilian footballer and manager

Personal information
- Full name: Urubatão Calvo Nunes
- Date of birth: 31 March 1931
- Place of birth: Rio de Janeiro, Brazil
- Date of death: 24 September 2010 (aged 79)
- Place of death: Santos, Brazil
- Position: Defensive midfielder

Youth career
- 1947–1950: Bonsucesso

Senior career*
Years	Team	Apps	(Gls)
1951–1954	Bonsucesso		
1954–1961	Santos		
1961–1963	Club América		
1963	Jabaquara		
1964–1965	Ponte Preta		

International career
1957	Brazil	1	(0)

Managerial career
- 1974: Fortaleza
- 1975–1976: América-SP
- 1976: Fortaleza
- 1977: Santos
- 1977–1978: Portuguesa
- 1979: Ferroviário
- 1979: Marília
- 1980: Londrina
- 1980: Sport Recife
- 1981: América-SP
- 1981–1982: Londrina
- 1982: Operário-MS
- 1983–1984: Colorado
- 1984: Goiás
- 1985: América-SP
- 1986: Coritiba
- 1986: Novorizontino
- 1986: América-SP
- 1987: Noroeste
- 1987: Novorizontino
- 1988: Rio Branco de Andradas
- 1988: Noroeste
- 1988: União São João
- 1988: Catanduvense
- 1989: Londrina
- 1989: XV de Piracicaba
- 1990: Araçatuba
- 1990: Sãocarlense
- 1993: Matsubara
- 1995–1996: Ituano
- 1996: Araçatuba
- 1996: Nacional-SP
- 1996: Londrina
- 1997: Uberlândia
- * Club domestic league appearances and goals

Urubatão Calvo Nunes (31 March 1931 – 24 September 2010), simply known as Urubatão, was a Brazilian footballer and manager. Mainly a defensive midfielder, he could also play as a central defender.

Urubatão had his playing career mainly associated with Santos. As a manager, he worked mostly in the São Paulo state, notably managing América-SP four times.

== Playing career ==
=== Club ===
Born in Rio de Janeiro, Urubatão joined the youth setup of Bonsucesso in 1947. He signed his first professional contract in 1950, and moved to Santos in 1954.

Urubatão moved abroad in 1961, signing for Club América. He returned to his home country, and represented Jabaquara and Ponte Preta before retiring in 1965, aged 34.

=== International ===
Urubatão played one match for the Brazil national football team, a 1–2 Roca Cup loss against Argentina at the Maracanã Stadium on 7 July 1957.

== Managerial career ==
After retiring Urubatão became a manager, with his first Série A side being Fortaleza in 1974 and 1976. He returned to Santos in 1977, coaching the club in 26 matches.

Urubatão was subsequently in charge of a number of clubs, notably managing América-SP on five occasions, Portuguesa, Sport Recife, Londrina (where he won the 1981 Campeonato Paranaense), Goiás and Coritiba, but mainly worked in the São Paulo state.

== Death ==
Urubatão died on 24 September 2010, aged 77, due to a brain tumor.

== Career statistics ==
=== International ===
Brazil
Year	Apps	Goals
1957	1	0
Total	1	0

== Honours ==
=== Player ===
Santos

- Campeonato Paulista: 1955, 1956, 1958, 1960
- Torneio Rio – São Paulo: 1959

=== Manager ===
Londrina

- Campeonato Paranaense: 1981
