= Ney Blanco =

Brazilian footballer (1935–2005)

Personal information
- Full name: Ney Blanco de Oliveira
- Date of birth: 5 June 1935
- Place of birth: Santos, Brazil
- Date of death: 13 March 2005 (aged 69)
- Place of death: Guadalajara, Mexico
- Positions: Forward; attacking midfielder

Youth career
- –1949: Santos

Senior career*
Years	Team	Apps	(Gls)
1949–1950	Portuguesa Santista		
1950	Jabaquara	0	(0)
1951–1952	Fluminense		
1953	Santos	15	(1)
1954–1957	Palmeiras	150	(63)
1954	→ São Bento (loan)		
1957	→ Santos (loan)	1	(0)
1957–1958	São Paulo	29	(17)
1958	XV de Piracicaba		
1959	Ferroviária		
1960–1961	Santos		
1961–1962	América		
1962–1967	Atlas		
1967–1968	Toluca		
1969	Laguna		

Managerial career
- 1968–1969: Atlas
- * Club domestic league appearances and goals

Ney Blanco (5 June 1935 – 13 March 2005), was a Brazilian professional footballer who played as a forward and attacking midfielder.

== Career ==
Ney started in the Santos youth categories, but began his career as a professional at Portuguesa Santista, against Corinthians in 1949. He had a lightning spell at Jabaquara without playing, and at the request of coach Zezé Moreira, he was part of the champion squad of the 1951 Campeonato Carioca and the Copa Rio with Fluminense.

He returned to Santos, his formative club in 1953, but without playing many games. He was signed by SE Palmeiras and then loaned to São Bento de Sorocaba. At Palmeiras he was runner-up in the state in 1954, and after 150 appearances, he was loaned to Santos where he played just one game.

In São Paulo fc he was champion of São Paulo in 1957, later he played for XV de Piracicaba and Ferroviária de Araraquara. Returned to Santos in 1960 and was again state champion. In 1962 he moved to Mexican football where he played until 1968, when he retired. He was Mexican champion with Toluca in his last season as a player. The following year, he had a brief experience as a coach at Atlas FC. He also worked as a sports commentator.

== Honours ==
Fluminense

- Campeonato Carioca: 1951
- Copa Rio: 1952

São Paulo

- Campeonato Paulista: 1957

Santos

- Campeonato Paulista: 1960

Toluca

- Mexican Primera División: 1967–68
