= Agenor (footballer, born 1938) =

Brazilian footballer (1938–2018)

Personal information
- Full name: Agenor Eugênio Rodrigues
- Date of birth: 13 September 1938
- Place of birth: Itajaí, Brazil
- Date of death: 16 February 2018 (aged 79)
- Place of death: Balneário Camboriú, Brazil
- Position: Left winger

Youth career
- Tiradentes-SC

Senior career*
Years	Team	Apps	(Gls)
1955	Marcílio Dias		
1955–1959	Carlos Renaux		
1960–1965	São Paulo	119	(29)
1963	→ Prudentina (loan)		
1966	Nacional		
1967–1968	Jandaia-PR		
1968	Caldense		
- * Club domestic league appearances and goals

Agenor Eugênio Rodrigues (13 September 1938 – 16 February 2018), simply known as Agenor, was a Brazilian professional footballer who played as a winger.

== Career ==
Agenor began his career at the age of 17 at Marcílio Dias, but spent a short time at the club, being hired by Carlos Renaux. In 1960, he was offered to São Paulo, the club where he played most of his life. His greatest achievement at the club was a hat-trick against Boca Juniors on 25 January 1961, at La Bombonera.

== Death ==
Agenor died of heart problems in the city of Balneário Camboriú, aged 79.
