= Coutinho (footballer, born 1943) =

Brazilian footballer and manager (1943–2019)

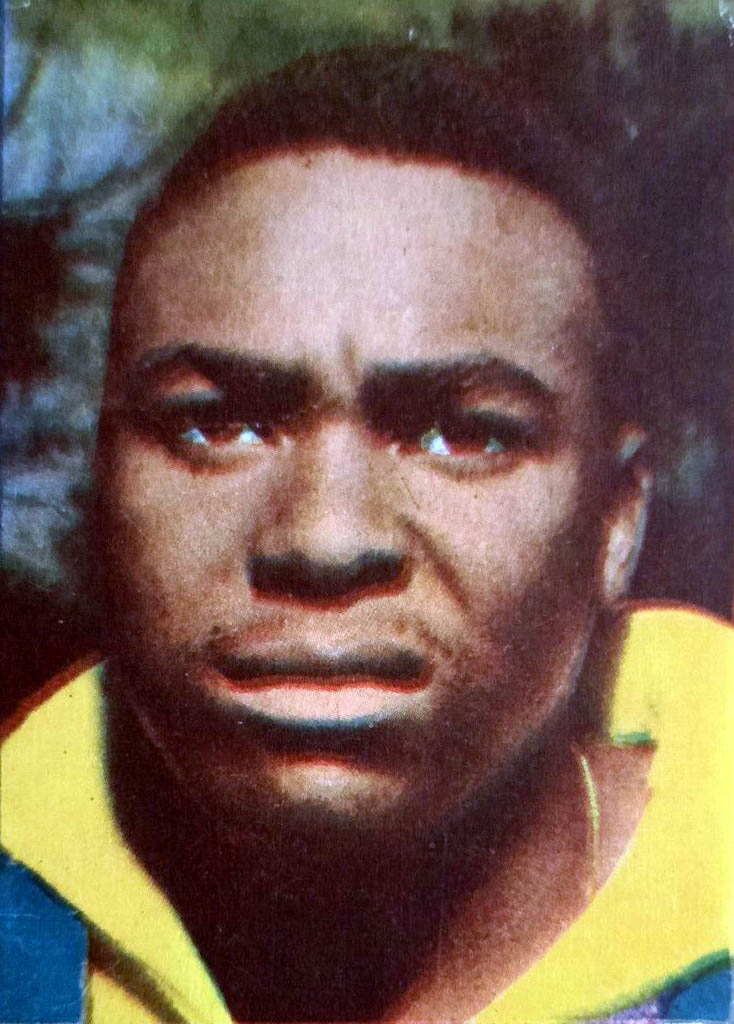
- Coutinho depicted on a football card in 1962

Personal information
- Full name: Antônio Wilson Vieira Honório
- Date of birth: 11 June 1943
- Place of birth: Piracicaba, São Paulo, Brazil
- Date of death: 11 March 2019 (aged 75)
- Place of death: Santos, São Paulo, Brazil
- Position: Striker

Youth career
- XV de Piracicaba
- 1957–1958: Santos

Senior career*
Years	Team	Apps	(Gls)
1958–1968	Santos	188	(171)
1968	Vitória	?	(1)
1969	Portuguesa	?	(1)
1970	Santos	?	(1)
1971	Atlas	25	(10)
1971–1972	Bangu	?	(3)
1973	Saad	?	(1)

International career
1960–1965	Brazil	15	(6)

Managerial career
- 1981: Santos
- 1985: Valeriodoce
- 1987: Comercial-SP
- 1987: Aquidauana
- 1988: Santo André
- 1992: Valeriodoce
- 1992: São Caetano
- 1993: Bonsucesso
- 1995: Santos
Medal record
Men's Football
Representing Brazil
FIFA World Cup
Winner	1962 Chile
- * Club domestic league appearances and goals

Antônio Wilson Vieira Honório (11 June 1943 – 11 March 2019), nicknamed Coutinho, was a Brazilian coach and footballer who played as a forward for Santos, where he was a teammate and one of the best partners of Pelé, and became a member of the Brazil national team that won the 1962 FIFA World Cup. He is considered one of the greatest strikers in the history of Brazilian football with 368 goals in 457 matches even though he prematurely ended his football career before the age of 30 due to knee problems. His main virtues as a striker were coldness and precision in finishing, the ability to dribble in tight spaces and a keen awareness of team play, which allowed him to make several one-two passes with Pelé in the midst of opponent defenses. In Brazil, during his time as a player, he received the nickname "genius of the small area" many years before other great Brazilian striker Romario. Pelé himself declares that "Coutinho, within the area, was better than me. His coldness was something supernatural".

== Early years ==
Born in Piracicaba, State of São Paulo in 1943 he was son of Antônia and Waldemar Honório. His start in football occurred in an unusual way, after fleeing his home in Piracibaba, in the countryside of São Paulo, to pursue his dream to become a professional football player. Coutinho was spotted at the age of 13 by Santos' coach Luís Alonso Pérez ("Lula") in a preliminary match of XV de Piracicaba against Santos in his hometown. After being praised by Santos FC players during that match he decided travel to Santos and try his chances in becoming a professional football player for Santos. He borrowed some money and a suitcase and left Piracicaba directly to Santos, 231 km from his hometown. The day after his arrival in Santos, his father arrived desperately in Santos from Piracicaba and went to pick him up to go home. His father (Mr Waldemar Honório) didn't want to hear about it and left with his son directly to the bus station. They embarked back home, but the Santos FC board of directors placed an emissary following the bus by car. And, at the first stop, they convinced Coutinho's father that football was a good investment in the future. And that was how Coutinho returned to Santos, starting his career in professional football. One year later he became part of the Santos' lower division. At the age of 13 years and 11 months, Coutinho debuted as a professional player, a record never broken for any other players.

== Club career ==
Coutinho debuted on Santos' professional team on May 17, 1958, still at the age of 14, in a match in Goiânia, against Sírio Libanês Futebol Clube. Coincidentally, the score was the same as the debut of his legendary partner Pelé, which had happened almost two years before: a 7–1 victory for Santos. And, like Pelé, Coutinho also scored one of Peixe's goals in his first match for the club's adult squad.

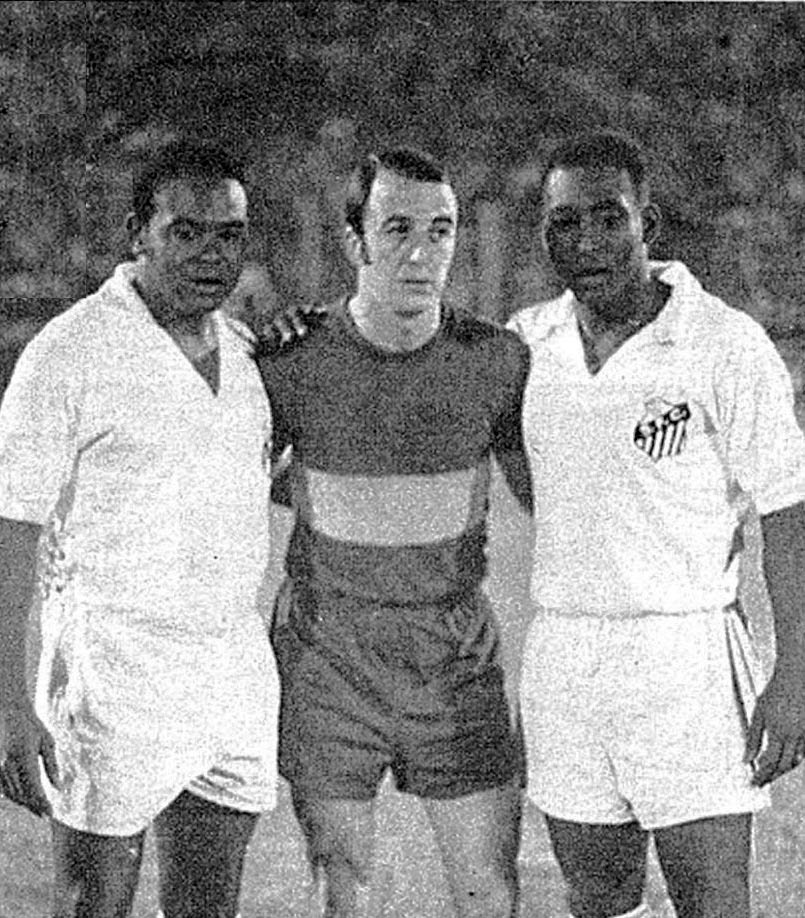
Coutinho (left) with Norberto Madurga and Pelé before a Boca Juniors v Santos match in Mar del Plata, 1970

In a game at the Olympic Stadium, journalists and people at the stadium reported seeing one of the most beautiful goals in the history of football. Pelé received the ball in the midfield on his head and quickly passed it to Coutinho, who also with his head, gave it back to Pelé. And after a few more head-only passes the attacking players approached the opponent's box, without the ball touching the pitch. In the final moment, with only the goalkeeper in front of him, Coutinho could have finished the amazing combination himself with a goal, but he saw Lima coming from behind and adjusted to pass, once again with his head, and allowed Lima to score. This goal left the opponents Grêmio fans standing up, applauding a majestic goal combination between two maestros of the ball.

Coutinho, in addition to resembling Pelé with his style of playing, also had physical characteristics similar to Pele. Therefore, a legend arose that the player started to wear a white ribbon on one of the arms, to help distinguish them. Regarding this urban legend, Coutinho said this: "For a short while, when I made a beautiful move, they said it was Pelé, when I missed a pass or a shot, it was Coutinho". In 2007, in an interview on the TV show "Juca Entrevista" (ESPN), with the journalist Juca Kfouri, he revealed why he used the prop: "I had a small wrist injury and started wearing a band for a while of adhesive tape. But as soon as the pains ended, I took it off."

From 1958 to 1970, he wore the shirt of Santos, winning 19 titles and scoring 368 goals in 457 matches. In this period, he won alongside Santos FC five Taça Brasil and seven Campeonato Paulista titles, two Copa Libertadores, and two Intercontinental Cups.

Coutinho has been named the greatest Santos' player after Pelé, with whom he formed an effective attacking duo with 1461 goals scored (370 by Coutinho). Coutinho also holds a mark of respect against one of Santos' main rivals, Corinthians. In 12 years of classics he played, he never lost a game. In the year that the taboo was broken, in 1968, Coutinho no longer worked for Santos.

After his tenure at Santos, he also played for Vitória of Bahia, Portuguesa of São Paulo, and Atlas of Mexico.

== International career ==
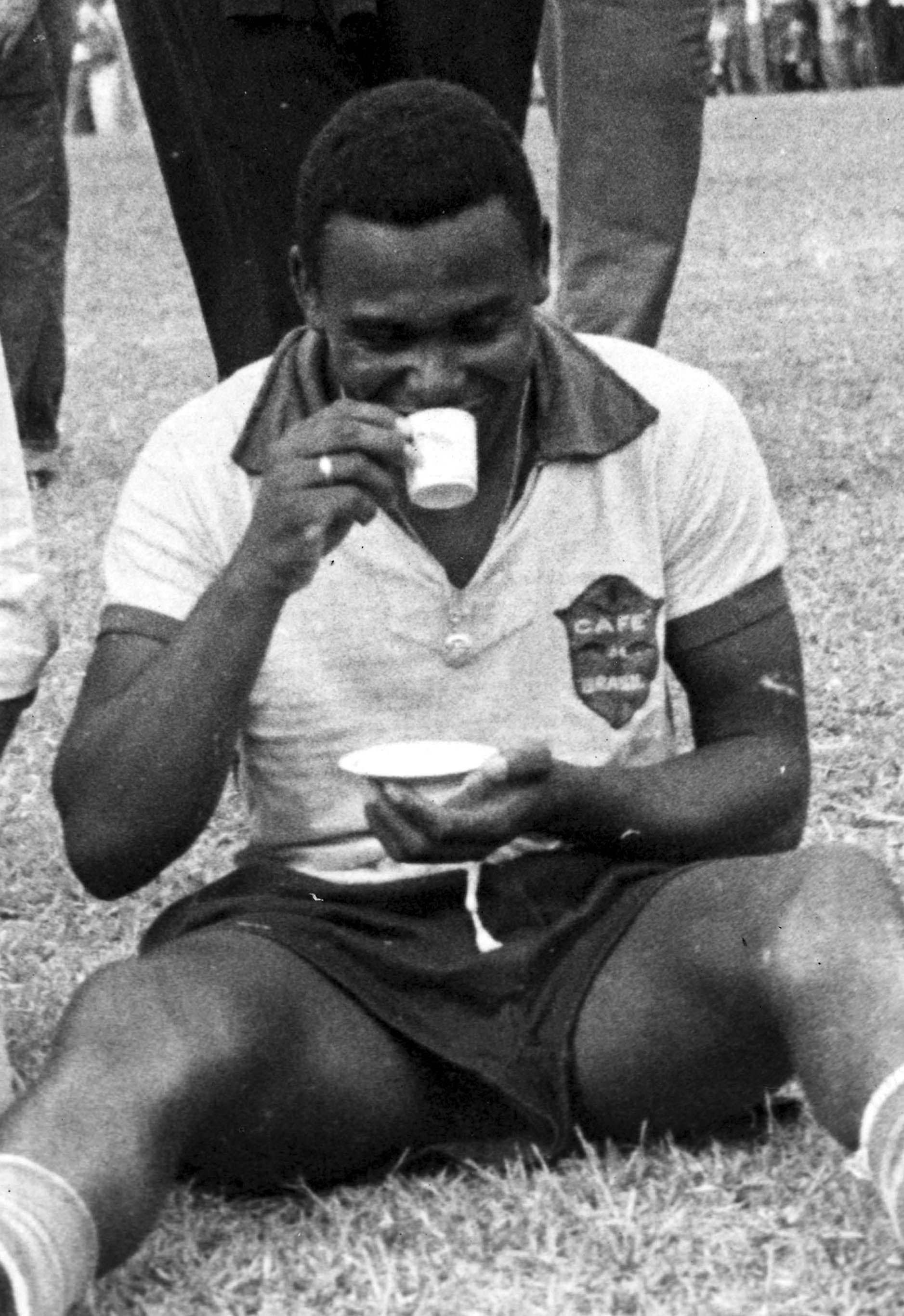
Coutinho with the Brazil national team while drinking a coffee on the pitch in 1962

Coutinho made his first match for the Brazil national team in Uruguay, against the home team. He was only just 17 years old and was the starter in that match valid for the Atlantic Cup.

At the international level, Coutinho earned 15 caps and scored 6 goals with the Brazil national football team between 1960 and 1965. He was meant to be a starter in the 1962 FIFA World Cup squad, but he was sidelined by injury just before the tournament and did not appear, even though he remained in the squad. Brazil went on to win the title.

In his book, Coutinho, o Gênio da Área, Carlos Fernando Schinner states that João Saldanha tried to convince Coutinho to return to Brazil national football team few months prior to the 1970 FIFA World Cup in order to replace Tostão who was Brazil's main centre-forward at that time and had suffered a major injury putting in doubt his participation on that World Cup. Coutinho, who at that time was semi-retired and overweight, refused the invitation.

== Death ==
Coutinho died on 11 March 2019 in Santos, São Paulo. His death was caused by a myocardial infarction due to diabetes and hypertension. Coutinho's health had been deteriorating in recent months, and in January he had been hospitalized for pneumonia.

== Career statistics ==
Club	Season	Campeonato Paulista		Torneio Rio – São Paulo		Campeonato Brasileiro Série A		International Competitions				Total	
Club	Season	Campeonato Paulista		Torneio Rio – São Paulo		Campeonato Brasileiro Série A		Copa Libertadores		Intercontinental Cup		Total	
Club	Season	Apps	Goals	Apps	Goals	Apps	Goals	Apps	Goals	Apps	Goals	Apps	Goals
Santos FC	1959	27	28	8	7	5	3					40	38
Santos FC	1960	12	10	8	1	-	-					20	11
Santos FC	1961	23	20	11	9	5	6					39	35
Santos FC	1962	21	32	-	-	5	7	6	6	2	2	34	47
Santos FC	1963	16	13	5	4	4	3	4	3	3	0	32	23
Santos FC	1964	13	11	9	9	4	3	0	0			26	23
Santos FC	1965	16	13	2	3	3	1	3	2			24	19
Santos FC	1966	8	9	2	0	0	0					10	9
Santos FC	1967	2	0			0	0					2	0
Santos FC	1968	-	-			0	0					-	-
Total		138	136	45	33	26	23	13	11	5	2	227	205

== Honours ==
=== Club ===
Santos FC

- Taça Brasil: 1961, 1962, 1963, 1964, 1965
- Copa Libertadores: 1962, 1963
- Intercontinental Cup: 1962, 1963
- Campeonato Paulista: 1960, 1961, 1962, 1964, 1965, 1967
- Torneio Rio–São Paulo: 1959, 1963, 1964, 1966
- Torneio de Paris: 1960, 1961
- Taça das Américas: 1963
- Torneio Pentagonal do México: 1959
- Taça Tereza Herrera (Espanha): 1959
- Torneio de Valência (Espanha): 1959
- Torneio Dr. Mario Echandi (Costa Rica): 1959
- Torneio Giallorosso (Itália): 1960
- Quadrangular de Lima (Peru): 1960
- Torneio Itália 1961 (Itália): 1961
- Torneio Internacional da Costa Rica (Costa Rica): 1961
- Pentagonal de Guadalajara (México): 1961
- Torneio Internacional da Venezuela (Venezuela): 1965
- Hexagonal do Chile (Chile): 1965
- Torneio de Nova York (Estados Unidos): 1966

=== International ===
Brazil

- FIFA World Cup: 1962
- Taça do Atlântico: 1960
- Copa Roca (Note: Not official competitions.): 1963
- Copa Bernardo O'Higgins: 1961
- Taça Oswaldo Cruz: 1961, 1962

=== Individual ===
- Copa Libertadores Top Scorer: 1962
- 1961 Taça Oswaldo Cruz (3 goals)
- 1961 Torneio Rio–São Paulo Top Scorer (9 goals)
- 1962 Campeonato Brasileiro Top Scorer (7 goals)
- 1964 Torneio Rio–São Paulo Top Scorer (11 goals)
