= Guillaume Raskin =

Belgian footballer (1937–2016)

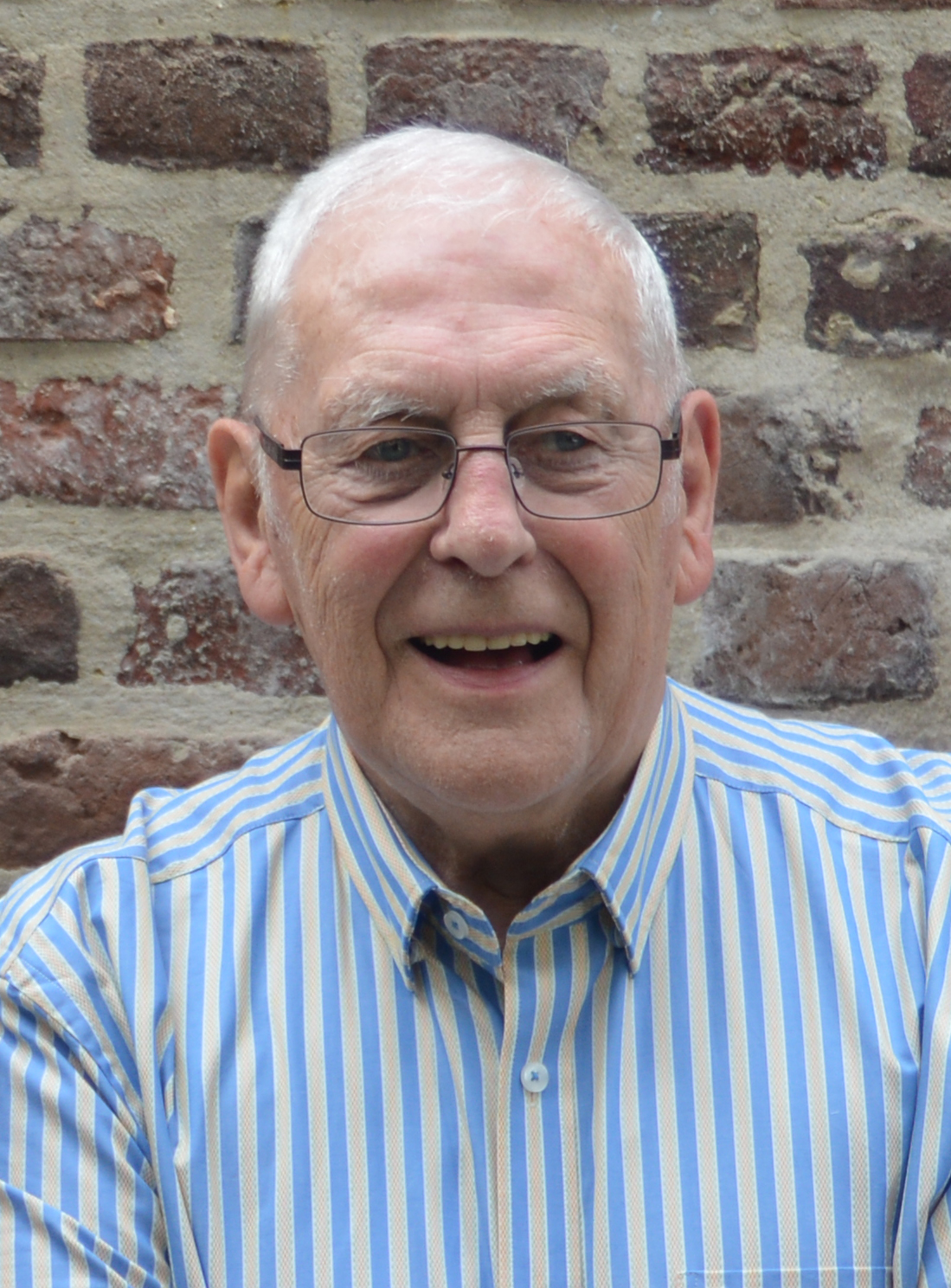

Personal information
- Date of birth: 16 March 1937
- Date of death: 16 November 2016 (aged 79)
- Position: Defender

Senior career*
Years	Team	Apps	(Gls)
- Standard Liège

International career
1960–1964	Belgium	20	(0)
- * Club domestic league appearances and goals

Guillaume Raskin (16 March 1937 – 16 November 2016) was a Belgian footballer who played as a defender. He made 20 appearances for the Belgium national team from 1960 to 1964.
