= Cido =

Brazilian footballer

Personal information
- Full name: Aparecido Martins Moreira
- Date of birth: 22 September 1939 (age 87)
- Place of birth: Águas de Santa Bárbara, Brazil
- Position: Forward

Youth career
- –1956: Palmeiras

Senior career*
Years	Team	Apps	(Gls)
1956–1958	Radium		
1959	Inter de Limeira		
1960	Rio Pardo		
1960–1961	Guarani		
1962–1964	São Paulo	73	(13)
1964	→ Bangu (loan)		
1965–1966	Nacional-SP		
- * Club domestic league appearances and goals as of 9 October 2023

Aparecido Martins Moreira (born 22 September 1939), better known as Cido, is a Brazilian former professional footballer who played as a forward.

== Career ==
Cido started his football career in Palmeiras youth team. With part of his family in the city of Mococa, he joined the second team at Radium FC, where he soon stood out. He also played for Inter de Limeira and Rio Parto until joining Guarani in 1960. He was signed by São Paulo FC alongside Benê. His greatest achievement for the club were the two goals against the Brazil in a friendly match in 1962, when the local team was testing players for the 1962 FIFA World Cup.

== Honours ==
São Paulo

- Small Club World Cup: 1963
