= Brandão (footballer, born 1941) =

Brazilian footballer

Personal information
- Full name: José Cândido de Campos
- Date of birth: 22 November 1941 (age 84)
- Place of birth: São Paulo, Brazil
- Position: Midfielder

International career
| Years | Team | Apps | (Gls) |
- Brazil Olympic

José Cândido de Campos (born 22 November 1941), known as Brandão, is a Brazilian footballer who played as a midfielder. He competed in the men's tournament at the 1960 Summer Olympics.
