= Ubaldo Miranda =

Brazilian footballer (born 1931)

Ubaldo
Personal information
- Full name: Ubaldo Miranda
- Date of birth: 19 July 1931 (age 95)
- Place of birth: Divinópolis, Brazil
- Position: Forward

Youth career
- Internacional (Divinópolis)

Senior career*
Years	Team	Apps	(Gls)
1950–1955	Atlético Mineiro		
1955–1958	Bangu		
1958–1960	Atlético Mineiro		
- * Club domestic league appearances and goals as of 30 May 2024

Ubaldo Miranda (born 19 July 1931) is a Brazilian former professional footballer who played as a forward.

== Career ==
A striker, Ubaldo played for Atlético Mineiro from 1950 to 1955, participating in winning five state titles. He didn't have a refined technique, but he scored a lot of goals, which earned him a move to Bangu AC. He returned in 1958, being carried by the fans, and becoming champion again. In total, he played 274 games for Atlético Mineiro and scored 135 goals.

In 2023, at the age of 92, Ubaldo held an event at Atlético Mineiro's official store, without being recognized by employees at first.

== Honours ==
Atlético Mineiro

- Campeonato Mineiro: 1950, 1952, 1953, 1954, 1955, 1958
