= 1963 Intercontinental Cup =

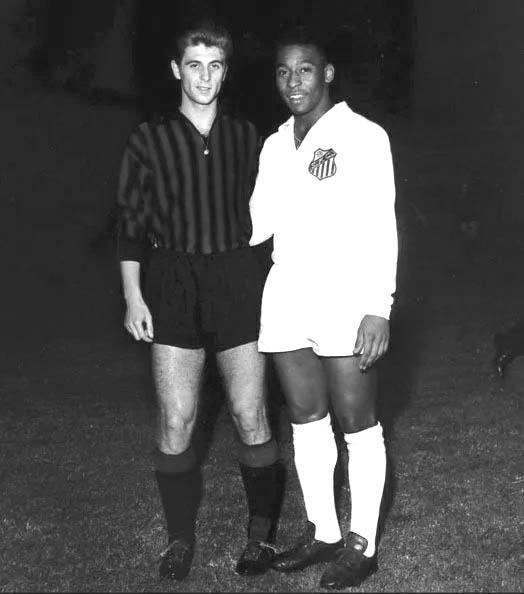
- Gianni Rivera and Pelé posing before the first leg in Milan
- Event: Intercontinental Cup
Milan	Santos
(Italy)	(Brazil)
- 2–2 on points Santos won after a play-off

First leg
Milan	Santos
4	2
- Date: 16 October 1963
- Venue: San Siro, Milan
- Referee: Alfred Haberfellner (Austria)
- Attendance: 51,917

Second leg
Santos	Milan
4	2
- Date: 14 November 1963
- Venue: Maracanã Stadium, Rio de Janeiro
- Referee: Juan Regis Brozzi (Argentina)
- Attendance: 132,728

Play-off
Santos	Milan
1	0
- Date: 16 November 1963
- Venue: Maracanã Stadium, Rio de Janeiro
- Referee: Juan Regis Brozzi (Argentina)
- Attendance: 120,421

The 1963 Intercontinental Cup was a two-legged football match contested between 1962–63 European Cup champions Milan and 1963 Copa Libertadores winners Santos. It was the fourth edition of the competition.

The first leg was played at the San Siro in Milan, on 16 October 1963. Milan won the home game 4–2. The return leg was held the following month, on 14 November, at the Maracanã in Rio de Janeiro. As Santos won the match 4–2, the two teams were level on points. Therefore, a playoff had to be contested two days later, and Santos won 1–0, thus assuring the trophy.

== Qualified teams ==
Team	Qualification	Previous finals app.
(Italy) Milan	1962–63 European Cup champion	None
(Brazil) Santos	1963 Copa Libertadores champion	**1962**

Bold indicates winning years

== Controversies ==
After Milan's 4–2 victory at the San Siro stadium, the return leg took place at the Maracanã in Rio de Janeiro. The match saw some controversies related to the refereeing by Juan Brozzi. Milan led 2–0 at half-time. However, the behaviour of the Santos players changed in the second half: they became aggressive towards their opponents, with the referee failing to punish their foul play. While the Italians complained not to manage to even cross the midfield line. Milan's Gianni Rivera commented afterwards, "Each time we touched the ball, the referee stopped us. Inconceivable. Unchained spectators, people on the pitch, everything happened".

The fouls from the Santos players were very hard, with goalkeeper Ghezzi and striker Rivera sustaining injuries. Santos scored four goals, three of which from free kicks, and won the game. There were later rumours that the referee had been bribed by the Santos management during the half-time break, others cite the relevance of the referee's profession: he was in fact, a travel agent, who was often in contact with Brazilian teams when they had to travel to Argentina for games.

As both teams had won a game each, a play-off game was necessary. The game took place two days later at the Maracanã again, as stated by the regulations, with Brozzi named as the referee again. Milan contested the latter decision, but the federation ignored the Italian's protests and confirmed Brozzi's appointment. The game began in the same manner as the previous one ended, with Santos pushing forward and attacking strongly. They also continued their physically aggressive play of the previous game, with their fouls again going largely unpunished. After half an hour, Brozzi awarded Santos a penalty for what a lot of reporters judged as being simulation by Dorval Rodrigues. Milan captain Cesare Maldini was sent off for his protests about the decision. The penalty kick was converted by Dalmo Gaspar to put Santos 1–0 up. Milan's subsequent attacks forward to the Santos box were fruitless, and Santos ran out winners in a controversial but undoubtedly legendary final. Afterwards, Juan Brozzi was kicked out by his same federation because of that events, and opened a luxurious flower and gardening shop in Buenos Aires.

== Match details ==
=== First leg ===
1963 Intercontinental Cup
16 October 1963
First leg

Milan (Italy)	4–2	(Brazil) Santos
Trapattoni 3'; Amarildo 15', 67'; Mora 82'	Report	Pelé 55', 84' (pen.)

San Siro, Milan
Attendance: 51,917
Referee: Alfred Haberfellner (Austria)

**Milan**	**Santos**

GK	1	(Italy) Giorgio Ghezzi
RB	2	(Italy) Mario David
CB	5	(Italy) Cesare Maldini (c)
LB	3	(Italy) Mario Trebbi
RH	4	(Italy) Giovanni Trapattoni
LH	6	(Italy) Ambrogio Pelagalli
IR	8	(Italy) Giovanni Lodetti
IL	10	(Italy) Gianni Rivera
RW	7	(Italy) Bruno Mora
ST	9	(Brazil) José Altafini
LF	11	(Brazil) Amarildo
Manager:
(Argentina) Luis Carniglia
Technical director:
(Italy) Giuseppe Viani

GK	1	(Brazil) Gilmar
RB	4	(Brazil) Lima
CB	2	(Brazil) Haroldo
CB	6	(Brazil) Calvet
LB	3	(Brazil) Geraldino
CM	8	(Brazil) Mengálvio
CM	5	(Brazil) Zito
RW	7	(Brazil) Dorval
ST	10	(Brazil) Pelé (c)
ST	9	(Brazil) Coutinho
LW	11	(Brazil) Pepe
Manager:
(Brazil) Lula

=== Second leg ===
14 November 1963
Second leg

Santos (Brazil)	4–2	(Italy) Milan
Pepe 50', 68'; Almir 54'; Lima 65'	Report	Altafini 12'; Mora 17'

Maracanã, Rio de Janeiro
Attendance: 132,728
Referee: Juan Regis Brozzi (Argentina)

**Santos**	**Milan**

GK	(Brazil) Gilmar (c)
DF	(Brazil) Ismael
DF	(Brazil) Mauro
DF	(Brazil) Haroldo
DF	(Brazil) Dalmo
MF	(Brazil) Lima
MF	(Brazil) Mengálvio
MF	(Brazil) Dorval
FW	(Brazil) Coutinho
FW	(Brazil) Almir
FW	(Brazil) Pepe
Manager:
(Brazil) Lula

GK	(Italy) Giorgio Ghezzi
DF	(Italy) Mario David
DF	(Italy) Mario Trebbi
DF	(Italy) Ambrogio Pelagalli
DF	(Italy) Cesare Maldini (c)
MF	(Italy) Giovanni Trapattoni
MF	(Italy) Giovanni Lodetti
MF	(Italy) Gianni Rivera
FW	(Italy) Bruno Mora
FW	(Brazil) José Altafini
FW	(Brazil) Amarildo
Manager:
(Argentina) Luis Carniglia
Technical director:
(Italy) Giuseppe Viani

=== Play-off ===
16 November 1963
Play-off

Santos (Brazil)	1–0	(Italy) Milan
Dalmo 31' (pen.)	Report

Maracanã, Rio de Janeiro
Attendance: 120,421
Referee: Juan Regis Brozzi (Argentina)

**Santos**	**Milan**

GK	(Brazil) Gilmar (c)
DF	(Brazil) Ismael	(red card) 44'
DF	(Brazil) Mauro
DF	(Brazil) Haroldo
DF	(Brazil) Dalmo
MF	(Brazil) Lima
MF	(Brazil) Mengálvio
MF	(Brazil) Dorval
FW	(Brazil) Coutinho
FW	(Brazil) Almir
FW	(Brazil) Pepe
Manager:
(Brazil) Lula

GK
DF
DF
DF
DF
MF
MF
MF
FW
FW
FW
Substitutes:
GK
Manager:
(Argentina) Luis Carniglia
Technical director:
(Italy) Giuseppe Viani

(Italy) Luigi Balzarini	(substituted off) 40'
(Peru) Víctor Benítez
(Italy) Mario Trebbi
(Italy) Ambrogio Pelagalli
(Italy) Cesare Maldini (c)	(red card) 34'
(Italy) Giovanni Trapattoni
(Italy) Giovanni Lodetti
(Italy) Giuliano Fortunato
(Italy) Bruno Mora
(Brazil) José Altafini
(Brazil) Amarildo
(Italy) Dario Barluzzi	(substituted on) 40'

== See also ==
- 1962–63 European Cup
- 1963 Copa Libertadores
- A.C. Milan in European football
- Santos FC in South America
