= Paulinho Ferreira =

Brazilian footballer

Personal information
- Full name: Paulo Ferreira de Camargo Filho
- Date of birth: 14 January 1940 (age 86)
- Position: Forward

Senior career*
Years	Team	Apps	(Gls)
- Palmeiras

International career
1960	Brazil Olympic		
- * Club domestic league appearances and goals

Paulo Ferreira de Camargo Filho (born 14 January 1940), known as Paulinho Ferreira, is a Brazilian former footballer who played as a forward. He played for the Brazil national team and was a member of the national squad at the 1960 Summer Olympics.
