= 1961 in Brazilian football =

Football in Brazil
- Season: 1961

The following article presents a summary of the 1961 football (soccer) season in Brazil, which was the 60th season of competitive football in the country.

== Taça Brasil ==
Semifinals

Team #1	Agg	Team #2	1st leg	2nd leg	3rd leg
America-RJ	4-12	Santos	2-6	1-0	1-6
Náutico	0-1	Bahia	0-0	0-1	-

Final

December 22, 1961

Bahia	1–1	Santos

December 27, 1961

Santos	5–1	Bahia

Santos declared as the Taça Brasil champions by aggregate score of 6-2.

== Torneio Rio-São Paulo ==
Final Stage

Position	Team	Points	Played	Won	Drawn	Lost	For	Against	Difference
1	Flamengo	6	3	3	0	0	10	2	6
2	Botafogo	5	3	2	1	0	3	1	2
3	Vasco da Gama	4	3	2	0	1	4	2	2
4	Palmeiras	3	3	1	1	1	2	3	-1
5	Santos	0	3	0	0	3	3	9	-6
6	Corinthians	0	3	0	0	3	0	5	-5

Flamengo declared as the Torneio Rio-São Paulo champions.

== State championship champions ==
State	Champion	State	Champion
Acre	Rio Branco-AC	Pará	Paysandu
Alagoas	CRB	Paraíba	Campinense
Amapá	Santana	Paraná	Comercial-PR
Amazonas	São Raimundo	Pernambuco	Sport Recife
Bahia	Bahia	Piauí	River
Ceará	Ceará	Rio de Janeiro	Rio Branco-RJ
Distrito Federal	Defelê	Rio Grande do Norte	ABC
Espírito Santo	Santo Antônio	Rio Grande do Sul	Internacional
Goiás	Vila Nova	Rondônia	Flamengo-PI
Guanabara	Botafogo	Roraima	-
Maranhão	Sampaio Corrêa	Santa Catarina	Metropol
Mato Grosso	Mixto	São Paulo	Santos
Mato Grosso do Sul	-	Sergipe	Sergipe
Minas Gerais	Cruzeiro	Tocantins	-

== Brazilian clubs in international competitions ==
Team	Copa Libertadores 1961
Palmeiras	Runner-up

== Brazil national team ==
The following table lists all the games played by the Brazil national football team in official competitions and friendly matches during 1961.

Date	Opposition	Result	Score	Brazil scorers	Competition
April 30, 1961	Paraguay	W	2-0	Coutinho, Pepe	Taça Oswaldo Cruz
May 3, 1961	Paraguay	W	3-2	Coutinho (2), Quarentinha	Taça Oswaldo Cruz
May 7, 1961	Chile	W	2-1	Garrincha, Didi	Bernardo O'Higgins Cup
May 11, 1961	Chile	W	1-0	Gérson	Bernardo O'Higgins Cup
June 29, 1961	Paraguay	W	3-2	Joel, Dida, Henrique Frade	International Friendly
