= Benê (footballer, born 1935) =

Brazilian footballer

Personal information
- Full name: Benedito Leopoldo da Silva
- Date of birth: 28 February 1935
- Place of birth: São Paulo, Brazil
- Date of death: 6 January 2001 (aged 65)
- Place of death: Campinas, Brazil
- Position: Midfielder

Youth career
- Paulista

Senior career*
Years	Team	Apps	(Gls)
1955–1960	Guarani		
1961–1968	São Paulo		
1968	Paulista		
1969	XV de Piracicaba		
1969–1970	São Paulo		

International career
1962	Brazil	1	(0)
- * Club domestic league appearances and goals as of 29 August 2023

Benedito Leopoldo da Silva (28 February 1935 – 6 January 2001), simply known as Benê, was a Brazilian professional footballer who played as midfielder.

== Career ==
Benê started his career at Guarani and defended São Paulo during 1960s, with 265 appearances and scoring 78 goals.

=== International career ===
Benê just entered the field for Brazil once time against Paraguay in the 1962 Taça Oswaldo Cruz.

== Death ==
Died 6 January 2001 in his farm, nearby Campinas.

== Honours ==
São Paulo

- Small Club World Cup: 1963
- Campeonato Paulista: 1970

Individual

- Prêmio Belfort Duarte: 1968
