= 1961 Campeonato Paulista =

Campeonato Paulista – Série A1
- Season: 1961
- Champions: Santos
- Relegated: Portuguesa Santista
- Taça Brasil: Santos
- Matches played: 240
- Goals scored: 878 (3.66 per match)
- Best Player: Pelé (Santos)
- Top goalscorer: Pelé (Santos) – 47 goals
- Biggest home win: Santos 10-1 Juventus (September 6, 1961)
- Biggest away win: Noroeste 1-7 Santos (August 13, 1961)
- Highest scoring: Santos 10-1 Juventus (September 6, 1961)

The 1961 Campeonato Paulista da Divisão Especial, organized by the Federação Paulista de Futebol, was the 60th season of São Paulo's top professional football league. Santos won the title for the 6th time. Portuguesa Santista was relegated. This year again, the top scorer was Santos's Pelé with 47 goals, achieving the distinction for the fifth year running.

== Championship ==
The championship was disputed in a double-round robin system, with the team with the most points winning the title and the team with the fewest points being relegated.

Pos	Team	Pld	W	D	L	GF	GA	GD	Pts	Qualification or relegation
1	Santos	30	25	3	2	113	33	+80	53	Champions
2	Palmeiras	30	22	6	2	82	29	+53	50	
3	São Paulo	30	18	5	7	73	40	+33	41	
4	Portuguesa	30	19	2	9	77	56	+21	40	
5	Ferroviária	30	15	8	7	65	45	+20	38	
6	Guarani	30	15	3	12	53	42	+11	33	
7	Corinthians	30	12	9	9	49	48	+1	33	
8	Botafogo	30	10	7	13	38	57	−19	27	
9	Comercial	30	10	6	14	38	45	−7	26	
10	Esportiva de Guaratinguetá	30	10	4	16	43	64	−21	24	
11	XV de Piracicaba	30	9	6	15	49	71	−22	24	
12	Juventus	30	10	1	19	35	74	−39	21	
13	Taubaté	30	7	6	17	39	62	−23	20	
14	Noroeste	30	6	7	17	50	74	−24	19	
15	Jabaquara	30	8	3	19	43	69	−26	19	
16	Portuguesa Santista	30	5	2	23	31	69	−38	12	Relegated

Updated to match(es) played on December 17, 1961. Source: RSSSF.com
Rules for classification: 1) points; 2) goal difference; 3) wins; 4) number of goals scored.

== Top Scores ==
Rank	Player	Club	Goals
1	Pelé	Santos	47
2	Peixinho	Ferroviaría	26
3	Pepe	Santos	24
4	Coutinho	Santos	20
5	Vavá	Palmeiras	19
6	Baiano	São Paulo	15
7	Toninho Guerreiro	Noroeste	14
8	Rafael	Corinthians	13
8	Oswaldo	Guaraní	13
10	Geraldo José	Palmeiras	12
10	Parada	Ferroviaría	12
10	Benê	São Paulo	12
