= 1962 Campeonato Brasileiro Série A =

Campeonato Brasileiro Série A
- Season: 1962
- Dates: 2 September 1962 – 2 April 1963
- Champions: Santos (2nd title)
- Copa Libertadores: Santos (title holder); Botafogo
- Matches: 39
- Goals: 128 (3.28 per match)
- Top goalscorer: Araponga - Campinense (8 goals)
- Biggest home win: Campinense 6-0 CRB

The 1962 Campeonato Brasileiro Série A (officially the 1962 Taça Brasil) was the 5th edition of the Campeonato Brasileiro Série A. It began on 2 September 1962, and ended on 2 April 1963.

== Format ==
The competition was a single elimination knockout tournament featuring two-legged ties, with a Tie-Break (play-off) if the sides were tied on points (however, if the tie-break was a draw, the aggregate score of the first two legs was used to determine the winner).

== Teams ==
Eighteen state champions qualified for the tournament.

Team	Home city	Home ground
(Rio Grande do Norte) ABC	Natal	
Bahia	Salvador	
(Guanabara (state)) ] Botafogo	Rio de Janeiro	
(Paraíba) Campinense	Campina Grande	
Ceará	Fortaleza	
(Paraná (state)) Comercial-PR	Cornélio Procópio	
(Alagoas) CRB	Maceió	
(Minas Gerais) Cruzeiro	Belo Horizonte	
(Rio Grande do Sul) Internacional	Porto Alegre	
(Santa Catarina (state)) Metropol	Criciúma	
(Pará) Paysandu	Belém	
(Rio de Janeiro (state)) Rio Branco-RJ	Campos dos Goytacazes	
(Piauí) River	Teresina	
(Maranhão) Sampaio Corrêa	São Luís	
(Espírito Santo) Santo Antônio	Vitória	
(São Paulo (state)) Santos	Santos	
Sergipe	Aracaju	
(Pernambuco) Sport Recife	Recife	

== Northern Zone ==
=== Northeastern Group ===
First Phase			Scores		
	Points		1st leg	2nd leg	Tie-break
Campinense	4 : 0	ABC	4 - 3	3 - 1	—
CRB	2 : 2	Sergipe	1 - 1	2 - 2	2 - 1

Semi-Final			Scores	
	Points		1st leg	2nd leg
Campinense	4 : 0	CRB	2 - 1	6 - 0

Final			Scores		
	Points		1st leg	2nd leg	Tie-break
Bahia	2 : 2	Campinense	1 - 0	0 - 2	1 - 1
Campinense progressed thanks to a better Goal Difference over the first 2 legs.

=== Northern Group ===
First Phase			Scores	
	Points		1st leg	2nd leg
River	1 : 3	Ceará	0 - 0	5 - 7
Paysandu	3 : 1	Sampaio Corrêa	3 - 2	2 - 2

Semi-Final			Scores		
	Points		1st leg	2nd leg	Tie-break
Paysandu	2 : 2	Ceará	0 - 0	1 - 1	1 - 3

Final			Scores	
	Points		1st leg	2nd leg
Sport Recife	3 : 1	Ceará	2 - 0	1 - 1

=== Northern Zone Final ===
			Scores	
	Points		1st leg	2nd leg
Campinense	1 : 3	Sport Recife	0 - 0	0 - 2

== Southern Zone ==
=== Southern Group ===
Semi-Final			Scores	
	Points		1st leg	2nd leg
Comercial-PR	1 : 3	Metropol	1 - 1	1 - 2

Final			Scores	
	Points		1st leg	2nd leg
Metropol	0 : 4	Internacional	2 - 3	2 - 3

=== Eastern Group ===
Semi-Final			Scores	
	Points		1st leg	2nd leg
Rio Branco-RJ	3 : 1	Santo Antônio	1 - 1	2 - 1

Final			Scores	
	Points		1st leg	2nd leg
Rio Branco-RJ	1 : 3	Cruzeiro	1 - 1	0 - 1

=== Southern Zone Final ===
			Scores	
	Points		1st leg	2nd leg
Cruzeiro	1 : 3	Internacional	1 - 1	1 - 2

== National Semi-Finals ==
Botafogo and Santos entered this stage.

			Scores		
	Points		1st leg	2nd leg	Tie-break
Botafogo	2 : 2	Internacional	2 - 2	2 - 2	2 - 0
Sport Recife	1 : 3	Santos	1 - 1	0 - 4	—

== National Final ==
			Scores		
	Points		1st leg	2nd leg	Tie-break
Santos	2 : 2	Botafogo	4 - 3	1 - 3	5 - 0
