= 1963 Copa Libertadores =

4th season of Copa Libertadores

1963 Copa de Campeones de América
Tournament details
- Dates: April 7 – September 11
- Teams: 9 (from 8 confederations)

Final positions
- Champions: (Brazil) Santos (2nd title)
- Runners-up: (Argentina) Boca Juniors

Tournament statistics
- Matches played: 19
- Goals scored: 63 (3.32 per match)
- Top scorer: (Argentina) José Sanfilippo (7 goals)

The 1963 Copa de Campeones de América was the fourth season of South America's premier club football tournament. Nine teams entered with Bolivia and Venezuela not sending a representative.

This competition was notable for the participation of many world class stars such as José Sanfilippo, Pelé, Garrincha, Antonio Rattín, Alberto Spencer and Jairzinho, among others. The Alvinegro da Vila, usually regarded as the greatest football club team ever, defeated their semifinal and final opponents in stylish fashion which included a 4–0 victory over Botafogo in the fabled Estádio do Maracanã, and a 2–1 win in La Bombonera, home of Boca Juniors. In a classic South American match-up, defending champions Santos defeated the Xeneixes on both legs of the final to retain the title.

== Qualified teams ==
Country	Team	Qualification method	App	Last	Previous Best
CONMEBOL; 1 berth	Santos	1962 Copa de Campeones winners	2nd	1962	champion
Argentina; 1 berth	Boca Juniors	1962 Primera División champion	first		
Brazil; 1 berth	Botafogo	1962 Taça Brasil runner-up	first		
Chile; 1 berth	Universidad de Chile	1962 Primera División champion	2nd	1960	preliminary round
Colombia; 1 berth	Millonarios	1962 Campeonato Profesional champion	3rd	1962	semifinals
Ecuador; 1 berth	Everest	1962 Campeonato Ecuatoriano de Fútbol champion	first		
Paraguay; 1 berth	Olimpia	1962 Primera División champion	3rd	1961	runner-up
Peru; 1 berth	Alianza Lima	1962 Primera División champion	first		
Uruguay; 1 berth	Peñarol	1962 Primera División champion	4th	1962	champion (2)

== Format and tie-breaking criteria ==
Due to the uneven number of teams, the first round became a group stage with two groups of three and one group of two. The format for the semifinals and the finals remained the same as the previous season.

At each stage of the tournament teams receive 2 points for a win, 1 point for a draw, and no points for a loss. If two or more teams are equal on points, the following criteria will be applied to determine the ranking in the group stage:

1. a one-game playoff;
2. superior goal difference;
3. draw of lots.

== First round ==
Eight teams were drawn into two groups of three and one group of two. In each group, teams played against each other home-and-away. The top team in each group advanced to the Semifinals. Santos, the title holders, had a bye to the next round.

=== Group 1 ===
Team	Pld	W	D	L	GF	GA	GD	Pts
(Brazil) Botafogo	4	4	0	0	5	1	+4	8
(Peru) Alianza Lima	4	1	1	2	2	3	−1	3
(Colombia) Millonarios	4	0	1	3	0	3	−3	1

April 24, 1963

Alianza Lima (Peru)	0–0	(Colombia) Millonarios

Lima

May 26, 1963

Millonarios (Colombia)	0–1	(Peru) Alianza Lima
		Zegarra

Bogotá

June 30, 1963

Alianza Lima (Peru)	0–1	(Brazil) Botafogo
		Élton

Lima

July 7, 1963

Millonarios (Colombia)	0–2	(Brazil) Botafogo
		Antoninho; Rildo

Bogotá

July 31, 1963

Botafogo (Brazil)	^{[A]}	(Colombia) Millonarios

Rio de Janeiro

July 24, 1963

Botafogo (Brazil)	2–1	(Peru) Alianza Lima
Jairzinho; Santos		Tenemás

Rio de Janeiro

=== Group 2 ===
Team	Pld	W	D	L	GF	GA	GD	Pts
(Uruguay) Peñarol	2	2	0	0	14	1	+13	4
(Ecuador) Everest	2	0	0	2	1	14	−13	0

June 9, 1963

Everest (Ecuador)	0–5	(Uruguay) Peñarol
		Sasía; Rocha

Guayaquil

July 7, 1963

Peñarol (Uruguay)	9–1	(Ecuador) Everest
Spencer; Matosas; Rocha; Abbadie		Gandó

Montevideo

=== Group 3 ===
Team	Pld	W	D	L	GF	GA	GD	Pts
(Argentina) Boca Juniors	4	3	0	1	9	6	+3	6
(Paraguay) Olimpia	4	2	0	2	7	10	−3	4
Universidad de Chile	4	1	0	3	7	7	0	2

April 7, 1963

Olimpia (Paraguay)	1–0	(Argentina) Boca Juniors
Ferreira

Asunción

April 14, 1963

Boca Juniors (Argentina)	5–3	(Paraguay) Olimpia
Valentim; Menéndez; Corbatta		Zárate; Segovia

Buenos Aires

June 26, 1963

Boca Juniors (Argentina)	1–0	Universidad de Chile
González

Buenos Aires

July 17, 1963

Universidad de Chile	4–1	(Paraguay) Olimpia
Alvarez; Marcos; Musso		Arámbulo

Santiago

July 24, 1963

Olimpia (Paraguay)	2–1	Universidad de Chile
Núñez		Sepúlveda

Asunción

July 31, 1963

Universidad de Chile	2–3	(Argentina) Boca Juniors
Campos		Sanfilippo

Santiago

== Knockout stage ==
=== Bracket ===
Semi-finals
Peñarol	1	0	1
Boca Juniors	2	1	3
Santos	1	4	5
Botafogo	1	0	1

Final
Boca Juniors	2	1	3
Santos	3	2	5

Four teams were drawn into two groups. In each group, teams played against each other home-and-away. The top team in each group advanced to the Finals.

=== Group A ===
Team	Pld	W	D	L	GF	GA	GD	Pts
(Argentina) Boca Juniors	2	2	0	0	3	1	+2	4
(Uruguay) Peñarol	2	0	0	2	1	3	−2	0

August 7, 1963

Peñarol (Uruguay)	1–2	(Argentina) Boca Juniors
Magdalena 80' (o.g.)		Valentim 26', 88'

Montevideo

August 17, 1963

Boca Juniors (Argentina)	1–0	(Uruguay) Peñarol
Sanfilippo 47'

Buenos Aires

=== Group B ===
Team	Pld	W	D	L	GF	GA	GD	Pts
(Brazil) Santos	2	1	1	0	5	1	+4	3
(Brazil) Botafogo	2	0	1	1	1	5	−4	1

August 22, 1963

Santos (Brazil)	1–1	(Brazil) Botafogo
Pelé 90'		Jairzinho 60'

São Paulo

August 28, 1963

Botafogo (Brazil)	0–4	(Brazil) Santos
		Pelé 11', 15', 33'; Lima 82'

Rio de Janeiro

== Finals ==
Team	Pld	W	D	L	GF	GA	GD	Pts
(Brazil) Santos	2	2	0	0	5	3	+2	4
(Argentina) Boca Juniors	2	0	0	2	3	5	−2	0

September 3, 1963

Santos (Brazil)	3–2	(Argentina) Boca Juniors
Coutinho 2', 21'; Lima 28'		Sanfilippo 43', 89'

Estádio do Maracanã, Rio de Janeiro
Attendance: 100,000
Referee: Marcel Albert Bois (France)

September 11, 1963

Boca Juniors (Argentina)	1–2	(Brazil) Santos
Sanfilippo 46'		Coutinho 50'; Pelé 82'

Estadio Camilo Cichero, Buenos Aires
Attendance: 50,000
Referee: Marcel Albert Bois (France)

== Champion ==
Copa Libertadores de América
1963 Champion

Santos
Second Title

== Top goalscorers ==
Pos	Player	Team	Goals
1	(Argentina) José Sanfilippo	(Argentina) Boca Juniors	7
2	(Brazil) Pelé	(Brazil) Santos	5
2	(Ecuador) Alberto Spencer	(Uruguay) Peñarol	5
4	(Brazil) Paulo Valentim	(Argentina) Boca Juniors	4
5	(Brazil) Coutinho	(Brazil) Santos	3
5	(Uruguay) José Francisco Sasía	(Uruguay) Peñarol	3

== Footnotes ==
A. Not played after Millonarios (already eliminated) preferred paying a fine of USD 4,500 rather than traveling to Rio for the match; points awarded to Botafogo but no goals.
