= 1961 Campeonato Brasileiro Série A =

Campeonato Brasileiro Série A
- Season: 1961
- Dates: 9 July – 27 December 1961
- Champions: Santos (1st title)
- Copa Libertadores: Santos
- Matches: 38
- Goals: 124 (3.26 per match)
- Top goalscorer: Pelé (7 goals)
- Biggest home win: Grêmio 6–1 Metropol; Santos 6–1 America-RJ

The 1961 Campeonato Brasileiro Série A (officially the 1961 Taça Brasil) was the 4th edition of the Campeonato Brasileiro Série A. It began on July 12, 1961, and ended on December 27, 1961. Santos were crowned champions after beating Bahia in the final, drawing 1–1 in the home leg before winning 5–1 in the away leg.

== Format ==
The competition was a single elimination knockout tournament featuring two-legged ties, with a tiebreak (play-off) if the sides were tied on points (however, if the tie-break was a draw, the aggregate score of the first two legs was used to determine the winner).

== Teams ==
Eighteen state champions qualified, along with the 1960 Campeonato Brasileiro Série A champions, Palmeiras.

Team	Home city
(Rio Grande do Norte) ABC	Natal
(Guanabara (state)) América-RJ	Rio de Janeiro
Bahia	Salvador
(Paraíba) Campinense	Campina Grande
(Paraná (state)) Coritiba	Curitiba
(Minas Gerais) Cruzeiro	Belo Horizonte
(Alagoas) CSA	Maceió
(Rio de Janeiro (state)) Fonseca	Niterói
(Ceará) Fortaleza	Fortaleza
(Rio Grande do Sul) Grêmio	Porto Alegre
(Santa Catarina (state)) Metropol	Criciúma
(Maranhão) Moto Club	São Luís
(Pernambuco) Náutico	Recife
(São Paulo (state)) Palmeiras	São Paulo
(Pará) Remo	Belém
(Sergipe) Santa Cruz-SE	Estância
(Espírito Santo) Santo Antônio	Vitória
(São Paulo (state)) Santos	Santos

== Northern Zone ==
=== Northeastern Group ===
Semi-Final			Scores	
	Points		1st leg	2nd leg
Santa Cruz-SE	0 : 4	Bahia	1 - 3	0 - 2
CSA	0 : 4	Campinense	2 - 3	1 - 2

Final			Scores	
	Points		1st leg	2nd leg
Campinense	0 : 4	Bahia	0 - 3	0 - 1

=== Northern Group ===
1st Round			Scores	
	Points		1st leg	2nd leg
Fortaleza	3 : 1	ABC	3 - 1	1 - 1
Remo	3 : 1	Moto Club	4 - 0	3 - 3

Final			Scores		
	Points		1st leg	2nd leg	Tie-break
Remo	2 : 2	Fortaleza	1 - 0	1 - 2	0 - 2

=== Northern Zone Final ===
			Scores	
	Points		1st leg	2nd leg
Bahia	4 : 0	Fortaleza	2 - 0	3 - 2

== Southern Zone ==
=== Southern Group ===
Semi-Finals			Scores		
	Points		1st leg	2nd leg	Tie-break
Palmeiras	2 : 2	Coritiba	2 - 0	1 - 3	4 - 1
Metropol	2 : 2	Grêmio	1 - 6	3 - 2	1 - 3

Final			Scores	
	Points		1st leg	2nd leg
Grêmio	1 : 3	Palmeiras	0 - 3	1 - 1

=== Eastern Group ===
Semi-Finals			Scores	
	Points		1st leg	2nd leg
Santo Antônio	0 : 4	Cruzeiro	1 - 2	1 - 3
Fonseca	1 : 3	América-RJ	0 - 0	0 - 3

Final			Scores	
	Points		1st leg	2nd leg
América-RJ	3 : 1	Cruzeiro	2 - 1	1 - 1

=== Southern Zone Final ===
			Scores	
	Points		1st leg	2nd leg
Palmeiras	1 : 3	América-RJ	1 - 1	1 - 2

== National Semi-Finals ==
Santos and Náutico entered at this stage.

			Scores		
	Points		1st leg	2nd leg	Tie-break
América-RJ	2 : 2	Santos	2 - 6	1 - 0	1 - 6
Náutico	1 : 3	Bahia	0 - 0	0 - 1	—

== National Final ==
			Scores	
	Points		1st leg	2nd leg
Bahia	1 : 3	Santos	1 - 5	1 - 1
