= 1965 Santos FC season =

Santos
1965 season
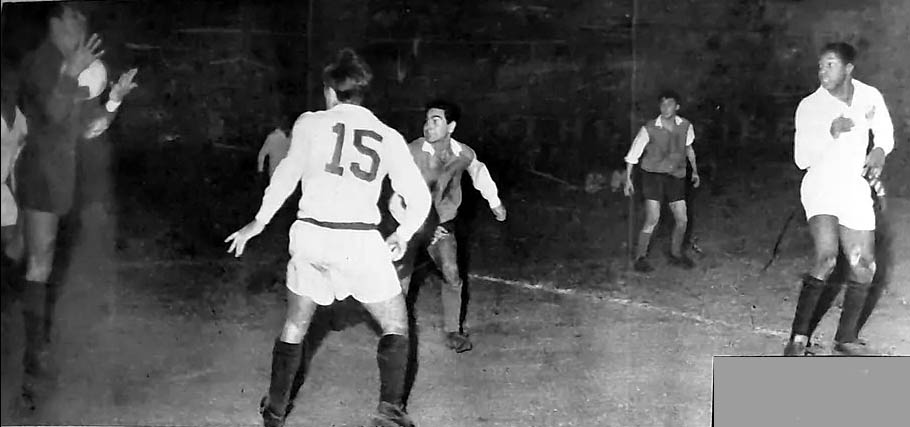
- Santos vs River Plate in August 1965
- President: Athiê Jorge Coury
- Head coach: Lula
- Stadium: Vila Belmiro
- Taça Brasil: Winners
- Campeonato Paulista: Winners
- Torneio Rio-São Paulo: 9th
- Copa Libertadores: Semifinals
- Top goalscorer: League: Toninho Guerreiro (5); All: Pelé (96)

The 1965 season was Santos Futebol Clube's fiftieth-third in existence and the club's fifth consecutive season in the top flight of Brazilian football. It was also the club's fourth consecutive participation in the Copa Libertadores.

Santos won two of the four official titles played in that season, lifting the Campeonato Paulista for the second consecutive year and the Taça Brasil for the fifth consecutive time. They also were knocked out in the semifinals of the Copa Libertadores by Peñarol, and finished ninth in the Torneio Rio-São Paulo.

Santos also played friendlies in all Americas, playing and lifting the trophy of the Torneo Internacional de Chile, the Torneo de Caracas and the Copa Amistad.

== Players ==
=== Squad ===
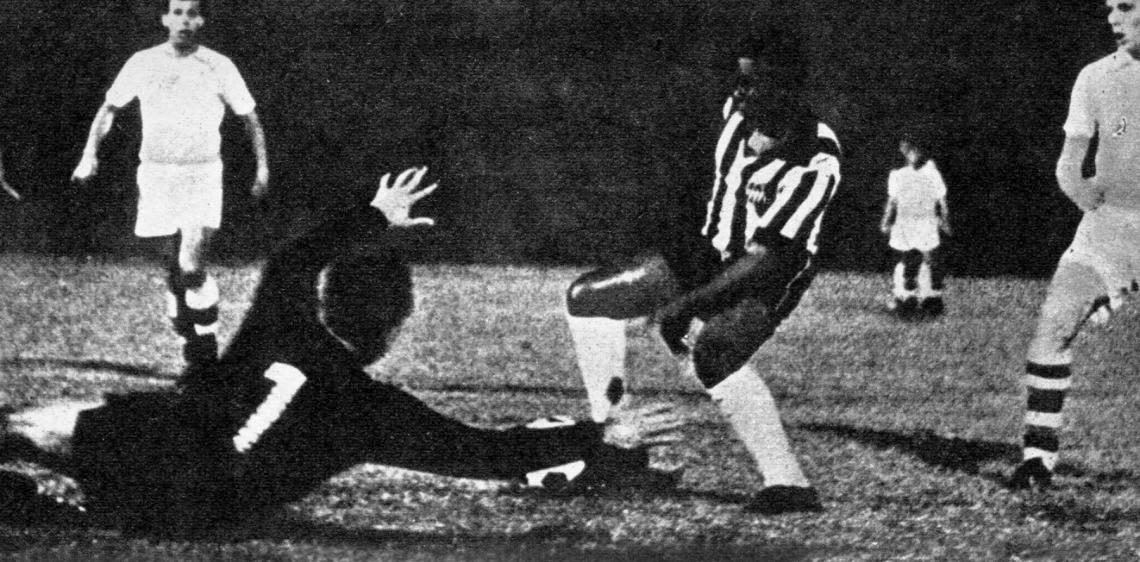
Coutinho (in black and white) at the Estadio Nacional in a friendly against the Czechoslovakia national team in January 1965

Note: Flags indicate national team as defined under FIFA eligibility rules; some limited exceptions apply. Players may hold more than one non-FIFA nationality.

No.	Pos.	Nation	Player
—	GK	BRA	Cláudio Mauriz
—	GK	BRA	Gilmar
—	GK	BRA	Laércio
—	GK	BRA	Silas
—	DF	BRA	Aparecido
—	DF	BRA	Carlos Alberto
—	DF	BRA	Dé
—	DF	BRA	Geraldino
—	DF	BRA	Haroldo
—	DF	BRA	Ismael
—	DF	BRA	Joel Camargo
—	DF	BRA	Mauro Ramos
—	DF	BRA	Modesto
—	DF	BRA	Oberdan
—	DF	BRA	Olavo
—	DF	BRA	Orlando Peçanha
—	DF	BRA	Pardal
—	DF	BRA	Quito
—	DF	BRA	Turcão
—	MF	BRA	Elizeu
—	MF	BRA	Gonçalo

No.	Pos.	Nation	Player
—	MF	BRA	Lima
—	MF	BRA	Mengálvio
—	MF	BRA	Salomão
—	MF	BRA	Santana
—	MF	BRA	Vadinho
—	MF	BRA	Zito
—	FW	BRA	Abel
—	FW	BRA	Ademir
—	FW	BRA	Almir Pernambuquinho
—	FW	BRA	Coutinho
—	FW	BRA	Del Vecchio
—	FW	BRA	Dorval
—	FW	BRA	Gilberto
—	FW	BRA	Gilson Porto
—	FW	BRA	Íris
—	FW	BRA	Noriva
—	FW	BRA	Peixinho
—	FW	BRA	Pelé
—	FW	BRA	Pepe
—	FW	BRA	Rossi
—	FW	BRA	Toninho Guerreiro

=== Statistics ===
==== Appearances and goals ====
Pos.	Nat	Name	Taça Brasil		Torneio Rio-São Paulo		Campeonato Paulista		Copa Libertadores		Friendlies		Total	
Pos.	Nat	Name	Apps	Goals	Apps	Goals	Apps	Goals	Apps	Goals	Apps	Goals	Apps	Goals
GK	(Brazil)	Cláudio Mauriz	0	0	4	0	0	0	0	0	8	0	12	0
GK	(Brazil)	Gilmar	4	0	0	0	30	0	5	0	15+1	0	55	0
GK	(Brazil)	Laércio	0	0	3	0	0	0	2	0	4+1	0	10	0
GK	(Brazil)	Silas	0	0	2	0	0	0	0	0	0	0	2	0
DF	(Brazil)	Aparecido	0	0	2	0	0	0	0	0	0	0	2	0
DF	(Brazil)	Carlos Alberto	4	0	0	0	30	0	0	0	16	1	50	1
DF	(Brazil)	Dé	0	0	2	0	0	0	0	0	1+4	0	7	0
DF	(Brazil)	Geraldino	4	0	5	0	25	0	7	0	24+1	1	66	1
DF	(Brazil)	Haroldo	0	0	5	0	0	0	3	0	14+2	0	24	0
DF	(Brazil)	Ismael	0	0	5	0	0	0	2	0	4+4	0	15	0
DF	(Brazil)	Joel Camargo	0	0	4	0	10	1	6	0	7+7	0	34	1
DF	(Brazil)	Mauro Ramos	4	0	0	0	30	0	2	0	18	0	54	0
DF	(Brazil)	Modesto	0	0	7	0	0	0	0	0	5+6	0	18	0
DF	(Brazil)	Oberdan	0	0	0	0	0	0	0	0	6	0	6	0
DF	(Brazil)	Olavo	0	0	2+1	0	0	0	4	0	2+2	0	11	0
DF	(Brazil)	Orlando Peçanha	4	0	0	0	29	0	0	0	5	0	38	0
DF	(Brazil)	Pardal	0	0	0+1	0	0	0	0	0	0	0	1	0
DF	(Brazil)	Quito	0	0	2	0	0	0	0	0	0	0	2	0
DF	(Brazil)	Turcão	0	0	0+1	0	0	0	0	0	0	0	1	0
MF	(Brazil)	Elizeu	0	0	5+1	0	0	0	0	0	0+2	0	8	0
MF	(Brazil)	Gonçalo	0	0	3	0	0	0	0	0	0	0	3	0
MF	(Brazil)	Lima	4	0	6	0	30	4	4	0	19+2	2	65	6
MF	(Brazil)	Mengálvio	4	0	3+1	0	12	1	7	1	17+4	1	48	3
MF	(Brazil)	Salomão	0	0	0	0	3	1	0	0	3+3	0	9	1
MF	(Brazil)	Santana	0	0	0+1	0	0	0	0	0	1+5	2	7	2
MF	(Brazil)	Vadinho	0	0	0+2	0	0	0	0	0	0	0	2	0
MF	(Brazil)	Zito	0	0	0	0	10	0	7	0	19	1	36	1
FW	(Brazil)	Abel	1+1	1	0	0	21	5	0	0	9+7	2	39	8
FW	(Brazil)	Ademir	0	0	0+1	0	0	0	0	0	0	0	1	0
FW	(Brazil)	Almir Pernambuquinho	0	0	2+1	0	0	0	0	0	0	0	3	0
FW	(Brazil)	Coutinho	3	1	2	3	17	13	3	2	20	18	45	37
FW	(Brazil)	Del Vecchio	0+1	0	0	0	0	0	0	0	0	0	1	0
FW	(Brazil)	Dorval	4	2	3	2	22	3	7	2	16+1	6	53	15
FW	(Brazil)	Gilberto	0	0	1+2	1	0	0	0	0	0+3	0	6	1
FW	(Brazil)	Gilson Porto	0	0	3	1	0	0	0	0	0	0	3	1
FW	(Brazil)	Íris	0	0	0+1	0	0	0	0	0	0	0	1	0
FW	(Brazil)	Noriva	0	0	5	1	0	0	0	0	0	0	5	1
FW	(Brazil)	Peixinho	0	0	6+2	3	7	1	1	2	11+13	9	40	15
FW	(Brazil)	Pelé	4	2	6	5	27	49	7	7	21	33	65	96
FW	(Brazil)	Pepe	3	0	1+1	0	9	2	7	3	16+9	3	46	8
FW	(Brazil)	Rossi	0	0	5+2	1	1	0	0	0	4+5	0	17	1
FW	(Brazil)	Toninho Guerreiro	1+1	5	5	3	17	11	3+1	0	13+14	17	55	36

Source: Match reports in Competitive matches

==== Goalscorers ====
Ran	Pos	Nat	Name	Taça Brasil	Rio-São Paulo	Paulistão	Libertadores	Friendlies	Total
1	FW	(Brazil)	Pelé	2	5	49	7	33	96
2	FW	(Brazil)	Coutinho	1	3	13	2	18	37
3	FW	(Brazil)	Toninho Guerreiro	5	3	11	0	17	36
4	FW	(Brazil)	Dorval	2	2	3	2	6	15
4	FW	(Brazil)	Peixinho	0	3	1	2	9	15
5	FW	(Brazil)	Abel	1	0	5	0	2	8
5	FW	(Brazil)	Pepe	0	0	2	3	3	8
6	MF	(Brazil)	Lima	0	0	4	0	2	6
7	MF	(Brazil)	Mengálvio	0	0	1	1	1	3
8	MF	(Brazil)	Santana	0	0	0	0	2	2
9	DF	(Brazil)	Carlos Alberto	0	0	0	0	1	1
9	DF	(Brazil)	Geraldino	0	0	0	0	1	1
9	DF	(Brazil)	Joel Camargo	0	0	1	0	0	1
9	MF	(Brazil)	Salomão	0	0	1	0	0	1
9	MF	(Brazil)	Zito	0	0	0	0	1	1
9	FW	(Brazil)	Gilberto	0	1	0	0	0	1
9	FW	(Brazil)	Gilson Porto	0	1	0	0	0	1
9	FW	(Brazil)	Noriva	0	1	0	0	0	1
9	FW	(Brazil)	Rossi	0	1	0	0	0	1
Own goals				0	0	2	1	0	3
Total				11	20	93	18	96	238

Source: Match reports in Competitive matches

== Competitions ==
=== Friendlies ===
==== Matches ====
- South American tour

13 January Torneo Internacional de Chile	Universidad Católica (Chile)	1–2	(Brazil) Santos	Santiago
	Ramírez 34'	Report	53' Pelé; 75' Toninho	Stadium: Estadio Nacional; Attendance: 68,608; Referee: Sergio Bustamante

16 January Torneo Internacional de Chile	Czechoslovakia national team	4–6	(Brazil) Santos	Santiago
	Masný 32'; Mráz 34'; Valošek 63'; Kadraba 82'	Report	27', 65' Coutinho; 45', 87', 90' Pelé; 50' Dorval	Stadium: Estadio Nacional; Attendance: 67,815; Referee: Rafael Hormozabal

22 January Torneo Internacional de Chile	River Plate (Argentina)	3–2	(Brazil) Santos	Santiago
	Lallana 62', 69'; Más 84'	Report	61' Pelé; 81' Toninho	Stadium: Estadio Nacional; Attendance: 60,426; Referee: Mario Vasquez

29 January Torneo Internacional de Chile	Colo-Colo (Chile)	2–3	(Brazil) Santos	Santiago
	Moreno 11'; Jiménez 33'	Report	28', 62' Dorval; 88' Toninho; (red card) Coutinho	Stadium: Estadio Nacional; Attendance: 69,204; Referee: Claudio Vicuña; Rafael Hormázabal
Note: Referee Vicuña refused to take part in the second half, allegedly "embarrassed" for not signalling two penalties for Santos in the first half

2 February Torneo Internacional de Chile	Universidad de Chile	0–3	(Brazil) Santos	Santiago
	Sánchez (red card)	Report	2' Dorval; 35' Pelé; 74' Zito; (red card) Lima	Stadium: Estadio Nacional; Attendance: 72,059; Referee: Mario Gasc

4 February	River Plate (Argentina)	0–1	(Brazil) Santos	Buenos Aires
		Report	63' Pepe	Stadium: Monumental; Attendance: 72,671; Referee: Miguel Comesaña

9 February	River Plate (Argentina)	3–4	(Brazil) Santos	Buenos Aires
	Lallana 20'; Delém 42', 72'	Report	6', 27' Pelé; 9' Pepe; 70' Toninho	Stadium: Monumental; Attendance: 72,671; Referee: Miguel Comesaña

21 February Torneo de Caracas	Deportivo Galicia (Venezuela)	1–3	(Brazil) Santos	Caracas
	Vicente 80'	Report	33', 52', 78' Pelé	Stadium: Estadio Olímpico; Attendance: 28,000~; Referee: Ángel Ortega

23 February Torneo de Caracas	Independiente (Argentina)	0–4	(Brazil) Santos	Caracas
		Report	50', 55' Toninho; 62', 80' Pelé	Stadium: Estadio Olímpico; Attendance: 40,000~; Referee: Heitor Ozorio

- Brazil-Paraguay tour

29 April	Remo (Brazil)	4–9	(Brazil) Santos	Belém
	Walter 17'; Zezé 24', 62', 76'	Report	8', 38', 40', 44', 55' Pelé; 27' Coutinho; 34' Carlos Alberto; 73' Toninho; 78' Peixinho	Stadium: Baenão; Referee: Manoel Joaquim Ramos

2 May	Bahia (Brazil)	1–6	(Brazil) Santos	Ilhéus
	Edinho	Report	, Peixinho, Coutinho; Pelé; Santana	Stadium: Mário Pessoa; Attendance: 10,000~; Referee: Edvaldo Martins

5 May	Bahia (Brazil)	1–3	(Brazil) Santos	Salvador
	Raimundo Mário	Report	, Toninho; Peixinho	Stadium: Fonte Nova; Attendance: 28,879; Referee: Walter Gonçalves

8 May	Dom Bosco (Brazil)	2–6	(Brazil) Santos	Cuiabá
	Uizer 86'; Pretinho 88'	Report	39', 47' Coutinho; 53', 55', 75' Pelé; 84' Peixinho	Stadium: Dutrinha; Referee: José Batista dos Santos

11 May	Comercial-MT (Brazil)	1–4	(Brazil) Santos	Campo Grande
	Nino 25'	Report	15' Coutinho; 32', 41', 48' Pelé	Stadium: Dilmar Fidalgo; Referee: José Batista dos Santos

14 May	Olimpia (Paraguay)	2–2	(Brazil) Santos	Asunción
	Rojas,	Report	Pelé; Coutinho	Stadium: Estadio Manuel Ferreira; Attendance: 30,000~; Referee: José Batista dos Santos

16 May	Grêmio Maringá (Brazil)	1–11	(Brazil) Santos	Maringá
	Edgar 39'	Report	22', 80' Peixinho; 24', 54' Pelé; 44' Lima; 49' Coutinho; 73', 81', 88', 90' Toninho; 89' Abel	Stadium: Willie Davids; Referee: José Batista dos Santos

3 June	Santos (Brazil)	4–1	(Brazil) Vasco da Gama	Santos
	Coutinho 40', 81'; Peixinho 89'; Mengálvio 90+2'		33' Mário	Stadium: Vila Belmiro; Attendance: 8,173; Referee: José Batista dos Santos

- Americas tour

11 June	Milan (Italy)	1–1	(Brazil) Santos	New York City
	Amarildo 15'	Report	28' Geraldino	Stadium: Downing Stadium; Attendance: 25,000~; Referee: William Petera

17 June	Universidad Nacional (Mexico)	1–2	(Brazil) Santos	Mexico City
	Muñoz	Report	Toninho; Pepe	Stadium: Olímpico Universitario; Attendance: 35,000~; Referee: Fernando Buergo

20 June	Aurora (Guatemala)	1–3	(Brazil) Santos	Guatemala City
	Vettorazzi 31'	Report	13' Toninho; 18' Santana; 84' Dorval	Stadium: Olímpico Mateo Flores; Attendance: 21,400~; Referee: Aurelio García

23 June	Liga Mayor XI (Venezuela)	0–1	(Brazil) Santos	Caracas
		Report	Abel	Stadium: Estadio Olímpico; Attendance: 13,000~; Referee: Sergio Bustamante

4 July Trofeo Ciudad de Caracas	Milan (Italy)	1–0	(Brazil) Santos	Caracas
	Gallardo 6'	Report		Stadium: Estadio Olímpico; Attendance: 32,000~; Referee: Ángel Ortega

25 July	CRB (Brazil)	0–6	(Brazil) Santos	Maceió
		Report	52', Pelé; 58', 63' Coutinho; Toninho; Peixinho	Stadium: Pajuçara; Attendance: 8,000~; Referee: Carmelito Voi

28 July	Santo Antônio (Brazil)	1–3	(Brazil) Santos	Vitória
20:30	Ciro 27'		5', 37' Coutinho; 73' Pelé	Stadium: Governador Bley; Referee: Carmelito Voi

- Copa Amistad

8 August	Boca Juniors (Argentina)	1–4	(Brazil) Santos	Buenos Aires
	Menéndez 72'	Report	10', 26' Pelé; 28' Lima; 89' Coutinho	Stadium: Monumental; Referee: Roberto Goicoechea

12 August	River Plate (Argentina)	1–2	(Brazil) Santos	Buenos Aires
	Sarnari 8'	Report	10' Coutinho; 22' Dorval; (red card) Zito	Stadium: Monumental; Referee: Ángel Coereza
Note: As Real Madrid refused to play against Santos, Santos was declared champions of the tournament

15 September	Minas Gerais state XI (Brazil)	2–1	(Brazil) Santos	Belo Horizonte
	Valtinho 6'; Dirceu Lopes 51'		26' Toninho	Stadium: Mineirão; Attendance: 87,701; Referee: Anacleto Pietrobom

=== Rio-São Paulo ===
==== First round ====
Group A

Pos	Team	Pld	W	D	L	GF	GA	GD	Pts	Qualification
1	(São Paulo (state)) Palmeiras	9	7	2	0	31	13	+18	16	Qualified to finals and second round
2	(São Paulo (state)) Portuguesa	9	3	3	3	9	13	−4	9	Qualified to second round
3	(São Paulo (state)) Corinthians	9	2	5	2	18	17	+1	9	Qualified to second round
4	(São Paulo (state)) São Paulo	9	3	2	4	15	13	+2	8	Qualified to second round
5	(São Paulo (state)) Santos (E)	9	3	2	4	20	24	−4	8	

Source: RSSSF
Rules for classification: 1) points; 2) wins; 3) goal difference; 4) goals for.
(E) Eliminated

===== Matches =====
10 March 1	Santos	4–1	Portuguesa	São Paulo
	Coutinho 1', 2', 61'; Peixinho 10'	Report	58' Ditão	Stadium: Pacaembu; Attendance: 18,700~; Referee: Anacleto Pietrobom

13 March 2	Santos	1–1	Flamengo	São Paulo
	Peixinho 31' (pen.)	Report	50' Fefeu	Stadium: Pacaembu; Attendance: 15,000~; Referee: Frederico Lopes

27 March 3	São Paulo	3–1	Santos	São Paulo
	Del Vecchio; Ladeira; Paraná	Report	Gilberto	Stadium: Pacaembu; Attendance: 11,077; Referee: Olten Aires de Abreu
Note: Santos played with a reserve team, as the starters were in Montevidéu to face Peñarol in the following day

31 March 4	Palmeiras	7–1	Santos	São Paulo
	Servílio, Tupãzinho; Ademar,, Rinaldo (pen.)	Report	Noriva	Stadium: Pacaembu; Attendance: 11,000~; Referee: Anacleto Pietrobom
Note: Santos played with a reserve team, as the starters were in Buenos Aires to face Peñarol in that day

4 April 5	Vasco da Gama	3–0	Santos	Rio de Janeiro
	Luizinho; Mário,	Report		Stadium: Maracanã; Attendance: 42,250; Referee: Airton Vieira de Moraes

11 April 6	Botafogo	3–2	Santos	Rio de Janeiro
	Bianchini, Jairzinho	Report	, Dorval	Stadium: Maracanã; Attendance: 37,490; Referee: Ethel Rodrigues

15 April 7	Santos	4–4	Corinthians	São Paulo
	Pelé 1', 10', 35', 58'	Report	15', 18' Flávio Minuano; 31' Marcos; 39' Geraldo José	Stadium: Pacaembu; Attendance: 50,782; Referee: Olten Aires de Abreu

18 April 8	Fluminense	2–5	Santos	Rio de Janeiro
	Gílson Nunes 14'; Luiz Henrique 33'	Report	39' Pelé; 44', 46' Toninho; 49' Peixinho; 70' Gilson Porto	Stadium: Maracanã; Attendance: 20,093; Referee: Albino Zanferrari

21 April 9	Santos	2–0	America-RJ	São Paulo
	Toninho 60'; Rossi 70'	Report		Stadium: Pacaembu; Attendance: 17,500~; Referee: Armando Marques

=== Copa Libertadores ===
==== First round ====
Group 2

Pos	Team	Pld	W	D	L	GF	GA	GD	Pts	Qualification or relegation
1	(Brazil) Santos	4	4	0	0	10	3	+7	8	Qualified to the Semifinals
2	Universidad de Chile	4	1	0	3	6	9	−3	2	
3	(Peru) Universitario	4	1	0	3	5	9	−4	2	

===== Matches =====
13 February 1	Universidad de Chile	1–5	(Brazil) Santos	Santiago
	Araya 84'	Report	12', 64', 77' Pelé; 28' Mengálvio; 60' Pepe	Stadium: Estadio Nacional; Attendance: 51,536; Referee: Romualdo Arppi Filho

19 February 2	Universitario (Peru)	1–2	(Brazil) Santos	Lima
	Calatayud 6'	Report	14', 39' Peixinho	Stadium: Estadio Nacional; Attendance: 50,000~; Referee: Rubén Cabrera

26 February 4	Santos (Brazil)	1–0	Universidad de Chile	São Paulo
	Pelé 51'	Report		Stadium: Pacaembu; Attendance: 27,834; Referee: Mario Gasc

6 March 5	Santos (Brazil)	2–1	(Peru) Universitario	São Paulo
	Pelé 22'; Pepe 76'	Report	77' Zavala	Stadium: Pacaembu; Attendance: 22,454; Referee: Esteban Marino

==== Semifinals ====
25 March First leg	Santos (Brazil)	5–4	(Uruguay) Peñarol	São Paulo
	Pelé 2'; Pepe 2'; Dorval 7', 22'; Coutinho 28'	Report	19' Pedro Rocha; 24', 80' Silva; 74' Sasía	Stadium: Pacaembu; Attendance: 30,518; Referee: Luis Ventre

28 March Second leg	Peñarol (Uruguay)	3–2	(Brazil) Santos	Montevideo
	Silva 8', 88'; Sasía 76'	Report	23' (o.g.) Ledesma; 58' Coutinho	Stadium: Centenario; Attendance: 72,000~; Referee: Luis Ventre
Note: Pelé scored the equalizer in the 91st minute, but the referee ruled out the goal alleging the match was already over

31 March Tiebreaker	Peñarol (Uruguay)	2–1 (a.e.t.)	(Brazil) Santos	Buenos Aires
	Joya 14'; Sasía 97'	Report	75' Pelé; (red card) 115' Mengálvio	Stadium: Monumental; Attendance: 50,133; Referee: Roberto Goycochea

=== Campeonato Paulista ===
Pos	Team	Pld	W	D	L	GF	GA	GD	Pts	Qualification or relegation
1	Santos	30	25	3	2	93	28	+65	53	Champions
2	Palmeiras	30	22	5	3	55	25	+30	49	
3	Corinthians	30	21	3	6	74	36	+38	45	
4	Portuguesa	30	13	9	8	43	34	+9	35	
5	São Paulo	30	13	7	10	52	32	+20	33	

Updated to match(es) played on December 16, 1965. Source: RSSSF.com
Rules for classification: 1) points; 2) goal difference; 3) wins; 4) number of goals scored.

==== Matches ====
11 July 1	Santos	3–1	América-RP	Santos
	Coutinho 3', 70'; Lima 8'	Report	66' Ladeira	Stadium: Vila Belmiro; Attendance: 13,861; Referee: Airton Vieira de Morais

14 July 2	Santos	6–2	Noroeste	Santos
	Pelé 4', 36', 61', 76', 81'; Salomão 40'	Report	15' Teixeira; 64' Lourival	Stadium: Vila Belmiro; Attendance: 10,588; Referee: Albino Zanferrari

18 July 3	Ferroviária	1–3	Santos	Araraquara
	Tales	Report	, Pelé (o.g.) Rossi	Stadium: Fonte Luminosa; Attendance: 6,800~; Referee: Etelvino Rodrigues

21 July 4	Santos	5–3	Comercial-RP	Santos
	Pelé,, Abel; Peixinho	Report	Luiz; Amaury; Paulo Bin	Stadium: Vila Belmiro; Attendance: 13,167; Referee: Albino Zanferrari

1 August 5	São Paulo	1–1	Santos	São Paulo
	Dias 66'	Report	28' Coutinho	Stadium: Morumbi; Attendance: 34,273; Referee: Olten Aires de Abreu

4 August 6	Santos	2–0	Portuguesa Santista	Santos
	Pelé; Coutinho	Report		Stadium: Vila Belmiro; Referee: Albino Zanferrari

15 August 7	Santos	3–1	Prudentina	Santos
	Pelé,, Zito (red card)	Report	Suingue	Stadium: Vila Belmiro; Attendance: 9,132; Referee: Airton Vieira de Morais

18 August 8	São Bento	0–3	Santos	Sorocaba
		Report	20' Coutinho; 36' Abel; 86' Toninho	Stadium: Carlos Joel Nelli; Referee: Olten Aires de Abreu

22 August 9	Santos	4–0	Portuguesa	Santos
	Pelé,, Coutinho	Report		Stadium: Vila Belmiro; Attendance: 16,481; Referee: José Teixeira de Carvalho

25 August 10	Santos	0–0	XV de Piracicaba	Santos
		Report		Stadium: Vila Belmiro; Attendance: 4,604; Referee: José Astolphi

29 August 11	Corinthians	3–4	Santos	São Paulo
	Flávio Minuano 2', 89'; Marcos 80'	Report	27', 39' (pen.) Pelé; 55' Dorval; 84' Abel	Stadium: Morumbi; Attendance: 59,044; Referee: José Teixeira de Carvalho

4 September 12	Botafogo	1–7	Santos	Ribeirão Preto
	Camilo	Report	,, Pelé, Coutinho; Abel; Lima	Stadium: Luís Pereira; Attendance: 15,416; Referee: Anacleto Pietrobom

8 September 13	Juventus	1–3	Santos	Ribeirão Preto
	Miranda 89'	Report	13', 58' Pelé; 87' Coutinho	Stadium: Luís Pereira; Attendance: 15,416; Referee: Anacleto Pietrobom

11 September 14	Santos	7–0	Guarani	Santos
	Pelé,,, Toninho, Lima	Report		Stadium: Vila Belmiro; Attendance: 10,117; Referee: Anacleto Pietrobom

19 September 15	Santos	0–1	Palmeiras	Santos
		Report	6' Ademar	Stadium: Vila Belmiro; Attendance: 25,664; Referee: José Teixeira de Carvalho

22 September 16	Santos	4–2	Ferroviária	Santos
	Toninho 17', 26'; Lima 64'; Pepe 79'	Report	55' Dejair; 77' Felício	Stadium: Vila Belmiro; Referee: Olten Aires de Abreu

3 October 17	Noroeste	0–3	Santos	Bauru
		Report	Joel Camargo; Pelé; Toninho	Stadium: Alfredo de Castilho; Attendance: 13,485; Referee: José Teixeira de Carvalho

7 October 18	Santos	4–2	São Bento	Santos
	Toninho, Pelé; Marinho Peres (o.g.)	Report	Almir; Copeu	Stadium: Vila Belmiro; Referee: Albino Zanferrari

10 October 19	Comercial-RP	0–2	Santos	Ribeirão Preto
		Report	42' (pen.) Pelé; 52' Dorval	Stadium: Palma Travassos; Attendance: 15,006; Referee: José Teixeira de Carvalho

13 October 20	Santos	3–0	Portuguesa Santista	Santos
	Pelé 39'; Pepe 69'; Dorval 75'	Report		Stadium: Vila Belmiro; Attendance: 6,695; Referee: Carlos Drumond da Costa

16 October 21	Santos	0–0	São Paulo	Santos
		Report		Stadium: Vila Belmiro; Attendance: 20,731; Referee: Carlos Drumond da Costa

24 October 22	América-RP	0–4	Santos	Ribeirão Preto
		Report	2', 13' (pen.), 64' (pen.) Pelé; 22' Abel	Stadium: Mário Alves Mendonça; Referee: Etelvino Rodrigues

27 October 23	Portuguesa	0–1	Santos	São Paulo
		Report	80' Toninho	Stadium: Pacaembu; Referee: Etelvino Rodrigues

31 October 24	Prudentina	2–5	Santos	Presidente Prudente
	Mazinho 19'; Lopes 88' (pen.)	Report	26', 61', 67', 75', 85' Pelé	Stadium: Félix Ribeiro Marcondes; Attendance: 16,602; Referee: Olten Aires de Abreu

7 November 25	XV de Piracicaba	0–2	Santos	Piracicaba
		Report	, Toninho	Stadium: Barão da Serra Negra; Referee: Olten Aires de Abreu

14 November 26	Santos	4–2	Corinthians	São Paulo
	Coutinho, Mengálvio; Pelé	Report	Flávio Minuano; Marcos	Stadium: Morumbi; Attendance: 55,028; Referee: Olten Aires de Abreu

25 November 27	Santos	5–0	Botafogo	Santos
	Pelé 5', 8' (pen.), 43', 85'; Coutinho 16'	Report		Stadium: Vila Belmiro; Referee: Anacleto Pietrobom

27 November 28	Santos	4–0	Juventus	Santos
	Pelé 6', 41', 63' (pen.); Coutinho 74'	Report		Stadium: Vila Belmiro; Attendance: 11,092; Referee: José Teixeira de Carvalho

4 December 29	Guarani	0–1	Santos	Campinas
		Report	Pelé	Stadium: Brinco de Ouro; Referee: Olten Aires de Abreu

12 December 30	Palmeiras	5–0	Santos	São Paulo
	Dário,, Servílio,	Report		Stadium: Parque Antárctica; Attendance: 26,589; Referee: Olten Aires de Abreu

=== Taça Brasil ===
==== Results summary ====
Overall								Home						Away					
Pld	W	D	L	GF	GA	GD	Pts	W	D	L	GF	GA	GD	W	D	L	GF	GA	GD
4	3	1	0	11	4	+7	7	2	0	0	9	3	+6	1	1	0	2	1	+1

==== Semifinals ====
3 November First leg	Santos	4–2	Palmeiras	São Paulo
	Toninho 14', 62', 81'; Abel 19'	Report	3' Ademar; 60' Rinaldo	Stadium: Pacaembu; Attendance: 29,385; Referee: Olten Ayres de Abreu

10 November Second leg	Palmeiras	1–1	Santos	São Paulo
	Ademar 66'	Report	6' Pelé	Stadium: Pacaembu; Attendance: 26,846; Referee: Airton Vieira de Morais

==== Finals ====
1 December First leg	Santos	5–1	Vasco da Gama	São Paulo
	Coutinho 5'; Dorval 62', 64'; Toninho 81', 86'	Report	82' (pen.) Célio	Stadium: Pacaembu; Attendance: 16,764; Referee: Romualdo Arpi Filho

8 December Second leg	Vasco da Gama	0–1	Santos	Rio de Janeiro
	Zezinho (red card) 80'; Ananias (red card) 80'; Luizinho (red card) 89'	Report	67', (red card) 80' Pelé; (red card) 80' Lima; (red card) 80' Geraldino; (red card) 89' Orlando	Stadium: Maracanã; Attendance: 38,788; Referee: Armando Marques
