= 1964 Santos FC season =

Santos
1964 season
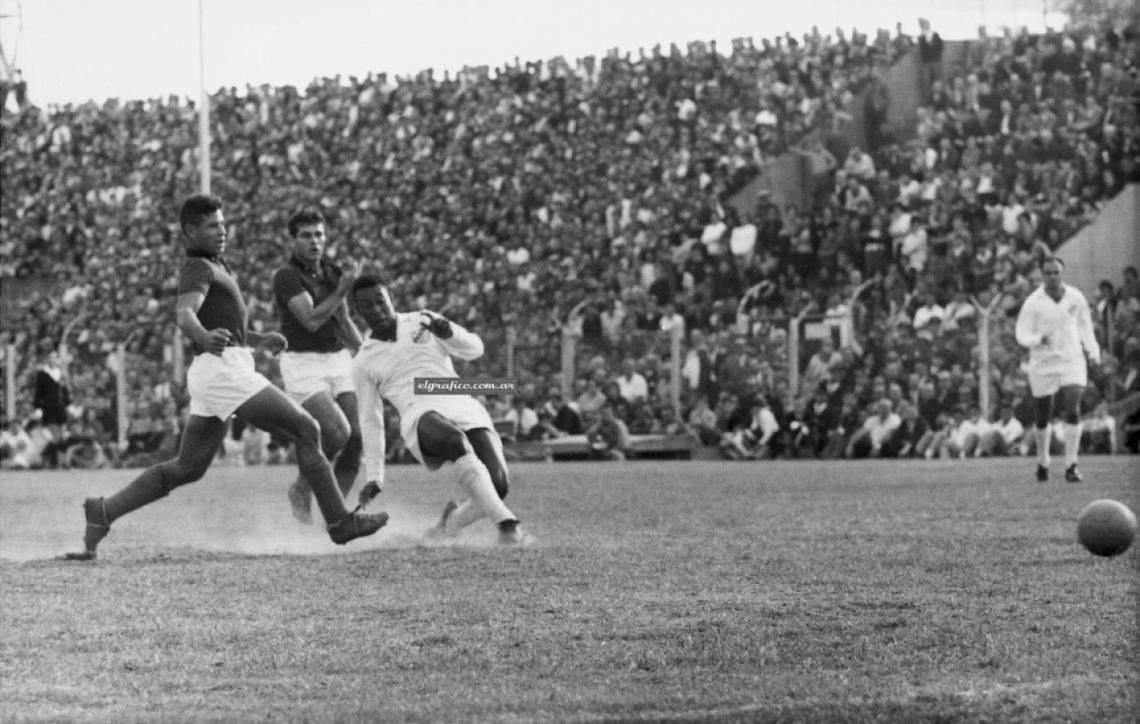
- Pelé (centre, in white) playing a friendly against Colón in May 1964
- President: Athiê Jorge Coury
- Head coach: Lula
- Stadium: Vila Belmiro
- Taça Brasil: Winners
- Campeonato Paulista: Winners
- Torneio Rio-São Paulo: Winners (shared with Botafogo)
- Copa Libertadores: Semifinals
- Top goalscorer: League: Pelé (7); All: Pelé (50)

The 1964 season was Santos Futebol Clube's fiftieth-second in existence and the club's fourth consecutive season in the top flight of Brazilian football. It was also the club's third consecutive participation in the Copa Libertadores.

Again led by Pelé, Santos won three of the four official titles played in that season, lifting the Torneio Rio-São Paulo, the Campeonato Paulista and the Taça Brasil. They also were knocked out in the semifinals of the Copa Libertadores by eventual champions Independiente.

Santos also played friendlies in South America and Europe, playing for the fourth time in the Tournoi de Paris. In that tournament, the club finished in the third place, shared with Reims.

== Players ==
=== Squad ===
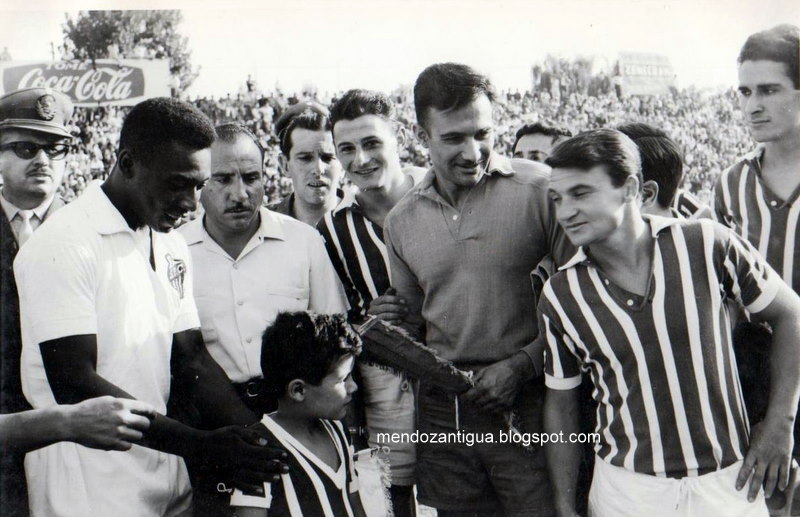
Pelé (left) at the Estadio Feliciano Gambarte in a friendly against Godoy Cruz in March 1964

Note: Flags indicate national team as defined under FIFA eligibility rules; some limited exceptions apply. Players may hold more than one non-FIFA nationality.

No.	Pos.	Nation	Player
—	GK	BRA	Gilmar
—	GK	BRA	Laércio
—	DF	BRA	Aparecido
—	DF	BRA	Calvet
—	DF	BRA	Dalmo
—	DF	BRA	Geraldino
—	DF	BRA	Haroldo
—	DF	BRA	Ismael
—	DF	BRA	Joel Camargo
—	DF	BRA	Mauro Ramos
—	DF	BRA	Modesto
—	DF	BRA	Olavo
—	DF	BRA	Turcão
—	MF	BRA	Elizeu
—	MF	BRA	Gonçalo
—	MF	BRA	Lima

No.	Pos.	Nation	Player
—	MF	BRA	Mengálvio
—	MF	BRA	Zito
—	FW	BRA	Ademir
—	FW	BRA	Almir Pernambuquinho
—	FW	BRA	Batista
—	FW	BRA	Chicão
—	FW	BRA	Coutinho
—	FW	BRA	Dorval
—	FW	BRA	Íris
—	FW	BRA	Noriva
—	FW	BRA	Peixinho
—	FW	BRA	Pelé
—	FW	BRA	Pepe
—	FW	BRA	Rossi
—	FW	BRA	Toninho Guerreiro

=== Statistics ===
==== Appearances and goals ====
Pos.	Nat	Name	Taça Brasil		Torneio Rio-São Paulo		Campeonato Paulista		Copa Libertadores		Friendlies		Total		1964 total	
Pos.	Nat	Name	Apps	Goals	Apps	Goals	Apps	Goals	Apps	Goals	Apps	Goals	Apps	Goals	Apps	Goals
GK	(Brazil)	Gilmar	4	0	10	0	28	0	2	0	17	0	61	0	64	0
GK	(Brazil)	Laércio	2	0	0	0	2	0	0	0	1+1	0	6	0	6	0
DF	(Brazil)	Aparecido	0+1	0	0+3	0	1	0	0	0	1+1	0	7	0	7	0
DF	(Brazil)	Calvet	0	0	0	0	0	0	0	0	1+1	0	2	0	2	0
DF	(Brazil)	Dalmo	0	0	0	0	6	0	1	0	0+1	0	8	0	10	0
DF	(Brazil)	Geraldino	5+1	0	4+1	0	15	0	1	0	14	0	41	0	44	0
DF	(Brazil)	Haroldo	2	0	1	0	19	0	2	0	7+2	0	33	0	36	0
DF	(Brazil)	Ismael	4	0	7	0	25	0	1	0	14+3	0	54	0	55	0
DF	(Brazil)	João Carlos	0	0	0	0	0	0	0	0	0	0	0	0	2	0
DF	(Brazil)	Joel Camargo	2	0	9	0	5	0	0	0	14+2	0	32	0	34	0
DF	(Brazil)	Mauro Ramos	4	0	0	0	8	0	0	0	6	0	18	0	20	0
DF	(Brazil)	Modesto	2	0	4	0	18	0	2	0	8	0	34	0	33	0
DF	(Brazil)	Olavo	0	0	6	0	3	0	0	0	0	0	9	0	9	0
DF	(Brazil)	Turcão	0	0	0	0	0	0	0	0	0+1	0	1	0	1	0
MF	(Brazil)	Elizeu	0	0	0+1	0	0	0	0	0	0	0	1	0	1	0
MF	(Brazil)	Gonçalo	0	0	4+1	0	3	0	0	0	1+2	0	11	0	11	0
MF	(Brazil)	Lima	5+1	0	9+1	0	29	0	2	0	13+5	0	65	0	68	0
MF	(Brazil)	Mengálvio	6	0	3	0	22	2	0	0	12+1	1	44	3	45	4
MF	(Brazil)	Zito	6	0	7	1	26	3	2	0	7	1	48	5	49	5
FW	(Brazil)	Ademir	0	0	0	0	0	0	0	0	0+1	0	1	0	1	0
FW	(Brazil)	Almir Pernambuquinho	0	0	6+1	0	5	0	2	0	10+5	3	29	3	29	3
FW	(Brazil)	Batista	0	0	0+2	0	0	0	0	0	1+3	1	6	1	8	1
FW	(Brazil)	Chicão	0	0	0	0	0	0	0	0	1+2	0	3	0	3	0
FW	(Brazil)	Coutinho	4	3	7+2	11	16	11	0	0	7	3	36	28	39	29
FW	(Brazil)	Dorval	0	0	0+1	0	0	0	0	0	4+5	0	10	0	13	0
FW	(Brazil)	Íris	0	0	0	0	1	0	0	0	0	0	1	0	1	0
FW	(Brazil)	Noriva	0	0	0+1	0	3	1	1	0	2+3	0	10	1	10	1
FW	(Brazil)	Peixinho	3	2	10	3	17	9	2	1	14+2	9	48	24	47	24
FW	(Brazil)	Pelé	6	7	5	3	21	34	0	0	12	6	44	50	47	58
FW	(Brazil)	Pepe	6	5	10	4	27	10	2	1	17	5	61	25	63	28
FW	(Brazil)	Rossi	0	0	4+2	0	5	1	1	0	7+3	1	22	2	22	2
FW	(Brazil)	Toninho Guerreiro	5	3	4+3	1	23	21	1	1	10+4	10	50	36	49	36

Source: Match reports in Competitive matches

==== Goalscorers ====
Ran	Pos	Nat	Name	Taça Brasil	Rio-São Paulo	Paulistão	Libertadores	Friendlies	Total
1	FW	(Brazil)	Pelé	7	3	34	0	6	50
2	FW	(Brazil)	Toninho Guerreiro	3	1	21	1	10	36
3	FW	(Brazil)	Coutinho	3	11	11	0	3	28
4	FW	(Brazil)	Pepe	5	4	10	1	5	25
5	FW	(Brazil)	Peixinho	2	3	9	1	9	24
6	MF	(Brazil)	Zito	0	1	3	0	1	5
7	MF	(Brazil)	Mengálvio	0	0	2	0	1	3
7	FW	(Brazil)	Almir Pernambuquinho	0	0	0	0	3	3
8	FW	(Brazil)	Rossi	0	0	1	0	1	2
9	FW	(Brazil)	Batista	0	0	0	0	1	1
9	FW	(Brazil)	Noriva	0	0	1	0	0	1
Own goals				0	0	3	0	0	3
Total				20	23	95	3	40	181

Source: Match reports in Competitive matches

== Competitions ==
=== Friendlies ===
==== Matches ====
- South American tour

1 February	Independiente (Argentina)	5–1	(Brazil) Santos	Avellaneda
	Bernao 5'; Savoy 18'; Suárez 44' 67'; Lima 60' (o.g.)	Report	57' Almir	Stadium: La Doble Visera; Referee: Luis Ventre

6 February	Peñarol (Uruguay)	5–0	(Brazil) Santos	Montevideo
	Alberto Spencer 12' 45'; Reznik 15'; Joya 23'; Pedro Rocha 65'	Report		Stadium: Centenario; Attendance: 38,875; Referee: Esteban Marino

8 February	Metropol (Brazil)	1–3	(Brazil) Santos	Criciúma
	Galego 13'	Report	15' Pepe; 25' Batista; 61' Almir	Stadium: Estádio Euvaldo Lodi; Referee: José Batista dos Santos
Note: Santos returned briefly from the South American tour to play this match, and resumed the tour later on

22 February	Sport Boys (Peru)	2–3	(Brazil) Santos	Lima
	Delgado 42'; Cavagnari 71'	Report	28', 75' Pelé; 89' Toninho; (red card) Ismael	Stadium: Estadio Nacional; Attendance: 31,964; Referee: Eugenio Cali

25 February	Alianza Lima (Peru)	2–3	(Brazil) Santos	Lima
	Zegarra 18', 42'	Report	50' Mengálvio; 51' Peixinho; 66' Toninho	Stadium: Estadio Nacional; Referee: Alberto Tejada

28 February	Colo-Colo (Chile)	3–2	(Brazil) Santos	Santiago
	Valdés, Verdejo	Report	Pepe; Toninho	Stadium: Estadio Nacional; Attendance: 66,839; Referee: Claudio Vicuña

1 March	Godoy Cruz (Argentina)	2–3	(Brazil) Santos	Godoy Cruz
	Curi 40'; Marchiori 70'	Report	20' Toninho; 60', 89' Peixinho	Stadium: Feliciano Gambarte; Referee: Pablo Paens

6 March	Colo-Colo (Chile)	2–4	(Brazil) Santos	Santiago
	Valdés 3'; Álvarez 16'	Report	11' Rossi; 32', 65', 74' Toninho	Stadium: Estadio Nacional; Attendance: 68,374; Referee: Jorge Trussão

8 March	Talleres (Argentina)	1–2	(Brazil) Santos	Córdoba
	Armerante 82'	Report	16' Toninho; 58' Pepe	Stadium: Estadio La Boutique; Referee: Febo Vieira Bueno

- Argentine tour

5 May	Boca Juniors (Argentina)	3–4	(Brazil) Santos	Buenos Aires
	Rodríguez 57'; Paulo Valentim 65', 80'	Report	13', 70' Peixinho; 20' Zito; 29' Pelé	Stadium: La Bombonera; Referee: Luis Ventre

7 May	Racing Club (Argentina)	1–2	(Brazil) Santos	Avellaneda
	Menotti 83'; Martín (red card)	Report	26' Coutinho; 90' Pelé; (red card) Almir	Stadium: La Doble Visera; Referee: Aurelio Bozalino

10 May	Colón (Argentina)	2–1	(Brazil) Santos	Santa Fe
	López 51'; Gómez 87'	Report	36' Pelé	Stadium: Brigadier General Estanislao López; Referee: Raul Comesaña

6 June	Santos (Brazil)	3–0	(Brazil) Portuguesa Santista	Santos
	Coutinho 21', 57'; Peixinho 73'			Stadium: Ulrico Mursa; Referee: Manoel Joaquim Ramos

- Tournoi de Paris

16 June Semifinal	Borussia Dortmund (Germany)	3–1	(Brazil) Santos	Paris
	Cyliax 29'; Emmerich 48', 62'	Report	5' Pepe	Stadium: Parc des Princes; Referee: Raul Comesaña

18 June Third place match	Reims (France)	1–1	(Brazil) Santos	Paris
	Goujon 28'	Report	14' Peixinho	Stadium: Parc des Princes; Attendance: 20,000~; Referee: Suszek

- European tour

21 June	Saint-Étienne (France)	3–4	(Brazil) Santos	Saint-Étienne
	Herbin 11'; Mitoraj 30'; Guy 84'	Report	5', 69' Toninho; 73' Peixinho; 79' Almir	Stadium: Stade Geoffroy-Guichard

24 June	Borussia Mönchengladbach (Germany)	1–2	(Brazil) Santos	Mönchengladbach
	Laumen 3'	Report	40' Pepe; 42' Peixinho	Stadium: Bökelbergstadion; Attendance: 20,000~; Referee: Sihoering

7 October	Colo-Colo (Chile)	3–1	(Brazil) Santos	Santiago
	Álvarez 7', 20'; Valdés 52'		5' Pelé	Stadium: Estadio Nacional; Attendance: 69,877; Referee: Sergio Bustamante

=== Rio-São Paulo ===
#	Team	Pld	W	D	L	GF	GA	GD	Pts
1	Santos (C)	9	7	0	2	21	9	12	14
2	Botafogo (C)	9	7	0	2	21	12	9	14
3	Palmeiras	9	4	2	3	19	15	4	10
4	Flamengo	9	3	4	2	12	11	1	10
5	Bangu	9	3	3	3	11	14	-3	9

==== Matches ====
18 March 1	Santos	3–0	Corinthians	São Paulo
	Peixinho 26', 66'; Pelé 64'	Report		Stadium: Pacaembu; Referee: Armando Marques

22 March 2	Fluminense	0–1	Santos	Rio de Janeiro
		Report	53' (pen.) Pepe	Stadium: Maracanã; Attendance: 39,575; Referee: Eunápio de Queiroz

29 March 3	Santos	2–0	Vasco da Gama	São Paulo
	Coutinho 46', 65'	Report		Stadium: Pacaembu; Referee: Aírton Vieira de Moraes

5 April 4	Santos	2–1	Bangu	São Paulo
	Coutinho 42', 52'	Report	60' (pen.), Parada	Stadium: Pacaembu; Referee: Cláudio Magalhães

11 April 5	Santos	2–1	Palmeiras	São Paulo
	Zito 15'; Peixinho 65'	Report	53' Julinho	Stadium: Pacaembu; Referee: Anacleto Pietrobom

15 April 6	Portuguesa	5–2	Santos	São Paulo
	Ivair,, Dida; Henrique	Report	Pepe; Coutinho	Stadium: Pacaembu; Referee: Armando Marques

19 April 7	Santos	4–1	São Paulo	São Paulo
	Coutinho 17', 53', 65'; Toninho 80'	Report	11' (pen.) Pagão	Stadium: Pacaembu

25 April 8	Botafogo	1–3	Santos	Rio de Janeiro
	Garrincha 82'	Report	43' Coutinho; 73' Pelé; 86' Pepe	Stadium: Maracanã; Attendance: 51,570; Referee: Eunápio de Queiroz

1 May 9	Flamengo	3–2	Santos	Rio de Janeiro
	Paulo Choco 36'; Carlos Alberto 64'; Aírton Beleza 82'	Report	1' Pelé; 43' Pepe	Stadium: Maracanã; Attendance: 132,550; Referee: Anacleto Pietrobom

===== Tiebreaker =====
Due to the lack of dates, the second leg was cancelled and both clubs agreed to share the title.

10 January 1965 First leg	Botafogo	3–2	Santos	Rio de Janeiro
	Jairzinho 20'; Roberto 40', 43'; Manga (red card); Paulistinha (red card)	Report	49', 70' Coutinho; (red card) Pelé	Stadium: Maracanã; Attendance: 24,068; Referee: Albino Zanferrari

=== Campeonato Paulista ===
Pos	Team	Pld	W	D	L	GF	GA	GD	Pts	Qualification or relegation
1	Santos	30	20	4	6	95	47	+48	44	Champions
2	Palmeiras	30	19	3	8	70	36	+34	41	
3	Portuguesa	30	16	8	6	58	33	+25	40	
4	Corinthians	30	16	8	6	50	34	+16	40	
5	São Paulo	30	12	9	9	51	40	+11	33	

Updated to match(es) played on December 16, 1964. Source: RSSSF.com
Rules for classification: 1) points; 2) goal difference; 3) wins; 4) number of goals scored.

==== Matches ====
5 July 1	América-RP	2–1	Santos	São José do Rio Preto
	Valtinho 72', 75'	Report	14' (pen.) Pelé	Stadium: Mário Alves Mendonça; Referee: Albino Zanferrari

11 July 2	Santos	2–1	Comercial-RP	Santos
	Toninho 18'; Peixinho 85'	Report	62' Luiz Carlos	Stadium: Vila Belmiro; Referee: Stefan Válter Glanz

19 July 3	Santos	5–1	São Paulo	Santos
	Toninho 11', 55'; Peixinho 34', 37', 83'	Report	23' Faustino	Stadium: Vila Belmiro; Referee: Anacleto Pietrobom

26 July 4	Prudentina	1–1	Santos	Presidente Prudente
	Lopes 16' (pen.)	Report	65' Noriva; (red card) Modesto; (red card) Toninho	Stadium: Félix Ribeiro Marcondes; Referee: Airton Vieira de Morais

2 August 5	Santos	3–1	Esportiva Guaratinguetá	Santos
	Toninho 27', 61'; Pepe 59'	Report	76' Roberto	Stadium: Vila Belmiro; Attendance: 6,107; Referee: Valdemar Antonio de Oliveira

9 August 6	Juventus	1–2	Santos	São Paulo
	Gélson 6'	Report	31' Mengálvio; 85' Pepe	Stadium: Rua Javari; Attendance: 12,000; Referee: Teodoro Nitti

16 August 7	Santos	1–0	XV de Piracicaba	Santos
	Pepe 73'	Report		Stadium: Vila Belmiro; Attendance: 9,015; Referee: Carlos Drumond da Costa

19 August 8	Santos	6–1	Guarani	Santos
	Peixinho 7', 16', 70'; Zito 52'; Toninho 67'; Pelé 81' (pen.)	Report	51' Américo	Stadium: Vila Belmiro; Attendance: 9,015; Referee: Carlos Drumond da Costa

23 August 9	Palmeiras	1–2	Santos	São Paulo
	Tupãzinho 90'	Report	55' Pelé; 88' Coutinho	Stadium: Morumbi; Attendance: 38,565; Referee: Armando Marques

30 August 10	Santos	2–1	Ferroviária	Santos
	Toninho 30'; Pepe 52'	Report	50' Pio	Stadium: Vila Belmiro; Attendance: 7,250; Referee: Teodoro Nitti

6 September 11	Botafogo	2–0	Santos	Ribeirão Preto
	Adalberto 17'; Alex 51'	Report		Stadium: Vila Tibério; Referee: Armando Marques

9 September 12	Santos	4–2	Noroeste	Santos
	Zito 53', 72'; Rossi 74' (pen.); Toninho 88'	Report	55' Daniel; 89' Araras	Stadium: Vila Belmiro; Attendance: 4,828; Referee: Albino Zanferrari

23 September 13	São Bento	1–1	Santos	Sorocaba
	Paraná 18' (pen.)	Report	25' (pen.) Pelé	Stadium: Carlos Joel Nelly; Referee: Armando Marques

27 September 14	Portuguesa	4–3	Santos	São Paulo
	Nair 38' (pen.); Dida 49', 80'; Almir 74'	Report	10', 65' (pen.) Pelé; 88' Pepe	Stadium: Pacaembu; Referee: Anacleto Pietrobom

30 September 15	Santos	1–1	Corinthians	São Paulo
	Pelé 37'	Report	5' Silva Batuta	Stadium: Pacaembu; Attendance: 28,571; Referee: Armando Marques

4 October 16	Santos	3–1	América-RP	Santos
	Pelé 31'; Toninho 39'; Peixinho 54'	Report	89' Valtinho	Stadium: Vila Belmiro; Referee: Carlos Drumond da Costa

11 October 17	São Paulo	2–3	Santos	São Paulo
	Roberto Dias 52' (pen.); Carbone 89'	Report	34', 50' Toninho; 61' Peixinho	Stadium: Morumbi; Referee: Armando Marques

14 October 18	Comercial-RP	2–3	Santos	Ribeirão Preto
	Paulo Bin 12'; Ditinho 71'	Report	40' Pelé; 69' Toninho; 84' Pepe	Stadium: Palma Travassos; Attendance: 17,921; Referee: Armando Marques

21 October 19	Esportiva Guaratinguetá	2–0	Santos	Guaratinguetá
	Paulo César 36'; Roberto 79'	Report		Stadium: Benedito Meirelles; Referee: Armando Marques

28 October 20	Santos	8–1	Prudentina	Santos
	Pelé 11', 45' (pen.), 53', 62'; Toninho 29', 65', 78'; Coutinho 30'	Report	14' Mazinho	Stadium: Vila Belmiro; Referee: Valdemar Antonio de Oliveira

1 November 21	XV de Piracicaba	3–6	Santos	Piracicaba
	Valter 53'; Warner 58'; Cabrita 72' (pen.)	Report	11', 30', 61' Pelé; 14' Toninho; 20' Pepe; 75' (o.g.) Neguito	Stadium: Roberto Gomes Pedrosa; Attendance: 9,096; Referee: Albino Zanferrari

7 November 22	Santos	2–3	Palmeiras	Santos
	Coutinho 23', 28'	Report	10' Ademar Pantera; 40', 69' Tupãzinho	Stadium: Vila Belmiro; Referee: Valdemar Antonio de Oliveira

15 November 23	Ferroviária	0–0	Santos	Araraquara
		Report		Stadium: Fonte Luminosa; Attendance: 11,584; Referee: Albino Zanferrari

18 November 24	Guarani	5–1	Santos	Campinas
	Carlinhos 5'; Joãozinho 7'; Babá 44'; Américo 64'; Nelsinho 85'	Report	6' (o.g.) Ditinho	Stadium: Brinco de Ouro; Attendance: 25,258; Referee: Armando Marques

21 November 25	Santos	11–0	Botafogo	Santos
	Pelé 3', 8', 16', 38', 40', 70', 72' (pen.), 73'; Pepe 19'; Coutinho 25'; Toninho 90'	Report		Stadium: Vila Belmiro; Attendance: 9,437; Referee: Carlos Drumond da Costa
Note: Santos' largest win of their history

29 November 26	Noroeste	0–3	Santos	Bauru
		Report	10' Pelé; 40' Toninho; 74' Coutinho	Stadium: Ubaldo de Medeiros; Attendance: 15,860; Referee: Albino Zanferrari

2 December 27	Santos	5–2	Juventus	Santos
	Pelé 11', 20'; Toninho 35', 76'; Coutinho 73'	Report	70', 87' Rodarte	Stadium: Vila Belmiro; Attendance: 8,655; Referee: Romualdo Arppi Filho

6 December 28	Santos	7–4	Corinthians	São Paulo
	Coutinho 17', 33', 83'; Pelé 49', 56' (pen.), 61' (pen.), 89'	Report	6' Ferreirinha; 27' Bazzani; 80', 90' (pen.) Silva Batuta	Stadium: Pacaembu; Attendance: 54,476; Referee: Armando Marques
Note: Record attendance of the stadium

9 December 29	Santos	6–0	São Bento	Santos
	Pelé 29', 36', 75'; João Carlos 53' (o.g.); Coutinho 71'; Mengálvio 76'	Report		Stadium: Vila Belmiro; Referee: Albino Zanferrari

13 December 30	Santos	3–2	Portuguesa	Santos
	Pepe 52', 79'; Toninho 69'	Report	76' Ditão; 80' (o.g.) Ismael	Stadium: Vila Belmiro; Attendance: 17,197; Referee: Armando Marques
Note: Divergencies between Santos' third goal: some places put it as Wilson Silva's own goal, but in Santos counts it as Pepe's goal.

=== Copa Libertadores ===
==== Semifinals ====
15 July First leg	Santos (Brazil)	2–3	(Argentina) Independiente	Rio de Janeiro
	Pepe 23'; Peixinho 34'	Report	39' Rodríguez; 44' Bernao; 89' Suárez	Stadium: Maracanã; Attendance: 23,916; Referee: Arthur Holland

22 July Second leg	Independiente (Argentina)	2–1	(Brazil) Santos	Avellaneda
	Mori 36'; Rodríguez 68'; Guzmán (red card) 83'	Report	38', (red card) 83' Toninho	Stadium: La Doble Visera; Attendance: 70,000~; Referee: Arthur Holland

=== Taça Brasil ===
==== Results summary ====
Overall								Home						Away					
Pld	W	D	L	GF	GA	GD	Pts	W	D	L	GF	GA	GD	W	D	L	GF	GA	GD
6	5	1	0	20	5	+15	12	3	0	0	12	4	+8	2	1	0	8	1	+7

==== Quarterfinals ====
18 October First leg	Atlético Mineiro	1–4	Santos	Belo Horizonte
	Buglê 55'	Report	23', 43' Pepe; 72' Toninho; 82' Pelé	Stadium: Estádio Independência; Attendance: 36,000~; Referee: José Batista dos Santos

25 October Second leg	Santos	5–1	Atlético Mineiro	São Paulo
	Toninho 14', 33'; Pelé 20', 67'; Peixinho 45'	Report	38', Buglê	Stadium: Pacaembu; Attendance: 14,193; Referee: Luís Pereira Filho

==== Semifinals ====
4 November First leg	Santos	3–2	Palmeiras	São Paulo
	Coutinho 24'; Pepe 40'; Pelé 51' (pen.)	Report	43' Gildo; 85' Ademir da Guia	Stadium: Pacaembu; Attendance: 25,000~; Referee: Armando Marques

10 November Second leg	Palmeiras	0–4	Santos	São Paulo
	Ferrari (red card) 59'	Report	56', 75' Pepe; 70' Coutinho; 77' Peixinho	Stadium: Pacaembu; Attendance: 29,000~; Referee: Armando Marques

==== Finals ====
16 December First leg	Santos	4–1	Flamengo	São Paulo
	Pelé 20', 61', 83'; Coutinho 78'	Report	73' Paulo Choco	Stadium: Pacaembu; Attendance: 26,897; Referee: Armando Marques

19 December Second leg	Flamengo	0–0	Santos	Rio de Janeiro
		Report		Stadium: Maracanã; Attendance: 52,508; Referee: Armando Marques
