= Os Santásticos =

Nickname

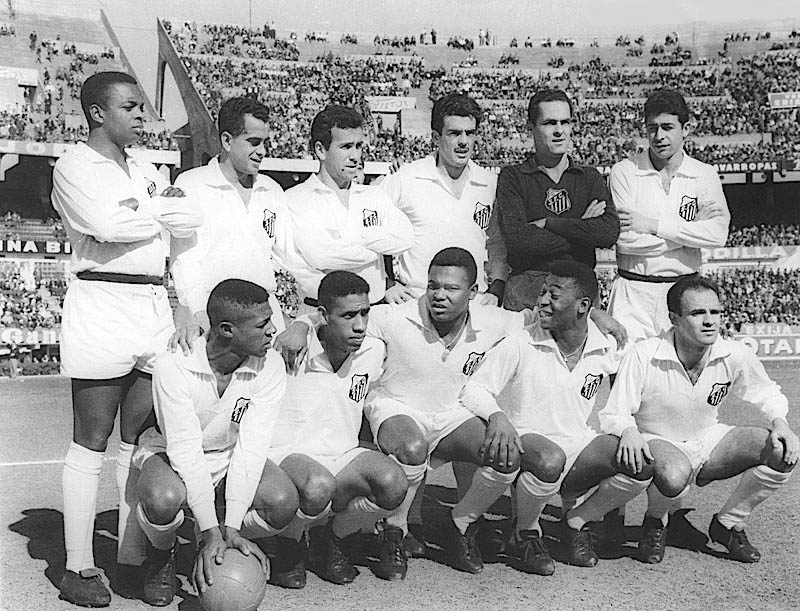
The Santos FC team that won its first Copa Libertadores in 1962 after beating Peñarol 3–0 at River Plate Stadium in Buenos Aires, Argentina, 30 August 1962

Os Santásticos (Brazilian Portuguese: [us sɐ̃ˈtastʃikus], The Santastics) is the nickname for the group of Santos Futebol Clube players coached by Lula and Antoninho that won a total of 25 titles between 1959 and 1974, including two Copa Libertadores. The group is considered one of the strongest teams ever assembled in any sport, scoring over 3000 goals during this period, with an average of over 2.5 goals per match.

Also known as O Balé Branco (Portuguese: [u baˈlɛ ˈbɾɐ̃ku], The White Ballet) or Time dos Sonhos (Portuguese: [ˈtʃĩmi dus ˈsõɲus], Dream Team), they dominated Brazilian football and became a symbol of O Jogo Bonito thanks to figures such as Zito, Gilmar, Mauro, Mengálvio, Coutinho, Pepe and the iconic Pelé. Pelé made Santos FC famous around the world in this revolutionary era, therefore his lesser-known teammates are best known as "Pelé's friends."

== The beginning ==
In 1956, Waldemar de Brito took Pelé to Santos, an industrial and port city in the state of São Paulo, to try out for professional club Santos Futebol Clube telling the directors at Santos that the 15-year-old would be "the greatest football player in the world." Santos were at the time the top team in São Paulo, having just won two consecutive State champions when Pelé joined.

Aged 15, Pelé made his debut for Santos on 7 September 1956, scoring one goal in a 7–1 friendly victory over Corinthians de Santo André. When the 1957 season started, Pelé was given a starting place in the first team and, at the age of just 16, became the top scorer in the league. Just ten months after signing professionally, the teenager was called up to the Brazil national football team. After the World Cup in 1962, wealthy European clubs such as Real Madrid, Juventus and Manchester United tried to sign the young player, but the government of Brazil declared Pelé an "official national treasure" to prevent him from being transferred out of the country.

Pelé won his first major title with Santos in 1958 as the team won the Campeonato Paulista; Pelé would finish the tournament as top scorer with an incredible 58 goals, a record that stands today. A year later, O Rei would help the team earn their first victory in the Torneio Rio-São Paulo with a 3–0 over Vasco da Gama. However, Santos was unable to retain the Paulista title.

== 1961: Brazilian champions ==
In 1960, Pelé scored 33 goals to help his team regain the Campeonato Paulista trophy but lost out on the Rio-São Paulo tournament after finishing in a disappointing 8th place. Another 47 goals from Pelé saw Santos retain the Campeonato Paulista. The club went on to win the Taça Brasil that same year, crushing Bahia in the finals; Pelé finished as top scorer of the tournament with 9 goals. The victory allowed Santos to participate in the Copa Libertadores, the most prestigious continental club tournament in the South America. In March 1961, Pelé scored the gol de placa (goal worthy of a plaque), against Fluminense at the Maracanã. Pelé received the ball on the edge of his own penalty area, and ran the length of the field, eluding opposition players, and fired the ball beyond the goalkeeper. The goal was regarded as being so spectacular that a plaque was commissioned with a dedication to the most beautiful goal in the history of the Maracanã.

== 1962: The first treble in the world ==
Santos' most successful club season started in 1962; the team was seeded in Group 1 alongside Cerro Porteño and Deportivo Municipal, winning every match of their group but one (a 1–1 away draw vs Cerro), with Pelé scoring his first goal in a brace against Cerro. Santos defeated Universidad Católica in the semifinals and met defending champions Peñarol in the finals in which Pelé scored another brace in the playoff match to secure the first title for a Brazilian club. Pelé finished as the second best scorer of the competition with 4 goals. That same year, Santos would defend, with success, the Campeonato Paulista (with 37 goals from Pelé), the Taça Brasil (Pelé scoring four goals in the final series against Botafogo), and win the 1962 Intercontinental Cup against Benfica. Wearing his iconic number 10 shirt, Pelé produced one of his best ever performances and scored a hat-trick in Lisbon, as Santos beat the European champions 5–2.

=== Squad ===
38 players were used throughout the season, with Lima being the most used by playing in 74 matches.

- Goalkeepers
- (Brazil) Carlindo
- (Brazil) Gilmar
- (Brazil) Laércio
- (Brazil) Rosan
- (Brazil) Silas
- Defenders
- (Brazil) Calvet
- (Brazil) Dalmo
- (Brazil) Décio Brito
- (Brazil) Figueiró
- (Brazil) Fioti
- (Brazil) Formiga
- (Brazil) Getúlio
- (Brazil) Hemílton
- (Brazil) Ismael
- (Brazil) João Carlos
- (Brazil) Maneco
- (Brazil) Mauro Ramos
- (Brazil) Olavo
- (Brazil) Zé Carlos
- Midfielders
- (Brazil) Ezequiel
- (Brazil) Lima
- (Brazil) Mengálvio
- (Brazil) Pelé
- (Brazil) Zito
- Forwards
- (Brazil) Bé
- (Brazil) Bira
- (Brazil) Cabralzinho
- (Brazil) Canhoto
- (Brazil) Coutinho
- (Brazil) Didi
- (Brazil) Dorval
- (Brazil) Luís Cláudio
- (Brazil) Nenê
- (Brazil) Osvaldo
- (Brazil) Pagão
- (Brazil) Pepe
- (Brazil) Tite
- (Brazil) Zoca

== 1963–1965: Pentacampeão ==
Santos tried to defend their title again in 1964 but they were thoroughly beaten in both legs of the semifinals by Independiente. Santos won again the Campeonato Paulista, with Pelé netting 34 goals. The club also shared the Rio-São Paulo title with Botafogo and win the Taça Brasil for the fourth consecutive year. The Santistas would try to resurge in 1965 by winning, for the 9th time, the Campeonato Paulista and the Taça Brasil. In the 1965 Copa Libertadores, Santos started convincingly by winning every match of their group in the first round. In the semifinals, Santos met Peñarol in a rematch of the 1962 final. After two legendary matches, a playoff was needed to break the tie. Unlike 1962, Peñarol came out on top and eliminated Santos 2–1. Pelé would, however, finish as the topscorer of the tournament with eight goals.

=== 1963 Squad ===
36 players were used throughout the season, with Dorval being the most used by playing in 61 matches.

- Goalkeepers
- (Brazil) Gilmar
- (Brazil) Laércio
- (Brazil) Silas
- Defenders
- (Brazil) Calvet
- (Brazil) Cido Jacaré
- (Brazil) Dalmo
- (Brazil) Geraldino
- (Brazil) Haroldo
- (Brazil) Hemílton
- (Brazil) Ismael
- (Brazil) João Carlos
- (Brazil) Joel Camargo
- (Brazil) Maneco
- (Brazil) Mauro Ramos
- (Brazil) Olavo
- (Brazil) Zé Carlos
- Midfielders
- (Brazil) Almir
- (Brazil) Lima
- (Brazil) Mengálvio
- (Brazil) Paulo
- (Brazil) Pelé
- (Brazil) Zito
- Forwards
- (Brazil) Batista
- (Brazil) Bé
- (Brazil) Cabralzinho
- (Brazil) Coutinho
- (Brazil) Dorval
- (Brazil) Luís Cláudio
- (Brazil) Nenê
- (Brazil) Nilzo
- (Brazil) Oswaldo
- (Brazil) Pagão
- (Brazil) Pepe
- (Brazil) Rossi
- (Brazil) Tite
- (Brazil) Toninho Guerreiro

=== 1964 Squad ===
32 players were used throughout the season, with Lima being the most used by playing in 68 matches.

- Goalkeepers
- (Brazil) Gilmar
- (Brazil) Laércio
- Defenders
- (Brazil) Calvet
- (Brazil) Cido Jacaré
- (Brazil) Dalmo
- (Brazil) Geraldino
- (Brazil) Haroldo
- (Brazil) Ismael
- (Brazil) João Carlos
- (Brazil) Joel Camargo
- (Brazil) Mauro Ramos
- (Brazil) Modesto
- (Brazil) Olavo
- (Brazil) Turcão
- Midfielders
- (Brazil) Ademir
- (Brazil) Almir
- (Brazil) Lima
- (Brazil) Mengálvio
- (Brazil) Elizeu
- (Brazil) Pelé
- (Brazil) Zito
- Forwards
- (Brazil) Batista
- (Brazil) Chicão
- (Brazil) Coutinho
- (Brazil) Dorval
- (Brazil) Gonçalo
- (Brazil) Íris
- (Brazil) Noriva
- (Brazil) Pepe
- (Brazil) Peixinho
- (Brazil) Rossi
- (Brazil) Toninho Guerreiro

=== 1965 Squad ===
42 players were used throughout the season, with Geraldino being the most used by playing in 67 matches.

- Goalkeepers
- (Brazil) Cláudio Mauriz
- (Brazil) Gilmar
- (Brazil) Laércio
- (Brazil) Silas
- Defenders
- (Brazil) Carlos Alberto
- (Brazil) Cido Jacaré
- (Brazil) Dé
- (Brazil) Geraldino
- (Brazil) Haroldo
- (Brazil) Ismael
- (Brazil) Joel Camargo
- (Brazil) Mauro Ramos
- (Brazil) Modesto
- (Brazil) Oberdan
- (Brazil) Olavo
- (Brazil) Orlando Peçanha
- (Brazil) Quito
- (Brazil) Turcão
- Midfielders
- (Brazil) Ademir
- (Brazil) Almir
- (Brazil) Elizeu
- (Brazil) Gonçalo
- (Brazil) Lima
- (Brazil) Mengálvio
- (Brazil) Pardal
- (Brazil) Pelé
- (Brazil) Rossi
- (Brazil) Vadinho
- (Brazil) Zito
- Forwards
- (Brazil) Abel
- (Brazil) Coutinho
- (Brazil) Dorval
- (Brazil) Del Vecchio
- (Brazil) Gilberto
- (Brazil) Gilson Porto
- (Brazil) Íris
- (Brazil) Noriva
- (Brazil) Peixinho
- (Brazil) Pepe
- (Brazil) Salomão
- (Brazil) Santana
- (Brazil) Toninho Guerreiro

== 1966: A forgettable season ==
In 1966, Pelé and Santos also failed to retain the Taça Brasil as O Rei's goals weren't enough to prevent a 9–4 routing by Cruzeiro (led by Tostão) in the final series. Although Santos won the Campeonato Paulista in 1967, 1968 and 1969, Pelé became less and less a contributing factor to the Santistas now-limited success.

== 1967–1969: Rejuvenation of the Balé Branco ==
On 19 November 1969, Pelé scored his 1000th goal in all competitions. This was a highly anticipated moment in Brazil. The goal, called popularly O Milésimo (The Thousandth), occurred in a match against Vasco da Gama, when Pelé scored from a penalty kick, at the Maracanã Stadium.

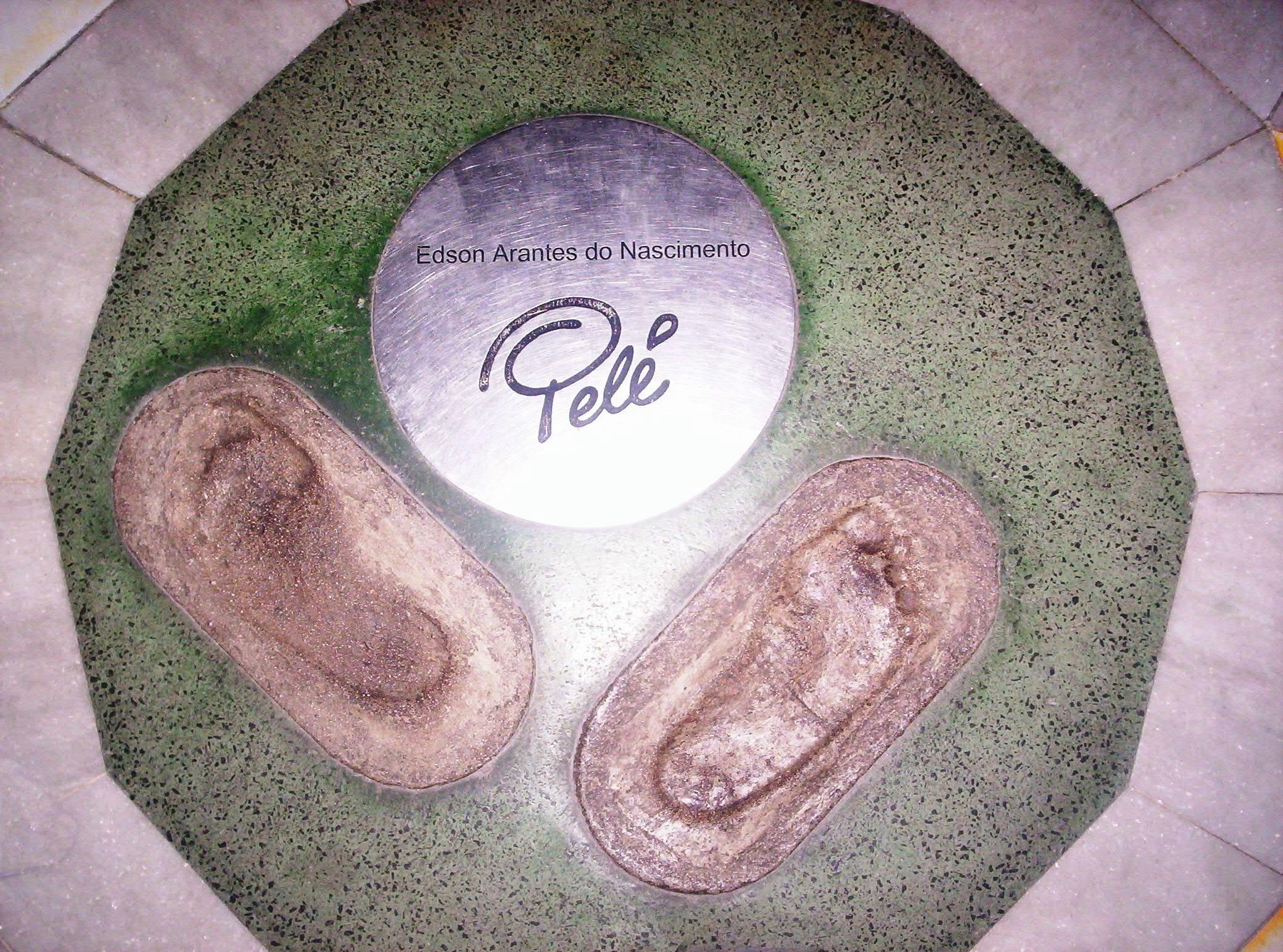
The footprints of Pelé inside the Maracanã.

Pelé states that his most beautiful goal was scored at Rua Javari stadium on a Campeonato Paulista match against São Paulo rival Juventus on 2 August 1959. As there is no video footage of this match, Pelé asked that a computer animation be made of this specific goal. In 1967, the two factions involved in the Nigerian Civil War agreed to a 48-hour ceasefire so they could watch Pelé play an exhibition game in Lagos.

== 1970–1973: The last years ==
After poor investments made by the club's board, Santos had to sell their best players to end their debts. The club also spent the following campaigns with long tours to Africa and Asia to raise funds, while a "reserve" squad played most of the national tournaments.

In 1973, the club won their last trophy with Pelé, the Campeonato Paulista; after a 0–0 draw against Portuguesa, Santos was ahead on the shoot-out when the referee Armando Marques ended the match after miscalculating the score. Shortly after, the title was split between both clubs. Pelé subsequently announced his retirement in the end of the 1974 season.

== See also ==
- Brazil national football team
- Contribution to the Brazil national football team

== Filmography ==
- Aníbal Massaini Neto, Pelé Eterno, 2004.
- Carlos Hugo Christensen, O Rei Pelé, 1963.
- Eduardo Escorel and Luiz Carlos Barreto, Isto é Pelé, 1974.
- Mercado Livre, Santos, Especial, 2011.
- Paulo Machline, Uma história de futebol, 1998.
