= Gilmar =

Brazilian footballer (1930–2013)

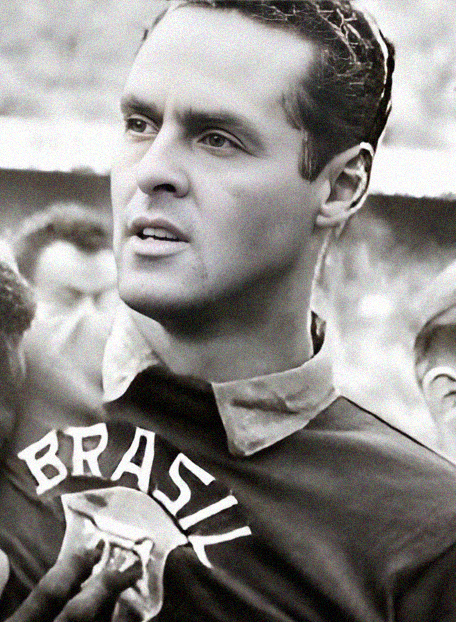
- Gilmar after Brazil's 1958 FIFA World Cup victory

Personal information
- Full name: Gylmar dos Santos Neves
- Date of birth: 22 August 1930
- Place of birth: Santos, São Paulo, Brazil
- Date of death: 25 August 2013 (aged 83)
- Place of death: São Paulo, Brazil
- Height: 1.81 m (5 ft 11 1/2 in)
- Position: Goalkeeper

Youth career
- 1945–1951: Jabaquara

Senior career*
Years	Team	Apps	(Gls)
1951–1961	Corinthians	486	(0)
1961–1969	Santos	266	(0)
Total		752	(0)

International career
1953–1969	Brazil	94	(0)
Medal record
Men's Football
Representing Brazil
FIFA World Cup
Winner	1958 Sweden
Winner	1962 Chile
South American Championship
Runner-up	1953 Peru
Runner-up	1957 Peru
Runner-up	1959 Argentina
- * Club domestic league appearances and goals

Gylmar dos Santos Neves (Brazilian Portuguese: [ʒiwˈmaʁ duˈsɐ̃tuz ˈnɛvis]; 22 August 1930 – 25 August 2013), known simply as Gilmar, was a Brazilian footballer who played goalkeeper for Corinthians and Santos and was a member of the Brazil national team in three World Cups. He was elected the best Brazilian goalkeeper of the 20th century and one of the best in the world by the IFFHS. He is remembered for his sober style on the pitch and his peaceful personality.

Alex Bellos says in his book Futebol: The Brazilian Way of Life that Gilmar is named after his parents, Gilberto and Maria. Gilmar was the starting goalkeeper for Pelé's Santos and Brazilian national teams of the 1960s. In 1998, he was awarded the FIFA Order of Merit.

== Club career ==
Gilmar was born in Santos, São Paulo, and started his career playing for hometown side Jabaquara. In 1951 he joined Corinthians, winning three Campeonato Paulista titles with the club in 1951, 1952 and 1954.

In 1961, Gilmar signed for Santos, being a part of the team who was known as Os Santásticos. An immediate starter, he won five Campeonato Paulista (1962, 1964, 1965, 1967, 1968), five Taça Brasil (1961, 1962, 1963, 1964, 1965), two Copa Libertadores (1962 and 1963) and two Intercontinental Cups (1962 against Eusébio's Benfica and 1963 against Milan).

== International career ==
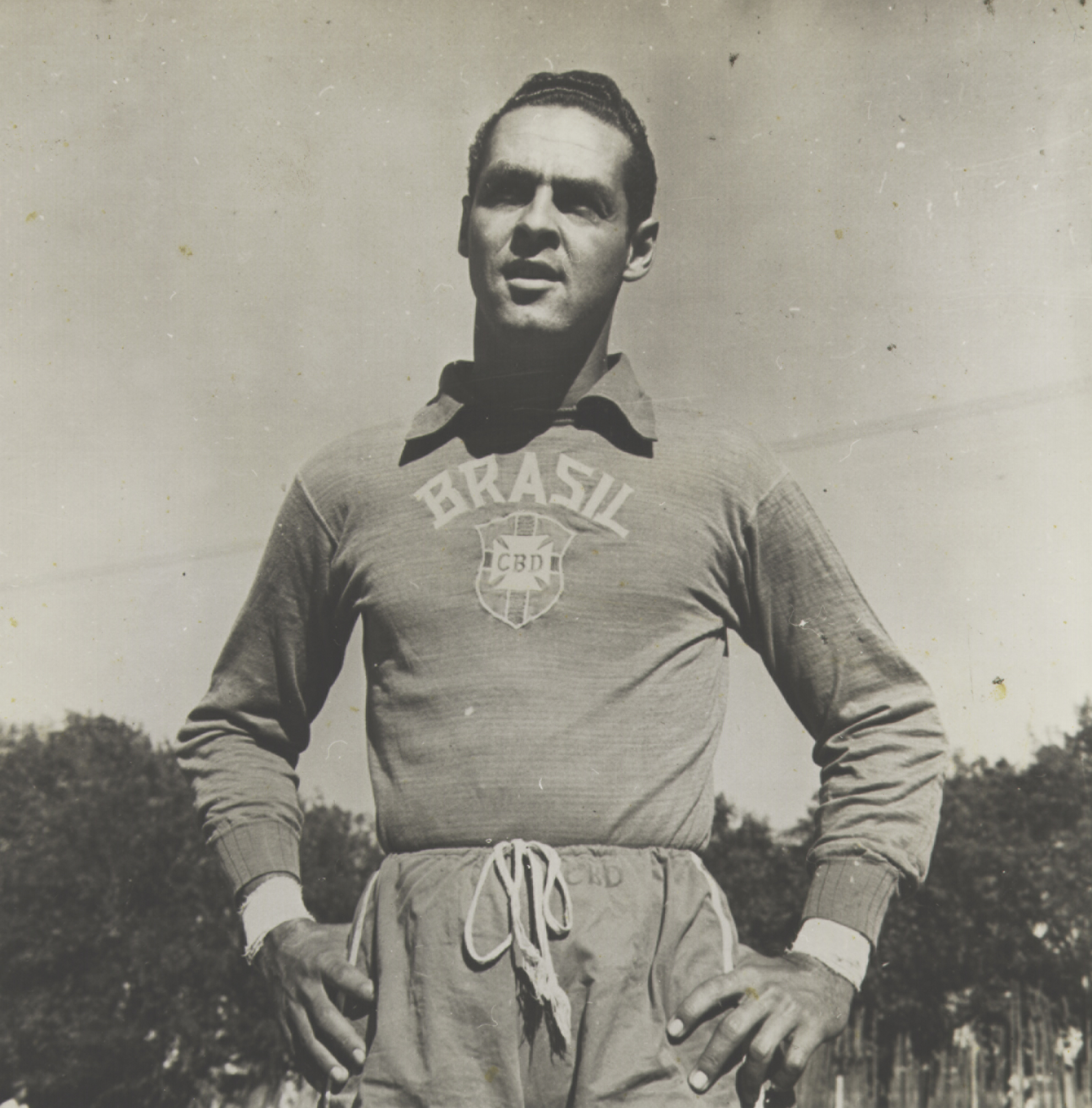
Gilmar in 1962

Gilmar played 94 times with the Brazil national team. He was selected to the national squad for three straight World Cups, between 1958 and 1966. He was part of the starting team in the first two World Cups Brazil won, in 1958 and 1962, and is the only goalkeeper to win two consecutive World Cups in the starting position.

== Style of play ==
Gilmar is regarded by some pundits as one of the greatest Brazilian goalkeepers of all time. In the opinion of Grahame L. Jones, Gilmar was an agile shot-stopper, who possessed excellent reflexes, and who was also known for his composure under pressure, as well as his ability to inspire a sense of calm and confidence in his defenders.

== Death ==
Gilmar died of a stroke on 25 August 2013, three days after his 83rd birthday.

== Honours ==
Corinthians

- Campeonato Paulista: 1951, 1952, 1954
- Torneio Rio–São Paulo: 1953, 1954

Santos

- Campeonato Brasileiro Série A: 1962, 1963, 1964, 1965, 1968
- Campeonato Paulista: 1962, 1964, 1965, 1967, 1968
- Torneio Rio–São Paulo: 1963, 1964, 1966
- Copa Libertadores: 1962, 1963
- Intercontinental Cup: 1962, 1963

Brazil

- FIFA World Cup: 1958, 1962
- Taça do Atlântico: 1956, 1960
- Copa América runner-up: 1953, 1957, 1959

Individual

- Campeonato Paulista Team of the Tournament: 1952, 1954
- Torneio Rio-São Paulo Team of the Tournament: 1954, 1955
