= Poffo =

Poffo is an Italian surname. Notable people with the name are:

- Angelo Poffo (1925–2010), American wrestler and father of:
  - Randy Mario Poffo (1952–2011), wrestler better known as "Macho Man Randy Savage"
  - Lanny Mark Poffo (1954-2023), wrestler better known as "Leaping Lanny" or "The Genius"
- Arnaldo Poffo Garcia (born 1940), Brazilian football forwarder, better known as "Peixinho"
