= Peixinho (Brazilian footballer) =

Brazilian footballer

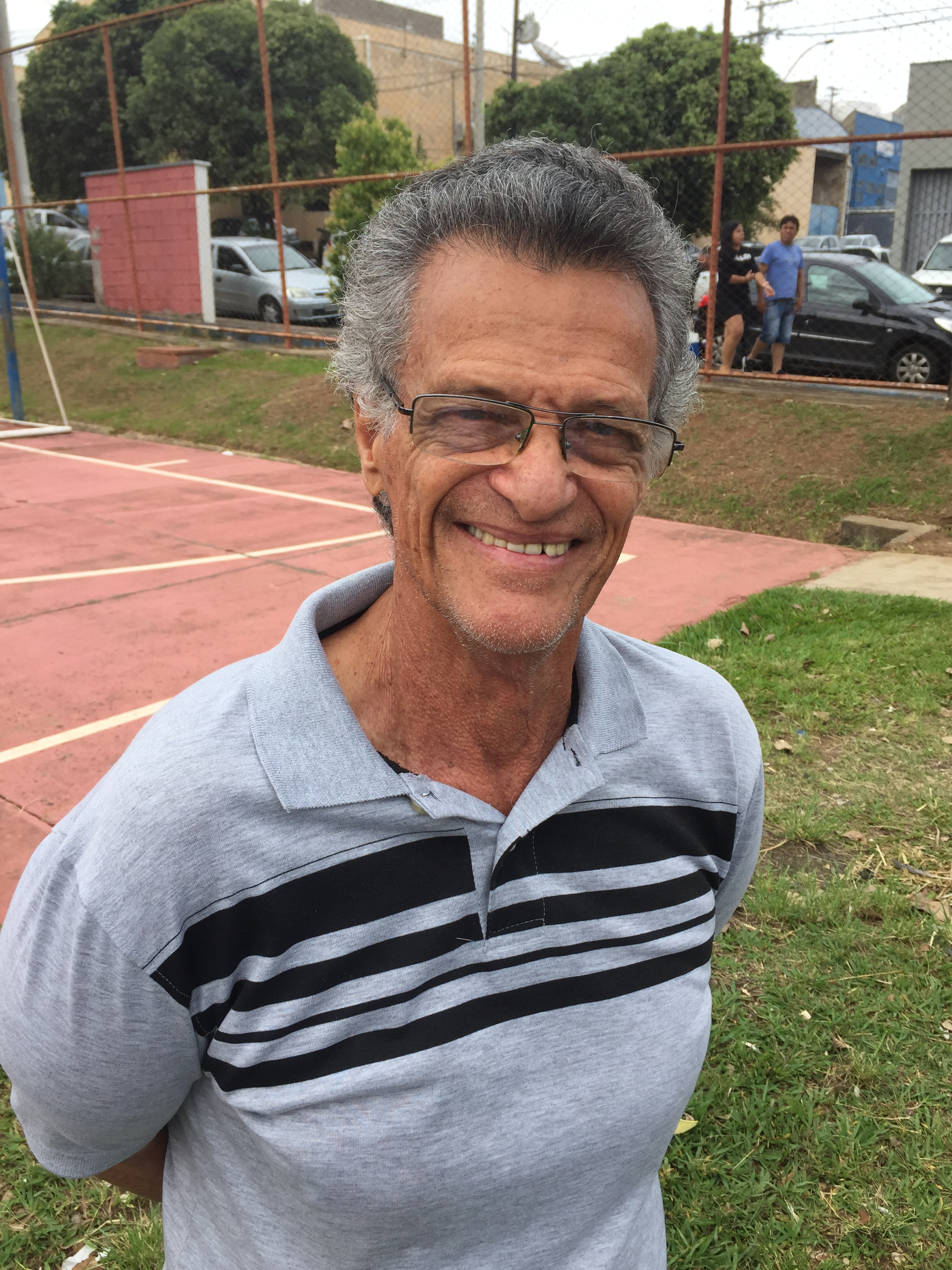
- Peixinho in 2018

Personal information
- Full name: Arnaldo Poffo Garcia
- Date of birth: 2 September 1940 (age 86)
- Place of birth: São Paulo, Brazil
- Position: Forward

Youth career
- 1955–1958: São Paulo

Senior career*
Years	Team	Apps	(Gls)
1959–1961	São Paulo	63	(17)
1961–1964	Ferroviária		
1964–1965	Santos	89	(39)
1966	Comercial-RP		
1967	Bangu		
1967–1969	Ferroviária		
1970	Deportivo Italia		
1970s	Toronto First Portuguese		
- * Club domestic league appearances and goals

Arnaldo Poffo Garcia (born 2 September 1940), better known as Peixinho, is a Brazilian former professional footballer who played as forward.

== Career ==
Even without winning titles, Peixinho entered the history of São Paulo by being the scorer of the first goal in history of Estádio do Morumbi, 2 August 1960, against Sporting CP. The feat was such that in Brazil, the expression "Gol de Peixinho" was created, where the player jumps to head the ball close to the field.

He is son of Peixe, the top scorer of 1940 Campeonato Paulista, which is also why he has the nickname "Peixinho" (English: Little Fish).

== Honours ==
Santos

- Torneio Rio-São Paulo: 1964
- Campeonato Paulista: 1964, 1965
- Taça Brasil: 1964, 1965
