= Haroldo (footballer, born 1937) =

Brazilian footballer

Personal information
- Full name: Theodorico Haroldo de Oliveira
- Date of birth: 1 July 1937
- Place of birth: Rio de Janeiro, Brazil
- Date of death: 12 June 1990 (aged 52)
- Place of death: Rio de Janeiro, Brazil
- Position: Centre back

Senior career*
Years	Team	Apps	(Gls)
- Olaria
1963–1967	Santos	113	(0)
- XV de Piracicaba
- * Club domestic league appearances and goals

Theodorico Haroldo de Oliveira (1 July 1937 – 12 June 1990), known mononymously as Haroldo, was a Brazilian footballer who played as a central defender.

== Honours ==
Santos

- Intercontinental Cup: 1963
- Copa Libertadores: 1963
- Taça Brasil: 1963, 1964
- Torneio Rio – São Paulo: 1963
- Campeonato Paulista: 1964
