= Dário Alegria =

Brazilian footballer (1944–2021)

Personal information
- Full name: Jurandir Dário Gouveia Damasceno dos Santos
- Date of birth: 5 April 1944
- Place of birth: Paracatu, Minas Gerais, Brazil
- Date of death: 9 October 2021 (aged 77)
- Position: Forward

Senior career*
Years	Team	Apps	(Gls)
1964–1965	América-MG		
1965–1967	Palmeiras		
1968	Monterrey		
1968	Fluminense		
1970	Flamengo		
1971	América-MG		
1972	Botafogo-SP		
1972	Caldense		
1973–1974	CEUB-DF		

International career
1965	Brazil	1	(0)
- * Club domestic league appearances and goals

Jurandir Dário Gouveia Damasceno dos Santos, commonly known as Dário or Dário Alegria, (5 April 1944 – 9 October 2021) was a footballer who played as a forward for several clubs in the Campeonato Brasileiro Série A and the Mexican Primera División. He also participated in the Brazil national team.

== Career ==
Born in Paracatu, Minas Gerais, Dário Alegria's father, Luiz, died when Dário was only age 14. His family moved to Brasília, where Dário would be invited to play for CR Vasco da Gama's youth team. He began playing professional football with América Futebol Clube in 1964.

In 1965, Dário Alegria joined Sociedade Esportiva Palmeiras. He would win the 1967 Campeonato Brasileiro with Palmeiras, making him the first player from Paracatu to win a national championship. In 1968, he moved to Mexico to play for C.F. Monterrey for six months before returning to Brazil with Fluminense Football Club.

Dário Alegria won state championships in 1966 (Campeonato Paulista with Palmeiras) and 1971 (Campeonato Mineiro with América) and had brief stints with Clube de Regatas do Flamengo, Botafogo de Ribeirão Preto, Associação Atlética Caldense, Villa Nova Atlético Clube and Olaria Atlético Clube, before he finished his career with Centro de Ensino Unificado de Brasília Esporte Clube.

Dário Alegria made his only appearance for the Brazil national team in a friendly against Uruguay on 7 September 1965.
