= Ademir da Silva =

Brazilian footballer

Ademir
Personal information
- Full name: Ademir da Silva
- Date of birth: 9 May 1947
- Place of birth: Santos, Brazil
- Date of death: 5 January 2001 (aged 53)
- Place of death: São Paulo, Brazil
- Position: Forward

Youth career
- –1965: Santos

Senior career*
Years	Team	Apps	(Gls)
1965–1967	Santos		
1968–1969	Paulista		
1970–1975	Vasco da Gama		
1975	Paulista		
1976	Volta Redonda		
1977	Vasco da Gama		
1977–1978	Londrina		
- * Club domestic league appearances and goals as of 30 September 2024

Ademir da Silva (9 May 1947 – 5 January 2001) was a Brazilian professional footballer who played as a forward.

== Career ==
Born in Santos, he began his career in the youth sectors of Santos FC, being fully promoted to the professional squad in 1965. In 1968 he was exchanged with Tergal of Paulista de Jundaí, where he remained until 1969. In 1970 he arrived at Vasco, the team for which he was state champion and the 1974 Brazilian Championship, scoring one of the goals in the finals. He still played for Volta Redonda and Londrina before retiring.

== Honours ==
Santos

- Campeonato Paulista: 1965, 1967
- Torneio Rio-São Paulo: 1966

Paulista

- Campeonato Paulista Série A2: 1968
- Torneio José Ermírio de Moraes Filho: 1969

Vasco da Gama

- Campeonato Carioca: 1970
- Campeonato Brasileiro: 1974
