= Mário Tilico (footballer, born 1942) =

Brazilian footballer (1942–2019)

Personal information
- Full name: Amaro Gomes da Costa
- Date of birth: 30 April 1942
- Place of birth: Recife, Brazil
- Date of death: 19 December 2019 (aged 77)
- Place of death: Rio de Janeiro, Brazil
- Position: Forward

Youth career
- Santa Cruz

Senior career*
Years	Team	Apps	(Gls)
1961-1962	Santa Cruz		
1962	Portuguesa		
1963–1966	Vasco da Gama	128	(50)
1966–1967	Fluminense	64	(24)
1967–1970	Bangu	84	(27)
1969	→ America-RJ (loan)		
1971	Portuguesa		
1972–1975	Bangu		

International career
1967	Brazil	1	(0)
- * Club domestic league appearances and goals

Amaro Gomes da Costa (30 April 1942 – 19 December 2019), better known as Mário Tilico, was a Brazilian professional footballer who played as a forward.

== Club career ==
Formed in the youth categories of Santa Cruz where did he get the nickname "Mário Tilico", in the second half of 1962, Mário Tilico left Arruda and signed a commitment to Portuguesa de Desportos (SP), a modest first stint, visibly hampered by the lack of adaptation to the climate of the “Land of Drizzle”. He was brought to Vasco in 1963, where he stood out and was champion of the Taça Guanabara in 1965. He repeated the feat the following year at Fluminense, and would still play for Bangu, America and Portuguesa de Desportos.

Mário Tilico was a Vasco striker from 1963 until early 1966, playing in 128 games and scoring 50 goals. He is Vasco da Gama's 5th pernambucano top scorer in with 50 goals scored for the club (tied with Ramón da Silva Ramos) and only behind Ademir Menezes (301 goals), Vavá (150 goals), Juninho (76 goals) and Almir Pernambuquinho (59 goals).

== International career ==
Tilico played only once for the Brazil national team, 19 September 1967, in a friendly match against Chile.

== Personal life and death ==
Tilico was the father of Mário de Oliveira Costa, also known as Mário Tilico.

He died 19 December 2019, in Rio de Janeiro.

== Honours ==
Santa Cruz

- Torneio Quadrangular de Recife: 1961
- Torneio Paraíba-Pernambuco: 1962

Vasco da Gama

- Torneio Internacional da Cidade do México: 1963
- Taça Guanabara: 1965
- Troféu Quarto Centenário da Cidade do Rio de Janeiro: 1965

Fluminense

- Taça Guanabara: 1966
- Torneio Pará-Guanabara: 1966

Bangu

- Torneio Quadrangular dos Campeões: 1968
