= Pepe (footballer, born 1935) =

Brazilian footballer and manager

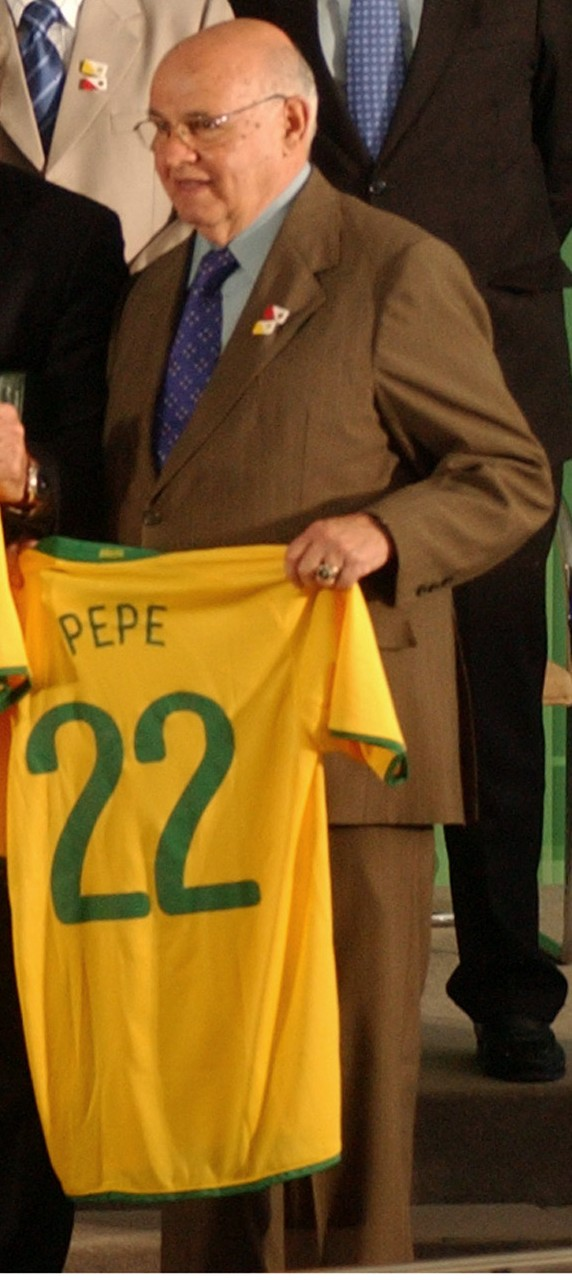
- Pepe receiving an award from the Brazilian government in honor of the two world championships of 1958 and 1962.

Personal information
- Full name: José Macia
- Date of birth: 25 February 1935 (age 91)
- Place of birth: Santos, Brazil
- Height: 1.75 m (5 ft 9 in)
- Positions: Left winger; striker

Senior career*
Years	Team	Apps	(Gls)
1954–1969	Santos	750	(405)

International career
1955–1965	Brazil	41	(22)

Managerial career
- 1972–1974: Santos
- 1975: Santos
- 1978: Paulista
- 1979–1980: Santos
- 1981: Atlético Mineiro
- 1981: São José-SP
- 1982: Náutico
- 1982–1983: Inter de Limeira
- 1983: Inter de Limeira
- 1983–1985: Al Sadd
- 1985: Fortaleza
- 1986: Inter de Limeira
- 1986–1987: São Paulo
- 1987–1989: Boavista
- 1989: Peru
- 1989: Inter de Limeira
- 1989–1990: Santos
- 1992: Verdy Kawasaki
- 1993: Portuguesa
- 1993–1994: Santos
- 1995: Remo
- 1995: Guarani
- 1995: Atlético Paranaense
- 1996: Inter de Limeira
- 1996: Coritiba
- 1996–1997: Inter de Limeira
- 1997: Ituano
- 1997: Criciúma
- 1997: Ponte Preta
- 1998: Inter de Limeira
- 1998: Atlético Paranaense
- 2002–2003: Portuguesa Santista
- 2003: Guarani
- 2003: Portuguesa Santista
- 2004–2005: Al Ahli
Medal record
Men's football
Representing Brazil
FIFA World Cup
Winner	1958 Sweden
Winner	1962 Chile
South American Championship
Runner-up	1957 Peru
- * Club domestic league appearances and goals

José Macia, better known as Pepe (born 25 February 1935), is a Brazilian former football player and manager. He is considered one of the greatest players in the history of Santos FC and one of the greatest left wingers of all time, being two-time World Champion in 1958 and 1962 and two-time World-Club Champion in 1962 and 1963 helping Santos defeat the iconic SL Benfica of Eusébio and the Milan of Cesare Maldini, Trapattoni, Rivera, Amarildo and Altafini in a best-of-three final.

Pepe spent his entire club playing career with Brazilian side Santos (1954–1969), scoring 405 goals in 750 league appearances for the club making him the second best top scorer in the history of Santos only behind Pelé, who scored 1,091 goals.

His nickname was "Canhão da Vila" (The Vila Cannon), because of his potent kick with his left leg and the fact that Santos plays in the Urbano Caldera Stadium, nicknamed Vila Belmiro. He joked that he was "the greatest Santos striker on the planet – because [Pelé is from Saturn".

== Early life ==
At the age of seven, in 1942, Pepe moved with his family to the neighboring city of São Vicente. With his brother, Mário, he started playing football with the teams in the neighborhood where he lived, Comercial FC and Mota Lima. And it was during this period that his left foot started to stand out.

At the age of 16 Pepe was playing for São Vicente AC when Cobrinha, the team's goalkeeper, who also defended Santos' kids, invited him to perform a test at Alvinegro. On 4 May 1951 Pepe stepped on the lawn of Vila Belmiro for the first time, and was approved by coach Salu.

Between the years of 1952 and 1953 Pepe was already under the command of coach Lula, and in 1954, at the age of 19, he had his first chance on the main team. In the junior squad, he varied his position between the left midfielder and the left wing, but in the pros he decided for the left wing and took over the position for many years until the end of his career.

== Club career ==
Pepe debuted on 23 May, in a match against Fluminense, in Pacaembu, for the Rio-São Paulo Tournament. The Santos team lost 2-1, and Pepe entered the second half in the place of Boca, who had already taken the place of Del Vecchio.

Pepe's first great moment as a professional athlete was in the 1955 Paulista Championship. In the last match of the event, Pepe scored the triumph goal against Taubaté, in Vila Belmiro, and with the victory Santos became Paulista Champion for the second time, exactly 20 years after the birth of the young left-winger. By that time, the power of his left foot was already known, which is why he earned the nickname Canhão da Vila. Goals from fouls and penalties became frequent. And on three occasions his left boot also provided olympico goals. (scored directly from a corner kick)

Among the outstanding matches in his career, Pepe likes to highlight the second of the 1963 Intercontinental Cup matches against Milan, at the Maracanã. In the first game, in Milan, Santos lost 4 to 2. In the second, they were losing 2 to 0 at the end of the first half, but the Alvinegro club returned determined in the second half and completely turned the match around to 4 to 2, the same scoreline of the first match. Canhão da Vila scored two goals, both with his powerful left leg, taking a free kick. In the third and decisive match of the Intercontinental Cup (predecessor to the FIFA Club World Cup), which was again played at Maracanã, Peixe won by 1 to 0, with a penalty goal by Dalmo. As Pelé was out of the game due to injury, Pepe would play a huge role in getting the trophy for Santos.

A year earlier, in Lisbon, Santos had become club world champions for the first time after defeating Benfica, who were 2-time defending European champion. Pepe considers this match to be the best in Santos history. Santos beat Eusébio's team 5-2, at the iconic Estádio da Luz. Pelé scored three times, with Coutinho and Pepe scoring one goal each.

On top of the 2 World Cups, Pepe won 25 official club titles, including 11 São Paulo Championships, six Brazilian Championships, 2 Copa Libertadores de América, 2 Intercontinental Cups, and 4 Rio-São Paulo Tournaments, becoming the player with most titles won at a single club. He also holds the record for most wins in the São Paulo Championships, with 13 titles won (11 as Santos player, one as Santos coach and one as coach of Internacional de Limeira), Canhão da Vila is also the record holder for total Brazilian Championships, with 7 titles - six as a Santos player and one as a São Paulo coach.

On 21 September 1967, Pepe received the Prêmio Belfort Duarte in recognition of his exceptional career discipline, having played over 700 matches for Santos without a single ejection.

He held the undisputed command of the Santos left-wing until 1965, when he reached the age of 30. From there until 1969, the year in which he ended his career, he began to share playing time with the young Abel from a Rio de Janeiro club, and after 1966 with Edu, from the Santos academy.

Pepe is one of the rare examples of a player who spent his entire career on a single team. Pepe dedicated 15 years of his life to Santos' professional team, going so far as to refuse million dollar proposals and offers from Europe, to remain loyal to his club. Counting from his first year as a youth prodigy, until his last as a professional, he spent 18 years at the Santos sports club.

== International career ==
Pepe was supposed to be the starting player for the Brazilian team in the 1958 and 1962 campaigns, but twice suffered injuries on the eve of the World Cup and was replaced by Zagallo. The first time, he suffered a blow to the ankle in a friendly match in Italy. In the second, he had a knee sprain in a friendly game at the Morumbi stadium. Pepe received 41 caps with the Brazil national football team, and won both the 1958 and 1962 World Cups. However, he did not appear in any matches in both tournaments.

Upon the passing of Mario Zagallo in 2024, he became the oldest living two-time world cup winner. Then the oldest overall in 2026 when Dino Sani died.

== Managerial career ==
Pepe has a long career as a coach that started in 1969 in the youth ranks of Santos, eventually taking over the main Santos FC team and managing several other Brazilian clubs, including São Paulo and Guarani and the great Portuguese club Boavista.

He coached Santos from 1972 to 1974, obtaining a Paulista State Championship title in 1973, then he went to Paulista FC, he returned to Santos between 1979-1980, then he went to San José and Náutico.

His coaching career brought him to Asia, where he coached in Japan and Qatar. He coached Al Sadd from 1983 till 1984, and succeeded in winning the Emir of Qatar Cup.

In 1985 he directed the Esporte Clube Fortaleza. At the beginning of 1986 he directed the modest Inter de Limeira and surprisingly obtained the Paulista State Championship, as a result of that great campaign a great like Sao Paulo signed him in mid-1986 to 1987, taking the Brazilian Series A Championship, on 25 February 1987. Then he directed the Boavista de Portugal from 1987 to 1989.

In 1989 he was called to lead the Peruvian soccer team that was preparing for the Italy 1990 qualifying rounds where he played a more than discreet role. He returned to Santos at the end of 89 until mid-91. He was in Japan from 1991 to 1993, with Verdi Kawasaki today Tokyo Verdy, being league champion in 93. He managed Guarani FC at the end of 1993, then he returned to Santos in 94, then promoted in 1995 to Atlético Paranaense, being champion of the Brazilian Serie B.

He also coached Al Ahli from 2004 till 2005, where Spanish legend Pep Guardiola was under his supervision.

The last club he led was Ponte Preta in 2006.

== Honours ==
=== Player ===
Santos

==== Official Tournaments ====
- Campeonato Paulista: 1955, 1956, 1958, 1960, 1961, 1962, 1964, 1965, 1967, 1968, 1969
- Torneio Rio–São Paulo: 1959, 1963, 1964, 1966
- Campeonato Brasileiro: 1961, 1962, 1963, 1964, 1965, 1968
- Intercontinental Champions' Supercup: 1968
- Copa Libertadores: 1962, 1963
- Intercontinental Cup: 1962, 1963

==== Friendly tournaments ====
- Tournoi de Paris (France): 1960, 1961
- Taça das Américas: 1963
- Torneio Pentagonal do México: 1959
- Taça Tereza Herrera (Spain): 1959
- Torneio de Valência (Spain): 1959
- Torneio Dr. Mario Echandi (Costa Rica): 1959
- Torneio Giallorosso (Italy): 1960
- Quadrangular de Lima (Peru): 1960
- Torneio Itália 1961 (Italy): 1961
- Torneio Internacional da Costa Rica (Costa Rica): 1961
- Pentagonal de Guadalajara (Mexico): 1961
- Torneio Internacional da Venezuela (Venezuela): 1965
- Hexagonal do Chile (Chile): 1965
- New York Tourney (United States): 1966

==== International ====
Brazil

- FIFA World Cup: 1958, 1962
- Roca Cup: 1957, 1963
- Taça do Atlântico: 1956, 1960
- Taça Bernardo O'Higgins: 1961
- Taça Oswaldo Cruz: 1961, 1962

=== Manager ===
Santos

- 1973 Campeonato Paulista

Fortaleza E.C.

- 1985 Campeonato Cearense

Inter de Limeira

- Campeonato Paulista with Internacional de Limeira in 1986
- 1988 Brazilian Serie B Championship

São Paulo Futebol Clube

- 1986 Brazilian Serie A Championship

Tokyo Verdy

- 1991–92 Japan Soccer League

Atlético Paranaense

- 1995 Brazilian Serie B Championship

== Numbers and records ==
- Biggest winner of the Paulista Championship with 13 titles won (11 as Santos player, 1 as Santos coach and 1 as Inter de Limeira coach.
- Biggest winner of the Brazilian Championship with 7 titles won (6 as Santos player and 1 as São Paulo coach).
- Second player who most played with the shirt of Santos with 750 games.
- Santos' second highest scorer with 405 goals.
- Fourth top scorer of Brazilian clubs behind Pelé with 1091, Roberto Dinamite with 620 and Zico with 500 goals.
- Twenty-third top scorer in the Brazilian Football Team with 22 goals.
- Fifteenth greatest scorer in the history of the Rio-São Paulo Tournament.
- Player who won more titles with the shirt of Santos with 27 official titles, one more than Pelé.

World Cup-winners status
Preceded by Dino Sani	Oldest Living Player since 15 November 2026	Incumbent
