= Marcos (footballer, born 1943) =

Brazilian footballer

- Marcos lining up for Brazil in 1963

Personal information
- Full name: Marcos Pereira Martins
- Date of birth: 1 April 1943 (age 83)
- Place of birth: Santos, Brazil
- Position: Right winger

Senior career*
Years	Team	Apps	(Gls)
1961–1962	Jabaquara		
1963–1969	Corinthians	189	(27)
1968	→ Bangu (loan)		
1969	→ Portuguesa Santista (loan)		
1970–1972	Newell's Old Boys		
1973	Huracán		

International career
1963–1965	Brazil	6	(0)
- * Club domestic league appearances and goals as of 20 February 2024

Marcos Pereira Martins (born 1 April 1943), simply known as Marcos, is a Brazilian former professional footballer who played as a right winger.

== Career ==
Marcos started his career at Jabaquara in 1961, without playing much that season. In 1962, he was the team's highlight, drawing the attention of SC Corinthians due to his dribbling ability. His only title for the club was the Rio-São Paulo Tournament shared in 1966, and for the club he made 189 appearances with 27 goals scored. He was loaned to Bangu as part of the negotiation for Paulo Borges, but did not establish himself. He also played for Portuguesa Santista and in Argentine football.

For the Brazil national team, Marcos participated in six official matches, in addition to other performances in unofficial games like against Arsenal F.C. in 1965.

== Personal life ==
After retiring from football, he worked as a watchmaker and jeweler alongside his uncle.

== Honours ==
Corinthians

- Torneio Rio-São Paulo: 1966 (shared)

Brazil

- Copa Roca: 1963
