= Sergio Rojas (Paraguayan footballer) =

Paraguayan footballer (1940-2010)

Personal information
- Full name: Wenceslao Sérgio Rojas Vargas
- Date of birth: 28 September 1940
- Date of death: 2 August 2010 (aged 64)

International career
Years	Team	Apps	(Gls)
1964–1971	Paraguay	29	(0)

Wenceslao Sérgio Rojas Vargas (28 September 1940 – 6 March 2010) was a Paraguayan footballer. He played for Club Guaraní and 29 matches for the Paraguay national football team from 1964 to 1971. He was also part of Paraguay's squad for the 1967 South American Championship.
