= Ismael (footballer, born 1938) =

Brazilian footballer

Personal information
- Full name: Ismael Mafra Cabral
- Date of birth: 7 February 1938
- Place of birth: Águas da Prata, Brazil
- Date of death: 15 January 2009 (aged 70)
- Place of death: Santo André, Brazil
- Position: Right back

Youth career
- Juventus-SP
- 1955: Palmeiras

Senior career*
Years	Team	Apps	(Gls)
1956–1959	Palmeiras	46	(0)
1959	→ XV de Piracicaba (loan)		
1960–1962	Ferroviária	95	(0)
1962–1965	Santos	91	(0)
1965–1967	Fluminense		
1967	São Paulo	10	(0)
1967	Prudentina		
1968–1969	Coritiba		
- * Club domestic league appearances and goals

Ismael Mafra Cabral (7 February 1938 – 15 January 2009), simply known as Ismael, was a Brazilian footballer who played as a right back.

== Honours ==
Santos

- Intercontinental Cup: 1962, 1963
- Copa Libertadores: 1963
- Taça Brasil: 1962, 1963, 1964
- Torneio Rio – São Paulo: 1963
- Campeonato Paulista: 1964
