= Gonçalo Gonçalves =

Brazilian footballer

Gonçalo
Personal information
- Full name: Gonçalo Gonçalves
- Date of birth: 8 January 1935
- Place of birth: São Vicente, Brazil
- Date of death: 17 December 2016 (aged 81)
- Place of death: Santos, Brazil
- Position: Midfielder

Youth career
- –1955: Portuguesa Santista

Senior career*
| Years | Team | Apps | (Gls) |
| 1955–1959 | Portuguesa Santista | | |
| 1960–1962 | São Paulo | 99 | (17) |
| 1963 | Fluminense | 16 | (1) |
| 1964–1965 | Santos | | |
| 1965 | Fluminense | 7 | (0) |
- * Club domestic league appearances and goals as of 9 October 2023

Gonçalo Gonçalves (8 January 1935 – 17 December 2016), was a Brazilian professional footballer who played as a midfielder.

== Career ==
Trained at Portuguesa Santista, he was part of the squad that won the Blue Ribbon in 1959, considered the best in the club's history. He also played for São Paulo where he made 99 appearances, for Fluminense, and for Santos where he was state champion in 1964. After retiring, he owned a perfumery in the city of Santos.

== Honours ==
Portuguesa Santista

- Fita Azul: 1959

Santos

- Campeonato Paulista: 1965

== Death ==
Gonçalo died at the age of 81, in Santa Casa da Misericórdia Hospital, Santos.
