= 1964 in Brazilian football =

Football in Brazil
- Season: 1964

The following article presents a summary of the 1964 football season in Brazil, which was the 63rd season of competitive football in the country.

== Taça Brasil ==
Semifinals

Team 1	Agg.	Team 2	1st leg	2nd leg
Santos	7-2	Palmeiras	3-2	4-0
Ceará	3-5	Flamengo	1-2	1-3

Final

November 30, 1964

Santos	4–1	Flamengo

December 7, 1964

Flamengo	0–0	Santos

Santos declared as the Taça Brasil champions by aggregate score of 5–1.

== Torneio Rio-São Paulo ==
First Stage

Teams advanced to the final

Position	Team	Points	Played	Won	Drawn	Lost	For	Against	Difference
1	Botafogo	14	9	7	0	2	21	9	12
2	Santos	14	9	7	0	2	21	12	9
3	Palmeiras	10	9	4	2	3	19	15	4
4	Flamengo	10	9	3	4	2	12	11	1
5	Bangu	9	9	3	3	3	11	14	-3
6	Portuguesa	9	9	2	5	2	17	16	1
7	Corinthians	8	9	3	2	4	12	14	-2
8	Vasco da Gama	7	9	2	3	4	10	14	-4
9	Fluminense	5	9	0	5	4	8	13	-5
10	São Paulo	4	9	1	2	6	8	21	-13

Final

January 10, 1965

Botafogo	5–1	Santos

Maracanã

Santos	not played	Botafogo

Due to schedule congestion, the second leg of the final was not played, and both teams, Botafogo and Santos, were declared as the Torneio Rio-São Paulo champions.

== State championship champions ==
State	Champion	State	Champion
Acre	Rio Branco-AC	Pará	Remo
Alagoas	CRB	Paraíba	Campinense
Amapá	Juventus-AP	Paraná	Grêmio Maringá
Amazonas	Nacional	Pernambuco	Náutico
Bahia	Vitória	Piauí	Flamengo-PI
Ceará	Fortaleza	Rio de Janeiro	Eletrovapo; Americano (two championships)
Distrito Federal	Guanabara	Rio Grande do Norte	Alecrim
Espírito Santo	Desportiva	Rio Grande do Sul	Grêmio
Goiás	Atlético Goianiense	Rondônia	Ypiranga-RO
Guanabara	Fluminense	Roraima	-
Maranhão	Sampaio Corrêa	Santa Catarina	Olímpico
Mato Grosso	Operário (VG)	São Paulo	Santos
Mato Grosso do Sul	-	Sergipe	Sergipe
Minas Gerais	Siderúrgica	Tocantins	-

== Brazilian clubs in international competitions ==
Team	Copa Libertadores 1964
Bahia	Preliminary Round
Santos	Semifinals

== Brazil national team ==
The following table lists all the games played by the Brazil national football team in official competitions and friendly matches during 1964.

Date	Opposition	Result	Score	Brazil scorers	Competition
May 30, 1964	England	W	5-1	Rinaldo (2), Pelé, Julinho, Roberto Dias	Nations Cup
June 3, 1964	Argentina	L	0-3	-	Nations Cup
June 7, 1964	Portugal	W	4-1	Gérson (2), Pelé, Jairzinho	Nations Cup
