= Abel Verônico =

Brazilian footballer (born 1941)

Personal information
- Full name: Abel Verônico da Silva Filho
- Date of birth: 2 October 1941 (age 85)
- Place of birth: Rio de Janeiro, Brazil
- Position: Forward

Youth career
- Estrela

Senior career*
Years	Team	Apps	(Gls)
1961–1965	America-RJ		
1965–1971	Santos	326	(29)
1971	Coritiba		
1971	Londrina		
1972	Botafogo-SP		
1972–1976	Atlas		

International career
1965	Brazil	1	(1)

Managerial career
- 1983–1987: Al-Shamal
- * Club domestic league appearances and goals

Abel Verônico da Silva Filho (born 2 October 1941), sometimes known as just Abel, is a Brazilian retired footballer who played as a forward. After retirement, he served as head coach of Qatari club Al Shamal from 1983 to 1987.

== Honours ==
Santos

- Intercontinental Supercup: 1968
- Recopa Sudamericana: 1968
- Campeonato Paulista: 1967, 1968, 1969
