= Paulo Choco =

Brazilian footballer

Personal information
- Full name: Paulo Alves da Silva
- Date of birth: 16 May 1940 (age 86)
- Place of birth: Araguari, Brazil
- Position: Forward

Youth career
- –1961: Anápolis

Senior career*
Years	Team	Apps	(Gls)
1961–1962	Anápolis		
1963–1968	Flamengo	142	(42)
1967	→ Náutico (loan)		
1969	Sport Recife		
1970	Ipiranga-GO		
1971	Anapolino		
1971	Anápolis		
1972	Portuguesa-RJ		
1973–1974	Ríver		
- * Club domestic league appearances and goals as of 8 October 2024

Paulo Alves da Silva (born 16 May 1940), better known as Paulo Choco, is a Brazilian former professional footballer who played as a forward.

== Career ==
Revealed by Anápolis FC, Paulo Choco marked an era when he played for CR Flamengo during the 1960s, being state champion twice, playing 142 matches and scoring 42 goals. He also played in football in Pernambuco, in Portuguesa-RJ and for River, where he was champion in 1973.

== Honours ==
Flamengo

- Campeonato Carioca: 1963, 1965
- Trofeo Naranja: 1964

Ríver

- Campeonato Piauiense: 1973
