= Osvaldo Rossi =

Brazilian footballer

Personal information
- Full name: Osvaldo Rossi
- Date of birth: 5 October 1937 (age 89)
- Place of birth: Belo Horizonte, Brazil
- Position: Forward

Youth career
- Cruzeiro

Senior career*
| Years | Team | Apps | (Gls) |
| 1955–1959 | Botafogo | | |
| 1960–1966 | Cruzeiro | | |
| 1962–1965 | Santos | | |
| 1965–1966 | Cruzeiro | | |
| 1967 | Náutico | | |
| 1968 | Portuguesa Santista | | |
| 1969 | Coritiba | | |
- * Club domestic league appearances and goals as of 13 April 2024

Osvaldo Rossi (born 5 October 1937) is a Brazilian former professional footballer who played as a forward.

== Career ==
Revealed by Cruzeiro, Rossi moved to Botafogo at a young age, where he was part of the state champion squad in 1957. He returned to Cruzeiro in 1960 and was two-time state champion, being top scorer in the 1961 edition. He transferred to Santos at the end of 1962, and in 1963 he was part of the champion squad of the Copa Libertadores and Copa Intercontinental, in addition to Paulista in 1964. He also played for Náutico, Portuguesa Santista and Coritiba.

== Honours ==
Botafogo

- Campeonato Carioca: 1957

Cruzeiro

- Campeonato Mineiro: 1960, 1961

Santos

- Intercontinental Cup: 1963
- Copa Libertadores: 1963
- Campeonato Paulista: 1964

Individual

- 1961 Campeonato Mineiro top scorer: 14 goals
