= Iris DeBrito =

Brazilian footballer (born 1945)

Personal information
- Date of birth: April 15, 1945 (age 81)
- Place of birth: Rio de Janeiro, Brazil
- Position: Striker

Senior career*
Years	Team	Apps	(Gls)
1967	New York Generals	3	(0)
1967	Chicago Spurs	2	(2)
1968	Kansas City Spurs	2	(0)
1968	Toronto Falcons	22	(20)
1971–1972	Rochester Lancers	28	(7)
1973	Toronto First Portuguese		
1974	Denver Dynamos	16	(1)
1976	Chicago Cats		
- * Club domestic league appearances and goals

Iris DeBrito is a Brazilian former professional footballer who played in the North American Soccer League.

In 1967, DeBrito signed with the New York Generals of the National Professional Soccer League. He moved to the Chicago Spurs during the season. In 1968, the NPSL merged with the United Soccer Association to form the North American Soccer League and the Spurs moved to Kansas City where they became the Kansas City Spurs. DeBrito played only two games with the Spurs in 1968 before being traded to the Toronto Falcons. He did not play in the NASL in 1969 or 1970, but returned to the league in 1971 with the Rochester Lancers.

He played in the National Soccer League with Toronto First Portuguese for the 1973 season. In 1974, he began the pre-season with the Los Angeles Aztecs but was traded to the Denver Dynamos a week before the season opener. In 1976, he played in the American Soccer League with Chicago Cats.
