= Olavo (footballer) =

Brazilian footballer (1927–2004)

Personal information
- Full name: Olavo Martins de Oliveira
- Date of birth: 9 November 1927
- Place of birth: Santos, Brazil
- Date of death: 12 March 2004 (aged 76)
- Place of death: Santos, Brazil
- Height: 1.71 m (5 ft 7 1/2 in)
- Position: Centre back

Youth career
- 1947–1949: Portuguesa Santista

Senior career*
Years	Team	Apps	(Gls)
1948–1951	Portuguesa Santista		
1952–1961	Corinthians	514	(17)
1961–1966	Santos	96	(2)
1966	Náutico		

International career
1955–1957	Brazil	4	(0)

Managerial career
- 1975–1976: Santos
- * Club domestic league appearances and goals

Olavo Martins de Oliveira (9 November 1927 – 12 March 2004), simply known as Olavo, was a Brazilian footballer. Mainly a central defender, he was equally capable of acting as a right back.

== Honours ==
=== Club ===
Corinthians

- Campeonato Paulista: 1953, 1954
- Torneio Rio – São Paulo: 1953, 1954

Santos

- Campeonato Paulista: 1962, 1964, 1965
- Intercontinental Cup: 1962
