= Paulo Bin =

Brazilian footballer

Personal information
- Full name: Cleiton Paulo Bin Netto
- Date of birth: 23 March 1941 (age 85)
- Place of birth: Guararapes, Brazil
- Position: Forward

Youth career
- AA Oswaldo Cruz

Senior career*
Years	Team	Apps	(Gls)
1963	Ferroviária		
1963–1965	Comercial-SP		
1966–1967	→ Santos (loan)		
1967–1968	Vasco da Gama		
1969–1972	Ferroviária		
1972–1974	Comercial-SP		
- * Club domestic league appearances and goals as of 4 February 2024

Cleiton Paulo Bin Netto (born 23 March 1941), better known as Paulo Bin or Paulo Bim, is a Brazilian former professional footballer who played as a forward.

== Career ==
Paulo Bin played for the Comercial during the 60s, having the honor of scoring the first goal in the history of the Estádio Palma Travassos against Pelé's Santos. In 1966, he would defend Santos, becoming champion of the Rio-São Paulo Tournament. He also played for Vasco da Gama and Ferroviária.

== Honours ==
Santos

- Torneio Rio-São Paulo: 1966
