= 1964 Campeonato Paulista =

Campeonato Paulista – Série A1
- Season: 1964
- Champions: Santos
- Relegated: Esportiva de Guaratinguetá
- Taça Brasil: Santos; Palmeiras
- Matches: 240
- Goals: 737 (3.07 per match)
- Best Player: Pelé (Santos)
- Top goalscorer: Pelé (Santos) – 34 goals
- Biggest home win: Santos 11-0 Botafogo (November 21, 1964)
- Biggest away win: Noroeste 1-5 Guarani (October 7, 1964); Botafogo 1-5 São Paulo (November 4, 1964)
- Highest scoring: Santos 11-0 Botafogo (November 21, 1964); Corinthians 4-7 Santos (December 6, 1964)

The 1964 Campeonato Paulista de Futebol da Divisão Especial de Profissionais, organized by the Federação Paulista de Futebol, was the 63rd season of São Paulo's top professional football league. Santos won the title for the 8th time. Esportiva de Guaratinguetá was relegated. For the eighth year in a row, the top scorer was Santos's Pelé, with 34 goals.

== Championship ==
The championship was disputed in a double-round robin system, with the team with the most points winning the title and the team with the fewest points being relegated.

Pos	Team	Pld	W	D	L	GF	GA	GD	Pts	Qualification or relegation
1	Santos	30	20	4	6	95	47	+48	44	Champions
2	Palmeiras	30	19	3	8	70	36	+34	41	
3	Portuguesa	30	16	8	6	58	33	+25	40	
4	Corinthians	30	16	8	6	50	34	+16	40	
5	São Paulo	30	12	9	9	51	40	+11	33	
6	América	30	14	3	13	39	35	+4	31	
7	Guarani	30	14	3	13	46	44	+2	31	
8	Comercial	30	12	4	14	47	45	+2	28	
9	São Bento	30	9	10	11	34	38	−4	28	
10	Botafogo	30	8	11	11	41	57	−16	27	
11	Juventus	30	11	4	15	43	59	−16	26	
12	Prudentina	30	9	8	13	43	56	−13	26	
13	Ferroviária	30	8	8	14	29	41	−12	24	
14	XV de Piracicaba	30	9	4	17	32	64	−32	22	
15	Noroeste	30	7	7	16	31	56	−25	21	
16	Esportiva de Guaratinguetá	30	5	8	17	28	52	−24	18	Relegated

Updated to match(es) played on December 16, 1964. Source: RSSSF.com
Rules for classification: 1) points; 2) goal difference; 3) wins; 4) number of goals scored.

== Top Scores ==
Rank	Player	Club	Goals
1	Pelé	Santos	34
2	Flávio Minuano	Corinthians	22
3	Toninho Guerreiro	Santos	21
4	Servílio	Palmeiras	16
4	Emanuele Del Vecchio	São Paulo	16
6	Tupãzinho	Palmeiras	14
6	Silva Batuta	Corinthians	14
7	Américo Murolo	Guarani	13
