= Turcão (footballer, born 1945) =

Brazilian footballer

Personal information
- Full name: Luiz Paes Leme
- Date of birth: 24 January 1945 (age 81)
- Place of birth: Santos, Brazil
- Position: Left-back

Youth career
- –1964: Santos

Senior career*
| Years | Team | Apps | (Gls) |
| 1964–1974 | Santos | 252 | (3) |
| 1965 | → São Cristóvão (loan) | | |
- * Club domestic league appearances and goals as of 21 September 2023

Luiz Paes Leme (born 24 January 1945), simply known as Turcão, is a Brazilian former professional footballer who played as a left-back.

== Career ==
Turcão played for his entire career at Santos, with the exception of 1965 where he was loaned to São Cristóvão FR in Rio.

== Personal life ==
After retiring from football, Turcão worked at Philips for 29 years.

== Honours ==
São Cristóvão

- Campeonato Carioca Série A2: 1965

Santos

- Campeonato Paulista: 1973
