= 1965 Campeonato Paulista =

Campeonato Paulista – Série A1
- Season: 1965
- Champions: Santos
- Relegated: Ferroviária; XV de Piracicaba
- Taça Brasil: Santos; Palmeiras
- Matches: 240
- Goals: 731 (3.05 per match)
- Best Player: Pelé (Santos)
- Top goalscorer: Pelé (Santos) – 50 goals
- Biggest home win: São Paulo 8-0 Noroeste (November 7, 1965)
- Biggest away win: Botafogo 1-7 Santos (September 4, 1965)
- Highest scoring: Noroeste 6-3 Ferroviária (August 1, 1965)

The 1965 Campeonato Paulista de Futebol da Divisão Especial de Profissionais, organized by the Federação Paulista de Futebol, was the 64th season of São Paulo's top professional football league. Santos won the title for the 9th time. Ferroviária and XV de Piracicaba were relegated. For the ninth consecutive year, the top scorer was Santos's Pelé, scoring 50 goals.

== Championship ==
The championship was disputed in a double-round robin system, with the team with the most points winning the title and the two teams with the fewest points being relegated.

Pos	Team	Pld	W	D	L	GF	GA	GD	Pts	Qualification or relegation
1	Santos	30	25	3	2	93	28	+65	53	Champions
2	Palmeiras	30	22	5	3	55	25	+30	49	
3	Corinthians	30	21	3	6	74	36	+38	45	
4	Portuguesa	30	13	9	8	43	34	+9	35	
5	São Paulo	30	13	7	10	52	32	+20	33	
6	São Bento	30	12	7	11	46	50	−4	31	
7	Guarani	30	13	4	13	45	47	−2	30	
8	Comercial	30	12	4	14	50	53	−3	28	
9	Prudentina	30	10	7	13	45	47	−2	27	
10	América	30	10	6	14	32	45	−13	26	
11	Noroeste	30	9	7	14	35	59	−24	25	
12	Juventus	30	9	6	15	45	61	−16	24	
13	Botafogo	30	8	8	14	37	48	−11	24	
14	Portuguesa Santista	30	5	9	16	20	48	−28	19	
15	XV de Piracicaba	30	6	6	18	27	60	−33	18	Relegated
16	Ferroviária	30	4	5	21	32	58	−26	13	Relegated

Updated to match(es) played on December 16, 1965. Source: RSSSF.com
Rules for classification: 1) points; 2) goal difference; 3) wins; 4) number of goals scored.

== Top Scores ==
Rank	Player	Club	Goals
1	Pelé	Santos	50
2	Flávio Minuano	Corinthians	30
3	Prado	São Paulo	26
4	Servílio	Palmeiras	18
5	Babá	Guaraní	17
6	Ademar Pantera	Palmeiras	14
6	Paulo Bin	Comercial	14
8	Coutinho	Santos	13
9	Américo Murolo	Guarani	12
10	Toninho Guerreiro	Santos	11
10	Luís	Comercial	11
