= Toninho Guerreiro =

Brazilian footballer (1942–1990)

Personal information
- Full name: Antônio Ferreira
- Date of birth: 10 August 1942
- Place of birth: Bauru, Brazil
- Date of death: 26 January 1990 (aged 47)
- Place of death: Bauru, Brazil
- Position: Centre forward

Senior career*
Years	Team	Apps	(Gls)
1960–1962	Noroeste		
1963–1969	Santos	373	(283)
1969–1974	São Paulo	170	(85)
1973	→ Flamengo (loan)		
1974	→ Operário de Campo Grande (loan)		
1975	Noroeste		
1976	Montreal Castors		

International career
1968–1969	Brazil		
- * Club domestic league appearances and goals

Antônio Ferreira (10 August 1942 – 26 January 1990), usually known as Toninho Guerreiro, was a Brazilian footballer who played as a forward.

He played for Santos FC with Pelé as a forward in the 1960s, scoring 283 goals in 373 games (.758 goals per game) and scoring more goals than Pelé in 66 (60 goals) and 68 (75 goals). He is Santos FC's fourth-highest scorer of all time. He won 1963 Copa Libertadores and 1963 Intercontinental Cup.

He also played for São Paulo FC in the 1970s where he won the Paulista Championship twice being their top scorer. In 1976, he played abroad in the National Soccer League with Montreal Castors.

Many say he should have gone to the 1970 FIFA World Cup and was on João Saldanha's list. In the end, Dadá Maravilha took his place and rumour has it that he made it because of the Brazilian President's wish. He played only once for Brazil, scoring a single goal.

== Honours ==
Santos

- Intercontinental Cup: 1963
- Copa Libertadores: 1963
- Campeonato Brasileiro Série A: 1964, 1965, 1968
- Torneio Rio-São Paulo: 1963, 1964, 1966
- Campeonato Paulista: 1964, 1965, 1967, 1968, 1969

São Paulo

- Campeonato Paulista: 1970, 1971
