= Taça Brasil =

- Founded: 1959
- Abolished: 1968
- Region: Brazil
- Number of teams: 23 (in 1968)
- Most successful club(s): Santos (5 titles)

The Taça Brasil (English: Brazil Cup) was the Brazilian national football championship contested from 1959 to 1968.

Bahia, Cruzeiro and Botafogo were the only champions to have played all phases of the tournament, because until the 1968 edition teams from Rio de Janeiro and São Paulo were already qualified to the semi-finals. Both Cruzeiro and Bahia, the only champions not from Rio or São Paulo, beat the Santos Futebol Clube whose players included Pelé, Coutinho and Pepe.

In 1989 the Copa do Brasil was created, in the same cup-style and also qualifying to the Copa Libertadores.

== Relationship with the Copa Libertadores ==
The Taça Brasil was founded to enable Brazil to provide contenders for the newly created Copa Libertadores de América.

From 1959 to 1964 the winner of Taça Brasil was selected to be the sole Brazilian competitor in the next year's Copa Libertadores. In 1965 and 1966, the two finalists of the Taça Brasil were both chosen to represent Brazil in the next year's Copa Libertadores, which was expanded in 1966. In 1967 and 1968, the winner of the Taça Brasil qualified for the next year's Copa Libertadores, along with the winner of the Torneio Roberto Gomes Pedrosa (also known as the "Taça de Prata"). 1968 was the last year the Taça Brasil was contested; in 1969 and 1970 the top two teams in the Torneio Roberto Gomes Pedrosa became the two Brazilian entrants in the following year's Copa Libertadores, before the formation of the Campeonato Brasileiro, a Brazilian national league championship, in 1971.

== Champions ==
Year	Final			Semifinalists
Year	Winner	Score	Runner-up	Semifinalists
1959; Details	Bahia	3 - 2; 0 - 2; 3 - 1	(São Paulo (state)); Santos	(Rio de Janeiro (state)); Vasco da Gama	(Rio Grande do Sul); Grêmio
1960; Details	(São Paulo (state)); Palmeiras	3 - 1; 8 - 2	(Ceará); Fortaleza	(Rio de Janeiro (state)); Fluminense	(Pernambuco); Santa Cruz
1961; Details	(São Paulo (state)); Santos	1 - 1; 5 - 1	Bahia	(Rio de Janeiro (state)); América	(Pernambuco); Náutico
1962; Details	(São Paulo (state)); Santos	4 - 3; 1 - 3; 5 - 0	(Rio de Janeiro (state)); Botafogo	(Pernambuco); Sport Recife	(Rio Grande do Sul); Internacional
1963; Details	(São Paulo (state)); Santos	6 - 0; 2 - 0	Bahia	(Rio Grande do Sul); Grêmio	(Rio de Janeiro (state)); Botafogo
1964; Details	(São Paulo (state)); Santos	4 - 1; 0 - 0	(Rio de Janeiro (state)); Flamengo	(São Paulo (state)); Palmeiras	Ceará
1965; Details	(São Paulo (state)); Santos	5 - 1; 1 - 0	(Rio de Janeiro (state)); Vasco da Gama	(São Paulo (state)); Palmeiras	(Pernambuco); Náutico
1966; Details	(Minas Gerais); Cruzeiro	6 - 2; 3 - 2	(São Paulo (state)); Santos	(Rio de Janeiro (state)); Fluminense	(Pernambuco); Náutico
1967; Details	(São Paulo (state)); Palmeiras	3 - 1; 1 - 2; 2 - 0	(Pernambuco); Náutico	(Rio Grande do Sul); Grêmio	(Minas Gerais); Cruzeiro
1968; Details	(Rio de Janeiro (state)); Botafogo	2 - 2; 4 - 0	(Ceará); Fortaleza	(Minas Gerais); Cruzeiro	(Pernambuco); Náutico

== Titles by team ==
- 5 titles
  - Santos
- 2 titles
  - Palmeiras
- 1 title
  - Bahia
  - Botafogo
  - Cruzeiro

== Top goal scorers ==
Source: RSSSF Brazil

- 1959 - 8 goals - Léo (Bahia)
- 1960 - 7 goals - Bececê (Fortaleza)
- 1961 - 7 goals - Pelé (Santos)
- 1962 - 7 goals - Coutinho (Santos)
- 1963 - 8 goals - Pelé (Santos)
- 1964 - 7 goals - Pelé (Santos) and Gildo (Ceará)
- 1965 - 10 goals - Alcindo (Grêmio)
- 1966 - 10 goals - Bita (Náutico) and Toninho Guerreiro (Santos)
- 1967 - 9 goals - Chiclete (Treze)
- 1968 - 7 goals - Fernando Ferreti (Botafogo)

== Appearances ==
- 9 seasons: Grêmio
- 7 seasons: ABC, Campinense, Paysandu, Santos
- 6 seasons: Bahia, Cruzeiro, CSA, Náutico, Palmeiras
- 5 seasons: Fortaleza, Metropol (SC), Rio Branco (ES)
- 4 seasons: Atlético Mineiro, Botafogo, Ceará, Moto Club, Sampaio Corrêa
- 3 seasons: Confiança, Desportiva, Fonseca (RJ), Goytacaz, Rabello (DF), Ríver, Sergipe, Sport Recife
- 2 seasons: Alecrim, Atlético Goianiense, Capelense, Coritiba, CRB, Ferroviário (PR), Flamengo (PI), Fluminense (RJ), Grêmio Maringá, Nacional (AM), Piauí, Remo, Santa Cruz (SE), Santo Antônio (ES), Vasco da Gama, Vila Nova, Vitória (BA)
- 1 season: América (CE), America (RJ), América (RN), América de Propriá, Americano, Anápolis, Atlético Paranaense, Auto Esporte (PB), Comercial (PR), Cruzeiro do Sul (DF), Defelê (DF), Eletrovapo (RJ), Estrela do Mar (PB), Ferroviário (MA), Flamengo (RJ), Fluminense de Feira, Goiás, Guanabara (DF), Hercílio Luz, Inter de Lages, Internacional, Leônico, Londrina, Manufatora (RJ), Maranhão, Olímpico (AM), Olímpico (SC), Operário (MT), Paula Ramos (SC), Perdigão (SC), Pinheiros (PR), Rio Branco (RJ), Rio Negro (AM), Santa Cruz (PE). Siderúrgica, Treze, Tuna Luso
