= 1964 Campeonato Brasileiro Série A =

Campeonato Brasileiro Série A
- Season: 1964
- Dates: 26 July – 19 December 1964
- Champions: Santos (4th title)
- Copa Libertadores: Santos
- Matches: 49
- Goals: 152 (3.1 per match)
- Top goalscorer: Gildo - Ceará (8 goals)
- Biggest home win: Santos 5-1 Atlético Mineiro
- Biggest away win: Paysandu 0-6 Náutico
- Highest scoring: Santos 5-1 Atlético Mineiro; Paysandu 0-6 Náutico

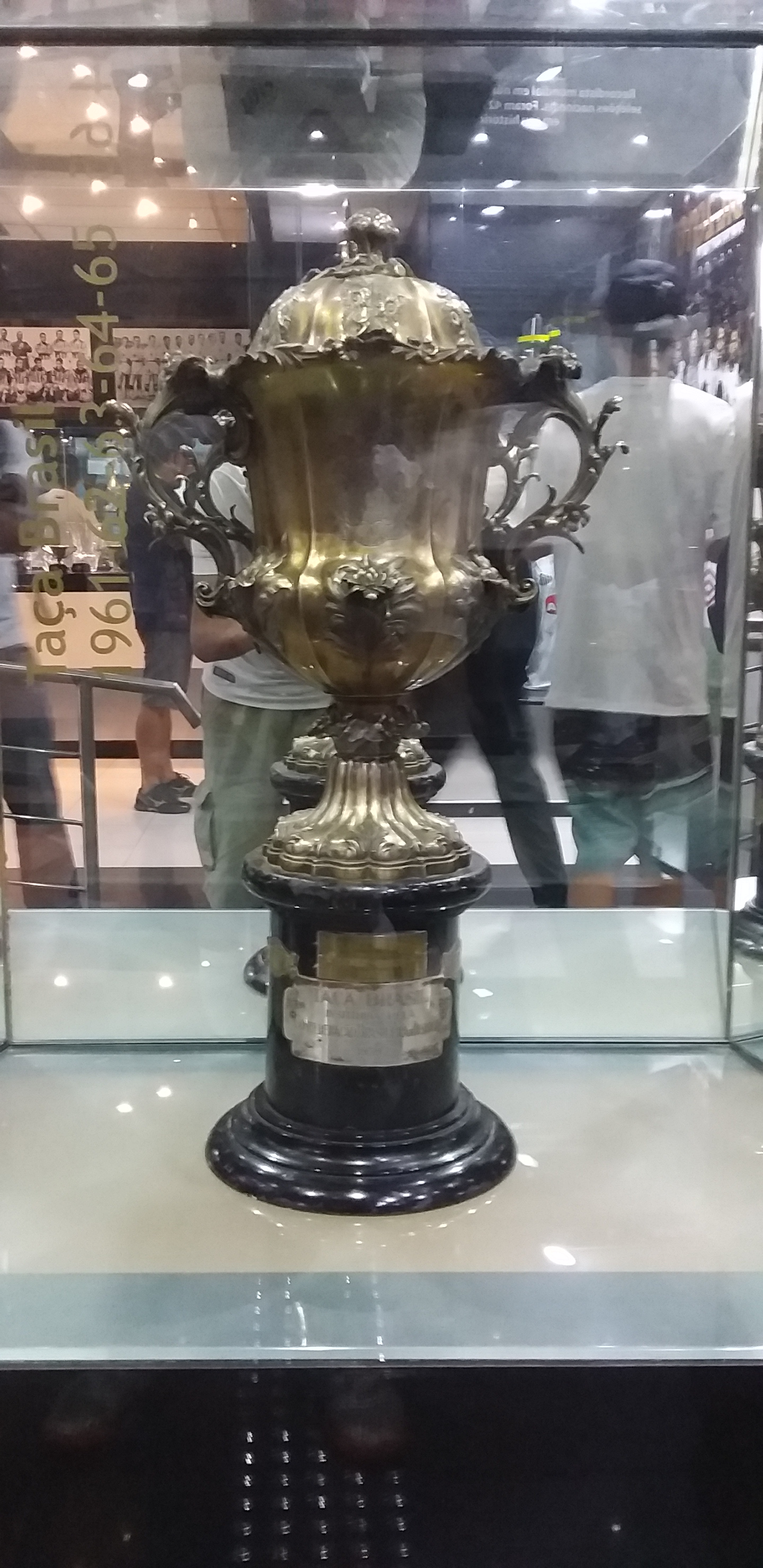
Brazil Cup won by Santos FC in 1965 after winning the Brazilian Championship five times in a row in the 60s on display at the Memorial das Conquistas

The 1964 Campeonato Brasileiro Série A (officially the 1964 Taça Brasil) was the 7th edition of the Campeonato Brasileiro Série A. Santos won its fourth title in a row, beating Flamengo in the finals.

== Preliminary round ==
=== Northern Group ===
Teams			Scores		Tie-breaker	
Team 1	Points	Team 2	1st leg	2nd leg	3rd leg	GD
Northern Group First Stage
Paysandu (Pará)	3:1	(Amazonas (Brazilian state)) Nacional	2:0	1:1	–	—
River (Piauí)	2:2	Maranhão	4:1	2:3	1:2	–
Northern Group Semifinal
Paysandu (Pará)	3:1	Maranhão	2:2	1:0	—	—
Northern Final
Náutico (Pernambuco)	4:0	(Pará) Paysandu	3:1	6:0	—	—

=== Northeastern Group ===
Teams			Scores		Tie-breaker	
Team 1	Points	Team 2	1st leg	2nd leg	3rd leg	GD
Northeastern Group First Stage
Alecrim (Rio Grande do Norte)	0:4	(Paraíba) Campinense	2:3	0:4	–	—
Confiança (Sergipe)	2:2	(Alagoas) CSA	2:0	0:1	3:1	—
Northeastern Group Semifinals
Campinense (Paraíba)	2:2	(Sergipe) Confiança	2:1	1:4	0:2	—
Northeastern Group Finals
Ceará	2:2	(Sergipe) Confiança	3:0	1:2	2:1	—

=== Northern Zone Finals ===
Teams			Scores		Tie-breaker	
Team 1	Points	Team 2	1st leg	2nd leg	3rd leg	GD
Náutico (Pernambuco)	2:2	Ceará	3:0	0:1	0:4	—

== Southern Zone ==
=== Southern Group ===
Teams			Scores		Tie-breaker	
Team 1	Points	Team 2	1st leg	2nd leg	3rd leg	GD
Northeastern Group First Stage
Metropol (Santa Catarina (state))	3:1	(Paraná (state)) Grêmio Maringá	1:1	2:1	–	—
Southern Group Finals
Grêmio (Rio Grande do Sul)	1:3	(Santa Catarina (state)) Metropol	1:1	0:2	—	—

=== Central Group ===
Teams			Scores		Tie-breaker	
Team 1	Points	Team 2	1st leg	2nd leg	3rd leg	GD
Quarterfinals
Vila Nova (Goiás)	3:1	(Federal District (Brazil)) Cruzeiro do Sul	3:1	2:2	–	–
Rio Branco-ES (Espírito Santo)	3:1	(Rio de Janeiro (state)) Goytacaz	1:1	3:0	–	–
Semifinals
Vila Nova (Goiás)	2:2	(Espírito Santo) Rio Branco-ES	2:1	0:4	0:2	–
Central zone final
Rio Branco-ES (Espírito Santo)	1:3	(Minas Gerais) Atlético Mineiro	1:1	0:1	–	–

=== Southern Zone Finals ===
Teams			Scores		Tie-breaker	
Team 1	Points	Team 2	1st leg	2nd leg	3rd leg	GD
Atlético Mineiro (Minas Gerais)	4:0	(Santa Catarina (state)) Metropol	1:0	2:1	–	—

== Quarterfinals ==
Teams			Scores		Tie-breaker	
Team 1	Points	Team 2	1st leg	2nd leg	3rd leg	GD
Northern Zone Decision
Fluminense de Feira (Bahia)	2:2	Ceará	2:1	0:2	0:2	—
Southern Zone Decision
Atlético Mineiro (Minas Gerais)	0:4	(São Paulo (state)) Santos	1:4	1:5	—	—

== Semifinals ==
Palmeiras and Flamengo enter in this stage

Teams			Scores		Tie-breaker
Team 1	Points	Team 2	1st leg	2nd leg	3rd leg
Santos (São Paulo (state))	4:0	(São Paulo (state)) Palmeiras	3:2	4:0	—
Ceará	0:4	(Guanabara (state)) Flamengo	1:2	1:3	—

== Finals ==
16 December 1964

Santos	4–1	Flamengo
Pelé (3); Coutinho		Paulo Choco

Estádio do Pacaembu, São Paulo
Attendance: 26,897
Referee: Armando Marques

19 December 1964

Flamengo	0–0 (1–4 agg.)	Santos

Maracanã, Rio de Janeiro
Attendance: 52,508
Referee: Armando Marques
