= 1961 Copa Libertadores finals =

1961 Copa de Campeones finals
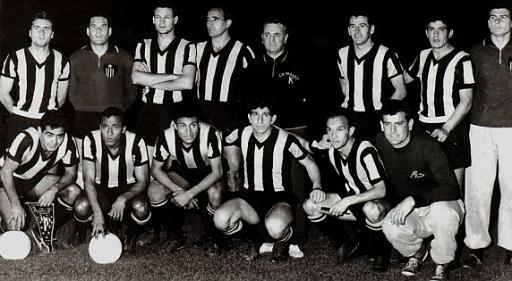
- Peñarol, champions
- Event: 1961 Copa de Campeones de América
Peñarol	Palmeiras
(Uruguay)	(Brazil)
2	1
- Peñarol won 3–1 on points.

First leg
Peñarol	Palmeiras
1	0
- Date: June 4, 1961
- Venue: Estadio Centenario, Montevideo
- Referee: José Luis Praddaude (Argentina)
- Attendance: 64,376

Second leg
Palmeiras	Peñarol
1	1
- Date: June 11, 1961
- Venue: Estádio do Pacaembu, São Paulo
- Referee: José Luis Praddaude (Argentina)
- Attendance: 50,000

The 1961 Copa de Campeones de América finals was a football series between Peñarol and Palmeiras on June 4 and June 11 of this same year. It was the second final of South America's most prestigious football competition, the Copa de Campeones (known in the modern era as the Copa Libertadores). Defending champions Peñarol were appearing in their second consecutive final, whereas Palmeiras were seeking to win the competition for the first time. Both finalists reached the final with relative ease as each of them won three of their four matches.

Each club needed to win two group series to reach the final. Peñarol's victories were incredibly one-sided affairs, each effectively settled by the first leg, as they thumped Universitario of Peru 5–0 in the first leg of their quarterfinal group. Peñarol even dispatched Olimpia in the semifinals with little difficulty as they won both matches of the series in a rematch of the previous year's finals. Palmeiras made similar comfortable progress: they scored nine goals while conceding only three after beating Independiente away and crushing Independiente Santa Fe 4–1 at home.

Like the previous edition, Alberto Spencer scored a late goal in the first leg of the final to give his team a slight lead. Going into São Paulo, José Sasía scored in the first two minutes of the match in order to give Peñarol their second consecutive title in the competition. Sacia's goal also became the fastest goal to be scored on a final match. José Luis Praddaude became the first, and so far only, referee to officiate both matches of the final series in this competition. He also refereed the second leg of the 1960 final.

== Qualified teams ==
Team	Previous finals appearances (bold indicates winners)
(Uruguay) Peñarol	**1960**
(Brazil) Palmeiras	None

== Stadiums ==
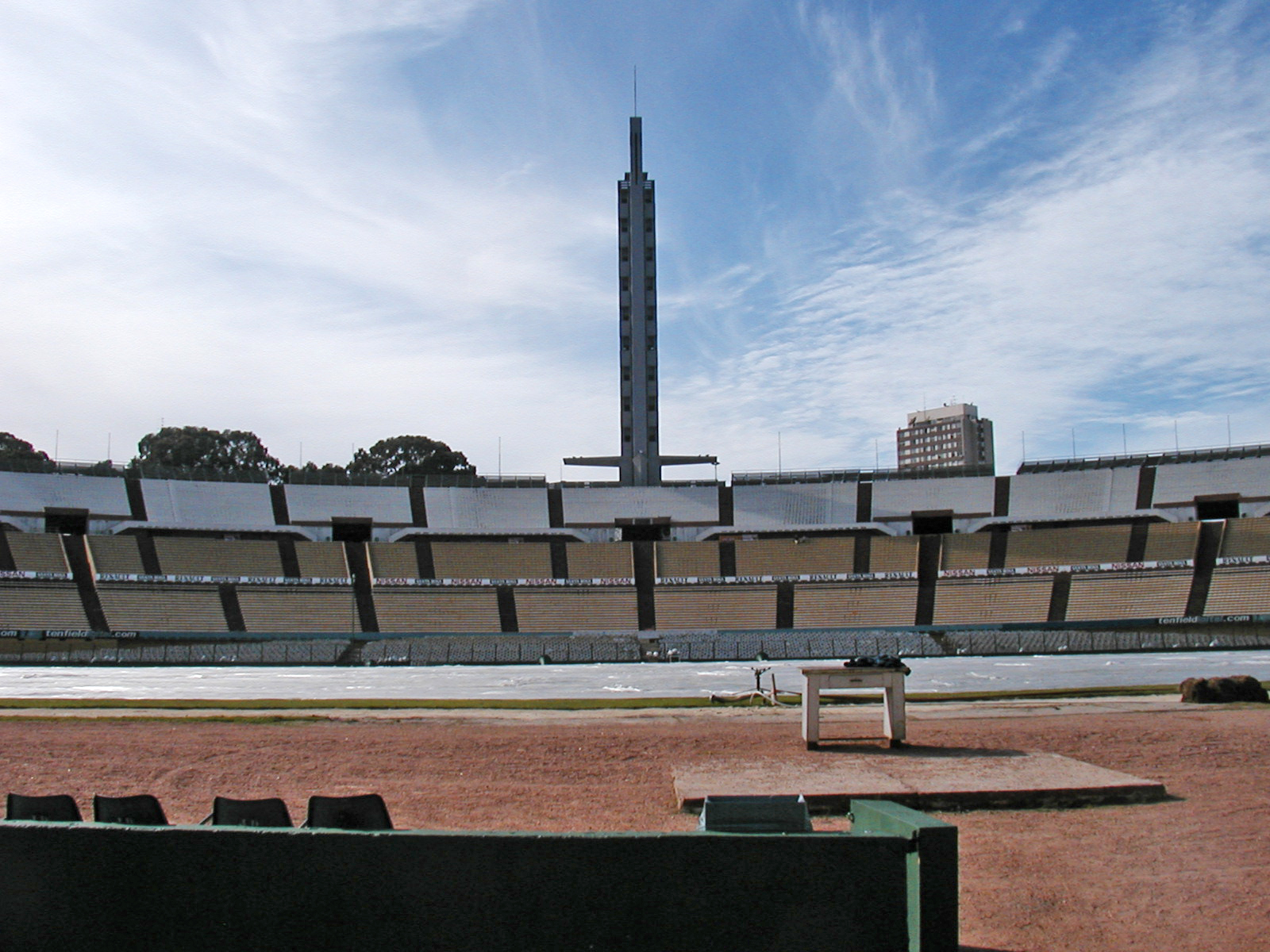
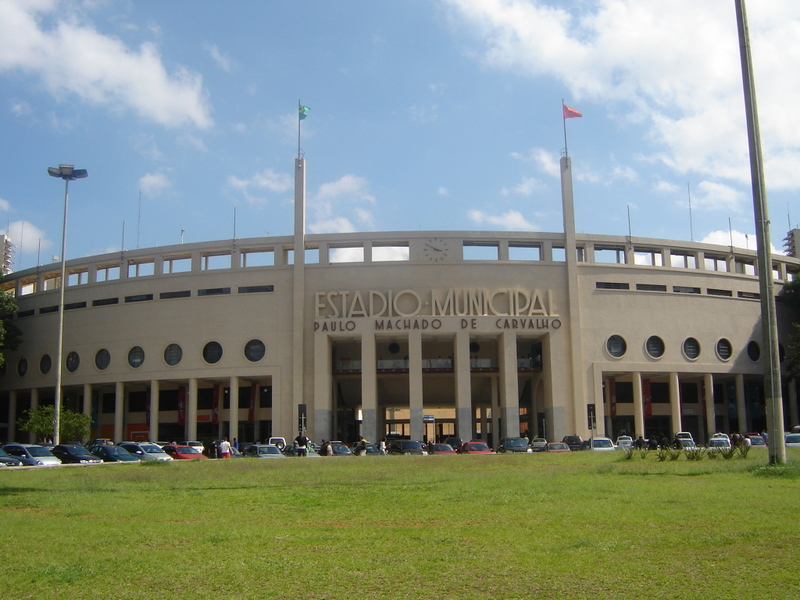
Estadio Centenario in Montevideo and Estádio do Pacaembu in São Paulo were the venues for the finals.

== Rules ==
The final will be played over two legs; home and away. The team that accumulates the most points —two for a win, one for a draw, zero for a loss— after the two legs will be crowned the champion. Should the two teams be tied on points after the second leg, the team with the best goal difference will win. If the two teams have equal goal difference, a playoff match at a neutral venue will be contested.

== Match details ==
=== First leg ===
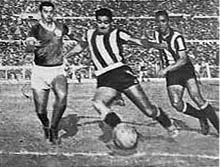
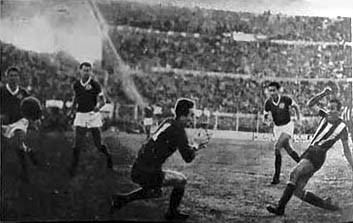
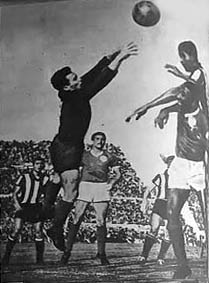
Some moments of the match held in Montevideo
1961 Copa Libertadores finals
June 4, 1961
First leg

Peñarol (Uruguay)	1–0	(Brazil) Palmeiras
Spencer 89'

Estadio Centenario, Montevideo
Attendance: 64,376
Referee: José Luis Praddaude (Argentina)

**Peñarol**	**Palmeiras**

GK	(Uruguay) Luis Maidana
DF	(Uruguay) William Martínez
DF	(Uruguay) Núber Cano
DF	(Uruguay) Edgardo González
DF	(Uruguay) Roberto Matosas
MF	(Uruguay) Walter Aguerre
MF	(Uruguay) Luis Cubilla
FW	(Uruguay) Ernesto Ledesma (c)
FW	(Ecuador) Alberto Spencer
FW	(Uruguay) José Sasía
FW	(Peru) Juan Joya
Manager:
(Uruguay) Roberto Scarone

GK	(Brazil) Valdir
DF	(Brazil) Djalma Santos (c)
DF	(Brazil) Valdemar Carabina
DF	(Brazil) Aldemar
DF	(Brazil) Geraldo Scotto
MF	(Brazil) Zequinha
FW	(Brazil) Julinho
FW	(Brazil) Chinesinho
FW	(Brazil) Humberto Tozzi	Substituted off
FW	(Brazil) Geraldo II
FW	(Brazil) José Romeiro
Substitutes:
FW	(Brazil) Nilton Santos	Substituted on
Manager:
(Argentina) Armando Renganeschi

=== Second leg ===
June 11, 1961
Second leg

Palmeiras (Brazil)	1–1	(Uruguay) Peñarol
Nardo 77'		Sasia 2'

Estádio do Pacaembu, São Paulo
Attendance: 50,000
Referee: José Luis Praddaude (Argentina)

**Palmeiras**	**Peñarol**

GK
DF
DF
DF
MF
MF
FW
FW
FW
FW
FW
Substitutes:
FW
Manager:
(Argentina) Armando Renganeschi

(Brazil) Valdir
(Brazil) Djalma Santos (c)
(Brazil) Valdemar
(Brazil) Aldemar
(Brazil) Zequinha
(Brazil) Geraldo Scotto
(Brazil) Julinho
(Brazil) Romeiro	Substituted off
(Brazil) Geraldo II
(Brazil) Chinesinho
(Brazil) Gildo
(Brazil) Nardo	Substituted on

GK	(Uruguay) Luis Maidana
DF	(Uruguay) William Martínez
DF	(Uruguay) Núber Cano
DF	(Uruguay) Edgardo González
DF	(Uruguay) Roberto Matosas
MF	(Uruguay) Walter Aguerre
MF	(Uruguay) Luis Cubilla
FW	(Uruguay) Ernesto Ledesma (c)
FW	(Ecuador) Alberto Spencer
FW	(Uruguay) José Sasía
FW	(Peru) Juan Joya
Manager:
(Uruguay) Roberto Scarone
