= 1962 Copa Libertadores finals =

1962 Copa de Campeones finals
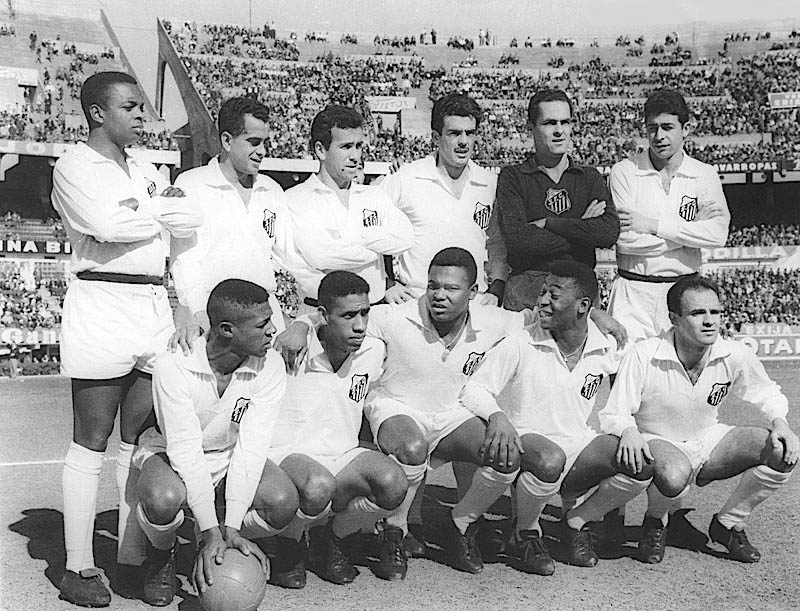
- Santos FC, champions
- Event: 1962 Copa de Campeones de América
Peñarol	Santos
(Uruguay)	(Brazil)
- 2–2 on points Santos won after a play-off

First leg
Peñarol	Santos
1	2
- Date: 28 July 1962
- Venue: Estadio Centenario, Montevideo
- Referee: Carlos Robles (Chile)
- Attendance: 48,105

Second leg
Santos	Peñarol
2	3
- Date: 2 August 1962
- Venue: Estadio Vila Belmiro, Santos
- Referee: Carlos Robles (Chile)
- Attendance: 18,000

Play-off
Santos	Peñarol
3	0
- Date: 30 August 1962
- Venue: Estadio Monumental, Buenos Aires
- Referee: Leo Horn (Netherlands)
- Attendance: 60,000

The 1962 Copa de Campeones final was the final series of the 1962 staging of South American football's premier club competition, the Copa de Campeones, better known today as the Copa Libertadores. The showpiece event was contested between defending champions Peñarol and Santos. Two-time winners Peñarol were appearing in their third consecutive final, while Santos aimed to win the competition for the first time. Ten teams entered the competition in its third season and, due to the rules in place at the time, Peñarol received a bye into the semifinals and reached the final having won only one match in the semifinal round.

In the semi-finals, Peñarol drew 2–2 on points with rivals Nacional after they each won a match. A playoff was contested in order to break the tie; the match ended in a draw and Peñarol went through due to their better total goal difference. Santos went past the first round easily, winning three of their matches and drawing once, while scoring an astonishing twenty goals and conceding six. The team contained players such as Coutinho, Pelé and Pepe, among others. In the semi-finals, the ballet blanco dispatched Universidad Católica to earn a slot in the finals. Santos would go on to dethrone Peñarol after winning the playoff 3–0 to win the coveted trophy and become the second champions of this prestigious event.

== Qualified teams ==
Team	Previous app.
(Uruguay) Peñarol	2 (**1960**, **1961**)
(Brazil) Santos	None

Notes

Bold indicates winning years

== Venues ==
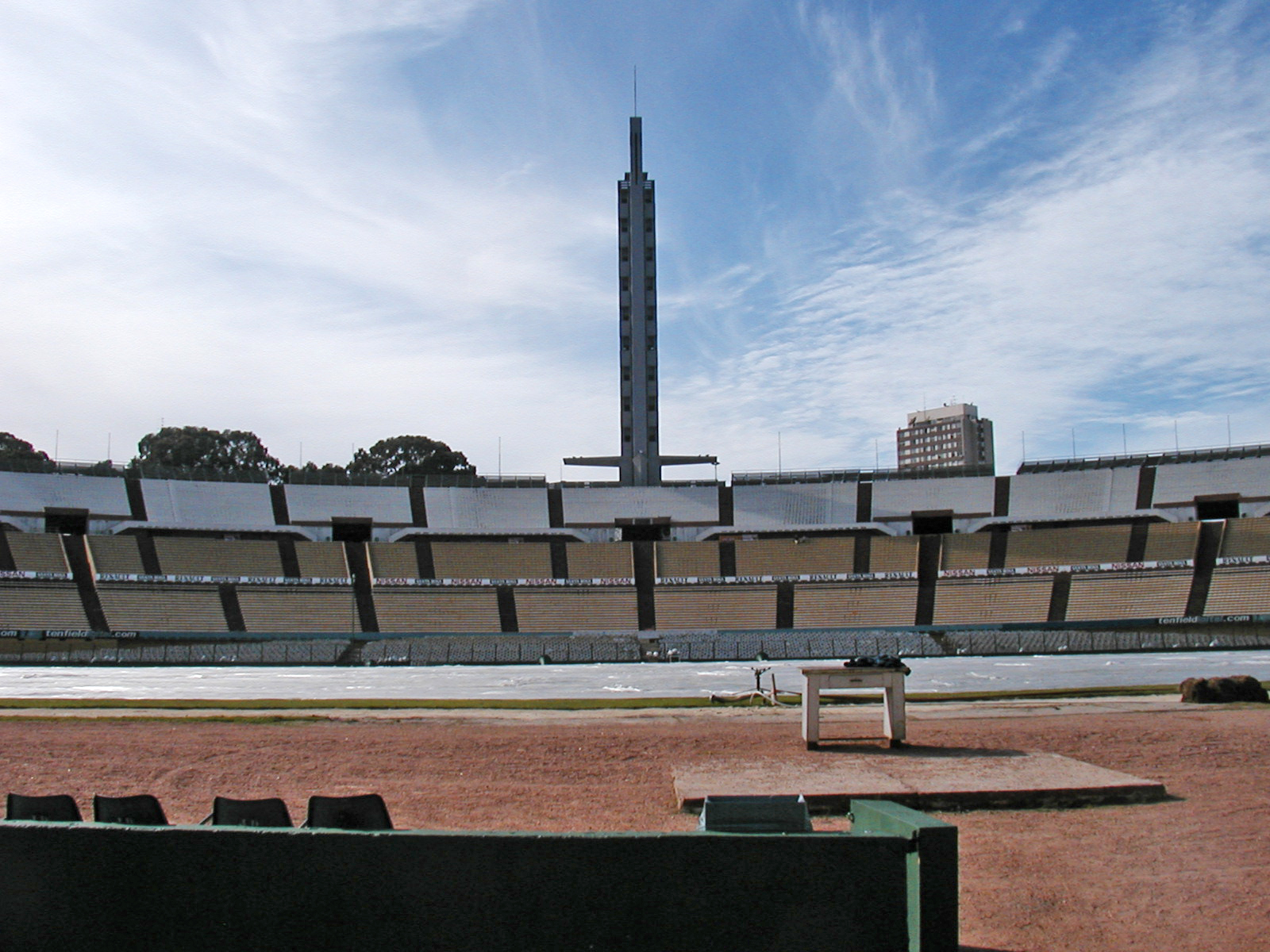
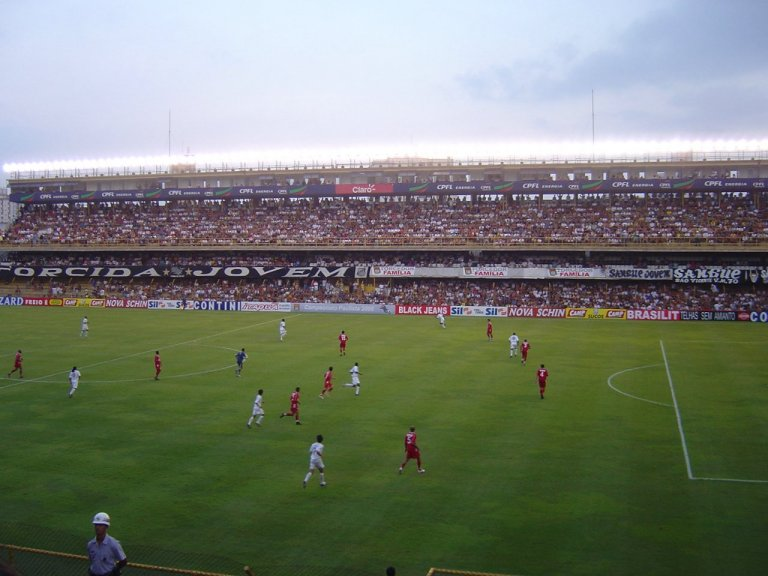
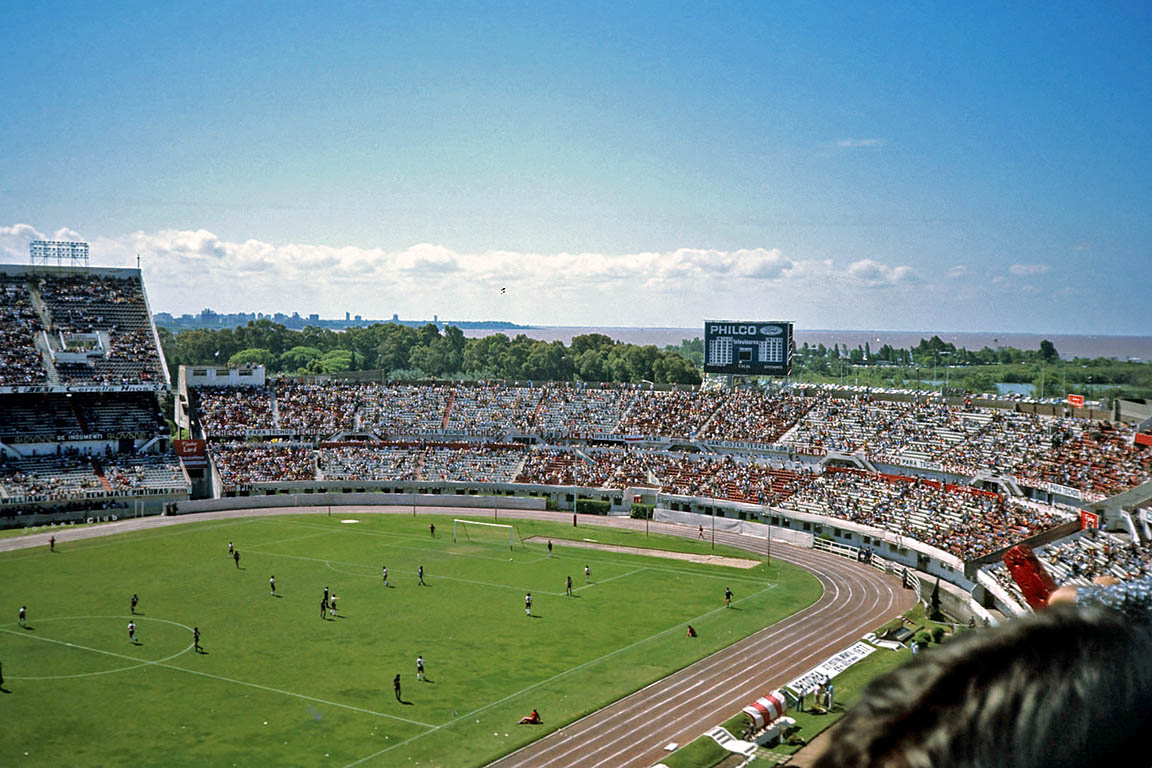
Estadio Centenario in Montevideo, Estadio Vila Belmiro in Santos and Estadio Monumental in Buenos Aires were the venues for the three matches (first and second leg plus playoff, respectively) of the finals.

== Rules ==
The finals were played over two legs; home and away. The team that accumulated the most points —two for a win, one for a draw, zero for a loss— after the two legs would be crowned champion. Unlike the previous two editions however, should the two teams be tied on points after the second leg a playoff was at a neutral venue would become the next tie-breaker. Goal difference was going to be used as a last resort.

== Matches ==
=== First leg ===
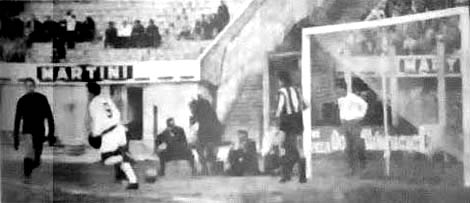
A moment of the first match in Montevideo

1962 Copa Libertadores finals
28 July 1962
First leg

Peñarol (Uruguay)	1–2	(Brazil) Santos
Spencer 18'		Coutinho 29', 70'

Estadio Centenario, Montevideo
Attendance: 48,105
Referee: Carlos Robles (Chile)

**Peñarol**	**Santos**

GK	(Uruguay) Luis Maidana
RB	(Paraguay) Juan Vicente Lezcano (c)
CB	(Uruguay) Núber Cano
LB	(Uruguay) Edgardo González
RH	(Uruguay) Roberto Matosas
LH	(Uruguay) Omar Caetano
OR	(Uruguay) Pedro Virgilio Rocha
IR	(Uruguay) José Sasía
CF	(Uruguay) Angel Cabrera
IL	(Ecuador) Alberto Spencer
OL	(Peru) Juan Joya
Manager:
(Hungary) Béla Guttman

GK	(Brazil) Gilmar
RB	(Brazil) Mauro
CB	(Brazil) Calvet
LB	(Brazil) Lima
RH	(Brazil) Zito
LH	(Brazil) Dalmo
OR	(Brazil) Dorval (c)
IR	(Brazil) Mengálvio
CF	(Brazil) Pagão
IL	(Brazil) Coutinho
OL	(Brazil) Pepe
Manager:
(Brazil) Lula

=== Second leg ===
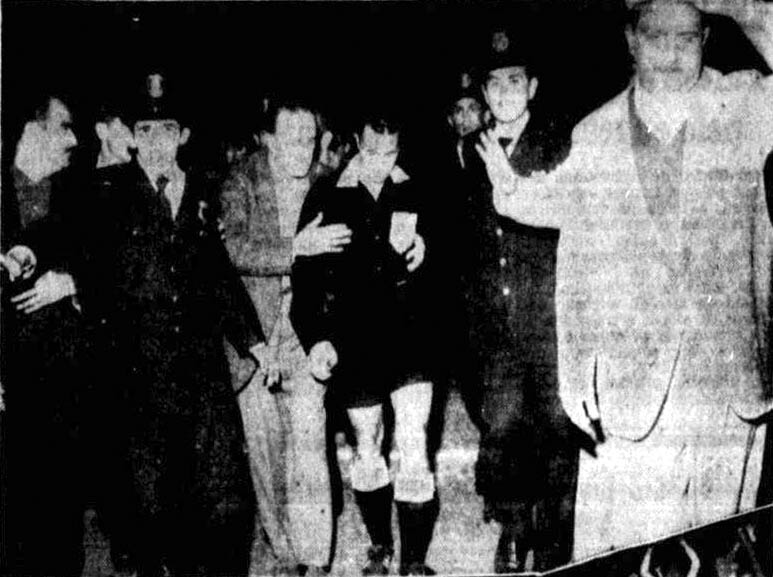
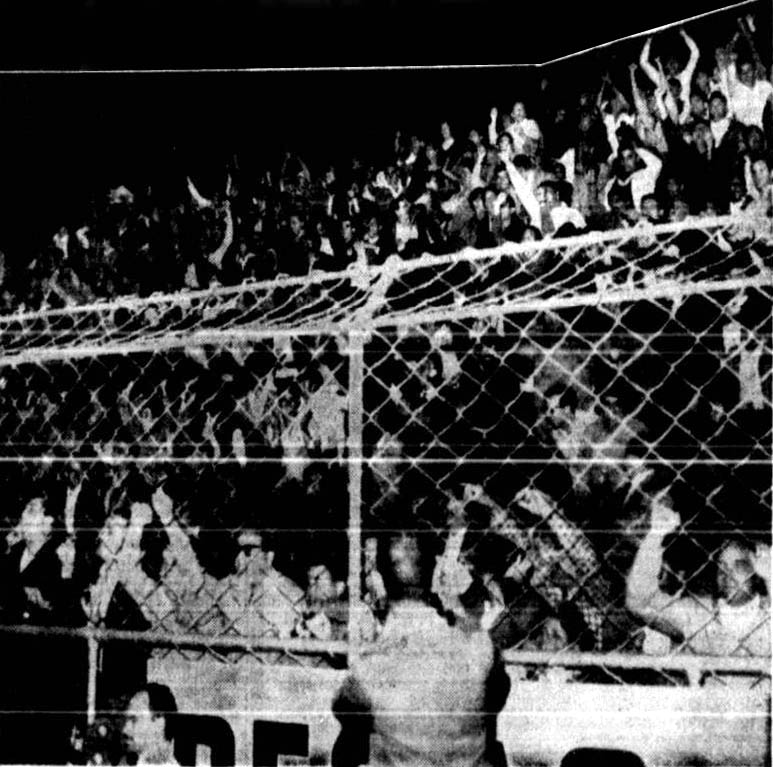
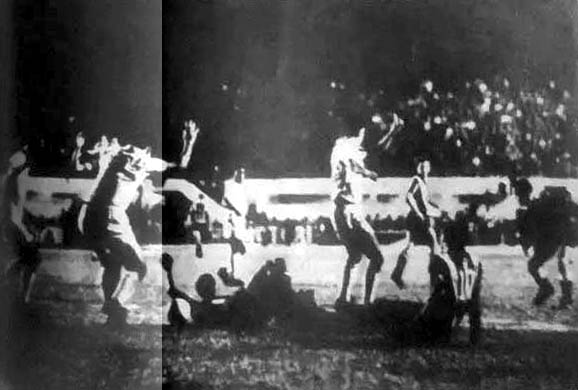
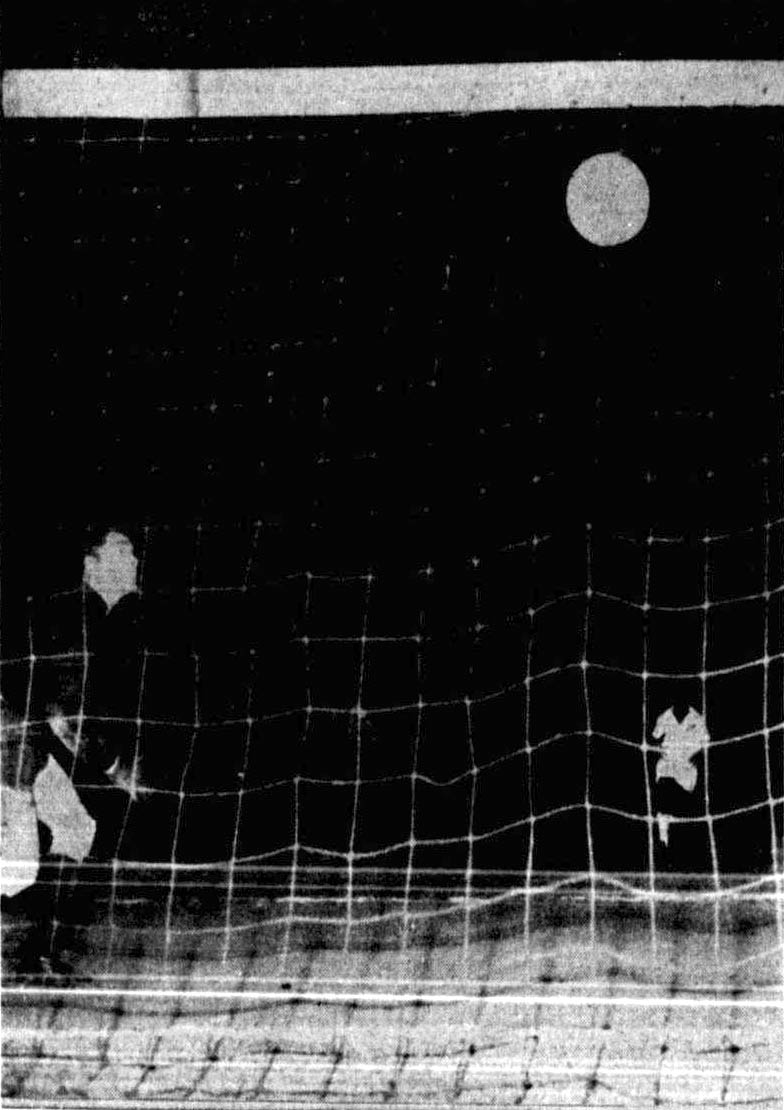
(Above): referee Carlos Robles (left photo) being aided by police officers during the second match of the finals, held in Santos; (right):the supporters during the time the match was interrupted.
Below: Game action

Despite winning 2–1 at half time in the second leg, Peñarol's Alberto Spencer scored an equalizer shortly after the break; in that goal, Santos goalkeeper Gilmar complained that Peñarol forward José Sasía had thrown dirt in his eyes. Two minutes later, Sasía himself scored Peñarol's third goal; several Santos players complained about a foul from Sasía on Calvet in that play, which led to confusion on the field and to supporters throwing bottles on the field; one of them hit Sasía, and another hit referee Carlos Robles, who became unconscious and stopped the match in the 51st minute. He reinstated the match more than an hour later.

After the match was reinstated, another bottle hit linesman Domingo Massaro, and he was sent to the stadium's ambulatory. After another period of suspension, Pagão scored Santos' equalizer to make it 3–3, and after the match was over, the club celebrated their Libertadores title, with Brazilian media outlets also declaring Santos as champions in the following day.

After the end of the match, Robles sent a report to CONMEBOL president Raúl Colombo describing the events of the match, stating that after his unconsciousness, he was driven to the locker room, where he was surrounded by several board members of both clubs and, without assurances of his safety to continue the match, he opted for its suspension, but only returned to referee the remaining minutes of the match to "preserve his life". Peñarol's manager Béla Guttmann left the stadium after the first suspension, after knowing that the referee had ended it.

In its ruling, CONMEBOL stated that only 51 minutes of the second leg were considered official. The remaining 39 minutes were part of "a friendly match". During that friendly time (the 65th minute), Pagão tied the match at three goals apiece, but the official score remained 2–3.

2 August 1962
Second leg

Santos (Brazil)	2–3 (Note: Only 51 minutes of the second leg was considered official by CONMEBOL. The remaining 39 minutes was a friendly match. In the friendly time (65th minute), Pagão tied the game at three goals a-piece, but the official score remained 2–3.)	(Uruguay) Peñarol
Dorval 17'; Mengálvio 35'		Spencer 14', 49'; Sasía 51'

Estadio Vila Belmiro, Santos
Attendance: 18,000
Referee: Carlos Robles (Chile)

**Santos**	**Peñarol**

GK	(Brazil) Gilmar
RB	(Brazil) Mauro
CB	(Brazil) Calvet
LB	(Brazil) Lima
RH	(Brazil) Zito
LH	(Brazil) Dalmo
OR	(Brazil) Dorval (c)
IR	(Brazil) Mengálvio
CF	(Brazil) Pagão
IL	(Brazil) Coutinho
OL	(Brazil) Pepe
Manager:
(Brazil) Lula

GK	(Uruguay) Luis Maidana
RB	(Paraguay) Juan Vicente Lezcano (c)
LB	(Uruguay) Núber Cano
RH	(Uruguay) Edgardo González
CH	(Uruguay) Roberto Matosas
LH	(Uruguay) Omar Caetano
OR	(Uruguay) Carlos Fernández
IR	(Uruguay) Pedro Virgilio Rocha
CF	(Uruguay) José Sasía
IL	(Ecuador) Alberto Spencer
OL	(Peru) Juan Joya
Manager:
(Hungary) Béla Guttman

=== Playoff ===
The third match was set to be played on 17 August, but was rescheduled to 30 August after Santos alleged fixture congestion due to matches of the 1962 Campeonato Paulista; in that match, CONMEBOL opted to line up Dutch referee Leo Horn. Pelé, who had been injured since the 1962 FIFA World Cup, was able to return for the third match, and scored twice to lead Santos to their first-ever continental title.

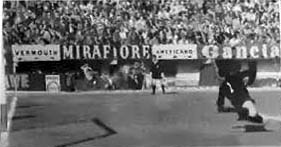
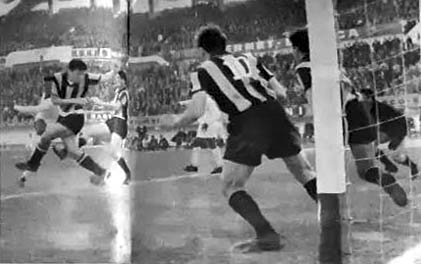
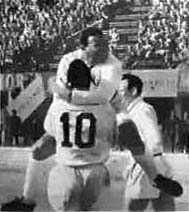
Some moments of the playoff held in Buenos Aires
30 August 1962
Playoff

Santos (Brazil)	3–0	(Uruguay) Peñarol
Caetano 11' (o.g.); Pelé 48', 89'

Estadio Monumental, Buenos Aires
Attendance: 60,000
Referee: Leo Horn (Netherlands)

**Santos**	**Peñarol**

GK	(Brazil) Gilmar
RB	(Brazil) Mauro
CB	(Brazil) Calvet
LB	(Brazil) Lima
RH	(Brazil) Zito
LH	(Brazil) Dalmo
OR	(Brazil) Dorval (c)
IR	(Brazil) Mengálvio
CF	(Brazil) Coutinho
IL	(Brazil) Pelé
OL	(Brazil) Pepe
Manager:
(Brazil) Lula

GK	(Uruguay) Luis Maidana
RB	(Paraguay) Juan Vicente Lezcano (c)
CB	(Uruguay) Núber Cano
CB	(Uruguay) Omar Caetano
LB	(Uruguay) Néstor Gonçalves
RH	(Uruguay) Edgardo González
LH	(Uruguay) Roberto Matosas
OR	(Uruguay) Pedro Virgilio Rocha
CF	(Ecuador) Alberto Spencer
CF	(Uruguay) José Sasía
OL	(Peru) Juan Joya
Manager:
(Hungary) Béla Guttman
