= 1962 Campeonato Paulista =

Campeonato Paulista – Série A1
- Season: 1962
- Champions: Santos
- Relegated: Taubaté
- Taça Brasil: Santos
- Matches played: 240
- Goals scored: 820 (3.42 per match)
- Best Player: Pelé (Santos)
- Top goalscorer: Pelé (Santos) – 37 goals
- Biggest home win: Botafogo 7-0 Esportiva de Guaratinguetá (September 16, 1962)
- Biggest away win: Juventus 0-7 Guarani (August 18, 1962)
- Highest scoring: Santos 8-2 Jabaquara (December 2, 1962)

The 1962 Campeonato Paulista da Divisão Especial, organized by the Federação Paulista de Futebol, was the 61st season of São Paulo's top professional football league. Santos won the title for the 7th time. Taubaté was relegated. Unsurprisingly, and for the sixth consecutive year, the top scorer was Santos's Pelé, with 37 goals.

== Championship ==
The championship was disputed in a double-round robin system, with the team with the most points winning the title and the team with the fewest points being relegated.

Pos	Team	Pld	W	D	L	GF	GA	GD	Pts	Qualification or relegation
1	Santos	30	24	5	1	105	28	+77	53	Champions
2	Corinthians	30	18	7	5	77	37	+40	43	
3	São Paulo	30	18	5	7	63	39	+24	41	
4	Palmeiras	30	14	6	10	67	28	+39	34	
5	Portuguesa	30	12	9	9	42	43	−1	33	
6	Botafogo	30	14	4	12	65	52	+13	32	
7	Ferroviária	30	13	6	11	51	44	+7	32	
8	Guarani	30	11	7	12	50	45	+5	29	
9	Comercial	30	11	5	14	42	51	−9	27	
10	Noroeste	30	9	7	14	51	57	−6	25	
11	Juventus	30	8	9	13	30	44	−14	25	
12	Esportiva de Guaratinguetá	30	9	7	14	30	48	−18	25	
13	XV de Piracicaba	30	9	6	15	38	63	−25	24	
14	Prudentina	30	9	5	16	38	65	−27	23	
15	Jabaquara	30	8	5	17	44	72	−28	21	
16	Taubaté	30	4	5	21	27	73	−46	13	Relegated

Updated to match(es) played on December 16, 1962. Source: RSSSF.com
Rules for classification: 1) points; 2) goal difference; 3) wins; 4) number of goals scored.

== Top Scores ==
Rank	Player	Club	Goals
1	Pelé	Santos	37
2	Coutinho	Santos	32
3	Silva Batuta	Corinthians	28
4	Ney Oliveira	Corinthians	17
4	Toninho Guerreiro	Noroeste	17
6	Alencar	Palmeiras	16
7	Sílvio	Portuguesa	15
7	Paulo Leão	Guaraní	15
9	Benê	São Paulo	14
9	Oswaldo	Guaraní	14
