= 1966 Campeonato Profesional =

Campeonato Profesional
- Season: 1966
- Champions: Santa Fe (4th title)
- Copa Libertadores: Santa Fe; Independiente Medellín
- Matches: 364
- Goals: 1,188 (3.26 per match)
- Top goalscorer: Omar Devani (31 goals)
- Biggest home win: Junior 7–1 Deportes Quindío; Independiente Medellín 7–1 Atlético Bucaramanga
- Biggest away win: América de Cali 0–4 Junior
- Highest scoring: Once Caldas 7–3 Unión Magdalena

The 1966 Campeonato Profesional was the 19th season of Colombia's top-flight football league. 14 teams competed against one another. Santa Fe won their fourth league title.

== Background and league system ==
14 teams competed in the tournament: the same 13 teams from the previous tournament as well as Junior, who returned to the competition after a 13-year absence with the bulk of the team that made up the Colombia national football team during the qualification tournament for the 1966 FIFA World Cup.

The tournament was once again played under a round-robin format, with every team playing each other four times (twice at home and twice away) for a total of 52 matches. Teams received two points for a win and one point for a draw. If two or more teams were tied on points, places were determined by goal difference. The team with the most points became the champion of the league. 364 matches were played during the season, with a total of 1188 goals scored.

Santa Fe won the championship for the fourth time, the runners-up were Independiente Medellín. Both teams qualified for the 1967 Copa Libertadores, marking the return of Colombian clubs to the competition after FIFA lifted the two-year suspension on the Colombian Football Federation due to the conflict between the FIFA-recognized Asociación de Fútbol Colombiano (Adefútbol) and DIMAYOR. Argentine player Omar Devani, who played for Santa Fe, was the season's top goalscorer with 31 goals.

== Teams ==
Team	City	Stadium
América de Cali	Cali	Estadio Olímpico Pascual Guerrero
Atlético Bucaramanga	Bucaramanga	Estadio Alfonso López
Atlético Nacional	Medellín	Estadio Atanasio Girardot
Cúcuta Deportivo	Cúcuta	Estadio General Santander
Deportes Quindío	Armenia	Estadio San José de Armenia
Deportes Tolima	Ibagué	Estadio Serrano de Ávila
Deportivo Cali	Cali	Estadio Olímpico Pascual Guerrero
Deportivo Pereira	Pereira	Estadio Alberto Mora Mora
Independiente Medellín	Medellín	Estadio Atanasio Girardot
Junior	Barranquilla	Estadio Romelio Martínez
Millonarios	Bogotá	Estadio El Campín
Once Caldas	Manizales	Estadio Fernando Londoño Londoño
Santa Fe	Bogotá	Estadio El Campín
Unión Magdalena	Santa Marta	Estadio Eduardo Santos

== Standings ==
Pos	Team	Pld	W	D	L	GF	GA	GD	Pts	Qualification or relegation
1	Santa Fe (C)	52	25	16	11	102	76	+26	66	1967 Copa Libertadores
2	Independiente Medellín	52	25	13	14	106	73	+33	63	1967 Copa Libertadores
3	Deportivo Pereira	52	24	13	15	91	83	+8	61	
4	Once Caldas	52	24	11	17	101	83	+18	59	
5	Millonarios	52	23	12	17	98	88	+10	58	
6	Deportivo Cali	52	20	15	17	83	76	+7	55	
7	Cúcuta Deportivo	52	19	16	17	77	72	+5	54	
8	Junior	52	21	11	20	94	88	+6	53	
9	Unión Magdalena	52	21	10	21	76	80	−4	52	
10	América de Cali	52	16	16	20	60	69	−9	48	
11	Atlético Bucaramanga	52	13	16	23	71	89	−18	42	
12	Atlético Nacional	52	15	11	26	81	103	−22	41	
13	Deportes Tolima	52	15	11	26	74	98	−24	41	
14	Deportes Quindío	52	12	11	29	74	110	−36	35	

Source: RSSSF
(C) Champions

== Results ==
=== Matchdays 1-26 ===
_{Home}\^{Away}	AME	BUC	CAL	CUC	JUN	MAG	DIM	MIL	NAC	ONC	PER	QUI	SFE	TOL
América	—	1–1	1–1	3–1	1–0	1–0	1–1	1–2	0–0	1–3	0–2	2–2	3–3	3–0
Bucaramanga	1–2	—	0–2	1–1	3–1	1–2	2–3	1–2	2–1	1–1	3–2	0–2	0–0	3–1
Cali	2–2	3–1	—	3–3	3–1	1–2	0–0	4–1	2–1	1–0	3–1	1–0	1–2	3–1
Cúcuta	1–1	1–0	4–2	—	2–2	1–1	3–0	2–2	1–1	1–0	2–1	2–0	1–0	0–2
Junior	2–0	4–3	3–0	1–3	—	0–0	1–2	2–2	0–0	1–0	1–1	1–0	4–3	4–1
Magdalena	2–0	2–0	0–1	0–0	1–2	—	0–0	1–0	3–1	4–2	5–3	2–1	2–2	1–0
Medellín	0–2	7–1	2–0	3–1	3–3	1–0	—	1–2	3–1	0–0	3–1	1–0	2–2	5–2
Millonarios	2–0	3–4	3–0	2–1	1–1	6–1	1–2	—	3–2	2–2	1–1	4–2	0–1	2–1
Nacional	2–1	4–2	2–1	2–2	3–4	1–0	2–1	2–5	—	5–0	2–3	1–3	0–1	0–3
Caldas	0–1	2–2	2–2	3–2	4–3	2–1	2–1	4–2	2–1	—	3–3	4–0	0–1	1–0
Pereira	0–0	3–2	2–0	1–0	1–1	2–1	1–1	2–0	5–1	1–2	—	1–0	1–0	4–4
Quindío	0–2	2–2	3–3	2–1	0–1	2–2	1–4	1–2	2–1	4–5	1–0	—	0–3	1–0
Santa Fe	3–1	3–0	1–3	2–2	3–1	3–2	3–1	1–2	3–1	1–2	4–1	3–4	—	4–1
Tolima	1–1	3–1	1–0	3–1	0–0	3–2	2–2	1–1	1–1	2–0	0–1	2–3	2–1	—

=== Matchdays 27-52 ===
_{Home}\^{Away}	AME	BUC	CAL	CUC	JUN	MAG	DIM	MIL	NAC	ONC	PER	QUI	SFE	TOL
América	—	2–1	0–0	1–0	0–4	1–2	1–2	2–1	3–0	2–0	0–2	0–3	0–0	3–1
Bucaramanga	3–1	—	2–3	4–0	3–2	1–0	0–0	0–2	1–0	1–1	2–0	0–0	1–2	3–0
Cali	0–0	1–1	—	1–1	3–0	0–0	5–2	2–2	1–2	2–1	1–1	3–1	1–1	2–0
Cúcuta	2–1	3–2	2–0	—	3–1	4–1	2–0	0–1	0–0	1–2	3–3	5–1	2–0	0–0
Junior	4–2	2–0	0–2	1–0	—	1–0	3–1	2–0	1–3	1–2	2–2	7–1	0–0	3–2
Magdalena	2–1	0–1	4–2	3–0	2–1	—	2–1	1–1	0–2	0–2	3–1	3–1	3–1	1–2
Medellín	1–1	2–2	3–2	3–0	1–0	1–1	—	6–0	3–1	2–0	5–1	5–2	2–3	5–1
Millonarios	0–1	0–0	3–2	0–1	3–2	0–1	2–1	—	6–1	4–3	2–1	5–3	1–3	2–0
Nacional	1–1	1–1	1–1	0–2	2–3	7–2	0–2	3–2	—	3–2	4–1	2–0	1–1	4–2
Caldas	0–1	2–2	2–1	2–0	4–1	7–3	3–0	5–2	5–1	—	2–1	2–2	2–2	1–1
Pereira	2–1	3–0	3–1	2–2	3–2	2–1	2–1	1–0	2–1	0–1	—	3–2	2–2	2–1
Quindío	2–1	1–1	0–1	1–2	4–2	1–1	0–1	3–3	2–2	1–0	1–2	—	2–2	1–2
Santa Fe	2–1	1–0	1–3	3–3	4–2	2–1	4–4	2–2	2–0	3–2	2–2	2–1	—	3–1
Tolima	2–2	2–2	4–1	1–0	1–3	1–2	1–3	1–1	4–1	3–2	1–3	3–2	0–1	—

== Top goalscorers ==
Rank	Name	Club	Goals
1	(Argentina) Omar Devani	Santa Fe	31
2	(Argentina) Osvaldo Pérez	Once Caldas	29
3	(Uruguay) Walter Sosa	Cúcuta Deportivo	28
4	(Colombia) Antonio Rada	Junior	27
5	(Uruguay) José Omar Verdún	Cúcuta Deportivo	21
5	(Brazil) Wagner Rodríguez	Unión Magdalena	21
5	(Colombia) Delio Gamboa	Santa Fe	21
8	(Brazil) Dida	Junior	20
8	(Colombia) Hermán Aceros	Independiente Medellín	20
8	(Brazil) Eduardo Lima	Millonarios	20

Source: RSSSF.com Colombia 1966
