= 1964 Campeonato Profesional =

Campeonato Profesional
- Season: 1964
- Champions: Millonarios (9th title)
- Matches: 312
- Goals: 1,002 (3.21 per match)
- Top goalscorer: Omar Devani (28 goals)
- Biggest home win: Santa Fe 6–0 Atlético Bucaramanga; Atlético Nacional 7–1 Atlético Bucaramanga
- Biggest away win: Unión Magdalena 1–4 Independiente Medellín; Santa Fe 0–3 Deportivo Pereira; Santa Fe 1–4 Deportes Tolima
- Highest scoring: Atlético Nacional 4–6 Millonarios; América de Cali 7–3 Unión Magdalena

The 1964 Campeonato Profesional was the 17th season of Colombia's top-flight football league. 13 teams competed against one another. Millonarios won the league for the ninth time in its history and fourth in a row, defending successfully the title won in the previous three seasons.

== Background and league system ==
The same 13 teams from the last tournament competed in this one. The tournament was once again played under a round-robin format, with every team playing each other four times (twice at home and twice away) for a total of 48 matches. Teams received two points for a win and one point for a draw. If two or more teams were tied on points, places were determined by goal difference. The team with the most points became the champion of the league. Millonarios won the championship for the ninth time. The runners-up were Cúcuta Deportivo.

== Teams ==
Locations of the 1964 Campeonato Profesional teams:
- 1. Armenia
- 2. Bogotá
- 3. Bucaramanga
- 4. Cali
- 5. Cúcuta
- 6. Ibagué
- 7. Manizales
- 8. Medellín
- 9. Pereira
- 10. Santa Marta

Team	City	Stadium
América de Cali	Cali	Estadio Olímpico Pascual Guerrero
Atlético Bucaramanga	Bucaramanga	Estadio Alfonso López
Atlético Nacional	Medellín	Estadio Atanasio Girardot
Cúcuta Deportivo	Cúcuta	Estadio General Santander
Deportes Quindío	Armenia	Estadio San José de Armenia
Deportes Tolima	Ibagué	Estadio 10 de Mayo
Deportivo Cali	Cali	Estadio Olímpico Pascual Guerrero
Deportivo Pereira	Pereira	Estadio Alberto Mora Mora
Independiente Medellín	Medellín	Estadio Atanasio Girardot
Millonarios	Bogotá	Estadio El Campín
Once Caldas	Manizales	Estadio Fernando Londoño Londoño
Santa Fe	Bogotá	Estadio El Campín
Unión Magdalena	Santa Marta	Estadio Eduardo Santos

== Final standings ==
Pos	Team	Pld	W	D	L	GF	GA	GD	Pts
1	Millonarios (Note: Millonarios did not enter the 1965 Copa Libertadores due to a conflict between the FIFA-recognized Asociación de Fútbol Colombiano (Adefútbol) and DIMAYOR which derived into the suspension of the Colombian Football Federation by FIFA.) (C)	48	21	15	12	87	72	+15	57
2	Cúcuta Deportivo	48	19	18	11	79	57	+22	56
3	Independiente Medellín	48	19	16	13	85	73	+12	54
4	Deportes Quindío	48	18	16	14	81	68	+13	52
5	Deportivo Cali	48	15	21	12	83	71	+12	51
6	Deportivo Pereira	48	15	18	15	74	67	+7	48
7	Santa Fe	48	17	14	17	89	85	+4	48
8	América de Cali	48	15	18	15	71	70	+1	48
9	Atlético Nacional	48	17	13	18	85	82	+3	47
10	Unión Magdalena	48	16	12	20	78	93	−15	44
11	Deportes Tolima	48	12	17	19	63	84	−21	41
12	Once Caldas	48	13	14	21	64	94	−30	40
13	Atlético Bucaramanga	48	11	16	21	63	86	−23	38

Source: RSSSF
(C) Champions

== Results ==
=== First turn ===
Home \ Away	AME	BUC	CAL	CUC	DIM	MAG	MIL	NAC	ONC	PER	QUI	SFE	TOL
América de Cali		0–0	2–0	1–1	2–2	1–3	0–1	0–1	3–0	3–1	0–1	4–1	1–2
Atlético Bucaramanga	0–0		0–0	0–0	1–1	1–0	1–0	2–0	2–0	1–1	1–3	0–1	4–1
Deportivo Cali	1–1	1–1		3–1	1–1	4–0	3–2	3–0	1–2	4–4	1–1	2–1	2–2
Cúcuta Deportivo	1–0	3–1	2–2		1–1	5–0	1–0	4–2	3–0	0–0	2–2	2–2	3–0
Independiente Medellín	2–0	2–2	2–0	0–0		5–2	6–1	3–1	2–0	2–2	2–1	2–2	4–2
Unión Magdalena	4–0	3–2	2–2	3–1	1–0		0–0	1–1	3–1	1–0	1–1	2–3	4–2
Millonarios	4–1	5–0	1–0	0–0	1–0	2–2		4–3	1–1	2–0	0–0	3–1	5–3
Atlético Nacional	2–2	4–1	2–2	3–0	2–0	2–0	4–6		1–2	1–1	1–2	2–3	2–0
Once Caldas	0–1	2–1	1–2	3–3	0–1	5–3	2–1	3–0		1–1	3–2	5–4	0–0
Deportivo Pereira	2–0	2–1	1–1	2–0	1–0	0–0	1–1	1–3	5–1		3–2	2–2	1–1
Deportes Quindío	2–0	2–0	3–2	1–1	1–1	0–0	1–2	4–3	5–0	4–1		0–1	0–1
Santa Fe	1–2	6–0	1–0	2–2	3–0	1–0	3–2	6–3	0–1	4–4	0–1		1–0
Deportes Tolima	1–2	2–1	1–0	0–0	3–1	1–1	1–2	2–2	1–1	3–0	1–1	1–1	

Legend: Blue = home team win; Yellow = draw; Red = away team win.

=== Second turn ===
Home \ Away	AME	BUC	CAL	CUC	DIM	MAG	MIL	NAC	ONC	PER	QUI	SFE	TOL
América de Cali		2–0	0–2	4–3	0–0	7–3	1–1	0–1	2–3	1–0	1–2	2–2	4–2
Atlético Bucaramanga	3–3		2–0	2–2	4–4	3–0	2–1	1–1	1–1	1–2	1–1	3–1	4–0
Deportivo Cali	1–1	2–2		0–1	2–3	4–2	0–0	1–1	4–2	4–1	4–2	2–0	0–0
Cúcuta Deportivo	1–2	0–0	4–1		3–0	1–0	4–1	2–0	3–0	1–0	2–1	2–1	1–3
Independiente Medellín	0–1	3–2	0–0	4–2		1–2	1–1	2–0	3–1	3–2	0–0	2–0	3–2
Unión Magdalena	2–2	1–2	3–4	0–2	1–4		2–2	2–0	5–3	0–2	3–2	1–1	5–0
Millonarios	1–1	2–0	3–3	1–1	5–3	0–0		1–3	4–2	1–0	3–1	2–1	2–2
Atlético Nacional	3–3	7–1	2–1	0–2	2–0	2–4	4–1		2–0	3–1	2–2	2–1	1–1
Once Caldas	1–1	3–1	1–2	1–1	2–2	0–1	1–3	2–2		1–1	1–0	2–2	1–1
Deportivo Pereira	1–1	4–2	0–2	3–3	1–1	3–0	2–0	0–1	4–0		0–0	1–1	3–0
Deportes Quindío	1–1	3–1	3–3	2–1	5–2	2–1	2–4	1–0	2–0	2–1		3–3	1–1
Santa Fe	3–3	2–1	2–2	1–0	3–4	5–1	2–0	1–1	0–1	0–3	3–2		1–4
Deportes Tolima	1–2	2–1	2–2	2–1	2–0	1–3	0–2	0–0	1–1	1–3	3–1	1–3	

Legend: Blue = home team win; Yellow = draw; Red = away team win.

== Top goalscorers ==
Rank	Name	Club	Goals
1	(Argentina) Omar Devani	Atlético Bucaramanga / Unión Magdalena	28
2	(Brazil) José Marin	Santa Fe	27
3	(Uruguay) José Omar Verdún	Cúcuta Deportivo	24
3	(Argentina) Edgardo López	Deportes Tolima	24
5	(Argentina) Perfecto Rodríguez	Independiente Medellín	22
5	(Brazil) Sílvio Faria	Millonarios	22
7	(Colombia) Harvey Colonia	América de Cali	21
7	(Argentina) José Américo Montanini	Atlético Bucaramanga	21
9	(Argentina) Juan Eulogio Urriolabeitía	Atlético Nacional	19
9	(Colombia) Efraín Padilla	Deportivo Pereira	19

Source: RSSSF.com Colombia 1964
