= 1960 Campeonato Profesional =

Campeonato Profesional
- Season: 1960
- Champions: Santa Fe (3rd title)
- Matches: 262
- Goals: 815 (3.11 per match)
- Top goalscorer: Walter Marcolini (30)
- Biggest home win: Atlético Bucaramanga 6–0 Cúcuta Deportivo
- Biggest away win: Cúcuta Deportivo 1–5 Atlético Bucaramanga; Deportivo Cali 1–5 Independiente Medellín; Deportivo Pereira 1–5 Deportes Tolima; Atlético Quindío 0–4 Independiente Medellín
- Highest scoring: Santa Fe 6–3 Deportes Tolima; Unión Magdalena 5–4 Atlético Quindío; Santa Fe 4–5 Deportes Tolima

The 1960 Campeonato Profesional was the 13th season of Colombia's top-flight football league. 12 teams competed against one another and played each weekend. Santa Fe won the league for the 3rd time in its history after getting 61 points. Millonarios, the defending champion, was 6th with 45 points.

== Background ==
The same 12 teams from the last tournament competed in this one. Santa Fe won the championship for the third time.

== League system ==
Every team played four games against each other team, two at home and two away. Teams received two points for a win and one point for a draw. If two or more teams were tied on points, places were determined by goal difference. The team with the most points is the champion of the league.

== Teams ==
Locations of the 1960 Campeonato Profesional teams:
- 1. Armenia
- 2. Bogotá
- 3. Bucaramanga
- 4. Cali
- 5. Cúcuta
- 6. Ibagué
- 7. Medellín
- 8. Pereira
- 9. Santa Marta

Team	City	Stadium
América	Cali	Estadio Olímpico Pascual Guerrero
Atlético Bucaramanga	Bucaramanga	Estadio Alfonso López
Atlético Nacional	Medellín	Estadio Atanasio Girardot
Atlético Quindío	Armenia	Estadio San José de Armenia
Cúcuta Deportivo	Cúcuta	Estadio General Santander
Deportes Tolima	Ibagué	Estadio 10 de Mayo
Deportivo Cali	Cali	Estadio Olímpico Pascual Guerrero
Deportivo Pereira	Pereira	Estadio Alberto Mora Mora
Independiente Medellín	Medellín	Estadio Atanasio Girardot
Millonarios	Bogotá	Estadio El Campín
Santa Fe	Bogotá	Estadio El Campín
Unión Magdalena	Santa Marta	Estadio Eduardo Santos

== Final standings ==
Pos	Team	Pld	W	D	L	GF	GA	GD	Pts	Qualification
1	Santa Fe (C)	44	22	17	5	95	64	+31	61	1961 Copa Libertadores First Round
2	América	44	21	13	10	62	42	+20	55	
3	Atlético Bucaramanga	44	20	14	10	74	53	+21	54	
4	Deportivo Cali	44	20	9	15	76	71	+5	49	
5	Independiente Medellín	44	18	12	14	64	51	+13	48	
6	Millonarios	44	16	13	15	69	57	+12	45	
7	Deportes Tolima	44	16	13	15	82	85	−3	45	
8	Atlético Quindío	44	14	15	15	64	71	−7	43	
9	Atlético Nacional	44	15	7	22	66	72	−6	37	
10	Unión Magdalena	44	10	12	22	57	83	−26	32	
11	Cúcuta Deportivo	44	11	8	25	49	83	−34	30	
12	Deportivo Pereira	44	8	13	23	57	83	−26	29	

Source: RSSSF
(C) Champions

=== Results ===
==== First turn ====
Home \ Away	AME	BUC	CAL	CUC	MAG	MED	MIL	NAC	PER	QUI	SFE	TOL
América		1–1	2–1	0–1	2–0	3–2	3–1	2–0	1–0	0–0	4–2	5–2
Atlético Bucaramanga	2–1		0–0	6–0	4–0	4–2	1–0	1–2	2–4	1–0	1–2	1–1
Deportivo Cali	1–3	6–2		2–0	3–0	1–5	3–2	0–3	3–0	4–3	1–1	0–3
Cúcuta Deportivo	2–2	1–5	1–4		1–1	0–1	1–2	1–1	2–0	2–0	0–1	1–0
Unión Magdalena	2–1	0–0	1–3	3–1		1–1	2–2	0–1	4–1	5–2	1–1	2–2
Independiente Medellín	0–0	0–1	0–1	2–1	2–2		2–1	0–1	1–0	2–0	3–1	1–2
Millonarios	2–0	1–0	2–2	6–1	4–1	1–0		2–1	1–2	1–2	2–2	1–2
Atlético Nacional	2–3	0–1	3–1	3–2	1–1	0–3	1–2		5–2	1–2	0–0	2–5
Deportivo Pereira	0–1	3–4	1–2	2–0	3–2	1–1	2–0	1–1		2–2	2–5	1–5
Atlético Quindío	2–1	0–2	2–2	2–1	3–1	3–3	2–1	2–1	2–2		3–3	3–0
Santa Fe	1–2	3–0	3–1	4–2	1–0	1–0	1–1	1–0	1–0	2–2		6–3
Deportes Tolima	2–2	1–2	3–2	1–2	1–2	2–0	1–0	3–2	1–1	1–1	1–3	

Legend: Blue = home team win; Yellow = draw; Red = away team win.

==== Second turn ====
Home \ Away	AME	BUC	CAL	CUC	MAG	MED	MIL	NAC	PER	QUI	SFE	TOL
América		1–1	0–1	0–1	1–0	1–0	0–0	0–0	1–0	1–0	1–1	4–1
Atlético Bucaramanga	1–1		3–0	3–1	2–0	2–0	1–1	2–0	3–1	1–1	1–1	3–3
Deportivo Cali	1–0	1–0		1–2	2–1	1–1	1–0	4–1	1–1	1–2	2–2	2–1
Cúcuta Deportivo	0–1	1–0	1–1		2–0	0–1	0–1	2–1	1–0	1–1	2–2	0–1
Unión Magdalena	3–4	1–1	0–2	4–3		0–0	0–1	1–2	0–1	5–4	4–2	0–0
Independiente Medellín	2–1	2–0	4–3	1–0	1–0		1–1	1–2	2–0	2–0	2–2	3–2
Millonarios	0–0	0–0	2–2	4–1	1–3	0–0		4–2	3–1	3–1	2–2	3–3
Atlético Nacional	2–1	1–2	3–1	4–3	5–1	0–2	0–0		1–2	0–1	2–3	2–3
Deportivo Pereira	1–1	1–1	1–2	3–1	4–0	2–2	1–3	0–1		2–2	4–4	1–1
Atlético Quindío	1–2	2–2	2–0	2–0	0–1	0–4	2–1	2–1	1–1		0–2	1–1
Santa Fe	0–0	5–1	2–2	1–0	3–1	2–0	3–2	2–2	2–0	1–0		4–5
Deportes Tolima	0–2	1–3	2–1	3–3	3–1	4–2	0–2	0–3	3–1	1–1	2–4	

Legend: Blue = home team win; Yellow = draw; Red = away team win.

=== Top goalscorers ===
Rank	Name	Club	Goals
1	(Argentina) Walter Marcolini	Deportivo Cali	30
2	(Argentina) Osvaldo Panzutto	Santa Fe	26
3	(Argentina) Américo Castroman	Deportivo Cali	25
4	(Argentina) José Giarrizzo	Atlético Bucaramanga	24
5	(Argentina) Onofre Benítez	Atlético Quindío	23
6	(Argentina) / (Colombia) José Américo Montanini	Atlético Bucaramanga	22
7	(Colombia) Carlos Arango	Unión Magdalena	20
7	(Colombia) Eusebio Escobar	Deportivo Pereira	20
9	(Argentina) Alberto Perazzo	Santa Fe	19
10	(Argentina) Juan Manuel López	América	17

Source: RSSSF.com Colombia 1960
