= 1955 Campeonato Carioca =

Campeonato Carioca
- Season: 1955
- Champions: Flamengo
- Matches played: 150
- Goals scored: 560 (3.73 per match)
- Top goalscorer: Paulinho (Flamengo) – 23 goals
- Biggest home win: Vasco da Gama 8-0 Madureira (November 6, 1955)
- Biggest away win: São Cristóvão 0-5 Bangu (August 14, 1955); Olaria 0-5 Flamengo (September 25, 1955); Bangu 1-6 América (February 6, 1956)
- Highest scoring: Bangu 8-1 Madureira (December 18, 1955)

The 1955 edition of the Campeonato Carioca kicked off on August 7, 1955 and ended on April 4, 1956. It was organized by FMF (Federação Metropolitana de Futebol, or Metropolitan Football Federation). Twelve teams participated. Flamengo won the title for the 13th time. no teams were relegated.

== System ==
The tournament would be divided in two stages:

- First phase: The twelve teams all played against each other in a double round-robin format. The six best teams qualified to the Third round (The first and second rounds were part of the First phase). The team with the most points qualified to the Finals.
- Third round: The remaining six teams all played in a single round-robin format against each other. The team with the most points qualified to the Finals.
- Finals: The finals would be disputed in a best-of-three-points series. In case the same team won all three rounds, it won the title automatically.

== Championship ==
=== First phase ===
Pos	Team	Pld	W	D	L	GF	GA	GD	Pts	Qualification or relegation
1	Flamengo	22	17	2	3	71	24	+47	36	Qualified to Finals
2	Vasco da Gama	22	16	3	3	50	19	+31	35	Qualified to Third round
3	Fluminense	22	14	2	6	44	35	+9	30	Qualified to Third round
4	América	22	13	3	6	54	32	+22	29	Qualified to Third round
5	Bangu	22	12	4	6	53	29	+24	28	Qualified to Third round
6	Bonsucesso	22	11	4	7	33	31	+2	26	Qualified to Third round
7	Botafogo	22	10	3	9	38	33	+5	23	
8	Portuguesa	22	6	2	14	32	52	−20	14	
9	Olaria	22	5	3	14	32	48	−16	13	
10	São Cristóvão	22	4	5	13	25	54	−29	13	
11	Canto do Rio	22	3	3	16	33	56	−23	9	
12	Madureira	22	3	2	17	24	76	−52	8	

Updated to match(es) played on February 5, 1956. Source: RSSSF.com
Rules for classification: 1) points; 2) goal difference; 3) wins; 4) number of goals scored.

=== Third round ===
Pos	Team	Pld	W	D	L	GF	GA	GD	Pts	Qualification or relegation
1	América	5	4	1	0	16	6	+10	9	Qualified to Finals
2	Fluminense	5	3	1	1	11	5	+6	7	
3	Vasco da Gama	5	3	1	1	12	7	+5	7	
4	Flamengo	5	2	0	3	10	11	−1	4	
5	Bangu	5	1	1	3	8	15	−7	3	
6	Bonsucesso	5	0	0	5	2	15	−13	0	

Updated to match(es) played on March 18, 1956. Source: RSSSF.com
Rules for classification: 1) points; 2) goal difference; 3) wins; 4) number of goals scored.

=== Finals ===
26 March 1956 Final	Flamengo	1 – 0	América	Maracanã, Rio de Janeiro
	Evaristo	Report		Attendance: 79,950; Referee: Frederico Lopes

1 April 1956 Final	América	5 – 1	Flamengo	Maracanã, Rio de Janeiro
	Ferreira; Alarcón; Canário; Leônidas; Romeiro	Report	Joel	Attendance: 94,516; Referee: Mário Vianna

4 April 1956 Final	Flamengo	4 – 1	América	Maracanã, Rio de Janeiro
	Dida	Report	Romeiro	Attendance: 139,599; Referee: Mário Vianna

== Top Scores ==
Rank	Player	Club	Goals
1	Paulinho	Flamengo	23
2	Waldo	Fluminense	18
3	Hílton	Bangu	17
3	Pinga	Vasco da Gama	17
5	Leónidas	America	16
5	Leo	Olaria	16
