= Paulinho (footballer, born 1933) =

Brazilian footballer (born 1933)

Personal information
- Full name: Paulo de Almeida
- Date of birth: 15 September 1933
- Place of birth: Campos dos Goytacazes, Brazil
- Date of death: 8 November 2013 (aged 80)
- Place of death: Campos dos Goytacazes, Brazil
- Height: 1.71 m (5 ft 7 in)
- Position: Forward

Youth career
- Goytacaz

Senior career*
Years	Team	Apps	(Gls)
1950	Goytacaz		
1951–1957	Flamengo	144	(58)
1957–1959	Palmeiras	111	(41)
1960	River Plate		
1961	Estudiantes		

International career
1952	Brazil Olympic		
1956	Brazil	6	(1)
- * Club domestic league appearances and goals as of 3 February 2024

Paulo de Almeida (15 September 1933 – 8 November 2013), better known as Paulinho, was a Brazilian professional footballer who played as a forward.

== Career ==
Born in Campos do Goytacazes, Paulinho began his career at Goytacaz FC. In a short time, he was hired by Flamengo, and for the club he played 144 matches and scored 58 goals, being state champion in 1953, 1954 and 1955 as top scorer. In 1957 he transferred to Palmeiras, where he was again state champion in 1959. Paulinho ended his career in Argentine football, after discreet spells at River Plate and Estudiantes.

== International career ==
Paulinho was part of the group that competed in the 1952 Olympics in Helsinki, despite not taking part in any match. In 1956, he participated in some friendlies for the main Brazil national team, alongside his namesake Paulinho de Almeida, scoring a goal against England at Wembley.

== Honours ==
Flamengo

- Campeonato Carioca: 1953, 1954, 1955
- Taça dos Campeões Estaduais Rio-São Paulo: 1955

Palmeiras

- Campeonato Paulista: 1959

Individual

- 1955 Campeonato Carioca top scorer: 23 goals

== Death ==
Paulinho died on 8 November 2013 at Santa Casa da Misericórdia de Campos dos Goytacazes, victim of pneumonia.
