= Valdemar Carabina =

Brazilian footballer (1932–2010)

Personal information
- Full name: Valdemar dos Santos Figueira
- Date of birth: 28 January 1932
- Place of birth: São Paulo, Brazil
- Date of death: 21 August 2010 (aged 78)
- Place of death: Salvador, Brazil
- Position: Defender

Youth career
- Ypiranga-SP

Senior career*
Years	Team	Apps	(Gls)
1951–1953	Ypiranga-SP		
1954–1966	Palmeiras	592	(9)
1967–1968	Comercial-RP		

International career
1961–1965	Brazil	2	(0)

Managerial career
- 1972: Atlético Paranaense
- 1974: Atlético Paranaense
- 1976–1977: Náutico
- 1977–1978: ABC
- 1979: Nacional-SP
- 1980: Atlético Goianiense
- 1980: Grêmio Maringá
- 1981: ABC
- 1982–1983: Central
- 1984–1985: CSA
- 1985: Santa Cruz
- 1986: Treze
- 1987: Palmeiras
- 1987: Treze
- 1988: CSA
- 1989: São José-SP
- 1989–1991: XV de Piracicaba
- 1991: Remo
- 1991: Campinense
- 1992: Santo André
- 1993: CRB
- 1993: CSA
- 1993: Sport Recife
- 1994: Remo
- 1994: Ituano
- 1995: Sport Recife
- 1996–1997: Remo
- * Club domestic league appearances and goals

Valdemar dos Santos Figueira (28 January 1932 – 21 August 2010), better known as Valdemar Carabina, was a Brazilian professional footballer and manager who played as a defender.

== Playing career ==
A defender, Valdemar played for Palmeiras in 592 matches, in addition to scoring 9 goals. One of them earned him the nickname "Carabina", thanks to a comment from a radio presenter who said: "The goal was as precise as a rifle shot." He won the state championship on three occasions, in addition to a Taça Brasil and a Rio-São Paulo.

== Managerial career ==
As a coach, Valdemar Carabina managed several teams in Brazil during the 1970s, 1980s and 1990s, with emphasis on SE Palmeiras, where he was coach in 1987.

== Death ==
Valdemar Carabina died on 21 August 2010, aged 78, in the city of Salvador, Bahia, due to aggravated Alzheimer's disease.

== Honours ==
=== Player ===
Palmeiras

- Campeonato Paulista: 1959, 1963, 1966
- Taça Brasil: 1960
- Torneio Rio-São Paulo: 1965

=== Manager ===
ABC

- Campeonato Potiguar: 1978

CSA

- Campeonato Alagoano: 1984, 1988

Remo

- Campeonato Paraense: 1991
