= 1963 Campeonato Profesional =

Campeonato Profesional
- Season: 1963
- Champions: Millonarios (8th title)
- Matches: 312
- Goals: 1,062 (3.4 per match)
- Top goalscorer: José Omar Verdún; Omar Devani (36 goals each)
- Biggest home win: Millonarios 8–1 Deportes Tolima
- Biggest away win: Atlético Nacional 1–5 Deportes Quindío
- Highest scoring: Santa Fe 8–5 Deportes Tolima

The 1962 Campeonato Profesional was the 16th season of Colombia's top-flight football league. 13 teams competed against one another. Millonarios won the league for the eighth time in its history and third in a row, defending successfully the title won in the previous season.

== Background ==
12 teams from the last tournament competed in this one, joined by Unión Magdalena who returned to the competition after a two-year absence. Millonarios won the championship for the eighth time. The runners-up were Santa Fe.

== League system ==
Every team played four games against each other team, two at home and two away, for a total of 48 matches. Teams received two points for a win and one point for a draw. If two or more teams were tied on points, places were determined by goal difference. The team with the most points is the champion of the league.

== Teams ==
Locations of the 1962 Campeonato Profesional teams:
- 1. Armenia
- 2. Bogotá
- 3. Bucaramanga
- 4. Cali
- 5. Cúcuta
- 6. Ibagué
- 7. Manizales
- 8. Medellín
- 9. Pereira
- 10. Santa Marta

Team	City	Stadium
América de Cali	Cali	Estadio Olímpico Pascual Guerrero
Atlético Bucaramanga	Bucaramanga	Estadio Alfonso López
Atlético Nacional	Medellín	Estadio Atanasio Girardot
Cúcuta Deportivo	Cúcuta	Estadio General Santander
Deportes Quindío	Armenia	Estadio San José de Armenia
Deportes Tolima	Ibagué	Estadio 10 de Mayo
Deportivo Cali	Cali	Estadio Olímpico Pascual Guerrero
Deportivo Pereira	Pereira	Estadio Alberto Mora Mora
Independiente Medellín	Medellín	Estadio Atanasio Girardot
Millonarios	Bogotá	Estadio El Campín
Once Caldas	Manizales	Estadio Fernando Londoño Londoño
Santa Fe	Bogotá	Estadio El Campín
Unión Magdalena	Santa Marta	Estadio Eduardo Santos

== Final standings ==
Pos	Team	Pld	W	D	L	GF	GA	GD	Pts	Qualification
1	Millonarios (C)	48	27	9	12	102	61	+41	63	1964 Copa Libertadores First Round
2	Santa Fe	48	24	13	11	112	81	+31	61	
3	Deportivo Cali	48	23	14	11	77	59	+18	60	
4	Cúcuta Deportivo	48	21	13	14	95	68	+27	55	
5	Once Caldas	48	21	12	15	95	96	−1	54	
6	Deportivo Pereira	48	19	12	17	96	77	+19	50	
7	Independiente Medellín	48	18	14	16	73	66	+7	50	
8	América de Cali	48	14	20	14	73	68	+5	48	
9	Deportes Quindío	48	16	14	18	63	75	−12	46	
10	Atlético Bucaramanga	48	14	13	21	68	80	−12	41	
11	Atlético Nacional	48	15	10	23	79	101	−22	40	
12	Unión Magdalena	48	10	8	30	68	121	−53	28	
13	Deportes Tolima	48	8	12	28	61	109	−48	28	

Source: RSSSF
(C) Champions

== Results ==
=== First turn ===
Home \ Away	AME	BUC	CAL	CUC	DIM	MAG	MIL	NAC	ONC	PER	QUI	SFE	TOL
América de Cali		6–2	2–2	1–1	2–1	3–1	3–2	4–1	1–0	3–1	6–0	2–2	0–0
Atlético Bucaramanga	0–1		1–0	1–1	2–1	3–0	0–2	2–1	5–1	2–1	3–0	1–0	2–1
Deportivo Cali	1–1	4–1		2–2	1–0	5–2	0–1	4–2	2–0	2–1	1–1	1–1	3–0
Cúcuta Deportivo	6–0	0–0	2–3		2–1	1–1	4–1	3–1	6–3	1–1	2–1	1–1	5–1
Independiente Medellín	1–0	0–0	1–3	2–1		3–1	1–1	1–0	1–3	3–1	3–0	3–3	2–2
Unión Magdalena	0–1	4–3	1–2	5–3	1–0		1–1	2–0	2–3	0–0	4–2	3–4	3–2
Millonarios	1–1	1–0	3–2	5–0	2–1	6–0		2–1	3–0	5–2	0–0	3–2	8–1
Atlético Nacional	3–1	3–2	2–1	0–2	3–2	4–3	0–1		3–6	4–4	1–0	0–2	0–0
Once Caldas	0–3	3–1	1–1	3–3	3–3	3–1	2–0	3–1		3–2	2–3	4–1	2–1
Deportivo Pereira	3–0	3–1	4–0	3–2	5–1	5–1	3–2	1–1	3–1		1–1	2–2	3–1
Deportes Quindío	2–1	2–1	1–0	1–0	2–1	5–2	1–0	2–2	3–2	2–3		0–1	1–0
Santa Fe	3–2	2–1	1–0	0–0	2–1	6–2	3–2	2–3	5–1	3–3	3–2		4–0
Deportes Tolima	2–1	2–2	0–0	1–2	1–0	3–0	0–1	2–0	3–4	1–1	0–0	1–3	

Legend: Blue = home team win; Yellow = draw; Red = away team win.

=== Second turn ===
Home \ Away	AME	BUC	CAL	CUC	DIM	MAG	MIL	NAC	ONC	PER	QUI	SFE	TOL
América de Cali		1–1	1–1	1–0	3–2	2–2	0–0	2–4	3–0	0–2	1–1	2–2	2–2
Atlético Bucaramanga	1–1		0–1	0–3	1–1	0–0	1–0	3–1	3–3	1–0	0–0	2–1	1–1
Deportivo Cali	2–1	2–1		3–2	0–1	3–1	1–1	3–2	0–0	3–2	2–1	2–0	2–1
Cúcuta Deportivo	1–1	1–1	1–1		4–1	6–3	1–4	1–0	3–0	2–0	2–1	2–1	5–0
Independiente Medellín	0–0	2–1	0–0	3–1		2–1	2–1	3–0	6–2	2–0	1–1	2–2	2–0
Unión Magdalena	1–1	2–1	1–2	2–1	1–1		0–2	2–3	0–2	3–2	2–2	3–1	1–2
Millonarios	3–2	3–2	2–3	3–1	1–2	2–1		2–2	0–0	3–1	3–2	2–2	4–1
Atlético Nacional	3–2	4–3	2–1	1–1	3–0	1–1	1–2		2–2	0–1	1–5	1–3	1–0
Once Caldas	1–0	1–1	2–0	2–0	1–1	2–1	2–1	3–2		3–1	2–2	2–2	4–1
Deportivo Pereira	0–0	4–1	0–0	1–0	2–2	4–1	2–1	3–1	2–3		5–0	3–3	3–1
Deportes Quindío	0–0	2–1	3–1	0–3	0–1	1–0	1–2	1–1	1–1	2–1		1–3	2–0
Santa Fe	3–1	5–2	2–3	1–2	2–1	3–0	1–2	2–2	3–1	2–1	1–0		8–5
Deportes Tolima	1–1	2–4	1–1	0–2	0–1	5–0	2–5	3–5	4–3	1–0	2–2	1–3	

Legend: Blue = home team win; Yellow = draw; Red = away team win.

== Top goalscorers ==
Rank	Name	Club	Goals
1	(Uruguay) José Omar Verdún	Cúcuta Deportivo	36
1	(Argentina) Omar Devani	Atlético Bucaramanga	36
3	(Argentina) Oswaldo Galarza	Once Caldas	30
4	(Colombia) Antonio Rada	Deportivo Pereira	28
5	(Brazil) José Marin	Santa Fe	26
6	(Argentina) Alberto Perazzo	Santa Fe	23
7	(Uruguay) René Tideo Olaza	Cúcuta Deportivo	22
7	(Argentina) Rubén Pizarro	Millonarios	22
9	(Argentina) Juan Vairo	Deportes Quindío	21
10	(Argentina) Miguel Reznik	Santa Fe	19

Source: RSSSF.com Colombia 1963
