= 1962 Campeonato Profesional =

Campeonato Profesional
- Season: 1962
- Champions: Millonarios (7th title)
- Matches: 264
- Goals: 893 (3.38 per match)
- Top goalscorer: José Omar Verdún (36)
- Biggest home win: Deportivo Cali 9–0 Deportivo Pereira
- Biggest away win: Atlético Nacional 0–5 Millonarios
- Highest scoring: Atlético Nacional 6–4 Cúcuta Deportivo

The 1962 Campeonato Profesional was the 15th season of Colombia's top-flight football league. 12 teams competed against one another. Millonarios won the league for the 7th time in its history, defending successfully the title won in the previous season.

== Background ==
The same 12 teams from the last tournament competed in this one. Millonarios won the championship for the seventh time. The runners-up were Deportivo Cali.

== League system ==
Every team played four games against each other team, two at home and two away. Teams received two points for a win and one point for a draw. If two or more teams were tied on points, places were determined by goal difference. The team with the most points is the champion of the league.

== Teams ==
Locations of the 1962 Campeonato Profesional teams:
- 1. Armenia
- 2. Bogotá
- 3. Bucaramanga
- 4. Cali
- 5. Cúcuta
- 6. Ibagué
- 7. Manizales
- 8. Medellín
- 9. Pereira

Team	City	Stadium
América de Cali	Cali	Estadio Olímpico Pascual Guerrero
Atlético Bucaramanga	Bucaramanga	Estadio Alfonso López
Atlético Nacional	Medellín	Estadio Atanasio Girardot
Cúcuta Deportivo	Cúcuta	Estadio General Santander
Deportes Quindío	Armenia	Estadio San José de Armenia
Deportes Tolima	Ibagué	Estadio 10 de Mayo
Deportivo Cali	Cali	Estadio Olímpico Pascual Guerrero
Deportivo Pereira	Pereira	Estadio Alberto Mora Mora
Independiente Medellín	Medellín	Estadio Atanasio Girardot
Millonarios	Bogotá	Estadio El Campín
Once Caldas	Manizales	Estadio Fernando Londoño Londoño
Santa Fe	Bogotá	Estadio El Campín

== Final standings ==
Pos	Team	Pld	W	D	L	GF	GA	GD	Pts	Qualification
1	Millonarios (C)	44	25	11	8	96	44	+52	61	1963 Copa Libertadores First Round
2	Deportivo Cali	44	25	7	12	104	61	+43	57	
3	Deportivo Pereira	44	21	11	12	77	71	+6	53	
4	Once Caldas	44	22	8	14	84	59	+25	52	
5	América de Cali	44	20	12	12	72	54	+18	52	
6	Independiente Medellín	44	18	11	15	80	81	−1	47	
7	Atlético Bucaramanga	44	16	10	18	65	66	−1	42	
8	Cúcuta Deportivo	44	16	9	19	92	92	0	41	
9	Santa Fe	44	15	9	20	69	84	−15	39	
10	Atlético Nacional	44	10	9	25	56	96	−40	29	
11	Deportes Tolima	44	9	11	24	47	83	−36	29	
12	Deportes Quindío	44	6	12	26	51	102	−51	24	

Source: RSSSF
(C) Champions

== Results ==
=== First turn ===
Home \ Away	AME	BUC	CAL	CUC	DIM	MIL	NAC	ONC	PER	QUI	SFE	TOL
América de Cali		2–1	0–1	3–0	2–0	1–1	2–0	0–1	1–1	4–1	4–3	2–0
Atlético Bucaramanga	0–1		1–0	4–0	1–4	3–1	0–2	2–0	2–0	3–3	3–0	2–0
Deportivo Cali	0–0	4–1		2–1	1–1	2–1	3–2	2–1	9–0	8–1	4–1	4–0
Cúcuta Deportivo	4–0	2–0	2–2		1–2	0–1	5–0	5–3	2–2	3–0	3–2	2–2
Independiente Medellín	1–4	0–0	2–1	2–3		1–2	3–2	1–1	1–4	1–1	1–2	4–2
Millonarios	1–1	3–0	7–0	2–1	2–0		3–1	4–1	0–1	4–1	1–2	1–0
Atlético Nacional	0–3	2–3	1–3	1–1	3–1	0–5		2–4	2–2	3–1	0–0	2–0
Once Caldas	2–1	1–3	2–1	4–2	3–1	0–0	4–0		0–1	2–1	3–2	1–1
Deportivo Pereira	2–1	2–1	2–2	5–0	2–2	0–2	2–1	1–1		4–1	2–0	1–0
Deportes Quindío	3–3	1–2	1–1	2–2	0–0	2–3	0–0	2–0	1–2		0–0	2–2
Santa Fe	1–1	1–1	3–2	2–1	2–1	0–4	1–2	2–0	2–2	0–1		1–2
Deportes Tolima	1–0	0–0	2–1	2–2	3–4	0–0	5–2	1–5	2–0	3–0	0–1	

Legend: Blue = home team win; Yellow = draw; Red = away team win.

=== Second turn ===
Home \ Away	AME	BUC	CAL	CUC	MED	MIL	NAC	ONC	PER	QUI	SFE	TOL
América de Cali		1–0	0–1	1–0	3–0	1–2	2–2	2–1	1–1	5–0	2–1	2–2
Atlético Bucaramanga	1–1		2–2	4–2	2–0	1–1	3–1	0–0	4–1	0–1	1–2	4–1
Deportivo Cali	1–1	2–1		3–0	7–1	3–2	3–1	2–0	4–1	5–1	0–2	3–0
Cúcuta Deportivo	3–0	4–1	2–1		5–0	2–2	1–1	3–0	3–0	3–1	3–3	2–1
Independiente Medellín	2–1	3–1	4–2	6–2		3–3	3–1	1–0	3–1	1–1	4–2	4–0
Millonarios	4–1	0–1	3–2	6–2	2–2		1–0	1–2	1–1	4–2	1–1	3–0
Atlético Nacional	0–1	3–2	0–2	6–4	0–0	0–2		1–1	1–1	2–1	5–3	0–1
Once Caldas	4–1	4–0	3–1	4–1	3–1	1–1	3–0		2–1	5–1	1–0	4–0
Deportivo Pereira	2–2	1–0	0–1	4–2	2–4	0–3	6–0	2–1		4–2	3–2	3–0
Deportes Quindío	1–4	1–1	2–3	0–3	1–3	0–1	2–1	2–2	0–1		3–0	2–2
Santa Fe	2–3	4–1	2–1	2–1	0–2	2–2	2–1	2–4	2–3	2–1		4–3
Deportes Tolima	0–1	2–2	1–2	3–2	0–0	0–3	1–2	1–0	0–1	0–1	1–1	

Legend: Blue = home team win; Yellow = draw; Red = away team win.

== Top goalscorers ==
Rank	Name	Club	Goals
1	(Uruguay) José Omar Verdún	Cúcuta Deportivo	36
2	(Argentina) Oscar Mottura	Independiente Medellín	21
3	(Argentina) Perfecto Rodríguez	Atlético Bucaramanga	19
3	(Argentina) José Vicente Grecco	Independiente Medellín	19
5	(Argentina) Miguel Angel Balocco	Deportivo Cali	18
5	(Argentina) Alberto Perazzo	Santa Fe	18
7	(Colombia) Bernardo Valencia	Deportivo Cali	17
8	(Argentina) / (Colombia) José Américo Montanini	América de Cali	16
8	(Colombia) Guillermo Arredondo	Atlético Nacional	16
8	(Colombia) Alfonso Botero	Once Caldas	16

Source: RSSSF.com Colombia 1962
