= Valdir de Moraes =

Brazilian footballer (1931–2020)

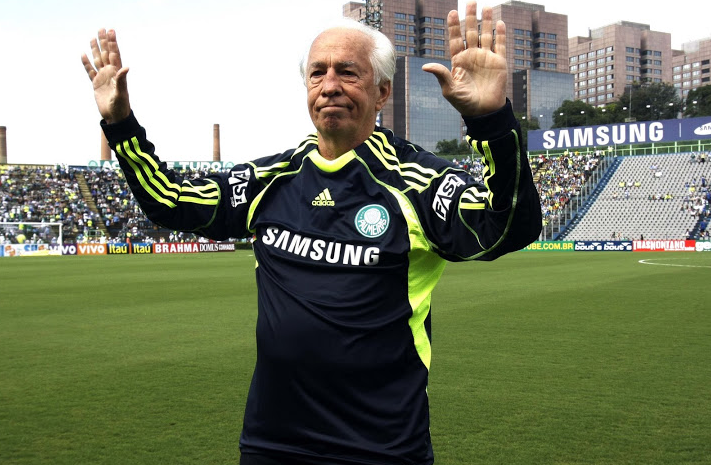
- Valdir de Moraes in 2010

Personal information
- Full name: Valdir Joaquim de Moraes
- Date of birth: 23 November 1931
- Place of birth: Porto Alegre, Rio Grande do Sul
- Date of death: 11 January 2020 (aged 88)
- Place of death: Porto Alegre, Rio Grande do Sul
- Height: 1.70 m (5 ft 7 in)
- Position: Goalkeeper

Youth career
- Renner

Senior career*
Years	Team	Apps	(Gls)
1954–1957	Renner		
1958–1968	Palmeiras	482	(0)
1969	Cruzeiro-RS		

International career
1956–1965	Brazil	5	(0)
- * Club domestic league appearances and goals as of 05 January 2020

Valdir Joaquim de Moraes (November 23, 1931 – January 11, 2020) was a Brazilian football player at the position of goalkeeper. He spent all his playing career with Palmeiras from 1958 to 1969.

On 11 January 2020, de Moraes died at age 88 from multiple organ failure.

== Honours ==
Renner

- Campeonato Gaúcho: 1954

Palmeiras

- Campeonato Brasileiro Série A: 1960, 1967, 1967
- Rio-São Paulo Tournament: 1965
- São Paulo State Championship: 1959, 1963, 1966
- Copa Libertadores runner-up: 1961, 1968

Brazil

- Panamerican Championship: 1956
