= 1961 Copa Libertadores =

2nd season of Copa Libertadores

1961 Copa de Campeones de América
Tournament details
- Dates: April 2 - June 11
- Teams: 9 (from 9 confederations)

Final positions
- Champions: (Uruguay) Peñarol (2nd title)
- Runners-up: (Brazil) Palmeiras

Tournament statistics
- Matches played: 16
- Goals scored: 52 (3.25 per match)
- Top scorer(s): (Argentina) Osvaldo Panzutto (4 goals)

The 1961 Copa de Campeones de América was the second season of the competition, South America's prized football tournament. Nine teams entered, two more than the previous season, with Venezuela not sending a representative. In order to further enhance the competition, CONMEBOL maintained the criteria of having regional clashes in order to take advantage of the cross-border rivalries

Although Peñarol also won their national league, this became the first and, so far, only time the defending champions did not qualify automatically to the next edition. Nevertheless, the Manyas successfully defended their title by defeating Palmeiras in the final.

== Qualified teams ==
Country	Team	Qualification method	App	Last	Previous Best
Argentina; 1 berth	Independiente	1960 Primera División champion	first		
Bolivia; 1 berth	Jorge Wilstermann	1960 Copa Simón Bolívar champion	2nd	1960	preliminary round
Brazil; 1 berth	Palmeiras	1960 Taça Brasil champion	first		
Chile; 1 berth	Colo-Colo	1960 Primera División champion	first		
Colombia; 1 berth	Santa Fe	1960 Campeonato Profesional champion	first		
Ecuador; 1 berth	Barcelona	1960 Campeonato Ecuatoriano de Fútbol champion	first		
Paraguay; 1 berth	Olimpia	1960 Primera División champion	2nd	1960	runner-up
Peru; 1 berth	Universitario	1960 Primera División champion	first		
Uruguay; 1 berth	Peñarol	1960 Primera División champion	2nd	1960	champion

== Format ==
Each match-up was a two-team group stage. Because of the increase in participants, a preliminary group was implemented in the competition, with the rest following the previous season's format. Wins were awarded two points, 1 point for a draw, and no points for a loss. The team with the most points after a home and away game advanced to the next stage.

If the teams still remained tied on points, goal difference became a factor. A one-game playoff would be implemented in case the teams were still tied. A draw of lots was to become the last solution to breaking a tie. Controversially, Independiente Santa Fe and Jorge Wilstermann tied on points which would have required a playoff; CONMEBOL, however, scrapped the idea and decided that the last semifinal slot was to be given by a draw of lots which the Colombians won.

== Tournament bracket ==
Preliminary round
(Ecuador) Barcelona	0	2	2
(Colombia) Santa Fe	3	2	5

First round
(Paraguay) Olimpia	5	1	6
(Chile) Colo-Colo	2	2	4
(Peru) Universitario	0	2	2
(Uruguay) Peñarol	5	0	5
(Brazil) Palmeiras	2	1	3
(Argentina) Independiente	0	0	0
(Colombia) Santa Fe	2	1	3
(Bolivia) Jorge Wilstermann	3	0	3

Semi-finals
(Paraguay) Olimpia	1	1	2
(Uruguay) Peñarol	3	2	5
(Brazil) Palmeiras	2	4	6
(Colombia) Santa Fe	2	1	3

Finals
(Uruguay) Peñarol	1	1	2
(Brazil) Palmeiras	0	1	1

== Preliminary round ==
Team	Pld	W	D	L	GF	GA	GD	Pts
(Colombia) Santa Fe	2	1	1	0	5	2	+3	3
(Ecuador) Barcelona	2	0	1	1	2	5	−3	1

2 April 1961	Santa Fe (Colombia)	3 − 0	(Ecuador) Barcelona	Estadio El Campín, Bogotá
	Panzutto 25', 34'; Perazzo 40'			Attendance: ≈25,000; Referee: Rafael Guerrero Parker (Ecuador)

9 April 1961	Barcelona (Ecuador)	2 − 2	(Colombia) Santa Fe	Estadio Modelo, Guayaquil
	Romero 46', 58'		Perazzo 10'; Panzutto 50'	Attendance: ≈15,000; Referee: Ovidio Orrego (Colombia)

== First round ==
=== Group 1 ===
Team	Pld	W	D	L	GF	GA	GD	Pts
(Paraguay) Olimpia	2	1	0	1	6	4	+2	2
(Chile) Colo-Colo	2	1	0	1	4	6	−2	2

April 9, 1961	Colo-Colo (Chile)	2 – 5	(Paraguay) Olimpia	Estadio Nacional, Santiago
	Hormazabal 45'; Toro 88'		González 12'; Cabral 37', 79'; Ferreira 48', 54'	Attendance: 17,780; Referee: Esteban Marino (Uruguay)

April 16, 1961	Olimpia (Paraguay)	1 – 2	(Chile) Colo-Colo	Estadio Manuel Ferreira, Asunción
	González 1'		Hormazabal 29'; Álvarez 67'	Attendance: ≈35,000; Referee: Pablo Victor Vaga (Uruguay)

Olimpia drew 2–2 with Colo-Colo on point aggregate. Olimpia progressed to the semifinals due to better goal difference.

=== Group 2 ===
Team	Pld	W	D	L	GF	GA	GD	Pts
(Uruguay) Peñarol	2	1	0	1	5	2	+3	2
(Peru) Universitario	2	1	0	1	2	5	−3	2

April 19, 1961	Peñarol (Uruguay)	5 – 0	(Peru) Universitario	Estadio Centenario, Montevideo
	Joya 36', 63'; Spencer 44', 77'; Sasía 85'			Attendance: 57,630; Referee: Carlos Robles (Chile)

April 30, 1961	Universitario (Peru)	2 – 0	(Uruguay) Peñarol	Estadio Nacional, Lima
	Uribe 30'; Iwasaki 37'			Attendance: 12,000; Referee: Carlos Robles (Chile)

Peñarol drew 2–2 with Universitario on point aggregate. Peñarol progressed to the semifinals due to better goal difference.

=== Group 3 ===
Team	Pld	W	D	L	GF	GA	GD	Pts
(Brazil) Palmeiras	2	2	0	0	3	0	+3	4
(Argentina) Independiente	2	0	0	2	0	3	−3	0

May 4, 1961	Independiente (Argentina)	0 – 2	(Brazil) Palmeiras	El Cilindro, Avellaneda
			Gildo 33'; Zequinha 85'	Attendance: 25,000; Referee: Jose Dimas Larrosa (Paraguay)

May 11, 1961	Palmeiras (Brazil)	1 – 0	(Argentina) Independiente	Estádio do Pacaembu, São Paulo
	Scotto 40'			Attendance: 40,000; Referee: Jose Dimas Larrosa (Paraguay)

=== Group 4 ===
Team	Pld	W	D	L	GF	GA	GD	Pts
(Colombia) Santa Fe	2	1	0	1	3	3	0	2
(Bolivia) Jorge Wilstermann	2	1	0	1	3	3	0	2

April 30, 1961	Jorge Wilstermann (Bolivia)	3 – 2	(Colombia) Santa Fe	Estadio Félix Capriles, Cochabamba
	López 8', 76'; Sanchez 17'		Panzutto 13'; Castro 86'	Attendance: 35,000; Referee: Carlos Robles (Chile)

May 7, 1961	Santa Fe (Colombia)	1 – 0	(Bolivia) Jorge Wilstermann	Estadio El Campín, Bogotá
	Claure 26' (o.g.)			Attendance: 25,000; Referee: Luis Ventre (Argentina)

Independiente Santa Fe drew 2–2 with Jorge Wilstermann on point aggregate and goal difference. No playoff was disputed to determine the winner. Independiente Santa Fe progressed to the semifinals after a draw of lots.

== Semifinals ==
Four teams were drawn into two groups of two teams each. In each group, teams played against each other home and away. The top team in each group advanced to the Finals.

=== Group A ===
Team	Pld	W	D	L	GF	GA	GD	Pts
(Brazil) Palmeiras	2	1	1	0	6	3	+3	3
(Colombia) Santa Fe	2	0	1	1	3	6	−3	1

May 21, 1961	Santa Fe (Colombia)	2 – 2	(Brazil) Palmeiras	Estadio El Campín, Bogotá
	Perazzo 8'; Castro 52'		Gildo 7'; Chinesinho 39'	Attendance: 35,000; Referee: João Etzel Filho (Brazil)

May 28, 1961	Palmeiras (Brazil)	4 – 1	(Colombia) Santa Fe	Estádio do Pacaembu, São Paulo
	Romeiro 3' 22'; Tozzi 44' 57'		Mottura 66'	Attendance: 60,000; Referee: Ovidio Orrego (Colombia)

=== Group B ===
Team	Pld	W	D	L	GF	GA	GD	Pts
(Uruguay) Peñarol	2	2	0	0	5	2	+3	4
(Paraguay) Olimpia	2	0	0	2	2	5	−3	0

May 21, 1961	Peñarol (Uruguay)	3 – 1	(Paraguay) Olimpia	Estadio Centenario, Montevideo
	Joya 20'; Cubilla 73'; Cano 87'		González 50'	Attendance: 42,000; Referee: Carlos Nai Foino (Argentina)

May 27, 1961	Olimpia (Paraguay)	1 – 2	(Uruguay) Peñarol	Estadio Manuel Ferreira, Asunción
	Doldán 10'		Sasía 77' (pen.); Cubilla 80'	Attendance: 15,000; Referee: José Luis Praddaude (Argentina)

== Finals ==
Team	Pld	W	D	L	GF	GA	GD	Pts
(Uruguay) Peñarol	2	1	1	0	2	1	+1	3
(Brazil) Palmeiras	2	0	1	1	1	2	−1	1

June 4, 1961	Peñarol (Uruguay)	1 − 0	(Brazil) Palmeiras	Estadio Centenario, Montevideo
	Spencer 89'			Attendance: 64,376; Referee: José Luis Praddaude (Argentina)

June 11, 1961	Palmeiras (Brazil)	1 − 1	(Uruguay) Peñarol	Estádio do Pacaembu, São Paulo
	Nardo 77'		Sasía 2'	Attendance: 50,000; Referee: José Luis Praddaude (Argentina)

== Champion ==
Copa Libertadores de América
1961 Winner

Peñarol
Second Title

== Top goalscorers ==
Pos	Player	Team	Goals
1	(Argentina) Osvaldo Panzutto	(Colombia) Santa Fe	4
2	(Argentina) Alberto Perazzo	(Colombia) Santa Fe	3
2	(Paraguay) Benicio Ferreira	(Paraguay) Olimpia	3
2	(Peru) Juan Joya	(Uruguay) Peñarol	3
2	(Uruguay) José Francisco Sasía	(Uruguay) Peñarol	3
2	(Ecuador) Alberto Spencer	(Uruguay) Peñarol	3
