= Ney de Oliveira =

Brazilian footballer

Ney
- Ney lining up for Brazil in 1963

Personal information
- Full name: Ney de Oliveira
- Date of birth: 6 July 1944 (age 82)
- Place of birth: Sorocaba, Brazil
- Position: Midfielder

Senior career*
Years	Team	Apps	(Gls)
1961–1967	Corinthians	153	(69)
1967–1969	Vasco da Gama	120	(55)
1969–1971	Flamengo	86	(25)
1971–1973	Botafogo		

International career
1963–1968	Brazil	8	(0)
- * Club domestic league appearances and goals as of 7 March 2024

Ney de Oliveira (born 6 July 1944), is a Brazilian former professional footballer who played as a midfielder.

== Career ==
Revealed in the Corinthians youth categories, he was considered by the club's president at the time, Wadih Helu, "as good as Pelé". He played 153 games for the club, scoring 69 goals. He later played for Vasco da Gama, Flamengo and Botafogo.

== Personal life ==
Nei is the father of fellow footballer Dinei.

== Honours ==
Corinthians

- Taça São Paulo: 1962
- Torneio Rio-São Paulo: 1966 (shared)
- Copa Cidade de Turim: 1966

Vasco da Gama

- Troféu The Strongest: 1967

Flamengo

- Taça Guanabara: 1970
- Torneio Internacional do Rio de Janeiro: 1970
