= Osvaldo Panzutto =

Argentine footballer

Personal information
- Date of birth: 25 May 1929
- Place of birth: Argentina
- Date of death: 8 February 1995 (aged 65)
- Place of death: Buenos Aires, Argentina
- Position: Forward

Senior career*
Years	Team	Apps	(Gls)
1948	San Lorenzo	3	(0)
1950–1952	Los Andes	60	(36)
1953–1954	Atlanta	48	(16)
1955–1957	Argentinos Juniors	49	(22)
1958	Sarmiento	8	(5)
1959–1963	Independiente Santa Fe	165	(93)
- * Club domestic league appearances and goals

Osvaldo Panzutto (25 May 1929 – 8 February 1995), also spelled Oswaldo Panzutto or Panzuto, was an Argentine professional football player. He was the topscorer of the 1961 Copa Libertadores with 4 goals.

== Club career ==
He made his Primera División Argentina debut on 14 November 1948 against Tigre while playing for San Lorenzo. He only played three games during that season; he then played for Los Andes, Atlanta and Argentinos Juniors in the Argentine second division. He played two more seasons in Primera with Argentinos Juniors (28 games, 8 goals between 1956 and 1957), and then went back to Segunda, playing for Sarmiento de Junín. As many other Argentine players did, he moved to Colombia: Santa Fe president Jorge Ferro Mancera bought him from Sarmiento in 1959. He made his Colombian debut on March 8, 1959, in Bogotá: during his first season he scored 30 goals in 38 matches. He then led Santa Fe's attack along with fellow Argentine Alberto Perazzo, winning the 1960 national championship. He scored 4 goals during the 1961 Copa Libertadores, and became the competition top scorer for that year. He retired in 1963, aged 34, having played 165 games and scored 93 goals for Santa Fe (while other sources state 163 games and 89 or 105 goals).
