= Ernesto Ledesma =

Uruguayan footballer (1930–2011)

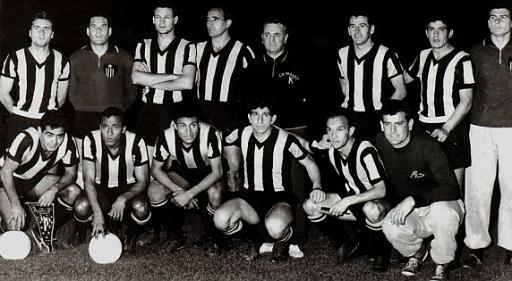
- Peñarol 1961 squad

Personal information
- Full name: Ernesto Ledesma
- Date of birth: 23 October 1930
- Place of birth: Montevideo, Uruguay
- Date of death: 19 January 2011 (aged 80)
- Position: Forward

Senior career*
Years	Team	Apps	(Gls)
1949–1952	Danubio		
1953–1954	Peñarol		
1955–1956	Universidad de Chile	6	(2)
1957–1960	Portuguesa		
1961	Peñarol		
1962–1963	Montevideo Wanderers		
1964–1966	Peñarol		
- * Club domestic league appearances and goals

Ernesto Ledesma (October 23, 1930, in Montevideo, Uruguay – January 19, 2011, in Montevideo, Uruguay) was a Uruguayan footballer who played as a forward for clubs of Uruguay, Chile and Brazil.

== Teams ==
- (Uruguay) Danubio 1949–1952
- (Uruguay) Peñarol 1953–1954
- Universidad de Chile 1955–1956
- (Brazil) Portuguesa 1957–1960
- (Uruguay) Peñarol 1961
- (Uruguay) Montevideo Wanderers 1962–1963
- (Uruguay) Peñarol 1964–1966

== Titles ==
- (Uruguay) Peñarol 1953, 1954, 1961, 1964 and 1965 (Uruguayan League), 1961 (Copa Libertadores and Intercontinental Cup)
