= Paulo Leão =

Brazilian footballer

Personal information
- Full name: Paulo Gracindo Leão
- Date of birth: 18 November 1938
- Place of birth: Lins, Brazil
- Date of death: 8 April 2015 (aged 76)
- Place of death: Campinas, Brazil
- Position: Forward

Youth career
- 1956–1959: Guarani

Senior career*
Years	Team	Apps	(Gls)
1955	Araçatuba EC		
1956–1963	Guarani		
1963–1964	Palmeiras	30	(8)
1964	America-RJ		
1964–1969	Botafogo-SP		
1968	→ Ponte Preta (loan)		
1969	Francana		

Managerial career
- 1972: Botafogo-SP
- 1978: Ponte Preta
- 1979: Operário Ferroviário
- 1982: Avaí
- 1983–1984: Grêmio Maringá
- 1986: Guarani
- * Club domestic league appearances and goals as of 5 October 2024

Paulo Leão (18 November 1938 – 8 April 2015) was a Brazilian professional footballer and manager, who played as a forward.

== Playing career ==
Born in Lins, São Paulo, Paulo Leão began his career at Araçatuba EC, playing for the second tier of São Paulo football. He was hired by Guarani and alternated between the reserve team and the main team. In 1961, he made history by scoring 5 goals in less than 15 minutes, in a Guarani match against EC Taubaté. He later played for Palmeiras where he was state champion in 1963. In 1964 he played for America-RJ but did not adapt, returning to São Paulo and playing for Botafogo, Ponte Preta and Francana, where he retired in 1969.

== Managerial career ==
Paulo Leão worked as a coach after retiring and graduating in physical education.

== Death ==
Paulo Leão died on 8 April 2015 after spending days in the ICU of the Hospital de Clínicas da Unicamp, Campinas. The cause of death was multiple organ failure.

== Honours ==
Palmeiras

- Campeonato Paulista: 1963
