= Romeiro =

Brazilian footballer

Personal information
- Full name: José Romeiro Cardoso
- Date of birth: 3 July 1935
- Place of birth: Taboas-RJ, Brazil
- Date of death: 4 January 2008 (aged 72)
- Position: Winger

Senior career*
Years	Team	Apps	(Gls)
1963–1957	America		
1958–1962	Palmeiras	117	(63)
1963–1964	Millonarios		

International career
1956	Brazil	2	(0)
- * Club domestic league appearances and goals

José Romeiro Cardoso Neto (3 July 1933 – 4 January 2008) known simply as Romeiro, was a Brazilian professional footballer who played as a winger for Palmeiras.

== Honours ==
- Palmeiras
  - Campeonato Paulista: 1959
  - Taça Brasil (Campeonato Brasileiro Série A): 1960
  - Copa Libertadores runner-up: 1961
- Millonarios F.C.
  - Categoría Primera A: 1963, 1964
