= Sílvio Faria =

Brazilian footballer

Sílvio
Personal information
- Full name: Sílvio Faria
- Date of birth: 10 July 1940
- Place of birth: São Paulo, Brazil
- Date of death: 17 May 2003 (aged 62)
- Place of death: Santos, Brazil
- Height: 1.80 m (5 ft 11 in)
- Position: Forward

Youth career
- 1955–1957: Portuguesa

Senior career*
Years	Team	Apps	(Gls)
1957–1967	Portuguesa	195	(116)
1964–1965	→ Millonarios (loan)		
1967–1970	Corinthians	35	(13)
1969	→ Atlético Mineiro (loan)		
- * Club domestic league appearances and goals as of 1 February 2024

Sílvio Faria (10 July 1940 – 17 May 2003), also known as Sílvio or Sílvio Major, was a Brazilian professional footballer who played as a forward.

== Career ==
Top scorer striker, he is among the five players who scored the most goals for Portuguesa de Desportos, with 116 in total. Had a spell on loan at Millonarios in 1964, where he was Colombian champion. He also played for Corinthians from 1967 to 1970, being loaned to Atlético Mineiro in 1969.

== Honours ==
Millonarios

- Categoría Primera A: 1964
