= 1959 Campeonato Paulista =

Campeonato Paulista – Série A1
- Season: 1959
- Champions: Palmeiras
- Relegated: Comercial de São Paulo; Nacional; XV de Jaú
- Taça Brasil: Palmeiras
- Matches played: 383
- Goals scored: 1,358 (3.55 per match)
- Best Player: Pelé (Santos)
- Top goalscorer: Pelé (Santos) – 46 goals
- Biggest home win: Santos 12-1 Ponte Preta (November 19, 1959)
- Biggest away win: Portuguesa Santista 3-9 Portuguesa (October 11, 1959)
- Highest scoring: Santos 12-1 Ponte Preta (November 19, 1959)

The 1959 Campeonato Paulista da Primeira Divisão, organized by the Federação Paulista de Futebol, was the 58th season of São Paulo's top professional football league. Palmeiras won the title for the 13th time. Comercial de São Paulo, Nacional and XV de Jaú were relegated. For the third year in a row, the top scorer was Santos's Pelé, with 46 goals.

== Championship ==
The championship was disputed in a double-round robin system, with the team with the most points winning the title and the three teams with the fewest points being relegated.

Pos	Team	Pld	W	D	L	GF	GA	GD	Pts	Qualification or relegation
1	Santos	38	30	3	5	151	53	+98	63	Playoffs
2	Palmeiras	38	29	5	4	107	32	+75	63	Playoffs
3	São Paulo	38	22	9	7	79	38	+41	53	
4	Ferroviária	38	23	7	8	78	44	+34	53	
5	Corinthians	38	23	4	11	75	45	+30	50	
6	Portuguesa	38	20	5	13	86	62	+24	45	
7	Botafogo	38	12	13	13	61	52	+9	37	
8	Taubaté	38	16	5	17	56	70	−14	37	
9	Noroeste	38	16	3	19	59	67	−8	35	
10	Juventus	38	11	11	16	71	67	+4	33	
11	XV de Piracicaba	38	11	10	17	54	69	−15	32	
12	Jabaquara	38	12	8	18	50	73	−23	32	
13	Guarani	38	12	7	19	57	81	−24	31	
14	Comercial de Ribeirão Preto	38	12	7	19	53	77	−24	31	
15	Ponte Preta	38	12	7	19	57	86	−29	31	
16	América	38	12	6	20	44	78	−34	30	
17	Portuguesa Santista	38	12	5	21	54	90	−36	29	
18	XV de Jaú	38	11	5	22	48	83	−35	27	Relegated
19	Nacional	38	9	8	21	57	90	−33	26	Relegated
20	Comercial de São Paulo	38	6	10	22	52	92	−40	22	Relegated

Updated to match(es) played on December 30, 1959. Source: RSSSF.com
Rules for classification: 1) points; 2) goal difference; 3) wins; 4) number of goals scored.

=== Playoffs ===
5 January 1960

Palmeiras	1 – 1	Santos
Zequinha 34'	Report	Pelé 22'

Pacaembu, São Paulo
Attendance: 38,262
Referee: (Austria) Stefan Walter Glanz
7 January 1960

Santos	2 – 2	Palmeiras
Pepe 25' (pen.) 80' (pen.)	Report	Getúlio 34' (o.g.); Chinesinho 50'

Pacaembu, São Paulo
Attendance: 27,652
Referee: Catão Montez Júnior
10 January 1960

Palmeiras	2 – 1	Santos
Julinho Botelho 34'; Romeiro 48'	Report	Pelé 14'

Pacaembu, São Paulo
Attendance: 37,063
Referee: Anacleto Pietrobon

== Top Scores ==
Rank	Player	Club	Goals
1	Pelé	Santos	46
2	Pepe	Santos	41
3	Servílio	Portuguesa	34
4	Zague	Corinthians	31
5	Coutinho	Santos	28
5	Romeiro	Palmeiras	28
7	Bazzani	Ferroviaría	18
8	Américo Murolo	Palmeiras	17
9	Carlos César	Comercial	15
9	Julinho	Palmeiras	15
11	Neco	São Paulo	14
11	Zé Carlos	Portuguesa	14
