= Roberto Matosas =

Uruguayan footballer (born 1940)

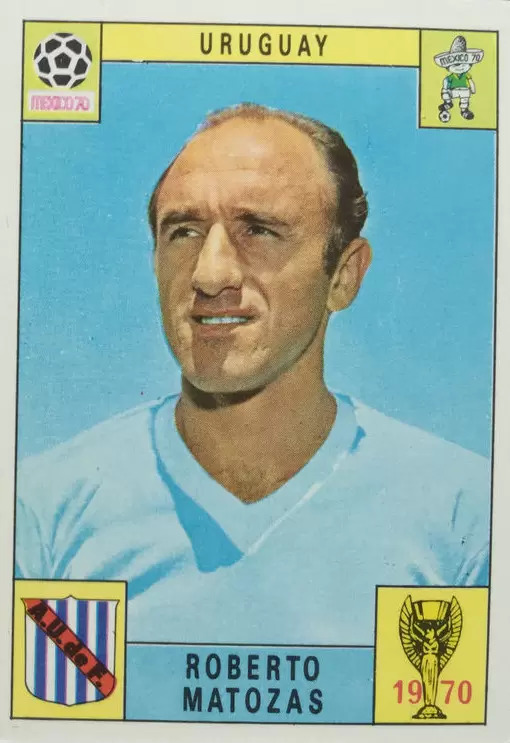
- Matosas in 1970

Personal information
- Full name: Roberto Matosas Postiglione
- Date of birth: May 11, 1940 (age 86)
- Place of birth: Uruguay
- Position: Centre-back

Senior career*
Years	Team	Apps	(Gls)
1960–1964	C.A. Peñarol	14+	(2+)
1964–1968	C.A. River Plate	201	(14)
1969–1972	C.A. Peñarol	30+	(1+)
1972–1975	San Luis		
1975–1976	Deportivo Toluca		
1976	San Antonio Thunder		

International career
1963–1971	Uruguay	20	(0)

Managerial career
- 1976–1980: San Antonio Thunder
- 1980–1982: Atletas Campesinos
- 1982–1983: Tampico Madero
- 1983–1985: Monterrey
- 1985–1988: Deportivo Toluca
- 1988–1990: Veracruz
- 1990–1991: Santos Laguna
- 1991–1992: Veracruz
- 1992–1993: Santos Laguna
- 1999: Veracruz
- * Club domestic league appearances and goals

Roberto Matosas Postiglione (born 11 May 1940 in Mercedes, Department of Soriano, Uruguay) is a Uruguayan former football defender.

== Career ==
At the club level, he played for C.A. River Plate of Argentina and C.A. Peñarol of Uruguay. In September 1964, Club Atlético River Plate signed Matosas for a then-record transfer fee. He played 165 league matches for the club from 1964 to 1968, scoring 12 goals. For River, he also played 36 international games with 2 goals. In 1969, he returned to Peñarol, where he played until 1972. He finished his playing career in Mexico, playing for newly promoted San Luis and Toluca.

Matosas also was part of the Uruguay national football team. He participated in the 1970 FIFA World Cup in Mexico, where the Uruguayan side finished in fourth place.

After he retired from playing, Matosas became a football coach. He has managed Mexican side Veracruz.

The former Uruguayan international Gustavo Matosas is his son.
