= Omar Devani =

Argentine footballer (born 1940)

Omar Devanni
Personal information
- Full name: Omar Lorenzo Devanni
- Date of birth: 1940 (age 85–86)
- Place of birth: Córdoba, Argentina
- Position: Forward

Senior career*
Years	Team	Apps	(Gls)
1959–1961	Vélez Sársfield	17	(2)
1962	Deportivo Morón		
1963–1964	Atlético Bucaramanga	87	(50)
1964	Unión Magdalena	See below	
1965–1967	Independiente Santa Fe	132	(82)
1967–1968	Independiente Medellín	43	(33)
1969	Once Caldas	23	(15)
1970–1971	Unión Magdalena	67	(40)
- * Club domestic league appearances and goals

Omar Devani (born 1940) is an Argentine retired footballer.

== Career ==
He scored a total of 195 goals in the Colombian Primera A.

== Honours ==
Atlético Bucaramanga

- Categoría Primera A top goalscorer (1): 1963
