= Independiente Santa Fe =

Association football club in Colombia

Santa Fe
- Full name: Club Independiente Santa Fe
- Nicknames: Los Cardenales (The Cardinals); El Expreso Rojo (The Red Express); Los Leones (The Lions); El Primer Campeón (The First Champion)
- Founded: 28 February 1941; 85 years ago
- Ground: Nemesio Camacho
- Capacity: 39,512
- Owner: Perlun S.A.S. (52%)
- President: Luis Eduardo Méndez
- Head coach: Pablo Repetto
- League: Categoría Primera A
- 2025: Primera A, 5th of 20 (Apertura champions)
- Website: independientesantafe.co
| Home colours | Away colours | Third colours |

Club Independiente Santa Fe, known simply as Santa Fe, is a Colombian professional football team based in Bogotá, that currently plays in the Categoría Primera A. They play their home games at the El Campín stadium. Santa Fe is one of the three most successful teams in Colombia, winning twenty titles, which include ten national championships (most recently in 2025), five Superliga Colombiana, two Copas Colombia, and international titles such as one Copa Sudamericana, one Suruga Bank Championship, and one Copa Simón Bolívar. Santa Fe is one of the three clubs that has played every championship in the Categoría Primera A.

Santa Fe became the first Colombian team to win the Copa Sudamericana, and the first and only Colombian team to win an official tournament outside America. The club was recognized as one of the ten best clubs in the world in 2015 by the IFFHS, occupying the seventh position and being the best ranked of South America.

Santa Fe has a fierce rivalry with Millonarios who share the same stadium. The game is considered one of the most famous derbies in South America and is known as El Clásico Bogotano or El Clásico Capitalino.

== History ==
Independiente Santa Fe was officially founded on February 28, 1941, as an amateur football team. The club's founders were mainly graduates from the Gimnasio Moderno and of a high social class. Santa Fe was at first going to be a team based on ex-students of Gimnasio Moderno, but later incorporated players from other schools. The primary objective of the club was to participate in a local tournament hosted by the Sports Association of Bogotá. Their first recorded game was against Universal, a match that ended in a goalless draw. The team ended the tournament as runner-up with 20 points, being beaten by Legión Militar Deportiva de los Taxis Rojos, a representative of a transportation company.

In 1942, Santa Fe was coached by Jack Greenwell, former Barcelona player and coach, notable for having won three times the Copa del Rey and the 1939 South American Championship with Peru. That year Santa Fe played in the first division of the A.D.B., which was canceled in the middle of that year. That same year also reached the final of the Torneo de Cundinamarca, which lost against América de Cali. Jack Greenwell died on November 20 of that year.

On 21 May 1948 the DIMAYOR was established in Colombia, which would serve to manage Colombian professional football. They agreed to hold the first professional championship for the second half of the year. On August 15, Santa Fe played its first game in the professional championship against Deportes Caldas, a match that ended 3–3. Santa Fe finished the league as the first champion of the Colombian first division, winning 12 of 18 games, drew 3 and also lost 3. The team was able to score 57 goals for and received 29 goals. The goalscorer of the team was the Spanish Argentine Jesús María Lires with 20 goals, second goalscorer of the tournament.

Next year Santa Fe was third, five points behind the champion, local rivals Millonarios. Seeking for a new title, Santa Fe took advantage of the events of El Dorado signing Argentines Héctor Rial and René Pontoni (the former became a star of Real Madrid years later), as well the Englishmen Neil Franklin and George Mountford from Stoke City, and Charlie Mitten from Manchester United. However, the signings did little, as Santa Fe was not into the top three for about ten years, being their worst the 1954 campaign where they finished last with just five points.

In 1958, Santa Fe got its second title after finishing first with 48 points. They got its third title just two after years with 61 points. Getting this title, Santa Fe became the second Colombian club appearing at the Copa Libertadores. In that tournament, Santa Fe was placed in the preliminary round with Ecuadorian club Barcelona. The first match was a 3–0 victory for Santa Fe and the second game was a 2–2 draw. In the next round, Santa Fe eliminated Bolivian club Jorge Wilstermann. Santa Fe drew 2–2 with Jorge Wilstermann on point aggregate and 3–3 on aggregate score, so the winner was decided by a draw of lots. In the semifinals, Santa Fe faced Brazilian club Palmeiras. The home leg was a 2–2 draw, but Santa Fe lost 4–1 in the away leg.

Santa Fe's first success in the 2000s came late, when the team won the Copa Colombia, beating Deportivo Pasto in the finals. Since then, Santa Fe has had a successful period. Santa Fe got its seventh league title in the 2012 Torneo Apertura, 37 years after its last league title. Santa Fe was second in the First Stage of the tournament with 29 points. In the semifinals, they were grouped with Boyacá Chicó, Itagüí and La Equidad. Santa Fe advanced to the finals with 14 points. Santa Fe faced Deportivo Pasto in the finals. The first match ended in a 1–1 draw and the second was a 1–0 victory for Santa Fe. They got its first Superliga Colombiana title the next year and were runners-up in the 2013 Torneo Apertura, won by Atlético Nacional. In its Copa Libertadores appearance, they got into Semifinals. They began the tournament in the Second Stage, facing Cerro Porteño, Deportes Tolima and Real Garcilaso, where they finished first with 14 points and unbeaten. They eliminated Grêmio in the Round of 16 and Real Garcilaso in the quarterfinals. In the semifinals, they were eliminated by Olimpia, with an aggregate score of 2–1.

In the 2014 Torneo Apertura, Santa Fe was fourth on the First Stage, advancing to Quarterfinals. There Santa Fe eliminated Once Caldas with an aggregate score of 5–3. In the semifinals, the team faced Atlético Nacional. The first match ended in a 1–0 win for Santa Fe. However, Nacional got a comeback with a 2–0 win, thus eliminating Santa Fe. In the Torneo Finalización, Santa Fe was first with 31 points. In the semifinals, the team was placed in a group with Atlético Huila, Atlético Nacional and Once Caldas. Santa Fe placed first in the group, advancing to the finals where they faced Independiente Medellín. Santa Fe won the first match and drew in the second, with an aggregate score of 3–2, winning its 8th title. That year, Santa Fe was runner-up in the Copa Colombia, losing the finals against Deportes Tolima with an aggregate score of 3–2.

In the 2014 Copa Libertadores, Santa Fe played against Monarcas Morelia in the First Stage, drawing 2–2 on aggregate score and advancing to the next round due to away goals rule. In the Second Stage, the team was last of its group, in which they faced Atlético Mineiro, Club Nacional and Zamora, winning only one match of six.

The 2015 season had a great start for the team, as they qualified for the 2015 Copa Sudamericana after winning 2015 Superliga Colombiana in which they faced 2014 Torneo Apertura winners Atlético Nacional. However, in the 2015 Torneo Apertura, the team can not advance to the knockout phase after placing ninth with 31 points. In the Torneo Finalización, the team was 8th with the same number of points as the last tournament, however this time it was enough to advance to the next round. There the team was eliminated by Junior, whom also defeated them months later in the Copa Colombia Finals.

2015 Copa Sudamericana Finals second leg starting lineup

The international season of the team began with its Copa Libertadores participation. The team started in the Second Stage, where they faced Atlético Mineiro, Colo-Colo and Club Atlas. Santa Fe placed 1st with 12 points. In the Round of 16, they played against Argentine team Estudiantes de La Plata. They lost the away match 2–1, but with a 2–0 victory in home the team advanced to the quarterfinals. There the team faced Brazilian club Internacional. The team got a 1–0 victory in the home game, but lost 2–0 in the away match.

Santa Fe got its first international title in the 2015 Copa Sudamericana. They eliminated Ecuadorian LDU Loja in the First Stage and Uruguayan Nacional in the Second Stage. In the Round of 16 they eliminated Ecuadorian Emelec on away goals after drawing 2–2 on aggregate score. In the quarterfinals they won 2–1 on aggregate to Argentine Independiente and in the semifinals they also advanced on away goals after drawing 1–1 with Paraguayan Sportivo Luqueño. In the finals they faced Argentine Huracán. After drawing 0–0 in both matches, the winner had to be decided on penalties. There Santa Fe won 3–1, thus getting the first international title of the club and qualifying for the 2016 Copa Libertadores, 2016 Recopa Sudamericana and 2016 Suruga Bank Championship. Santa Fe's Wilson Morelo tied with three footballers as top goalscorers of the tournament with five goals.

In the 2016 Torneo Apertura, Santa Fe placed fourth, advancing to the next round. There, Santa Fe was eliminated by Cortuluá with an aggregate score of 2–3. In the 2016 Copa Libertadores, the team advanced to the Second Stage after eliminate Oriente Petrolero with an aggregate of 1–6. However, they were eliminated in the Second Stage after placing third in a group consisting of Cerro Porteño, Cobresal (who were last) and Corinthians.

In the 2025 Torneo Apertura, Santa Fe placed sixth, advancing to the semi-finals. After placing first in Group A, the team defeated Independiente Medellín 2-1 in aggregate to win their tenth national title.

== Colours and badge ==
First badge of the club

The first badge of Santa Fe was designed by Ernesto Gamboa and Gonzalo Rueda with a clear British influence. Highlighting the Bogotá flag colors, red and yellow, combined to form the Holy Cross, a symbol of faith and respect, referring to the name of the club.

There are many versions about the origin of the colors of the uniform. The most commonly accepted version is that Luis Robledo, one of the founders of the Independiente Santa Fe who was educated in England, was a fan of Arsenal, thus gives the team the red and white, which from 1941 became the symbol of the club.

Although historically the uniform of Santa Fe has been red and white, the club has used other colors in its uniform.

== Kit manufacturers and shirt sponsors ==
| Period | Kit manufacturer | Shirt partner |
|---|---|---|
| 1980–89 | (Colombia) Saeta | (Colombia) Arroz Futura (Colombia) Caja Social de Ahorros (Colombia) Hotel Cosmos (Switzerland) Milo |
| 1990–91 | (Colombia) Torino | (Colombia) Madame Colette (Colombia) Snacks Colpal (Colombia) Postobón |
| 1992–95 | (Colombia) Saeta | Águila; Club Colombia (Spain) Konga |
| 1996 | (Germany) Adidas | (Colombia) Avianca (Colombia) Costeña |
| 1997–99 | (Brazil) Topper | (Colombia) Águila |
| 2000 | (Colombia) FSS | (Colombia) Águila |
| 2001–03 | (Belgium) Patrick | (Colombia) Águila |
| 2004 | (China) Runic | (Colombia) Águila |
| 2005 | (Italy) Lotto | (South Korea) Samsung |
| 2006 | (Germany) Puma | (South Korea) Samsung |
| 2007 | (Colombia) SSW | (Colombia) Águila |
| 2008 | (Germany) Puma | (Colombia) Águila |
| 2009–10 | (England) Umbro | (Colombia) Águila (Colombia) ETB |
| 2011 | (England) Umbro | (Colombia) Croydon |
| 2012 | (England) Umbro | (Colombia) Aguardiente Néctar (Colombia) AKT (Colombia) ASISTA |
| 2013 | (England) Umbro | (Colombia) Aguardiente Néctar (Colombia) ASISTA (Colombia) Bodytech (Colombia) Canal Capital (Japan) Honda (Italy) Pierre D'Agostiny |
| 2014 | (England) Umbro | (Colombia) Aguardiente Néctar (Colombia) ASISTA (Colombia) Bodytech (Colombia) Bogotá Humana (Colombia) Canal Capital (Japan) Honda (Colombia) Loteria de Bogotá |
| 2015 | (England) Umbro | (Colombia) Bodytech (Colombia) Bogotá Humana (China) Huawei (Japan) Honda (Colombia) Postobón |
| 2016 | (England) Umbro | (Colombia) Aguardiente Néctar (China) Huawei (Colombia) Postobón |
| 2017 | (England) Umbro | (China) Huawei (Colombia) Aguardiente Néctar (Colombia) Postobón (Colombia) INCAP |
| 2018 | (England) Umbro | (China) Huawei (Colombia) Aguardiente Néctar (Colombia) SMART |
| 2019 | (Italy) Kappa | (China) Honor (Colombia) Aguardiente Néctar (Colombia) BetPlay (Colombia) HV Multiplay |
| 2020 | (Italy) Kappa | (South Korea) Hyundai (Colombia) Aguardiente Néctar (Colombia) BetPlay (Colombia) Colanta (Colombia) Ron Santa Fe (Colombia) Cerveza Águila |

== Stadium ==
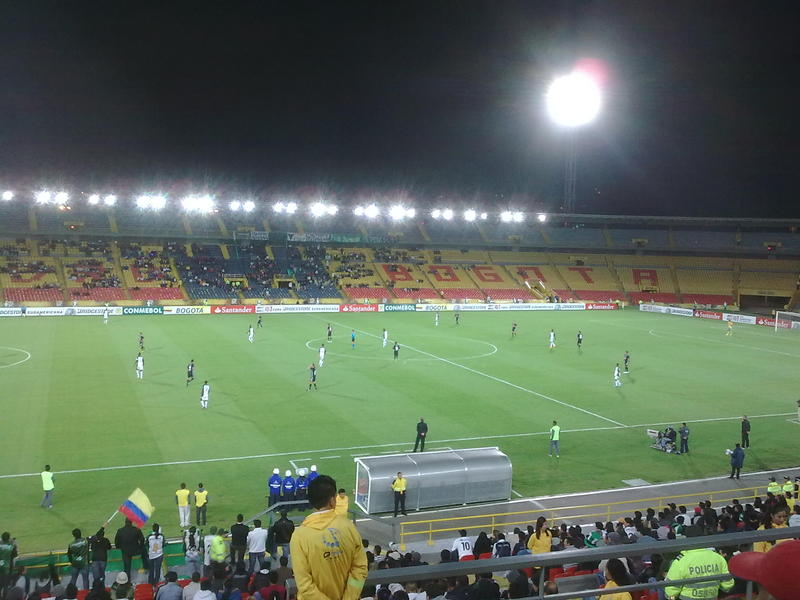
Estadio El Campín on 13 September 2011

The stadium Nemesio Camacho, also known as El Campín, located in Bogotá, is the venue where Independiente Santa Fe plays their home games. Its capacity is 36,343. Santa Fe's supporters traditionally tend to sit in the southernmost half of the stadium.

El Campín was inaugurated on August 10, 1938, at 57th Street with 30, having started its construction in 1935 on the initiative of the mayor of Bogotá, Jorge Eliecer Gaitán. The structure was handled by the German engineer Frederick Leder Müller. The stadium was designed to hold 10,000 spectators. The opening match was held in the 1938 Bolivarian Games, facing the Colombia national football team and the Ecuador national football team, with a 2–1 defeat for the local team.

In 1951, the year that Santa Fe begins to use it to its home games, the stadium expanded its capacity to 39,000 spectators. The second extension of El Campín occurred in 1952 with a dramatic transformation. The total capacity changed to 62,500 spectators, but was limited to 48,000 for security. The last major modification was made for the qualifying matches for the 2010 World Cup in South Africa and for the 2011 FIFA U-20 World Cup.

Other grounds that have been used by Independiente Santa Fe for their home games have been: the Estadio Alfonso López Pumarejo, its first ground, the Estadio Municipal Los Zipas and the Estadio Luis Carlos Galán Sarmiento.

== Supporters and rivalries ==
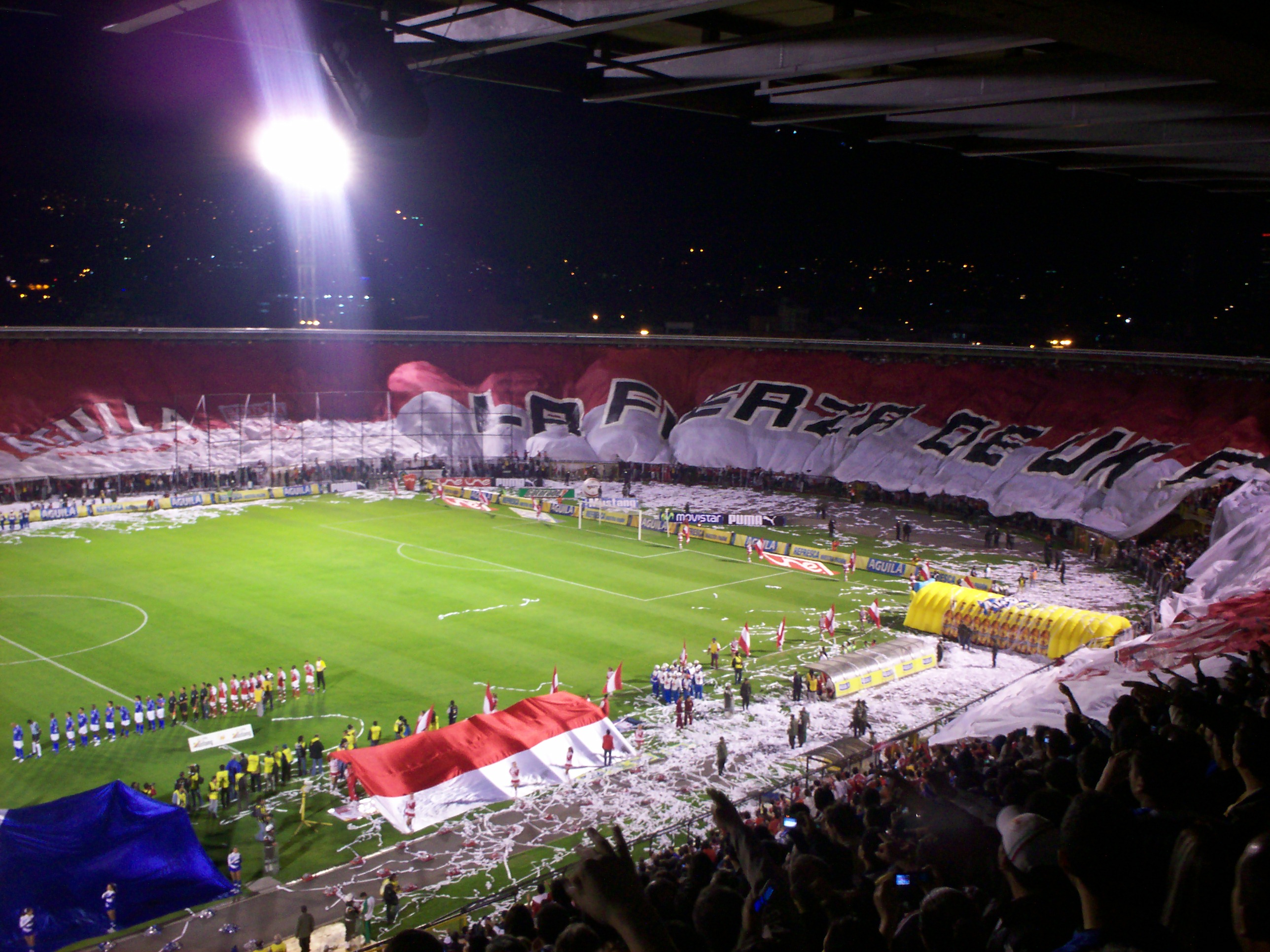
Santa Fe fans in the Estadio El Campín, holding the seventh largest soccer flag of South America.

In the late 1990s, the most notorious Barra brava of Santa Fe, La Guardia Albi-Roja Sur (White-Red South Guard) was created. It was one of the first fan-led organizations in Colombia that was fully formalized. In 2005, La Guardia Albirroja Sur made one of the largest soccer team's flag in the world. The flag, named the Lienzo de Fe was 350 meters long and 38 meters high, covering the southern end of the Estadio El Campín, the half of the stadium, where the team's fans locate in home games.

=== Clásico Capitalino ===
Santa Fe has a fierce rivalry with intercity team Millonarios, who also play in the same stadium as them. During this match Millonarios fans locate themselves in the northern part of the stadium much like Santa Fe's in the south.

== Honours ==
Santa Fe honours
| Type | Competition | Titles | Seasons |
|---|---|---|---|
| Domestic | Categoría Primera A | 10 | 1948, 1958, 1960, 1966, 1971, 1975, 2012–I, 2014–II, 2016–II, 2025–I |
| Domestic | Copa Colombia | 2 | 1989, 2009 |
| Domestic | Superliga Colombiana | 5 | 2013, 2015, 2017, 2021, 2026 |
| Continental | Copa Sudamericana | 1 | 2015 |
| Continental | Suruga Bank Championship | 1 | 2016 |
| Continental | Copa Simón Bolívar | 1^{s} | 1970 |

- record
- ^{s} shared record

=== Runner-up finishes ===
- Categoría Primera A
  - Runners-up (7): 1963, 1979, 2005–I, 2013–I, 2017–II, 2020, 2024–I
- Copa Colombia
  - Runners-up (3): 1950–51, 2014, 2015
- Copa Libertadores
  - Semifinals (2): 1961, 2013
- Copa CONMEBOL
  - Runners-up (1): 1996
- Copa Merconorte
  - Runners-up (1): 1999
- Recopa Sudamericana
  - Runners-up (1): 2016

== Performance in CONMEBOL competitions ==
- Copa Libertadores: 14 appearances

1961: Semifinals
1967: Group stage
1972: Group stage
1976: Group stage
1980: Group stage
2006: Round of 16
2013: Semifinals

2014: Group stage
2015: Quarterfinals
2016: Group stage
2017: Group stage
2018: Group stage
2021: Group stage
2025: Second stage

- Copa Sudamericana: 7 appearances

2010: Round of 16
2011: Quarterfinals
2015: Winners
2016: Round of 16

2017: Round of 16
2018: Semifinals
2023: Group stage

- Recopa Sudamericana: 1 appearance

2016: Runners-up

- Copa CONMEBOL: 1 appearance

1996: Runners-up

== Players ==
As of 24 September 2026

=== First-team squad ===
Note: Flags indicate national team as defined under FIFA eligibility rules; some limited exceptions apply. Players may hold more than one non-FIFA nationality.

| No. | Pos. | Nation | Player |
|---|---|---|---|
| 1 | GK | COL | Andrés Mosquera |
| 2 | DF | COL | Juan Sebastián Quintero |
| 3 | DF | COL | Víctor Moreno |
| 4 | DF | COL | Mateo Puerta (on loan from Águilas Doradas) |
| 6 | MF | COL | Kilian Toscano (on loan from Atlético Nacional) |
| 7 | MF | COL | Jhojan Torres |
| 8 | MF | COL | Omar Fernández |
| 9 | FW | URU | Franco Fagúndez (on loan from Santos Laguna) |
| 10 | MF | COL | Alexis Zapata |
| 11 | FW | COL | Hugo Rodallega (captain) |
| 12 | GK | COL | Weimar Asprilla |
| 13 | DF | COL | Helibelton Palacios |
| 14 | DF | COL | Luis Palacios (on loan from Once Caldas) |
| 15 | DF | COL | Iván Scarpeta |
| 16 | MF | COL | Daniel Torres |
| 17 | FW | ARG | Maximiliano Lovera (on loan from Rosario Central) |

| No. | Pos. | Nation | Player |
|---|---|---|---|
| 18 | DF | ARG | Emanuel Olivera |
| 19 | FW | ARG | Nahuel Bustos (on loan from Talleres de Córdoba) |
| 20 | MF | COL | Yilmar Velásquez |
| 21 | MF | COL | Éwil Murillo |
| 24 | DF | COL | Jeison Angulo |
| 25 | FW | COL | Emerson Rodríguez (on loan from Ludogorets Razgrad) |
| 31 | GK | COL | Juan Espitia |
| 32 | DF | COL | Christian Mafla |
| 34 | FW | COL | Marlon Balanta |
| 35 | MF | COL | Kevin Balanta (on loan from Santos Laguna) |
| 37 | DF | COL | Jhon Rentería |
| 39 | MF | COL | Christian Portocarrero |
| 40 | FW | COL | Martín Palacios |
| 77 | MF | COL | Jáder Obrian |
| — | MF | COL | Andrés Amaya |

=== Out on loan ===
Note: Flags indicate national team as defined under FIFA eligibility rules; some limited exceptions apply. Players may hold more than one non-FIFA nationality.

| No. | Pos. | Nation | Player |
|---|---|---|---|
| — | DF | COL | Alejandro Moralez (at Llaneros until 30 June 2026) |
| — | DF | COL | David Ramírez (at Fortaleza until 31 December 2026) |
| — | DF | COL | Luis Rentería (at Patriotas Boyacá until 31 December 2026) |
| — | DF | COL | Santiago Tamayo (at Forte Virtus until 31 December 2026) |
| — | MF | COL | Leandro Angulo (at Envigado until 30 June 2026) |
| — | MF | COL | Kevin Cortés (at Orsomarso until 31 December 2026) |
| — | MF | COL | Jhon Meléndez (at Águilas Doradas until 30 June 2027) |

| No. | Pos. | Nation | Player |
|---|---|---|---|
| — | MF | COL | Tomás Molina (at Patriotas Boyacá until 31 December 2026) |
| — | MF | COL | Santiago Mora (at Patriotas Boyacá until 31 December 2026) |
| — | FW | COL | Jersson González (at Orenburg until 30 June 2027) |
| — | FW | COL | Edwin Mosquera (at Universidad Central until 31 December 2027) |
| — | FW | COL | Jorge Luis Ramos (at Universidad César Vallejo until 31 December 2026) |
| — | FW | COL | Juan Esteban Sánchez (at Patriotas Boyacá until 31 December 2026) |

=== World Cup players ===
The following players were chosen to represent their country at the FIFA World Cup while contracted to Independiente Santa Fe.

- (Colombia) Carlos Aponte (1962)
- (Colombia) Héctor González Garzón (1962)
- (Colombia) Jaime Silva (1962)
- (Colombia) Hernando Tovar (1962)
- (Colombia) Francisco Zuluaga (1962)
- (Colombia) Eduardo Niño (1990)
- (Bolivia) Juan Manuel Peña (1994)
- (Colombia) Léider Preciado (1998)
- (Ecuador) Édison Méndez (2014)
- (Colombia) Carlos Valdés (2014)
- (Colombia) Camilo Vargas (2014)

=== Records ===
==== Top 10 most appearances of all time ====
Source: BDFA

| R | Player | P | Career | App. |
|---|---|---|---|---|
| 1 | (Colombia) Alfonso Cañón | MF | 1964–1976, 1981 | 504 |
| 2 | (Argentina) Omar Pérez | MF | 2009–2017 | 367 |
| 3 | (Colombia) Carlos Rodríguez | DF | 1956–1966 | 366 |
| 4 | (Colombia) Agustín Julio | GK | 1997–2004 | 353 |
| 5 | (Colombia) James Mina | GK | 1973–1984 | 346 |
| 6 | (Colombia) William Morales | DF | 1981–1994 | 322 |
| 7 | (Colombia) Hernando Cuero | DF | 1981–1990, 1992 | 313 |
| 8 | (Colombia) Manuel Córdoba | FW | 1987–1993, 1997 | 296 |
| 9 | (Colombia) Rafael Pacheco | DF | 1973–1980 | 296 |
| 10 | (Colombia) Ernesto Díaz | MF | 1971–1975, 1977–1979, 1984–1986 | 287 |

Last updated on: 21 January 2018

==== Top 10 scorers of all time ====
| R | Player | P | Career | Gls. |
|---|---|---|---|---|
| 1 | (Colombia) Alfonso Cañón | MF | 1964–1976, 1981 | 146 |
| 2 | (Colombia) Léider Preciado | FW | 1998, 2001, 2004, 2005–2008 | 126 |
| 3 | (Argentina) Alberto Perazzo | FW | 1959–1963 | 98 |
| 4 | (Argentina) Osvaldo Panzutto | FW | 1959–1963 | 93 |
| 5 | (Argentina) Germán Antón | FW | 1948–1952, 1957, 1959 | 91 |
| 6 | (Argentina) Omar Devani | FW | 1965–1968 | 82 |
| 7 | (Colombia) Adolfo Valencia | FW | 1988–1993, 1995–1996, 2002 | 78 |
| 8 | (Argentina) Omar Pérez | MF | 2009–2017 | 77 |
| 9 | (Colombia) Héctor Céspedes | FW | 1975–1980, 1982, 1984 | 73 |
| 10 | (Colombia) Ernesto Díaz | MF | 1971–1975, 1977–1979, 1984–1986 | 72 |

Last updated on: 21 January 2018

== Women ==
Independiente Santa Fe Femenino is the women's football section of Independiente Santa Fe and they currently play in the Colombian Women's Football League, the top level women's football league in Colombia. The club is the most successful team in the Colombian women's football league with three titles, won in 2017, 2019, 2023

Like the institution's male counterpart, who were the first Colombian professional football champions in 1948, the women's team obtained the honor of being the first club to win the Colombian Women's Football League with their title in 2017.

== Affiliated clubs ==
- (Colombia) Patriotas
