= Gildo (footballer) =

Brazilian footballer (died 2019)

Personal information
- Full name: Gildo Cunha do Nascimento
- Date of death: 2 August 2019 (aged 79)

Senior career*
| Years | Team | Apps | (Gls) |
- Palmeiras
- Flamengo
- Athletico Paranaense
- * Club domestic league appearances and goals

Gildo Cunha do Nascimento (died 2 August 2019), known as Gildo, was a Brazilian professional footballer who played for Palmeiras, Flamengo and Athletico Paranaense.
