= Luis Maidana =

Uruguayan footballer (born 1934)

Personal information
- Full name: Luis María Maidana Silveira
- Date of birth: 22 February 1934 (age 92)
- Place of birth: Piriápolis
- Position: Goalkeeper

Senior career*
Years	Team	Apps	(Gls)
	C.A. Peñarol	284	(0)

International career
1959–1969	Uruguay	10	(0)
- * Club domestic league appearances and goals

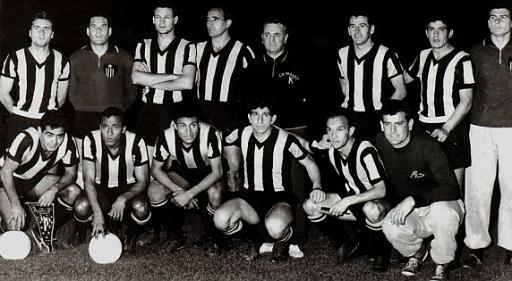
Peñarol - American champion 1961.jpg

Luis María Maidana Silveira (born 22 February 1934 in Piriápolis) is a Uruguayan football goalkeeper who played for Uruguay in the 1962 FIFA World Cup. He also played for C.A. Peñarol.
