= Nardo (footballer) =

Brazilian footballer

Personal information
- Full name: Leonardo Colella
- Date of birth: 13 September 1930
- Place of birth: São Paulo, Brazil
- Date of death: 25 November 2010 (aged 80)
- Place of death: São Paulo, Brazil
- Position: Striker

Youth career
- 1947–1950: Corinthians

Senior career*
Years	Team	Apps	(Gls)
1948–1955	Corinthians	107	(36)
1951–1953	→ Comercial (loan)	40	(21)
1955–1956	Juventus	21	(7)
1956–1961	Palmeiras	160	(57)
1961–1962	Portuguesa	48	(18)
- * Club domestic league appearances and goals

Leonardo Colella, also known as Nardo (13 September 1930 – 25 November 2010), was a Brazilian professional football player who played as a striker.

He played one season in Italy with Juventus in 1955–56.
