= Edgardo González =

Uruguayan footballer (1936-2007)

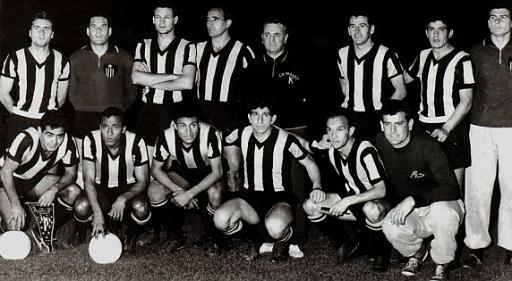

Personal information
- Date of birth: 30 September 1936
- Place of birth: Colonia, Uruguay
- Date of death: 26 October 2007 (aged 71)
- Position: Midfielder

Senior career*
Years	Team	Apps	(Gls)
1954–1961	Liverpool (Montevideo)		
1961–1965	Peñarol		

International career
1957–1965	Uruguay		
- * Club domestic league appearances and goals

Edgardo Nilson González (Spanish pronunciation: [eðˈɣaɾðo ɣonˈsales]; 30 September 1936 - 26 October 2007) was a Uruguayan football midfielder who played for Uruguay in the 1962 FIFA World Cup. He also played for C.A. Peñarol.
