= José Omar Verdún =

Uruguayan footballer (1945–2018)

Personal information
- Date of birth: 12 April 1945
- Place of birth: Montevideo, Uruguay
- Date of death: 12 July 2018 (aged 73)
- Place of death: Cúcuta, Colombia
- Position: Forward

Senior career*
Years	Team	Apps	(Gls)
- Peñarol
- Club Olimpia
- Independiente Medellín
- Atlético Bucaramanga
- Real Cartagena
- Cúcuta Deportivo
- * Club domestic league appearances and goals

José Omar Verdún (12 April 1945 – 12 July 2018) was a Uruguayan professional footballer who played for Peñarol, Club Olimpia, Independiente Medellín, Atlético Bucaramanga, Real Cartagena and Cúcuta Deportivo.

He was the top scorer of the Colombian top division in the 1962 and 1963 seasons.
