= 1963 Santos FC season =

Santos
1963 season
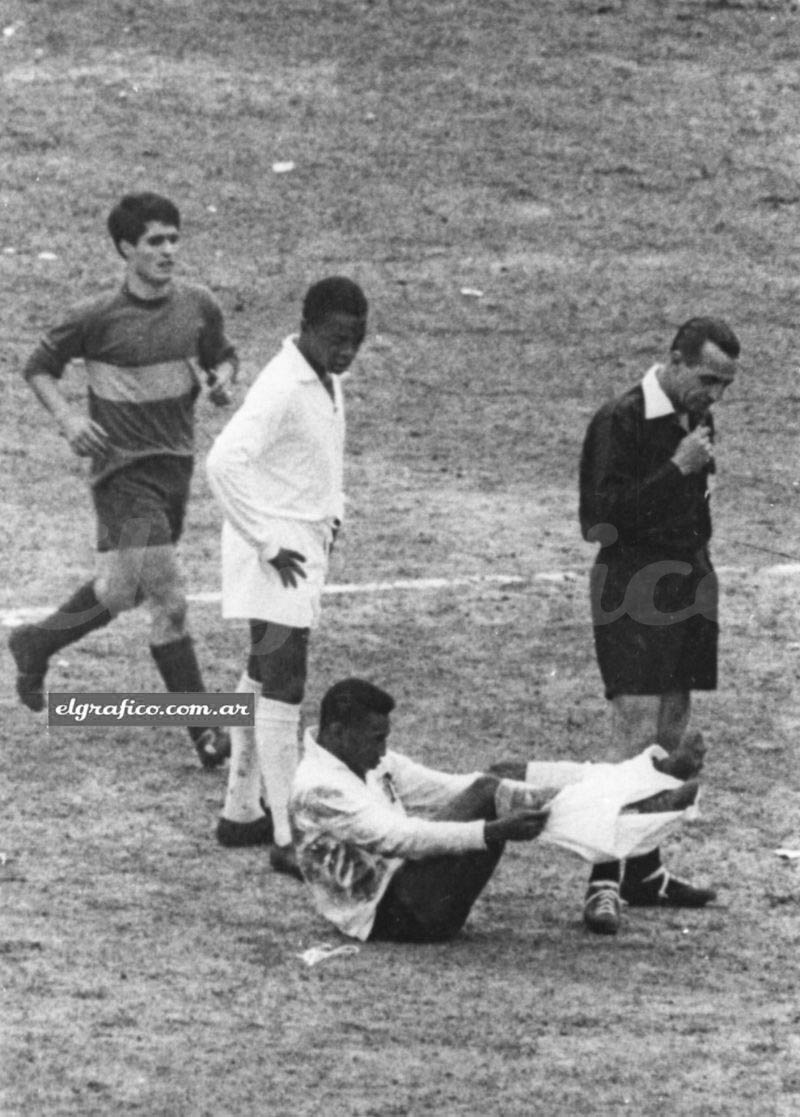
- Pelé (down) putting his shorts back on during the second leg of the 1963 Copa Libertadores finals while Lima (centre) watches
- President: Athiê Jorge Coury
- Head coach: Lula
- Stadium: Vila Belmiro
- Taça Brasil: Winners
- Campeonato Paulista: 3rd
- Torneio Rio-São Paulo: Winners
- Copa Libertadores: Winners
- Intercontinental Cup: Winners
- Top goalscorer: League: Pelé (8); All: Pelé (73)

The 1963 season was Santos Futebol Clube's fiftieth-first in existence and the club's third consecutive season in the top flight of Brazilian football. It was also the club's second consecutive participation in the Copa Libertadores and the Intercontinental Cup.

Repeating the success of the previous campaign, Santos won four of the five official titles played in that season, lifting the Torneio Rio-São Paulo, the Copa Libertadores, the Intercontinental Cup and the Taça Brasil (where they entered in the semifinals and played all four matches in January 1964). They also finished third in the Campeonato Paulista, behind Palmeiras and São Paulo.

== Players ==
=== Squad ===
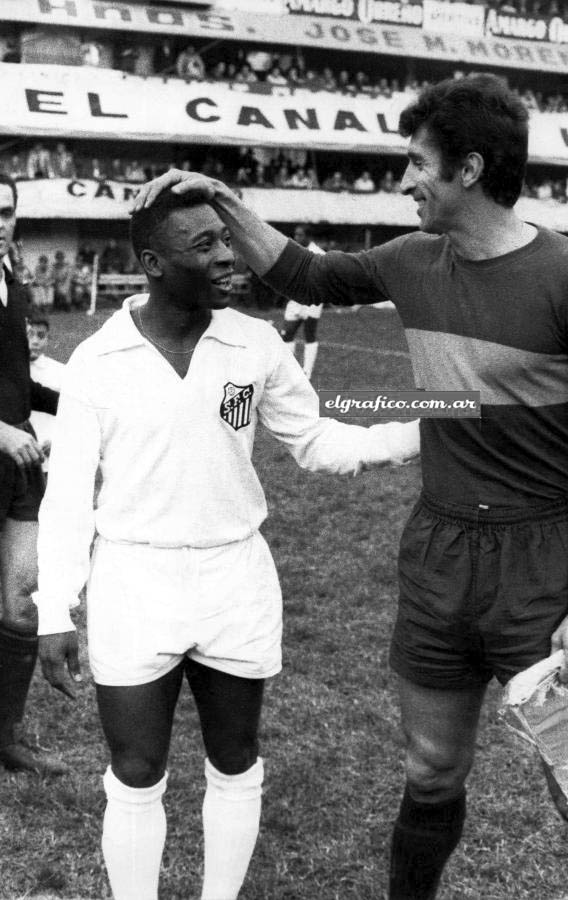
Pelé (left) after the second leg of the 1963 Copa Libertadores finals

Note: Flags indicate national team as defined under FIFA eligibility rules; some limited exceptions apply. Players may hold more than one non-FIFA nationality.

No.	Pos.	Nation	Player
—	GK	BRA	Gilmar
—	GK	BRA	Laércio
—	GK	BRA	Silas
—	DF	BRA	Aparecido
—	DF	BRA	Calvet
—	DF	BRA	Dalmo
—	DF	BRA	Geraldino
—	DF	BRA	Haroldo
—	DF	BRA	Helmiton
—	DF	BRA	Ismael
—	DF	BRA	João Carlos
—	DF	BRA	Joel Camargo
—	DF	BRA	Maneco
—	DF	BRA	Mauro Ramos
—	DF	BRA	Olavo
—	DF	BRA	Zé Carlos
—	MF	BRA	Lima
—	MF	BRA	Mengálvio

No.	Pos.	Nation	Player
—	MF	BRA	Santana
—	MF	BRA	Zito
—	FW	BRA	Almir Pernambuquinho
—	FW	BRA	Batista
—	FW	BRA	Cabralzinho
—	FW	BRA	Coutinho
—	FW	BRA	Dorval
—	FW	BRA	Luiz Cláudio
—	FW	BRA	Nenê
—	FW	BRA	Osvaldo
—	FW	BRA	Nilzo
—	FW	BRA	Pagão
—	FW	BRA	Pelé
—	FW	BRA	Pepe
—	FW	BRA	Rossi
—	FW	BRA	Tite
—	FW	BRA	Toninho Guerreiro

=== Statistics ===
==== Appearances and goals ====
Pos.	Nat	Name	Taça Brasil		Torneio Rio-São Paulo		Campeonato Paulista		Copa Libertadores		Intercontinental Cup		Friendlies		Total	
Pos.	Nat	Name	Apps	Goals	Apps	Goals	Apps	Goals	Apps	Goals	Apps	Goals	Apps	Goals	Apps	Goals
GK	(Brazil)	Gilmar	4	0	9	0	24	0	4	0	3	0	7	0	51	0
GK	(Brazil)	Laércio	0	0	0+1	0	6	0	0	0	0	0	9+4	0	20	0
GK	(Brazil)	Silas	0	0	0	0	0	0	0	0	0	0	1+2	0	3	0
DF	(Brazil)	Aparecido	0	0	0	0	3	0	0	0	0	0	0	0	3	0
DF	(Brazil)	Calvet	0	0	8	0	19	0	4	0	1	0	16	0	48	0
DF	(Brazil)	Dalmo	2	0	9	0	13	1	4	0	2	1	16	0	46	2
DF	(Brazil)	Geraldino	4	0	0	0	17	0	4	0	1	0	8+1	0	35	0
DF	(Brazil)	Haroldo	4	0	0	0	9	0	0	0	3	0	3+3	0	22	0
DF	(Brazil)	Helmiton	0	0	0	0	5	0	0	0	0	0	5+1	0	11	0
DF	(Brazil)	Ismael	2	0	0	0	10	0	0	0	2	0	0	0	14	0
DF	(Brazil)	João Carlos	2	0	4	0	0	0	0	0	0	0	1+2	0	9	0
DF	(Brazil)	Joel Camargo	0+2	0	0	0	7	0	0	0	0	0	0	0	9	0
DF	(Brazil)	Maneco	0	0	1+1	0	2	0	0	0	0	0	0	0	4	0
DF	(Brazil)	Mauro Ramos	2	0	9	0	19	0	4	0	2	0	16	0	52	0
DF	(Brazil)	Olavo	0	0	0	0	14	0	0	0	0	0	1+3	0	18	0
DF	(Brazil)	Zé Carlos	0	0	1+1	0	0	0	0	0	0	0	0+2	0	4	0
MF	(Brazil)	Lima	4	0	8+1	2	30	3	4	2	3	1	8+2	1	60	9
MF	(Brazil)	Mengálvio	2	1	9	4	10	0	0	0	3	0	14+2	0	40	5
MF	(Brazil)	Santana	0	0	0	0	0	0	0	0	0	0	0+1	0	1	0
MF	(Brazil)	Zito	2	0	5	0	6	0	4	0	1	0	4+1	1	23	1
FW	(Brazil)	Almir Pernambuquinho	0	0	0	0	4	0	0+1	0	2	1	0	0	7	1
FW	(Brazil)	Batista	2	0	0+3	0	16	1	0	0	0	0	2+5	0	28	1
FW	(Brazil)	Cabralzinho	0	0	0	0	0	0	0	0	0	0	1	0	1	0
FW	(Brazil)	Coutinho	4	3	5	4	17	13	4	3	3	0	16	10	49	33
FW	(Brazil)	Dorval	3	0	9	2	26	6	4	0	3	0	15	2	60	10
FW	(Brazil)	Luiz Cláudio	0	0	0	0	1	0	0	0	0	0	0+3	0	4	0
FW	(Brazil)	Nenê	0	0	0+1	1	2	1	0	0	0	0	1+10	1	14	3
FW	(Brazil)	Nilzo	0	0	0	0	4	1	0	0	0	0	1	2	5	3
FW	(Brazil)	Osvaldo	0	0	0+1	0	0	0	0	0	0	0	0	0	1	0
FW	(Brazil)	Pagão	0	0	3+1	0	0	0	0	0	0	0	5+7	1	16	1
FW	(Brazil)	Pelé	4	8	9	14	19	22	4	5	1	2	15	22	52	73
FW	(Brazil)	Pepe	3	3	9	2	20	4	3	0	3	0	17	6	55	15
FW	(Brazil)	Rossi	0	0	0	0	16	4	0	0	0	0	0	0	16	4
FW	(Brazil)	Tite	0	0	0+2	0	1	0	1	0	0	0	5	1	9	1
FW	(Brazil)	Toninho Guerreiro	0	0	1+4	0	10	11	0+1	0	0	0	0+1	0	17	11

Notes

Source: Match reports in Competitive matches

==== Goalscorers ====
Ran	Pos	Nat	Name	Taça Brasil	Rio-São Paulo	Paulistão	Libertadores	Intercontinental	Friendlies	Total
1	FW	(Brazil)	Pelé	8	14	22	5	2	22	73
2	FW	(Brazil)	Coutinho	3	4	13	3	0	10	33
3	FW	(Brazil)	Pepe	3	2	4	0	2	6	17
4	FW	(Brazil)	Toninho Guerreiro	0	0	11	0	0	0	11
5	FW	(Brazil)	Dorval	0	2	6	0	0	2	10
6	MF	(Brazil)	Lima	0	2	3	2	1	1	9
7	MF	(Brazil)	Mengálvio	1	4	0	0	0	0	5
8	FW	(Brazil)	Rossi	0	0	4	0	0	0	4
9	FW	(Brazil)	Nenê	0	1	1	0	0	1	3
9	FW	(Brazil)	Nilzo	0	0	1	0	0	2	3
10	DF	(Brazil)	Dalmo	0	0	1	0	1	0	2
11	MF	(Brazil)	Zito	0	0	0	0	0	1	1
11	FW	(Brazil)	Batista	0	0	1	0	0	0	1
11	FW	(Brazil)	Almir Pernambuquinho	0	0	0	0	1	0	1
11	FW	(Brazil)	Pagão	0	0	0	0	0	1	1
11	FW	(Brazil)	Tite	0	0	0	0	0	1	1
Own goals				0	1	2	0	0	1	4
Total				15	30	69	10	7	48	179

Source: Match reports in Competitive matches

== Competitions ==
=== Friendlies ===
==== Matches ====
9 January	Sergipe XI	2–3	Santos	Aracaju
	Rivaldo 33'; Tomás 70'	Report	13', 30' Pelé; 40' (o.g.) Durval	Referee: Romualdo Arppi Filho

- South American tour

23 January	Colo-Colo (Chile)	1–2	(Brazil) Santos	Santiago
	Dalmo 80' (o.g.)	Report	28', 29' Pelé	Stadium: Estadio Nacional; Attendance: 67,437; Referee: Adolpho Reginato

30 January	Deportivo Municipal (Peru)	3–8	(Brazil) Santos	Lima
	Cuadra; Peláez; Guevara	Report	,, Pepe,, Pelé; Coutinho; Dorval	Stadium: Estadio Nacional; Attendance: 24,383; Referee: Alberto Tejada

2 February	Alianza Lima (Peru)	1–2	(Brazil) Santos	Lima
	Zegarra	Report	Pelé; Pepe	Stadium: Estadio Nacional; Attendance: 46,189; Referee: Carlos Rivera

6 February	Universidad de Chile	4–3	(Brazil) Santos	Santiago
	Campos 27'; Sepúlveda 43'; Musso 55'; Sánchez 72'	Report	31', 79' Pelé; 50' Coutinho	Stadium: Estadio Nacional; Attendance: 72,104; Referee: Domingos Massaro

10 February	Naval (Chile)	0–5	(Brazil) Santos	Talcahuano
		Report	23' Tite; 33' Pagão; 38', 48' Pelé; 56' Nenê	Stadium: El Morro; Attendance: 12,286; Referee: José Luiz Silva

- European tour

25 May	Partizan (Socialist Federal Republic of Yugoslavia)	1–1	(Brazil) Santos	Strasbourg
	Hasanagić 60'	Report	43' Coutinho	Stadium: La Meinau; Attendance: 23,000~

29 May	Niedersachsen XI (West Germany)	2–3	(Brazil) Santos	Hanover
	Ulsaß 15'; Lattek 75'	Report	2' Pelé; 3' Zito; 8' Pepe	Attendance: 35,000~; Referee: Schulenberg

2 June	Schalke 04 (West Germany)	1–2	(Brazil) Santos	Essen
	Koslowski	Report	Coutinho; Pelé	Stadium: Stadion an der Hafenstrasse; Attendance: 20,000~; Referee: Pit Roomer

5 June	Eintracht Frankfurt (West Germany)	2–5	(Brazil) Santos	Frankfurt
	Weilbächer 48'; Schämer 79'	Report	2' Coutinho; 8', 17', 21', 49' Pelé	Stadium: Waldstadion; Attendance: 30,000~; Referee: Tachenscher

8 June	VfB Stuttgart (West Germany)	1–3	(Brazil) Santos	Stuttgart
	Reiner 20'	Report	67' Pelé; 80' Dorval; 83' Coutinho	Stadium: Neckarstadion; Attendance: 50,000~

12 June	Barcelona (Spain)	2–0	(Brazil) Santos	Barcelona
	Pereda 75'; Zaballa 87'	Report	67' Pelé; 80' Dorval; 83' Coutinho	Stadium: Camp Nou; Attendance: 90,000~; Referee: Simo Fiel

15 June	Roma (Italy)	3–4	(Brazil) Santos	Rome
	Leonardi; Angelillo; De Sisti	Report	, Coutinho, Pelé	Stadium: Stadio Olimpico; Attendance: 60,000~; Referee: Ourevian

19 June Torneo Città di Milano	Internazionale (Italy)	2–0	(Brazil) Santos	Milan
	Di Giacomo; Corso	Report		Stadium: San Siro; Attendance: 90,000~; Referee: Anthony Bichelin

22 June Torneo Città di Milano	Milan (Italy)	4–0	(Brazil) Santos	Milan
	Altafini,,,	Report		Stadium: San Siro; Attendance: 70,000~; Referee: Keller

26 June	Juventus (Italy)	5–3	(Brazil) Santos	Turin
	Sívori,, Gori; Menichelli	Report	Coutinho; Pepe; Pelé	Stadium: Stadio Comunale; Attendance: 60,000~; Referee: Kitabdsian

10 July	Santos	4–0	Madureira	Santos
	Coutinho 7'; Lima 24'; Nilzo 31', 57'	Report		Stadium: Vila Belmiro; Attendance: 3,200~; Referee: João Batista dos Santos

=== Rio-São Paulo ===
#	Team	Pld	W	D	L	GF	GA	GD	Pts
1	Santos (C)	9	6	1	2	30	15	15	13
2	Corinthians	9	6	0	3	15	9	6	12
3	Fluminense	9	4	3	2	13	12	1	11
4	Botafogo	9	3	4	2	16	14	2	10
5	Palmeiras	9	4	2	3	12	12	0	10

==== Matches ====
16 February 1	Vasco da Gama	2–2	Santos	Rio de Janeiro
	Ronaldo 38'; Sabará 57'	Report	86', 87' Pelé	Stadium: Maracanã; Attendance: 29,200~; Referee: Stefan Walter Glanz

20 February 2	Santos	6–3	Portuguesa	São Paulo
	Pelé 2', 26'; Mengálvio 16'; Lima 47', 68'; Pepe 57'	Report	46' Nair; 62' Neivaldo; 78' Cássio	Stadium: Pacaembu; Attendance: 10,700~; Referee: João Etzel Filho

3 March 3	Santos	2–0	Corinthians	São Paulo
	Pelé 82', 89'	Report		Stadium: Pacaembu; Attendance: 62,851; Referee: Anacleto Pietrobom

7 March 4	Santos	6–2	São Paulo	São Paulo
	Pelé 30', 56', 84' (pen.); Nenê 65'; Pepe 86'; Dorval 90+3'	Report	28' (pen.), (red card) 90+5' Dias; 32', (red card) 83' Prado; (red card) 84' De Sordi; (red card) 89' Faustino	Stadium: Pacaembu; Attendance: 30,000~; Referee: Airton Viera de Moraes

13 March 5	Santos	3–0	Palmeiras	São Paulo
	Mengálvio 15'; Coutinho 32', 44'	Report		Stadium: Pacaembu; Attendance: 55,726; Referee: Anacleto Pietrobom

16 March 6	Santos	5–1	Olaria	São Paulo
	Pelé 5', 28', 87' (pen.); Coutinho 46'; Mengálvio 56'	Report	38' Luiz Carlos	Stadium: Pacaembu; Attendance: 7,126; Referee: Amilcar Ferreira

23 March 7	Santos	2–4	Fluminense	São Paulo
	Mengálvio 6'; Pelé 45'	Report	30', 76' Ubiracy; 43', 74' Manuel	Stadium: Pacaembu; Attendance: 6,200~; Referee: Antônio Viug

31 March 8	Flamengo	0–3	Santos	Rio de Janeiro
		Report	53' Coutinho; 67' Dorval; 75' Pelé	Stadium: Maracanã; Attendance: 45,988; Referee: Romualdo Arppi Filho

31 March 9	Botafogo	3–1	Santos	Rio de Janeiro
	Édison 31'; Quarentinha 50'; Amarildo 70'	Report	87' (o.g.) Rildo	Stadium: Maracanã; Attendance: 102,260; Referee: Catão Montez Júnior
Note: The match also served as the second leg of the 1962 Taça Brasil finals

=== Campeonato Paulista ===
#	Team	Pld	W	D	L	GF	GA	GD	Pts
1	Palmeiras (C)	30	22	6	2	67	28	39	50
2	São Paulo	30	18	8	4	56	26	30	44
3	Santos	30	14	8	8	69	52	17	36
4	São Bento	30	13	6	11	49	48	1	32
5	Juventus	30	11	9	10	45	36	9	31

==== Matches ====
14 July 1	Santos	3–1	São Bento	Santos
	Dorval 7', (red card); Coutinho 26'; Dalmo 89' (pen.)	Report	51' Picolé	Stadium: Vila Belmiro; Attendance: 10,100~; Referee: Eunápio de Queiróz

17 July 2	Santos	3–1	Comercial-RP	Santos
	Nenê 60'; Coutinho 63', 81'	Report	55' Marco Antônio	Stadium: Vila Belmiro; Attendance: 10,470~; Referee: Armando Marques

21 July 3	Noroeste	3–4	Santos	Bauru
	Daniel Bauru, Zé Carlos (red card) (red card) (red card) (red card)	Report	,,, Pelé	Stadium: Ubaldo Medeiros; Attendance: 8,300~; Referee: Albino Zanferrari

24 July 4	Santos	1–1	Portuguesa	Santos
	Pepe 25'	Report	23' Pampolini	Stadium: Vila Belmiro; Attendance: 19,891; Referee: Armando Marques

28 July 5	Santos	5–2	Jabaquara	Santos
	Toninho,, Pelé; Batista	Report	, Cabrita	Stadium: Vila Belmiro; Attendance: 8,800~; Referee: Romualdo Arppi Filho

31 July 6	Esportiva Guaratinguetá	2–2	Santos	Guaratinguetá
	Dati 9'; Nemi 25'	Report	21' Pelé; 35' (o.g.) Jorge Guará	Stadium: Benedito Meirelles; Attendance: 7,100~; Referee: Armando Marques

4 August 7	Guarani	1–2	Santos	Campinas
	Berico 79'	Report	14' Pepe; 90' Pelé	Stadium: Brinco de Ouro; Attendance: 15,000~; Referee: Eunápio de Queiróz

7 August 8	Palmeiras	1–1	Santos	São Paulo
	Paulo Leão 41'	Report	16' Dorval	Stadium: Pacaembu; Attendance: 45,200~; Referee: Armando Marques

15 August 9	São Paulo	4–1	Santos	São Paulo
	Faustino; Benê; Sabino; Pagão	Report	, (red card) Pelé; (red card) Coutinho	Stadium: Pacaembu; Attendance: 60,115; Referee: Armando Marques

18 August 10	XV de Piracicaba	0–0	Santos	Piracicaba
		Report		Stadium: Roberto Gomes Pedrosa; Attendance: 10,000~; Referee: Anacleto Pietrobom

1 September 11	Ferroviária	4–1	Santos	Araraquara
	Peixinho, Tales; Pio	Report	Pelé	Stadium: Fonte Luminosa; Attendance: 8,000~; Referee: Anacleto Pietrobom

18 September 12	Santos	2–2	Prudentina	Santos
	Pelé (pen.); Lima	Report	(o.g.) Haroldo; Ademar Pantera; (red card) Flávio	Stadium: Vila Belmiro; Attendance: 11,700~; Referee: Eunápio de Queiróz

22 September 13	Santos	3–1	Corinthians	São Paulo
	Pelé 33' (pen.), 70', 88'	Report	7' Silva Batuta	Stadium: Pacaembu; Attendance: 29,193; Referee: Armando Marques

25 September 14	Santos	3–1	Juventus	Santos
	Rossi 15'; Dorval 62'	Report	61' (pen.) Célio	Stadium: Vila Belmiro; Attendance: 10,400~; Referee: Anacleto Pietrobom

29 September 15	Botafogo	1–3	Santos	Ribeirão Preto
	Hélio Silvestre	Report	Pelé; Coutinho; Dorval	Stadium: Luís Pereira; Attendance: 11,265; Referee: Frederico Lopes

2 October 16	Santos	4–2	Noroeste	Santos
	Coutinho,, Pelé	Report	, Araras	Stadium: Vila Belmiro; Attendance: 6,254; Referee: Etelvino Rodrigues

5 October 17	Prudentina	0–4	Santos	Presidente Prudente
		Report	,, Pelé; Coutinho	Stadium: Félix Ribeiro Marcondes; Attendance: 9,000~; Referee: Frederico Lopes

9 October 18	Santos	5–1	Esportiva Guaratinguetá	Santos
	Coutinho, Toninho,,	Report	Frazão	Stadium: Vila Belmiro; Attendance: 8,000~; Referee: Benedito Francisco

24 October 19	Portuguesa	3–2	Santos	São Paulo
	Ivair, Gino	Report	Coutinho; Pelé	Stadium: Pacaembu; Attendance: 15,300~; Referee: Anacleto Pietrobom

27 October 20	Comercial-RP	0–3	Santos	Ribeirão Preto
		Report	32' (pen.), 54' Pelé; 80' Pepe	Stadium: Costa Coelho; Attendance: 9,102; Referee: Anacleto Pietrobom

30 October 21	São Bento	3–2	Santos	Sorocaba
	5' Raimundinho; 25' Bazzaninho; 44' Picolé	Report	30' Pelé; Toninho	Stadium: Carlos Joel Nelli; Attendance: 13,327; Referee: Albino Zanferrari

2 November 22	Juventus	0–0	Santos	São Paulo
		Report		Stadium: Pacaembu; Attendance: 17,000~; Referee: Anacleto Pietrobom

6 November 23	Santos	5–0	XV de Piracicaba	Santos
	Lima; Toninho,, Pepe	Report		Stadium: Vila Belmiro; Attendance: 9,123; Referee: Frederico Lopes

20 November 24	Palmeiras	1–0	Santos	São Paulo
	Ademir da Guia 86'	Report		Stadium: Pacaembu; Attendance: 42,300~; Referee: Armando Marques

24 November 25	Santos	1–4	Botafogo	Santos
	Toninho	Report	, Antoninho; Adalberto; Rezende	Stadium: Vila Belmiro; Attendance: 6,697; Referee: Eunápio de Queiroz

27 November 26	São Paulo	1–1	Santos	São Paulo
	Dias 80' (pen.)	Report	19' Lima; (red card) Nilzo	Stadium: Pacaembu; Attendance: 25,200~; Referee: Armando Marques

4 December 27	Santos	1–2	Guarani	Santos
	Nilzo 53'	Report	20' Felício; 76' Vicente	Stadium: Vila Belmiro; Attendance: 5,207; Referee: Benedito Francisco

8 December 28	Santos	1–5	Ferroviária	Santos
	Dorval	Report	,, Peixinho, Tales	Stadium: Vila Belmiro; Attendance: 3,358; Referee: Frederico Lopes

11 December 29	Santos	5–3	Jabaquara	Santos
	Coutinho 1', 89'; Dorval 36'; Rossi 41', 85' (pen.)	Report	6' Buzzone; 32', 58' Elias	Stadium: Vila Belmiro; Attendance: 4,583; Referee: Benedito Francisco

14 December 30	Corinthians	2–2	Santos	São Paulo
	Marcos 40'; Lima 70'	Report	5' (o.g.) Amaro; 49' Rossi	Stadium: Pacaembu; Attendance: 7,400~; Referee: Armando Marques

=== Copa Libertadores ===
==== Semifinals ====
22 August First leg	Santos (Brazil)	1–1	(Brazil) Botafogo	São Paulo
	Pelé 90'	Report	59' Jairzinho	Stadium: Pacaembu; Attendance: 20,000~; Referee: Eunápio de Queiroz

28 August Second leg	Botafogo (Brazil)	0–4	(Brazil) Santos	Rio de Janeiro
		Report	11', 15', 33' Pelé; 81' Lima	Stadium: Maracanã; Attendance: 44,232; Referee: Eunápio de Queiroz

==== Finals ====
3 September First leg	Santos (Brazil)	3–2	(Argentina) Boca Juniors	Rio de Janeiro
	Coutinho 2', 21'; Lima 28'	Report	43', 89' Sanfilippo	Stadium: Maracanã; Attendance: 63,376; Referee: Marcel Albert Bois

11 September Second leg	Boca Juniors (Argentina)	1–2	(Brazil) Santos	Buenos Aires
	Sanfilippo 46'	Report	50' Coutinho; 82', Pelé	Stadium: Estadio Camilo Cichero; Attendance: 85,000~; Referee: Marcel Albert Bois

=== Intercontinental Cup ===
==== Finals ====
16 October First leg	Milan (Italy)	4–2	(Brazil) Santos	Milan
	Trapattoni 3'; Amarildo 15', 67'; Mora 82'	Report	55', 84' (pen.) Pelé	Stadium: San Siro; Attendance: 51,917; Referee: Alfred Haberfellner

14 November Second leg	Santos (Brazil)	4–2	(Italy) Milan	Rio de Janeiro
	Pepe 50', 68'; Almir 54'; Lima 65'	Report	12' Altafini; 17' Mora	Stadium: Maracanã; Attendance: 132,728; Referee: Juan Regis Brozzi

16 November Play-off	Santos (Brazil)	1–0	(Italy) Milan	Rio de Janeiro
	Dalmo 31' (pen.); Ismael (red card) 44'	Report	(red card) 34' Maldini	Stadium: Maracanã; Attendance: 120,421; Referee: Juan Regis Brozzi

=== Taça Brasil ===
==== Results summary ====
Overall								Home						Away					
Pld	W	D	L	GF	GA	GD	Pts	W	D	L	GF	GA	GD	W	D	L	GF	GA	GD
4	4	0	0	15	4	+11	8	2	0	0	10	3	+7	2	0	0	5	1	+4

==== Semifinals ====
16 January 1964 First leg	Grêmio	1–3	Santos	Porto Alegre
	Paulo Lumumba 7'	Report	25', 70' Coutinho; 81' Pelé	Stadium: Olímpico; Attendance: 50,000~; Referee: Eunápio de Queiroz

19 January 1964 Second leg	Santos	4–3	Grêmio	São Paulo
	Pepe 6'; Pelé 30' (pen.), 58', 83' (pen.); Gilmar (red card) 88'	Report	9', 56' Paulo Lumumba; 15' Marino	Stadium: Pacaembu; Referee: Teodoro Nitti
Note: After Gilmar was sent off, Pelé went to goal

==== Finals ====
25 January 1964 First leg	Santos	6–0	Bahia	São Paulo
	Pepe 7', 90+1'; Pelé 28' (pen.), 87' (pen.); Coutinho 63'; Mengálvio 81'	Report		Stadium: Pacaembu; Attendance: 33,000~; Referee: Armando Marques

28 January 1964 Second leg	Bahia	0–2	Santos	Salvador
		Report	28', 85' Pelé	Stadium: Fonte Nova; Attendance: 35,365; Referee: Armando Marques
