= 1962 Santos FC season =

Santos
1962 season
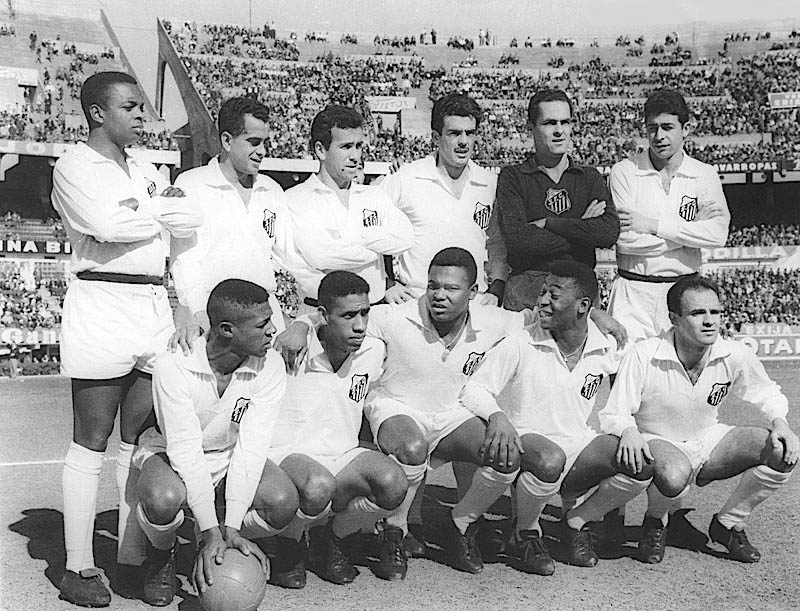
- Santos lineup before a match against Peñarol in August 1962
- President: Athiê Jorge Coury
- Head coach: Lula
- Stadium: Vila Belmiro
- Taça Brasil: Winners
- Campeonato Paulista: Winners
- Copa Libertadores: Winners
- Intercontinental Cup: Winners
- Taça Estado de São Paulo: Runners-up
- Top goalscorer: League: Coutinho (7); All: Coutinho (65)

The 1962 season was Santos Futebol Clube's fiftieth in existence and the club's second consecutive season in the top flight of Brazilian football. It was also the club's first-ever participation in the Copa Libertadores and the Intercontinental Cup.

Santos won four of the five official titles played in that campaign, lifting the Copa Libertadores, the Intercontinental Cup, the Campeonato Paulista and the Taça Brasil (with the final match played in April 1963). They also finished second in the Taça Estado de São Paulo (later considered as the first edition of the Copa Paulista), which the club played without several key players who were serving the Brazil national team in the 1962 FIFA World Cup.

Santos also played friendlies in South America and Europe, playing for the third consecutive time in the Tournoi de Paris. In that tournament, also played during the World Cup, the club finished fourth and failed to repeat the same success of the previous years.

This season was considered by many as the peak of the Os Santásticos, as the club's most successful campaign ever.

== Players ==
=== Squad ===
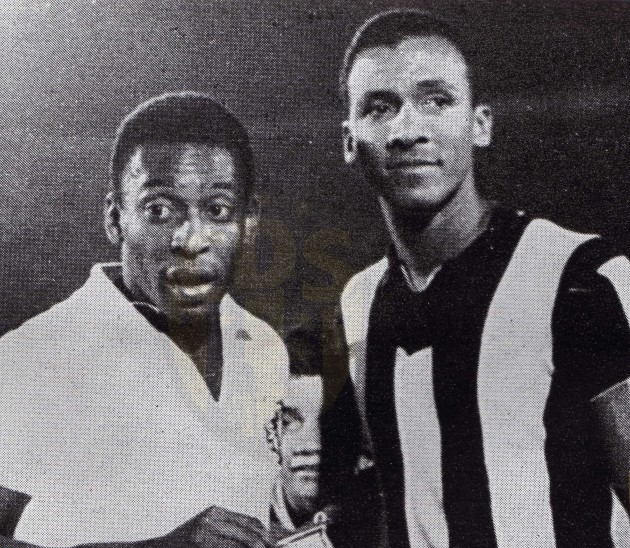
Pelé (left) playing in the second leg of the 1962 Copa Libertadores finals

Note: Flags indicate national team as defined under FIFA eligibility rules; some limited exceptions apply. Players may hold more than one non-FIFA nationality.

No.	Pos.	Nation	Player
—	GK	BRA	Carlindo (Note: Played more often for the Aspirantes squad (reserve team))
—	GK	BRA	Gilmar
—	GK	BRA	Laércio
—	GK	BRA	Rosan
—	GK	BRA	Silas
—	DF	BRA	Calvet
—	DF	BRA	Dalmo
—	DF	BRA	Décio Brito
—	DF	BRA	Ismael
—	DF	BRA	Figueiró
—	DF	BRA	Fioti
—	DF	BRA	Formiga
—	DF	BRA	Getúlio
—	DF	BRA	Helmiton
—	DF	BRA	João Carlos
—	DF	BRA	Maneco
—	DF	BRA	Mauro Ramos
—	DF	BRA	Olavo
—	DF	BRA	Zé Carlos

No.	Pos.	Nation	Player
—	MF	BRA	Ezequiel
—	MF	BRA	Lima
—	MF	BRA	Mengálvio
—	MF	BRA	Zito
—	FW	BRA	Cabralzinho
—	FW	BRA	Coutinho
—	FW	BRA	Bé
—	FW	BRA	Didi
—	FW	BRA	Dorval
—	FW	BRA	Luiz Cláudio
—	FW	BRA	Nenê
—	FW	BRA	Osvaldo
—	FW	BRA	Pagão
—	FW	BRA	Pelé
—	FW	BRA	Pepe
—	FW	BRA	Tite
—	FW	BRA	Toninho Guerreiro (Note: Arrived in 1963 but played in the 1962 Taça Brasil)
—	FW	BRA	Zoca

=== Statistics ===
==== Appearances and goals ====
Pos.	Nat	Name	Taça Brasil		Campeonato Paulista		Copa Libertadores		Intercontinental Cup		Taça Estado de São Paulo		Friendlies		Total	
Pos.	Nat	Name	Apps	Goals	Apps	Goals	Apps	Goals	Apps	Goals	Apps	Goals	Apps	Goals	Apps	Goals
GK	(Brazil)	Carlindo	0	0	0	0	0	0	0	0	0+1	0	1+1	0	3	0
GK	(Brazil)	Gilmar	5	0	24	0	5	0	2	0	0	0	4+6	0	46	0
GK	(Brazil)	Laércio	0	0	5+4	0	4	0	0	0	6	0	16+1	0	36	0
GK	(Brazil)	Rosan	0	0	0	0	0	0	0	0	0	0	1	0	1	0
GK	(Brazil)	Silas	0	0	1	0	0+1	0	0	0	5	0	3+2	0	12	0
DF	(Brazil)	Calvet	4	0	25	0	8	0	2	0	3	0	15	0	57	0
DF	(Brazil)	Dalmo	5	0	21	0	5	0	2	0	6+1	1	12	1	52	2
DF	(Brazil)	Décio Brito	0	0	2	0	0	0	0	0	7+1	0	13+1	1	24	1
DF	(Brazil)	Figueiró	0	0	1	0	0	0	0	0	0	0	0+2	0	3	0
DF	(Brazil)	Fioti	0	0	0	0	0	0	0	0	0+4	0	0+3	0	7	0
DF	(Brazil)	Formiga	0	0	1	0	1	0	0	0	8	0	8+5	0	23	0
DF	(Brazil)	Getúlio	0	0	0	0	4	0	0	0	10+1	0	6+9	0	30	0
DF	(Brazil)	Helmiton	2	0	2	0	0	0	0	0	0	0	0	0	4	0
DF	(Brazil)	Ismael	0	0	7	0	0	0	0	0	0	0	0	0	7	0
DF	(Brazil)	João Carlos	0+1	0	1	0	0	0	0	0	0	0	0+1	0	3	0
DF	(Brazil)	Maneco	0	0	2	0	0	0	0	0	0	0	0	0	2	0
DF	(Brazil)	Mauro Ramos	5	0	23	0	5	0	2	0	0	0	8	0	43	0
DF	(Brazil)	Olavo	1	0	11	0	4	0	1	0	11	0	18+2	1	48	1
DF	(Brazil)	Zé Carlos	0	0	13	0	1	0	0	0	0	0	3+5	0	22	0
MF	(Brazil)	Ezequiel	0	0	0	0	0	0	0	0	0	0	1	0	1	0
MF	(Brazil)	Lima	3	0	28	4	9	2	2	0	11	5	23+1	2	77	13
MF	(Brazil)	Mengálvio	5	0	13	0	9	2	1	0	0	0	12+5	2	45	4
MF	(Brazil)	Zito	4	0	26	3	8	2	2	0	0	0	15	4	55	9
FW	(Brazil)	Bé	0	0	2	0	0	0	0	0	2+1	0	4+2	0	11	0
FW	(Brazil)	Bira (Note: On "trial" during the match against Ituveravense)	0	0	0	0	0	0	0	0	0	0	0+1	0	1	0
FW	(Brazil)	Canhoto	0	0	0	0	0	0	0	0	0	0	0+1	0	1	0
FW	(Brazil)	Cabralzinho	0	0	0	0	1	0	0	0	0	0	4+1	1	6	1
FW	(Brazil)	Coutinho	5	7	22	32	5+1	6	2	2	0	0	16+1	18	52	65
FW	(Brazil)	Didi	0	0	0	0	0	0	0	0	0+3	0	1+3	0	7	0
FW	(Brazil)	Dorval	5	2	28	9	9	4	2	0	11	4	20+1	8	76	27
FW	(Brazil)	Luiz Cláudio	0	0	1	0	0	0	0	0	0+2	0	0+1	0	4	0
FW	(Brazil)	Nenê	0	0	2	1	0	0	0	0	7+4	7	4+4	2	21	10
FW	(Brazil)	Osvaldo	0	0	1	0	1+1	0	0	0	11	1	8	3	22	4
FW	(Brazil)	Pagão	0	0	9	5	8	3	0	0	9	2	5+14	7	45	17
FW	(Brazil)	Pelé	5	2	24	37	3+1	4	2	5	0	0	17	16	54	64
FW	(Brazil)	Pepe	5	3	25	9	8	4	2	1	0	0	14	12	54	29
FW	(Brazil)	Tite	1+2	0	8	2	1+3	1	0	0	10	1	12+8	2	45	6
FW	(Brazil)	Toninho Guerreiro	0+1	0	0	0	0	0	0	0	0	0	0	0	1	0
FW	(Brazil)	Zoca	0	0	0	0	0	0	0	0	3+7	2	1+2	1	13	3

Notes

Source: Match reports in Competitive matches

==== Goalscorers ====
Ran	Pos	Nat	Name	Taça Brasil	Paulistão	Libertadores	Intercontinental	Taça SP	Friendlies	Total
1	FW	(Brazil)	Coutinho	7	32	6	2	0	18	65
2	FW	(Brazil)	Pelé	2	37	4	5	0	16	64
3	FW	(Brazil)	Pepe	3	9	4	1	0	12	29
4	FW	(Brazil)	Dorval	2	9	4	0	4	8	27
5	FW	(Brazil)	Pagão	0	5	3	0	2	7	17
6	MF	(Brazil)	Lima	0	4	2	0	5	2	13
7	FW	(Brazil)	Nenê	0	1	0	0	7	3	11
8	MF	(Brazil)	Zito	0	3	2	0	0	4	9
9	FW	(Brazil)	Tite	0	2	1	0	1	2	6
10	MF	(Brazil)	Mengálvio	0	0	2	0	0	2	4
10	FW	(Brazil)	Osvaldo	0	0	0	0	1	3	4
11	FW	(Brazil)	Zoca	0	0	0	0	2	1	3
12	DF	(Brazil)	Dalmo	0	0	0	0	1	0	1
13	DF	(Brazil)	Décio Brito	0	0	0	0	0	1	1
13	DF	(Brazil)	Olavo	0	0	0	0	0	1	1
13	FW	(Brazil)	Cabralzinho	0	0	0	0	0	1	1
Own goals				1	0	1	0	0	1	3
Total				15	102	29	8	23	83	260

Source: Match reports in Competitive matches

== Competitions ==
=== Friendlies ===
==== Matches ====
3 January	Botafogo	3–0	Santos	Rio de Janeiro
	Amarildo 25' (pen.), 49'; China 52'	Report		Stadium: Maracanã; Attendance: 102,348; Referee: Romualdo Arppi Filho

- South American tour

7 January	Barcelona SC (Ecuador)	2–6	(Brazil) Santos	Guayaquil
	Cordero 36'; Lecaro 62' (pen.)	Report	35' Zito; 43' Pepe; 49', 60', 63', 87' Coutinho	Stadium: Isidro Romero Carbo; Attendance: 30,000~; Referee: Boanerges Cavallo

14 January	LDU Quito (Ecuador)	3–6	(Brazil) Santos	Quito
	Gilberto 33'; Garzón 65' (pen.); Rivadeneira 73'	Report	15', 52' (pen.), 56' Pepe; 24', 35', 45' Pelé	Stadium: Olímpico Atahualpa; Attendance: 45,000~; Referee: Bela Rosenfeld

17 January	Alianza Lima (Peru)	1–5	(Brazil) Santos	Lima
	Zegarra 80'	Report	19' Dorval; 32', 39' Coutinho; 43' Tite; 58' Pepe	Stadium: Nacional; Attendance: 25,711; Referee: Carlos Rivero

20 January	Universitario (Peru)	2–5	(Brazil) Santos	Lima
	Márquez 5'; Guzmán 17'	Report	30' Dorval; 35' Coutinho; 66' Pagão; 74' Pelé; 78' Pepe	Stadium: Nacional; Attendance: 23,096; Referee: Alberto Tejada

24 January	Sporting Cristal (Peru)	1–5	(Brazil) Santos	Lima
	Ramírez 85'	Report	13' Coutinho; 33' Pepe; 56' Dorval; 68' Tite; 75' Pelé	Stadium: Nacional; Attendance: 35,000~; Referee: Enrique Montez

27 January	Deportivo Municipal (Peru)	2–3	(Brazil) Santos	Lima
	Drago 48'; Calvet 62' (o.g.); Mosquera (red card)	Report	14' Mengálvio; 68' Coutinho; 85' Dorval; (red card) Olavo	Stadium: Nacional; Attendance: 22,572; Referee: Artur Yamasaki

31 January	Nacional (Uruguay)	2–3	(Brazil) Santos	Montevideo
	Douksas 48'; Décio Brito 70' (o.g.)	Report	43', (red card) 89' Dorval; 64' Pelé; 85' Pagão; (red card) 87' Zito	Stadium: Centenario; Attendance: 35,260; Referee: Juan Carlos Armental

3 February Buenos Aires Tournament	Racing Club (Argentina)	3–8	(Brazil) Santos	Buenos Aires
	Sosa 41'; Cárdenas 49'; Belén 57'	Report	4', 10', 67' Coutinho; 11' Pelé; 40' (o.g.) Jedlinski; 64', 77', 86' Pepe	Stadium: Monumental de Núñez; Referee: Juan Carlos Pradaude

6 February Buenos Aires Tournament	River Plate (Argentina)	2–1	(Brazil) Santos	Buenos Aires
	Onega 16'; Pando 31'	Report	69' Décio Brito	Stadium: Monumental de Núñez; Attendance: 90,000~; Referee: Luis Ventre

9 February	Gimnasia La Plata (Argentina)	2–2	(Brazil) Santos	La Plata
	Cortés 6'; Prado 58'	Report	31' Pepe; 78' Mengálvio	Stadium: El Bosque; Attendance: 25,000~; Referee: Juan Brozzi

14 February	Santos	3–1	Brazil Second XI	Santos
	Pelé 3'; Coutinho 11'; Olavo 81' (pen.)	Report	5' Dirceu	Stadium: Ulrico Mursa; Referee: Romualdo Arppi Filho

18 March	Santos	5–3	Palmeiras	São Paulo
	Pelé 4', 62'; Zito 6', 80'; Dorval 18'	Report	19' Chinesinho; 38' Vavá; 65' Zequinha	Stadium: Pacaembu; Referee: Olten Ayres de Abreu

28 March	Santos	2–3	Portuguesa	Santos
	Osvaldo 22'; Pagão 39'	Report	61' Ocimar; 72' Melão; 78' Sílvio	Stadium: Vila Belmiro; Referee: João Etzel Filho

31 March	Portuguesa	3–3	Santos	São Paulo
	Melão 20'; Tite 48' (o.g.); Servílio 73'	Report	17', 86' Pagão; 42' Dorval	Stadium: Canindé; Referee: Anacleto Pietrobon

22 April	Ituveravense	2–5	Santos	Ituverava
	Sudaco 52', (pen.)	Report	2', 81' Nenê; 8' Osvaldo; 28' Zoca (pen.) Dalmo	Stadium: Orlando Seixas Rego; Referee: Henrique Ropeio

10 May	Atlético Mineiro	1–2	Santos	Belo Horizonte
	Jaburu 52'	Report	37' Pagão; 88' Dorval	Stadium: Independência; Referee: João Etzel Filho

20 May	São Bento	3–3	Santos	Sorocaba
	Raimundinho; Nestor,	Report	Lima; Osvaldo; Cabralzinho	Stadium: Estádio da Rua Coronel Padilha; Referee: Manoel Ramos

- Tournoi de Paris

26 June Semifinal	Santos (Brazil)	0–1	(Socialist Federal Republic of Yugoslavia) Red Star	Paris
		Report	26' Škrbić	Stadium: Parc des Princes; Attendance: 18,000~; Referee: Tricot

28 June Third place match	Racing Club Paris (France)	3–2	(Brazil) Santos	Paris
	Heutte 21'; Van Sam 71'; Magny 90'	Report	43' Nenê; 67' Zito	Stadium: Parc des Princes; Referee: Fauchex

- European tour

17 October	Racing Club Paris (France)	2–5	(Brazil) Santos	Paris
	Van Sam; Milutinović	Report	Pepe, Pelé; Lima; Pagão	Stadium: Parc des Princes; Attendance: 35,083; Referee: Bois

20 October	Hamburger SV (West Germany)	3–3	(Brazil) Santos	Hamburg
	Reuter, Seeler	Report	, Pelé; Coutinho	Stadium: Volksparkstadion; Attendance: 72,000~; Referee: Hornslien

22 October	Sheffield Wednesday (England)	2–4	(Brazil) Santos	Sheffield
	Griffin; Layne	Report	,, Coutinho; Pelé	Stadium: Hillsborough; Attendance: 65,000~; Referee: Michel Kitabdjian

10 December	Santos (Brazil)	2–1	Soviet Union	São Paulo
	Coutinho 31'; Pelé 78'	Report	12' Valery Voronin	Stadium: Pacaembu; Referee: João Etzel Filho

=== Copa Libertadores ===
==== Group stage ====
Group 1
Team	Pld	W	D	L	GF	GA	GD	Pts
(Brazil) Santos	4	3	1	0	20	6	14	7
(Paraguay) Cerro Porteño	4	1	1	2	6	14	-8	3
(Bolivia) Deportivo Municipal	4	1	0	3	8	14	-6	2

18 February	Deportivo Municipal (Bolivia)	3–4	(Brazil) Santos	La Paz
	Aguilera 16'; Torres 59'; Ruiz Díaz 62'	Report	42' Lima; 57' Mengálvio; 78' Pagão; 80' Tite	Stadium: Estadio Hernando Siles; Attendance: 38,000~; Referee: (Brazil) Olten Ayres de Abreu

21 February	Santos (Brazil)	6–1	(Bolivia) Deportivo Municipal	Santos
	Pepe 12'; Pagão 14', 47'; Dorval 24', 75'; Coutinho 58'	Report	53' Aguilera	Stadium: Vila Belmiro; Attendance: 11,978; Referee: (Peru) Alberto Tejada Burga

25 February	Cerro Porteño (Paraguay)	1–1	(Brazil) Santos	Asunción
	Cabrera 73'	Report	56' Dorval	Stadium: Defensores del Chaco; Attendance: 15,871; Referee: (Argentina) Luis Antonio Ventre

28 February	Santos (Brazil)	9–1	(Paraguay) Cerro Porteño	Santos
	Pepe 7', 86' (pen.), 72'; Coutinho 35', 54', 62'; Pelé 59', 89'; Zito 80'	Report	19' Insfrán	Stadium: Vila Belmiro; Attendance: 10,547; Referee: (Argentina) José Luis Praddaude

==== Semifinals ====
8 July First leg	Universidad Católica (Chile)	1–1	(Brazil) Santos	Santiago
	Nawacki 75'; Olivares (red card) 88'	Report	59' Lima	Stadium: Estadio Nacional; Attendance: 27,236; Referee: (Peru) Alberto Tejada Burga

12 July Second leg	Santos (Brazil)	1–0	(Chile) Universidad Católica	Santos
	Zito 37'	Report		Stadium: Estádio Vila Belmiro; Attendance: 10,511; Referee: (Peru) Alberto Tejada Burga

==== Finals ====
28 July First leg	Peñarol (Uruguay)	1–2	(Brazil) Santos	Montevideo
	Spencer 75'	Report	5', 43' Coutinho	Stadium: Estadio Centenario; Attendance: 50,085; Referee: (Chile) Carlos Robles y Robles

2 August Second leg	Santos (Brazil)	2–3 (Note: Only 51 minutes of the second leg was considered official by CONMEBOL. The remaining 39 minutes was a friendly match. In the friendly time (65th minute), Pagão tied the game at three goals a-piece, but the official score remained 2–3.)	(Uruguay) Peñarol	Santos
	Dorval 18'; Mengálvio 35'	Report	14', 49' Spencer; 50' Sasía	Stadium: Estádio Vila Belmiro; Attendance: 22,000~; Referee: (Chile) Carlos Robles y Robles

30 August Tie-break	Santos (Brazil)	3–0	(Uruguay) Peñarol	Buenos Aires
	Caetano 11' (o.g.); Pelé 48', 89'	Report		Stadium: Estadio Monumental; Attendance: 45,980; Referee: (Netherlands) Leo Horn

=== Taça Estado de São Paulo ===
==== First round ====
15 April First leg	Santos	3–1	Ponte Preta	Santos
	Pagão 8'; Dorval 21'; Nenê 38'	Report	81' Nivaldo	Stadium: Vila Belmiro; Referee: João Etzel Filho

18 April Second leg	Ponte Preta	3–3	Santos	Campinas
	Romeiro 13', 75', (red card) 89'; Jair 86'	Report	43' (pen.) Dalmo; 58', 90' Nenê	Stadium: Moisés Lucarelli; Referee: Anacleto Pietrobom

==== Round of 16 ====
6 May First leg	Corinthians-PP	2–1	Santos	Presidente Prudente
	Paulinho 10', 33'	Report	37' Zoca	Stadium: Parque São Jorge; Referee: Olten Aires de Abreu

13 May Second leg	Santos	3–1	Corinthians-PP	Santos
	Tite 17'; Lima 29'; Dorval 54'	Report	43' Plínio	Stadium: Vila Belmiro; Referee: Olten Aires de Abreu

==== Quarterfinals ====
23 May First leg	Portuguesa	1–2	Santos	São Paulo
	Nardo 4'	Report	42' Osvaldo; 73' Nenê	Stadium: Canindé; Referee: Anacleto Pietrobon

26 May Second leg	Santos	2–0	Portuguesa	Santos
	Pagão 23'; Lima 79'	Report		Stadium: Vila Belmiro; Referee: Olten Aires de Abreu

==== Semifinals ====
7 June First leg	Santos	2–1	Comercial-RP	Santos
	Nenê 12'; Dorval 62'	Report	14' Carlos César	Stadium: Vila Belmiro; Referee: Olten Aires de Abreu

10 June Second leg	Comercial-RP	1–0 (0–0 a.e.t)	Santos	Ribeirão Preto
	Carlos César 42'	Report		Stadium: Antonio Costa Coelho; Referee: Benedito Francisco
Note: As the match ended 0–0 at extra time, a third match was needed

13 June Third leg	Santos	2–2 (1–0 a.e.t)	Comercial-RP	Santos
	Lima 74', 83'; Nenê 114'	Report	15' Paulinho; 80' Carlos César	Stadium: Vila Belmiro; Referee: Catão Montez Junior

==== Finals ====
16 June First leg	Corinthians	3–1	Santos	São Paulo
	Calvet 17' (o.g.); Manoelzinho 54'; Cássio 84' (pen.)	Report	75' Nenê	Stadium: Parque São Jorge; Referee: Anacleto Pietrobon

21 June Second leg	Santos	3–3	Corinthians	Santos
	Lima 20'; Dorval 49'; Zoca 77'	Report	9' Silva Batuta; 44' Rafael; 90+4' Manoelzinho	Stadium: Vila Belmiro; Attendance: 21,000~; Referee: Anacleto Pietrobon (Fattore Euclides Rosa)

=== Campeonato Paulista ===
#	Team	Pld	W	D	L	GF	GA	GD	Pts
1	Santos (C)	30	23	5	2	102	31	71	51
2	São Paulo	30	19	5	6	66	36	30	43
3	Corinthians	30	18	7	5	77	37	40	43
4	Palmeiras	30	14	6	10	52	44	8	34
5	Portuguesa	30	12	9	9	42	43	-1	33

==== Matches ====
22 July 1	Santos	5–0	Esportiva Guaratinguetá	Santos
	Coutinho 15', 51', 54'; Pepe 27'; Pagão 62'	Report		Stadium: Vila Belmiro; Attendance: 2,800~; Referee: Eunápio de Queiroz

25 July 2	Santos	5–1	XV de Piracicaba	Santos
	Coutinho 6', 26', 32', 86', 89'	Report	84' Ubiracy	Stadium: Vila Belmiro; Attendance: 4,400~; Referee: Helio Gasparini

5 August 3	Prudentina	0–2	Santos	Presidente Prudente
		Report	3' Pelé; 24' Pagão	Stadium: Félix Ribeiro Marcondes; Referee: Anacleto Pietrobom

8 August 4	Juventus	0–2	Santos	São Paulo
		Report	60' Pagão; 87' Tite	Stadium: Pacaembu; Referee: Eunápio de Queiroz

12 August 5	Palmeiras	2–4	Santos	São Paulo
	Alencar 6', 65'	Report	25' Pepe; 52' Coutinho; 61' Pelé; 89' Dorval	Stadium: Pacaembu; Attendance: 48,414; Referee: Olten Aires de Abreu

15 August 6	Taubaté	0–1	Santos	Taubaté
		Report	60' Tite	Stadium: Monsenhor Silva Bastos; Referee: Stefan Walter Glanz

19 August 7	Jabaquara	1–5	Santos	Santos
	Alcides 44'	Report	20', 76', 82' Pelé; 25' (pen.) Pepe; 58' Coutinho	Stadium: Vila Belmiro; Attendance: 7,862; Referee: Anacleto Pietrobom

26 August 8	Guarani	1–1	Santos	Campinas
	Osvaldo 84'	Report	43' Pelé	Stadium: Brinco de Ouro da Princesa; Attendance: 25,000~; Referee: João Etzel Filho

2 September 9	Santos	3–3	São Paulo	Santos
	Pelé 25', 32'; Dorval 40'	Report	1', 22' Dias; 85' Sabino	Stadium: Vila Belmiro; Attendance: 14,621; Referee: Eunápio de Queiróz

5 September 10	Santos	5–2	Botafogo	Santos
	Coutinho 10', 77'; Dorval 66'; Pelé 70', 86'	Report	60' (o.g.) Mauro; 80' Nair	Stadium: Vila Belmiro; Attendance: 9,120; Referee: Anacleto Pietrobom

15 September 11	Santos	7–2	Ferroviária	Santos
	Lima 10'; Pepe 18'; Pelé 20', 25', 75', 83'; Coutinho 81'	Report	12' (o.g.) Calvet; 61' Parada; (red card) Bazzani	Stadium: Vila Belmiro; Attendance: 11,557; Referee: Eunápio de Queiroz

23 September 12	Santos	5–2	Corinthians	Santos
	Lima 5'; Pelé 27'; Coutinho 38', 49'; Zito 53'	Report	20' Bataglia; 79' Ferreirinha	Stadium: Vila Belmiro; Referee: Anacleto Pietrobom

26 September 13	Santos	4–0	Noroeste	Santos
	Pelé 21' 75'; Zito 39'; Coutinho 89'	Report		Stadium: Vila Belmiro; Referee: Fatore Euclides Rosa

30 September 14	Comercial-RP	1–3	Santos	Ribeirão Preto
	Mauro 13' (o.g.)	Report	49' Pelé; 66', 74' Coutinho	Stadium: Antonio Costa Coelho; Referee: Eunápio de Queiroz

6 October 15	Portuguesa	3–2	Santos	São Paulo
	Morais 23'; Sílvio 53', 82'	Report	6' Dorval; 20' Pelé	Stadium: Pacaembu; Referee: Anacleto Pietrobom

27 October 16	Santos	3–0	Taubaté	Santos
	Dorval 13'; Pelé 33'; Pepe 77'	Report		Stadium: Vila Belmiro; Attendance: 7,544; Referee: Helio Gasparini

31 October 17	Santos	5–0	Guarani	Santos
	Pelé 22', 50', 86'; Lima 44'; Pepe 70'	Report		Stadium: Vila Belmiro; Attendance: 9,558; Referee: João Etzel Filho

4 November 18	Corinthians	1–2	Santos	São Paulo
	Cássio 61'	Report	66' Coutinho; 80' Pelé	Stadium: Parque São Jorge; Attendance: 27,384; Referee: Airton Vieira de Moraes

7 November 19	Santos	3–0	Juventus	Santos
	Pelé 7'; Coutinho 35', 70'	Report		Stadium: Vila Belmiro; Attendance: 4,137; Referee: Anacleto Pietrobom

11 November 20	Noroeste	1–1	Santos	Bauru
	Zacarias 22'	Report	29' Coutinho	Stadium: Ubaldo Medeiros; Attendance: 17,292; Referee: Stefan Walter Glanz

14 November 21	Santos	3–0	Palmeiras	Santos
	Coutinho 13', 70'; Pelé 78'	Report		Stadium: Vila Belmiro; Attendance: 18,856; Referee: Anacleto Pietrobom

18 November 22	XV de Piracicaba	1–1	Santos	Piracicaba
	Nilo 33'	Report	3' Coutinho	Stadium: Roberto Gomes Pedrosa; Attendance: 7,800~; Referee: Eunápio de Queiroz

21 November 23	Santos	4–1	Portuguesa	Santos
	Coutinho 7', 86'; Pelé 63', 72'	Report	30' Servílio	Stadium: Vila Belmiro; Attendance: 8,216; Referee: Anacleto Pietrobom

25 November 24	Ferroviária	1–1	Santos	Araraquara
	Geraldo 73'	Report	41' Zito; (red card) Coutinho	Stadium: Fonte Luminosa; Attendance: 15,000~; Referee: Airton Vieira de Moraes

28 November 25	Santos	6–2	Comercial-RP	Santos
	Coutinho 5', 47', 67', 73'; Pelé 42', 85'	Report	63', 87' Célio	Stadium: Vila Belmiro; Attendance: 8,557; Referee: João Etzel Filho

2 December 26	Santos	8–2	Jabaquara	Santos
	Pelé 2', 21', 47', 66'; Lima 25'; Dorval 60', 68'; Pepe 66'	Report	40' Cabrita; 61' Rubens Salles	Stadium: Vila Belmiro; Attendance: 5,026; Referee: Romualdo Arppi Filho

5 December 27	São Paulo	2–5	Santos	São Paulo
	Dias 15'; Benê 16'	Report	38' Coutinho; 43', 47' Dorval; 60' Pepe; 88' Pelé	Stadium: Pacaembu; Attendance: 49,500~; Referee: Anacleto Pietrobom

9 December 28	Esportiva Guaratinguetá	2–1	Santos	Guaratinguetá
	Gil 57'; Zezé 87'	Report	37' Nenê	Stadium: Dr. Benedito Meirelles; Attendance: 1,164; Referee: Airton Vieira de Moraes

12 December 29	Botafogo	0–1	Santos	Ribeirão Preto
		Report	49' Pagão	Stadium: Luís Pereira; Referee: Fatore Euclides Rosa

15 December 30	Santos	4–0	Prudentina	Santos
	Pagão 9'; Pepe 65'; Pelé 81', 88'	Report		Stadium: Vila Belmiro; Referee: Manoel Joaquim Ramos

=== Intercontinental Cup ===
==== Finals ====
19 September First leg	Santos (Brazil)	3–2	(Portugal) Benfica	Rio de Janeiro
	Pelé 31', 86'; Coutinho 64'	Report	59', 87' Santana	Stadium: Maracanã; Attendance: 84,459; Referee: (Paraguay) Rubén Cabrera

11 October Second leg	Benfica (Portugal)	2–5	(Brazil) Santos	Lisbon
	Eusébio 86'; Simões 89'	Report	17', 27', 65' Pelé; 48' Coutinho; 77' Pepe	Stadium: Estádio da Luz; Attendance: 73,000; Referee: (France) Pierre Schwinte

=== Taça Brasil ===
==== Results summary ====
Overall								Home						Away					
Pld	W	D	L	GF	GA	GD	Pts	W	D	L	GF	GA	GD	W	D	L	GF	GA	GD
5	3	1	1	15	7	+8	7	2	0	0	8	3	+5	1	1	1	7	4	+3

==== Semifinals ====
12 January 1963 First leg	Sport Recife	1–1	Santos	Recife
	Djalma 37', (red card)	Report	81' Coutinho; (red card) Zito	Stadium: Ilha do Retiro; Attendance: 20,000~; Referee: Armando Marques

16 January 1963 Second leg	Santos	4–0	Sport Recife	São Paulo
	Coutinho 9', 15', 23', 40'	Report		Stadium: Pacaembu; Referee: Armando Marques

==== Finals ====
19 March 1963 First leg	Santos	4–3	Botafogo	São Paulo
	Pepe 33', 73'; Coutinho 47'; Dorval 56'	Report	13' Quarentinha; 66' Amoroso; 89' Amarildo	Stadium: Pacaembu; Attendance: 29,000~; Referee: Armando Marques

31 March 1963 Second leg	Botafogo	3–1	Santos	Rio de Janeiro
	Édison 31'; Quarentinha 50'; Amarildo 70'	Report	87' (o.g.) Rildo	Stadium: Maracanã; Attendance: 102,260; Referee: Catão Montez Júnior
Note: The match also served as the last round of the 1963 Torneio Rio-São Paulo, where Santos was already mathematically champions

2 April 1963 Tie-break	Botafogo	0–5	Santos	Rio de Janeiro
		Report	24' Dorval; 39' Pepe; 54' Coutinho; 75', 80' Pelé	Stadium: Maracanã; Attendance: 70,324; Referee: Eunápio Gouvêa de Queiroz
