= 1963 Copa Libertadores finals =

- Event: 1963 Copa Libertadores
Santos	Boca Juniors
(Brazil)	(Argentina)
5	3
- Santos won 4-0 on points.

First leg
Santos	Boca Juniors
3	2
- Date: September 4, 1963
- Venue: Estádio do Maracanã, Rio de Janeiro
- Referee: Marcel Albert Bois (France)
- Attendance: 100,000

Second leg
Boca Juniors	Santos
1	2
- Date: September 11, 1963
- Venue: Boca Juniors, Buenos Aires
- Referee: Marcel Albert Bois (France)
- Attendance: 50,000

The 1963 Copa Libertadores finals was a football series between Santos and Boca Juniors on September 4 and September 11 of this same year. It was the fourth final of South America's most prestigious football competition, the Copa de Campeones (known in the modern era as "Copa Libertadores"). Defending champions Santos were appearing in their second consecutive final, whereas Boca Juniors were seeking to win the competition for the first time. Both finalists reached the final with relative ease as they crushed Botafogo and Peñarol.

Boca Juniors needed to win two group series to reach the finals. The Xeneixes progressed past the First round after winning three matches and losing only one, including a legendary 5-3 match against Olimpia which would repeat itself 26 editions later. As the defending champions, Santos begin their participation in the semifinals.

== Qualified teams ==
Team	Previous finals appearances (bold indicates winners)
(Brazil) Santos	**1962**
(Argentina) Boca Juniors	None

== Stadiums ==
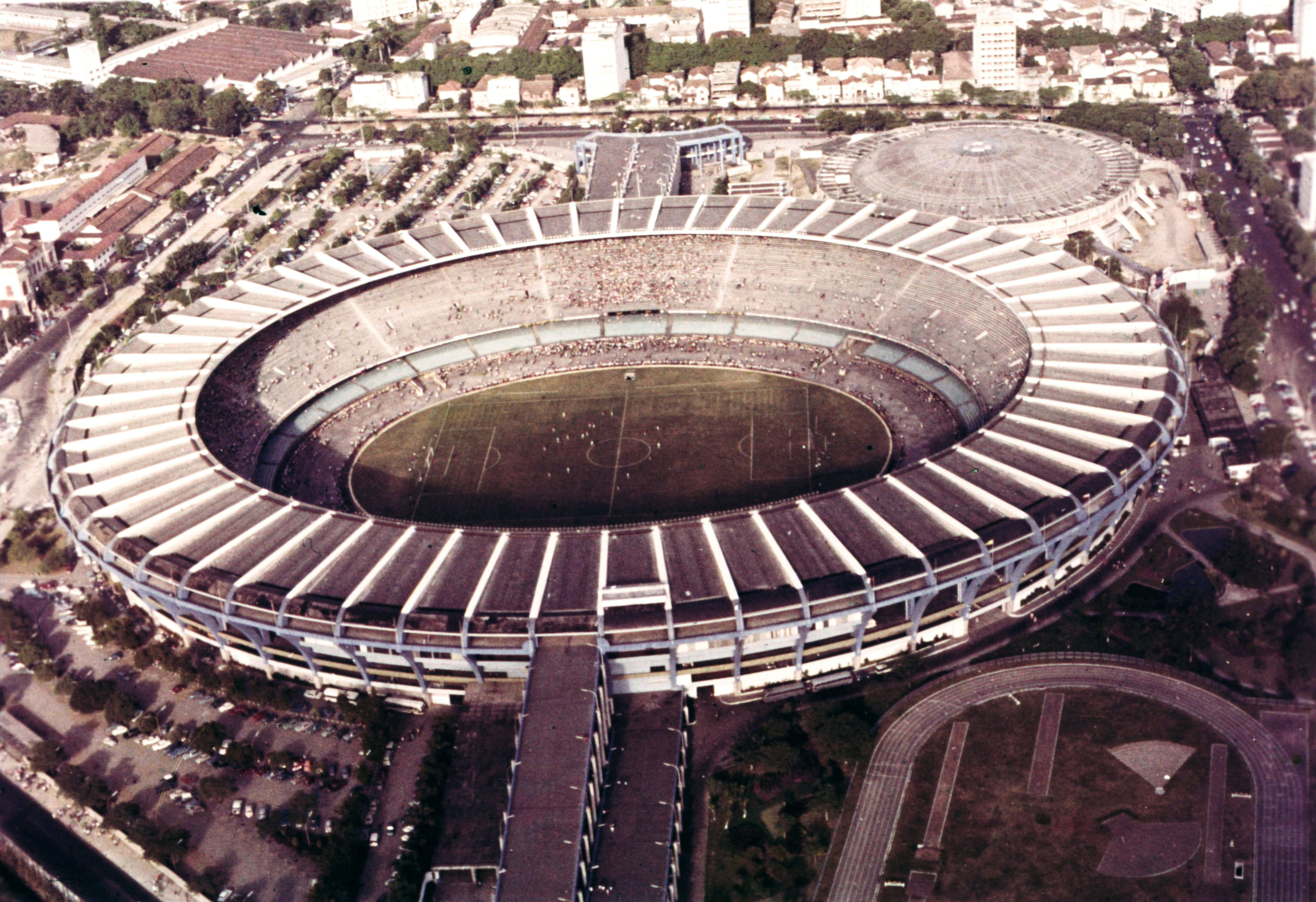
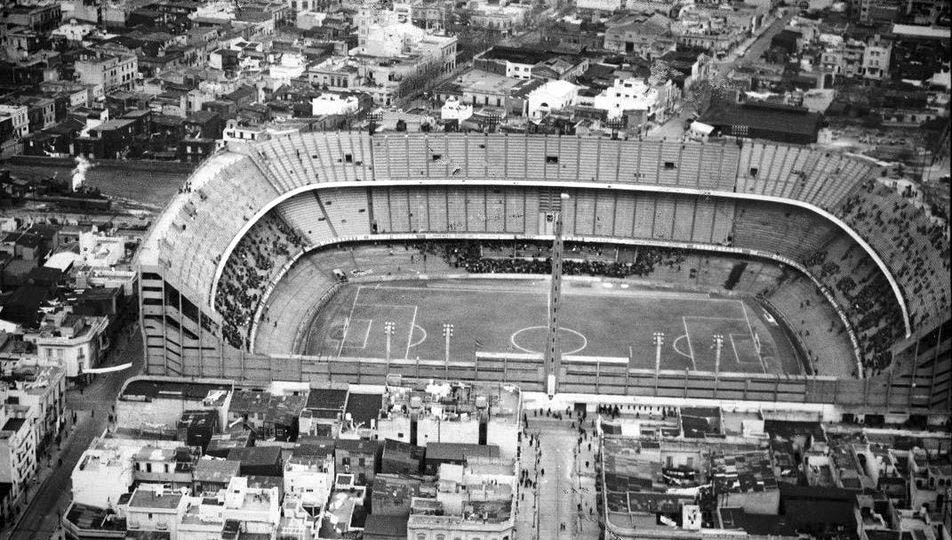
Maracanã Stadium (left) and La Bombonera, venues for the finals

== Finals ==
Team	Pld	W	D	L	GF	GA	GD	Pts
(Brazil) Santos	2	2	0	0	5	3	+2	**4**
(Argentina) Boca Juniors	2	0	0	2	3	5	−2	**0**

=== First leg ===
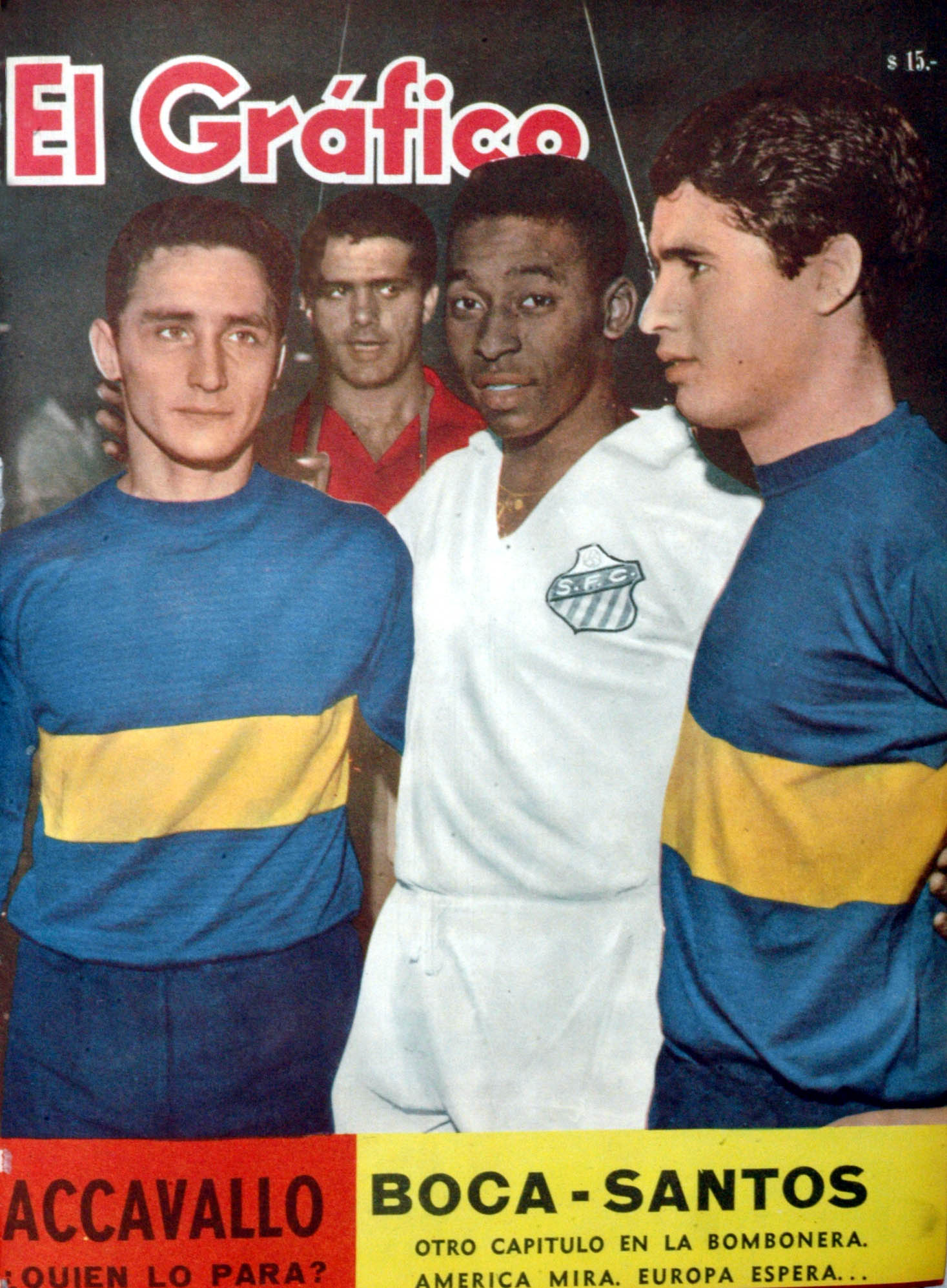
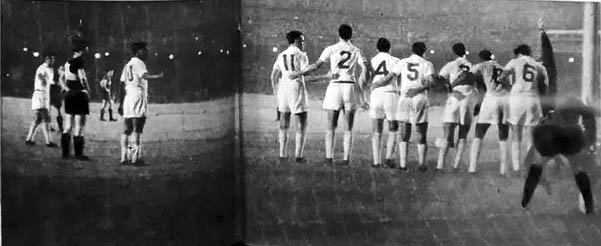
Two moments of the first match held in Maracana Stadium
1963 Copa Libertadores finals
September 3, 1963
First leg

Santos (Brazil)	3–2	(Argentina) Boca Juniors
Coutinho 2', 21'; Lima 28'		Sanfilippo 43', 89'

Estádio do Maracanã, Rio de Janeiro
Attendance: 63,376
Referee: Marcel Albert Bois (France)

**Santos**	**Boca Juniors**

GK	1	(Brazil) Gilmar
DF	2	(Brazil) Mauro
DF	3	(Brazil) Geraldino
DF	4	(Brazil) Dalmo
MF	5	(Brazil) Zito
DF	6	(Brazil) Calvet
MF	7	(Brazil) Dorval
MF	8	(Brazil) Lima
FW	9	(Brazil) Coutinho
FW	10	(Brazil) Pelé
FW	11	(Brazil) Pepe
Manager:
(Brazil) Lula

GK	1	(Argentina) Néstor Errea
DF	2	(Argentina) Rubén Magdalena
DF	3	(Argentina) Silvio Marzolini	Substituted off
DF	4	(Argentina) Carmelo Simeone
MF	5	(Argentina) Antonio Rattín
MF	6	(Uruguay) Alcides Silveira
MF	7	(Argentina) Ernesto Grillo
FW	8	(Argentina) Angel Clemente Rojas
FW	9	(Argentina) Norberto Menéndez
FW	10	(Argentina) José Sanfilippo
FW	11	(Argentina) Alberto Mario González
Substitutions:
DF		(Brazil) Orlando	Substituted on
Manager:
(Argentina) José D'Amico

=== Second leg ===
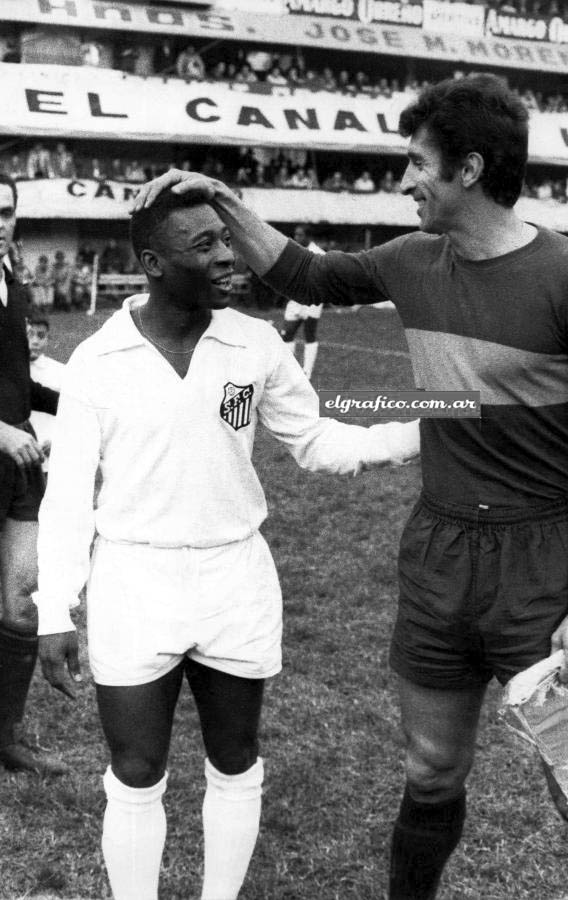
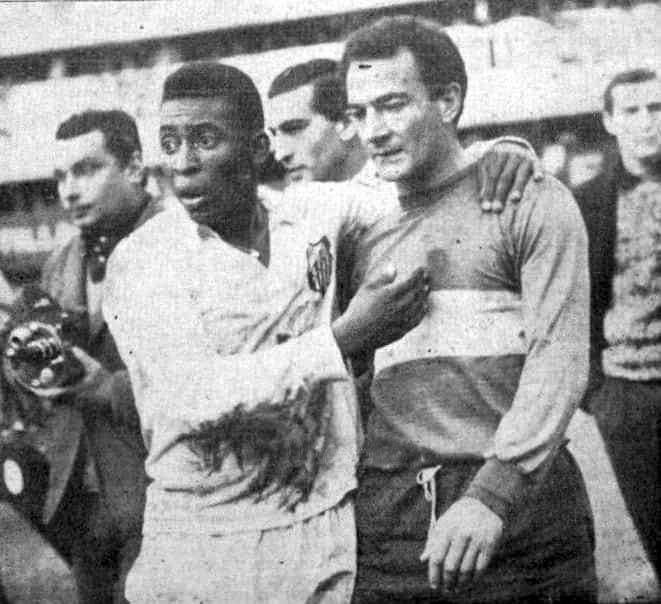
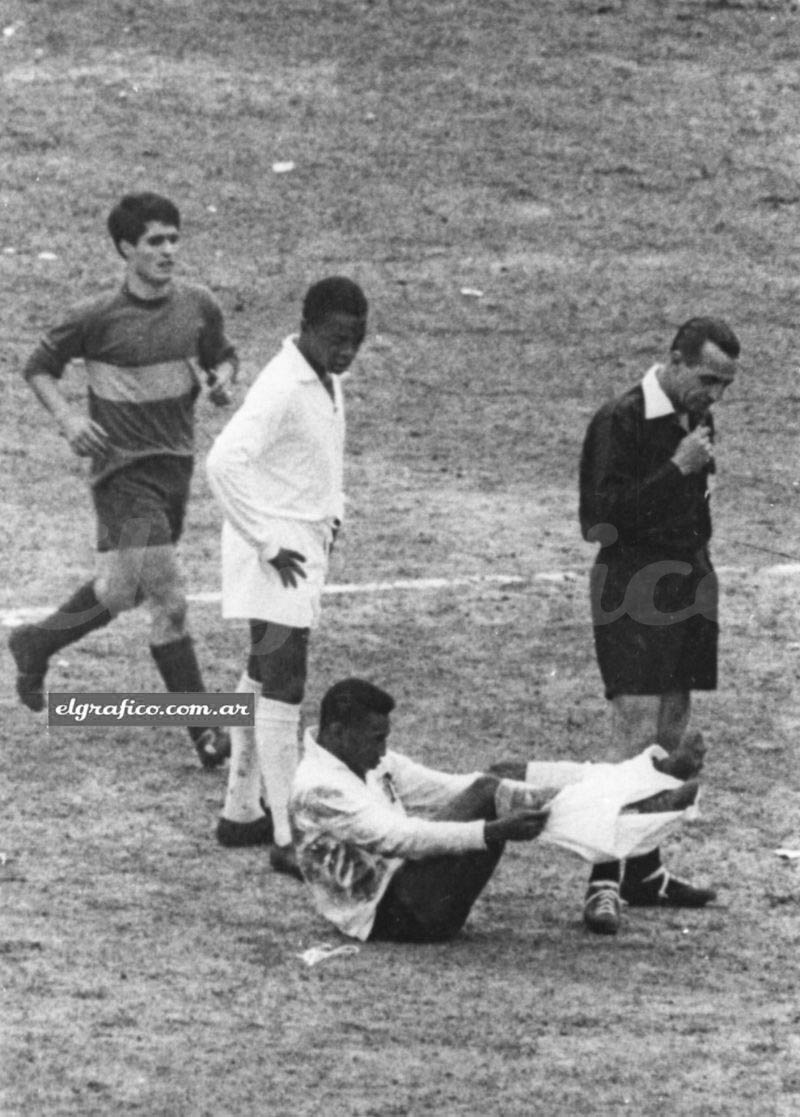
Some moments of the match at La Bombonera with Pelé and Boca Juniors players
September 11, 1963
Second leg

Boca Juniors (Argentina)	1–2	(Brazil) Santos
Sanfilippo 46'		Coutinho 50'; Pelé 82'

La Bombonera, Buenos Aires
Attendance: 50,000
Referee: Marcel Albert Bois (France)

**Boca Juniors**	**Santos**

GK	1	(Argentina) Néstor Errea
DF	2	(Argentina) Magdalena
DF	3	(Brazil) Orlando
DF	4	(Argentina) Carmelo Simeone
MF	5	(Argentina) Antonio Rattín
MF	6	(Uruguay) Alcides Silveira
MF	7	(Argentina) Ernesto Grillo
FW	8	(Argentina) Ángel C. Rojas
FW	9	(Argentina) Norberto Menéndez
FW	10	(Argentina) José Sanfilippo
FW	11	(Argentina) Alberto González
Manager:
(Argentina) José D'Amico

GK	1	(Brazil) Gilmar
DF	2	(Brazil) Mauro
DF	3	(Brazil) Geraldino
DF	4	(Brazil) Dalmo
MF	5	(Brazil) Zito
DF	6	(Brazil) Calvet
MF	7	(Brazil) Dorval
MF	8	(Brazil) Lima
FW	9	(Brazil) Coutinho
FW	10	(Brazil) Pelé
FW	11	(Brazil) Pepe
Manager:
(Brazil) Lula
