= 1964 São Paulo FC season =

São Paulo
1964 season
- Chairman: (Brazil) Laudo Natel
- Manager: (Brazil) Osvaldo Brandão (Brazil) Otto Vieira (Argentina) José Poy
- Stadium: Estádio Municipal Paulo Machado de Carvalho (Pacaembu)

The 1964 football season was São Paulo's 35th season since club's existence.

== Statistics ==
=== Overall ===
Games played	63 (9 Torneio Rio-São Paulo, 30 Campeonato Paulista, 24 Friendly match)
Games won	29 (1 Torneio Rio-São Paulo, 12 Campeonato Paulista, 16 Friendly match)
Games drawn	16 (2 Torneio Rio-São Paulo, 9 Campeonato Paulista, 5 Friendly match)
Games lost	18 (6 Torneio Rio-São Paulo, 9 Campeonato Paulista, 3 Friendly match)
Goals scored	115
Goals conceded	86
Goal difference	+29
Best result	6–0 (H) v XV de Piracicaba - Campeonato Paulista - 1964.12.02
Worst result	1–5 (A) v Santos - Campeonato Paulista - 1964.07.19
Most appearances	
Top scorer	

Source: São Paulo FC

== Friendlies ==
February 2 National	Mairiporã	1–8	São Paulo	Mairiporã
	Goal		Goal	Stadium: Estádio Antônio de Oliveira

February 16 National	União Barbarense	2–6	São Paulo	Santa Bárbara d'Oeste
	Goal		Goal	Stadium: Estádio Antônio Lins Ribeiro Guimarães

February 27 National	Ponte Preta	1–3	São Paulo	Campinas
	Goal		Goal	Stadium: Estádio Moisés Lucarelli

May 1 National	Grêmio	2–3	São Paulo	Blumenau
	Goal		Goal

May 9 International	VTJ Dukla Praha (Czechoslovakia)	0–2	(Brazil) São Paulo	Prague
			Goal

May 14 International	Borussia Dortmund (West Germany)	1–3	(Brazil) São Paulo	Dortmund
	Goal		Goal	Stadium: Rote Erde

May 20 International	Nord-Pas-de-Calais XI (France)	1–3	(Brazil) São Paulo	Lens
	Goal		Goal

May 22 International	Anderlecht (Belgium)	0–0	(Brazil) São Paulo	Brussels

May 26 International	Nîmes (France)	0–3	(Brazil) São Paulo	Nîmes
			Goal

May 30 International	Karlsruher SC (West Germany)	0–2	(Brazil) São Paulo	Karlsruhe
			Goal	Stadium: Wildparkstadion

June 3 International	Valenciennes (France)	1–1	(Brazil) São Paulo	Valenciennes
	Goal		Goal

June 13 International	Bordeaux (France)	1–2	(Brazil) São Paulo	Bordeaux
	Goal		Goal

June 16 International	MSV Duisburg (West Germany)	1–1	(Brazil) São Paulo	Duisburg
	Goal		Goal

June 24 International	Milan (Italy)	0–1	(Brazil) São Paulo	Milan
			Goal	Stadium: San Siro

September 15 National	Campo Grande XI	0–5	São Paulo	Campo Grande
			Goal	Stadium: Estádio Pedro Pedrossian

September 17 Taça S. Morumbi	Corumbaense	2–6	São Paulo	Corumbá
	Goal		Goal

November 25 National	Bancária	1–4	São Paulo	Fernandópolis
	Goal		Goal

=== I Torneo Internacional de El Salvador ===
January 16 International	Alianza (El Salvador)	1–5	(Brazil) São Paulo	San Salvador
	Goal		Goal	Stadium: Estadio Nacional Flor Blanca

January 19 International	Slovan Bratislava (Czechoslovakia)	1–2	(Brazil) São Paulo	San Salvador
	Goal		Goal	Stadium: Estadio Nacional Flor Blanca

=== Torneo Internacional Ciudad de Mexico ===
January 21 International	Guadalajara (Mexico)	1–1	(Brazil) São Paulo	Mexico City
	Goal		Goal	Stadium: Estadio Olímpico Universitario

January 30 International	Necaxa (Mexico)	1–0	(Brazil) São Paulo	Mexico City
	Goal			Stadium: Estadio Olímpico Universitario

February 2 International	Partizan Belgrade (Socialist Federal Republic of Yugoslavia)	3–1	(Brazil) São Paulo	Mexico City
	Goal		Goal	Stadium: Estadio Olímpico Universitario

February 6 International	América (Mexico)	1–4	(Brazil) São Paulo	Mexico City
	Goal		Goal	Stadium: Estadio Olímpico Universitario

February 13 International	Moscow Clubs (Soviet Union)	4–0	(Brazil) São Paulo	Mexico City
	Goal			Stadium: Estadio Olímpico Universitario

=== II Torneo Internacional de El Salvador ===
February 16 International	Nacional (Uruguay)	1–1	(Brazil) São Paulo	San Salvador
	Goal		Goal	Stadium: Estadio Nacional Flor Blanca

February 23 International	Racing (Argentina)	3–2	(Brazil) São Paulo	San Salvador
	Goal		Goal	Stadium: Estadio Nacional Flor Blanca

=== Coppa Città di Firenze ===
June 18 International	Fiorentina (Italy)	1–2	(Brazil) São Paulo	Florence
	Goal	Report	Goal	Stadium: Stadio Comunale

June 20 International	Zenit Leningrad (Soviet Union)	0–1	(Brazil) São Paulo	Florence
		Report	Goal	Stadium: Stadio Comunale

== Official competitions ==
=== Torneio Rio-São Paulo ===
March 14 Round 1	Portuguesa	3–1	São Paulo	São Paulo
	Goal		Goal	Stadium: Estádio Municipal Paulo Machado de Carvalho (Pacaembu)

March 22 Round 2	São Paulo	0–2	Botafogo	São Paulo
			Goal	Stadium: Estádio Municipal Paulo Machado de Carvalho (Pacaembu)

March 28 Round 3	Bangu	2–0	São Paulo	Rio de Janeiro
	Goal			Stadium: Estádio Jornalista Mário Filho (Maracanã)

April 9 Round 4	Corinthians	3–0	São Paulo	São Paulo
	Goal			Stadium: Estádio Municipal Paulo Machado de Carvalho (Pacaembu)

April 12 Round 5	Vasco da Gama	1–1	São Paulo	Rio de Janeiro
	Goal		Goal	Stadium: Estádio Jornalista Mário Filho (Maracanã)

April 19 Round 6	Santos	4–1	São Paulo	São Paulo
	Goal		Goal	Stadium: Estádio Municipal Paulo Machado de Carvalho (Pacaembu)

April 23 Round 7	Palmeiras	3–0	São Paulo	São Paulo
	Goal			Stadium: Estádio Municipal Paulo Machado de Carvalho (Pacaembu)

April 26 Round 8	São Paulo	2–0	Flamengo	São Paulo
	Goal			Stadium: Estádio Municipal Paulo Machado de Carvalho (Pacaembu)

May 10 Round 9	Fluminense	3–3	São Paulo	Rio de Janeiro
	Goal		Goal	Stadium: Estádio Manoel Schwartz (das Laranjeiras)

==== Record ====
Final Position	Points	Matches	Wins	Draws	Losses	Goals For	Goals Away	Win%
10th	4	9	1	2	6	8	21	22%

=== Campeonato Paulista ===
July 5 Round 1	Juventus	2–1	São Paulo	São Paulo
	Goal		Goal	Stadium: Estádio Cícero Pompeu de Toledo (Morumbi)

July 12 Round 2	São Paulo	3–0	Ferroviária	São Paulo
	Goal			Stadium: Estádio Cícero Pompeu de Toledo (Morumbi)

July 19 Round 3	Santos	5–1	São Paulo	Santos
	Goal		Goal	Stadium: Estádio Urbano Caldeira (Vila Belmiro)

July 26 Round 4	XV de Piracicaba	1–3	São Paulo	Piracicaba
	Goal		Goal	Stadium: Estádio Roberto Gomes Pedrosa

July 29 Round 5	São Bento	0–0	São Paulo	Sorocaba
				Stadium: Estádio Humberto Reale

August 2 Round 6	Guarani	0–0	São Paulo	Campinas
				Stadium: Estádio Brinco de Ouro da Princesa

August 9 Round 7	São Paulo	2–1	Botafogo	São Paulo
	Goal		Goal	Stadium: Estádio Cícero Pompeu de Toledo (Morumbi)

August 15 Round 8	São Paulo	0–0	Corinthians	São Paulo
				Stadium: Estádio Cícero Pompeu de Toledo (Morumbi)

August 23 Round 9	Comercial	3–2	São Paulo	Ribeirão Preto
	Goal		Goal	Stadium: Estádio Costa Coelho

August 30 Round 10	Palmeiras	0–0	São Paulo	São Paulo
				Stadium: Estádio Cícero Pompeu de Toledo (Morumbi)

September 6 Round 11	São Paulo	0–0	América	São Paulo
				Stadium: Estádio Cícero Pompeu de Toledo (Morumbi)

September 12 Round 12	São Paulo	2–1	Portuguesa	São Paulo
	Goal		Goal	Stadium: Estádio Municipal Paulo Machado de Carvalho (Pacaembu)

September 20 Round 13	Prudentina	4–2	São Paulo	Presidente Prudente
	Goal		Goal	Stadium: Estádio Félix Ribeiro Marcondes

September 23 Round 14	São Paulo	4–1	Esportiva	São Paulo
	Goal		Goal	Stadium: Estádio Municipal Paulo Machado de Carvalho (Pacaembu)

September 27 Round 15	Noroeste	1–1	São Paulo	Bauru
	Goal		Goal	Stadium: Estádio Ubaldo Medeiros

October 3 Round 16	São Paulo	3–2	Juventus	São Paulo
	Goal		Goal	Stadium: Estádio Municipal Paulo Machado de Carvalho (Pacaembu)

October 11 Round 17	São Paulo	2–3	Santos	São Paulo
	Goal		Goal	Stadium: Estádio Cícero Pompeu de Toledo (Morumbi)

October 18 Round 18	Ferroviária	1–1	São Paulo	Araraquara
	Goal		Goal	Stadium: Estádio Doutor Adhemar de Barros (Fonte Luminosa)

October 25 Round 19	São Paulo	0–2	Guarani	São Paulo
			Goal	Stadium: Estádio Cícero Pompeu de Toledo (Morumbi)

October 28 Round 20	São Paulo	1–0	São Bento	São Paulo
	Goal			Stadium: Estádio Municipal Paulo Machado de Carvalho (Pacaembu)

November 1 Round 21	Corinthians	2–0	São Paulo	São Paulo
	Goal			Stadium: Estádio Municipal Paulo Machado de Carvalho (Pacaembu)

November 4 Round 22	Botafogo	1–5	São Paulo	Ribeirão Preto
	Goal		Goal	Stadium: Estádio Luís Pereira

November 8 Round 23	São Paulo	3–2	Comercial	São Paulo
	Goal		Goal	Stadium: Estádio Cícero Pompeu de Toledo (Morumbi)

November 15 Round 24	São Paulo	5–2	Palmeiras	São Paulo
	Goal		Goal	Stadium: Estádio Municipal Paulo Machado de Carvalho (Pacaembu)

November 22 Round 25	América	1–0	São Paulo	São José do Rio Preto
	Goal			Stadium: Estádio Mário Alves Mendonça

November 28 Round 26	Portuguesa	2–0	São Paulo	São Paulo
	Goal			Stadium: Estádio Municipal Paulo Machado de Carvalho (Pacaembu)

December 2 Round 27	São Paulo	6–0	XV de Piracicaba	São Paulo
	Goal			Stadium: Estádio Municipal Paulo Machado de Carvalho (Pacaembu)

December 5 Round 28	São Paulo	1–1	Prudentina	São Paulo
	Goal		Goal	Stadium: Estádio Cícero Pompeu de Toledo (Morumbi)

December 9 Round 29	Esportiva	2–3	São Paulo	Guaratinguetá
	Goal		Goal	Stadium: Estádio Benedito Meirelles

December 13 Round 30	São Paulo	0–0	Noroeste	São Paulo
				Stadium: Estádio Cícero Pompeu de Toledo (Morumbi)

==== Record ====
Final Position	Points	Matches	Wins	Draws	Losses	Goals For	Goals Away	Win%
5th	33	30	12	9	9	51	40	55%
