= 1963 Campeonato Paulista =

Campeonato Paulista – Série A1
- Season: 1963
- Champions: Palmeiras
- Relegated: Jabaquara
- Taça Brasil: Santos; Palmeiras
- Matches played: 240
- Goals scored: 765 (3.19 per match)
- Best Player: Pelé (Santos)
- Top goalscorer: Pelé (Santos) – 22 goals
- Biggest home win: XV de Piracicaba 6-0 Jabaquara (June 23, 1963)
- Biggest away win: Prudentina 0-4 Santos (October 5, 1963)
- Highest scoring: Santos 5-3 Jabaquara (December 11, 1963)

The 1963 Campeonato Paulista de Futebol da Divisão Especial de Profissionais, organized by the Federação Paulista de Futebol, was the 62nd season of São Paulo's top professional football league. Palmeiras won the title for the 14th time. Jabaquara was relegated. This year again, the top scorer was Santos's Pelé, with 22 goals. He had been the top scorer in the league championship every year since 1957.

== Championship ==
The championship was disputed in a double-round robin system, with the team with the most points winning the title and the team with the fewest points being relegated.

Pos	Team	Pld	W	D	L	GF	GA	GD	Pts	Qualification or relegation
1	Palmeiras	30	22	6	2	67	28	+39	50	Champions
2	São Paulo	30	18	8	4	56	26	+30	44	
3	Santos	30	14	8	8	69	52	+17	36	
4	São Bento	30	13	6	11	49	48	+1	32	
5	Juventus	30	11	9	10	45	36	+9	31	
6	Ferroviária	30	12	6	12	55	47	+8	30	
7	Guarani	30	13	4	13	48	48	0	30	
8	Comercial	30	12	6	12	45	50	−5	30	
9	Corinthians	30	10	9	11	50	47	+3	29	
10	Botafogo	30	12	5	13	51	54	−3	29	
11	XV de Piracicaba	30	12	5	13	43	47	−4	29	
12	Portuguesa	30	8	11	11	36	43	−7	27	
13	Noroeste	30	10	6	14	39	53	−14	26	
14	Esportiva de Guaratinguetá	30	7	9	14	36	56	−20	23	
15	Prudentina	30	6	7	17	35	52	−17	19	
16	Jabaquara	30	6	3	21	41	78	−37	15	Relegated

Updated to match(es) played on December 17, 1963. Source: RSSSF.com
Rules for classification: 1) points; 2) goal difference; 3) wins; 4) number of goals scored.

== Top Scores ==
Rank	Player	Club	Goals
1	Pelé	Santos	22
2	Servílio	Palmeiras	21
3	Silva Batuta	Corinthians	17
4	Coutinho	Santos	13
5	Marco Antônio	Comercial	11
5	Toninho Guerreiro	Santos	11
7	Felício	Guaraní	10
7	Prado	São Paulo	10
