= 1961 São Paulo FC season =

São Paulo
1961 season
- Chairman: Laudo Natel
- Manager: Flávio Costa; Manuel Raymundo; Cláudio Cardoso; Caxambu
- Torneio Rio-São Paulo: Group stage
- Campeonato Paulista: 3rd

The 1961 football season was São Paulo's 32nd season since club's existence.

== Overall ==
Games played	73 (9 Torneio Rio-São Paulo, 30 Campeonato Paulista, 34 Friendly match)
Games won	32 (2 Torneio Rio-São Paulo, 18 Campeonato Paulista, 12 Friendly match)
Games drawn	17 (3 Torneio Rio-São Paulo, 5 Campeonato Paulista, 9 Friendly match)
Games lost	24 (4 Torneio Rio-São Paulo, 7 Campeonato Paulista, 13 Friendly match)
Goals scored	169
Goals conceded	117
Goal difference	+52
Best result	6–0 (H) v Portuguesa – Campeonato Paulista – 1961.12.10
Worst result	1–5 (A) v Colo-Colo – Friendly match – 1961.01.28
Most appearances	
Top scorer	

Source: São Paulo FC

== Friendlies ==
January 4 Torneio de Verão	Vasco da Gama (Brazil)	2–2	(Brazil) São Paulo	Rio de Janeiro
	Goal		Goal	Stadium: Estádio Municipal do Rio de Janeiro (Maracanã)

January 7 Torneio de Verão	Flamengo (Brazil)	3–2	(Brazil) São Paulo	Rio de Janeiro
	Goal		Goal	Stadium: Estádio Municipal do Rio de Janeiro (Maracanã)

January 10 Torneio de Verão	São Paulo (Brazil)	1–2	(Brazil) Corinthians	São Paulo
	Goal		Goal	Stadium: Estádio Municipal Paulo Machado de Carvalho (Pacaembu)

January 15 Torneio de Verão	Nacional (Uruguay)	0–2	(Brazil) São Paulo	Montevideo
			Goal	Stadium: Estadio Centenario

January 18 Torneio de Verão	Cerro (Uruguay)	1–0	(Brazil) São Paulo	Montevideo
	Goal			Stadium: Estadio Centenario

January 22 Torneio de Verão	River Plate (Argentina)	3–2	(Brazil) São Paulo	Buenos Aires
	Goal		Goal

January 25 Torneio de Verão	Boca Juniors (Argentina)	1–5	(Brazil) São Paulo	Buenos Aires
	Goal		Goal	Stadium: Estadio Camilo Cichero (La Bombonera)

January 28 International	Colo-Colo (Chile)	5–1	(Brazil) São Paulo	Santiago
	Goal		Goal	Stadium: Estadio Municipal

February 1 International	Universidad Católica (Chile)	2–2	(Brazil) São Paulo	Santiago
	Goal		Goal	Stadium: Estadio Municipal

February 4 International	Colo-Colo (Chile)	1–1	(Brazil) São Paulo	Santiago
	Goal		Goal	Stadium: Estadio Municipal

February 5 National	Elvira	2–4	São Paulo	Jacareí
	Goal		Goal

March 25 National	São Paulo	2–3	Corinthians	São Paulo
	Goal		Goal	Stadium: Estádio Municipal Paulo Machado de Carvalho (Pacaembu)

April 9 National	Guarani	3–2	São Paulo	Campinas
	Goal		Goal	Stadium: Estádio Brinco de Ouro da Princesa

April 21 National	Ferroviária	3–1	São Paulo	Araraquara
	Goal		Goal	Stadium: Estádio Doutor Adhemar de Barros (Fonte Luminosa)

April 23 National	Francana	3–3	São Paulo	Franca
	Goal		Goal

April 30 National	Jaboticabal	2–1	São Paulo	Jaboticabal
	Goal		Goal

May 7 National	Esportiva	1–0	São Paulo	Guaratinguetá
	Goal			Stadium: Estádio Benedito Meirelles

May 11 International	Boca Juniors (Argentina)	1–1	(Brazil) São Paulo	Buenos Aires
	Goal		Goal	Stadium: Estadio Camilo Cichero (La Bombonera)

May 24 National	Corinthians	3–2	São Paulo	São Paulo
	Goal		Goal	Stadium: Estádio Municipal Paulo Machado de Carvalho (Pacaembu)

May 27 National	Portuguesa	1–2	São Paulo	São Paulo
	Goal		Goal	Stadium: Estádio Independência (Canindé)

June 1 National	São Paulo	1–2	Portuguesa	São Paulo
	Goal		Goal	Stadium: Estádio Cícero Pompeu de Toledo (Morumbi)

June 4 International	São Paulo (Brazil)	3–4	(Argentina) Racing	São Paulo
	Goal		Goal	Stadium: Estádio Cícero Pompeu de Toledo (Morumbi)

June 7 National	Londrina	3–5	São Paulo	Londrina
	Goal		Goal	Stadium: Estádio Vitorino Gonçalves Dias

June 11 National	Uberlândia	1–1	São Paulo	Uberlândia
	Goal		Goal	Stadium: Estádio Juca Ribeiro

June 18 National	Sãomanoelense	0–4	São Paulo	São Manuel
			Goal

June 25 International	Racing (Argentina)	2–2	(Brazil) São Paulo	Avellaneda
	Goal		Goal

June 29 International	São Paulo (Brazil)	1–1	(Argentina) Boca Juniors	São Paulo
	Goal		Goal	Stadium: Estádio Cícero Pompeu de Toledo (Morumbi)

August 2 National	Cruzeiro	0–1	São Paulo	Belo Horizonte
			Goal	Stadium: Estádio Raimundo Sampaio (Independência)

September 7 National	CA Ituano	1–3	São Paulo	Itu
	Goal		Goal	Stadium: Estádio Municipal Doutor Novelli Júnior

September 26 National	Inter de Bebedouro	3–5	São Paulo	Bebedouro
	Goal		Goal	Stadium: Estádio Arnaldo Bulle

October 22 Taça Casa André Luiz	AD Mercedes-Benz	2–6	São Paulo	Diadema
	Goal		Goal	Stadium: Campo da Mercedes-Benz

October 24 National	Itapirense	1–1	São Paulo	Itapira
	Goal		Goal

November 12 Troféu Honra ao Mérito	Inter de Limeira	0–2	São Paulo	Limeira
			Goal	Stadium: Estádio Comendador Agostinho Prado

November 26 Taça da Madeira	DERAC	2–3	São Paulo	Itapetininga
	Goal		Goal

== Official competitions ==
=== Torneio Rio-São Paulo ===
March 1 Group A – match 1	São Paulo	2–3	Fluminense	São Paulo
	Goal		Goal	Stadium: Estádio Municipal Paulo Machado de Carvalho (Pacaembu)

March 4 Group A – match 2	São Paulo	1–2	Flamengo	São Paulo
	Goal		Goal	Stadium: Estádio Municipal Paulo Machado de Carvalho (Pacaembu)

March 9 Group A – match 3	Portuguesa	2–2	São Paulo	São Paulo
	Goal		Goal	Stadium: Estádio Municipal Paulo Machado de Carvalho (Pacaembu)

March 15 Group A – match 4	Santos	1–0	São Paulo	São Paulo
	Goal			Stadium: Estádio Municipal Paulo Machado de Carvalho (Pacaembu)

March 18 Group A – match 5	Palmeiras	1–1	São Paulo	São Paulo
	Goal		Goal	Stadium: Estádio Municipal Paulo Machado de Carvalho (Pacaembu)

March 22 Group A – match 6	São Paulo	3–2	Corinthians	São Paulo
	Goal		Goal	Stadium: Estádio Municipal Paulo Machado de Carvalho (Pacaembu)

March 27 Group A – match 7	Vasco da Gama	2–0	São Paulo	Rio de Janeiro
	Goal			Stadium: Estádio Municipal do Rio de Janeiro (Maracanã)

April 1 Group A – match 8	America-RJ	1–2	São Paulo	Rio de Janeiro
	Goal		Goal	Stadium: Estádio Municipal do Rio de Janeiro (Maracanã)

April 5 Group A – match 9	São Paulo	1–1	Botafogo	São Paulo
	Goal		Goal	Stadium: Estádio Municipal Paulo Machado de Carvalho (Pacaembu)

==== Record ====
Final Position	Points	Matches	Wins	Draws	Losses	Goals For	Goals Away	Win%
4th	7	9	2	3	4	12	15	38%

=== Campeonato Paulista ===
July 5 1	São Paulo	3–1	Comercial	São Paulo
	Goal		Goal	Stadium: Estádio Municipal Paulo Machado de Carvalho (Pacaembu)

July 9 2	São Paulo	3–1	Ferroviária	São Paulo
	Goal		Goal	Stadium: Estádio Cícero Pompeu de Toledo (Morumbi)

July 16 3	Noroeste	3–0	São Paulo	Bauru
	Goal			Stadium: Estádio Ubaldo Medeiros

July 19 4	Corinthians	0–1	São Paulo	São Paulo
			Goal	Stadium: Estádio Municipal Paulo Machado de Carvalho (Pacaembu)

July 29 5	São Paulo	3–1	Jabaquara	São Paulo
	Goal		Goal	Stadium: Estádio Cícero Pompeu de Toledo (Morumbi)

August 6 6	Esportiva	1–3	São Paulo	Guaratinguetá
	Goal		Goal	Stadium: Estádio Benedito Meirelles

August 13 7	São Paulo	6–1	Portuguesa	São Paulo
	Goal		Goal	Stadium: Estádio Cícero Pompeu de Toledo (Morumbi)

August 20 8	Palmeiras	0–0	São Paulo	São Paulo
				Stadium: Estádio Cícero Pompeu de Toledo (Morumbi)

August 23 9	São Paulo	3–1	XV de Piracicaba	São Paulo
	Goal		Goal	Stadium: Estádio Municipal Paulo Machado de Carvalho (Pacaembu)

August 27 10	São Paulo	3–0	Taubaté	São Paulo
	Goal			Stadium: Estádio Cícero Pompeu de Toledo (Morumbi)

September 3 11	Santos	6–3	São Paulo	São Paulo
	Goal		Goal	Stadium: Estádio Cícero Pompeu de Toledo (Morumbi)

September 10 12	Guarani	3–0	São Paulo	Campinas
	Goal			Stadium: Estádio Brinco de Ouro da Princesa

September 17 13	São Paulo	5–3	Portuguesa Santista	São Paulo
	Goal		Goal	Stadium: Estádio Cícero Pompeu de Toledo (Morumbi)

September 20 14	São Paulo	5–0	Juventus	São Paulo
	Goal			Stadium: Estádio Municipal Paulo Machado de Carvalho (Pacaembu)

September 23 15	Botafogo-SP	2–2	São Paulo	Ribeirão Preto
	Goal		Goal	Stadium: Estádio Luís Pereira (Vila Tibério)

October 8 16	Comercial	2–1	São Paulo	Ribeirão Preto
	Goal		Goal	Stadium: Costa Coelho

October 11 17	São Paulo	5–2	Guarani	São Paulo
	Goal		Goal	Stadium: Estádio Municipal Paulo Machado de Carvalho (Pacaembu)

October 15 18	Ferroviária	2–2	São Paulo	Araraquara
	Goal		Goal	Stadium: Estádio Doutor Adhemar de Barros (Fonte Luminosa)

October 21 19	São Paulo	2–0	Botafogo-SP	São Paulo
	Goal			Stadium: Estádio Municipal Paulo Machado de Carvalho (Pacaembu)

October 28 20	Portuguesa Santista	1–2	São Paulo	Santos
	Goal		Goal	Stadium: Estádio Ulrico Mursa

October 31 21	São Paulo	4–1	Esportiva	São Paulo
	Goal		Goal	Stadium: Estádio Municipal Paulo Machado de Carvalho (Pacaembu)

November 5 22	Jabaquara	0–1	São Paulo	Santos
			Goal	Stadium: Estádio Urbano Caldeira (Vila Belmiro)

November 8 23	Corinthians	0–0	São Paulo	São Paulo
				Stadium: Estádio Municipal Paulo Machado de Carvalho (Pacaembu)

November 15 24	XV de Piracicaba	2–1	São Paulo	Piracicaba
	Goal		Goal	Stadium: Estádio Roberto Gomes Pedroza

November 19 25	Taubaté	2–0	São Paulo	Taubaté
	Goal			Stadium: Campo do Bosque

November 22 26	Palmeiras	0–0	São Paulo	São Paulo
				Stadium: Estádio Palestra Itália (Parque Antártica)

December 2 27	São Paulo	3–1	Juventus	São Paulo
	Goal		Goal	Stadium: Estádio Municipal Paulo Machado de Carvalho (Pacaembu)

December 10 28	São Paulo	6–0	Portuguesa	São Paulo
	Goal			Stadium: Estádio Independência (Canindé)

December 13 29	São Paulo	5–0	Noroeste	São Paulo
	Goal			Stadium: Estádio Municipal Paulo Machado de Carvalho (Pacaembu)

December 16 30	Santos	4–1	São Paulo	Santos
	Goal		Goal	Stadium: Estádio Urbano Caldeira (Vila Belmiro)

==== Record ====
Final Position	Points	Matches	Wins	Draws	Losses	Goals For	Goals Away	Win%
3rd	41	30	18	5	7	73	40	68%
