= Carlos César (disambiguation) =

Carlos César (born 1956) is a Portuguese politician.

Carlos César may also refer to:

- Carlos César (football manager) (born 1943), Brazilian football manager
- Carlos César (footballer, born 1938), Carlos César de Souza, Brazilian footballer
- Carlos César (footballer, born 1987), Carlos César Neves, Brazilian footballer
