= Van Sam =

Van Sam is a surname. Notable people with the surname include:

- Guy Van Sam (1935–2024), French footballer
- Lai Van Sam (born 1957), Vietnamese journalist
