= Silas Pereira =

Silas Pereira may refer to:

- Paulo Silas (born 1965), full name Paulo Silas do Prado Pereira, Brazilian football midfielder
- Silas (footballer, born 1934) (1934–2014), full name Silas Ferreira de Souza, Brazilian football goalkeeper
