= Paulo Lumumba =

Brazilian footballer (1936–2010)

Personal information
- Full name: Paulo Otacílio de Souza
- Date of birth: June 22, 1936
- Place of birth: Aracaju, Brazil
- Date of death: 21 August 2010 (aged 74)
- Place of death: Porto Alegre, Brazil
- Position: Striker

Senior career*
Years	Team	Apps	(Gls)
1955–1958	Confiança		
1959–1961	São Paulo	66	(30)
1961–1968	Grêmio	146	(55)
1968–1970	Aimoré		
- * Club domestic league appearances and goals as of 23 September 2023

Paulo Otacílio de Souza (22 June 1936 – 21 August 2010), better known as Paulo Lumumba, was a Brazilian professional footballer who played as a striker.

== Career ==
A center forward with great defining quality, he made history at Grêmio FBPA, participating in most of the club's achievements in the 1960s. After retiring, he became an employee of the club.

== Nickname ==
The origin of the nickname is due to the similarity between the player and Patrice Lumumba.

== Honours ==
Grêmio

- Campeonato Sul-Brasileiro: 1962
- Campeonato Gaúcho: 1963, 1964, 1965, 1966, 1967
- Campeonato Citadino de Porto Alegre: 1964, 1965

Individual

- 1962 Campeonato Gaúcho top scorer: 13 goals

== Death ==
Passed away in the city of Porto Alegre at the age of 74.
