= Wilson Buzzone =

Brazilian footballer

Personal information
- Full name: Wilson Buzzone
- Date of birth: 19 November 1938
- Place of birth: São Paulo, Brazil
- Date of death: 2 November 2023 (aged 84)
- Place of death: São Paulo, Brazil
- Position: Forward

Youth career
- Ginásio Paulista (Pari)

Senior career*
Years	Team	Apps	(Gls)
1956–1957	São Paulo		
1957–1958	Nacional-SP		
1958–1962	Juventus-SP		
1963	Jabaquara		
1964	Sport Boys		
1965	Palmeiras		
1965	Bragantino		
1966	Juventus-SP		
1967	Saad		
1967–1968	Jabaquara		
- * Club domestic league appearances and goals as of 16 January 2024

Wilson Buzzone (19 November 1938 – 2 November 2023), was a Brazilian professional footballer who played as a forward.

== Career ==
Having started his career as a goalkeeper at the amateur team Ginásio Paulista, he was switched to center forward when he arrived at São Paulo FC, but did not adapt. He played for Nacional and later for Juventus, the team where he spent most of his career, with 72 appearances and 48 goals. He also played for Jabaquara, Palmeiras and had a spell in Peruvian football with Sport Boys. He was also part of the champion squad of the second division of São Paulo with Bragantino.

== Honours ==
Bragantino

- Campeonato Paulista Série A2: 1965

== Death ==
Buzzone died in São Paulo, 2 November 2023, aged 84.
