= Joel Camargo =

Brazilian footballer

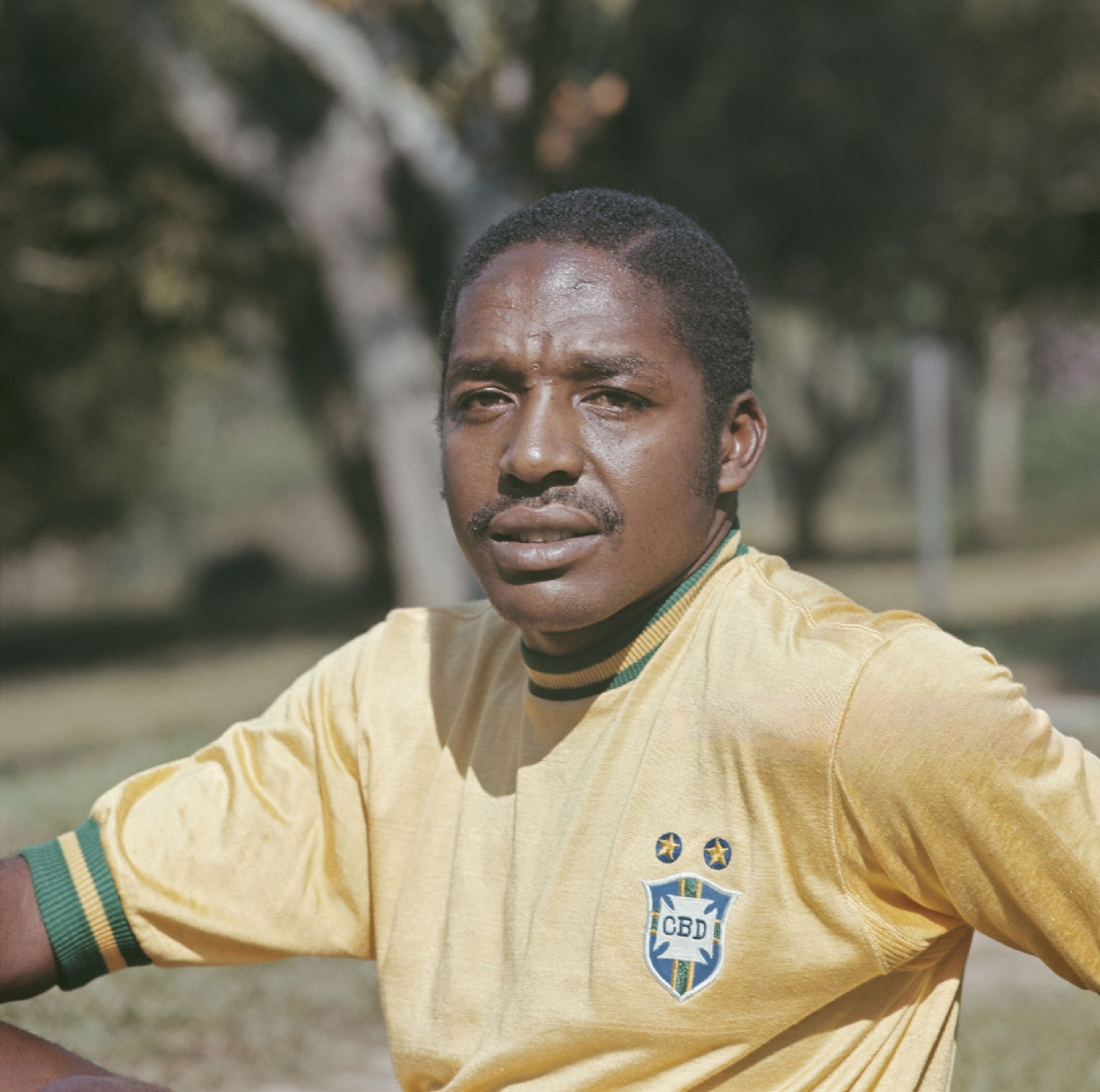
- Joel Camargo in 1970

Personal information
- Date of birth: 18 September 1946
- Place of birth: Santos, São Paulo, Brazil
- Date of death: 23 May 2014 (aged 67)
- Place of death: Santos, São Paulo, Brazil
- Height: 1.83 m (6 ft 0 in)
- Position: Defender

Senior career*
Years	Team	Apps	(Gls)
1963	Portuguesa Santista		
1963–1971	Santos		
1971–1972	Paris Saint-Germain	2	(0)
1973	Saad		

International career
1964–1970	Brazil	28	(0)
Medal record
Men's Football
Representing Brazil
FIFA World Cup
Winner	1970 Mexico
- * Club domestic league appearances and goals

Joel Camargo (18 September 1946 – 23 May 2014) was a Brazilian professional footballer who played as a defender.

== Club career ==
Joel played for Portuguese Santista, Santos, Paris Saint-Germain, and Saad during his 10-year career. He played a total of two matches for PSG during the 1971–72 season.

== International career ==
Joel was a defender of the Brazil national football team when they won the 1970 FIFA World Cup. He earned 28 caps for Brazil between 1964 and 1970 (plus 10 unofficial matches).

== Death ==
Camargo died of kidney failure at age 67 on 23 May 2014.

== Honours ==
Santos

- Campeonato Paulista: 1964, 1965, 1967, 1968, 1969
- Torneio Rio–São Paulo: 1963, 1964, 1966
- Campeonato Brasileiro: 1964, 1965, 1968
- Intercontinental Champions' Supercup: 1968

Brazil

- FIFA World Cup: 1970
