= Lima (footballer, born 1944) =

Brazilian footballer

Personal information
- Full name: Eduardo Teixeira Lima
- Date of birth: 31 October 1944
- Place of birth: Serra Dourada, Brazil
- Date of death: 24 August 2020 (aged 75)
- Place of death: São Paulo, Brazil
- Position: Left winger

Senior career*
Years	Team	Apps	(Gls)
1962–1970	Corinthians	112	(19)
1965–1967	→ Millonarios (loan)	112	(45)
1968	→ Boca Juniors (loan)	6	(0)
1968	→ Atlético Junior (loan)		
1971–1974	Cruzeiro	209	(43)
1974–1975	Náutico		
1976	Sport Recife		
1977–1979	Santiago Morning		
1979–1982	O'Higgins		
- * Club domestic league appearances and goals as of 13 December 2025

Eduardo Teixeira Lima (31 October 1944 – 24 October 2020), simply known as Lima, was a Brazilian professional footballer who played as a left winger.

== Career ==
Left winger, Lima had spells for major Brazilian football teams, most notably for Corinthians, where he made 171 appearances and for Cruzeiro, where he won the state championships in 1972 and 1973. His passage for Corinthians was broken up by loans to Millonarios, Atlético Junior and Boca Juniors, and after leaving Cruzeiro, he played for Sport Recife and Náutico, before moving to Chile, where he played for Santiago Morning before ending his career at O'Higgins. After retiring, he opened a pizza shop in São Paulo, and died in that city in 2020, aged 75.

== Honours ==
Cruzeiro

- Campeonato Mineiro: 1972, 1973

Náutico

- Campeonato Pernambucano: 1974
