= Nair (footballer) =

Brazilian footballer (1937–2018)

Personal information
- Full name: Nair José da Silva
- Date of birth: 20 May 1937
- Place of birth: Itaperuna, Brazil
- Date of death: 22 August 2018 (aged 81)
- Place of death: São Paulo, Brazil
- Position: Attacking midfielder

Youth career
- Madureira

Senior career*
Years	Team	Apps	(Gls)
1957–1962	Madureira		
1963	Botafogo-SP		
1963–1965	Portuguesa	162	(42)
1966–1968	Corinthians	90	(13)
1968–1971	Atlético Paranaense		
1969	→ Coritiba (loan)		

International career
1965	Brazil	1	(1)
- * Club domestic league appearances and goals as of 10 February 2024

Nair José da Silva (20 May 1937 – 22 August 2018), simply known as Nair, was a Brazilian professional footballer who played as an attacking midfielder.

== Career ==
Born in Itaperuna, Nair began his career at Madureira EC, where he played in the late 1950s. He transferred to Portuguesa, where he made 162 appearances and scored 42 goals between 1963 and 1965, which aroused the interest of Corinthians, where he was champion of the Rio-São Paulo Tournament in 1966 and made 90 appearances. He also played for the Atletiba duo, being state champion in 1970 with Athletico.

Nair also participated in the São Paulo state football team, and in 1965 he played for the Brazil, against Hungary, scoring a goal.

== Death ==
Nair died in São Paulo on 22 August 2018, at the age of 81.

== Honours ==
Corinthians

- Torneio Rio-São Paulo: 1966 (shared)

Athletico Paranaense

- Campeonato Paranaense: 1970
