= Guy Van Sam =

French footballer (1935–2024)

Personal information
- Date of birth: 20 December 1935
- Place of birth: Beirut, Lebanese Republic
- Date of death: 8 February 2024 (aged 88)
- Place of death: Toulon, France
- Height: 1.72 m (5 ft 8 in)
- Position: Striker

Youth career
- 1955–1958: Enclos Saint-François

Senior career*
Years	Team	Apps	(Gls)
1958–1960	Montpellier	73	(47)
1960–1965	Racing Paris	122	(61)
1965–1968	Toulon	85	(30)
1968–1972	La Valette		
Total		280	(138)

International career
1961	France	3	(0)
- * Club domestic league appearances and goals

Guy Van Sam (20 December 1935 – 8 February 2024) was a footballer who played as a striker for Montpellier, RC Paris, and Toulon. Born in Lebanon, he made three appearances for the France national team.

== Early life ==
Van Sam was born in Beirut, Lebanon on 20 December 1935 to Tran Van Sam, born in Kampong Chhnang, Cambodia, an ethnic Vietnamese French consul in Beirut, and a Lebanese mother from the Mouawad family. His father joined the Free French Forces, becoming Secretary General of their General Staff, and was the first person of Asian descent to be naturalized French. Following Lebanon's independence in 1946, the family settled in France.

Van Sam attended the Enclos Saint-François private school in Montpellier. He has two brothers who also played football: his brother, Richard, later became the head coach of the Tahiti national football team in 1980, and then in 1997.

== Career ==
Vam Sam scored 50 goals in 96 Division 1 matches with RC Paris (1960–1965), and 86 goals in 185 Division 2 matches with SO Montpellier (1958–1960) and SC Toulon (1965–1968).

He played three games for the France national team in 1961, against Belgium (friendly), Spain (friendly), and Bulgaria (1962 FIFA World Cup qualification). Van Sam was the first player of Vietnamese descent to play for the France national team.

== Death ==
Van Sam died in Toulon on 8 February 2024, at the age of 88.

== Bibliography ==
- Barreaud, Marc (1998). Dictionnaire des footballeurs étrangers du championnat professionnel français (1932-1997). L'Harmattan, Paris. ISBN 2-7384-6608-7.
