= Pagão (footballer) =

Brazilian footballer

Personal information
- Full name: Paulo César Araújo
- Date of birth: 27 October 1934
- Place of birth: Santos, Brazil
- Date of death: 4 April 1991 (aged 56)
- Place of death: Santos, Brazil
- Position: Forward

Youth career
- Jabaquara
- Portuguesa Santista

Senior career*
Years	Team	Apps	(Gls)
1952–1955	Portuguesa Santista		
1955–1963	Santos	345	(157)
1963–1966	São Paulo	59	(14)
1967	Santos		
1968	Portuguesa Santista		

International career
1957	Brazil	2	(0)
- * Club domestic league appearances and goals

Paulo César Araújo (27 October 1934 – 4 April 1991), commonly known as Pagão, was a Brazilian footballer who played as a forward.

== Honours ==
=== Club ===
Santos

- Intercontinental Cup: 1962
- Copa Libertadores: 1962
- Taça Brasil: 1961, 1962
- Torneio Rio – São Paulo: 1959, 1963
- Campeonato Paulista: 1955, 1956, 1958, 1960, 1961, 1962

São Paulo

- Small Club World Cup: 1963
