= Geraldino (footballer) =

Brazilian footballer (1940–2018)

Personal information
- Full name: Geraldo Antônio Martins
- Date of birth: 11 January 1940
- Place of birth: Raposos, Brazil
- Date of death: 30 March 2018 (aged 78)
- Position: Left back

Senior career*
Years	Team	Apps	(Gls)
1958–1961	Siderúrgica		
1961–1963	Cruzeiro		
1963–1968	Santos	214	(2)
1968–1970	Portuguesa		

International career
1963–1964	Brazil		
- * Club domestic league appearances and goals

Geraldo Antônio Martins (11 January 1940 – 30 March 2018), known as Geraldino or simply Geraldo, was a Brazilian footballer who played as a left back.

== Honours ==
Cruzeiro

- Campeonato Mineiro: 1961

Santos

- Intercontinental Cup: 1963
- Copa Libertadores: 1963
- Taça Brasil: 1963, 1964
- Torneio Rio – São Paulo: 1963
- Campeonato Paulista: 1964, 1965, 1967
