= Carlos César (footballer, born 1938) =

Brazilian footballer (1938–2011)

Personal information
- Full name: Carlos César de Souza
- Date of birth: 6 September 1938
- Place of birth: Ribeirão Preto, Brazil
- Date of death: 1 April 2011 (aged 72)
- Place of death: Uberaba, Brazil
- Height: 1.70 m (5 ft 7 in)
- Position: Left winger

Senior career*
Years	Team	Apps	(Gls)
1956–1957	Comercial-RP		
1958–1960	São Paulo	14	(6)
1959	→ Comercial-RP (loan)	31	(15)
1961–1964	SPAL	26	(6)
1965–1967	Comercial-RP		
1968	Uberaba		
1969–1970	Francana		
1971	Comercial-RP		
- * Club domestic league appearances and goals as of 1 March 2024

Carlos César de Souza (6 September 1938 – 1 April 2011), simply known as Carlos César (sometimes spelled as Carlos Cezar), was a Brazilian professional footballer who played as a left winger.

== Career ==
Left winger who gained notoriety for his goals from free kicks, Carlos César was revealed by Comercial de Ribeirão Preto, and was also notable for his spells at São Paulo, where he made 14 appearances and scored 6 goals, and at SPAL, where he played from 1961 to 1964.

== Death ==
Carlos César died on 1 April 2011 from liver failure.
