= 1963 Torneio Rio-São Paulo =

Torneio Rio-São Paulo
- Season: 1963
- Champions: Santos (2nd title)
- Matches played: 45
- Goals scored: 173 (3.84 per match)
- Top goalscorer: Pelé (Santos) – 14 goals

The 1963 Torneio Rio São Paulo was the 16th edition of the football tournament Torneio Rio-São Paulo. It was disputed between 13 February to 31 March.

== Participants ==
Team	City	Nº participations	Best result
Botafogo	Rio de Janeiro	13	Champions: 1962
Corinthians	(São Paulo (state)) São Paulo	16	Champions: 1950, 1953, 1954
Flamengo	Rio de Janeiro	15	Champions: 1961
Fluminense	Rio de Janeiro	15	Champions: 1957, 1960
Olaria	Rio de Janeiro	1	Debut
Palmeiras	(São Paulo (state)) São Paulo	16	Champions: 1933, 1951
Portuguesa	(São Paulo (state)) São Paulo	16	Champions: 1952, 1955
Santos	(São Paulo (state)) Santos	12	Champions: 1959
São Paulo	(São Paulo (state)) São Paulo	16	Runners-up: 1933, 1962
Vasco da Gama	Rio de Janeiro	16	Champions: 1958

== Format ==
The tournament were disputed in a single round-robin format, with the club with most points conquered being the champions.

== Tournament ==
Following is the summary of the 1963 Torneio Rio-São Paulo tournament:

Pos	Team	Pld	W	D	L	GF	GA	GD	Pts
1	(São Paulo (state)) Santos (C)	9	6	1	2	30	15	+15	13
2	(São Paulo (state)) Corinthians	9	6	0	3	15	9	+6	12
3	Fluminense	9	4	3	2	13	12	+1	11
4	Botafogo	9	3	4	2	16	14	+2	10 (Note: Tied in points)
5	(São Paulo (state)) Palmeiras	9	4	2	3	12	12	0	10
6	(São Paulo (state)) Portuguesa	9	3	3	3	18	21	−3	9
7	Flamengo	9	4	0	5	14	13	+1	8 (Note: Tied in points)
8	(São Paulo (state)) São Paulo	9	3	2	4	11	16	−5	8
9	Vasco da Gama	9	1	5	3	9	12	−3	7
10	Olaria	9	0	2	7	9	23	−14	2

Source: RSSSF
(C) Champions
Notes:

Note: The match Botafogo 3–1 Santos, disputed 31 March 1963, is also valid for the 1962 Taça Brasil finals (second leg).
