= Nené (footballer, born 1942) =

Brazilian footballer and manager

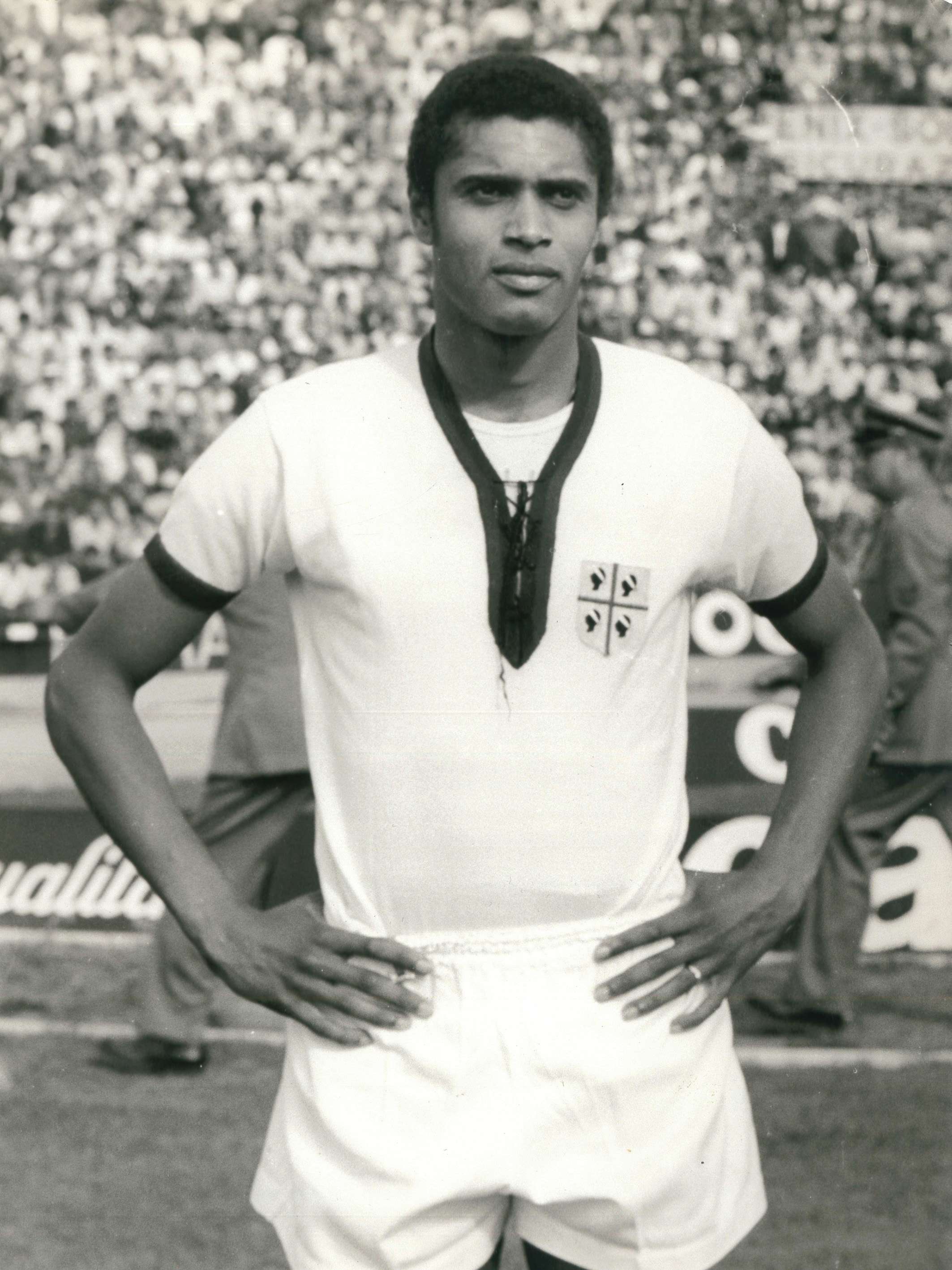
- Nené at Cagliari in 1969–70 season

Personal information
- Full name: Claudio Olinto de Carvalho
- Date of birth: 1 February 1942
- Place of birth: Santos, Brazil
- Date of death: 3 September 2016 (aged 74)
- Place of death: Capoterra, Italy
- Height: 1.82 m (6 ft 0 in)
- Position: Midfielder

Senior career*
| Years | Team | Apps | (Gls) |
| 1960–1963 | Santos | 54 | (24) |
| 1963–1964 | Juventus | 28 | (11) |
| 1964–1976 | Cagliari | 311 | (23) |
| Total | | 393 | (58) |

International career
| 1963 | Brazil Olympic | 4 | (1) |

Managerial career
- 1978–1981: Fiorentina (youth)
- 1981–1982: Paganese
- 1982–1983: Sant'Elena Quartu
- 1983–1988: Cagliari (youth)
- 1988–2000: Juventus (youth)
Medal record
Men's Football
Representing Brazil
Pan American Games
| Gold medal – first place | 1963 São Paulo |
- * Club domestic league appearances and goals

Claudio Olinto de Carvalho (Note: This name uses Portuguese naming customs: the first or maternal family name is Olinto and the second or paternal family name is de Carvalho.) (1 February 1942 – 3 September 2016), also known as Nené or Nenê, was a Brazilian professional football coach and a former player, who played as a midfielder.

== Honours ==
Santos

- Campeonato Paulista: 1962
- Taça Brasil: 1962, 1963
- Torneio Rio-São Paulo: 1963
- Copa Libertadores: 1962, 1963
- Intercontinental Cup: 1962

Cagliari

- Serie A: 1969–70

Brazil

- Pan American Games: 1963
