= Cabrita (footballer) =

Brazilian footballer

Personal information
- Full name: Jorge Soares Marins
- Date of birth: 20 January 1939 (age 87)
- Place of birth: Campos dos Goytacazes, Brazil
- Position: Forward

Senior career*
Years	Team	Apps	(Gls)
1955–1956	Goytacaz		
1957	Americano		
1958	Bonsucesso		
1959–1960	Vasco da Gama		
1960	Atlético Mineiro		
1960–1961	Guarani		
1962	Paulista		
1962–1963	Jabaquara		
1964	XV de Piracicaba		
1965	São Bento		
1966–1967	Goiás		
- * Club domestic league appearances and goals as of 1 March 2024

Jorge Soares Marins (born 20 January 1939), better known as Cabrita, is a Brazilian former professional footballer who played as a forward.

== Career ==
Revealed at Goytacaz, Cabrita was brought to Vasco da Gama to replace Vavá, who was traded to Atlético Madrid in 1959. He made history by scoring the last goal at the Maracanã Stadium with Rio de Janeiro as a federal district, on 19 April 1960.
