= Felício Palermo =

Brazilian footballer

Felício
Personal information
- Full name: Felício Palermo
- Date of birth: 11 May 1940 (age 86)
- Place of birth: São Paulo, Brazil
- Position: Forward

Youth career
- 1958–1959: Corinthians

Senior career*
Years	Team	Apps	(Gls)
1959–1966	Corinthians	46	(19)
1963–1964	→ Guarani (loan)		
1964–1966	→ Juventus-SP (loan)		
1967	Ferroviária		
1968	Bragantino		
1971–1974	Millonarios		
- * Club domestic league appearances and goals as of 22 February 2024

Felício Palermo (born 11 May 1940), is a Brazilian former professional footballer who played as a forward.

== Career ==
Revealed in Corinthians youth sectors, Felício played for the club from 1959 to 1966, making 46 appearances and scoring 19 goals. He suffered a fractured tibia during a match at the end of 1961, hampering his performance, which led to him being loaned to Guarani in 1963, and later to CA Juventus. After ending his contract with Corinthians, played for Ferroviária and Bragantino, until retiring. Returned in 1971 with an invitation to play for Millonarios FC, where he was Colombian champion and acted until 1974. After retiring permanently from football, he worked as a waiter and later a pastry chef.

== Honours ==
Millonarios

- Categoría Primera A: 1972
