= Dalmo (footballer, born 1932) =

Brazilian footballer

Personal information
- Date of birth: 19 October 1932
- Place of birth: Jundiai, Brazil
- Date of death: 2 February 2015 (aged 82)
- Place of death: Jundiai, Brazil
- Position: Left back

Senior career*
Years	Team	Apps	(Gls)
1951–1954	Paulista		
1954–1957	Guarani		
1957–1964	Santos		
1964–1966	Guarani		
1967	Paulista		

Managerial career
- 1980: Catanduvense
- 1981: Santo André
- 1983: Sãocarlense
- 1985: Taubaté
- * Club domestic league appearances and goals

Dalmo Gaspar (19 October 1932 – 2 February 2015), simply known as Dalmo, was a Brazilian footballer who played as a left back.

Dalmo started his career at hometown club Paulista and joined Santos from Guarani in 1957. He was The scorer of the goal who gave Santos the 1963 Intercontinental Cup over Milan.
