= Silas (footballer, born 1934) =

Brazilian footballer (1934–2014)

Personal information
- Full name: Silas Ferreira de Souza
- Date of birth: 12 September 1934
- Place of birth: Ponta Grossa, Brazil
- Date of death: 19 May 2014 (aged 79)

Senior career*
Years	Team	Apps	(Gls)
1955-1960	Atletico Paranaense		
1961-1966	Santos		
1966-1967	Portuguesa		
1968-1970	Atletico Paranaense		

International career
1963	Brazil	2	(0)
- * Club domestic league appearances and goals

Silas Ferreira de Souza (12 September 1934 – 19 May 2014), known as Silas Pereira or just Silas, was a Brazilian footballer. He played in two matches for the Brazil national football team during the 1963 South American Championship. He died on 19 May 2014, at the age of 79.
