= Lima (footballer, born 1942) =

Brazilian footballer (1942–2025)

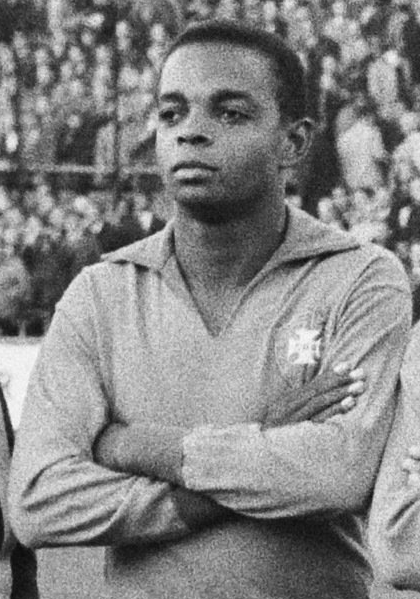
- Lima in 1963

Personal information
- Full name: Antônio Lima dos Santos
- Date of birth: 18 January 1942
- Place of birth: São Sebastião do Paraíso, Brazil
- Date of death: 3 February 2025 (aged 83)
- Place of death: Santos, Brazil
- Height: 1.73 m (5 ft 8 in)
- Positions: Defender; midfielder

Youth career
- 1958–1959: Juventus-SP

Senior career*
Years	Team	Apps	(Gls)
1959–1961	Juventus-SP		
1961–1971	Santos		
1971–1974	Jalisco		
1974	Fluminense		
1975	Tampa Bay Rowdies	2	(0)
1975–1979	Portuguesa Santista		

International career
1963–1966	Brazil	14	(4)
- * Club domestic league appearances and goals

Antônio Lima dos Santos (18 January 1942 – 3 February 2025), known as Lima, was a Brazilian professional footballer. Widely known for his versatility, he played mainly as a defensive midfielder, but also acted as a full-back at either side and as a central defender.

== Club career ==
Born in São Sebastião do Paraíso, Minas Gerais, Lima joined Juventus-SP's youth setup at early age and was promoted to the first team in 1959. In 1961, already a first-choice, he moved to Santos, becoming a starter at the right-back as the club's midfielder was captain Zito.

Lima only moved to his original position in 1965, after the arrival of Carlos Alberto Torres. He left the club in 1971 after accepting an offer from Jalisco, ending his time at Santos by playing nearly 700 matches and winning every title that a Brazilian club team could win at that time, most notably the Intercontinental Cup of 1962 and 1963; at the latter's final, he trademarked his versatility after playing as a striker.

In 1974, Lima returned to Brazil and joined Fluminense. In the following year, he represented Tampa Bay Rowdies for the final two matches of the 1975 NASL Indoor tournament, and ended his career with Portuguesa Santista.

== International career ==
Lima earned 14 caps for the Brazil national team, and was part of the team at the 1966 FIFA World Cup, playing in all three of Brazil's matches.

== Death ==
Lima died from kidney disease on 3 February 2025, at the age of 83.
