= Calvet (footballer) =

Brazilian footballer (1934–2008)

Personal information
- Full name: Raul Donazar Calvet
- Date of birth: 3 November 1934
- Place of birth: Bagé, Brazil
- Date of death: 29 March 2008 (aged 73)
- Place of death: Porto Alegre, Brazil
- Position: Centre back

Senior career*
Years	Team	Apps	(Gls)
1951–1956	Guarany Bagé		
1956–1959	Grêmio		
1960–1964	Santos	217	(1)

International career
1960–1962	Brazil	2	(0)
- * Club domestic league appearances and goals

Raul Donazar Calvet (3 November 1934 – 29 March 2008), simply known as Calvet, was a Brazilian footballer who played as a central defender.

== Honours ==
=== Club ===
Grêmio

- Campeonato Gaúcho: 1956, 1957, 1958, 1959

Santos

- Intercontinental Cup: 1962, 1963
- Copa Libertadores: 1962, 1963
- Taça Brasil: 1961, 1962, 1963, 1964
- Torneio Rio – São Paulo: 1963
- Campeonato Paulista: 1960, 1961, 1962, 1964
