= Associação Prudentina de Esportes Atléticos =

Prudentina
- Full name: Associação Prudentina de Esportes Atléticos
- Founded: 26 October 1936; 89 years ago
- Ground: Estádio Félix Ribeiro Marcondes
- Capacity: 15,600
Home colors	Away colors

Associação Pruedentina de Esportes Atléticos, simply known as Prudentina, is a Brazilian social club and a former professional football and basketball club based in Presidente Prudente, São Paulo.

== History ==
Founded in 1936, Prudentina reached its glory days during the 60s, when it won the third and second divisions of São Paulo, and played in the elite for six seasons (1962 to 1967, its last year as a professional). Played at the Félix Ribeiro Marcondes Stadium, demolished in the 80s. Prudentina also had a women's basketball team in the 80s, twice champion in the category.

== Honours ==
=== State ===
- Campeonato Paulista Série A2
  - Winners (1): 1961
- Campeonato Paulista Série A3
  - Winners (1): 1960

=== Women's basketball ===
- Campeonato Paulista de Basquete Feminino
  - Winners: 1982, 1983
