= Estádio Luís Pereira =

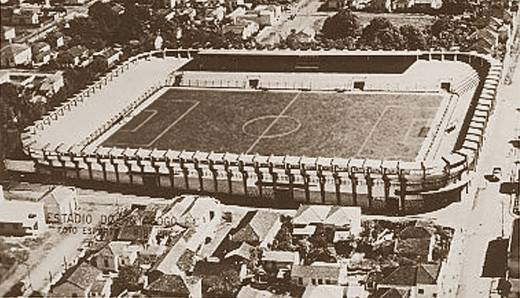
- Full name: Estádio Luís Pereira
- Location: Ribeirão Preto, Brazil
- Owner: Botafogo Futebol Clube
- Operator: Botafogo Futebol Clube
- Capacity: 15,000

Construction
- Opened: February 24, 1924
- Closed: 1967

Tenant
- Botafogo Futebol Clube

Estádio Luís Pereira was a multi-use stadium in Ribeirão Preto, Brazil. It was initially used as the stadium of Botafogo Futebol Clube matches. It was replaced by Estádio Santa Cruz in 1967. The capacity of the stadium was 15,000 spectators.
