= Associação Esportiva Guaratinguetá =

Esportiva
- Full name: Associação Esportiva Guaratinguetá
- Nickname: Loba do Vale
- Founded: 3 November 1915; 110 years ago
- Ground: Ninho da Garça
- Capacity: 15,869
- Website: https://esportivaguaratingueta.com.br/
Home colors	Away colors

Associação Esportiva Guaratinguetá, simply known as Esportiva, is a Brazilian inactive professional football club based in Guaratinguetá, São Paulo.

== History ==
Founded in 1915 as Associação Sportiva Guaratinguetá, it played in competitions in the countryside of APEA until the 1930s. It entered professional football in 1954, being champion of the second division in 1960, and thus competing in the elite of the Campeonato Paulista from 1961 to 1964, including defeated Pelé's Santos FC on two occasions.

The club played in the lower divisions of the state championship until 1998, when, due to accumulated debts, abandoned professional football, opening space for the creation of Guaratinguetá Futebol, which represented the city in the 2000s. Still counting on the affection and enthusiasm of the city's fans, Esportiva's return to professional football was speculated on several occasions. As of 2020, the club returned to competing in youth category competitions.

== Honours ==
- Campeonato Paulista Série A2
  - Winners (1): 1960
