= History of São Paulo FC =

History of Brazilian association football club São Paulo Futebol Clube

The history of São Paulo FC began to take shape in 1900, when the Club Athletico Paulistano was founded. Paulistano quickly stood out, becoming a major powerhouse in Paulista football and Brazilian football at the beginning of the 20th century. Paulistano refused to embrace the emerging professionalism in football, and some dissidents joined the Associação Atlética das Palmeiras, which had the best stadium at the time but was heavily in debt, to found São Paulo.

The club is one of the most successful in Brazilian football, with the highest number of titles in some of the main football tournaments contested by Brazilian clubs, including the Brazilian Championship (six titles), the Copa Libertadores (three titles), and the Club World Championship (three titles).

== The Tricolor Paulista — 1930 to 1934 ==
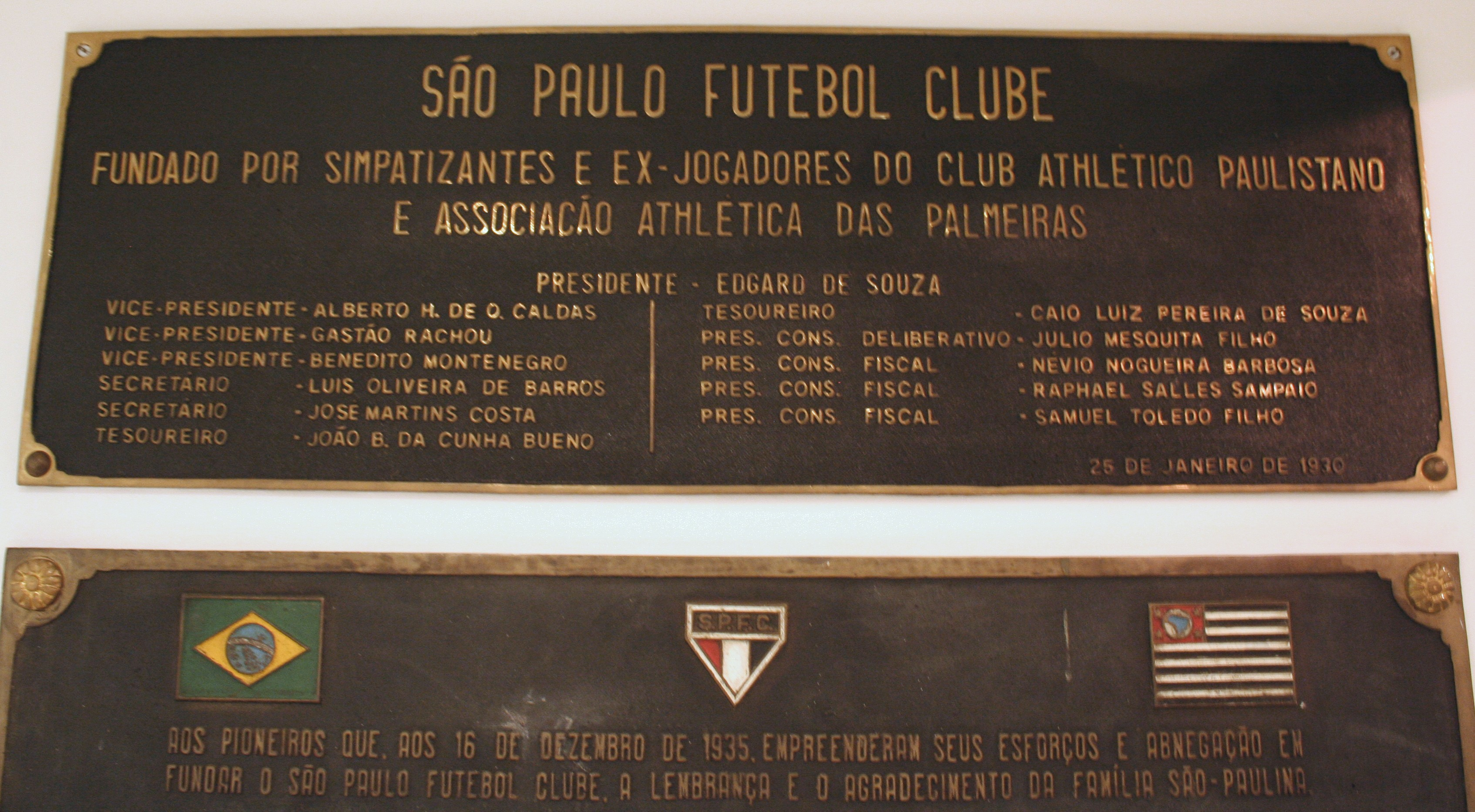
Plaques commemorating the club's foundations in 1930 and 1935, displayed at the Luiz Cássio dos Santos Werneck memorial.

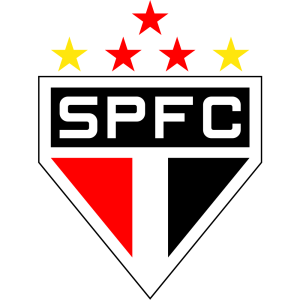
+ =

On January 27, 1930, at 2:00 p.m., the minutes of the foundation of São Paulo FC were signed at Praça da República, born from the merger between Associação Atlética das Palmeiras and Club Athletico Paulistano, with the club's official founding date established as January 25, 1930, a day and month chosen by its founders as it coincided with the founding date of the city of São Paulo.

However, the actual founding date is uncertain, as it is reported differently in various media. For the club, it took place on January 25, 1930. Some media outlets claim the foundation occurred on January 26, due to delays in drafting the bylaws, which caused the founding assembly to take place only on that day. However, that day was a Sunday. It can thus be concluded that the minutes were registered on January 27, as corroborated by the newspaper A Gazeta Esportiva and the International Federation of Association Football.

Sixty members of Club Athletico Paulistano contributed their 1929 Paulista championship players to create the new club, while Associação Atlética das Palmeiras provided its stadium, Chácara da Floresta. Preserving the traditions of the past, the new club's uniform featured red and black stripes in homage to both founding clubs. Its crest and shirt were designed by the German stylist Walter Ostrich, with the collaboration of Firmiano de Morais Pinto Filho, one of those present at the foundation. The name chosen to reflect the desire to establish a club that would represent the city in various spheres was none other than São Paulo Futebol Clube, which became known as São Paulo da Floresta only recently due to the location of its stadium. The first board of directors was composed of: Edgard de Souza Aranha (president), Alberto Caldas (first vice-president), Gastão Tachou (second vice-president), Benedito Montenegro (third vice-president), Luís de Oliveira Barros (first secretary), José Martins Costa (second secretary), João B. da Cunha Bueno (first treasurer), and Caio Luís Pereira de Souza (second treasurer).

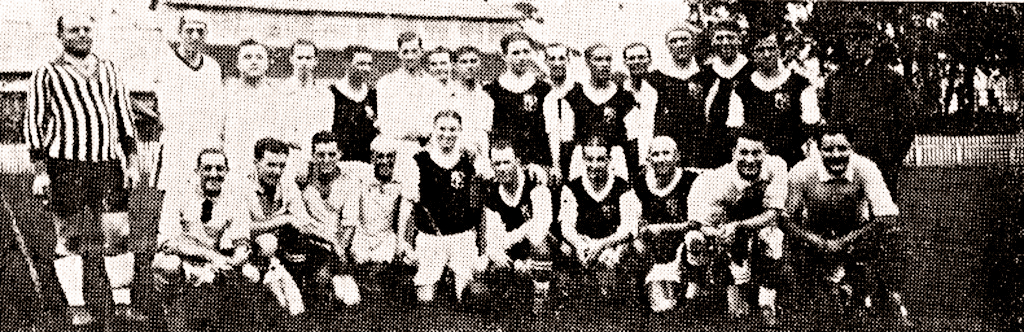
First training session of the team. On the left, the "A" team wearing the Paulistano shirt, and on the right, the "B" team wearing the Palmeiras shirt.

The early years of the club coincided with events that marked an era in Brazilian football. The year 1930 was the year of the first World Cup, and it was only from that year onward that a match began to be played in two halves of 45 minutes. It was only in 1933 that the first professional match in the country was played, with the São Paulo team being one of the protagonists alongside Santos.

Regarding this first professional match, it was during this game that the nickname of Santos, "peixe" (fish), was first mentioned. It was a provocation, before the start of the game, by the tricolor fans toward the Santos players, calling them "peixeiros" (fishmongers) in a derogatory manner. The Santos fans retorted by saying, "We are fishmongers, and with great honor!" From then on, the nickname was adopted by the Santos club, and the mascot, the Whale, was created.

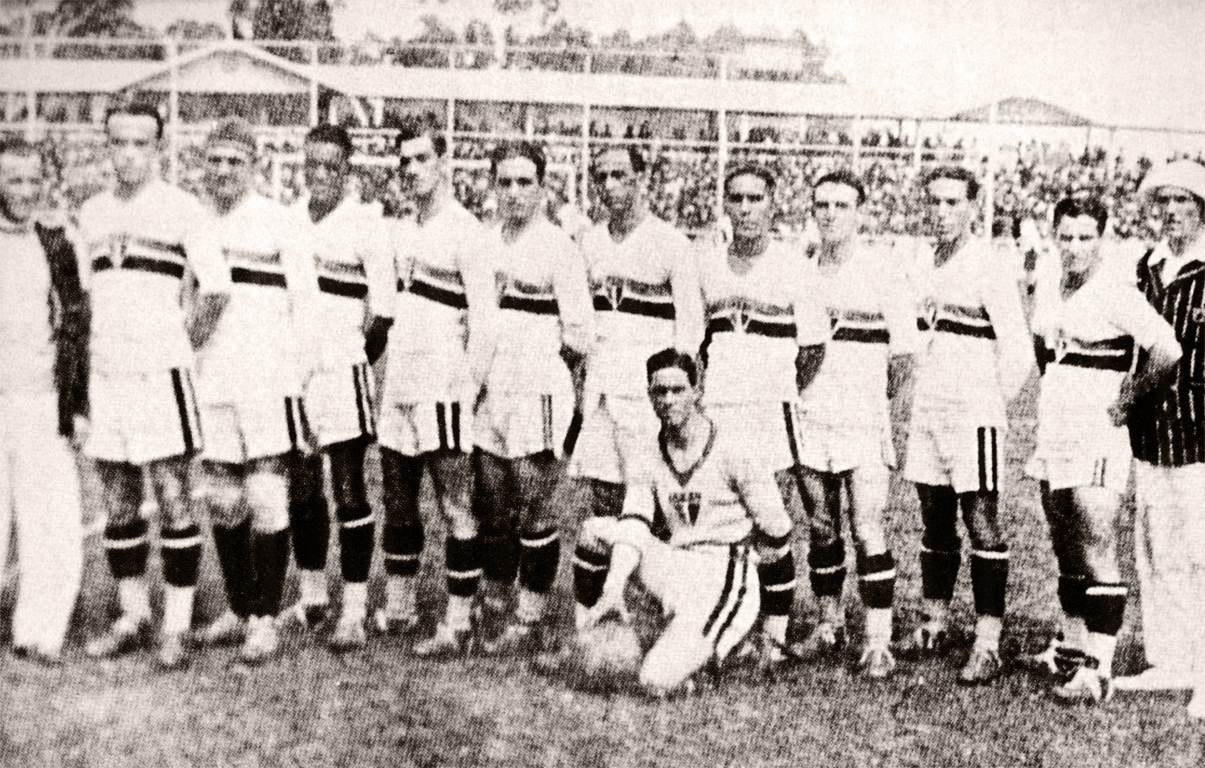
Players of the first title won by the club, the 1931 Paulista Championship.

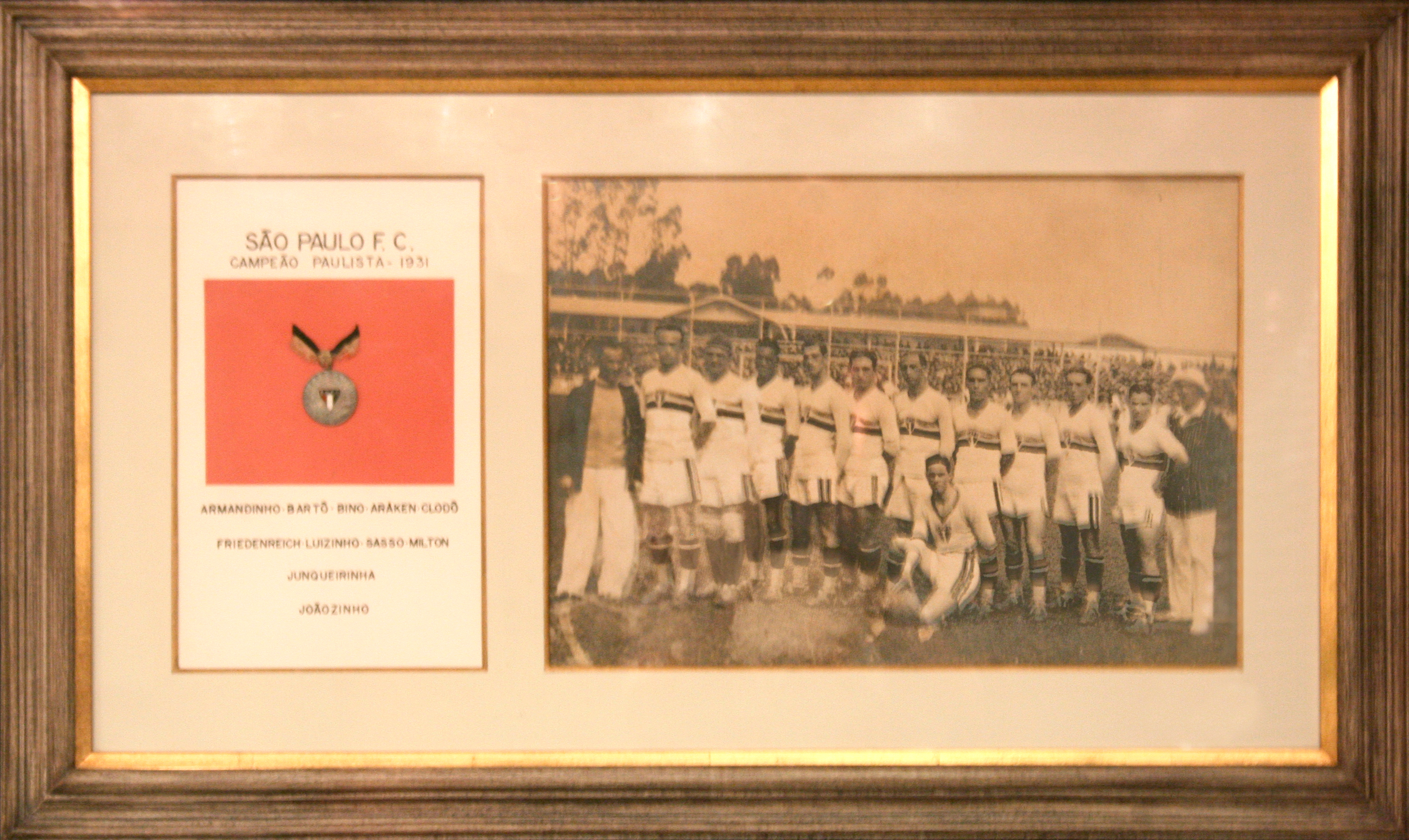
Frame with the medal and photo of the team that won the 1931 Paulista Championship for the club.

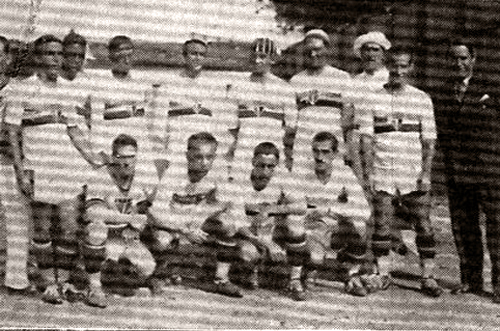
São Paulo FC team in 1932.

Since its inception, the club demonstrated a democratic stance, as it accepted players of any ethnicity, social class, or origin without restriction. It was also the only club in the city of São Paulo to have a former player—Roberto Gomes Pedrosa—as president. In terms of achievements, the Tricolor Paulista won the 1931 Paulista Championship in its second year of existence and finished as runner-up in 1930, 1932, 1933, and 1934. It was also runner-up in the 1933 Rio-São Paulo Tournament. Thus, the newly founded Tricolor Paulista was at the forefront of local football.

The club then purchased a new, luxurious headquarters located on Conselheiro Crispiniano Street (in the city center), a small palace known as "Trocadero," at a cost of 190 contos de réis. This debt was significant for the time, but the club, with a stadium like Chácara da Floresta and a valuable roster of players, was not deterred. However, some club directors, dissatisfied with the direction of football in the country, decided to merge with Clube de Regatas Tietê and dissolve the football department. Another group, in favor of the club's continuity and led by Paulo Sampaio, took the matter to court and, on April 23, 1935, challenged the board's right to merge the club with Tietê without consulting the members.

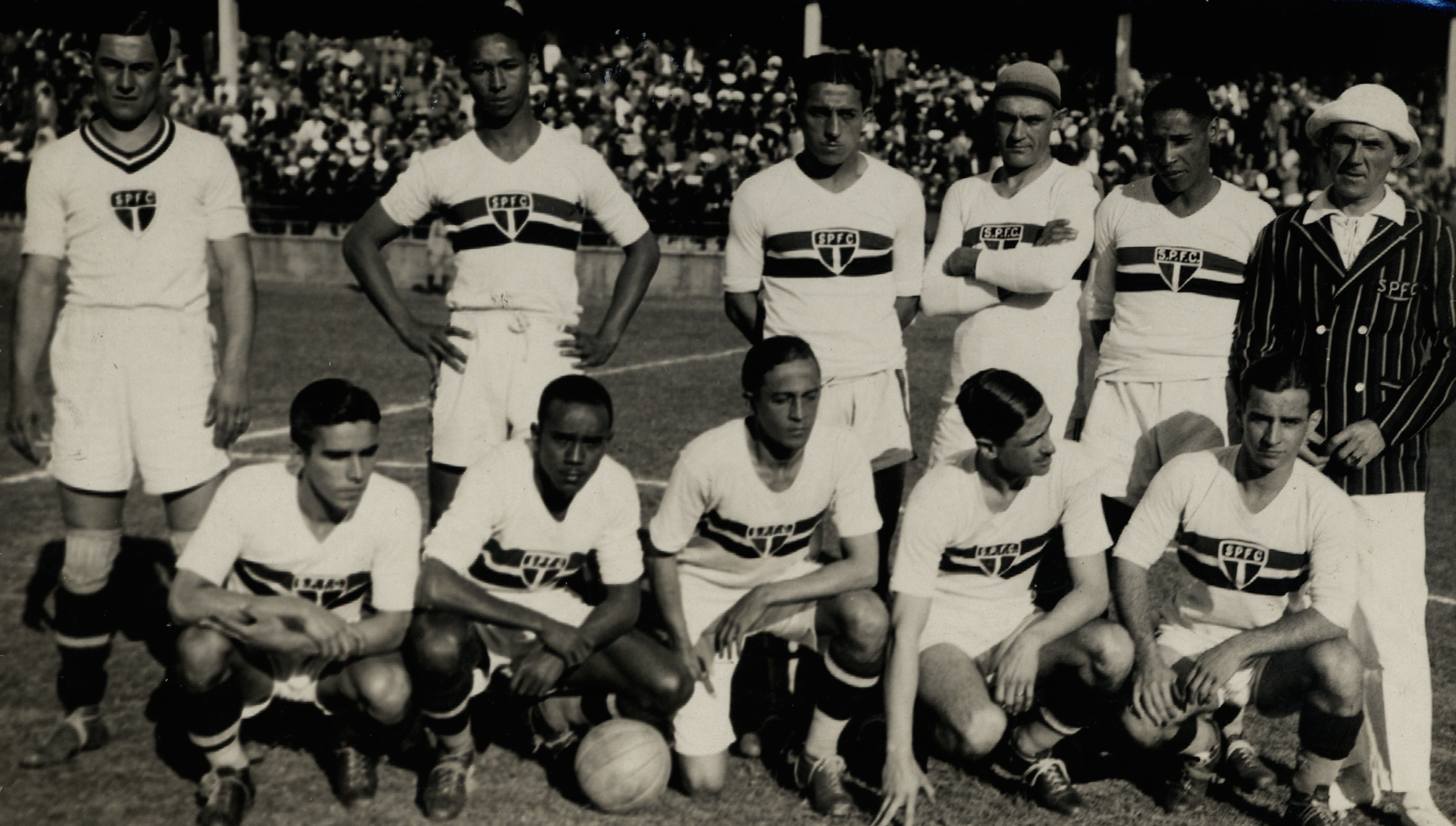
São Paulo team in 1933.

The players themselves were against what was happening. So much so that they banded together to form the short-lived Independente Esporte Clube. However, the remaining São Paulo players were lured by other clubs, and Independente was eventually dissolved.

During this period, the team won the 1931 Paulista Championship and the 1932 Torneio Início.

The members won their case even after the club's board presented its defense. The board had no choice but to call a general assembly. However, Article 2 of the club's bylaws at the time stated that only the "founding members," considered "owners" of the club and numbering two hundred, could participate in the assembly. As the majority were aligned with the board, the merger was approved on May 14, 1935. On that day, the football department was officially dissolved and disaffiliated from the APEA. With the merger, the administrative side was integrated into Tietê, which absorbed all physical assets and, in return, would settle the club's debts and was prohibited from using São Paulo's colors, uniforms, and symbols. Thus, Tietê-São Paulo was born.

However, some members, outraged by the merger with Clube de Regatas Tietê, decided to create the Grêmio Tricolor, an association that would refound the club on December 16, 1935, preserving the glories and traditions of the past.

== 1935 to 1939 ==
After the merger with Tietê, former members of the Tricolor Paulista, unwilling to accept what had happened, decided to keep their convictions about the club alive by founding the Grêmio Tricolor. Their efforts paid off, as on June 4, 1935, 235 former members established the Clube Atlético São Paulo. Even so, the dream was difficult to pursue without funds. But through daily meetings at the Mecca family's office and a café in the Pirapitingui gallery, São Paulo FC was reborn on December 16, 1935, in a meeting at the law office of Sílvio Freire, located in one of the rooms of building number 9-A on XI de Agosto Street—where Praça da Sé stands today. The first board of directors was composed of Manoel do Carmo Mecca (president), Alcides Borges (first vice-president), Francisco Pereira Carneiro (second vice-president), Éolo Campos (first secretary), Luís Felipe de Paula Lima (second secretary), Manoel de Arruda Nascimento (first treasurer), Isidoro Novaes (second treasurer), and Porfírio da Paz (general sports director).

On the 16th day of December 1935, in the city of São Paulo, at 8:00 p.m., in one of the rooms of building 9-A, XI de Agosto Street, in the presence of a large number of interested individuals who responded to an invitation made through the press by the Grêmio Tricolor board, an assembly was held with the purpose of founding São Paulo FC. As one of the directors of Grêmio Tricolor present at the meeting, Mr. Lieutenant José Porfírio da Paz, after explaining the reasons for calling the assembly, requested that one of those present be appointed to chair the proceedings. By unanimous decision, Mr. Lieutenant Porfírio da Paz was chosen, who, upon assuming the presidency of the meeting, selected Mr. Éolo Campos and Mr. Francisco Pereira Carneiro as secretaries. After thanking for his appointment, the President outlined the agenda, which followed this order: a) reading and discussion of the bylaws; b) election of the board; c) admission of members as founders; d) exemption from membership fees; e) calling a new assembly to elect the Deliberative and Fiscal Council; f) registration of the bylaws.

— Minutes of the club's refoundation meeting,

It fell to Porfírio da Paz to form a new squad for the now-impoverished club, which faced skepticism from those who doubted it could return to its former greatness. After compiling a list of players, he went to every radio station to raise funds for signings. Porfírio even spent his personal fortune and sold a significant portion of his assets to support the club. Still, the results were not encouraging, the funds raised were modest, and most of the initial players were from the outskirts and of very humble origins. While Porfírio worked to secure funds and players in the capital, president Manoel do Carmo Mecca and coach Del Debbio traveled to Curitiba, the Paraná capital, to sign the already well-known goalkeeper King, who would become the first black goalkeeper to play for a Paulista club. The club's first training session was a match against Clube Atlético Paulista at the Rua da Mooca field, with the tricolor winning 7–3. The new headquarters was inaugurated at Carlos Gomes Square, number 38, on January 24, 1936.

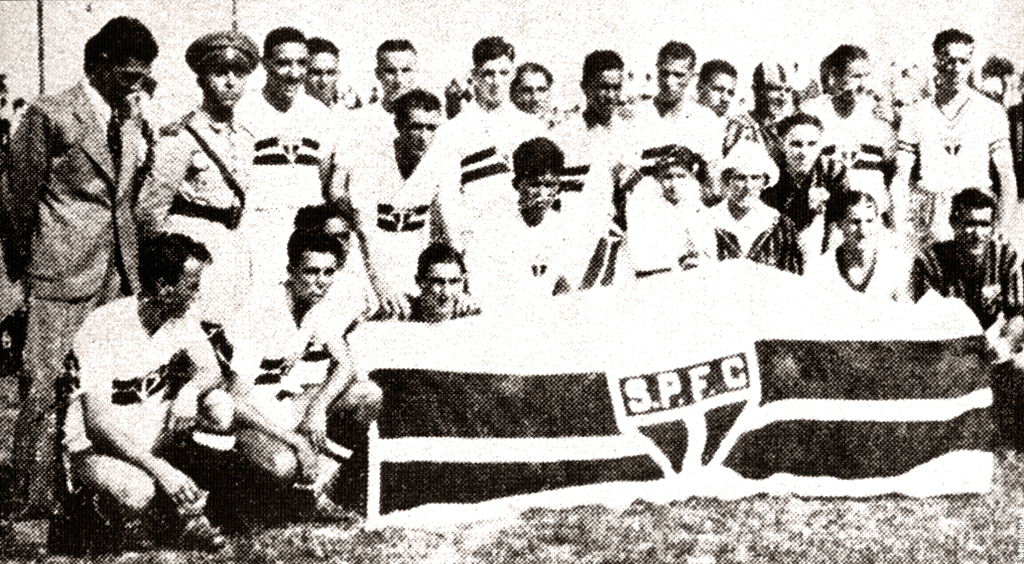
Squad of the club in its first match after refoundation.

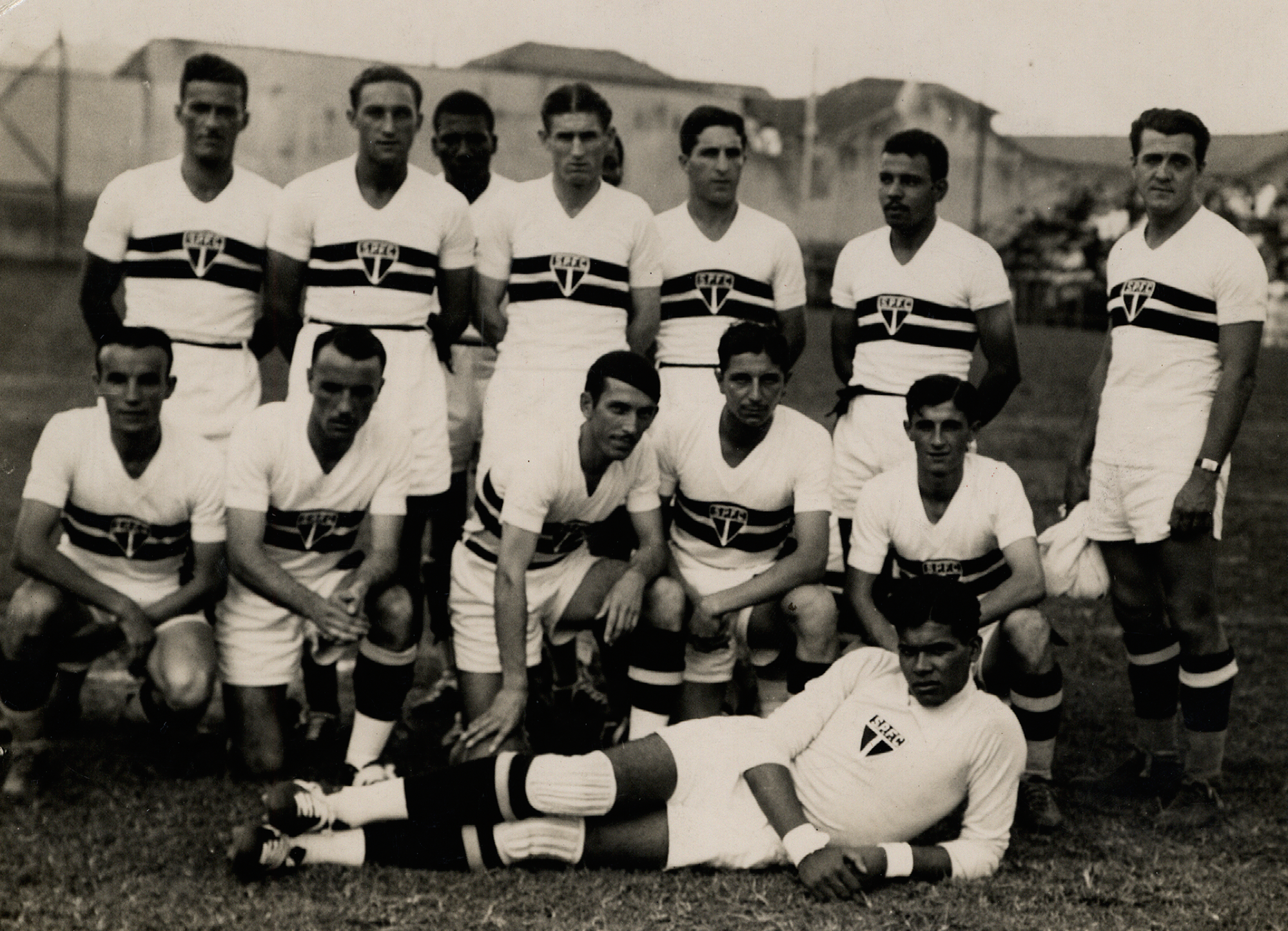
São Paulo team in 1936.

The club had intended to debut in 1935, but due to the merger and disaffiliation from APEA, this was not possible. Thus, the new club's debut was scheduled for January 25, 1936, against Portuguesa Santista, at the Estádio Antônio Alonso. On the same day, a celebration for the city's anniversary was taking place on Paulista Avenue, and a decree from the Education Secretariat prohibited events that could rival the parade. With little time before the match, Porfírio went to Paulista Avenue to persuade Dr. Cantídio Campos, then municipal education secretary, to authorize the game. Porfírio took the stage and argued in favor of the team bearing the city's name and colors. Cantídio accepted the arguments and authorized the opening of the gates and the match. However, at the time of heading to the stadium, no trams were running in the city. Once again, Porfírio rented cars with his own money to transport players and fans to the match.

In its early years of this new phase, the club was known by other teams and their fans as a team of "paupers." Furthermore, the press generally referred to the club as "poor," calling it "Júnior," "Club No. 2," and "São-Paulinho." In the view of much of the São Paulo population, the new entity could not achieve the glories of its predecessor or reach the same level as Corinthians and Palestra Itália. However, after so many obstacles and resurgences, it earned the nickname "Club of Faith" in 1937, coined by journalist Tomás Mazzoni, a moniker that endures to this day.

Recently, São Paulo FC Júnior emerged with the same ambitions as its predecessor. If the new São Paulo came into the world of football without the assets, fame, and prestige of its ancestors, it brought the greatest wealth: faith in its destiny and love for its present. Only faith could lead the current Tricolor to be born like any neighborhood club and quickly become an organization on the right path to progress in top-tier football. The Club of Faith, as the current São Paulo FC deserves to be called (...)

— Tomás Mazzoni,

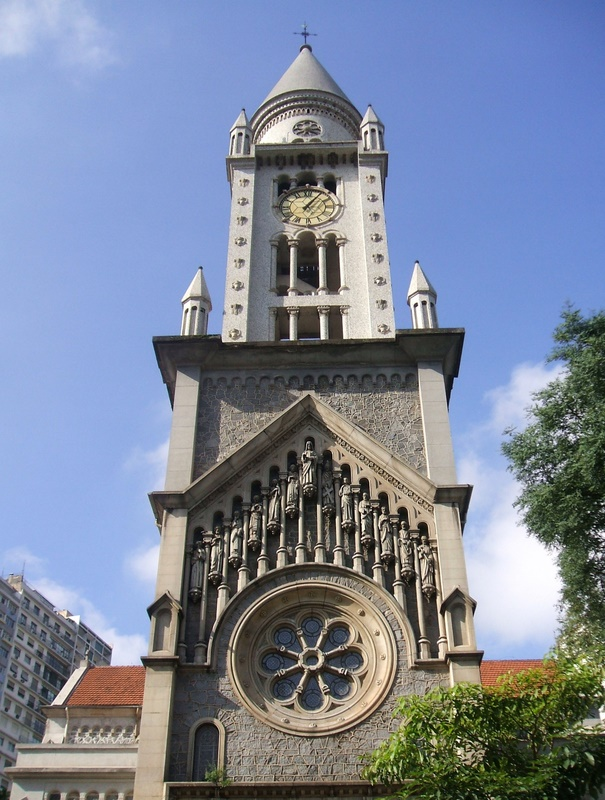
Tower of the Consolação Church, where half the team stayed.

At that time, the club had no members, revenue sources, or even assets. It trained and played wherever it was allowed. There was no place for team lodging, which had to be improvised, with half the squad staying at the home of president Frederico Menzen and the other half in bunk beds in the tower of the Consolação Church, the parish of Monsignor Bastos, a notable São Paulo supporter. Training sessions were sometimes held in the church's courtyard alongside the area where the Sodality of Our Lady played basketball. When available, the team trained at the Várzea do Glicério field, but with the condition of vacating the premises as soon as the field's owning teams arrived.

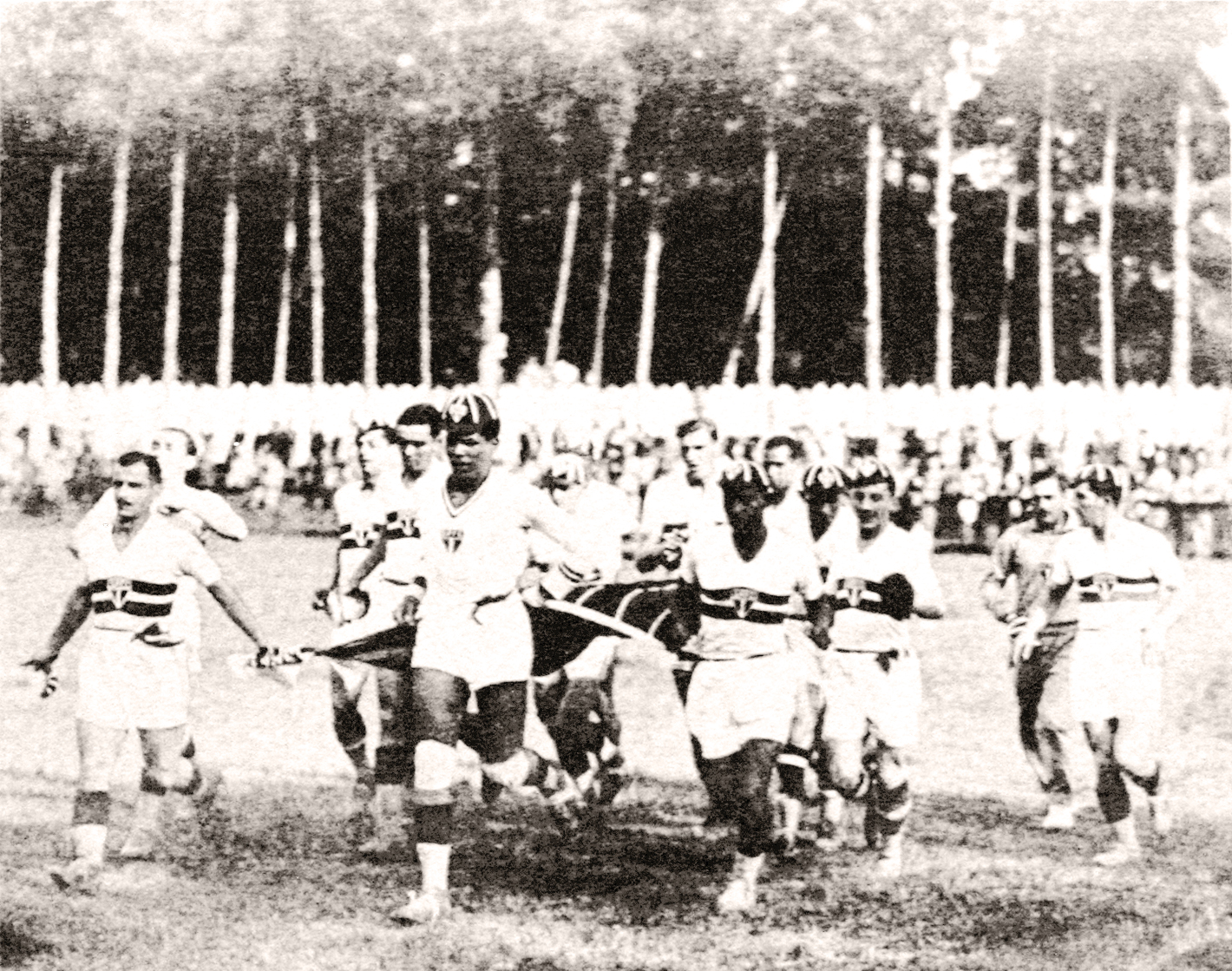
São Paulo team in 1938.

However, despite the determination and faith of its directors and the strong popular appeal inherited from Paulistano and Palmeiras, the São Paulo players, with rare exceptions, were technically weak. The team achieved only an eighth-place finish in the 1936 Paulista Championship and a seventh-place finish in the following year. This would be addressed with a new merger: in 1938, the Clube Atlético Estudante Paulista, founded in May 1935 by São Paulo dissidents, went on a tour to Chile and Peru, during which the manager absconded with the collected funds, leaving the club on the brink of bankruptcy. São Paulo, aware of the situation, proposed a merger, as Estudante had talented players and owned the Estádio Antônio Alonso; São Paulo, on the other hand, had a fanbase, charisma, and balanced finances. The question of the club's name arose. The tricolors argued that they were older, had an established tradition, and carried the name and colors of the state. These arguments prevailed, on the condition that the new president be a neutral figure connected to both clubs, Piragibe Nogueira. Another decision was that members of both clubs would have their membership numbers reset to facilitate the merger. São Paulo then raised the funds to settle the debt, and the agreement was finalized. On August 25, 1938, the new team debuted, already featuring half of Estudante’s players, including Roberto Gomes Pedrosa, a future club president. The new headquarters was established at Dom José de Barros Street, number 337, in República.

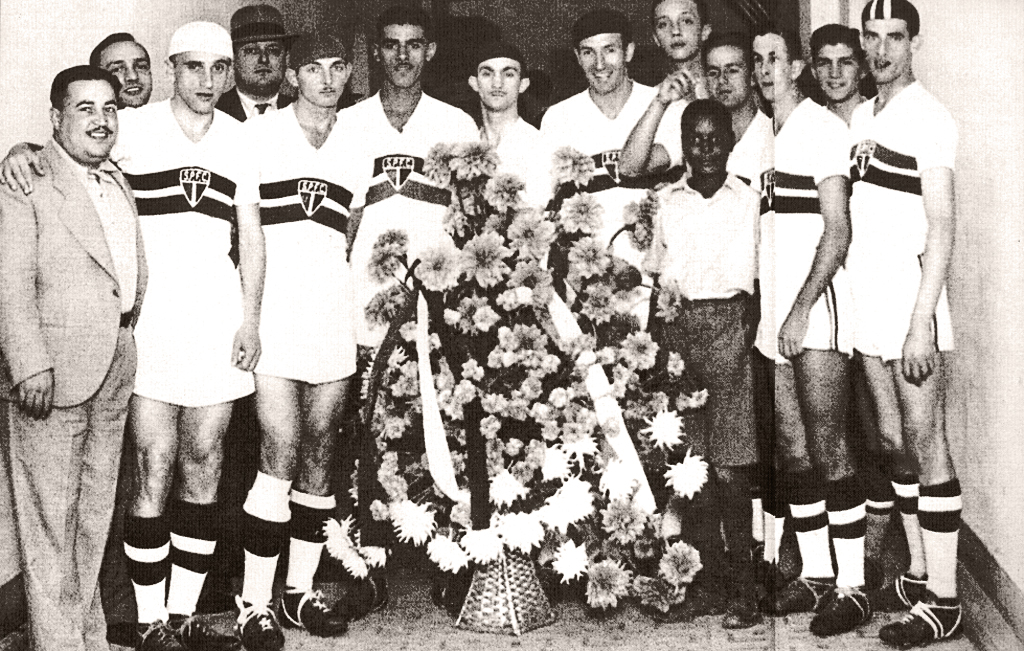
Photo of the tricolor squad after finishing as runner-up in the 1938 championship.

Weeks before the merger, on July 3, 1938, São Paulo held the "São Paulo FC Festival," offering the Henrique Mündel Trophy to the winner to raise funds, despite the club’s finances already being stabilized.

After the merger, with a capable team, the tricolor reached the runner-up position in the 1938 Paulista Championship—it could have been champion if not for a controversial handball goal by Corinthians’ forward Carlinhos, validated by the referee (the draw gave the title to Corinthians). In 1939, the players were still adjusting, finishing only fifth in the Paulista Championship that year. During this period, the club began to encourage the practice of sports other than football.

São Paulo was a pioneer in organized supporter groups. In 1939, a student, Manoel Raymundo Paes de Almeida, founded the Grêmio São-Paulino in Mooca, which later became TUSP—Torcida Uniformizada do São Paulo. It was an enthusiastic supporter group that held its own celebrations with streamers and confetti.

== 1940 to 1949 ==
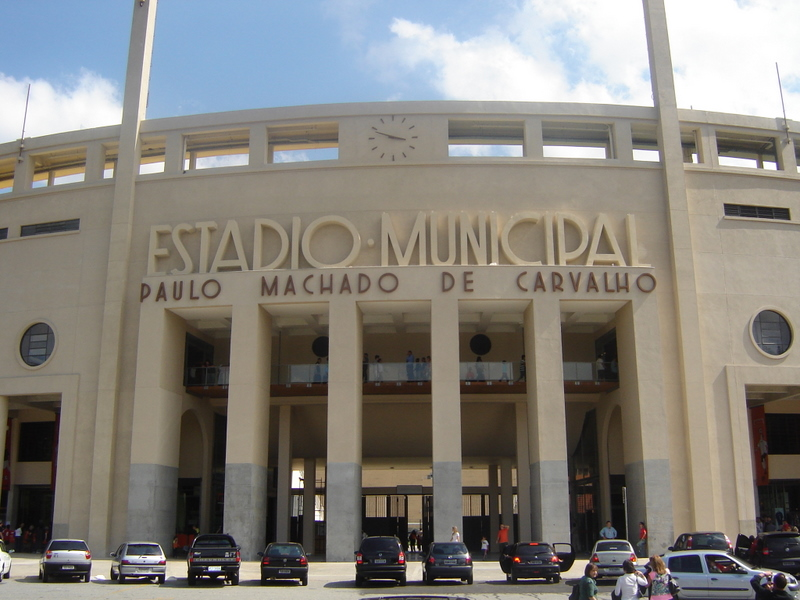
Pacaembu Stadium, where the club earned the nickname "The Most Beloved."

After April 27, 1940, with the inauguration of the Pacaembu Stadium, Paulista football was never the same. From that date, the city boasted what was then the largest and most modern stadium in Latin America, with a capacity for seventy thousand fans. This shifted the epicenter of football from Rio de Janeiro to São Paulo, making it not only a sporting event but a social one as well. It was during the Vargas dictatorship, when displays of state flags were prohibited.

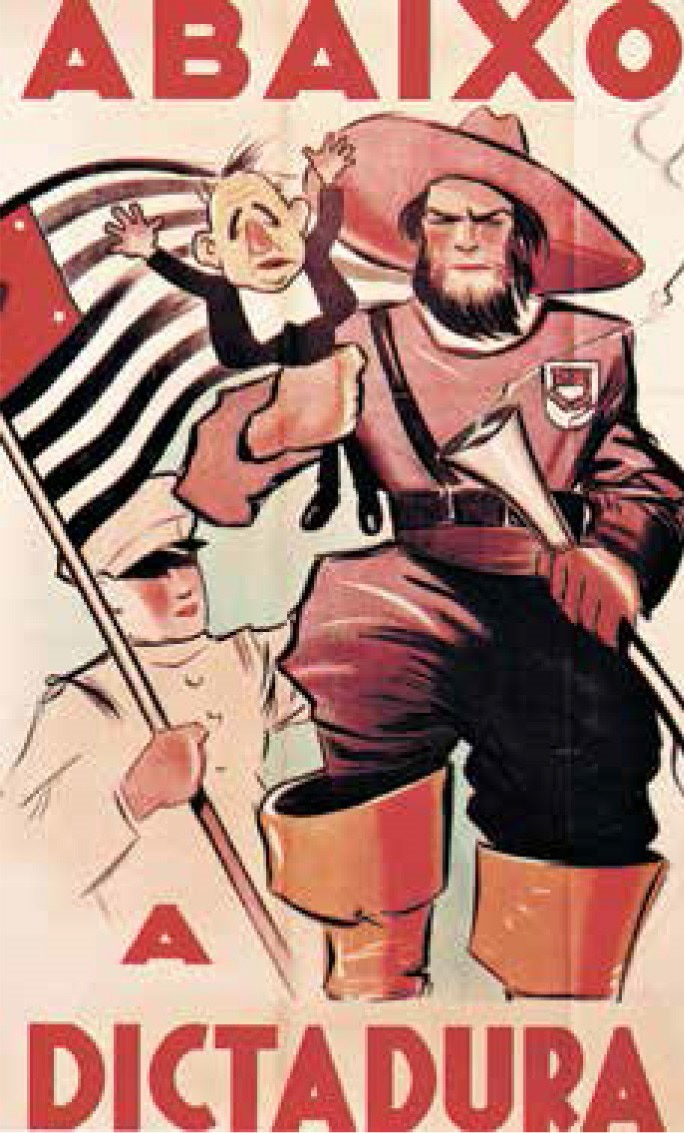
Paulista poster against the dictatorship.

People began arriving early, around 10:00 a.m., and at the time of the festivities, it is estimated that the crowd was between sixty thousand and eighty thousand. Many authorities were present in the honorary stands, including Getúlio Vargas, the president of the Republic, who was not particularly admired by Paulistas. The festivities began with a parade of delegations from Argentina, Uruguay, Peru, Paraná, Minas Gerais, Rio de Janeiro, the interior of São Paulo, and the city clubs. The Corinthians and Palestra Itália teams were the first to enter, receiving enthusiastic applause, but nothing compared to the entrance of the Tricolor Paulista. The entire stadium and radio broadcasters, outraged by the censorship, circumvented it by standing to applaud the tricolor delegation—which carried the name and colors of the Paulista flag—as a response to the president, who had been unpopular in São Paulo since the 1932 Constitutionalist Revolution. The crowd stood to salute the delegation and, pointing to the stand where Getúlio Vargas was, shouted the team’s name.

The sporting public itself demonstrated how beloved São Paulo FC is, as, despite presenting a small group, it received warm applause, with its name deliberately cheered.

— Folha da Manhã,

The next day, the newspaper A Gazeta Esportiva featured the headline "The Most Beloved Club in the City" on its front page. Some time later, the DEIP—State Department of Press and Propaganda—held a public contest among fans of all the era’s clubs to determine which was truly the most beloved by the city’s citizens. With Corinthians and Palestra Itália as favorites—having the largest fanbases—the winner was São Paulo, with 5,523 votes, more than the combined votes of its two main competitors: 2,671 for Corinthians and 2,593 for Palestra. Thus, São Paulo officially became "The Most Beloved," a slogan that the club still uses today.

In the same year, on May 19, São Paulo won the first official title at Pacaembu, the Torneio Início of the Paulista Championship, against archrival Corinthians. However, in the tournament for the state trophy, it finished only sixth. In 1941, the team reached the state championship runner-up position, once again contending for the title.

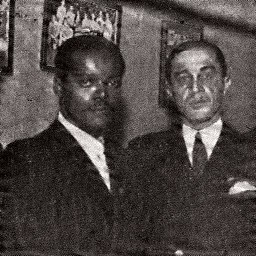
Leônidas da Silva alongside another tricolor idol, Friedenreich.

In 1942, São Paulo would experience a turning point in its history with Leônidas da Silva. Already with some national fame, he played a match in December 1932 for the Brazilian national team against the Uruguay team, scoring both goals in a 2–1 victory. For his performance, he earned the nickname "Black Diamond." His other nickname, "Rubber Man," came from his performance against Czechoslovakia, where, in addition to scoring two goals, he executed his most famous move, the bicycle kick. Leônidas debuted on May 24, 1942, against Corinthians and ended the championship elevating the team to third place, with hopes of a promising future. Leônidas was a turning point in São Paulo's history, as the club had only won one state championship, in 1931, and from the moment he debuted, São Paulo amassed several titles.

Due to the large crowd (70,281 people, the all-time Pacaembu attendance record) and the significance of this debut match, the classic between the Tricolor and the Alvinegro Paulista became known as Majestoso, a nickname given by A Gazeta Esportiva journalist Tomás Mazzoni.

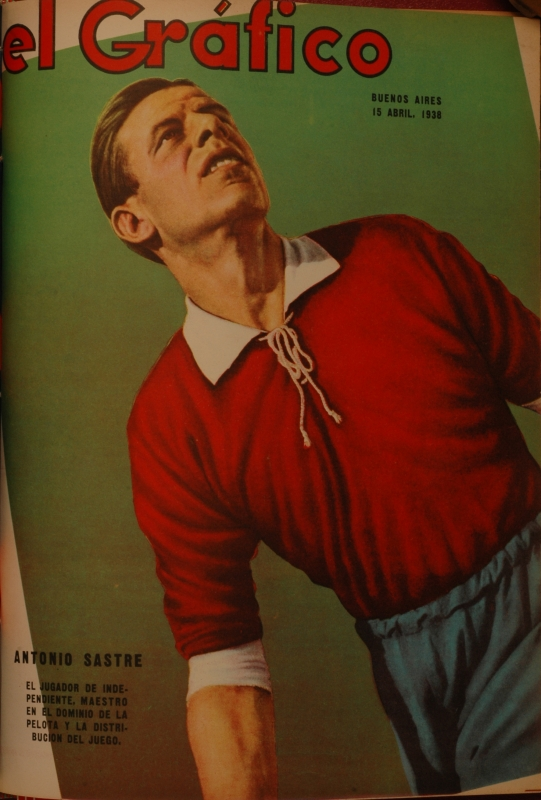
Antonio Sastre, an Argentine player who was part of the tricolor squad from 1943 to 1946.

In that same year, Brazil was going through a delicate historical moment. Amid World War II, anti-Italian sentiment flared in the country due to Italy’s alignment with the Axis. In this context, the government imposed harsh repression on countries opposing the Allies. As a result, German and Italian institutions were closed, renamed, or directly intervened by the government. Among the clubs, Cruzeiro Esporte Clube, also called Palestra Itália, changed its name. The green-and-whites, however, believe the persecution was instigated by São Paulo, which was allegedly interested in taking over the Estádio Palestra Itália. Oberdan Cattani, Palestra’s goalkeeper, once claimed that São Paulo controlled the Paulista Federation and acted accordingly. However, the Tricolor Paulista was still a lesser team at the time and Getúlio Vargas held little sympathy for the club after the events at Pacaembu’s inauguration. In the same year, São Paulo partnered with the Deutsch Sportive—which also faced prejudice due to its German origin—and gained a training field, the Canindé. Although it was a partnership, the Canindé land—equivalent to seventy thousand square meters—was purchased for the equivalent of 740 contos de réis. São Paulo would become known as the Canindé Tricolor.

At the meeting to set the 1943 Paulista Championship calendar at the Paulista Federation headquarters, a Corinthians director remarked that the meeting was unnecessary, as tossing a coin would determine the champion: heads for Corinthians, tails for Palmeiras—formerly Palestra Itália. When questioned about São Paulo by the tricolor representative, the director replied that if the coin landed on its edge, São Paulo would be the champion—and if it stayed in the air, Portuguesa. Until that moment, the Tricolor was seen as a mid-tier team that did not rival the aforementioned competitors. Thus began the championship, with São Paulo determined to break the hegemony of Corinthians and Palmeiras. In the final match, against Palmeiras, São Paulo held a goalless draw and clinched the title: the coin landed on its edge. Following this achievement, the Grêmio São-Paulino held a nighttime parade with a float featuring a coin standing on its edge to collect the Taça dos Invictos at the A Gazeta Esportiva building.

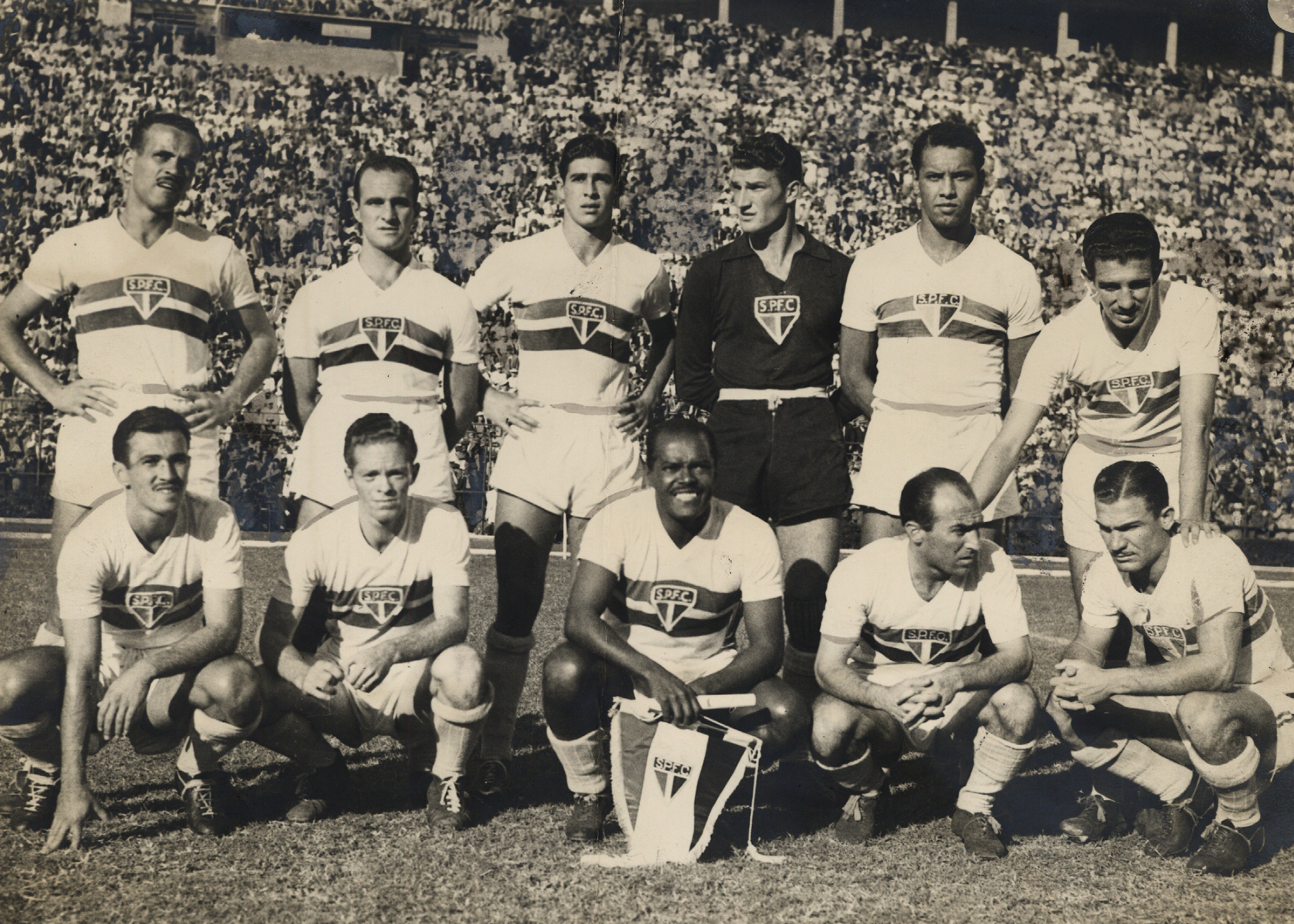
São Paulo team, 1949. National Archives.

The 1940s were the most successful decade for the tricolor in terms of titles up to that point: five titles, including two back-to-back championships—1945 Paulista/1946 Paulista and 1948 Paulista/1949 Paulista—and an unbeaten title in 1946. This team became known as the "Steamroller"—when it took the field, only the score was unknown, as victory was assured—and it helped establish São Paulo as a sports association, as the club rapidly developed numerous activities from this period onward.

With São Paulo’s hegemony, coupled with the accusation regarding the takeover of Palestra Itália and the title disputes between the clubs, the classic gained significance and was nicknamed, once again by Tomás Mazzoni, the Choque-Rei. It was also from this decade that the club, alongside Corinthians and Palmeiras, formed the so-called Trio de Ferro.

During this period, departments for athletics, fencing, boxing, volleyball, and chess were created, all in 1943., as well as basketball. Some of these, however, were not very successful and closed after a few years, such as fencing, chess, and volleyball, with the latter resuming activities in the mid-1970s. Among the many departments created, athletics stands out, as in its second year, 1944, it won a series of fourteen Paulista titles, which continued until 1957. From 1961, it would reclaim these titles until 1966, totaling twenty championships in 25 years.

== 1950 to 1959 ==
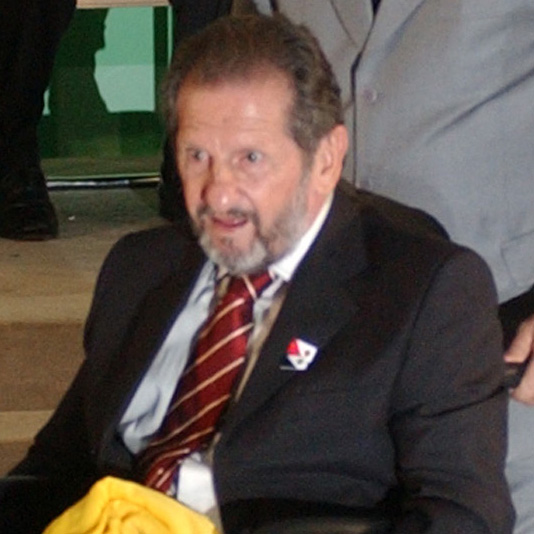
De Sordi honored for the 50th anniversary of the 1958 World Cup victory.

The 1950s began with high expectations for the team that had dominated the previous decade. Additionally, on January 4, 1950, Leônidas scored his last goal for the club and retired after three more matches on January 21. The team's performance in the absence of its star player was a subject of keen interest. At the end of the previous decade, a movement to build a stadium worthy of the club’s achievements gained momentum. The then-president Cícero Pompeu de Toledo led the group in favor of the stadium, arguing that the club could not only win titles but also needed to grow its assets. Many, including some within the club, opposed the construction, arguing it was a risky endeavor that could severely harm the club’s finances, as the project aimed not just to build a large stadium but the largest private stadium in the world.

Do the difficult now and the impossible a little later.

— Cícero Pompeu de Toledo,

The original idea was to build the stadium on the Canindé land itself, but with the construction of the Marginal Tietê, two-thirds of the land—about 20,000 square meters—were expropriated by the city hall, and building a stadium there was ruled out. With this initial setback, Luís Campos Aranha told Pompeu de Toledo that he knew someone who could reorganize the club to make the stadium possible. That person was Laudo Natel, financial director of Bradesco and a São Paulo supporter. To secure a bank loan, São Paulo needed to settle its debts. To this end, Natel suggested selling the club’s only asset, the Canindé. The training field was sold to Wadih Sadi, a club counselor, with the condition that the club could continue training there until another location was found.

We cannot be a club of eleven shirts, one flag, and many debts haunting us.

— Laudo Natel,

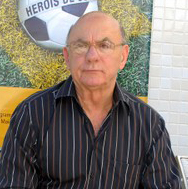
Dino Sani, one of the heroes of the 1958 World Cup victory, played for the club from 1954 to 1961.

With the debts cleared and the loan secured, the club sought a location that met the requirements, quickly selecting a flooded terrain in the Ibirapuera neighborhood, where the Ibirapuera Park now stands. Mayor Armando de Arruda Pereira approved the use of the land and sent a proposal to the City Council for official approval. However, Jânio Quadros, president of the council, opposed and vetoed the project. The solution was to build the stadium far from the city center, in an area then known as Jardim Leonor, which later became the Morumbi neighborhood. The area, uninhabited and lacking infrastructure, was being subdivided by the Aricanduva real estate company, and in December 1951, São Paulo, through Luís Aranha, secured a donation of land originally intended for parks and gardens. The donation was formalized on August 4, 1952, in exchange for the purchase of part of the land. The city hall mediated the process and imposed certain construction conditions. On August 15, the cornerstone was blessed by Monsignor Bastos, and the deed of possession was signed by Pompeu de Toledo. On the same day, a pro-stadium committee, chaired by Cícero Pompeu de Toledo, was formed, independent of the club’s board and dedicated solely to the stadium.

Even before the project was chosen, season tickets were already being sold by goalkeeper José Poy of his own initiative, as the board only intended to use his image. Poy was highly successful, selling 8,000 of the 12,000 season tickets available.

Many projects were submitted to the committee, including one from a Soviet construction company, Antonov & Solnnerkevic, which proposed a transparent and removable roof for the entire stadium. However, the chosen project was that of João Batista Vilanova Artigas, a renowned architect from the Paulista School, mainly due to its capacity for 150,000 people. Construction began in 1953, with land stabilization, gallery construction, and field drainage.

The stadium’s name was yet to be decided: "9 de Julho," in homage to the 1932 Constitutionalist Revolution, and even "Paulistão" were considered, but in 1957, Cícero Pompeu de Toledo fell ill and stepped down. Sensing he would not live much longer, councilors gathered signatures to name the stadium after its visionary and greatest advocate, Estádio Cícero Pompeu de Toledo. In 1958, Cícero died, but he knew his dream would come to fruition. With his death, a new committee was formed, this time led by Laudo Natel. Construction proceeded firmly, overcoming immense challenges, as no public funds were provided for the project.

From 1952 to 1959, the club allocated all its funds to the stadium but still managed to field competitive teams with star players, winning the Paulista Championships of 1953 and 1957, the latter marking the farewell of Teixeirinha and featuring the experience of Rio native Zizinho, then 35 years old, on the field and Hungarian coach Béla Guttmann on the bench.

The 1953 Paulista Championship earned the club the title of "IV Centenary Champion" of the city of São Paulo, as the title was only decided on January 24, 1954, one day before the city’s 400th anniversary, making the team the legitimate Paulista champion of the anniversary celebrations.

São Paulo also finished as runner-up in the Paulista Championships of 1950, 1952, 1956, and 1958. Starting with the 1956 championship, lost to Santos, the classic between the two teams was nicknamed San-São by journalist Tommaso Mazzoni.

The year 1952 was also fruitful for the club’s athletics, specifically in the triple jump event, as Adhemar Ferreira da Silva, an athlete developed by the club in 1947, set the world record in the category at the 1952 Olympics in Helsinki, a feat repeated at the 1955 Pan American Games in Mexico. These two records and their respective achievements were immortalized in the club’s crest with two gold stars in 1955 and later on the uniform in 1997.

== 1960 to 1969 ==
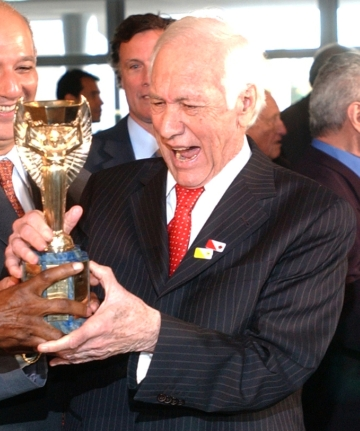
Bellini, captain of the 1958 World Cup team, played for São Paulo in the 1960s.

The 1960s were marked by the dominance of Santos led by Pelé, which won nearly every competition it entered. Compounding the issue was the unresolved situation regarding the completion of São Paulo's stadium.

The club lacked the funds to complete the construction, and one solution was to inaugurate the stadium before it was fully finished to generate revenue from ticket sales and rentals to other clubs. Thus, on October 2, 1960, in front of 64,748 spectators, the Cícero Pompeu de Toledo Stadium was inaugurated with a match against Sporting from Portugal.

With the stadium now able to host matches, the club sought new ways to raise funds for its completion. One method was the Carnê Paulistão, a type of lottery created by television presenter and club supporter Hélio Setti from Rede Excelsior. It awarded prizes on television to those who kept up with their ticket payments, similar to the current Baú da Felicidade. Other sources of funding included partnerships, commercial exchanges, and financial loans, as well as the sale of patrimonial and social memberships, which helped raise funds for both the stadium's completion and the development of the club's social facilities. Toward the end of the construction, the city government proposed exchanging the new stadium for the Pacaembu Stadium, to which Laudo Natel promptly replied that "the São Paulo fan's dream does not fit in Pacaembu."

Due to the stadium's construction, the club experienced its longest title drought between 1957 and 1970, totaling thirteen years without major titles. During this period, the club won the Rio-São Paulo Tournament in 1958, the Pentagonal de Guadalajara (Mexico) in 1960, the Quadrangular de Cali (Colombia) in 1960, the São Paulo Second Division Championship in 1960 and 1962, the Small World Cup (Venezuela) in 1963, the Triangular Tournament of El Salvador (El Salvador) in 1964, the Florence Tournament (Italy) in 1964, and the Colombino Huelva Trophy (Spain) in 1969, totaling nine titles. Even so, this title drought was the shortest among its state rivals.

While the football team struggled to win titles, the boxing section enjoyed its most successful period. Spanning the 1940s, 1950s, and 1960s, the golden era of boxing was anchored by the Zumbano/Jofre family boxing academy, where most athletes were trained by Aristides Kid Jofre, father of Éder Jofre. During this time, the academy produced fighters who became famous and won Brazilian, South American, and world titles. In 1960, Éder Jofre won his first world title for São Paulo, the World Boxing Association (WBA) Bantamweight title. Two years later, in 1962, he won the Unified Bantamweight World Championship.

== 1970 to 1979 ==
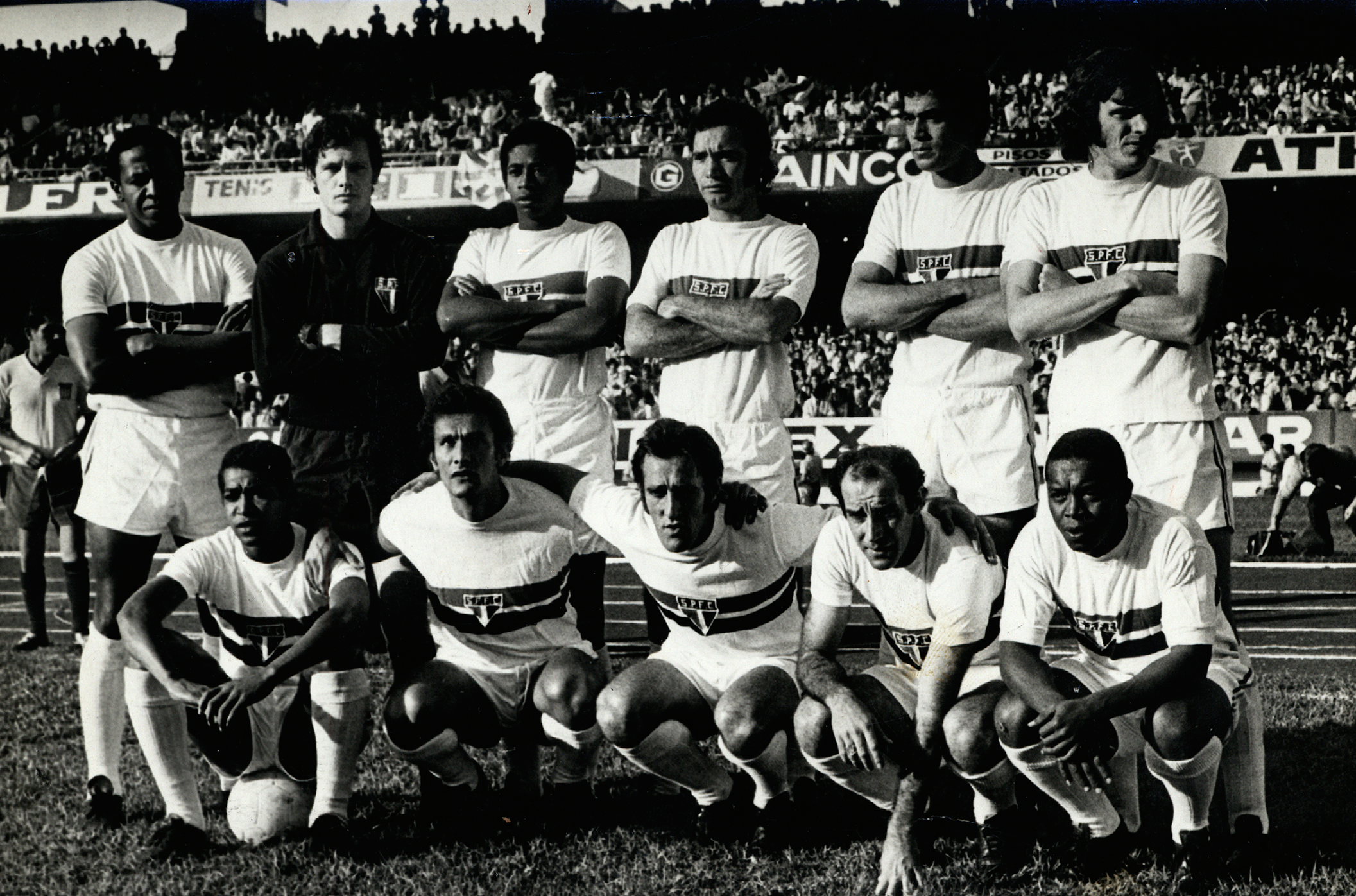
São Paulo team, 1971. National Archives.

The largest private stadium in the world at the time was complete, allowing the club to refocus on its football team. As a result, they signed the midfielder Édson Cegonha, the center-forward Toninho Guerreiro, the right-back Pablo Forlán, and the midfielder Gérson, forming a very strong team, although it would require until 1970 for the squad to reach its full potential and cohesion.

Following these signings, the stadium was to be definitively inaugurated. On January 25, 1970, the final inauguration took place. However, days before the match, construction debris, including wood, remained on the field, and the company responsible for its removal quoted a 40-day timeline. A club director with contacts in the military learned they needed firewood and proposed that the club would donate the wood if the military could remove it in a single day. The deal was struck, and the wood was cleared.

The scale of the stadium’s construction was impressive. It used fifty thousand cubic meters of concrete, four hundred thousand bags of cement, and six thousand tons of iron. The area designated for the public spanned 64,450 square meters.

The match against Porto from Portugal was a turning point, as fans and directors pressed then-president Laudo Natel about the title drought. He consistently responded that having a team without assets was pointless and promised that once the stadium was built, he would assemble a competitive team to win a title within one or two years—a promise fulfilled in the year of the inauguration and repeated the following year.

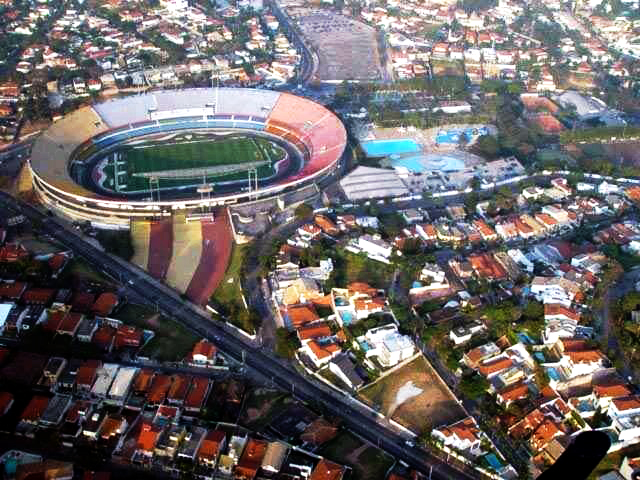
Aerial view of the Morumbi Stadium and part of its surrounding neighborhood.

The stadium also helped dispel claims that its location in the Morumbi neighborhood would remain undeveloped. The area, previously characterized by a state of complete absence of urban infrastructure, has undergone a substantial transformation, with the introduction of essential services such as sewage, water, and electricity. Presently, Morumbi is regarded as one of the most exclusive and sophisticated neighborhoods within the city, boasting some of the most exorbitant real estate prices in the capital on a per-square-meter basis. Due to its location, the stadium became known as Morumbi, and the team, previously called São Paulo da Floresta and Tricolor do Canindé, became the Tricolor do Morumbi.

Thus, in the 1970s, São Paulo overcame challenges in various aspects. In 1971, it achieved a runner-up finish in the Brazilian Championship—its best result up to that point—and qualified for the Libertadores of 1972, finishing fourth. From the start of the decade, the club improved its performance, winning the São Paulo State Championships of 1970, 1971, and 1975, as well as the unprecedented Brazilian Championship of 1977. There were also runner-up finishes in the Brazilian Championship of 1973 and the Libertadores of 1974.

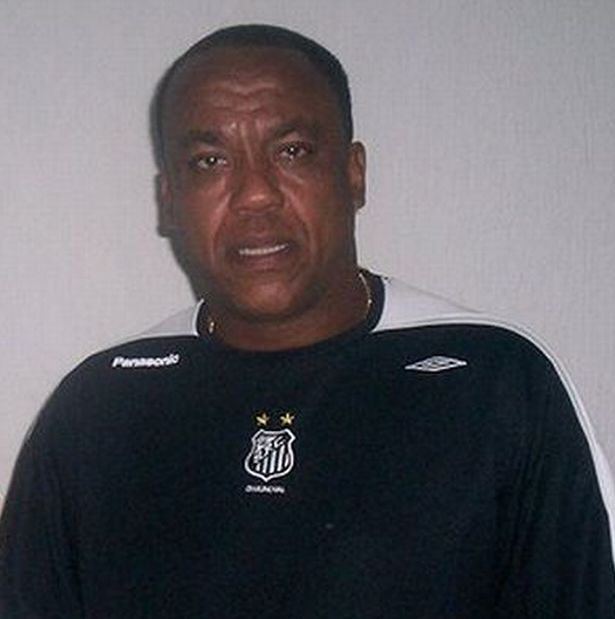
Serginho Chulapa, the club’s all-time top scorer.

The first Brazilian Championship title was arguably the club’s most unlikely, as experts considered the team average and not among the favorites, despite having the country’s best coach, Rubens Minelli, and a squad with nine players who had played or would play for the Brazil national team. The team played the entire championship winning when it needed to and losing when it could afford to—suffering only two defeats in the first two phases—until reaching the decisive matches. In the third phase, they lost only to Botafogo de Ribeirão Preto, and even then, with a wrongly disallowed goal that led to the suspension of striker Serginho Chulapa after he kicked the assistant referee who had nullified the goal. In the semifinals, they overcame the tournament’s dark horse, Operário de Campo Grande, with a 3–0 home win and a 1–0 away loss.

Thus, Atlético Mineiro and São Paulo reached the final, which was a single match at the Governador Magalhães Pinto Stadium, with Atlético Mineiro favored to win. In the final, both teams were without their star players—Serginho for São Paulo and Reinaldo for Atlético. Following the coach’s orders, São Paulo employed tight marking, stifling Atlético’s play while creating the best scoring chances. The match went to extra time, but no goals were scored. In the penalty shootout, the key was the mind games of São Paulo’s goalkeeper Waldir Peres, who unsettled Atlético’s penalty takers, leading to three misses and securing the title for the Tricolor do Morumbi.

However, in 1978, São Paulo failed to win the Paulista Championship against Santos, which was decided in mid-1979, and soon after, opted out of the Brazilian Championship of 1979 to focus on the Paulista Championship, where it finished only seventh, signaling the need for change.

Éder Jofre had already achieved glory with two world titles, but two controversial points losses in 1965 and 1966 led him to retire from boxing. In 1969, Éder surprised everyone by returning to the ring, this time in the featherweight division. Despite moving up a weight class, he achieved an incredible streak of 25 victories, one of which earned him the World Boxing Council (WBC) Featherweight World Championship title in 1973.

== 1980 to 1989 ==
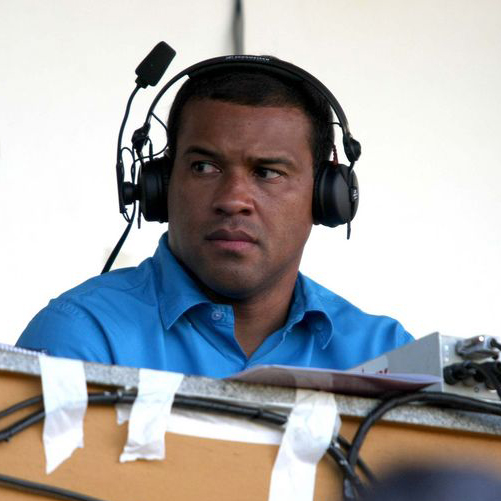
The group known as the Menudos do Morumbi included Müller in its squad.

The year 1980 began with an unwanted record: Brazil had not won the Saint Silvester Road Race in 34 years. São Paulo’s runner José João da Silva ended this drought, winning the title and setting Brazilian records for the 5,000 and 10,000 meters, which stood for sixteen years. In 1985, after undergoing knee surgery and breaking an arm, he won the race again, wearing the Tricolor do Morumbi colors.

In football, the team started the 1980s strongly, winning back-to-back São Paulo State Championships in 1980 and 1981 and finishing as runner-up in the Brazilian Championship of 1981, earning the nicknames Máquina Tricolor and Tricolaço. Starting in 1981, the club engaged in a series of exchanges with American teams, beginning with Cosmos, which brought defender Oscar to the club. Also in 1981, the club had the honor of playing with the number 10 Rivellino in a friendly against the Saudi Arabian national team. During this period, the club underwent a major overhaul of its board of directors, who began managing the club ambitiously with the goal of elevating it to European standards. To this end, several players, including Müller and Chicão, were gradually sold, while others, such as Renato and Oscar, were signed.

It’s more than Tricolor, it’s Tricolor with steel, it’s Tricolaço!

— Team slogan inspired by a tire commercial,

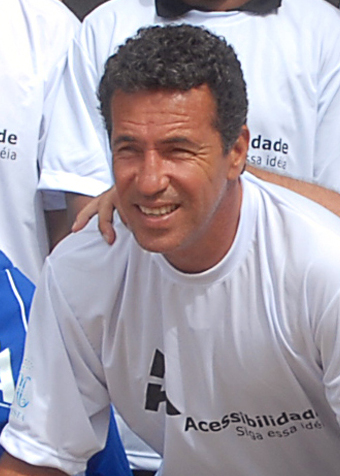
Careca, who scored the equalizing goal in the 1986 Brazilian Championship final.

The team started 1982 well, but a runner-up finish in the Paulista Championship lost to Corinthians signaled the start of a transitional phase. Serginho Chulapa transferred to Santos in 1983, and the board signed the young and talented Careca in his place, but the struggles continued with another runner-up finish, again to Corinthians. In 1984, coach Cilinho began reshaping the team, and in the following year, he promoted several youth players, including Müller and Silas. After a surprising comeback in a draw against Grêmio, the team earned the nickname Menudos do Morumbi, in reference to the Puerto Rican band Menudo. Notably, the club also signed the "King of Rome," Falcão, as the major acquisition of 1985. With this team, the club won the Brazilian Championship in 1986 and the São Paulo State Championships of 1985 and 1987.

In the 1986 Brazilian Championship, São Paulo entered as a favorite, unlike in 1977, but that did not mean an easy path. The early stages went smoothly, with only one defeat. In the knockout rounds, Careca demonstrated a high level of performance: he scored in every match except the first leg against Fluminense. The club overcame strong opponents and reached the final against Guarani, Careca’s former team. The first leg ended in a 1–1 draw, with goals from Evair for Guarani and Careca for São Paulo—both competition top scorers with 24 goals each. The second leg, played at a packed Estádio Brinco de Ouro da Princesa, also ended in a 1–1 draw in regulation time, forcing extra time. São Paulo took the lead in the first minute, but Guarani equalized six minutes later. At the five-minute mark of the second half of extra time, Guarani went ahead 3–2, and, confident that there was no time for another equalizer, the stadium’s loudspeaker began playing the club’s anthem. However, with just one minute remaining, the ball fell to Careca, who equalized and took the lead in the scoring charts. Once again, the title was decided on penalties, and again, it went to the Tricolor do Morumbi.

The year 1988 was not fruitful in titles and marked the end of the Menudos era, but it enriched the club’s assets with the inauguration on April 9 of the Frederico Antonio Germano Menzen Training Center—also known as the CT Barra Funda—in the Barra Funda neighborhood, covering an area of 44,472 square meters. It was built to better accommodate the club’s main squad, as the Morumbi Stadium, despite being comfortable, no longer met all the team’s needs with the modernization of the sport.

The team performed poorly in 1988, even with the signing of Bobô, and achieved little. The year 1989 seemed to follow the same pattern, but with a change in management, renewed motivation for the existing squad—including Raí—and the signing of Ricardo Rocha, the team won the Paulista Championship of 1989.

A notable characteristic of this era was that in its five state championship wins, the team always started poorly and recovered as the competition progressed, earning the nickname "time de chegada" (team of arrivals). As a result, fans were not concerned with a poor start in championships, confident that the team could still win the title.

== The Telê era — 1990 to 1994 ==
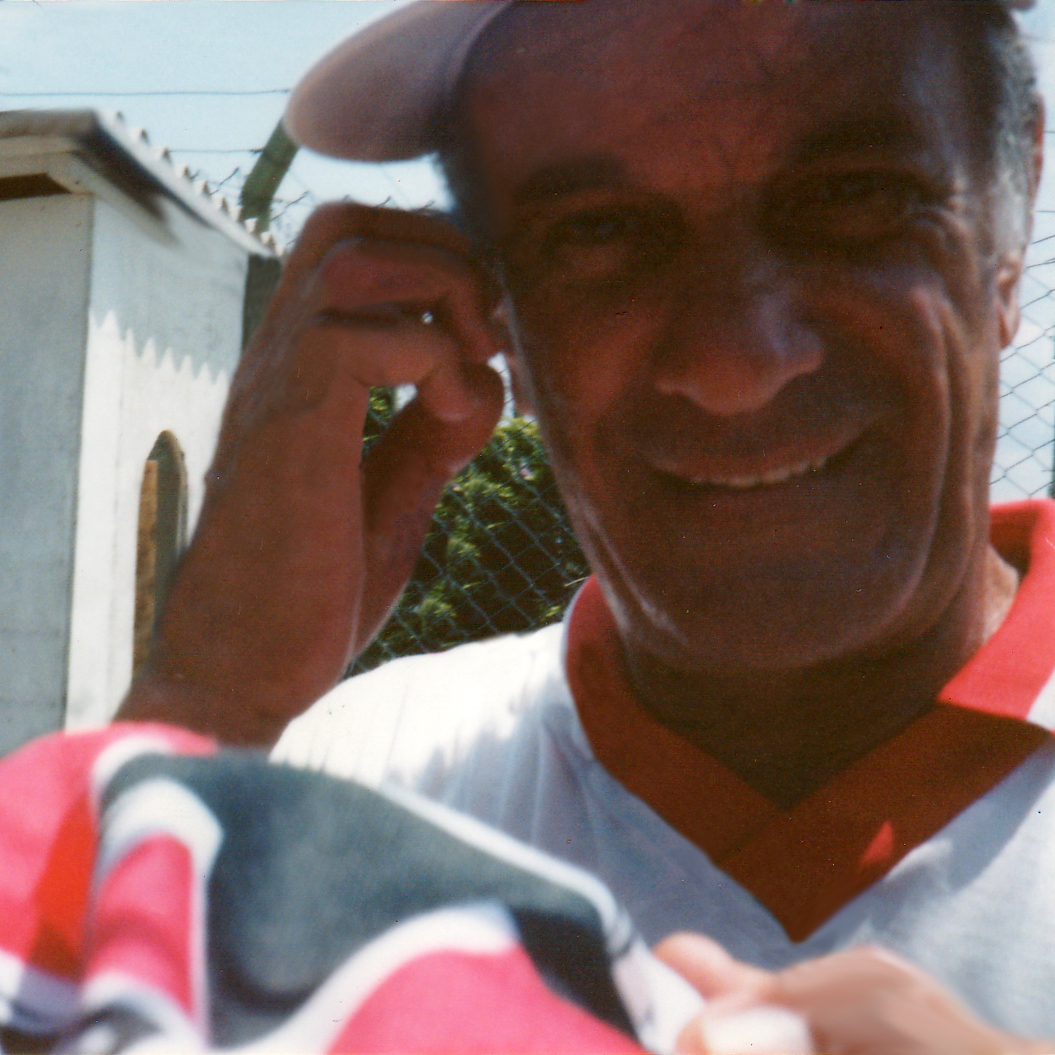
Telê Santana, the coach who won two World Championships and two Libertadores with São Paulo.

After nearly two decades of success, some predicted a decline for the club, which seemed likely in 1990. In the Paulista Championship of that year, São Paulo performed poorly, failing to qualify among the sixteen teams advancing to the second phase, which would compete in the stronger group the following year. The team needed a win in the relegation playoff against Botafogo de Ribeirão Preto to maintain title aspirations but managed only a draw, and even a 6–1 thrashing of Noroeste in the final round was not enough to secure qualification.

This episode is among the most contentious in the annals of São Paulo's football history, prompting the inquiry of whether the club would be relegated in 1990. Nonetheless, during the 1988 and 1989 seasons, a system for relegation was not in place. The 1990 regulations, following the previous years, did not provide for relegation to the immediately lower division.

For the 1991 Professional Football First Division Championship, Group I will consist of the 14 associations qualified to compete in the fourth phase of the 1990 Championship, and Group II will consist of the ten remaining associations that did not qualify for the fourth phase, plus four promoted from the 1990 Special Division.

— Paragraph 1 of Article 5 of the 1990 São Paulo State Championship regulations,

In the 1990 professional football first division championship, there will be no relegation to the professional football special division. However, starting in 1991, or each year thereafter, one association from the First Division will be relegated, and one association from the Special Division will be promoted.

— Paragraph 2 of Article 5 of the 1990 São Paulo State Championship regulations,

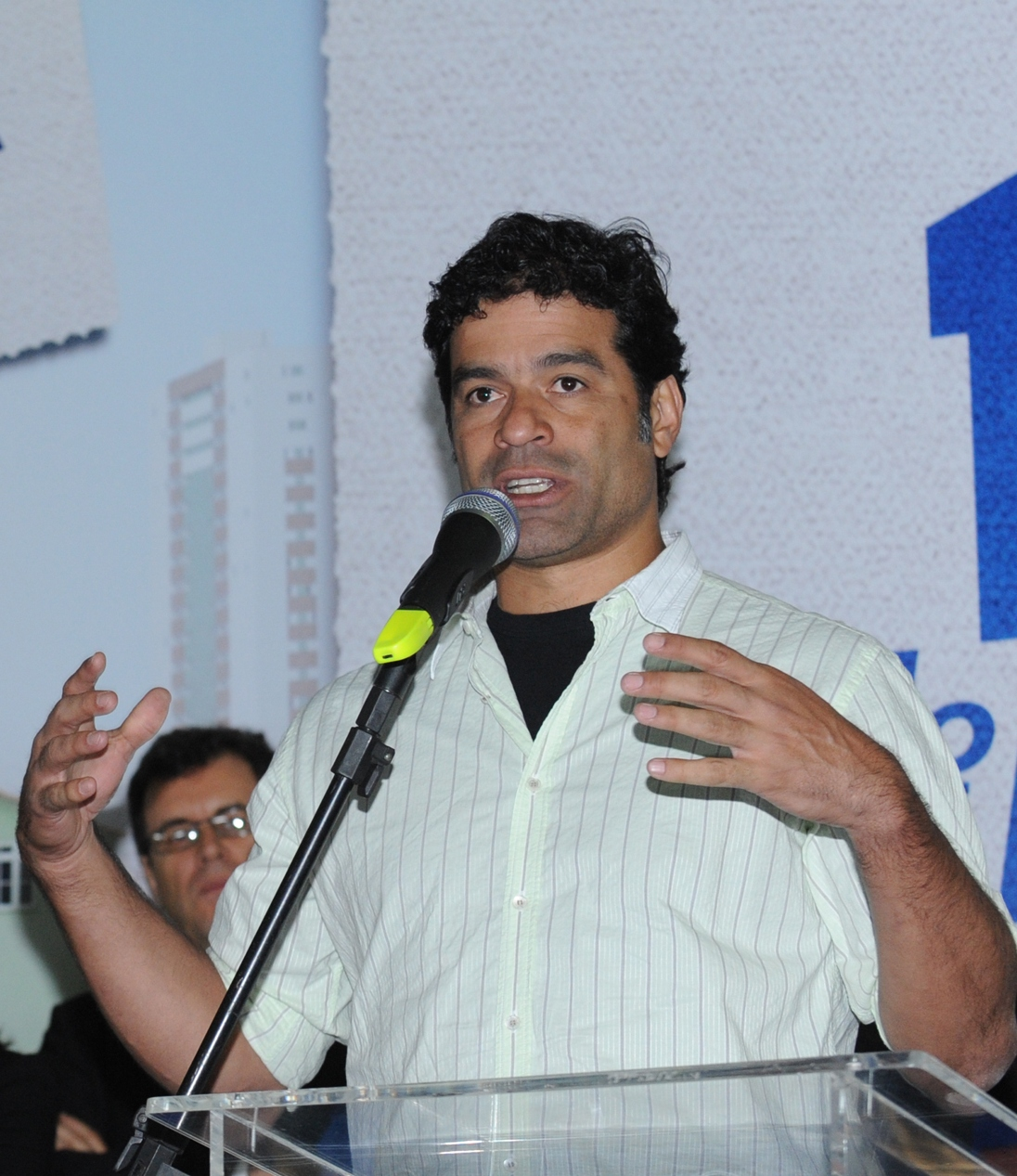
Raí, a key leader in the 1992 Libertadores and World Championship victories.

Returning to the championship, São Paulo, now under Telê Santana, could not improve its standing in the 1990 Paulista Championship. However, in the Paulista Championship of 1991, the team improved, taking advantage of matches against weaker opponents to reach the finals and ultimately win the title against Corinthians. The standout player of this championship, and for some time thereafter, was Raí, who joined the club and, despite being instrumental in the 1989 title, was not universally accepted. He was booed and nearly loaned out, but Telê’s insistence paid off, as Raí led the club to another state title. Telê turned the team around, as after two consecutive final losses, they won the Brazilian Championship in 1991, becoming three-time champions.

Subsequently, the potential to accomplish any objective was apparent, so much so that in 1992, the club prioritized winning the 1992 Copa Libertadores. In the Libertadores of 1972, São Paulo had been one draw away from the final; in 1974, they lost the final in a playoff match; and in 1978, 1982, and 1987, they did not advance past the first phase. The trophy was a priority for the club, but not for Telê, who considered the competition unfair. Thus, he fielded only three starters in the opening match and lost 3–0 to Criciúma. However, the board insisted and pushed the coach to prioritize the South American competition, noting that it would now include anti-doping tests, a request that was promptly met. The team improved throughout the competition. In the first leg of the final in Buenos Aires, Newell’s Old Boys won 1–0. In the return leg, an unprecedented scene unfolded: hours before the match, the Morumbi Stadium was already full, with 105,185 people inside and another 15,000 outside—and fans kept arriving. The access roads to the stadium were clogged. Driven by a packed stadium, the Libertadores title was finally won on penalties after a 1–0 victory in regulation time. The fans invaded the pitch to celebrate in a party São Paulo had never seen before.

With this title, the club faced an even greater challenge: taking on Barcelona led by Johan Cruyff—considered the best Barcelona of all time—featuring stars such as Koeman, Stoichkov, and Laudrup in the Intercontinental Cup. Earlier, in August, São Paulo had already defeated the same Barcelona 4–1 in the Teresa Herrera Trophy. In the World Championship match, Barcelona took the lead, but two goals from Raí turned the game around, giving the title to Telê Santana’s team. São Paulo was finally the best team in the world. Upon their return, São Paulo prevailed over another team in the second leg of the Paulista Championship of 1992 final: Palmeiras, which was enduring a 16-year title drought.

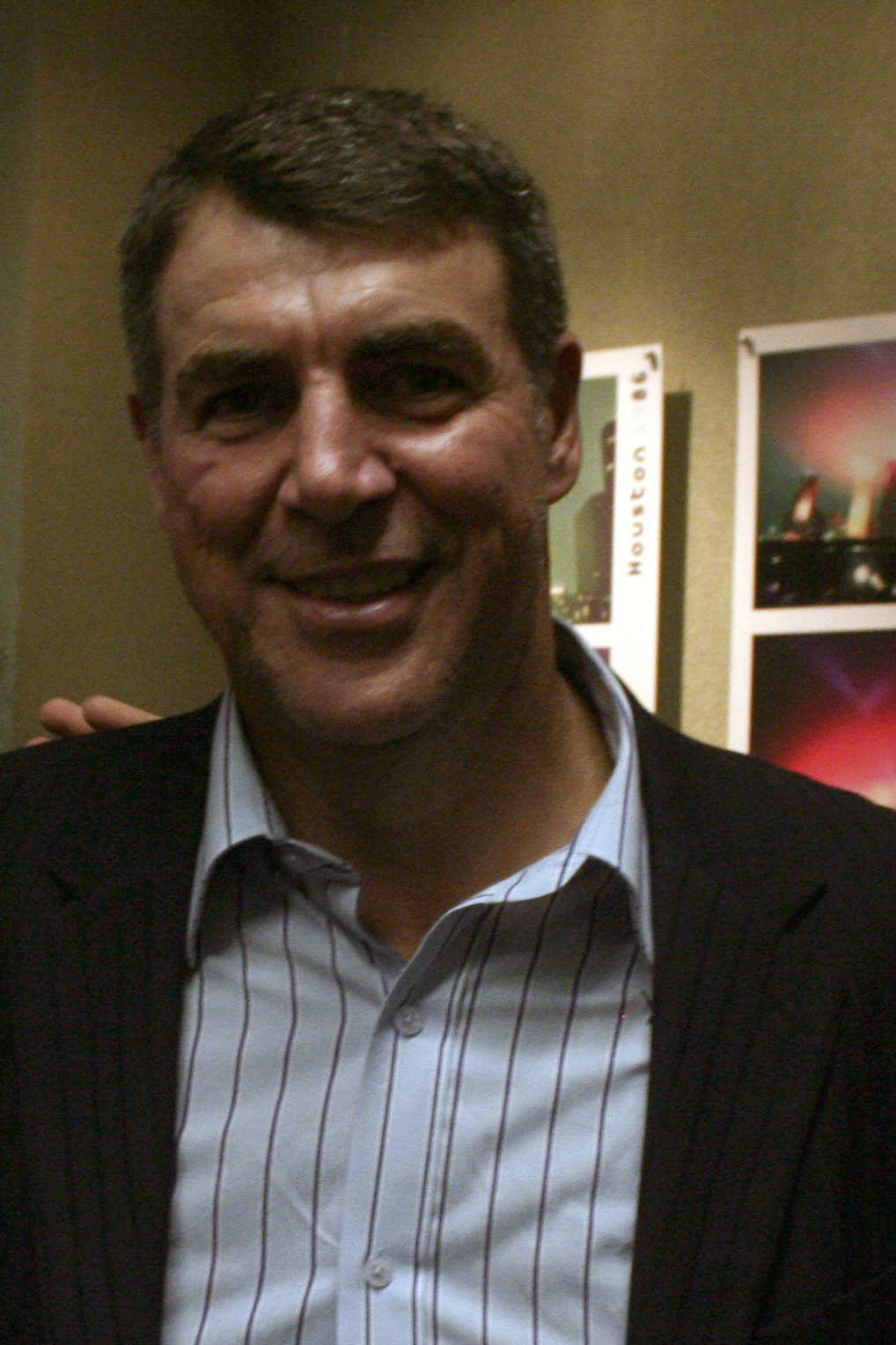
Zetti, the starting goalkeeper for the 1992 and 1993 titles.

São Paulo was impeccable throughout the entire match. They won with complete fairness.

— Johan Cruyff, Barcelona’s coach after the defeat to São Paulo in the 1992 Intercontinental Cup,

If you’re going to be run over, it’s better to be hit by a Ferrari.

— Johan Cruyff,

After reaching the top of the world, São Paulo needed to stay there. To that end, the Libertadores of 1993 was again given top priority, with the advantage that, as the 1992 champions, the team entered directly into the knockout phase. The squad was well-prepared, with peak technical and tactical performance, ready for a year in which they would play 97 matches.

São Paulo advanced more easily through their opponents compared to the previous year and reached the finals against Universidad Católica from Chile. In the first leg at Morumbi, they delivered a resounding 5–1 thrashing, virtually securing the trophy. The Chilean club's 2–0 victory in the second leg did not diminish the significance of the triumph, which set a new record for the largest margin of victory in a Libertadores final. This was Raí’s last championship with the club before he moved to France.

São Paulo narrowly missed a Libertadores/Paulista double. The club was knocked out of the finals against Palmeiras due to a loss to Corinthians, in which Neto scored a clearly offside goal, and a legitimate goal by Palhinha was disallowed. In the Recopa Sudamericana, the club won its first title, defeating Cruzeiro on penalties, and two months later, they won the Supercopa against Flamengo.

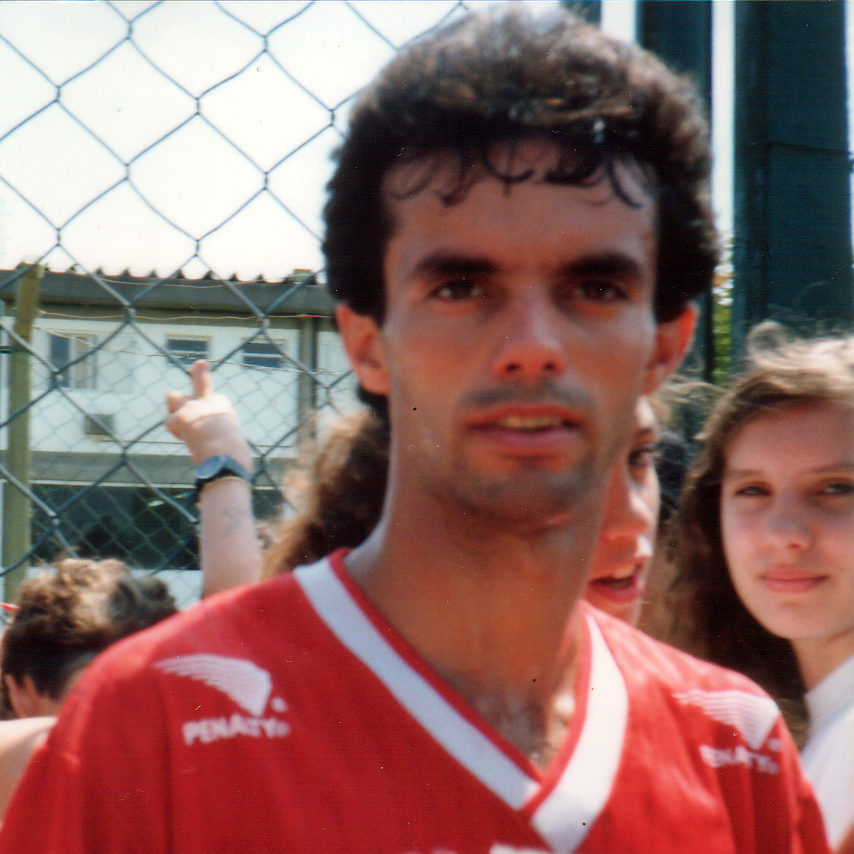
Palhinha, the club’s top scorer in the 1993 Libertadores.

São Paulo reached the Intercontinental Cup final again, this time against Milan led by Fabio Capello, the only Italian champion to go unbeaten in history. The match was highly anticipated, as experts considered both teams the best in the world at the time. Milan dominated early, pressuring São Paulo and creating the best chances to score, but it was São Paulo who took the lead. The Italians equalized in the second half from a corner kick, but eleven minutes later, São Paulo regained the lead. At the 36th minute, Milan tied the game again. It seemed extra time was inevitable, and the Brazilian team might lack the stamina after nearly a hundred matches that year. However, Müller was fortunate in this instance: following a move initiated by Toninho Cerezo, the ball deflected off the Italian goalkeeper, struck Müller's heel, and then rolled into the net: 3–2. São Paulo's victory was achieved through counter-attacks, thereby securing their second world title.

Last year, the superteam was Barcelona, but we came to Tokyo and beat them. This year, the superteam was Milan. And we beat them too. So I ask: if they are superteams, what is São Paulo, then? I’d like someone to answer that…

— Ronaldão,

São Paulo reached the finals of the Libertadores in 1994 but could not secure the third title. Much of 1994 was unsuccessful, with the exceptions of the Recopa Sudamericana, won against Botafogo, and the Copa CONMEBOL. Notably, the club’s surprise that year was the so-called "Expressinho," the youth and reserve team that played friendly matches and tournaments when the main squad was unavailable. This team, featuring young talents such asRogério Ceni, Juninho Paulista, and Denílson, was tasked with competing in, among other tournaments, the Copa CONMEBOL (a precursor to the current Copa Sudamericana), and won the title, defeating Peñarol with a 6–1 thrashing in the first leg of the final.

Telê Santana stayed with São Paulo for five years. During this period, he won every possible competition for a Paulista club (except the Copa do Brasil): the São Paulo State Championship, Brazilian Championship, Libertadores, Copa CONMEBOL, Supercopa Libertadores, Recopa Libertadores, Intercontinental Cup, and the Ramón de Carranza and Teresa Herrera tournaments.

In 1993, the club decided to organize and showcase its achievements. After ten months of planning, the Luiz Cássio dos Santos Werneck Memorial was inaugurated in 1994. The name honors Luiz Cássio dos Santos Werneck, a loyal supporter of Cícero Pompeu de Toledo during the construction of the Morumbi Stadium. Until then, the club’s history had not been meticulously preserved, and São Paulo was a pioneer in this type of initiative.

The memorial was established to display not only on-field achievements but also off-field accomplishments. It also aims to highlight significant moments in the club’s history and the broader sports world. The memorial houses the trophies won throughout the club’s history, personal items of Éder Jofre, Leônidas da Silva, and Adhemar Ferreira da Silva, portraits of players and idols, the history of the Morumbi Stadium, and the achievements of all sports practiced by the club.

== 1995 to 2004 ==
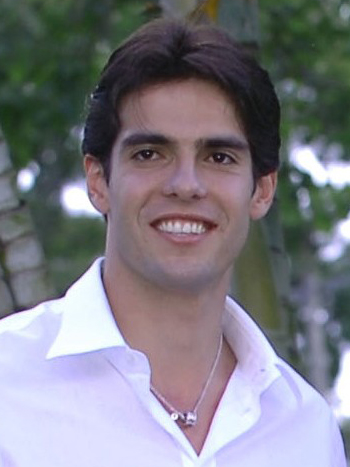
Kaká, a São Paulo youth product and the world’s best player in 2007.

In 1995, Telê Santana fell ill and stepped away until 1996, when he was permanently replaced: the "Telê Era" was over. Compounding this, a structural renovation of the stadium to install dampers sidelined football. The team was regarded as lacking in maturity, and three runner-up finishes in 1996/97—two state championships and a Supercopa—earned it the nickname "viceado". Between 1995 and 2004, fourteen coaches passed through the club, with no major titles won during this period.

The team had talented players, including Rogério Ceni, França, and Denílson, and signed Gallo, Capitão, and Márcio Santos. With this squad, the club reached the finals of the Paulista Championship of 1998. It was with Raí’s return, solely for the final, that the club won its 19th state title.

Raí had agreed to return since 1997, with the transfer set to be finalized in May 1998. However, as Raí was already in São Paulo and planned to attend the final, a club director consulted the São Paulo Football Federation to confirm his eligibility and received approval. All documentation was rushed to ensure he could play legally. The players unanimously accepted his return and made room for him in the lineup. The move paid off, as with Raí on the field, São Paulo defeated Corinthians 3–1, with Raí scoring a goal and providing an assist.

The following year started poorly, with three consecutive semifinal eliminations. The team needed to make squad changes and switch coaches to pursue the desired titles. In 2000, the team won the Paulista Championship in a final that marked Raí’s last title with São Paulo. With this victory, the Tricolor ended the century as the most successful team in São Paulo state championships on average, with one title every 3.33 seasons, compared to 3.91 for Corinthians and 4.09 for Palmeiras.

Until that year, the club had not won two titles: the Rio-São Paulo Tournament and the Copa do Brasil. They lost the Copa do Brasil of 2000 final, where they needed only a draw with goals against Cruzeiro but suffered a 2–1 comeback loss at the 44th minute of the second half. Shortly after the elimination, Raí retired definitively from football.

The Rio-São Paulo Tournament was always cherished by fans, and by 2001, São Paulo had competed in 21 editions, with runner-up finishes as their best results in 1933, 1962, 1965, and 1998. Whenever the team was poised to win, something prevented their triumph. In 1949, São Paulo was set to face Corinthians in the final, needing only a draw, but the match was postponed due to the Copa América and never took place. In 1956, the club won the national phase of the competition, but it was not official, as all Rio de Janeiro teams withdrew.

However, in 2001, without Raí but with Luís Fabiano, Júlio Baptista, and Kaká, São Paulo reached the Rio-São Paulo final and defeated Botafogo.

Some time later, in July 2001, the team was without one of its greatest idols, Rogério Ceni, for nearly a month, accused by the board of fabricating an offer from Arsenal in England. With the help of several staff, teammates, and even directors, he managed to overcome the situation. During this period, the current club idol was nearly transferred to Cruzeiro, which backed out at the last minute. By this time, the team already had the experience of Leonardo, who had returned from Italy.

In 2002, São Paulo had a disastrous year: they lost another Rio-São Paulo final to Corinthians, were eliminated from the Copa do Brasil by the same team, and in the Brazilian Championship, they were knocked out after two losses to the Santos team led by Robinho. The sole redeeming factor was the Supercampeonato Paulista, a tournament featuring the Paulista Championship champion, Ituano, and the top three São Paulo teams from that year’s Rio-São Paulo, the last edition of the tournament.

In boxing, the club managed to have the era’s greatest boxer wear São Paulo’s colors. On August 3, 2002, boxer Acelino Freitas, known as Popó, defeated Daniel Attah by points in Phoenix, representing São Paulo. There was an attempt to hold one of his fights at the Morumbi Stadium, but it was unsuccessful.

In 2003 and 2004, the most the club achieved was qualification for the Libertadores, a competition they had not participated in for ten years. Otherwise, the team went through this period with a financial crisis, a focus on the stadium over football, tactically unbalanced squads, and roster changes. In 2003, with his image already tarnished among fans, Kaká left the club after a short stint. In 2004, São Paulo lost in the semifinals to Once Caldas from Colombia and was eliminated from the Libertadores of 2004. Upon returning to Brazil, they went straight to Belém, where they lost to Paysandu. Back in the capital, they were greeted with stones from fans, and during the classic against Palmeiras, the crowd chanted "pipoqueiros" (chokers) while wearing yellow shirts. The team’s spirit needed to change. In the latter part of the year, Luís Fabiano departed from the club, leaving it devoid of idols. At the time, Rogério Ceni was regarded as a highly skilled goalkeeper but not as an idol.

In 2004, the club also inaugurated the Sports, Physiotherapy, and Physiological Rehabilitation Center, REFFIS, to treat club employees and athletes, as well as those from other organizations. It is regarded as the most contemporary facility of its kind owned by a club in South America and is regarded as a model in Brazil.

== 2005 to 2008 ==
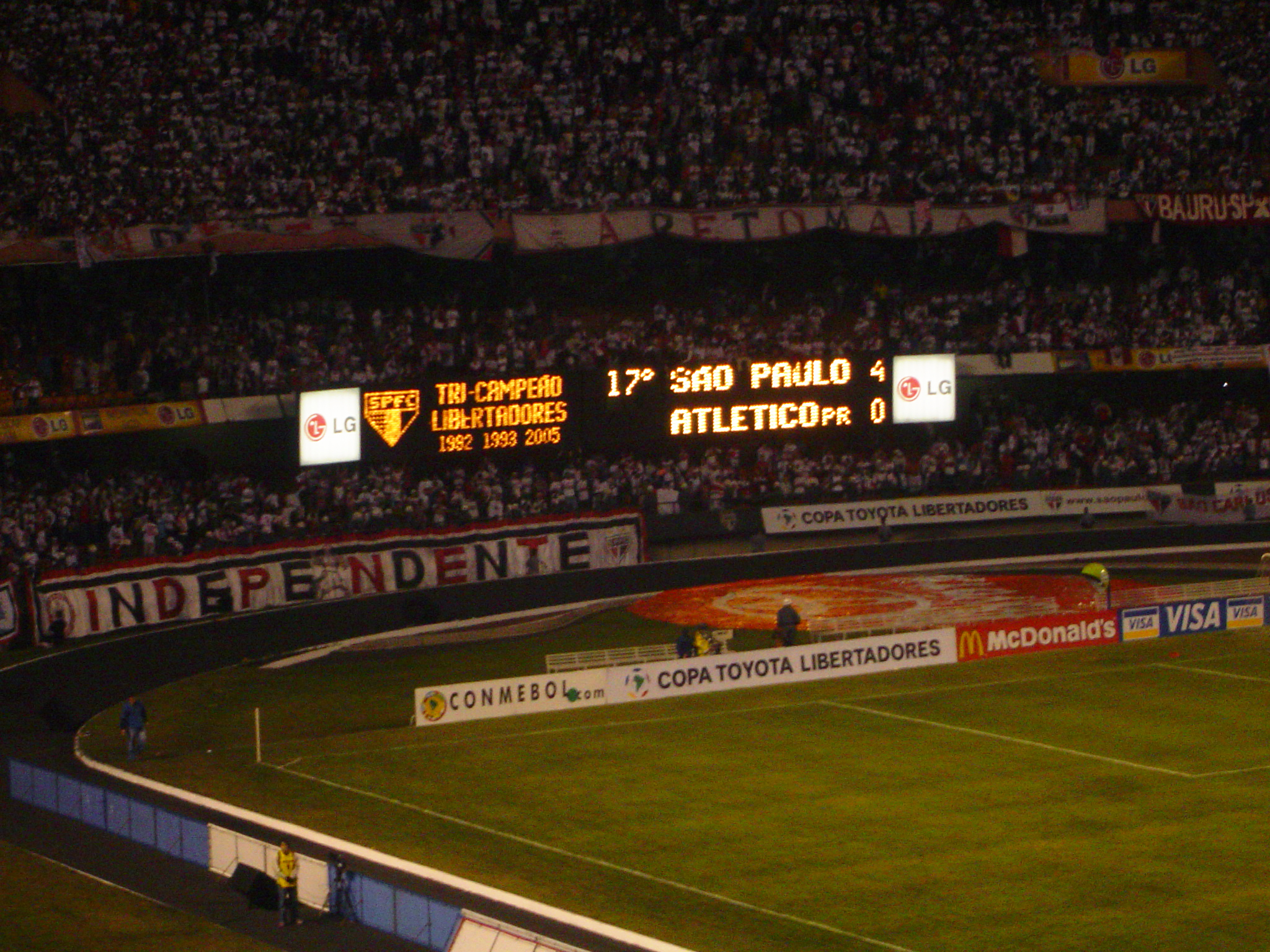
Electronic scoreboard showing the result of the 2005 Libertadores final.

The team already had a solid foundation, and with the signings of Mineiro, Josué, and Luizão, it was complete for its priority: the Copa Libertadores. Under Emerson Leão’s command, the team adopted a warrior’s spirit and won the Paulista Championship with ease. However, Leão unexpectedly resigned after the title, in the middle of the Libertadores. Paulo Autuori took over, continuing and even improving the previous work. Under his leadership, the team breezed through all South American opponents until reaching the final against Atlético Paranaense, the first final contested between clubs from the same country.

Mineiro, scorer of the goal in the 2005 World Championship.

In the first leg, played at Estádio Beira-Rio due to the Arena da Baixada’s insufficient capacity of 40,000, São Paulo secured a 1–1 draw, leaving the decision for the Morumbi. On July 14, 2005, São Paulo won the title for the third time. The second leg was much easier, with São Paulo dominating from the start and opening the scoring in the first half. In the second half, they achieved a decisive 4-0 victory, the second-largest margin in Libertadores final history, becoming the first Brazilian team to win the competition three times.

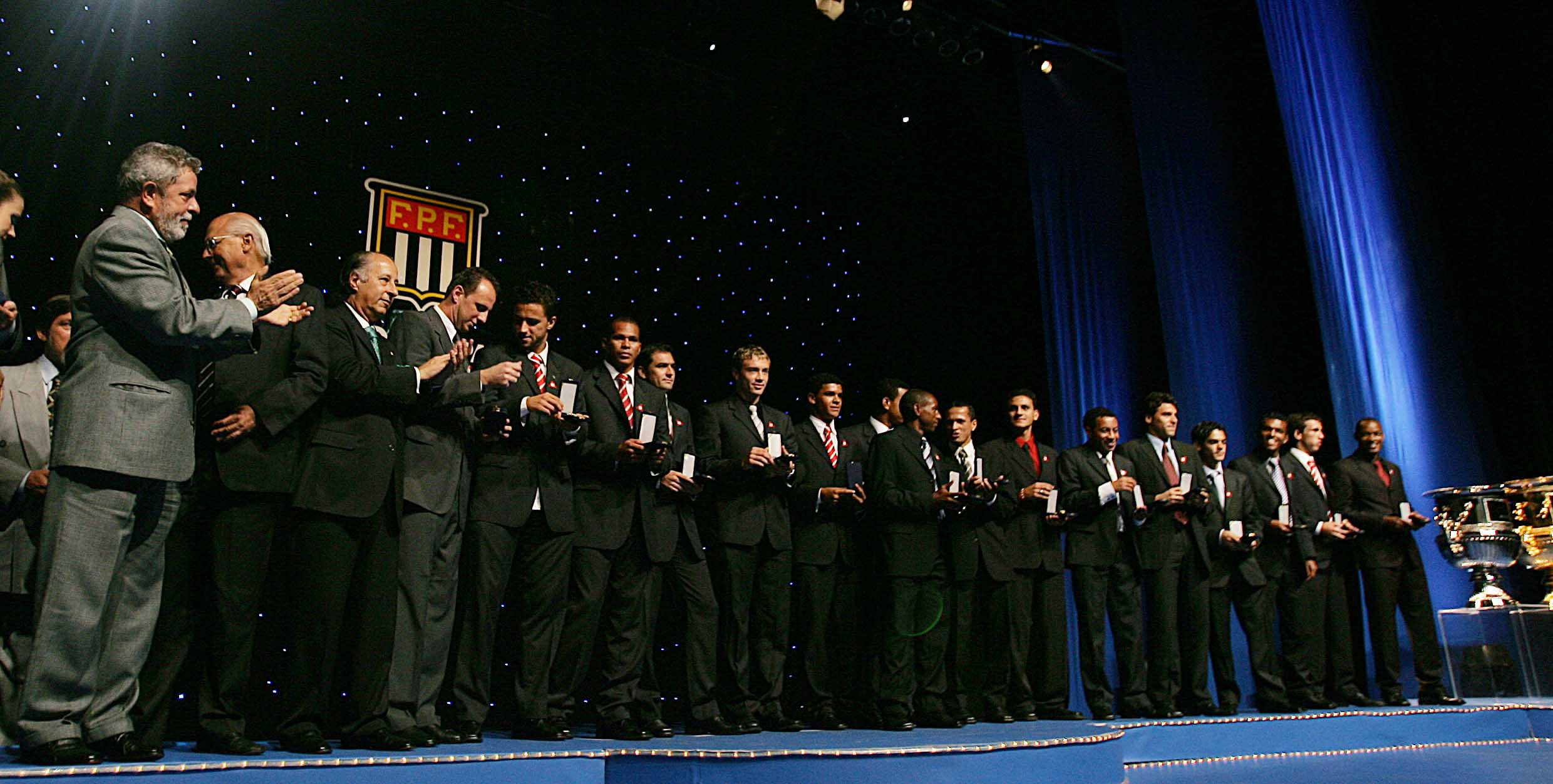
Tribute received from the São Paulo Football Federation and President Lula for the third world championship.

Once again, the team set out for the world title, this time in a tournament fully organized by FIFA. The first opponent was Al-Ittihad. There was fear among the squad of a major upset, and the media reported a rift in the team over the "bonus" issue, which never occurred.

After a few hours, the expected opponent was confirmed: Liverpool, with São Paulo as the underdog. The English team’s goalkeeper had not conceded a goal in eleven matches. Rogério Ceni, already a club idol, played the final with an injured finger and a medial meniscus issue. In a fast-paced match, Liverpool pressured São Paulo with aerial balls and long passes, while the Tricolor played a defensively perfect game and scored a goal. Thus, the team secured a 1–0 victory with Mineiro’s goal, Rogério’s saves, and the team’s grit and determination. The three-time champion team exhibited a warrior-like spirit and valiant determination, though it lacked the talent of the 1992 and 1993 teams. However, it demonstrated a comparable level of deservingness, as it achieved victory in the championship with greater ease compared to the 1992 squad.

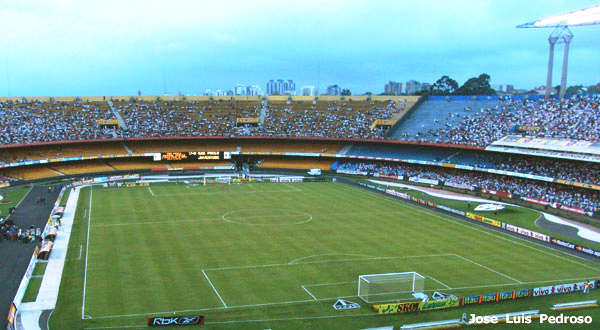
The Brazilian Championship match against Juventude drew one of the largest crowds of the tournament.

After the title, a dismantling of the champion team was inevitable. Few key players were lost, one of the most significant being full-back Cicinho, but he was adequately replaced by Ilsinho. The team remained under the leadership of Rogério Ceni, now coached by Muricy Ramalho. After runner-up finishes in the Paulista, Libertadores, and Recopa, the team made the Brazilian Championship of 2006 their priority and only salvation for the season. The team led the table for nearly the entire championship, had the best attack and defense, and finished nine points ahead of the runner-up. The title-clinching match, as in previous championships, was a draw, this time 1–1 against Atlético Paranaense in the third-to-last round. The campaign’s highlights were Rogério Ceni, who led the team, won the championship missing from his collection, and became the world’s highest-scoring goalkeeper, and the fans, who filled the Morumbi Stadium. With the 2006 Brazilian Championship, São Paulo maintained its tradition of winning a Brazilian title every decade.

On October 18, 2006, the city of São Paulo enacted law number 14,229, dated October 11 of the same year, based on bill number 648 of 2005, establishing December 16 as "Tricolor Day" to commemorate the club’s refounding date.

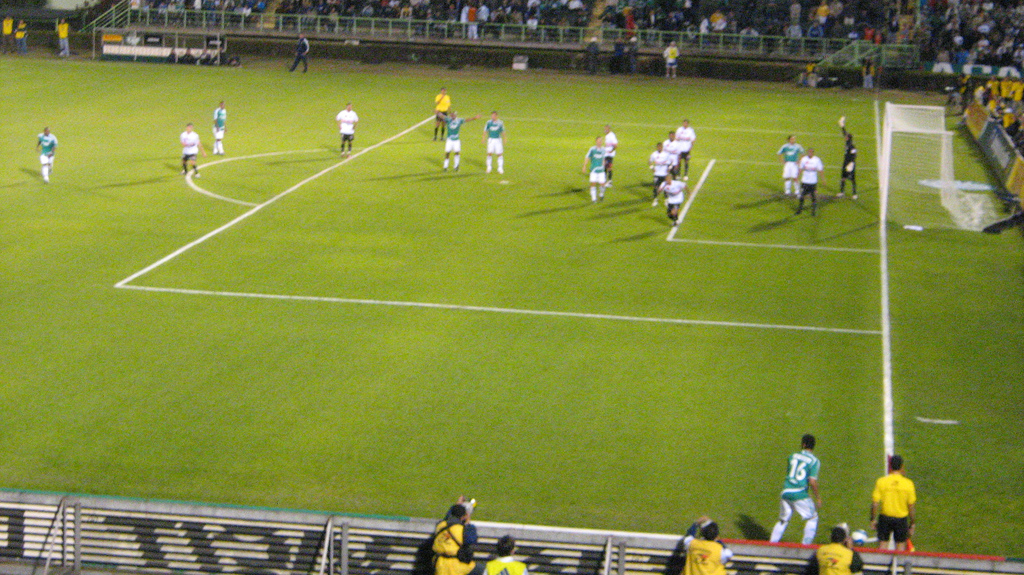
A Choque-Rei match that ended with a 1–0 Tricolor victory.

In 2007, the team lost key players again and was eliminated early in the Paulista and Libertadores. Once again, Muricy faced pressure to leave, but thanks to president Juvenal Juvêncio, he stayed. The start of the Brazilian Championship of 2007 was shaky, partly due to the Libertadores elimination, but the Tricolor gained momentum and led the table by the end of the first half. Their winning streak was so strong that they went 16 games without a loss, including 14 victories. They also went 688 minutes without conceding a goal in the tournament over nine matches. São Paulo revealed new talents, such as Hernanes and Breno. The title-clinching match had a different flavor, secured with a victory. The club needed only a draw against América from Rio Grande do Norte, but they won 3–0. With this title, despite the year’s turbulence, coach Muricy Ramalho entered history as one of the few two-time Brazilian Championship-winning coaches.

That same year, the club began implementing a project for an area in the Morumbi Stadium, called Morumbi Concept Hall, aimed at increasing foot traffic, strengthening the club’s brand, and boosting revenue on non-match days, thus expanding entertainment, business, and leisure options for São Paulo residents and tourists.

As a first step in this venture, the club launched the Rbk Concept Store, inaugurated on August 27, 2007. Spanning 700 square meters, the megastore is the largest of its kind in a stadium in Latin America and includes a VIP box for match days.

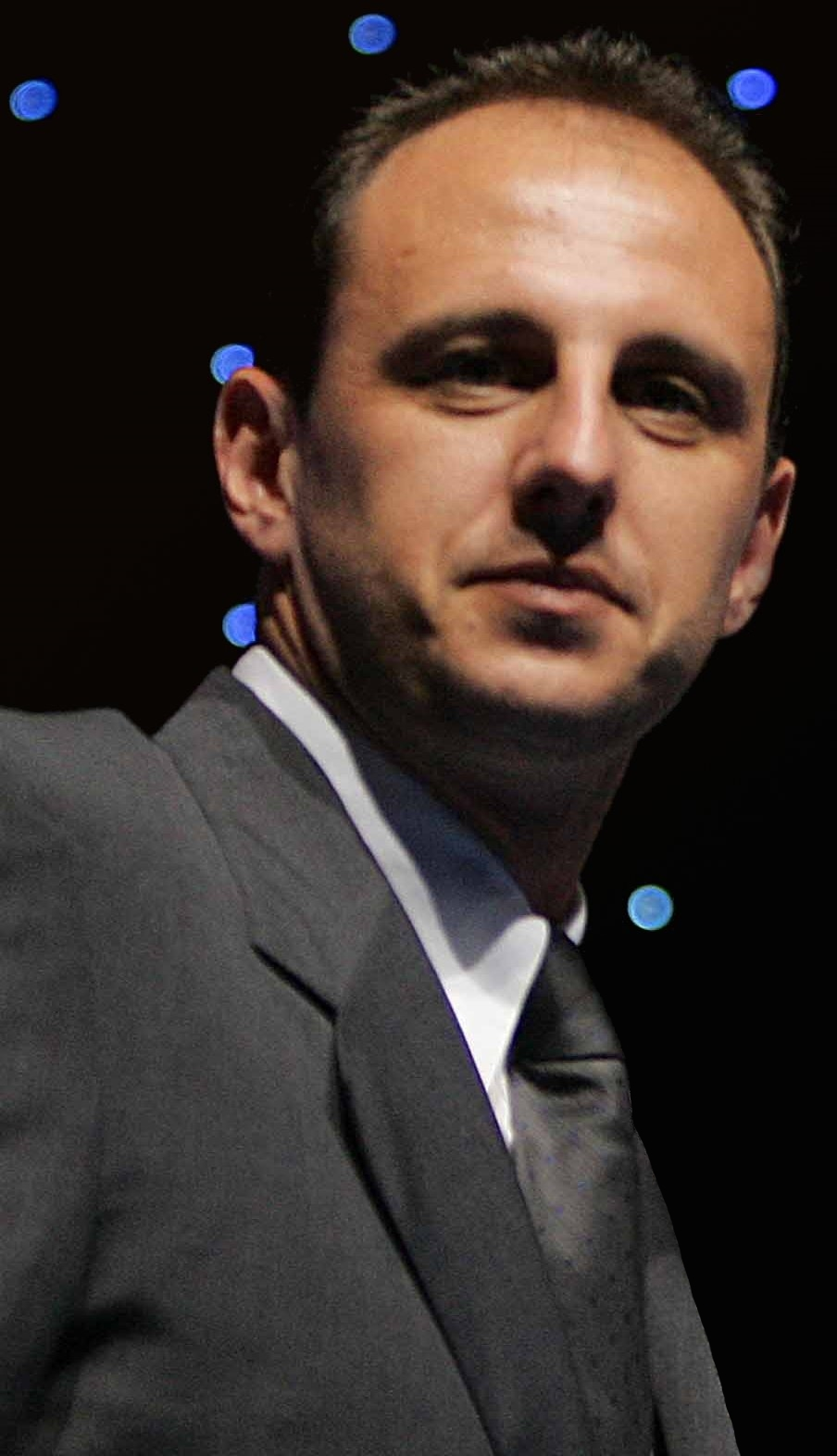
Rogério Ceni, leader of the three-time world champion and six-time Brazilian champion team.

The year passed, and 2008 unfolded similarly to the previous year: the team was eliminated in the Paulista and Libertadores, leaving the Brazilian Championship of 2008 as their chance for redemption. The problem was that the team took a long time to find its rhythm, and at the start of the second half, the leader Grêmio had an 11-point lead over the Tricolor. However, as the season progressed, the team made a strategic decision to pursue another title, marking the first three-peat in the club's history. They achieved a decisive victory over all direct competitors, maintaining an unblemished record for 16 consecutive games. The 2008 team reflected Muricy's coaching style, yet Rogério Ceni was, once again, the team's leader.

The final match, this time, took place in the last round against Goiás during a turbulent moment. Just before the decisive match, where a draw would suffice for São Paulo, Marco Pólo Del Nero, president of the FPF, advised by a GAECO prosecutor, contacted the CBF president Ricardo Teixeira, alleging that an envelope addressed to the match referee, Wagner Tardelli, had been sent by São Paulo as an attempt to bribe him.

Upon learning of this, the Arbitration Committee, through a new draw to protect the referee’s and championship’s integrity, replaced the referee for the decisive match. An inquiry was launched by the STJD to identify those responsible. On February 13 of the following year, after reviewing the case, the CBF, the referee, and São Paulo were cleared of bribery charges due to lack of evidence, and a new inquiry was opened to investigate the conduct of the federation and its president. On March 4, the FPF was fined ten thousand reais, and the president was suspended for ninety days for filing an unfounded complaint.

Thus, although everything was clarified later, the match was played amid significant off-field controversy, but the players remained focused on the decisive game. The title-clinching goal came from the offside Borges, a 1–0 victory in a match that would have secured the title for the Tricolor do Morumbi even without the goal. With this win, the club achieved an unprecedented three-peat in the Brazilian Championship and secured their sixth title.

== Difficult years — 2009 to 2020 ==
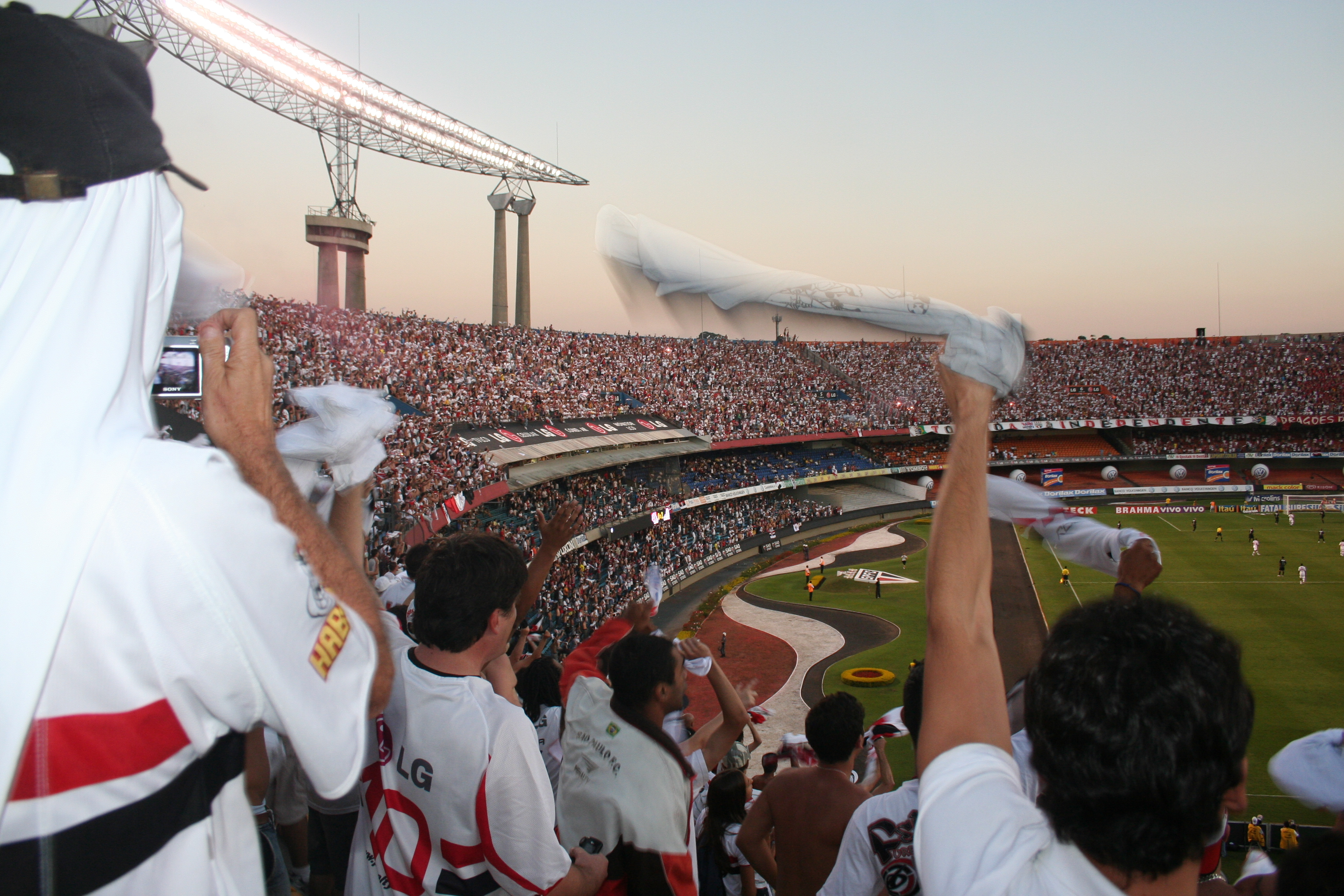
São Paulo fans celebrating despite the loss to Corinthians in the Paulista semifinal.

The new year began with high hopes that the team would have an exceptional season and finally win the 2009 Copa Libertadores, as the team had failed three times in a row, and each time it was a Brazilian team that defeated them. The squad was kept intact and new players were brought in, creating a sense of optimism for the year.

The 2009 Campeonato Paulista was initially given secondary importance, as the Libertadores was the primary target. The club even considered fielding a reserve team in some matches, but this idea was quickly discarded. Nevertheless, the club managed only a fourth-place finish in the state competition. Focused on the Libertadores, the club also underperformed and was eliminated in the quarter-finals by another Brazilian team, this time Cruzeiro. Muricy Ramalho's departure occurred due to the conclusion of a significant cycle at the club, where he had previously secured three consecutive Brazilian championships. However, the team had encountered challenges in the most crucial competition, the Libertadores.

Following Muricy's dismissal on 19 June, Ricardo Gomes was hired the following day after talks began the previous night. In the match the following day against Corinthians, Milton Cruz took charge of the team on an interim basis and the new coach was officially presented on Wednesday. After the change in management, the team gained momentum in the Campeonato Brasileiro and climbed from 14th position to the top four — the group of teams qualifying for the Libertadores — with a chance even to win a fourth consecutive championship, which would have been the seventh national title in its history. However, after stumbles in the final stretch of the competition, the club finished in third place. As a consolation, they secured their seventh consecutive participation in the Libertadores, the 15th in their history, making them the Brazilian club with the most appearances in the competition.

The 2010 season began with high expectations for the São Paulo fans, with the board bringing in Fernandinho, a revelation from the 2009 Campeonato Brasileiro with Grêmio Barueri, and players such as Cicinho, Alex Silva, and Marcelinho Paraíba. However, the year was not successful for São Paulo. After a decent campaign in the 2010 Campeonato Paulista, where they were eliminated by Santos led by Neymar, Paulo Henrique Ganso, and Robinho, the team focused solely on the Copa Libertadores. After finishing as the second-best team in the group stage, behind rivals Corinthians, São Paulo eliminated Universitario from Peru on penalties after two 0-0 draws. Next, they faced their previous Libertadores nemesis, Cruzeiro, now reinforced with Fernandão, a long-time target of the board, who debuted with a 2-0 victory at Mineirão, a result repeated in the return leg at Morumbi, advancing to the semifinals after three years to face another Brazilian team, Internacional. The semifinals, however, were played after the 2010 FIFA World Cup. During this period, Cicinho returned to Roma, and Washington, the club's top scorer in the Libertadores, went back to Fluminense, but another former player, Ricardo Oliveira, returned. São Paulo lost the first leg at Beira-Rio 1-0 with a poor performance and won the return leg 2-1, but were eliminated due to the away goals rule. This marked their fifth consecutive Libertadores elimination by a Brazilian club, sealing Ricardo Gomes' dismissal.

In the Brasileirão, São Paulo had a steady start due to their focus on the Libertadores. After Gomes' departure, the board promoted Sérgio Baresi to head coach. He had won the Copa São Paulo de Futebol Júnior earlier that year and knew the youth players but lacked experience. Poor results forced his exit after fourteen games. His positive contribution was the promotion of young talents such as Lucas and Casemiro to the main squad. Paulo César Carpegiani, who was performing well with Atlético-PR, was hired in his place. Despite aiming to qualify for the 2011 Libertadores, he was unsuccessful: São Paulo finished only ninth and missed the Libertadores for the first time in eight years.

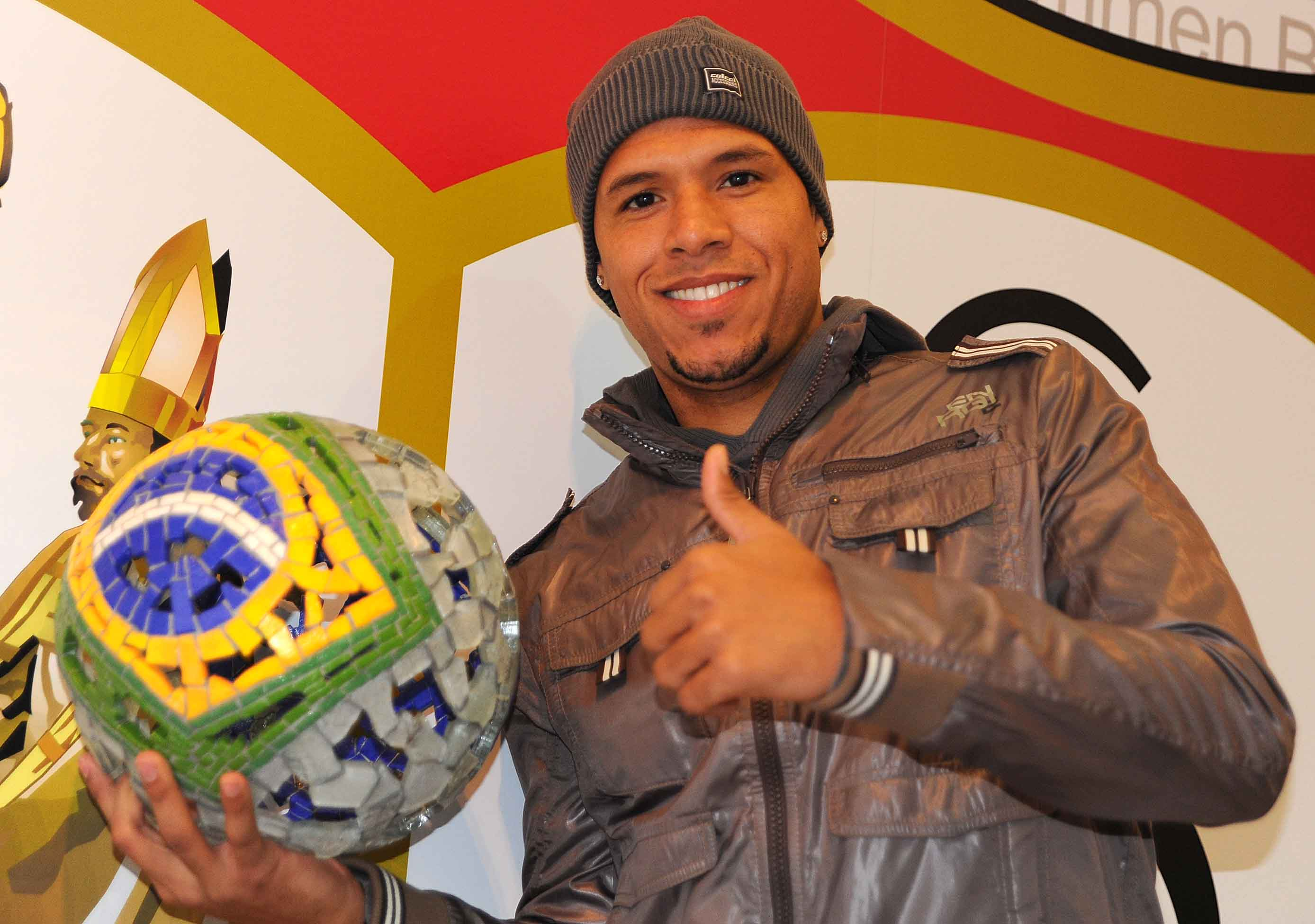
Luís Fabiano, one of the recent idols of the São Paulo fans.

The 2011 season was the worst in many years for São Paulo: the team was eliminated from the 2011 Campeonato Paulista by Santos again, from the Copa do Brasil by Avaí (which was relegated to Série B that same year), and from the 2011 Copa Sudamericana by Libertad from Paraguay. In the Campeonato Brasileiro, São Paulo finished in sixth place, one position short of qualifying for the Libertadores. However, not everything was negative for São Paulo in 2011. That year, goalkeeper Rogério Ceni scored his 100th career goal in a victory over Corinthians in the Paulistão, breaking an eleven-game winless streak against their rivals. Additionally, the goalkeeper also played his 1,000th match for São Paulo against Atlético Mineiro in the Campeonato Brasileiro. The board also announced the signing of Luís Fabiano for 7.6 million euros, the most expensive acquisition in São Paulo’s history at the time, in March, although the striker only returned to the pitch in October due to a knee injury sustained while still playing for Sevilla.

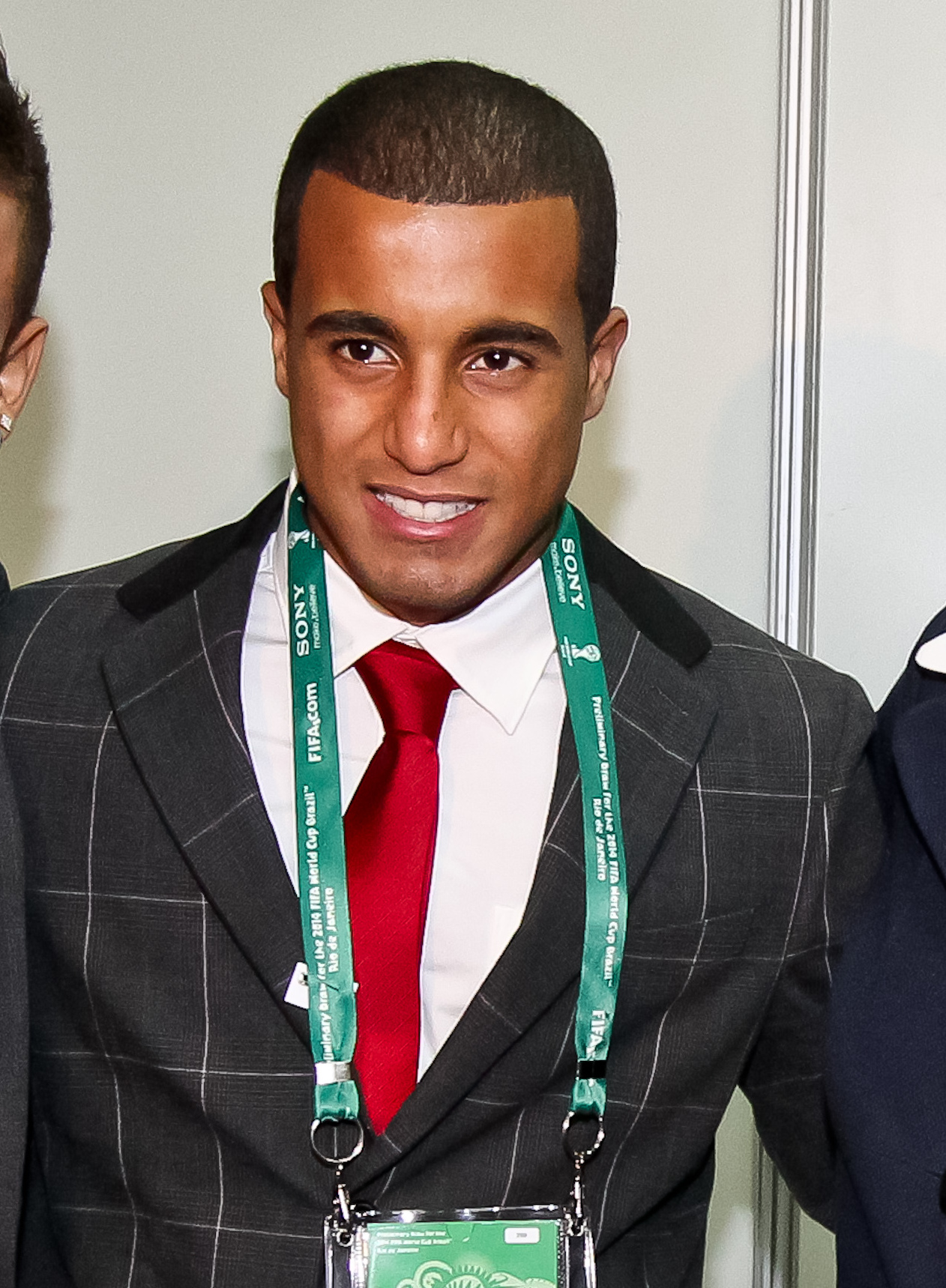
Lucas Moura, a player sold for 108 million reais.

Attempting to erase the negative impression left by the previous year’s team, accused of lacking grit, São Paulo went on a spending spree and signed several players for the 2012 season, including Paulo Miranda, Jádson, Fabrício, Bruno Cortez, and Osvaldo, while continuing to back the work of coach Émerson Leão, hired in the final stretch of the 2011 Brasileirão. The results were unsatisfactory: the team started well in pursuit of the 2012 Campeonato Paulista, but could not withstand Santos and was eliminated by them for the third consecutive time in the semifinal, in a match where defender Paulo Miranda (already heavily criticized for repeated errors) fell out of favor with the fans. This episode marked his sidelining from the club, which was aiming for the unprecedented conquest of the 2012 Copa do Brasil. The team advanced past Ponte Preta and Goiás but fell in the semifinal against Coritiba. After the elimination, protests similar to those in 2004 (after the elimination against Once Caldas in the Libertadores) began among the fans. Leão was sacked shortly afterward, and Milton Cruz took over again as interim coach, with Ney Franco hired for the remainder of the Campeonato Brasileiro. During this period, São Paulo fans witnessed the successes of their biggest rivals (Santos won the Paulista title for the third time, Palmeiras won the 2012 Copa do Brasil, ending a drought of over ten years without major titles, and Corinthians won their first Copa Libertadores). Mid-season, the São Paulo board announced the sale of midfielder Lucas to Paris Saint-Germain for 108 million reais, the largest transfer fee for a Brazilian club at the time—though the player would only join the French club in January 2013.

Under Ney Franco, São Paulo recovered in the season and finished the Brasileirão in fourth place, securing the long-awaited return to the 2013 Copa Libertadores after two years of absence. During the season, the club also announced the signing of Paulo Henrique Ganso, in the largest transaction between two Brazilian clubs in history. Additionally, São Paulo set attendance records at the Morumbi, achieving the highest crowds in the Brasileirão and CONMEBOL competitions that season, which was capped off with the controversial, unbeaten, and unprecedented conquest of the 2012 Copa Sudamericana. During the competition, São Paulo eliminated Bahia, faced Liga de Loja, and defeated the 2011 Copa Sudamericana champion, Universidad de Chile, with a resounding 5-0 victory in the return leg. In the semifinal, they defeated Universidad Católica and set up a final against Tigre from Argentina. In the first leg of the final, São Paulo held on for a 0-0 draw despite facing significant challenges, including the expulsion of Luís Fabiano. In the second leg, São Paulo scored 2-0 in the first half with goals from Lucas and Osvaldo, in a match marked by rough play from the Argentines. At halftime, Lucas showed a blood-soaked piece of cotton, the result of an elbow from Orbán of Tigre. This sparked a widespread brawl that led to the expulsion of Paulo Miranda from São Paulo and Días from Tigre. The Argentine club refused to return to the field for the second half after a locker room altercation. As a result, the Chilean referee Enrique Osses ended the match, and São Paulo claimed the unprecedented title, their 12th international title and 41st official title, ending a four-year title drought.

For the 2013 season, with six competitions ahead (Campeonato Paulista, Copa Libertadores, Campeonato Brasileiro, Copa Sudamericana, and also the Suruga Bank Championship and Recopa Sudamericana), São Paulo secured the signing of experienced defender Lúcio and brought in one of the revelations of the previous Brasileirão, striker Aloísio, along with Negueba, Wallyson, and the return of full-back Thiago Carleto.

In the Campeonato Paulista, São Paulo again finished the first phase in first place. In the quarter-finals, they eliminated Penapolense, in a match marked by the use of a commemorative all-red jersey. However, in the semifinal, they succumbed to rivals Corinthians on penalties at home: São Paulo had not beaten their rivals at Morumbi since 2007. In the 2013 Copa Libertadores, São Paulo advanced past Bolívar in the first phase with an 8-5 aggregate score. In the group stage, they struggled, failing to win any away games, but a 2-0 victory at Morumbi against Atlético Mineiro, combined with The Strongest’s loss to Arsenal de Sarandí, secured their place in the round of 16, preventing what would have been the worst participation in the club’s history in the international competition. They then faced Atlético again in the knockout stage and were defeated, once again by a Brazilian team, with a 4-1 thrashing in the return leg.

This elimination led to the sidelining of seven reserve players from the squad. The board clashed with striker Luís Fabiano after statements from president Juvenal Juvêncio, but kept coach Ney Franco in place despite protests from some fans. The team signed some reinforcements from smaller Paulista clubs for the rest of the season and confirmed participation in two additional competitions that year, the Audi Cup and the Eusébio Cup, both played in Europe, where São Paulo would tour during the second half of the year.

The return after the break was disastrous. São Paulo lost the Recopa Sudamericana to rivals Corinthians with two defeats and suffered the worst streak of results in the club’s history, with eight consecutive losses and eleven games without a win. Ney Franco was sacked during the Recopa, and Paulo Autuori, the coach who won the Libertadores and Club World Cup with the club eight years earlier, was hired. The experienced Clemente Rodríguez was the only reinforcement in the international transfer window.

On their European tour, São Paulo held off Bayern Munich for 55 minutes in the 2013 Audi Cup debut until Mandžukić opened the scoring, and the team ended up losing 2-0. In the third-place match against Milan, they also lost 1-0. In the 2013 Eusébio Cup, São Paulo broke a fourteen-game winless streak, winning 2-0 and claiming the trophy, presented by Eusébio himself. In Japan, for the 2013 Suruga Bank Championship, São Paulo finished as runners-up, losing 3-2 to Kashima Antlers, with three goals from Osako, one in the final minute.

The 2014 season started poorly, with an elimination in the Campeonato Paulista quarter-finals on penalties against Penapolense, considered the weakest team among those qualified for the knockout stage. The poor form continued in the 2014 Copa do Brasil, with a third-round elimination against Bragantino, but São Paulo managed to recover and finished the season as Campeonato Brasileiro runners-up.

In 2015, São Paulo had a strong first phase in the Paulista but was again eliminated in the semifinal by Santos, a fate repeated in November in the 2015 Copa do Brasil. In the 2015 Copa Libertadores, they were knocked out by Cruzeiro in the round of 16 on penalties. In the second half of the year, they had an inconsistent campaign in the Campeonato Brasileiro, amid a political crisis that culminated in the resignation of president Carlos Miguel Aidar due to corruption allegations, but managed to secure a spot in the preliminary rounds of the 2016 Copa Libertadores. Carlos Augusto de Barros e Silva, known as Leco, was elected to complete Aidar’s term and was later re-elected in 2017.

After securing a place in the group stage of the continental competition in two matches against César Vallejo, São Paulo started poorly, losing to The Strongest at Pacaembu and drawing with River Plate and Trujillanos away. A recovery came with two victories at Morumbi against these opponents, allowing São Paulo to play for a draw in La Paz against The Strongest. A 1-1 result secured their place in the round of 16. In the knockout stages, São Paulo eliminated Toluca and Atlético Mineiro before facing Atlético Nacional in the semifinals. In two matches marred by poor refereeing, São Paulo was eliminated.

In the Campeonato Paulista, the club had an inconsistent campaign and had to play a single quarter-final match in Osasco against Audax, where they were thrashed 4-1. The Campeonato Brasileiro campaign was even worse, with the club spending much of the championship in the bottom half of the table and finishing in tenth place. Mid-season, the board had to replace Argentine coach Edgardo Bauza, who left to manage the Argentina national football team, with Ricardo Gomes. Under the shadow of Rogério Ceni, who was considered to take over as coach, Gomes was sacked in November. A few days later, the former goalkeeper was announced as the coach for 2017.

Rogério’s debut as coach started with a team that scored many goals but also conceded many. While the coach tried to fix this issue, the team was eliminated in less than a month in the semifinals of the Campeonato Paulista, the round of 32 of the 2017 Copa do Brasil, and the first phase of the 2017 Copa Sudamericana by Defensa y Justicia, who were making their international competition debut. With a terrible start in the Campeonato Brasileiro, the board could not withstand the pressure and sacked Rogério, with the team in the relegation zone. His replacement, Dorival Júnior, received reinforcements such as Hernanes and led the team to one of the best second-half campaigns, but could not escape a modest 13th-place finish.

However, following a defeat to Palmeiras in the 2018 Campeonato Paulista, Dorival was dismissed from his position. His replacement, Diego Aguirre, reached the semifinal of the same tournament and came close to eliminating Corinthians, but a late goal led to a penalty shootout, ending the dream of breaking the state title drought that year. For the second consecutive year, São Paulo failed to reach the round of 16 of the 2018 Copa do Brasil (eliminated by Atlético Paranaense) and was knocked out by Colón in the 2018 Copa Sudamericana.

In the Campeonato Brasileiro, the team had its best first-half campaign, winning the symbolic title, but injuries and dips in form from some players exposed a squad with few alternatives, unable to maintain the same pace in the second half of the season. Besides losing the title, São Paulo also lost a direct spot in the group stage of the 2019 Copa Libertadores, finishing in a frustrating fifth place. Aguirre was sacked with five rounds to go, with the board trying to maintain at least fourth place under interim coach André Jardine, but the change did not yield the desired results.

With Jardine confirmed as head coach at the start of 2019, São Paulo began the Libertadores preliminary round against Talleres de Córdoba, losing in Argentina and failing to overturn the result at Morumbi, drawing 0-0 and being eliminated in the preliminary phase. As the Campeonato Paulista campaign was also poor, Jardine was sacked. The board hired Cuca to replace him, but had to wait nearly two months while the coach recovered from health issues. During this period, Vagner Mancini took over, managing to qualify for the Paulista knockout stage in the final round. After eliminating Ituano, São Paulo faced the favored Palmeiras in the semifinal. After two goalless draws, the spot was decided on penalties, and São Paulo prevailed, reaching their first Campeonato Paulista final since 2003 Campeonato Paulista. With another late goal in the return leg against Corinthians, the team had to settle for the runner-up position.

Throughout the year, the team struggled to score goals, recording its worst offensive output in history. This was evident not only in the goalless Libertadores elimination but also in the round of 16 exit in the 2019 Copa do Brasil against Bahia, with two 1-0 losses. Despite having the eighth-worst attack in the Campeonato Brasileiro, São Paulo secured a spot in the group stage of the 2020 Copa Libertadores, thanks to the titles won by Flamengo and Athletico Paranaense in the Libertadores and Copa do Brasil, respectively, which opened two additional spots in the Brasileiro. However, the result did not come under Cuca, who resigned in September, being replaced by Fernando Diniz.

The 2019 balance sheet closed with a deficit of over 150 million reais, raising concerns about the club’s financial health, a situation later worsened by the COVID-19 pandemic in Brazil in 2020, which halted competitions in March. Upon the return of competitions, São Paulo's participation in the Campeonato Paulista came to an end with a 3-2 defeat at the hands of Mirassol at Morumbi in the semifinal round, fell in the group stage of the 2020 Copa Libertadores finishing third in their group, and consequently entered the Copa Sudamericana directly against Lanús. With a 3-2 loss in the first leg in Argentina and a 4-3 win at Morumbi, with the Argentine team scoring in the final seconds, São Paulo was eliminated again, this time due to the away goals rule. In national competitions, the club led the Campeonato Brasileiro for a few rounds but could not maintain the advantage, finishing fourth and also being eliminated in the Copa do Brasil semifinals by Grêmio.

== End of the title drought, Copa do Brasil title, and "Champion of Everything" — 2021 to 2024 ==
After several years of failure, the club returned to winning titles by clinching the 2021 Campeonato Paulista when they defeated rivals Palmeiras 2-0 in the final at the Morumbi stadium on 23 May 2021. The following year, the club reached two championship finals: the Campeonato Paulista and the Copa Sudamericana, but lost both, with the state final lost to Palmeiras and the continental final to Independiente del Valle. After these two setbacks, the club strove to win its first Copa do Brasil in 2023, putting together an impressive campaign by eliminating their two biggest rivals, defeating Palmeiras in the quarter-finals and Corinthians in the semifinals, before winning the title against Flamengo with a 1-0 victory at Maracanã and a 1-1 draw at Morumbi.

On 4 February 2024, São Paulo faced rivals Palmeiras at Mineirão for the 2024 Supercopa Rei. The match ended 0-0 in normal time and went to penalties. The Tricolor Paulista won 4-2 on penalties and claimed the Supercopa for the first time. São Paulo became the first and only Brazilian club to win every possible title when they won the Supercopa.

== See also ==
- São Paulo FC kit history
- List of São Paulo FC managers

== Bibliography ==
- "Fédération Internationale de Football Association - FIFA". FIFA.
- "Confederación Sudamericana de Fútbol - CONMEBOL" (in Spanish). CONMEBOL.
- "Confederação Brasileira de Futebol - CBF". Confederação Brasileira de Futebol.
- "Federação Paulista de Futebol - FPF". FPF.
- "The International Federation of Football History & Statistics - IFFHS" (in German, Spanish, French, and English). IFFHS.
- "São Paulo (São Paulo Futebol Clube) - Futpédia". Futpédia. Archived from the original on 20 January 2015.
- PENIZA, Israel. "Tricolormania". Tricolormania.
- "G.R.E.C. Tricolor Independente". Independente.
- "Dragões da Real". Dragões da Real.
- "TricolorPaulista.Net". TricolorPaulista.Net.
- Revista Oficial do São Paulo. São Paulo: Editora Panini.
- DA COSTA, Alexandre (2005). "Almanaque do São Paulo". Placar (1284-A). Rio de Janeiro: Editora Abril: 482. EAN-13 789 361402 948 1.
- GIACOMINI, Conrado (2005). São Paulo. Vol. 1 (1st ed.). Rio de Janeiro: Ediouro. p. 320. ISBN 8500015721.
- MELLO, Selton (2007). O dia em que me tornei…. Vol. 1 (1st ed.). São Paulo: Panda Books. p. 108. ISBN 978-8587537836.
- CENI, Rogério (2009). Maioridade Penal. Vol. 1 (1st ed.). São Paulo: Panda Books. p. 200. ISBN 9788578880057.
- de LOYOLA BRANDÃO, Ignácio (1994). São Paulo Futebol Clube (in Portuguese and English) (1st ed.). São Paulo: Editora DBA. p. 144. ISBN 8572340351.
