= 1974 Copa Libertadores finals =

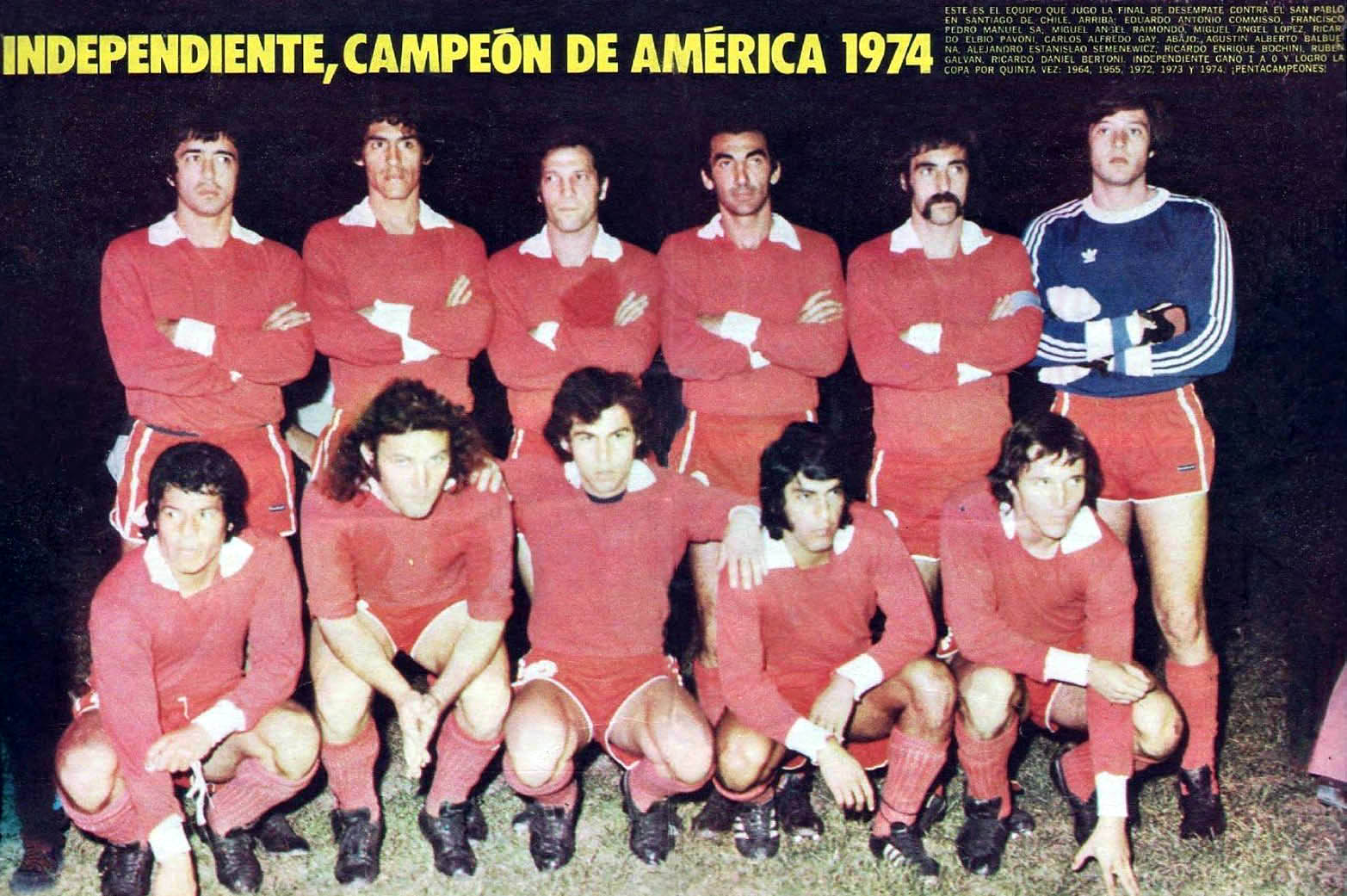
- Independiente, champions
- Event: 1974 Copa Libertadores
| São Paulo | Independiente |
| (Brazil) | (Argentina) |
- 2–2 on points Independiente won after a play-off

First leg
| São Paulo | Independiente |
| 2 | 1 |
- Date: 12 October 1974
- Venue: Estadio do Pacaembu, São Paulo
- Referee: Edison Pérez (Peru)
- Attendance: 51,000

Second leg
| Independiente | São Paulo |
| 2 | 0 |
- Date: 16 October 1974
- Venue: Estadio Doble Visera, Avellaneda
- Referee: Ramón Barreto (Uruguay)
- Attendance: 55,000

Play-off
| Independiente | São Paulo |
| 1 | 0 |
- Date: 19 October 1974
- Venue: Estadio Nacional, Santiago
- Referee: César Orozco (Peru)
- Attendance: 45,000

The 1974 Copa Libertadores finals was the final two-legged tie to determine the 1974 Copa Libertadores champion. It was contested by Argentine club Independiente and Brazilian club São Paulo. The first leg of the tie was played on 12 October at Pacaembú of São Paulo while the second leg was held at La Doble Visera of Avellaneda, on 16 October.

After both teams won one game each, a playoff was played at Estadio Nacional de Santiago on 19 October. Independiente crowned champion after beating Sao Paulo 1–0, achieving its 5th cup.

== Qualified teams ==
| Team | Previous finals app. |
|---|---|
| (Brazil) São Paulo | None |
| (Argentina) Independiente | **1964**, **1965**, **1972**, **1973** |

Bold indicates winning years

== Venues ==
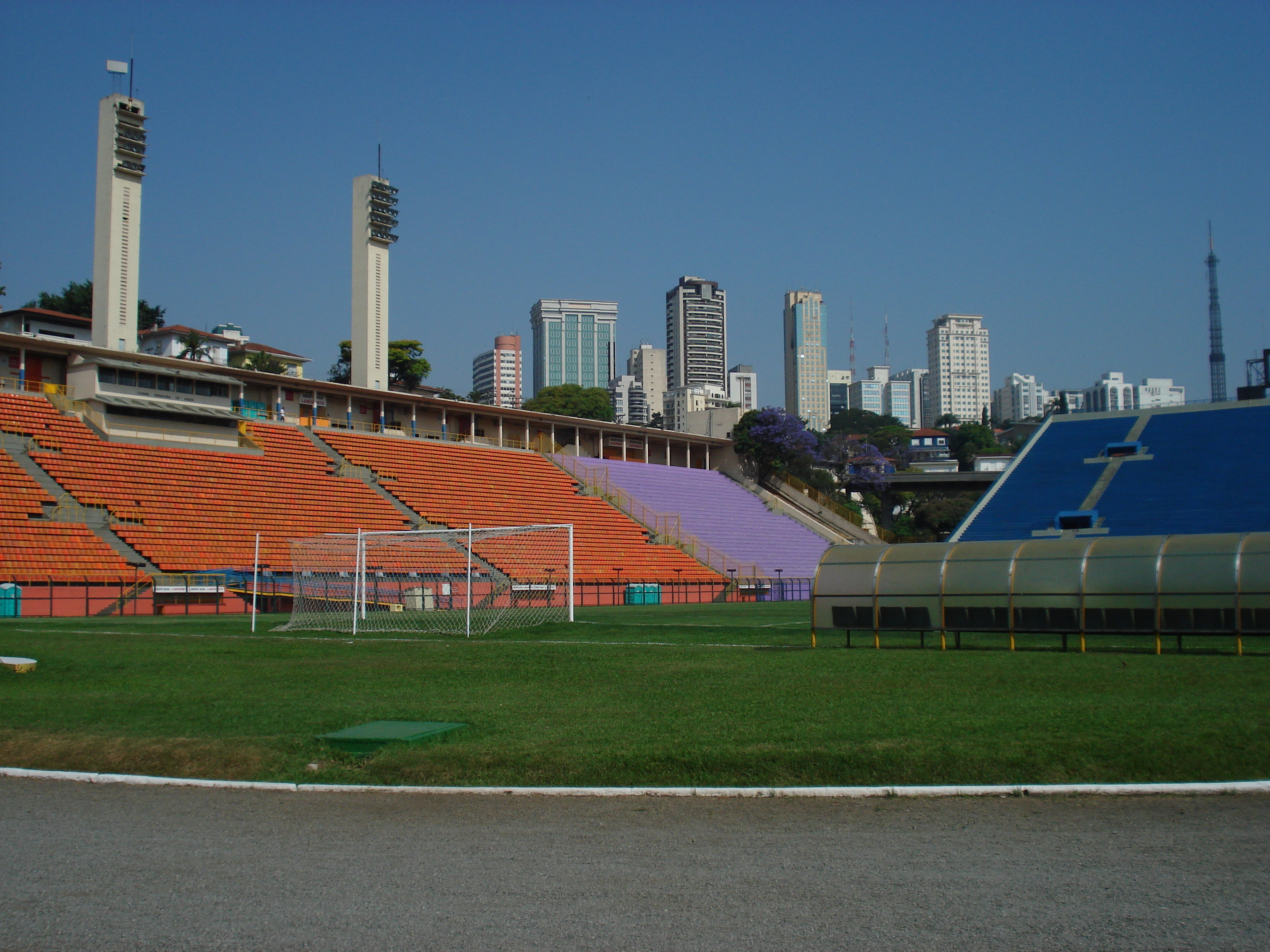
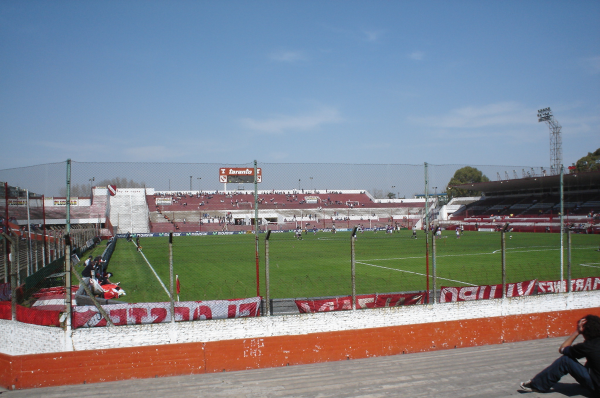
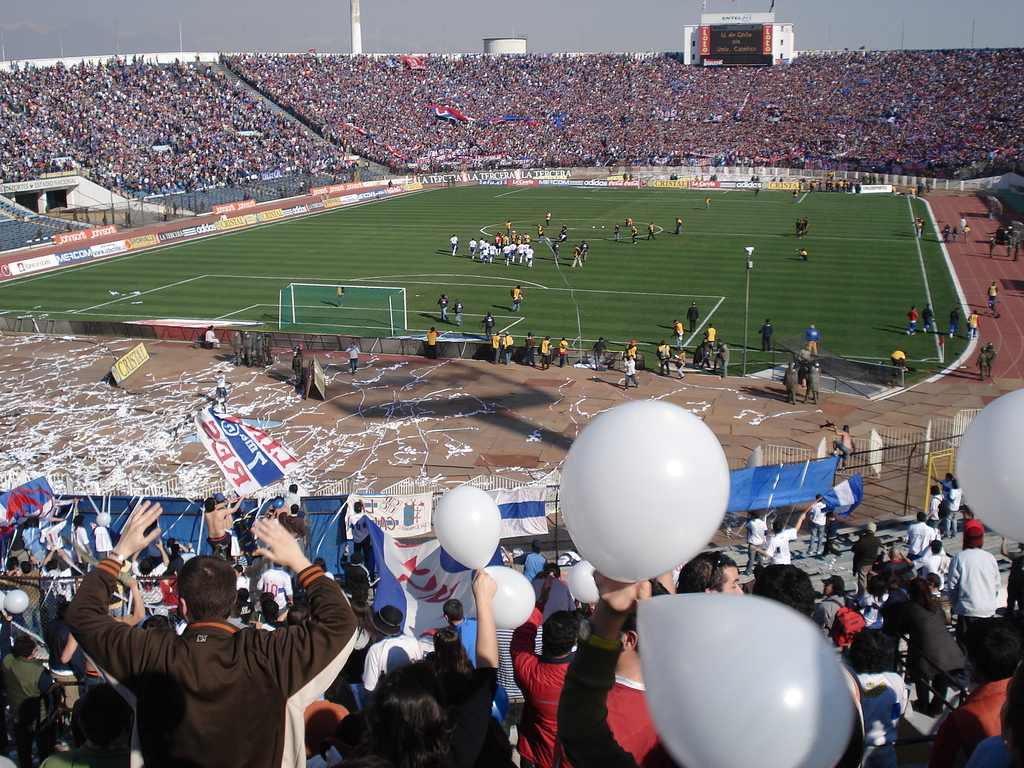
Estadio do Pacaembu (São Paulo), La Doble Visera (Avellaneda) and Estadio Nacional (Santiago) hosted the two legs and playoff match respectively

== Match details ==
=== First leg ===
1974 Copa Libertadores finals
12 October 1974
First leg

| São Paulo (Brazil) | 2–1 | (Argentina) Independiente |
|---|---|---|
| Rocha 48'; Mirandinha 50' | | Saggiorato 28' |

Pacaembu, São Paulo
Attendance: 50,000
Referee: Edilson Pérez (Peru)

**Sao Paulo**
**Independiente**

| GK | (Brazil) Waldir Peres |
| DF | (Brazil) Nelson (c) |
| DF | (Brazil) Paranhos |
| DF | (Brazil) Arlindo |
| DF | (Brazil) Gilberto Sorriso |
| MF | (Brazil) Ademir | (substituted off) 46' |
| MF | (Brazil) Zé Carlos | (substituted off) 82' |
| MF | (Uruguay) Pedro Rocha |
| MF | (Brazil) Terto |
| FW | (Brazil) Mirandinha |
| FW | (Brazil) Piau |
Substitutes:
| MF | (Brazil) Chicão | (substituted on) 46' |
| FW | (Brazil) Mauro | (substituted on) 82' |
Manager:
(Argentina) José Poy

| GK | (Argentina) Carlos Gay |
| DF | (Argentina) Eduardo Commisso |
| DF | (Argentina) Francisco Sá (c) |
| DF | (Argentina) Miguel Ángel López |
| DF | (Uruguay) Ricardo Pavoni |
| MF | (Argentina) Rubén Galván |
| MF | (Argentina) Miguel Ángel Raimondo |
| MF | (Argentina) Hugo Saggiorato |
| FW | (Argentina) Agustín Balbuena |
| FW | (Argentina) Ricardo Bochini |
| FW | (Argentina) Daniel Bertoni |
Manager:
(Argentina) Roberto Ferreiro

=== Second leg ===
16 October 1974
Second leg

| Independiente (Argentina) | 2–0 | (Brazil) São Paulo |
|---|---|---|
| Bochini 34'; Balbuena 48' |

Estadio Independiente, Avellaneda
Attendance: 55,000
Referee: Ramón Barreto (Uruguay)

| **Independiente** | **Sao Paulo** |

| GK | (Argentina) Carlos Gay |
| DF | (Argentina) Eduardo Commisso |
| DF | (Argentina) Francisco Sá (c) |
| DF | (Argentina) Miguel Ángel López |
| DF | (Uruguay) Ricardo Pavoni |
| MF | (Argentina) Rubén Galván |
| MF | (Argentina) Miguel Ángel Raimondo |
| MF | (Argentina) Hugo Saggiorato |
| FW | (Argentina) Agustín Balbuena |
| FW | (Argentina) Ricardo Bochini |
| FW | (Argentina) Daniel Bertoni | (substituted off) 80' |
Substitutes:
| MF | (Argentina) Alejandro Semenewicz | (substituted on) 80' |
Manager:
(Argentina) Roberto Ferreiro

| GK | (Brazil) Waldir Peres |
| DF | (Brazil) Nelson (c) |
| DF | (Brazil) Paranhos |
| DF | (Brazil) Arlindo |
| DF | (Brazil) Gilberto Sorriso |
| MF | (Brazil) Chicão |
| MF | (Brazil) Terto |
| MF | (Uruguay) Pedro Rocha |
| MF | (Brazil) Mauro |
| FW | (Brazil) Mirandinha |
| FW | (Brazil) Piau |
Manager:
(Argentina) José Poy

=== Playoff ===
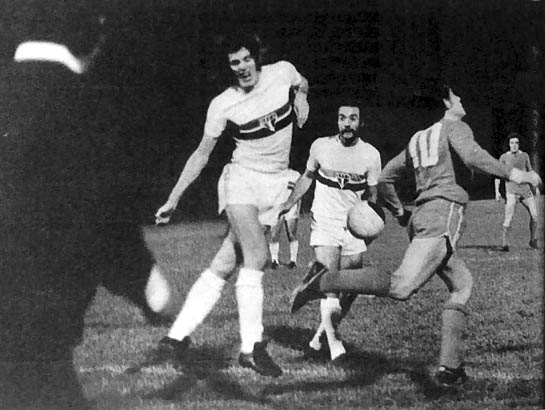
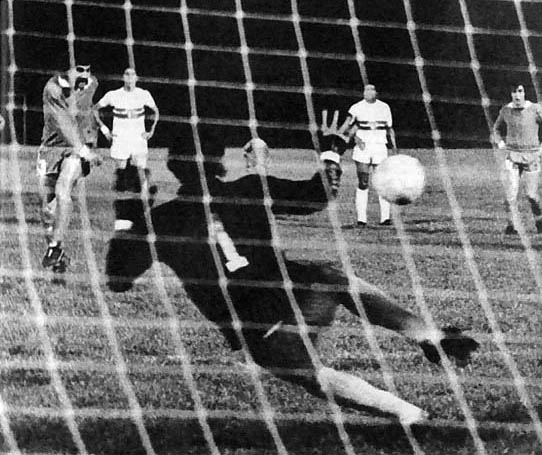
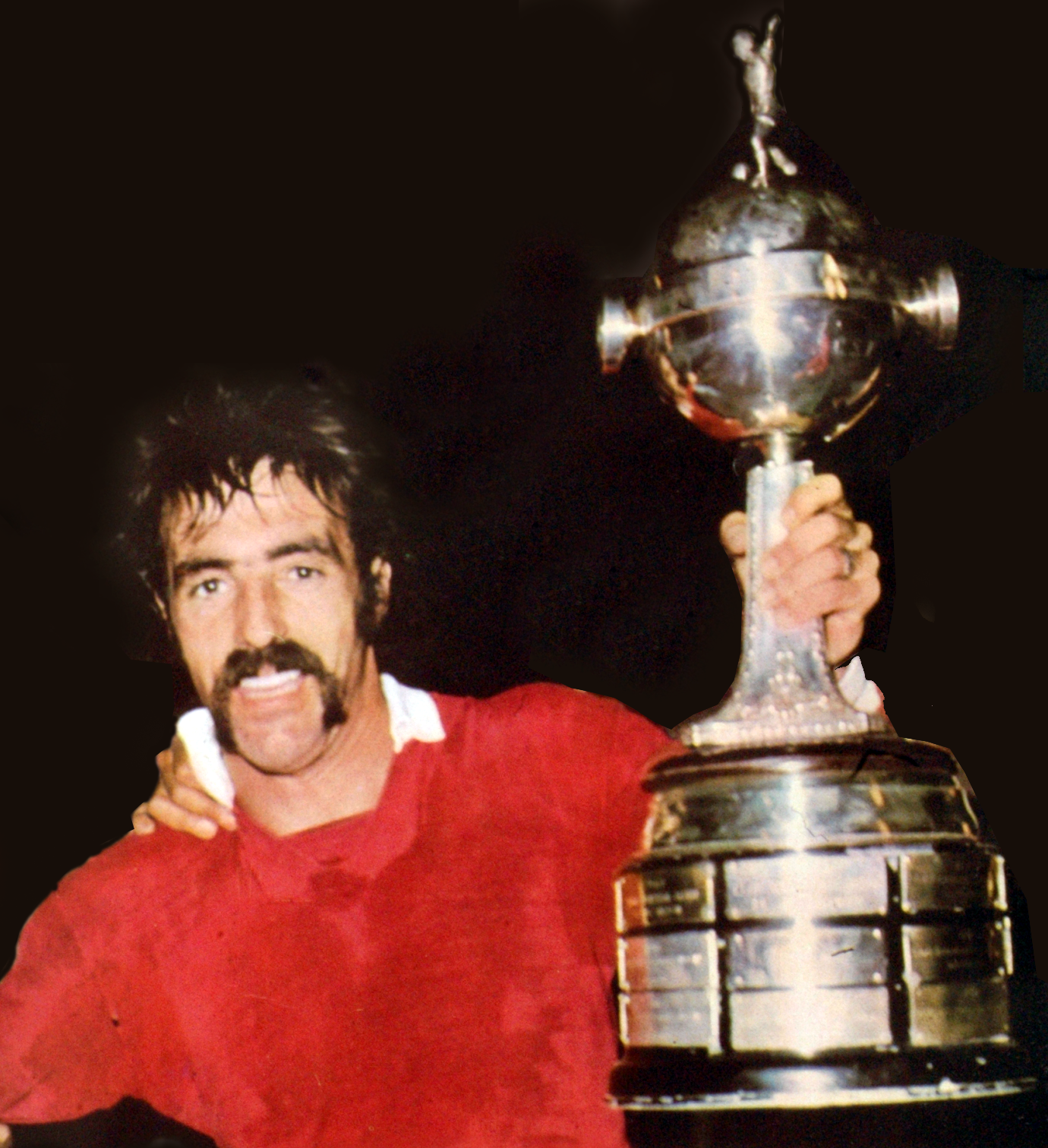
Some moments of the playoff held in Santiago, Chile
19 October 1974
Playoff

| Independiente (Argentina) | 1–0 | (Brazil) São Paulo |
|---|---|---|
| Pavoni 37' |

Estadio Nacional, Santiago
Referee: César Orozco (Peru)

| **Independiente** | **Sao Paulo** |

| GK | (Argentina) Carlos Gay |
| DF | (Argentina) Eduardo Commisso |
| DF | (Argentina) Francisco Sá (c) |
| DF | (Argentina) Miguel Ángel López |
| DF | (Uruguay) Ricardo Pavoni |
| MF | (Argentina) Alejandro Semenewicz |
| MF | (Argentina) Miguel Ángel Raimondo |
| MF | (Argentina) Rubén Galván |
| FW | (Argentina) Agustín Balbuena | (substituted off) 77' |
| FW | (Argentina) Ricardo Bochini |
| FW | (Argentina) Daniel Bertoni | (substituted off) 85' |
Substitutes:
| MF | (Argentina) Osvaldo Carrica | (substituted on) 77' |
| FW | (Argentina) Luis Giribet | (substituted on) 85' |
Manager:
(Argentina) Roberto Ferreiro

| GK | (Brazil) Waldir Peres |
| DF | (Uruguay) Pablo Forlán |
| DF | (Brazil) Paranhos |
| DF | (Brazil) Arlindo |
| DF | (Brazil) Gilberto Sorriso | (substituted off) 46' |
| MF | (Brazil) Chicão |
| MF | (Brazil) Zé Carlos | (substituted off) 82' |
| MF | (Uruguay) Pedro Rocha (c) |
| MF | (Brazil) Mauro |
| FW | (Brazil) Mirandinha |
| FW | (Brazil) Piau |
Substitutes:
| DF | (Brazil) Nelson | (substituted on) 46' |
| MF | (Brazil) Silva | (substituted on) 82' |
Manager:
(Argentina) José Poy
