= 1975 São Paulo FC season =

São Paulo
1975 season
- Chairman: Henri Couri Aidar
- Manager: José Poy
- Campeonato Brasileiro: Third stage
- Campeonato Paulista: Champions (11th title)
- Top goalscorer: League: Serginho (11); All: Serginho (35)

The 1975 football season was São Paulo's 46th season since club's existence.

== Statistics ==
=== Scorers ===
Position	Nation	Playing position	Name	Campeonato Paulista	Campeonato Brasileiro	Others	Total
1	(Brazil)	FW	Serginho	22	11	2	35
2	(Brazil)	MF	Pedro Rocha	11	3	3	17
3	(Brazil)	MF	Muricy	4	5	0	9
4	(Brazil)	MF	Chicão	5	1	1	7
=	(Brazil)	FW	Mauro	4	3	0	7
=	(Brazil)	FW	Terto	5	2	0	7
5	(Brazil)	FW	Arlindo Fazolin	0	5	0	5
6	(Brazil)	MF	Zé Carlos	3	0	1	4
7	(Brazil)	MF	Ademir	0	3	0	3
8	(Brazil)	DF	Gilberto Sorriso	2	0	0	2
=	(Brazil)	FW	Liminha	1	0	1	2
9	(Brazil)	FW	Eron	1	0	0	1
=	(Brazil)	DF	Nélson	0	0	1	1
=	(Brazil)	FW	Piau	1	0	0	1
			Own goals	2	2	0	4
			Total	60	35	9	104

=== Overall ===
Games played	72 (35 Campeonato Paulista, 28 Campeonato Brasileiro, 9 Friendly match)
Games won	42 (26 Campeonato Paulista, 11 Campeonato Brasileiro, 5 Friendly match)
Games drawn	24 (7 Campeonato Paulista, 14 Campeonato Brasileiro, 3 Friendly match)
Games lost	5 (2 Campeonato Paulista, 3 Campeonato Brasileiro, 1 Friendly match)
Goals scored	104
Goals conceded	40
Goal difference	+64
Best result	5–0 (H) v Noroeste - Campeonato Paulista - 1975.07.10
Worst result	1–2 (A) v Santos - Campeonato Paulista - 1975.08.07; 1–2 (H) v Portuguesa - Campeonato Brasileiro - 1975.11.23; 1–2 (H) v Grêmio - Campeonato Brasileiro - 1975.11.29
Most appearances	Waldir Peres (67)
Top scorer	Serginho (35)

Source: São Paulo FC

== Friendlies ==
Feb 23 National	Araçatuba	0–1	São Paulo	Araçatuba
			Serginho 75'	Referee: Édson Pantozzi

Sep 7 National	Brazil Youth Team	1–0	(Brazil) São Paulo	São Paulo
	Goal

Dec 7 Taça Hermano de Almeida	Botafogo-PB	0–1	São Paulo	João Pessoa
			Serginho 25'	Stadium: Estádio José Américo de Almeida Filho (Almeidão); Attendance: 6,515; Referee: Jair Pereira

=== Torneio Laudo Natel ===
Jan 15 National	São Paulo	0–0	Portuguesa	São Paulo
				Stadium: Estádio Palestra Itália (Parque Artarctica); Attendance: 6,040; Referee: José de Assis Aragão

Jan 19 National	Noroeste	0–0	São Paulo	Bauru
				Stadium: Estádio Doutor Alfredo de Castilho; Referee: Oscar Scolfaro

Jan 22 National	Marília	0–1	São Paulo	Marília
			Pedro Rocha 20'	Stadium: Estádio Municipal Bento de Abreu Sampaio Vidal; Attendance: 6,252; Referee: Roberto Nunes Morgado

Jan 29 National	São Paulo	2–0	Paulista	São Paulo
	Pedro Rocha 42', 52'			Stadium: Estádio Palestra Itália (Parque Artarctica); Attendance: 2,162; Referee: Almir Laguna

=== I Copa Internacional de São Paulo ===
Feb 1 International	São Paulo (Brazil)	2–0	(Uruguay) Peñarol	São Paulo
	Nélson 81'; Chicão 90'			Stadium: Estádio Cícero Pompeu de Toledo (Morumbi); Attendance: 15,900; Referee: José Favilli Neto

Feb 2 International	São Paulo (Brazil)	2–2 (3–4 p)	(Brazil) Corinthians	São Paulo
	Liminha 35'; Zé Carlos 37'		Vaguinho 63'; Zezé 76'	Stadium: Estádio Cícero Pompeu de Toledo (Morumbi); Attendance: 18,418; Referee: Romualdo Arppi Filho

== Official competitions ==
=== Campeonato Paulista ===
Mar 2 First stage 1	São Paulo	4–0	Paulista	São Paulo
	Chicão 5'; Muricy 14'; Zé Carlos 27'; Serginho 41'			Stadium: Estádio Cícero Pompeu de Toledo (Morumbi); Attendance: 5,250; Referee: Romualdo Arppi Filho

Mar 5 First stage 2	Comercial	0–2	São Paulo	Ribeirão Preto
			Zé Carlos 42'; Serginho 88'	Stadium: Estádio Dr. Francisco de Palma Travassos; Attendance: 8,644; Referee: Oscar Scolfaro

Mar 8 First stage 3	São Paulo	4–0	Ferroviária	São Paulo
	Serginho 8', 20'; Chicão 25', 83'			Stadium: Estádio Cícero Pompeu de Toledo (Morumbi); Attendance: 4,639; Referee: Almir Laguna

Mar 16 First stage 4	São Paulo	0–0	Guarani	São Paulo
				Stadium: Estádio Cícero Pompeu de Toledo (Morumbi); Referee: Armando Marques

Mar 19 First stage 5	São Paulo	2–1	Marília	São Paulo
	Serginho 71'; Pedro Rocha 72'		Itamar 38'	Stadium: Estádio Municipal Paulo Machado de Carvalho (Pacaembu); Attendance: 9,737; Referee: Nilton Cardoso

Mar 23 First stage 6	América	0–1	São Paulo	São José do Rio Preto
			Mauro 61'	Stadium: Estádio Mário Alves de Mendonça; Referee: Dulcídio Wanderley Boschilia

Mar 29 First stage 7	Corinthians	0–2	São Paulo	São Paulo
			Serginho 39'; Pedro Rocha 79'	Stadium: Estádio Municipal Paulo Machado de Carvalho (Pacaembu); Attendance: 51,999; Referee: Romualdo Arppi Filho

Apr 5 First stage 8	São Paulo	1–0	XV de Piracicaba	São Paulo
	Serginho 7'			Stadium: Estádio Cícero Pompeu de Toledo (Morumbi); Attendance: 16,591; Referee: José de Assis Aragão

Apr 13 First stage 9	Portuguesa	0–0	São Paulo	São Paulo
				Stadium: Estádio Municipal Paulo Machado de Carvalho (Pacaembu); Attendance: 42,386; Referee: Armando Marques

Apr 16 First stage 10	Portuguesa Santista	0–1	São Paulo	Santos
			Eron 82'	Stadium: Estádio Ulrico Mursa; Referee: Almir Laguna

Apr 20 First stage 11	Ponte Preta	1–2	São Paulo	Campinas
	Rui Rei 36'		Terto 6', 21'	Stadium: Estádio Moisés Lucarelli; Attendance: 15,760; Referee: Roberto Nunes Morgado

Apr 23 First stage 12	Botafogo	0–1	São Paulo	Ribeirão Preto
			Pedro Rocha 69'	Stadium: Estádio Santa Cruz; Attendance: 14,830; Referee: Oscar Scolfaro

Apr 26 First stage 13	São Paulo	3–2	Juventus	São Paulo
	Pedro Rocha 45'; Serginho 66'; Terto 85'		Pedrinho 31'; Vanderlei 87'	Stadium: Estádio Cícero Pompeu de Toledo (Morumbi); Attendance: 18,444; Referee: Dulcídio Wanderley Boschilia

May 4 First stage 14	São Paulo	2–0	Santos	São Paulo
	Pedro Rocha 13', 76'			Stadium: Estádio Cícero Pompeu de Toledo (Morumbi); Attendance: 39,666; Referee: Armando Marques

May 7 First stage 15	São Paulo	2–1	São Bento	São Paulo
	Pedro Rocha 9'; Muricy 33'		Odair 60'	Stadium: Estádio Cícero Pompeu de Toledo (Morumbi); Attendance: 11,339; Referee: José Favilli Neto

May 10 First stage 16	Saad	0–1	São Paulo	São Paulo
			Serginho 3'	Stadium: Estádio Municipal Paulo Machado de Carvalho (Pacaembu); Attendance: 31,351; Referee: Romualdo Arppi Filho

May 18 First stage 17	Noroeste	0–0	São Paulo	Bauru
				Stadium: Estádio Doutor Alfredo de Castilho; Attendance: 11,773; Referee: Roberto Nunes Morgado

May 25 First stage 18	São Paulo	1–0	Palmeiras	São Paulo
	Pedro Rocha 72'			Stadium: Estádio Cícero Pompeu de Toledo (Morumbi); Attendance: 42,318; Referee: Romualdo Arppi Filho

May 29 Second stage 1	São Paulo	3–0	Portuguesa Santista	São Paulo
	Serginho 36', 58'; Gilberto 40'			Stadium: Estádio Cícero Pompeu de Toledo (Morumbi); Attendance: 18,874; Referee: José Favilli Neto

Jun 1 Second stage 2	Marília	1–3	São Paulo	Marília
	Zé Carlos 40'		Chicão 21'; Mauro 61'; Serginho 65'	Stadium: Estádio Municipal Bento de Abreu Sampaio Vidal; Attendance: 8,956; Referee: Dulcídio Wanderley Boschilia

Jun 8 Second stage 3	Portuguesa	1–1	São Paulo	São Paulo
	Enéas 78'		Muricy 70'	Stadium: Estádio Municipal Paulo Machado de Carvalho (Pacaembu); Attendance: 28,028; Referee: Armando Marques

Jun 15 Second stage 4	Paulista	0–1	São Paulo	Jundiaí
			Chicão 53'	Stadium: Estádio Dr. Jayme Pinheiro de Ulhoa Cintra; Attendance: 11,451; Referee: Romualdo Arppi Filho

Jun 25 Second stage 5	São Paulo	3–0	São Bento	São Paulo
	Mauro 30', 31'; Serginho 75'			Stadium: Estádio Cícero Pompeu de Toledo (Morumbi); Attendance: 2,536; Referee: Almir Laguna

Jun 29 Second stage 6	São Paulo	1–0	Santos	São Paulo
	Terto 16'			Stadium: Estádio Cícero Pompeu de Toledo (Morumbi); Attendance: 25,443; Referee: José de Assis Aragão

Jul 5 Second stage 7	São Paulo	3–1	Comercial	São Paulo
	Serginho 3', 32', 89'		Ziquita 17'	Stadium: Estádio Cícero Pompeu de Toledo (Morumbi); Attendance: 6,085; Referee: Édson Pantozi

Jul 10 Second stage 8	São Paulo	5–0	Noroeste	São Paulo
	Terto 21'; Araújo 28' (o.g.); Gilberto 34'; Serginho 38'; China 74' (o.g.)			Stadium: Estádio Municipal Paulo Machado de Carvalho (Pacaembu); Referee: Romualdo Arppi Filho

Jul 13 Second stage 9	Botafogo	2–4	São Paulo	Ribeirão Preto
	Luís Carlos 12'; Zito 86'		Piau 7'; Serginho 44', 72'; Pedro Rocha 57'	Stadium: Estádio Santa Cruz; Attendance: 9,754; Referee: Roberto Nunes Morgado

Jul 20 Second stage 10	Palmeiras	1–1	São Paulo	São Paulo
	Levinha 32'		Muricy 62'	Stadium: Estádio Municipal Paulo Machado de Carvalho (Pacaembu); Attendance: 54,307; Referee: Edson Pantozzi

Jul 27 Third stage 1	São Paulo	1–1	Portuguesa	São Paulo
	Serginho 52'		Enéas 22'	Stadium: Estádio Cícero Pompeu de Toledo (Morumbi); Attendance: 78,239; Referee: Roberto Nunes Morgado

Jul 30 Third stage 2	América	0–1	São Paulo	São José do Rio Preto
			Liminha 78'	Stadium: Estádio Mário Alves de Mendonça; Attendance: 23,159; Referee: José Favilli Neto

Aug 3 Third stage 3	São Paulo	0–0	Palmeiras	São Paulo
				Stadium: Estádio Cícero Pompeu de Toledo (Morumbi); Attendance: 67,656; Referee: Romualdo Arppi Filho

Aug 7 Third stage 4	Santos	2–1	São Paulo	São Paulo
	Claudio Adão 6', 81'		Pedro Rocha 26'	Stadium: Estádio Cícero Pompeu de Toledo (Morumbi); Attendance: 23,058; Referee: Armando Marques

Aug 10 Third stage 5	São Paulo	2–1	Corinthians	São Paulo
	Serginho 36', 56'		Cláudio 71'	Stadium: Estádio Cícero Pompeu de Toledo (Morumbi); Referee: Romualdo Arppi Filho

Aug 14 Finals	São Paulo	1–0	Portuguesa	São Paulo
	Pedro Rocha 43'			Stadium: Estádio Cícero Pompeu de Toledo (Morumbi); Attendance: 23,600; Referee: Armando Marques

Aug 17 Finals	Portuguesa	1–0 (a.e.t.) (1–1 agg.) (0–3 p)	São Paulo	São Paulo
	Eneás 31'			Stadium: Estádio Cícero Pompeu de Toledo (Morumbi); Attendance: 57,137; Referee: Dulcídio Wanderley Boschilla
	Penalties
	Tatá (penalty missed); Dicá (penalty missed); Wilsinho (penalty missed)		Pedro Rocha (penalty scored); Serginho (penalty scored); Chicão (penalty scored)

==== Record ====
Final Position	Points	Matches	Wins	Draws	Losses	Goals For	Goals Away	Win%
1st	59	35	26	7	2	60	16	84%

=== Campeonato Brasileiro ===
Aug 20 First stage 1	Sergipe	0–0	São Paulo	Aracaju
				Stadium: Estádio Lourival Baptista (Batistão); Attendance: 21,890; Referee: Arnaldo César Coelho

Aug 24 First stage 2	Santa Cruz	1–2	São Paulo	Recife
	Samuel 7' (o.g.)		Chicão 28'; Pedro Rocha 87'	Stadium: Estádio José do Rego Maciel (Arruda); Referee: Agomar Martins

Aug 27 First stage 3	Campinense	2–2	São Paulo	Campina Grande
	Dão 13'; Ageu 85'		Serginho 43'; Terto 62'	Stadium: Estádio Governador Ernani Sátyro (Amigão); Attendance: 14,616; Referee: Sebastião Rufino

Aug 31 First stage 4	América-RN	3–4	São Paulo	Natal
	Santa Cruz 53'; Ivanildo 58'; Élcio 73'		Ademir 14', 84'; Serginho 80'; Arlindo 87'	Stadium: Estádio Lagoa Nova; Attendance: 13,623; Referee: José Luís Barreto

Sep 4 First stage 5	São Paulo	2–0	Goiânia	São Paulo
	Pedro Rocha 76'; Mauro 88'			Stadium: Estádio Cícero Pompeu de Toledo (Morumbi); Attendance: 4,334; Referee: Afonso de Oliveira

Sep 10 First stage 6	São Paulo	3–0	Vitória	São Paulo
	Serginho 45', 48'; Muricy 89'			Stadium: Estádio Cícero Pompeu de Toledo (Morumbi); Referee: José Aldo Pereira

Sep 14 First stage 7	São Paulo	2–0	Flamengo	São Paulo
	Mauro 36'; Muricy 55'			Stadium: Estádio Cícero Pompeu de Toledo (Morumbi); Attendance: 26,540; Referee: Armando Marques

Sep 17 First stage 8	Figueirense	1–1	São Paulo	Florianópolis
	Zé Carlos 39'		Almeida 68' (o.g.)	Stadium: Estádio Orlando Scarpelli; Referee: Alvir Renzi

Sep 21 First stage 9	Grêmio	1–1	São Paulo	Porto Alegre
	Nenê 3'		Arlindo 14'	Stadium: Estádio Olímpico Monumental; Referee: Valquir Pimentel

Sep 28 First stage 10	São Paulo	1–0	Santos	São Paulo
	Vicente 43' (o.g.)			Stadium: Estádio Cícero Pompeu de Toledo (Morumbi); Attendance: 15,527; Referee: Dulcídio Wanderley Boschilia

Oct 1 First stage 11	Portuguesa	0–1	São Paulo	São Paulo
			Muricy 54'	Stadium: Estádio Palestra Itália (Parque Antarctica); Attendance: 6,984; Referee: José Favilli Neto

Oct 8 Second stage 1	São Paulo	1–0	Fluminense	São Paulo
	Serginho 56'			Stadium: Estádio Cícero Pompeu de Toledo (Morumbi); Attendance: 21,903; Referee: Agomar Martins

Oct 12 Second stage 2	São Paulo	0–0	Palmeiras	São Paulo
				Stadium: Estádio Cícero Pompeu de Toledo (Morumbi); Attendance: 21,356; Referee: Arnaldo César Coelho

Oct 15 Second stage 3	America-RJ	0–0	São Paulo	Rio de Janeiro
				Stadium: Estádio Jornalista Mário Filho (Maracanã); Attendance: 5,135; Referee: Sebastião Rufino

Oct 19 Second stage 4	São Paulo	0–1	Corinthians	São Paulo
			Adilson 87'	Stadium: Estádio Cícero Pompeu de Toledo (Morumbi); Attendance: 23,121; Referee: José de Assis Aragão

Oct 22 Second stage 5	Remo	2–2	São Paulo	Belém
	Alcino 5'; Elia 30'		Muricy 40'; Mauro 74'	Stadium: Estádio Evandro Almeida (Baenão); Referee: José Marçal Filho

Oct 25 Second stage 6	São Paulo	0–0	Guarani	São Paulo
				Stadium: Estádio Cícero Pompeu de Toledo (Morumbi); Attendance: 8,074; Referee: Luís Carlos Félix

Oct 29 Second stage 7	Coritiba	2–2	São Paulo	Curitiba
	Ely 14'; Osmarzinho 70'		Terto 44'; Arlindo 50'	Stadium: Estádio Belfort Duarte; Referee: Valquir Pimentel

Nov 1 Second stage 8	São Paulo	0–0	Cruzeiro	São Paulo
				Stadium: Estádio Cícero Pompeu de Toledo (Morumbi); Attendance: 13,078; Referee: José Roberto Wright

Nov 6 Second stage 9	São Paulo	2–0	Tiradentes	São Paulo
	Ademir 25'; Muricy 57'			Stadium: Estádio Cícero Pompeu de Toledo (Morumbi); Attendance: 19,772; Referee: Rubens de Souza

Nov 9 Second stage 10	Atlético Mineiro	1–1	São Paulo	Belo Horizonte
	Paulo Isidoro 72'		Arlindo 79'	Stadium: Estádio Governador Magalhães Pinto (Mineirão); Attendance: 52,350; Referee: Agomar Martins

Nov 13 Third stage 1	Sport	1–1	São Paulo	Recife
	Peri 78'		Serginho 48'	Stadium: Estádio José do Rego Maciel (Arruda); Attendance: 12,212; Referee: Luís Carlos Félix

Nov 16 Third stage 2	Flamengo	1–1	São Paulo	Rio de Janeiro
	Zico 39'		Serginho 29'	Stadium: Estádio Jornalista Mário Filho (Maracanã); Attendance: 41,904; Referee: Sebastião Rufino

Nov 19 Third stage 3	São Paulo	0–0	Internacional	São Paulo
				Stadium: Estádio Cícero Pompeu de Toledo (Morumbi); Attendance: 16,391; Referee: José Aldo Pereira

Nov 23 Third stage 4	São Paulo	1–2	Portuguesa	São Paulo
	Serginho 39'		Rui Rei 3', 72'	Stadium: Estádio Cícero Pompeu de Toledo (Morumbi); Attendance: 10,314; Referee: Armando Marques

Nov 26 Third stage 5	São Paulo	1–0	Santa Cruz	São Paulo
	Serginho 36'			Stadium: Estádio Cícero Pompeu de Toledo (Morumbi); Attendance: 3,125; Referee: Arnaldo César Coelho

Nov 29 Third stage 6	São Paulo	1–2	Grêmio	São Paulo
	Serginho 44'		Zéquinha 10'; Neca 86'	Stadium: Estádio Cícero Pompeu de Toledo (Morumbi); Attendance: 7,084; Referee: Saul Mendes

Dec 4 Third stage 7	Náutico	1–3	São Paulo	Recife
	Paraguaio 71'		Arlindo 20'; Serginho 45'; Pedro Rocha 47'	Stadium: Estádio José do Rego Maciel (Arruda); Attendance: 928; Referee: Luís Carlos Félix

==== Record ====
Final Position	Points	Matches	Wins	Draws	Losses	Goals For	Goals Away	Win%
5th	41	28	11	14	3	35	21	48%
