= 1976 São Paulo FC season =

São Paulo
1976 season
- Chairman: Henri Couri Aidar
- Manager: José Poy; Mário Juliato
- Campeonato Brasileiro: 28th
- Campeonato Paulista: Second stage
- Top goalscorer: League: Mickey (5); All: Pedro Rocha and Serginho (15)

The 1976 football season was São Paulo's 47th season since club's existence.

== Statistics ==
=== Scorers ===
| Position | Nation | Playing position | Name | Campeonato Paulista | Campeonato Brasileiro | Others | Total |
|---|---|---|---|---|---|---|---|
| 1 | (Uruguay) | MF | Pedro Rocha | 9 | 0 | 6 | 15 |
| = | (Brazil) | FW | Serginho | 9 | 2 | 4 | 15 |
| 2 | (Brazil) | FW | Mickey | 5 | 5 | 2 | 12 |
| 3 | (Brazil) | MF | Muricy | 1 | 1 | 5 | 7 |
| = | (Brazil) | FW | Terto | 4 | 1 | 2 | 7 |
| 4 | (Brazil) | MF | Ademir | 0 | 2 | 1 | 3 |
| = | (Brazil) | MF | Chicão | 3 | 0 | 0 | 3 |
| = | (Brazil) | DF | Nélson | 1 | 0 | 2 | 3 |
| 5 | (Brazil) | FW | Arlindo Fazolin | 1 | 0 | 1 | 2 |
| = | (Brazil) | DF | Bezerra | 1 | 0 | 1 | 2 |
| = | (Brazil) | FW | Mauro | 0 | 2 | 0 | 2 |
| = | (Brazil) | MF | Zé Carlos | 2 | 0 | 0 | 2 |
| 6 | (Brazil) | FW | Piau | 0 | 0 | 1 | 1 |
| = | (Brazil) | FW | Sérgio Américo | 1 | 0 | 0 | 1 |
| = | (Brazil) | MF | Silva | 0 | 1 | 0 | 1 |
| = | (Brazil) | MF | Valtinho | 0 | 0 | 1 | 1 |
| = | (Brazil) | FW | Zé Sérgio | 1 | 0 | 0 | 1 |
| | | | Own goals | 1 | 1 | 1 | 3 |
| | | | Total | 39 | 15 | 35 | 89 |

=== Overall ===
| Games played | 63 (28 Campeonato Paulista, 13 Campeonato Brasileiro, 22 Friendly match) |
| Games won | 27 (12 Campeonato Paulista, 4 Campeonato Brasileiro, 11 Friendly match) |
| Games drawn | 21 (10 Campeonato Paulista, 4 Campeonato Brasileiro, 7 Friendly match) |
| Games lost | 15 (6 Campeonato Paulista, 5 Campeonato Brasileiro, 4 Friendly match) |
| Goals scored | 89 |
| Goals conceded | 49 |
| Goal difference | +40 |
| Best result | 5–0 (H) v Noroeste - Campeonato Paulista - 1976.08.21 |
| Worst result | 0–2 (A) v Portuguesa - Friendly match - 1976.02.17; 0–2 (A) v Botafogo-SP - Campeonato Brasileiro - 1976.09.12; 0–2 (H) v Atlético Paranaense - Campeonato Brasileiro - 1976.09.15 |
| Most appearances | |
| Top scorer | Pedro Rocha and Serginho (15) |

Source: São Paulo FC

== Friendlies ==
| Apr 11 National | Goiás | 1–0 | São Paulo | Goiânia |
| | Frazão 69' | | | Stadium: Estádio do Governo do Estado de Goiás (Serra Dourada); Referee: Cid Marival |

| May 26 National | Nacional | 1–1 | São Paulo | São Paulo |
| | Goal | | Goal |

| May 30 National | São Paulo | 1–0 | São Bento | São Paulo |
| | Arlindo 14' | | | Stadium: Estádio Palestra Itália (Parque Antarctica); Attendance: 302; Referee: Márcio Campos Sales |

| Sep 26 National | Joinville | 0–3 | São Paulo | Joinville |
| | | | Goal | Stadium: Estádio Ernesto Schlemm Sobrinho |

| Oct 30 National | Santos | 1–0 | São Paulo | Santos, São Paulo |
| | Tatá 32' | | | Stadium: Estádio Urbano Caldeira (Vila Belmiro); Attendance: 5,687; Referee: Alfredo Gomes |

| Nov 4 National | São Sebastião da Grama XI | 1–4 | São Paulo | São Sebastião da Grama |
| | Goal | | Goal | Stadium: Estádio Municipal João Machado |

| Dec 15 National | Americano | 1–2 | São Paulo | Campos dos Goytacazes |
| | Zé Neto 29' | | Mickey 54'; Valtinho 57' | Stadium: Estádio Godofredo Cruz; Referee: Paulo Antunes |

=== II Copa São Paulo (Taça Governador Laudo Natel) ===
| Jan 30 National | São Paulo | 1–1 (5–4 p) | Flamengo | São Paulo |
| | Pedro Rocha 52' | | Caio Cambalhota 48' | Stadium: Estádio Cícero Pompeu de Toledo (Morumbi); Attendance: 24,419; Referee: Dulcídio Wanderley Boschilia |

| Feb 1 National | São Paulo | 1–0 | Internacional | São Paulo |
| | Pedro Rocha 45' | | | Stadium: Estádio Cícero Pompeu de Toledo (Morumbi); Attendance: 26,181; Referee: Romualdo Arppi Filho |

=== Taça Governador do Estado de São Paulo ===
| Feb 5 National | São Paulo | 2–0 | Corinthians | São Paulo |
| | Terto 24'; Serginho 59' | | | Stadium: Estádio Palestra Itália (Parque Antarctica); Attendance: 8,678; Referee: Romualdo Arppi Filho |

| Feb 8 National | Palmeiras | 0–0 | São Paulo | São Paulo |
| | | | | Stadium: Estádio Cícero Pompeu de Toledo (Morumbi); Attendance: 18,237; Referee: Oscar Scolfaro |

| Feb 12 National | Santos | 3–3 | São Paulo | São Paulo |
| | Claudio Adão 3', 50'; Marçal 90' | | Muricy 28'; Serginho 30', 52' | Stadium: Estádio Cícero Pompeu de Toledo (Morumbi); Attendance: 11,220; Referee: José Favilli Neto |

| Feb 15 National | Guarani | 1–4 | São Paulo | Campinas |
| | Zenon 62' | | Ademir 13'; Muricy 36', 52'; Piau 81' | Stadium: Estádio Brinco de Ouro da Princesa; Attendance: 23,040; Referee: Dulcídio Wanderley Boschilia |

| Feb 17 National | Poruguesa | 2–0 | São Paulo | São Paulo |
| | Enéas 7', 27' | | | Stadium: Estádio Cícero Pompeu de Toledo (Morumbi); Attendance: 11,313; Referee: Almir Laguna |

=== Taça Cidade de Maringá ===
| May 12 National | Palmeiras | 1–1 (7–8 p) | São Paulo | Maringá |
| | Toninho 36' | | Pedro Rocha 71' | Stadium: Estádio Regional Willie Davids; Referee: Bráulio Zanoto |

=== Taça Cidade de Guaíra ===
| May 23 National | São Paulo | 2–1 | Corinthians | Guaíra |
| | Bezerra 55'; Pedro Rocha 69' | | Romeu 63' | Stadium: Estádio José Zuquim Nogueira; Referee: Dulcídio Wanderley Boschilia |

=== Torneio Triangular Piracicabano ===
| Nov 7 National | Santos | 0–1 | São Paulo | Piracicaba |
| | | | Serginho 10' | Stadium: Estádio Barão da Serra Negra; Attendance: 2,224; Referee: José Guidotti |

| Nov 14 National | XV de Piracicaba | 1–1 | São Paulo | Piracicaba |
| | Paulinho 30' | | Muricy 48' | Stadium: Estádio Barão da Serra Negra; Attendance: 1,320; Referee: Paulo Arruda |

=== Torneio Nunes Freire ===
| Nov 18 National | Moto Club | 0–2 | São Paulo | São Luís |
| | | | Terto 38'; Pedro Rocha 61' | Stadium: Estádio Municipal Nhozinho Santos; Referee: Josemil Souza |

| Nov 24 National | América (MG) | 1–3 | São Paulo | São Luís |
| | Natal 37' | | Nélson 35', 49'; Mickey 81' | Stadium: Estádio Municipal Nhozinho Santos; Attendance: 3,736; Referee: Édson de Moraes |

| Nov 28 National | Sampaio Corrêa | 0–2 | São Paulo | São Luís |
| | | | Moisés 35' (o.g.); Muricy 55' | Stadium: Estádio Municipal Nhozinho Santos; Attendance: 14,504; Referee: Wilson de Morais |

| Dec 8 National | Ferroviário (MA) | 0–0 | São Paulo | São Luís |
| | | | | Stadium: Estádio Municipal Nhozinho Santos; Referee: Nacor Arouche |

| Dec 12 National | Santos | 2–1 | São Paulo | São Luís |
| | Bianchini 65'; Julinho 68' | | Pedro Rocha 63' | Stadium: Estádio Municipal Nhozinho Santos; Attendance: 1,224; Referee: Wilson de Morais |

== Official competitions ==
=== Campeonato Paulista ===
| Feb 22 First stage 1 | São Paulo | 2–0 | Noroeste | São Paulo |
| | Pedro Rocha 77'; Nélson 80' | | | Stadium: Estádio Cícero Pompeu de Toledo (Morumbi); Attendance: 4,464; Referee: Nilson Cardoso Bilha |

| Feb 28 First stage 2 | São Bento | 0–1 | São Paulo | Sorocaba |
| | | | Zé Carlos 53' | Stadium: Estádio Humberto Reale; Attendance: 7,530; Referee: Dulcídio Wanderley Boschilia |

| Mar 7 First stage 3 | Corinthians | 3–2 | São Paulo | São Paulo |
| | Vaguinho 29'; Hélinho 30'; Cláudio 53' | | Muricy 5'; Pedro Rocha 35' | Stadium: Estádio Palestra Itália (Parque Antarctica); Attendance: 31,503; Referee: Romualdo Arppi Filho |

| Mar 14 First stage 4 | Marília | 0–2 | São Paulo | Marília |
| | | | Chicão 39'; Bezerra 42' | Stadium: Bento de Abreu; Attendance: 9,731; Referee: Emídio Marques de Mesquita |

| Mar 19 First stage 5 | São Paulo | 2–0 | Ponte Preta | São Paulo |
| | Oscar 23' (o.g.); Serginho 71' | | | Stadium: Estádio Cícero Pompeu de Toledo (Morumbi); Attendance: 20,091; Referee: Alfredo Gomes |

| Mar 28 First stage 6 | Paulista | 1–3 | São Paulo | Jundiaí |
| | Brainer 82' | | Pedro Rocha 12', 20'; Zé Carlos 67' | Stadium: Estádio Municipal Doutor Jayme Pinheiro de Ulhôa Cintra; Attendance: 10,630; Referee: Oscar Scolfaro |

| Apr 4 First stage 7 | Botafogo | 0–2 | São Paulo | Ribeirão Preto |
| | | | Terto 64'; Sérgio Américo 73' | Stadium: Estádio Santa Cruz; Attendance: 20,614; Referee: Emídio Marques de Mesquita |

| Apr 18 First stage 8 | São Paulo | 1–1 | Comercial | São Paulo |
| | Serginho 56' | | João Carlos 10' | Stadium: Estádio Cícero Pompeu de Toledo (Morumbi); Attendance: 705; Referee: Oscar Scolfaro |

| Apr 21 First stage 9 | Guarani | 1–1 | São Paulo | Campinas |
| | André 53' | | Serginho 18' | Stadium: Estádio Brinco de Ouro da Princesa; Attendance: 17,684; Referee: Sílvio Acácio Silveira |

| Apr 25 First stage 10 | São Paulo | 1–0 | Ferroviária | São Paulo |
| | Pedro Rocha 40' | | | Stadium: Estádio Cícero Pompeu de Toledo (Morumbi); Attendance: 636; Referee: Almir Laguna |

| May 2 First stage 11 | São Paulo | 1–0 | Portuguesa Santista | São Paulo |
| | Pedro Rocha 88' | | | Stadium: Estádio Cícero Pompeu de Toledo (Morumbi); Attendance: 6,904; Referee: Édson Massa |

| May 8 First stage 12 | São Paulo | 1–1 | XV de Piracicaba | São Paulo |
| | Pedro Rocha 31' | | Maritaca 26' | Stadium: Estádio Cícero Pompeu de Toledo (Morumbi); Attendance: 7,689; Referee: Alfredo Gomes |

| May 16 First stage 13 | Juventus | 1–1 | São Paulo | São Paulo |
| | Pita 3' | | Arlindo 31' | Stadium: Estádio Palestra Itália (Parque Antarctica); Attendance: 8,312; Referee: Romualdo Arppi Filho |

| Jun 13 First stage 14 | São Paulo | 0–1 | América | São Paulo |
| | | | Wilson Luís 47' | Stadium: Estádio Cícero Pompeu de Toledo (Morumbi); Attendance: 360; Referee: Édson Massa |

| Jun 19 First stage 15 | São Paulo | 4–0 | Portuguesa | São Paulo |
| | Terto 7'; Serginho 58', 79'; Pedro Rocha 89' | | | Stadium: Estádio Cícero Pompeu de Toledo (Morumbi); Attendance: 6,763; Referee: Almir Laguna |

| Jun 27 First stage 16 | Santos | 0–0 | São Paulo | Santos |
| | | | | Stadium: Estádio Urbano Caldeira (Vila Belmiro); Attendance: 16,162; Referee: Oscar Scolfaro |

| Jul 4 First stage 17 | Palmeiras | 1–0 | São Paulo | São Paulo |
| | Nei 90' | | | Stadium: Estádio Municipal Paulo Machado de Carvalho (Pacaembu); Attendance: 39,788; Referee: Dulcídio Wanderley Boschilia |

| Jul 11 Second stage 1 | São Paulo | 2–2 | Portuguesa | São Paulo |
| | Mickey 25'; Chicão 70' | | Enéas 2'; Adilton 90' | Stadium: Estádio Municipal Paulo Machado de Carvalho (Pacaembu); Attendance: 16,519; Referee: Romualdo Arppi Filho |

| Jul 14 Second stage 2 | São Paulo | 1–1 | Botafogo | São Paulo |
| | Zé Sérgio 35' | | Alfredo 28' | Stadium: Estádio Cícero Pompeu de Toledo (Morumbi); Referee: José de Assis Aragão |

| Jul 18 Second stage 3 | Ponte Preta | 1–0 | São Paulo | Campinas |
| | Genau 15' | | | Stadium: Estádio Moisés Lucarelli; Attendance: 13,385; Referee: Almir Laguna |

| Jul 22 Second stage 4 | São Paulo | 5–1 | São Bento | São Paulo |
| | Chicão 27'; Terto 40'; Mickey 50', 70'; Serginho 55' | | Clodoaldo 90' | Stadium: Estádio Cícero Pompeu de Toledo (Morumbi) |

| Jul 25 Second stage 5 | São Paulo | 1–1 | Guarani | São Paulo |
| | Mickey 80' | | Campos 65' | Stadium: Estádio Cícero Pompeu de Toledo (Morumbi); Attendance: 16,846; Referee: Roberto Nunes Morgado |

| Jul 29 Second stage 6 | XV de Piracicaba | 0–0 | São Paulo | Piracicaba |
| | | | | Stadium: Estádio Barão da Serra Negra; Attendance: 14,994; Referee: Sílvio Acácio Silveira |

| Aug 1 Second stage 7 | América | 0–0 | São Paulo | São José do Rio Preto |
| | | | | Stadium: Estádio Mário Alves de Mendonça; Attendance: 11,246; Referee: Oscar Scolfaro |

| Aug 8 Second stage 8 | São Paulo | 0–1 | Corinthians | São Paulo |
| | | | Ivã 22' | Stadium: Estádio Cícero Pompeu de Toledo (Morumbi); Attendance: 16,876; Referee: José de Assis Aragão |

| Aug 11 Second stage 9 | Ferroviária | 0–1 | São Paulo | Araraquara |
| | | | Terto 28' | Stadium: Estádio Doutor Adhemar de Barros (Fonte Luminosa); Attendance: 2,770; Referee: Dulcídio Wanderley Boschilia |

| Aug 15 Second stage 10 | São Paulo | 0–1 | Palmeiras | São Paulo |
| | | | Ademir da Guia 3' | Stadium: Estádio Cícero Pompeu de Toledo (Morumbi); Attendance: 37,879; Referee: Oscar Scolfaro |

| Aug 21 Second stage 11 | São Paulo | 5–0 | Noroeste | São Paulo |
| | Serginho 6', 20', 48'; Pedro Rocha 70'; Mickey 80' | | | Stadium: Estádio Cícero Pompeu de Toledo (Morumbi); Attendance: 938; Referee: Márcio Sales |

==== Record ====
| Final Position | Points | Matches | Wins | Draws | Losses | Goals For | Goals Away | Win% |
|---|---|---|---|---|---|---|---|---|
| 7th | 34 | 28 | 12 | 10 | 6 | 39 | 18 | 60% |

=== Campeonato Brasileiro ===
| Aug 29 First stage 1 | Coritiba | 0–2 | São Paulo | Curitiba |
| | | | Serginho 10'; Mickey 79' | Stadium: Estádio Belfort Duarte; Attendance: 17,982; Referee: Aírton de Morais |

| Sep 1 First stage 2 | Londrina | 0–0 | São Paulo | Londrina |
| | | | | Stadium: Estádio Jacy Scaff (do Café); Attendance: 28,319; Referee: José Marçal Filho |

| Sep 4 First stage 3 | São Paulo | 0–0 | Portuguesa | São Paulo |
| | | | | Stadium: Estádio Cícero Pompeu de Toledo (Morumbi); Attendance: 7,917; Referee: Dulcídio Wanderley Boschilia |

| Sep 8 First stage 4 | Confiança | 1–1 | São Paulo | Aracaju |
| | Lourival 86' | | Mauro 59' | Stadium: Estádio Lourival Baptista (Batistão); Attendance: 21,563; Referee: Valquir Pimentel |

| Sep 12 First stage 5 | Botafogo-SP | 2–0 | São Paulo | Ribeirão Preto |
| | Sócrates 29'; Arlindo 40' | | | Stadium: Estádio Santa Cruz; Attendance: 24,407; Referee: Roberto Nunes Morgado |

| Sep 15 First stage 6 | São Paulo | 0–2 | Atlético Paranaense | São Paulo |
| | | | Tião 72'; Rota 84' | Stadium: Estádio Cícero Pompeu de Toledo (Morumbi); Attendance: 894; Referee: Luís Carlos Félix |

| Sep 18 First stage 7 | São Paulo | 4–0 | Uberaba | São Paulo |
| | Mickey 10', 36'; Terto 15'; Silva 66' | | | Stadium: Estádio Cícero Pompeu de Toledo (Morumbi); Attendance: 7,078; Referee: José Menaden |

| Oct 3 First stage 8 | São Paulo | 1–0 | Cruzeiro | São Paulo |
| | Ademir 85' | | | Stadium: Estádio Cícero Pompeu de Toledo (Morumbi); Attendance: 59,423; Referee: Arnaldo César Coelho |

| Oct 9 Second stage 1 | America-RJ | 1–1 | São Paulo | Rio de Janeiro |
| | Arlindo 65' (o.g.) | | Mickey 66' | Stadium: Estádio Jornalista Mário Filho (Maracanã); Attendance: 4,836; Referee: José Vinhas |

| Oct 14 Second stage 2 | São Paulo | 0–1 | Guarani | São Paulo |
| | | | André 35' | Stadium: Estádio Cícero Pompeu de Toledo (Morumbi); Attendance: 11,167; Referee: Arnaldo César Coelho |

| Oct 17 Second stage 3 | São Paulo | 1–2 | Palmeiras | São Paulo |
| | Ademir da Guia 10' (o.g.) | | Nélson 36' (o.g.); Edu 58' | Stadium: Estádio Cícero Pompeu de Toledo (Morumbi); Attendance: 28,060; Referee: José Roberto Wright |

| Oct 20 Second stage 4 | Vitória | 2–4 | São Paulo | Salvador |
| | Júlio 15'; Fischer 89' | | Mickey 1'; Mauro 63'; Muricy 66'; Serginho 83' | Stadium: Estádio Octávio Mangabeira (Fonte Nova); Attendance: 4,427; Referee: Agomar Martins |

| Oct 24 Second stage 5 | São Paulo | 1–2 | Flamengo | São Paulo |
| | Ademir 88' | | Zico 61', 63' | Stadium: Estádio Cícero Pompeu de Toledo (Morumbi); Attendance: 11,662; Referee: Salmir Mendes |

==== Record ====
| Final Position | Points | Matches | Wins | Draws | Losses | Goals For | Goals Away | Win% |
|---|---|---|---|---|---|---|---|---|
| 25th | 15 | 13 | 4 | 4 | 5 | 15 | 13 | 33% |
