= 1974 São Paulo FC season =

São Paulo
1974 season
- Chairman: Henri Couri Aidar
- Manager: José Poy
- Campeonato Brasileiro: Second stage
- Copa Libertadores: Runners-up
- Campeonato Paulista: Second stage
- Top goalscorer: League: Serginho (9); All: Mirandinha (16)

The 1974 football season was São Paulo's 45th season since club's existence.

== Statistics ==
=== Scorers ===
Position	Nation	Playing position	Name	Campeonato Brasileiro	Copa Libertadores	Campeonato Paulista	Others	Total
1	(Brazil)	FW	Mirandinha	5	4	7	0	16
2	(Uruguay)	MF	Pedro Rocha	1	7	6	1	15
=	(Brazil)	FW	Serginho	9	0	5	1	15
3	(Brazil)	FW	Terto	1	7	4	0	12
4	(Brazil)	FW	Mauro	0	1	2	2	5
5	(Brazil)	FW	Piau	1	2	1	0	4
=	(Brazil)	MF	Zé Carlos	2	1	1	0	4
6	(Brazil)	MF	Chicão	2	1	0	0	3
7	(Brazil)	MF	Silva	0	1	1	0	2
8	(Brazil)	MF	Ademir	1	0	0	0	1
=	(Brazil)	FW	Everaldo	1	0	0	0	1
=	(Brazil)	FW	Jésum	1	0	0	0	1
=	(Brazil)	DF	Nélson	0	1	0	0	1
			Own goals	1	0	1	0	2
			Total	25	25	28	9	87

=== Overall ===
Games played	67 (26 Campeonato Paulista, 13 Copa Libertadores, 24 Campeonato Brasileiro, 4 Friendly match)
Games won	31 (12 Campeonato Paulista, 8 Copa Libertadores, 8 Campeonato Brasileiro, 3 Friendly match)
Games drawn	27 (10 Campeonato Paulista, 3 Copa Libertadores, 13 Campeonato Brasileiro, 1 Friendly match)
Games lost	9 (4 Campeonato Paulista, 2 Copa Libertadores, 3 Campeonato Brasileiro, 0 Friendly match)
Goals scored	87
Goals conceded	42
Goal difference	+45
Best result	5–0 (H) v Jorge Wilstermann - Copa Libertadores - 1974.05.08
Worst result	0–3 (A) v Saad - Campeonato Paulista - 1974.09.21
Most appearances	
Top scorer	Mirandinha (16)

Source: São Paulo FC

== Friendlies ==
May 11 Trofeo Dr. Cyro Ciambruno	Uruguay	0–1	(Brazil) São Paulo	Montevideo
			Pedro Rocha 48'	Stadium: Estadio Centenario; Attendance: 70.000; Referee: (Uruguay) Hector Borra

Jul 28 National	Umuarama	1–1	São Paulo	Umuarama
	Silva 80'		Serginho 65'	Referee: José Alcioni Cordeiro

Aug 18 National	XV de Piracicaba	1–2	São Paulo	Piracicaba
	Beneti 20'		Mauro 12', 58'	Stadium: Estádio Barão da Serra Negra; Referee: Mílton Jorge

Nov 27 National	União Mogi	1–5	São Paulo	Mogi das Cruzes

== Official competitions ==
=== Campeonato Brasileiro ===
Mar 10 First stage 1	Nacional-AM	0–1	São Paulo	Manaus
			Ademir 85'	Stadium: Estádio Vivaldo Lima (Vivaldão); Referee: José Luís Barreto

Mar 13 First stage 2	Rio Negro	2–4	São Paulo	Manaus
	Alberi 43'; Jorge Demolidor 71'		Serginho 38', 60', 82'; Piau 88'	Stadium: Estádio Vivaldo Lima (Vivaldão); Referee: Arnaldo César Coelho

Mar 16 First stage 3	São Paulo	1–1	Guarani	São Paulo
	Pedro Rocha 78'		Darci 69'	Stadium: Estádio Cícero Pompeu de Toledo (Morumbi); Attendance: 7,297; Referee: Armando Marques

Mar 20 First stage 4	São Paulo	1–1	Náutico	São Paulo
	Everaldo 11'		Dedéu 78'	Stadium: Estádio Cícero Pompeu de Toledo (Morumbi); Attendance: 937; Referee: Agomar Martins

Mar 23 First stage 5	Santa Cruz	0–0	São Paulo	Recife
				Stadium: Estádio José do Rego Maciel (Arruda); Attendance: 13,456; Referee: Arnaldo César Coelho

Apr 3 First stage 6	São Paulo	2–0	Ceará	São Paulo
	Jésum 42'; Odélio 56' (o.g.)			Stadium: Estádio Cícero Pompeu de Toledo (Morumbi); Attendance: 2,837; Referee: Agomar Martins

Apr 6 First stage 7	Operário	0–2	São Paulo	Campo Grande
			Serginho 78', 86'	Stadium: Estádio Universitário Pedro Pedrossian (Morenão); Referee: José Aldo Pereira

Apr 10 First stage 8	São Paulo	2–1	Sport	São Paulo
	Serginho 12', 74'		Rubens 45'	Stadium: Estádio Cícero Pompeu de Toledo (Morumbi); Attendance: 2,925; Referee: Agomar Martins

Apr 21 First stage 9	CSA	0–0	São Paulo	Maceió
				Stadium: Estádio Rei Pelé; Attendance: 9,074; Referee: Arnaldo César Coelho

Apr 27 First stage 10	São Paulo	0–0	Portuguesa	São Paulo
				Stadium: Estádio Cícero Pompeu de Toledo (Morumbi); Referee: Armando Marques

May 4 First stage 11	América-MG	0–0	São Paulo	Belo Horizonte
				Stadium: Estádio Governador Magalhães Pinto (Mineirão); Attendance: 5,917; Referee: Armando Marques

May 15 First stage 12	São Paulo	1–2	Atlético Mineiro	São Paulo
	Mirandinha 58'		Cláudio 80'; Vanderlei 86'	Stadium: Estádio Cícero Pompeu de Toledo (Morumbi); Referee: Armando Marques

May 18 First stage 13	Fortaleza	1–1	São Paulo	Fortaleza
	Hamilton 5'		Serginho 71'	Stadium: Estádio Plácido Aderaldo Castelo (Castelão); Attendance: 10,583; Referee: Luís Carlos Félix

May 26 First stage 14	Goiás	0–3	São Paulo	Goiânia
			Mirandinha 9', 88'; Serginho 43'	Stadium: Estádio Olímpico Pedro Ludovico; Attendance: 10,162; Referee: Arnaldo César Coelho

May 29 First stage 15	CEUB	1–1	São Paulo	Brasília
	Xiste 38'		Mirandinha 52'	Stadium: Estádio Nacional de Brasília (Mané Garrincha); Attendance: 3,076; Referee: Valquir Pimentel

Jun 2 First stage 16	Santos	1–1	São Paulo	São Paulo
	Brecha 66'		Mirandinha 64'	Stadium: Estádio Cícero Pompeu de Toledo (Morumbi); Attendance: 15,982; Referee: Armando Marques

Jun 9 First stage 17	São Paulo	1–1	Corinthians	São Paulo
	Zé Carlos 49'		Washington 90'	Stadium: Estádio Cícero Pompeu de Toledo (Morumbi); Referee: Dulcídio Wanderley Boschilia

Jun 12 First stage 18	Palmeiras	1–0	São Paulo	São Paulo
	Ronaldo 73'			Stadium: Estádio Municipal Paulo Machado de Carvalho (Pacaembu); Attendance: 5,084; Referee: Oscar Scolfaro

Jun 16 First stage 19	Cruzeiro	0–1	São Paulo	Belo Horizonte
			Zé Carlos 74'	Stadium: Estádio Governador Magalhães Pinto (Mineirão); Attendance: 7,432; Referee: José Aldo Pereira

Jun 30 Second stage 1	Fluminense	0–1	São Paulo	Rio de Janeiro
			Terto 81'	Stadium: Estádio Jornalista Mário Filho (Maracanã); Attendance: 3,157; Referee: Sebastião Rufino

Jul 3 Second stage 2	Goiás	1–1	São Paulo	Goiânia
	Pagheti 49'		Chicão 51'	Stadium: Estádio Olímpico Pedro Ludovico; Attendance: 2,289; Referee: Saul Mendes

Jul 7 Second stage 3	São Paulo	1–1	Portuguesa	São Paulo
	Chicão 39'		Adilton 49'	Stadium: Estádio Cícero Pompeu de Toledo (Morumbi); Attendance: 6,747; Referee: José de Assis Aragão

Jul 13 Second stage 4	São Paulo	0–0	Atlético Paranaense	São Paulo
				Stadium: Estádio Cícero Pompeu de Toledo (Morumbi); Attendance: 10,219; Referee: Sebastião Rufino

Jul 17 Second stage 5	São Paulo	0–1	Internacional	São Paulo
			Carpegiani 88'	Stadium: Estádio Municipal Paulo Machado de Carvalho (Pacaembu); Referee: Valquir Pimentel

==== Record ====
Final Position	Points	Matches	Wins	Draws	Losses	Goals For	Goals Away	Win%
10th	29	24	8	13	3	25	15	60%

=== Copa Libertadores ===
Mar 30 First stage 1	São Paulo (Brazil)	2–0	(Brazil) Palmeiras	São Paulo
	Terto 5', 33'			Stadium: Estádio Cícero Pompeu de Toledo (Morumbi); Attendance: 35,000; Referee: Armando Marques

Apr 14 First stage 2	Jorge Wilstermann (Bolivia)	0–1	(Brazil) São Paulo	Cochabamba
			Terto 1'	Stadium: Estadio Félix Capriles; Attendance: 16,000; Referee: José Romei (Paraguay)

Apr 17 First stage 3	Deportivo Municipal (Bolivia)	1–1	(Brazil) São Paulo	La Paz
	Lladó 22'		Pedro Rocha 51'	Stadium: Estadio Hernando Siles; Attendance: 22,000; Referee: Mário Lira (Chile)

Apr 24 First stage 4	Palmeiras (Brazil)	1–2	(Brazil) São Paulo	São Paulo
	Ronaldo 83'		Chicão 40'; Mauro 71'	Stadium: Estádio Palestra Itália (Parque Antarctica); Attendance: 35,000; Referee: Oscar Scolfaro

Apr 30 First stage 5	São Paulo (Brazil)	3–3	(Bolivia) Deportivo Municipal	São Paulo
	Nélson 47'; Terto 54'; Pedro Rocha 86'		Lladó 52'; Linares 64', 77'	Stadium: Estádio Cícero Pompeu de Toledo (Morumbi); Attendance: 8,530; Referee: César Orozco (Peru)

May 8 First stage 6	São Paulo (Brazil)	5–0	(Bolivia) Jorge Wilstermann	São Paulo
	Pedro Rocha 11', 22', 85'; Mirandinha 73'; Zé Carlos 83'			Stadium: Estádio Cícero Pompeu de Toledo (Morumbi); Attendance: 16,000; Referee: René Torres (Ecuador)

Sep 8 Second stage 1	Millonarios (Colombia)	0–0	(Brazil) São Paulo	Bogotá
				Stadium: Estadio Nemesio Camacho (El Campín); Attendance: 50,000; Referee: Vicente Lobregat (Venezuela)

Sep 11 Second stage 2	Defensor Lima (Peru)	0–1	(Brazil) São Paulo	Lima
			Mirandinha 84'	Stadium: Estadio Nacional; Attendance: 55,000; Referee: Héctor Ortiz (Paraguay)

Sep 27 Second stage 3	São Paulo (Brazil)	4–0	(Colombia) Millonarios	São Paulo
	Pedro Rocha 18'; Terto 26', 53'; Piau 53'			Stadium: Estádio Municipal Paulo Machado de Carvalho (Pacaembu); Attendance: 25,186; Referee: Roberto Barreiro

Oct 2 Second stage 4	São Paulo (Brazil)	4–0	(Peru) Defensor Lima	São Paulo
	Terto; Piau; Silva; Mirandinha			Stadium: Estádio Municipal Paulo Machado de Carvalho (Pacaembu); Attendance: 5,000; Referee: Arturo Andrés

Oct 12 Finals	São Paulo (Brazil)	2–1	(Argentina) Independiente	São Paulo
	Pedro Rocha 47'; Mirandinha 50'		Saggionaro 29'	Stadium: Estádio Municipal Paulo Machado de Carvalho (Pacaembu); Attendance: 51,436; Referee: Edilson Perez (Peru)

Oct 16 Finals	Independiente (Argentina)	2–0	(Brazil) São Paulo	Avellaneda
	Bocchini 33'; Balbuena 72'			Stadium: Estadio Almirante Cordero; Referee: Ramón Barreto

Oct 19 Finals	Independiente (Argentina)	1–0	(Brazil) São Paulo	Santiago
	Pavoni 27'			Stadium: Estadio Nacional; Attendance: 27,658; Referee: César Orozco (Peru)

==== Record ====
Final Position	Points	Matches	Wins	Draws	Losses	Goals For	Goals Away	Win%
2nd	19	13	8	3	2	25	9	73%

=== Campeonato Paulista ===
Aug 4 First stage 1	São Paulo	1–0	Comercial	São Paulo
	Pedro Rocha 15'			Stadium: Estádio Municipal Paulo Machado de Carvalho (Pacaembu); Attendance: 9,624; Referee: José Faville Neto

Aug 7 First stage 2	São Paulo	1–0	Noroeste	São Paulo
	Mirandinha 5'			Stadium: Estádio Municipal Paulo Machado de Carvalho (Pacaembu); Attendance: 5,992; Referee: Dulcídio Wanderley Boschilia

Aug 11 First stage 3	Botafogo	1–0	São Paulo	Ribeirão Preto
	Sócrates 76'			Stadium: Estádio Santa Cruz; Attendance: 14,040; Referee: Armando Marques

Aug 25 First stage 4	Portuguesa	2–2	São Paulo	São Paulo
	Wilsinho 72'; Enéas 75'		Mirandinha 4', 49'	Stadium: Estádio Municipal Paulo Machado de Carvalho (Pacaembu); Attendance: 22,256; Referee: José de Assis Aragão

Aug 28 First stage 5	São Paulo	1–0	São Bento	São Paulo
	Mauro 17'			Stadium: Estádio Municipal Paulo Machado de Carvalho (Pacaembu); Attendance: 4,737; Referee: Alcirio Agostinho

Aug 31 First stage 6	Juventus	0–0	São Paulo	São Paulo
				Stadium: Estádio Municipal Paulo Machado de Carvalho (Pacaembu); Attendance: 8,120; Referee: Armando Marques

Sep 3 First stage 7	São Paulo	1–0	América	São Paulo
	Mirandinha 76'			Stadium: Estádio Municipal Paulo Machado de Carvalho (Pacaembu); Attendance: 3,302; Referee: Roberto Nunes Morgado

Sep 15 First stage 8	São Paulo	1–1	Santos	São Paulo
	Piau 66'		Cláudio Adão 45'	Stadium: Estádio Municipal Paulo Machado de Carvalho (Pacaembu); Attendance: 40,351; Referee: Armando Marques

Sep 18 First stage 9	Guarani	1–1	São Paulo	Campinas
	Odair 64'		Pedro Rocha 70'	Stadium: Estádio Brinco de Ouro da Princesa; Referee: Dulcídio Wanderley Boschilia

Sep 21 First stage 10	Saad	3–0	São Paulo	São Paulo
	Vagner 43'; Alcindo 55'; Luiz 83'			Stadium: Estádio Palestra Itália (Parque Antarctica); Attendance: 7,110; Referee: Silvio Silveira

Sep 24 First stage 11	São Paulo	0–0	Ponte Preta	São Paulo
				Stadium: Estádio Municipal Paulo Machado de Carvalho (Pacaembu); Attendance: 6,171; Referee: Roberto Nunes Morgado

Oct 6 First stage 12	Palmeiras	1–1	São Paulo	São Paulo
	Levinha 34'		Mauro 76'	Stadium: Estádio Municipal Paulo Machado de Carvalho (Pacaembu); Attendance: 14,015; Referee: José Favilli

Oct 9 First stage 13	São Paulo	0–1	Corinthians	São Paulo
			Zé Roberto 90'	Stadium: Estádio Municipal Paulo Machado de Carvalho (Pacaembu); Attendance: 52,739; Referee: Armando Marques

Oct 27 Second stage 1	São Paulo	1–1	Santos	São Paulo
	Zé Carlos 26'		Carlos Alberto 23'	Stadium: Estádio Municipal Paulo Machado de Carvalho (Pacaembu); Referee: José de Assis Aragão

Oct 31 Second stage 2	São Paulo	0–0	Saad	São Paulo
				Stadium: Estádio Palestra Itália (Parque Antarctica); Attendance: 2,916; Referee: Roberto Nunes Morgado

Nov 3 Second stage 3	Comercial	0–0	São Paulo	Ribeirão Preto
				Stadium: Estádio Dr. Francisco de Palma Travassos; Attendance: 5,953; Referee: Dulcídio Wanderley Boschilia

Nov 6 Second stage 4	Noroeste	0–2	São Paulo	Bauru
			Silva 23'; Pedro Rocha 77'	Stadium: Estádio Dr. Alfredo de Castilho; Attendance: 12,152; Referee: Armando Marques

Nov 10 Second stage 5	São Paulo	1–2	Palmeiras	São Paulo
	Terto 85'		Ademir da Guia 39'; Levinha 60'	Stadium: Estádio Municipal Paulo Machado de Carvalho (Pacaembu); Attendance: 29,681; Referee: Dulcídio Wanderley Boschilia

Nov 13 Second stage 6	São Bento	0–2	São Paulo	Sorocaba
			Terto 9'; Pedro Rocha 73'	Stadium: Estádio Humberto Reale; Referee: Romualdo Arppi Filho

Nov 20 Second stage 7	São Paulo	2–0	Guarani	São Paulo
	Mirandinha 13', 66'			Stadium: Estádio Municipal Paulo Machado de Carvalho (Pacaembu); Attendance: 9,357; Referee: Armando Marques

Nov 24 Second stage 8	América	0–3	São Paulo	São José do Rio Preto
			Mirandinha 53'; Serginho 82', 88'	Stadium: Estádio Mário Alves Mendonça; Attendance: 8,673; Referee: Roberto Nunes Morgado

Dec 1 Second stage 9	São Paulo	3–0	Corinthians	São Paulo
	Baldochi 38' (o.g.); Serginho 54'; Terto 70'			Stadium: Estádio Municipal Paulo Machado de Carvalho (Pacaembu); Attendance: 25,999; Referee: Armando Marques

Dec 4 Second stage 10	São Paulo	1–0	Botafogo	São Paulo
	Serginho 25'			Stadium: Estádio Municipal Paulo Machado de Carvalho (Pacaembu); Attendance: 2,925; Referee: Roberto Nunes Morgado

Dec 8 Second stage 11	Ponte Preta	1–2	São Paulo	Campinas
	Valtinho 25'		Terto 57'; Pedro Rocha 59'	Stadium: Estádio Moisés Lucarelli; Referee: Armando Marques

Dec 11 Second stage 12	São Paulo	0–0	Portuguesa	São Paulo
				Stadium: Estádio Municipal Paulo Machado de Carvalho (Pacaembu); Attendance: 13,466; Referee: Roberto Nunes Morgado

Dec 15 Second stage 13	São Paulo	2–1	Juventus	São Paulo
	Serginho 20'; Pedro Rocha 64'		Vanderlei 65'	Stadium: Estádio Municipal Paulo Machado de Carvalho (Pacaembu); Attendance: 7,717; Referee: Armando Marques

==== Record ====
Final Position	Points	Matches	Wins	Draws	Losses	Goals For	Goals Away	Win%
4th	34	26	12	10	4	28	15	65%
