= Paranhos =

Paranhos may refer to:

== Places ==
- Paranhos (Amares), a parish (freguesia) in Amares municipality
- Paranhos (Mato Grosso do Sul)
- Paranhos (Porto)

== People ==
- José Paranhos, Viscount of Rio Branco
- His son, José Paranhos, Baron of Rio Branco
- Marivaldo Paranhos (born 1947), Brazilian footballer
