= Vicente de la Mata =

Vicente de la Mata may refer to:

- Vicente de la Mata (footballer, born 1918) (1918–1980), Argentine footballer and manager
- Vicente de la Mata (footballer, born 1944) (1944–2024), Argentine footballer, son of the above
