= 2015 Vissel Kobe season =

Vissel Kobe
2015 season
- Manager: Nelsinho
- Stadium: Noevir Stadium Kobe
- J1 League: 12th
Home colours	Away colours

2015 Vissel Kobe season.

== J1 League ==
=== League table ===
Pos	Team	Pld	W	D	L	GF	GA	GD	Pts
11	Sagan Tosu	34	9	13	12	37	54	−17	40
12	Vissel Kobe	34	10	8	16	44	49	−5	38
13	Ventforet Kofu	34	10	7	17	26	43	−17	37

Updated to match(es) played on 28 November 2015. Source: Meiji Yasuda J1 League Standings
Rules for classification: 1) Points; 2) Goal difference; 3) Goals scored

=== Match details ===
J1 League match details
Match	Date	Team	Score	Team	Venue	Attendance
1-1	2015.03.07	Vissel Kobe	0-1	Kashiwa Reysol	Noevir Stadium Kobe	24,027
1-2	2015.03.14	Kawasaki Frontale	2-2	Vissel Kobe	Kawasaki Todoroki Stadium	21,689
1-3	2015.03.22	Vissel Kobe	0-2	FC Tokyo	Noevir Stadium Kobe	21,218
1-4	2015.04.04	Sanfrecce Hiroshima	0-1	Vissel Kobe	Edion Stadium Hiroshima	11,577
1-5	2015.04.12	Vissel Kobe	4-1	Ventforet Kofu	Noevir Stadium Kobe	15,494
1-6	2015.04.18	Albirex Niigata	2-2	Vissel Kobe	Denka Big Swan Stadium	16,068
1-7	2015.04.25	Kashima Antlers	1-2	Vissel Kobe	Kashima Soccer Stadium	12,275
1-8	2015.04.29	Vissel Kobe	0-1	Nagoya Grampus	Noevir Stadium Kobe	17,052
1-9	2015.05.02	Sagan Tosu	1-1	Vissel Kobe	Best Amenity Stadium	20,792
1-10	2015.05.06	Shonan Bellmare	1-1	Vissel Kobe	Shonan BMW Stadium Hiratsuka	9,157
1-11	2015.05.10	Vissel Kobe	1-2	Shimizu S-Pulse	Noevir Stadium Kobe	14,397
1-12	2015.05.16	Matsumoto Yamaga FC	2-0	Vissel Kobe	Matsumotodaira Park Stadium	11,743
1-13	2015.05.23	Montedio Yamagata	0-1	Vissel Kobe	ND Soft Stadium Yamagata	7,894
1-14	2015.05.30	Vissel Kobe	0-1	Vegalta Sendai	Noevir Stadium Kobe	14,906
1-15	2015.06.07	Gamba Osaka	0-0	Vissel Kobe	Expo '70 Commemorative Stadium	18,437
1-16	2015.06.20	Vissel Kobe	1-1	Urawa Reds	Noevir Stadium Kobe	18,143
1-17	2015.06.27	Vissel Kobe	1-1	Yokohama F. Marinos	Noevir Stadium Kobe	22,332
2-1	2015.07.11	Shimizu S-Pulse	0-5	Vissel Kobe	IAI Stadium Nihondaira	14,037
2-2	2015.07.15	Vissel Kobe	1-1	Shonan Bellmare	Noevir Stadium Kobe	7,696
2-3	2015.07.19	Vegalta Sendai	1-2	Vissel Kobe	Yurtec Stadium Sendai	12,488
2-4	2015.07.25	Vissel Kobe	1-2	Gamba Osaka	Noevir Stadium Kobe	20,679
2-5	2015.07.29	Vissel Kobe	0-4	Sanfrecce Hiroshima	Noevir Stadium Kobe	9,538
2-6	2015.08.12	Kashiwa Reysol	2-0	Vissel Kobe	Hitachi Kashiwa Stadium	12,383
2-7	2015.08.16	Vissel Kobe	2-0	Kawasaki Frontale	Noevir Stadium Kobe	15,451
2-8	2015.08.22	Ventforet Kofu	1-0	Vissel Kobe	Yamanashi Chuo Bank Stadium	9,113
2-9	2015.08.29	Vissel Kobe	7-1	Sagan Tosu	Kobe Universiade Memorial Stadium	14,637
2-10	2015.09.12	FC Tokyo	3-0	Vissel Kobe	Ajinomoto Stadium	22,328
2-11	2015.09.19	Vissel Kobe	1-2	Albirex Niigata	Kobe Universiade Memorial Stadium	14,471
2-12	2015.09.26	Nagoya Grampus	2-0	Vissel Kobe	Paloma Mizuho Stadium	11,570
2-13	2015.10.03	Vissel Kobe	0-2	Kashima Antlers	Noevir Stadium Kobe	16,871
2-14	2015.10.17	Yokohama F. Marinos	2-1	Vissel Kobe	Nissan Stadium	22,598
2-15	2015.10.24	Vissel Kobe	3-1	Montedio Yamagata	Noevir Stadium Kobe	11,508
2-16	2015.11.07	Vissel Kobe	2-1	Matsumoto Yamaga FC	Noevir Stadium Kobe	18,092
2-17	2015.11.22	Urawa Reds	5-2	Vissel Kobe	Saitama Stadium 2002	52,133
