= Gilberto Sorriso =

Brazilian footballer

Personal information
- Full name: Gilberto Ferreira da Silva
- Date of birth: 18 September 1951 (age 75)
- Place of birth: São Paulo, Brazil
- Height: 1.72 m (5 ft 8 in)
- Position: Left-back

Youth career
- 1968–1970: São Paulo

Senior career*
Years	Team	Apps	(Gls)
1970–1977	São Paulo	434	(7)
1977–1986	Santos	308	(10)
1980	→ Goiás (loan)		
1980	→ Noroeste (loan)		
1985	→ Santo André (loan)		
1987–1989	Portuguesa Santista		
- * Club domestic league appearances and goals as of 17 August 2023

Gilberto Ferreira da Silva (born 18 September 1951), or better known as Gilberto Sorriso, is a former football player, who played as a left back.

== Honours ==
São Paulo

- Campeonato Paulista: 1970, 1971, 1975

Santos

- Campeonato Paulista: 1978, 1984
