= Roberto Ferreiro =

Argentine footballer and manager

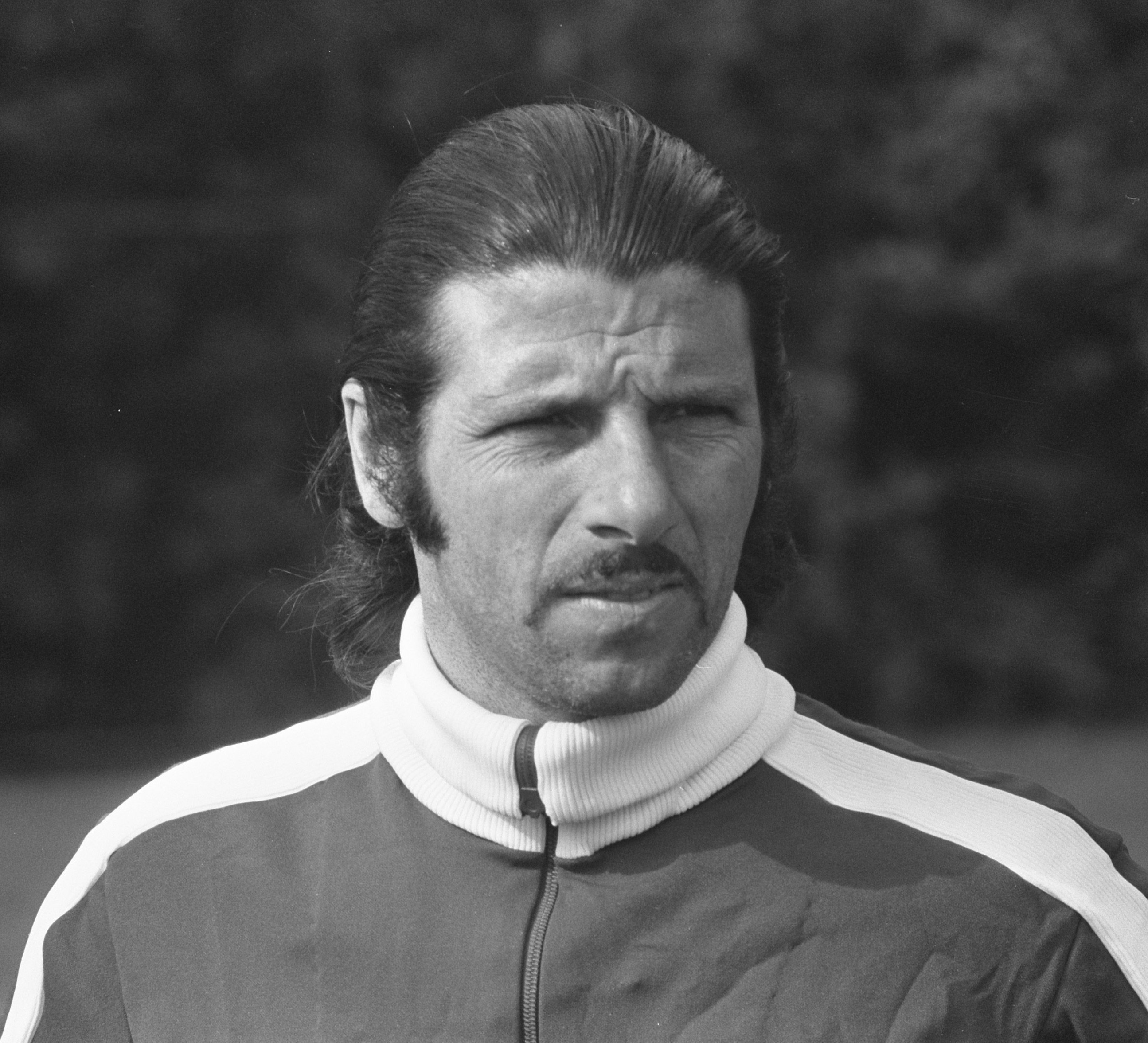
- Ferreiro in 1972.

Personal information
- Full name: Roberto Oscar Ferreiro
- Date of birth: 25 April 1935
- Place of birth: Avellaneda, Argentina
- Date of death: 20 April 2017 (aged 81)
- Height: 1.76 m (5 ft 9 1/2 in)
- Position: Right-back

Senior career*
Years	Team	Apps	(Gls)
1958–1968	Independiente	241	(0)
1968–1970	River Plate	86	(0)
Total		327	(0)

International career
1962–1966	Argentina	18	(0)

Managerial career
- 1973–1974: Independiente
- * Club domestic league appearances and goals

Roberto Oscar Ferreiro (25 April 1935 – 20 April 2017) was an Argentine professional football player and manager who played as a defender.

== Playing career ==
Ferreiro played club football for Independiente and River Plate.

He earned 18 caps for the Argentina national team between 1962 and 1966.

== Managerial career ==
After retiring as a player Ferreiro went on to become a manager, taking charge at Independiente in the 1970s. He led the team to a number of championships, including the 1973 Intercontinental Cup and Copa Libertadores 1974.

== Later life and death ==
He died on 20 April 2017, at the age of 81.

== Honours ==
=== Player ===
Independiente

- Copa Libertadores: 1964, 1965
- Argentine Primera División: 1960, 1963, 1967

Argentina

- Copa América third-place: 1963

=== Manager ===
Nueva Chicago

- Primera B Metropolitana: 1981

Villa Dalmine

- Primera B Metropolitana: 1989

Independiente

- Intercontinental Cup: 1973
- Copa Libertadores: 1974
- Copa Interamericana: 1974
