= Arlindo (footballer, born 1948) =

Brazilian footballer

Personal information
- Full name: Arlindo Galvão
- Date of birth: 8 May 1948 (age 78)
- Place of birth: Marília, Brazil
- Position: Centre-back

Senior career*
| Years | Team | Apps | (Gls) |
| 1968–1977 | São Paulo | 406 | (4) |
| 1970 | → Náutico (loan) | | |
| 1978 | São Bento | | |
- * Club domestic league appearances and goals as of 17 August 2023

Arlindo Galvão (born 8 May 1948), simply known as Arlindo, is a former football player, who played as a centre-back.

== Honours ==
São Paulo

- Campeonato Paulista: 1971, 1975
