= Rui Rei =

Brazilian footballer (born 1953)

Personal information
- Full name: Rui Rei de Araújo
- Date of birth: 17 January 1953 (age 73)
- Place of birth: Rio de Janeiro, Brazil
- Position: Forward

Senior career*
Years	Team	Apps	(Gls)
1970–1974	Flamengo	20	(6)
1975	→ Ponte Preta (loan)		
1975–1976	Portuguesa	45	(17)
1977	Ponte Preta		
1978–1981	Corinthians	78	(21)
1979	→ America-RJ (loan)		
1980	→ Botafogo (loan)		
1981	Rio Negro		
1982	Deportes Tolima		
1982	Taubaté		
1983	São Cristóvão		
1983–1986	Portuguesa-RJ		
1987–1988	Sestao River		
1989	Nova Cidade		
- * Club domestic league appearances and goals as of 5 February 2024

Rui Rei de Araújo (born 17 January 1953), is a Brazilian former professional footballer who played as a forward.

== Career ==
Rui Rei emerged in football in a community project in the Cruzada de São Sebastião favela. Taken to Flamengo, he was part of the club's squad from 1970 to 1974, when he was part of the state champion squad. He played for Portuguesa subsequently, making 45 appearances and scoring 17 goals.

In 1977 he played for AA Ponte Preta and was one of the highlights of the team's campaign that reached the state final that year, even scoring the winning goal for Ponte Preta over Corinthians in the second leg of the final, which would force an extra match.

However, in the third game of the final, he was sent off by referee Dulcídio Wanderley Boschilla right at 16th minute of the match, after offended him. Rui Rei was later accused of having forced the expulsion, as a few days after the finals, won by Corinthians, putting an end to the club's title drought, Rui Rei was announced as a reinforcement for the club. With Corinthians, he would go on to win the state title in 1979.

== Honours ==
Flamengo

- Campeonato Carioca: 1974

Corinthians

- Campeonato Paulista: 1979
