= Tatá (footballer, born 1947) =

Brazilian footballer

Personal information
- Full name: Irineu Finavaro
- Date of birth: 24 July 1947 (age 79)
- Place of birth: Londrina, Brazil
- Height: 1.74 m (5 ft 9 in)
- Position: Forward

Youth career
- Londrina

Senior career*
Years	Team	Apps	(Gls)
1968–1969	Londrina		
1969–1977	Portuguesa	386	(96)
1972	→ Atlético Mineiro (loan)	8	(1)
1977–1980	Juventus-SP		
1980–1981	Londrina		
- * Club domestic league appearances and goals as of 1 February 2024

Irineu Finavaro (born 24 July 1947), better known as Tatá, is a Brazilian former professional footballer who played as a forward.

== Career ==
Center forward, his biggest trademark was his mustache, forming attacking partnerships with players like Basílio, Cabinho and Enéas. It was part of the controversial 1973 state final, where the title was shared between Santos and Portuguesa. He began and ended his career at Londrina, as a substitute in winning the 1981 Campeonato Paranaense.

== Honours ==
Portuguesa

- Campeonato Paulista: 1973

Londrina

- Campeonato Paranaense: 1981
