= Vicente de la Mata (footballer, born 1944) =

Argentine footballer (1944–2024)

Personal information
- Full name: Vicente de la Mata (H)
- Date of birth: 2 July 1944
- Place of birth: Rosario, Santa Fe Province, Argentina
- Date of death: 21 November 2024 (aged 80)
- Position: Midfielder

Senior career*
Years	Team	Apps	(Gls)
1961–1970	Independiente	97	(8)
1970–1971	Necaxa		
1971–1976	Veracruz		
1976–1977	O'Higgins		
1978–1979	Argentino de Quilmes	8	(2)

International career
1965–1966	Argentina	6	(0)
- * Club domestic league appearances and goals

Vicente de la Mata (2 July 1944 – 21 November 2024) was an Argentine footballer. A midfielder, he played most of his club career for Independiente and played for the Argentina national team between 1965 and 1966.

== Biography ==
Born in Rosario, his father, Vicente, was an Argentine international footballer, one of their greatest during the 1940s.

De la Mata emerged from the youth team of Club Atlético Independiente. He won three Primera División Argentina titles in nine seasons with Independiente. He also helped Independiente win the Copa Libertadores twice.

In 1970, he moved abroad to play for Club Necaxa in the Primera División de México. He played one season with Necaxa, and then joined Deportivo Veracruz for five seasons. At the end of his career, he passed through Chile and then played one season in the Primera B Metropolitana with Argentino de Quilmes.

De la Mata made six appearances for the Argentina national team, including one 1966 FIFA World Cup qualifier.

He died on 21 November 2024, at the age of 80.
