= Marivaldo Paranhos =

Brazilian footballer

Paranhos
Personal information
- Full name: Marivaldo Paranhos Prado
- Date of birth: 3 December 1947 (age 78)
- Place of birth: Maceió, Brazil
- Position: Defender

Youth career
- CSA

Senior career*
Years	Team	Apps	(Gls)
1963–1972	CSA		
1973–1977	São Paulo	238	(0)
1977–1979	Santa Cruz		
1979–1980	Colorado-PR		
1980–1981	CSA		
- * Club domestic league appearances and goals as of 1 September 2023

Marivaldo Paranhos Prado (born 3 December 1947), simply known as Paranhos, is a Brazilian former professional footballer who played as a defender.

== Career ==
Paranhos began his career at CSA where he won four titles in the Campeonato Alagoano. At São Paulo FC, he stood out for the violence in his style of play. He also participated in the campaign for the only title in Colorado history. Returned to the CSA in 1980 and was champion again for a last time.

== Honours ==
CSA

- Campeonato Alagoano: 1965, 1966, 1967, 1968, 1971, 1980

São Paulo

- Campeonato Paulista: 1975

Colorado

- Campeonato Paranaense: 1980
