= Ziquita =

Brazilian footballer (born 1953)

Personal information
- Full name: Gilberto de Souza Costa
- Date of birth: 5 February 1953 (age 73)
- Place of birth: Caratinga, Minas Gerais, Brazil
- Position: Forward

Senior career*
Years	Team	Apps	(Gls)
1973–1975	Democrata		
1975–1976	Comercial-SP		
1976	Atlético Mineiro	5	(0)
1976	Marília		
1977	Comercial-SP		(6)
1977–1978	Guarani		
1978	Comercial-SP	14	(2)
1978–1979	Athletico Paranaense		
1979	Noroeste		(1)
1980	Coquimbo Unido	23	(4)
1981	Democrata		
1982	Blumenau	4	(0)
1984	Sobradinho		
- * Club domestic league appearances and goals

Gilberto de Souza Costa (born 5 February 1953), sportingly known as Ziquita, is a Brazilian former professional footballer who played as a forward. Besides Brazil, he played in Chile.

== Career ==
Ziquita started his professional career with Democrata in 1973, became the top goalscorer of the 1975 Taça Minas Gerais and switched to Comercial-SP in the same year.

The next years, Ziquita continued in his homeland with Atlético Mineiro (1976), Comercial (1977), Guarani (1977–78), Comercial (1978), Athletico Paranaense (1978–79) and Noroeste (1979).

In 1977, Ziquita also represented the Seleção Paulista do Interior.

A historical player of Athletico Paranaense, he scored all goals in the 4–4 draw against the classic rival, Colorado, on 5 November 1978.

In 1980, Ziquita moved abroad and played for Coquimbo Unido in the Chilean Primera División.

Back in Brazil, Ziquita played for Democrata, Blumenau and Sobradinho, his last club in 1984.

== Personal life ==
In March 2018, Ziquita suffered a stroke.
