= São Sebastião da Grama =

- Municipality
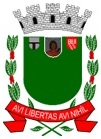
- Flag Coat of arms

- Location in São Paulo state

- Location in Brazil
- Coordinates: 21°42′38″S 46°49′15″W
- Country: Brazil
- Region: Southeast
- State: São Paulo

Area
  - Total: 252 km^{2} (97 sq mi)

Population (2020)
  - Total: 12,159
  - Density: 48.2/km^{2} (125/sq mi)
- Time zone: UTC−3 (BRT)

São Sebastião da Grama is a municipality in the state of São Paulo in Brazil. The population in 2020 was estimated as 12,159 in an area of 252 square kilometres (97 sq mi). The elevation is 945 metres (3,100 ft).

== Media ==
In telecommunications, the city was served by Telecomunicações de São Paulo. In July 1998, this company was acquired by Telefónica, which adopted the Vivo brand in 2012. The company is currently an operator of cell phones, fixed lines, internet (fiber optics/4G) and television (satellite and cable).

== See also ==
- List of municipalities in São Paulo
