= Arlindo Fazolin =

Brazilian footballer

Personal information
- Full name: Arlindo Fazolin
- Date of birth: 19 November 1949 (age 76)
- Place of birth: Santo André, Brazil
- Position: Forward

Senior career*
| Years | Team | Apps | (Gls) |
| 1968–1974 | Saad | | |
| 1975 | Corinthians | 30 | (6) |
| 1975–1976 | São Paulo | 21 | (4) |
| 1976–1978 | Botafogo-SP | | |
| 1979 | Uberlândia | | |
| 1980 | São José-SP | | |
| 1980–1981 | Apucarana | | |
| 1981–1982 | Atlético Paranaense | | |
| 1982 | Mogi Mirim | | |
| 1983–1984 | Amparo | | |
| 1985 | São Caetano EC | | |
| 1985 | Saad | | |
| 1986 | Descalvadense | | |
- * Club domestic league appearances and goals as of 27 October 2023

Arlindo Fazolin (born 19 November 1949) is a Brazilian former professional footballer who played as a forward.

== Career ==
Striker revealed by Saad EC, had spells at Corinthians and São Paulo. He stood out for being a good corner taker. At Botafogo, he was part of the squad that won the Taça Cidade de São Paulo, the first round of the 1977 Campeonato Paulista. He ended his career in 1986, with the Descalvadense third division title.

== Honours ==
Botafogo-SP

- Taça Cidade de São Paulo: 1977

Descavaldense

- Campeonato Paulista Série A3: 1986
