= 1978 Campeonato Paulista =

Campeonato Paulista – Série A1
- Season: 1978
- Champions: Santos
- Relegated: Paulista; Portuguesa Santista
- Copa Brasil: Francana; São Bento; Comercial; XV de Jaú; XV de Piracicaba
- Matches: 444
- Goals: 978 (2.2 per match)
- Top goalscorer: Juary (Santos) – 29 goals
- Biggest home win: Santos 5-0 Comercial (August 30, 1978); São Bento 5-0 Comercial (February 18, 1979)
- Biggest away win: Francana 0-4 Corinthians (March 25, 1979); Portuguesa 0-4 São Paulo (May 26, 1979)
- Highest scoring: Juventus 6-2 Portuguesa Santista (October 10, 1978); Palmeiras 5-3 Portuguesa (October 29, 1978); Marília 4-4 Ponte Preta (February 24, 1979)

The 1978 Campeonato Paulista da Divisão Especial de Futebol Profissional was the 77th season of São Paulo's top professional football league. Santos won the championship by the 14th time. Juary from Santos was the top scorer with 29 goals. Paulista and Portuguesa Santista were relegated.

== Championship ==
The first phase of the championship was divided into two rounds, in which the twenty teams of the championship were divided into four groups of five teams, with each team playing once against all other teams, and the two best teams of each group passing to the Quarterfinals. The finalists of each round qualified to the Third round, along with the four best teams in the aggregate table, and the two teams with the best revenue among the eliminated. the team with the fewest points out of all the twenty was relegated, while the team with the second-fewest points would dispute a playoff against the runner-up of the Second level.

In the Third round, the ten remaining teams would be divided into two groups of five, each team playing once against the teams of its own group and the other group, and the two best teams of each group qualifying to the Semifinals.

=== First round ===
==== Group A ====
| Pos | Team | Pld | W | D | L | GF | GA | GD | Pts | Qualification or relegation |
|---|---|---|---|---|---|---|---|---|---|---|
| 1 | Ponte Preta | 19 | 8 | 8 | 3 | 17 | 10 | +7 | 24 | Qualified |
| 2 | Santos | 19 | 7 | 9 | 3 | 17 | 15 | +2 | 23 | Qualified |
| 3 | Paulista | 19 | 4 | 9 | 6 | 12 | 15 | −3 | 17 | |
| 4 | Noroeste | 19 | 6 | 4 | 9 | 12 | 22 | −10 | 16 | |
| 5 | Portuguesa Santista | 19 | 2 | 3 | 14 | 11 | 34 | −23 | 7 | |

Updated to match(es) played on November 8, 1978. Source: RSSSF.com
Rules for classification: 1) points; 2) wins; 3) goal difference; 4) number of goals scored.

==== Group B ====
| Pos | Team | Pld | W | D | L | GF | GA | GD | Pts | Qualification or relegation |
|---|---|---|---|---|---|---|---|---|---|---|
| 1 | São Paulo | 19 | 12 | 4 | 3 | 18 | 12 | +6 | 28 | Qualified |
| 2 | Portuguesa | 19 | 6 | 7 | 6 | 27 | 28 | −1 | 19 | Qualified |
| 3 | Juventus | 19 | 7 | 3 | 9 | 32 | 33 | −1 | 17 | |
| 4 | Francana | 19 | 5 | 7 | 7 | 19 | 17 | +2 | 17 | |
| 5 | XV de Piracicaba | 19 | 4 | 8 | 7 | 15 | 19 | −4 | 16 | |

Updated to match(es) played on November 8, 1978. Source: RSSSF.com
Rules for classification: 1) points; 2) wins; 3) goal difference; 4) number of goals scored.

==== Group C ====
| Pos | Team | Pld | W | D | L | GF | GA | GD | Pts | Qualification or relegation |
|---|---|---|---|---|---|---|---|---|---|---|
| 1 | Guarani | 19 | 11 | 6 | 2 | 33 | 14 | +19 | 28 | Qualified |
| 2 | Corinthians | 19 | 9 | 8 | 2 | 24 | 17 | +7 | 26 | Qualified |
| 3 | Comercial | 19 | 8 | 5 | 6 | 23 | 22 | +1 | 21 | |
| 4 | São Bento | 19 | 6 | 5 | 8 | 14 | 23 | −9 | 17 | |
| 5 | Marília | 19 | 5 | 5 | 9 | 23 | 27 | −4 | 15 | |

Updated to match(es) played on November 8, 1978. Source: RSSSF.com
Rules for classification: 1) points; 2) wins; 3) goal difference; 4) number of goals scored.

==== Group D ====
| Pos | Team | Pld | W | D | L | GF | GA | GD | Pts | Qualification or relegation |
|---|---|---|---|---|---|---|---|---|---|---|
| 1 | Palmeiras | 19 | 9 | 6 | 4 | 26 | 15 | +11 | 24 | Qualified |
| 2 | XV de Jaú | 19 | 7 | 6 | 6 | 22 | 21 | +1 | 20 | Qualified |
| 3 | Botafogo | 19 | 5 | 9 | 5 | 16 | 13 | +3 | 19 | |
| 4 | América | 19 | 6 | 4 | 9 | 18 | 20 | −2 | 16 | |
| 5 | Ferroviária | 19 | 1 | 8 | 10 | 12 | 24 | −12 | 10 | |

Updated to match(es) played on November 8, 1978. Source: RSSSF.com
Rules for classification: 1) points; 2) wins; 3) goal difference; 4) number of goals scored.

==== Quarterfinals ====
| Team 1 | Score | Team 2 |
|---|---|---|
| São Paulo | 0–0 | Santos |
| Guarani | 1–1 | XV de Jaú |
| Palmeiras | 0–3 | Corinthians |
| Ponte Preta | 1–0 | Portuguesa |

==== Semifinals ====
| Team 1 | Score | Team 2 |
|---|---|---|
| Corinthians | 3–2 (a.e.t) | Guarani |
| Santos | 1–0 | Ponte Preta |

==== Finals ====
| Team 1 | Score | Team 2 |
|---|---|---|
| Corinthians | 1–0 | Santos |

=== Second round ===
==== Group A ====
| Pos | Team | Pld | W | D | L | GF | GA | GD | Pts | Qualification or relegation |
|---|---|---|---|---|---|---|---|---|---|---|
| 1 | Guarani | 19 | 7 | 8 | 4 | 24 | 16 | +8 | 22 | Qualified |
| 2 | Juventus | 19 | 8 | 5 | 6 | 33 | 27 | +6 | 21 | Qualified |
| 3 | Portuguesa Santista | 19 | 8 | 5 | 6 | 13 | 14 | −1 | 21 | |
| 4 | Palmeiras | 19 | 8 | 4 | 7 | 23 | 18 | +5 | 20 | |
| 5 | Paulista | 19 | 3 | 8 | 8 | 10 | 20 | −10 | 14 | |

Updated to match(es) played on April 27, 1979. Source: RSSSF.com
Rules for classification: 1) points; 2) wins; 3) goal difference; 4) number of goals scored.

==== Group B ====
| Pos | Team | Pld | W | D | L | GF | GA | GD | Pts | Qualification or relegation |
|---|---|---|---|---|---|---|---|---|---|---|
| 1 | Corinthians | 19 | 7 | 8 | 4 | 25 | 20 | +5 | 22 | Qualified |
| 2 | Botafogo | 19 | 7 | 8 | 4 | 23 | 19 | +4 | 22 | Qualified |
| 3 | Comercial | 19 | 5 | 7 | 7 | 10 | 19 | −9 | 17 | |
| 4 | Noroeste | 19 | 4 | 7 | 8 | 13 | 22 | −9 | 15 | |
| 5 | América | 19 | 3 | 9 | 7 | 19 | 29 | −10 | 15 | |

Updated to match(es) played on April 27, 1979. Source: RSSSF.com
Rules for classification: 1) points; 2) wins; 3) goal difference; 4) number of goals scored.

==== Group C ====
| Pos | Team | Pld | W | D | L | GF | GA | GD | Pts | Qualification or relegation |
|---|---|---|---|---|---|---|---|---|---|---|
| 1 | Ponte Preta | 19 | 12 | 5 | 2 | 39 | 16 | +23 | 29 | Qualified |
| 2 | Francana | 19 | 5 | 9 | 5 | 22 | 27 | −5 | 19 | Qualified |
| 3 | São Paulo | 19 | 6 | 4 | 9 | 24 | 27 | −3 | 16 | |
| 4 | Marília | 19 | 4 | 8 | 7 | 22 | 27 | −5 | 16 | |
| 5 | São Bento | 19 | 5 | 4 | 10 | 23 | 30 | −7 | 14 | |

Updated to match(es) played on April 27, 1979. Source: RSSSF.com
Rules for classification: 1) points; 2) wins; 3) goal difference; 4) number of goals scored.

==== Group D ====
| Pos | Team | Pld | W | D | L | GF | GA | GD | Pts | Qualification or relegation |
|---|---|---|---|---|---|---|---|---|---|---|
| 1 | Santos | 19 | 10 | 4 | 5 | 25 | 15 | +10 | 24 | Qualified |
| 2 | Ferroviária | 19 | 7 | 8 | 4 | 18 | 14 | +4 | 22 | Qualified |
| 3 | XV de Piracicaba | 19 | 6 | 8 | 5 | 16 | 16 | 0 | 20 | |
| 4 | XV de Jaú | 19 | 6 | 4 | 9 | 18 | 19 | −1 | 16 | |
| 5 | Portuguesa | 19 | 5 | 5 | 9 | 19 | 24 | −5 | 15 | |

Updated to match(es) played on April 27, 1979. Source: RSSSF.com
Rules for classification: 1) points; 2) wins; 3) goal difference; 4) number of goals scored.

==== Quarterfinals ====
| Team 1 | Score | Team 2 |
|---|---|---|
| Ponte Preta | 3–0 | Ferroviária |
| Santos | 2–1 | Francana |
| Guarani | 2–1 | Botafogo |
| Corinthians | 0–1 (a.e.t) | Juventus |

==== Semifinals ====
| Team 1 | Score | Team 2 |
|---|---|---|
| Santos | 0–1 (a.e.t) | Ponte Preta |
| Juventus | 0–2 | Guarani |

==== Finals ====
| Team 1 | Score | Team 2 |
|---|---|---|
| Ponte Preta | 1–1 (a.e.t) | Guarani |

=== Aggregate table ===
| Pos | Team | Pld | W | D | L | GF | GA | GD | Pts | Qualification or relegation |
|---|---|---|---|---|---|---|---|---|---|---|
| 1 | Ponte Preta | 38 | 20 | 13 | 5 | 56 | 26 | +30 | 53 | Qualified as stage finalists |
| 2 | Guarani | 38 | 18 | 14 | 6 | 57 | 30 | +27 | 50 | Qualified as stage finalists |
| 3 | Corinthians | 38 | 16 | 16 | 6 | 49 | 37 | +12 | 48 | Qualified as stage finalists |
| 4 | Santos | 38 | 17 | 13 | 8 | 52 | 30 | +22 | 47 | Qualified as stage finalists |
| 5 | São Paulo | 38 | 18 | 8 | 12 | 42 | 39 | +3 | 44 | Qualified |
| 6 | Palmeiras | 38 | 17 | 10 | 11 | 49 | 33 | +16 | 44 | Qualified |
| 7 | Botafogo | 38 | 12 | 17 | 9 | 39 | 32 | +7 | 41 | Qualified |
| 8 | Juventus | 38 | 15 | 8 | 15 | 65 | 60 | +5 | 38 | Qualified |
| 9 | Comercial | 38 | 13 | 12 | 13 | 33 | 41 | −8 | 38 | |
| 10 | XV de Jaú | 38 | 13 | 10 | 15 | 40 | 40 | 0 | 36 | |
| 11 | Francana | 38 | 10 | 16 | 12 | 41 | 44 | −3 | 36 | Qualified due to revenue |
| 12 | XV de Piracicaba | 38 | 10 | 16 | 12 | 32 | 48 | −16 | 36 | |
| 13 | Portuguesa | 38 | 11 | 12 | 15 | 46 | 52 | −6 | 34 | Qualified due to revenue |
| 14 | Ferroviária | 38 | 8 | 16 | 14 | 30 | 38 | −8 | 32 | |
| 15 | São Bento | 38 | 11 | 10 | 17 | 39 | 53 | −14 | 32 | |
| 16 | Noroeste | 38 | 10 | 11 | 17 | 25 | 44 | −19 | 31 | |
| 17 | Marília | 38 | 9 | 13 | 16 | 45 | 54 | −9 | 31 | |
| 18 | América | 38 | 9 | 13 | 16 | 27 | 49 | −22 | 31 | |
| 19 | Paulista | 38 | 6 | 18 | 14 | 22 | 36 | −14 | 30 | Relegation Playoffs |
| 20 | Portuguesa Santista | 38 | 10 | 8 | 20 | 24 | 48 | −24 | 28 | Relegated |

Updated to match(es) played on April 27, 1979. Source: RSSSF.com
Rules for classification: 1) points; 2) wins; 3) goal difference; 4) number of goals scored.

==== Relegation Playoffs ====
| Team 1 | Series | Team 2 | Game 1 | Game 2 | Game 3 |
|---|---|---|---|---|---|
| Velo Clube | 5–1 | Paulista | 3–1 | 0–0 | 1–0 |

=== Third round ===
==== Group A ====
| Pos | Team | Pld | W | D | L | GF | GA | GD | Pts | Qualification or relegation |
|---|---|---|---|---|---|---|---|---|---|---|
| 1 | Guarani | 9 | 5 | 3 | 1 | 19 | 7 | +12 | 13 | Qualified as stage finalists |
| 2 | São Paulo | 9 | 4 | 5 | 0 | 14 | 6 | +8 | 13 | Qualified as stage finalists |
| 3 | Corinthians | 9 | 5 | 2 | 2 | 16 | 11 | +5 | 12 | |
| 4 | Francana | 9 | 1 | 3 | 5 | 9 | 14 | −5 | 5 | |
| 5 | Botafogo | 9 | 1 | 0 | 8 | 7 | 24 | −17 | 2 | |

Updated to match(es) played on June 14, 1979. Source: RSSSF.com
Rules for classification: 1) points; 2) wins; 3) goal difference; 4) number of goals scored.

==== Group B ====
| Pos | Team | Pld | W | D | L | GF | GA | GD | Pts | Qualification or relegation |
|---|---|---|---|---|---|---|---|---|---|---|
| 1 | Palmeiras | 9 | 6 | 2 | 1 | 17 | 6 | +11 | 14 | Qualified as stage finalists |
| 2 | Santos | 9 | 5 | 0 | 4 | 18 | 9 | +9 | 10 | Qualified as stage finalists |
| 3 | Ponte Preta | 9 | 4 | 2 | 3 | 11 | 10 | +1 | 10 | |
| 4 | Juventus | 9 | 3 | 3 | 3 | 11 | 16 | −5 | 9 | |
| 5 | Portuguesa | 9 | 0 | 2 | 7 | 3 | 22 | −19 | 2 | |

Updated to match(es) played on June 14, 1979. Source: RSSSF.com
Rules for classification: 1) points; 2) wins; 3) goal difference; 4) number of goals scored.

=== Semifinals ===
| Team 1 | Score | Team 2 |
|---|---|---|
| Santos | 3–1 | Guarani |
| Palmeiras | 0–1 (a.e.t) | São Paulo |

=== Finals ===
| Team 1 | Series | Team 2 | Game 1 | Game 2 | Game 3 |
|---|---|---|---|---|---|
| São Paulo | 3–3 | Santos | 1–2 | 1–1 | 2-0 |

== Top Scores ==
| Rank | Player | Club | Goals |
|---|---|---|---|
| 1 | Juary | Santos | 29 |
| 2 | Ataliba | Juventus | 25 |
| 3 | Jorge Mendonça | Palmeiras | 24 |
| 4 | Sócrates | Corinthians | 20 |
| 5 | João Paulo | Santos | 16 |
