= Terto =

Brazilian footballer (1946–2024)

Personal information
- Full name: Tertuliano Severiano dos Santos
- Date of birth: 29 December 1946
- Place of birth: Recife, Pernambuco, Brazil
- Date of death: 9 April 2024 (aged 77)
- Place of death: São Paulo, Brazil
- Position: Forward

Senior career*
Years	Team	Apps	(Gls)
1965–1967	Santa Cruz		
1968–1977	São Paulo	500	(86)
1977–1978	Botafogo-SP		
1979–1980	Ferroviário-CE		
1981	Fortaleza		
1982	Catanduvense		
- * Club domestic league appearances and goals

Tertuliano Severiano dos Santos (29 December 1946 – 9 April 2024), better known as Terto, was a Brazilian professional footballer who played as a forward. Terto is the eighth player with the most games played for São Paulo FC, totaling 500 appearances. Terto is considered by the official website as one of the greatest players in the club's history.

== Death ==
Terto died of a heart attack in São Paulo, on 9 April 2024, at the age of 77.

== Honours ==
Santa Cruz

- Torneio Hexagonal Norte-Nordeste: 1967

São Paulo

- Campeonato Paulista: 1970, 1971, 1975
- Torneio Nunes Freire: 1976
- Trofeo Colombino: 1969

Ferroviário

- Campeonato Cearense: 1979

Individual

- Copa Libertadores top scorer: 1974
