= Antônio Silva (football manager) =

Brazilian football manager (born 1952)

Antonio Silva
Personal information
- Full name: Antonio Carlos da Silva
- Date of birth: August 24, 1952 (age 74)
- Place of birth: Guaratinguetá, Brazil
- Position: Midfielder

Youth career
- –1973: São Paulo

Senior career*
Years	Team	Apps	(Gls)
1973–1978	São Paulo	93	(8)

Managerial career
- 1995: Yokohama Flügels
- * Club domestic league appearances and goals

Antonio Carlos Silva (born August 24, 1952) is a Brazilian former football manager.

== Coaching career ==
In 1995, he signed with Yokohama Flügels and served as a coach under manager Bunji Kimura. In May, Kimura resigned and Silva became a new manager. He left the club end of 1995 season.

== Managerial statistics ==
Team	From	To	Record				
Team	From	To	G	W	D	L	Win %
Yokohama Flügels	1995	1995	38	16	0	22	42.11
Total			38	16	0	22	42.11
