= Ademir Chiarotti =

Brazilian footballer (1948–2013)

Ademir
Personal information
- Full name: Ademir Antônio Chiarotti
- Date of birth: July 20, 1948
- Place of birth: Piracicaba, Brazil
- Date of death: 13 October 2013 (aged 65)
- Place of death: Piracicaba, Brazil
- Position: Midfielder

Youth career
- –1966: MAF Piracicaba

Senior career*
Years	Team	Apps	(Gls)
1967–1969	XV de Piracicaba		
1970–1973	Ferroviária		
1974–1977	São Paulo	138	(9)
1977–1979	Portuguesa		
1979	Atlético Goianiense		
1980	Portuguesa		
- * Club domestic league appearances and goals as of 28 September 2023

Ademir Antônio Chiarotti (20 July 1948 – 13 October 2013), simply known as Ademir, was a Brazilian professional footballer, who played as a midfielder.

== Career ==
Ademir began his professional career at XV de Piracicaba. In 1970 he went to Ferroviária, playing until 1973. Then, Ademir moved to São Paulo (from 1974 to 1977) where did 138 appearances and scored 9 goals. At Portuguesa de Desportos, the player played from 1978 to 1980.

== Honours ==
São Paulo

- Campeonato Paulista: 1975

== Death ==
Ademir died from cancer in Piracicaba.
