= Nelsinho Baptista =

Brazilian football manager (born 1950)

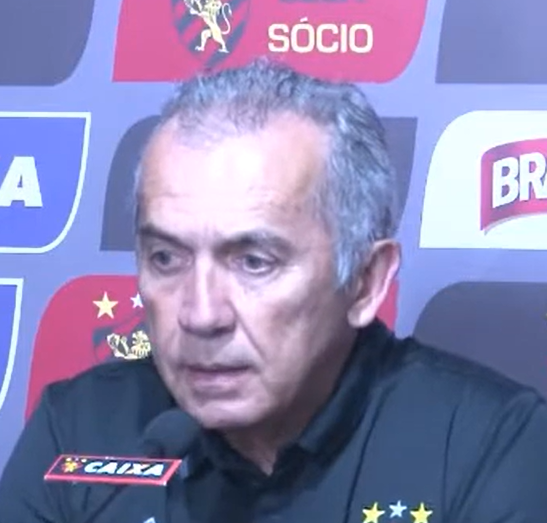
- Nelsinho Baptista in 2018

Personal information
- Full name: Nélson Baptista Júnior
- Date of birth: 22 July 1950 (age 76)
- Place of birth: Campinas, Brazil
- Position: Right-back

Youth career
- 1966–1967: Ponte Preta

Senior career*
Years	Team	Apps	(Gls)
1967–1970	Ponte Preta		
1971–1977	São Paulo	267	(5)
1977–1981	Santos	218	(10)
1982–1984	Juventus-SP		

Managerial career
- 1985: São Bento
- 1985: Ponte Preta
- 1986: Mogi Mirim
- 1986–1987: Inter de Limeira
- 1987: Ponte Preta
- 1987–1988: Atlético Paranaense
- 1989: Sporting Barranquilla
- 1989: São Bento
- 1989: América-SP
- 1990: Novorizontino
- 1990–1991: Corinthians
- 1991: Guarani
- 1991–1992: Palmeiras
- 1992–1993: Corinthians
- 1993–1994: Al-Hilal
- 1995–1996: Verdy Kawasaki
- 1996: Internacional
- 1996–1997: Corinthians
- 1997: Cruzeiro
- 1998: São Paulo
- 1999: Colo-Colo
- 2000: Portuguesa
- 2000–2001: Ponte Preta
- 2001–2002: São Paulo
- 2002–2003: Goiás
- 2003: Flamengo
- 2003: São Caetano
- 2003–2005: Nagoya Grampus Eight
- 2005: Santos
- 2006: São Caetano
- 2007: Ponte Preta
- 2007: Corinthians
- 2008–2009: Sport Recife
- 2009–2014: Kashiwa Reysol
- 2015–2017: Vissel Kobe
- 2018: Sport Recife
- 2019–2023: Kashiwa Reysol
- 2024: Ponte Preta
- * Club domestic league appearances and goals

Nélson "Nelsinho" Baptista Júnior (born 22 July 1950) is a Brazilian football coach and former player who played as a right-back.

== Playing career ==
Born in Campinas, São Paulo, he was known as just Nelsinho during his playing days, and made his first team debut with Ponte Preta on 21 May 1967, in a 1–0 Campeonato Paulista Divisão de Acesso loss to São Carlos. He became team captain in 1969, aged 19, and helped the side to achieve promotion to the Campeonato Paulista as champions.

Nelsinho moved to São Paulo in 1971, being a regular starter as the club won the 1975 Campeonato Paulista. He played 267 matches for the club during his six-and-a-half-year spell, scoring five goals.

In 1977, Nelsinho signed for Santos, making his debut on 6 November of that year in a 1–0 home loss to Botafogo-SP. A starter, he won the 1978 Campeonato Paulista and featured in 80 matches during the 1979 campaign, being the most utilized player of the squad during that year.

Nelsinho joined Juventus in 1981, and retired in the end of the 1984 season, at the age of 34.

== Coaching career ==
Shortly after retiring, Baptista took up coaching and was appointed São Bento head coach for the 1985 season. He subsequently had short spells at the helm of Ponte Preta and Mogi Mirim before taking over Inter de Limeira in 1986 in the place of Lori Sandri.

In 1987, Baptista was named Atlético Paranaense head coach, leading them to the third position of the Yellow Module and winning the 1988 Campeonato Paranaense. He left the club at the end of the season, and moved abroad for the first time in his career to take over Sporting Barranquilla in the Colombian Campeonato Profesional.

Sacked by the Colombian side in April 1989, Baptista was named at the helm of América-SP after a short spell back at São Bento; at América, his fitness coach was Vadão. In 1990, he led Novorizontino to the finals of the 1990 Campeonato Paulista against Bragantino, which was known as the Final Caipira.

In September 1990, Baptista was named Corinthians head coach, and led them to their first-ever Série A title.

Despite renewing his contract and winning the 1991 Supercopa do Brasil, Baptista was sacked by Timão in April 1991, after being knocked out from the 1991 Copa do Brasil and the 1991 Copa Libertadores. In June, he was hired by Palmeiras, but was dismissed in August 1992.

In 1992, Baptista returned to Corinthians after replacing Basílio, but was sacked in August 1993 after losing the 1993 Torneio Rio-São Paulo finals to his former side Palmeiras. He subsequently worked abroad, managing Al-Hilal in Saudi Arabia and Verdy Kawasaki in Japan, before returning to his home country in 1996 with Internacional.

Baptista left Inter to return to Corinthians in November 1996, where he won the 1997 Campeonato Paulista. After a poor performance in the 1997 Série A, he left and was named Cruzeiro head coach in August in the place of Paulo Autuori.

Baptista left Cruzeiro after losing the 1997 Intercontinental Cup to Borussia Dortmund, and was named in charge of São Paulo in February 1998. He won the year's Paulistão before leaving in September, and was in charge of Chilean side Colo-Colo during the 1999 season.

After being named head coach of Portuguesa for the 2000 campaign, Baptista resigned from the club on 3 June of that year. He returned to Ponte on 4 August, but was dismissed by the club on 29 May 2001, after he had agreed to a contract with São Paulo.

Baptista announced his departure from Tricolor on 25 April 2002, and signed for Goiás on 28 August. On 21 March 2003, he was announced as head coach of Flamengo, but resigned on 17 July.

Four days after leaving Flamengo, Baptista took over São Caetano, but left the club in July 2003 after accepting an offer from Japanese club Nagoya Grampus Eight.

Sacked by Nagoya Grampus on 19 September 2005, Baptista took over Santos twelve days later, but was also dismissed on 20 November, after six winless matches which included a 7–1 loss to rivals Corinthians and a 4–0 loss to Internacional. He returned to São Caetano on 14 December, but was relieved from his duties on 1 June 2006.

Baptista returned to Ponte for a fourth spell as head coach in 2007, but was sacked on 23 September of that year. Two days later, he returned to Corinthians, but was dismissed on 4 December, after failing to prevent the club's first-ever relegation.

Baptista was appointed Sport Recife head coach on 10 December 2007, and won the 2008 Copa do Brasil with the club. On 28 May 2009, he resigned after having altercations with the squad.

On 16 July 2009, Baptista returned to Japan to manage Kashiwa Reysol. Despite being unable to avoid relegation to J2 League at the end of the year, the club relented and allowed him to remain in charge. In 2011, Reysol under him won their first ever J1 League title, making history by becoming the first team to win the championship following promotion. In the same year, Nelsinho Baptista received the J. League Manager of the Year at the J. League awards in Yokohama.

Baptista switched Reysol for Vissel Kobe in the end of the 2014 season, being sacked from the latter on 16 August 2017. He returned to Sport on 13 December, but announced his departure from the club the following 24 April.

On 16 November 2018, Baptista agreed to return to Reysol after signing a three-year contract. The club announced his departure on 17 May 2023, with Masami Ihara taking his place.

On 29 May 2024, Baptista returned to Ponte after 17 years, replacing João Brigatti at the helm of the club. On 21 October, after a 1–0 loss to rivals Guarani, he resigned.

== Personal life ==
Baptista's son Eduardo is also a coach; both worked together for several years until 2011, when Eduardo returned to Brazil while Nelsinho remained in Japan.

== Managerial statistics ==
As of match played 5 July 2025

Managerial record by team and tenure
Team	Nat	From	To	Record							
Team	Nat	From	To	G	W	D	L	GF	GA	GD	Win %
São Bento	(Brazil)	1 May 1985	10 August 1985	19	8	3	8	14	21	−7	42.11
Ponte Preta	(Brazil)	14 August 1985	27 December 1985	19	4	10	5	21	21	+0	21.05
Mogi Mirim	(Brazil)	1 January 1986	28 May 1986	21	4	11	6	20	19	+1	19.05
Inter de Limeira	(Brazil)	1 June 1986	30 April 1987	58	30	18	10	77	49	+28	51.72
Ponte Preta	(Brazil)	1 May 1987	5 July 1987	16	3	8	5	9	13	−4	18.75
Athletico Paranaense	(Brazil)	10 July 1987	30 December 1988	70	25	29	16	65	46	+19	35.71
Barranquilla	(Colombia)	1 January 1989	30 June 1989	14	2	2	10	10	26	−16	14.29
América-SP	(Brazil)	4 July 1989	28 December 1989	10	1	6	3	3	5	−2	10.00
Novorizontino	(Brazil)	4 January 1990	28 August 1990	37	13	17	7	40	28	+12	35.14
Corinthians	(Brazil)	4 September 1990	30 April 1991	50	22	20	8	54	40	+14	44.00
Guarani	(Brazil)	2 May 1991	28 June 1991	5	3	0	2	4	3	+1	60.00
Palmeiras	(Brazil)	1 July 1991	30 June 1992	51	24	11	16	55	47	+8	47.06
Corinthians	(Brazil)	1 July 1992	31 December 1993	98	52	27	19	160	94	+66	53.06
Al Hilal	(Saudi Arabia)	1 January 1994	30 June 1994	13	7	4	2	22	9	+13	53.85
Tokyo Verdy	(Japan)	1 February 1995	25 April 1996	72	45	5	22	146	85	+61	62.50
Internacional	(Brazil)	7 May 1996	10 November 1996	31	13	7	11	46	38	+8	41.94
Corinthians	(Brazil)	26 November 1996	1 August 1997	44	23	12	9	84	52	+32	52.27
Cruzeiro	(Brazil)	18 August 1997	10 December 1997	24	8	7	9	34	34	+0	33.33
São Paulo	(Brazil)	1 January 1998	31 December 1998	59	26	12	21	108	82	+26	44.07
Colo-Colo	(Chile)	1 January 1999	19 October 1999	58	23	17	18	74	74	+0	39.66
Portuguesa	(Brazil)	5 January 2000	1 July 2000	32	13	12	7	61	42	+19	40.63
Ponte Preta	(Brazil)	30 July 2000	24 May 2001	51	26	11	14	103	68	+35	50.98
São Paulo	(Brazil)	25 May 2001	12 May 2002	68	32	16	20	152	100	+52	47.06
Goiás	(Brazil)	27 August 2002	18 March 2003	37	18	9	10	61	44	+17	48.65
Flamengo	(Brazil)	19 March 2003	16 July 2003	29	12	8	9	41	40	+1	41.38
São Caetano	(Brazil)	21 July 2003	28 July 2003	2	1	1	0	2	0	+2	50.00
Nagoya Grampus	(Japan)	29 July 2003	20 September 2005	90	34	23	33	140	137	+3	37.78
Santos	(Brazil)	27 September 2005	15 November 2005	10	3	2	5	12	21	−9	30.00
São Caetano	(Brazil)	1 January 2006	1 June 2006	32	14	7	11	44	43	+1	43.75
Ponte Preta	(Brazil)	30 January 2007	23 September 2007	43	18	10	15	70	58	+12	41.86
Corinthians	(Brazil)	25 September 2007	31 December 2007	11	2	5	4	11	13	−2	18.18
Sport Recife	(Brazil)	1 January 2008	28 May 2009	105	60	22	23	189	98	+91	57.14
Kashiwa Reysol	(Japan)	1 August 2009	31 January 2015	250	130	57	63	430	308	+122	52.00
Vissel Kobe	(Japan)	1 February 2015	15 August 2017	123	55	21	47	193	158	+35	44.72
Sport Recife	(Brazil)	1 January 2018	25 April 2018	17	7	7	3	25	15	+10	41.18
Kashiwa Reysol	(Japan)	1 February 2019	17 May 2023	196	81	43	72	281	235	+46	41.33
Ponte Preta	(Brazil)	29 May 2024	21 October 2024	25	8	5	12	26	33	−7	32.00
Total				1,888	847	482	559	2,961	2,209	+752	44.86

== Honours ==
=== Player ===
Ponte Preta

- Campeonato Paulista Divisão de Acesso: 1969

São Paulo

- Campeonato Paulista: 1975
- Torneio Nunes Freire: 1976

Santos

- Campeonato Paulista: 1978

=== Coach ===
Atlético Paranaense

- Campeonato Paranaense: 1988

Corinthians

- Campeonato Brasileiro Série A: 1990
- Supercopa do Brasil: 1991
- Campeonato Paulista: 1997

São Paulo

- Campeonato Paulista: 1998

Goiás

- Campeonato Goiano: 2003

Sport Recife

- Copa do Brasil: 2008
- Campeonato Pernambucano: 2008, 2009

Kashiwa Reysol

- J.League Division 1: 2011
- J.League Division 2: 2010, 2019
- J.League Cup: 2013
- Emperor's Cup: 2012
- Japanese Super Cup: 2012
- Suruga Bank Championship: 2014

Individual

- J.League Manager of the Year: 2011

== See also ==
- List of football managers with the most matches
