= Mauro Madureira =

Brazilian footballer

Personal information
- Full name: Mauro Madureira Arruda
- Date of birth: 16 August 1954 (age 72)
- Place of birth: Ourinhos, Brazil
- Position: Right winger

Youth career
- 1971–1973: São Paulo

Senior career*
Years	Team	Apps	(Gls)
1973–1977	São Paulo	99	(15)
1976	→ Marília (loan)		
1977	→ Paulista (loan)		
1977–1978	Sport Recife		
1978–1986	Cruzeiro	199	(72)
1981	→ Internacional (loan)		
1981	→ Náutico (loan)		
1984	→ Colorado-PR (loan)		
1985	→ Pinheiros-PR (loan)		
1986	Atlético Paranaense		
1987–1988	Coritiba		
1989	Atlético Goianiense		
1990	Rio Branco-MG		

International career
1974	Brazil U20		

Managerial career
- 2001: Francana
- 2002: Malutron
- 2003: Villa Nova
- 2006: Real Brasil-PR
- 2006–2007: Coritiba B
- 2007–2008: Londrina
- 2009: Londrina
- * Club domestic league appearances and goals as of 29 September 2023

Mauro Madureira (born 16 August 1954), is a Brazilian former professional footballer and manager, who played as a right winger.

== Career ==
Mauro began his career in São Paulo's youth sectors alongside Serginho Chulapa, who would become the club's historical top scorer. Reserve most of the time, he participated in the state title campaigns in 1975 and the Libertadores runner-up in 1974. He went to Sport where he became a hero, scoring the goal in extra time that gave the club the 1977 Campeonato Pernambucano title. Played for Cruzeiro for most of his career, and in addition to playing for four Curitiba teams at the time (before Pinheiros and Colorado merged).

== Managerial career ==
As a coach, he managed the teams of Francana, Malutron, Villa Nova-MG, Real Brasil, Coritiba B and Londrina.

== Honours ==
=== Player ===
Brazil U20

- South American U-20 Championship: 1974

São Paulo

- Campeonato Paulista: 1975

Sport Recife

- Campeonato Pernambucano: 1977

Internacional

- Campeonato Gaúcho: 1981

=== Individual ===
- 1980 Campeonato Mineiro top scorer: 18 goals
