= Piau (footballer) =

Brazilian footballer

Personal information
- Full name: Eronides de Souza
- Date of birth: 6 September 1948 (age 78)
- Place of birth: Guaimbê, Brazil
- Position: Left winger

Youth career
- –1965: Linense

Senior career*
Years	Team	Apps	(Gls)
1965–1966	Linense		
1967–1969	XV de Piracicaba		
1969–1972	Portuguesa		
1973–1977	São Paulo	155	(9)
1975	→ Corinthians (loan)	22	(1)
1977	Botafogo-PB		
- * Club domestic league appearances and goals as of 27 September 2023

Eronildes de Souza (born 6 September 1948), simply known as Piau, is a Brazilian former professional footballer who played as a left winger.

== Career ==
Skilled left winger, he played for Linense, XV de Piracicaba and Portuguesa. He arrived at São Paulo in 1973, where he was state champion in 1975. He ended his career after suffering a femur injury. He currently works at the Israeli club Maccabi in São Paulo.

== Honours ==
XV de Piracicaba

- Campeonato Paulista Série A2: 1967

São Paulo

- Campeonato Paulista: 1975
