= José Carlos Serrão =

Brazilian footballer and manager (born 1950)

Personal information
- Full name: José Carlos Serrão
- Date of birth: October 12, 1950 (age 76)
- Place of birth: São Paulo, Brazil
- Position: Left winger

Senior career*
Years	Team	Apps	(Gls)
1969–1977	São Paulo		
1977	Botafogo-PB		
1978	Joinville		
1979	Santo André		
1979	Anapolina		
1980	Cúcuta Deportivo		

Managerial career
- 1983–1987: São Paulo (assistant)
- 1987: Santo André
- 1988–1989: XV de Piracicaba
- 1990–1991: Francana
- 1991: Rio Branco-MG
- 1992: XV de Piracicaba
- 1992: Central
- 1993: Nacional-SP
- 1993: Marília
- 1994: Juventus-SP
- 1994: CRB
- 1995: Paysandu
- 1995: Londrina
- 1995: Mogi Mirim
- 1996: Goiatuba
- 1996–1997: Francana
- 1997: Araçatuba
- 1998: Rio Branco-MG
- 1999: Mogi Mirim
- 2000: Corinthians (Youth-interim)
- 2000: Ceará
- 2001: Portuguesa Santista
- 2002–2004: Suwon Bluewings (assistant)
- 2005: Guarani
- 2005: União Barbarense
- 2005–2006: Pogoń Szczecin
- 2007: Mogi Mirim
- 2008: Rio Preto
- 2008: Anapolina
- 2009: Marília
- 2010: Sertãozinho
- 2010–2011: Mogi Mirim
- 2011: São Bento
- 2011: América-SP
- 2011: Central
- 2012: Itapirense
- 2012: Gamba Osaka
- 2012: Icasa
- 2012–2013: São Carlos
- 2013: Juventus-SP
- 2014–2015: Sertãozinho
- * Club domestic league appearances and goals

José Carlos Serrão (born October 12, 1950) is a Brazilian manager and former football player.

On 27 March 2012, Jose Carlos Serrao having lasted only five games as Gamba Osaka manager, the former Asian champions sacked the Brazilian and replaced him with one of the club's former midfielders, Masanobu Matsunami.

== Managerial statistics ==
Team	From	To	Record				
Team	From	To	G	W	D	L	Win %
Gamba Osaka	2012	2012	3	0	0	3	0.00
Total			3	0	0	3	0.00

== Honours ==
=== Player ===
São Paulo

- Campeonato Paulista U-20: 1969
- Campeonato Paulista: 1970, 1971 e 1975
- Campeonato Brasileiro Série A: 1977

Botafogo-PB

- Campeonato Paraibano: 1977

Joinville

- Campeonato Catarinense: 1978

=== Manager ===
Rio Branco-MG

Minas Gerais Campeonato Mineiro - Módulo II: 1998
