= José Poy =

Argentine footballer (1926–1996)

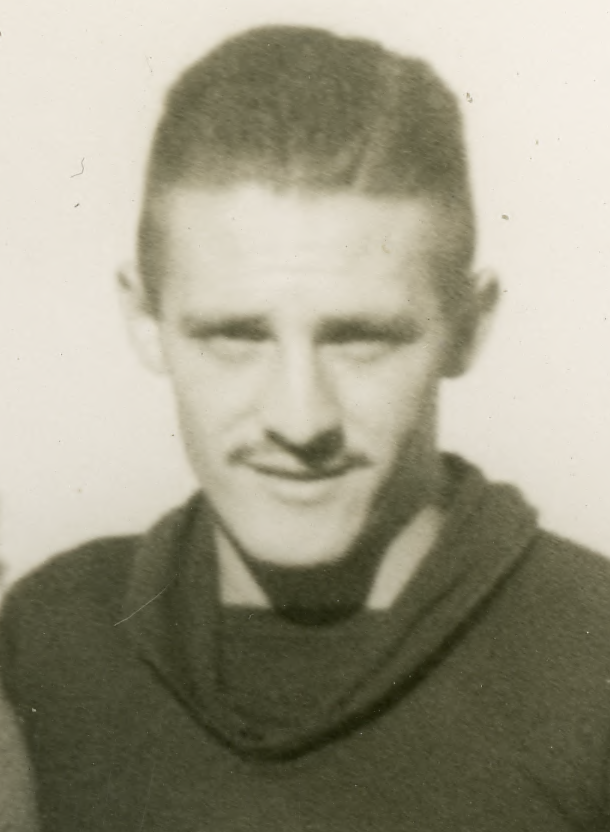
- Poy in 1945

Personal information
- Date of birth: 11 April 1926
- Place of birth: Rosario, Argentina
- Date of death: 8 February 1996 (aged 69)
- Place of death: São Paulo, Brazil
- Position: Goalkeeper

Senior career*
Years	Team	Apps	(Gls)
1944–1946	Rosario Central		
1947	Banfield		
1948–1962	São Paulo	565	(0)

Managerial career
- 1964–1965: São Paulo
- 1971: São Paulo
- 1972: São Paulo
- 1973–1976: São Paulo
- 1981: Santa Cruz
- 1982–1983: São Paulo
- 1984: XV de Jaú
- 1987: Inter de Limeira
- 1987–1988: Portuguesa
- 1992–1993: XV de Jaú
- 1994–1995: Portuguesa
- * Club domestic league appearances and goals

José Poy (11 April 1926 – 8 February 1996) was an Argentine football player and coach who spent the majority of his career with São Paulo in Brazil, making a total of 565 appearances. After retiring as a player, Poy spent a number of spells as manager of São Paulo.
