= 1975 Campeonato Paulista =

Campeonato Paulista – Série A1
- Season: 1975
- Champions: São Paulo (11th title)
- Copa Brasil: São Paulo; Portuguesa; Corinthians; Santos; Ponte Preta; Guarani; Palmeiras; Botafogo
- Matches played: 277
- Goals scored: 623 (2.25 per match)
- Top goalscorer: Serginho Chulapa (São Paulo) – 22 goals
- Biggest home win: Guarani 5-0 São Bento (March 30, 1975); São Paulo 5-0 Noroeste (July 10, 1975)
- Biggest away win: Paulista 0-3 Palmeiras (March 30, 1975); Ferroviária 0-3 Corinthians (April 6, 1975); São Bento 0-3 Palmeiras (April 16, 1975); Juventus 0-3 Corinthians (April 30, 1975); Marília 2-5 Portuguesa (May 21, 1975)
- Highest scoring: Portuguesa Santista 6-3 Botafogo (April 26, 1975)

The 1975 Campeonato Paulista da Divisão Especial de Futebol Profissional was the 74th season of São Paulo's top professional football league. São Paulo won the championship for the 11th time. No teams were relegated. São Paulo's Serginho Chulapa was the top goal scorer with 22 goals.

== Championship ==
The championship was divided into two rounds; in the first round, the eighteen teams all played against themselves once, with the team with the most points winning the round, and in the second round, the teams would be divided into two groups, with each team playing once against the teams of the other group. The three teams with the most points in each group qualify to a final hexagonal to define the champions of the round, and the winners of each round qualified to the finals. In the second round, the remaining twelve teams would all play against each other once, and the team with the most points would be champion.

=== First round ===
Pos	Team	Pld	W	D	L	GF	GA	GD	Pts	Qualification or relegation
1	São Paulo	18	15	3	0	29	5	+24	33	Qualified to the finals
2	Corinthians	18	11	5	2	29	13	+16	27	
3	Palmeiras	18	11	4	3	25	9	+16	26	
4	Portuguesa	18	11	3	4	26	16	+10	25	
5	Guarani	18	8	7	3	33	19	+14	23	
6	Marília	18	7	6	5	27	28	−1	20	
7	Santos	18	8	3	7	29	21	+8	19	
8	Saad (G)	18	7	4	7	23	25	−2	18	
9	Ponte Preta	18	5	7	6	22	17	+5	17	
10	Botafogo	18	5	6	7	21	28	−7	16	
11	XV de Piracicaba	18	6	4	8	15	22	−7	16	
12	Juventus	18	5	5	8	16	19	−3	15	
13	Noroeste	18	1	12	5	7	12	−5	14	
14	América	18	6	2	10	17	24	−7	14	
15	Portuguesa Santista	18	4	5	9	23	31	−8	13	
16	Ferroviária	18	3	7	8	12	24	−12	13	
17	São Bento	18	1	10	7	16	28	−12	12	
18	Paulista	18	3	5	10	12	30	−18	11	
19	Comercial	18	2	6	10	15	26	−11	10	

Updated to match(es) played on May 25, 1975. Source: RSSSF.com
Rules for classification: 1) points; 2) goal difference; 3) wins; 4) number of goals scored.
(G) Guests

=== Second round ===
==== Group A ====
Pos	Team	Pld	W	D	L	GF	GA	GD	Pts	Qualification or relegation
1	Portuguesa	9	5	4	0	14	4	+10	14	Qualified
2	Palmeiras	9	6	2	1	14	9	+5	14	Qualified
3	Santos	9	4	3	2	7	4	+3	11	Qualified
4	Noroeste	9	3	3	3	9	13	−4	9	
5	Comercial	9	3	2	4	8	11	−3	8	
6	São Bento	9	0	5	4	5	15	−10	5	
7	Portuguesa Santista	9	0	3	6	5	13	−8	3	
8	Paulista	9	1	1	7	5	14	−9	3	
9	Marília	9	1	1	7	4	15	−11	3	
10	Botafogo	9	0	2	7	6	21	−15	2	

Updated to match(es) played on July 20, 1975. Source: RSSSF.com
Rules for classification: 1) points; 2) goal difference; 3) wins; 4) number of goals scored.

==== Group B ====
Pos	Team	Pld	W	D	L	GF	GA	GD	Pts	Qualification or relegation
1	São Paulo	10	8	2	0	25	6	+19	18	Qualified
2	América	10	6	1	3	14	6	+8	13	Qualified
3	Corinthians	10	5	2	3	16	11	+5	12	Qualified
4	Guarani	10	4	4	2	10	7	+3	12	
5	Ferroviária	10	3	5	2	12	10	+2	11	
6	XV de Piracicaba	10	3	5	2	10	9	+1	11	
7	Juventus	10	4	3	3	10	9	+1	11	
8	Ponte Preta	10	4	2	4	11	8	+3	10	
9	Saad (G)	10	4	2	4	11	11	0	10	

Updated to match(es) played on July 20, 1975. Source: RSSSF.com
Rules for classification: 1) points; 2) goal difference; 3) wins; 4) number of goals scored.
(G) Guests

==== Second phase ====
Pos	Team	Pld	W	D	L	GF	GA	GD	Pts	Qualification or relegation
1	Portuguesa	5	2	2	1	6	3	+3	6	Qualified to the finals
2	Santos	5	3	0	2	6	5	+1	6	
3	São Paulo	5	2	2	1	5	4	+1	6	
4	América	5	2	1	2	4	4	0	5	
5	Corinthians	5	1	2	2	4	6	−2	4	
6	Palmeiras	5	1	1	3	4	7	−3	3	

Updated to match(es) played on August 10, 1975. Source: RSSSF.com
Rules for classification: 1) points; 2) goal difference; 3) wins; 4) number of goals scored.

=== Finals ===
Team 1	Agg.	Team 2	1st leg	2nd leg
São Paulo	1–1 (3-0 pen.)	Portuguesa	1–0	0–1

== Top Scores ==
Rank	Player	Club	Goals
1	Serginho Chulapa	São Paulo	22
2	Rui Rei	Ponte Preta	16
3	Cláudio Adão	Santos	13
3	Enéas	Portuguesa	13
5	Geraldão	Botafogo	12
5	Davi	Guarani	12
6	Pedro Rocha	São Paulo	11
7	Vaguinho	Corinthians	10
7	Tatá	Portuguesa	10
7	Itamar	Marília	10
7	Benê	Saad	10
7	Davi	Portuguesa Santista	10
12	Nei	Palmeiras	9
12	Darcy	América	9
12	Dicá	Portuguesa	9
12	Reinaldo	Ferroviaría	9
