= 1972 São Paulo FC season =

São Paulo
1972 season
- Chairman: Henri Couri Aidar
- Manager: Alfredo Ramos; Vail Mota; José Poy
- Campeonato Brasileiro: Second stage
- Copa Libertadores: Second stage
- Campeonato Paulista: Runners-up
- Top goalscorer: League: Pedro Rocha (18); All: Toninho Guerreiro (28)

The 1972 football season was São Paulo's 43rd season since club's existence.

== Statistics ==
=== Scorers ===
Position	Nation	Playing position	Name	Copa Libertadores	Campeonato Paulista	Campeonato Brasileiro	Others	Total
1	(Brazil)	FW	Toninho Guerreiro	7	17	0	4	28
2	(Uruguay)	MF	Pedro Rocha	3	4	18	0	25
3	(Brazil)	FW	Terto	1	4	7	3	15
4	(Brazil)	MF	Zé Carlos	2	2	4	2	10
5	(Brazil)	FW	Everaldo	0	0	4	2	6
6	(Brazil)	FW	Paulo Nani	0	1	3	0	4
=	(Brazil)	FW	Toninho	1	0	3	0	4
7	(Brazil)	MF	Édson Cegonha	0	0	3	0	3
8	(Brazil)	DF	Roberto Dias	0	0	2	0	2
=	(Brazil)	MF	Wilton	0	0	0	2	2
=	(Brazil)	FW	Zé Roberto	0	0	0	2	2
9	(Brazil)	MF	Carlos Alberto	0	0	0	1	1
=	(Brazil)	DF	Gilberto Sorriso	0	1	0	0	1
=	(Brazil)	DF	Nélson	0	0	1	0	1
=	(Brazil)	MF	Nenê	0	0	1	0	1
=	(Brazil)	FW	Paraná	0	0	1	0	1
			Own goals	0	3	2	1	6
			Total	14	32	49	21	116

=== Overall ===
Games played	71 (10 Copa Libertadores, 22 Campeonato Paulista, 28 Campeonato Brasileiro, 11 Friendly match)
Games won	37 (4 Copa Libertadores, 14 Campeonato Paulista, 13 Campeonato Brasileiro, 6 Friendly match)
Games drawn	21 (4 Copa Libertadores, 8 Campeonato Paulista, 6 Campeonato Brasileiro, 3 Friendly match)
Games lost	13 (2 Copa Libertadores, 0 Campeonato Paulista, 9 Campeonato Brasileiro, 2 Friendly match)
Goals scored	116
Goals conceded	56
Goal difference	+60
Best result	6–0 (A) v Náutico - Campeonato Brasileiro - 1972.11.06
Worst result	0–4 (A) v Coritiba - Campeonato Brasileiro - 1972.10.15
Most appearances	Gilberto Sorriso (68)
Top scorer	Toninho Guerreiro (28)

Source: São Paulo FC

== Friendlies ==
Jan 25 National	São Paulo	2–0	Atlético Mineiro	São Paulo
	Toninho Guerreiro 13', 45'			Stadium: Estádio Cícero Pompeu de Toledo (Morumbi); Referee: José Favilli Neto

Feb 9 National	São Paulo	1–1	Ponte Preta	São Paulo
	Zé Roberto 61'		Ditinho 38'	Stadium: Estádio Cícero Pompeu de Toledo (Morumbi); Referee: Emídio Marques de Mesquita

Jun 15 National	Comercial	2–1	São Paulo	Ribeirão Preto
	Brim 53'; Hélio 89'		Wilton 78'	Stadium: Estádio Dr. Francisco de Palma Travassos; Referee: Vilmar Serra

Jun 18 National	Uberaba	1–1	São Paulo	Uberaba
	Gibe 21'		Wilton 54'	Stadium: Estádio Municipal João Guido (Uberabão); Referee: Juan de La Passion

Jun 25 National	Umuarama	0–2	São Paulo	Umuarama
			Cida 30' (o.g.); Toninho Guerreiro 37'	Referee: José Tait

Jun 29 National	Corinthians (PP)	1–4	São Paulo	Presidente Prudente
	Fioti 82'		Zé Carlos 3', 87'; Carlos Alberto 5'; Toninho Guerreiro 53'	Referee: José de Oliveira

Jul 2 National	Catanduvense	2–0	São Paulo	Catanduva
	Joãozinho 50'; China 86'			Stadium: Estádio Municipal Silvio Salles (Caldeirão da Bruxa); Referee: Roberto Nunes Morgado

Jul 9 National	Vasco da Gama (Americana)	0–4	São Paulo	Americana
			Everaldo 6', 37'; Terto 53', 77'	Stadium: Estádio Vitório Scuro; Referee: Dulcidio Wanderley Boschilia

Sep 7 National	Cascavel EC	0–4	São Paulo	Cascavel
				Stadium: Ciro Nardi

=== Torneio Laudo Natel ===
Feb 20 National	São Bento	1–2	São Paulo	Sorocaba
	Roberto 87'		Zé Roberto 50'; Terto 72'	Stadium: Estádio Humberto Reale; Referee: Roberto Nunes Morgado

Feb 25 National	Palmeiras	0–0 (7–6 p)	São Paulo	São Paulo
				Stadium: Estádio Municipal Paulo Machado de Carvalho (Pacaembu); Referee: Oscar Scolfaro

== Official competitions ==
=== Copa Libertadores ===
Jan 30 First stage	Atlético Mineiro (Brazil)	2–2	(Brazil) São Paulo	Belo Horizonte
	Vanderlei 76'; Dario 83'		Terto 5'; Toninho Guerreiro 58'	Stadium: Estádio Governador Magalhães Pinto (Mineirão); Attendance: 35,000; Referee: Arnaldo César Coelho

Mar 1 First stage	São Paulo (Brazil)	3–1	(Paraguay) Olimpia	São Paulo
	Toninho Guerreiro 9', 83'; Pedro Rocha 75'		Godoy 22'	Stadium: Estádio Cícero Pompeu de Toledo (Morumbi); Attendance: 20,000; Referee: Angel Coerezza (Argentina)

Mar 5 First stage	São Paulo (Brazil)	4–0	(Paraguay) Cerro Porteño	São Paulo
	Toninho 14'; Pedro Rocha 48'; Zé Carlos 72'; Toninho Guerreiro 88'			Stadium: Estádio Cícero Pompeu de Toledo (Morumbi); Attendance: 40,000; Referee: Eduardo Vilanes (Argentina)

Mar 9 First stage	São Paulo (Brazil)	0–0	(Brazil) Atlético Mineiro	São Paulo
				Stadium: Estádio Cícero Pompeu de Toledo (Morumbi); Referee: Arnaldo César Coelho

Mar 23 First stage	Cerro Porteño (Paraguay)	3–2	(Brazil) São Paulo	Asunción
	Marín 13', 28'; Arrua 41'		Toninho Guerreiro 65', 74'	Stadium: Estadio de los Defensores del Chaco; Referee: Alberto Tejada (Peru)

Mar 26 First stage	Olimpia (Paraguay)	0–1	(Brazil) São Paulo	Asunción
			Zé Carlos 9'	Stadium: Estadio de los Defensores del Chaco; Referee: Rafael Hormazabal (Chile)

Apr 12 Second stage	Barcelona (Ecuador)	0–0	(Brazil) São Paulo	Guayaquil
				Stadium: Estadio Modelo Alberto Spencer Herrera; Referee: Ramón Barreto (Uruguay)

Apr 21 Second stage	São Paulo (Brazil)	1–1	(Ecuador) Barcelona	São Paulo
	Pedro Rocha 31'		Mora 44'	Stadium: Estádio Cícero Pompeu de Toledo (Morumbi); Referee: Alberto Tejada (Peru)

Apr 27 Second stage	São Paulo (Brazil)	1–0	(Argentina) Independiente	São Paulo
	Toninho Guerreiro 81'			Stadium: Estádio Cícero Pompeu de Toledo (Morumbi); Referee: Rafael Hormazabal (Chile)

May 4 Second stage	Independiente (Argentina)	2–0	(Brazil) São Paulo	Avellaneda
	Magan 20'; Mircole 69'			Stadium: Estadio Almirante Cordero; Referee: Guillermo Velásquez (Colombia)

==== Record ====
Final Position	Points	Matches	Wins	Draws	Losses	Goals For	Goals Away	Win%
4th	12	10	4	4	2	14	10	60%

=== Campeonato Paulista ===
Mar 15 First stage 1	São Paulo	3–1	Ferroviária	São Paulo
	Toninho Guerreiro 5', 11'; Fernando 74' (o.g.)		Itamar 23'	Stadium: Estádio Cícero Pompeu de Toledo (Morumbi); Referee: Emídio Marques de Mesquita

Mar 19 First stage 2	São Paulo	0–0	Corinthians	São Paulo
				Stadium: Estádio Cícero Pompeu de Toledo (Morumbi); Referee: José Favilli Neto

Apr 3 First stage 3	Ponte Preta	0–0	São Paulo	Campinas
				Stadium: Estádio Moisés Lucarelli; Referee: Armando Marques

Apr 7 First stage 4	São Bento	0–2	São Paulo	Sorocaba
			Terto 17'; Pedro Rocha 74'	Stadium: Estádio Humberto Reale; Referee: Oscar Scolfaro

Apr 16 First stage 5	Santos	1–3	São Paulo	São Paulo
	Alcindo 25'		Oberdã 6' (o.g.); Toninho Guerreiro 44', 79'	Stadium: Estádio Municipal Paulo Machado de Carvalho (Pacaembu); Referee: José de Oliveira

Apr 30 First stage 6	São Paulo	1–0	Portuguesa	São Paulo
	Terto 77'			Stadium: Estádio Municipal Paulo Machado de Carvalho (Pacaembu); Referee: Armando Marques

May 10 First stage 7	São Paulo	1–0	Juventus	São Paulo
	Gilberto 76'			Stadium: Estádio Cícero Pompeu de Toledo (Morumbi); Referee: Dulcidio Wanderley Boschilia

May 13 First stage 8	São Paulo	5–0	XV de Piracicaba	São Paulo
	Toninho Guerreiro 33', 45', 84'; Pedro Rocha 48'; Zé Carlos 60'			Stadium: Estádio Cícero Pompeu de Toledo (Morumbi); Referee: Vilmar Serra

May 17 First stage 9	São Paulo	4–0	Guarani	São Paulo
	Zé Carlos 30'; Toninho Guerreiro 48', 70', 75'			Stadium: Estádio Cícero Pompeu de Toledo (Morumbi); Referee: José de Oliveira

May 21 First stage 10	São Paulo	0–0	Palmeiras	São Paulo
				Stadium: Estádio Cícero Pompeu de Toledo (Morumbi); Referee: Emídio Marques de Mesquita

May 28 First stage 11	São Paulo	2–1	América	São Paulo
	Toninho Guerreiro 44'; Paulo 53'		Mílton 89'	Stadium: Estádio Cícero Pompeu de Toledo (Morumbi); Referee: José Favilli Neto

Jul 15 Second stage 1	São Paulo	1–0	São Bento	São Paulo
	Toninho Guerreiro 18'			Stadium: Estádio Cícero Pompeu de Toledo (Morumbi); Referee: Emídio Marques de Mesquita

Jul 19 Second stage 2	XV de Piracicaba	0–0	São Paulo	Piracicaba
				Stadium: Estádio Barão da Serra Negra; Referee: José de Oliveira

Jul 23 Second stage 3	São Paulo	2–0	Santos	São Paulo
	Pedro Rocha 14'; Altivo 51' (o.g.)			Stadium: Estádio Cícero Pompeu de Toledo (Morumbi); Attendance: 40,531; Referee: Armando Marques

Jul 26 Second stage 4	São Paulo	1–0	Juventus	São Paulo
	Toninho Guerreiro 77'			Stadium: Estádio Municipal Paulo Machado de Carvalho (Pacaembu); Attendance: 4,201; Referee: Dulcidio Wanderley Boschilia

Jul 30 Second stage 5	Guarani	0–1	São Paulo	Campinas
			Toninho Guerreiro 88'	Stadium: Estádio Brinco de Ouro da Princesa; Referee: Armando Marques

Aug 6 Second stage 6	Corinthians	1–1	São Paulo	São Paulo
	Lance 51'		Toninho Guerreiro 75'	Stadium: Estádio Cícero Pompeu de Toledo (Morumbi); Referee: José de Oliveira

Aug 13 Second stage 7	Ferroviária	1–1	São Paulo	Araraquara
	Luizinho 60'		Toninho Guerreiro 21'	Stadium: Estádio Doutor Adhemar de Barros (Fonte Luminosa); Referee: Vilmar Serra

Aug 16 Second stage 8	São Paulo	1–0	Portuguesa	São Paulo
	Toninho Guerreiro 48'			Stadium: Estádio Cícero Pompeu de Toledo (Morumbi); Attendance: 18,369; Referee: José de Oliveira

Aug 19 Second stage 9	São Paulo	1–1	Ponte Preta	São Paulo
	Terto 61'		Valdomiro 90'	Stadium: Estádio Cícero Pompeu de Toledo (Morumbi); Referee: Armando Marques

Aug 27 Second stage 10	América	1–2	São Paulo	São José do Rio Preto
	Milton 19'		Terto 11'; Pedro Rocha 84'	Stadium: Estádio Mário Alves Mendonça; Attendance: 10,754; Referee: Wilmar Serra

Sep 3 Final	Palmeiras	0–0	São Paulo	São Paulo
				Stadium: Estádio Municipal Paulo Machado de Carvalho (Pacaembu); Referee: Oscar Scolfaro

==== Record ====
Final Position	Points	Matches	Wins	Draws	Losses	Goals For	Goals Away	Win%
2nd	36	22	14	8	0	32	7	81%

=== Campeonato Brasileiro ===
Sep 10 First stage 1	Grêmio	2–0	São Paulo	Porto Alegre
	Oberti 18'; Laírton 57'			Stadium: Estádio Olímpico Monumental; Referee: Arnaldo César Coelho

Sep 13 First stage 2	ABC	0–3	São Paulo	Natal
			Paulo 28'; Pedro Rocha 50', 70'	Stadium: Estádio Humberto de Alencar Castelo Branco (Castelão); Attendance: 19,155; Referee: José Marçal Filho

Sep 17 First stage 3	Ceará	1–1	São Paulo	Fortaleza
	Da Costa 86'		Toninho 72'	Stadium: Estádio Presidente Vargas; Attendance: 23,986; Referee: José Aldo Pereira

Sep 21 First stage 4	São Paulo	1–1	Portuguesa	São Paulo
	Toninho 71'		Enéas 29'	Stadium: Estádio Cícero Pompeu de Toledo (Morumbi); Attendance: 3,860; Referee: Emídio Marques

Sep 24 First stage 5	São Paulo	0–0	Flamengo	São Paulo
				Stadium: Estádio Cícero Pompeu de Toledo (Morumbi); Referee: Agomar Martins

Sep 28 First stage 6	Santos	1–0	São Paulo	São Paulo
	Adilson 78'			Stadium: Estádio Municipal Paulo Machado de Carvalho (Pacaembu); Attendance: 12,440; Referee: Dulcídio Wanderley Boschilia

Oct 1 First stage 7	Remo	0–1	São Paulo	Belém
			Zé Carlos 61'	Stadium: Estádio Evandro Almeida (Baenão); Attendance: 13,019; Referee: José de Assis Aragão

Oct 4 First stage 8	Nacional-AM	1–1	São Paulo	Manaus
	Campos 86'		Toninho 40'	Stadium: Estádio Vivaldo Lima (Vivaldão); Referee: Arnaldo César Coelho

Oct 8 First stage 9	Bahia	1–0	São Paulo	Salvador
	Douglas 47'			Stadium: Estádio Octávio Mangabeira (Fonte Nova); Referee: Armando Marques

Oct 11 First stage 10	São Paulo	0–1	Vasco da Gama	São Paulo
			Jaílson 58'	Stadium: Estádio Municipal Paulo Machado de Carvalho (Pacaembu); Attendance: 5,938; Referee: Armando Marques

Oct 15 First stage 11	Coritiba	4–0	São Paulo	Curitiba
	Flecha 31'; Zé Roberto 61', 76'; Cláudio 85'			Stadium: Estádio Belfort Duarte; Referee: Arnaldo César Coelho

Oct 18 First stage 12	São Paulo	3–1	Corinthians	São Paulo
	Paulo 45'; Terto 70', 81'		Rivellino 53'	Stadium: Estádio Municipal Paulo Machado de Carvalho (Pacaembu); Attendance: 40,720; Referee: Dulcídio Wanderley Boschilia

Oct 21 First stage 13	São Paulo	0–3	Fluminense	São Paulo
			Jair 31', 79'; Rubens 45'	Stadium: Estádio Cícero Pompeu de Toledo (Morumbi); Referee: Silvio David

Oct 25 First stage 14	Santa Cruz	2–2	São Paulo	Recife
	Betinho 11'; Erb 86'		Terto 28'; Édson 30'	Stadium: Estádio José do Rego Maciel (Arruda); Referee: José de Assis Aragão

Oct 29 First stage 15	São Paulo	2–1	Cruzeiro	São Paulo
	Pedro Rocha 70', 87'		Dirceu Lopes 53'	Stadium: Estádio Cícero Pompeu de Toledo (Morumbi); Attendance: 13,625; Referee: Armando Marques

Nov 2 First stage 16	São Paulo	2–1	Atlético Mineiro	São Paulo
	Pedro Rocha 57', 62'		Bibi 37'	Stadium: Estádio Cícero Pompeu de Toledo (Morumbi); Attendance: 12,326; Referee: Valquir Pimentel

Nov 5 First stage 17	Náutico	0–6	São Paulo	Recife
			Paraná 8'; Pedro Rocha 35', 64'; Nélson 62'; Terto 67'; Dias 82'	Stadium: Estádio José do Rego Maciel (Arruda); Referee: Carlos Floriano Vidal

Nov 8 First stage 18	CRB	2–6	São Paulo	Maceió
	Édson 65'; Orlandinho 89'		Édson 6'; Pedro Rocha 26', 28', 63'; Terto 38'; Everaldo 41'	Stadium: Estádio Rei Pelé; Referee: Armando Marques

Nov 11 First stage 19	Botafogo	3–2	São Paulo	Rio de Janeiro
	Jairzinho 11'; Dorinho 30'; Zequinha 56'		Pedro Rocha 21'; Terto 35'	Stadium: Estádio Jornalista Mário Filho (Maracanã); Attendance: 14,141; Referee: José Luís Barreto

Nov 16 First stage 20	São Paulo	2–1	América-MG	São Paulo
	Pedro Rocha 15', 58'		Juca Show 16'	Stadium: Estádio Municipal Paulo Machado de Carvalho (Pacaembu); Attendance: 30,789; Referee: José Mário Vinhas

Nov 19 First stage 21	São Paulo	2–0	America-RJ	São Paulo
	Zé Carlos 4', 61'			Stadium: Estádio Cícero Pompeu de Toledo (Morumbi); Attendance: 11,628; Referee: Armando Marques

Nov 22 First stage 22	Palmeiras	0–0	São Paulo	São Paulo
				Stadium: Estádio Municipal Paulo Machado de Carvalho (Pacaembu); Attendance: 26,105; Referee: Oscar Scolfaro

Nov 25 First stage 23	Internacional	3–1	São Paulo	Porto Alegre
	Escurinho 12'; Volmir 29'; Bráulio 37'		Pedro Rocha 61'	Stadium: Estádio José Pinheiro Borba (Beira-Rio); Referee: Arnaldo César Coelho

Nov 29 First stage 24	Sergipe	0–5	São Paulo	São Paulo
			João Carlos 34' (o.g.); Pedro Rocha 38', 60'; Everaldo 77'; Nenê 89'	Stadium: Estádio Lourival Baptista (Batistão); Attendance: 5,485; Referee: José de Assis Aragão

Dec 3 First stage 25	São Paulo	5–2	Vitória	São Paulo
	Válter 9' (o.g.); Zé Carlos 49'; Everaldo 61', 70'; Pedro Rocha 90'		Mário Sérgio 15'; Giriba 59'	Stadium: Estádio Cícero Pompeu de Toledo (Morumbi); Referee: Arnaldo César Coelho

Dec 10 Second stage 1	São Paulo	2–0	Palmeiras	São Paulo
	Dias 65'; Terto 85'			Stadium: Estádio Cícero Pompeu de Toledo (Morumbi); Attendance: 42,010; Referee: Arnaldo César Coelho

Dec 13 Second stage 2	São Paulo	2–0	Coritiba	São Paulo
	Paulo 5'; Édson 44'			Stadium: Estádio Municipal Paulo Machado de Carvalho (Pacaembu); Attendance: 46,441; Referee: José de Assis Aragão

Dec 16 Second stage 3	America-RJ	1–0	São Paulo	Rio de Janeiro
	Mauro 63'			Stadium: Estádio Jornalista Mário Filho (Maracanã); Attendance: 3,648; Referee: Arnaldo César Coelho

==== Record ====
Final Position	Points	Matches	Wins	Draws	Losses	Goals For	Goals Away	Win%
9th	32	28	13	6	9	49	32	57%
