= 1971 São Paulo FC season =

São Paulo
1971 season
- Chairman: Laudo Natel; Henri Couri Aidar
- Manager: Osvaldo Brandão; José Poy
- Campeonato Brasileiro: Runners-up
- Campeonato Paulista: Champions (10th title)
- Top goalscorer: League: Toninho Guerreiro (10); All: Toninho Guerreiro (31)

The 1971 football season was São Paulo's 42nd season since club's existence.

== Statistics ==
=== Scorers ===
Position	Nation	Playing position	Name	Campeonato Brasileiro	Campeonato Paulista	Others	Total
1	(Brazil)	FW	Toninho Guerreiro	10	15	6	31
2	(Brazil)	FW	Terto	7	5	3	15
3	(Uruguay)	MF	Pedro Rocha	0	5	4	9
4	(Brazil)	MF	Édson	0	3	3	6
5	(Brazil)	MF	Gérson	1	3	1	5
=	(Brazil)	FW	Paraná	0	3	2	5
6	(Brazil)	MF	Carlos Alberto	2	0	0	2
=	(Brazil)	FW	Everaldo	2	0	0	2
=	(Uruguay)	DF	Pablo Forlán	1	1	0	2
=	(Brazil)	FW	Zé Roberto	2	0	0	2
7	(Brazil)	FW	Téia	0	1	0	1
=	(Brazil)	MF	Teodoro	1	0	0	1
			Own goals	0	1	0	1
			Total	26	39	19	84

== Overall ==
Games played	60 (22 Campeonato Paulista, 27 Campeonato Brasileiro, 11 Friendly match)
Games won	36 (17 Campeonato Paulista, 10 Campeonato Brasileiro, 8 Friendly match)
Games drawn	13 (2 Campeonato Paulista, 10 Campeonato Brasileiro, 1 Friendly match)
Games lost	11 (3 Campeonato Paulista, 7 Campeonato Brasileiro, 2 Friendly match)
Goals scored	84
Goals conceded	50
Goal difference	+34
Best result	4–1 (H) v Portuguesa - Campeonato Paulista - 1971.06.19; 4–1 (H) v Botafogo - Campeonato Brasileiro - 1971.12.15
Worst result	0–3 (H) v Grêmio - Campeonato Brasileiro - 1971.08.07
Most appearances	Gilberto Sorriso (59)
Top scorer	Toninho Guerreiro (31)

Source: São Paulo FC

== Friendlies ==
Jun 30 National	Fluminense	1–0	São Paulo	São Paulo
	Ivair 79'			Stadium: Estádio Cícero Pompeu de Toledo (Morumbi); Attendance: 34,337; Referee: José Favilli Neto

Jul 10 National	Desportiva	1–2	São Paulo	Cariacica
	Déo 14'		Pedro Rocha 28'; Paraná 44'	Stadium: Estádio Engenheiro Alencar Araripe; Attendance: 4,890; Referee: Jaime Silva

Jul 20 National	Saad	1–1	São Paulo	São Caetano do Sul
	Flávio 75'		Paraná 16'	Stadium: Estádio Lauro Gomes

Jul 25 National	XV de Piracicaba	1–2	São Paulo	Piracicaba
	Pitanga 8'		Toninho Guerreiro 47', 77'	Stadium: Estádio Barão da Serra Negra; Referee: Oscar Scolfaro

Jul 29 National	Catanduvense	0–2	São Paulo	Catanduva
			Pedro Rocha 30'; Toninho Guerreiro 76'	Stadium: Estádio Municipal Sílvio Salles; Referee: Vilmar Serra

Aug 1 National	Noroeste	1–3	São Paulo	Bauru
	Márcio 31'		Terto 27', 36'; Pedro Rocha 55'	Stadium: Estádio Dr. Alfredo de Castilho; Referee: José de Oliveira

=== I Festival de Futebol do São Paulo F.C. ===
Jan 15 International	São Paulo (Brazil)	2–1	(West Germany) Köln	São Paulo
	Édson 55'; Pedro Rocha 67'		Biskup 41'	Stadium: Estádio Cícero Pompeu de Toledo (Morumbi); Referee: Oscar Scolfaro

Jan 25 International	São Paulo (Brazil)	2–1	(Portugal) Sporting	São Paulo
	Toninho Guerreiro 36', 76'		Chico 31'	Stadium: Estádio Cícero Pompeu de Toledo (Morumbi); Referee: Romualdo Arppi Filho

Feb 1 International	São Paulo (Brazil)	0–2	(Bulgaria) CSKA Sofia	São Paulo
			Jekov 32'; Jakinov 43'	Stadium: Estádio Cícero Pompeu de Toledo (Morumbi); Referee: Dulcídio Wanderley Boschilia

Feb 7 International	São Paulo (Brazil)	3–0	(Socialist Federal Republic of Yugoslavia) Vojvodina	São Paulo
	Édson 27', 71'; Terto 77'			Stadium: Estádio Cícero Pompeu de Toledo (Morumbi); Referee: José Favilli Neto

Feb 13 International	São Paulo (Brazil)	2–1	(Romania) Dinamo București	São Paulo
	Gérson 18'; Toninho Guerreiro 44'		Dumitrache 21'	Stadium: Estádio Cícero Pompeu de Toledo (Morumbi); Referee: José de Oliveira

== Official competitions ==
=== Campeonato Paulista ===
Feb 28 Round 1	São Paulo	3–1	Juventus	São Paulo
	Téia 24', 46'; Toninho Guerreiro 27'		Antoninho 31'	Stadium: Estádio Cícero Pompeu de Toledo (Morumbi); Referee: José Favilli Neto

Mar 7 Round 2	Portuguesa	3–2	São Paulo	São Paulo
	Cabinho 12', 54'; Basílio 16'		Forlán 31'; Téia 88'	Stadium: Estádio Municipal Paulo Machado de Carvalho (Pacaembu); Referee: Armando Marques

Mar 12 Round 3	Paulista	2–4	São Paulo	Jundiaí
	Mazinho 79'; Vágner 82'		Édson 49', 75'; Toninho Guerreiro 58', 62'	Stadium: Estádio Dr. Jayme Pinheiro de Ulhoa Cintra; Attendance: 4,036; Referee: Vilmar Serra

Mar 21 Round 4	São Paulo	2–1	Palmeiras	São Paulo
	Pedro Rocha 43', 88'		César 33'	Stadium: Estádio Cícero Pompeu de Toledo (Morumbi); Referee: Armando Marques

Mar 28 Round 5	Ferroviária	1–2	São Paulo	Araraquara
	Lance 15'		Paraná 2'; Toninho Guerreiro 52'	Stadium: Estádio Doutor Adhemar de Barros (Fonte Luminosa); Attendance: 10,362; Referee: Romualdo Arppi Filho

Mar 31 Round 6	São Paulo	1–0	Ponte Preta	São Paulo
	Toninho Guerreiro 70'			Stadium: Estádio Cícero Pompeu de Toledo (Morumbi); Attendance: 15,496; Referee: Aníbal Oviedo

Apr 4 Round 7	Corinthians	1–1	São Paulo	São Paulo
	Mirandinha 4'		Gérson 8'	Stadium: Estádio Cícero Pompeu de Toledo (Morumbi); Referee: Armando Marques

Apr 10 Round 8	São Bento	1–3	São Paulo	Sorocaba
	Adílson 45'		Terto 3'; Toninho Guerreiro 20'; Gérson 51'	Stadium: Estádio Humberto Reale; Attendance: 12,174; Referee: Dulcídio Wanderley Boschilia

Apr 17 Round 9	São Paulo	1–0	Botafogo	São Paulo
	Terto 25'			Stadium: Estádio Cícero Pompeu de Toledo (Morumbi); Attendance: 15,081; Referee: José Favilli Neto

Apr 21 Round 10	Santos	1–0	São Paulo	Santos
	Ferreti 42'			Stadium: Estádio Urbano Caldeira (Vila Belmiro); Attendance: 16,992; Referee: José de Oliveira

Apr 25 Round 11	Guarani	0–1	São Paulo	Campinas
			Toninho Guerreiro 28'	Stadium: Estádio Brinco de Ouro da Princesa; Referee: José Favilli Neto

May 1 Round 12	Juventus	0–1	São Paulo	São Paulo
			Paraná 61'	Stadium: Estádio Municipal Paulo Machado de Carvalho (Pacaembu); Attendance: 1,414; Referee: Aníbal Oviedo

May 8 Round 13	São Paulo	2–0	Guarani	São Paulo
	Paraná 9'; Gérson 34'			Stadium: Estádio Cícero Pompeu de Toledo (Morumbi); Referee: Armando Marques

May 16 Round 14	São Paulo	0–0	Santos	São Paulo
				Stadium: Estádio Cícero Pompeu de Toledo (Morumbi); Referee: Armando Marques

May 23 Round 15	Botafogo	1–2	São Paulo	Ribeirão Preto
	Jackson 52'		Toninho Guerreiro 37'; Jackson 61' (o.g.)	Stadium: Estádio Santa Cruz; Referee: Dulcídio Wanderley Boschilia

May 26 Round 16	São Paulo	3–0	São Bento	São Paulo
	Toninho Guerreiro 32', 78'; Terto 37'			Stadium: Estádio Cícero Pompeu de Toledo (Morumbi); Referee: Carlos Lopes

May 30 Round 17	Ponte Preta	0–1	São Paulo	Campinas
			Toninho Guerreiro 60'	Stadium: Estádio Moisés Lucarelli; Referee: Armando Marques

Jun 2 Round 18	São Paulo	2–1	Ferroviária	São Paulo
	Pedro Rocha 50'; Édson 71'		Zé Luís 34'	Stadium: Estádio Cícero Pompeu de Toledo (Morumbi); Referee: Aníbal Oviedo

Jun 6 Round 19	São Paulo	0–1	Corinthians	São Paulo
			Aladim 55'	Stadium: Estádio Municipal Paulo Machado de Carvalho (Pacaembu); Referee: Armando Marques

Jun 12 Round 20	São Paulo	3–2	Paulista	São Paulo
	Pedro Rocha 26'; Toninho Guerreiro 51', 69'		Xisté 76'; Vágner 79'	Stadium: Estádio Cícero Pompeu de Toledo (Morumbi); Referee: José de Oliveira

Jun 19 Round 21	São Paulo	4–1	Portuguesa	São Paulo
	Toninho Guerreiro 4'; Pedro Rocha 13'; Terto 57', 90'		Dirceu 3'	Stadium: Estádio Cícero Pompeu de Toledo (Morumbi); Referee: Dulcídio Wanderley Boschilia

Jun 27 Final	Palmeiras	0–1	São Paulo	São Paulo
			Toninho Guerreiro 5'	Stadium: Estádio Cícero Pompeu de Toledo (Morumbi); Attendance: 103,887; Referee: Armando Marques

==== Record ====
Final Position	Points	Matches	Wins	Draws	Losses	Goals For	Goals Away	Win%
1st	36	22	17	2	3	39	17	81%

=== Campeonato Brasileiro ===
Aug 7 First stage 1	São Paulo	0–3	Grêmio	São Paulo
			Scotta 10', 81'; Flecha 85'	Stadium: Estádio Cícero Pompeu de Toledo (Morumbi); Referee: Arnaldo César Coelho

Aug 14 First stage 2	Santos	3–1	São Paulo	São Paulo
	Mazinho 55'; Dicá 83'; Edu 84'		Terto 37'	Stadium: Estádio Cícero Pompeu de Toledo (Morumbi); Referee: Dulcídio Wanderley Boschilia

Aug 18 First stage 3	Bahia	0–1	São Paulo	Salvador
			Toninho Guerreiro 54'	Stadium: Estádio Octávio Mangabeira (Fonte Nova); Referee: José Aldo Pereira

Aug 22 First stage 4	Sport	0–0	São Paulo	Recife
				Stadium: Estádio Adelmar da Costa Carvalho (Ilha do Retiro); Referee: José Luís Barreto

Aug 29 First stage 5	São Paulo	0–0	Flamengo	São Paulo
				Stadium: Estádio Cícero Pompeu de Toledo (Morumbi); Referee: José Carlos Morais

Sep 1 First stage 6	Atlético Mineiro	2–0	São Paulo	Belo Horizonte
	Dadá 40', 54'			Stadium: Estádio Governador Magalhães Pinto (Mineirão); Referee: José Marçal Filho

Sep 5 First stage 7	São Paulo	1–1	América-MG	São Paulo
	Zé Roberto 17'		José Carlos 60'	Stadium: Estádio Cícero Pompeu de Toledo (Morumbi); Referee: Carlos Costa

Sep 9 First stage 8	Botafogo	2–1	São Paulo	Rio de Janeiro
	Roberto Miranda 4'; Paulo César 9'		Toninho Guerreiro 51'	Stadium: Estádio Jornalista Mário Filho (Maracanã); Referee: Agomar Martins

Sep 12 First stage 9	São Paulo	2–1	America-RJ	São Paulo
	Terto 27', 63'		Caio 76'	Stadium: Estádio Cícero Pompeu de Toledo (Morumbi); Referee: José Carlos Morais

Sep 18 First stage 10	Vasco da Gama	0–0	São Paulo	Rio de Janeiro
				Stadium: Estádio Jornalista Mário Filho (Maracanã); Referee: José Carlos Morais

Sep 26 First stage 11	São Paulo	1–1	Cruzeiro	São Paulo
	Toninho Guerreiro 3'		Zé Carlos 14'	Stadium: Estádio Cícero Pompeu de Toledo (Morumbi); Referee: Carlos Costa

Oct 3 First stage 12	Ceará	0–1	São Paulo	Fortaleza
			Terto 87'	Stadium: Estádio Presidente Vargas; Referee: Arnaldo César Coelho

Oct 6 First stage 13	São Paulo	1–1	Internacional	São Paulo
	Carlos Alberto 15'		Benê 71'	Stadium: Estádio Cícero Pompeu de Toledo (Morumbi); Referee: Sebastião Rufino

Oct 10 First stage 14	São Paulo	0–1	Portuguesa	São Paulo
			Dirceu 60'	Stadium: Estádio Cícero Pompeu de Toledo (Morumbi); Referee: Dulcídio Wanderley Boschilia

Oct 17 First stage 15	Corinthians	0–2	São Paulo	São Paulo
			Teodoro 70'; Everaldo 74'	Stadium: Estádio Cícero Pompeu de Toledo (Morumbi); Referee: Armando Marques

Oct 24 First stage 16	São Paulo	1–1	Palmeiras	São Paulo
	Everaldo 62'		Luís Pereira 65'	Stadium: Estádio Cícero Pompeu de Toledo (Morumbi); Referee: Oscar Scolfaro

Oct 30 First stage 17	Santa Cruz	0–2	São Paulo	Recife
			Toninho Guerreiro 11'; Zé Roberto 33'	Stadium: Estádio Adelmar da Costa Carvalho (Ilha do Retiro); Referee: Agomar Martins

Nov 6 First stage 18	São Paulo	2–1	Fluminense	São Paulo
	Toninho Guerreiro 11', 64'		Jurandir 3' (o.g.)	Stadium: Estádio Cícero Pompeu de Toledo (Morumbi); Referee: José Morais

Nov 14 First stage 19	Coritiba	2–0	São Paulo	Curitiba
	Hermes 61'; Jurandir 86' (o.g.)			Stadium: Estádio Belfort Duarte; Referee: José Luís Barreto

Nov 21 Second stage 1	São Paulo	1–0	Corinthians	São Paulo
	Toninho Guerreiro 41'			Stadium: Estádio Cícero Pompeu de Toledo (Morumbi); Referee: Armando Marques

Nov 24 Second stage 2	Cruzeiro	0–2	São Paulo	Belo Horizonte
			Gerson 49'; Terto 82'	Stadium: Estádio Governador Magalhães Pinto (Mineirão); Referee: Arnaldo César Coelho

Nov 27 Second stage 3	São Paulo	1–0	America-RJ	São Paulo
	Toninho Guerreiro 60'			Stadium: Estádio Cícero Pompeu de Toledo (Morumbi); Referee: Armando Marques

Dec 1 Second stage 4	São Paulo	1–1	Cruzeiro	São Paulo
	Toninho Guerreiro 50'		Tostão 46'	Stadium: Estádio Cícero Pompeu de Toledo (Morumbi); Referee: Sebastião Rufino

Dec 4 Second stage 5	Corinthians	0–0	São Paulo	São Paulo
				Stadium: Estádio Municipal Paulo Machado de Carvalho (Pacaembu); Referee: José Favilli Neto

Dec 8 Second stage 6	São Paulo	1–1	America-RJ	São Paulo
	Carlos Alberto 23'		Paraguaio 8'	Stadium: Estádio Cícero Pompeu de Toledo (Morumbi); Referee: José Luís Barreto

Dec 12 Final phase 1	Atlético Mineiro	1–0	São Paulo	Belo Horizonte
	Oldair 75'			Stadium: Estádio Governador Magalhães Pinto (Mineirão); Referee: Armando Marques

Dec 15 Final phase 2	São Paulo	4–1	Botafogo	São Paulo
	Forlan 61'; Terto 65', 86'; Toninho Guerreiro 71'		Nei Oliveira 53'	Stadium: Estádio Cícero Pompeu de Toledo (Morumbi); Referee: Armando Marques

==== Record ====
Final Position	Points	Matches	Wins	Draws	Losses	Goals For	Goals Away	Win%
2nd	30	27	10	10	7	26	23	55%
