= 1973 São Paulo FC season =

São Paulo
1973 season
- Chairman: Henri Couri Aidar
- Manager: José Poy
- Campeonato Brasileiro: Runners-up
- Campeonato Paulista: 9th
- Top goalscorer: League: Mirandinha (20); All: Pedro Rocha (21)

The 1973 football season was São Paulo's 44th season since club's existence.

== Statistics ==
=== Scorers ===
Position	Nation	Playing position	Name	Campeonato Paulista	Campeonato Brasileiro	Others	Total
1	(Uruguay)	MF	Pedro Rocha	6	8	7	21
2	(Brazil)	FW	Mirandinha	0	20	0	20
3	(Brazil)	FW	Terto	3	4	1	8
4	(Brazil)	MF	Zé Carlos	4	1	2	7
5	(Brazil)	DF	Gilberto Sorriso	1	1	1	3
=	(Brazil)	FW	Piau	0	3	0	3
=	(Brazil)	FW	Ratinho	0	3	0	3
=	(Brazil)	MF	Silva	0	2	1	3
6	(Brazil)	MF	Chicão	0	2	0	2
=	(Uruguay)	DF	Pablo Forlán	1	0	1	2
=	(Brazil)	FW	Toninho Guerreiro	1	0	1	2
7	(Brazil)	DF	Roberto Dias	0	0	1	1
=	(Brazil)	MF	Édson Cegonha	1	0	0	1
=	(Brazil)	FW	Jésum	0	0	1	1
=	(Brazil)	FW	Paulo Nani	1	0	0	1
=	(Brazil)	FW	Serginho	0	0	1	1
			Own goals	3	2	0	5
			Total	22	46	18	86

=== Overall ===
Games played	81 (22 Campeonato Paulista, 40 Campeonato Brasileiro, 19 Friendly match)
Games won	29 (6 Campeonato Paulista, 17 Campeonato Brasileiro, 6 Friendly match)
Games drawn	36 (9 Campeonato Paulista, 18 Campeonato Brasileiro, 9 Friendly match)
Games lost	16 (7 Campeonato Paulista, 5 Campeonato Brasileiro, 4 Friendly match)
Goals scored	86
Goals conceded	59
Goal difference	+27
Best result	1–3 (A) v Botafogo - Campeonato Paulista - 1973.0.22
Worst result	4–1 (A) v Portuguesa Santista - Friendly match - 1973.03.01; 4–1 (A) v Moto Club - Campeonato Brasileiro - 1973.10.03; 4–1 (H) v Internacional - Campeonato Brasileiro - 1974.02.13
Most appearances	
Top scorer	Pedro Rocha (21)

Source: São Paulo FC

== Friendlies ==
Jan 21 National	Guarani	0–0	São Paulo	Campinas
				Stadium: Estádio Brinco de Ouro da Princesa; Referee: Roberto Nunes Morgado

Jan 25 International	São Paulo (Brazil)	0–1	(Argentina) Independiente	São Paulo
			Hiachello 55'	Stadium: Estádio Cícero Pompeu de Toledo (Morumbi); Attendance: 18,681; Referee: Romualdo Arppi Filho

Jan 27 National	Santos	1–1	São Paulo	Santos
	Alcindo 24'		Zé Carlos 35'	Stadium: Estádio Vila Belmiro; Referee: Wilmar Serra

Feb 4 Taça Prefeitura de Rio Claro	Rio Claro	0–1	São Paulo	Rio Claro
			Pedro Rocha 70'	Stadium: Estádio Doutor Álvaro Perin; Referee: Rubens Paullis

Mar 1 National	Portuguesa Santista	1–4	São Paulo	Santos
	David 84'		Pedro Rocha 4', 78'; Terto 58'; Silva 88'	Stadium: Estádio Ulrico Mursa; Attendance: 3,227; Referee: Rubens Paullis

Mar 4 National	Caldense	0–1	São Paulo	Poços de Caldas
			Jésum 62'	Referee: Joaquim Gonçalves

Mar 31 National	São Paulo	1–1	América-SP	São Paulo
	Toninho Guerreiro 22'		Gilberto 61' (o.g.)	Stadium: Estádio Cícero Pompeu de Toledo (Morumbi); Attendance: 1,769; Referee: Edson Pandozzi

Apr 7 National	Operário	0–0	São Paulo	Campo Grande
				Stadium: Morenão

Jun 6 National	Bahia	0–0	São Paulo	Salvador
				Stadium: Estádio Octávio Mangabeira (Fonte Nova); Referee: Walter Gonçalves

Jun 24 National	Marília	0–2	São Paulo	Marília
			Pedro Rocha 60', 84'	Referee: Antonio Gomes

Jul 1 National	Barretos	0–0	São Paulo	Barretos
				Stadium: Estádio Antônio Gomes Martins; Referee: Alcírio Agostinho

Aug 22 National	União Bandeirante	0–1	São Paulo	Bandeirantes
				Stadium: Vila Maria

=== Torneio Laudo Natel ===
Feb 7 National	Botafogo	1–2	São Paulo	Ribeirão Preto
	Geraldo 68'		Forlán 63'; Zé Carlos 73'	Stadium: Estádio Doutor Francisco de Palma Travassos; Referee: José de Assis Aragão

Feb 10 National	São Paulo	3–2	América	São Paulo
	Pedro Rocha 51'; Dias 58'; Gilberto 73'		Zuza 4'; Xisté 75'	Stadium: Estádio Cícero Pompeu de Toledo (Morumbi); Attendance: 4,639; Referee: Dulcídio Wanderley Boschilia

Feb 24 National	Corinthians	1–0	São Paulo	São Paulo
	Vaguinho 63'			Stadium: Estádio Cícero Pompeu de Toledo (Morumbi); Attendance: 16,455; Referee: José de Assis Aragão

=== Taça Estado de São Paulo ===
May 24 National	Juventus	1–1	São Paulo	São Paulo
	Luiz 76'		Pedro Rocha 74'	Stadium: Estádio Municipal Paulo Machado de Carvalho (Pacaembu); Attendance: 1,057; Referee: José de Assis Aragão

Jun 2 National	São Paulo	0–2	Portuguesa	São Paulo
			Cabinho 10'; Isidoro 24'	Stadium: Estádio Cícero Pompeu de Toledo (Morumbi); Attendance: 4,451; Referee: Roberto Nunes Morgado

Jun 10 National	Corinthians	1–1	São Paulo	São Paulo
	Vaguinho 12'		Serginho 9'	Stadium: Estádio Cícero Pompeu de Toledo (Morumbi); Attendance: 8,899; Referee: José de Assis Aragão

Jun 17 National	Palmeiras	0–0	São Paulo	São Paulo
				Stadium: Estádio Palestra Itália (Parque Antarctica); Attendance: 7,614; Referee: José de Assis Aragão

== Official competitions ==
=== Campeonato Paulista ===
Mar 11 First stage 1	São Paulo	3–1	Ponte Preta	São Paulo
	Pedro Rocha 7'; Marinho 11' (o.g.); Terto 55'		Adílson 9'	Stadium: Estádio Cícero Pompeu de Toledo (Morumbi); Attendance: 12,508; Referee: Dulcídio Wanderley Boschilia

Mar 18 First stage 2	Guarani	1–0	São Paulo	Campinas
	Clayton 37'			Stadium: Estádio Brinco de Ouro da Princesa; Referee: Armando Marques

Mar 21 First stage 3	São Paulo	1–0	América	São Paulo
	Terto 38'			Stadium: Estádio Cícero Pompeu de Toledo (Morumbi); Attendance: 3,862; Referee: Roberto Nunes Morgado

Mar 25 First stage 4	Santos	2–2	São Paulo	São Paulo
	Pelé 7'; Brecha 33'		Paulo 5'; Pedro Rocha 59'	Stadium: Estádio Palestra Itália (Parque Antarctica); Attendance: 33,621; Referee: Oscar Scolfaro

Apr 6 First stage 5	São Paulo	2–0	Ferroviária	São Paulo
	Zé Carlos 4'; Edson 80'			Stadium: Estádio Cícero Pompeu de Toledo (Morumbi); Attendance: 1,569; Referee: Roberto Nunes Morgado

Apr 15 First stage 6	Corinthians	0–0	São Paulo	São Paulo
				Stadium: Estádio Cícero Pompeu de Toledo (Morumbi); Attendance: 40,136; Referee: Armando Marques

Apr 22 First stage 7	Botafogo	3–1	São Paulo	Ribeirão Preto
	Geraldo 41'; Luís 59'; Alexandre 70'		Pedro Rocha 11'	Stadium: Estádio Santa Cruz; Attendance: 9,130; Referee: José de Assis Aragão

May 1 First stage 8	São Paulo	1–1	Juventus	São Paulo
	Roberto Dias 50'		Vanderlei 88'	Stadium: Estádio Cícero Pompeu de Toledo (Morumbi); Attendance: 6,823; Referee: Dulcídio Wanderley Boschilia

May 4 First stage 9	São Paulo	1–0	São Bento	São Paulo
	Zé Carlos 19'			Stadium: Estádio Cícero Pompeu de Toledo (Morumbi); Attendance: 361; Referee: Almir Laguna

May 13 First stage 10	São Paulo	1–1	Portuguesa	São Paulo
	Isidoro 79' (o.g.)		Cabinho 55'	Stadium: Estádio Cícero Pompeu de Toledo (Morumbi); Attendance: 9,207; Referee: Dulcídio Wanderley Boschilia

May 20 First stage 11	Palmeiras	0–0	São Paulo	São Paulo
				Stadium: Estádio Municipal Paulo Machado de Carvalho (Pacaembu); Attendance: 47,268; Referee: Dulcídio Wanderley Boschilia

Jul 5 First stage 12	São Paulo	2–1	Botafogo	São Paulo
	Zé Carlos 34', 56'		Maritaca 77'	Stadium: Estádio Cícero Pompeu de Toledo (Morumbi); Attendance: 666; Referee: Roberto Nunes Morgado

Jul 8 First stage 13	São Paulo	1–1	Guarani	São Paulo
	Toninho Guerreiro 24'		Lola 68'	Stadium: Estádio Cícero Pompeu de Toledo (Morumbi); Attendance: 7,820; Referee: Armando Marques

Jul 11 First stage 14	Portuguesa	1–1	São Paulo	São Paulo
	Enéas 36'		Isidoro 31' (o.g.)	Stadium: Estádio Municipal Paulo Machado de Carvalho (Pacaembu); Attendance: 15,329; Referee: José de Assis Aragão

Jul 15 First stage 15	São Paulo	1–1	Palmeiras	São Paulo
	Forlán 61'		Levinha 14'	Stadium: Estádio Cícero Pompeu de Toledo (Morumbi); Attendance: 19,709; Referee: Arnaldo César Coelho

Jul 21 First stage 16	Ponte Preta	1–0	São Paulo	Campinas
	Tuta 5'			Stadium: Estádio Moisés Lucarelli; Attendance: 7,302; Referee: Dulcídio Wanderley Boschilia

Jul 29 First stage 17	São Paulo	0–0	Santos	São Paulo
				Stadium: Estádio Cícero Pompeu de Toledo (Morumbi); Attendance: 39,836; Referee: Armando Marques

Aug 4 First stage 18	São Paulo	0–1	Juventus	São Paulo
			Vanderlei 68'	Stadium: Estádio Cícero Pompeu de Toledo (Morumbi); Attendance: 4,372; Referee: José Favilli Neto

Aug 9 First stage 19	São Paulo	3–0	São Bento	São Paulo
	Gilberto 14'; Pedro Rocha 58'; Terto 73'			Stadium: Estádio Cícero Pompeu de Toledo (Morumbi); Attendance: 277; Referee: Antônio Gomes

Aug 12 First stage 20	América	2–1	São Paulo	São José do Rio Preto
	Turcão 8'; Iaúca 74'		Pedro Rocha 81'	Stadium: Estádio Mário Alves Mendonça; Referee: Dulcídio Wanderley Boschilia

Aug 15 First stage 21	Ferroviária	1–0	São Paulo	Araraquara
	Coquinho 47'			Stadium: Estádio Doutor Adhemar de Barros (Fonte Luminosa); Referee: José de Assis Aragão

Aug 19 First stage 22	Corinthians	2–1	São Paulo	São Paulo
	Rivellino 52'; Rodrigues 53'		Pedro Rocha 23'	Stadium: Estádio Municipal Paulo Machado de Carvalho (Pacaembu); Attendance: 14,911; Referee: Armando Marques

==== Record ====
Final Position	Points	Matches	Wins	Draws	Losses	Goals For	Goals Away	Win%
9th	21	22	6	9	7	22	20	47%

=== Campeonato Brasileiro ===
Aug 25 First stage 1	Bahia	1–1	São Paulo	Salvador
	Mário 25' (o.g.)		Terto 65'	Stadium: Estádio Octávio Mangabeira (Fonte Nova); Referee: Arnaldo César Coelho

Aug 29 First stage 2	CRB	0–1	São Paulo	Maceió
			Ratinho 84'	Stadium: Estádio Rei Pelé; Attendance: 11,018; Referee: Agomar Martins

Aug 31 First stage 3	Sport	0–3	São Paulo	Recife
			Pedro Rocha 22'; Ratinho 83', 89'	Stadium: Estádio José do Rego Maciel (Arruda); Attendance: 5,996; Referee: Arnaldo César Coelho

Sep 5 First stage 4	Guarani	1–1	São Paulo	Campinas
	Bezerra 15'		Pedro Rocha 12'	Stadium: Estádio Brinco de Ouro da Princesa; Attendance: 9,629; Referee: José de Assis Aragão

Sep 9 First stage 5	Corinthians	1–0	São Paulo	São Paulo
	Marco Antônio 17'			Stadium: Estádio Municipal Paulo Machado de Carvalho (Pacaembu); Referee: Dulcídio Wanderley Boschilia

Sep 12 First stage 6	São Paulo	1–0	América-MG	São Paulo
	Terto 30'			Stadium: Estádio Cícero Pompeu de Toledo (Morumbi); Attendance: 2,790; Referee: Agomar Martins

Sep 16 First stage 7	Fortaleza	0–0	São Paulo	Fortaleza
				Stadium: Estádio Presidente Vargas; Attendance: 10,956; Referee: Armando Marques

Sep 23 First stage 8	São Paulo	2–2	Fluminense	São Paulo
	Pedro Rocha 37'; Mirandinha 77'		Manfrini 12', 15'	Stadium: Estádio Cícero Pompeu de Toledo (Morumbi); Referee: José Luís Barreto

Sep 26 First stage 9	CEUB	0–0	São Paulo	Brasília
				Stadium: Estádio Edson Arantes do Nascimento (Pelezão); Attendance: 7,000; Referee: José Marçal Filho

Sep 30 First stage 10	Botafogo	1–0	São Paulo	Rio de Janeiro
	Fischer 79'			Stadium: Estádio Jornalista Mário Filho (Maracanã); Attendance: 28,330; Referee: José Carlos Morais

Oct 3 First stage 11	Moto Club	1–4	São Paulo	São Luís
	Agnaldo 75'		Piau 28'; Pedro Rocha 40', 69'; Mirandinha 82'	Stadium: Estádio Municipal Nhozinho Santos; Attendance: 9,364; Referee: Arnaldo César Coelho

Oct 7 First stage 12	Tiradentes	0–2	São Paulo	Teresina
			Gilberto 33'; Mirandinha 44'	Stadium: Estádio Governador Alberto Tavares Silva (Albertão); Attendance: 21,816; Referee: Armando Marques

Oct 14 First stage 13	São Paulo	2–1	Cruzeiro	São Paulo
	Chicão 26'; Mirandinha 86'		Palhinha 73'	Stadium: Estádio Cícero Pompeu de Toledo (Morumbi); Attendance: 26,115; Referee: Agomar Martins

Oct 17 First stage 14	Figueirense	0–1	São Paulo	Florianópolis
			Pedro Rocha 21'	Stadium: Estádio Orlando Scarpelli; Referee: Armando Marques

Oct 21 First stage 15	Internacional	2–2	São Paulo	Porto Alegre
	Escurinho 22'; Carpegiani		Mirandinha 15', 72'	Stadium: Estádio José Pinheiro Borda (Beira-Rio); Referee: Arnaldo César Coelho

Oct 24 First stage 16	Paysandu	0–2	São Paulo	Belém
			Mirandinha 11', 78'	Stadium: Estádio Evandro Almeida (Baenão); Referee: Romualdo Arppi Filho

Oct 27 First stage 17	São Paulo	0–0	Nacional-AM	São Paulo
				Stadium: Estádio Cícero Pompeu de Toledo (Morumbi); Referee: Agomar Martins

Oct 31 First stage 18	America-RJ	0–0	São Paulo	Rio de Janeiro
				Stadium: Estádio Vasco da Gama (São Januário); Attendance: 1,336; Referee: Armando Marques

Nov 3 First stage 19	São Paulo	0–0	Coritiba	São Paulo
				Stadium: Estádio Cícero Pompeu de Toledo (Morumbi); Attendance: 14,519; Referee: Maurício Santiago

Nov 10 First stage 20	São Paulo	2–2	Coritiba	São Paulo
	Mirandinha 50'; Pedro Rocha 65'		Zé Roberto 60'; Sérgio Roberto 81'	Stadium: Estádio Cícero Pompeu de Toledo (Morumbi); Attendance: 12,168; Referee: José Luís Barreto

Nov 14 First stage 21	São Paulo	1–1	Portuguesa	São Paulo
	Mirandinha 31'		Tatá 4'	Stadium: Estádio Cícero Pompeu de Toledo (Morumbi); Referee: Oscar Scolfaro

Nov 18 First stage 22	Internacional	1–2	São Paulo	Porto Alegre
	Valdomiro 32'		Zé Carlos 33', 59'	Stadium: Estádio José Pinheiro Borda (Beira-Rio); Referee: José Marçalo Filho

Nov 25 First stage 23	Palmeiras	1–2	São Paulo	São Paulo
	Leivinha 64		Mirandinha 5', 43'	Stadium: Estádio Cícero Pompeu de Toledo (Morumbi); Attendance: 63,411; Referee: José Favilli Neto

Nov 28 First stage 24	São Paulo	0–0	Grêmio	São Paulo
				Stadium: Estádio Cícero Pompeu de Toledo (Morumbi); Referee: José Aldo Pereira

Dec 2 First stage 25	Corinthians	0–0	São Paulo	São Paulo
				Stadium: Estádio Cícero Pompeu de Toledo (Morumbi); Attendance: 59,130; Referee: Arnaldo César Coelho

Dec 8 First stage 26	Atlético Paranaense	0–0	São Paulo	Curitiba
				Stadium: Estádio Belfort Duarte; Referee: Luís Carlos Félix

Dec 12 First stage 27	Guarani	0–0	São Paulo	Campinas
				Stadium: Estádio Brinco de Ouro da Princesa; Referee: José de Assis Aragão

Dec 17 First stage 28	Santos	1–0	São Paulo	São Paulo
	Pelé 55'			Stadium: Estádio Cícero Pompeu de Toledo (Morumbi); Attendance: 30,000; Referee: Dulcídio Wanderley Boschilia

Jan 13, 1974 Second stage 1	Goiás	2–2	São Paulo	Goiânia
	Lincoln 38', 65'		Terto 30'; Piau 90'	Stadium: Estádio Olímpico Pedro Ludovico; Attendance: 9,412; Referee: Silvio Acácio Silveira

Jan 20, 1974 Second stage 2	São Paulo	1–0	Grêmio	São Paulo
	Ancheta 26' (o.g.)			Stadium: Estádio Cícero Pompeu de Toledo (Morumbi); Attendance: 2,790; Referee: Agomar Martins

Jan 23, 1974 Second stage 3	São Paulo	3–0	Guarani	São Paulo
	Mirandinha 9', 40', 62'			Stadium: Estádio Municipal Paulo Machado de Carvalho (Pacaembu); Referee: Dulcídio Wanderley Boschilia

Jan 26, 1974 Second stage 4	Santa Cruz	0–2	São Paulo	Recife
			Mirandinha 59'; Terto 69'	Stadium: Estádio José do Rego Maciel (Arruda); Attendance: 13,677; Referee: Arnaldo César Coelho

Jan 29, 1974 Second stage 5	Santos	1–2	São Paulo	São Paulo
	Pelé 11'		Silva 57'; Mirandinha 75'	Stadium: Estádio Cícero Pompeu de Toledo (Morumbi); Attendance: 41,902; Referee: Armando Marques

Jan 31, 1974 Second stage 6	São Paulo	1–0	Fortaleza	São Paulo
	Chicão 53'			Stadium: Estádio Municipal Paulo Machado de Carvalho (Pacaembu); Attendance: 33,361; Referee: José Luís Barreto

Feb 3, 1974 Second stage 7	Cruzeiro	1–0	São Paulo	Belo Horizonte
	Dirceu Lopes 54'			Stadium: Estádio Governador Magalhães Pinto (Mineirão); Attendance: 40,006; Referee: Arnaldo César Coelho

Feb 6, 1974 Second stage 8	Vitória	0–2	São Paulo	Salvador
			Silva 18'; Mirandinha 60'	Stadium: Estádio Octávio Mangabeira (Fonte Nova); Attendance: 10,210; Referee: José Marçal Filho

Feb 9, 1974 Second stage 9	São Paulo	0–0	Botafogo	São Paulo
				Stadium: Estádio Cícero Pompeu de Toledo (Morumbi); Referee: José Luís Barreto

Feb 13, 1974 Final stage 1	São Paulo	4–1	Internacional	São Paulo
	Mirandinha 19', 80'; Pedro Rocha 20'; Piau 36'		Claudiomiro 56'	Stadium: Estádio Cícero Pompeu de Toledo (Morumbi); Attendance: 37,439; Referee: Armando Marques

Feb 17, 1974 Final stage 2	Cruzeiro	1–0	São Paulo	Belo Horizonte
	Palhinha 47'			Stadium: Estádio Governador Magalhães Pinto (Mineirão); Attendance: 31,788; Referee: Armando Marques

Feb 20, 1974 Final stage 3	Palmeiras	0–0	São Paulo	São Paulo
				Stadium: Estádio Cícero Pompeu de Toledo (Morumbi); Attendance: 66,549; Referee: Arnaldo César Coelho

==== Record ====
Final Position	Points	Matches	Wins	Draws	Losses	Goals For	Goals Away	Win%
2nd	52	40	17	18	5	46	22	65%
