= 1969 São Paulo FC season =

São Paulo
1969 season
- Chairman: Laudo Natel
- Manager: Diede Lameiro
- Torneio Roberto Gomes Pedrosa: Group stage
- Campeonato Paulista: Final round
- Top goalscorer: Zé Roberto (27)

The 1969 football season was São Paulo's 40th season since club's existence.

== Statistics ==
=== Scorers ===
| Position | Nation | Playing position | Name | Torneio Roberto Gomes Pedrosa | Campeonato Paulista | Others | Total |
|---|---|---|---|---|---|---|---|
| 1 | (Brazil) | FW | Zé Roberto | 5 | 14 | 8 | 27 |
| 2 | (Brazil) | | Babá | 2 | 11 | 8 | 21 |
| 3 | (Brazil) | | Téia | 3 | 9 | 3 | 15 |
| 4 | (Brazil) | | Paraná | 1 | 6 | 1 | 8 |
| 5 | (Brazil) | | Nenê | 2 | 0 | 3 | 5 |
| 6 | (Brazil) | | Gérson | 3 | 0 | 1 | 4 |
| = | (Brazil) | | Toninho Guerreiro | 3 | 0 | 1 | 4 |
| 7 | (Brazil) | | Miruca | 0 | 1 | 2 | 3 |
| = | (Brazil) | | Nelsinho | 0 | 0 | 3 | 3 |
| = | (Brazil) | | Valter | 0 | 3 | 0 | 3 |
| 8 | (Brazil) | | Benê | 0 | 0 | 2 | 2 |
| = | (Brazil) | | Dias | 1 | 0 | 1 | 2 |
| 9 | (Brazil) | | Carlos Alberto | 0 | 1 | 0 | 1 |
| = | (Brazil) | | Édson | 0 | 0 | 1 | 1 |
| = | (Brazil) | | Lourival | 0 | 1 | 0 | 1 |
| = | (Brazil) | | Tenente | 0 | 0 | 1 | 1 |
| = | (Brazil) | | Terto | 1 | 0 | 0 | 1 |
| = | | | Own Goals | 1 | 1 | 1 | 3 |
| | | | Total | 22 | 47 | 35 | 104 |

== Overall ==
| Games played | 65 (29 Campeonato Paulista, 16 Torneio Roberto Gomes Pedrosa, 20 Friendly match) |
| Games won | 34 (17 Campeonato Paulista, 5 Torneio Roberto Gomes Pedrosa, 12 Friendly match) |
| Games drawn | 10 (3 Campeonato Paulista, 4 Torneio Roberto Gomes Pedrosa, 3 Friendly match) |
| Games lost | 21 (9 Campeonato Paulista, 7 Torneio Roberto Gomes Pedrosa, 5 Friendly match) |
| Goals scored | 104 |
| Goals conceded | 86 |
| Goal difference | +18 |
| Best result | 4–1 (H) v Guarani - Campeonato Paulista - 1969.02.02; 4–1 (H) v São Bento - Campeonato Paulista - 1969.02.26; 4–1 (H) v Flamengo - Torneio Roberto Gomes Pedrosa - 1969.11.19 |
| Worst result | 0–4 (A) v Valencia - Friendly match - 1969.06.29; 0–4 (A) v America-RJ - Torneio Roberto Gomes Pedrosa - 1969.11.26 |
| Most appearances | Cláudio Deodato (62) |
| Top scorer | Zé Roberto (27) |

Source: São Paulo FC

== Friendlies ==
| Jan 12 National | Atlético Mineiro | 1–3 | São Paulo | Belo Horizonte |
| | Ronaldo 63' | | Nenê 3'; Téia 69', 83' | Stadium: Estádio Governador Magalhães Pinto (Mineirão); Referee: Dagomir Sacramento |

| Jan 18 National | Portuguesa Santista | 0–3 | São Paulo | Santos |
| | | | Nelsinho 15'; Paraná 35'; Zé Roberto 55' | Stadium: Estádio Ulrico Mursa; Referee: Albino Zanferrari |

| Jan 25 International | São Paulo (Brazil) | 2–2 | Hungary | São Paulo |
| | Babá 48'; Tenente 82' | | Farakas 1'; Bene 56' | Stadium: Estádio Cícero Pompeu de Toledo (Morumbi); Attendance: 8,090; Referee: José Favile Neto |

| Jul 9 International | Solna Municipality XI (Sweden) | 2–3 | (Brazil) São Paulo | Solna |
| | Olsson 86'; Cronquist 88' | | Babá 15'; Zé Roberto 35', 75' | Stadium: Rasunda Stadium; Attendance: 7,648; Referee: Aake Benermo |

| Jul 27 International | Crvena Zvezda (Socialist Federal Republic of Yugoslavia) | 0–3 | (Brazil) São Paulo | Belgrade |
| | | | Benê 49'; Babá 75'; Zé Roberto 89' | Stadium: Stadion FK Crvena Zvezda (Marakana); Attendance: 20,000; Referee: Milan Butic |

| Jul 30 International | Željezničar (Socialist Federal Republic of Yugoslavia) | 1–1 | (Brazil) São Paulo | Sarajevo |
| | Mujkic 64' | | Benê 59' | Attendance: 15,000 |

| Aug 3 International | Universitatea Craiova (Romania) | 0–1 | (Brazil) São Paulo | Craiova |
| | | | Téia 37' | Stadium: Stadionul Central |

| Aug 6 International | Rapid București (Romania) | 0–1 | (Brazil) São Paulo | Bucharest |
| | | | Miruca 77' | Stadium: Stadionul Giulești; Referee: Lemora |

| Aug 10 International | Farul Constanţa (Romania) | 2–1 | (Brazil) São Paulo | Constanţa |
| | Kallo 48', 80' | | Édson 62' | Stadium: Stadionul Farul; Referee: Nicolar Petriceanu |

| Aug 12 International | Bulgaria | 4–1 | (Brazil) São Paulo | Sofia |
| | Georgi Asparuhov 6', 71'; Hristo Bonev 22', 87' | | Sili 42' (o.g.) | Stadium: Narodna Armia (Balgarska Armia) |

| Aug 15 International | Etar (Bulgaria) | 2–0 | (Brazil) São Paulo | Veliko Tarnovo |
| | Varbonov 55'; Zenov 82' | | | Stadium: Stadion Ivaylo; Attendance: 11 000; Referee: Chomavoc |

| Aug 27 International | Real Madrid (Spain) | 1–2 | (Brazil) São Paulo | Madrid |
| | Goal | | Zé Roberto; Nelsinho | Stadium: Estadio Santiago Bernabéu |

| Nov 30 National | Francana | 0–0 | São Paulo | Lanchão |

| Dez 6 International | São Paulo (Brazil) | 4–2 | Ghana | São Paulo |
| | Gérson 4'; Toninho Guerreiro 11'; Nenê 81'; Zé Roberto 89' | | Ownso 40'; Aguadze 65' | Stadium: Estádio Cícero Pompeu de Toledo (Morumbi); Referee: Albino Zanferrari |

=== Troféo Bodas de Oro ===
Friendly tournament played in June 1969 to commemorate the first 50 years of Valencia CF.

| Jun 28 International | Eintracht Frankfurt (West Germany) | 0–2 | (Brazil) São Paulo | Valencia |
| | | | Babá 35'; Zé Roberto 70' | Stadium: Estadio Luís Casanova (Mestalla); Referee: Francisco Davi |

| Jun 29 International | Valencia (Spain) | 4–0 | (Brazil) São Paulo | Valencia |
| | Ansola 13', 21', 88'; Paquito 85' | | | Stadium: Estadio Luís Casanova (Mestalla); Referee: Francisco Carlos |

=== Troféo Colombino ===
| Aug 23 International | Las Palmas (Spain) | 2–3 | (Brazil) São Paulo | Hueva |
| | German 27', 71' | | Zé Roberto 2'; Babá 26'; Nelsinho 86' | Stadium: Estadio Hueva |

| Aug 24 International | Real Madrid (Spain) | 1–2 | (Brazil) São Paulo | Hueva |
| | Goal | | Nenê; Babá | Stadium: Estadio Hueva |

=== Tournoi Mohammed V ===
| Aug 30 International | Barcelona (Spain) | 2–0 | (Brazil) São Paulo | Casablanca |
| | Rosello 72'; Pelicea 90' | | | Stadium: Stade D'honneur (Mohamed V) |

| Aug 31 International | Wydad Casablanca (Morocco) | 0–3 | (Brazil) São Paulo | Casablanca |
| | | | Miruca 10'; Babá 18', 87' | Stadium: Stade D'honneur (Mohamed V); Referee: Mohandi |

== Official competitions ==
=== Campeonato Paulista ===
| Feb 2 First stage 1 | São Paulo | 4–1 | Guarani | São Paulo |
| | Zé Roberto 13', 28'; Miruca 20'; Babá 65' | | Vanderlei 66' | Stadium: Estádio Cícero Pompeu de Toledo (Morumbi); Attendance: 8 090; Referee: Roberto Goicochea |

| Feb 9 First stage 2 | XV de Piracicaba | 1–0 | São Paulo | Piracicaba |
| | Jair 61' | | | Stadium: Estádio Barão da Serra Negra; Attendance: 11 995; Referee: José de Oliveira |

| Feb 23 First stage 3 | São Paulo | 3–1 | Palmeiras | São Paulo |
| | Valter 1', 81'; Zé Roberto 61' | | Ademir da Guia 70' | Stadium: Estádio Cícero Pompeu de Toledo (Morumbi); Attendance: 22 925; Referee: Roberto Goicochea |

| Feb 26 First stage 4 | São Bento | 1–4 | São Paulo | Sorocaba |
| | Bazzaninho 44' | | Zé Roberto 1', 67'; Carlos Alberto 10'; Babá 63' | Stadium: Estádio Humberto Reale; Referee: José Favilli Neto |

| Mar 2 First stage 5 | São Paulo | 2–4 | Corinthians | São Paulo |
| | Paraná 6'; Valter 36' | | Tales 17'; Benê 27', 90'; Paulo Borges 58' | Stadium: Estádio Cícero Pompeu de Toledo (Morumbi); Attendance: 47 904; Referee: José Favilli Neto |

| Mar 5 First stage 6 | Portuguesa Santista | 2–2 | São Paulo | Santos |
| | Zico 44'; Sergio 51' | | Babá 16', 91' | Stadium: Estádio Ulrico Mursa; Attendance: 5 274; Referee: Dulcídio Wanderley Boschilia |

| Mar 9 First stage 7 | São Paulo | 0–3 | Santos | São Paulo |
| | | | Pelé 17'; Edu 19'; Jurandir 26' (o.g.) | Stadium: Estádio Cícero Pompeu de Toledo (Morumbi); Attendance: 27 768; Referee: Roberto Goicochea |

| Mar 16 First stage 8 | América | 1–2 | São Paulo | São José do Rio Preto |
| | Cabinho 90' | | Babá 66'; Paraná 84' | Stadium: Estádio Mário Alves Mendonça; Attendance: 6 601; Referee: Wilmar Serra |

| Mar 19 First stage 9 | Ferroviária | 1–0 | São Paulo | Araraquara |
| | Ismael 66' | | | Stadium: Estádio Doutor Adhemar de Barros (Fonte Luminosa); Attendance: 7 562; Referee: Albino Zanferrari |

| Mar 23 First stage 10 | São Paulo | 2–0 | Portuguesa | São Paulo |
| | Zé Roberto 63'; Paraná 82' | | | Stadium: Estádio Cícero Pompeu de Toledo (Morumbi); Attendance: 6 621; Referee: José de Oliveira |

| Mar 30 First stage 11 | Paulista | 0–0 | São Paulo | Jundiaí |
| | | | | Stadium: Estádio Dr. Jayme Pinheiro de Ulhoa Cintra; Attendance: 7 480; Referee: Joaquim Campos |

| Apr 12 First stage 12 | São Paulo | 2–1 | Juventus | São Paulo |
| | Zé Roberto 38'; Babá 55' | | Antoninho 5' | Stadium: Estádio Cícero Pompeu de Toledo (Morumbi); Referee: Roberto Goicochea |

| Apr 16 First stage 13 | Botafogo | 0–2 | São Paulo | Ribeirão Preto |
| | | | Zé Roberto 59'; Babá 81' | Stadium: Estádio Santa Cruz; Referee: Roberto Goicochea |

| Apr 20 First stage 14 | São Paulo | 2–0 | Portuguesa Santista | São Paulo |
| | Babá 15'; Zé Roberto 51' | | | Stadium: Estádio Cícero Pompeu de Toledo (Morumbi); Attendance: 3 647; Referee: Emídio Marques de Mesquita |

| Apr 27 First stage 15 | Palmeiras | 3–0 | São Paulo | São Paulo |
| | Artime 12', 71'; Ademir da Guia 30' | | | Stadium: Estádio Palestra Itália (Parque Antarctica) |

| May 1 First stage 16 | Juventus | 1–2 | São Paulo | São Paulo |
| | Luizinho 33' | | Carlos 7' (o.g.); Téia 45' | Stadium: Estádio Conde Rodolfo Crespi (Rua Javari); Attendance: 5 788; Referee: Joaquim Campos |

| May 4 First stage 17 | São Paulo | 3–1 | São Bento | São Paulo |
| | Paraná 19'; Téia 46', 52' | | Batista 40' | Stadium: Estádio Cícero Pompeu de Toledo (Morumbi); Referee: José Favilli Neto |

| May 7 First stage 18 | Portuguesa | 0–1 | São Paulo | São Paulo |
| | | | Téia 73' | Stadium: Estádio Palestra Itália (Parque Antarctica); Attendance: 5 406; Referee: José Favilli Neto |

| May 10 First stage 19 | São Paulo | 3–1 | XV de Piracicaba | São Paulo |
| | Zé Roberto 38', 62'; Babá 89' | | Nicanor 3' | Stadium: Estádio Cícero Pompeu de Toledo (Morumbi); Attendance: 6 656; Referee: Vander Moreira |

| May 14 First stage 20 | São Paulo | 2–1 | Botafogo | São Paulo |
| | Zé Roberto 8'; Téia 81' | | Luis 15' | Stadium: Estádio Cícero Pompeu de Toledo (Morumbi); Attendance: 2 945; Referee: Albino Zanferrari |

| May 18 First stage 21 | São Paulo | 3–0 | Ferroviária | São Paulo |
| | Paraná 14'; Téia 27', 67' | | | Stadium: Estádio Cícero Pompeu de Toledo (Morumbi); Attendance: 10 574; Referee: José de Oliveira |

| May 21 First stage 22 | Santos | 1–0 | São Paulo | Santos |
| | Edu 70' | | | Stadium: Estádio Urbano Caldeira (Vila Belmiro); Referee: José Favilli Neto |

| May 24 First stage 23 | São Paulo | 1–3 | América | São Paulo |
| | Babá 13' | | Mirandinha 25'; Cabinho 77'; Tião 80' | Stadium: Estádio Cícero Pompeu de Toledo (Morumbi); Attendance: 2 804; Referee: Oscar Scolfaro |

| May 28 First stage 24 | Guarani | 1–0 | São Paulo | Campinas |
| | Ladeira 49' | | | Stadium: Estádio Brinco de Ouro da Princesa; Referee: Alcir Sanchez |

| Jun 1 First stage 25 | Corinthians | 0–2 | São Paulo | São Paulo |
| | | | Zé Roberto 41'; Paraná 47' | Stadium: Estádio Cícero Pompeu de Toledo (Morumbi); Attendance: 13 704; Referee: Roberto Goicochea |

| Jun 5 First stage 26 | São Paulo | 2–1 | Paulista | São Paulo |
| | Babá 16'; Lourival 28' | | Zé Luis 83' | Stadium: Estádio Cícero Pompeu de Toledo (Morumbi); Attendance: 3 973; Referee: Oscar Scolfaro |

| Jun 11 Final stage 1 | Palmeiras | 1–0 | São Paulo | São Paulo |
| | Dudu 56' | | | Stadium: Estádio Palestra Itália (Parque Antarctica); Attendance: 37 682; Referee: José Favilli Neto |

| Jun 15 Final stage 2 | Corinthians | 2–3 | São Paulo | São Paulo |
| | Rivellino 12'; Benê 84' | | Zé Roberto 16'; Téia 48', 87' | Stadium: Estádio Cícero Pompeu de Toledo (Morumbi); Attendance: 14 115; Referee: Joaquim Campos |

| Jun 21 Final stage 3 | São Paulo | 0–0 | Santos | São Paulo |
| | | | | Stadium: Estádio Cícero Pompeu de Toledo (Morumbi); Attendance: 31 999; Referee: Joaquim Campos |

==== Record ====
| Final Position | Points | Matches | Wins | Draws | Losses | Goals For | Goals Away | Win% |
|---|---|---|---|---|---|---|---|---|
| 3rd | 37 | 29 | 17 | 3 | 9 | 47 | 32 | 63% |

=== Torneio Roberto Gomes Pedrosa ===
| Sep 14 First stage 1 | Coritiba | 2–1 | São Paulo | Curitiba |
| | Kosilek 33'; Miranda 50' | | Babá 8' | Stadium: Estádio Belfort Duarte; Referee: José Vinhas |

| Sep 21 First stage 2 | São Paulo | 2–5 | Atlético Mineiro | São Paulo |
| | Gérson 45', 88' | | Ronaldo 23'; Dario 44'; Oldair 72'; Vaguinho 74', 75' | Stadium: Estádio Cícero Pompeu de Toledo (Morumbi); Attendance: 37,598; Referee: Aírton de Morais |

| Oct 1 First stage 3 | São Paulo | 0–2 | Corinthians | São Paulo |
| | | | Paulo Borges 5'; Ivair 54' | Stadium: Estádio Municipal Paulo Machado de Carvalho (Pacaembu); Attendance: 24,199; Referee: Oscar Scolfaro |

| Oct 8 First stage 4 | Botafogo | 1–0 | São Paulo | Rio de Janeiro |
| | Roberto 32' | | | Stadium: Estádio Jornalista Mário Filho (Maracanã); Attendance: 15,155; Referee: Agomar Martins |

| Oct 12 First stage 5 | Bahia | 2–3 | São Paulo | Salvador |
| | Carlinhos 17', 89' | | Terto 27'; Téia 44', 49' | Stadium: Estádio Octávio Mangabeira (Fonte Nova); Referee: Amílcar Ferreira |

| Oct 15 First stage 6 | Santa Cruz | 1–1 | São Paulo | Recife |
| | Luciano 44' | | Téia 53' | Stadium: Estádio Adelmar da Costa Carvalho (Ilha do Retiro); Referee: José Assis Aragão |

| Oct 18 First stage 7 | São Paulo | 1–2 | Portuguesa | São Paulo |
| | Nenê 36' | | Marinho 37'; Tatá 39' | Stadium: Estádio Municipal Paulo Machado de Carvalho (Pacaembu); Attendance: 10,152; Referee: Arnaldo Cézar Coelho |

| Oct 22 First stage 8 | São Paulo | 1–0 | Fluminense | São Paulo |
| | Zé Roberto 42' | | | Stadium: Estádio Palestra Itália (Parque Antarctica); Referee: Sebastião Rufino |

| Oct 26 First stage 9 | Cruzeiro | 2–0 | São Paulo | Belo Horizonte |
| | Dirceu Lopes 70'; Gilberto 87' | | | Stadium: Estádio Governador Magalhães Pinto (Mineirão); Attendance: 15,537; Referee: Arnaldo Cézar Coelho |

| Nov 2 First stage 10 | São Paulo | 2–2 | Grêmio | São Paulo |
| | Zé Roberto 19', 34' | | Alcindo 37', 45' | Stadium: Estádio Cícero Pompeu de Toledo (Morumbi); Referee: Arnaldo Cézar Coelho |

| Nov 5 First stage 11 | Palmeiras | 1–2 | São Paulo | São Paulo |
| | Jaime 46' | | Babá 7'; Dias 79' | Stadium: Estádio Palestra Itália (Parque Antarctica); Attendance: 9,344; Referee: Armando Marques |

| Nov 9 First stage 12 | São Paulo | 1–1 | Santos | São Paulo |
| | Nenê 87' | | Rildo 65' | Stadium: Estádio Cícero Pompeu de Toledo (Morumbi); Referee: José Barreto |

| Nov 16 First stage 13 | São Paulo | 3–0 | Vasco da Gama | São Paulo |
| | Toninho Guerreiro 35'; Paraná 37'; Fernando 60' (o.g.) | | | Stadium: Estádio Cícero Pompeu de Toledo (Morumbi); Referee: Luís Cavalheiro |

| Nov 19 First stage 14 | São Paulo | 4–1 | Flamengo | São Paulo |
| | Zé Roberto 22', 65'; Toninho Guerreiro 67', 88' | | Nei 43' | Stadium: Estádio Palestra Itália (Parque Antarctica); Attendance: 2,336; Referee: Joaquim Gonçalves |

| Nov 23 First stage 15 | Internacional | 1–1 | São Paulo | Porto Alegre |
| | Edson 86' | | Gérson 88' | Stadium: Estádio José Pinheiro Borba (Beira-Rio); Attendance: 26,614; Referee: Aírton de Morais |

| Nov 26 First stage 16 | America-RJ | 4–0 | São Paulo | Rio de Janeiro |
| | Edu 69', 72', 87'; Suquinha 76' | | | Stadium: Estádio General Severiano; Attendance: 1,786; Referee: Sílvio David |

==== Record ====
| Final Position | Points | Matches | Wins | Draws | Losses | Goals For | Goals Away | Win% |
|---|---|---|---|---|---|---|---|---|
| 13th | 14 | 16 | 5 | 4 | 7 | 22 | 27 | 43% |
