= Ernesto Lance =

Brazilian footballer

Lance
Personal information
- Full name: Ernesto Luís Lance
- Date of birth: 19 January 1949 (age 77)
- Place of birth: Casa Branca, Brazil
- Position: Forward

Youth career
- Corinthians (Casa Branca)

Senior career*
| Years | Team | Apps | (Gls) |
| 1967 | América-SP | | |
| 1968 | São Carlos Clube | | |
| 1969–1971 | Ferroviária | | |
| 1971–1977 | Corinthians | 211 | (38) |
| 1978 | Coritiba | | |
| 1979 | São Bento | | |
| 1979–1980 | Atlético Paranaense | | |
| 1981 | Coritiba | | |
| 1981 | Santo André | | |
- * Club domestic league appearances and goals as of 21 February 2024

Ernesto Luís Lance (born 19 January 1949), is a Brazilian former professional footballer who played as a forward.

== Career ==
Ambisright, Ernesto began his career with the nickname "Pio". Upon arriving at Ferroviária, in the presence of another player (Osmar Alberto Volpe) with the same nickname, he began to adopt Lance. In 1971 he scored 15 goals in the Campeonato Paulista, arousing the interest of Corinthians, a team that played 211 matches and remained until 1977, being one of the players on the squad that ended the title drought.

On 8 February 1975, after Corinthians lost 4–1 to Fluminense, Lance was accused by referee José Roberto Wright of punching him in the face. Even with most of the witnesses denying the fact, Lance was suspended from football for a year. He also played for Coritiba, São Bento, Athletico Paranaense and Santo André before retiring.

== Personal life ==
Lance almost lost his life in a car accident in 2014, in São João da Boa Vista. He had more than 12 fractures throughout his body and spent a year to fully rehabilitate. His brother-in-law died in the accident.

== Honours ==
Corinthians

- Campeonato Paulista: 1977
- Torneio Laudo Natel: 1975

Santo André

- Campeonato Paulista Série A2: 1981
