= Tata (footballer, born 1953) =

Brazilian footballer (1953–2022)

Personal information
- Full name: Mário Felipe Perez
- Date of birth: 3 October 1953
- Place of birth: São José dos Campos, Brazil
- Date of death: 9 February 2022 (aged 68)
- Place of death: São Paulo, Brazil
- Position: Midfielder

Senior career*
Years	Team	Apps	(Gls)
1974–1975	Juventus-SP		
1976	Santos	26	(7)
1977–1979	Portuguesa		
1979–1983	São José-SP		
1984–1986	Paulista		
1986–1987	São José-SP		

Managerial career
- 1988: São José-SP (assistant)
- 1989–1990: Palmeiras (assistant)
- 1990: São José-SP (assistant)
- 1990: São José-SP
- 1993: Paysandu
- 1994: Remo
- 1994–1995: Paysandu
- 1995–1996: São José-SP
- 1996: Moto Club
- 1997: Santo André
- 1997: Paysandu
- 1998: Moto Club
- 1999: Vila Nova
- 2000-2001: Portuguesa Santista (assistant)
- 2001: Náutico (assistant)
- 2001: Santa Cruz (assistant)
- 2002: Náutico (assistant)
- 2002: Figueirense (assistant)
- 2003: Internacional (assistant)
- 2004: São Caetano (assistant)
- 2004–2005: Internacional (assistant)
- 2006–2009: São Paulo (assistant)
- 2009–2010: Palmeiras (assistant)
- 2010–2011: Fluminense (assistant)
- 2011–2013: Santos (assistant)
- 2013–2015: São Paulo (assistant)
- 2016: Flamengo (assistant)
- * Club domestic league appearances and goals

Mário Felipe Perez (3 October 1953 – 9 February 2022), better known as Tata, was a Brazilian professional football player and manager who played as a midfielder.

== Playing career ==
As a player, Tata played as a midfielder, and spent his career with teams in São Paulo. With Santos FC, did 26 appearances and scored 7 goals in 1976. For São José, his hometown club, Tata played 232 games and scored 53 goals.

== Managerial career ==
Started his managerial career being assistant of Vail Mota at São José in 1988, and with Émerson Leão at Palmeiras in 1989. Returned to São José in 1990 with Leão, and took over as coach definitively. In 1994, he had a great campaign with Paysandu in the Campeonato Brasileiro Série A.

== Partnership with Muricy Ramalho ==
Tata reached his peak in Brazilian football as Muricy Ramalho's main assistant, starting in 1999 when they worked at Portuguesa Santista. The partnership ended in 2016 when they both faced health problems and decided to retire.

== Death ==
Tata died in São Paulo at age 68, due to a lung cancer.

== Honours ==
=== As player ===
São José

- Campeonato Paulista Série A2: 1980
- Torneio Incentivo: 1981

=== As manager ===
São José

- Copa Vale do Paraíba: 1996

=== As assistant manager ===
Náutico

- Campeonato Pernambucano: 2001, 2002

Internacional

- Campeonato Gaúcho: 2003, 2005

São Caetano

- Campeonato Paulista: 2004

São Paulo

- Campeonato Brasileiro Série A: 2006, 2007, 2008

Fluminense

- Campeonato Brasileiro Série A: 2010

Santos

- Copa Libertadores: 2011
- Recopa Sudamericana: 2012
- Campeonato Paulista: 2011, 2012
