= Nenê (footballer, born 1944) =

Brazilian footballer

Personal information
- Full name: Érico de Paula Coelho Filho
- Date of birth: 8 September 1944
- Place of birth: Jaboatão dos Guararapes, Brazil
- Date of death: 29 October 2014 (aged 70)
- Place of death: Sorocaba, Brazil
- Position: Midfielder

Youth career
- –1963: Piraju FC

Senior career*
Years	Team	Apps	(Gls)
1964–1973	São Paulo	263	(22)
1971	→ Sport Recife (loan)		
1973–1974	Náutico		
1974	Operário-MS		
1975–1977	Colorado-PR		
1977	Coritiba		
1978	São Bento		

Managerial career
- 1980s: São Bento
- 1993: Atlético Sorocaba
- * Club domestic league appearances and goals as of 30 August 2023

Érico de Paula Coelho Filho (8 September 1944 – 29 October 2014), simply known as Nenê, was a Brazilian former professional footballer and manager who played as a midfielder.

== Career ==
Nenê started in the youth categories of Piraju FC, and after a victory over the São Paulo reserves, was signed by the club. He played for several years at the Morumbi, until ended his career at São Bento de Sorocaba, the city where he created ties and lived until his last days. He was coach of two clubs in the city (São Bento and Atlético Sorocaba).

== Honours ==
=== São Paulo ===
- Campeonato Paulista: 1970
