= Carlos Alberto Rodrigues =

Brazilian footballer

Carlos Alberto
Personal information
- Full name: Carlos Alberto Rodrigues
- Date of birth: 12 July 1947 (age 79)
- Place of birth: São Paulo, Brazil
- Position: Midfielder

Youth career
- –1966: Nitro-Química

Senior career*
Years	Team	Apps	(Gls)
1966–1972	São Paulo	130	(8)
1967	→ Uberaba (loan)		
1968	→ XV de Jaú (loan)		
1972–1974	Grêmio	121	(1)
1974–1978	Santa Cruz		
1979–1980	Colorado-PR		
1980–1981	Atlético Paranaense		
1981–1982	Taubaté		
1982–1983	Paysandu-SC		
1983–1984	Blumenau		
- * Club domestic league appearances and goals as of 30 September 2023

Carlos Alberto Rodrigues (born 12 July 1947), also known as Carlos Alberto, is a Brazilian former professional footballer, who played as a midfielder.

== Career ==
Carlos Alberto played for São Paulo during the 1970s, where he won state titles in 1970 and 1971. He also had notable spells at Grêmio, and at Santa Cruz, where he was champion of Pernambuco in 1976 and 1978.

== Honours ==
São Paulo

- Campeonato Paulista: 1970, 1971

Santa Cruz

- Campeonato Pernambucano: 1976, 1978
