= Téia (footballer) =

Brazilian footballer

Personal information
- Full name: Antônio Zelenkov Silvestre
- Date of birth: 29 April 1944 (age 82)
- Place of birth: Regente Feijó, Brazil
- Position: Forward

Youth career
- Bancária

Senior career*
Years	Team	Apps	(Gls)
1964–1965	Bancária		
1966–1968	Ferroviária	100	(61)
1968–1971	São Paulo	61	(19)
1972	Ceará		
1973	Colorado-PR		
1974–1975	América-SP		
1976	Colorado-PR		
- * Club domestic league appearances and goals as of 1 September 2023

Antônio Zelenkov Silvestre (born 29 April 1944), better known as Téia, is a Brazilian former professional footballer who played as a forward.

== Career ==
Téia started his career at AE Bancária de Fernandópolis (current Fernandópolis FC), and after scoring 4 goals in the same match, was hired by Ferroviária de Araraquara, where become the top scorer in the 1968 Campeonato Paulista with 20 goals scored. After this, Téia went to São Paulo FC where he won the 1971 Campeonato Paulista title. He retired in Colorado de Curitiba, where he still lives today.

== Honours ==
=== São Paulo ===
- Campeonato Paulista: 1971

=== Ferroviária ===
- Campeonato Paulista Série A2: 1966

=== Individual ===
- 1968 Campeonato Paulista top scorer: 20 goals
