= 1968 Campeonato Paulista =

Campeonato Paulista – Série A1
- Season: 1968
- Champions: Santos (11th title)
- Relegated: Comercial
- Matches: 182
- Goals: 528 (2.9 per match)
- Best player: Pelé (Santos)
- Top goalscorer: Téia – 20 goals
- Biggest home win: Corinthians 7-0 Portuguesa Santista (March 23, 1968)
- Biggest away win: Portuguesa Santista 0-6 Santos (February 11, 1968); Comercial 2-8 Santos (April 7, 1968)
- Highest scoring: Comercial 2-8 Santos (April 7, 1968)

The 1968 Campeonato Paulista da Divisão Especial de Futebol Profissional, organized by the Federação Paulista de Futebol, was the 67th season of São Paulo's top professional football league. Santos won the title for the 11th time. Comercial was relegated. Ferroviária's Téia was the top scorer with 20 goals.

== Championship ==
The championship was disputed in a double-round robin system, with the team with the most points winning the title and the team with the fewest points being relegated.

Pos	Team	Pld	W	D	L	GF	GA	GD	Pts	Qualification or relegation
1	Santos	26	22	1	3	71	22	+49	45	Champions
2	Corinthians	26	14	6	6	46	28	+18	34	
3	Ferroviária	26	11	8	7	42	31	+11	30	
4	Portuguesa	26	11	6	9	39	31	+8	28	
5	São Paulo	26	11	6	9	39	36	+3	28	
6	São Bento	26	11	5	10	40	44	−4	27	
7	XV de Piracicaba	26	9	6	11	36	36	0	24	
8	Botafogo	26	6	11	9	31	39	−8	23	
9	Guarani	26	8	6	12	28	29	−1	22	
10	Portuguesa Santista	26	10	2	14	31	51	−20	22	
11	Palmeiras	26	8	5	13	34	43	−9	21	
12	Juventus	26	8	4	14	29	39	−10	20	
13	América	26	8	4	14	31	43	−12	20	
14	Comercial	26	7	6	13	31	56	−25	20	Relegated

Updated to match(es) played on July 3, 1968. Source: RSSSF.com
Rules for classification: 1) points; 2) goal difference; 3) wins; 4) number of goals scored.

== Top Scores ==
Rank	Player	Club	Season
1	Teía	Ferroviária	20
2	Toninho Guerreiro	Santos	19
3	Pelé	Santos	17
4	Flávio Minuano	Corinthians	15
5	Tupãzinho	Palmeiras	10
6	Babá	São Paulo	9
6	Edu	Santos	9
6	Douglas	Santos	9
6	Leivinha	Portuguesa	9
