= Paulo Nani =

Brazilian footballer

Personal information
- Full name: Paulo Nani da Silva
- Date of birth: 8 February 1950 (age 76)
- Place of birth: São Paulo, Brazil
- Position: Right winger

Youth career
- –1970: São Paulo

Senior career*
Years	Team	Apps	(Gls)
1970–1973	São Paulo	138	(8)
1974	Fluminense	14	(2)
1975	Santos		
1976	Juventus		
1977	Atlético Goianiense		
- * Club domestic league appearances and goals as of 25 September 2023

Paulo Nani da Silva (born 8 February 1950), also known as Paulo Nani, is a Brazilian former professional footballer who played as a right winger.

== Career ==
Revealed in his youth at São Paulo FC, he played for the club from 1970 to 1972. He also played for Fluminense, Santos, Juventus and Atlético Goianiense.

== Personal life ==
Paulo was a member of the city council of Carapicuiba from 1997 to 2000, where he also owns a sporting goods store.

== Honours ==
São Paulo

- Campeonato Paulista: 1970, 1971
