= Everaldo (footballer, born 1949) =

Brazilian footballer

Personal information
- Full name: Everaldo Ferreira de Lima
- Date of birth: 11 June 1949
- Place of birth: Catende, Brazil
- Date of death: 20 January 2001 (aged 51)
- Place of death: Ponta Porã, Brazil
- Position: Forward

Senior career*
Years	Team	Apps	(Gls)
1970–1974	São Paulo	58	(10)
1973	→ Bahia (loan)		
1975–1977	Operário-MS		
1978	Grêmio	24	(5)
1978–1979	Atlético Mineiro		
1979	Comercial-MS		
- * Club domestic league appearances and goals as of 5 October 2023

Everaldo Ferreira de Lima (11 June 1949 – 20 January 2001), known as Everaldo, was a Brazilian professional footballer who played as a forward.

== Career ==
Everaldo was part of São Paulo's championship squad in the 1970 and 1971 state championships. He also played for Operário de Campo Grande, Grêmio, Atlético Mineiro and Comercial.

== Honours ==
São Paulo

- Campeonato Paulista: 1970, 1971

Operário

- Campeonato Mato-Grossense: 1974, 1976, 1977

Operário disputed the Campeonato Mato-Grossense before the split of Mato Grosso do Sul, occurred in 1979.

Atlético Mineiro

- Campeonato Mineiro: 1978
- Copa dos Campeões da Copa Brasil: 1978

== Death ==
Everaldo died of a stroke in the city of Ponta Porã, at age of 51.
