= Basílio (footballer, born 1949) =

Brazilian footballer

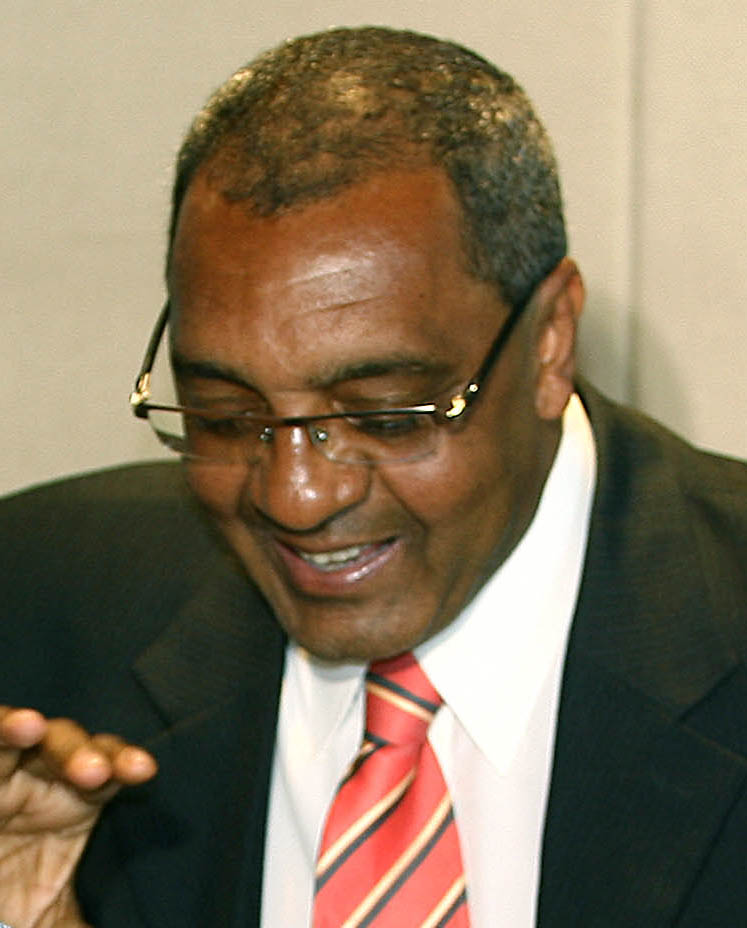
- Brasílio, pictured in 2007

Personal information
- Full name: João Roberto Basílio
- Date of birth: 4 February 1949 (age 77)
- Place of birth: São Paulo, Brazil
- Position: Attacking midfielder

Youth career
- Portuguesa

Senior career*
| Years | Team | Apps | (Gls) |
| 1964–1975 | Portuguesa | 318 | (75) |
| 1975–1981 | Corinthians | 253 | (29) |
| 1981 | Taubaté | | |
| 1982 | Juventus-SP | | |

Managerial career
- 1986: Corinthians
- 1987: Corinthians
- 1989–1990: Corinthians
- 1991: São José-SP
- 1991: Olímpia
- 1992: Corinthians
- 1993: Juventus-SP
- 1993: Bragantino
- 1995: Nacional-SP
- 1995–1996: Juventus-SP
- 1997: União São João
- 1997: Juventus-SP
- 2000: Inter de Limeira
- * Club domestic league appearances and goals

João Roberto Basílio (born 4 February 1949), simply known as Basílio, is a Brazilian former professional footballer and manager, who played as an attacking midfielder.

== Career ==
Revealed in the Portuguesa youth categories, he became an idol of the club, making more than 300 appearances and participating in winning the 1973 state title. In 1975 he was sold to Corinthians, a club that arrived with the mission of replacing Roberto Rivellino.

He entered the club's history on 13 October 1977 by scoring the goal in the third game of the Campeonato Paulista final, against Ponte Preta, which ended a 22-year title drought.

He also had a quick career as a manager during the 90s, coaching Corinthians, Juventus-SP, São José, Nacional, Bragantino, União São João and Inter de Limeira. In 2013 he became a sports commentator, participating in the traditional Mesa Redonda program on TV Gazeta.

== Honours ==
Portuguesa

- Campeonato Paulista: 1973 (shared)
- Taça Estado de São Paulo: 1973

Corinthians

- Campeonato Paulista: 1977, 1979
