= José Carlos =

José Carlos is a Portuguese/Spanish given name. Notable people with the name include:

- José Carlos Amaral Vieira, Brazilian composer and pianist
- José Carlos Araújo, Brazilian journalist
- José Carlos Araújo Nunes, Portuguese footballer
- José Carlos (footballer, born 1941) (1941–2025), Portuguese footballer
- José Carlos (footballer, born 1988), Brazilian footballer
- José Carlos Fernandes Vidigal, Angolan footballer and manager
- José Carlos (footballer, born 1987), Spanish footballer
- José Carlos Garcia Leal, Brazilian footballer
- José Carlos (footballer, born 1966), Portuguese footballer
- José Carlos (footballer, born 1996), Spanish footballer
- Jose Emmanuel L. Carlos, Filipino politician

== See also ==
- José
- Zé Carlos
- Carlos (disambiguation)
