= Édson Cegonha =

Brazilian footballer

Personal information
- Full name: Édson de Souza Barbosa
- Date of birth: June 20, 1943
- Place of birth: Rio de Janeiro, Brazil
- Date of death: 17 July 2015 (aged 72)
- Place of death: Rio de Janeiro, Brazil
- Positions: Midfielder; left back

Youth career
- Bonsucesso

Senior career*
Years	Team	Apps	(Gls)
1962–1963	Bonsucesso		
1964–1969	Corinthians	187	(17)
1969–1973	São Paulo	208	(17)
1973–1975	Palmeiras	80	(3)

International career
1966	Brazil	1	(0)
- * Club domestic league appearances and goals as of 1 September 2023

Édson de Souza Barbosa (20 June 1943 – 17 July 2015), mostly known as Édson Cegonha, was a Brazilian former professional footballer who played as a midfielder and left back.

== Career ==
Born in Rio de Janeiro, Cegonha made the mostly of his career in São Paulo, being one of the few players to play for the three biggest clubs in the capital ("Trio de Ferro").

Played for the national team twice, an unofficial one in 1965, where Corinthians represented Brazil against Arsenal, and in a friendly against Wales, 18 May 1966.

Edson was also an assistant coach at Corinthians in the late 1990s.

== Personal life ==
Édson was married to the sambista Beth Carvalho, and father of actress Luana Carvalho.

== Death ==
Cegonha died on July 17, 2015, after a multiple organ failure.

== Honours ==
=== Corinthians ===
- Torneio Rio-São Paulo: 1966

=== São Paulo ===
- Campeonato Paulista: 1970, 1971
