= 1973 in Brazilian football =

Football in Brazil
- Season: 1973

The following article presents a summary of the 1973 football (soccer) season in Brazil, which was the 72nd season of competitive football in the country.

== Campeonato Brasileiro Série A ==
Final Stage

Position	Team	Points	Played	Won	Drawn	Lost	For	Against	Difference
1	Palmeiras	5	3	2	1	0	3	1	2
2	São Paulo	3	3	1	1	1	4	2	2
3	Cruzeiro	2	3	1	0	2	1	2	-1
4	Internacional	2	3	1	0	2	3	6	-3

Palmeiras declared as the Campeonato Brasileiro champions.

== State championship champions ==
State	Champion	State	Champion
Acre	Rio Branco-AC	Pará	Remo
Alagoas	CRB	Paraíba	Campinense
Amapá	Amapá	Paraná	Coritiba
Amazonas	Rodoviária	Pernambuco	Santa Cruz
Bahia	Bahia	Piauí	River
Ceará	Fortaleza	Rio de Janeiro	Barbará
Distrito Federal	CEUB	Rio Grande do Norte	ABC
Espírito Santo	Rio Branco-ES	Rio Grande do Sul	Internacional
Goiás	Vila Nova	Rondônia	São Domingos
Guanabara	Fluminense	Roraima	-
Maranhão	Ferroviário-MA	Santa Catarina	Avaí
Mato Grosso	Operário (VG)	São Paulo	Santos; Portuguesa^{(1)}
Mato Grosso do Sul	-	Sergipe	Itabaiana
Minas Gerais	Cruzeiro	Tocantins	-

^{(1)}Santos and Portuguesa shared the São Paulo State Championship title.

== Youth competition champions ==
Competition	Champion
Copa São Paulo de Juniores	Fluminense

== Other competition champions ==
Competition	Champion
Taça Minas Gerais	Cruzeiro
Torneio do Povo	Coritiba

== Brazilian clubs in international competitions ==
Team	Copa Libertadores 1973
Botafogo	Semifinals
Palmeiras	Group stage

== Brazil national team ==
The following table lists all the games played by the Brazil national football team in official competitions and friendly matches during 1973.

Date	Opposition	Result	Score	Brazil scorers	Competition
May 27, 1973	Bolivia	W	5-0	Rivellino (2), Valdomiro, Leivinha (2)	International Friendly
June 3, 1973	Algeria	W	2-0	Rivellino, Paulo César Caju	International Friendly
June 6, 1973	Tunisia	W	4-1	Paulo César Caju (2), Valdomiro, Leivinha	International Friendly
June 9, 1973	Italy	L	0-2	-	International Friendly
June 13, 1973	Austria	D	1-1	Jairzinho	International Friendly
June 16, 1973	West Germany	W	1-0	Dirceu	International Friendly
June 21, 1973	Soviet Union	W	1-0	Jairzinho	International Friendly
June 25, 1973	Sweden	L	0-1	-	International Friendly
June 30, 1973	Scotland	W	1-0	Derek Johnstone (own goal)	International Friendly
July 3, 1973	(Republic of Ireland) Shamrock Rovers XI	W	4-3	Paulo César Caju (2), Jairzinho, Valdomiro	International Friendly (unofficial match)
December 19, 1973	Rest of the World	W	2-1	Pelé, Luís Pereira	International Friendly (unofficial match)
