= Zé Carlos =

Masculine given name

Zé Carlos is a nickname for people with the given name José Carlos; it can refer to:

- Zé Carlos (footballer, 1936–2017), full name José Carlos Coelho, Brazilian football forward
- Zé Carlos (footballer, born 1943), full name José Carlos Gaspar Ferreira, Brazilian football defender
- Zé Carlos (footballer, 1945–2018), full name José Carlos Bernardo, Brazilian football centre-back
- Zé Carlos (poet) (1949-1977), full name José Carlos Schwarz, Bissau-Guinean people poet and musician
- Zé Carlos (footballer, born 1954), full name José Carlos dos Santos, Brazilian football forward
- Zé Carlos (footballer, born 1955), full name José Carlos Pessanha, Brazilian football goalkeeper
- Zé Carlos (footballer, born 1956), full name José Carlos Raymundo, Brazilian football forward
- Zé Carlos (footballer, 1962–2009), full name José Carlos da Costa Araújo, Brazilian football goalkeeper
- Zé Carlos (footballer, born 1965), full name José Carlos Pereira do Nascimento, Brazilian football defender
- Zé Carlos (footballer, 1968–2024), full name José Carlos de Almeida, Brazilian football defender
- Zé Carlos (footballer, born 1975), full name José Carlos Santos Silva, Brazilian football forward
- Zé Carlos (footballer, born 1979), full name José Carlos Gomes Filho, Brazilian football midfielder
- Zé Carlos (footballer, born 1983), full name José Carlos Ferreira Filho, Brazilian football striker
- Zé Carlos (footballer, born 1985), full name José Carlos dos Anjos Sávio, Brazilian football goalkeeper
- Zé Carlos Semedo (born 1992), Santomean football forward
- Zé Carlos (footballer, born 1998), full name José Carlos Teixeira Lopes Reis Gonçalves, Portuguese football right-back
- Zé Carlos (footballer, born 2001), full name José Carlos Natário Ferreira, Portuguese football right-back
- Zé Carlos (footballer, born 2004), full name José Carlos de Oliveira, Brazilian football forward
- Zé Carlos Paulista (born 1965), full name José Carlos Perfeito Carneiro, Brazilian football goalkeeper
- Zé Carlos, the 8th series of Gato Fedorento, a Portuguese comedy show

== See also ==
- José Carlos (disambiguation)
