= Paraná (footballer) =

Brazilian footballer (born 1942)

Personal information
- Full name: Adhemir de Barros
- Date of birth: March 21, 1942 (age 84)
- Place of birth: Brazil

Senior career*
Years	Team	Apps	(Gls)
1960–1965	São Bento		
1965–1973	São Paulo		
1973–1974	Tiradentes-PI		
1974	Operário-MS		
1975–1976	Colorado		
1976	Londrina		
1977	Francana		
1978	São Bento		
1979–1980	AA Barra Bonita		

International career
1965–1966	Brazil	9	(1)
- * Club domestic league appearances and goals

Adhemir de Barros (born March 21, 1942, in Cambará, Paraná, Brazil), best known as Paraná, is a former association footballer. He played at São Bento, São Paulo, Londrina, and Brazil national football team, which had participated at 1966 FIFA World Cup, playing one match.

== Honours ==
São Paulo

- Campeonato Paulista: 1970, 1971
