= 1969 in Brazilian football =

Football in Brazil
- Season: 1969

The following article presents a summary of the 1969 football (soccer) season in Brazil, which was the 68th season of competitive football in the country.

== Torneio Roberto Gomes Pedrosa ==
Final Stage

Position	Team	Points	Played	Won	Drawn	Lost	For	Against	Difference
1	Palmeiras	4	3	1	2	0	4	2	2
2	Cruzeiro	4	3	1	2	0	5	4	1
3	Corinthians	3	3	1	1	1	2	2	0
4	Botafogo	1	3	0	1	2	3	6	-3

Palmeiras declared as the Torneio Roberto Gomes Pedrosa champions.

== State championship champions ==
State	Champion	State	Champion
Acre	Juventus-AC	Pará	Paysandu
Alagoas	CRB	Paraíba	Botafogo-PB
Amapá	Macapá	Paraná	Coritiba
Amazonas	Nacional	Pernambuco	Santa Cruz
Bahia	Fluminense de Feira	Piauí	Piauí
Ceará	Fortaleza	Rio de Janeiro	Americano
Distrito Federal	Coenge	Rio Grande do Norte	América-RN
Espírito Santo	Rio Branco-ES	Rio Grande do Sul	Internacional
Goiás	Vila Nova	Rondônia	Moto Clube
Guanabara	Fluminense	Roraima	-
Maranhão	Maranhão	Santa Catarina	Metropol
Mato Grosso	Mixto	São Paulo	Santos
Mato Grosso do Sul	-	Sergipe	Itabaiana
Minas Gerais	Cruzeiro	Tocantins	-

== Youth competition champions ==
Competition	Champion
Copa São Paulo de Juniores	Corinthians

== Other competition champions ==
Competition	Champion
Copa Norte-Nordeste	Ceará
Torneio dos Campeões da CBD	Grêmio Maringá

== Brazilian clubs in international competitions ==
Team	Copa Libertadores 1969
Botafogo	Withdrew
Santos	Withdrew

== Brazil national team ==
The following table lists all the games played by the Brazil national football team in official competitions and friendly matches during 1969.

Date	Opposition	Result	Score	Brazil scorers	Competition
April 7, 1969	Peru	W	2-1	Jairzinho, Gérson	International Friendly
April 9, 1969	Peru	W	3-2	Pelé, Tostão, Edu	International Friendly
April 12, 1969	England	W	2-1	Tostão, Jairzinho	International Friendly
July 6, 1969	(Brazil) Bahia	W	4-0	Pelé, Jairzinho, Edu, Tostão	International Friendly (unofficial match)
July 9, 1969	Sergipe State Combined Team	W	8-2	Toninho Guerreiro (3), Clodoaldo, Paulo César Caju, Gérson, Beto (own goal), Paulo Borges	International Friendly (unofficial match)
July 13, 1969	Pernambuco State Combined Team	W	6-1	Edu (3), Jairzinho, Pelé, Tostão	International Friendly (unofficial match)
August 1, 1969	(Colombia) Millonarios	W	2-0	Gérson, Rivellino	International Friendly (unofficial match)
August 6, 1969	Colombia	W	2-0	Tostão (2)	World Cup Qualifying
August 10, 1969	Venezuela	W	5-0	Tostão (3), Pelé (2)	World Cup Qualifying
August 17, 1969	Paraguay	W	3-0	Mendoza (own goal), Jairzinho, Edu	World Cup Qualifying
August 21, 1969	Colombia	W	6-2	Tostão (2), Edu, Pelé, Rivellino, Jairzinho	World Cup Qualifying
August 24, 1969	Venezuela	W	6-0	Tostão (3), Pelé (2), Jairzinho	World Cup Qualifying
August 31, 1969	Paraguay	W	1-0	Pelé	World Cup Qualifying
August 1, 1969	(Brazil) Atlético Mineiro	L	1-2	Pelé	International Friendly (unofficial match)
