= Zé Carlos Paulista =

Brazilian footballer

Zé Carlos
Personal information
- Full name: José Carlos Perfeito Carneiro
- Date of birth: 19 May 1965 (age 61)
- Place of birth: Ipameri, Brazil
- Position: Goalkeeper

Youth career
- São Paulo

Senior career*
Years	Team	Apps	(Gls)
1985–1987	São Paulo	13	(0)
1988–1989	Americano		
1989	América-SP		
1989–1990	Flamengo	18	(0)
1991–1992	Botafogo		
1993–1994	America-RJ		
- * Club domestic league appearances and goals as of 28 November 2023

José Carlos Perfeito Carneiro (born 19 May 1965), better known as Zé Carlos or Zé Carlos Paulista, is a Brazilian former professional footballer who played as a goalkeeper.

== Career ==
Revealed at São Paulo youth sectors, he was part of the Brazilian champion squads of 1986, replacing Gilmar Rinaldi in some games during the campaign, and of Paulista in 1987. At Flamengo, he gained the nickname "Paulista" (disregarding the fact that the athlete is from Goiás) due to the presence of the renowned Zé Carlos, for whom he arrived to compete for the position. Zé Carlos Paulista was part of the Brazilian Cup winning squad in 1990.

== Honours ==
São Paulo

- Campeonato Brasileiro: 1986
- Campeonato Paulista: 1987

Flamengo

- Copa do Brasil: 1990
- Taça Guanabara: 1989
