= 1977 Campeonato Paulista =

Campeonato Paulista – Série A1
- Season: 1977
- Champions: Corinthians
- Copa Brasil: Corinthians; Santos; Comercial; Ponte Preta; XV de Piracicaba; Guarani; Palmeiras; São Paulo; Botafogo; Portuguesa; Noroeste; América
- Matches played: 379
- Goals scored: 875 (2.31 per match)
- Top goalscorer: Serginho Chulapa (São Paulo) – 32 goals
- Biggest home win: América 5-0 Noroeste (June 5, 1977); São Bento 6-1 Portuguesa Santista (June 5, 1977); São Paulo 6-1 Marília (July 13, 1977)
- Biggest away win: Marília 0-5 Palmeiras (July 20, 1977)
- Highest scoring: Paulista 6-3 Portuguesa Santista (August 7, 1977)

The 1977 Campeonato Paulista da Divisão Especial de Futebol Profissional was the 76th season of São Paulo's top professional football league. Corinthians won the championship for their 16th title. No teams were relegated. Serginho Chulapa from São Paulo was the top goalscorer, with 32 goals.

== Championship ==
The first phase of the championship was divided into two rounds, in which the nineteen teams of the championship were divided into four groups;five with five teams and one with four, with each team playing once against all other teams, and the best team of each group passing to the Semifinals. The champions of each round qualified to the Third round, along with the six best teams in the aggregate table. Wins by three goals' difference or more were worth an extra point.

In the Third round, the eight remaining teams would be divided into two groups of four, each team playing once against the teams of its own group and the other group, and the best teams of each group qualifying to the Finals.

=== First round ===
==== Group A ====
Pos	Team	Pld	W	D	L	GF	GA	GD	Pts	Qualification or relegation
1	Palmeiras	18	12	5	1	33	13	+20	31	Qualified
2	Ponte Preta	18	5	10	3	29	21	+8	23	
3	São Bento	18	4	7	7	12	19	−7	15	
4	Ferroviária	18	5	4	9	10	19	−9	14	
5	Portuguesa Santista	18	3	8	7	12	23	−11	14	

Updated to match(es) played on May 11, 1977. Source: RSSSF.com
Rules for classification: 1) points; 2) wins; 3) goal difference; 4) number of goals scored.

==== Group B ====
Pos	Team	Pld	W	D	L	GF	GA	GD	Pts	Qualification or relegation
1	Botafogo	18	11	6	1	30	10	+20	32	Qualified
2	Corinthians	18	9	5	4	25	13	+12	26	
3	XV de Piracicaba	18	7	8	3	18	13	+5	22	
4	Juventus	18	5	7	6	25	23	+2	19	
5	XV de Jaú	18	5	1	12	12	25	−13	12	

Updated to match(es) played on May 11, 1977. Source: RSSSF.com
Rules for classification: 1) points; 2) wins; 3) goal difference; 4) number of goals scored.

==== Group C ====
Pos	Team	Pld	W	D	L	GF	GA	GD	Pts	Qualification or relegation
1	São Paulo	18	10	5	3	30	15	+15	27	Qualified
2	Portuguesa	18	4	7	7	20	22	−2	17	
3	Noroeste	18	6	4	8	20	26	−6	16	
4	Marília	18	3	6	9	15	27	−12	12	
5	Comercial	18	3	4	11	15	33	−18	10	

Updated to match(es) played on May 11, 1977. Source: RSSSF.com
Rules for classification: 1) points; 2) wins; 3) goal difference; 4) number of goals scored.

==== Group D ====
Pos	Team	Pld	W	D	L	GF	GA	GD	Pts	Qualification or relegation
1	Guarani	18	8	5	5	22	16	+6	23	Qualified
2	Santos	18	7	6	5	20	18	+2	21	
3	América	18	7	3	8	17	23	−6	18	
4	Paulista	18	3	8	7	13	19	−6	15	

Updated to match(es) played on May 11, 1977. Source: RSSSF.com
Rules for classification: 1) points; 2) wins; 3) goal difference; 4) number of goals scored.

==== Semifinals ====
Team 1	Score	Team 2
Botafogo	0–0	Guarani
Palmeiras	1–3	São Paulo

==== Finals ====
Team 1	Score	Team 2
São Paulo	0–0	Botafogo

=== Second round ===
==== Group A ====
Pos	Team	Pld	W	D	L	GF	GA	GD	Pts	Qualification or relegation
1	Portuguesa	18	8	7	3	30	16	+14	26	Qualified
2	Santos	18	9	4	5	23	16	+7	24	
3	Comercial	18	6	7	5	23	18	+5	20	
4	São Bento	18	6	2	10	21	30	−9	15	
5	Noroeste	18	2	3	13	12	35	−23	7	

Updated to match(es) played on August 25, 1977. Source: RSSSF.com
Rules for classification: 1) points; 2) wins; 3) goal difference; 4) number of goals scored.

==== Group B ====
Pos	Team	Pld	W	D	L	GF	GA	GD	Pts	Qualification or relegation
1	São Paulo	18	9	5	4	31	12	+19	28	Qualified
2	Guarani	18	8	7	3	21	13	+8	24	
3	América	18	6	4	8	24	18	+6	19	
4	Paulista	18	5	3	10	21	32	−11	15	
5	Marília	18	5	2	11	15	35	−20	12	

Updated to match(es) played on August 25, 1977. Source: RSSSF.com
Rules for classification: 1) points; 2) wins; 3) goal difference; 4) number of goals scored.

==== Group C ====
Pos	Team	Pld	W	D	L	GF	GA	GD	Pts	Qualification or relegation
1	Corinthians	18	13	0	5	34	17	+17	29	Qualified
2	Ponte Preta	18	12	4	2	25	9	+16	29	
3	Juventus	18	7	4	7	20	20	0	20	
4	XV de Jaú	18	5	5	8	20	30	−10	16	
5	Portuguesa Santista	18	0	3	15	13	45	−32	3	

Updated to match(es) played on August 25, 1977. Source: RSSSF.com
Rules for classification: 1) points; 2) wins; 3) goal difference; 4) number of goals scored.

==== Group D ====
Pos	Team	Pld	W	D	L	GF	GA	GD	Pts	Qualification or relegation
1	Palmeiras	18	9	8	1	39	19	+20	30	Qualified
2	Botafogo	18	8	6	4	25	17	+8	23	
3	XV de Piracicaba	18	7	3	8	18	29	−11	17	
4	Ferroviária	18	6	3	9	17	20	−3	16	

Updated to match(es) played on August 25, 1977. Source: RSSSF.com
Rules for classification: 1) points; 2) wins; 3) goal difference; 4) number of goals scored.

==== Semifinals ====
Team 1	Score	Team 2
Palmeiras	2–1	Portuguesa
Corinthians	2–1	São Paulo

==== Finals ====
Team 1	Score	Team 2
Palmeiras	0–1	Corinthians

=== Aggregate table ===
Pos	Team	Pld	W	D	L	GF	GA	GD	Pts	Qualification or relegation
1	Palmeiras	36	21	13	2	72	32	+40	61	Qualified
2	Corinthians	36	22	5	9	59	30	+29	55	Qualified as stage finalists
3	São Paulo	36	19	10	7	61	27	+34	55	Qualified
4	Botafogo	36	19	12	5	55	27	+28	55	Qualified as stage finalists
5	Ponte Preta	36	17	14	5	54	30	+24	52	Qualified
6	Guarani	36	16	12	8	43	29	+14	47	Qualified
7	Santos	36	16	10	10	43	34	+9	45	Qualified
8	Portuguesa	38	12	16	10	50	38	+12	45	Qualified
9	XV de Piracicaba	36	14	11	11	36	42	−6	39	
10	Juventus	36	12	11	13	45	43	+2	39	
11	América	36	13	7	16	41	41	0	37	
12	Ferroviária	36	11	7	18	27	39	−12	30	
13	São Bento	36	10	9	17	33	49	−16	30	
14	Comercial	36	9	11	16	38	51	−13	30	
15	Paulista	36	8	11	17	34	51	−17	30	
16	XV de Jaú	36	10	6	20	32	55	−23	28	
17	Marília	36	8	8	20	30	62	−32	24	
18	Noroeste	36	8	7	21	32	61	−29	23	
19	Portuguesa Santista	36	3	11	22	25	68	−43	17	

Updated to match(es) played on August 25, 1977. Source: RSSSF.com
Rules for classification: 1) points; 2) wins; 3) goal difference; 4) number of goals scored.

=== Third round ===
==== Group E ====
Pos	Team	Pld	W	D	L	GF	GA	GD	Pts	Qualification or relegation
1	Ponte Preta	7	5	2	0	9	2	+7	12	Qualified
2	Botafogo	6	2	0	4	6	7	−1	4 (Note: Botafogo and Palmeiras didn't play their last match)	
3	Santos	7	1	2	4	4	9	−5	4	
4	Palmeiras	6	0	4	2	4	7	−3	4	

Updated to match(es) played on October 2, 1977. Source: RSSSF.com
Rules for classification: 1) points; 2) wins; 3) goal difference; 4) number of goals scored.

==== Group F ====
Pos	Team	Pld	W	D	L	GF	GA	GD	Pts	Qualification or relegation
1	Corinthians	7	4	1	2	8	5	+3	9	Qualified
2	São Paulo	7	3	2	2	8	6	+2	8	
3	Portuguesa	7	2	3	2	5	6	−1	7	
4	Guarani	7	2	2	3	6	8	−2	6	

Updated to match(es) played on October 2, 1977. Source: RSSSF.com
Rules for classification: 1) points; 2) wins; 3) goal difference; 4) number of goals scored.

=== Finals ===
Team 1	Series	Team 2	Game 1	Game 2	Game 3
Corinthians	4–2	Ponte Preta	1–0	1–2	1-0
