= Vail Mota =

Brazilian footballer

Personal information
- Full name: Vail Pellegrineti Mota
- Date of birth: 21 June 1938
- Place of birth: Itirapina, Brazil
- Date of death: 16 December 2009 (aged 71)
- Place of death: Araraquara, Brazil

Youth career
- Years: Team
- Ferroviária
- AD Araraquara

Managerial career
- 1968–1971: Ferroviária
- 1971: América-SP
- 1972: São Paulo
- 1972: Noroeste
- 1973: Atlético Paranaense
- 1975–1978: Ferroviária
- 1978: Remo
- 1979: Sport Recife
- 1980: Vila Nova
- 1981: Uberlândia
- 1982: Francana
- 1982–1983: Vila Nova
- 1984: Goiás
- 1984: Catuense
- 1984–1985: Comercial-MS
- 1985: Joinville
- 1985: Ferroviária
- 1986: Paulista
- 1987: São José-SP
- 1987: Catuense
- 1988: Blumenau
- 1989: Ferroviária
- 1990: Blumenau
- 1990: Ferroviária
- 1991: XV de Jaú
- 1992–1995: Ferroviária
- 1995: Catanduvense
- 1996: Ferroviária
- 1997: Blumenau

Vail Mota (21 June 1938 – 16 December 2009), was a Brazilian professional football manager.

== Career ==
After attempting a career as a player for the former AD Araraquara, and for Ferroviária in the 1950s, Vail Mota graduated in physical education, being Diede Lameiro physical trainer at Ferroviária itself. He later became the coach who directed Ferroviária the most times, with 398 appearances. He also coached São Paulo in 1972, managing the club for 10 matches., and coached several other teams, especially Vila Nova, where he was champion of Goiás in 1980 and 1982, and Catuense, where he was runner-up in Bahia in 1987.

== Death ==
Vail Mota died on 16 December 2009 in Araraquara, victim of a kidney infection.

== Honours ==
Vila Nova

- Campeonato Goiano: 1980, 1982
