= 1971 in Brazilian football =

Football in Brazil
- Season: 1971

The following article presents a summary of the 1971 football (soccer) season in Brazil, which was the 70th season of competitive football in the country.

== Campeonato Brasileiro Série A ==
Final Stage

Position	Team	Points	Played	Won	Drawn	Lost	For	Against	Difference
1	Atlético Mineiro	4	2	2	0	0	2	0	2
2	São Paulo	2	2	1	0	1	4	2	2
3	Botafogo	0	2	0	0	2	1	5	-4

Atlético Mineiro declared as the Campeonato Brasileiro champions.

== Campeonato Brasileiro Série B ==
Semifinals

North-Northeastern Zone

Team 1	Agg.	Team 2	1st leg	2nd leg
Itabaiana	0-2	Remo	0-0	0-2

Central-Southern Zone

Team #1	Agg	Team #2	1st leg	2nd leg	3rd leg
Ponte Preta	1-1	Villa Nova	1-0	0-1	1-1 (5–6 after extra time, 2–3 pen)

Final

December 5, 1972

Remo	1–0	Villa Nova

December 8, 1972

Villa Nova	3–0	Remo

December 11, 1972

Villa Nova	2–1	Remo

Villa Nova declared as the Campeonato Brasileiro Série B champions by aggregate score of 4–2.

=== Promotion ===
No club was promoted to the following year's first level.

== State championship champions ==
State	Champion	State	Champion
Acre	Rio Branco-AC	Pará	Paysandu
Alagoas	CSA	Paraíba	Campinense
Amapá	São José-AP	Paraná	Coritiba
Amazonas	Fast	Pernambuco	Santa Cruz
Bahia	Bahia	Piauí	Flamengo-PI
Ceará	Ceará	Rio de Janeiro	Central
Distrito Federal	Colombo	Rio Grande do Norte	ABC
Espírito Santo	Rio Branco-ES	Rio Grande do Sul	Internacional
Goiás	Goiás	Rondônia	Moto Clube
Guanabara	Fluminense	Roraima	-
Maranhão	Ferroviário-MA	Santa Catarina	América-SC
Mato Grosso	Dom Bosco	São Paulo	São Paulo
Mato Grosso do Sul	-	Sergipe	Sergipe
Minas Gerais	América-MG	Tocantins	-

== Youth competition champions ==
Competition	Champion
Copa São Paulo de Juniores	Fluminense

== Other competition champions ==
Competition	Champion
Torneio do Povo	Corinthians

== Brazilian clubs in international competitions ==
Team	Copa Libertadores 1971
Fluminense	Group stage
Palmeiras	Semifinals

== Brazil national team ==
The following table lists all the games played by the Brazil national football team in official competitions and friendly matches during 1971.

Date	Opposition	Result	Score	Brazil scorers	Competition
July 11, 1971	Austria	D	1-1	Pelé	International Friendly
July 14, 1971	Czechoslovakia	W	1-0	Tostão	International Friendly
July 18, 1971	Yugoslavia	D	2-2	Rivellino, Gérson	International Friendly
July 21, 1971	Hungary	D	0-0	-	International Friendly
July 24, 1971	Paraguay	W	1-0	Claudiomiro	International Friendly
July 28, 1971	Argentina	D	1-1	Paulo César Caju	Roca Cup
July 31, 1971	Argentina	D	2-2	Tostão, Paulo César Caju	Roca Cup
