= Zé Roberto (footballer, born 1945) =

Brazilian footballer (1945–2016)

Personal information
- Full name: José Roberto Marques
- Date of birth: 31 May 1945
- Place of birth: São Paulo, Brazil
- Date of death: 7 May 2016 (aged 70)
- Place of death: Serra Negra, São Paulo, Brazil
- Position: Forward

Youth career
- 1960–1962: Botafogo-SP
- 1962–1964: São Paulo

Senior career*
Years	Team	Apps	(Gls)
1964–1972	São Paulo	147	(47)
1967	→ Francana (loan)		
1967	→ Guarani (loan)	5	(7)
1968	→ Athletico Paranaense (loan)	15	(8)
1971	→ Coritiba (loan)	28	(14)
1972–1974	Coritiba	107	(54)
1974–1975	Corinthians	60	(17)
1974–1975	→ O'Higgins (loan)	9	(4)
1976	Grêmio Maringá	2	(2)
1976	Portuguesa-RJ		
1977	ABC		
1977	Millonarios		
1978	Grêmio Maringá	8	(0)
1978	Athletico Paranaense		

International career
1964	Brazil Olympic	3	(1)
- * Club domestic league appearances and goals

José Roberto Marques (31 May 1945 – 7 May 2016 ) was a Brazilian footballer who competed in the 1964 Summer Olympics.

== Teams ==
- (Brazil) São Paulo 1964–1967
- (Brazil) Francana 1966
- (Brazil) Guarani 1967
- (Brazil) Athletico Paranaense 1968
- (Brazil) São Paulo 1969–1971
- (Brazil) Coritiba 1971
- (Brazil) São Paulo 1971–1972
- (Brazil) Coritiba 1972–1974
- (Brazil) Corinthians 1974
- (Chile) O'Higgins 1974–1975
- (Brazil) Corinthians 1975
- (Brazil) Grêmio Maringá 1976
- (Brazil) Portuguesa-RJ 1976
- (Brazil) ABC 1977
- (Colombia) Millonarios 1977
- (Brazil) Grêmio Maringá 1978
- (Brazil) Athletico Paranaense 1978

== Personal life ==
His father, Jerônimo, was a forward who played for Corinthians between 1942 and 1945.
