= 1971 Campeonato Paulista =

Campeonato Paulista – Série A1
- Season: 1971
- Champions: São Paulo
- Campeonato Nacional: São Paulo; Palmeiras; Santos; Corinthians; Portuguesa
- Matches played: 242
- Goals scored: 500 (2.07 per match)
- Top goalscorer: César Maluco (Palmeiras) – 18 goals
- Biggest home win: Palmeiras 7-0 São Bento (June 17, 1971)
- Biggest away win: Paulista 0-5 Portuguesa (April 21, 1971)
- Highest scoring: Paulista 6-1 Portuguesa Santista (November 28, 1970); Corinthians 4-3 Palmeiras (April 25, 1971); Corinthians 6-1 Juventus (May 30, 1971); Palmeiras 7-0 São Bento (June 17, 1971)

The 1971 Campeonato Paulista da Divisão Especial de Futebol Profissional, organized by the Federação Paulista de Futebol, was the 70th season of São Paulo's top professional football league. São Paulo won the title for the 10th time. No teams were relegated. Palmeiras's César Maluco was the top scorer with 18 goals.

== Championship ==
As in the previous year, a preliminary phase was contested before the championship proper, in which all teams played against each other twice and the six best teams qualified into the main championship. That phase was to be disputed in the second semester of 1970, by the teams that had been eliminated in that phase in the previous year, the four worst-placed teams in the main championship, and Noroeste, that had been promoted from the Second level.

In the championship proper, each team played against the others twice, and the team with the most points won the title.

=== Preliminary phase ===
Pos	Team	Pld	W	D	L	GF	GA	GD	Pts	Qualification or relegation
1	Guarani	20	9	9	2	23	12	+11	27	Qualified
2	Botafogo	20	11	4	5	34	28	+6	26	Qualified
3	Paulista	20	9	7	4	29	18	+11	25 (Note: The score of the December 9 Paulista v. Noroeste match is unknown, although it is known that Paulista won that match.)	Qualified
4	Ferroviária	20	9	4	7	26	19	+7	22	Qualified
5	Juventus	20	7	7	6	18	17	+1	21	Qualified
6	São Bento	20	8	4	8	22	21	+1	20	Qualified
7	Comercial	20	7	6	7	25	25	0	20	Eliminated
8	Noroeste	20	6	6	8	22	25	−3	18	Eliminated
9	América	20	6	5	9	15	27	−12	17	Eliminated
10	Portuguesa Santista	20	4	6	10	23	32	−9	14	Eliminated
11	XV de Piracicaba	20	3	4	13	15	28	−13	10	Eliminated

Updated to match(es) played on December 22, 1970. Source: Brfut.blogspot.com Brfut.blogspot.com
Rules for classification: 1) points; 2) goal difference; 3) wins; 4) number of goals scored.

==== Results ====
Home \ Away	AME	BOT	COM	FER	GUA	JUV	NOR	PAU	AAP	SBO	XVP
América	—	1–2	2–3	1–0	0–2	1–0	2–2	1–1	1–1	1–0	1–0
Botafogo	3–0	—	3–2	2–0	1–1	2–0	3–2	0–0	2–1	2–1	3–2
Comercial	1–0	1–1	—	0–2	1–1	1–1	1–0	1–1	4–0	2–3	0–0
Ferroviária	2–0	4–2	2–0	—	0–2	0–0	2–0	1–0	3–0	3–1	2–1
Guarani	0–1	0–0	1–1	1–1	—	1–0	4–1	0–0	1–0	2–1	2–0
Juventus	1–1	2–0	0–1	1–0	0–0	—	2–1	0–0	2–0	2–1	2–1
Noroeste	3–0	0–4	2–1	0–0	2–0	1–1	—	?	1–1	1–1	2–0
Paulista	2–0	3–1	2–0	3–2	1–1	4–2	1–2	—	6–1	1–1	2–1
Portuguesa Santista	1–1	5–0	2–3	2–0	1–1	1–2	0–0	2–0	—	1–3	3–0
São Bento	2–0	2–1	1–0	2–1	0–1	1–0	0–1	1–0	1–1	—	0–0
XV de Piracicaba	0–2	1–2	1–2	1–1	1–2	0–0	2–1	1–2	1–0	1–0	—

Updated to match(es) played on December 22, 1970. Source: Brfut.blogspot.com Brfut.blogspot.com
Legend: Blue = home team win; Yellow = draw; Red = away team win.

=== Championship proper ===
==== League table ====
Pos	Team	Pld	W	D	L	GF	GA	GD	Pts	Qualification or relegation
1	São Paulo	22	17	2	3	39	17	+22	36	Champions
2	Palmeiras	22	15	3	4	55	22	+33	33	Campeonato Nacional
3	Corinthians	22	10	8	4	36	21	+15	28	Campeonato Nacional
4	Santos	22	10	8	4	36	21	+15	28	Campeonato Nacional
5	Portuguesa	22	12	4	6	40	28	+12	28	Campeonato Nacional
6	Ponte Preta	22	9	4	9	22	19	+3	22	1972 Main Championship
7	Ferroviária	22	7	8	7	31	29	+2	22	1972 Preliminary tournament
8	Guarani	22	5	9	8	22	29	−7	19	1972 Preliminary tournament
9	Juventus	22	6	4	12	21	36	−15	16	1972 Preliminary tournament
10	Botafogo	22	3	7	12	19	38	−19	13	1972 Preliminary tournament
11	Paulista	22	3	5	14	19	37	−18	11	1972 Preliminary tournament
12	São Bento	22	2	4	16	14	48	−34	8	1972 Preliminary tournament

Updated to match(es) played on June 27, 1971. Source: RSSSF.com
Rules for classification: 1) points; 2) goal difference; 3) wins; 4) number of goals scored.

==== Results ====
Home \ Away	BOT	COR	FER	GUA	JUV	PAL	PAU	PON	POR	SAN	SBO	SPO
Botafogo	—	1–1	1–1	1–1	1–0	0–1	0–1	3–2	2–1	1–2	1–1	1–2
Corinthians	1–1	—	3–0	0–0	6–1	4–3	1–0	0–1	3–1	4–2	2–1	1–0
Ferroviária	4–0	2–2	—	1–1	3–2	0–2	1–1	1–0	1–1	4–1	1–0	1–2
Guarani	0–0	2–1	3–2	—	3–1	0–4	1–0	0–1	1–1	0–1	3–1	0–1
Juventus	2–0	1–0	1–1	1–1	—	1–2	1–0	1–0	0–3	1–1	2–0	1–3
Palmeiras	4–2	0–0	2–3	4–1	2–0	—	2–1	4–0	2–1	2–0	7–0	1–2
Paulista	1–0	0–2	2–2	2–2	1–2	1–4	—	1–2	0–5	0–0	2–0	2–3
Ponte Preta	3–0	0–0	0–1	1–0	1–0	1–1	1–1	—	1–0	1–2	5–0	0–1
Portuguesa	3–2	1–0	1–0	1–0	4–1	3–3	2–1	2–1	—	0–1	3–1	3–2
Santos	4–0	3–3	4–0	2–2	1–1	1–2	4–0	0–0	1–1	—	3–1	1–0
São Bento	2–2	0–1	1–1	1–1	2–1	0–3	1–0	0–1	1–2	0–1	—	0–3
São Paulo	1–0	1–1	2–1	2–0	1–0	1–0	4–2	1–0	4–1	0–0	3–1	—

Updated to match(es) played on June 27, 1971. Source: RSSSF.com
Legend: Blue = home team win; Yellow = draw; Red = away team win.

== Top Scores ==
Rank	Player	Club	Goals
1	César Maluco	Palmeiras	18
2	Mirandinha	Corinthians	17
3	Toninho Guerreiro	São Paulo	16
4	Lance	Ferroviaría	15
5	Cabinho	Portuguesa	12
6	Basílio	Portuguesa	10
7	Leivinha	Palmeiras	8
7	Dicá	Ponte Preta	8
