= 1970 Campeonato Paulista =

Campeonato Paulista – Série A1
- Season: 1970
- Champions: São Paulo
- Torneio Roberto Gomes Pedrosa: São Paulo; Palmeiras; Santos; Corinthians; Ponte Preta
- Matches played: 202
- Goals scored: 475 (2.35 per match)
- Top goalscorer: Toninho Guerreiro (São Paulo) – 13 goals
- Biggest home win: Guarani 6-0 Comercial (May 17, 1970)
- Biggest away win: Guarani 2-5 Santos (July 19, 1970); São Bento 0-3 São Paulo (August 30, 1970)
- Highest scoring: Portuguesa Santista 6-1 São Bento (March 15, 1970); Guarani 2-5 Santos (July 19, 1970)

The 1970 Campeonato Paulista da Divisão Especial de Futebol Profissional, organized by the Federação Paulista de Futebol, was the 69th season of São Paulo's top professional football league. São Paulo won the title for the 9th time. No teams were relegated. São Paulo's Toninho Guerreiro was the top scorer with 13 goals.

== Championship ==
In that year, a new format was introduced: a preliminary phase was to be contested before the championship proper, in which the teams played against each other twice and the five best teams qualified into the main championship. That phase was to be disputed in the first semester of 1970, by all the teams except for the "big five": Corinthians, Palmeiras, Portuguesa, São Paulo and Santos, who received a direct bye into the championship proper.

In the championship proper, each team played against the others twice, and the team with the most points won the title.

=== Preliminary phase ===
Pos	Team	Pld	W	D	L	GF	GA	GD	Pts	Qualification or relegation
1	Guarani	20	11	5	4	36	23	+13	27	Qualified
2	Ferroviária	20	10	6	4	29	13	+16	26	Qualified
3	Botafogo	20	8	7	5	24	23	+1	23	Qualified
4	Ponte Preta	20	8	6	6	28	23	+5	22	Playoffs
5	Paulista	20	8	6	6	20	18	+2	22	Playoffs
6	São Bento	20	10	2	8	26	27	−1	22	Playoffs
7	Comercial	20	7	6	7	24	28	−4	20	Eliminated
8	Portuguesa Santista	20	6	6	8	28	27	+1	18	Eliminated
9	América	20	6	3	11	19	32	−13	15	Eliminated
10	Juventus	20	3	7	10	12	22	−10	13	Eliminated
11	XV de Piracicaba	20	3	6	11	21	31	−10	12	Eliminated

Updated to match(es) played on May 24, 1970. Source: Futebolnacional.com
Rules for classification: 1) points; 2) goal difference; 3) wins; 4) number of goals scored.

At the end of the preliminary phase, Paulista, Ponte Preta and São Bento ended up tied in points and had to dispute a playoff to define the two teams that would qualify to the Main championship. Paulista played its matches first and lost both of them, making the third match between Ponte Preta and São Bento unnecessary.

28 May 1970

Paulista	0–2	São Bento
	Report	Patito 33'; Valdir 70', o.g.'

Jayme Cintra, Jundiaí, SP
Referee: Oscar Scolfaro
30 May 1970

Ponte Preta	3–2	Paulista
Dicá 53', 57'; Manfrini 62'	Report	Nenê 17'; Mazzinho 19'

Parque Antarctica, São Paulo, SP
Attendance: 2,594
Referee: José Favilli Neto

=== Championship proper ===
Pos	Team	Pld	W	D	L	GF	GA	GD	Pts	Qualification or relegation
1	São Paulo	18	12	3	3	29	15	+14	27	Champions
2	Palmeiras	18	7	8	3	19	13	+6	22	Torneio Roberto Gomes Pedrosa
3	Ponte Preta	18	7	8	3	17	14	+3	22	Torneio Roberto Gomes Pedrosa
4	Santos	18	8	5	5	34	21	+13	21	Torneio Roberto Gomes Pedrosa
5	Corinthians	18	6	8	4	22	13	+9	20	Torneio Roberto Gomes Pedrosa
6	Portuguesa	18	6	6	6	18	17	+1	18	1971 Main championship
7	Ferroviária	18	6	5	7	14	23	−9	17	1971 Preliminary tournament
8	Guarani	18	4	6	8	19	26	−7	14	1971 Preliminary tournament
9	São Bento	18	3	5	10	15	26	−11	11	1971 Preliminary tournament
10	Botafogo	18	2	4	12	14	33	−19	8	1971 Preliminary tournament

Updated to match(es) played on September 13, 1970. Source: RSSSF.com
Rules for classification: 1) points; 2) goal difference; 3) wins; 4) number of goals scored.

== Top Scores ==
Rank	Player	Club	Goals
1	Toninho Guerreiro	São Paulo	13
2	Douglas	Santos	9
2	César Maluco	Palmeiras	9
4	Pelé	Santos	7
4	Manoel Maria	Santos	7
4	Vágner	Guaraní	7
7	Leivinha	Portuguesa	6
7	Cabinho	Ferroviaría	6
9	Edu	Santos	5
9	Paulo Borges	Corinthians	5
9	Vanderlei	Guaraní	5
9	Manfrini	Ponte Preta	5
