= List of São Paulo FC players =

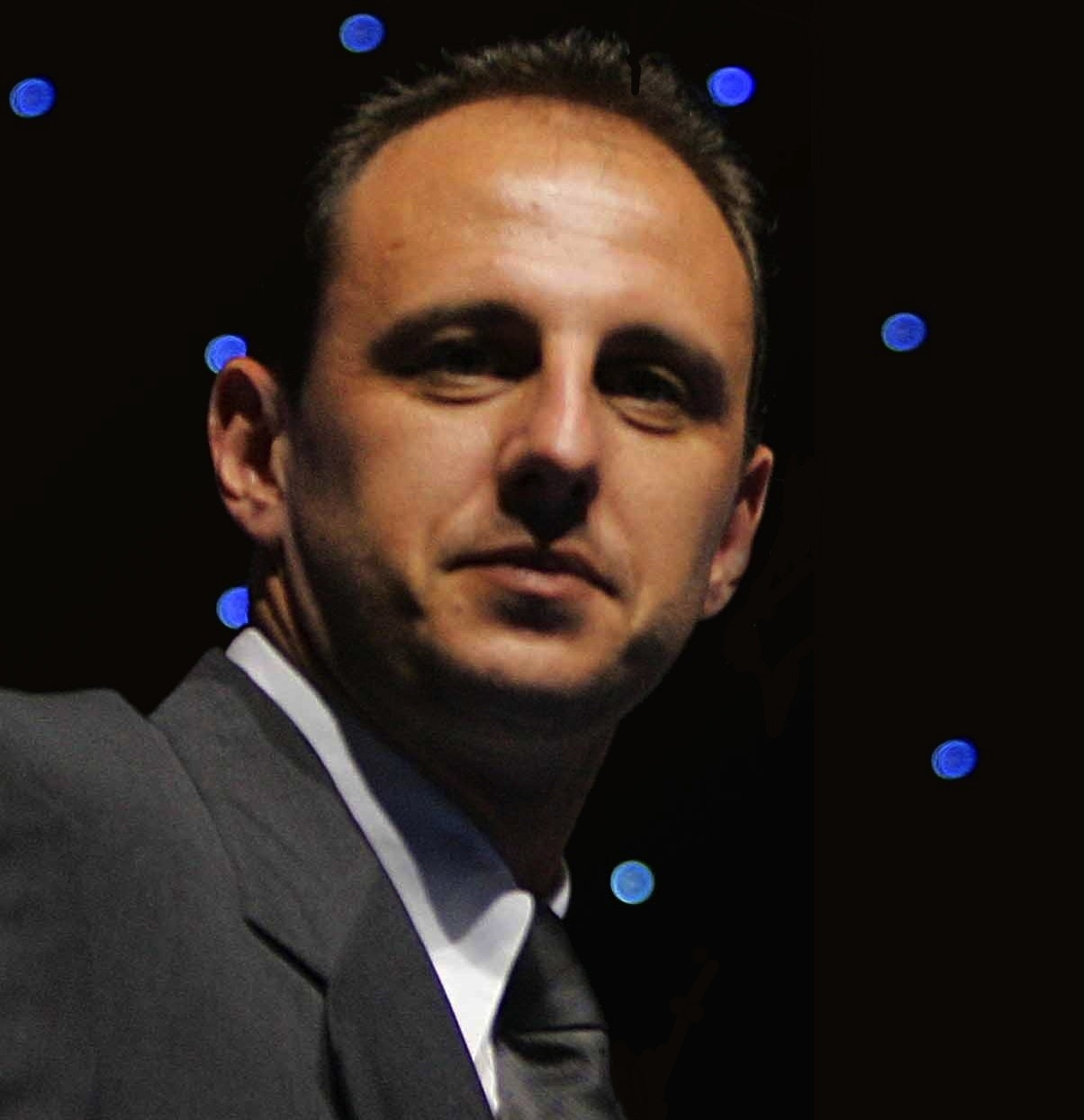
Rogério Ceni holds the record for most appearances for São Paulo.

This is a list of notable, or with at least 100 appearances, footballers who have played for São Paulo FC.

== Players ==
Appearance and goal totals include matches in all competitions and friendly matches.

As of 2021 season

Name	Nationality	Position	São Paulo career	Appearances	Goals
Armandinho	Brazil	FW	1930–1934	149	63
Arthur Friedenreich	Brazil	FW	1930–1935	124	102
Luisinho	Brazil	FW	1930–1935; 1941–1947	263	173
Barthô	Brazil	DF	1930–1935	95	6
Clodô	Brazil	DF	1930–1933	67	0
Siriri	Brazil	FW	1930–1931	46	19
Nestor	Brazil	GK	1930–1931	35	0
Emilio Almiñana	Uruguay	MF	1930–1931	29	1
Milton	Brazil	MF	1930–1935	81	2
Junqueirinha	Brazil	FW	1930–1938	86	24
Bino	Brazil	MF	1930–1932	64	0
Araken Patusca	Brazil	FW	1931–1935; 1938–1939	124	68
Joãozinho	Brazil	GK	1931–1933	33	0
Orozimbo	Brazil	MF	1932–1935; 1940–1941	137	3
Lysandro	Brazil	MF	1932–1942 ¤	85	1
Iracino	Brazil	DF	1933–1941	123	0
Waldemar de Brito	Brazil	FW	1933–1935; 1941–1943	78	85
Hércules	Brazil	FW	1933–1935	54	39
Sylvio Hoffmann	Brazil	DF	1933–1934	37	0
Alberto Zarzur	Brazil	MF	1933–1935; 1942–1947	165	6
Josep Lengyl	Hungary	GK	1933–1934	26	0
Raffa	Brazil	MF	1933–1939	71	0
Agostinho	Brazil	DF	1933–1935; 1938–1940; 1942–1944	84	0
Jurandir	Brazil	GK	1934–1935	17	0
Paulo	Brazil	FW	1935; 1938–1942	99	39
King	Brazil	GK	1936–1938; 1939–1947	204	0
Cozinheiro	Brazil	MF	1936–1938	62	0
Ministrinho	Brazil	FW	1936–1938	70	17
Sidney	Brazil	MF	1936–1938	55	3
Felipelli	Brazil	MF	1936–1940	128	1
Eugênio Chemp	Soviet Union	FW	1936–1941	19	14
Annibal	Brazil	DF	1936–1941	150	0
Carioca	Brazil	FW	1937–1940	83	48
Mário Milani	Brazil	FW	1937–1938	40	22
Caxambu	Brazil	GK	1937–1943	80	0
Pixe	Brazil	FW	1937–1938	48	9
Mendes	Brazil	FW	1938–1942	94	24
Pedrosa	Brazil	GK	1938–1940	32	0
Fiorotti	Brazil	MF	1938–1942	114	3
Elyseo	Brazil	FW	1938–1940	51	36
Euclydes	Brazil	FW	1939	22	19
Carmine	Brazil	FW	1939–1942	62	20
Waldemar Zaclis	Romania	DF	1939–1943	33	0
Teixeirinha	Brazil	FW	1939–1956 ¤	525	188
Remo	Brazil	MF	1940–1951	348	107
Bazzoni	Brazil	FW	1940–1943	73	36
Hemédio	Brazil	FW	1940–1942	63	43
Herculano Squarza	Uruguay	DF	1940–1942	40	0
Lola	Brazil	MF	1940–1944	91	1
Silva	Brazil	MF	1941–1943	50	2
Pardal	Brazil	MF	1941–1948	112	56
Piolim	Brazil	DF	1942–1946	152	0
Florindo	Brazil	DF	1942–1944	66	1
Virgílio	Brazil	DF	1942–1947	98	0
Leônidas da Silva	Brazil	FW	1942–1951	212	144
Noronha	Brazil	DF	1942–1951	298	13
Antonio Sastre	Argentina	MF	1943–1946	128	56
Zezé Procópio	Brazil	MF	1943–1944	48	1
Yeso	Brazil	FW	1943–1948 ¤	79	30
Antoninho	Brazil	FW	1943–1950	53	16
Savério	Brazil	DF	1943–1952	232	0
Américo	Brazil	FW	1943–1947	46	16
Leopoldo	Brazil	FW	1943–1951 ¤	131	56
Rui	Brazil	DF	1944–1953	273	6
Bauer	Brazil	MF	1944–1957 ¤	400	18
Tim	Brazil	FW	1944	14	6
Gijo	Brazil	GK	1944–1949	143	0
Rubén Barrios	Paraguay	FW	1944–1947	98	40
Armando Renganeschi	Argentina	DF	1945–1948	107	1
Jacó	Brazil	MF	1945–1951	74	0
Lelé	Brazil	FW	1946–1949	35	21
China	Brazil	FW	1947–1949	64	35
Mauro Ramos	Brazil	DF	1948–1960	498	2
Mário	Brazil	GK	1948–1952	108	0
Bertolucci	Brazil	GK	1948–1955	88	0
Ponce de León	Brazil	FW	1948–1950	109	52
Friaça	Brazil	MF	1949–1951	66	48
José Poy	Argentina	GK	1949–1962	525	0
Elmo Bovio	Argentina	FW	1950	28	22
Alfredo Ramos	Brazil	DF	1950–1957	322	1
Marin	Brazil	FW	1950–1952	23	6
Augusto	Brazil	FW	1950–1951	67	47
Clélio	Brazil	DF	1950–1958	157	1
Durval	Brazil	FW	1951–1953	74	30
Alcino	Brazil	FW	1951–1953	67	12
Bibe	Brazil	MF	1951–1953; 1959–1960	153	38
Pé de Valsa	Brazil	MF	1951–1956	236	10
Turcão	Brazil	DF	1951–1956	224	35
Nenê	Brazil	FW	1952–1954	41	12
Nicolás Moreno	Argentina	FW	1952–1953	37	7
Gustavo Albella	Argentina	MF	1952–1954	80	46
Maurinho	Brazil	FW	1952–1959	347	136
De Sordi	Brazil	DF	1952–1965	544	0
Gino	Brazil	FW	1953–1963	453	233
Lanzoni	Brazil	FW	1953–1958	147	50
Juan José Negri	Argentina	FW	1953–1955	74	18
Haroldo	Brazil	FW	1953–1955	50	12
Ranulfo	Brazil	FW	1953	22	4
Zezinho	Brazil	FW	1954–1957	85	68
Dino Sani	Brazil	MF	1954–1961	324	113
Victor Ratautas	Brazil	DF	1954–1961	390	8
Canhoteiro	Brazil	FW	1954–1963	413	105
Roque	Brazil	FW	1955–1956	62	7
Paraíba	Brazil	FW	1955–1957	43	19
Sarará	Brazil	MF	1956–1958	71	5
Maneca	Brazil	MF	1956–1959	81	10
Paulo Martorano	Brazil	GK	1956–1959	63	0
Luís Bonelli	Argentina	GK	1956–1957	52	0
Riberto	Brazil	MF	1956–1964	481	19
Roberto Frojuello	Brazil	FW	1956–1961 ¤	153	34
Zizinho	Brazil	MF	1957–1959	67	27
Amaury	Brazil	FW	1957–1961	110	67
Ney Blanco	Brazil	FW	1957–1958	29	17
Sylvio	Brazil	FW	1957–1960	51	2
Celso	Brazil	FW	1957–1960	90	13
Gérsio	Brazil	MF	1958–1961	153	4
Fernando Sátiro	Brazil	MF	1958–1961	93	2
Juracy	Brazil	FW	1958–1960	62	10
Peixinho	Brazil	FW	1959–1961 ¤	63	17
Paulo Lumumba	Brazil	FW	1959–1961	66	30
Paulinho	Brazil	DF	1959–1960	20	0
Neco	Brazil	FW	1959–1960	70	36
Aylton Lataria	Brazil	FW	1960–1962	30	15
Bazzaninho	Brazil	FW	1960–1965	76	11
Gonçalo	Brazil	MF	1960–1962	99	17
Roberto Dias	Brazil	DF	1960–1973 ¤	527	80
Agenor	Brazil	FW	1960–1965	119	29
Vilázio	Brazil	DF	1960–1961	51	0
Jair	Brazil	MF	1961–1963	31	2
Célio	Brazil	MF	1961–1962	57	17
Virgílio	Brazil	DF	1961–1965 ¤	36	0
Benê	Brazil	MF	1961–1968; 1969–1970	265	78
Prado	Brazil	FW	1961–1967	244	121
Suly	Brazil	GK	1961–1966	266	0
Deleu	Brazil	DF	1961–1965	169	0
Faustino	Brazil	FW	1961–1968	231	35
Sabino	Brazil	FW	1961–1964	88	22
Baiano	Brazil	FW	1961–1963	125	61
Geraldo	Brazil	DF	1961	34	0
Cido	Brazil	FW	1962–1963	73	13
Nondas	Brazil	FW	1962–1964	36	18
Bellini	Brazil	DF	1962–1968	214	1
Jurandir	Brazil	DF	1962–1972	419	0
Cecilio Martínez	Paraguay	FW	1963–1965	43	17
Pagão	Brazil	FW	1963–1966	59	14
Leal	Brazil	MF	1963–1964	54	4
Zé Roberto	Brazil	FW	1964–1966; 1969–1976 ¤	155	49
Penachio	Brazil	DF	1964–1967 ¤	24	0
Emanuele Del Vecchio	Brazil	FW	1964–1967	69	17
Wálter Zum-Zum	Brazil	FW	1964–1970	86	12
Nenê	Brazil	MF	1964–1973	263	22
Marco Antônio	Brazil	MF	1964–1965	47	19
Valdir Birigui	Brazil	FW	1964–1966	64	21
Renato	Brazil	DF	1965–1968	120	11
Paraná	Brazil	FW	1965–1973	396	40
Tenente	Brazil	DF	1965–1972	181	3
Osvaldo Cunha	Brazil	DF	1965–1967	77	1
Sérgio Valentim	Brazil	GK	1966–1975	202	0
Cláudio Deodato	Brazil	DF	1966–1970	81	0
Babá	Brazil	FW	1966–1970	216	94
Fábio	Brazil	GK	1966–1967	43	0
Adílson	Brazil	MF	1966–1968	40	22
Carlos Alberto	Brazil	MF	1966–1972	130	8
Edílson	Brazil	DF	1967–1969	58	0
Nelsinho	Brazil	FW	1967–1970	71	16
Lourival	Brazil	DF	1967-1970	112	18
Picasso	Brazil	GK	1967–1971	163	0
Lima	Brazil	DF	1968–1972	60	0
Eduardo	Brazil	DF	1968–1970	42	0
Miruca	Brazil	FW	1968–1970	75	15
Terto	Brazil	FW	1968–1977	500	86
Arlindo	Brazil	DF	1968–1969; 1971–1977	406	4
Toninho	Brazil	FW	1968–1972	64	1
Téia	Brazil	FW	1968–1971	61	19
Gérson	Brazil	MF	1969–1972	75	11
Édson Cegonha	Brazil	DF	1969-1973	205	16
Toninho Guerreiro	Brazil	FW	1969–1974	170	86
Gilberto Sorriso	Brazil	DF	1970–1977 ¤	434	7
Pablo Forlán	Uruguay	DF	1970–1975	243	9
Pedro Rocha	Uruguay	MF	1970–1979	393	119
Everaldo	Brazil	FW	1970–1974 ¤	58	10
Paulo Nani	Brazil	FW	1970–1974 ¤	139	8
Nélson	Brazil	DF	1971–1977	267	5
Samuel	Brazil	DF	1971–1975	105	0
Teodoro	Brazil	MF	1971–1980; 1982	303	13
Jésum	Brazil	FW	1972–1975	50	2
Zé Carlos	Brazil	MF	1972–1977	267	30
Chicão	Brazil	MF	1973–1979	318	19
Waldir Peres	Brazil	GK	1973–1984	617	0
Muricy	Brazil	MF	1973–1979 ¤	185	28
Paranhos	Brazil	DF	1973–1977	238	0
Piau	Brazil	FW	1973–1977	155	9
Osmar Rodrigues	Brazil	DF	1973–1979	39	0
Mauro Madureira	Brazil	FW	1973–1976 ¤	99	15
Mirandinha	Brazil	FW	1973–1979	103	50
Antônio Silva	Brazil	MF	1973–1978 ¤	93	8
Paschoalin	Brazil	GK	1973–1976	29	0
Ademir	Brazil	MF	1974–1977	138	9
Serginho Chulapa	Brazil	FW	1974–1983	399	242
Milton Cruz	Brazil	FW	1975–1979 ¤	55	28
Peres	Brazil	MF	1975–1979 ¤	70	0
Viana	Brazil	MF	1975–1980 ¤	116	4
Tecão	Brazil	DF	1975–1979	101	2
Zé Sérgio	Brazil	FW	1976–1984 ¤	353	48
Valtinho	Brazil	FW	1976–1981 ¤	79	7
Bezerra	Brazil	DF	1976–1980	207	11
Mickey	Brazil	FW	1976–1978	45	17
Müller	Brazil	FW	1976–1978	65	9
Heriberto	Brazil	MF	1977–1983	198	8
Jaiminho	Brazil	FW	1977–1984 ¤	98	9
Zizinho	Brazil	MF	1977–1980 ¤	21	4
Getúlio	Brazil	DF	1977–1984	325	36
Darío Pereyra	Uruguay	DF	1977–1988	453	37
Estevam	Brazil	DF	1977–1979	109	1
Toinho	Brazil	GK	1977–1982	131	0
Zequinha	Brazil	FW	1977–1979	60	3
Jayme	Brazil	DF	1977–1980	59	0
Antenor	Brazil	DF	1977–1980	104	3
Mário Válter	Brazil	DF	1977–1979	21	1
Neca	Brazil	MF	1977–1979	107	29
Edu Bala	Brazil	MF	1978–1980	148	14
Armando	Brazil	MF	1978–1979	32	4
Márcio Araújo	Brazil	MF	1978–1981; 1983–1986 ¤	188	6
Marião	Brazil	DF	1978–1980	50	2
Tatu	Brazil	FW	1978–1982 ¤	73	13
Mug	Brazil	FW	1979	22	3
Luís Müller	Brazil	FW	1979–1980 ¤	30	2
Aírton	Brazil	DF	1979–1981 ¤	97	0
Aílton	Brazil	MF	1980	29	9
Almir	Brazil	MF	1980–1983	195	2
Gassem	Brazil	DF	1980–1984	201	2
Assis	Brazil	FW	1980–1981	89	16
Renato	Brazil	MF	1980–1984	299	100
Oscar	Brazil	DF	1980–1987	293	15
Ney Roz	Brazil	DF	1980–1981	105	1
Paulo César	Brazil	FW	1980–1984	261	37
Barbirotto	Brazil	GK	1981–1985	55	0
Marinho Chagas	Brazil	DF	1981–1983	70	2
Mário Sérgio	Brazil	MF	1981–1983	62	8
Nelsinho	Brazil	DF	1981–1991 ¤	512	9
Chiquito	Brazil	DF	1981	33	1
Everton	Brazil	MF	1981–1982	153	42
Sídney	Brazil	FW	1982–1988	200	17
Boni	Brazil	DF	1982–1984 ¤	35	0
Edel	Brazil	DF	1982–1985	22	3
Paulo Luís	Brazil	DF	1982–1983	42	2
Agnaldo	Brazil	FW	1983–1985	87	18
Humberto	Brazil	MF	1983–1984	58	4
Zé Mário	Brazil	MF	1983–1984	94	4
Careca	Brazil	FW	1983–1987	191	115
Müller	Brazil	FW	1984–1987; 1991–1994; 1996 ¤	387	160
Pita	Brazil	MF	1984–1988	249	47
Paulo Roberto	Brazil	DF	1984	50	1
Casagrande	Brazil	FW	1984	23	11
Abelha	Brazil	GK	1984–1985	31	0
Geraldo Touro	Brazil	FW	1984–1985	60	5
Vizolli	Brazil	MF	1984–1991	84	4
Pianelli	Brazil	FW	1984–1987	120	21
Fonseca	Brazil	DF	1984–1989	125	3
Musashi Mizushima	Japan	DF	1985	1	0
Rúben Fürtenbach	Uruguay	DF	1985–1986	23	0
Falcão	Brazil	MF	1985-1986	15	1
Renatinho	Brazil	MF	1985-1990	87	14
Éder Taino	Brazil	DF	1985-1987	76	2
Silas	Brazil	MF	1985–1988; 1997 ¤	170	35
Gilmar Rinaldi	Brazil	GK	1985–1991	253	0
Zé Teodoro	Brazil	DF	1985–1991	264	7
Pintado	Brazil	MF	1985; 1992–1993	118	2
Manu	Brazil	MF	1986–1989 ¤	76	14
Betinho	Brazil	MF	1986–1990 ¤	31	4
Marcelo Veridiano	Brazil	FW	1986–1989 ¤	41	9
Wagner Basílio	Brazil	DF	1986–1988	96	4
Ronaldão	Brazil	DF	1986–1993 ¤	302	13
Adilson	Brazil	DF	1986–1993	266	2
Bernardo	Brazil	MF	1986–1991	240	17
Edivaldo	Brazil	MF	1987–1989	123	26
Lê	Brazil	MF	1987–1988	103	24
Ney Bala	Brazil	FW	1987–1990	77	12
Roberto Rojas	Chile	GK	1987–1989	40	0
Paulo Martins	Brazil	MF	1987–1988	38	0
Raí	Brazil	MF	1987–1993; 1998–2000	395	128
Neto	Brazil	MF	1987	32	5
Anílton	Brazil	FW	1988–1993 ¤	51	4
Ivan	Brazil	DF	1988–1992 ¤	144	12
Flávio	Brazil	MF	1988–1991	131	7
Mazinho Loyola	Brazil	FW	1988–1989	30	8
Paulo César	Brazil	FW	1988–1990 ¤	74	8
Netinho	Brazil	DF	1988–1989	27	0
Mário Tilico	Brazil	FW	1988–1991	116	23
Benê	Brazil	MF	1989 ¤	28	2
Bobô	Brazil	MF	1989–1990	63	11
Cláudio Moura	Brazil	FW	1989–1995 ¤	45	12
Cafu	Brazil	DF	1989–1994 ¤	272	38
Ricardo Rocha	Brazil	DF	1989–1991	70	0
Elivélton	Brazil	MF	1989–1993 ¤	149	12
Diego Aguirre	Uruguay	FW	1990	17	7
Juan Ramón Carrasco	Uruguay	MF	1990	14	2
Antônio Carlos	Brazil	DF	1990–1992 ¤	143	10
Leonardo	Brazil	MF	1990–1991; 1993–1994; 2001	111	17
Zetti	Brazil	GK	1990–1996	432	0
Vítor	Brazil	DF	1990–1994; 1996	149	3
Rogério Ceni	Brazil	GK	1990–2015 ¤	1237	131
Alexandre	Brazil	GK	1991–1992 ¤	8	0
Rinaldo	Brazil	FW	1991–1992	32	5
Macedo	Brazil	FW	1991–1993	112	21
Doriva	Brazil	MF	1991–1994 ¤	91	1
Suélio	Brazil	MF	1991–1993	64	1
Gilmar	Brazil	DF	1991–1996	150	5
Sídnei	Brazil	MF	1991–1995 ¤	74	1
Eraldo	Brazil	MF	1991–1992 ¤	23	2
Pavão	Brazil	DF	1991–1995 ¤	73	1
Mona	Brazil	MF	1992–1996 ¤	65	0
Marcos Adriano	Brazil	DF	1992–1993	47	0
Lula	Brazil	DF	1992–1993	32	2
Toninho Cerezo	Brazil	MF	1992–1993; 1995–1996	72	7
Palhinha	Brazil	FW	1992–1995	232	71
Ronaldo Luiz	Brazil	DF	1992–1995	109	1
Catê	Brazil	FW	1992–1995; 1997	136	23
Dinho	Brazil	MF	1992–1993	114	12
Válber	Brazil	DF	1992–1994; 1996–1997	158	5
Jura	Brazil	DF	1993	20	1
Nelson	Brazil	DF	1993–1995 ¤	37	0
André Luiz	Brazil	DF	1993–1997 ¤	195	18
Gustavo Matosas	Uruguay	MF	1993	19	5
Murilo	Brazil	DF	1993–1995	57	1
Gilberto	Brazil	GK	1993	17	0
Emerson Pereira	Brazil	MF	1993–1995 ¤	36	3
Luís Carlos Goiano	Brazil	MF	1993	16	0
Jamelli	Brazil	FW	1993–1994 ¤	41	7
Guilherme	Brazil	FW	1993–1994 ¤	46	18
Juninho Paulista	Brazil	MF	1993–1995	141	22
Euller	Brazil	FW	1994	55	15
José Luis Sierra	Chile	MF	1994–1995	43	3
Alemão	Brazil	MF	1994–1995	80	2
Axel	Brazil	MF	1994–1997; 2000	176	3
Bordon	Brazil	DF	1994–1999 ¤	238	8
Aílton	Brazil	MF	1994–1996	76	26
Júnior Baiano	Brazil	DF	1994–1995	81	11
Denílson	Brazil	FW	1994–1998 ¤	192	26
Caio	Brazil	FW	1994–1995 ¤	95	33
Cláudio	Brazil	DF	1995–1998	113	1
Almir	Brazil	FW	1995–1996	46	18
Moscatto	Brazil	GK	1995	2	1
Bentinho	Brazil	FW	1995	40	22
Amarildo	Brazil	FW	1995	15	3
Sidney	Brazil	MF	1995–2001 ¤	75	1
Donizete	Brazil	MF	1995–1996	72	1
Pedro Luís	Brazil	DF	1995–1997	64	3
Rogério Pinheiro	Brazil	DF	1995; 1997–2001	177	8
Nem	Brazil	DF	1995–1999 ¤	98	3
Dodô	Brazil	FW	1995; 1997–1999	169	93
Edmílson	Brazil	DF	1995–2000 ¤	253	19
França	Brazil	FW	1996–2002	327	182
Víctor Aristizábal	Colombia	FW	1996–1998	81	37
Belletti	Brazil	DF	1996–1998; 2000–2002	207	15
Serginho	Brazil	DF	1996–1999	179	28
Adriano	Brazil	MF	1996–1999; 2001–2003	122	26
Fabiano	Brazil	MF	1996–2001 ¤	142	20
Gabriel Mendoza	Chile	DF	1996	12	0
Marquinhos Capixaba	Brazil	DF	1996	22	0
Guilherme	Brazil	DF	1996	22	2
Edinho	Brazil	DF	1996	22	0
Sorlei	Brazil	DF	1996	22	0
Sandoval	Brazil	FW	1996–1998	40	8
Valdir	Brazil	FW	1996–1997	71	31
Alexandre Gallo	Brazil	MF	1997–1998	41	2
Alberto	Brazil	DF	1997	19	0
Néstor Isasi	Paraguay	DF	1997–1999	12	0
Luiz Carlos	Brazil	MF	1997	46	3
Reinaldo	Brazil	MF	1997–2001	60	6
Marcelinho Paraíba	Brazil	MF	1997–2000; 2010–2011	210	51
Roger	Brazil	GK	1997–1999; 2001–2005	54	0
Márcio Santos	Brazil	DF	1997–1999	94	5
Zé Carlos	Brazil	DF	1997–1999	72	2
Álvaro	Brazil	DF	1997–1998; 2000 ¤	45	2
Fábio Aurélio	Brazil	DF	1997–2000 ¤	135	6
Alexandre	Brazil	MF	1997–2001; 2003–2004	216	2
Capitão	Brazil	MF	1998–1999	62	0
Carlos Miguel	Brazil	MF	1998–2001	187	18
Souza	Brazil	MF	1998–2002	166	19
Emerson	Brazil	FW	1998–1999	19	2
Edu	Brazil	MF	1998–2000 ¤	57	12
Wilson	Brazil	DF	1999–2002	137	11
Sandro Hiroshi	Brazil	FW	1999–2002	89	17
Paulão	Brazil	DF	1999–2000	33	0
Jorginho	Brazil	DF	1999	55	2
Warley	Brazil	FW	1999	26	6
Vágner	Brazil	MF	1999–2000	54	4
Héctor Carabalí	Ecuador	MF	1999	19	0
Ricardinho	Brazil	MF	1999–2000	15	0
Ânderson Lima	Brazil	DF	1999	25	2
Fábio Simplício	Brazil	MF	2000–2004 ¤	237	26
Gustavo Nery	Brazil	DF	2000–2004	209	31
Júlio Baptista	Brazil	MF	2000–2003 ¤	138	22
Evair	Brazil	FW	2000	31	9
Claudio Maldonado	Chile	MF	2000–2003	99	3
Jean	Brazil	DF	2000–2003 ¤	180	10
Pimentel	Brazil	DF	2000	30	0
Alencar	Brazil	GK	2000–2001	5	0
Beto	Brazil	MF	2000	20	3
Celso Ayala	Paraguay	DF	2000	8	0
Ilan	Brazil	FW	2000–2001	31	4
Marcelo Ramos	Brazil	FW	2000	27	13
Renatinho	Brazil	FW	2001 ¤	11	2
Oliveira	Brazil	FW	2001–2003 ¤	18	0
Harison	Brazil	MF	2000–2001 ¤	11	0
Kaká	Brazil	MF	2001–2003; 2014 ¤	155	51
Luís Fabiano	Brazil	FW	2001–2004; 2011–2015	352	212
Fabiano Souza	Brazil	FW	2001	9	1
Émerson	Brazil	DF	2001–2002	54	1
Júlio Santos	Brazil	DF	2001–2003 ¤	64	2
Lino	Brazil	DF	2001–2004	32	1
Gabriel	Brazil	DF	2001–2004 ¤	112	9
Dill	Brazil	FW	2001–2003	22	2
Reginaldo Araújo	Brazil	DF	2001	43	2
Reginaldo	Brazil	DF	2001–2002	28	3
Régis	Brazil	DF	2002–2003	24	1
Lúcio Flávio	Brazil	MF	2002	21	0
Jorginho Paulista	Brazil	DF	2002–2003	27	2
Reinaldo	Brazil	FW	2002–2003	81	39
Horacio Ameli	Argentina	DF	2002	15	1
Diego Lugano	Uruguay	DF	2002–2006; 2016–2017	213	13
Ricardinho	Brazil	MF	2002–2003	63	5
Rico	Brazil	FW	2002–2004	37	7
Souza	Brazil	MF	2003–2008	232	35
Adriano	Brazil	MF	2003–2004	63	1
Fabiano	Brazil	DF	2003	59	4
Léo Moura	Brazil	DF	2003	40	1
Fábio Santos	Brazil	DF	2003–2006 ¤	93	2
Diego Tardelli	Brazil	FW	2003–2005; 2007 ¤	140	39
Kléber	Brazil	FW	2003 ¤	46	10
Marco Antônio	Brazil	MF	2003–2007 ¤	52	6
Edcarlos	Brazil	DF	2003–2007 ¤	135	5
Carlos Alberto	Brazil	MF	2003	40	2
Jean Carlos	Brazil	FW	2004–2005	42	2
Alexander Rondón	Venezuela	FW	2004	11	0
Nildo	Brazil	FW	2004	12	2
Vélber	Brazil	MF	2004–2007	59	3
Grafite	Brazil	FW	2004–2006	98	40
Cicinho	Brazil	DF	2004–2005; 2010	151	21
Marquinhos	Brazil	MF	2004	28	5
Danilo	Brazil	MF	2004–2006	194	37
Fabão	Brazil	DF	2004–2006	171	15
Rodrigo	Brazil	DF	2004–2005; 2008–2009	111	10
Renan	Brazil	MF	2004–2005 ¤	79	1
Alê	Brazil	MF	2004–2006 ¤	56	0
Hernanes	Brazil	MF	2004–2005; 2007–2010; 2017; 2019–2021 ¤	330	56
Ramalho	Brazil	MF	2004–2006	31	0
César Sampaio	Brazil	MF	2004	27	1
Alex Bruno	Brazil	DF	2004–2006	58	0
Júnior	Brazil	DF	2004–2008	198	11
Luizão	Brazil	FW	2005	28	11
Falcão	Brazil	FW	2005	7	0
Mineiro	Brazil	MF	2005–2006	126	14
Josué	Brazil	MF	2005–2007	157	7
Amoroso	Brazil	FW	2005	30	18
Thiago Ribeiro	Brazil	FW	2005–2007	77	19
Roger Silva	Brazil	FW	2005–2010	31	6
Denílson	Brazil	MF	2005–2006; 2011–2015 ¤	212	1
Richarlyson	Brazil	MF	2005–2010	244	12
Jean	Brazil	MF	2005; 2008–2011 ¤	205	12
Christian	Brazil	FW	2005	22	8
Aloísio	Brazil	FW	2005–2008	124	23
Leandro	Brazil	FW	2006–2007	116	16
Alex Dias	Brazil	FW	2006	49	6
Bosco	Brazil	GK	2006–2010	43	0
Lúcio	Brazil	DF	2006	11	0
Neicer Reasco	Ecuador	DF	2006–2008	25	0
André Dias	Brazil	DF	2006–2010	197	11
Alex Silva	Brazil	DF	2006–2008; 2010–2011	143	12
Miranda	Brazil	DF	2006–2011	260	10
Ilsinho	Brazil	DF	2006–2007; 2010–2011	82	9
Ricardo Oliveira	Brazil	FW	2006; 2010	29	14
Lenílson	Brazil	MF	2006–2007	54	14
Borges	Brazil	FW	2007–2009	150	54
Hugo	Brazil	MF	2007–2009	139	30
Zé Luís	Brazil	MF	2007–2009	93	1
Jorge Wagner	Brazil	MF	2007–2010	209	22
Dagoberto	Brazil	FW	2007–2011	241	61
Fredson	Brazil	MF	2007	10	0
Aislan	Brazil	DF	2007–2008 ¤	13	0
Jadílson	Brazil	DF	2007	29	2
Marcel	Brazil	FW	2007	14	3
Sérgio Mota	Brazil	MF	2007–2010 ¤	14	0
Breno	Brazil	DF	2007; 2015–2017 ¤	54	3
Wellington	Brazil	MF	2008–2014; 2016–2017 ¤	177	2
Oscar	Brazil	MF	2008–2009 ¤	14	0
Juninho	Brazil	DF	2008	20	1
Éder Luís	Brazil	FW	2008	35	5
André Lima	Brazil	FW	2008–2009	29	6
Carlos Alberto	Brazil	MF	2008	13	1
Fábio Santos	Brazil	MF	2008	24	1
Éder Sciola	Brazil	DF	2008	15	0
Jancarlos	Brazil	DF	2008	16	1
Joílson	Brazil	DF	2008–2009	56	1
Adriano	Brazil	FW	2008	28	17
Washington	Brazil	FW	2009–2010	86	45
Júnior César	Brazil	DF	2009–2011	100	1
Henrique Almeida	Brazil	FW	2009–2011 ¤	31	4
Adrián González	Argentina	DF	2009–2010	9	0
Eduardo Costa	Brazil	MF	2009	18	0
Denis	Brazil	GK	2009–2017	173	0
Marlos	Brazil	MF	2009–2011	135	13
Renato Silva	Brazil	DF	2009–2011	79	2
Arouca	Brazil	MF	2009	41	0
André Luís	Brazil	DF	2010	6	1
Xandão	Brazil	DF	2010–2011	77	1
Fernandinho	Brazil	FW	2010–2012	104	17
Fernandão	Brazil	FW	2010–2011	39	8
Léo Lima	Brazil	MF	2010	19	0
Cléber Santana	Brazil	MF	2010–2011	48	3
Rodrigo Souto	Brazil	MF	2010–2011	73	3
Carlinhos Paraíba	Brazil	MF	2010–2011	79	2
Casemiro	Brazil	MF	2010–2013 ¤	111	11
Lucas	Brazil	MF	2010–2012 ¤	128	33
Lucas Gaúcho	Brazil	FW	2010 ¤	5	2
Carleto	Brazil	DF	2010–2012	23	1
Juan	Brazil	DF	2011–2013 ¤	69	4
Rhodolfo	Brazil	DF	2011–2013	139	11
Rodrigo Caio	Brazil	DF	2011–2018 ¤	277	13
João Filipe	Brazil	DF	2011–2013	46	0
Rivaldo	Brazil	MF	2011	46	7
Cícero	Brazil	MF	2011–2012; 2017	124	20
Willian José	Brazil	FW	2011–2012	66	16
Luiz Eduardo	Brazil	DF	2011–2015 ¤	18	0
Marcelo Cañete	Argentina	MF	2011–2014	23	1
Ivan Piris	Paraguay	DF	2011–2012	42	1
Edson Silva	Brazil	DF	2012–2015	118	7
Maicon	Brazil	MF	2012–2015	161	9
Paulo Miranda	Brazil	DF	2012–2015	138	5
Paulo Assunção	Brazil	MF	2012	11	0
Cortez	Brazil	DF	2012–2013	91	2
Ademilson	Brazil	FW	2012–2015 ¤	114	15
Jádson	Brazil	MF	2012–2014	122	21
Osvaldo	Brazil	FW	2012–2014	161	20
Douglas	Brazil	DF	2012–2014	132	6
Rafael Toloi	Brazil	DF	2012–2015	133	6
Paulo Henrique Ganso	Brazil	MF	2012–2016	221	24
João Schmidt	Brazil	MF	2012–2017 ¤	74	2
Lucas Evangelista	Brazil	MF	2012–2013 ¤	33	2
Silvinho	Brazil	FW	2013	13	0
Lúcio	Brazil	DF	2013	32	2
Aloísio	Brazil	FW	2013	71	22
Antônio Carlos	Brazil	DF	2013–2015	63	12
Lucão	Brazil	DF	2013–2017 ¤	92	2
Caramelo	Brazil	DF	2013–2016	21	0
Clemente Rodríguez	Argentina	DF	2013	3	0
Reinaldo	Brazil	DF	2013–2015; 2018–	319	24
Welliton	Brazil	FW	2013	19	4
Ewandro	Brazil	FW	2014–2015 ¤	22	2
Boschilia	Brazil	MF	2014–2015 ¤	45	5
Dorlan Pabón	Colombia	FW	2014	18	2
Álvaro Pereira	Uruguay	DF	2014	45	1
Alexandre Pato	Brazil	FW	2014–2015; 2019–2020	136	47
Luis Ricardo	Brazil	DF	2014	17	1
Auro	Brazil	DF	2014–2016 ¤	36	0
Hudson	Brazil	MF	2014–2016; 2018–2019	198	6
Souza	Brazil	MF	2014–2015	78	7
Alan Kardec	Brazil	FW	2014–2016	95	25
Michel Bastos	Brazil	MF	2014–2016	123	22
Wesley	Brazil	MF	2015–2017	83	2
Ricardo Centurión	Argentina	FW	2015–2016	81	8
Renan Ribeiro	Brazil	GK	2015–2017	44	0
Dória	Brazil	DF	2015	18	2
Bruno	Brazil	DF	2015–2018	123	0
Thiago Mendes	Brazil	MF	2015–2017	147	11
Carlinhos	Brazil	DF	2015–2016	65	2
Luiz Eduardo	Brazil	DF	2015	9	1
Wilder Guisao	Colombia	FW	2015–2016	14	1
Rogério	Brazil	FW	2015–2016	33	7
Pedro Bortoluzo	Brazil	FW	2016–2018 ¤	22	4
Luiz Araújo	Brazil	FW	2016–2017 ¤	51	9
Maicon Roque	Brazil	DF	2016–2017	74	5
Kelvin	Brazil	FW	2016	43	3
Eugenio Mena	Chile	DF	2016	46	0
Christian Cueva	Peru	MF	2016–2018	89	20
Andrés Chávez	Argentina	FW	2016–2017	35	12
Julio Buffarini	Argentina	DF	2016–2017	40	0
Felipe Araruna	Brazil	MF	2016–2019 ¤	57	0
Guilherme Bissoli	Brazil	FW	2016–2019 ¤	17	5
David Neres	Brazil	FW	2016 ¤	11	3
Lucas Kal	Brazil	MF	2016–2019 ¤	14	0
Lucas Fernandes	Brazil	MF	2016–2018 ¤	53	2
Lucas Perri	Brazil	GK	2016–2021 ¤	30	0
Éder Militão	Brazil	DF	2016–2018 ¤	68	6
Brenner	Brazil	FW	2017–2021 ¤	74	27
Rodrigo	Brazil	DF	2017–2021 ¤	18	1
Jucilei	Brazil	MF	2017–2019	108	1
Sidão	Brazil	GK	2017–2018	73	0
Shaylon	Brazil	MF	2017–2021 ¤	62	5
Júnior Tavares	Brazil	DF	2017–2018 ¤	59	0
Edimar	Brazil	DF	2017–2018	42	0
**Robert Arboleda**	Ecuador	DF	2017–	188	13
Bruno Alves	Brazil	DF	2017–2022	189	6
Jonathan Gómez	Argentina	MF	2017–2019	15	0
Wellington Nem	Brazil	FW	2017	25	1
Marcinho	Brazil	FW	2017	22	2
Thomaz	Brazil	MF	2017	19	2
Petros	Brazil	MF	2017–2018	52	1
Paulinho Bóia	Brazil	FW	2017–2021 ¤	37	1
Gilberto	Brazil	FW	2017–2018	45	15
Lucas Pratto	Argentina	FW	2017	48	14
Gonzalo Carneiro	Uruguay	FW	2018–2021	34	2
Everton Felipe	Brazil	FW	2018–2021	22	0
Valdívia	Brazil	FW	2018	19	3
Diego Souza	Brazil	FW	2018–2019	61	17
Nenê	Brazil	MF	2018–2019	74	13
Santiago Tréllez	Colombia	FW	2018–2021	52	6
Everton	Brazil	FW	2018–2020	70	8
Joao Rojas	Ecuador	FW	2018–2021	51	5
Helinho	Brazil	FW	2018–2020 ¤	37	2
Antony	Brazil	FW	2018–2020 ¤	52	6
Jean	Brazil	GK	2018–2019	21	0
Anderson Martins	Brazil	DF	2018–2020	57	2
Bruno Peres	Brazil	DF	2018–2019	28	1
Pablo	Brazil	FW	2019–2022	121	32
Tiago Volpi	Brazil	GK	2019–	188	0
Tchê Tchê	Brazil	MF	2019–2022	98	6
Vitor Bueno	Brazil	MF	2019–2022	120	16
Dani Alves	Brazil	DF	2019–2021	95	10
Juanfran	Spain	DF	2019–2021	56	0
Antonio Galeano	Paraguay	FW	2020–2021	29	1
Martín Benítez	Argentina	MF	2021	42	4

Bold – Currently playing for São Paulo
¤ – Started the career at São Paulo

Credits to Almanaque do São Paulo (by Placar and Alexandre Costa)
