= Adílson =

Adílson is a Portuguese-language given name.

Notable people with the name include:

- Adílson Alves Moreira (born 1943), Brazilian football midfielder
- Adilson da Silva (born 1972), Brazilian professional golfer in South Africa
- Adílson dos Santos (born 1976), Brazilian footballer
- Adilson E. Motter (born 1974), Brazilian-born American-based scientist working at Northwestern University
- Adílson Ferreira de Souza (born 1978), Brazilian footballer
- Adílson José Pinto (born 1965), Brazilian football defender
- Adilson Nascimento (1951–2009), Brazilian basketball player
- Adílson Rodrigues "Maguila" (born 1958), former Brazilian heavyweight boxer
- Adilson Soares Cassamá (born 1983), Guinea-Bissauan football (soccer) midfielder
- Adilson Tavares Varela (born 1988), Cape Verdean-Swiss footballer
- Adilson Tibes Granemann (born 1982), Brazilian footballer
- Adílson Warken, Brazilian footballer
- Adílson Cândido de Souza, Brazilian football goalkeeper
- Adílson Dias Batista, Brazilian footballer
- Adílson Luíz Anastácio, Brazilian footballer
- Adilson (Portuguese footballer), Portuguese footballer

Additionally in the Portuguese language Wikipedia:

- pt:Adílson Alves da Silva "Mestre Adílson" (1952), Brazilian capoeirista
- pt:Adílson Ramos (1945), Brazilian singer
- pt:Adílson Heleno, Brazilian footballer
- pt:Adilson Marques, Brazilian spiritualist
- pt:Adílson Soares, Brazilian politician
- pt:Adilson Marcelino Alves, Brazilian criminal
- pt:Adilsom Antônio Martins, Brazilian spiritualist
