= 1980 São Paulo FC season =

São Paulo
1980 season
- Chairman: Antônio Leme Nunes Galvão
- Manager: Carlos Alberto Silva
- Campeonato Brasileiro Série A: 9th
- Campeonato Paulista: Champions (12th title)
- Top goalscorer: League: Serginho (12); All: Serginho (26)

The 1980 season was São Paulo's 51st season since club's existence.

== Statistics ==
=== Scorers ===
Position	Nation	Playing position	Name	Campeonato Brasileiro	Campeonato Paulista	Others	Total
1	(Brazil)	FW	Serginho	12	13	1	26
2	(Brazil)	DF	Getúlio	5	7	1	13
=	(Brazil)	FW	Zé Sérgio	4	7	2	13
3	(Brazil)	FW	Assis	2	7	3	12
4	(Brazil)	MF	Renato	5	5	1	11
5	(Brazil)	MF	Aílton Lira	4	3	2	9
6	(Brazil)	FW	Paulo César	0	5	0	5
7	(Brazil)	MF	Zizinho	1	2	0	3
8	(Brazil)	MF	Teodoro	2	0	0	2
9	(Uruguay)	DF	Darío Pereyra	0	1	0	1
=	(Brazil)	FW	Edu Bala	0	0	1	1
=	(Brazil)	MF	Heriberto	0	1	0	1
=	(Brazil)	DF	Marião	0	1	0	1
=	(Brazil)	DF	Ney	0	1	0	1
=	(Brazil)	FW	Tatu	0	1	0	1
			Own goals	1	1	1	3
			Total	36	55	12	103

=== Managers performance ===
Name	Nationality	From	To	P	W	D	L	GF	GA	%
Carlos Alberto Silva	Brazil	26 January	19 November	68	33	23	12	103	60	65%

=== Overall ===
Games played	71 (44 Campeonato Paulista, 18 Campeonato Brasileiro, 9 Friendly match)
Games won	34 (22 Campeonato Paulista, 8 Campeonato Brasileiro, 4 Friendly match)
Games drawn	24 (13 Campeonato Paulista, 8 Campeonato Brasileiro, 3 Friendly match)
Games lost	13 (9 Campeonato Paulista, 2 Campeonato Brasileiro, 2 Friendly match)
Goals scored	106
Goals conceded	63
Goal difference	+43
Best result	4–0 (A) v Palmeiras - Friendly match - 1980.08.05; 4–0 (H) v Corinthians - Campeonato Paulista - 1980.08.10
Worst result	1–3 (H) v Internacional - Friendly match - 1980.02.13; 1–3 (H) v Guarani - Campeonato Paulista - 1980.10.08
Top scorer	Serginho Chulapa (26)

Source: São Paulo FC

== Friendlies ==
Jan 26 Troféu Anos de Ouro	São Paulo	0–0	Flamengo	São Paulo
				Stadium: Estádio Cícero Pompeu de Toledo (Morumbi); Attendance: 43,077; Referee: Roberto Nunes Morgado

Feb 3 National	Atlético Mineiro	1–1	São Paulo	Belo Horizonte
	Éder 29'		Assis 18'	Stadium: Estádio Governador Magalhães Pinto (Mineirão); Attendance: 44,418; Referee: Alvimar Reis

Feb 9 National	São Paulo	2–0	Atlético Mineiro	São Paulo
	Toninho Cerezo 35' (o.g.); Assis 87'			Stadium: Estádio Cícero Pompeu de Toledo (Morumbi); Referee: José Guidotti

Feb 13 National	São Paulo	1–3	Internacional	São Paulo
	Aílton Lira 42'		Bira 1', 11', 56'	Stadium: Estádio Cícero Pompeu de Toledo (Morumbi); Attendance: 14,353; Referee: Ulisses Tavares

February 28 National	Catanduvense	1–0	São Paulo	Catanduva
				Stadium: Rua Amazonas

Mar 4 International	São Paulo (Brazil)	4–2	(Sweden) Malmö FF	São Paulo
	Aílton Lira 15'; Serginho 34'; Renato 65'; Edu 73'		Andersson 27'; Aslund 55'	Stadium: Estádio Cícero Pompeu de Toledo (Morumbi); Referee: José Guidotti

Aug 5 National	Palmeiras	0–4	São Paulo	São Paulo
			Assis 14'; Getúlio 20'; Zé Sérgio 77', 84'	Stadium: Estádio Cícero Pompeu de Toledo (Morumbi); Attendance: 12,510; Referee: Oscar Scolfaro

Aug 26 International	São Paulo (Brazil)	2–2	Saudi Arabia	São Paulo
	Serginho; Assis		Goal	Stadium: Estádio Cícero Pompeu de Toledo (Morumbi)

Nov 28 International	São Paulo (Brazil)	1–0	Soviet Union	São Paulo
	Paulo César 56'			Stadium: Estádio Cícero Pompeu de Toledo (Morumbi); Attendance: 36,430; Referee: Dulcidio Wanderley Boschilla

== Official competitions ==
=== Campeonato Brasileiro ===
Feb 24 First phase 1	Grêmio	0–0	São Paulo	Porto Alegre
				Stadium: Estádio Olímpico Monumental; Referee: Arnaldo César Coelho

Feb 27 First phase 2	São Paulo	1–2	Vasco da Gama	São Paulo
	Serginho 37'		Orlando 50'; Aílton 62'	Stadium: Estádio Cícero Pompeu de Toledo (Morumbi); Attendance: 18,023; Referee: Bráulio Zanotto

Mar 1 First phase 3	São Paulo	2–0	Maranhão	São Paulo
	Renato 15'; Teodoro 51'			Stadium: Estádio Cícero Pompeu de Toledo (Morumbi); Attendance: 13,183; Referee: Afonso Vítor Oliveira

Mar 8 First phase 4	São Paulo	5–3	Coritiba	São Paulo
	Teodoro 17'; Serginho 38'; Getúlio 63'; Renato 75'; Zé Sérgio 85'		Duílio 16', 18'; Eduardo 82'	Stadium: Estádio Cícero Pompeu de Toledo (Morumbi); Attendance: 16,830; Referee: José Roberto Wright

Mar 16 First phase 5	Nacional-AM	2–2	São Paulo	Manaus
	Létieri 1'; Nílton 87'		Aílton Lira 17'; Serginho 30'	Stadium: Estádio Vivaldo Lima (Vivaldão); Attendance: 9,047; Referee: José de Castro Serpa

Mar 19 First phase 6	São Paulo	2–0	America	São Paulo
	Renato 9'; Zé Sérgio 56'			Stadium: Estádio Cícero Pompeu de Toledo (Morumbi); Attendance: 9,958; Referee: Carlos Rosa Martins

Mar 23 First phase 7	Gama	2–2	São Paulo	Gama
	Fantato 54'; Robertinho 62'		Serginho 7'; Aílton Lira 77'	Stadium: Estádio Walmir Campelo Bezerra (Bezerrão); Referee: Carlos Costa

Mar 26 First phase 8	Atlético Goianiense	0–0	São Paulo	Goiânia
				Stadium: Estádio do Governo do Estado de Goiás (Serra Dourada); Attendance: 14,864; Referee: Valquir Pimentel

Mar 30 First phase 9	São Paulo	3–1	Santa Cruz	São Paulo
	Aílton Lira 42'; Serginho 55', 63'		Valderez 85'	Stadium: Estádio Cícero Pompeu de Toledo (Morumbi); Attendance: 23,221; Referee: Moacir dos Santos

Apr 6 Second phase 1	Botafogo	3–3	São Paulo	Rio de Janeiro
	Renato Sá 13'; Wecsley 25'; Mendonça 68'		Renato 32'; Serginho 70'; Assis 86'	Stadium: Estádio Jornalista Mário Filho (Maracanã); Attendance: 39,588; Referee: Aírton Bernardoni

Apr 13 Second phase 2	Americano	0–0	São Paulo	Campos dos Goytacazes
				Stadium: Estádio Godofredo Cruz; Referee: Samuel Mendes

Apr 17 Second phase 3	São Paulo	2–1	Ceará	São Paulo
	Assis 3'; Serginho 67'		Ivanir 74'	Stadium: Estádio Cícero Pompeu de Toledo (Morumbi); Attendance: 11,630; Referee: José Luís Barreto

Apr 20 Second phase 4	São Paulo	3–0	Botafogo	São Paulo
	Serginho 22', 55'; Getúlio 63'			Stadium: Estádio Cícero Pompeu de Toledo (Morumbi); Attendance: 37,701; Referee: Manuel Serapião Filho

Apr 27 Second phase 5	Ceará	3–3	São Paulo	Fortaleza
	Jorge Nei 1'; Edmar 9'; Roberto Bacuri 77'		Aílton Lira 6'; Getúlio 16'; Zé Sérgio 45'	Stadium: Estádio Presidente Vargas; Attendance: 8,762; Referee: Saul Mendes

May 4 Second phase 6	São Paulo	4–1	Americano	São Paulo
	Serginho 18', 65'; Renato 62'; Zizinho 73'		Té 80'	Stadium: Estádio Cícero Pompeu de Toledo (Morumbi); Attendance: 15,239; Referee: Eraldo Palmerini

May 11 Third phase 1	São Paulo	0–0	Atlético Mineiro	São Paulo
				Stadium: Estádio Cícero Pompeu de Toledo (Morumbi); Attendance: 63,891; Referee: Wilson dos Santos

May 15 Third phase 2	Vasco da Gama	2–1	São Paulo	Rio de Janeiro
	Dudu 60'; Wilsinho 66'		Leo 82' (o.g.)	Stadium: Estádio Jornalista Mário Filho (Maracanã); Attendance: 34,334; Referee: Gilson Cordeiro

May 18 Third phase 3	São Paulo	3–2	Fluminense	São Paulo
	Zé Sérgio 36'; Getúlio 75', 83'		Edinho 42', 78'	Stadium: Estádio Cícero Pompeu de Toledo (Morumbi); Attendance: 3,960; Referee: Bráulio Zanotto

==== Record ====
Final Position	Points	Matches	Wins	Draws	Losses	Goals For	Goals Away	Win%
9th	24	18	8	8	2	36	22	75%

=== Campeonato Paulista ===
May 22 First stage 1	América	1–1	São Paulo	São José do Rio Preto
	Petróleo 15'		Nei 85'	Stadium: Estádio Mário Alves de Mendonça; Attendance: 10,720; Referee: Romualdo Arppi Filho

May 25 First stage 2	São Paulo	2–0	Ferroviária	São Paulo
	Getúlio 33'; Zé Sérgio 86'			Stadium: Estádio Cícero Pompeu de Toledo (Morumbi); Attendance: 4,920; Referee: Almir Peixoto

May 29 First stage 3	Portuguesa	1–1	São Paulo	São Paulo
	Caio 51'		Aílton Lira 56'	Stadium: Estádio Municipal Paulo Machado de Carvalho (Pacaembu); Attendance: 15,591; Referee: Romualdo Arppi Filho

Jun 1 First stage 4	Noroeste	1–3	São Paulo	Bauru
	Osmir 7'		Aílton Lira 45', 90'; Zé Sérgio 63'	Stadium: Estádio Doutor Alfredo de Castilho; Attendance: 6,440; Referee: José Pereira da Silva

Jun 5 First stage 5	XV de Jaú	0–0	São Paulo	Jaú
				Stadium: Estádio Municipal José Magalhães de Almeida; Attendance: 11,009; Referee: José Guidotti

Jun 8 First stage 6	São Paulo	2–0	Marília	São Paulo
	Zizinho 69'; Assis 90'			Stadium: Estádio Cícero Pompeu de Toledo (Morumbi); Attendance: 3,630; Referee: Emídio Marques de Mesquita

Jun 11 First stage 7	São Paulo	1–2	São Bento	São Paulo
	Assis 17'		Gatãozinho 16'; Ticão 42'	Stadium: Estádio Cícero Pompeu de Toledo (Morumbi); Attendance: 2,307; Referee: Dulcídio Wanderley Boschilia

Jun 14 First stage 8	São Paulo	1–0	XV de Piracicaba	São Paulo
	Assis 71'			Stadium: Estádio Cícero Pompeu de Toledo (Morumbi); Attendance: 2,423; Referee: José de Assis Aragão

Jun 18 First stage 9	Taubaté	1–0	São Paulo	Taubaté
	Amauri 40'			Stadium: Estádio Joaquim de Morais Filho; Referee: José Pereira da Silva

Jun 22 First stage 10	Botafogo	2–1	São Paulo	Ribeirão Preto
	Silvinho 34'; Osmarzinho 41'		Tatu 85'	Stadium: Estádio Santa Cruz; Attendance: 6,710; Referee: Roberto Nunes Morgado

Jun 26 First stage 11	Juventus	2–0	São Paulo	São Paulo
	Ataliba 4'; Cuca 11'			Stadium: Estádio Municipal Paulo Machado de Carvalho (Pacaembu); Attendance: 1,075; Referee: José de Assis Aragão

Jun 29 First stage 12	São Paulo	1–1	Francana	São Paulo
	Marião 54'		Póli 91'	Stadium: Estádio Municipal Paulo Machado de Carvalho (Pacaembu); Attendance: 2,675; Referee: José Guidotti

Jul 2 First stage 13	São Paulo	0–1	Comercial	São Paulo
			Neca 70'	Stadium: Estádio Municipal Paulo Machado de Carvalho (Pacaembu); Attendance: 3,427; Referee: Márcio Sales

Jul 5 First stage 14	São Paulo	1–0	Palmeiras	São Paulo
	Getúlio 45'			Stadium: Estádio Cícero Pompeu de Toledo (Morumbi); Attendance: 16,630; Referee: Romualdo Arppi Filho

Jul 9 First stage 15	Internacional	1–2	São Paulo	Limeira
	Élvio 65'		Getúlio 22'; Pereyra 79'	Stadium: Estádio Municipal Major José Levy Sobrinho; Attendance: 13,740; Referee: Dulcídio Wanderley Boschilia

Jul 13 First stage 16	Corinthians	0–1	São Paulo	São Paulo
			Serginho 75'	Stadium: Estádio Cícero Pompeu de Toledo (Morumbi); Attendance: 51,432; Referee: Roberto Nunes Morgado

Jul 16 First stage 17	São Paulo	0–1	Ponte Preta	São Paulo
			Osvaldo 89'	Stadium: Estádio Cícero Pompeu de Toledo (Morumbi); Attendance: 10,113; Referee: João Leopoldo Aieta

Jul 19 First stage 18	São Paulo	2–2	Santos	São Paulo
	Serginho 62'; Assis 83'		João Paulo 44'; Campos 48'	Stadium: Estádio Cícero Pompeu de Toledo (Morumbi); Attendance: 38,324; Referee: Oscar Scolfaro

Jul 23 First stage 19	Guarani	2–2	São Paulo	Campinas
	Careca 77'; Osnir 85'		Chiquinho 6' (o.g.); Assis 27'	Stadium: Estádio Brinco de Ouro da Princesa; Attendance: 3,446; Referee: Márcio Sales

Aug 10 Second stage 1	São Paulo	4–0	Corinthians	São Paulo
	Serginho 15', 59'; Renato 47'; Paulo César 87'			Stadium: Estádio Cícero Pompeu de Toledo (Morumbi); Attendance: 41,133; Referee: Romualdo Arppi Filho

Aug 13 Second stage 2	São Paulo	3–1	XV de Jaú	São Paulo
	Serginho 59'; Getúlio 78', 83'		Célio 45'	Stadium: Estádio Cícero Pompeu de Toledo (Morumbi); Attendance: 14,129; Referee: Márcio Sales

Aug 17 Second stage 3	Comercial	0–1	São Paulo	Ribeirão Preto
			Assis 22'	Stadium: Estádio Doutor Francisco de Palma Travassos; Attendance: 16,216; Referee: Roberto Nunes Morgado

Aug 20 Second stage 4	São Paulo	2–0	Taubaté	São Paulo
	Renato 62'; Serginho 65'			Stadium: Estádio Cícero Pompeu de Toledo (Morumbi); Attendance: 15,239; Referee: Romualdo Arppi Filho

Aug 23 Second stage 5	São Paulo	1–0	Noroeste	São Paulo
	Zé Sérgio 37'			Stadium: Estádio Cícero Pompeu de Toledo (Morumbi); Attendance: 22,633; Referee: João Leopoldo Aieta

Aug 31 Second stage 6	São Paulo	1–0	Portuguesa	São Paulo
	Serginho 78'			Stadium: Estádio Cícero Pompeu de Toledo (Morumbi); Attendance: 39,139; Referee: Dulcídio Wanderley Boschilia

Sep 7 Second stage 7	São Bento	1–1	São Paulo	Sorocaba
	Cremílson 82'		Serginho 77'	Stadium: Estádio Municipal Wálter Ribeiro; Attendance: 22,080; Referee: Romualdo Arppi Filho

Sep 11 Second stage 8	São Paulo	2–0	Botafogo	São Paulo
	Renato 18'; Zé Sérgio 72'			Stadium: Estádio Cícero Pompeu de Toledo (Morumbi); Attendance: 11,178; Referee: Roberto Nunes Morgado

Sep 14 Second stage 9	Marília	0–0	São Paulo	Marília
				Stadium: Estádio Municipal Bento de Abreu Sampaio Vidal; Attendance: 12,413; Referee: Dulcídio Wanderley Boschilia

Sep 21 Second stage 10	Ferroviária	0–1	São Paulo	Araraquara
			Zé Sérgio 51'	Stadium: Estádio Doutor Adhemar de Barros (Fonte Luminosa); Attendance: 12,261; Referee: Roberto Nunes Morgado

Sep 28 Second stage 11	Francana	1–1	São Paulo	Franca
	Parraga 78'		Paulo César 5'	Stadium: Estádio Municipal Doutor José Lancha Filho; Attendance: 13,538; Referee: José de Assis Aragão

Oct 2 Second stage 12	São Paulo	1–0	Juventus	São Paulo
	Getúlio 50'			Stadium: Estádio Cícero Pompeu de Toledo (Morumbi); Attendance: 13,084; Referee: Márcio Sales

Oct 5 Second stage 13	XV de Piracicaba	1–1	São Paulo	Piracicaba
	China 20'		Paulo César 27'	Stadium: Estádio Municipal Barão de Serra Negra; Attendance: 17,173; Referee: Roberto Nunes Morgado

Oct 8 Second stage 14	São Paulo	1–3	Guarani	São Paulo
	Zizinho 87'		Jorge Mendonça 29'; Almir 62' (o.g.); Capitão 72'	Stadium: Estádio Cícero Pompeu de Toledo (Morumbi); Attendance: 5,950; Referee: Roberto Nunes Morgado

Oct 12 Second stage 15	Palmeiras	0–3	São Paulo	São Paulo
			Assis 3'; Serginho 48'; Heriberto 61'	Stadium: Estádio Cícero Pompeu de Toledo (Morumbi); Attendance: 25,250; Referee: Oscar Scolfaro

Oct 16 Second stage 16	São Paulo	1–0	América	São Paulo
	Zé Sérgio 37'			Stadium: Estádio Cícero Pompeu de Toledo (Morumbi); Attendance: 12,727; Referee: João Leopoldo Aieta

Oct 19 Second stage 17	Santos	1–1	São Paulo	São Paulo
	Pita 24'		Getúlio 6'	Stadium: Estádio Cícero Pompeu de Toledo (Morumbi); Attendance: 49,649; Referee: Roberto Nunes Morgado

Oct 22 Second stage 18	Ponte Preta	0–0	São Paulo	Campinas
				Stadium: Estádio Moisés Lucarelli; Attendance: 21,602; Referee: José de Assis Aragão

Oct 25 Second stage 19	São Paulo	1–1	Internacional	São Paulo
	Serginho 18'		Simões 12'	Stadium: Estádio Cícero Pompeu de Toledo (Morumbi); Attendance: 17,173; Referee: Roberto Nunes Morgado

Nov 2 Second stage - Semi	São Paulo	1–2	Internacional	São Paulo
	Paulo César 36'		Oscar 26' (o.g.); Toinzinho 53'	Stadium: Estádio Cícero Pompeu de Toledo (Morumbi); Attendance: 62,304; Referee: Romualdo Arppi Filho

Nov 5 Second stage - Semi	Internacional	1–3	São Paulo	São Paulo
	Marco 36'		Zé Sérgio 18'; Renato 36'; Paulo César 94'	Stadium: Estádio Cícero Pompeu de Toledo (Morumbi); Attendance: 52,267; Referee: José de Assis Aragão

Nov 9 Second stage - Final	São Paulo	2–1	Ponte Preta	São Paulo
	Renato 48'; Serginho 65'		Barrinha 27'	Stadium: Estádio Cícero Pompeu de Toledo (Morumbi); Attendance: 84,553; Referee: Márcio Sales

Nov 12 Second stage - Final	São Paulo	0–1	Ponte Preta	São Paulo
			Paulinho 18'	Stadium: Estádio Cícero Pompeu de Toledo (Morumbi); Attendance: 50,614; Referee: Roberto Nunes Morgado

Nov 16 Final	São Paulo	1–0	Santos	São Paulo
	Serginho 85'			Stadium: Estádio Cícero Pompeu de Toledo (Morumbi); Attendance: 122,209; Referee: José de Assis Aragão

Nov 19 Final	Santos	0–1	São Paulo	São Paulo
			Serginho 40'	Stadium: Estádio Cícero Pompeu de Toledo (Morumbi); Attendance: 61,130; Referee: Oscar Scolfaro

==== Record ====
Final Position	Points	Matches	Wins	Draws	Losses	Goals For	Goals Away	Win%
1st	57	44	22	13	9	55	32	65%
