= Ailton =

Ailton is a given name. Notable people with the name include:

== Arts and entertainment ==
- Ailton Krenak (born 1954), Brazilian writer and journalist
- Ailton Graça (born 1964), Brazilian actor

== Religion ==
- Ailton Menegussi (born 1962), Brazilian bishop

== Sportspeople ==
- Aílton Lira (born 1951), Brazilian football forward
- Ailton dos Santos Silva (born 1966), Brazilian football manager
- Aílton Ferraz (born 1966), Brazilian football forward and manager
- Aílton (footballer, born 1956), born José Ailton de Oliveira Silva, Brazilian football centre-back
- Aílton (footballer, born 1968), born Aílton Delfino, Brazilian football striker
- Aílton (footballer, born 1973), born Aílton Gonçalves da Silva, Brazilian football striker
- Aílton (footballer, born 1977), born José Aílton da Silva, Brazilian midfielder
- Aílton (footballer, born 1980), born Aílton de Oliveira Modesto, Brazilian football midfielder
- Aílton (footballer, born August 1984), born Aílton José Almeida, Brazilian football forward
- Aílton (footballer, born October 1984), born Aílton do Nascimento Correia, Brazilian football midfielder
- Ailton (footballer, born 1994), born Ailton Machado de Souza Rosa, Brazilian football midfielder
- Ailton (footballer, born 1995), born Ailton Ferreira Silva, Brazilian football left-back
- Aílton Júnior (born 1987), born Jose Junior Pereira Ailton, Brazilian football defender
- Ailton Canela (1994–2016), Brazilian football forward who died in the Chapecoeanse plane crash
- Ailton (Cape Verdean footballer) (born 1996), born Ailton César Duarte Silva, Cape Verdean football forward
- Aylton Lataria (1942–2008), born Francisco Aylton Dias, Brazilian football forward
