= Sylvio =

Sylvio may refer to:

- Sylvio Breleur (born 1978), French Guiana football player
- Sylvio de Lellis (born 1923), the second son of the Baron Admiral Armando de Lellis
- Sylvio de Paula Ferreira (1934–2017), Brazilian football player
- Sylvio Hoffmann Mazzi (born 1908), former Brazilian football player
- Sylvio Lazzari (1857–1944), French composer of Austrian origin
- Sylvio Mantha (1902–1974), Canadian professional ice hockey player
- Sylvio Pirillo (or Silvio Pirilo) (1916–1991), Brazilian football striker
- Sylvio Tabet (born in Beirut, Lebanon) is a Lebanese filmmaker and Producer

== See also ==
- Stade Sylvio Cator, multi-purpose stadium in Port-au-Prince, Haiti
