= Virgilio =

Virgilio, the Italian and Spanish form of Virgil may refer to:

- Virgilio, Lombardy, a frazione of the comune of Borgo Virgilio in the Italian province of Mantua
- Virgilio.it, a website

== People with the given name ==
- Virgilio Barco Vargas (1921–1997), Colombian politician and civil engineer, 27th president of Colombia
- Pablo Virgilio David (born 1959), Filipino cardinal, current Bishop of Kalookan
- Virgilio Fiorenzi (1560–1644), Italian Roman Catholic bishop
- Virgilio Fossati (1889–1918), Italian footballer
- Virgilio Garcillano (1937–2025), Filipino politician
- Virgilio Gonzalez, Cuban exile and Watergate burglar
- Virgilio "Jhong" Hilario (born 1976), Filipino actor, dancer, and politician
- Virgílio Mendes (1926–2009), Portuguese footballer
- Virgilio Noè (1922–2011), Italian Cardinalate
- Virgilio Piñera (1912–1979), Cuban writer and poet
- Virgílio (footballer, born 1943), Virgílio Salgado de Camargo, Brazilian footballer

== Music ==
- Virgilio (album), sophomore studio album by Los Angeles based musical artist Bunii

== Surname ==
- Maria Andrea Virgilio (born 1996), Italian Paralympic archer
- Nicholas Anthony Virgilio, 1928–1989, Haiku poet in Camden, New Jersey
