= 1983 Campeonato Brasileiro Série B =

Campeonato Brasileiro Série B
- Season: 1983
- Champions: Juventus (1st title)
- Promoted: Juventus; CSA
- Top goalscorer: Lima (Operário-MS) - 6 goals
- Biggest home win: Operário-MS 6-0 América-MG (January 30, 1983)
- Biggest away win: Maranhão 1-5 Guarani (March 5, 1983)
- Highest scoring: Guarany de Sobral 6-3 Uberaba (February 27, 1983)
- Longest unbeaten run: Botafogo-SP; CSA; Guarani (7 matches)

The 1983 Campeonato Brasileiro Série B, officially, the Taça de Prata 1983, was the 6th edition of the Campeonato Brasileiro Série B.

== Rules ==
The championship had the same format than in 1982, being performed by 48 teams.in the first phase, 36 teams, divided into 6 groups of 6 teams each, in which the two best teams of each group proceeded to the second phase, in which the twelve teams were divided into four groups of three teams.the first placed team of each group were promoted to the Second phase of the Taça de Ouro of the same year. the second placed teams of each group would proceed to the Third phase, in which they would be joined by the twelve clubs that hadn't qualified to the Second phase in the Taça de Ouro.the Third phase was disputed in a knockout tournament format, and the winners qualified to the Quarterfinals, with the knockout tournament continuing until two teams reached the finals.those were promoted to the Copa Brasil of the following year. However, the rules for the 1984 championship were eventually changed, with Juventus and CSA losing their berths in the 1984 Copa Brasil in favour of Vasco da Gama and Grêmio, that, due to their records in the 1983 state championships, wouldn't have qualified for the 1984 Campeonato Brasileiro normally.

== First phase ==
=== Group A ===
Pos	Team	Pld	W	D	L	GF	GA	GD	Pts
1	Maranhão	5	3	2	0	7	3	+4	8
2	(Ceará) Guarany de Sobral	5	3	1	1	9	5	+4	7
3	(Amazonas (Brazilian state)) Nacional	5	2	1	2	5	7	−2	5
4	(Piauí) River	5	1	3	1	7	7	0	5
5	Ceará	5	0	3	2	2	5	−3	3
6	(Pará) Remo	5	0	2	3	2	5	−3	2

=== Group B ===
Pos	Team	Pld	W	D	L	GF	GA	GD	Pts
1	(Pernambuco) Santa Cruz	5	4	1	0	10	0	+10	9
2	(Pernambuco) Central	5	3	0	2	9	3	+6	6
3	(Paraíba) Campinense	5	2	2	1	6	5	+1	6
4	(Sergipe) Itabaiana	5	1	2	2	2	6	−4	4
5	(Rio Grande do Norte) Alecrim	5	1	2	2	5	11	−6	4
6	(Alagoas) CRB	5	0	1	4	0	7	−7	1

=== Group C ===
Pos	Team	Pld	W	D	L	GF	GA	GD	Pts
1	(Rio de Janeiro (state)) Bangu	5	3	2	0	11	1	+10	8
2	(Rio de Janeiro (state)) Americano	5	3	0	2	7	5	+2	6
3	(Federal District (Brazil)) Guará	5	2	1	2	4	5	−1	5
4	(Bahia) Vitória	5	2	0	3	6	9	−3	4
5	(Espírito Santo) Guarapari	5	2	0	3	6	11	−5	4
6	(Bahia) Fluminense de Feira	5	1	1	3	4	7	−3	3

=== Group D ===
Pos	Team	Pld	W	D	L	GF	GA	GD	Pts
1	(São Paulo (state)) Botafogo-SP	5	3	2	0	10	5	+5	8
2	(Goiás) Itumbiara	5	3	1	1	8	6	+2	7
3	(Goiás) Atlético-GO	5	2	1	2	9	8	+1	5
4	(Paraná (state)) Coritiba	4	1	2	1	5	7	−2	4
5	(Paraná (state)) Grêmio Maringá	5	1	1	3	7	9	−2	3
6	(Mato Grosso) Operário-MT	4	0	1	3	2	6	−4	1

=== Group E ===
Pos	Team	Pld	W	D	L	GF	GA	GD	Pts
1	(São Paulo (state)) Guarani	5	3	2	0	11	5	+6	8
2	(Minas Gerais) Uberaba	5	3	1	1	8	4	+4	8 (Note: 1 bonus point?)
3	(Mato Grosso do Sul) Operário-MS	5	2	2	1	12	5	+7	6
4	(Rio de Janeiro (state)) Bonsucesso	5	1	1	3	8	12	−4	3
5	(Rio de Janeiro (state)) Volta Redonda	5	1	1	3	7	11	−4	3
6	(Minas Gerais) América-MG	5	1	1	3	3	12	−9	3

=== Group F ===
Pos	Team	Pld	W	D	L	GF	GA	GD	Pts
1	(São Paulo (state)) Portuguesa	5	3	2	0	6	1	+5	8
2	(Paraná (state)) Londrina	5	2	3	0	6	1	+5	7
3	(Rio Grande do Sul) Esportivo	5	2	2	1	5	3	+2	6
4	(São Paulo (state)) São Bento	5	1	2	2	5	7	−2	4
5	(Rio Grande do Sul) Novo Hamburgo	5	0	4	1	5	8	−3	4
6	(Santa Catarina (state)) Criciúma	5	0	1	4	2	9	−7	1

== Second phase ==
=== Group G ===
Pos	Team	Pld	W	D	L	GF	GA	GD	Pts	Promotion or qualification
1	Guarani	2	1	1	0	5	1	+4	3	Promoted to Second phase of Taça de Ouro
2	Central	2	1	1	0	3	0	+3	3	Qualified to Third phase
3	Maranhão	2	0	0	2	1	8	−7	0	

=== Group H ===
Pos	Team	Pld	W	D	L	GF	GA	GD	Pts	Promotion or qualification
1	Uberaba	2	1	0	1	8	6	+2	2	Promoted to Second phase of Taça de Ouro
2	Guarany de Sobral	2	1	0	1	7	6	+1	2	Qualified to Third phase
3	Santa Cruz	2	1	0	1	3	6	−3	2	

=== Group I ===
Pos	Team	Pld	W	D	L	GF	GA	GD	Pts	Promotion or qualification
1	Americano	2	1	1	0	3	1	+2	3	Promoted to Second phase of Taça de Ouro
2	Itumbiara	2	1	0	1	3	4	−1	2	Qualified to Third phase
3	Portuguesa	2	0	1	1	3	4	−1	1	

=== Group J ===
Pos	Team	Pld	W	D	L	GF	GA	GD	Pts	Promotion or qualification
1	Botafogo-SP	2	1	1	0	4	1	+3	3	Promoted to Second phase of Taça de Ouro
2	Londrina	2	1	0	1	1	3	−2	2	Qualified to Semifinals
3	Bangu	2	0	1	1	1	2	−1	1	

== Third phase ==
Team 1	Agg.	Team 2	1st leg	2nd leg
Juventus	4-2	Itumbiara	3-1	1-1
Galícia	5-3	Fortaleza	5-2	0-1
Ferroviário	2-3	Londrina	1-0	1-3
Moto Clube	2-7	Joinville	0-3	0-4
Rio Branco-ES	2-3	Mixto	1-1	1-2
CSA	4-1	Guarany de Sobral	4-1	0-0
Paysandu	3-4	Central	2-2	1-2
Treze	3-5	Brasília	3-2	0-3

== Quarterfinals ==
Team 1	Agg.	Team 2	1st leg	2nd leg
Galícia	3-5	Juventus	2-3	1-2
Londrina	0-2	Joinville	0-3	0-1
Mixto	2-7	CSA	1-3	1-4
Brasília	2-1	Central	1-0	1-1

== Semifinals ==
Team 1	Agg.	Team 2	1st leg	2nd leg
Joinville	1-2	Juventus	0-0	1-2
Brasília	1-1	CSA	0-0	1-1

== Finals ==
=== First leg ===
24 April 1983

CSA (Alagoas)	3 – 1	(São Paulo (state)) Juventus
Romel 41', Zé Carlos 63'; Josenílton 76'		Ilo 86'

Rei Pelé, Maceió (AL)
Attendance: 14,765
Referee: (Rio Grande do Sul) Carlos Sérgio Rosa Martins

=== Second leg ===
1 May 1982

Juventus (São Paulo (state))	3 – 0	(Alagoas) CSA
Gatãozinho 7'; Bira 78'; Trajano 82'

Parque São Jorge, São Paulo (SP)
Attendance: 2,467
Referee: (Rio de Janeiro (state)) Arnaldo Cezar Coelho

=== Replay ===
4 May 1982

Juventus (São Paulo (state))	1 – 0	(Alagoas) CSA
Paulo Martins 71' (pen.)

Parque São Jorge, São Paulo (SP)
Attendance: 3,205
Referee: (Rio Grande do Sul) Luís Carlos Félix

== Sources ==
- RSSSF
