= Torneio dos Cinco Clubes =

1934 Torneio dos Cinco Clubes
1934 Campeonato Paulista Extra

Tournament details
- Country: São Paulo, Brazil
- Dates: 23 September – 23 December
- Teams: 5

Final positions
- Champions: São Paulo
- Runners-up: Corinthians

Tournament statistics
- Matches played: 16
- Goals scored: 44 (2.75 per match)
- Top goal scorer(s): Friedenreich, Hércules (São Paulo); Mendes (Santos); 3 goals each

The Torneio dos Cinco Clubes, also called Torneio Extra Paulista, was a qualifying tournament for the 1934 Torneio Rio-São Paulo, organized by APEA.

The tournament was interrupted before the end due to the departure of Palestra Italia and Corinthians from APEA, and the creation of the LPF. In Rio de Janeiro, a similar process occurred with the change of league of the main clubs (from the LCF to the FMD), which led to the non-realization of the Torneio-Rio São Paulo in 1934.

As there were only two matches left for the end of the competition, São Paulo declared itself champion.

== Matches ==
Following is the list of matches played before the interruption of the championship.

23 September

São Paulo	1–2	Corinthians
Junqueirinha 55'	Report	Mamede 14'; Lopes 38'

Chácara da Floresta, São Paulo
Referee: Antônio Sotero de Mendonça
30 September

Corinthians	2–0	Palestra Itália
Zuza	Report

Parque São Jorge, São Paulo
Referee: Affonso Mesquita
7 October

Portuguesa	2–4	São Paulo
Paschoalino 9'; Alberto 52'		Aparizio Vega 18'; Hércules 32', 46'; Friedenreich 78'

Rua Cesário Ramalho, São Paulo
Referee: Manoel Nunes
7 October

Santos	1–1	Palestra Itália
Goal	Report	Vicente

Vila Belmiro, Santos
Referee: José Alexandrino
14 October

Santos	1–2	São Paulo
Mendes 5'		Orozimbo 44'; Hércules 87'

Vila Belmiro, Santos
Referee: Manoel Nunes
21 October

Corinthians	1–0	Santos
Tedesco	Report

Parque São Jorge, São Paulo
Referee: Atílio Grimaldi
22 October

Palestra Itália	2–2	Portuguesa
Romeu 56'; Vicente 63'		Alberto 18'; Teixeirinha 46'

Parque São Jorge, São Paulo
Referee: José Alexandrino
28 October

Palestra Itália	0–1	São Paulo
		Zarzur 17'

Parque Antártica, São Paulo
Referee: Edgar da Silva Marques
28 October

Corinthians	1–0	Portuguesa
Lopes 20'

Parque Antártica, São Paulo
Referee: Atílio Grimaldi
22 November

Portuguesa	1–2	Santos
Goal		Goal

25 November

Portuguesa	0–1	Corinthians
		Munhoz 60'

Parque Antártica, São Paulo
Referee: Atílio Grimaldi
25 November

São Paulo	4–2	Santos
Luisinho 5'; Araken 34'; Friedenreich 48', 71'		Moran 57'; Mendes 78'

Chácara da Floresta, São Paulo
Referee: José Alexandrino
2 December

Corinthians	0–1	São Paulo
		Orozimbo 75'

Parque São Jorge, São Paulo
Referee: José Alexandrino
2 December

Palestra Itália	3–2	Santos
Avelino; Sandro; Imparato	Report	Goal

Parque São Jorge, São Paulo
Referee: Joaquim de Almeida
23 December

Santos	2–4	Portuguesa
Mendes 12' (pen.); Logu 66'		Arnaldo 10'; Sacy 25'; Machado 30' (pen.); Alberto 65'

Vila Belmiro, Santos
Referee: Joaquim de Almeida

== Final standings ==
Source:RSSSF

Team	Pts	P	W	D	L	GF	GA	GD
São Paulo	10	6	5	0	1	12	7	+5
Corinthians	10	7	5	0	2	7	2	+5
Portuguesa	5	8	2	1	5	9	12	-3
Santos	5	7	2	1	4	10	16	-5
Palestra Itália	4	6	1	2	3	6	8	-2

== Champion ==
1934 Torneio dos Cinco Clubes
(São Paulo (state))
São Paulo
1st title
