= Deleu =

Deleu may refer to:

== Footballers ==
- Deleu (footballer, born 1940), Wanderlei dos Santos, Brazilian right back
- Deleu (footballer, born 1984), Luiz Carlos Santos, Brazilian defender
