= Gatão =

Brazilian footballer

Personal information
- Full name: Vicente Naval Filho
- Date of birth: 10 May 1928
- Place of birth: Piracicaba, Brazil
- Date of death: 2 March 1995 (aged 66)
- Place of death: Piracicaba, Brazil
- Position: Forward

Youth career
- EC Vera Cruz (Piracicaba)

Senior career*
Years	Team	Apps	(Gls)
1945–1952	XV de Piracicaba	423	(212)
1952–1955	Corinthians	73	(18)
1955	Ponte Preta		
- * Club domestic league appearances and goals as of 16 January 2024

Vicente Naval Filho (10 May 1928 – 2 March 1995), better known by the nickname Gatão, was a Brazilian professional footballer who played as a forward.

== Career ==
A standout in amateur football in Piracicaba, Vicente received the nickname Gatão due to his father's warehouse, which was close to the old stadium on Rua Moraes Barros. He played most of his career for XV, where he participated in the conquests of the second division in 1947 and 1948, in addition to Corinthians, being part of the state champion squad and the Rio-São Paulo Tournament in the early 50s. Having problems maintaining his physical shape, he ended his career after a quick spell at Ponte Preta.

== Personal life ==
Vicente is father of the also footballer José Fernando Naval, better known as Gatãozinho.

== Honours ==
XV de Piracicaba

- Campeonato Paulista Série A2: 1947, 1948
- Torneio Início Paulista: 1949

Corinthians

- Campeonato Paulista: 1952, 1954
- Torneio Rio-São Paulo: 1953, 1954
- Taça Charles Miller: 1954
