= Toinho =

Brazilian footballer

Personal information
- Full name: Antônio Pádua Soares
- Date of birth: 13 June 1952 (age 74)
- Place of birth: Teresina, Brazil
- Position: Goalkeeper

Youth career
- 1969–1972: Tiradentes-PI

Senior career*
Years	Team	Apps	(Gls)
1972–1974	Tiradentes-PI		
1975–1976	Sport Recife		
1977–1982	São Paulo	131	(0)
1982–1984	Bangu		
1985–1988	Pinheiros-PR		
1989	Coritiba		
1990–1991	Atlético Paranaense		

Managerial career
- 2003: Paysandu (assistant)
- 2003: Grêmio (assistant)
- 2004: Portuguesa (assistant)
- * Club domestic league appearances and goals as of 23 September 2023

Antônio Pádua Soares (born 13 June 1952), better known as Toinho, is a Brazilian former professional footballer who played as a goalkeeper.

== Career ==
Toinho started playing amateur intermunicipal competitions in the interior of Piauí, until he was picked up by Tiradentes, where he was state champion in 1972 and 1974. He went to Sport Recife with the aim of being a reserve, but ended up winning the title and was again state champions. At São Paulo FC, he alternated with goalkeeper Waldir Peres, who was frequently called up for the Brazil national team. Toinho ended his career playing for Paraná state football clubs. From 2003 to 2004, he was Darío Pereyra technical assistant.

== Honours ==
Tiradentes

- Campeonato Piauiense: 1972, 1974

Sport Recife

- Campeonato Pernambucano: 1975

São Paulo

- Campeonato Brasileiro: 1977
- Campeonato Paulista: 1980, 1981

Pinheiros

- Campeonato Paranaense: 1987
