= Gijo =

Brazilian footballer

Personal information
- Full name: Romualdo Sperto
- Date of birth: August 1, 1919
- Place of birth: Ipaussu, Brazil
- Date of death: 5 November 1993 (aged 74)
- Place of death: São Paulo, Brazil
- Position: Goalkeeper

Youth career
- –1939: Palestra Itália

Senior career*
Years	Team	Apps	(Gls)
1939–1941	Palestra Itália	67	(0)
1942–1944	Fluminense	31	(0)
1944–1949	São Paulo	143	(0)
- * Club domestic league appearances and goals as of 23 September 2023

Romualdo Sperto (1 August 1919 – 5 November 1993), better known as Gijo, was a Brazilian professional footballer who played as a goalkeeper.

== Career ==
Born in the city of Ipaussu, Gijo began his career with Palestra Itália's youth team, where he made 67 appearances for the club. Then he had a quick spell at Fluminense, and went to São Paulo FC, a club that had the mission of replacing King. He is among the 10 goalkeepers who played most times for São Paulo FC.

== Honours ==
Palmeiras

- Campeonato Paulista: 1940

São Paulo

- Campeonato Paulista: 1945, 1946, 1948
- Taça dos Campeões Estaduais Rio-São Paulo: 1945, 1946
- Torneio Início: 1945
