= Abelha =

Brazilian footballer (born 1958)

Personal information
- Full name: João Batista Lopes Abelha
- Date of birth: 3 January 1958 (age 68)
- Place of birth: Araraquara, Brazil
- Height: 1.86 m (6 ft 1 in)
- Position: Goalkeeper

Youth career
- –1979: Vila Xavier (Araraquara)
- 1979–1981: Ferroviária

Senior career*
Years	Team	Apps	(Gls)
1981–1983	Ferroviária		
1983–1984	Flamengo	10	(0)
1984–1985	São Paulo	31	(0)
1986–1987	São Bento		
1988	Inter de Limeira		
1988–1989	Botafogo-SP		
1989	ABC		
1989–1991	Honda FC		
1992	São Bento		

International career
1983	Brazil U20		

Managerial career
- 1993: Kashima Antlers (goalkeepers coach)
- 1994: Japan (goalkeepers coach)
- 1995–1996: Kashima Antlers (goalkeepers coach)
- 1997: São Bento
- 1999: Colo-Colo (assistant)
- 2000: Amparo
- 2000–2001: Capivariano
- 2001: Independente
- 2001–2002: São Bento
- 2003: Barretos
- 2003: São Bento
- 2005: Figueirense (goalkeepers coach)
- 2006: São Bento
- 2006: Remo
- 2006–2007: Atlético Sorocaba
- 2007: São Bento
- 2007: XV de Piracicaba
- 2008–2009: Figueirense (youth)
- 2009–2010: São Bento
- 2011: Taubaté
- 2012: Capivariano
- 2013: Taubaté
- 2014: Capivariano
- * Club domestic league appearances and goals

João Batista Lopes Abelha (born 3 January 1958), simply known as Abelha, is a Brazilian former professional footballer and manager who played as a goalkeeper.

== Playing career ==
Abelha began his career at Ferroviária, a club in the city where he was born. In 1984 he transferred to Flamengo where he won the Guanabara Cup. He arrived at São Paulo to compete for a position with Barbirotto, but was unsuccessful, and then played for São Bento, Inter de Limeira, Botafogo de Ribeirão Preto, ABC, Honda Hamamatsu and São Bento, his last club in 1992.

== Managerial career ==
Living in Japan, he began his career as a goalkeeper coach in 1994, assisting Paulo Roberto Falcão on the Japan national football team. He managed São Bento for the first time in 1997, and in 1999 he was Nelsinho Baptista's assistant at Colo-Colo. He would still coach EC São Bento on several other occasions, with emphasis on his time in 2002 where he was champion of the Copa Paulista.

He was also a coach for the youth sectors at Figueirense, where he was directly responsible for the promotion of athletes Filipe Luís and Roberto Firmino to the professional ranks.

== Personal life ==
He took over his wife's sweets company in Sorocaba, after she died in 2012, abandoning his position as manager.

== Honours ==
=== Player ===
Brazil U20

- Toulon Tournament: 1983

Flamengo

- Taça Guanabara: 1984

São Paulo

- Campeonato Paulista: 1985

=== Manager ===
São Bento

- Copa FPF: 2002

Capivariano

- Campeonato Paulista Série A2: 2014
