= Paschoalin =

Brazilian footballer

Personal information
- Full name: Fernando Antônio Paschoalin
- Date of birth: 12 August 1948
- Place of birth: Bauru, Brazil
- Date of death: 25 April 2017 (aged 68)
- Place of death: Ribeirão Preto, Brazil
- Position: Goalkeeper

Youth career
- Comercial-SP

Senior career*
Years	Team	Apps	(Gls)
1968–1972	Comercial-SP		
1973–1976	São Paulo	29	(0)
1974	→ Botafogo-SP (loan)		
1977–1979	Santa Cruz		
- * Club domestic league appearances and goals as of 27 December 2023

Fernando Antônio Paschoalin (12 August 1948 – 25 April 2017), simply known as Paschoalin, was a Brazilian professional footballer who played as a goalkeeper.

== Career ==
Paschoalin began his career at Comercial de Ribeirão Preto, where he played from 1968 to 1972. He was hired by São Paulo and was a starter for the club during Telê Santana's first spell, but after the coach's departure he lost space and was loaned to Botafogo. He returned to the club and was state champion, as a substitute for Waldir Peres.

In 1972, Paschoalin conceded the last professional goal scored by Garrincha, in the 2–2 match Comercial vs. Olaria.

== Honours ==
São Paulo

- Campeonato Paulista: 1975

== Death ==
Paschoalin died in Ribeirão Preto, 25 April 2017, after 50 days in hospital due to problems with an unsuccessful bariatric surgery.
