= Gatãozinho =

Brazilian footballer

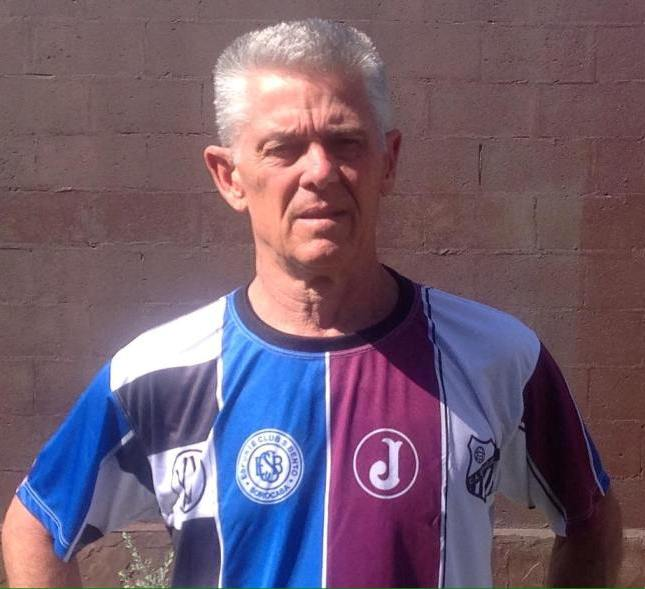
- Former footballer Gatãozinho in 2020

Personal information
- Full name: José Fernando Naval
- Date of birth: 11 April 1953 (age 73)
- Place of birth: Piracicaba, Brazil
- Height: 1.68 m (5 ft 6 in)
- Position: Midfielder

Youth career
- 1971–1973: Corinthians

Senior career*
Years	Team	Apps	(Gls)
1973–1974	XV de Piracicaba		
1975–1981	São Bento		
1981–1988	Juventus-SP	225	(20)
1988	Inter de Limeira		
1988–1989	Bragantino		
1990	São Bento		
- * Club domestic league appearances and goals as of 16 January 2024

José Fernando Naval (born 11 April 1953), better known by the nickname Gatãozinho, is a Brazilian former professional footballer who played as a midfielder.

== Career ==
Son of forward Gatão (Vicente Naval Filho), Gatãozinho started his career at Corinthians, standing out in the youth categories. As a professional, played for XV de Piracicaba, and made history with the shirt of EC São Bento, where he made more than 380 appearances, CA Juventus, where he won the 1983 Taça de Prata, and at CA Bragantino in the late 90s, being a of those largely responsible for structuring the club that would become state champion and runner-up in Brazilian Championship in the following years.

== Honours ==
Juventus

- Campeonato Brasileiro Série B: 1983
- Torneio Início Paulista: 1986

Bragantino

- Campeonato Paulista Série A2: 1988
- Campeonato Brasileiro Série B: 1989
