= João Sabino =

Brazilian footballer

Sabino
Personal information
- Full name: João Sabino
- Date of birth: October 2, 1938
- Place of birth: Bebedouro, Brazil
- Date of death: 5 September 1978 (aged 39)
- Place of death: Barretos, Brazil
- Position: Forward

Youth career
- Inter de Bebedouro

Senior career*
Years	Team	Apps	(Gls)
1961–1964	São Paulo	88	(22)
1965–1966	XV de Piracicaba		
1967	Uberlândia		
- * Club domestic league appearances and goals as of 26 September 2023

João Sabino (2 October 1938 – 5 September 1978), was a Brazilian professional footballer who played as a forward.

== Career ==
Revealed at Internacional de Bebedouro, he arrived at São Paulo FC along with another athlete on the team, the right back Deleu. At São Paulo, he made 88 appearances and scored 22 goals. Sabino had the nickname "Pelé de Bebedouro" due to his enormous physical resemblance with Pelé.

== Personal life ==
Sabino owned a butcher shop in the city of Bebedouro after retiring from football.

== Honours ==
São Paulo

- Small Club World Cup: 1963

== Death ==
He died of hepatitis, on 5 September 1978.
