= Nestor de Almeida =

Brazilian footballer

Nestor
Personal information
- Full name: Nestor de Almeida
- Date of birth: February 23, 1907
- Place of birth: Santos, Brazil
- Date of death: 3 August 1992 (aged 85)
- Place of death: São Paulo, Brazil
- Position: Goalkeeper

Youth career
- –1924: AA São Bento

Senior career*
Years	Team	Apps	(Gls)
1924	AA São Bento		
1925–1929	Paulistano		
1930–1931	São Paulo	35	(0)
- * Club domestic league appearances and goals as of 22 September 2023

Nestor de Almeida (23 February 1907 – 3 August 1992) was a Brazilian professional footballer who played as a goalkeeper.

== Career ==
Revealed at AA São Bento, he played for Paulistano until the club closed its football department in 1929. He went to São Paulo FC and became the first goalkeeper in the club's history. Nestor was seriously injured in a match against Palestra Itália on 1 May 1931, having to end his career early.

== Honours ==
Paulistano

- Campeonato Paulista (LAF): 1926, 1927, 1929

São Paulo

- Campeonato Paulista: 1931
