= Miruca =

Brazilian footballer

Personal information
- Full name: Waltemiro Fernandes Pessoa
- Date of birth: 22 June 1942 (age 84)
- Place of birth: João Pessoa, Brazil
- Position: Right winger

Senior career*
Years	Team	Apps	(Gls)
1962	Santos-PB		
1963	União-PB		
1964–1966	Treze		
1966–1968	Náutico		
1968–1970	São Paulo	75	(15)
1971	Noroeste		
1971–1972	Santa Cruz		
1973	Maguary-CE		
- * Club domestic league appearances and goals as of 12 October 2023

Waltemiro Fernandes Pessoa (born 22 June 1942), better known as Miruca, is a Brazilian former professional footballer who played as a right winger.

== Career ==
Miruca started his career at Santos de João Pessoa, and also played for União. He arrived at Treze in 1963 and became champion in 1966. He transferred to Náutico where he won 3 state championships and was runner-up in the Taça Brasil in 1967. Miruca arrived at São Paulo FC where, even without being an absolute titleholder, he was of great importance in winning the state title in 1970, the first in 13 years. Also played for Santa Cruz in 1971 and was champion again, until retiring at Maguary do Ceará.

== Honours ==
Treze

- Campeonato Paraibano: 1966

Náutico

- Campeonato Pernambucano: 1966, 1967, 1968
- Copa dos Campeões do Norte: 1966

São Paulo

- Campeonato Paulista: 1970

Santa Cruz

- Campeonato Pernambucano: 1971

Individual

- Campeonato Pernambucano top scorer: 1967
