= Ranulfo =

Brazilian footballer (1925–?)

Personal information
- Full name: Ranulfo Pereira Machado
- Date of birth: 27 May 1925
- Place of birth: Ilhéus, Brazil
- Date of death: Unknown
- Position: Forward

Youth career
- Santa Cruz (Ilhéus)

Senior career*
Years	Team	Apps	(Gls)
1947–1948	Ypiranga-BA		
1949–1952	America-RJ		
1952	Portuguesa		
1953	São Paulo	22	(4)
1953–1954	Noroeste		
- * Club domestic league appearances and goals

Ranulfo Pereira Machado (27 May 1925 – ?), simply known as Ranulfo, was a Brazilian professional footballer who played as a forward.

== Career ==
Ranulfo began his career at Santa Cruz in the city of Ilhéus, and also played for EC Ypiranga in Salvador, until being hired by America in Rio de Janeiro in 1949. He was successful at the club, being called up to the Rio de Janeiro state football team several times. In 1952 he moved to Portuguesa and later to São Paulo FC, where he was state champion in 1953. His last professional club was EC Noroeste.

== Personal life ==
In 1952 Ranulfo was convicted of the crime of seduction, for having impregnated an underage girl. He ended up being arrested in 1954, while defending the EC Noroeste of Bauru, and was imprisoned in the Bangu Penal Sanatorium until 1956.

== Honours ==
São Paulo

- Campeonato Paulista: 1953

Noroeste

- Campeonato Paulista Série A2: 1953
