= Vilázio =

Brazilian footballer

Personal information
- Full name: Vilázio Lelis
- Date of birth: 23 September 1937
- Place of birth: Pitangueiras, Brazil
- Date of death: 9 February 2006 (aged 68)
- Place of death: São Paulo, Brazil
- Position: Defender

Youth career
- Pinhalense

Senior career*
Years	Team	Apps	(Gls)
1960–1961	São Paulo	51	(0)
1961–1963	León		
1964	Ponte Preta		
1964	América-SP		
1965	Santa Cruz		
1966	Atlântico-RS		
1967	Jandaia-PR		
- * Club domestic league appearances and goals as of 31 December 2023

Vilázio Lelis (23 September 1937 – 9 February 2006), simply known as Vilázio, was a Brazilian professional footballer who played as a defender.

== Career ==
A vigorous defender, he began his career at Ginásio Pinhalense, and in 1960 he transferred to São Paulo FC, where he made 51 appearances. He also played for Club León de Torreón, AA Ponte Preta, América de Rio Preto, Santa Cruz, Atlântico de Erechim and Jandaia EC. He ended his career after the birth of his daughter, and owned a betting house in Vila Mariana, São Paulo.
