= Savério =

Brazilian footballer (born 1925)

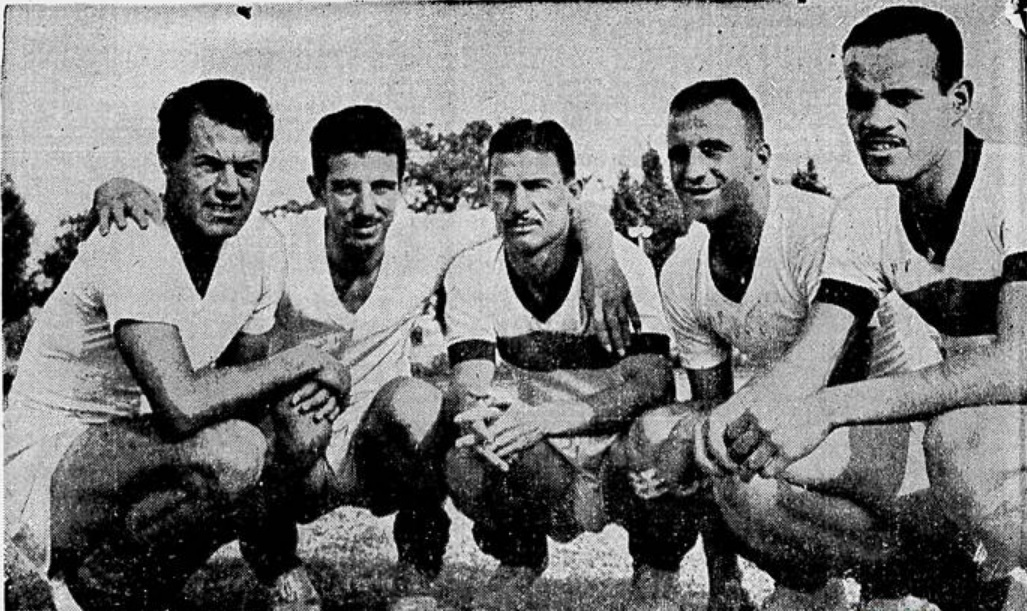
- Savério (fourth from the left) among athletes from São Paulo F.C.

Personal information
- Full name: Savério Romano
- Date of birth: 12 June 1925
- Place of birth: São Paulo, Brazil
- Position: Defender

Youth career
- 1942–1946: São Paulo

Senior career*
Years	Team	Apps	(Gls)
1943–1952	São Paulo	232	(0)
1952–1954	Comercial (SP)		
1955–1957	São Bento (SCS)		
1957–1962	Comercial (SP)		
1962–1963	Ourinhense		
- * Club domestic league appearances and goals as of 5 September 2023

Savério Romano (born 12 June 1925), simply known as Savério, is a Brazilian former professional footballer who played as a defender.

== Career ==
Formed in the youth and amateur sector of São Paulo in the 1940s, he became part of the team at the end of the "Rolo Compressor" era. Then he transferred to Comercial de São Paulo, where he played most of the 50s, including in the period of AA São Bento, when Comercial was merged with São Caetano EC. Savério ended his career in 1962, at CA Ourinhense of Ourinhos city.

== Honours ==
São Paulo

- Campeonato Paulista: 1946, 1948, 1949
- Taça dos Campeões Estaduais Rio-São Paulo: 1945, 1948
- Torneio Início: 1945
