= Orozimbo dos Santos =

Brazilian footballer

Orozimbo
Personal information
- Full name: Orozimbo dos Santos
- Date of birth: 12 July 1911
- Place of birth: Ribeirão Preto, Brazil
- Place of death: Unknown
- Position: Midfielder

Senior career*
| Years | Team | Apps | (Gls) |
| 1932–1935 | São Paulo | | |
| 1935–1939 | Fluminense | | |
| 1940–1941 | São Paulo | | |
| 1942–1943 | São Paulo Railway | | |
- * Club domestic league appearances and goals as of 30 August 2023

Orozimbo dos Santos (12 July 1911 – ?) was a Brazilian professional footballer who played as midfielder.

== Career ==
Dos Santos was one of the players with most appearances for São Paulo FC (137 in total), alongside Armandinho (149), Luisinho (127), Araken Patusca (124) and Friedenreich (124). With Fluminense, Orozimbo was part of the Campeonato Carioca conquest for three times in a row.

Dos Santos' only cap for Brazil was for the unofficial match against River Plate on 24 February 1935.

== Honours ==
=== São Paulo ===
- Torneio dos Cinco Clubes: 1934

=== Fluminense ===
- Campeonato Carioca: 1936 (LCF), 1937, 1938
