= Penachio =

Brazilian footballer

Personal information
- Full name: Carlos Alberto Penachio
- Date of birth: 28 February 1946
- Place of birth: Santo André, Brazil
- Date of death: 10 November 2017 (aged 71)
- Place of death: São Bernardo do Campo, Brazil
- Position: Defender

Youth career
- São Paulo

Senior career*
Years	Team	Apps	(Gls)
1964–1967	São Paulo	24	(0)
1965	→ América-SP (loan)		
1967	→ Uberaba (loan)		
1968–1970	Atlético Paranaense		
1971	Mercedes-Benz		
- * Club domestic league appearances and goals as of 27 December 2023

Carlos Alberto Penachio (28 February 1946 – 10 November 2017), better known as Penachio, was a Brazilian professional footballer who played as a defender.

== Career ==
Penachio was successful when playing for São Paulo with the world champion Hilderaldo Bellini. In 1968, both players were transferred to Atlético Paranaense.

He ended his career in 1971, at AA Mercedes-Benz, when he began working at the company as a production technician.

== Death ==
Died due to respiratory problems, 10 November 2017, in São Bernardo do Campo.
