= Riberto =

Brazilian footballer (born 1933)

Personal information
- Full name: Oswaldo Riberto
- Date of birth: 30 August 1933
- Place of birth: Braúna, Brazil
- Date of death: 23 June 1993 (aged 59)
- Place of death: São Paulo, Brazil
- Position: Left back

Youth career
- 1952–1953: Ypiranga-SP

Senior career*
Years	Team	Apps	(Gls)
1953–1955	Ypiranga-SP		
1955	Ponte Preta		
1956–1964	São Paulo	481	(19)
- * Club domestic league appearances and goals as of 10 June 2023

Oswaldo Riberto (30 August 1933 — 23 June 1993), was a Brazilian former professional footballer who played as a left back. He is the tenth player with the most games played for São Paulo FC, totaling 481 appearances. Riberto played for the club mainly during the 60s, when the Estádio do Morumbi was built.

His nickname was British, due to the punctuality for which he presented himself for activities.

== Honours ==
São Paulo

- Campeonato Paulista: 1957
- Small Club World Cup: 1963
