= Gérsio =

Brazilian footballer (1931–2018)

Personal information
- Full name: Gérsio Passadore
- Date of birth: 11 October 1931
- Place of birth: São Paulo, Brazil
- Date of death: 30 July 2018 (aged 86)
- Place of death: Brasília, Brazil
- Positions: Defender; midfielder

Youth career
- –1950: Nacional-SP

Senior career*
| Years | Team | Apps | (Gls) |
| 1950 | Nacional-SP | | |
| 1951–1958 | Palmeiras | 192 | (3) |
| 1952 | → XV de Jaú (loan) | | |
| 1958–1961 | São Paulo | 153 | (4) |
- * Club domestic league appearances and goals as of 27 September 2023

Gérsio Passadore (11 October 1931 – 30 July 2018), simply known as Gérsio, was a Brazilian professional footballer who played as a defender and midfielder.

== Career ==
Gérsio came into football with Nacional. He was hired by Palmeiras in 1951 but did not play until 1952. After Palmeiras, he still played for São Paulo, but did not win official titles. Due to the similarity in playing style, he was often compared to Zito from Santos FC. Years after retiring, he became a lawyer and president of the entity that represented athletes from the state of São Paulo.

== Honours ==
Palmeiras

- Copa Rio: 1951
