= Adílson (footballer, born 1974) =

Brazilian footballer

Personal information
- Full name: Adílson Cândido de Souza
- Date of birth: 28 May 1974 (age 52)
- Place of birth: Minas Gerais, Brazil
- Height: 1.87 m (6 ft 1 1/2 in)
- Position: Goalkeeper

Senior career*
Years	Team	Apps	(Gls)
1995–1996	Atlético Mineiro		
2003	Rio Branco		
2004–2012	Ceará		
2010	→ Sertãozinho (loan)		
2013–2015	Santo André		
- * Club domestic league appearances and goals

Adilson Cândido de Souza (born 28 May 1974) is a retired Brazilian association football goalkeeper.

== Career ==
Adílson played with Atlético Mineiro, Palmeiras - MT, Sãocarlense, FC Botafogo, Rio Branco and Ceará.

Adílson fans refer to him as The big wall, because he has accomplished several difficult saves. He completed 200 games against the Itapipoca team, wearing the Alvinegro shirt.

Adílson played with the champion team, Porangabussu, in 2006 and defended a penalty levied by Rinaldo, the striker from their biggest rival.

== Career statistics ==
Club performance			League		Cup		Total	
Season	Club	League	Apps	Goals	Apps	Goals	Apps	Goals
Brazil			League		Copa do Brasil		Total	
2008	Ceará	Brasileiro Série B	29^{1}	0			?	?
2009	Ceará	Brasileiro Série B	^{2}	0	2	0		0

^{1} 2008 Campeonato Cearense statistics not known
^{2}Include 24 appearances in 2009 Campeonato Cearense
