= Valdir Birigui =

Brazilian footballer (1943–2024)

Personal information
- Full name: Valdir Gadioli da Silva
- Date of birth: 26 November 1943
- Place of birth: Birigui, Brazil
- Date of death: 22 March 2024 (aged 80)
- Place of death: São Paulo, Brazil
- Position: Forward

Youth career
- –1963: Bandeirante

Senior career*
| Years | Team | Apps | (Gls) |
| 1963–1964 | Bandeirante | | |
| 1964–1966 | São Paulo | 64 | (21) |
| 1966–1967 | Botafogo | | |
| 1967–1968 | Portuguesa | | |
| 1969–1973 | Saad | | |
| 1974–1975 | Paysandu | | |
| 1976–1977 | Saad | | |
- * Club domestic league appearances and goals as of 9 October 2023

Valdir Gadioli da Silva (26 November 1943 – 22 March 2024), better known as Valdir Birigui, was a Brazilian professional footballer who played as a forward.

== Career ==
Valdir started his career at Bandeirante de Birigui, city that incorporated in the name, and was signed by São Paulo in 1964. He also played for Botafogo, where he was champion in 1967. Valdir also played for Portuguesa, Saad EC de São Caetano do Sul and Paysandu. He was part of the squad that made the first European trip with São Paulo FC.

== Honours ==
Botafogo

- Campeonato Carioca: 1967
- Taça Guanabara: 1967

== Death ==
Valdir Birigui died in São Paulo, 22 March 2024, aged 80.
