= Lourival (footballer, born 1945) =

Brazilian footballer

Personal information
- Full name: Lourival Prudêncio de Carvalho
- Date of birth: 31 January 1945 (age 81)
- Place of birth: Barretos, Brazil
- Position: Midfielder

Senior career*
Years	Team	Apps	(Gls)
1964–1966	Noroeste		
1967–1972	São Paulo	113	(18)
1970	→ Bonsucesso (loan)		
1970	→ Mixto (loan)		
1970–1971	→ Bahia (loan)		
1971	→ Santa Cruz (loan)		
1973–1974	Atlético Paranaense		
1974–1975	Sampaio Corrêa		
1976	Mixto		
1977	Goiânia		
- * Club domestic league appearances and goals as of 30 September 2023

Lourival Prudêncio de Carvalho (born 31 January 1945), simply known as Lourival, is a Brazilian former professional footballer, who played as a midfielder.

== Career ==
Defensive midfielder with extreme calm and physical strength, after standing out in the Noroeste, he was hired by São Paulo FC. In 1967, he scored a goal against Corinthians that almost gave São Paulo the title that year and in 1970, Lourival was part of the squad that ended the title drought that occurred during the construction of the Estádio do Morumbi.

== Honours ==
São Paulo

- Campeonato Paulista: 1970

Mixto

- Campeonato Matogrossense: 1970

Sampaio Corrêa

- Campeonato Maranhense: 1975
