= Samuel Arruda =

Brazilian footballer (1949–2006)

Samuel
Personal information
- Full name: Samuel Arruda
- Date of birth: 31 March 1949
- Place of birth: Mogi Guaçu, Brazil
- Date of death: 4 February 2006 (aged 56)
- Place of death: Campinas, Brazil
- Position: Centre-back

Youth career
- –1967: Ponte Preta

Senior career*
Years	Team	Apps	(Gls)
1967–1970	Ponte Preta		
1971–1975	São Paulo	105	(0)
1976–1977	Palmeiras	63	(0)
1977	Sport Recife		
1978	Noroeste		
- * Club domestic league appearances and goals as of 30 September 2023

Samuel Arruda (31 August 1949 – 4 February 2006), was a Brazilian professional footballer, who played as a centre-back.

== Career ==
Trained in the youth sectors at Ponte Preta, Samuel stood out for his quality on the ball, even dribbling past attackers on several occasions. He transferred to São Paulo FC and became champion in 1975. The following year he went to Palmeiras to become champion again, and in 1977, this time in Sport, he added a Pernambuco title. Samuel ended his career in 1980 after losing one of his eyes in an accident.

== Honours ==
São Paulo

- Campeonato Paulista: 1975

Palmeiras

- Campeonato Paulista: 1976

Sport Recife

- Campeonato Pernambucano: 1977

== Death ==
Samuel died in 2006, in Campinas, while working, due to a heart attack.
