= Mário (footballer, born 1923) =

Brazilian footballer (1923–1998)

Personal information
- Full name: Mário de Oliveira
- Date of birth: 10 April 1923
- Place of birth: Jaguarão, Brazil
- Date of death: 24 March 1998 (aged 74)
- Place of death: Porto Alegre, Brazil
- Position: Goalkeeper

Youth career
- Mauá-RS

Senior career*
Years	Team	Apps	(Gls)
1944–1948	Pelotas		
1948–1952	São Paulo	108	(0)
1953–1954	Comercial-RP		
1955	Juventus-SP		
- * Club domestic league appearances and goals

Mário de Oliveira (10 April 1923 – 24 March 1998), simply known as Mário, was a Brazilian professional footballer who played as a goalkeeper.

== Career ==
Mário began his career at the age of 16 at Mauá FC in the city of Jaguarão, still an amateur. His first professional club was EC Pelotas, and in 1948, he ended up transferring to São Paulo FC, becoming champion of São Paulo in 1948 and 1949. He also played for Comercial de Ribeirão Preto and Juventus da Mooca. He is the goalkeeper with the best winning record in the history of São Paulo FC.

== Honours ==
São Paulo

- Campeonato Paulista: 1948, 1949
- Taça dos Campeões Estaduais Rio-São Paulo: 1948
