= Tenente (footballer) =

Brazilian footballer

Personal information
- Full name: Waldir Isaú Pereira
- Date of birth: 18 October 1941
- Place of birth: Criciúma, Brazil
- Date of death: 12 March 1996 (aged 54)
- Place of death: Criciúma, Brazil
- Position: Left back

Youth career
- Metropol

Senior career*
Years	Team	Apps	(Gls)
1961–1964	Metropol		
1964	Vasco da Gama	0	(0)
1965–1972	São Paulo	187	(3)
1968	→ Bahia (loan)		
- * Club domestic league appearances and goals as of 23 September 2023

Waldir Isaú Pereira (18 October 1941 – 12 March 1996), better known as Tenente, was a Brazilian professional footballer who played as a left back.

== Career ==
An employee of Carbonifera Metropolitana de Criciúma, the company that owned EC Metropol at the time, ended up demonstrating talent in football games among employees and received a chance in professional football. He had a brief spell at Vasco da Gama where he received no opportunities, and went to São Paulo FC. He was part of the first squad to win a title at the Estádio do Morumbi.

== Personal life ==
Waldir received the nickname "Tenente" (English: Lieutenant) at São Paulo FC, as he ended up accidentally shooting after playing with a revolver inside the club's changing rooms.

== Honours ==
Metropol

- Campeonato Catarinense: 1961, 1962

São Paulo

- Campeonato Paulista: 1970, 1971

== Death ==
Died in a traffic accident in his hometown Criciúma, at age 54.
