= Adilson (Portuguese footballer) =

Portuguese footballer (born 1987)

Personal information
- Full name: Nélson Alexandre Vieira Semedo
- Date of birth: 25 November 1987 (age 38)
- Place of birth: Lisbon, Portugal
- Height: 1.80 m (5 ft 11 in)
- Position: Winger

Team information
- Current team: G.D Vialonga

Youth career
- 1996–1999: Alverca
- 2000–2006: Povoense

Senior career*
Years	Team	Apps	(Gls)
2006–2008	Povoense		
2008–2009	Cartaxo	9	(4)
2009–2012	Futebol Benfica	31	(10)
2012–2013	Atlético	34	(8)
2013–2015	Belenenses	1	(0)
2013–2014	→ União Madeira (loan)	37	(3)
2015	→ Olhanense (loan)	17	(1)
2015–2016	Varzim	41	(0)
2016–2018	Cova Piedade	55	(1)
2018–2019	Loures	24	(0)
2019–	Pinhalnovense	5	(0)
- * Club domestic league appearances and goals as of 22 September 2019

Nélson Alexandre Vieira Semedo (born 25 November 1987 in Lisbon), known as Adilson, is a Portuguese professional footballer who plays for C.D. Pinhalnovense as a winger.
