= Osmar Rodrigues =

Brazilian footballer

Personal information
- Full name: Osmar Rodrigues
- Date of birth: 18 June 1949
- Place of birth: São Paulo, Brazil
- Date of death: 23 March 2020 (aged 70)
- Place of death: São Paulo, Brazil
- Position: Left back

Youth career
- Juventus-SP

Senior career*
| Years | Team | Apps | (Gls) |
| 1969–1973 | Juventus-SP | 42 | (1) |
| 1973–1979 | São Paulo | 39 | (0) |
| 1980 | Grêmio Maringá | | |
- * Club domestic league appearances and goals as of 23 November 2023

Osmar Rodrigues (18 June 1949 – 23 March 2020), was a Brazilian professional footballer who played as a left back.

== Career ==
A graduate of Juventus da Mooca, he played for the club until 1973, when he was hired by São Paulo FC, where he made 39 appearances and participated in the 1975 state championship and 1977 Brazilian Championship. He ended his career at Grêmio Maringá in 1980.

== Honours ==
São Paulo

- Campeonato Paulista: 1975
- Campeonato Brasileiro: 1977

== Death ==
Osmar died in São Paulo, 23 March 2020, victim of cancer.
