= Wálter Zum-Zum =

Brazilian footballer (1946–2022)

Personal information
- Full name: Wálter Anunciação Alves
- Date of birth: 15 August 1946
- Place of birth: Ponte Nova, Brazil
- Date of death: 7 November 2022 (aged 76)
- Place of death: São Paulo, Brazil
- Position: Forward

Youth career
- São Paulo

Senior career*
Years	Team	Apps	(Gls)
1964	Ferroviária		
1964–1970	São Paulo	86	(12)
1970	Portuguesa		
1971	XV de Piracicaba		
1972	São José-SP		
1972	Bonsucesso		
1973–1975	Berchem		
- * Club domestic league appearances and goals

Wálter Anunciação Alves (15 August 1946 – 7 November 2022), better known as Wálter Zum-Zum, was a Brazilian professional footballer who played as a forward.

== Career ==
Wálter Zum-Zum was trained in the club's youth categories in 1963, where he became São Paulo children's champion in 1963 and youth champion in 1964. He played for the Tricolor main team between 1964 and 1970, playing 86 matches, with 42 wins, 30 draws and 14 defeats, and scoring 12 goals. He ended his career at Berchem in Belgium.

== Death ==
Wálter died on 7 November 2022, due to liver problems.
