= Barbirotto =

Brazilian footballer (born 1959)

Personal information
- Full name: Antônio Barbeirotti Júnior
- Date of birth: 19 September 1959 (age 67)
- Place of birth: São Paulo, Brazil
- Position: Goalkeeper

Youth career
- 1971: Palmeiras
- 1973–1979: São Paulo
- 1977–1978: → Goiânia (loan)

Senior career*
Years	Team	Apps	(Gls)
1978–1985	São Paulo	55	(0)
1978–1979	→ Goiás (loan)		
1980	→ Catanduvense (loan)		
1982	→ Ferroviário (loan)		
1985	→ América-SP (loan)		
1986	Juventus-SP		
1986	Ferroviário		
1986	Joinville		
1987	Ponte Preta		
1988	Joinville		
1988	Bangu		
1988–1989	Bragantino		
1989	América-SP		
1989	XV de Piracicaba		
1989	Ferroviário		
1990	Caxias		
1991–1992	Noroeste		

Managerial career
- 2002: Juventude (goalkeepers coach)
- 2004: São Caetano (goalkeepers coach)
- 2006: Jabaquara
- 2010: Santos (goalkeepers coach)
- 2010–2011: Atlético Mineiro (goalkeepers coach)
- 2011: Internacional (goalkeepers coach)
- 2013: Náutico (goalkeepers coach)
- 2015–2020: Santos youth (goalkeepers coach)
- * Club domestic league appearances and goals

Antônio Barbeirotti Júnior (born 19 September 1959), better known as Barbirotto, is a Brazilian former professional footballer, manager and goalkeeper coach, who played as a goalkeeper.

== Playing career ==
Barbirotto started his career at SE Palmeiras, a club he lived a few blocks away from. Years later he went to São Paulo FC, the club with which he began his professional career. Barbirotto maintained a contract with São Paulo from 1981 to 1985, being Waldir Peres reserve in most part of games. However, he was unable to establish himself in São Paulo and, from then on, he wandered around several clubs, most of them in the countryside of São Paulo state. Unsatisfied with being loaned consecutively, in 1986 he transferred to Juventus, and from then on, to several other clubs in Brazil. He stood out at Joinville in 1988, helping with the 1989 state title campaign, before moving to Bragantino.

On 22 June 1990, in a match between Caxias and Internacional, he suffered head trauma and a cardiorespiratory arrest after a strong collision with a defender. Barbirotto ended his career at EC Noroeste in 1992.

== Managerial career ==
Ten years retiring, Barbirotto became a goalkeeper trainer, working for the first time at Juventude in 2002 and then at state champion São Caetano in 2004. In 2006, he became manager for the first time, with Jabaquara, but was unsuccessful. In 2010 he became part of Dorival Júnior staff, working at Santos FC, Atlético Mineiro and Internacional alongside the coach. Was hired by Náutico in 2013, and from 2015 until the COVID-19 pandemic he worked in Santos' youth categories.

== Personal life ==
Barbirotto currently owns a bar in the city of Guarujá. He is married to former volleyball player Tata, and father of judoka Karen Barbeirotti.

== Popular culture ==
Barbirotto became part of popular culture in Brazil due to the dubbing of the series Chaves (El Chavo del Ocho), where in one episode the protagonist played by Chespirito states that he would like to be Barbirotto in a game about penalty kicks.

== Honours ==
São Paulo

- Campeonato Paulista: 1985
