= Sylvio Hoffmann =

Brazilian footballer

Personal information
- Full name: Sylvio Hoffmann Mazzi
- Date of birth: 15 May 1908
- Place of birth: Rio de Janeiro, Brazil
- Date of death: 15 November 1991 (aged 83)
- Position: Midfielder

Senior career*
Years	Team	Apps	(Gls)
1925–1926	Vasco da Gama		
1927–1928	Fluminense		
1929	São Cristovao		
1930–1932	Santos		
1933	Peñarol		
1933–1934	São Paulo		
1934–1935	Botafogo		

International career
1930–1937	Brazil		
- * Club domestic league appearances and goals

Sylvio Hoffmann Mazzi (15 May 1908 – 15 November 1991) was a Brazilian football player. He has played for the Brazil national team.
