= King (footballer, born 1917) =

Brazilian footballer (born 1917)

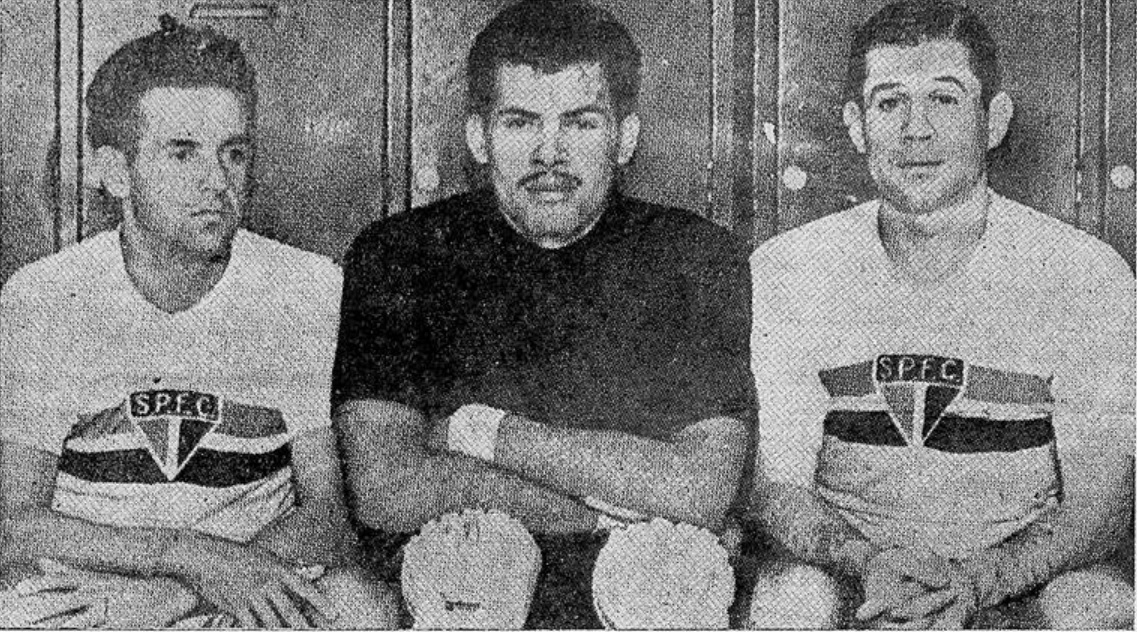
- King, at the center

Personal information
- Full name: Nivacir Innocêncio Fernandes
- Date of birth: January 6, 1917
- Place of birth: Curitiba, Brazil
- Date of death: 14 April 1978 (aged 61)
- Place of death: Suzano, Brazil
- Position: Goalkeeper

Senior career*
Years	Team	Apps	(Gls)
1932–1933	Elite-PR		
1934–1935	Palestra Itália-PR		
1936–1938	São Paulo		
1938	Flamengo		
1939–1947	São Paulo		
1948–1949	XV de Piracicaba		
- * Club domestic league appearances and goals as of 10 June 2023

Nivacir Innocêncio Fernandes was a Brazilian professional footballer who played as a goalkeeper for São Paulo FC from 1936 to 1947, making a total of 203 appearances, being considered the first great goalkeeper in the club's history.

His nickname derives from the King Kong (1933 film), since his hands were so big that he could hold the ball in just one hand.

== Personal life ==
King is the young brother of the also footballer Teleco. The date and place of his death are unknown.

== Honours ==
=== São Paulo ===
- Campeonato Paulista: 1943, 1945, 1946
- Taça Cidade de São Paulo: 1944
- Taça dos Campeões Estaduais Rio-São Paulo: 1943
- Torneio Início: 1940

=== XV de Piracicaba ===
- Campeonato Paulista Série A2: 1948
