= Ney Roz =

Brazilian footballer

Ney
Personal information
- Full name: Rodney Roz
- Date of birth: 11 November 1953 (age 72)
- Place of birth: Sorocaba, Brazil
- Position: Defender

Youth career
- -1972: São Bento

Senior career*
| Years | Team | Apps | (Gls) |
| 1972–1975 | São Bento | | |
| 1975–1976 | Santos | | |
| 1976–1979 | Botafogo-SP | | |
| 1980–1981 | São Paulo | 105 | (1) |
| 1982–1986 | São Bento | | |

Managerial career
- 1994: Atlético Sorocaba
- 2012: Capivariano
- * Club domestic league appearances and goals as of 26 September 2023

Rodney Roz (born 11 November 1953), simply known as Ney Roz or Ney, is a Brazilian former professional footballer who played as a defender.

== Career ==
The fourth player who had more appearances for EC São Bento, Nei also had great spells at Botafogo de Ribeirão Preto and São Paulo FC, where he was two-time champion of the Campeonato Paulista and runner-up in Campeonato Brasileiro in 1981, becoming team captain on some occasions.

== Honours ==
Botafogo-SP

- Taça Cidade de São Paulo: 1977

São Paulo

- Campeonato Paulista: 1980, 1981
