= Aylton Lataria =

Brazilian footballer

Personal information
- Full name: Francisco Aylton Dias
- Date of birth: 26 January 1942
- Place of birth: Santo André, Brazil
- Date of death: 23 June 2008 (aged 66)
- Place of death: Santo André, Brazil
- Position: Forward

Youth career
- Palestrinha (Santo André)

Senior career*
Years	Team	Apps	(Gls)
1958–1959	Ypiranga		
1960–1962	São Paulo	30	(15)
1963–1964	Ferroviária		
1964–1965	CA Pirelli		
1965	Paulista		
1966	Londrina		
1966–1967	Saad		
- * Club domestic league appearances and goals as of 17 October 2023

Francisco Aylton Dias (26 January 1942 – 23 June 2008), better known as Aylton Lataria, was a Brazilian professional footballer who played as a forward.

== Career ==
Aylton started his career at Palestrinha, an amateur team from Santo André, and caught the attention of Ypiranga, but with the end of the team in the early 60s he ended up at São Paulo, where he played for two seasons. He also played for Ferroviária, Paulista, CA Pirelli, Londrina and Saad.
