= Mendes (footballer, born 1912) =

Brazilian footballer (1912–?)

Personal information
- Full name: Joaquim Mendes da Costa
- Date of birth: 25 January 1912
- Place of birth: São João da Boa Vista, Brazil
- Date of death: Unknown
- Position: Forward

Youth career
- Sanjoanense
- Amparo

Senior career*
Years	Team	Apps	(Gls)
1932–1933	AA São Bento		
1934	Santos		
1935	Palestra Itália		
1936	Fluminense		
1937	Estudante Paulista		
1938–1942	São Paulo	94	(24)
1942	Juventus-SP		
1943	Ponte Preta		
- * Club domestic league appearances and goals as of 23 February 2024

Joaquim Mendes da Costa (25 January 1912 – ?), simply known as Mendes, was a Brazilian professional footballer who played as a forward.

== Career ==
Starting his career at SE Sanjoanense, Mendes also played for Sarkis and Amparo AC before turning professional in 1932 at AA São Bento. With the end of the team, he defended Santos FC in 1934 and Palestra Itália in 1935. In 1936 he was part of Fluminense's state champion squad, and in 1937 he returned to São Paulo to play for CA Estudante Paulista. In 1938, with the club's incorporation into São Paulo FC, he joined the team and made 94 appearances scoring 24 goals. He played for the São Paulo state team and Juventus and Ponte Preta before retiring.

== Honours ==
Fluminense

- Campeonato Carioca: 1936 (LCF)

São Paulo

- Torneio Início: 1940
