= Adílson (footballer, born 1943) =

Brazilian footballer

Personal information
- Full name: Adílson Alves Moreira
- Date of birth: 28 August 1943 (age 83)
- Place of birth: São Paulo, Brazil
- Position: Midfielder

Youth career
- –1966: Corinthians

Senior career*
| Years | Team | Apps | (Gls) |
| 1965–1966 | Corinthians | 0 | (0) |
| 1965 | → Inter de Limeira (loan) | | |
| 1966–1968 | São Paulo | 40 | (22) |
| 1968–1970 | Atlético Mineiro | | |
| 1970–1971 | Santa Cruz | | |
| 1971–1980 | Farense | | |
| 1980–1982 | Salgueiros | | |
| 1982–1983 | Espinho | | |
- * Club domestic league appearances and goals as of 28 September 2023

Adílson Alves Moreira (born 28 August 1943), simply known as Adílson, is a Brazilian former professional footballer, who played as a midfielder.

== Career ==
Adílson started in the youth sectors at Corinthians. At São Paulo FC, he played between 1966 and 1968. In 1969, moved to Atlético Mineiro and, shortly afterwards, to Santa Cruz, where he was Pernambuco champion in 1970. Then played in Portuguese football, where Adílson played for Farense, Salgueiros and Espinho.

== Personal life ==
Years after retiring from football, Adílson worked at a security company.

== Honours ==
Santa Cruz

- Campeonato Pernambucano: 1970
