= Deleu (footballer, born 1940) =

Brazilian footballer

Personal information
- Full name: Wanderlei dos Santos
- Date of birth: 9 March 1940 (age 86)
- Place of birth: Bebedouro, Brazil
- Position: Right back

Youth career
- Inter de Bebedouro

Senior career*
Years	Team	Apps	(Gls)
1961–1965	São Paulo	169	(0)
1965–1967	Guarani		
- * Club domestic league appearances and goals as of 26 September 2023

Wanderlei dos Santos (born 9 March 1940), better known as Deleu, is a Brazilian former professional footballer who played as a right back.

== Career ==
Revealed at Internacional de Bebedouro, he arrived at São Paulo FC along with another athlete on the team, the forward Sabino. He was an excellent on tackle, being considered the terror of left wingers. Deleu ended his career at Guarani FC in 1967.

== Personal life ==
Deleu's nickname was originally Delei (from Wanderlei), but due to a newspaper error it ended up being Deleu. As the player got angry with the confusion, Deleu ended up scoring among the other athletes. He was a staunch anti-smoking activist, at a time when most football players smoked frequently. Years after retiring, he became a bailiff in Paraná.

== Honours ==
São Paulo

- Small Club World Cup: 1963
