= Paulo Martins (footballer, born 1960) =

Brazilian footballer

Personal information
- Full name: Paulo Martins Fernandes
- Date of birth: 1 December 1960 (age 65)
- Place of birth: Itabirito, Brazil
- Position: Midfielder

Youth career
- Atlético Mineiro

Senior career*
Years	Team	Apps	(Gls)
1980–1984	Atlético Mineiro	12	(1)
1982–1983	→ Juventus-SP (loan)		
1984	→ América-SP (loan)		
1985	Ferroviária		
1986	Bahia		
1987–1988	São Paulo	38	(0)
1988–1990	Flamengo	9	(0)
1989	→ XV de Piracicaba (loan)		
1990	→ Vitória (loan)		
1990–1991	América Mineiro		
1992	Catanduvense		
- * Club domestic league appearances and goals as of 27 December 2023

Paulo Martins Fernandes (born 1 December 1960), better known as Paulo Martins, is a Brazilian former professional footballer who played as a midfielder.

== Career ==
Formed in the youth categories of Atlético Mineiro, Paulo Martins was state champion in 1981. He played for the club until 1984, being loaned to Juventus and América de Rio Preto during the period. He played for Ferroviária and Bahia, until arriving at São Paulo FC in 1987, where he was once again part of the state champion squad. He also played for Flamengo and ended his career at Catanduvense in 1992.

== Honours ==
Atlético Mineiro

- Campeonato Mineiro: 1981

São Paulo

- Campeonato Paulista: 1987

Flamengo

- Taça Guanabara: 1989
