= Sylvio (footballer, born 1934) =

Brazilian footballer

Personal information
- Full name: Sylvio de Paula Ferreira
- Date of birth: 22 February 1934
- Place of birth: São José dos Campos, Brazil
- Date of death: 13 January 2017 (aged 82)
- Place of death: São José dos Campos, Brazil
- Position: Right winger

Youth career
- Taubaté

Senior career*
Years	Team	Apps	(Gls)
1954–1956	Taubaté		
1957–1960	São Paulo	51	(2)
1961–1962	XV de Piracicaba		
- * Club domestic league appearances and goals as of 29 December 2023

Sylvio de Paula Ferreira (22 February 1934 – 13 January 2017), simply known as Sylvio, was a Brazilian professional footballer who played as a right winger.

== Career ==
Sylvio started in the amateur sectors of EC Taubaté, and in 1954 scored the winning goal for Taubaté over Comercial de Ribeirão Preto in the late First Division (current Série A2). He later played for São Paulo, once again being champion, as Maurinho reserve on the winning team in 1957.

== Honours ==
Taubaté

- Campeonato Paulista Série A2: 1954

São Paulo

- Campeonato Paulista: 1957

== Death ==
Sylvio died in the city of São José dos Campos, 13 January 2017, aged 82.
