= Virgílio (footballer, born 1943) =

Brazilian footballer

Personal information
- Full name: Virgílio Salgado de Camargo
- Date of birth: 11 January 1943 (age 83)
- Place of birth: São Paulo, Brazil
- Positions: Centre-back; defensive midfielder

Youth career
- –1960: São Paulo

Senior career*
Years	Team	Apps	(Gls)
1961–1965	São Paulo	36	(0)
1965	XV de Piracicaba		
1966–1968	Juventus		
1968	Ponte Preta		
1969	Uberlândia		
1969–1971	Alianza		
- * Club domestic league appearances and goals as of 9 October 2023

Virgílio Salgado de Camargo (born 11 January 1943), primarily known as Virgílio, is a Brazilian former professional footballer who played as a centre-back and defensive midfielder.

== Career ==
Virgílio played for São Paulo FC in the early 1960s and later played for XV de Piracicaba, Juventus, Ponte Preta, and Uberlândia. He ended his career in El Salvador, playing for Alianza FC. He was part of the squad that made the first European trip with São Paulo FC.
