= Aílton Lira =

Brazilian footballer (born 1951)

Aílton Lira da Silva, best known as Aílton Lira (born in Araras, São Paulo State, February 19, 1951) was a former football (soccer) forward who currently manages Limeira Futebol Clube.

In career he played for Ponte Preta (1967–1972), Caldense (1972–1976), Santos F.C. (1976–1979), São Paulo Futebol Clube (1980), Al-Nassr in Saudi Arabia (1980–1982), Guarani (1982), União São João de Araras (1983), Comercial-Ribeirão Preto (1983), Portuguesa Santista (84 and 85), Itumbiara (1986–1987) and Guará where ended his career in 1988. He won the São Paulo State Championship Tournament two times; in 1978 for Santos and in 1980 for São Paulo.
