= Waldir Peres =

Brazilian footballer and manager (1951–2017)

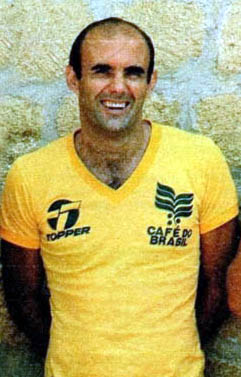
- Peres with Brazil at the 1982 World Cup

Personal information
- Full name: Waldir Peres de Arruda
- Date of birth: January 2, 1951
- Place of birth: Garça, Brazil
- Date of death: July 23, 2017 (aged 66)
- Place of death: Mogi das Cruzes, Brazil
- Height: 1.86 m (6 ft 1 in)
- Position: Goalkeeper

Senior career*
Years	Team	Apps	(Gls)
1970–1973	Ponte Preta	2	(0)
1973–1984	São Paulo	617	(0)
1984	América	21	(0)
1984–1985	Guarani	26	(0)
1986	Corinthians	15	(0)
1988	Portuguesa	22	(0)
1988–1989	Ponte Preta		
1989–1990	Santa Cruz	1	(0)

International career
1975–1982	Brazil	39	(0)

Managerial career
- 1990: Inter de Limeira
- 1991: São Bento
- 1993: União Mogi
- 1994: São Bento
- 1994: Inter de Limeira
- 1995: União Mogi
- 1996: Nacional-SP
- 1997: Ferroviária
- 1998: Nacional-SP
- 1998: Guarulhos
- 1999: Itabaiana
- 2000: Nacional-SP
- 2001: Paraguaçuense
- 2002: Rio Branco-PR
- 2003: Oeste
- 2004: Rio Branco-PR
- 2006: Uberlândia
- 2007: Vitória-ES
- 2007: Araguaína
- 2008: Inter de Limeira
- 2008: Engenheiro Beltrão
- 2013: Grêmio Maringá
- * Club domestic league appearances and goals

Waldir Peres de Arruda (January 2, 1951 – July 23, 2017), known as Waldir Peres, was a Brazilian footballer who played as a goalkeeper, in particular with São Paulo and the Brazil national team.

== Playing career ==
=== Club ===
At club level, Peres was mainly known for his time with São Paulo.

=== International ===
At international level, Peres had his first match it was the second semi final match during the 1975 Copa América on 4 October 1975 against Peru, Brazil won the match with a score of 0-2. Peres capped in total 30 times for Brazil between October 1975 and July 1982; he was a member of the Brazil national team at the World Cup 1974, 1978 and 1982. He played five games at the 1982 World Cup.

== Coaching career ==
In 2006, Peres was appointed as the Vitória-ES U-18 team manager during the Copa São Paulo de Juniores.

== Death ==
Peres died in 2017 of a heart attack; he was 66.

== Personal life ==
Peres's daughter Erika Peres was also a footballer.

== Honours ==
=== Club ===
São Paulo

- Campeonato Brasileiro Série A: 1977
- Campeonato Paulista: 1975, 1978, 1980, 1981

Corinthians

- Campeonato Paulista: 1988

Santa Cruz

- Campeonato Pernambucano: 1990

=== Individual ===
- Brazilian Golden Ball: 1975
- Brazilian Silver Ball: 1975
