= List of São Paulo FC records and statistics =

São Paulo FC is an association football club based in São Paulo, Brazil. Being one of the most successful and well-known clubs in the country, with a crowd of approximately 20 million fans, the club founded on 25 January 1930 has a series of records and achievements, some of them unique in all of Brazilian football.

== Players ==
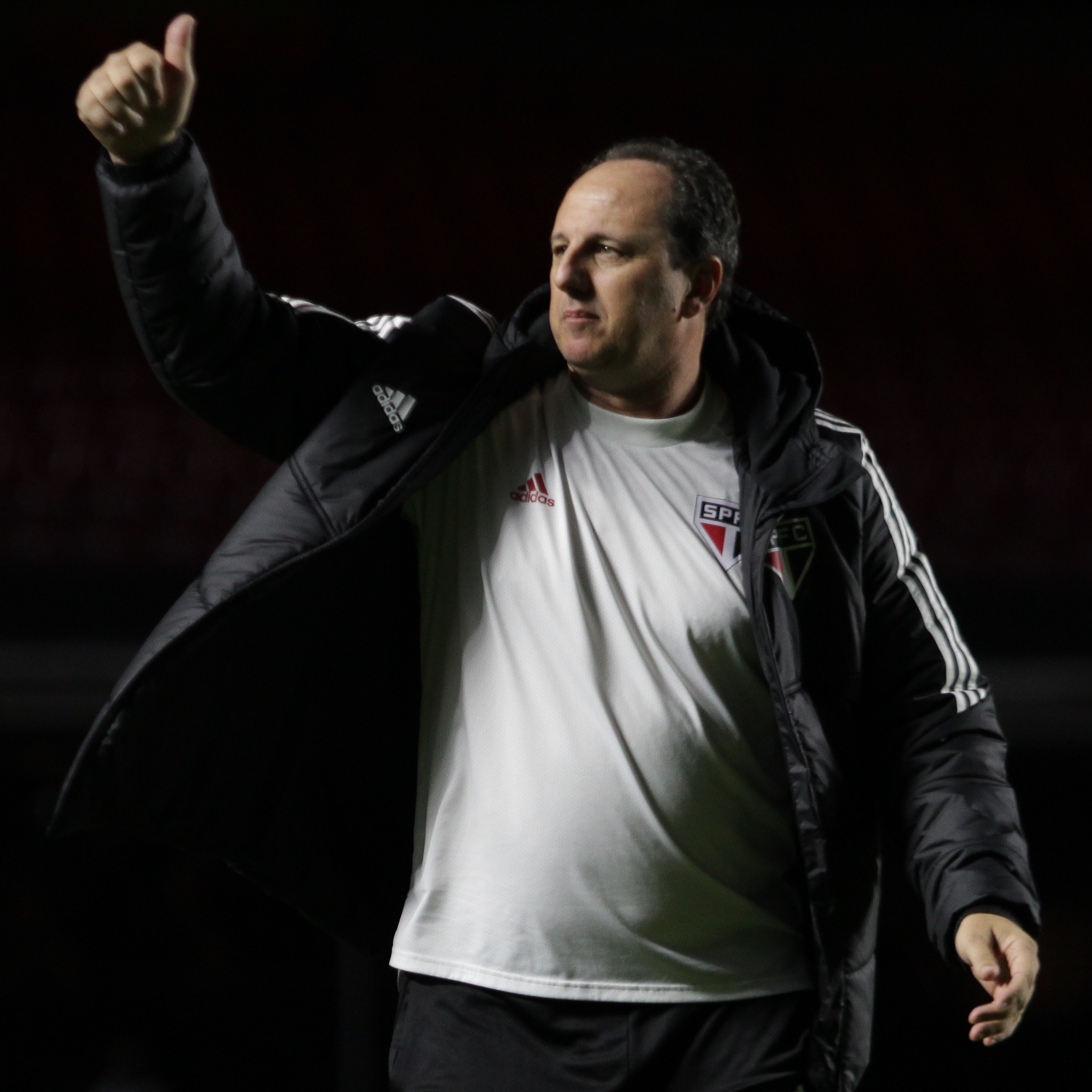
Rogério Ceni: 131 goals, 1237 matches, 978 matches as the captain

=== Appearances ===
Following is the list of the players with most appearances for São Paulo:

Rank	Player	Position	Years	Total
1	Rogério Ceni	GK	1990–2015	1237
2	Waldir Peres	GK	1973–1984	617
3	Nílton de Sordi	RB	1952–1965	544
4	Roberto Dias	CB / DM	1960–1973	527
5	José Poy	GK	1949–1962	525
5	Teixeirinha	FW	1939–1956	525
7	Nelsinho	LB	1979–1992	512
8	Terto	FW	1968–1977	500
9	Mauro Ramos	CB	1948–1959	498
10	Riberto	LB	1956–1964	481

- Most appearances in Copa Libertadores: **90** – Rogério Ceni
- Most appearances in Campeonato Brasileiro Série A: **575** – Rogério Ceni
- Most appearances in Copa do Brasil: **67** – Rogério Ceni
- Most appearances in Campeonato Paulista: **343** – Waldir Peres
- Most appearances in 20th century: **617** – Waldir Peres
- Most appearances in 21st century: **906** – Rogério Ceni
- Most appearances has a captain: **978** – Rogério Ceni
- Most consecutive appearances: **132** – Rogério Ceni (23 January 2010 − 26 October 2011)
- Most appearances in a single season: **79** – Zetti, 1992
- Player with most major trophies: **18** – Rogério Ceni
- Youngest player in 20th century: **15 years, 311 days** – Zizinho, 15 April 1978, vs. Guaxupé
- Youngest player in 21st century: **16 years, 170 days** – Leandro Alves, 27 March 2003, 1–1 vs. Al-Ittihad Tripoli
- Oldest player: **42 years, 276 days** – Rogério Ceni, 28 October 2015, 1–3 vs. Santos
- The first line-up: Nestor, Clodô, Barthô, Boock, Zito, Alves, Luisinho, Milton, Friedenreich, Seixas, Zuanella.

=== Goals scored ===
Following is the list of the players with most goals scored for São Paulo:

Rank	Player	Position	Years	Matches	Goals	Ratio
1	Serginho Chulapa	FW	1973–1982	399	242	0.61
2	Gino Orlando	FW	1953–1962	453	233	0.51
3	Luis Fabiano	FW	2001–2015	352	212	0.6
4	Teixeirinha	FW	1939–1956	525	188	0.36
5	França	FW	1996–2002	327	182	0.56
6	Luisinho	FW	1930–1947	263	173	0.66
7	Müller	FW	1984–1996	387	160	0.41
8	Leônidas da Silva	FW	1942–1950	211	144	0.68
9	Maurinho	FW	1952–1959	347	136	0.39
10	Rogério Ceni	GK	1990–2015	1237	131	0.11

- Most goals scored in Copa Libertadores: **14** – Luis Fabiano, Rogério Ceni
- Most goals scored in Campeonato Brasileiro Série A: **108** – Luis Fabiano
- Most goals scored in Copa do Brasil: **24** – Luis Fabiano
- Most goals scored in Campeonato Paulista: **142** – Gino Orlando
- Most goals scored in 20th century: **242** – Serginho Chulapa
- Most goals scored in 21st century: **212** – Luis Fabiano
- Most goals scored in a single season: **54** – Dodô, 1997
- Most goals scored in a single match: **6** – Antonio Sastre, 14 August 1943, 9–0 vs. Portuguesa Santista
- Most hat-tricks scored: **13** – França
- Most consecutive goals: **28 goals in 11 matches** – Waldemar de Brito
- Most times finished as a top scorer: **6** – Luis Fabiano
- Most times finished a season as the club top scorer: **7** – Serginho Chulapa
- Best goals scored/matches ratio: **1.08** – Waldemar de Brito, 85 goals scored in 78 matches
- First goal scored: **Barthô** – 23 March 1930, 6–1 vs. Juventus (SP)
- First goal scored at Estádio do Morumbi: **Peixinho** – 2 October 1960, 1–0 vs. Sporting CP
- Fastest goal scored: **10 seconds** – Zé Roberto, 26 February 1969, 4–1 vs. São Bento
- Latest goal in regular time: **90+9 minute** – Nathan, 22 July 2023, 1–2 vs. Cuiabá
- Youngest goalscorer in overall: **15 years, 311 days** – Zizinho, 15 April 1978, vs. Guaxupé
- Youngest goalscorer in a professional match: **16 years, 172 days** – Armando José, 30 July 1939, 1–0 vs. Portuguesa Santista
- Oldest goalscorer: **42 years, 214 days** – Rogério Ceni, 26 August 2015, 3–0 vs. Ceará
- Most goals scored by a goalkeeper: **131** – Rogério Ceni
- Most goals scored by a defender: **78** – Roberto Dias
- Most goals scored by a midfielder: **128** – Raí
- Most goals scored by a foreign player: **119** – Pedro Rocha

==== List of topscorers ====
Player	Year	Championship	Goals
Waldemar de Brito	1933	Campeonato Paulista	21
Waldemar de Brito	1933	Torneio Rio-São Paulo	33
Elyseo	1938	Campeonato Paulista	13
Luisinho	1944	Campeonato Paulista	22
Friaça	1949	Campeonato Paulista	24
Zezinho	1956	Campeonato Paulista	16
Gino Orlando	1958	Torneio Rio-São Paulo	12
Toninho Guerreiro	1970	Campeonato Paulista	13
Toninho Guerreiro	1972	Campeonato Paulista	17
Pedro Rocha	1972	Campeonato Brasileiro	17
Toninho Guerreiro	1972	Copa Libertadores	6
Pedro Rocha	1974	Copa Libertadores	7
Terto	1974	Copa Libertadores	7
Serginho Chulapa	1975	Campeonato Paulista	22
Serginho Chulapa	1977	Campeonato Paulista	32
Careca	1985	Campeonato Paulista	23
Careca	1986	Campeonato Brasileiro	25
Müller	1987	Campeonato Brasileiro	10
Palhinha	1992	Copa Libertadores	7
Raí	1992	Intercontinental Cup	2
Müller	1993	Intercontinental Cup	1
Palhinha	1993	Intercontinental Cup	1
Toninho Cerezo	1993	Intercontinental Cup	1
Euller	1994	Recopa Sudamericana	1
Guilherme	1994	Recopa Sudamericana	1
Leonardo	1994	Recopa Sudamericana	1
Juninho	1994	Copa CONMEBOL	5
Bentinho	1995	Campeonato Paulista	25
Palhinha	1995	Copa de Oro	1
Almir	1996	Copa Master de CONMEBOL	6
Dodô	1997	Campeonato Paulista	19
Dodô	1998	Torneio Rio-São Paulo	5
França	1998	Campeonato Paulista	12
França	2000	Campeonato Paulista	18
França	2001	Torneio Rio-São Paulo	6
Luís Fabiano	2001	Copa dos Campeões	5
Luís Fabiano	2002	Campeonato Brasileiro	19
Luís Fabiano	2003	Campeonato Paulista	8
Luís Fabiano	2004	Copa Libertadores	8
Amoroso	2005	FIFA Club World Cup	2
Aloísio Chulapa	2006	Copa Libertadores	5
Luís Fabiano	2012	Copa do Brasil	8
Aloísio	2013	Recopa Sudamericana	1
Luís Fabiano	2014	Campeonato Paulista	9
Jonathan Calleri	2016	Copa Libertadores	9
Gilberto	2017	Campeonato Paulista	9
Luciano	2020	Campeonato Brasileiro	18
Brenner	2020	Copa do Brasil	6
Giuliano Galoppo	2023	Campeonato Paulista	8

=== Goalkeepers ===
The vast majority of records related to the goal of São Paulo are held by Rogério Ceni, but are some other great achievements made by other goalkeepers who played for the club.

- Most clean sheets: **418** – Rogério Ceni
- Most clean sheets in Campeonato Paulista: **153** – Waldir Peres
- Most clean sheets in Campeonato Brasileiro: **184** – Rogério Ceni
- Most clean sheets in Copa Libertadores: **40** – Rogério Ceni
- Longest streak without conceding a goal (all matches):
  - 9 matches (883 minutes): 10 May 1972 – 30 July 1972, goalkeeper Sérgio Valentim
- Longest streak without conceding a goal in Campeonato Paulista matches:
  - 10 matches (1017 minutes): 16 April 1972 – 6 August 1972, goalkeeper Sérgio Valentim
- Longest streak without conceding a goal in Campeonato Brasileiro matches:
  - 9 matches (988 minutes): 5 August 2007 – 8 September 2007, goalkeeper Rogério Ceni
- Longest streak without conceding a goal in Copa Libertadores matches:
  - 8 matches (808 minutes): 25 February 2010 – 28 July 2010, goalkeeper Rogério Ceni
- Most defenses in penalty kick: **50** – Rogério Ceni
- Most victories in penalty shoot-out: **12** – Rogério Ceni
- Most assists: **7** – Rogério Ceni
- Best average of goals conceded in more than 50 games: **0.66** – Toinho (86 goals suffered in 131 appearances)
- Most goals conceded in a single match: **8** – King, 10 July 1940, 1–8 vs. Botafogo
- Youngest goalkeeper: **17 years, 11 days** – Naim, 1 May 1978, 2–0 vs. Usina Santa Elisa
- Oldest goalkeeper: **42 years, 276 days** – Rogério Ceni, 28 October 2015, 1–3 vs. Santos
- Goalkeepers who have scored a goal: **2** – Moscatto (1), Rogério Ceni (131)
- Outfield players who played in goal:
  - Luisinho, 1 May 1931, 2–3 vs. Palestra Itália. Luisinho suffered 1 goal.
  - Cozinheiro, 20 June 1937, 3–1 vs. São Paulo Railway. Not suffered goals.
  - Rui, 16 April 1947, 1–5 vs. Corinthians. Rui suffered 4 goals.
  - Juliano Belletti, 10 May 2000, 1–2 vs. Santos. Not suffered goals.
  - Gustavo Nery, 24 July 2003, 1–2 vs. Ponte Preta. Nery suffered 1 goal.
  - Maicon Roque, 21 April 2016, 1–1 vs. The Strongest. Not suffered goals.

=== Disciplinary ===
The main data for the disciplinary records of São Paulo:

- Most yellow cards received: **97** – Rogério Ceni
- Most red cards received: **16** – Serginho Chulapa, Luís Fabiano
- Most cards (yellow+red) received: **111** – Luís Fabiano (95+16)
- Never sent-off in more than 600 appearances: **617** – Waldir Peres
- Never sent-off in more than 100 appearances in Campeonato Brasileiro: **180** – Hernanes
- Never received a card in more than 200 appearances: **243** – Pablo Forlan
- Never received a card in Copa Libertadores matches: **14** – Adílson

=== Foreign players ===
List of foreign players by country (in bold, currently in São Paulo) who were listed by the first team squad of the club:

- Argentina 35:
  - José Carlos Ponzinibio (1934–1935, 1938–1940)
  - Juan Castagno (1940)
  - Teófilo Juárez (1940)
  - Antonio Sastre (1943–1946)
  - Armando Renganeschi (1944–1948)
  - José Poy (1949–1962)
  - Elmo Bovio (1950)
  - Héctor Gonzalez (1950–1951)
  - Gustavo Albella (1952–1954)
  - Eduardo Di Loreto (1952–1953)
  - Nicolás Moreno (1952–1953)
  - Rinaldo Martino (1953)
  - Juan José Negri (1953–1955)
  - Alfredo Runtzer (1954)
  - Gregorio Beraza (1956–1957)
  - Luis Bonelli (1956–1957)
  - Pedro Prospitti (1966)
  - Horacio Ameli (2002)
  - Adrián González (2009–2010)
  - Marcelo Cañete (2011–2014)
  - Clemente Rodríguez (2013)
  - Ricardo Centurión (2015–2016)
  - **Jonathan Calleri** (2016, 2021–)
  - Andrés Chávez (2016–2017)
  - Julio Buffarini (2016–2017)
  - Lucas Pratto (2017)
  - Jonathan Gómez (2017–2020)
  - Martín Benítez (2021)
  - Emiliano Rigoni (2021–2022, 2025)
  - Giuliano Galoppo (2022–2025)
  - Nahuel Bustos (2022)
  - **Alan Franco** (2023–)
  - Santiago Longo (2024–2025)
  - **Enzo Díaz** (2025–)
  - Juan Dinenno (2025)
- Uruguay 19:
  - Emilio Almiñana (1930–1931)
  - Aparizio Vega (1934–1935)
  - Daniel Gutiérrez (1936)
  - Graciano Acosta (1937–1938)
  - Herculano Squarza (1940–1942)
  - Vicente Ramón (1941–1942)
  - Eusebio Urruzmendi (1951)
  - Pablo Forlán (1970–1975)
  - Pedro Rocha (1970–1978)
  - Darío Pereyra (1977–1988)
  - Rubén Furtenbach (1985–1986)
  - Diego Aguirre (1990)
  - Juan Ramón Carrasco (1990)
  - Gustavo Matosas (1993)
  - Diego Lugano (2003–2006, 2016–2017)
  - Álvaro Pereira (2014)
  - Gonzalo Carneiro (2018–2021)
  - Gabriel Neves (2021–2023)
  - Michel Araújo (2023–2024)
- Paraguay 9:
  - Rubén Barrios (1944–1947)
  - Cecilio Martínez (1963–1965)
  - Carlos Safuán (1968–1969)
  - Néstor Isasi (1997–1999)
  - Celso Ayala (2000)
  - Iván Piris (2011–2012)
  - Antonio Galeano (2020–2021)
  - **Damián Bobadilla** (2024–)
  - **Carlos Coronel** (2026–)
- Chile 8:
  - Roberto Rojas (1987–1989)
  - José Luis Sierra (1994–1995)
  - Manuel Neira (1995)
  - Gabriel Mendoza (1996)
  - Claudio Maldonado (2000–2003)
  - Nélson Saavedra (2009)
  - Eugenio Mena (2016)
  - **Gonzalo Tapia** (2025–)
- Portugal 8:
  - Laurentino Melo (1936)
  - Antonio Azambuja (1946–1949)
  - Antonio Fernandes (1966–1967)
  - João Moreira (2022–2026)
  - Marcos Paulo (2023)
  - **Cédric Soares** (2025–)
  - **Aurélio Buta** (2026–)
  - **Domingos Duarte** (2026–)
- Colombia 7:
  - Víctor Aristizábal (1996–1998)
  - Dorlan Pabón (2014)
  - Wilder Guisao (2015–2016)
  - Santiago Tréllez (2018–2021)
  - Luis Manuel Orejuela (2021–2025)
  - Andrés Colorado (2022)
  - James Rodríguez (2023–2024)
- Ecuador 5:
  - Héctor Carabalí (1999)
  - Néicer Reasco (2006–2008)
  - **Robert Arboleda** (2017–)
  - Joao Rojas (2018–2021)
  - Jhegson Méndez (2023–2024)
- Italy 3:
  - Éder (2021–2022)
  - André Anderson (2022)
  - **Rafael Tolói** (2025–)
- Spain 2:
  - Fernando Carazo (1936)
  - Juanfran (2019–2021)
- Romania 2:
  - Waldemar Zaclis (1938–1943)
  - Constantin de Maria (1951)
- Venezuela 2:
  - Alexander Rondón (2004)
  - Nahuel Ferraresi (2022–2026)
- Cyprus 1:
  - Abraham Ben-Lulu (1967)
- Czechoslovakia 1:
  - František Šafránek (1964)
- El Salvador 1:
  - Juan Francisco Barraza (1964)
- Hungary 1:
  - José Lengyl (1933–1934)
- Japan 1:
  - Musashi Mizushima (1985)
- Northern Ireland 1:
  - Jamal Lewis: (2024)
- Peru 1:
  - Christian Cueva (2016–2018)
- Russian Empire 1:
  - Eugênio Chemp (1936–1941)
- Senegal 1:
  - Iba Ly: (2024–)

Notes

- Juan Francisco Barraza and František Šafránek were ceded to São Paulo could complete its line-up in the matches against Alianza and Dukla Praha, in 1964.
- Manuel Neira, Nélson Saavedra and Iba Ly never entered the field.
- Éder and André Anderson are born in Brazil, but by FIFA rules are eligible for Italy, thus considering Italian players.
- Rafael Tolói, who represented Italy at the international level, acquired his citizenship after his first time at the club and only the second spell being considered as Italian player.
- Wagner Lopes, who represented Japan at the international level, acquired his citizenship after his time at the club.
- Aloísio, who represented China at the international level, acquired his citizenship after his time at the club.
- Marlos, who represented Ukraine at the international level, acquired his citizenship after his time at the club.
- Fabiano Freitas, who represented Cyprus at the international level, acquired his citizenship after his time at the club.
- João Moreira and Marcos Paulo are born in Brazil, but represented Portugal in the youth level.
- Carlos Coronel was born in Brazil, son of a Paraguayan mother, and holds dual citizenship.
- Born in Angola, Aurélio Buta represented Portugal at the international level.

=== Internationals ===
- Most international caps as a São Paulo player: **48** – Oscar (27 August 1980 – 7 May 1986)
- Most international goals as a São Paulo player: **16** – Careca (28 April 1983 – 21 June 1986)
- Golden medalist at the Summer Olympics: **2** – Rodrigo Caio (2016), Dani Alves (2020)
- Players who have been called up from the FIFA World Cup while playing for São Paulo: **54** – Brazil 46, Uruguay 4, Ecuador 1, Colombia 1, Peru 1, Paraguay
- Players who have won the FIFA World Cup while playing for São Paulo: **13** – (in the below table, the players in **bold**)

Edition	Players	Team	Players
1934	4	Brazil	Armandinho, Luisinho, Sylvio Hoffmann, Waldemar de Brito
1950	4	Brazil	Bauer, Friaça, Noronha, Rui
1954	4	Brazil	Alfredo Ramos, Bauer, Mauro Ramos, Maurinho
1958	3	Brazil	**De Sordi**, **Dino Sani**, **Mauro Ramos**
1962	2	Brazil	**Bellini**, **Jurandir**
1966	2	Brazil	Bellini, Paraná
1970	1	Brazil	**Gérson**
1974	2	Brazil	Mirandinha, Waldir Peres
1974	2	Uruguay	Pablo Forlán, Pedro Rocha
1978	3	Brazil	Chicão, Waldir Peres, Zé Sérgio
1982	4	Brazil	Oscar, Renato, Serginho Chulapa, Waldir Peres
1986	5	Brazil	Careca, Falcão, Müller, Oscar, Silas
1986	1	Uruguay	Darío Pereyra
1990	1	Brazil	Ricardo Rocha
1994	4	Brazil	**Cafu**, **Leonardo**, **Müller**, **Zetti**
1998	2	Brazil	Denílson, Zé Carlos
1998	1	Colombia	Víctor Aristizábal
2002	3	Brazil	**Belletti**, **Kaká**, **Rogério Ceni**
2006	2	Brazil	Mineiro, Rogério Ceni
2014	1	Uruguay	Álvaro Pereira
2018	1	Peru	Christian Cueva
2022	1	Ecuador	Robert Arboleda
2026	1	Paraguay	Damián Bobadilla

=== Awards ===
- South American Footballer of the Year: **Raí** (1992), **Cafu** (1994)
- Intercontinental Cup "Man of The Match": **Raí** (1992), **Toninho Cerezo** (1993)
- Toyota Award (Copa Libertadores best player): **Amoroso** (2005)
- Adidas Golden Ball (FIFA Club World Cup best player): **Rogério Ceni** (2005)

==== Ballon d'Or ====
- Player who have made his professional debut for São Paulo and have won the Ballon d'Or: **Kaká** – 2007, playing for AC Milan
- Player who have played for São Paulo after won the Ballon d'Or: **Rivaldo** – 2011 (has won the 1999 Ballon d'Or playing for FC Barcelona)

Kaká also returned to São Paulo on the 2014 season.

==== Guinness World records ====
In 2014, Rogério Ceni received certification for three records established at the end of the 2013 season: most matches for the same team (1117), goalkeeper with most goals scored (113) and player who most times captained a club (886) . At the end of his career in 2015, the final numbers are as follows:

- Association football goalkeeper who have scored more goals in the history: **Rogério Ceni** – 131 goals
- Association football player who have more appearances for one club: **Rogério Ceni** – 1237 matches
- Association football player who have more matches as captain for one club: **Rogério Ceni** – 978 matches

The records remain unbeatable until the present moment.

Other record

- On 16 November 1994, Juninho Paulista played two games for São Paulo. The first was during the first leg of the Copa CONMEBOL quarter-finals against Sporting Cristal from Peru (3–1 win) with São Paulo using their reserve team. In the second, he come on as a second-half substitute against Grêmio in the Campeoanto Brasileiro (also with a 3–1 win).

==== Bola de Prata ====
The Bola de Prata is the most traditional award in Brazilian football, which has chosen the "Best XI" in the editions of the Campeonato Brasileiro, since 1971:

- Bola de Prata (best XI) award winners playing for São Paulo: **58**
- Bola de Ouro (best player) award winners playing for São Paulo: **5** – Waldir Peres (1975), Careca (1986), Ricardo Rocha (1989), Kaká (2002), Rogério Ceni (2008)

Rogério Ceni was also awarded with a special honor ("Conjunto da Obra") in 2015, when he announced his retirement.

==== Prêmio Craque do Brasileirão ====
- Craque do Brasileirão (best player) award winners playing for São Paulo: **3** – Rogério Ceni (2006, 2007), Hernanes (2008)
- Craque da Galera (supporters choice) award winners playing for São Paulo: **3** – Rogério Ceni (2007, 2014), Hernanes (2017)
- Revelação do Campeonato (best young player) award winners playing for São Paulo: **1** – Breno (2007)

==== Troféu Mesa Redonda ====
- Troféu Mesa Redonda Best Player award winners playing for São Paulo: **4** – Hernanes (2008, 2017), Rogério Ceni (2005), Mineiro (2006)

==== Prêmio Melhores do Paulistão ====
- Craque do Paulistão (Campeonato Paulista best player): **1** – Martín Benítez (2021)

== Managerial records ==
Following is the list of the main managerial records of São Paulo:

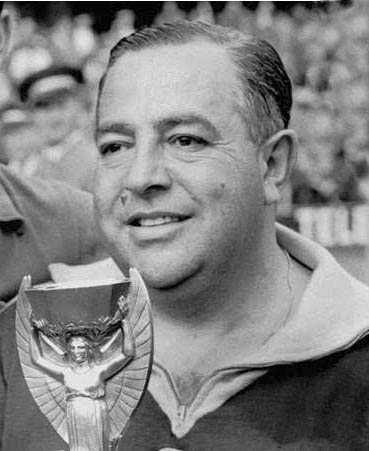
Vicente Feola, winner of 1958 FIFA World Cup

=== Most matches ===
Rank	Manager	Years	Total
1	Vicente Feola	1937–1959	555
2	Muricy Ramalho	1994–2015	474
3	José Poy	1964–1982	422
4	Telê Santana	1973–1996	410
5	Cilinho	1984–1988	249
6	Joreca	1943–1947	172
7	Rubens Minelli	1977–1979	166
8	Carlos Alberto Silva	1980–1990	154
9	Rogério Ceni	2017–2023	143
10	Osvaldo Brandão	1962–1971	142

- First manager: Rubens Salles (1930–1932)
- Most official titles won: 10 – Telê Santana
- Most matches won: 310 – Vicente Feola
- Most consecutive years as manager: 5 years and 71 days – Telê Santana (10 October 1990 – 30 January 1996)
- Most consecutive matches as manager: 244 – José Poy (1973–1976)
- Best win/matches ratio with at least 60 matches: 0.75 – Clodô, 52 wins in 74 matches
- Youngest manager: 25 years, 56 days – Cosme Geraldino, 7 September 1972, 4–0 vs. Cascavel EC
- Oldest manager: 64 years, 186 days – Telê Santana, 27 January 1996, 1–1 vs. Rio Branco
- Most matches as a caretaker: 31 – Milton Cruz

=== Awards ===
South American Coach of the Year

- Best manager of South America: 1 – Telê Santana (1992)

Prêmio Craque do Brasileirão

- Best manager of Campeonato Brasileiro: 3 – Muricy Ramalho (2006, 2007, 2008)

Prêmio Melhores do Paulistão

- Best manager of Campeonato Paulista: 2 – Hernán Crespo (2021), Rogério Ceni (2022)

=== Achievements ===
Champions as a player and manager for São Paulo:

- José Poy
  - Player: 3 – 1949 Campeonato Paulista, 1953 Campeonato Paulista, 1957 Campeonato Paulista
  - Manager: 1 – 1975 Campeonato Paulista
- Muricy Ramalho
  - Player: 2 – 1975 Campeonato Paulista, 1977 Campeonato Brasileiro Série A
  - Manager: 5 – 1994 Copa CONMEBOL, 1996 Copa Master de CONMEBOL, 2006 Campeonato Brasileiro Série A, 2007 Campeonato Brasileiro Série A, 2008 Campeonato Brasileiro Série A
- Nelsinho Baptista
  - Player: 1 – 1975 Campeonato Paulista
  - Manager: 1 – 1998 Campeonato Paulista

== Honours ==
The club has a total of 44 official competitive honours, in addition to other historic achievements. Following are the main titles won by São Paulo:

=== Major competitions ===
==== Worldwide ====
- Intercontinental Cup:
  - Winners (2): 1992, 1993
- FIFA Club World Cup:
  - Winners: 2005
- Suruga Bank Championship:
  - Runners-up: 2013

==== Continental ====
- Copa Libertadores:
  - Winners (3): 1992, 1993, 2005
  - Runners-up (3): 1974, 1994, 2006
- Supercopa Libertadores:
  - Winners: 1993
  - Runners-up: 1997
- Recopa Sudamericana:
  - Winners (2): 1993, 1994
  - Runners-up (2): 2006, 2013
- Copa CONMEBOL:
  - Winners: 1994
- Copa Master de CONMEBOL:
  - Winners: 1996
- Copa Sudamericana:
  - Winners: 2012
  - Runners-up: 2022
- Copa de Oro:
  - Runners-up (2): 1995, 1996

==== National ====
- Campeonato Brasileiro Série A:
  - Winners (6): 1977, 1986, 1991, 2006, 2007, 2008
  - Runners-up (6): 1971, 1973, 1981, 1989, 1990, 2014
- Copa do Brasil:
  - Winners: 2023
  - Runners-up: 2000
- Supercopa do Brasil:
  - Winners: 2024
- Copa dos Campeões:
  - Runners-up: 2001
- Copa dos Campeões da Copa Brasil:
  - Runners-up: 1978

==== Regional ====
- Campeonato Paulista:
  - Winners (22): 1931, 1943, 1945, 1946, 1948, 1949, 1953, 1957, 1970, 1971, 1975, 1980, 1981, 1985, 1987, 1989, 1991, 1992, 1998, 2000, 2005, 2021
  - Runners-up (25): 1930, 1932, 1933, 1934, 1938, 1941, 1944, 1950, 1952, 1956, 1958, 1962, 1963, 1967, 1972, 1978, 1982, 1983, 1994, 1996, 1997, 2003, 2006, 2019, 2022
- Supercampeonato Paulista:
  - Winners: 2002
- Torneio Rio-São Paulo:
  - Winners: 2001
  - Runners-up (4): 1933, 1962, 1998, 2002

=== Other competitions ===
==== International ====
- Taça Ministro das Relações Exteriores (1): 1941
- Taça Coletividade Brasileira (1): 1945
- Taça Malmö FF (1): 1949
- Trofeo Jarrito (1): 1955
- Small Club World Cup (2): 1955, 1963
- I Copa São Paulo – Torneio Internacional do Morumbi (1): 1957
- Torneo Quadrangular de Cali (1): 1960
- Torneo Pentagonal de Guadalajara (1): 1960
- Taça Sporting CP (1): 1960
- Taça Deputado Mendonça Falcão (1): 1960
- Taça Club Nacional (1): 1963
- I Triangular de El Salvador (1): 1964
- Coppa Città di Firenzi (1): 1964
- Troféu Sport Lisboa e Benfica (1): 1968
- Trofeo Colombino (1): 1969
- Troféu Seleções do Reader's Digest (1): 1970
- Troféu José Alves Marques (1): 1971
- Trofeo Cyro Ciambruno (1): 1974
- Trofeo Federación Mexicana de Fútbol (1): 1981
- Troféu Nabi Abi Chedid (1): 1981
- Sunshine International Series (1): 1982
- Taça Real Madrid CF (1): 1986
- Jamaica Cup (1): 1987
- Trinidad & Tobago Cup (1): 1987
- Torneo Hexagonal de Guadalajara (1): 1989
- Stora 100 years Trophy (1): 1988
- Super Soccer Cup – India (2): 1989, 2007
- KKT Gahara Cup (1): 1989
- Copa Amistad Brazil–Chile (1): 1990
- Copa Solidariedad de León (1): 1990
- Ciutat de Barcelona Trophy (2): 1991, 1992
- Ramón de Carranza Trophy (1): 1992
- Teresa Herrera Trophy (1): 1992
- Torneo Ciudad de Santiago – Chile (1): 1993
- Trofeo Santiago de Compostela (1): 1993
- Los Angeles Soccer Cup (2): 1993, 1999
- Trofeo Jalisco (1): 1993
- Trofeo San Lorenzo de Almagro (1): 1994
- Trofeo Bortolotti (1): 1995
- Copa Cerveza Cristal (1): 1996
- Torneo de Club Hermanos (1): 1997
- Torneo Pachuca Cuña de Mexico (1): 1999
- Copa Euro-América (1): 1999
- Torneio Constantino Cury (1): 2000
- Eusébio Cup (1): 2013
- Florida Cup (1): 2017

==== National ====
- Taça Governador Regis Pacheco (1): 1954
- Torneio Triangular de Uberaba (1): 1954
- Taça Prefeito Hermano de Almeida (1): 1975
- Torneio Nunes Freire (1): 1976
- II Copa São Paulo (1): 1976
- Torneio Triangular de Maringá (1): 1976
- Troféu Antônio Inácio da Silva (1): 1979
- Troféu Jacy Scanacatta (1): 1982
- Torneio Triangular Luiz Henrique Rosas (1): 1985
- Taça Oscar Bernardi (1): 1985
- Taça Centro Esportivo de Ceres (1): 1986
- Torneio Quadrangular Governador José Moraes (1): 1986
- Troféu José Lopes (1): 1990
- Torneio Rei Dadá (1): 1995
- Copa dos Campeões Mundiais (2): 1995, 1996

==== Regional ====
- Taça dos Campeões Estaduais Rio – São Paulo (11): 1931, 1943, 1945, 1946, 1948, 1954, 1958, 1975, 1980, 1985, 1987
- Torneio Início Paulista (3): 1932, 1940, 1945
- Torneio dos Cinco Clubes (1): 1934
- Taça Dr. Cunha Bueno (1): 1930
- Taça General Eurico Gaspar Dutra (1): 1943
- Olímpíada Tricolor (1): 1944
- Taça Cidade de São Paulo (1): 1944
- Torneio Pentagonal R. Monteiro (1): 1949
- Torneio Prefeito Lineu Prestes (1): 1950
- Torneio Quadrangular Paulista (1): 1952
- Taça Armando Arruda Pereira (1): 1952
- Torneio Roberto Gomes Pedrosa (1): 1956
- Taça Charles Miller (1): 1956
- Taça Piratininga (4): 1967, 1969, 1970, 1971
- Torneio Triangular Piracicabano (1): 1976
- Troféu Aniversário de Ribeirão Preto (1): 1995

=== Reserve team ===
From 1904 to 1998, during some seasons, the Campeonato Paulista de Aspirantes (also called Campeonato Paulista de Segundos Quadros) was played simultaneously with the Campeonato Paulista main level. The competition was prepared at reserve teams dispute and newly promoted players from the youth sectors. The following editions were conquered by São Paulo:

- Campeonato Paulista de Aspirantes (18): 1933 (APEA), 1938, 1940, 1942, 1943, 1944, 1945, 1946, 1947, 1953, 1954, 1955, 1958 (Extra), 1960, 1962, 1976, 1993, 1995
- Festival da APEA (1): 1931
- Torneio Quadrangular de Rio Verde (1): 1988
- Torneio Eduardo José Farah (1): 1988
- Copa João Jorge Saad (1): 1997
- Antigua and Barbuda Independence Cup (1): 2002

=== Youth sectors ===
U–23

- Campeonato Brasileiro Sub-23 (1): 2018

U–20

- Campeonato Paulista Sub-20 (9): 1954, 1955, 1956, 1987, 1995, 1999, 2000, 2011, 2016
- Taça Luiz Hugo (1): 1956
- Troféu Amizade Brasil-Japão (1): 1986
- Taça Belo Horizonte de Juniores (2): 1987, 1997
- Copa São Paulo de Futebol Júnior (5): 1993, 2000, 2010, 2019, 2025
- Copa Latino-Americana (1): 1995
- Niigata International Youth Soccer Tournament (1): 1995
- Blue Stars/FIFA Youth Cup (2): 1999, 2000
- Tournoi Espoirs U-20 de Monthey (2): 1999, 2000
- Copa Brasil 500 anos (1): 1999
- Copa Intercontinental Centenário Sub-20 (1): 2000
- L'Alcúdia International Football Tournament (1): 2001
- Copa do Brasil Sub-20 (5): 2015, 2016, 2018, 2024, 2025
- Copa Ouro Sub-20 (3): 2015, 2016, 2017
- Copa RS Sub-20 (3): 2015, 2016, 2017
- U-20 Copa Libertadores (1): 2016
- Supercopa do Brasil Sub-20 (1): 2018

U–19

- Campeonato Paulista Juvenil Sub-19 (1): 1964
- Tournoi International Juniors U-19 de Croix (1): 1993
- Dallas Cup (4): 1995, 2007, 2009, 2024
- Future Cup (1): 2017

U–18

- Campeonato Paulista Juvenil Sub-18 (8): 1942, 1946, 1954, 1969, 1970, 1973, 1976, 1979
- AFC Ajax Centenary Trophy (1): 2000
- Weifang Cup (1): 2013
- U-18 Aspire Tri-Series (1): 2017

U–17

- Torneio Adhemar de Barros (1): 1960
- Campeonato Paulista Sub-17 (8): 1963, 1982, 1991, 1995, 2006, 2015, 2016, 2019
- Mundialito de La Seu d'Urgell (1): 1983
- Al Wahda Cup (1): 1994
- Citta di Gradisca-Trofeo Nereo Rocco (1): 1998
- Mundial de Clubes de La Comunidad de Madrid Sub-17 (2): 2007, 2008
- Desafio Pelé de Futebol Internacional Sub-17 (1): 2007
- Copa Independência de Futebol Sub-17 (1): 2010
- Copa do Brasil Sub-17 (2): 2013, 2020
- Taça Belo Horizonte de Juniores (2): 2016, 2017
- Copa Ouro Sub-17 (2): 2016, 2017
- U-17 Aspire Tri-Series (1): 2017
- J-League Challenge Cup Sub-17 (1): 2018
- FAM Cup Sub-17 (2): 2018, 2019
- Supercopa do Brasil Sub-17 (1): 2020
- Copa Criciúma Sub-17 (1): 2023
- Copa Buh Sub-17 (1): 2023
- Copa New Balance Sub-17 (1) 2025

U–16

- Campeonato Paulista Infantil / Juvenil C (3): 1954, 1977, 1978
- Torneio Nacional de Integração Infantil (1): 1974
- Taça COFI Sub-16 (3): 1989, 1990, 1992
- Torneio Internacional Rolando Marques (2): 1995, 1996
- Zayed International Youth Cup (1): 2008
- Salvador Cup (2): 2016, 2017
- U-16 Aspire Tri-Series (1): 2017
- Paulista Cup Sub-16 (2): 2017, 2018
- Hooray Cup (1): 2024

U–15

- Campeonato Paulista Sub-15 (10): 1984, 1989, 1992, 1995, 1997, 1999, 2007, 2008, 2014, 2018
- Copa Votorantim Sub-15 (6): 1991, 1992, 2013, 2014, 2016, 2024
- Torneio Brasil-Japão (5): 1997, 1998, 2007, 2009, 2018
- Copa Nike Sub-15 (5): 1998, 2002, 2006, 2007, 2009
- Manchester United Premier Cup (2): 2002, 2009
- Copa Nike Sub 15 – Setor Estadual (1): 2007
- Copa do Brasil Sub-15 (1): 2008
- Copa 2 de Julho (1): 2011
- Caju's Winter Cup (1): 2021
- Torneio Footmania Caldas da Rainha Sub-15 (1): 2023
- Copa Buh Sub-15 (1): 2023
- Copa Fictor Sub-15 (1): 2026

U–14

- Campeonato Paulista Infantil Sub-14 (4): 1973, 1975, 1976, 2024
- Copa São Carlos de Futebol Mirim (2): 1986, 1987
- Tokyo International Tournament (2): 2009, 2024
- Torneio Laudo Natel (1): 2015
- Torneio Interclubes de Cotia (1): 2015
- Paulista Cup Série Prata Sub-14 (1): 2018
- Alcans South America Cup (1): 2023
- Sfera Cup Sub-14 (1): 2025

U–13

- Vegalta Cup (2): 2003, 2004
- Torneio Mundial de Shizuoka (1): 2004
- Campeonato Base Brasil 2020 (1): 2015
- Gothia Cup (1): 2016
- Peace Cup: (1): 2016
- Torneio CFA Pres. Laudo Natel (1): 2018
- Campeonato Paulista Sub-13 (1): 2019

U-12

- Paulista Cup Sub-12 (1): 2024

U–11

- Mundialito de Futebol Pré-Mirim (1): 1989
- Campeonato Paulista Sub-11 (2): 2018, 2024
- Leme Cup Sub-11 (1): 2024
- Copa Santa Cruz da Conceição (1): 2024

U–10

- Paulista Cup Sub-10 (1): 2024

=== Footvolley ===
- Liga Nacional de Futevôlei 3×3 (3): 2013, 2014, 2022
- Mundial de Futevôlei 3×3 (1): 2014

Teams

- 2013–14: Alex Dias, Bello, Vinícius
- 2022: Murilo Belmonte, Paulinho Sales, Zé Luís

== Participations ==
As of 2025 season

=== Campeonato Paulista record ===
São Paulo disputed the Campeonato Paulista for 96 seasons, (95 regular editions, and the 2002 Supercampeonato Paulista). Do not competed in the 1935 edition when, due to financial problems, had to negotiate the club stadium (Chácara da Floresta) with the Clube de Regatas Tietê.

1930	1931	1932	1933	1934	1935	1936	1937	1938	1939	1940	1941	1942	1943	1944	1945	1946	1947	1948	1949	1950	1951	1952	1953	1954	1955	1956	1957	1958	1959
2°	1°	2°	2°	2°	—	8°	7°	2°	5°	6°	2°	3°	1°	2°	1°	1°	4°	1°	1°	2°	4°	2°	1°	3°	3°	2°	1°	2°	4°
1960	1961	1962	1963	1964	1965	1966	1967	1968	1969	1970	1971	1972	1973	1974	1975	1976	1977	1978	1979	1980	1981	1982	1983	1984	1985	1986	1987	1988	1989
8°	3°	2°	2°	5°	5°	5°	2°	5°	3°	1°	1°	2°	8°	4°	1°	7°	3°	2°	8°	1°	1°	2°	2°	4°	1°	4°	1°	3°	1°
1990	1991	1992	1993	1994	1995	1996	1997	1998	1999	2000	2001	2002	2003	2004	2005	2006	2007	2008	2009	2010	2011	2012	2013	2014	2015	2016	2017	2018	2019
15°	1°	1°	3°	2°	5°	2°	2°	1°	3°	1°	8°	—	2°	5°	1°	2°	3°	3°	4°	4°	4°	3°	3°	6°	4°	8°	4°	3°	2°
2020	2021	2022	2023	2024	2025	2026																							
6°	1°	2°	6°	5°	3°	3°																							

=== Torneio Rio-São Paulo record ===
São Paulo disputed the Torneio Rio-São Paulo for 25 seasons. The 1934 edition only had the state stages, and the 1940 edition was not officially finalized. São Paulo did not only participated in the 1993 edition.

1933	1934	1940	1950	1951	1952	1953	1954	1955	1957	1958	1959	1960	1961	1962	1963	1964	1965	1966	1993	1997	1998	1999	2000	2001	2002
2°	NF	9°	6°	8°	7°	3°	4°	9°	7°	4°	5°	7°	8°	2°	8°	10°	6°	5°	—	4°	2°	3°	3°	1°	2°

- NF – Not finished

=== Torneio Roberto Gomes Pedrosa record ===
São Paulo disputed the Torneio Roberto Gomes Pedrosa for all the 4 seasons. On 22 December 2010, those editions are officially recognized by CBF as part of the Campeonato Brasileiro.

1967	1968	1969	1970
10°	10°	13°	14°

=== Campeonato Brasileiro Série A record ===
São Paulo disputed the Campeonato Brasileiro for 57 seasons (53, plus the 4 of Torneio Roberto Pedrosa). Since 2003 the Campeonato Brasileiro were disputed in a double round-robin system, and starting from 2006, with 20 clubs per edition.

1971	1972	1973	1974	1975	1976	1977	1978	1979	1980	1981	1982	1983	1984	1985	1986	1987	1988	1989	1990	1991	1992	1993	1994	1995	1996	1997	1998	1999	2000
2°	9°	2°	10°	5°	25°	1°	19°	—	9°	2°	6°	5°	17°	22°	1°	6°	11°	2°	2°	1°	6°	4°	6°	12°	11°	12°	15°	4°	11°
2001	2002	2003	2004	2005	2006	2007	2008	2009	2010	2011	2012	2013	2014	2015	2016	2017	2018	2019	2020	2021	2022	2023	2024	2025					
7°	5°	3°	3°	11°	1°	1°	1°	3°	9°	6°	4°	9°	2°	4°	10°	13°	5°	6°	4°	13°	9°	11°	6°	8°					

=== Copa do Brasil record ===
São Paulo disputed the Copa do Brasil for 26 seasons. From 2001 to 2012, Brazilian clubs that competed in the Copa Libertadores did not participate in the Copa do Brasil due to lack of dates.

1990	1993	1995	1996	1997	1998	1999	2000	2001	2002	2003	2011	2012	2014	2015	2016	2017	2018	2019	2020	2021	2022	2023	2024	2025	2026
QF	QF	QF	R16	R16	QF	R16	2°	QF	SF	QF	QF	SF	S3	SF	R16	S4	S4	R16	SF	QF	SF	1°	QF	R16	S5

- S3 – Third Stage
- S4 – Fourth Stage
- S5 – Fifth Stage
- R16 – Round of 16
- QF – Quarterfinals
- SF – Semi-finals

=== Copa Libertadores record ===
São Paulo disputed the Copa Libertadores for 22 seasons.

1972	1974	1978	1982	1987	1992	1993	1994	2004	2005	2006	2007	2008	2009	2010	2013	2015	2016	2019	2020	2021	2024	2025
2P	2°	1P	1P	1P	1°	1°	2°	SF	1°	2°	R16	QF	QF	SF	R16	R16	SF	PQ	GS	QF	QF	QF

- 1P – First group stage (1960–1987)
- 2P – Second group stage (1960–1987)
- PQ – Preliminary / Qualifying Stage
- GS – Group stage (1988–present)
- R16 – Round of 16
- QF – Quarterfinals
- SF – Semi-finals

=== Supercopa Libertadores record ===
São Paulo disputed the Supercopa Libertadores for 6 seasons.

1992	1993	1994	1995	1996	1997
QF	1°	SF	QF	PQ	2°

- PQ – Preliminary / Qualifying Stage
- QF – Quarterfinals
- SF – Semi-finals

=== Copa Mercosur record ===
São Paulo disputed all the 4 editions of the Copa Mercosur, but never advanced from the group stage.

1998	1999	2000	2001
GS	GS	GS	GS

=== Copa Sudamericana record ===
São Paulo disputed the Copa Sudamericana for 15 seasons. From 2007 to 2009, qualified as the Campeonato Brasileiro champions, in 2013 as the Copa Sudamericana champions holder, in 2014 as one of the lucky losers of the Copa do Brasil, and in 2020, being 3rd in Group D of the Copa Libertadores. In the other editions, São Paulo qualified for being in the best intermediate positions of the Campeonato Brasileiro that did not qualify for the Copa Libertadores.

2003	2004	2005	2007	2008	2011	2012	2013	2014	2017	2018	2020	2022	2023	2026
SF	R16	S2	QF	S1	R16	1°	SF	QF	S1	S2	S2	2°	QF	QF

- S1 – First Stage
- S2 – Second Stage
- R16 – Round of 16
- QF – Quarterfinals
- SF – Semi-finals

== Team records ==
=== Achievements ===
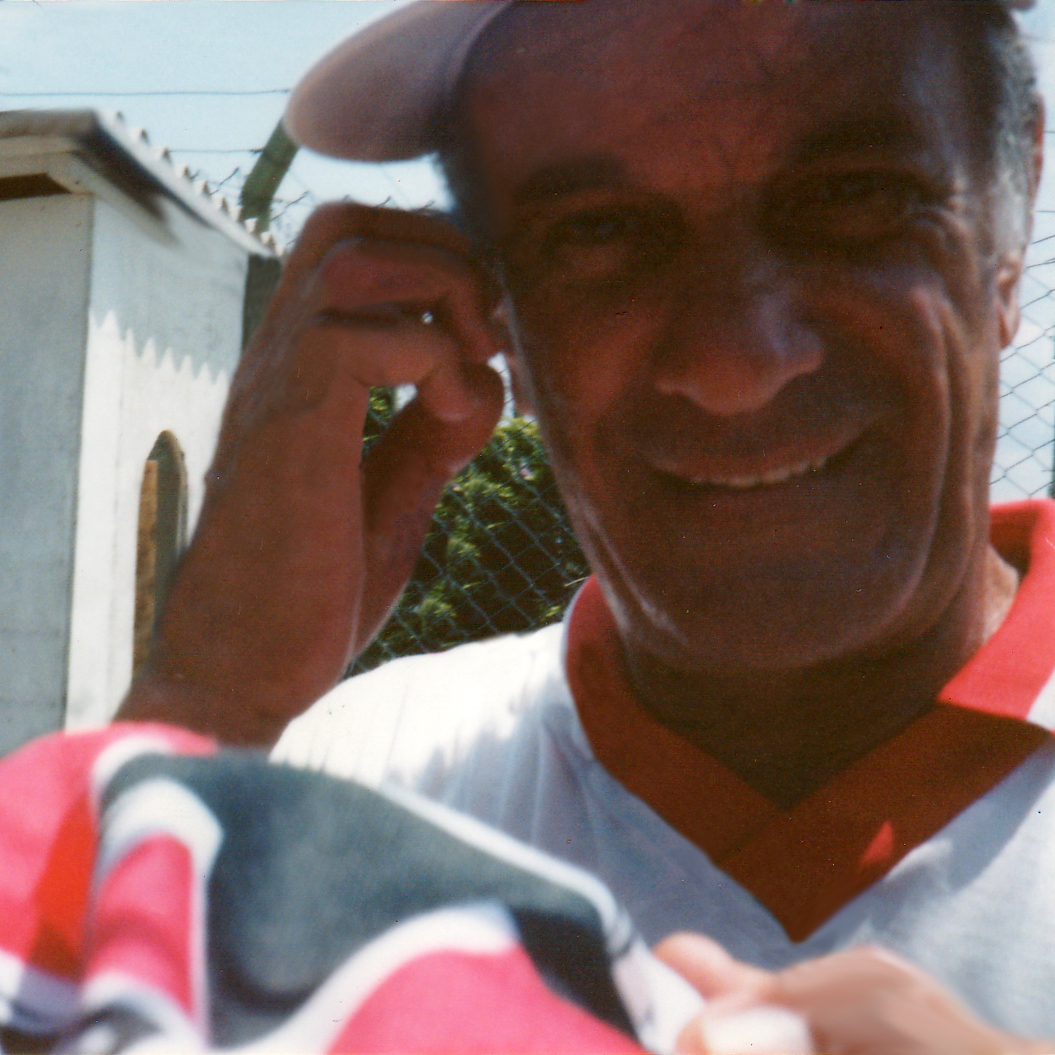
"Mestre" Telê Santana, responsible for some of the biggest achievements of São Paulo

- Brazilian club with most world championships: 3 – 1992, 1993, 2005
- Brazilian club with most international level official championships: 12 trophies
- The "CONMEBOL Treble": 1993 Copa Libertadores, 1993 Supercopa Libertadores and 1993 Recopa Sudamericana
- The "Quad Crown": 1993 Copa Libertadores, 1993 Supercopa Libertadores, 1993 Recopa Sudamericana and 1993 Intercontinental Cup
- The "Triple Crown":
  - 1992: 1992 Copa Libertadores, 1992 Intercontinental Cup, 1992 Campeonato Paulista
  - 2005: 2005 Campeonato Paulista, 2005 Copa Libertadores, 2005 FIFA Club World Cup
- The "Campeonato Brasileiro Three-peat":
  - 2006, 2007, 2008
- All-time Campeonato Brasileiro table (1959–2021): 1st place
- Ranking Placar (1971–2010): 1st place
- One of the two remain unrelegated clubs in Brazil (alongside Flamengo)

=== Awards ===
- Troféu do DEIP "O Clube Mais Querido da Cidade" : 1 – 1940
- Taça "O Esporte" – São Paulo 12–1 Jabaquara: 1 – 1945
- Taça dos Invictos: 6 – 1946, 1947, 1972, 1975, 2005, 2007
- Taça Newton Sá e Silva: 1 – 1950
- Troféu Fed. Venezuelana de Fútbol: 1 – 1955
- Troféu Colonia Portuguesa: 1 – 1955
- Troféu Ministro da Educação: 1 – 1955
- Troféu Instituto Nacional de Desportos 1 – 1955
- Taça AE Bradesco : 1 – 1957
- Trofeo La Nazione: 1 – 1964
- Troféu Esporte Moura: 1 – 1964
- Fita Azul: 1 – 1964
- Taça Independência do Brasil: 1 – 1971
- Taça Eficiência: 1 – 1972
- Taça A Maior Contagem da Rodada: 1 – 1973
- Taça Cidade de São Paulo – 1º Turno do Campeonato Paulista: 1 – 1975
- Taça 2º Turno do Campeonato Paulista: 1 – 1980
- Taça Governador do Estado de São Paulo: 5 – 1981, 1983, 1985, 2006, 2007
- Copa Jornal da Tarde: 2 – 1985, 1987
- Troféu Semana da Asa – Embraer: 1 – 1986
- Taça Diário Popular 105 Anos : 1 – 1989
- Campeonato Paulista - 1ª Fase: 1 – 1991
- Troféu Clube dos 13 : 1 – 1991
- Copa Dr. Nicolas Leoz: 1 – 1991
- Troféu Palácio dos Bandeirantes: 4 – 1991, 1992, 1998, 2000
- Taça Prefeitura de São Paulo: 1 – 1992
- Toyota Cup: 2 – 1992, 1993
- Japan Airlines Cup: 2 – 1993, 1994
- Trofeo Xacobeo: 1 – 1993
- II Troféu Top Marca: Equipe Mundial: 1 – 1994
- Troféu Futel: 1 – 1995
- Troféu Fair Play – Campeonato Paulista: 3 – 1995, 1998, 2000
- Taça Phillips do Brasil: 1 – 1999
- Taça TV Globo – 40 Anos: 1 – 2005
- Troféu Osmar Santos: 4 – 2006, 2007, 2018, 2020
- Troféu João Saldanha: 4 – 2006, 2007, 2008, 2012
- Taça Grupo de Empresários de São Paulo – GESP: 2 – 2006, 2007
- Taça Federação Brasiliense de Futebol: 1 – 2008
- Prêmio CONAFUT: 1 – 2021

=== Season records ===
Following are the main season records of São Paulo:

- Most matches played: 100 matches (44 wins, 32 draws, 24 loses) – 1978
- Fewest matches played: 5 matches (3 wins, 2 draws, 0 loses) – 1935
- Most matches won: 50 wins in 83 matches – 1982
- Most matches drawn: 38 draws in 80 matches – 1986
- Most matches defeats: 36 loses in 89 matches – 2016
- Most matches won in Campeonato Paulista: 28 wins – 1981
- Most matches won in Campeonato Brasileiro: 24 wins – 2007
- Most matches won in Copa Libertadores: 9 wins – 2005
- Fewest matches defeats: 0 loses – 1935
- Fewest matches defeats in Campeonato Paulista: 0 loses – 1946
- Fewest matches defeats in Campeonato Brasileiro: 2 loses – 2007
- Fewest matches defeats in Copa Libertadores: 1 lose – 2005
- Most goals scored: 203 goals – 1956
- Most goals conceded: 119 goals – 1994
- Most goals scored in Campeonato Paulista: 116 goals – 1956
- Most goals scored in Campeonato Brasileiro: 81 goals – 2003
- Most goals scored in Copa Libertadores: 34 goals – 2005
- Fewest goals conceded: 7 goals – 1935
- Fewest goals conceded in Campeonato Paulista: 7 goals – 1972
- Fewest goals conceded in Campeonato Brasileiro: 12 goals – 1981
- Fewest goals conceded in Copa Libertadores: 2 goals – 2019
- Best goals difference: 97 goals – 1956
- Best goals difference in Campeonato Paulista: 65 goals – 1956
- Best goals difference in Campeonato Brasileiro: 40 goals – 1986
- Best goals difference in Copa Libertadores: 20 goals – 2005

=== Streaks ===
Following are all the main streak sequences reached by São Paulo:

- Longest unbeaten run :
  - 47 matches: 13 November 1974 – 3 August 1975
- Longest unbeaten run at Estádio do Morumbi:
  - 31 matches: 20 July 1986 – 22 April 1987
- Longest unbeaten run at Estádio do Pacaembu:
  - 26 matches: 8 May 1943 – 1 April 1944
- Longest unbeaten run as home team and at Chácara da Floresta:
  - 35 matches: 16 March 1930 – 6 April 1932
- Longest unbeaten run as away team:
  - 24 matches: 3 November 1974 – 30 July 1975
- Longest unbeaten run in Campeonato Paulista:
  - 39 matches: 13 November 1974 – 3 August 1975
- Longest unbeaten run in Campeonato Brasileiro:
  - 18 matches: 20 August 2008 – 7 December 2008
- Longest unbeaten run in Copa Libertadores:
  - 11 matches: 30 March 1974 – 11 September 1974
- Longest unbeaten run in Copa Libertadores at the Estádio do Morumbi:
  - 30 matches: 4 June 1987 – 8 March 2006
- Longest winning streak:
  - 11 victories, 3 times (18 July 1943 – 19 September 1943), (28 October 1982 – 5 December 1982), (1 March 2012 – 12 April 2012)
- Longest winning streak at Estádio do Morumbi:
  - 12 victories: 12 March 2015 – 6 June 2015
- Longest winning streak at Estádio do Pacaembu:
  - 17 victories: 16 August 1953 – 13 June 1954
- Longest winning streak as home team and at Chácara da Floresta:
  - 17 victories: 21 May 1933 – 7 April 1934
- Longest winning streak in Campeonato Paulista:
  - 14 victories: 9 August 1953 – 15 November 1953
- Longest winning streak in Campeonato Brasileiro:
  - 10 victories: 5 October 2002 – 17 November 2002
- Longest scoring run:
  - 104 matches: 23 March 1930 – 29 October 1933
- Longest scoring run as home team:
  - 83 matches: 30 March 1930 – 25 January 1936
- Longest scoring run at Chácara da Floresta:
  - 81 matches: 30 March 1930 – 17 March 1935
- Longest scoring run at Estádio do Morumbi:
  - 39 matches: 19 September 1965 – 22 May 1968
- Longest scoring run as away team:
  - 43 matches: 23 March 1930 – 29 October 1933
- Longest scoring run in Campeonato Paulista:
  - 74 matches: 23 March 1930 – 22 October 1933
- Longest scoring run in Campeonato Brasileiro:
  - 38 matches: 22 September 2002 – 27 July 2003
- Longest scoring run in Copa Libertadores:
  - 23 matches: 16 June 2004 – 3 May 2006
- Longest streak without conceding a goal:
  - 7 matches: 23 January 1983 – 27 February 1983
- Longest streak without conceding a goal as home team:
  - 8 matches: 12 March 2015 – 6 May 2015
- Longest streak without conceding a goal as away team:
  - 8 matches: 19 January 1975 – 16 April 1975
- Longest streak without conceding a goal in Campeonato Paulsista:
  - 7 matches: 26 July 1984 – 25 August 1984
- Longest streak without conceding a goal in Campeonato Brasileiro:
  - 9 matches: 5 August 2007 – 8 September 2007
- Longest streak without conceding a goal in Copa Libertadores:
  - 8 matches: 14 April 1992 – 5 May 1993

=== Record wins ===
- Overall and Campeonato Paulista:
  - São Paulo 12–1 Sírio – 27 August 1933, Chácara da Floresta
  - São Paulo 12–1 Jabaquara – 8 July 1945, Estádio do Pacaembu
  - São Paulo 11–0 SC Internacional – 3 July 1932, Chácara da Floresta
- Copa do Brasil:
  - São Paulo 10–0 Botafogo (PB) – 28 March 2001, Estádio do Morumbi
- Campeonato Brasileiro:
  - São Paulo 7–0 Paysandu – 28 September 2004, Estádio do Morumbi
- Copa Libertadores:
  - São Paulo 6–0 Trujillanos – 5 April 2016, Estádio do Morumbi
- Final match:
  - São Paulo 6–1 Peñarol – 14 December 1994, Estádio do Morumbi, 1994 Copa CONMEBOL Finals first leg
- As the away team:
  - Operário de Ourinhos 0–10 São Paulo – 14 November 1943, Ourinhos
- Against a foreign team:
  - São Paulo 8–0 Mitsubishi – 1 February 1970, Estádio do Morumbi
- Against a European team:
  - São Paulo 6–0 Malmö FF – 4 December 1949, Estádio do Pacaembu
- Against a national team:
  - São Paulo 6–2 Brazil – 17 February 1962, Estádio do Pacaembu
  - São Paulo 5–1 Saudi Arabia – 22 September 1981, Estádio do Morumbi
  - India 0–4 São Paulo – 8 January 1989, Jawaharlal Nehru Stadium, New Delhi, India

=== Record defeats ===
- Overall:
  - Botafogo 8–1 São Paulo – 10 July 1940, Estádio das Laranjeiras, Torneio Rio-São Paulo
- Campeonato Paulista:
  - São Paulo 0–5 Portuguesa – 2 April 1939, Estádio Antarctica Paulista
  - Corinthians 5–0 São Paulo – 10 March 1996, Estádio Santa Cruz
- Campeonato Brasileiro:
  - Vasco da Gama 7–1 São Paulo – 25 November 2001, Estádio São Januário
- At Estádio do Morumbi:
  - São Paulo 1–5 Internacional – 20 January 2021, 2020 Campeonato Brasileiro Série A
- Against a foreign team:
  - Peñarol 5–0 São Paulo – 24 December 1944, Centenario, Montevideo, Uruguay
- Against a national team:
  - Bulgaria 4–1 São Paulo – 12 August 1969, Stadion Balgarska Armia, Sofia, Bulgaria

=== Matches ===
- First match: São Paulo 3–0 Ypiranga, 9 March 1930, Chácara da Floresta, Torneio Inicio Paulista
- First official and Campeonato Paulista match: São Paulo 0–0 Ypiranga, 16 March 1930, Chácara da Floresta, 1930 Campeonato Paulista
- First match against a national team: São Paulo 5–3 United States, 10 August 1930, Chácara da Floresta, Friendly
- First match against a foreign and South American club: São Paulo 2–1 River Plate, 14 February 1935, Chácara da Floresta, Friendly
- Last match at Chácara da Floresta: São Paulo 1–1 São Cristóvão, 17 March 1935, Friendly
- First match at Estádio do Pacaembu: São Paulo 5–6 America (RJ), 11 May 1940, Friendly
- First match played outside Brazil: Nacional 3–1 São Paulo, 20 December 1944, Centenario, Montevideo, Uruguay
- First match against a European club: São Paulo 4–2 Southampton, 25 May 1948, Pacaembu, Friendly
- First match played outside South America and first match played in Europe: Belenenses 2–4 São Paulo, 6 May 1951, Campo das Salésias, Lisbon, Portugal
- First match played in Central and North America: América 0–0 São Paulo, 29 May 1955, Estadio Ciudad de los Deportes, Mexico City, Mexico
- First match at Estádio do Morumbi: São Paulo 1–0 Sporting CP, 2 October 1960, Friendly
- First Torneio Roberto Gomes Pedrosa match: Bangu 2–1 São Paulo, 12 March 1967, Maracanã, 1967 Torneio Roberto Gomes Pedrosa
- First match played against an African club: Wydad Casablanca 0–3 São Paulo, 31 August 1969, Stade Mohammed V, Casablanca, Morocco
- First Campeonato Brasileiro match: São Paulo 0–3 Grêmio, 7 August 1971, Morumbi, 1971 Campeonato Brasileiro Série A
- First Copa Libertadores match: Atlético Mineiro 2–2 São Paulo, 25 January 1972, Mineirão, 1972 Copa Libertadores
- First match played in Asia: Saudi Arabia 1–1 São Paulo, 13 December 1979, Prince Faisal bin Fahd Stadium, Riyadh, Saudi Arabia
- First Copa Sudamericana match: Grêmio 0–4 São Paulo, 30 July 2003, Estádio Olímpico Monumental, 2003 Copa Sudamericana

=== Canceled matches ===
- Albion 1–0 São Paulo – 24 May 1936, 1936 Campeonato Paulista: Albion withdrew from the league and all matches involving the club were canceled
- Ponte Preta 1–0 São Paulo – 16 July 2005, 2005 Campeonato Brasileiro Série A, due to 2005 Brazilian football match-fixing scandal
- São Paulo 3–2 Corinthians – 7 September 2005, 2005 Campeonato Brasileiro Série A, due to 2005 Brazilian football match-fixing scandal

=== Attendances ===
The biggest attendances of the club were obtained before the reformulations of Estádio do Morumbi occurred over the years, which today currently holds 66,795 spectators. Changes in Brazilian legislation and safety standards also make it impossible for the stadium's maximum capacity to be reached in games with the away team's supporters. Following is the list:

- Biggest attendance: 122,209 – São Paulo 1–0 Santos, 16 November 1980, 1980 Campeonato Paulista Finals
- Biggest attendance in Campeonato Brasileiro: 103,092 – São Paulo 3–0 Operário (MS), 26 February 1978, 1977 Campeonato Brasileiro Série A
- Biggest attendance in Copa Libertadores: 105,185 – São Paulo 1–0 Newell's Old Boys, 17 June 1992, 1992 Copa Libertadores Finals
- Best total attendance (season): 1,515,715 – 33 matches, 2023
- Best attendance average (season): 45,390 – 2023
- Best attendance average in Campeonato Paulista: 46,895 – 2024
- Best attendance average in Campeonato Brasileiro: 46,600 – 2023
- Best attendance average in Copa Libertadores: 68,725 – 1993

== Transfers ==
=== Highest transfer fees paid ===
Rank	Player	From	Transfer fee (R$)	Transfer fee (other)	Date	Ref.
1	(Argentina) Giuliano Galoppo	(Argentina) Banfield	R$32.6 million	US$6 million	26 July 2022	
2	(Brazil) Pablo	(Brazil) Athletico Paranaense	R$26.6 million	—	19 December 2018	
3	(Brazil) Tchê Tchê	(Ukraine) Dinamo Kyiv	R$25 million	€5 million	1 April 2019	
4	(Brazil) Paulo Henrique Ganso	(Brazil) Santos	R$23.9 million	—	21 September 2012	
5	(Venezuela) Nahuel Ferraresi	(England) Manchester City	R$23.0 million	€4,3 million	5 January 2024	
6	(Argentina) Emiliano Rigoni	(Russia) Zenit Saint Petersburg	R$22.6 million	€3 million	24 May 2021	
7	(Brazil) Maicon Roque	(Portugal) Porto	R$22 million	€6.6 million	29 June 2016	
8	(Brazil) Tiago Volpi	(Mexico) Querétaro	R$21 million	US$5 million	24 December 2019	
9	(Argentina) Lucas Pratto	(Brazil) Atlético Mineiro	R$20.7 million	€6.2 million	10 February 2017	
10	(Brazil) André Silva	(Portugal) Vitória de Guimarães	R$18.9 million	€3.5 million	29 February 2024	

=== Highest transfer fees received ===
Rank	Player	To	Transfer fee (R$)	Transfer fee (other)	Date	Ref.
1	(Brazil) Lucas Moura	(France) Paris Saint-Germain	R$108.3 million	€45 million	8 August 2012	
2	(Brazil) Antony	(Netherlands) Ajax	R$103 million	€29 million	15 February 2020	
3	(Brazil) Brenner	(United States) FC Cincinnati	R$80.7 million	US$13 million	4 February 2021	
4	(Brazil) Lucas Beraldo	(France) Paris Saint-Germain	R$64.2 million	€20 million	1 January 2024	
5	(Brazil) Gabriel Sara	(England) Norwich City	R$57.6 million	£9 million	15 July 2022	
6	(Brazil) William Gomes	(Portugal) Porto	R$55.6 million	€9 million	27 January 2025	
7	(Brazil) David Neres	(Netherlands) Ajax	R$50.7 million	€15 million	30 January 2017	
8	(Brazil) Lucas Ferreira	(Ukraine) Shakhtar	R$50.0 million	€8 million	16 August 2025	
9	(Brazil) Diego Costa	(Russia) FC Krasnodar	R$44.7 million	€7.5 million	16 July 2024	
10	(Argentina) Lucas Pratto	(Argentina) River Plate	R$44.4 million	€13.5 million	8 January 2018	

Note
Considering absolute values in Brazilian real. In August 1997, Denílson was traded to Real Betis for R$31 million, a time when the Brazilian currency was pegged to U.S. dollar.

== Presidents ==
Following is the list with all presidents of São Paulo FC:

- Edgard de Sousa Aranha (1930–1934)
- João Baptista da Cunha Bueno (1934–1935)
- Luís Oliveira de Barros (1935)
- Manuel do Carmo Mecca (1935–1936)
- Frederico Germano Menzen (1936–1937)
- Cid Matos Vianna (1937–1938)
- Piragibe Nogueira (1938–1940)
- Paulo Machado de Carvalho (1940)
- João Tomás Monteiro da Silva (1940–1941)
- Décio Pacheco Pedroso (1941–1946)
- Roberto Gomes Pedrosa (1946)
- Paulo Machado de Carvalho (1946–1947)
- Cícero Pompeu de Toledo (1947–1958)
- Laudo Natel (1958–1971)
- Henri Couri Aidar (1971–1978)
- Antônio Leme Nunes Galvão (1978–1982)
- José Douglas Dallora (1982–1984)
- Carlos Miguel Aidar (1984–1988)
- Juvenal Juvêncio (1988–1990)
- José Eduardo Mesquita Pimenta (1990–1994)
- Fernando José Casal de Rey (1994–1998)
- José Augusto Bastos Neto (1998–2000)
- Paulo Amaral (2000–2002)
- Marcelo Portugal Gouvêa (2002–2006)
- Juvenal Juvêncio (2006–2014)
- Carlos Miguel Aidar (2014–2015)
- Carlos Augusto de Barros e Silva (2015–2020)
- Julio Casares (2021–2026)
- Harry Massis Jr. (2026)

== Head-to-head record ==
As of 2021 season

- Record against Brazilian clubs with at least 20 matches played:

Club	Local	M	W	D	L	GF	GA	GD	Win%
Corinthians (m)	(São Paulo (state)) SP	350	107	112	131	471	499	−28	30.57
Palmeiras (c)	(São Paulo (state)) SP	332	112	110	110	433	434	−1	33.73
Santos (s)	(São Paulo (state)) SP	316	135	75	106	522	452	+70	42.72
Portuguesa	(São Paulo (state)) SP	246	119	64	63	416	279	+137	48.37
Guarani	(São Paulo (state)) SP	178	85	53	40	306	205	+101	47.75
Ponte Preta	(São Paulo (state)) SP	145	75	43	27	252	140	+112	51.72
Juventus	(São Paulo (state)) SP	142	90	27	25	319	137	+182	63.38
Flamengo	(Rio de Janeiro (state)) RJ	139	56	40	43	231	186	+45	40.29
Fluminense	(Rio de Janeiro (state)) RJ	127	55	26	46	201	191	+10	43.31
Vasco da Gama	(Rio de Janeiro (state)) RJ	124	45	36	43	198	172	+26	36.29
Botafogo	(Rio de Janeiro (state)) RJ	109	46	24	39	196	167	+29	42.20
Botafogo	(São Paulo (state)) SP	104	55	31	18	171	96	+75	52.88
Atlético Mineiro	(Minas Gerais) MG	103	36	32	35	142	125	+17	34.95
Grêmio	(Rio Grande do Sul) RS	103	39	30	34	127	113	+14	37.86
Portuguesa Santista	(São Paulo (state)) SP	92	68	14	10	275	113	+162	73.91
XV de Piracicaba	(São Paulo (state)) SP	89	49	23	17	183	91	+92	55.06
Cruzeiro	(Minas Gerais) MG	86	42	22	22	118	83	+35	48.84
Internacional	(Rio Grande do Sul) RS	83	30	26	27	101	93	+8	36.14
Ferroviária	(São Paulo (state)) SP	78	39	21	18	127	79	+48	50.00
América	(São Paulo (state)) SP	69	42	13	14	119	55	+64	60.87
Noroeste	(São Paulo (state)) SP	69	42	20	7	162	63	+99	60.87
Athletico Paranaense	(Paraná (state)) PR	68	24	24	20	89	76	+13	35.29
São Bento	(São Paulo (state)) SP	68	44	16	8	103	38	+65	64.71
Ypiranga	(São Paulo (state)) SP	60	44	5	11	167	69	+98	73.33
Sport Recife	(Pernambuco) PE	57	34	13	10	99	45	+54	59.65
Coritiba	(Paraná (state)) PR	55	23	16	16	83	69	+14	41.82
Bahia	(Bahia) BA	54	19	16	19	58	57	+1	35.19
Jabaquara	(São Paulo (state)) SP	54	45	2	7	168	62	+106	83.33
Comercial (RP)	(São Paulo (state)) SP	53	27	12	14	101	68	+33	50.94
Goiás	(Goiás) GO	52	24	13	15	70	55	+15	46.15
Red Bull Bragantino	(São Paulo (state)) SP	51	26	12	13	80	52	+28	50.98
Inter de Limeira	(São Paulo (state)) SP	50	26	16	8	78	39	+39	52.00
Nacional	(São Paulo (state)) SP	49	37	8	4	139	50	+89	75.51
Vitória	(Bahia) BA	49	30	9	10	95	53	+42	61.22
XV de Jaú	(São Paulo (state)) SP	48	32	8	8	91	35	+56	66.67
America	(Rio de Janeiro (state)) RJ	47	20	17	10	86	66	+20	42.55
Santo André	(São Paulo (state)) SP	41	22	10	9	68	35	+33	53.66
Comercial (SP)	(São Paulo (state)) SP	37	29	5	3	123	36	+87	78.38
Taubaté	(São Paulo (state)) SP	37	22	7	8	77	39	+38	59.46
Marília	(São Paulo (state)) SP	35	25	6	4	75	29	+46	71.43
Paulista de Jundiaí	(São Paulo (state)) SP	35	20	11	4	68	30	+38	57.14
Figueirense	(Santa Catarina (state)) SC	34	19	10	5	58	31	+27	55.88
São Caetano	(São Paulo (state)) SP	32	13	10	9	41	35	+6	40.63
Ituano	(São Paulo (state)) SP	30	19	6	5	56	29	+27	63.33
Santa Cruz	(Pernambuco) PE	29	22	5	2	59	20	+39	75.86
Ceará	(Ceará) CE	27	14	9	4	51	27	+24	51.85
Mogi Mirim	(São Paulo (state)) SP	27	13	8	6	49	24	+25	48.15
Náutico	(Pernambuco) PE	27	14	7	6	50	26	+24	51.85
Rio Branco	(São Paulo (state)) SP	25	17	3	5	55	25	+30	68.00
São José	(São Paulo (state)) SP	25	13	10	2	45	17	+28	52.00
Fortaleza	(Ceará) CE	24	12	7	5	36	23	+13	50.00
Francana	(São Paulo (state)) SP	23	11	9	3	43	27	+16	47.83
Juventude	(Rio Grande do Sul) RS	23	10	7	6	44	30	+14	43.48
Linense	(São Paulo (state)) SP	21	13	3	5	55	24	+31	61.90
União São João	(São Paulo (state)) SP	21	12	6	3	41	21	+20	57.14
América	(Minas Gerais) MG	20	11	7	2	36	16	+20	55.00
Criciúma	(Santa Catarina (state)) SC	20	9	5	6	26	20	+6	45.00
Paraná	(Paraná (state)) PR	20	11	7	2	44	24	+20	55.00

- Record against American clubs (at least 10 matches):

Club	Local	M	W	D	L	GF	GA	GD	Win%
Boca Juniors	ARG	20	7	5	8	29	29	+0	35.00
Atlético Nacional	COL	16	8	4	4	23	13	+10	50.00
River Plate	ARG	16	5	6	5	24	23	+1	31.25
Olimpia	PAR	15	8	1	6	26	13	+13	53.33
Colo-Colo	CHI	14	6	3	5	25	21	+4	42.86
Peñarol	URU	12	6	2	4	23	17	+6	50.00
Chivas Guadalajara	MEX	10	5	3	2	22	8	+14	50.00
Nacional	URU	10	6	2	2	16	8	+8	60.00

- Record against European clubs (at least 3 matches):

Club	Local	M	W	D	L	GF	GA	GD	Win%
Real Madrid	ESP	6	4	2	0	12	3	+9	66.67
Barcelona	ESP	4	2	0	2	6	5	+1	50.00
Benfica	POR	4	3	1	0	9	4	+5	75.00
Milan	ITA	4	3	0	1	6	4	+2	75.00
Valencia	ESP	4	1	1	2	3	6	−3	25.00
Porto	POR	3	2	1	0	5	2	+3	66.67
Sevilla	ESP	3	2	1	0	5	2	+3	66.67
Sporting	POR	3	3	0	0	7	2	+5	100.00

- Record against national teams:

Team	M	W	D	L	GF	GA	GD	Win%
Saudi Arabia	4	1	3	0	9	5	+4	25.00
India	2	1	1	0	6	2	+4	50.00
Soviet Union	2	1	1	0	2	1	+1	50.00
United States	2	2	0	0	7	4	+3	100.00
Brazil	1	1	0	0	6	2	+4	100.00
Bulgaria	1	0	0	1	1	4	−3	0.00
China	1	1	0	0	2	1	+1	100.00
Colombia	1	0	0	1	0	1	−1	0.00
Denmark (U21)	1	0	1	0	1	1	+0	0.00
Ghana	1	1	0	0	4	2	+2	100.00
Hungary	1	0	1	0	2	2	+0	0.00
Jamaica	1	1	0	0	2	0	+2	100.00
Mexico	1	1	0	0	3	0	+3	100.00
Uruguay	1	1	0	0	1	0	+1	100.00

== Notes ==
1. The matches of Torneio Rio-São Paulo 1933 and 1940 against teams from São Paulo state were also valid for the Campeonato Paulista of same year.
2. The 1934 Torneio-Rio São Pauo edition was not finished. After this, São Paulo claimed to APEA (Associação Paulista de Esportes Atléticos) the title of the qualifying phase, later called "Torneio dos Cinco Clubes".
3. In 1951, São Paulo alongside Bangu due a tour for Europe. The matches played by the combined São Paulo / Bangu are not considered in the club's statistics. After the end of the tour, São Paulo remained in Europe for one last match, against Belenenses.
4. During this same 1951 tour, the famous sports radialist Geraldo José de Almeida created an April Fools' Day prank narrating an AC Milan goalie over São Paulo by 8–1. The game evidently never took place.
5. For disagreeing with the regulation and qualification criteria, Corinthians, Portuguesa, Santos and São Paulo withdrew from 1979 Campeonato Brasileiro Série A edition. None of the clubs were relegated.
