= 1939 São Paulo FC season =

São Paulo
1939 season
- Chairman: Piragibe Nogueira
- Manager: Vicente Feola; Ignác Amsel; Décio Pedroso; Armando Gomes; Amílcar Barbuy
- Campeonato Paulista: 5th

The 1939 football season was São Paulo's 10th season since the club's founding in 1930.

== Overall ==
Games played	36 (20 Campeonato Paulista, 16 Friendly match)
Games won	20 (10 Campeonato Paulista, 10 Friendly match)
Games drawn	3 (1 Campeonato Paulista, 2 Friendly match)
Games lost	13 (9 Campeonato Paulista, 4 Friendly match)
Goals scored	73
Goals conceded	44
Goal difference	+29
Best result	8–1 (H) v Portuguesa Santista - Campeonato Paulista - 1939.11.12
Worst result	0–3 (A) v Corinthians - Friendly match - 1939.12.03
Most appearances	
Top scorer	

Source: São Paulo FC

== Friendlies ==
January 18 National	São Paulo	3–0	Palestra Itália-PR	São Paulo
	Goal			Stadium: Estádio Palestra Itália (Parque Antarctica)

February 5 National	São Paulo	2–0	Portuguesa	São Paulo
	Goal			Stadium: Estádio Antônio Alonso (Antarctica Paulista)

February 11 National	São Paulo	1–0	Portuguesa Santista	São Paulo
	Goal			Stadium: Estádio Palestra Itália (Parque Antarctica)

February 26 National	São Paulo	2–2	Portuguesa	São Paulo
	Goal		Goal	Stadium: Campo do Cambuci

March 5 National	São Paulo	6–2	Ypiranga	São Paulo
	Goal		Goal	Stadium: Estádio Antônio Alonso (Antarctica Paulista)

March 12 National	São Paulo	0–0	Juventus	São Paulo
				Stadium: Estádio Antônio Alonso (Antarctica Paulista)

March 19 National	Flamengo	1–4	São Paulo	Rio de Janeiro
	Goal		Goal	Stadium: Estádio José Bastos Padilha (da Gávea)

April 13 National	São Paulo	5–1	Fluminense	São Paulo
	Goal		Goal	Stadium: Estádio Palestra Itália (Parque Antarctica)

May 1 National	XV de Piracicaba	1–2	São Paulo	Piracicaba
	Goal		Goal	Stadium: Campo da Rua Regente Feijó

June 11 National	Rui Barbosa	1–2	São Paulo	São Carlos
	Goal		Goal	Stadium: Campo da Vila Néri

July 23 Taça Mesbla	Uberaba	0–3	São Paulo	Uberaba
			Goal	Stadium: Estádio Boulanger Pucci

August 17 National	São Paulo	0–2	Fluminense	São Paulo
			Goal	Stadium: Estádio Palestra Itália (Parque Antarctica)

October 7 National	São Paulo	0–1	Portuguesa	São Paulo
			Goal	Stadium: Campo do Cambuci

October 8 National	Sanjoanense	1–0	São Paulo	São João da Boa Vista
	Goal

December 3 National	Corinthians	3–0	São Paulo	São Paulo
	Goal			Stadium: Estádio Alfredo Schürig (Parque São Jorge)

December 17 National	Agudos	1–2	São Paulo	Agudos
	Goal		Goal	Stadium: Campo da Rua José Salmon

== Official competitions ==
=== Campeonato Paulista ===
May 28 Round 1	São Paulo	4–3	Ypiranga	São Paulo
	Goal		Goal	Stadium: Estádio Antônio Alonso (Antarctica Paulista)

June 4 Round 2	Portuguesa	3–1	São Paulo	São Paulo
	Goal		Goal	Stadium: Rua Cesário Ramalho

June 18 Round 3	Juventus	2–1	São Paulo	São Paulo
	Goal		Goal	Stadium: Estádio Conde Rodolfo Crespi (Rua Javari)

July 2 Round 4	Palestra Itália	2–1	São Paulo	São Paulo
	Goal		Goal	Stadium: Estádio Palestra Itália (Parque Antarctica)

July 9 Round 5	São Paulo	0–1	Santos	São Paulo
			Goal	Stadium: Estádio Antônio Alonso (Antarctica Paulista)

July 16 Round 6	São Paulo	2–1	Corinthians	São Paulo
	Goal		Goal	Stadium: Estádio Antônio Alonso (Antarctica Paulista)

July 30 Round 7	Portuguesa Santista	0–1	São Paulo	Santos
			Goal	Stadium: Estádio Ulrico Mursa

August 6 Round 8	São Paulo	1–2	Espanha	São Paulo
	Goal		Goal	Stadium: Estádio Antônio Alonso (Antarctica Paulista)

August 13 Round 9	São Paulo Railway	3–1	São Paulo	São Paulo
	Goal		Goal	Stadium: Rua Comendador Sousa

August 27 Round 10	São Paulo	3–1	Comercial	São Paulo
	Goal		Goal	Stadium: Estádio Antônio Alonso (Antarctica Paulista)

September 10 Round 11	Ypiranga	1–1	São Paulo	São Paulo
	Goal		Goal	Stadium: Rua dos Ituanos

September 16 Round 12	São Paulo	0–1	Portuguesa	São Paulo
			Goal	Stadium: Estádio Antônio Alonso (Antarctica Paulista)

October 1 Round 13	São Paulo	3–1	Juventus	São Paulo
	Goal		Goal	Stadium: Estádio Antônio Alonso (Antarctica Paulista)

October 15 Round 14	Palestra Itália	1–2	São Paulo	São Paulo
	Goal		Goal	Stadium: Estádio Palestra Itália (Parque Antarctica)

October 22 Round 15	Santos	2–3	São Paulo	Santos
	Goal		Goal	Stadium: Estádio Urbano Caldeira (Vila Belmiro)

October 29 Round 16	Corinthians	1–0	São Paulo	São Paulo
	Goal			Stadium: Estádio Alfredo Schürig (Parque São Jorge)

November 12 Round 17	São Paulo	8–1	Portuguesa Santista	São Paulo
	Goal		Goal	Stadium: Estádio Antônio Alonso (Antarctica Paulista)

November 18 Round 18	São Paulo	5–0	Espanha	São Paulo
	Goal			Stadium: Estádio Antônio Alonso (Antarctica Paulista)

December 31 Round 19	São Paulo	4–1	São Paulo Railway	São Paulo
	Goal		Goal	Stadium: Estádio Antônio Alonso (Antarctica Paulista)

January 14, 1940 Round 20	São Paulo	0–1	Comercial	São Paulo
			Goal	Stadium: Estádio Antônio Alonso (Antarctica Paulista)

==== Record ====
Final Position	Points	Matches	Wins	Draws	Losses	Goals For	Goals Away	Win%
5th	21	20	10	1	9	41	28	52%
