= 1933 São Paulo FC season =

São Paulo
1933 season
- Chairman: Edgard de Souza Aranha
- Manager: Rubens Sales
- Campeonato Paulista: Runners-up
- Torneio Rio-São Paulo: Runners-up

The 1933 football season was São Paulo's 4th season since the club's founding in 1930.

== Overall ==
Games played	31 (14 Campeonato Paulista #, 23 Torneio Rio-São Paulo #, 6 Friendly match)
Games won	21 (11 Campeonato Paulista #, 16 Torneio Rio-São Paulo #, 3 Friendly match)
Games drawn	5 (1 Campeonato Paulista #, 3 Torneio Rio-São Paulo #, 2 Friendly match)
Games lost	4 (2 Campeonato Paulista #, 4 Torneio Rio-São Paulo #, 0 Friendly match)
Goals scored	109
Goals conceded	43
Goal difference	+66
Best result	12–1 (H) v Sírio - Campeonato Paulista - 1933.8.27
Worst result	1–3 (A) v Vasco da Gama - Torneio Rio-São Paulo - 1933.9.3
Top scorer	

Source: São Paulo FC

- # 12 Matches valids simultaneously for the Campeonato Paulista and Torneio Rio-São Paulo.

== Friendlies ==
January 15, 1933 National	Esportiva (São José)	0–4	São Paulo	São José dos Campos

March 12, 1933 National	Santos	1–5	São Paulo	Santos
				Stadium: Vila Belmiro

April 2, 1933 National	São Paulo	4–2	Corinthians	São Paulo
				Stadium: Chácara da Floresta

April 16, 1933 National	São Paulo	1–1	Palestra Itália	São Paulo
				Stadium: Parque São Jorge

April 30, 1933 National	America-RJ	2–2	São Paulo	Rio de Janeiro

July 1, 1933 National	São Paulo	7–3	Flamengo	São Paulo
				Stadium: Chácara da Floresta

August 8, 1933 National	Flamengo	1–1	São Paulo	Rio de Janeiro
				Stadium: Laranjeiras

October 29, 1933 National	Sãomanoelense	2–5	São Paulo	São Manuel

November 19, 1933 National	Guarani	0–2	São Paulo	Campinas

== Official competitions ==
=== Campeonato Paulista ===
May 14, 1933 1#	São Paulo	2–3	Palestra Itália	São Paulo
				Stadium: Chácara da Floresta

May 21, 1933 2#	São Paulo	7–1	Ypiranga	São Paulo
				Stadium: Chácara da Floresta

May 28, 1933 3#	São Paulo	5–0	A.A. São Bento	São Paulo
				Stadium: Chácara da Floresta

June 11, 1933 4#	Portuguesa	2–2	São Paulo	São Paulo
				Stadium: Rua Cesário Ramalho

June 29, 1933 5	São Paulo	7–1	Sírio	São Paulo
				Stadium: Chácara da Floresta

July 9, 1933 6#	São Paulo	4–1	Santos	São Paulo
				Stadium: Chácara da Floresta

July 23, 1933 7#	Corinthians	2–4	São Paulo	São Paulo
				Stadium: Parque São Jorge

August 27, 1933 8	São Paulo	12–1	Sírio	São Paulo
				Stadium: Chácara da Floresta

September 10, 1933 9#	São Paulo	6–1	Corinthians	São Paulo
				Stadium: Chácara da Floresta

September 24, 1933 10#	São Paulo	2–0	Portuguesa	São Paulo
				Stadium: Chácara da Floresta

October 1, 1933 11#	A.A. São Bento	0–1	São Paulo	São Paulo
				Stadium: Ponte Grande

October 22, 1933 12#	Santos	2–6	São Paulo	Santos
				Stadium: Vila Belmiro

November 12, 1933 13#	Palestra Itália	1–0	São Paulo	São Paulo
				Stadium: Parque Antarctica

November 15, 1933 14#	São Paulo	4–1	Ypiranga	São Paulo
				Stadium: Chácara da Floresta

- # Match valid simultaneously for the Campeonato Paulista and Torneio Rio-São Paulo.

==== Record ====
Final Position	Points	Matches	Wins	Draws	Losses	Goals For	Goals Away	Win%
2nd	23	14	11	1	2	62	16	82%

=== Torneio Rio-São Paulo ===
May 14, 1933 1#	São Paulo	2–3	Palestra Itália	São Paulo
				Stadium: Chácara da Floresta

May 21, 1933 2#	São Paulo	7–1	Ypiranga	São Paulo
				Stadium: Chácara da Floresta

May 28, 1933 3#	São Paulo	5–0	A.A. São Bento	São Paulo
				Stadium: Chácara da Floresta

June 4, 1933 4	São Paulo	5–1	Vasco da Gama	São Paulo
				Stadium: Chácara da Floresta

June 11, 1933 5#	Portuguesa	2–2	São Paulo	São Paulo
				Stadium: Rua Cesário Ramalho

June 18, 1933 6	Bonsucesso	5–4	São Paulo	Rio de Janeiro
				Stadium: Laranjeiras

July 9, 1933 7#	São Paulo	4–1	Santos	São Paulo
				Stadium: Chácara da Floresta

July 16, 1933 8	São Paulo	7–4	America-RJ	São Paulo
				Stadium: Chácara da Floresta

July 23, 1933 9#	Corinthians	2–4	São Paulo	São Paulo
				Stadium: Parque São Jorge

August 5, 1933 10	Bangu	0–1	São Paulo	Rio de Janeiro
				Stadium: Laranjeiras

August 20, 1933 11	São Paulo	3–0	Fluminense	São Paulo
				Stadium: Chácara da Floresta

September 3, 1933 12	Vasco da Gama	3–1	São Paulo	Rio de Janeiro
				Stadium: São Januário

September 10, 1933 13#	São Paulo	6–1	Corinthians	São Paulo
				Stadium: Chácara da Floresta

September 24, 1933 14#	São Paulo	2–0	Portuguesa	São Paulo
				Stadium: Chácara da Floresta

October 1, 1933 15#	A.A. São Bento	0–1	São Paulo	São Paulo
				Stadium: Ponte Grande

October 8, 1933 16	São Paulo	1–0	Bonsucesso	São Paulo
				Stadium: Chácara da Floresta

October 15, 1933 17	America-RJ	1–1	São Paulo	Rio de Janeiro
				Stadium: Estádio da Rua Campos Sales

October 22, 1933 18#	Santos	2–6	São Paulo	Santos
				Stadium: Vila Belmiro

November 12, 1933 19#	Palestra Itália	1–0	São Paulo	São Paulo
				Stadium: Parque Antarctica

November 15, 1933 20#	São Paulo	4–1	Ypiranga	São Paulo
				Stadium: Chácara da Floresta

November 26, 1933 21	São Paulo	4–1	Bangu	São Paulo
				Stadium: Chácara da Floresta

December 3, 1933 22	Fluminense	2–5	São Paulo	Rio de Janeiro
				Stadium: Laranjeiras

- # Match valid simultaneously for the Campeonato Paulista and Torneio Rio-São Paulo.

==== Record ====
Final Position	Points	Matches	Wins	Draws	Losses	Goals For	Goals Away	Win%
2nd	34	22	16	2	4	75	31	77%
