= 1935 São Paulo FC season =

São Paulo
1935 season
- Chairman: Edgard Egydio de Souza Aranha (until 7 March); Luís Oliveira de Barros
- Manager: Clodô
- Top goalscorer: League: All: Luizinho (5)

The 1935 football season was São Paulo's 6th season since the club's founding in 1930.

== Statistics ==
=== Scorers ===
Position	Nation	Playing position	Name	Others	Total
1	(Brazil)	FW	Luizinho	5	5
2	(Brazil)	MF	Araken Patusca	2	2
=	(Brazil)	FW	Friedenreich	1	1
3	(Brazil)		Junqueirinha	1	1
=	(Brazil)		Vega	1	1
			Total	10	10

== Overall ==
Games played	6 (Friendly match)
Games won	4 (Friendly match)
Games drawn	2 (Friendly match)
Games lost	0 (Friendly match)
Goals scored	14
Goals conceded	7
Goal difference	+7
Best result	4–1 (A) v Portuguesa - Friendly match
Worst result	
Most appearances	
Top scorer	Luizinho (5)

Source: São Paulo FC

== Friendlies ==
January 6 National	São Paulo	4–1	Portuguesa	São Paulo
				Stadium: Chácara da Floresta

February 3 National	Santos	1–2	São Paulo	Santos
16:15	Mario Seixas 20'	Report	Luizinho 28', 60'	Stadium: Estádio Urbano Caldeira (Vila Belmiro)

February 14 International	São Paulo (Brazil)	2–1	(Argentina) River Plate	São Paulo
21:00	Junqueirinha 3'; Luizinho	Report	Telio	Stadium: Chácara da Floresta; Referee: Miguel Urretavizcaya (Argentina)

March 10 National	Palestra Itália	2–2	São Paulo	São Paulo
16:00	Gabardo 30'; Mendes 35'	Report	Luizinho 38', 65'	Stadium: Estádio Palestra Itália (Parque Antarctica); Referee: Manuel Nunes "Néco"

March 17 National	São Paulo	1–1	São Cristóvão	São Paulo
16:00	Araken Patusca	Report	???

March 24 National	Corinthians	1–3	São Paulo	São Paulo
16:00	Alberto	Report	Araken Patusca; Friedenreich; Vega	Stadium: Estádio Alfredo Schürig (Parque São Jorge); Referee: Thomaz de Almeida
