= Fernando Carazo =

Spanish footballer

Personal information
- Full name: Fernando Carazo Castro
- Date of birth: 6 April 1904
- Place of birth: A Coruña, Spain
- Date of death: 18 July 1986 (aged 82)
- Place of death: Belo Horizonte, Brazil
- Position: Midfielder

Senior career*
Years	Team	Apps	(Gls)
- Wandekok
1925	EC Itapira		
1926–1927	Antarctica FC		
1927	Palestra Itália-SP	1	(0)
1928–1932	Palestra Itália-MG		
1932	Villa Nova		
1933–1935	Palestra Itália-SP		
1936	São Paulo	2	(2)
1936–1941	Palestra Itália-MG		
1943	Metalusina EC		
- * Club domestic league appearances and goals as of 7 November 2025

Fernando Carazo Castro (6 April 1904 – 18 July 1986), was a Spanish professional footballer who played as midfielder.

== Career ==
Born in A Coruña, Spain, Carazo arrived in Brazil with his family in 1907. During the 1920s he began playing football, starting with the amateur team Wandekok and later with EC Itapira and Antarctica FC. In 1927 he joined the second team of SS Palestra Italia (now SE Palmeiras), playing in one of the team's state championship matches. At the end of 1927, he was spotted by directors of Palestra Italia FC, now Cruzeiro EC, and taken to Belo Horizonte. With the team, Carazo became the club's most prominent foreign player to date, making 113 appearances, scoring 44 goals, and winning the championship in 1928, 1929, and 1930. In 1932 he transferred to Villa Nova and won another championship.

He returned to Palestra Italia-SP in 1933 and 1934, participating in the campaigns for the state and Rio-São Paulo titles. In 1936 he transferred to São Paulo FC where he played only twice, returning to Palestra Italia-MG. He ended his career in 1943 with Metalusina EC, from Barão de Cocais. Upon retiring, he began working as a carpenter.

== Honours ==
Cruzeiro

- Campeonato Mineiro: 1928, 1929, 1930, 1940

Villa Nova

- Campeonato Mineiro: 1932 (AMEG)

Palmeiras

- Campeonato Paulista: 1927 (APEA), 1933, 1934
- Torneio Rio-São Paulo: 1933
