= 1934 Torneio Rio-São Paulo =

Torneio Rio-São Paulo
- Season: 1934
- Champions: None

The 1934 Torneio Rio São Paulo was the 2nd edition of the Torneio Rio-São Paulo. It was disputed between 16 September to 23 December. The tournament was finalized during the first round due to problems between clubs and state federations.

== Participants ==
Team	City	Nº participations	Best result
America	Rio de Janeiro	2	8th (1933)
Bangu	Rio de Janeiro	2	4th (1933)
Bonsucesso	Rio de Janeiro	2	10th (1933)
Corinthians	(São Paulo (state)) São Paulo	2	6th (1933)
Flamengo	Rio de Janeiro	1	Debut
Fluminense	Rio de Janeiro	2	7th (1933)
Palestra Itália	(São Paulo (state)) São Paulo	2	Champions: 1933
Portuguesa	(São Paulo (state)) São Paulo	2	3rd (1933)
Santos	(São Paulo (state)) Santos	2	9th (1933)
São Cristóvão	Rio de Janeiro	1	Debut
São Paulo	(São Paulo (state)) São Paulo	2	Runners-up: 1933
Vasco da Gama	Rio de Janeiro	2	5th (1933)

== Format ==
The tournament were originally planned in a two groups: one from São Paulo and one from Rio de Janeiro. The two clubs with the best performance in this each group were originally planned to qualifying to the final round.

== Tournament ==
=== São Paulo ===
Pos	Team	Pld	W	D	L	GF	GA	GD	Pts
1	(São Paulo (state)) São Paulo (C)	6	5	0	1	12	7	+5	10
2	(São Paulo (state)) Corinthians	7	5	0	2	7	2	+5	10
3	(São Paulo (state)) Portuguesa	8	2	1	5	9	12	−3	5
4	(São Paulo (state)) Santos	8	2	1	5	10	16	−6	5
5	(São Paulo (state)) Palestra Itália	6	1	2	3	6	8	−2	4

Source: RSSSF
(C) Champions

=== Rio de Janeiro ===
Pos	Team	Pld	W	D	L	GF	GA	GD	Pts
1	Flamengo (C)	16	11	2	3	45	24	+21	24
2	America	16	9	3	4	30	26	+4	21
3	Vasco da Gama	12	6	4	2	22	15	+7	16
4	Fluminense	16	6	4	6	31	27	+4	16
5	Bangu	15	5	5	5	39	38	+1	15
6	São Cristóvão	14	3	3	8	23	33	−10	9
7	Bonsucesso	15	1	1	13	19	47	−28	3

Source: RSSSF
(C) Champions

== Interruption ==
Palestra Itália and Vasco, as the 1934 state champions, demanded to be automatically qualified to the final round. After many rounds had already been played from the Torneio Extra, the Rio de Janeiro league (LCF) accepted the request of Vasco and appointed the club to be one of their representatives in the final round, regardless of the final position of the club. São Paulo association (APEA) did not accepted the same criteria and forced Palestra Itália to play the first stage (later called Torneio dos Cinco Clubes).

Although CBD (Confederação Brasileira de Desportos, amateur) was the national league officially recognized by FIFA, the strongest clubs from both states were affiliated to leagues linked to FBF (Federação Brasileira de Futebol, professional). So, these clubs were not allowed to do trips or play international tours. During the tournament, Fluminense, Flamengo and Vasco, ended lefting LCF (Liga Carioca de Foot-Ball, affiliated to FBF) and joining à FMD (Federação Metropolitana de Desportos, affiliated to CBD), being followed by Palestra Itália and Corinthians, which left APEA (Associação Paulista de Esportes Athléticos, linked to FBF) and founded the LPF (Liga Paulista deFutebol, linked to CBD). Due to these forfeits, the qualifying tournaments were interrupted and the final round never was played.

On the other hand, São Paulo declared itself champion of the São Paulo tournament, and Flamengo of the Rio de Janeiro tournament, however none of the clubs associates this achievement with that of a complete edition of the Torneio Rio-São Paulo.
