= 1951 São Paulo FC season =

São Paulo
1951 season
- Chairman: Cícero Pompeu de Toledo
- Manager: Vicente Feola; Leônidas da Silva; Ariston de Oliveira
- Torneio Rio-São Paulo: 8th
- Campeonato Paulista: 4th

The 1951 football season was São Paulo's 22nd season since the club's founding in 1930.

== Overall ==
Games played	47 (7 Torneio Rio-São Paulo, 28 Campeonato Paulista, 12 Friendly match)
Games won	22 (0 Torneio Rio-São Paulo, 17 Campeonato Paulista, 5 Friendly match)
Games drawn	8 (2 Torneio Rio-São Paulo, 3 Campeonato Paulista, 3 Friendly match)
Games lost	17 (5 Torneio Rio-São Paulo, 8 Campeonato Paulista, 4 Friendly match)
Goals scored	90
Goals conceded	64
Goal difference	+34
Best result	6–1 (A) v Comercial - Campeonato Paulista - 1951.12.09
Worst result	0–4 (A) v Corinthians - Campeonato Paulista - 1951.08.26
Most appearances	
Top scorer	

Source: São Paulo FC

== Friendlies ==
May 6 International	Belenenses (Portugal)	2–4	(Brazil) São Paulo	Lisbon
	Narciso; Pinto de Almeida		Dido; Durval; Bibe	Stadium: Estádio Nacional

May 24 Taça Cidade de São Paulo	Santos	1–2	São Paulo	São Paulo
	Goal		Goal	Stadium: Estádio Paulo Machado de Carvalho (Pacaembu)

May 27 Taça Cidade de São Paulo	Palmeiras	3–2	São Paulo	São Paulo
	Goal		Goal	Stadium: Estádio Paulo Machado de Carvalho (Pacaembu)

May 30 International	São Paulo (Brazil)	0–1	(England) Arsenal	São Paulo
			Goal	Stadium: Estádio Paulo Machado de Carvalho (Pacaembu)

June 13 International	São Paulo (Brazil)	1–1	(England) Portsmouth	São Paulo
	Goal		Goal	Stadium: Estádio Paulo Machado de Carvalho (Pacaembu)

June 29 National	São Paulo	1–0	Ponte Preta	São Paulo
	Goal			Stadium: Estádio Paulo Machado de Carvalho (Pacaembu)

July 7 National	Ponte Preta	2–2	São Paulo	Campinas
	Goal		Goal	Stadium: Estádio Moisés Lucarelli

July 15 National	XV de Jaú	2–0	São Paulo	Jaú
	Goal

July 22 National	Caldense	1–3	São Paulo	Poços de Caldas
	Goal		Goal

September 16 National	Araguari	1–1	São Paulo	Araguari
	Goal		Goal

November 19 National	Itararé	0–4	São Paulo	Itararé
			Goal

December 19 International	São Paulo (Brazil)	0–1	(Argentina) Atlanta	São Paulo
			Goal	Stadium: Estádio Paulo Machado de Carvalho (Pacaembu)

=== São Paulo / Bangu tour to Europe ===
A combined São Paulo-Bangu also traveled across Europe. Games were played with nine wins, two draws and two defeats. And it all started in the Italian city of Genoa on the 29 March and ended in Lisbon, Portugal on the 29 April. Cariocas and São Paulo visited eight countries. The coach was Leônidas da Silva, manager of São Paulo.

March 29 International	Genoa (Italy)	1–1	(Brazil) São Paulo / Bangu	Genoa
	Nilsson		Djalma

April 4 International	RSC Anderlecht (Belgium)	2–1	(Brazil) São Paulo / Bangu	Brussels
	Voussure		Moacir

April 5 International	Liège XI (Belgium)	0–3	(Brazil) São Paulo / Bangu	Liège
			Lauro; Djalma; Bibe

April 7 International	1. FC Saarbrücken (Saar Protectorate)	0–3	(Brazil) São Paulo / Bangu	Saarbrücken
			Durval; Nívio

April 10 International	Netherlands	1–3	(Brazil) São Paulo / Bangu	Amsterdam
	Snoek 42'	Report	Nívio 51'; Bibe 74'; Durval 86'	Stadium: Olympic Stadium; Referee: Klaas Schipper

April 11 International	Rot-Weiss Essen (Germany)	5–1	(Brazil) São Paulo / Bangu	Essen
	Goal		Ponce de León

April 14 International	1. FC Nürnberg (Germany)	0–1	(Brazil) São Paulo / Bangu	Nuremberg
			Durval

April 15 International	TSV 1860 Munich (Germany)	3–4	(Brazil) São Paulo / Bangu	Munich
	Goal		Nívio; Durval; Zizinho

April 17 International	Austria Wien	1–2	(Brazil) São Paulo / Bangu	Vienna
	Melchior		Alcino; Zizinho

April 19 International	Racing Paris (France)	2–3	(Brazil) São Paulo / Bangu	Paris
	Vaast; Gaetjens		Moacir; Zizinho

April 25 International	Lazio (Italy)	0–0	(Brazil) São Paulo / Bangu	Rome

April 27 International	KB (Denmark)	1–3	(Brazil) São Paulo / Bangu	Copenhagen
	Goal		Nívio; Zizinho

April 29 International	Sporting (Portugal)	1–4	(Brazil) São Paulo / Bangu	Lisbon
	Corrêa		Teixeirinha; Durval; Nívio

== Official competitions ==
=== Torneio Rio-São Paulo ===
February 18 1	Palmeiras	2–0	São Paulo	São Paulo
	Goal			Stadium: Estádio Paulo Machado de Carvalho (Pacaembu)

February 25 2	Bangu	4–1	São Paulo	Rio de Janeiro
	Goal		Goal	Stadium: Estádio Municipal do Rio de Janeiro (Maracanã)

March 4 3	São Paulo	2–2	Vasco da Gama	São Paulo
	Goal		Goal	Stadium: Estádio Paulo Machado de Carvalho (Pacaembu)

March 11 4	Corinthians	3–1	São Paulo	São Paulo
	Goal		Goal	Stadium: Estádio Paulo Machado de Carvalho (Pacaembu)

March 14 5	Portuguesa	2–1	São Paulo	São Paulo
	Goal		Goal	Stadium: Estádio Paulo Machado de Carvalho (Pacaembu)

March 18 6	Flamengo	4–2	São Paulo	Rio de Janeiro
	Goal		Goal	Stadium: Estádio Municipal do Rio de Janeiro (Maracanã)

March 25 7	São Paulo	1–1	America-RJ	São Paulo
	Goal		Goal	Stadium: Estádio Paulo Machado de Carvalho (Pacaembu)

==== Record ====
Final Position	Points	Matches	Wins	Draws	Losses	Goals For	Goals Away	Win%
8th	2	7	0	2	5	8	18	14%

=== Campeonato Paulista ===
June 3 1	São Paulo	4–0	Jabaquara	São Paulo
	Goal			Stadium: Estádio Paulo Machado de Carvalho (Pacaembu)

June 10 2	Radium	1–3	São Paulo	Mococa
	Goal		Goal	Stadium: Campo do Radium

June 16 3	São Paulo	3–1	Juventus	São Paulo
	Goal		Goal	Stadium: Estádio Paulo Machado de Carvalho (Pacaembu)

June 24 4	Nacional	0–1	São Paulo	São Paulo
			Goal	Stadium: Estádio Nicolau Alayon (Comendador Sousa)

July 29 5	São Paulo	4–2	Ypiranga	São Paulo
	Goal		Goal	Stadium: Estádio Paulo Machado de Carvalho (Pacaembu)

August 4 6	São Paulo	1–0	Guarani	São Paulo
	Goal			Stadium: Estádio Paulo Machado de Carvalho (Pacaembu)

August 11 7	Santos	3–0	São Paulo	Santos
	Goal			Stadium: Estádio Urbano Caldeira (Vila Belmiro)

August 18 8	São Paulo	3–0	Comercial	São Paulo
	Goal			Stadium: Estádio Paulo Machado de Carvalho (Pacaembu)

August 26 9	Corinthians	4–0	São Paulo	São Paulo
	Goal			Stadium: Estádio Paulo Machado de Carvalho (Pacaembu)

September 2 10	São Paulo	2–1	Portuguesa Santista	São Paulo
	Goal		Goal	Stadium: Estádio Paulo Machado de Carvalho (Pacaembu)

September 12 11	Portuguesa	4–1	São Paulo	São Paulo
	Goal		Goal	Stadium: Estádio Paulo Machado de Carvalho (Pacaembu)

September 23 12	São Paulo	1–0	Palmeiras	São Paulo
	Goal			Stadium: Estádio Paulo Machado de Carvalho (Pacaembu)

September 29 13	São Paulo	2–0	Ponte Preta	São Paulo
	Goal			Stadium: Estádio Paulo Machado de Carvalho (Pacaembu)

October 7 14	XV de Piracicaba	1–1	São Paulo	Piracicaba
	Goal		Goal	Stadium: Rua Regente Feijó

October 21 15	Jabaquara	0–1	São Paulo	Santos
			Goal	Stadium: Estádio Ulrico Mursa

October 28 16	São Paulo	2–0	Radium	São Paulo
	Goal			Stadium: Estádio Paulo Machado de Carvalho (Pacaembu)

November 3 17	São Paulo	1–2	Juventus	São Paulo
	Goal		Goal	Stadium: Estádio Paulo Machado de Carvalho (Pacaembu)

November 11 18	São Paulo	2–1	Nacional	São Paulo
	Goal		Goal	Stadium: Estádio Paulo Machado de Carvalho (Pacaembu)

November 15 19	São Paulo	1–0	Ypiranga	São Paulo
	Goal			Stadium: Estádio Paulo Machado de Carvalho (Pacaembu)

November 25 20	Guarani	2–0	São Paulo	Campinas
	Goal			Stadium: Rua Barão Geraldo de Resende

December 2 21	São Paulo	1–2	Santos	São Paulo
	Goal		Goal	Stadium: Estádio Paulo Machado de Carvalho (Pacaembu)

December 9 22	Comercial	1–6	São Paulo	São Paulo
	Goal		Goal	Stadium: Estádio Conde Rodolfo Crespi (Rua Javari)

December 16 23	São Paulo	1–4	Corinthians	São Paulo
	Goal		Goal	Stadium: Estádio Paulo Machado de Carvalho (Pacaembu)

December 23 24	Portuguesa Santista	0–0	São Paulo	Santos
				Stadium: Estádio Ulrico Mursa

December 30 25	São Paulo	2–1	Portuguesa	São Paulo
	Goal		Goal	Stadium: Estádio Paulo Machado de Carvalho (Pacaembu)

January 13, 1952 26	Palmeiras	3–0	São Paulo	São Paulo
	Goal			Stadium: Estádio Paulo Machado de Carvalho (Pacaembu)

January 20, 1952 27	Ponte Preta	1–1	São Paulo	Campinas
	Goal		Goal	Stadium: Estádio Moisés Lucarelli

January 25, 1952 28	São Paulo	2–0	XV de Piracicaba	São Paulo
	Goal			Stadium: Estádio Paulo Machado de Carvalho (Pacaembu)

==== Record ====
Final Position	Points	Matches	Wins	Draws	Losses	Goals For	Goals Away	Win%
4th	37	28	17	3	8	46	34	66%
