= 1933 Torneio Rio-São Paulo =

Torneio Rio-São Paulo
- Season: 1933
- Champions: Palestra Itália (1st title)
- Matches played: 132
- Goals scored: 559 (4.23 per match)
- Top goalscorer: Waldemar de Brito (São Paulo) – 33 goals
- Biggest home win: Palestra Itália 8–0 Corinthians (5 Nov)

The 1933 Torneio Rio São Paulo was the 1st edition of the Torneio Rio-São Paulo. It was disputed between 7 May to 10 December.

== Participants ==
Team	City
AA São Bento	(São Paulo (state)) São Paulo
America	Rio de Janeiro
Bangu	Rio de Janeiro
Bonsucesso	Rio de Janeiro
Corinthians	(São Paulo (state)) São Paulo
Fluminense	Rio de Janeiro
Palestra Itália	(São Paulo (state)) São Paulo
Portuguesa	(São Paulo (state)) São Paulo
Santos	(São Paulo (state)) Santos
São Paulo	(São Paulo (state)) São Paulo
Vasco da Gama	Rio de Janeiro
Ypiranga	(São Paulo (state)) São Paulo

== Format ==
The tournament were disputed in a double round-robin format, with the club with most points conquered being the champions. The matches between clubs of São Paulo were also valid for the Campeonato Paulista, and the matches between clubs of Rio de Janeiro were also valid for the Campeonato Carioca.

== Tournament ==
Following is the summary of the 1933 Torneio Rio-São Paulo tournament:

Pos	Team	Pld	W	D	L	GF	GA	GD	Pts
1	(São Paulo (state)) Palestra Itália (C)	22	17	2	3	67	25	+42	36
2	(São Paulo (state)) São Paulo	22	16	2	4	75	31	+44	34
3	(São Paulo (state)) Portuguesa	22	12	6	4	57	33	+24	30
4	Bangu	22	13	3	6	65	46	+19	29
5	Vasco da Gama	22	10	4	8	44	31	+13	24
6	(São Paulo (state)) Corinthians	22	10	2	10	31	51	−20	22
7	Fluminense	22	8	4	10	38	41	−3	20
8	America	22	8	2	12	47	65	−18	18
9	(São Paulo (state)) Santos	22	7	3	12	46	57	−11	17
10	Bonsucesso	22	5	6	11	35	50	−15	16
11	(São Paulo (state)) AA São Bento	22	5	3	14	31	52	−21	13
12	(São Paulo (state)) Ypiranga	22	2	1	19	23	77	−54	5

Source: RSSSF
Rules for classification: 1) points; 2) wins; 3) goal difference; 4) goals for.
(C) Champions
