= Antonio Azambuja =

Portuguese footballer

Personal information
- Full name: Antonio Ferreira D’Azambuja
- Date of birth: 10 November 1925
- Place of birth: Carapinheira, Portugal
- Date of death: 3 August 2010 (aged 84)
- Place of death: São Paulo, Brazil
- Position: Midfielder

Youth career
- Saldanha da Gama

Senior career*
| Years | Team | Apps | (Gls) |
| 1946–1949 | São Paulo | 33 | (0) |
- Juventus-SP
- Ferroviária
- * Club domestic league appearances and goals as of 16 August 2025

Antonio Ferreira D’Azambuja (10 November 1925 – 3 August 2010) was a Portuguese professional footballer who played as a midfielder.

== Career ==
Born in Portugal, Azambuja moved to Brazil at the age of eight. He began playing amateur football for Saldanha da Gama club in Santos, and after being scouted by coach Vicente Feola, he was signed by São Paulo in 1946. Azambuja was a reserve player for great players like Bauer and Noronha, playing 33 matches for the club and winning the state championship in 1949. After leaving São Paulo, he also played for CA Juventus and Ferroviária de Araraquara.

== Post career ==
After retiring from football, he worked for years at Radio Jovem Pan. Azambuja died on 3 August 2010, aged 84, in São Paulo.

== Honours ==
São Paulo

- Campeonato Paulista: 1949
