= 1932 São Paulo FC season =

São Paulo
1932 season
- Chairman: Edgard de Souza Aranha
- Manager: Rubens Sales
- Campeonato Paulista: Runners-up

The 1932 football season was São Paulo's 3rd season since the club's founding in 1930.

== Overall ==
Games played	17 (11 Campeonato Paulista, 6 Friendly match)
Games won	13 (8 Campeonato Paulista, 4 Friendly match)
Games drawn	2 (1 Campeonato Paulista, 1 Friendly match)
Games lost	3 (2 Campeonato Paulista, 1 Friendly match)
Goals scored	56
Goals conceded	24
Goal difference	+32
Best result	11–0 (H) v Internacional - Campeonato Paulista - 1932.7.13
Worst result	2–4 (A) v Vasco da Gama - Friendly match - 1932.4.12
Top scorer	

Source: São Paulo FC

2nd Source

== Friendlies ==
April 06, 1932 Taça dos Campeões RJ-SP	São Paulo	3–1	America-RJ	São Paulo
				Stadium: Chácara da Floresta

April 12, 1932 National	Vasco da Gama	4–2	São Paulo	Rio de Janeiro
				Stadium: São Januário

May 12, 1932 National	São Paulo	1–1	Vasco da Gama	São Paulo

May 22, 1932 National	Ruy Barbosa	1–4	São Paulo	São Carlos

June 12, 1932 National	São Paulo	3–2	Comercial

October 30, 1932 Taça Trocadero	São Paulo	4–0	Sírio	São Paulo
	Araken 5'; Araken 25'; Araken 38'; Friedenreich 74'			Stadium: Chácara da Floresta

== Official competitions ==
=== Campeonato Paulista ===
May 1, 1932 1	Portuguesa	2–4	São Paulo	São Paulo
	Albertinho; Raposo		Luizinho; Armandinho; Araken; Junqueirinha	Stadium: Rua Cesário Ramalho

May 8, 1932 2	São Paulo	2–3	Palestra Itália	São Paulo
	Araken; Armandinho		Romeu; Pupo; Pupo	Stadium: Chácara da Floresta

May 15, 1932 3	São Paulo	2–3	Germânia	São Paulo
	Armandinho; Araken		Caetano (o.g.); Nenê; Patrício	Stadium: Chácara da Floresta

May 29, 1932 4	São Paulo	4–0	Santos	São Paulo
	Armandinho; Araken; Armandinho; Luizinho			Stadium: Chácara da Floresta

June 5, 1932 5	São Paulo	2–0	Sírio	São Paulo
	Luizinho; Luizinho			Stadium: Chácara da Floresta

June 19, 1932 6	Corinthians	0–2	São Paulo	São Paulo
			Luizinho; Luizinho	Stadium: Parque São Jorge

June 26, 1932 7	São Paulo	3–3	A.A. São Bento	São Paulo
	Luizinho 12'; Luizinho 30'; Friedenreich 46'		Filardi 1'; Votorantim 60'; Valdemar 90'	Stadium: Chácara da Floresta

July 3, 1932 8	São Paulo	11–0	Internacional	São Paulo
	Araken 20', 47', 57', 63'; Luizinho 23', 55', 66', 73'; Armandinho 26'; Bruno 59' (o.g.); Birigüi (o.g.)			Stadium: Chácara da Floresta

November 20, 1932 9	São Paulo	1–0	Juventus	São Paulo
	Araken 71'			Stadium: Chácara da Floresta

December 4, 1932 10	São Paulo	3–1	Atlético Santista	São Paulo
	Barthô 6'; Araken 56'; Luizinho 84'		Gi 23'	Stadium: Chácara da Floresta

December 18, 1932 11	São Paulo	2–1	Ypiranga	São Paulo
	Luizinho 22'; Luizinho 87'		Paulino 65'	Stadium: Chácara da Floresta

==== Record ====
Final Position	Points	Matches	Wins	Draws	Losses	Goals For	Goals Away	Win%
2nd	17	11	8	1	2	36	13	77%
