= 1945 São Paulo FC season =

São Paulo
1945 season
- Chairman: Décio Pacheco Pedroso
- Manager: Joreca
- Campeonato Paulista: Champions

The 1945 football season was São Paulo's 16th season since the club's founding in 1930.

== Overall ==
Games played	42 (20 Campeonato Paulista, 22 Friendly match)
Games won	26 (16 Campeonato Paulista, 10 Friendly match)
Games drawn	8 (2 Campeonato Paulista, 6 Friendly match)
Games lost	8 (2 Campeonato Paulista, 6 Friendly match)
Goals scored	136
Goals conceded	62
Goal difference	+74
Best result	12–1 (H) v Jabaquara - Campeonato Paulista - 1945.07.08
Worst result	2–6 (A) v Olimpia - Friendly match - 1945.10.12
Most appearances	
Top scorer	

Source: São Paulo FC

== Friendlies ==
February 18 National	São Paulo	3–2	Fluminense	São Paulo
	Goal		Goal	Stadium: Estádio Paulo Machado de Carvalho (Pacaembu)

February 24 National	São Paulo	5–0	Juventus	São Paulo
	Goal			Stadium: Estádio Paulo Machado de Carvalho (Pacaembu)

March 11 Taça Cidade de São Paulo	Palmeiras	1–0	São Paulo	São Paulo
	Goal			Stadium: Estádio Paulo Machado de Carvalho (Pacaembu)

March 14 Taça Cidade de São Paulo	Corinthians	4–4	São Paulo	São Paulo
	Goal		Goal	Stadium: Estádio Paulo Machado de Carvalho (Pacaembu)

March 18 National	Fluminense	2–1	São Paulo	Rio de Janeiro
	Goal		Goal	Stadium: Estádio Manoel Schwartz (das Laranjeiras)

March 31 National	Ponte Preta	1–4	São Paulo	Campinas
	Goal		Goal	Stadium: Estádio Horácio da Costa (da Mogiana)

May 23 National	São Paulo	2–2	Vasco da Gama	São Paulo
	Goal		Goal	Stadium: Estádio Paulo Machado de Carvalho (Pacaembu)

June 10 National	Mogiana	0–1	São Paulo	Campinas
			Goal	Stadium: Estádio Horácio da Costa (da Mogiana)

June 20 National	Vasco da Gama	2–0	São Paulo	Rio de Janeiro
	Goal			Stadium: Estádio Vasco da Gama (São Januário)

July 15 National	Uberaba	3–5	São Paulo	Uberaba
	Goal		Goal	Stadium: Estádio Boulanger Pucci

July 15 National	Comercial	1–11	São Paulo	Lins
	Goal		Goal

August 5 Taça José Ferreira Keffer	BAC / Noroeste	1–2	(Brazil) São Paulo	Bauru
	Goal		Goal	Stadium: Estádio Alfredo de Castilho

October 7 Copa Pres. Morinigo	Libertad (Paraguay)	1–1	(Brazil) São Paulo	Asunción
	Goal		Goal	Stadium: Estadio de Puerto Sajonia

October 12 Copa Francisco Lima	Olimpia (Paraguay)	6–2	(Brazil) São Paulo	Asunción
	Goal		Goal	Stadium: Estadio de Puerto Sajonia

October 14 Copa Col. Brasileira	Cerro Porteño (Paraguay)	0–1	(Brazil) São Paulo	Asunción
			Goal	Stadium: Estadio de Puerto Sajonia

October 28 International	Atlético Chalaco (Peru)	1–1	(Brazil) São Paulo	Lima
	Goal		Goal	Stadium: Estadio Nacional

November 1 International	Deportivo Municipal (Peru)	1–1	(Brazil) São Paulo	Lima
	Goal		Goal	Stadium: Estadio Nacional

November 1 International	Universitario (Peru)	1–5	(Brazil) São Paulo	Lima
	Goal		Goal	Stadium: Estadio Nacional

November 25 National	Santos	3–4	São Paulo	Santos
	Goal		Goal	Stadium: Estádio Urbano Caldeira (Vila Belmiro)

December 1 National	Portuguesa	1–0	São Paulo	São Paulo
	Goal			Stadium: Estádio Paulo Machado de Carvalho (Pacaembu)

December 9 National	Brasil de Paraguaçu	3–10	São Paulo	Paraguaçu Paulista
	Goal		Goal

December 19 Copa Pres. Morinigo	São Paulo (Brazil)	4–5	(Paraguay) Libertad	São Paulo
	Goal		Goal	Stadium: Estádio Paulo Machado de Carvalho (Pacaembu)

December 30 International	São Paulo (Brazil)	2–2	(Argentina) Rosario Central	São Paulo
	Goal		Goal	Stadium: Estádio Paulo Machado de Carvalho (Pacaembu)

== Official competitions ==
=== Campeonato Paulista ===
April 8 1	Jabaquara	2–6	São Paulo	Santos
	Goal		Goal	Stadium: Estádio Ulrico Mursa

April 15 2	Ypiranga	1–3	São Paulo	São Paulo
	Goal		Goal	Stadium: Estádio Paulo Machado de Carvalho (Pacaembu)

April 22 3	São Paulo	1–0	Palmeiras	São Paulo
	Goal			Stadium: Estádio Paulo Machado de Carvalho (Pacaembu)

April 28 4	Juventus	1–4	São Paulo	São Paulo
	Goal		Goal	Stadium: Estádio Paulo Machado de Carvalho (Pacaembu)

May 6 5	São Paulo	3–2	Corinthians	São Paulo
	Goal		Goal	Stadium: Estádio Paulo Machado de Carvalho (Pacaembu)

May 13 6	Santos	1–1	São Paulo	Santos
	Goal		Goal	Stadium: Estádio Urbano Caldeira (Vila Belmiro)

May 20 7	São Paulo Railway	1–4	São Paulo	São Paulo
	Goal		Goal	Stadium: Estádio Paulo Machado de Carvalho (Pacaembu)

May 26 8	São Paulo	4–1	Comercial	São Paulo
	Goal		Goal	Stadium: Estádio Paulo Machado de Carvalho (Pacaembu)

June 3 9	Portuguesa	1–2	São Paulo	São Paulo
	Goal		Goal	Stadium: Estádio Paulo Machado de Carvalho (Pacaembu)

June 17 10	São Paulo	5–0	Portuguesa Santista	São Paulo
	Goal			Stadium: Estádio Paulo Machado de Carvalho (Pacaembu)

July 8 11	São Paulo	12–1	Jabaquara	São Paulo
	Goal		Goal	Stadium: Estádio Paulo Machado de Carvalho (Pacaembu)

July 21 12	São Paulo	6–1	São Paulo Railway	São Paulo
	Goal		Goal	Stadium: Estádio Paulo Machado de Carvalho (Pacaembu)

July 29 13	São Paulo	1–0	Juventus	São Paulo
	Goal			Stadium: Estádio Paulo Machado de Carvalho (Pacaembu)

August 12 14	Corinthians	2–1	São Paulo	São Paulo
	Goal		Goal	Stadium: Estádio Paulo Machado de Carvalho (Pacaembu)

August 19 15	São Paulo	4–0	Santos	São Paulo
	Goal			Stadium: Estádio Paulo Machado de Carvalho (Pacaembu)

August 26 16	São Paulo	2–1	Portuguesa	São Paulo
	Goal		Goal	Stadium: Estádio Paulo Machado de Carvalho (Pacaembu)

September 9 17	Comercial	1–2	São Paulo	São Paulo
	Goal		Goal	Stadium: Estádio Paulo Machado de Carvalho (Pacaembu)

September 16 18	São Paulo	3–2	Ypiranga	São Paulo
	Goal		Goal	Stadium: Estádio Paulo Machado de Carvalho (Pacaembu)

September 23 19	Palmeiras	1–1	São Paulo	São Paulo
	Goal		Goal	Stadium: Estádio Paulo Machado de Carvalho (Pacaembu)

September 30 20	Portuguesa Santista	1–5	São Paulo	Santos
	Goal		Goal	Stadium: Estádio Ulrico Mursa

==== Record ====
Final Position	Points	Matches	Wins	Draws	Losses	Goals For	Goals Away	Win%
1st	36	20	17	2	1	70	20	85%
