= 1943 São Paulo FC season =

São Paulo
1943 season
- Chairman: Décio Pacheco Pedroso
- Manager: Conrad Ross; Joreca
- Campeonato Paulista: Champions

The 1943 football season was São Paulo's 14th season since the club's founding in 1930.

== Overall ==
Games played	43 (20 Campeonato Paulista, 23 Friendly match)
Games won	31 (15 Campeonato Paulista, 16 Friendly match)
Games drawn	7 (3 Campeonato Paulista, 4 Friendly match)
Games lost	5 (2 Campeonato Paulista, 3 Friendly match)
Goals scored	136
Goals conceded	44
Goal difference	+92
Best result	10–0 (A) v Olímpico - Friendly match - 1943.11.14
Worst result	1–3 (A) v Fluminense - Friendly match - 1943.04.21
Most appearances	
Top scorer	

Source: São Paulo FC

== Friendlies ==
January 17 National	São Paulo	3–3	Juventus	São Paulo
	Goal		Goal	Stadium: Estádio Paulo Machado de Carvalho (Pacaembu)

January 24 National	Santos	0–2	São Paulo	São Paulo
			Goal	Stadium: Estádio Paulo Machado de Carvalho (Pacaembu)

February 10 National	São Paulo	2–2	Vasco da Gama	São Paulo
	Goal		Goal	Stadium: Estádio Paulo Machado de Carvalho (Pacaembu)

February 13 National	São Paulo	2–0	Jabaquara	São Paulo
	Goal			Stadium: Estádio Paulo Machado de Carvalho (Pacaembu)

February 17 National	Santos	1–2	São Paulo	Santos
	Goal		Goal	Stadium: Estádio Urbano Caldeira (Vila Belmiro)

February 20 National	São Paulo	4–2	Ypiranga	São Paulo
	Goal		Goal	Stadium: Estádio Paulo Machado de Carvalho (Pacaembu)

February 25 National	Cruzeiro	0–5	São Paulo	Belo Horizonte
			Goal	Stadium: Estádio Presidente Antônio Carlos (de Lourdes)

February 28 National	Atlético Mineiro	1–0	São Paulo	Belo Horizonte
	Goal			Stadium: Estádio Presidente Antônio Carlos (de Lourdes)

April 21 National	Fluminense	3–1	São Paulo	Rio de Janeiro
	Goal		Goal	Stadium: Estádio Manoel Schwartz (das Laranjeiras)

May 19 National	São Paulo	3–0	Fluminense	São Paulo
	Goal			Stadium: Estádio Paulo Machado de Carvalho (Pacaembu)

June 3 National	São Paulo	3–1	Vasco da Gama	São Paulo
	Goal		Goal	Stadium: Estádio Paulo Machado de Carvalho (Pacaembu)

June 24 Taça Cidade de São Paulo	São Paulo	1–1	Corinthians	São Paulo
	Goal		Goal	Stadium: Estádio Paulo Machado de Carvalho (Pacaembu)

June 27 Taça Cidade de São Paulo	Palmeiras	0–0	São Paulo	São Paulo
				Stadium: Estádio Paulo Machado de Carvalho (Pacaembu)

July 8 Olímpiada Tricolor	Fluminense	3–2	São Paulo	Rio de Janeiro
	Goal		Goal	Stadium: Estádio Manoel Schwartz (das Laranjeiras)

July 20 Taça Eurico Gaspar Dutra	São Paulo	3–2	Flamengo	São Paulo
	Goal		Goal	Stadium: Estádio Paulo Machado de Carvalho (Pacaembu)

September 15 National	Vasco da Gama	2–3	São Paulo	Niterói
	Goal		Goal	Stadium: Estádio Caio Martins

September 19 National	Luiz de Queiroz	2–8	São Paulo	Piracicaba
	Goal		Goal

October 16 National	São Paulo	3–0	Ypiranga	São Paulo
	Goal			Stadium: Estádio Paulo Machado de Carvalho (Pacaembu)

October 24 Taça dos Campeões RJ-SP	São Paulo	3–0	Flamengo	São Paulo
	Goal			Stadium: Estádio Paulo Machado de Carvalho (Pacaembu)

November 1 National	Velo Clube	1–5	São Paulo	Rio Claro
	Goal		Goal

November 14 Taça Fabar	Operário (Ourinhos)	0–10	São Paulo	Ourinhos
			Goal

November 15 National	Jacarezinho	0–2	São Paulo	Jacarezinho
			Goal

December 5 Taça Branca Drayse	Francana	2–3	São Paulo	Franca

December 8 National	Santo André XI	0–2	São Paulo	Santo André

December 12 National	Caçapavense	2–2	São Paulo	Caçapava

December 19 National	Votorantim	2–3	São Paulo	Sorocaba

== Official competitions ==
=== Campeonato Paulista ===
March 21 1	São Paulo	4–1	Comercial	São Paulo
	Goal		Goal	Stadium: Estádio Paulo Machado de Carvalho (Pacaembu)

March 27 2	São Paulo	1–2	Ypiranga	São Paulo
	Goal		Goal	Stadium: Estádio Paulo Machado de Carvalho (Pacaembu)

April 4 3	São Paulo	5–1	São Paulo Railway	São Paulo
	Goal		Goal	Stadium: Estádio Paulo Machado de Carvalho (Pacaembu)

April 11 4	São Paulo	4–2	Jabaquara	São Paulo
	Goal		Goal	Stadium: Estádio Paulo Machado de Carvalho (Pacaembu)

April 18 5	São Paulo	1–1	Portuguesa	São Paulo
	Goal		Goal	Stadium: Estádio Paulo Machado de Carvalho (Pacaembu)

May 2 6	São Paulo	1–2	Corinthians	São Paulo
	Goal		Goal	Stadium: Estádio Paulo Machado de Carvalho (Pacaembu)

May 8 7	São Paulo	1–1	Juventus	São Paulo
	Goal		Goal	Stadium: Estádio Paulo Machado de Carvalho (Pacaembu)

May 16 8	São Paulo	6–1	Santos	São Paulo
	Goal		Goal	Stadium: Estádio Paulo Machado de Carvalho (Pacaembu)

June 01 9	São Paulo	8–1	Portuguesa Santista	São Paulo
	Goal		Goal	Stadium: Estádio Paulo Machado de Carvalho (Pacaembu)

June 13 10	Palmeiras	1–2	São Paulo	São Paulo
	Goal		Goal	Stadium: Estádio Paulo Machado de Carvalho (Pacaembu)

July 4 11	São Paulo Railway	1–2	São Paulo	São Paulo
	Goal		Goal	Stadium: Estádio Paulo Machado de Carvalho (Pacaembu)

July 18 12	Comercial	1–2	São Paulo	São Paulo
	Goal		Goal	Stadium: Estádio Paulo Machado de Carvalho (Pacaembu)

July 24 13	Jabaquara	2–3	São Paulo	São Paulo
	Goal		Goal	Stadium: Estádio Paulo Machado de Carvalho (Pacaembu)

August 1 14	Ypiranga	1–2	São Paulo	São Paulo
	Goal		Goal	Stadium: Estádio Paulo Machado de Carvalho (Pacaembu)

August 8 15	Portuguesa	0–3	São Paulo	São Paulo
			Goal	Stadium: Estádio Paulo Machado de Carvalho (Pacaembu)

August 14 16	Portuguesa Santista	0–9	São Paulo	São Paulo
			Goal	Stadium: Estádio Conde Rodolfo Crespi (Rua Javari)

August 22 17	Juventus	2–3	São Paulo	São Paulo
	Goal		Goal	Stadium: Estádio Paulo Machado de Carvalho (Pacaembu)

September 5 18	São Paulo	2–0	Corinthians	São Paulo
	Goal			Stadium: Estádio Paulo Machado de Carvalho (Pacaembu)

September 12 19	Santos	1–4	São Paulo	Santos
	Goal		Goal	Stadium: Estádio Urbano Caldeira (Vila Belmiro)

October 3 20	São Paulo	0–0	Palmeiras	São Paulo
				Stadium: Estádio Paulo Machado de Carvalho (Pacaembu)

==== Record ====
Final Position	Points	Matches	Wins	Draws	Losses	Goals For	Goals Away	Win%
1st	33	20	15	3	2	63	21	82%
