= 1939 in Brazilian football =

Football in Brazil
- Season: 1939

The following article presents a summary of the 1939 football (soccer) season in Brazil, which was the 38th season of competitive football in the country.

== Campeonato Paulista ==
Final Standings

Position	Team	Points	Played	Won	Drawn	Lost	For	Against	Difference
1	Corinthians	36	20	17	2	1	63	16	47
2	Palestra Itália-SP	30	20	13	4	3	56	25	31
3	Portuguesa	26	20	12	2	6	41	33	8
4	São Paulo Railway	24	20	11	2	7	49	41	8
5	São Paulo	21	20	10	1	9	41	28	13
6	Santos	20	20	8	4	8	35	33	2
7	Juventus	17	20	7	3	10	33	37	-4
8	Hespanha	14	20	5	4	11	28	46	-18
9	Portuguesa Santista	12	20	6	0	14	32	54	-22
10	Comercial-SP	11	20	4	3	13	23	64	-41
11	Ypiranga-SP	9	20	4	1	15	27	51	-24

Corinthians declared as the Campeonato Paulista champions.

== State championship champions ==
State	Champion	State	Champion
Acre	-	Paraíba	Auto Esporte
Alagoas	CRB	Paraná	Coritiba
Amapá	-	Pernambuco	Náutico
Amazonas	Nacional	Piauí	-
Bahia	Ypiranga-BA	Rio de Janeiro	Americano
Ceará	Ceará	Rio de Janeiro (DF)	Flamengo
Espírito Santo	Rio Branco-ES	Rio Grande do Norte	ABC
Goiás	-	Rio Grande do Sul	Riograndense
Maranhão	Maranhão	Rondônia	-
Mato Grosso	-	Santa Catarina	Figueirense
Minas Gerais	Atlético Mineiro	São Paulo	Corinthians
Pará	Paysandu	Sergipe	Ipiranga-SE

== Other competition champions ==
Competition	Champion
Campeonato Brasileiro de Seleções Estaduais	Rio de Janeiro (DF)

== Brazil national team ==
The following table lists all the games played by the Brazil national football team in official competitions and friendly matches during 1939.

Date	Opposition	Result	Score	Brazil scorers	Competition
January 15, 1939	Argentina	L	1-5	Leônidas da Silva	Roca Cup
January 22, 1939	Argentina	W	3-2	Adílson, Leônidas da Silva, Perácio	Roca Cup
