= Sérgio Valentim =

Brazilian footballer

Personal information
- Full name: Sérgio Wágner Valentim
- Date of birth: 22 May 1945 (age 81)
- Place of birth: Chavantes, Brazil
- Position: Goalkeeper

Senior career*
Years	Team	Apps	(Gls)
1964–1966	São José		
1966–1974	São Paulo	202	(0)
1967	→ Taubaté (loan)		
1968	→ Paulista (loan)		
1974	→ Ferroviária (loan)		
1975–1976	Corinthians	61	(0)
1977	Coritiba		
1978–1979	São José		
1980	Juventus		

Managerial career
- 1990–1991: Grêmio Santanense
- 1993: Jacareí
- 1999: Taubaté
- 2000–2001: São José
- 2001: Taubaté
- * Club domestic league appearances and goals as of 1 September 2023

Sérgio Wágner Valentim (born 22 May 1945), also known as Sérgio Valentim or simply Sérgio, is a Brazilian former professional footballer and manager who played as a goalkeeper.

== Career ==
Sérgio started his career at São José EC, where, because of the number of difficult defenses he faced, he was nicknamed "São Sérgio". He later played for São Paulo, where he won two Campeonato Paulista titles, and for Corinthians, when he suffered a serious fracture in his arm.

Until today, he holds the record for the longest streak without conceding a goal for São Paulo FC (883 minutes in 1972).

== Honours ==
=== São Paulo ===
- Campeonato Paulista: 1970, 1971
