= Juvenal Juvêncio =

Brazilian lawyer and football manager (1934–2015)

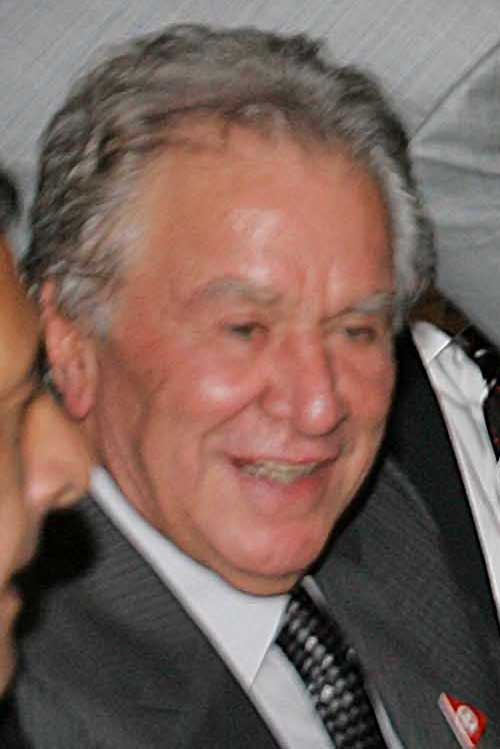
- Born: 25 February 1934; Santa Rosa de Viterbo, Brazil
- Died: 9 December 2015 (aged 81); São Paulo, Brazil
- Resting place: Morumbi Cemetery, São Paulo
- Occupation: President of São Paulo Futebol Clube
- Years active: 1984–2014

Juvenal Juvêncio (25 February 1934 – 9 December 2015) was a Brazilian lawyer, state representative, investigator of police, and president of São Paulo Futebol Clube. During the legislature 1963–1967, he took over in alternate condition, state deputy mandate. He was also head of Cecap (current CDHU), during the government of São Paulo state governor Laudo Natel (1971–1975). After leaving the presidency, he later became the director of an amateur football club.

== Biography ==
Juvenal Juvencio was the president of the São Paulo Futebol Clube.

His first major role at the club was as the football director, between 1984 and 1988, during the administration of Carlos Miguel Aidar as president. When he took office, he made what he called the "reciclagem (recycling)," to dispense with players who had been at the club for years and were idols of the fans, such as Waldir Peres, Renato, and Zé Sérgio.

With the end of the second term of Aidar, he was elected president in April 1988 by just a one-vote difference, but a social manager paid the club, which generated opposition protests, despite the vote of the member being permitted by ordinance. The term was from 1988 to 1990, in which he won the title at the Paulista Championship in 1989 and the Brazilian runner-up in the same year. But 1990 saw the team hold a lackluster campaign in the Championship, and they did not qualify for the green group the following year with the traditional rivals. During his tenure, the São Paulo also won an unofficial title in 1989 at the Guadalajara Tournament in Mexico.

Between 2003 and 2006, he served as Director of Football, being responsible for assembling the championship team of the Libertadores and the Intercontinental Cup in 2005. Then, President Marcelo Portugal Gouvea had to insist that Juvêncio should be accepted into the club. During the campaign that won the Libertadores title, Juvencio arrived to give Cavalariças a few players, such as Souza and Cicinho.

He became club president again in 2006 when he got the title of Brazilian champion three times in a row from 2006 to 2008. He was re-elected on 22 April 2008, with 147 for him, with 64 for the opposition, led by former judoka Aurelio Miguel. Juvêncio was chosen for the first three-year term, after the change of club status. With it, he had the April 2008 mandate to April 2011.

He has been criticized for having conflicting relationships with many leaders from other clubs and sports entities, which would harm the São Paulo in the opinion of these people. Juvenal's answer is that he is defending the interests of the club. Juvenal is also praised for his dedication to the club, which "breath 24 hours a day" according to the Jornal da Tarde.

Juvenal was elected again for another three years in April 2011, but this dispute follows controversy within the club. While recourse, he remained as president of the club. After three terms as president, Juvenal came to occupy the post of Director of Football Athletes of Cotia Formation Center. After a few months on the job, he was fired by then-President Carlos Miguel Aidar, due to disagreements between them.

== Controversy ==
After the episode that took the Morumbi Stadium to be replaced by the Arena Corinthians in the list for the 2014 World Cup stadiums, in 2010, Juvenal criticized the future stadium of Corinthians, due, according to him, to poor conditions in the neighborhood.

In 2011, Juvêncio traded barbs with Andrés Sánchez, the rival of the agent in a series of offenses ton accusations that this would have "inconclusive evidence" in an attempt to offend the disaffected by their low education.

Back in December 2012, after the draw that would cross the São Paulo with Bolivar in Libertadores next year, these, confusion knowledgeable occurred in the final of the Copa Sudamericana (when the tricolor won the Argentine Tiger by Wo, because according to visitors, the matches assaults by security guards of the Morumbi Stadium), were ionized by JJ because they would not want to work in the field are Pauline citing lack of security. "Then I propose an exchange with them," said Juvêncio. "If they send the second game in a city that does not have altitude, we put the first match in a stadium to choose them here."

In the same year, in an interview with radio Estadão / ESPN, Juvêncio "killed" the former president of the CBF Ricardo Teixeira. The agent is Pauline: "He ended up coming [CBF] the father [former FIFA president Joao Havelange]. Some people say until he was good, brought the Cup etc. But I think Ricardo is not a football man. From there, I understand that he's gone. It is now that we will talk about it because it is gone. To our positions were [different] when he was alive, but he was gone. "Twisted" by the death of the representative of the CBF: "A few days later, however, JJ assumed, that he [Teixeira] could not eat right because he had diabetes and I hoping to see if he died, but he was alive there!"

In March 2013, following the suggestion Emerson Leão for Juvêncio the example of Pope Benedict XVI, to resign from office, the representative shall Pauline said the former coach of the club "need to get a job soon." The controversy with former coach São-Paulino would become recurrent in 2013. In April, Leo said, "I think Juvenal was, say in the past, a great president, and helped São Paulo with their innovative ideas. Today, I think he has gone."

The charisma and the lack of mincing Juvenal Juvêncio language turned out to be key factors in creating a fake online agent. "Tanned" by more than 17,000 people on the social network Facebook and on the characteristics of a "Football manager Senior fond of Scottish drinks, collector of different horses," the character based on JJ even released under the title of "Whisky with crackers," a book. Despite the success and work, responsible for representing the hat said the play did not yield your profits but rather that it was performed only to perpetuate Juvêncio.

On 10 May 2013, Juvenal Juvencio, after eliminations are-Pauline in Libertadores and Paulistão announced the permanence of Ney Franco in the position of coach of the club, explaining that such professional "is correct (...), are hardworking, you know and, over time (...), is making its effort "but, instead, dismissed seven players, citing lack of correspondence of some. In the same news, as it upheld such waivers, Juvêncio called Estádio Independência, where São Paulo fell in the South American competition after a resounding defeat by 4-1 before Atlético Mineiro, a "trap". For Marco Aurelio Cunha, one of the biggest opponents of Juvêncio, in rejecting such a large number of players, agent "is wrong and then will do it again, it is the confession of a failed strategy."

In June, Juvenal began to lose allies within the club. The likely confirmation of Carlos Augusto de Barros e Silva, the Leco, to be the candidate of the situation in the 2014 elections has made the current president see the administrative vice president, Ricardo Haddad, resign. Thus, the main opponent of the current administration, Marco Aurelio Cunha, celebrated the moment and stated that "the trend is only to prove."

On 11 July, the presentation of Paulo Autuori as the new coach of São Paulo, Juvêncio "stole the show", drawing attention to their stories and cases. The governing, among other things, said he was "ashamed" of poor form, said that due to the "bone tired", common in football, changed the whole cast when necessary, keeping only the goalkeeper Rogerio Ceni, and questioned whether the problem of the club was not administrative, Juvêncio challenged the reporter to verify, among athletes, "if there is dissatisfaction with the board," implying no hierarchical differences and wage delays in the Tricolor, a factor that does not exist would dissatisfaction of the players.

At the same event, President-Pauline also presented research that, despite not having been questioned in the collective, was presented regardless; this, JJ recorded the time that rival coaches Corinthians had been in office since 2003, wanting to point out that the guild that manages has the same problems as their peers. Moreover, when asked about the crowd pressure by hiring Muricy Ramalho for technical football direction, Juvêncio used the example of the side Cicinho, who, for the leader, it was an expensive signing and did not yield expected during his second spell at the club.

On 21 July 2013, one day after the crushing defeat tricolor for Cruzeiro by 3–0 in full Morumbi Stadium, JJ organized a barbecue in the same place of departure and was one of the centers for the climate is warmed up in socializing. At one point, the representative went on to discuss with members of the opposition, this discussion would have evolved even to physical violence.

On 3 January 2014, during the draw of the São Paulo junior team with the Japanese Kashiwa Reysol by 1-1, valid for the Copa São Paulo de Futebol Júnior, Juvêncio was the target of protests by members of an organized club, requiring reinforcements in the first team. Unhappy with the low number of players contracted for 2014—the only one so far had been the former side of the Portuguese Luis Ricardo—uniformed made chorus against the possible election of the plate of the situation. The agent, Instead, using the example of the recently negotiated Aloisio defended himself from criticism of his administration: "Do you think I sell and buy for leisure act Well ...?" For four Juvenal mandates directed the São Paulo, was the most successful president in club history, with nine titles in the bag.

== Death ==
Juvêncio had prostate cancer for several years, but the disease weakened his health in the final months before his death. He died at 8:30 BRST on 9 December 2015, aged 81. The funeral took place in the noble hall of the Cicero Pompeu de Toledo Stadium Morumbi, and the burial took place on 10 December 2015 at the Cemitério do Morumbi. The City of São Paulo decreed three days of official mourning in his honor.
