= Luis Bonelli =

Argentine footballer

Personal information
- Full name: Luis Bonelli
- Date of birth: 25 June 1928
- Place of birth: Mendoza, Argentina
- Date of death: Unknown
- Position: Goalkeeper

Youth career
- Gimnasia Mendoza

Senior career*
Years	Team	Apps	(Gls)
–1955	Gimnasia Mendoza		
1955–1956	Comercial-RP		
1956–1957	São Paulo	52	(0)
1957–1958	Taubaté		
- * Club domestic league appearances and goals as of 30 June 2025

Luis Bonelli (25 June 1928 – ?) was an Argentine professional footballer who played as a goalkeeper.

== Career ==
Born in Mendoza, Argentina, Bonelli began his football career with Gimnasia y Esgrima. In 1955, he arrived in Brazilian football, playing for Comercial de Ribeirão Preto and being one of the team's standout players in the 1955 Campeonato Paulista, which earned him a transfer to São Paulo FC. Bonelli made 52 appearances for the club between 1956 and 1957, but due to some failures in the final part of his spell at the club, he transferred to EC Taubaté during February 1957, where he remained until 1958. After his time with the club, his fate is unknown.
