= Clodô =

Brazilian footballer (born 1899)

Personal information
- Full name: Clodoaldo Caldeira
- Date of birth: 1 December 1899
- Place of birth: Botucatu, Brazil
- Position: Defender

International career
Years	Team	Apps	(Gls)
1922–1925	Brazil	4	(0)

Clodoaldo Caldeira (born 1 December 1899, date of death unknown), known as Clodô, was a Brazilian footballer. He played in four matches for the Brazil national football team from 1922 to 1925. He was also part of Brazil's squad for the 1925 South American Championship.
