= 1933 in Brazilian football =

Football in Brazil
- Season: 1933

The following article presents a summary of the 1933 football (soccer) season in Brazil, which was the 32nd season of competitive football in the country.

== Torneio Rio-São Paulo ==
Final Standings

Position	Team	Points	Played	Won	Drawn	Lost	For	Against	Difference
1	Palestra Itália-SP	36	22	17	2	3	67	25	42
2	São Paulo	34	22	16	2	4	75	31	44
3	Portuguesa	30	22	12	6	4	57	33	24
4	Bangu	29	22	13	3	6	65	46	19
5	Vasco da Gama	24	22	10	4	8	44	31	13
6	Corinthians	22	22	10	2	10	31	51	-20
7	Fluminense	20	22	8	4	10	38	41	-3
8	América	18	22	8	2	12	47	65	-18
9	Santos	17	22	7	3	12	46	57	-11
10	Bonsucesso	16	22	5	6	11	35	50	-15
11	AA São Bento	13	22	5	3	14	31	52	-21
12	Ypiranga-SP	5	22	2	1	19	23	77	-54

Palestra Itália-SP declared as the Torneio Rio-São Paulo champions.

== Campeonato Paulista ==
Final Standings

Position	Team	Points	Played	Won	Drawn	Lost	For	Against	Difference
1	Palestra Itália-SP	25	14	12	1	1	48	13	35
2	São Paulo	23	14	11	1	2	62	16	46
3	Portuguesa	21	14	9	3	2	41	16	25
4	Corinthians	15	14	7	1	6	31	38	-7
5	Santos	13	14	6	1	7	41	38	3
6	AA São Bento	9	14	4	1	9	19	27	-8
7	Ypiranga-SP	6	14	3	0	11	20	44	-24
8	Sírio	0	14	0	0	14	10	80	-70

Palestra Itália-SP declared as the Campeonato Paulista champions.

== State championship champions ==
State	Champion	State	Champion
Acre	-	Paraíba	Palmeiras-PB
Alagoas	CSA	Paraná	Coritiba
Amapá	-	Pernambuco	Santa Cruz
Amazonas	Nacional	Piauí	-
Bahia	Bahia	Rio de Janeiro	Canto do Rio
Ceará	Fortaleza	Rio de Janeiro (DF)	Botafogo (by AMEA); Bangu (by LFC)
Espírito Santo	Vitória-ES	Rio Grande do Norte	ABC
Goiás	-	Rio Grande do Sul	São Paulo-RS
Maranhão	Sampaio Corrêa	Rondônia	-
Mato Grosso	-	Santa Catarina	the competition was not concluded
Minas Gerais	Villa Nova	São Paulo	Palestra Itália-SP
Pará	Remo	Sergipe	Sergipe

== Other competition champions ==
Competition	Champion
Campeonato Brasileiro de Seleções Estaduais	São Paulo

== Brazil national team ==
The Brazil national football team did not play any matches in 1933.
