= List of SE Palmeiras players =

This is a list of notable footballers who have played for Palmeiras.

== Legends ==
- (Argentina) Echevarrieta
- (Argentina) González
- (Argentina) Luis Artime
- (Argentina) Luiz Villa
- (Argentina) Norberto Madurga
- (Brazil) Ademar Pantera
- (Brazil) Ademir da Guia
- (Brazil) Aldemar
- (Brazil) Alex
- (Brazil) Alfredo Mostarda
- (Brazil) Amaral
- (Brazil) Américo Murolo
- (Brazil) Amílcar Barbuy
- (Brazil) Antônio Carlos Zago
- (Brazil) Aquiles
- (Brazil) Avelino
- (Brazil) Aymoré Moreira
- (Brazil) Baldocchi
- (Brazil) Begliomini
- (Brazil) Bianco Spartaco
- (Brazil) Caetano Izzo
- (Brazil) Cafu
- (Brazil) Caieira
- (Brazil) Canhotinho
- (Brazil) Carnera
- (Brazil) César Maluco
- (Brazil) César Sampaio
- (Brazil) Chinesinho
- (Brazil) Cléber
- (Brazil) Del Nero
- (Brazil) Dema
- (Brazil) Djalma Dias
- (Brazil) Djalma Santos
- (Brazil) Djalminha
- (Brazil) Dudu
- (Brazil) Dula
- (Brazil) Edmundo
- (Brazil) Edu Bala
- (Brazil) Edu Manga
- (Brazil) Euller
- (Brazil) Eurico
- (Brazil) Émerson Leão
- (Brazil) Evair
- (Brazil) Fábio Crippa
- (Brazil) Fedato
- (Brazil) Ferrari
- (Brazil) Flávio Conceição
- (Brazil) Galeano
- (Brazil) Geraldo Scotto
- (Brazil) Gildo
- (Brazil) Goliardo
- (Brazil) Heitor
- (Brazil) Humberto Tozzi
- (Brazil) Jair Rosa Pinto
- (Brazil) Jorge Mendonça
- (Brazil) Jorginho Putinatti
- (Brazil) Julinho Botelho
- (Brazil) Juninho
- (Brazil) Júnior
- (Brazil) Júnior Baiano
- (Brazil) Junqueira
- (Brazil) Jurandyr
- (Brazil) Juvenal Amarijo
- (Brazil) Lara
- (Brazil) Leivinha
- (Brazil) Lima
- (Brazil) Liminha
- (Brazil) Loschiavo
- (Brazil) Luiz "Gino" Imparato
- (Brazil) Luis Pereira
- (Brazil) Luisinho
- (Brazil) Marcos
- (Brazil) Mazinho
- (Brazil) Minuca
- (Brazil) Mirandinha
- (Brazil) Nascimento
- (Brazil) Nei
- (Brazil) Oberdan Cattani
- (Brazil) Og Moreira
- (Brazil) Oséas
- (Brazil) Paulo Nunes
- (Brazil) Picagli
- (Brazil) Picasso
- (Brazil) Rinaldo
- (Brazil) Rivaldo
- (Brazil) Roberto Carlos
- (Brazil) Rodrigues Tatu
- (Brazil) Romeiro
- (Brazil) Romeu Pellicciari
- (Brazil) Pio
- (Brazil) Ronaldo Drummond
- (Brazil) Roque Júnior
- (Brazil) Rosemiro
- (Brazil) Salvador
- (Brazil) Serafini
- (Brazil) Sérgio
- (Brazil) Servílio
- (Brazil) Tonhão
- (Brazil) Toninho Quintino
- (Brazil) Túlio
- (Brazil) Tunga
- (Brazil) Tupãzinho
- (Brazil) Vágner Bacharel
- (Brazil) Valdemar Carabina
- (Brazil) Valdir de Moraes
- (Brazil) Vavá
- (Brazil) Velloso
- (Brazil) Waldemar Fiúme
- (Brazil) Zeca
- (Brazil) Zequinha
- (Brazil) Zezé Procópio
- (Brazil) Zinho
- (Brazil) (Argentina) Ponce de León
- (Brazil) (Italy) Gabardo
- (Brazil) (Italy) José Altafini
- (Brazil) (Italy) Ministrinho
- (Colombia) Freddy Rincón
- (Italy) Giovanni del Ministro
- (Italy) (Brazil) Primo Zanotta
- (Paraguay) Francisco Arce
- (Peru) Alberto Gallardo
- (Uruguay) Segundo Villadóniga

== Others ==
- (Brazil) Agnaldo Liz
- (Brazil) Cleiton Xavier
- (Brazil) Dudu
- (Brazil) Ernesto Imparato
- (Brazil) Felipe Melo
- (Brazil) Fernando Prass
- (Brazil) Gabriel Jesus currently playing for (England) Arsenal
- (Brazil) Gérson Caçapa
- (Brazil) Lopes Tigrão
- (Brazil) Jailson
- (Brazil) João Carlos
- (Brazil) Marcos Assunção
- (Brazil) Moisés currently playing for (China) Shandong Luneng
- (Brazil) Pedrinho Vicençote
- (Brazil) Pires
- (Brazil) Ricardo Boiadeiro
- (Brazil) Richard Petrocelli
- (Brazil) Rocha
- (Brazil) Toninho Cecílio
- (Brazil) Vitor Hugo
- (Brazil) Weverton
- (Brazil) Willian Bigode
- (Brazil) Zé Carlos
- (Brazil) Zé Roberto
- (Argentina) Jonatan Cristaldo currently playing for (Argentina) Newell's Old Boys
- (Chile) Jorge Valdivia
- (Colombia) Faustino Asprilla
- (Colombia) Yerry Mina currently playing for (Italy) A.C.F. Fiorentina
- (Paraguay) Gustavo Gómez
- (Paraguay) Pérez
- (Paraguay) Roberto Fernández
- (Uruguay) Víctor Diogo
