= Edu Bala =

Brazilian footballer (born 1948)

Personal information
- Full name: Carlos Eduardo da Silva
- Date of birth: 20 October 1948 (age 78)
- Place of birth: São Paulo, Brazil
- Height: 1.82 m (6 ft 0 in)
- Position: Right winger

Youth career
- 1963–1966: Portuguesa

Senior career*
| Years | Team | Apps | (Gls) |
| 1967–1969 | Portuguesa | | |
| 1969–1978 | Palmeiras | 482 | (85) |
| 1978–1980 | São Paulo | 148 | (14) |
| 1980 | Sport Recife | | |
| 1981–1982 | Universidad Católica | | |
| 1982–1983 | Santa Cruz-PE | | |
| 1983 | Nacional-SP | | |
| 1984 | Caldense | | |
| 1984–1986 | Desportiva-ES | | |
| 1986 | Nacional-SP | | |
| 1986 | Uberaba | | |
| 1987 | Marcílio Dias | | |
| 1987–1988 | Saltense | | |
| 1989 | Sãocarlense | | |
| 1989 | Marcílio Dias | | |

International career
| 1976 | Brazil | 4 | (0) |
- * Club domestic league appearances and goals

Carlos Eduardo da Silva (born 20 October 1948), better known as Edu Bala, is a Brazilian former professional footballer who played as a right winger.

== Club career ==
Edu started his career at Portuguesa de Desportos, but it was at Palmeiras where he won most of his titles, being part of the squad known as "Segunda Academia". In 1978, after problems renewing his contract, he was brought to São Paulo FC, where he won the 1980 Campeonato Paulista. In the same year he was also Pernambuco champion for Sport.

== International career ==
Edu had four official appearances for Brazil, all in 1976, in friendly matches.

== Honours ==
Palmeiras

- Campeonato Brasileiro: 1969, 1972, 1973
- Campeonato Paulista: 1972, 1974, 1976
- Torneio Laudo Natel: 1972
- Ramón de Carranza Trophy: 1974, 1975

São Paulo

- Campeonato Paulista: 1980

Sport

- Campeonato Pernambucano: 1980

Desportiva

- Campeonato Capixaba: 1986

Sãocarlense

- Campeonato Paulista Série A3: 1989
