= Ademir da Guia =

Brazilian footballer and politician (born 1942)

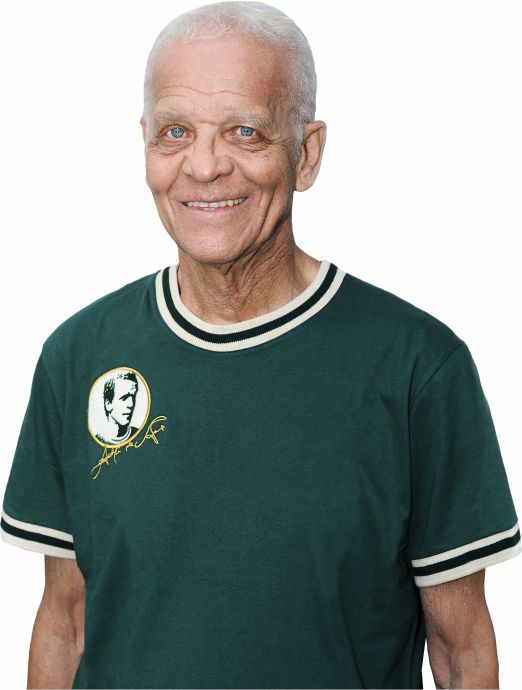
- Ademir da Guia (2018)

Personal information
- Full name: Ademir da Guia
- Date of birth: 3 April 1942 (age 84)
- Place of birth: Rio de Janeiro, Brazil
- Height: 1.80 m (5 ft 11 in)
- Position: Attacking midfielder

Youth career
- 1952–1956: Ceres
- 1956–1960: Bangu

Senior career*
| Years | Team | Apps | (Gls) |
| 1960–1961 | Bangu | 11 | (0) |
| 1961–1977 | Palmeiras | 366 | (60) |
| Total | | 377 | (60) |

International career
| 1965–1974 | Brazil | 9 | (0) |
- * Club domestic league appearances and goals

Ademir da Guia (born 3 April 1942) is a retired professional footballer who played as a midfielder during the 1960s and 1970s for Palmeiras, a leading association football team in Brazil, where he is still regarded as one of the club's all-time best players. Usually a playmaker, he was known for his fantastic close control and passing ability. He was nicknamed O Divino, which means The Divine One, the same nickname given to his father, Domingos da Guia.

== Personal life ==
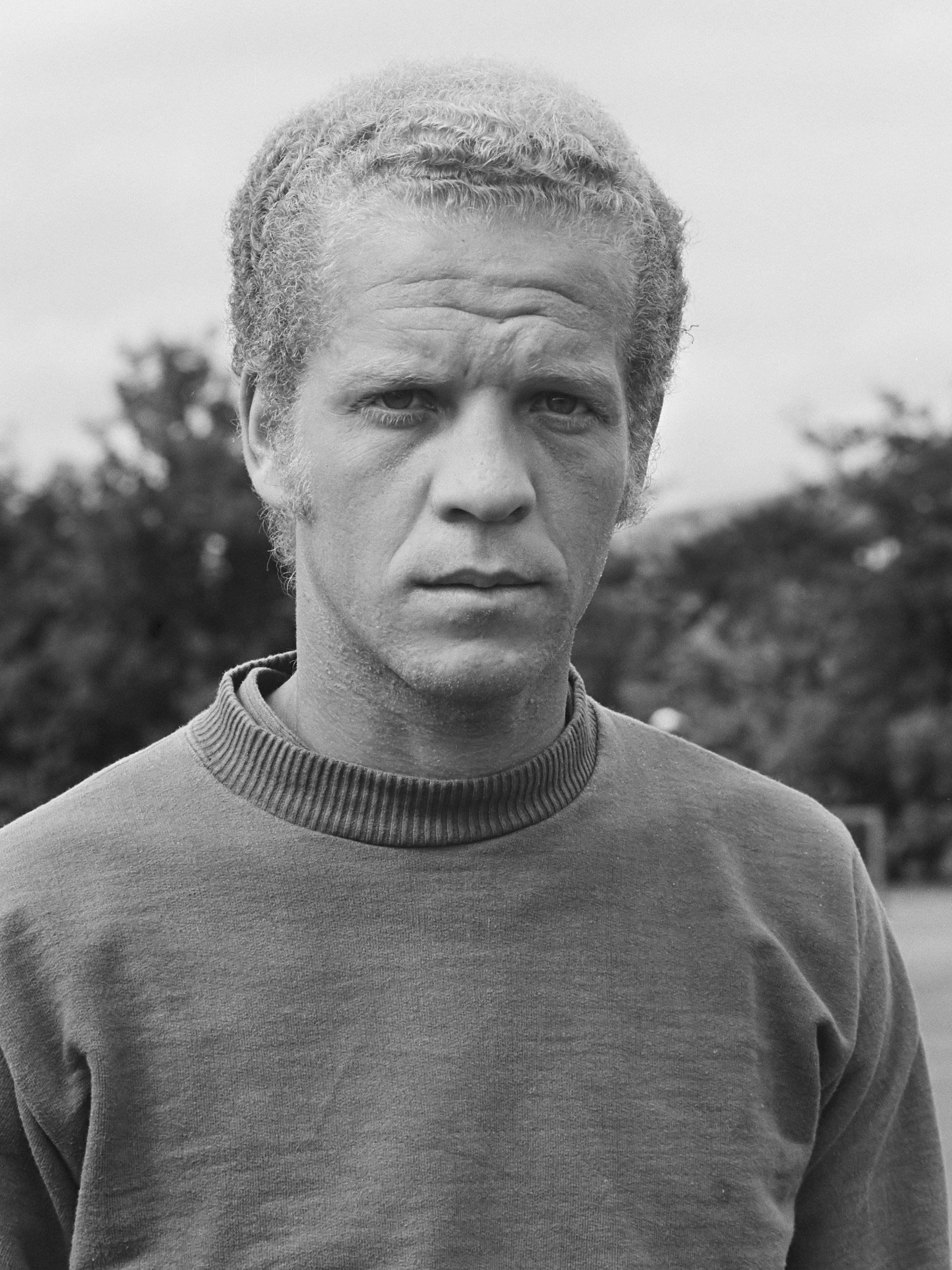
Ademir da Guia in 1974.

Da Guia was born in Rio de Janeiro. His father, Domingos da Guia was a former national team member who played at the 1938 FIFA World Cup. His uncle, Ladislau da Guia, had pursued the same career path at an earlier stage, playing for Bangu Atlético Clube, and becoming their all-time best scorer with 215 goals.

== Career ==
In the 16 years Ademir da Guia spent playing for Palmeiras, he holds the record for the most appearances for the club and is the third best goalscorer ever, and won, amongst other titles, both the Campeonato Paulista and the Campeonato Brasileiro Série A five times.

Unlike many distinguished football players in his country, Ademir did not have a prolonged and constant participation with the Brazil national team; playing in nine matches for Brazil in the total, the first six in 1965 and the other three in 1974, including at the 1974 FIFA World Cup when he got the chance to play in the match for third place against Poland (in which Brazil was defeated by 1–0). His lack of playing time was the result of being contemporary of such players as Pelé, Rivellino, Gérson, Tostão, Dirceu Lopes and Paulo César.

Da Guia played his farewell match on 18 September 1977 at Estádio do Morumbi, São Paulo in a Campeonato Paulista match between his club Palmeiras and Corinthians, which the latter won 2–0.

== Political career ==
He was elected in 2004 for the legislative period of 2005–2008 as councilman for the city of São Paulo as a member of the Communist Party of Brazil, joining the Liberal Party later.

== Honours ==
Bangu

- International Soccer League: 1960

Palmeiras

- Campeonato Paulista: 1963, 1966, 1972, 1974, 1976
- Torneio Rio-São Paulo: 1965
- Campeonato Brasileiro Série A: 1967 (TB), 1967 (TRGP), 1969, 1972, 1973
- Laudo Natel Tournament: 1972
- Copa Libertadores runner-up: 1968

Individual

- Campeonato Paulista Best Player: 1966
- Bola de Prata: 1972
- Troféu Arthur Friedenreich Best Midfilder: 1970, 1972, 1974
