= Émerson Leão =

Brazilian footballer and manager

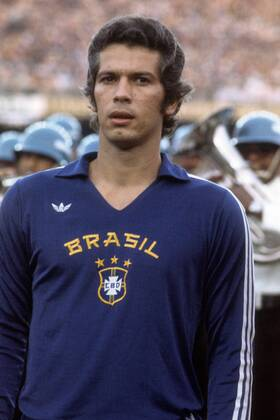
- Leão in 1979

Personal information
- Full name: Émerson Leão
- Date of birth: 11 July 1949 (age 77)
- Place of birth: Ribeirão Preto, Brazil
- Height: 1.84 m (6 ft 1/2 in)
- Position: Goalkeeper

Senior career*
Years	Team	Apps	(Gls)
1968–1970	Comercial		
1971–1978	Palmeiras	163	(0)
1978–1980	Vasco da Gama	24	(0)
1981–1982	Grêmio	46	(0)
1983	Corinthians	13	(0)
1984–1986	Palmeiras	31	(0)
1987	Sport Recife	30	(0)
Total		277	(0)

International career
1970–1986	Brazil	80	(0)

Managerial career
- 1987–1988: Sport Recife
- 1988–1989: Coritiba
- 1989–1990: Palmeiras
- 1990–1992: Portuguesa
- 1990–1991: São José
- 1991–1992: XV de Piracicaba
- 1992–1994: Shimizu S-Pulse
- 1995–1996: Juventude
- 1996: Atlético Paranaense
- 1996: Verdy Kawasaki
- 1997–1998: Atlético Mineiro
- 1998–1999: Santos
- 1999: Internacional
- 2000: Grêmio
- 2000: Sport Recife
- 2000–2001: Brazil
- 2002–2004: Santos
- 2004: Cruzeiro
- 2004–2005: São Paulo
- 2005: Vissel Kobe
- 2005–2006: Palmeiras
- 2006: São Caetano
- 2006–2007: Corinthians
- 2007: Atlético Mineiro
- 2008: Santos
- 2008–2009: Al-Sadd
- 2009: Atlético Mineiro
- 2009: Sport Recife
- 2010: Goiás
- 2011–2012: São Paulo
- 2012: São Caetano
Medal record
Men's Football
Representing Brazil
FIFA World Cup
Winner	1970 Mexico
Third place	1978 Argentina
Copa América
Runner-up	1983
Third place	1979
- * Club domestic league appearances and goals

Émerson Leão (Portuguese pronunciation: [ˈɛmeʁsõ leˈɐ̃w]; born 11 July 1949) is a Brazilian former football goalkeeper and manager. He is regarded by pundits as one of the best Brazilian goalkeepers of all time. A documentary video produced by FIFA, FIFA Fever, called him the third-most impressive defense player of all time. He was born in Ribeirão Preto, São Paulo.

== Playing career ==
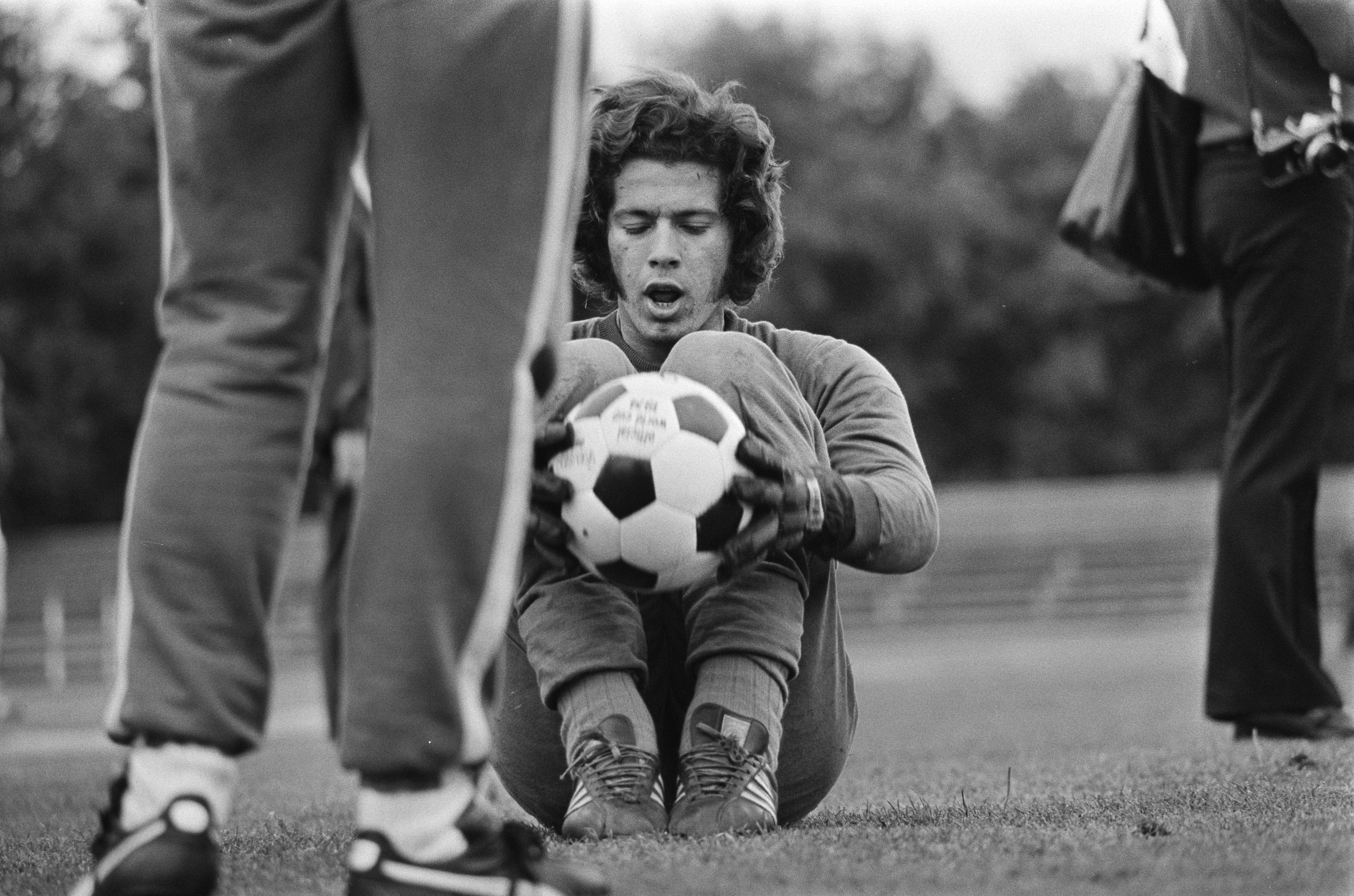
Leão training during the 1974 World Cup

He was a FIFA World Cup champion in 1970 as a reserve player, at age 20. He then played the two following World Cups as first team player. He was the first Brazilian goalkeeper in history to be team captain (during the 1978 World Cup). Dida repeated the feat in 2006 in a group stage match against Japan. In the 1986 World Cup, Leão was a reserve player.

He played 80 times for the Brazil national football team. At club level, he played for several clubs, his longest term being at Palmeiras, where he won several titles, like Campeonato Brasileiro and Campeonato Paulista.

== Managerial career ==
Leão has been a manager since 1987. He was São Paulo manager in 2005, winning the Campeonato Paulista of that year. He then moved to Vissel Kobe of Japan, where he stayed for only four matches. On 18 July 2005, he became the manager of Palmeiras, a position he held until March 2006. His peak as a manager was his second stint with Santos, between 2002 and 2004, when he won the Campeonato Brasileiro in 2002, and was runner-up in both Copa Libertadores de América and Campeonato Brasileiro in 2003. Leão is often seen as a hardliner, since he demands perfect physical shape of his players, along with discipline and mutual respect. He is not fond of having well-known players on his teams, since he believes that this might cause relationship problems within the squad.

He was the manager of the Brazil national team from 15 November 2000 until 9 June 2001. From 11 matches, his Brazil side won 4, drew 4 and lost 3. Like his predecessor Vanderlei Luxemburgo, he struggled to have top players available for qualifying matches. He tried to centre the squad around Romário and younger players with little international experience. He also became the first sitting coach to travel to Europe to assess his players' activities there, where he was asked by the Europeans to not release Rivaldo and Roberto Carlos for matches that were not crucial.

Leão was dismissed by Atlético Mineiro on 4 May 2009. On 3 June 2009, Sport Recife signed the coach for the 2009 Brasileirão championship. On 26 April 2010, Leão was named as the new manager of Goiás. On 24 October 2011, São Paulo announced it had hired Leão for a second managerial spell in charge of the club.

On 30 August 2012, after two months unattached, Leão was hired by São Caetano, then participating in Série B.

== Controversies ==
Leão is known for his controversial attitudes and declarations.

In 1997, after a game between his Atlético Mineiro and Argentine side Lanús in the Conmebol Cup final, Leão was involved in a massive fight with adversaries. Leão had to rebuild his face after the incident.

In 2002, when he coached Santos, and Peixe faced Paysandu, Leão was involved again in a fight. This time, when his players faced policemen, the coach received an aggression in his eyes by a pepper spray.

In 2006, then coaching Palmeiras, Leão had problems with television pundit Milton Neves, who had kicked another television pundit, Sílvio Luiz, according to Leão. Leão said to Neves: "When you kicked Silvio Luiz's ass, a 70-year-old man, you boasted. Come to kick mine!"

In 2010, training Goiás, Leão discussed again with two another television pundits, Renata Fan and Neto. According to Leão, Neto "would not have psychological conditions to speak in a television channel". But the problems between them would happen since 1989, when Leão coached Neto in Palmeiras.

In 2013, in a research made by sports site UOL Esporte, Leão was elected the worst coach from Brazil. He had 16 votes. Celso Roth was chosen the second one.

Again in 2013, Leão said that Juvenal Juvêncio, president of São Paulo, club that he coached for two times (between 2004 and 2005 and, after, between 2011 and 2012), should abdicate due to his old age, just like Pope Benedict XVI. Juvêncio answered to Leão, saying that the coach "needs to find another job soon".

== Career statistics ==
=== Club ===
Club performance			League	
Season	Club	League	Apps	Goals
Brazil			League	
1971	Palmeiras	Série A	24	0
1972	Palmeiras	Série A	26	0
1973	Palmeiras	Série A	36	0
1974	Palmeiras	Série A	0	0
1975	Palmeiras	Série A	26	0
1976	Palmeiras	Série A	21	0
1977	Palmeiras	Série A	18	0
1978	Palmeiras	Série A	12	0
1979	Vasco da Gama	Série A	14	0
1980	Vasco da Gama	Série A	10	0
1981	Grêmio	Série A	23	0
1982	Grêmio	Série A	23	0
1983	Corinthians	Série A	13	0
1984	Palmeiras	Série A	14	0
1985	Palmeiras	Série A	17	0
1986	Sport Recife	Série A	0	0
Country	Brazil		277	0
Total			277	0

=== International ===
Brazil national team
Year	Apps	Goals
1970	2	0
1972	4	0
1973	5	0
1974	15	0
1976	5	0
1977	13	0
1978	12	0
1979	8	0
1983	14	0
1986	2	0
Total	80	0

=== Managerial ===
Team	From	To	Record				
Team	From	To	G	W	D	L	Win %
Shimizu S-Pulse	1993	1994	58	40	0	18	68.97
Verdy Kawasaki	1996	1996	18	13	0	5	72.22
Vissel Kobe	2005	2005	4	1	1	2	25.00
Total			80	54	1	25	67.50

== Honours ==
=== Player ===
Club
Palmeiras

- Campeonato Brasileiro: 1969, 1972, 1973; Runner-up: 1970, 1978
- Campeonato Paulista: 1972, 1974, 1976; Runner-up: 1969, 1970, 1971, 1973, 1986
- Copa Libertadores Semi-Final: 1971

Vasco

- Campeonato Brasileiro Runner-up: 1979
- Campeonato Carioca Runner-up: 1979, 1980

Grêmio

- Campeonato Gaúcho: 1980; Runner-up: 1981, 1982
- Campeonato Brasileiro: 1981; Runner-up: 1982

Corinthians

- Campeonato Paulista: 1983

Brazil

- FIFA World Cup: 1970
- Independence Cup: 1972
- Copa América runner-up: 1983

=== Individual ===
- Bola de Prata Best Goalkeeper: 1972
- Campeonato Paulista Best Goalkeeper: 1972, 1974, 1976
- FIFA XI: 1979
- IFFHS Brazilian Best Goalkeeper of XX Century: 2º
- IFFHS Brazil All Times Dream Team (Team C): 2021

=== Manager ===
Sport

- 1987 – Copa União Yellow Module
- 2000 – Campeonato Pernambucano

Shimizu S Pulse

- 1992 – Kanagawa Cup

Verdy Kawasaki

- 1996 – Emperor's Cup

Atlético Mineiro

- 1997 – Copa Conmebol

Santos

- 1998 – Copa Conmebol
- 2002 – Campeonato Brasileiro

São Paulo

- 2005 – Campeonato Paulista

== See also ==
- List of football managers with the most matches
- List of Brazil national football team managers
