= Pio (footballer, born 1945) =

Brazilian footballer (born 1945)

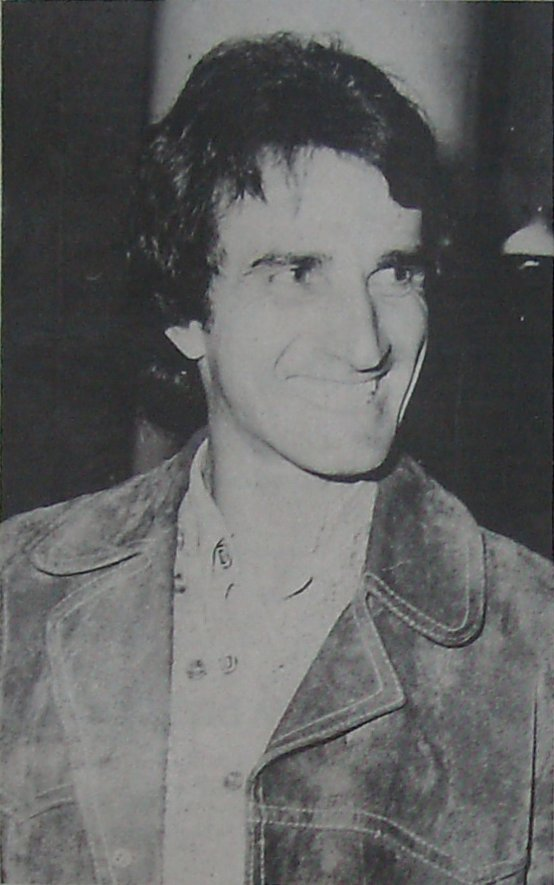
- Pio in 1978

Personal information
- Full name: Osmar Alberto Volpe
- Date of birth: 15 November 1945 (age 80)
- Place of birth: Araraquara, São Paulo, Brazil
- Position: Left winger

Senior career*
| Years | Team | Apps | (Gls) |
| 1964–1969 | Ferroviária | | |
| 1969–1973 | Palmeiras | 188 | (9) |
| 1974–1977 | Santa Cruz | | |
| 1977–1978 | Colorado | | |
| 1979–1981 | Sãocarlense | | |
| 1981–1982 | Novorizontino | | |
- * Club domestic league appearances and goals

Osmar Alberto Volpe (born 15 November 1945), more commonly known as just Pio, is a retired Brazilian footballer and professor. He played as a left winger for various clubs throughout the 1970s, notably playing for Palmeiras during their dynasty of the early 1970s. He was also a torch bearer en route for the 2016 Summer Olympics in his home city of Araraquara.

== Career ==
Pio was born on 15 November 1945 at Araraquara as the son of Miguel Volpe Neto and Judith Martins Volpe. During his youth career, he played for Araraquara and Santana, both clubs pertaining to his hometown. Known as a great free kick taker, Pio started playing for Ferroviária in 1964 as he would experience his first professional games but soon had to serve in the Presidential Guard Battalion in 1965. Around this time, the club had been relegated to the second division of the Campeonato Paulista, actively fighting in a campaign to return to play in the top-flight of Brazilian football. With Pio's return and help, the club was not only promoted in 1966 but was three-time champion of the Campeonato Paulista do Interior de Futebol with this being the highest era of success for Ferroviária.

His performances at the club would atrract Palmeiras in 1969 and began playing for the Verdão between 1969 and 1973. He would immediately experience his first victory with the club during the 1969 Campeonato Brasileiro Série A where the club would become champions. Three years later, he was a part of the "perfect season" of Palmeiras where not only would the club win the 1972 Campeonato Brasileiro Série A but they would also earn titles in the annual editions of the 1972 Campeonato Paulista but would also win the Torneio de Mar Del Plata, the Torneio Laudo Natel and the Taça dos Invictos. He would also primarily play alongside Zé Carlos to either score goals or perform assists. However, Pio's success within the club would come to a decline following the purchase of a factory in 1971. With no business acumen, he would later learn that the company he had acquired was mired in debt with his salary with Palmeiras being insufficient to pay the increasingly difficult financial difficulties. This would result in his play being increasingly more desperate and cautious as well as frequently arguing with his teammates. This would result in a serious injury during a match and losing his place in the Starting XI, being replaced with Nei resulting in him being transferred to Santa Cruz in 1974 as a part of the club also seeking Palmeiras goalkeeper Raul Marcel. In total, he would play in 188 matches with 29 goals being scored.

During his first season with the club, by chance, he would soon face his old club of Palmeiras during the 1975 Campeonato Brasileiro Série A with Pio being a part of a comeback that ended 3–2 through a free kick. During the semi-finals, Santa Cruz would be eliminated by Cruzeiro, ending in a respectable fourth place which would be the club's best performance in the Campeonato Brasileiro Série A. Following the club becoming champions in the 1976 Campeonato Pernambucano where he was considered the club's best player in the competition, he would leave the club in 1977 following disagreements with manager Evaristo de Macedo despite being a fan-favorite. This would lead him to play for Colorado mid-season. He would return to play within São Paulo as he would sign for Sãocarlense in 1979. His final club would be for Novorizontino in 1981 before retiring in 1982.

== Later career ==
Following his football career, Pio would later get married. Pio would hold the honor of carrying the Olympic torch in Araraquara for its route to Rio de Janeiro before the 2016 Summer Olympics. He is currently a professor of Physical Education at São Paulo State University.
