= Zeca (footballer, born 1946) =

Brazilian footballer (born 1946)

Personal information
- Full name: Jose Luiz Ferreira Rodrigues
- Date of birth: July 6, 1946 (age 80)
- Place of birth: Porto Alegre, Brazil
- Position: Defender

Senior career*
Years	Team	Apps	(Gls)
1969–1977	Palmeiras	389	(7)

Managerial career
- 2000: Kawasaki Frontale
- * Club domestic league appearances and goals

Jose Luiz Ferreira Rodrigues (born July 6, 1946) is a Brazilian former football player and manager.

== Coaching career ==
In 1997, Zeca signed with Japan Football League club Kawasaki Frontale and became a goalkeeper coach. In 1999, the club joined new league J2 League and won the champions. He also managed one game as caretaker in J.League Cup in April. In 2000, the club was promoted to J1 League and he became a new manager. However the club won only two matches in first ten matches and he was sacked in May.

== Managerial statistics ==
Team	From	To	Record				
Team	From	To	G	W	D	L	Win %
Kawasaki Frontale	2000	2000	10	2	1	7	20.00
Total			10	2	1	7	20.00

== Honours ==
Palmeiras

- Campeonato Brasileiro Série A: 1969, 1972, 1973
- Campeonato Paulista: 1972, 1974
