= João Carlos (footballer, born 1947) =

Brazilian footballer (1947–2020)

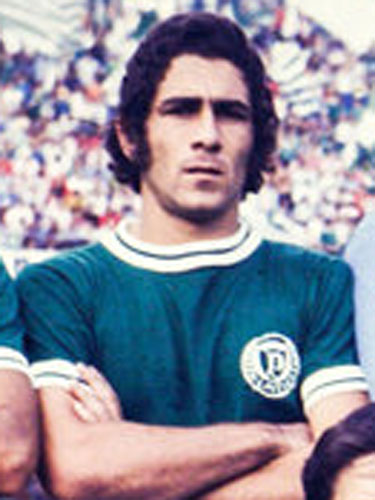
- João Carlos in 1972

Personal information
- Full name: João Carlos Rodrigues
- Date of birth: 23 June 1947
- Place of birth: Santos, São Paulo, Brazil
- Date of death: 25 February 2020 (aged 72)
- Place of death: Santos, São Paulo, Brazil
- Position: Defender

Senior career*
Years	Team	Apps	(Gls)
1965–1971	Portuguesa Santista		
1972–1976	Palmeiras	123	(0)
1977	Juventus da Mooca		
1978–1979	Portuguesa Santista		
- * Club domestic league appearances and goals

João Carlos Rodrigues (23 June 1947 – 25 February 2020), more commonly known as simply João Carlos was a Brazilian footballer. He played as a defender for Portuguesa Santista and Palmeiras throughout the late 1960s and 1970s. He would also be part of the Palmeiras dynasty that achieved several titles of the Campeonato Paulista and the Campeonato Brasileiro throughout the early to mid 1970s.

== Career ==
Born in Baixada Santista of Santos, São Paulo, João Carlos would begin his career by playing for Portuguesa Santista in 1965, playing alongside Marco Antônio in 1968. Due to his impressive performance with the club, he would attract the interest of the major clubs of São Paulo before he would sign with Palmeiras with his first match being a friendly in a 0–3 against Maringá on 10 May. Immediately, he would be a part of the winning squad for the 1972 Campeonato Brasileiro Série A and the 1972 Campeonato Paulista. Over the course of the next four years with the club, he would win the 1973 Campeonato Brasileiro Série A and the 1974 and 1976 Campeonato Paulista with his last match being a 1–1 draw against XV de Piracicaba. Following this success, he would have brief stints for Juventus da Mooca in 1977 and Portuguesa Santista in 1978 and 1979 until his retirement from professional football.
