= Fedato (footballer) =

Brazilian footballer (born 1947)

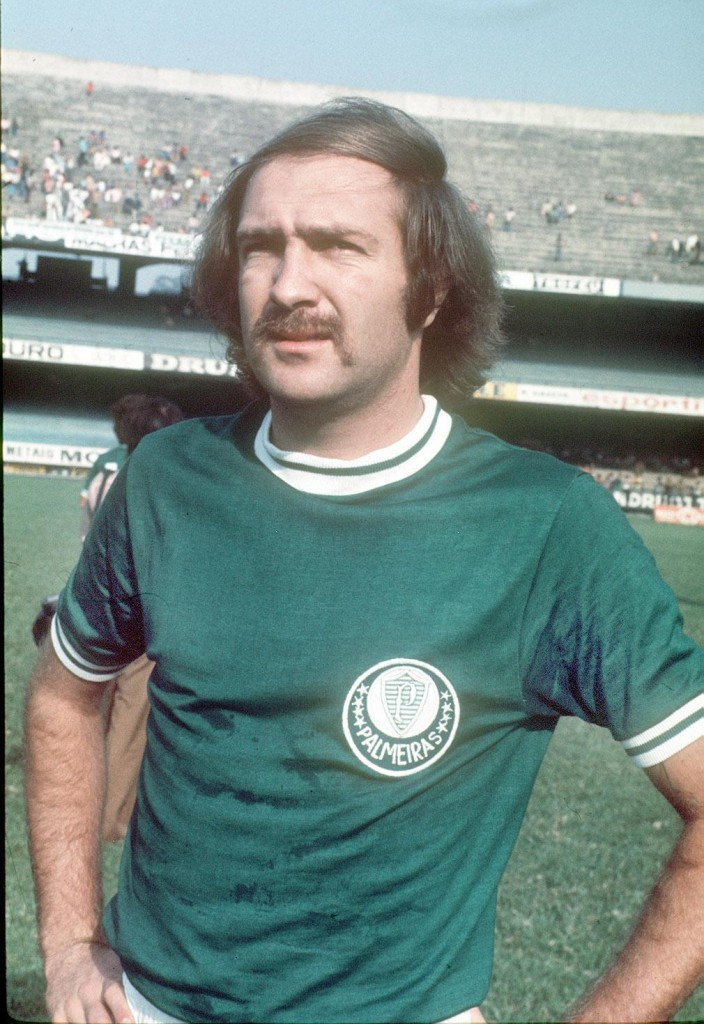

Personal information
- Full name: Antônio Carlos Fedato
- Date of birth: 18 November 1948
- Place of birth: São Caetano do Sul, São Paulo, Brazil
- Date of death: 26 January 2000 (aged 51)
- Place of death: São Caetano do Sul, São Paulo, Brazil
- Position: Center forward

Youth career
- 1965–1966: Palmeiras

Senior career*
Years	Team	Apps	(Gls)
1967–1968	Nacional		
1969	Botafogo-SP		
1969	Comercial		
1970	Noroeste		
1970–1975	Palmeiras	269	(61)
1976	Náutico		
- * Club domestic league appearances and goals

Antônio Carlos Fedato, more commonly known as simply Fedato (18 November 1948 – 26 January 2000) was a Brazilian footballer. Nicknamed "Talismã" primarily played as a center forward but was known for his versatility as he could also play in several other positions. He was also known for his unique experience as despite rarely making the starting XI for the clubs he played for, he was consistently used as an effective substitute within the second phase of a match. He was known for being part of the Palmeiras dynasty throughout the 1970s, winning several titles.

== Club career ==
Fedato began his career by playing for the Palmeiras youth sector in 1965 after being discovered by Mário Travaglini during a game with his hometown club of Cerâmica Clube. He began his senior career with Nacional for the 1967 and 1968 seasons. At the beginning of the 1969 season, he played for both Botafogo-SP and Comercial before having a solid spell with Noroeste at the beginning of the 1970 season. He would then experience his career highlight as Palmeiras would sign him as they sought a player who, without any embarrassment, occupied the condition of "first reserve". Fedato would meet this criterion because he had the facility to play both on the wings and in command of the attack, going as far to replace some of the talented members of the Second Academy. It would be when he entered mid-game that Fedato would get to shine the most as the clubs "secret weapin" as there were countless times in which, thanks to his entry into the field, Palmeiras managed to win a game that seemed initially impossible to recover from. This would make him a club icon as fans nicknamed him as the best Talismã in the history of the Alviverde.

During the next five years, he would be a part of the Palmeiras dynasty that won the 1972 and 1974 Campeonato Paulista as well as the 1972 and 1973 Campeonato Brasileiro Série A, earning the 1974 and 1975 Ramón de Carranza Trophies due to his contributions as he would play in 269 games with 61 goals by the time of his departure from the club. He would then briefly play for Capibaribe in the 1976 season before shortly ending his career as a player and moving on to a managerial career where he would coach for Palestra Itália, initially as the youth coach before moving on to the senior team where he would manage for 79 matches within three seasons. He would also manage his club of Palmeiras in the 1980s.

== International career ==
Fedato would be called up to play in the Brazil Independence Cup but he would ultimately choose not to participate in the tournament.

== Death ==
On 26 January 2000, during a routine cardiological examination, Fedato suffered a fatal heart attack before dying at 51 years of age.
