= Zé Carlos (footballer, born 1947) =

Brazilian footballer (born 1947)

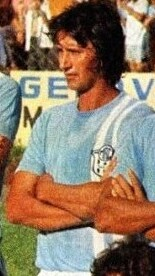
- Zé Carlos in 1975

Personal information
- Full name: José Carlos dos Santos
- Date of birth: 28 September 1947 (age 79)
- Place of birth: Catanduva, São Paulo, Brazil
- Position: Defensive midfielder

Youth career
- 1966–1967: Palmeiras

Senior career*
| Years | Team | Apps | (Gls) |
| 1968 | Comercial | | |
| 1969–1974 | Palmeiras | 116 | (1) |
| 1975 | Marília | | |
- * Club domestic league appearances and goals

José Carlos dos Santos (born 28 September 1947), more commonly known as Zé Carlos is a Brazilian retired footballer. He played as a defensive midfielder for Palmeiras throughout the 1970s, being a part of the football dynasty that is associated with the club.

== Career ==
Zé Carlos began his career as a footballer for Palmeiras youth before beginning his career with Comercial in 1968. He would then play for the senior Palmeiras team beginning in 1969 as he would score one of two winning goals to win the 1969 Ramón de Carranza Trophy. He was known for his speed as he met the expectations club manager Osvaldo Brandão, typically playing as a reserve for Dudu as well as for other footballers.

Over the course of his career with Palmeiras, he would play in 116 matches with 61 victories, 34 draws and 21 losses. He would also be part of the winning squads for the 1969, the 1972 and the 1973 Campeonato Brasileiro Série A as well as the 1972 Campeonato Paulista. He would then play for Marília for a single season in 1975 before retiring that same year.
