= Ronaldo Drummond =

Brazilian footballer (1946–2020)

Ronaldo
Personal information
- Full name: Ronaldo Gonçalves Drummond
- Date of birth: 21 August 1946
- Place of birth: Belo Horizonte, Brazil
- Date of death: 9 June 2020 (aged 73)
- Place of death: Belo Horizonte, Brazil
- Height: 1.75 m (5 ft 9 in)
- Position: Forward

Youth career
- Atlético Mineiro

Senior career*
Years	Team	Apps	(Gls)
1964–1972	Atlético Mineiro	270	(67)
1972–1975	Palmeiras	185	(31)
1975	Santos		
1976–1979	Cruzeiro	22	(6)

International career
1968	Brazil	1	(1)
- * Club domestic league appearances and goals

Ronaldo Drummond (21 August 1946 – 8 June 2020), was a Brazilian professional footballer who played as a forward.

== Club career ==
Revealed in the youth categories of Atlético Mineiro, Ronaldo achieved the feat of being champion of the first three official editions of the Brazilian Championship, in 1971 with Atlético and in 1972 and 1973 with Palmeiras, being part of the squad known as the "Second Academy". He was also champion of the Copa Libertadores with Cruzeiro.

== International career ==
Ronaldo played one match for the Brazil national team, on 19 December 1968, when Atlético Mineiro players represented Brazil against Yugoslavia.

== Death ==
Ronaldo died on 8 June 2020, at Vera Cruz Hospital in Belo Horizonte, as a result of a stomach hemorrhage.

== Career statistics ==
=== International ===
Scores and results list Brazil's goal tally first, score column indicates score after each Drummond goal.

List of international goals scored by Ronaldo Drummond
No.	Date	Venue	Opponent	Score	Result	Competition
1	19 December 1968	Mineirão, Belo Horizonte, Brazil	Yugoslavia	3–2	3–2	Friendly

== Honours ==
Atlético Mineiro

- Campeonato Brasileiro: 1971
- Campeonato Mineiro: 1970

Palmeiras

- Campeonato Brasileiro: 1972, 1973
- Campeonato Paulista: 1972, 1974

Cruzeiro

- Copa Libertadores: 1976
- Campeonato Mineiro: 1977
