= Nei (footballer, born 1949) =

Brazilian footballer

Personal information
- Full name: Elias Ferreira Sobrinho
- Date of birth: 15 August 1949 (age 77)
- Place of birth: Nova Europa, Brazil
- Position: Forward

Youth career
- Ferroviária

Senior career*
Years	Team	Apps	(Gls)
1969–1971	Ferroviária		
1972–1980	Palmeiras	490	(70)
1980	Botafogo-SP		
1981–1983	Grêmio Maringá		

International career
1976	Brazil	1	(0)
- * Club domestic league appearances and goals

Elias Ferreira Sobrinho (born 15 August 1949), better known as Nei, is a Brazilian former professional footballer who played as a forward.

== Club career ==
Revealed by Ferroviária, where he played until 1971, Nei became famous playing for Palmeiras in the 1970s, in the team that became known as the "second academy" (Portuguese: segunda academia). He won two Brazilian titles and three state championships, in addition to 490 matches and 70 goals for the club, entering the hall of fame.

== International career ==
Nei participated in a single match for the Brazil national team, on 21 February 1976, against the Soviet Union.

== Honours ==
Palmeiras

- Campeonato Brasileiro: 1972, 1973
- Campeonato Paulista: 1972, 1974, 1976
- Ramón de Carranza Trophy: 1974, 1975
