= César Maluco =

Brazilian footballer (born 1945)

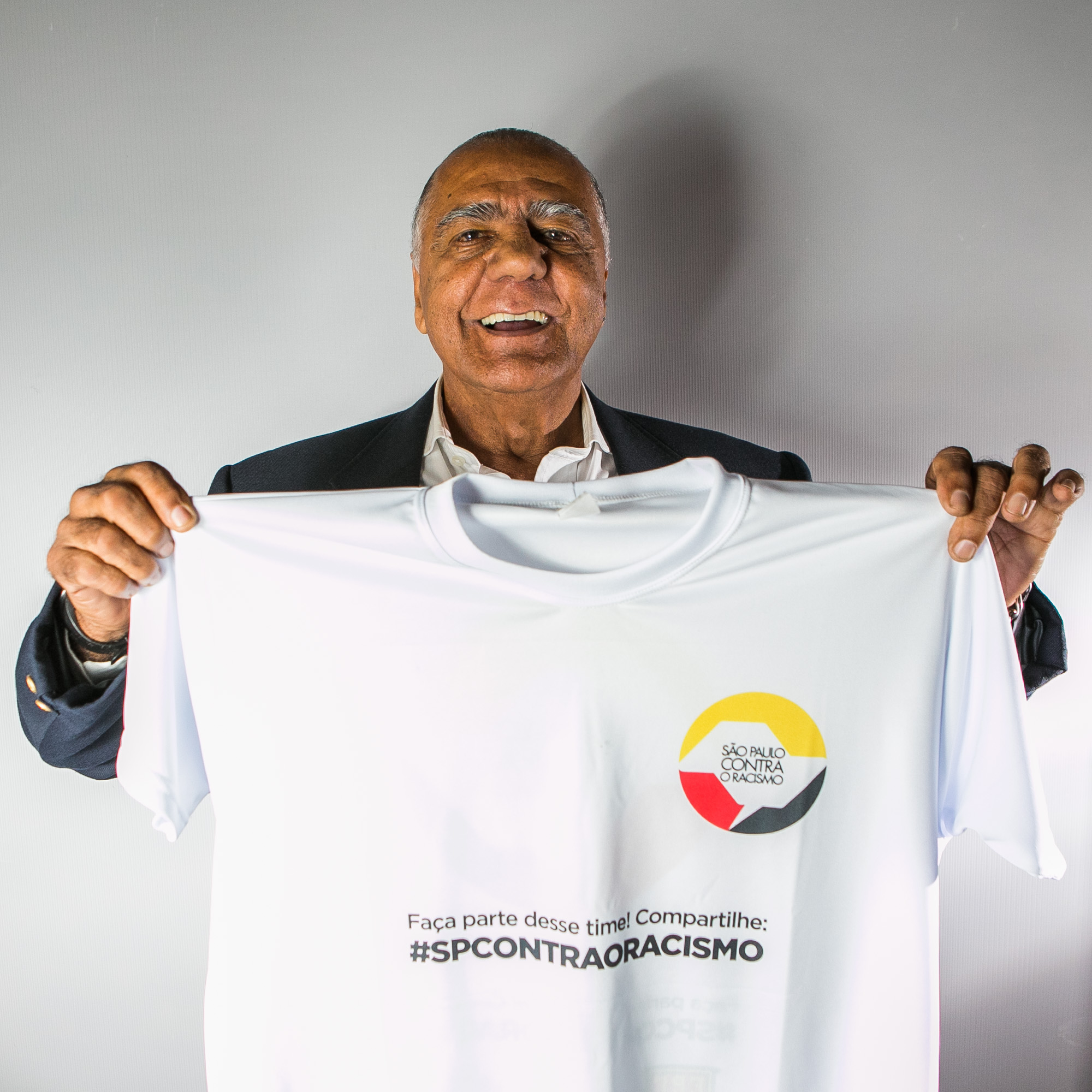

Personal information
- Full name: César Augusto da Silva Lemos
- Date of birth: 17 May 1945 (age 81)
- Place of birth: Rio de Janeiro, Brazil
- Height: 1.80 m (5 ft 11 in)
- Position: Striker

Youth career
- Flamengo

Senior career*
Years	Team	Apps	(Gls)
1964–1968	Flamengo	59	(14)
1967	→ Palmeiras		
1968–1975	Palmeiras	26	(21)
1975	Corinthians	4	(0)
1976	Santos	-	(-)
1977	Fluminense	3	(0)
1978	Botafogo-SP	-	(-)
1979	Rio Negro	-	(-)
1980	Universidad de Chile	-	(-)
1980–1981	Aris	-	(-)

International career
1968–1974	Brazil	8	(0)
- * Club domestic league appearances and goals

César Augusto da Silva Lemos, usually called César Maluco or just César, (born 17 May 1945, Niterói) is a former Brazilian footballer who played as a forward. He was included in the 1974 FIFA World Cup squad of the Brazil national team. He played for Palmeiras.

== Career ==
Born in Niterói, César began playing youth football with local sides Canto do Rio and Flamengo. Palmeiras manager, Aymoré Moreira took César to the club on loan in 1967. That year, he played for Palmeiras in the Torneio Roberto Gomes Pedrosa, scoring 15 goals as the club won the title.

== Personal life ==
César Maluco's brothers, Caio Cambalhota and Luisinho Lemos, were also professional footballers. However, César was the only one of the brothers to play for the Brazil national team.

== Honours ==
Flamengo

- Campeonato Carioca: 1965

Palmeiras

- Campeonato Brasileiro Série A: 1967 (TB), 1967 (TRGP), 1969, 1972, 1973
- Campeonato Paulista: 1972, 1974
