= Dudu (footballer, born 1939) =

Brazilian footballer (1939–2024)

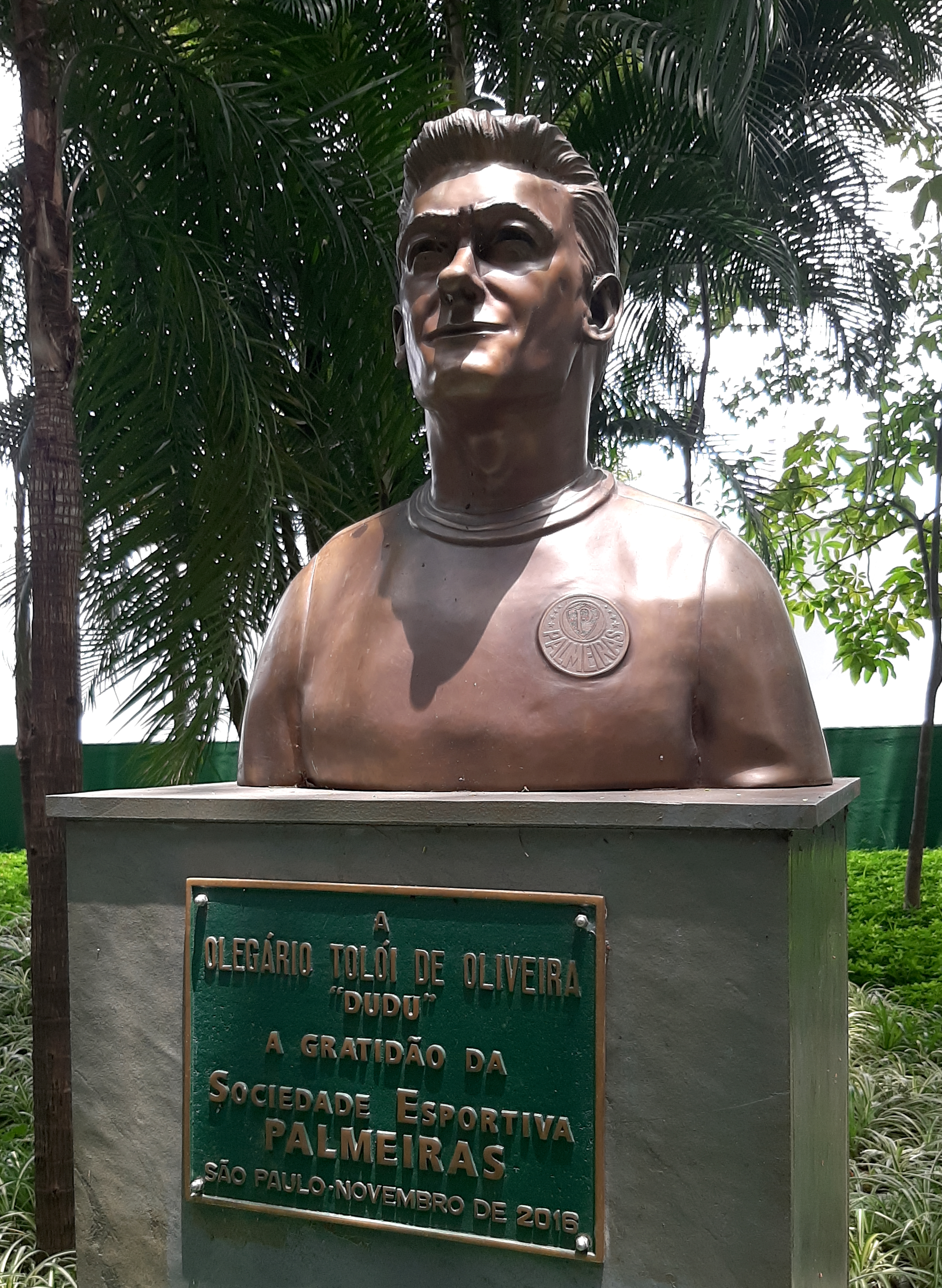
- Bust of Dudu at Allianz Parque in São Paulo, Brazil

Personal information
- Full name: Olegário Tolóí de Oliveira
- Date of birth: 7 November 1939
- Place of birth: Araraquara, São Paulo, Brazil
- Date of death: 28 June 2024 (aged 84)
- Place of death: São Paulo, Brazil
- Height: 1.72 m (5 ft 8 in)
- Position: Midfielder

Senior career*
Years	Team	Apps	(Gls)
1959–1963	Ferroviária		
1964–1975	Palmeiras		
1975–1976	Sevilla		
1976	Palmeiras		
1978–1979	Confiança		

International career
1965–1968	Brazil	13	(1)

Managerial career
- 1976–1977: Palmeiras
- 1981: Palmeiras
- 1990–1991: Palmeiras
- 1993: Desportiva Ferroviária
- * Club domestic league appearances and goals

Olegário Tolóí de Oliveira (7 November 1939 – 28 June 2024), known as Dudu, was a Brazilian footballer who played as a midfielder for Palmeiras from 1964 to 1976. He also had multiple stints as Palmeiras head coach.

== Personal life and death ==
Dudu died due to an abdominal infection on 28 June 2024, at the age of 84. He was the uncle of former Brazil national team coach Dorival Júnior.

== Honours ==
=== Player ===
Palmeiras

- Campeonato Brasileiro Série A: 1967 (TB), 1967 (TRGP), 1969, 1972, 1973
- Rio-São Paulo Tournament: 1965
- Campeonato Paulista: 1966, 1972, 1974
- Copa Libertadores runner-up: 1968

=== Coach ===
Palmeiras

- Campeonato Paulista: 1976

America-RJ

- Torneio dos Campeões: 1982

Desportiva Capixaba

- Campeonato Capixaba: 1986
