= Minuca =

Minuca may refer to:

- Minuca (crab), genus of crabs belonging to the family Ocypodidae
- Minuca (footballer) (1944–2010), Hermínio Francisco de Oliveira Filho, Brazilian footballer
