= Campeonato Nacional de Clubes (Brazil) =

Defunct Brazilian national championship (1971–1974)

- Organiser(s): CBD
- Founded: 1971
- Abolished: 1974
- Region: Brazil
- Most championships: Palmeiras - 2 titles

The Campeonato Nacional de Clubes (English: National Club Championship) was the official name used by the CBD (forerunner of the current CBF) to designate the national tournament held between 1971 and 1974, when it was officially renamed Copa Brasil. Before 1971, the current Campeonato Brasileiro de Futebol was called Taça de Prata.

== History ==
=== Background ===
Taça Brasil was the first official national competition between football clubs that granted the winner the title of Brazilian champion. Although the competition was set up in 1954 by the CBD (Brazilian Sports Confederation, now the CBF), with the aim of naming the Brazilian champion club of the season, the first edition of the competition could not be held in 1955, since the Brazilian football calendar from 1955 to 1958 had already been approved and could not be changed due to the 1958 World Cup; as a result, the Taça Brasil only started in 1959. However, as there were limited dates, economic restrictions and difficulties with interstate travel and transportation in such a large country, the competition was set up in the most economical way possible. This meant that only the state champions were allowed to participate (one club per state), except in some editions, when a second club was admitted and they faced each other in a big eliminatory system. Despite this national competition, Brazilian football needed a tournament that included the biggest teams in the country and was profitable and attractive to the participating clubs and fans. In 1967, with a better structured Brazil, it was possible to explore a national competition format with more matches.

Cruzeiro's victory in the Taça Brasil in 1966, their first national title, led the CBD to put more ambitious integration plans into practice, as this achievement changed the axis of Brazilian football, which until then had been dominated by teams from São Paulo and Rio de Janeiro. This triumph by a club from Minas Gerais was considered a game-changer, since it was believed that high-level football only existed on the Rio-São Paulo axis, despite Bahia's good performances. Consequently, in 1967, the Torneio Rio-São Paulo was expanded to include clubs from other states and became known by Torneio Roberto Gomes Pedrosa; from its second edition, in 1968, the CBD officially renamed it the Taça de Prata. The Torneio Roberto Gomes Pedrosa, unlike the Taça Brasil, was a nationwide competition with a format that included most of the big clubs from the country's main centers.

The Robertão, as the championship became popularly known, was the first competition to include the main teams in the country. Due to the format, the Robertão instantly pleased the participating clubs, managers and fans (the average attendance per game was more than twenty thousand people), becoming the first national tournament to achieve a winning and profitable formula for its participating teams. In the opinion of journalist, historian and writer Odir Cunha, the change represented an evolution of the Taça Brasil. For some authors, the Torneio Roberto Gomes Pedrosa was a modern football competition with everything required: few powerful participants, the best players in Brazil, great average crowds, high-level matches, credibility and excellent media coverage.

Due to its great popularity in Brazil, the military government saw football as an excellent opportunity to promote ufanism and the idea of national integration, intervening regularly in the sport. In practice, football was included in the ambitious National Integration Plan (PIN). However, not only politicians had an interest in the national championship, but several other social agents realized that they could benefit from the competition.

Placar magazine, which has always adopted a critical stance towards the administration of national football and considered the administrative model used by managers to be outdated, supported the organization of a championship that would bring together the main teams in Brazil and be fully integrated. Consequently, there were proposals to create a national club championship. The first arguments used were related to the expansion of the clubs' market within the country and the greater ease with which a rational calendar could be drawn up. They defended a championship of national proportions as an obligatory stage for the development of Brazilian football, even though this could lead to the bankruptcy of small clubs. With a cover headline that read: "Senhores Dirigentes, Eis o Campeonato Nacional" ("Gentlemen in Charge, Here's the National Championship"), the magazine's journalists introduced some managers (except those linked to the CBD who did not agree to talk to the newspaper) with an ideal calendar, including vacations, space for trips abroad and a rational schedule, in which the clubs would travel in a way that would reduce airfare costs, making the competition economically viable. Placar even debated how television would play a part in the clubs' budgets.

Fluminense's supervisor, Almir de Almeida, highlighted Brazil's territorial dimensions as the obstacle to the creation of a new tournament, arguing that the long journeys and varied climates would have an impact on the teams' preparation; however, he emphasized the technical gains with the total integration of Brazilian football. The president of Atlético Mineiro said that it was the CBD's responsibility to hold the tournament, as "the Robertão is already outdated" since the participating teams were chosen by João Havelange, and a country that was three times world champion should organize a championship to match. Felício Brandi, president of Cruzeiro, said that his team would fight for the Campeonato Nacional. On the other hand, still in Minas Gerais, João Frota, director of Flamengo de Varginha, stated that it would be the end of the small teams. In the south, the directors of Grêmio and Internacional were united in their opposition to the championship on the basis proposed by the magazine. In Bahia, the directors of Vitória were in favor, while those of Bahia thought that the Robertão was the ideal championship and didn't need to be reformulated.

Part of the press took advantage of Placar's critical position to also demonstrate its opinion on the situation of national football. On October 10, 1970, with the article "As derrotas de um futebol sem estrutura" ("The defeats of an unstructured football"), Folha de S. Paulo endorsed Placar's comments and harshly criticized the leaders who were seen as aberrations and incompatible with the dynamics of soccer, boycotting any attempt at organization. The effects of the series published by Placar also ended up reaching Brasilia. On September 24, 1970, the Minister of Education and Culture, Jarbas Passarinho, presented a series of suggestions for reforms in the structure of Brazilian sport to the National Sports Council (CND). Many of the proposals he requested had been in the magazine since its inception. Faced with pressure, the CBD promised a new calendar for 1971.

However, before the start of the new national tournament, the last edition of the Torneio Roberto Gomes Pedrosa took place, whose first round was held on September 6, 1970, with the aim of finding out the best Brazilian football team of the "year of the Brazil's third championship". Some authors consider it to be the most difficult national competition ever held, as Roberto Sander states in his book Taça de Prata de 1970 - O Campeonato Brasileiro mais difícil de todos os tempos. The regulations and the number of participants (seventeen teams) were the same as in the previous two editions. The changes involved only the participants, as Portuguesa were replaced by Ponte Preta, who had excelled in the Campeonato Paulista that year and managed to be included by the CBD, and in Paraná, Atlético Paranaense took Coritiba's place. For Placar, the uninteresting games of the state championships would be left behind with the start of the Taça de Prata (the name by which the tournament became known that year). José Maria de Aquino, in his column in the magazine, said that the competition would be the "right way to go when you want to save the eternal financial deficit" of Brazilian football. On the other hand, Jornal do Brasil treated the Robertão as the most important championship in Brazilian soccer, regretting the fact that no club from Rio de Janeiro had yet won the trophy.

Announced as the greatest tournament of all time, the 1970 Robertão would bring together the twenty best clubs in the country. The criteria used by the CBD to include the teams, the lack of adequate time for the clubs to prepare for the tournament and even the competition's schedule were criticized. However, judging by the first round after the start of the tournament, the large number of classics managed to overshadow the existing problems. Along with the first match, the Bola de Prata was created, along with the Placar ranking. The aim was to bring Brazilian football closer to the great events taking place around the world, with awards similar to the Oscars and the European Golden Shoe.

The unprecedented national title for a club from Rio de Janeiro took place in the fourth and final edition of the Robertão. On December 25, 1970, Placar carried extensive coverage of the finals of the Torneio Roberto Gomes Pedrosa/Taça de Prata and printed the headline "O Flu é o campeão do Brasil! Acabou o Torneio da Bola de Prata" ("Flu is the champion of Brazil! The Torneio da Bola de Prata is over"). Hedyl Valle Júnior's column reviewed the competition, pointing out that the Taça de Prata wasn't bad, but it could have been better.

However, despite its national scope, the Robertão was not seen by some of the press as the real Campeonato Nacional. Teams played up to nineteen matches in a competition spanning just three months. In October 1970, Placar magazine, in its outspoken campaign for a new national tournament that would fully integrate the biggest clubs in the country, published an article entitled "O Robertão é quase um Campeonato Nacional. O Campeonato Nacional é nossa grande solução" ("The Robertão is almost a Campeonato Nacional. The Campeonato Nacional is our great solution"). In this publication, the coaches of some of Brazil's leading teams complained about the lack of financial viability and disorganized travel. In addition, there was a latent discussion about the problems of the scope of the championship, with clubs choosing without criteria.

On the other hand, some of the press, as well as the CBD itself, which declared Fluminense Brazilian champions in its official bulletin in 1971, considered the Robertão to be the real national championship. Jornal do Brasil, which in 1967, after the creation of the Robertão, defended the fact that this championship of national proportions was an important moment in the history of Brazilian football, added: "The hope of better income and higher quality spectacles than those provided by the state championships seemed to be coming true, since the creation of a national championship would rationalize the calendar, even making it possible for foreign clubs to come to Brazil, and would strengthen the Brazilian national team, as players from other centers could be useful to the squad, which had lost the World Cup in 1966 to England." The Jornal dos Sports, as well as Placar itself - despite its demands for a new national competition - considered Fluminense to be the 1970 Brazilian champions.

The development demanded by Placar and other press outlets involved the creation of the Campeonato Nacional de Clubes. The pressure came from journalists, some managers, the Minister of Culture, Jarbas Passarinho and other politicians linked to ARENA. The CBD responded by promising changes to the 1971 calendar, both for the clubs and for the Brazilian national team. New times were being announced.

=== The interventions of the military government and the creation of the Campeonato Nacional de Clubes ===
The apex of the military regime's interventions in national football took place in the 1970s, which began with the Brazilian national team winning its third world title in four editions. This period, which became known as the golden age of Brazilian football, was beneficial to Médici's government. On July 16, 1970, less than a month after Carlos Alberto Torres lifted the Jules Rimet Cup at the Azteca Stadium, the president signed the decree-law that began the National Integration Plan. The project aimed to create a better connection between the different regions of Brazil and to encourage the growth of areas that had previously been isolated; football was also part of this process. Médici didn't hide his appreciation for the sport and tried to portray himself as a stadium fan who would stand in the bleachers with a stereo in his ear; these government manipulations also reached the Brazilian Sports Confederation (CBD). João Havelange, who was president of the organization at the time, acted in line with the government, but was not well appreciated by the military. Faced with allegations of corruption, he began to be watched by the regime and even summoned to testify. Havelange left the CBD in 1975 and was replaced by Admiral Heleno Nunes, who had a strong role in the politics of the military government.

President Médici saw football as an opportunity to put his integration discourse into practice. Along with the agricultural frontier and the construction of the Transamazon highway, the Campeonato Nacional would contribute to this process. Through the Ministry of Culture, the government made the tournament possible with financial aid, since the biggest problem in holding a fully integrated national competition was the high cost of long interstate journeys.

At a meeting held on February 4, 1971, the CBD announced the creation of a new football championship. In practice, according to some historians, what happened was the transformation of the Torneio Roberto Gomes Pedrosa/Taça de Prata into the Campeonato Nacional de Clubes. The Campeonato Nacional de Clubes — Divisão Extra, announced by João Havelange in Rio de Janeiro, was the result of the movement that had developed in 1970 calling for a reorganization of the country's football beyond the interests of the military government. From 1974 onwards, this tournament would be known as the first edition of the Campeonato Brasileiro, excluding the previous version, although it was played under a similar format to the Robertão. In its official bulletins between 1971 and 1975, the CBD placed the editions of the Torneio Roberto Gomes Pedrosa/Taça de Prata on an equality with the editions of the Campeonato Brasileiro, only maintaining the proper names, excluding this information from the 1976 bulletin onwards. Some authors consider that "the history of Brazilian football, from that moment on, was left behind". This new competition came with the proposal of giving direct opportunities to teams from all over the country and, due to the policy that dictated the criteria for choosing participants, there was no need for teams to go through regional championships.

The behind-the-scenes politics within the CBD involved in the development of the new tournament has some key elements. The first was João Havelange's desire to run for the FIFA presidency. He, who already had the votes of the South American federations, could not face political problems within his own country, especially with a government that, in the run-up to the 1970 World Cup, had intervened abruptly in the preparation of the Brazilian national team. He also couldn't displease the presidents of the state federations. Colonel José Guilherme, General Oldenor Maia and Rubem Moreira, presidents of the Minas Gerais, Ceará and Pernambuco federations respectively, had their requests granted: they wanted to strengthen their political capital with the creation of the Campeonato Nacional. In this format, the Northeast would gain two more representatives compared to the number of participants in the Robertão. There were two from Pernambuco (one more than in 1970) and another from Ceará, plus a spot for Bahia. Minas Gerais, which was represented by two clubs, now has three.

In order to resolve the dissatisfaction of the people of Rio Grande do Sul, who were opposed to the idea of creating the Campeonato Nacional since the project was presented by Placar magazine, Havelange promised to increase the number of representatives from the state for the second edition of the championship. The regional tournament controlled by the federations would be given priority in the calendar, with their dates running until August, leaving the Campeonato Nacional just over three months long; in other words, no different from the Robertão.

The Campeonato Nacional de Clubes was divided into the Série Especial and the Divisão de Acesso (also known as the Primeira Divisão). In the Série Especial, twenty clubs were divided into two groups, playing three rounds to determine the champion. Under these regulations, from the first to the second phase, three teams per group went through to the second phase on the basis of points obtained on the field of play. Another two per group went through on the basis of average revenue per game, meaning that the clubs that brought the most fans to their matches went through. Prepared by Antônio do Passo, the document presented to the press as a way of publicizing the tournament is based on the successful experience of the last Taça de Prata. The split into two categories allowed clubs in the Divisão de Acesso to ascend to the Série Especial (where the top teams were) as long as they met the minimum "professional character" requirements, such as a stadium and conditions to host visiting delegations.

The major obstacle pointed out in this plan was the long distances between the capitals of such a large country, a problem that would have to be handled by Brigadier Jerônimo Bastos, the new president of the CND who had replaced General Loi Menezes at the beginning of 1971. With extensive experience in sport as an activist and manager, Bastos, who headed the Brazilian football delegation that won the World Cup in Mexico, would have the task of facing up to the problem raised by the CBD's project, which openly advocated public funding of the Campeonato Nacional. The organization's request, which claimed that the new championship would face difficulties in extending to other units of the Brazilian Federation in the future, due to two serious burdens: the fees (field rental) imposed on the matches and the air transportation of the delegation, was accepted. After the conclusion of the preliminary phase and each of the final rounds of the Campeonato Nacional, the CBD would send the CND the income reports for each of the games, proving the cost of the fees, as well as the price of the tickets used by the associations for air transportation, in order for these expenses to be reimbursed. This financial support was the key to the realization of the Campeonato Nacional.

However, the first edition of the championship resembled the old Robertão more than a competition that truly integrated the country's football clubs - this was because the Torneio Roberto Gomes Pedrosa/Taça de Prata of 1970 was used as the basis for the creation of the new competition. Ceará, Sport and América Mineiro were the only clubs added, with only those from Ceará representing a different state; in other words, the championship now had twenty clubs instead of seventeen, with no drastic changes besides the creation of a second division. However, there was no relegation, but there was promotion - instead of champions Villa Nova, it was runners-up Remo who won the place in the 1972 Campeonato Nacional.

If, on the one hand, there were stadiums that didn't receive crowds, on the other, there were small clubs that didn't have arenas in good condition, which made their managers apprehensive and fearful of not hosting the big games that were to come, such as in Recife, Manaus, Belém and Florianópolis. For journalist Juca Kfouri, the big challenge is to know which came first: the stratospheric stadiums and the necessity of a major championship to put them to good use, or a major championship and the need to build bigger stadiums. Judging by the date of the construction of major arenas in Brazil during, the answer is obvious: the stadiums came first. The Governador Magalhães Pinto Stadium (Mineirão) dates back to 1959 and was fully completed in 1965; in Maceió, the Rei Pelé Stadium (Trapichão) was inaugurated in October 1970; the people of Campo Grande saw the inauguration of their stadium, the Pedro Pedrossian University Stadium, better known as Morenão, in March 1971. The only large stadium outside this chronological framework is the Governador Plácido Castelo Stadium (Castelão), in Fortaleza, with a capacity for seventy thousand people and inaugurated in November 1973.

Soon after the CBD's list was released with the number of spots each state was entitled to and how each one should fill this list with its representatives, there were many protests and few compliments for the CBD's president. Some teams decided to make public their dissatisfaction with the privilege the organization was giving to certain states. Participating in the Campeonato Nacional became a political issue, and governors joined forces with club leaders to pressure for their teams. In Goiás, governor Leonino Caiado supported the idea of Halê Selassié Pinheiro, the then president of the state, to hold a competition parallel to the Campeonato Nacional de Clubes; the Torneio de Integração Nacional (English: National Integration Tournament), a name with a clear reference to Médici's plans, featuring teams that had been left out of the "CBD party". The argument was always the same: football would be a great promotion for their states. In Pernambuco, Governor Eraldo Gueiros announced his willingness to involve the state government in the fight to renovate the Arruda Stadium.

This parallel championship, which was also held in 1971, involved six clubs from Goiás, accompanied by representatives from ten other states, including four that were not in the Campeonato Nacional de Clubes. It is not safe to assume that this tournament was the main driving force behind the first increase in the number of clubs in the Campeonato Nacional, but it certainly had an influence. The Torneio de Integração Nacional demonstrated that the country's main league was not fully inclusive, and that there were states excluded from the national football elite. To corroborate the government's discourse, the 1972 edition of the Campeonato Nacional gained six more teams, with the inclusion of five new states that didn't yet have teams in the competition. This was just the first stage in the process of integration promoted by the Médici government; in the following editions, the expansion of the tournament became more intense.

The evolution of national tournaments before and especially after the creation of the Campeonato Nacional de Clubes involved the contribution of several other elements. During this period, the military regime used football results more openly in its own propaganda machine. Historian Gerson Wasen Fraga comments that "they took advantage of the new element of winning the 1970 World Cup much more than the championship. Before the World Cup, there was already the idea that if Brazil won, this would be taken advantage of. The government knew it could profit from football, a very old perception, dating back to before the dictatorship." At the time of the so-called Economic Miracle so acclaimed by the military, the media and the Sports Lottery worked together to ensure that the Campeonato Nacional won over the public. The Brazilian champions prior to 1971 are no longer recognized and the first edition of the Campeonato Nacional de Clubes is now considered the starting point of the current Campeonato Brasileiro de Futebol, with the championships prior to this time being excluded from this historical process. The CBF only recognized the national championships played before 1971 again in 2010.

For many historians, the exclusion of previous versions of Brazil's biggest national competition was due to political reasons. "Brazil was living through a dictatorship that was realizing how football could be used to promote ufanism and the image of national integration," wrote journalist and historian Roberto Assaf. The triumph of the Brazilian national team in the 1970 World Cup is the most striking example of the interventions made by the military government in national football. However, they also determined several guidelines that influenced the clubs. The creation of the Campeonato Nacional de Clubes in 1971 was the result of the National Integration Plan.

João Havelange, the former president of the CBD who created the Taça Brasil, the Torneio Roberto Gomes Pedrosa and the Campeonato Nacional de Clubes, stated that the competitions were a continuation of one another. According to Odir Cunha, the emergence of the Campeonato Nacional de Clubes did not invalidate previous Brazilian titles. For many years, the Taça Brasil and the Torneio Roberto Gomes Pedrosa were included in the club rankings. João Havelange also declared in 2010 that he was in favor of unifying the titles of the Taça Brasil and the Torneio Roberto Gomes Pedrosa with the Campeonato Brasileiro. At an official Santos event, he said that "if the titles existed, it's because the competitions were official and, if they were official, they should be respected."

The military regime's manipulation of Brazilian football to satisfy local political leaders is evident in the increase in the number of teams taking part in each edition of the tournament. When the Campeonato Nacional was created in 1971, only twenty clubs competed in the top division. The 1972 edition had twenty-six teams, with the inclusion of five new states (Alagoas, Amazonas, Pará, Rio Grande do Norte and Sergipe), two from the northern region, which until then had no teams in the tournament. The number of participants in the championship has only grown since then. In 1973, it jumped to forty teams, which seemed to be the ideal number, including clubs from the Federal District, Espírito Santo, Goiás, Maranhão, Mato Grosso, Piauí and Santa Catarina; the number of competitors remained the same the following year. In 1975, when Havelange resigned from the presidency of the CBD, his substitute, Admiral Heleno Nunes, reformulated the competition and renamed it the Copa Brasil; only two more clubs were added. However, from then on, the competition expanded drastically, reaching fifty-four participants in 1976, when every state in the federation had at least one representative in the league.

For some authors, the Campeonato Nacional, which prioritized political interests, became a big "job platform", filled with clubs that didn't have the quality to compete in the country's most important competition. The famous phrase "Where ARENA is doing badly, a team goes to Nacional. Where it's doing well, another one goes too," reached its climax at the beginning of Heleno Nunes' tenure, as he tried to get around the political crises of the regime's party through football. ARENA, which was the ruling party, distributed invitations to clubs in all regions of Brazil, satisfying the fans and guaranteeing the people's sympathy. There was no longer any sporting merit; teams with no track record or tradition were invited for political expediency. To get into the Nacional, all you needed was a nomination and the protection of an influential politician. This led to sixty-two teams in 1977, seventy-four in 1978 and the absolute record of ninety-four participants in the first division in 1979, when Corinthians, Portuguesa, Santos and São Paulo opted to withdraw from the overly bloated championship. In addition to expansion, the construction of gigantic stadiums also intensified under the governments of Médici and Geisel. "They were showy constructions. Stadiums for less than 70,000 people were considered small. And it was a time when fans were filling the stands, it made sense. There was no end to the money during the military regime. There was no control over public spending. After the political change, there was no way the clubs could keep it up. Many of these stadiums rotted away. The case of Fonte Nova is emblematic," comments journalist and historian Marcos Guterman.

As well as making the sport truly national, the construction of stadiums also appealed to the political colonels in areas where football wasn't exactly a success. According to the context of the time, putting a team in the Campeonato Nacional meant integrating the community. According to Guterman, the construction of large stadiums and the bloating of the championship to satisfy political alliances was also an attempt to bring the cartolas into the military's political orbit.

Internal football administration was also affected. The coaching staff of the Brazilian national team was militarized and there was a strong presence of people linked to the government in control of the federations. In another move with a political backdrop, Law 6.251 was passed on October 8, 1975, centralizing decisions in the CBD and local authorities. The clubs were given even more autonomy in their actions, especially in the organization of the national championship, a reality that is not so different from today, with CBF votes restricted to the presidents of the state entities.

As a result of these interventions, most historians believe that many of the problems holding Brazilian football back today have their origins in the way the military regime used the clubs for political purposes. Although, according to journalist Juca Kfouri, it's important to point out that many of these problems predate the military coup, dating back to the Getúlio Vargas government. "But football still suffers from later issues," says the journalist, who was editor-in-chief of Placar magazine during the dictatorship.

=== The press reception for the new championship ===
The mainstream media was not so enthusiastic about the Campeonato Nacional. For many reasons, such as the participation of Brazilian athletes in the Pan American Games in Cali, the greater importance given to the state championships (some ended practically on the eve of the first round of the Nacional, others only ended during the new competition), the fact that some sectors perceived the championship as just a continuation of the Taça de Prata and the constant contact with the national team players, made the country's most widely circulated newspapers cover the preparations or even the first round without much prominence. Winning the Copa Roca against Argentina in Buenos Aires, Pelé's official farewell to the Brazilian national team and its impact on the direction of the squad, attracted more attention than the championship itself. In the week of the competition's creation, Veja magazine headlined its sports section "Aberta a I Feira Nacional do Craque" ("1st National Player Fair opens"), referring to the championship as a way of showing possible replacements for the greatest "player of the century" to Zagallo, coach of the national team at the time. The interviewee was not a club player or manager, but the coach of the national team, clarifying that the championship was just a distraction.

Folha de S. Paulo, the newspaper with the largest circulation in São Paulo, carried the following headlines in its Saturday edition in bold letters: "Um encontro presidencial na Amazônia" (about President Médici's meeting in the Amazon rainforest with President Misael Pastrana Borrero of Colombia, in which they signed a joint declaration on the integration of the Amazon); "Caetano chega para gravar com João Gilberto" (Caetano Veloso would break his London exile to record a special with João Gilberto); "Termina hoje no Pacífico a mais longa missão espacial" (reporting on the arrival of Apollo 15 after it photographed a double eclipse of the Moon and the Sun); and, with less prominence, "Nacional começa hoje; São Paulo e Corinthians jogam" (Nacional starts today; São Paulo and Corinthians play). It's interesting to point out that, in the sports section, there was only a technical report on the two matches involving the São Paulo teams, a brief explanation of the championship format, and a quick mention of the other matches that Saturday. However, the newspaper dedicated a lot of space to the CBD's decision to hold a tournament in honor of the sesquicentenary of Brazil's independence. The Independence Cup, the result of the convergence of interests between FIFA (since the tournament would expose the organization's brand two years after the World Cup), the CBD (it would be another opportunity for João Havelange to demonstrate his organizational and managerial capacity) and the military government (the commemoration of independence would once again unite ufanistic nationalism and the Brazilian national team), meant that the national team once again left the new championship "on the side". Even the FIFA president, who was in Rio de Janeiro, praised the infrastructure of the Brazilian stadiums to host this commemorative tournament, overshadowing the inaugural matches of the Campeonato Nacional.

The Estado de S. Paulo, on the other hand, carried a small article at the bottom of the front page, with the headline "Começa o Nacional de Clubes" ("The National Club Championship begins"), along with a photo of the São Paulo team training for their opening match against Grêmio at 4pm in the Morumbi. On Sunday, the newspaper's sports section featured a presentation of the twenty clubs involved in the competition. Each match received its own technical sheet and a brief presentation of the squad and the history of the clubs involved. Atlético Mineiro, led by Telê Santana, was considered one of the favorites for the title.

In Rio de Janeiro, the Jornal do Brasil, which carried Armando Nogueira's column at the time of the CBD's announcement, had a very optimistic view of the Campeonato Nacional de Clubes. Nogueira said that the creation of the championship would be a decisive step towards the consolidation of professional football in Brazil. However, on the Tuesday before the opening of the tournament, the newspaper highlighted the difficulty in preparing the Sports Lottery. Test 53 of the lottery featured ten matches from the Campeonato Nacional.

On the other hand, if the mainstream press wasn't excited about the Nacional, the specialized media paid more attention to the tournament. Two of the main newspapers in this segment, Jornal dos Sports (which only circulated in Rio de Janeiro) and the weekly magazine Placar (recently launched with the proposal of being a magazine with national circulation) published several articles on the subject. Since the beginning of the year, but especially from May onwards, there have been several publications seeking to understand how the competition works, what would be the differences and similarities with the Torneio Roberto Gomes Pedrosa/Taça de Prata, criticisms of the criteria used for teams to enter the competition or even the way the CBD has handled the matter.

Jornal dos Sports, when talking about the Rio clubs taking part in the Campeonato Nacional, presents Fluminense as follows: "Flu parte para o bi com toda a força" ("Flu goes for the bi with all its might"). In other words, just like Placar the previous year (which ran an article with the headline "Flu is Brazil's champion!"), Jornal dos Sports also treats Fluminense as Brazilian champions even without the official existence of the Campeonato Nacional de Clubes, considering the Torneio Roberto Gomes Pedrosa as such. Years later, this issue would become very important and the subject of sporting and political disputes. However, an analysis of the newspaper's articles on the Nacional shows the enthusiasm for the new championship, even celebrating on its cover that Brazilian football would grow from Saturday, August 7, after the opening match. Under the headline "Futebol abre hoje uma paixão nacional" ("Soccer starts today as a national passion"), the newspaper carries an extensive article that recounts the history of national tournaments, explaining everything from the creation of the first interstate competition between teams from Rio de Janeiro and São Paulo to the 1971 Campeonato Nacional. The ufanism so characteristic of that era is absolutely palpable in this article from Rio de Janeiro's best-selling sports newspaper.

However, Placar magazine, which had fought throughout 1970 for the creation of the Campeonato Nacional de Clubes, eventually adopted a cautious position after the creation of the new competition. Under the headline "Até que enfim um Campeonato Nacional — mas tem que melhorar" ("At last a National Championship - but it has to improve"), the magazine criticized the hegemony of political factors over footballing aspects. For it, the Nacional "was nothing more than a slightly different Robertão", which did nothing to change the archaic structure of Brazilian football. Placar complains about the lack of a real system of access and relegation, the criteria for selecting the participating clubs, which was linked to the state championships, and it wasn't clear what parameters were used for the number of places for each state, leaving many federations out of the competition (such as Rio de Janeiro, Goiás, Santa Catarina and Amazonas). For the magazine, João Havelange was once again the great winner.

== Statistics ==
=== Champions ===
Year	Champion	Runner-up	3rd place	4th place	Top scorer	Goals
1971	Atlético Mineiro	São Paulo	Botafogo	Corinthians	Dadá Maravilha (CAM)	15
1972	Palmeiras	Botafogo	Internacional	Corinthians	Dadá Maravilha (CAM) and Pedro Rocha (SAO)	17
1973	Palmeiras	São Paulo	Cruzeiro	Internacional	Ramón (STA)	21
1974	Vasco da Gama	Cruzeiro	Santos	Internacional	Roberto Dinamite (VAS)	16

=== Titles per club ===
Titles	Club	Editions
2	Palmeiras	1972 and 1973
1	Atlético Mineiro	1971
1	Vasco da Gama	1974

=== Titles per state ===
States	Titles	Club
São Paulo	2	2
Minas Gerais	1	1
Rio de Janeiro	1	1

=== Average audience ===
- 1971 - 20 360 (total: 4 662 440);
- 1972 - 17 591 (total: 6 192 032);
- 1973 - 15 460 (total: 10 141 760);
- 1974 - 11 599 (total: 5 184 753);

=== Biggest average audiences per club ===
- 1971 - Flamengo (37 026);
- 1972 - Corinthians (40 719);
- 1973 - Flamengo (33 660);
- 1974 - Vasco da Gama (36 619);

=== Largest audiences ===
- Vasco da Gama 2-2 Internacional, Maracanã, 118,777 people, July 28, 1974;
- Vasco da Gama 2-1 Cruzeiro, Maracanã, 112,993 people, August 1, 1974;

=== Number of games, goals and average goals per edition ===
- 1971: 229 games, 419 goals and an average of 1.83 goals per game;
- 1972: 352 games, 731 goals and an average of 2.08 goals per game;
- 1973: 656 games, 1266 goals and an average of 1.93 goals per game;
- 1974: 447 games, 948 goals and an average of 2.12 goals per game;

=== Number of participants per edition ===
- 1971: 20;
- 1972: 26;
- 1973: 40;
- 1974: 40;

=== Number of states represented in each edition ===
- 1971: 8;
- 1972: 13;
- 1973: 20;
- 1974: 20;

== See also ==
- Torneio Roberto Gomes Pedrosa
- Taça Brasil
- Copa União
- Copa João Havelange
- History of football in Brazil
- List of football clubs in Brazil
