= Waldemar Fiúme =

Brazilian footballer

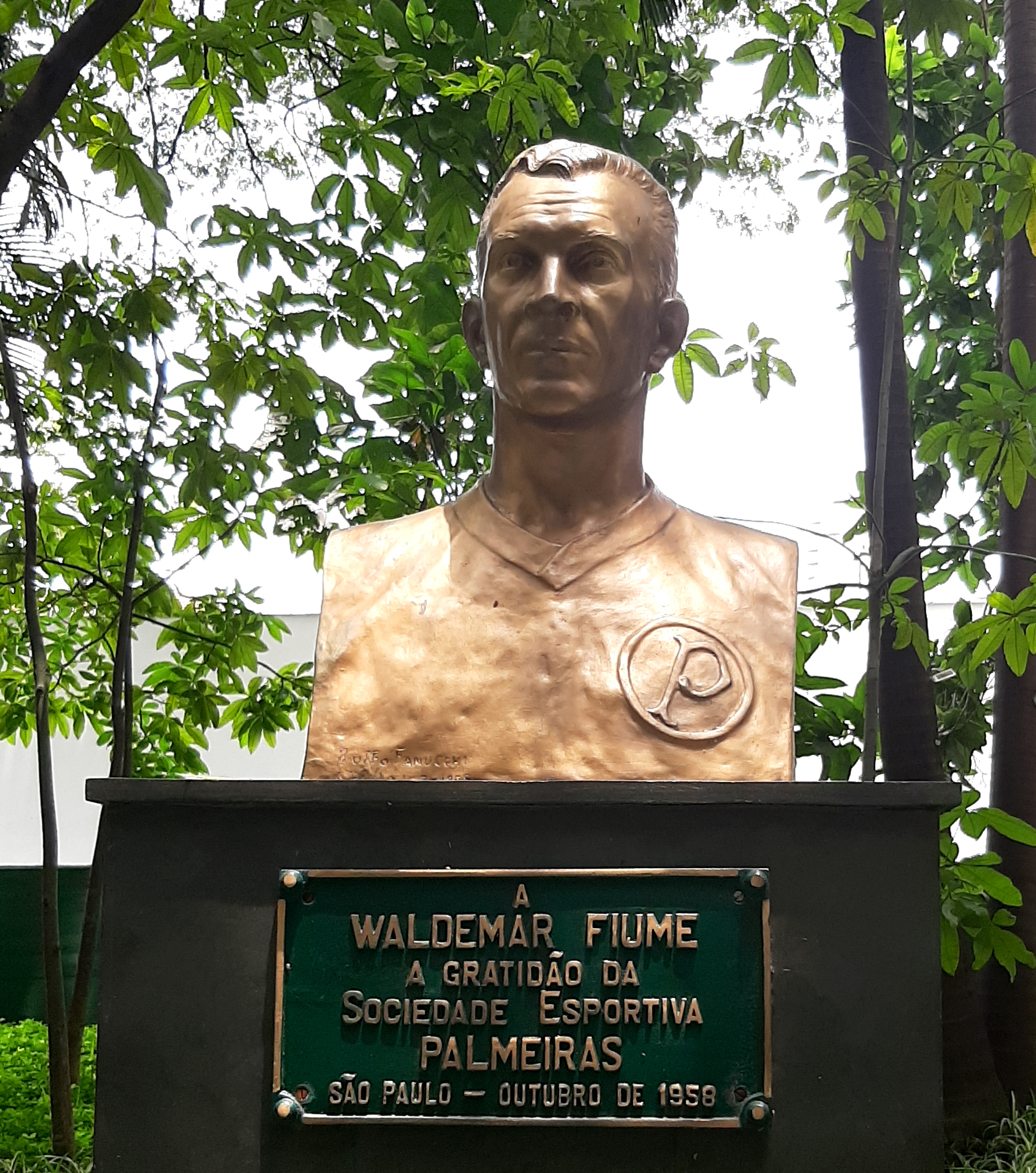
- Statue honoring Fiúme at the SE Palmeiras.

Personal information
- Full name: Waldemar Fiúme
- Date of birth: 12 October 1922
- Place of birth: São Paulo, Brazil
- Date of death: 6 November 1996 (aged 74)
- Place of death: São Paulo, Brazil
- Position: Midfielder

Senior career*
Years	Team	Apps	(Gls)
1941–1958	Palmeiras	620	(27)
- * Club domestic league appearances and goals as of 18 June 2024

Waldemar Fiúme (12 October 1922 – 6 November 1996), was a Brazilian professional footballer who played as a midfielder.

== Career ==
Son of an Italian father and a Brazilian mother, Fiúme began his career playing in amateur football in the city of São Paulo. In 1941, it was taken to the professionals at the then Palestra Itália, where it enchanted everyone with its quality. He earned the nickname "Father of the Ball", and for the club he made 620 appearances, being state champion four times, the Copa Rio and the Rio-São Paulo Tournament. Even though he never defended the Brazil national team, he played for the São Paulo state football team several times, and in 1958 received a bust in his honor at the Palestra Itália Stadium.

== Honours ==
Palmeiras

- Campeonato Paulista: 1942, 1944, 1947, 1950
- Torneio Início Paulista: 1942, 1946
- Taça dos Campeões Estaduais Rio-São Paulo: 1942, 1947
- Copa Rio: 1951
- Torneio Rio-São Paulo: 1951

Individual

- Campeonato Paulista Team of the Tournament: 1947, 1948, 1950
- Campeonato Paulista Player of the Tournament: 1947, 1948

== See also ==
- List of one-club men in association football
