= Nei Conceição =

Brazilian footballer (born 1946)

Personal information
- Full name: Nei da Conceição Moreira
- Date of birth: 8 December 1946 (age 79)
- Place of birth: São João de Meriti, Brazil
- Position: Midfielder

Youth career
- 1963–1966: Botafogo

Senior career*
Years	Team	Apps	(Gls)
1966–1974	Botafogo	340	(13)
1975	CSA		

International career
1970–1971	Brazil	2	(0)
- * Club domestic league appearances and goals as of 31 May 2024

Nei da Conceição Moreira (born 8 December 1946), simply known as Nei Conceição, is a Brazilian former professional footballer who played as a midfielder.

== Career ==
Former Botafogo FR midfielder, Nei Conceição participated in winning the team's first national title, the 1968 Taça Brasil. He played for the club from 1966 to 1974, making 340 appearances and scoring 13 goals. He ended his career with CSA in 1975.

For the Brazil national team, Conceição participated in two friendly matches, against Chile and Czechoslovakia. He would be part of the squad that would compete in the 1970 FIFA World Cup, but due to an episode of indiscipline, he was left out of the final list.

== Honours ==
Botafogo

- Taça Brasil: 1968
- Torneio Rio-São Paulo: 1966 (shared)
- Campeonato Carioca: 1967, 1968
- Taça Guanabara: 1967, 1968
- Torneio Início: 1967

CSA

- Campeonato Alagoano: 1975
