= 1972 in Brazilian football =

Football in Brazil
- Season: 1972

The following article presents a summary of the 1972 football (soccer) season in Brazil, which was the 71st season of competitive football in the country.

== Campeonato Brasileiro Série A ==
Semifinals

Home team	Score	Away team
Palmeiras	1-1	Internacional
Botafogo	2-1	Corinthians

Final

December 23, 1972

Palmeiras	0–0	Botafogo

Beira-Rio

Palmeiras declared as the Campeonato Brasileiro champions.

== Campeonato Brasileiro Série B ==
Second Stage

Teams advanced to the final

Group E

Position	Team	Points	Played	Won	Drawn	Lost	For	Against	Difference
1	Sampaio Corrêa	8	6	3	2	1	6	3	3
2	Tiradentes-PI	8	6	3	2	1	6	3	3
3	Atlético-BA	4	6	1	2	3	2	5	-3
4	Itabaiana	4	6	1	2	3	2	5	-3

Group F

Position	Team	Points	Played	Won	Drawn	Lost	For	Against	Difference
1	Campinense	12	6	6	0	0	11	2	9
2	América-RN	8	6	4	0	2	9	5	4
3	CSA	2	6	1	0	5	3	8	-5
4	América-PE	2	6	1	0	5	3	11	-8

Final

December 17, 1972

Sampaio Corrêa	1–1 (0–0 after extra time, 5–4 pen)	Campinense

Sampaio Corrêa declared as the Campeonato Brasileiro Série B champions.

=== Promotion ===
No club was promoted to the following year's first level.

== State championship champions ==
State	Champion	State	Champion
Acre	Independência	Pará	Paysandu
Alagoas	CRB	Paraíba	Campinense
Amapá	Santana	Paraná	Coritiba
Amazonas	Nacional	Pernambuco	Santa Cruz
Bahia	Bahia	Piauí	Tiradentes-PI
Ceará	Ceará	Rio de Janeiro	Barbará
Distrito Federal	Serviço Gráfico	Rio Grande do Norte	ABC
Espírito Santo	Desportiva	Rio Grande do Sul	Internacional
Goiás	Goiás	Rondônia	Moto Clube
Guanabara	Flamengo	Roraima	-
Maranhão	Sampaio Corrêa	Santa Catarina	Figueirense
Mato Grosso	Operário (VG)	São Paulo	Palmeiras
Mato Grosso do Sul	-	Sergipe	Sergipe
Minas Gerais	Cruzeiro	Tocantins	-

== Youth competition champions ==
Competition	Champion
Copa São Paulo de Juniores	Nacional-SP

== Other competition champions ==
Competition	Champion
Torneio do Povo	Flamengo

== Brazilian clubs in international competitions ==
Team	Copa Libertadores 1972
Atlético Mineiro	Group stage
São Paulo	Semifinals

== Brazil national team ==
The following table lists all the games played by the Brazil national football team in official competitions and friendly matches during 1972.

Date	Opposition	Result	Score	Brazil scorers	Competition
April 26, 1972	Paraguay	W	3-2	Carlos Alberto Torres, Tostão, Dirceu Lopes	International Friendly
June 10, 1972	Brazil Olympic Team	W	2-1	Rivellino, Jairzinho	International Friendly (unofficial match)
June 13, 1972	(Germany) Hamburger SV	W	2-0	Rivellino, Gérson	International Friendly (unofficial match)
June 17, 1972	Rio Grande do Sul State Combined Team	D	3-3	Jairzinho, Paulo César Caju, Rivellino	International Friendly (unofficial match)
June 28, 1972	Czechoslovakia	D	0-0	-	Minicopa
July 2, 1972	Yugoslavia	W	3-0	Leivinha (2), Jairzinho	Minicopa
July 5, 1972	Scotland	W	1-0	Jairzinho	Minicopa
July 9, 1972	Portugal	W	1-0	Jairzinho	Minicopa
