= Minuca (footballer) =

Brazilian footballer

Personal information
- Full name: Hermínio Francisco de Oliveira Filho
- Date of birth: 18 July 1944
- Place of birth: Recife, Brazil
- Date of death: 23 April 2010 (aged 65)
- Place of death: São Paulo, Brazil
- Position: Defender

Senior career*
Years	Team	Apps	(Gls)
1962–1964	Santa Cruz		
1964	América-RJ		
1965–1972	Palmeiras		
1972–1975	Marília		
- * Club domestic league appearances and goals

Hermínio Francisco de Oliveira Filho (18 July 1944 – 23 April 2010), known as Minuca, was a Brazilian football player.

He played club football for Santa Cruz, América-RJ, Palmeiras and Marília. Minuca played in 194 matches for Palmeiras from 1965 to 1972, and won the Campeonato Paulista in 1966 and the Torneio Roberto Gomes Pedrosa and Taça Brasil in 1967 with the club.
