= 1976 Campeonato Paulista =

Campeonato Paulista – Série A1
- Season: 1976
- Champions: Palmeiras (18th title)
- Copa Brasil: Corinthians; Santos; Ponte Preta; XV de Piracicaba; Guarani; Palmeiras; São Paulo; Botafogo; Portuguesa
- Matches played: 219
- Goals scored: 442 (2.02 per match)
- Top goalscorer: Sócrates (Botafogo) – 15 goals
- Biggest home win: Ferroviária 5-0 Portuguesa Santista (April 21, 1976); São Paulo 5-0 Noroeste (August 21, 1976)
- Biggest away win: Marília 0-4 Corinthians (February 22, 1976); São Bento 0-4 Portuguesa (April 17, 1976); Portuguesa Santista 2-6 Portuguesa (May 16, 1976)
- Highest scoring: Portuguesa Santista 2-6 Portuguesa (May 16, 1976)

The 1976 Campeonato Paulista da Divisão Especial de Futebol Profissional was the 75th season of São Paulo's top professional football league. Palmeiras won the championship for the 18th time. No teams were relegated. Botafogo's Sócrates was the highest goalscorer, with 15 goals.

== Championship ==
The championship was divided into two rounds; in the first, the eighteen teams of the championship were divided into three groups of six teams, with each team playing once against all other teams, and the four best teams of each group passing to the Second round. The team with the most points in the first phase regardless of group would gain a bonus point for the Second round. In the second round, the remaining twelve teams would all play against each other once, and the team with the most points would be champion. Although no teams were relegated from last year's championship, Saad, which had been invited into the last two championships, wasn't invited back into the championship for 1976.

=== First round ===
==== Group A ====
Pos	Team	Pld	W	D	L	GF	GA	GD	Pts	Qualification or relegation
1	São Paulo	17	9	5	3	24	10	+14	23	Qualified
2	Portuguesa	17	9	2	6	28	21	+7	20	Qualified
3	XV de Piracicaba	17	3	9	5	15	17	−2	15	Qualified
4	São Bento	17	6	2	9	10	19	−9	14	Qualified
5	Comercial	17	4	6	7	13	17	−4	14	
6	Paulista	17	2	6	9	7	18	−11	10	

Updated to match(es) played on July 4, 1976. Source: RSSSF.com
Rules for classification: 1) points; 2) wins; 3) goal difference; 4) number of goals scored.

==== Group B ====
Pos	Team	Pld	W	D	L	GF	GA	GD	Pts	Qualification or relegation
1	Guarani	17	10	6	1	30	12	+18	26	Qualified
2	Corinthians	17	10	4	3	29	9	+20	24	Qualified
3	Ferroviária	17	6	5	6	21	15	+6	17	Qualified
4	Botafogo	17	4	5	8	21	21	0	13	Qualified
5	Juventus	17	4	5	8	12	23	−11	13	
6	Marília	17	0	5	12	9	31	−22	5	

Updated to match(es) played on July 4, 1976. Source: RSSSF.com
Rules for classification: 1) points; 2) wins; 3) goal difference; 4) number of goals scored.

==== Group C ====
Pos	Team	Pld	W	D	L	GF	GA	GD	Pts	Qualification or relegation
1	Palmeiras	17	9	7	1	24	12	+12	25	Qualified
2	Ponte Preta	17	10	2	5	20	10	+10	22	Qualified
3	América	17	8	5	4	20	18	+2	21	Qualified
4	Noroeste	17	6	6	5	17	14	+3	18	Qualified
5	Santos	17	6	5	6	15	16	−1	17	
6	Portuguesa Santista	17	2	5	10	9	41	−32	9	

Updated to match(es) played on July 4, 1976. Source: RSSSF.com
Rules for classification: 1) points; 2) wins; 3) goal difference; 4) number of goals scored.

=== Second round ===
Pos	Team	Pld	W	D	L	GF	GA	GD	Pts	Qualification or relegation
1	Palmeiras	11	8	3	0	15	6	+9	19	Champions
2	XV de Piracicaba	11	5	4	2	11	8	+3	14	
3	Guarani	11	2	8	1	9	8	+1	13	
4	Botafogo	11	4	4	3	12	9	+3	12	
5	América	11	3	6	2	8	6	+2	12	
6	Ponte Preta	11	4	3	4	10	7	+3	11	
7	São Paulo	11	3	5	3	15	8	+7	11	
8	Portuguesa	11	3	5	3	10	12	−2	11	
9	Noroeste	11	3	3	5	8	13	−5	9	
10	São Bento	11	3	3	5	7	12	−5	9	
11	Corinthians	11	3	1	7	6	13	−7	7	
12	Ferroviária	11	2	1	8	7	16	−9	5	

Updated to match(es) played on August 28, 1976. Source: RSSSF.com
Rules for classification: 1) points; 2) wins; 3) goal difference; 4) number of goals scored.
