= 1972 Campeonato Paulista =

Campeonato Paulista – Série A1
- Season: 1972
- Champions: Palmeiras (16th title)
- Campeonato Nacional: Palmeiras; São Paulo; Santos; Corinthians; Portuguesa; Guarani
- Matches: 264
- Goals: 568 (2.15 per match)
- Top goalscorer: Toninho Guerreiro (São Paulo) – 17 goals
- Biggest home win: São Bento 6-1 Marília (September 1, 1971); São Paulo 5-0 XV de Piracicaba (May 13, 1972); Corinthians 5-0 Ferroviária (May 18, 1972)
- Biggest away win: XV de Piracicaba 0-4 Palmeiras (March 19, 1972); América 0-4 Corinthians (March 26, 1972)
- Highest scoring: São Bento 6-1 Marília (September 1, 1971); Juventus 4-3 Ferroviária (July 23, 1972)

The 1972 Campeonato Paulista da Divisão Especial de Futebol Profissional, organized by the Federação Paulista de Futebol, was the 71st season of São Paulo's top professional football league. Palmeiras won the title for the 16th time. No teams were relegated. São Paulo's Toninho Guerreiro was the top scorer with 17 goals.

== Championship ==
Much like in the previous year, a preliminary phase was disputed before the championship proper, in which all teams played against each other twice and the six best teams qualified into the main championship. That phase was to be disputed in the second semester of 1971, by the teams that had been eliminated in that phase in the previous year, the six worst-placed teams in the main championship and Marília, that had been promoted from the Second Level.

In the championship proper, each team played against the others twice, and the team with the most points won the title.

=== Preliminary phase ===
==== League table ====
Pos	Team	Pld	W	D	L	GF	GA	GD	Pts	Qualification or relegation
1	Ferroviária	22	10	11	1	22	8	+14	31	Qualified
2	Juventus	22	12	6	4	34	21	+13	30	Qualified
3	América	22	10	6	6	24	17	+7	26	Qualified
4	São Bento	22	9	7	6	25	18	+7	25	Qualified
5	Guarani	22	8	8	6	24	17	+7	24	Qualified
6	XV de Piracicaba	22	9	4	9	23	28	−5	22	Qualified
7	Comercial	22	7	7	8	28	26	+2	21	Eliminated
8	Botafogo	22	6	8	8	22	27	−5	20	Eliminated
9	Paulista	22	7	4	11	22	26	−4	18	Eliminated
10	Portuguesa Santista	22	6	6	10	20	29	−9	18	Eliminated
11	Marília	22	6	5	11	25	33	−8	17	Eliminated
12	Noroeste	22	3	6	13	22	41	−19	12	Eliminated

Updated to match(es) played on March 1, 1972. Source: Brfut.blogspot.com Brfut.blogspot.com
Rules for classification: 1) points; 2) goal difference; 3) wins; 4) number of goals scored.

===== Results =====
Home \ Away	AME	BOT	COM	FER	GUA	JUV	MAR	NOR	PAU	AAP	SBO	XVP
América	—	4–0	1–0	0–1	2–1	1–1	2–1	3–0	1–0	3–0	1–0	2–0
Botafogo	1–1	—	0–0	1–3	1–1	0–1	2–1	3–1	3–1	1–1	2–1	1–0
Comercial	1–1	0–0	—	1–1	1–0	4–1	2–1	3–0	3–0	1–2	3–0	0–2
Ferroviária	1–0	1–0	2–0	—	3–0	1–0	0–0	4–2	0–0	0–0	0–0	1–0
Guarani	0–0	1–1	4–0	0–0	—	3–0	1–0	1–0	2–0	2–1	0–0	1–1
Juventus	3–0	2–1	3–1	0–0	1–0	—	1–1	1–1	3–2	1–0	2–0	4–0
Marília	0–0	3–1	1–1	1–2	1–0	1–0	—	3–2	1–0	3–0	2–2	0–1
Noroeste	2–1	1–1	1–3	0–0	2–1	1–3	3–1	—	0–0	2–3	0–0	1–2
Paulista	4–0	1–2	1–0	1–1	2–2	1–2	1–0	2–0	—	1–0	1–0	2–0
Portuguesa Santista	0–1	0–0	0–0	0–0	0–2	1–1	2–1	3–2	3–2	—	1–3	2–0
São Bento	1–0	1–0	1–1	1–0	1–1	2–2	6–1	2–0	1–0	1–0	—	2–0
XV de Piracicaba	0–0	2–1	4–3	1–1	0–1	0–2	4–2	1–1	2–0	2–1	1–0	—

Updated to match(es) played on March 1, 1972. Source: Brfut.blogspot.com Brfut.blogspot.com
Legend: Blue = home team win; Yellow = draw; Red = away team win.

=== Championship proper ===
==== League table ====
Pos	Team	Pld	W	D	L	GF	GA	GD	Pts	Qualification or relegation
1	Palmeiras	22	15	7	0	33	8	+25	37	Champions
2	São Paulo	22	14	8	0	32	7	+25	36	Campeonato Nacional
3	Santos	22	14	1	7	31	21	+10	29	Campeonato Nacional
4	Corinthians	22	10	8	4	28	10	+18	28	Campeonato Nacional
5	Portuguesa	22	8	7	7	31	25	+6	23	Campeonato Nacional
6	Guarani	22	8	6	8	16	22	−6	22	Campeonato Nacional
7	Ponte Preta	22	5	11	6	19	20	−1	21	1973 Preliminary tournament
8	Juventus	22	5	6	11	24	34	−10	16	1973 Preliminary tournament
9	América	22	5	5	12	19	28	−9	15	1973 Preliminary tournament
10	São Bento	22	4	7	11	16	29	−13	15	1973 Preliminary tournament
11	Ferroviária	22	5	4	13	18	37	−19	14	1973 Preliminary tournament
12	XV de Piracicaba	22	1	6	15	10	36	−26	8	1973 Preliminary tournament

Updated to match(es) played on September 7, 1972. Source: RSSSF.com
Rules for classification: 1) points; 2) goal difference; 3) wins; 4) number of goals scored.

==== Results ====
Home \ Away	AME	COR	FER	GUA	JUV	PAL	PON	POR	SAN	SBO	SPO	XVP
América	—	0–4	1–0	3–0	3–2	0–2	0–0	1–1	0–1	0–0	4–2	0–0
Corinthians	1–0	—	5–0	2–0	0–0	1–1	1–0	4–1	1–1	1–1	1–1	2–0
Ferroviária	3–2	0–2	—	0–1	1–1	0–1	3–2	2–1	0–3	1–1	1–1	1–0
Guarani	1–0	1–0	0–1	—	1–0	1–1	0–0	0–0	1–0	2–0	0–1	2–1
Juventus	2–3	1–0	4–3	1–0	—	0–1	0–2	1–1	2–3	0–0	0–1	1–1
Palmeiras	1–0	0–0	1–0	1–0	2–1	—	4–1	1–1	2–1	2–1	0–0	1–0
Ponte Preta	1–0	0–1	2–0	0–0	2–2	1–1	—	1–1	2–3	1–1	0–0	2–1
Portuguesa	2–0	1–0	3–1	0–0	5–1	0–3	0–0	—	0–1	4–0	0–1	3–1
Santos	1–0	0–1	2–0	4–2	2–1	0–1	1–0	3–1	—	2–1	0–2	1–0
São Bento	0–0	2–1	1–0	2–2	1–2	0–3	0–1	2–3	0–1	—	0–2	2–0
São Paulo	2–1	0–0	3–1	4–0	1–0	0–0	1–1	1–0	3–1	1–0	—	5–0
XV de Piracicaba	2–4	0–0	0–0	1–2	1–2	0–4	0–0	1–3	1–0	0–1	0–0	—

Updated to match(es) played on September 7, 1972. Source: RSSSF.com
Legend: Blue = home team win; Yellow = draw; Red = away team win.

== Top Scores ==
Rank	Player	Club	Goals
1	Toninho Guerreiro	São Paulo	17
2	César Maluco	Palmeiras	11
3	Alcindo	Santos	9
3	Pelé	Santos	9
3	Basílio	Portuguesa	9
