= 1974 Campeonato Paulista =

Campeonato Paulista – Série A1
- Season: 1974
- Champions: Palmeiras (17th title)
- Copa Brasil: Palmeiras; Corinthians; São Paulo; Portuguesa; Santos; Guarani
- Matches played: 366
- Goals scored: 725 (1.98 per match)
- Top goalscorer: Geraldão (Botafogo) – 23 goals
- Biggest home win: Portuguesa Santista 5-0 Paulista (November 28, 1973); Corinthians 5-0 América (August 4, 1974)
- Biggest away win: São Bento 0-5 Portuguesa (September 28, 1974)
- Highest scoring: XV de Piracicaba 4-3 Portuguesa Santista(November 18, 1973); Nacional 3-4 Paulista (November 21, 1973); Botafogo 5-2 Portuguesa (November 23, 1974); Botafogo 4-3 Saad (December 1, 1974)

The 1974 Campeonato Paulista da Divisão Especial de Futebol Profissional, organized by the Federação Paulista de Futebol, was the 73rd season of São Paulo's top professional football league. Palmeiras won the championship by the 17th time, becoming the greatest champion of São Paulo, remaining in that position until 1982, when Corinthians won their 18th title and surpassed the rival in state achievements. In the 1974 season, the runner-up was the Corinthians team, who had already gone for twenty years without winning the Paulista title. No teams were relegated and the top scorer was Botafogo's Geraldão with 23 goals.

== Championship ==
Much like in the previous year, a preliminary phase was disputed before the championship proper, in which all teams played against each other twice and the seven best teams qualified into the main championship. That phase was to be disputed in the second semester of 1973, by all of the teams that had disputed that phase in the previous year, with the exception of Juventus, and with the addition of three guests - Nacional, Rio Preto and Saad. Out of these, Saad would be the only one to be invited again in the next year.

The championship proper was divided into two rounds, in which each team played against each other once, and the winner of each round qualified to the Finals.

=== Preliminary round ===
==== League table ====
Pos	Team	Pld	W	D	L	GF	GA	GD	Pts	Qualification or relegation
1	Ponte Preta	26	14	5	7	32	25	+7	33	Qualified
2	América	26	11	10	5	25	13	+12	32	Qualified
3	Botafogo	26	12	8	6	30	19	+11	32	Qualified
4	Saad (G)	26	12	8	6	28	20	+8	32	Qualified
5	Comercial	26	10	11	5	27	18	+9	31	Qualified
6	São Bento	26	13	4	9	28	20	+8	30	Qualified
7	Noroeste	26	11	8	7	32	25	+7	30	Qualified
8	Ferroviária	26	11	7	8	24	22	+2	29	Eliminated
9	Marília	26	11	6	9	33	23	+10	28	Eliminated
10	XV de Piracicaba	26	9	5	12	26	31	−5	23	Eliminated
11	Rio Preto (G)	26	6	10	10	27	31	−4	22	Eliminated
12	Portuguesa Santista	26	5	9	12	20	25	−5	19	Eliminated
13	Nacional (G)	26	5	6	15	27	47	−20	16	Eliminated
14	Paulista	26	2	3	21	14	54	−40	7	Eliminated

Updated to match(es) played on February 10, 1974. Source: Brfut.blogspot.com Brfut.blogspot.com
Rules for classification: 1) points; 2) goal difference; 3) wins; 4) number of goals scored.
(G) Guests

===== Results =====
Home \ Away	AME	BOT	COM	FER	MAR	NAC	NOR	PAU	PON	AAP	RIP	SAA	SBO	XVP
América	—	1–0	0–0	3–0	1–1	2–0	0–0	3–0	0–0	0–0	1–1	3–2	2–0	2–0
Botafogo	1–0	—	1–1	1–0	3–1	2–0	0–1	2–1	2–0	2–1	0–0	0–0	1–3	1–0
Comercial	0–1	1–1	—	1–0	1–0	3–0	1–0	2–0	0–0	1–0	2–0	0–1	0–1	1–1
Ferroviária	0–0	1–0	1–1	—	0–0	4–1	0–2	2–1	3–1	2–0	1–1	1–0	1–0	1–0
Marília	2–0	2–3	2–3	1–0	—	3–0	3–0	2–1	3–0	0–0	1–0	0–0	1–0	1–0
Nacional	0–1	0–1	2–2	1–1	1–1	—	0–0	3–4	1–2	2–0	2–1	0–2	3–1	3–1
Noroeste	3–1	0–1	1–2	0–0	2–1	3–1	—	4–1	2–2	3–1	4–2	2–1	0–0	2–0
Paulista	0–2	1–5	0–1	1–2	1–4	1–2	0–1	—	1–3	0–0	0–0	0–0	1–0	0–3
Ponte Preta	2–1	1–0	1–1	1–0	1–2	2–0	3–0	1–0	—	2–0	2–1	3–1	1–0	1–0
Portuguesa Santista	0–0	1–1	0–0	2–0	1–0	1–0	1–1	5–0	0–1	—	0–0	0–0	1–2	2–0
Rio Preto	0–1	1–1	2–2	1–2	1–1	1–1	2–0	1–0	2–2	1–0	—	2–0	3–0	2–0
Saad	0–0	1–0	1–0	2–0	1–0	3–3	1–1	1–0	2–0	2–1	2–0	—	2–1	3–2
São Bento	1–0	0–0	0–0	1–1	1–0	3–0	1–0	3–0	2–0	1–0	3–1	1–0	—	1–2
XV de Piracicaba	0–0	1–1	2–1	0–1	2–1	2–1	0–0	2–0	1–0	4–3	3–1	0–0	0–2	—

Updated to match(es) played on 10 February 1974. Source: Brfut.blogspot.com Brfut.blogspot.com
Legend: Blue = home team win; Yellow = draw; Red = away team win.

=== First round ===
==== League table ====
Pos	Team	Pld	W	D	L	GF	GA	GD	Pts	Qualification or relegation
1	Corinthians	13	8	3	2	18	7	+11	19	Qualified to the Finals
2	Ponte Preta	13	7	4	2	11	7	+4	18	
3	Portuguesa	13	6	5	2	17	6	+11	17	
4	Santos	13	7	3	3	18	11	+7	17	
5	Palmeiras	13	5	6	2	14	12	+2	16	
6	São Paulo	13	4	6	3	9	10	−1	14	
7	Noroeste	13	6	1	6	15	12	+3	13	
8	Guarani	13	4	5	4	12	9	+3	13	
9	Botafogo	13	4	4	5	15	16	−1	12	
10	Juventus	13	2	8	3	6	6	0	12	
11	América	13	3	3	7	5	18	−13	9	
12	São Bento	13	3	2	8	7	17	−10	8	
13	Saad	13	2	4	7	10	18	−8	8	
14	Comercial	13	2	2	9	10	18	−8	6	

Updated to match(es) played on October 9, 1974. Source: RSSSF.com
Rules for classification: 1) points; 2) goal difference; 3) wins; 4) number of goals scored.

==== Results ====
Home \ Away	AME	BOT	COM	COR	GUA	JUV	NOR	PAL	PON	POR	SAA	SAN	SBO	SPO
América	—	0–0			1–0	0–0		0–1		0–1	1–0		1–0	
Botafogo		—		2–2		0–0	3–1	2–3	1–1					1–0
Comercial	2–2	1–2	—		1–2					1–1	2–1	0–1	0–2	
Corinthians	5–0		1–0	—			1–0	3–1	0–1	0–0			2–0	
Guarani		2–0		1–1	—		0–1		0–0		3–0	2–2		1–1
Juventus			2–0	2–0	0–0	—						1–2	0–0	0–0
Noroeste	2–0		2–1			1–1	—	1–2	3–0	1–0				
Palmeiras			0–2		1–0	0–0		—		1–1	2–2			1–1
Ponte Preta	2–0		1–0			1–0		0–0	—	1–0			2–1	
Portuguesa		3–0			1–0	2–0				—	0–0	1–0		2–2
Saad		0–2		0–2		0–0	0–2		0–2		—		1–1	3–0
Santos	4–0	2–1		0–1			2–1	0–0	2–0		1–3	—		1–1
São Bento		2–1			0–1		1–0	0–2		0–5		0–1	—	
São Paulo	1–0		1–0	0–1			1–0		0–0				1–0	—

Updated to match(es) played on 9 October 1974. Source: RSSSF.com
Legend: Blue = home team win; Yellow = draw; Red = away team win.

=== Second round ===
==== League table ====
Pos	Team	Pld	W	D	L	GF	GA	GD	Pts	Qualification or relegation
1	Palmeiras	13	8	5	0	24	7	+17	21	Qualified to the Finals
2	São Paulo	13	8	4	1	19	5	+14	20	
3	Santos	13	5	8	0	17	11	+6	18	
4	Guarani	13	7	4	2	14	9	+5	18	
5	Botafogo	13	5	4	4	18	14	+4	14	
6	Portuguesa	13	4	6	3	11	11	0	14	
7	Juventus	13	4	5	4	13	13	0	13	
8	Corinthians	13	5	3	5	9	14	−5	13	
9	Comercial	13	2	7	4	10	13	−3	11	
10	Noroeste	13	3	4	6	11	13	−2	10	
11	América	13	2	5	6	7	16	−9	9	
12	São Bento	13	2	4	7	8	21	−13	8	
13	Ponte Preta	13	3	1	9	7	13	−6	7	
14	Saad	13	1	4	8	14	22	−8	6	

Updated to match(es) played on December 15, 1974. Source: RSSSF.com
Rules for classification: 1) points; 2) goal difference; 3) wins; 4) number of goals scored.

==== Results ====
Home \ Away	AME	BOT	COM	COR	GUA	JUV	NOR	PAL	PON	POR	SAA	SAN	SBO	SPO
América	—		0–0	0–1			2–1		2–1			1–1		0–3
Botafogo	0–0	—	3–1		1–2					5–2	4–3	0–2	3–0	
Comercial			—	1–0		1–1	0–0	1–1	0–1					0–0
Corinthians		0–1		—	1–1	1–2					1–0	1–0		
Guarani	1–1		1–0		—	1–1		0–0		1–0			2–1	
Juventus	0–0	0–0				—	1–1	2–2	1–0	1–1	2–1			
Noroeste		0–0		1–0	1–2	2–3	—				1–1		3–0	0–2
Palmeiras	2–0	3–1		4–1			1–0	—	1–0			2–0	4–0	
Ponte Preta		0–0		0–1	0–1		0–1		—		2–1	0–1		1–2
Portuguesa	1–0		2–0	1–1			1–0	1–1	1–0	—			0–0	
Saad	3–1		2–2		0–2			0–1		1–1	—	1–3		
Santos			1–1		1–0	2–1				1–0		—	1–1	
São Bento	2–0		1–3	0–1		1–0			1–2		2–1		—	0–2
São Paulo		1–0		3–0	2–0	2–1		1–2		0–0	0–0	1–1		—

Updated to match(es) played on 15 December 1974. Source: RSSSF.com
Legend: Blue = home team win; Yellow = draw; Red = away team win.

=== Finals ===
Team 1	Agg.	Team 2	1st leg	2nd leg
Corinthians	1–2	Palmeiras	1–1	0–1

== Top Scores ==
Rank	Player	Club	Goals
1	Geraldão	Botafogo	23
2	Leivinha	Palmeiras	14
3	Tatá	Portuguesa	9
4	Cláudio Adão	Santos	7
4	Zé Roberto	Corinthians	7
4	Waldomiro	Ponte Preta	7
4	Wilsinho	Portuguesa	7
8	Rodrigues	Noroeste	6
8	Arlindo	Saad	6
8	Rivellino	Corinthians	6
