= 1969 Campeonato Brasileiro Série A =

Campeonato Brasileiro Série A
- Season: 1969
- Dates: 6 September – 7 December
- Champions: Palmeiras (4th title)
- Matches: 142
- Goals: 381 (2.68 per match)
- Top goalscorer: Edu (14 goals)
- Total attendance: 3,133,514
- Average attendance: 22,067

The 1969 Campeonato Brasileiro Série A (officially the 1969 Torneio Roberto Gomes Pedrosa) was the 14th edition of the Campeonato Brasileiro Série A. It began on 6 September and ended on 7 December. Santos came as the defending champion having won the 1968 season and Palmeiras won the championship, the 4th national title of the club at 10 years of tournament contention.

== Championship format ==
- First-phase: the 17 participants play all against all twice, but divided into two groups (one 8 and one 9) for classification, in the Group A, each team plays two more matches against any other. The first 2 of each group are classified for the finals.
- Final-phase: the four clubs classified play all against all in a single round. The club with most points at this stage is the champion.
- Tie-breaking criteria:

1 – Goal difference
2 – Raffle

- With one victory, a team still gained 2 points, instead of 3.

== First phase ==
=== Group A ===
| Pos | Team | Pld | W | D | L | GF | GA | GD | Pts |
|---|---|---|---|---|---|---|---|---|---|
| 1 | Corinthians | 16 | 10 | 4 | 2 | 29 | 13 | +16 | 24 |
| 2 | Cruzeiro | 16 | 9 | 4 | 3 | 25 | 14 | +11 | 22 |
| 3 | Internacional | 16 | 8 | 4 | 4 | 24 | 15 | +9 | 20 |
| 4 | América-RJ | 16 | 4 | 8 | 4 | 25 | 20 | +5 | 16 |
| 5 | Santos | 16 | 5 | 5 | 6 | 27 | 24 | +3 | 15 |
| 6 | Portuguesa | 16 | 3 | 8 | 5 | 19 | 27 | −8 | 14 |
| 7 | Santa Cruz | 16 | 4 | 6 | 6 | 17 | 27 | −10 | 14 |
| 8 | Flamengo | 16 | 3 | 6 | 7 | 17 | 30 | −13 | 12 |

=== Group B ===
| Pos | Team | Pld | W | D | L | GF | GA | GD | Pts |
|---|---|---|---|---|---|---|---|---|---|
| 1 | Palmeiras | 16 | 9 | 1 | 6 | 24 | 19 | +5 | 19 |
| 2 | Botafogo | 16 | 8 | 2 | 6 | 19 | 18 | +1 | 18 |
| 3 | Atlético Mineiro | 16 | 8 | 1 | 7 | 31 | 23 | +8 | 17 |
| 4 | Fluminense | 16 | 5 | 5 | 6 | 20 | 21 | −1 | 15 |
| 5 | Grêmio | 16 | 5 | 5 | 6 | 17 | 19 | −2 | 15 |
| 6 | Bahia | 16 | 5 | 5 | 6 | 19 | 25 | −6 | 15 |
| 7 | Coritiba | 16 | 5 | 4 | 7 | 19 | 22 | −3 | 14 |
| 8 | São Paulo | 16 | 5 | 4 | 7 | 22 | 27 | −5 | 14 |
| 9 | Vasco | 16 | 2 | 4 | 10 | 13 | 23 | −10 | 8 |

== Final phase ==
| Pos | Team | Pld | W | D | L | GF | GA | GD | Pts |
|---|---|---|---|---|---|---|---|---|---|
| 1 | Palmeiras | 3 | 1 | 2 | 0 | 4 | 2 | +2 | 4 |
| 2 | Cruzeiro | 3 | 1 | 2 | 0 | 5 | 4 | +1 | 4 |
| 3 | Corinthians | 3 | 1 | 1 | 1 | 2 | 2 | 0 | 3 |
| 4 | Botafogo | 3 | 0 | 1 | 2 | 3 | 6 | −3 | 1 |

Matches:

30 November 1969
16:00 UTC−03:00

| Palmeiras | 0–0 | Corinthians |

Pacaembu, São Paulo

30 November 1969
16:00 UTC−03:00

| Botafogo | 2–2 | Cruzeiro |

Maracanã, Rio de Janeiro

3 December 1969
16:00 UTC−03:00

| Cruzeiro | 1–1 | Palmeiras |

Mineirão, Belo Horizonte

3 December 1969
16:00 UTC−03:00

| Corinthians | 1–0 | Botafogo |

Pacaembu, São Paulo

7 December 1969
16:00 UTC−03:00

| Palmeiras | 3–1 | Botafogo |

Pacaembu, São Paulo

7 December 1969
16:00 UTC−03:00

| Cruzeiro | 2–1 | Corinthians |

Mineirão, Belo Horizonte

Torneio Roberto Gomes Pedrosa (Série A)
1969 champions

4th title
