= 1972 Campeonato Brasileiro Série A =

Football tournament edition

Campeonato Brasileiro Série A
- Season: 1972
- Dates: 9 September 1972 – 23 December 1972
- Champions: Palmeiras (5th title)
- Copa Libertadores: Palmeiras; Botafogo
- Matches: 352
- Goals: 731 (2.08 per match)
- Top goalscorer: Pedro Rocha (São Paulo); Dario (Atlético Mineiro) - 17 goals
- Biggest home win: Atlético Mineiro 5-0 Vitória (October 8, 1972)
- Biggest away win: Náutico 0-6 São Paulo (November 5, 1972); Flamengo 0-6 Botafogo (November 15, 1972)
- Average attendance: 17,594

The 1972 Campeonato Brasileiro Série A (officially the Segundo Campeonato Brasileiro de Clubes) was the 17th edition of the Campeonato Brasileiro Série A.

== Overview ==
The championship had 26 teams, and Palmeiras won the championship. The championship had four phases.

- The First Phase saw the twenty-six teams divided into four groups: two groups of six, and two groups of seven. Despite being divided into groups, the phase was contested in a single round-robin format, with each team playing the others once. The top four teams in each group advanced to the Second Phase.
- The Second Phase saw the sixteen qualified teams divided into four groups of four. The teams within each group played each other in a single round-robin format. The top team from each group advanced to the Semifinals.
- The Semifinals were played in the form of knockout tournament, in which the winner of the match advanced to the finals. In case of a draw, the team with the best record on the championship advanced.
- The Finals were disputed using the same rules of the semifinals.

== First phase ==
=== Group A ===
Team	Pld	W	D	L	GF	GA	GD	Pts	Qualification
(Rio Grande do Sul) Internacional	25	11	12	2	34	20	+14	34	Advanced to the Second phase
(Guanabara (state)) Vasco da Gama	25	10	10	5	23	15	+8	30	Advanced to the Second phase
(São Paulo (state)) São Paulo	25	11	6	8	45	31	+14	28	Advanced to the Second phase
(Guanabara (state)) América-RJ	25	8	10	7	19	21	−2	26	Advanced to the Second phase
Bahia	25	6	11	8	16	23	−7	23	
Sergipe	25	2	5	18	14	41	−27	9	

=== Group B ===
Team	Pld	W	D	L	GF	GA	GD	Pts	Qualification
(São Paulo (state)) Palmeiras	25	14	8	3	39	15	+24	36	Advanced to the Second phase
(Paraná (state)) Coritiba	25	12	9	4	34	17	+17	33	Advanced to the Second phase
(Minas Gerais) Cruzeiro	25	12	9	4	37	20	+17	33	Advanced to the Second phase
(Guanabara (state)) Flamengo	25	10	8	7	21	20	+1	28	Advanced to the Second phase
(Pará) Remo	25	5	15	5	21	20	+1	25	
(Pernambuco) Náutico	25	7	8	10	30	34	−4	22	
(Rio Grande do Norte) ABC	25	4	7	14	20	33	−13	15	

=== Group C ===
Team	Pld	W	D	L	GF	GA	GD	Pts	Qualification
(São Paulo (state)) Corinthians	25	11	10	4	29	24	+5	32	Advanced to the Second phase
(Minas Gerais) Atlético Mineiro	25	10	6	9	31	26	+5	26	Advanced to the Second phase
(Guanabara (state)) Botafogo	25	7	11	7	30	30	0	25	Advanced to the Second phase
(Pernambuco) Santa Cruz	25	7	9	9	31	26	+5	23	Advanced to the Second phase
(Amazonas (Brazilian state)) Nacional-AM	25	4	10	11	23	31	−8	18	
(São Paulo (state)) Portuguesa	25	4	9	12	25	37	−12	17	

=== Group D ===
Team	Pld	W	D	L	GF	GA	GD	Pts	Qualification
(São Paulo (state)) Santos	25	11	9	5	31	19	+12	31	Advanced to the Second phase
(Rio Grande do Sul) Grêmio	25	10	8	7	22	26	−4	28	Advanced to the Second phase
Ceará	25	8	12	5	27	25	+2	28	Advanced to the Second phase
(Guanabara (state)) Fluminense	25	9	9	7	21	19	+2	27	Advanced to the Second phase
(Bahia) Vitória	25	6	10	9	13	26	−13	22	
(Minas Gerais) América-MG	25	3	12	10	18	28	−10	18	
(Alagoas) CRB	25	1	11	13	18	45	−27	13	

== Second phase ==
=== Group 1 ===
Team	Pld	W	D	L	GF	GA	GD	Pts	Qualification
(Rio Grande do Sul) Internacional	3	2	1	0	7	4	+3	5	Advanced to the Semifinals
(Guanabara (state)) Vasco da Gama	3	1	2	0	5	3	+2	4	
(Guanabara (state)) Flamengo	3	0	2	1	3	5	−2	2	
(Minas Gerais) Cruzeiro	3	0	1	2	4	7	−3	1	

=== Group 2 ===
Team	Pld	W	D	L	GF	GA	GD	Pts	Qualification
(São Paulo (state)) Palmeiras	3	2	0	1	6	3	+3	4	Advanced to the Semifinals
(São Paulo (state)) São Paulo	3	2	0	1	4	1	+3	4	
(Paraná (state)) Coritiba	3	1	0	2	2	6	−4	2	
(Guanabara (state)) América-RJ	3	1	0	2	3	5	−2	2	

=== Group 3 ===
Team	Pld	W	D	L	GF	GA	GD	Pts	Qualification
(São Paulo (state)) Corinthians	3	1	2	0	1	0	+1	4	Advanced to the Semifinals
(Minas Gerais) Atlético Mineiro	3	1	2	0	4	3	+1	4	
Ceará	3	0	2	1	1	2	−1	2	
(Guanabara (state)) Fluminense	3	0	2	1	2	3	−1	2	

=== Group 4 ===
Team	Pld	W	D	L	GF	GA	GD	Pts	Qualification
(Guanabara (state)) Botafogo	3	2	1	0	6	2	+4	5	Advanced to the Semifinals
(Rio Grande do Sul) Grêmio	3	1	1	1	2	2	0	3	
(São Paulo (state)) Santos	3	1	0	2	3	3	0	2	
(Pernambuco) Santa Cruz	3	1	0	2	3	7	−4	2	

== Semifinals ==
20 December 1972

Palmeiras (São Paulo (state))	1 – 1	(Rio Grande do Sul) Internacional
Nei 69'		Tovar 15'

Pacaembu, São Paulo (SP)
Attendance: 47,822
Referee: (Guanabara (state)) Arnaldo Cézar Coelho

20 December 1972

Botafogo (Guanabara (state))	2 – 1	(São Paulo (state)) Corinthians
Jairzinho 25'; Nei Conceição 83'		Lopes 8'

Maracanã, Rio de Janeiro (GB)
Attendance: 68,695
Referee: (Pernambuco) Sebastião Rufino

== Finals ==
23 December 1972

Palmeiras (São Paulo (state))	0 – 0	(Guanabara (state)) Botafogo

Morumbi, São Paulo (SP)
Attendance: 58,277
Referee: (Rio Grande do Sul) Agomar Martins

== Final standings ==
Pos	Team	Pld	W	D	L	GF	GA	GD	Pts
1	Palmeiras	30	16	10	4	46	19	+27	42
2	Botafogo	30	10	13	7	38	31	+7	33
3	Internacional	29	13	14	2	42	25	+17	40
4	Corinthians	29	12	12	5	31	26	+5	36
5	Coritiba	28	13	9	6	36	23	+13	35
6	Cruzeiro	28	12	10	6	41	27	+14	34
7	Vasco da Gama	28	11	12	5	28	18	+10	34
8	Santos	28	12	9	7	34	22	+12	33
9	São Paulo	28	13	6	9	49	32	+17	32
10	Grêmio	28	11	9	8	24	18	+6	31
11	Atlético Mineiro	28	11	8	9	35	29	+6	30
12	Flamengo	28	10	10	8	24	25	−1	30
13	Ceará	28	8	14	6	28	27	+1	30
14	Fluminense	28	9	11	8	23	22	+1	29
15	América-RJ	28	9	10	9	22	26	−4	28
16	Santa Cruz	28	8	9	11	34	43	−9	25
17	Remo	25	5	15	5	21	20	+1	25
18	Bahia	25	6	11	8	16	23	−7	23
19	Náutico	25	7	8	10	30	34	−4	22
20	Vitória	25	6	10	9	13	26	−13	22
21	Nacional-AM	25	4	10	11	23	31	−8	18
22	América Mineiro	25	3	12	10	18	28	−10	18
23	Portuguesa	25	4	9	12	25	37	−12	17
24	ABC	25	4	7	14	18	33	−15	15
25	CRB	25	1	11	13	18	45	−27	13
26	Sergipe	25	2	5	18	14	41	−27	9

Source: rsssf.com
