= 1973 Campeonato Brasileiro Série A =

Campeonato Brasileiro Série A
- Season: 1973
- Dates: 25 August 1973 – 20 February 1974
- Champions: Palmeiras (6th title)
- Copa Libertadores: Palmeiras; São Paulo
- Matches: 656
- Goals: 1,267 (1.93 per match)
- Top goalscorer: Ramón (Santa Cruz) - 21 goals
- Biggest home win: Rio Negro 5-0 Sergipe (October 21, 1973); Remo 5-0 Moto Club (December 2, 1973); Cruzeiro 6-1 Vitória (January 26, 1974); Botafogo 6-1 Fortaleza (February 6, 1974)
- Biggest away win: América-RN 1-6 Santos (September 26, 1973); Tiradentes 0-5 Palmeiras (February 3, 1974)
- Average attendance: 15,460

The 1973 Campeonato Brasileiro Série A, (officially the Terceiro Campeonato Nacional de Clubes) was the 18th edition of the Campeonato Brasileiro Série A.

== Overview ==
40 teams took part and Palmeiras won the championship.

- The First Phase was contested in two turns. In the first, the forty teams were divided into two groups of twenty. Each team played once against the teams of its own group. In the second turn, the forty teams were divided into four groups of ten teams, and once again, the teams played only against the teams of their own group. The twenty best teams considering both first and second turns qualified to the Second phase.
- The Second Phase saw the twenty qualified teams divided into two groups of ten. The teams within each group played each other in a single round-robin format. The two top teams from each group advanced to the Final phase.
- The Final phase saw the four qualified teams play each other in a single round-robin tournament. The team with the most points won the Championship.

== First phase ==
=== First turn ===
==== Group A ====
Pos	Team	Pld	W	D	L	GF	GA	GD	Pts
1	Internacional	19	10	5	4	19	11	+8	25
2	Cruzeiro	19	9	7	3	21	12	+9	25
3	Corinthians	19	9	7	3	21	13	+8	25
4	São Paulo	19	8	9	2	22	10	+12	25
5	Coritiba	19	10	4	5	23	11	+12	24
6	Botafogo	19	8	8	3	21	10	+11	24
7	Fortaleza	19	7	9	3	21	15	+6	23
8	Bahia	19	7	8	4	17	11	+6	22
9	Guarani	19	6	10	3	24	18	+6	22
10	América-MG	19	6	9	4	16	10	+6	21
11	Nacional-AM	19	4	13	2	17	15	+2	21
12	Fluminense	19	7	6	6	18	16	+2	20
13	Tiradentes	19	6	7	6	12	12	0	19
14	Figueirense	19	4	8	7	11	16	−5	16
15	CEUB	19	5	4	10	15	20	−5	14
16	Sport	19	5	4	10	16	28	−12	14
17	América-RJ	19	3	8	8	11	19	−8	14
18	CRB	19	3	4	12	12	28	−16	10
19	Moto Club	19	1	8	10	7	28	−21	10
20	Paysandu	19	1	4	14	11	32	−21	6

==== Group B ====
Pos	Team	Pld	W	D	L	GF	GA	GD	Pts
1	Palmeiras	19	13	6	0	24	4	+20	32
2	Grêmio	19	11	7	1	23	6	+17	29
3	Goiás	19	9	6	4	24	11	+13	24
4	Santos	19	8	6	5	27	16	+11	22
5	Vitória	19	7	7	5	16	12	+4	21
6	Portuguesa	19	6	8	5	29	20	+9	20
7	Vasco da Gama	19	6	8	5	18	13	+5	20
8	Atlético-PR	19	7	5	7	14	15	−1	19
9	Atlético Mineiro	19	6	7	6	21	18	+3	19
10	Rio Negro	19	6	7	6	17	14	+3	19
11	Santa Cruz	19	5	8	6	15	25	−10	18
12	Ceará	19	4	10	5	12	16	−4	18
13	América-RN	19	5	7	7	22	28	−6	17
14	Olaria	19	5	6	8	15	16	−1	16
15	Desportiva	19	5	6	8	12	14	−2	16
16	Comercial de Campo Grande	19	5	6	8	16	25	−9	16
17	Remo	19	7	1	11	10	21	−11	15
18	Flamengo	19	6	3	10	18	24	−6	15
19	Náutico	19	5	4	10	15	26	−11	14
20	Sergipe	19	3	4	12	6	30	−24	10

=== Second turn ===
==== Group 1 ====
Pos	Team	Pld	W	D	L	GF	GA	GD	Pts
1	América-MG	9	5	4	0	14	6	+8	14
2	Flamengo	9	5	1	3	13	10	+3	11
3	Cruzeiro	9	4	3	2	13	10	+3	11
4	Vasco da Gama	9	4	3	2	9	7	+2	11
5	Atlético Mineiro	9	4	2	3	13	11	+2	10
6	Olaria	9	2	4	3	12	13	−1	8
7	Botafogo	9	2	3	4	8	10	−2	7
8	Fluminense	9	2	3	4	7	9	−2	7
9	Figueirense	9	1	4	4	4	13	−9	6
10	América-RJ	9	2	1	6	11	15	−4	5

==== Group 2 ====
Pos	Team	Pld	W	D	L	GF	GA	GD	Pts
1	Santos	9	5	3	1	12	4	+8	13
2	Palmeiras	9	5	1	3	10	7	+3	11
3	Guarani	9	4	3	2	10	6	+4	11
4	Grêmio	9	4	3	2	5	7	−2	11
5	São Paulo	9	2	6	1	7	6	+1	10
6	Coritiba	9	4	1	4	10	9	+1	9
7	Internacional	9	2	4	3	7	9	−2	8
8	Corinthians	9	1	4	4	8	11	−3	6
9	Atlético-PR	9	1	4	4	6	9	−3	6
10	Portuguesa	9	1	3	5	4	11	−7	5

==== Group 3 ====
Pos	Team	Pld	W	D	L	GF	GA	GD	Pts
1	Ceará	9	5	3	1	14	7	+7	13
2	Vitória	9	5	3	1	7	2	+5	13
3	Fortaleza	9	3	6	0	11	4	+7	12
4	Tiradentes	9	4	3	2	9	7	+2	11
5	América-RN	9	4	1	4	11	8	+3	9
6	CRB	9	3	3	3	11	15	−4	9
7	Bahia	9	3	2	4	12	11	+1	8
8	Nacional-AM	9	3	1	5	11	15	−4	7
9	Rio Negro	9	1	3	5	3	7	−4	5
10	Sergipe	9	1	1	7	5	18	−13	3

==== Group 4 ====
Pos	Team	Pld	W	D	L	GF	GA	GD	Pts
1	Remo	9	4	4	1	15	7	+8	12
2	Santa Cruz	9	4	4	1	15	8	+7	12
3	Comercial-MS	9	4	2	3	14	11	+3	10
4	Goiás	9	3	4	2	8	5	+3	10
5	Desportiva	9	3	3	3	8	8	0	9
6	Sport	9	2	5	2	8	8	0	9
7	CEUB	9	3	2	4	8	13	−5	8
8	Náutico	9	2	4	3	5	7	−2	8
9	Paysandu	9	2	4	3	7	10	−3	8
10	Moto Club	9	0	4	5	4	15	−11	4

=== Final standings ===
Pos	Team	Pld	W	D	L	GF	GA	GD	Pts	Qualification
1	Palmeiras	28	18	7	3	34	11	+23	43	Qualified to Second phase
2	Grêmio	28	15	10	3	28	13	+15	40	Qualified to Second phase
3	Cruzeiro	28	13	10	5	34	22	+12	36	Qualified to Second phase
4	Santos	28	13	9	6	39	20	+19	35	Qualified to Second phase
5	América-MG	28	11	13	4	30	16	+14	35	Qualified to Second phase
6	São Paulo	28	10	15	3	29	16	+13	35	Qualified to Second phase
7	Fortaleza	28	10	15	3	32	19	+13	35	Qualified to Second phase
8	Goiás	28	12	10	6	32	16	+16	34	Qualified to Second phase
9	Vitória	28	12	10	6	23	14	+9	34	Qualified to Second phase
10	Coritiba	28	14	5	9	33	20	+13	33	Qualified to Second phase
11	Internacional	28	12	9	7	26	20	+6	33	Qualified to Second phase
12	Guarani	28	10	13	5	34	24	+10	33	Qualified to Second phase
13	Botafogo	28	10	11	7	29	20	+9	31	Qualified to Second phase
14	Vasco da Gama	28	10	11	7	27	20	+7	31	Qualified to Second phase
15	Corinthians	28	10	11	7	29	24	+5	31	Qualified to Second phase
16	Ceará	28	9	13	6	26	33	−7	31	Qualified to Second phase
17	Bahia	28	10	10	8	29	22	+7	30	Qualified to Second phase
18	Tiradentes	28	10	10	8	21	19	+2	30	Qualified to Second phase
19	Santa Cruz	28	9	12	7	30	33	−3	30	Qualified to Second phase
20	Atlético Mineiro	28	10	9	9	34	29	+5	29	Qualified to Second phase
21	Nacional-AM	28	7	14	7	28	30	−2	28	
22	Remo	28	11	5	12	25	28	−3	27	
23	Fluminense	28	9	9	10	25	25	0	27	
24	Flamengo	28	11	4	13	31	34	−3	26	
25	América-RN	28	9	8	11	33	36	−3	26	
26	Comercial-MS	28	9	8	11	30	36	−6	26	
27	Desportiva	28	8	9	11	20	22	−2	25	
28	Atlético-PR	28	8	9	11	20	24	−4	25	
29	Portuguesa	28	7	11	10	33	31	+2	25	
30	Rio Negro	28	7	10	11	20	21	−1	24	
31	Olaria	28	7	10	11	27	29	−2	24	
32	Sport	28	7	9	12	24	36	−12	23	
33	CEUB	28	8	6	14	23	33	−10	22	
34	Náutico	28	7	8	13	20	33	−13	22	
35	Figueirense	28	5	12	11	15	29	−14	22	
36	CRB	28	6	7	15	23	43	−20	19	
37	América-RJ	28	5	9	14	22	34	−12	19	
38	Paysandu	28	3	8	17	18	42	−24	14	
39	Moto Club	28	1	12	15	11	43	−32	14	
40	Sergipe	28	4	5	19	11	48	−37	13	

== Second phase ==
=== Group 1 ===
Pos	Team	Pld	W	D	L	GF	GA	GD	Pts	Qualification
1	Palmeiras	9	5	4	0	15	1	+14	14	Qualified to Final phase
2	Internacional	9	4	4	1	8	5	+3	12	Qualified to Final phase
3	Atlético Mineiro	9	4	4	1	9	6	+3	12	
4	Coritiba	9	3	4	2	8	6	+2	10	
5	Corinthians	9	3	4	2	8	6	+2	10	
6	América-MG	9	4	1	4	13	11	+2	9	
7	Vasco da Gama	9	3	3	3	10	8	+2	9	
8	Bahia	9	1	6	2	9	10	−1	8	
9	Tiradentes	9	1	3	5	3	14	−11	5	
10	Ceará	9	0	1	8	5	21	−16	1	

=== Group 2 ===
Pos	Team	Pld	W	D	L	GF	GA	GD	Pts	Qualification
1	São Paulo	9	6	2	1	13	4	+9	14	Qualified to Final phase
2	Cruzeiro	9	5	4	0	13	4	+9	14	Qualified to Final phase
3	Botafogo	9	5	2	2	18	10	+8	12	
4	Grêmio	9	5	1	3	6	6	0	11	
5	Santos	9	4	3	2	17	9	+8	11	
6	Santa Cruz	9	3	2	4	9	13	−4	8	
7	Vitória	9	3	1	5	9	16	−7	7	
8	Guarani	9	2	2	5	8	14	−6	6	
9	Goiás	9	1	4	4	10	12	−2	6	
10	Fortaleza	9	0	1	8	6	21	−15	1	

== Final phase ==
Team	Pld	W	D	L	GF	GA	GD	Pts	Qualification
(São Paulo (state)) Palmeiras	3	2	1	0	3	1	+2	5	Qualified to the 1974 Copa Libertadores
(São Paulo (state)) São Paulo	3	1	1	1	4	2	+2	3	Qualified to the 1974 Copa Libertadores
(Minas Gerais) Cruzeiro	3	1	0	2	1	2	−1	2	
(Rio Grande do Sul) Internacional	3	1	0	2	3	6	−3	2	

== Final standings ==
Pos	Team	Pld	W	D	L	GF	GA	GD	Pts
1	Palmeiras	40	25	12	3	52	13	+39	62
2	São Paulo	40	17	18	5	46	22	+24	52
3	Cruzeiro	40	19	14	7	48	28	+20	52
4	Internacional	40	17	13	10	37	31	+6	47
5	Grêmio	37	20	11	6	34	19	+15	51
6	Santos	37	17	12	8	56	29	+27	46
7	América Mineiro	37	15	14	8	43	27	+16	44
8	Coritiba	37	17	9	11	41	26	+15	43
9	Botafogo	37	15	13	9	47	30	+17	43
10	Vitória	37	15	11	11	32	30	+2	41
11	Atlético Mineiro	37	14	13	10	43	35	+8	41
12	Corinthians	37	13	15	9	37	30	+7	41
13	Goiás	37	13	14	10	42	28	+14	40
14	Vasco da Gama	37	13	14	10	37	28	+9	40
15	Guarani	37	12	15	10	42	38	+4	39
16	Santa Cruz	37	12	14	11	39	46	−7	38
17	Bahia	37	11	16	10	38	32	+6	38
18	Fortaleza	37	10	16	11	38	40	−2	36
19	Tiradentes	37	11	13	13	24	33	−9	35
20	Ceará	37	9	14	14	31	44	−13	32
21	Nacional-AM	28	7	14	7	28	30	−2	28
22	Remo	28	11	5	12	25	28	−3	27
23	Fluminense	28	9	9	10	25	25	0	27
24	Flamengo	28	11	4	13	31	34	−3	26
25	América de Natal	28	9	8	11	33	36	−3	26
26	Comercial-MS	28	9	8	11	30	36	−6	26
27	Desportiva Capixaba	28	8	9	11	20	22	−2	25
28	Atlético Paranaense	28	8	9	11	20	24	−4	25
29	Portuguesa	28	7	11	10	33	31	+2	25
30	Rio Negro	28	7	10	11	20	21	−1	24
31	Olaria	28	7	10	11	27	29	−2	24
32	Sport	28	7	9	12	24	36	−12	23
33	CEUB	28	8	6	14	23	33	−10	22
34	Náutico	28	7	8	13	20	33	−13	22
35	Figueirense	28	5	12	11	15	29	−14	22
36	CRB	28	6	7	15	23	43	−20	19
37	América-RJ	28	5	9	14	22	34	−12	19
38	Paysandu	28	3	8	17	18	42	−24	14
39	Moto Club	28	1	12	15	11	43	−32	14
40	Sergipe	28	4	5	19	11	48	−37	13
