= List of SE Palmeiras managers =

The following is a list of Sociedade Esportiva Palmeiras managers.

- (Italy) Attilio Fresia (1920–21)
- (Brazil) Sílvio Lagreca (1922–23)
- (Brazil) Amílcar Barbuy (1924–29)
- (Hungary) Jenő Medgyessy (1929)
- (Brazil) Humberto Cabelli (1930–34)
- (Uruguay) Carlos Viola (1935)
- (Uruguay) Ramón Platero (1935)
- (Uruguay) Ventura Cambón (1936)
- (Italy) Matturio Fabbi (1936–37)
- (Brazil) Joaquim Loureiro (1938)
- (Uruguay) Ramón Platero (1938–39)
- (Brazil) Ângelo Mastrandrea (1939)
- (Italy) Gaetano De Domenico (1940–41)
- (Brazil) Mário Minervino (1942)
- (Brazil) Armando Del Debbio (1942–44)
- (Brazil) Bianco Gambini (1944)
- (Uruguay) Ventura Cambón (1944)
- (Brazil) Osvaldo Brandão (1945)
- (Uruguay) Conrado Ross (1946)
- (Brazil) José Junqueira de Oliveira (1946)
- (Uruguay) Ventura Cambón (1947)
- (Brazil) Osvaldo Brandão (1947–48)
- (Uruguay) Felix Magno (1948)
- (Brazil) Cláudio Cardoso (1948)
- (Uruguay) Ventura Cambón (1949)
- (Argentina) Jim López (1950)
- (Uruguay) Ventura Cambón (1950–51)
- (Argentina) Abel Picabéa (1952)
- (Brazil) Cláudio Cardoso (1952–53)
- (Brazil) Juvenal Amarijo (1953)
- (Uruguay) Ondino Viera (1953)
- (Brazil) Cláudio Cardoso (1954)
- (Brazil) Aymoré Moreira (1954–57)
- (Uruguay) Ventura Cambón (1957)
- (Brazil) Mário Vianna (1957–58)
- (Brazil) Canhotinho (1958)
- (Brazil) Osvaldo Brandão (1959–60)
- (Argentina) Armando Renganeschi (1961)
- (Brazil) Maurício Assumpção (1962)
- (Brazil) Ephigênio de Freitas (1962–63)
- (Brazil) Mário Travaglini (1963)
- (Brazil) Sylvio Pirillo (1963)
- (Brazil) Mário Travaglini (1964)
- (Argentina) Filpo Núñez (1964–65)
- (Brazil) Mário Travaglini (1965–66)
- (Paraguay) Manuel Fleitas Solich (1966)
- (Brazil) Aymoré Moreira (1967)
- (Brazil) Mário Travaglini (1967–68)
- (Brazil) Julinho Botelho (1968)
- (Argentina) Filpo Núñez (1968–69)
- (Brazil) Rubens Minelli (1969–71)
- (Brazil) Mário Travaglini (1971)
- (Brazil) Osvaldo Brandão (1971–75)
- (Brazil) Valdir de Moraes (1975)
- (Brazil) Dino Sani (1975–1976)
- (Brazil) Dudu (1976–77)
- (Brazil) Hélio Maffia (1977)
- (Brazil) Jorge Vieira (1977–78)
- (Brazil) Valdir de Moraes (1978)
- (Argentina) Filpo Núñez (1978–79)
- (Brazil) Telê Santana (1979 – 1982)
- (Brazil) Osvaldo Brandão (1980)
- (Brazil) Rubens Minelli (1982 – 1983)
- (Brazil) Mário Travaglini (1984 – 1985)
- (Brazil) Chinesinho (1985)
- (Brazil) Jair Pereira (1990)
- (Brazil) Dudu (1990)
- (Brazil) Rubens Minelli (1987 – 1988)
- (Brazil) Dudu (1990 – 1991)
- (Brazil) Telê Santana (1990)
- (Brazil) Marcos Falopa (1990)
- (Brazil) Paulo César Carpegiani (1991)
- (Brazil) Nelsinho Baptista (1991 – 1992)
- (Brazil) Otacílio Gonçalves (1992 – 1993)
- (Brazil) Vanderlei Luxemburgo (1993 – 1994)
- (Brazil) Valdir Espinosa (1995)
- (Brazil) Carlos Alberto Silva (1995)
- (Brazil) Vanderlei Luxemburgo (1995 – 1996)
- (Brazil) Márcio Araújo (1997)
- (Brazil) Luiz Felipe Scolari (1 January 1998 – 30 June 2000)
- (Brazil) Flávio Murtosa (30 June 2000 – 2000)
- (Brazil) Marco Aurélio (2000 – 2001)
- (Brazil) Márcio Araújo (2001)
- (Brazil) Celso Roth (2001)
- (Brazil) Vanderlei Luxemburgo (2002)
- (Brazil) Paulo César Gusmão (2002)
- (Brazil) Flávio Murtosa (2002)
- (Brazil) Levir Culpi (2002 – 31 December 2002)
- (Brazil) Jair Picerni (January 2003 – May 2004)
- (Brazil) Estevam Soares (25 May 2004 – 5 February 2005)
- (Brazil) Candinho (5 February 2005 – 21 April 2005)
- (Brazil) Paulo Bonamigo (21 April 2005 – 17 July 2005)
- (Brazil) Émerson Leão (18 July 2005 – 4 April 2006)
- (Brazil) Marcelo Vilar (4 April 2006 – 17 May 2006)
- (Brazil) Tite (17 May 2006 – 22 September 2006)
- (Brazil) Jair Picerni (22 September 2006 – 9 December 2006)
- (Brazil) Caio Júnior (9 December 2006 – 17 December 2007)
- (Brazil) Vanderlei Luxemburgo (1 January 2008 – 27 June 2009)
- (Brazil) Jorginho (27 June 2009 – 21 July 2009)
- (Brazil) Muricy Ramalho (21 July 2009 – 18 February 2010)
- (Brazil) Antônio Carlos Zago (19 February 2010 – 18 May 2010)
- (Brazil) Jorge Parraga (18 May 2010 – 13 June 2010)
- (Brazil) Luiz Felipe Scolari (13 June 2010 – 13 September 2012)
- (Brazil) Narciso (13 September 2012 – 19 September 2012)
- (Brazil) Gilson Kleina (19 September 2012 – 8 May 2014)
- (Brazil) Alberto Valentim (May 2014)
- (Argentina) Ricardo Gareca (May 2014 – August 2014)
- (Brazil) Alberto Valentim (August 2014)
- (Brazil) Dorival Júnior (August 2014 – December 2014)
- (Brazil) Oswaldo de Oliveira (January 2015 – 9 June 2015)
- (Brazil) Alberto Valentim (9 June 2015 – 15 June 2015)
- (Brazil) Marcelo Oliveira (15 June 2015 – 12 March 2016)
- (Brazil) Cuca (12 March 2016 – 11 December 2016)
- (Brazil) Eduardo Baptista (11 December 2016 – 4 May 2017)
- (Brazil) Cuca (10 May 2017 – 13 October 2017)
- (Brazil) Alberto Valentim (13 October 2017– 5 December 2017)
- (Brazil) Roger Machado (22 November 2017– 26 July 2018)
- (Brazil) Luiz Felipe Scolari (27 July 2018– 2 September 2019)
- (Brazil) Mano Menezes (4 September 2019– 2 December 2019)
- (Brazil) Andrey Lopes (2 December 2019 – 15 December 2019)
- (Brazil) Vanderlei Luxemburgo (15 December 2019 – 14 October 2020)
- (Brazil) Andrey Lopes (14 October 2020 – 30 October 2020)
- (Portugal) Abel Ferreira (30 October 2020 – Present)

== Managers with official honours ==
Name	Nation	Tenure	Honours
Amílcar Barbuy	BRA	1924–29	Campeonato Paulista: 2 (1926, 1927)
Humberto Cabelli	BRA	1930–34	Campeonato Paulista: 3 (1932, 1933, 1934); Torneio Rio-São Paulo: 1 (1933)
Matturio Fabbi	ITA	1936–37	Campeonato Paulista: 1 (1936)
Gaetano De Domenico	ITA	1940–41	Campeonato Paulista: 1 (1940)
Armando Del Debbio	BRA	1942–44, 1945	Campeonato Paulista: 1 (1942)
Bianco Gambini	BRA	1944	Campeonato Paulista: 1 (1944)
Osvaldo Brandão	BRA	1945, 1947–48, 1958–60, 1971–75	Campeonato Paulista: 4 (1947, 1959, 1972, 1974); Taça Brasil: 1 (1960); Campeonato Brasileiro: 2 (1972, 1973)
Ventura Cambón	URU	1936, 1944, 1947, 1949, 1950–51, 1957	Campeonato Paulista: 1 (1950); Torneio Rio-São Paulo: 1 (1951); Copa Rio: 1 (1951)
Sylvio Pirillo	BRA	1963–64	Campeonato Paulista: 1 (1963)
Filpo Nuñez	ARG	1964–65, 1968–69, 1978–79	Torneio Rio-São Paulo: 1 (1965)
Mário Travaglini	BRA	1963, 1964, 1965–66, 1967–68, 1971, 1984, 1985	Campeonato Paulista: 1 (1966); Taça Brasil: 1 (1967)
Aymoré Moreira	BRA	1954–57, 1967	Torneio Roberto Gomes Pedrosa: 1 (1967)
Rubens Minelli	BRA	1969–71, 1982–83, 1987–88	Torneio Roberto Gomes Pedrosa: 1 (1969)
Dudu	BRA	1976–77, 1981, 1990–91	Campeonato Paulista: 1 (1976)
Vanderlei Luxemburgo	BRA	1993–94, 1995–96, 2002, 2008–09, 2019–20	Campeonato Paulista: 5 (1993, 1994, 1996, 2008, 2020); Torneio Rio-São Paulo: 1 (1993); Campeonato Brasileiro: 2 (1993, 1994)
Luiz Felipe Scolari	BRA	1997–00, 2010–12, 2018–19	Copa do Brasil: 2 (1998, 2012); Copa Mercosur: 1 (1998); Copa Libertadores: 1 (1999); Torneio Rio-São Paulo: 1 (2000); Campeonato Brasileiro: 1 (2018)
Flávio Murtosa	BRA	2000	Copa dos Campeões: 1 (2000)
Jair Picerni	BRA	2003–04, 2006	Campeonato Brasileiro Série B: 1 (2003)
Gilson Kleina	BRA	2012–14	Campeonato Brasileiro Série B: 1 (2013)
Marcelo Oliveira	BRA	2015–16	Copa do Brasil: 1 (2015)
Cuca	BRA	2016, 2017	Campeonato Brasileiro: 1 (2016)
Abel Ferreira	POR	2020–	Copa Libertadores: 2 (2020, 2021); Copa do Brasil: 1 (2020); Recopa Sudamericana: 1 (2022); Campeonato Paulista: 4 (2022, 2023, 2024, 2026); Campeonato Brasileiro: 2 (2022, 2023); Supercopa do Brasil: 1 (2023)
