= Torneio Prefeito Lineu Prestes =

1950 Torneio Prefeito Lineu Prestes
Tournament details
- Country: Brazil
- Dates: May 18 – June 1
- Teams: 4

Final positions
- Champions: São Paulo
- Runners-up: Corinthians
- Third place: Portuguesa
- Fourth place: Palmeiras

Tournament statistics
- Matches played: 6
- Goals scored: 16 (2.67 per match)
- Top goal scorer(s): Elmo Bovio (São Paulo); 3 goals

The Torneio Prefeito Lineu Prestes (English: Lineu Prestes Mayor Tournament) was a tournament organized by Federação Paulista de Futebol (FPF) realized in 1950, with the objective of checking the last preparations for the Estádio do Pacaembu, which was to host the 1950 FIFA World Cup matches. The competition name is in honor of Lineu Prestes, the incumbent mayor of São Paulo in 1950. The tournament was also worth the Troféu Newton Sá e Silva (English: Newton Sá e Silva Trophy), in honor of the administrator of the Pacaembu stadium.

The four main teams in the capital were invited to the dispute: SC Corinthians, Palmeiras, Portuguesa and São Paulo. The contest format was a simple round-robin.

== Matches ==
May 18

Corinthians	1–1	Palmeiras
Noronha 73'	Report	Yeso 35'

Estadio do Pacaembu, São Paulo
Referee: Amaral Sobrinho

May 21

São Paulo	2–1	Corinthians
Bovio 18', 43'	Report	Nelsinho 10'

Estadio do Pacaembu, São Paulo
Referee: Agnelo Leonardi

May 24

São Paulo	0–0	Palmeiras
	Report

Estadio do Pacaembu, São Paulo
Referee: João Gambeta

May 24

Corinthians	2–1	Portuguesa
Nelsinho 11'; Luizinho 20'	Report	Renato 65'

Estadio do Pacaembu, São Paulo
Referee: Mário Gardelli

May 28

Portuguesa	0–4	São Paulo
	Report	Leopoldo 8'; Augusto 18'; Ponce de León 31'; Bovio 79'

Estadio do Pacaembu, São Paulo
Referee: Amletto Ricciarelli

Jun 1

Portuguesa	3–1	Palmeiras
Pinga 58'; Djalma Santos 74' (pen.); Simão 80'	Report	Aquiles 12'

Estadio do Pacaembu, São Paulo
Referee: Mário Gardelli

== Final standings ==
Team	Pts	P	W	D	L	GF	GA	GD
São Paulo	5	3	2	1	0	4	6	1
Corinthians	3	3	1	1	1	4	4	0
Portuguesa	2	3	1	0	2	4	7	-3
Palmeiras	2	3	0	2	1	2	4	-2

== Champion ==
1950 Torneio Prefeito Lineu Prestes
(São Paulo (state))
São Paulo
1st title
