= 1960 Campeonato Paulista =

Campeonato Paulista – Série A1
- Season: 1960
- Champions: Santos
- Relegated: América; Corinthians (PP); Ponte Preta
- Taça Brasil: Santos
- Matches: 312
- Goals: 1,069 (3.43 per match)
- Best Player: Pelé (Santos)
- Top goalscorer: Pelé (Santos) – 32 goals
- Biggest home win: Santos 7-0 América (October 16, 1960)
- Biggest away win: Corinthians 1-6 Santos (November 30, 1960); Taubaté 1-6 Santos (December 4, 1960)
- Highest scoring: Santos 8-3 Jabaquara (July 27, 1960)

The 1960 Campeonato Paulista da Divisão Especial, organized by the Federação Paulista de Futebol, was the 59th season of São Paulo's top professional football league. Santos won the title for the 5th time. América, Corinthians (PP) and Ponte Preta were relegated. For the fourth consecutive year, the top scorer was Santos's Pelé with 34 goals.

== Championship ==
The championship was disputed in a double-round robin system, with the team with the most points winning the title and the team with the fewest points being relegated. Aside of that, the three teams directly above the last-placed team would dispute a playoff to define the other two relegation berths.

Pos	Team	Pld	W	D	L	GF	GA	GD	Pts	Qualification or relegation
1	Santos	34	22	6	6	100	44	+56	50	Champions
2	Portuguesa	34	22	4	8	74	51	+23	48	
3	Corinthians	34	19	6	9	57	43	+14	44	
4	Palmeiras	34	16	10	8	63	48	+15	42	
5	Noroeste	34	17	6	11	63	46	+17	40	
6	Ferroviária	34	16	7	11	72	51	+21	39	
7	Guarani	34	14	10	10	59	52	+7	38	
8	São Paulo	34	13	11	10	74	56	+18	37	
9	XV de Piracicaba	34	11	11	12	50	48	+2	33	
10	Botafogo	34	13	7	14	52	59	−7	33	
11	Comercial	34	13	5	16	57	64	−7	31	
12	Taubaté	34	12	6	16	44	76	−32	30	
13	Portuguesa Santista	34	12	4	18	45	53	−8	28	
14	Jabaquara	34	10	8	16	59	73	−14	28	
15	América	34	10	7	17	43	62	−19	27	Relegation Playouts
16	Juventus	34	8	8	18	52	75	−23	24	Relegation Playouts
17	Corinthians (PP)	34	10	3	21	44	70	−26	23	Relegation Playouts
18	Ponte Preta	34	4	9	21	44	81	−37	17	Relegated

Updated to match(es) played on December 18, 1960. Source: RSSSF.com
Rules for classification: 1) points; 2) goal difference; 3) wins; 4) number of goals scored.

=== Playouts ===
Pos	Team	Pld	W	D	L	GF	GA	GD	Pts	Qualification or relegation
1	Juventus	4	3	1	0	8	2	+6	7	
2	Corinthians (PP)	4	1	2	1	7	5	+2	4	Relegated
3	América	4	0	1	3	2	10	−8	1	Relegated

Updated to match(es) played on 1961. Source: O Caminho da Bola — Volume II, Ribeiro, Rubens. FPF, 2007, São Paulo, p. 234
Rules for classification: 1) points; 2) goal difference; 3) wins; 4) number of goals scored.

== Top Scores ==
Rank	Player	Club	Goals
1	Pelé	Santos	32
2	Sílvio	Portuguesa	27
3	Nilo	XV de Piracicaba	24
4	Gino	São Paulo	21
4	Pepe	Santos	21
6	Baiano	Ferroviaría	20
7	Zé Carlos	Noroeste	18
7	Zeola	Juventus	18
9	Cabrita	Guaraní	17
9	Alemão	Comercial	17
11	Paulinho	Ponte Preta	15
11	Laerte	Botafogo	15
