= Fábio Crippa =

Brazilian footballer

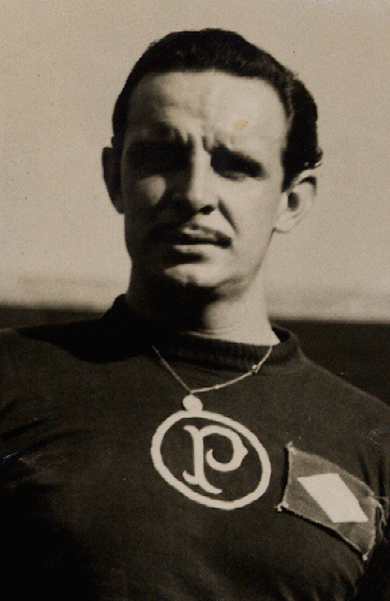

Personal information
- Full name: Fábio Crippa
- Date of birth: 18 April 1928
- Place of birth: São Paulo, Brazil
- Date of death: 23 January 2011 (aged 82)
- Place of death: São Paulo, Brazil
- Position: Goalkeeper

Senior career*
Years	Team	Apps	(Gls)
1946–1950	São Paulo Railway		
1950	São Paulo	1	(0)
1951–1956	Palmeiras	81	(0)
1953–1954	→ Ferroviária (loan)		
- * Club domestic league appearances and goals as of 6 October 2024

Fábio Crippa (18 April 1928 – 23 January 2011) was a Brazilian professional footballer who played as a goalkeeper.

== Career ==
Revealed by São Paulo Railway (currently Nacional AC da Barra Funda), Crippa played for the club until 1950, when he was hired by São Paulo FC. Without being able to be a starter, he only played in one match, in the 1950 Torneio Rio-São Paulo. In the following season, he was a starter for SE Palmeiras, becoming notable for winning the 1951 Copa Rio, one of the most important tournaments in the club's history, in addition to the Taça Cidade de São Paulo and the Torneio Rio-São Paulo. He made a total of 81 appearances for the club, as he competed for position with Oberdan Cattani during the period.

== Death ==
Crippa died on 23 January 2011 at age of 82, due to Alzheimer's disease.

== Honours ==
Palmeiras

- Copa Rio: 1951
- Taça Cidade de São Paulo: 1951
- Torneio Rio-São Paulo: 1951
