= Francisco Rodrigues (Brazilian footballer) =

Brazilian footballer (1925-1988)

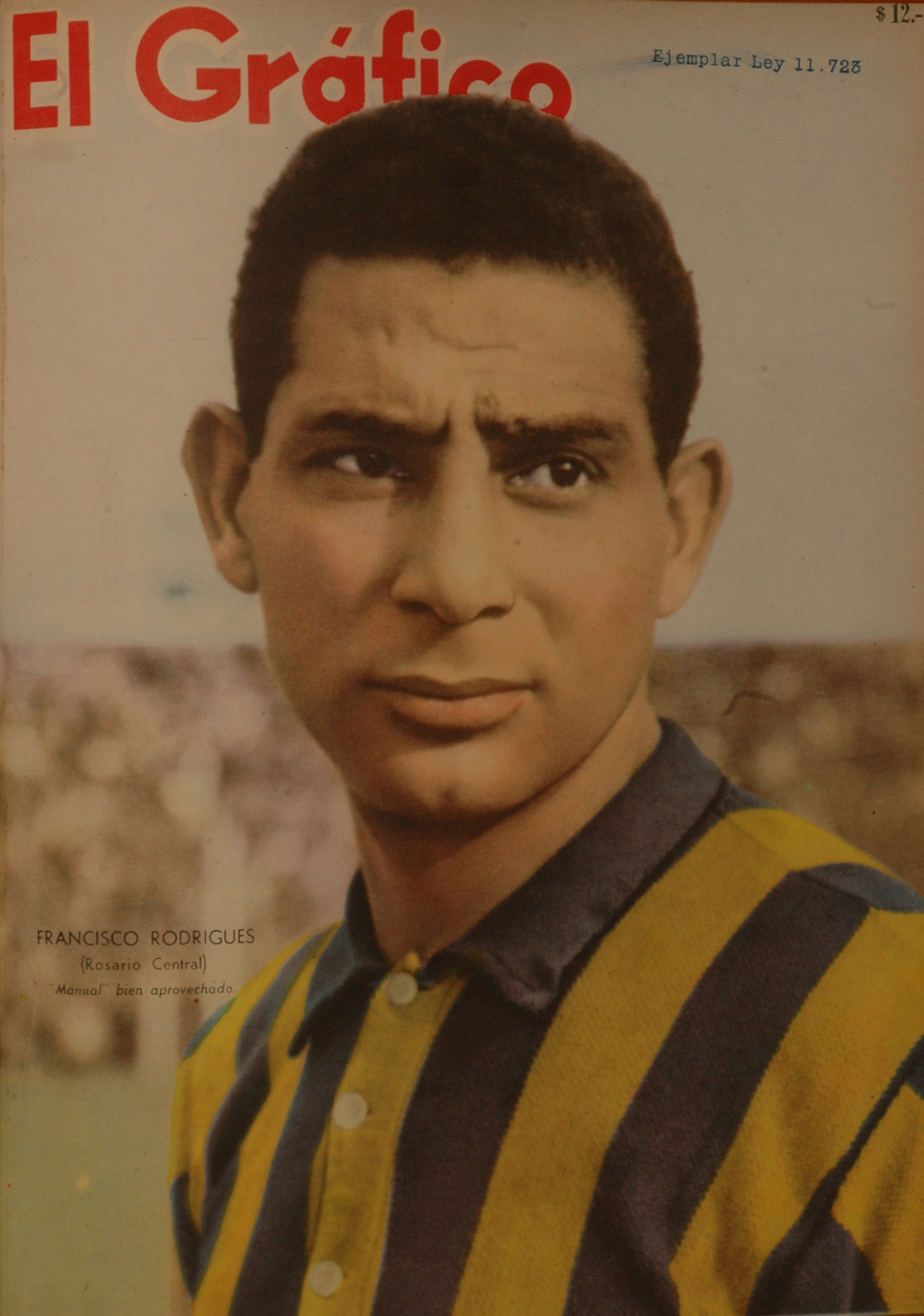
- Rodrigues as the cover of El Gráfico in 1961

Personal information
- Full name: Francisco Rodrigues
- Date of birth: 27 June 1925
- Place of birth: São Paulo, Brazil
- Date of death: 30 October 1988 (aged 63)
- Height: 1.76 m (5 ft 9 in)
- Position: Forward

Senior career*
Years	Team	Apps	(Gls)
1942–1944	Ypiranga-SP		
1945–1949	Fluminense		
1950–1954	Palmeiras		
1955	Botafogo		
1956	Palmeiras		
1957	Clube Atlético Juventus		
1958	Paulista		
1959	Clube Atlético Juventus		
1960–1961	Rosario Central	35	(10)

International career
1950–1955	Brazil	18	(5)
Medal record
Men's Football
Representing Brazil
FIFA World Cup
Runner-up	1950 Brazil
Copa América
Runner-up	1953 Peru
Panamerican Championship
Winner	1952 Chile
- * Club domestic league appearances and goals

Francisco Rodrigues, nicknamed Tatu or Rodrigues Tatu (27 June 1925 – 30 October 1988) was a Brazilian footballer.

He played for the following clubs: Ypiranga-SP, Fluminense, Palmeiras, Botafogo, Juventus, Paulista and Rosario Central (Argentina). He earned 21 caps (3 non-official) and scored 9 goals (4 non-official) for the Brazil national football team, and was part of the team at the 1950 FIFA World Cup and the 1954 FIFA World Cup.

== Honours ==
Palmeiras

- Campeonato Paulista: 1950
- Torneio Rio-São Paulo: 1951
- Copa Rio: 1951

Fluminense

- Campeonato Carioca: 1946

Brazil

- Panamerican Championship: 1952
- FIFA World Cup runner-up: 1950
- Copa América runner-up: 1953
