= Aírton Diogo =

Brazilian footballer

Personal information
- Full name: Aírton Diogo
- Date of birth: 23 November 1929
- Place of birth: Corumbá, Brazil
- Date of death: 28 June 2005 (aged 75)
- Place of death: Campinas, Brazil
- Position: Forward

Youth career
- –1949: Fluminense

Senior career*
Years	Team	Apps	(Gls)
1949	Fluminense		
1950–1952	Pelotas		
1953–1954	Internacional		
1955–1956	Portuguesa		
1956–1959	Ponte Preta		
1959	São Paulo		
1960	Santos		
1961–1962	Ponte Preta		
1962–1963	Pelotas		

Managerial career
- Pelotas
- Caldense
- * Club domestic league appearances and goals as of 26 February 2024

Aírton Diogo (23 November 1929 – 28 June 2005), was a Brazilian professional footballer who played as a forward.

== Career ==
Born in Corumbá, Aírton began his career at Fluminense, where he only played for the professionals in 1949. In the following years he played for EC Pelotas, and due to his good performance, he was hired by SC Internacional, where he was state champion in 1953. Transferred to Portuguesa de Desportos, he was again champion, this time of the Rio-São Paulo Tournament in 1955. He defended Ponte Preta in the following seasons, where he scored several goals in the Campeonato Paulista. He had a brief spell at São Paulo in 1959 and later at Santos, being part of the 1960 state champion squad. He ended his career playing for the clubs where he created more identification, Ponte Preta and Pelotas, clubs for which he was also coach, in addition to Caldense.

== Honours ==
Internacional

- Campeonato Gaúcho: 1953

Portuguesa

- Torneio Rio-São Paulo: 1955

Santos

- Campeonato Paulista: 1960
