= 1950 São Paulo FC season =

São Paulo
1950 season
- Chairman: Cícero Pompeu de Toledo
- Manager: Vicente Feola
- Torneio Rio-São Paulo: 6th
- Campeonato Paulista: Runners-up

The 1950 football season was São Paulo's 21st season since the club's founding in 1930.

== Overall ==
Games played	52 (7 Torneio Rio-São Paulo, 22 Campeonato Paulista, 23 Friendly match)
Games won	30 (2 Torneio Rio-São Paulo, 13 Campeonato Paulista, 15 Friendly match)
Games drawn	12 (1 Torneio Rio-São Paulo, 5 Campeonato Paulista, 6 Friendly match)
Games lost	10 (4 Torneio Rio-São Paulo, 4 Campeonato Paulista, 2 Friendly match)
Goals scored	139
Goals conceded	81
Goal difference	+58
Best result	10–0 (H) v Guarani - Campeonato Paulista - 1950.11.11
Worst result	1–4 (A) v Corinthians - Torneio Rio-São Paulo - 1949.12.28
Most appearances	
Top scorer	

Source: São Paulo FC

== Friendlies ==
January 8 National	Corinthians de Santo André	1–2	São Paulo	Santo André
	Goal		Goal	Stadium: Estádio Américo Guazzelli

February 12 National	Prudentina	4–2	São Paulo	Presidente Prudente
	Goal		Goal

April 2 National	São Paulo	2–1	Ypiranga	São Paulo
	Goal		Goal	Stadium: Estádio Palestra Itália (Parque Antarctica)

April 16 National	Guarani	3–2	São Paulo	Campinas
	Goal		Goal	Stadium: Campo do Guarani - Pastinho

April 19 National	Santos	0–4	São Paulo	Santos
			Goal	Stadium: Estádio Urbano Caldeira (Vila Belmiro)

April 22 National	Portuguesa	0–3	São Paulo	São Paulo
			Goal	Stadium: Estádio Paulo Machado de Carvalho (Pacaembu)

April 27 National	São Paulo	4–3	Grêmio	São Paulo
	Goal		Goal	Stadium: Estádio Palestra Itália (Parque Antarctica)

April 30 National	Tupã	2–4	São Paulo	Tupã
	Goal		Goal

May 1 Taça Feliz Aniversário	Bauru	1–3	São Paulo	Bauru
	Goal		Goal	Stadium: Campo do Bauru Atlético Clube

May 7 National	Ponte Preta	2–4	São Paulo	Campinas
	Goal		Goal	Stadium: Estádio Moisés Lucarelli

May 21 Torneio Lineu Prestes	São Paulo	2–1	Corinthians	São Paulo
	Goal		Goal	Stadium: Estádio Paulo Machado de Carvalho (Pacaembu)

May 24 Torneio Lineu Prestes	Palmeiras	0–0	São Paulo	São Paulo
				Stadium: Estádio Paulo Machado de Carvalho (Pacaembu)

May 28 Torneio Lineu Prestes	Portuguesa	0–4	São Paulo	São Paulo
			Goal	Stadium: Estádio Paulo Machado de Carvalho (Pacaembu)

June 3 National	Francana	3–3	São Paulo	Franca
	Goal		Goal	Stadium: Bela Vista

June 8 National	Votorantim	0–6	São Paulo	Votorantim
			Goal	Stadium: Campo do Savoia

June 8 National	Guarani	0–1	São Paulo	Campinas
			Goal

June 25 National	XV de Piracicaba	3–3	São Paulo	Piracicaba
	Goal		Goal

July 23 National	São Paulo	5–1	Fluminense	São Paulo
	Goal		Goal	Stadium: Estádio Paulo Machado de Carvalho (Pacaembu)

July 27 National	Fluminense	2–2	São Paulo	Rio de Janeiro
	Goal		Goal	Stadium: Estádio Manoel Schwartz (das Laranjeiras)

August 2 Taça Cidade de São Paulo	São Paulo	2–2	Portuguesa	São Paulo
	Goal		Goal	Stadium: Estádio Paulo Machado de Carvalho (Pacaembu)

August 6 Taça Cidade de São Paulo	Palmeiras	2–2	São Paulo	São Paulo
	Goal		Goal	Stadium: Estádio Paulo Machado de Carvalho (Pacaembu)

August 9 National	Pinhalense	0–1	São Paulo	Espírito Santo do Pinhal
			Goal

September 7 Taça Arthur Santos	Londrina XI	0–5	São Paulo	Londrina
			Goal

September 22 Taça Fernandes	Cambaraense	1–5	São Paulo	Cambará
	Goal		Goal

November 15 National	São Paulo	5–1	Botafogo	São Paulo
	Goal		Goal	Stadium: Estádio Paulo Machado de Carvalho (Pacaembu)

December 3 National	Olímpia	1–2	São Paulo	Olímpia
	Goal		Goal	Stadium: Estádio Teresa Breda

== Official competitions ==
=== Torneio Rio-São Paulo ===
December 28, 1949 1	Corinthians	4–1	São Paulo	São Paulo
	Goal		Goal	Stadium: Estádio Paulo Machado de Carvalho (Pacaembu)

January 4 2	São Paulo	5–4	Botafogo	São Paulo
	Goal		Goal	Stadium: Estádio Paulo Machado de Carvalho (Pacaembu)

January 8 3	Fluminense	3–1	São Paulo	Rio de Janeiro
	Goal		Goal	Stadium: Estádio Vasco da Gama (São Januário)

January 15 4	Portuguesa	4–3	São Paulo	São Paulo
	Goal		Goal	Stadium: Estádio Paulo Machado de Carvalho (Pacaembu)

January 21 5	Palmeiras	3–2	São Paulo	São Paulo
	Goal		Goal	Stadium: Estádio Paulo Machado de Carvalho (Pacaembu)

January 29 6	São Paulo	2–2	Vasco da Gama	São Paulo
	Goal		Goal	Stadium: Estádio Paulo Machado de Carvalho (Pacaembu)

February 4 7	Flamengo	3–4	São Paulo	Rio de Janeiro
	Goal		Goal	Stadium: Estádio Vasco da Gama (São Januário)

==== Record ====
Final Position	Points	Matches	Wins	Draws	Losses	Goals For	Goals Away	Win%
6th	5	7	2	1	4	18	23	35%

=== Campeonato Paulista ===
August 19 1	São Paulo	5–2	Nacional	São Paulo
	Goal		Goal	Stadium: Estádio Paulo Machado de Carvalho (Pacaembu)

September 3 2	Santos	3–2	São Paulo	Santos
	Goal		Goal	Stadium: Estádio Urbano Caldeira (Vila Belmiro)

September 10 3	São Paulo	5–1	Jabaquara	São Paulo
	Goal		Goal	Stadium: Estádio Paulo Machado de Carvalho (Pacaembu)

September 17 4	São Paulo	2–1	Portuguesa	São Paulo
	Goal		Goal	Stadium: Estádio Paulo Machado de Carvalho (Pacaembu)

September 23 5	Juventus	0–3	São Paulo	São Paulo
			Goal	Stadium: Estádio Conde Rodolfo Crespi (Rua Javari)

October 1 6	São Paulo	2–0	Ypiranga	São Paulo
	Goal			Stadium: Estádio Paulo Machado de Carvalho (Pacaembu)

October 8 7	XV de Piracicaba	3–3	São Paulo	Piracicaba
	Goal		Goal	Stadium: Campo da Rua Regente Feijó

October 15 8	Palmeiras	2–0	São Paulo	São Paulo
	Goal			Stadium: Estádio Paulo Machado de Carvalho (Pacaembu)

October 29 9	Portuguesa Santista	2–3	São Paulo	Santos
	Goal		Goal	Stadium: Estádio Ulrico Mursa

November 5 10	São Paulo	1–0	Corinthians	São Paulo
	Goal			Stadium: Estádio Paulo Machado de Carvalho (Pacaembu)

November 11 11	São Paulo	10–0	Guarani	São Paulo
	Goal			Stadium: Estádio Paulo Machado de Carvalho (Pacaembu)

November 19 12	Jabaquara	1–1	São Paulo	Santos
	Goal		Goal	Stadium: Estádio Ulrico Mursa

November 26 13	São Paulo	2–1	Juventus	São Paulo
	Goal		Goal	Stadium: Estádio Paulo Machado de Carvalho (Pacaembu)

December 2 14	São Paulo	2–1	Portuguesa Santista	São Paulo
	Goal		Goal	Stadium: Estádio Paulo Machado de Carvalho (Pacaembu)

December 9 15	São Paulo	3–0	XV de Piracicaba	São Paulo
	Goal			Stadium: Estádio Paulo Machado de Carvalho (Pacaembu)

December 17 16	Corinthians	1–1	São Paulo	São Paulo
	Goal		Goal	Stadium: Estádio Paulo Machado de Carvalho (Pacaembu)

December 23 17	Nacional	1–2	São Paulo	São Paulo
	Goal		Goal	Stadium: Estádio Nicolau Alayon (Comendador Sousa)

December 31 18	São Paulo	3–1	Portuguesa	São Paulo
	Goal		Goal	Stadium: Estádio Paulo Machado de Carvalho (Pacaembu)

January 7, 1951 19	Guarani	2–2	São Paulo	Campinas
	Goal		Goal	Stadium: Campo do Guarani - Pastinho

January 14, 1951 20	São Paulo	1–2	Ypiranga	São Paulo
	Goal		Goal	Stadium: Estádio Paulo Machado de Carvalho (Pacaembu)

January 21, 1951 21	São Paulo	1–2	Santos	São Paulo
	Goal		Goal	Stadium: Estádio Paulo Machado de Carvalho (Pacaembu)

January 28, 1951 22	Palmeiras	1–1	São Paulo	São Paulo
	Goal		Goal	Stadium: Estádio Paulo Machado de Carvalho (Pacaembu)

==== Record ====
Final Position	Points	Matches	Wins	Draws	Losses	Goals For	Goals Away	Win%
2nd	31	22	13	5	4	55	27	67%
