= Jurandir (footballer, born 1940) =

Brazilian footballer (1940–1996)

Personal information
- Full name: Jurandir de Freitas
- Date of birth: 12 November 1940
- Place of birth: Marília, Brazil
- Date of death: 6 March 1996 (aged 55)
- Place of death: São Paulo, Brazil
- Height: 1.90 m (6 ft 3 in)
- Position: Centre-back

Senior career*
Years	Team	Apps	(Gls)
1959	Corinthians		
1960–1961	São Bento (Marília)		
1962–1972	São Paulo	419	(0)
1972	Marília		
1973–1974	Operário		
- Amparo
- União Mogi

International career
1962	Brazil Access		
1962-1968	Brazil	15	(0)
Medal record
Men's Football
Representing Brazil
FIFA World Cup
Winner	1962 Chile
- * Club domestic league appearances and goals

Jurandir de Freitas (12 November 1940 – 6 March 1996), nicknamed Jurandir, was a Brazilian footballer who played as a centre-back.

== Club career ==
During his club career Jurandir played for Corinthians, São Bento, São Paulo, Marília, Operário-MT, Amparo-SP and União de Mogi.

== International career ==
At international level, Jurandir earned 15 caps for the Brazil national team in 1962. He was also part of the 1962 FIFA World Cup winning squad, but he did not play any matches during the tournament.

== Honours ==
São Paulo

- Campeonato Paulista: 1970, 1971

Brazil

- FIFA World Cup: 1962
- South American Access Championship: 1962
