= Brazil national access football team =

National sports team

Brazil Access
- Nickname: SeleAcesso
- Association: Confederação Brasileira de Futebol (Brazilian Football Confederation)
- Confederation: CONMEBOL (South America)
- Head coach: Sylvio Pirillo (1962); Denoni Alves (1964)
- Most caps: Various (5)
- Top scorer: Luís Carlos (5)
- Home stadium: Didn't play at home
- FIFA code: BRA
First colours	Second colours

First international
- Brazil 3–2 Chile (Lima, Peru; January 25, 1962)

Last international
- Argentina 1–1 Brazil (Buenos Aires, Argentina; February 2, 1964)

Biggest win
- Brazil 4–1 Uruguay (Buenos Aires, Argentina; January 25, 1964)

Biggest defeat
- None

South American Access Championship
- Appearances: 2 (first in 1962)
- Best result: Winners: 1962; 1964

The Brazil national access team, also known as Seleacesso, was a Brazilian football team formed in 1962 and 1964 especially for the South American Access Championship, a tournament between national teams from South America that were formed only by athletes who did not dispute their national top league level.

In Brazil, players who competed in their state level leagues were accepted.

== Titles ==
- South American Access Championship
  - Winners (2): 1962, 1964

== All matches played ==
Nº	Edition	Date	Game
1	(Peru) 1962	25 January 1962	Brazil 3-2 Chile
2	(Peru) 1962	29 January 1962	Brazil 3-2 Paraguay
3	(Peru) 1962	3 February 1962	Argentina 0-0 Brazil
4	(Peru) 1962	5 February 1962	Peru 1-3 Brazil
5	(Argentina) 1964	18 January 1964	Brazil 1-0 Peru
6	(Argentina) 1964	22 January 1964	Brazil 1-0 Paraguay
7	(Argentina) 1964	25 January 1964	Brazil 4-1 Uruguay
8	(Argentina) 1964	29 January 1964	Argentina 1-1 Brazil
9	(Argentina) 1964	2 February 1964	Argentina 1-1 Brazil

Overall
9 matches, 5 wins, 3 draws, 0 loses, 17 goals scored, 8 goals awarded (+9 difference)

== Squads ==
The following players were called up to the Brazil in each tournament. In 1962 only players from the São Paulo countryside were called up. In 1964, only players from less important clubs in Rio de Janeiro league.

From 1962 team, Jurandir and Ademar participated in senior A team friendly matches in the same year. Jurandir was called to be part of the Brazil's squad of the 1962 FIFA World Cup.

=== 1962 ===
Head coach: (Brazil) Sylvio Pirillo

Pos	Name	Club
GK	Cláudio	Portuguesa Santista
GK	Raimundinho	AA Votuporanguense
DF	Adelson	Portuguesa Santista
DF	Ambrósio	América de Rio Preto
DF	Clóvis	Portuguesa Santista
DF	Gilberto	Francana
DF	Jurandir	São Bento de Marilia
DF	Roberto Ramos	Prudentina
DF	Vicente	Prudentina
MC	Adamastor	América de Rio Preto
MC	Capitão	Prudentina
MC	Esnel	Ponte Preta
MC	Paulo Nunes	Ponte Preta
FW	Ademar	Prudentina
FW	Bibe	Ponte Preta
FW	Dirceu Carvalho	América de Rio Preto
FW	Neves	Jaboticabal
FW	Picolé	São Bento de Marilia

=== 1964 ===
Head coach: (Brazil) Denoni Alves

Pos	Name	Club
GK	Franz	São Cristóvão
GK	Aricarlos	Olaria
DF	Ari	São Cristóvão
DF	Isidoro	São Cristóvão
DF	Nesio	Olaria
DF	Waltinho	Olaria
MC	Batata	Madureira
MC	Cassimiro	Olaria
MC	Fefeu	Canto do Rio
MC	Ivo Soares	São Cristóvão
MC	Zezinho	AA Portuguesa
FW	Eltinho	São Cristóvão
FW	Enir	São Cristóvão
FW	Jair	São Cristóvão
FW	Luís Carlos	Olaria
FW	Uriel	Canto do Rio
