= Aquiles dos Reis =

Brazilian footballer (1928–2014)

Personal information
- Date of birth: 28 August 1928
- Place of birth: Miranda, Brazil
- Date of death: 9 January 2014 (aged 85)
- Place of death: Campo Grande, Brazil
- Positions: Midfielder; forward

Youth career
- Aquidauana
- Noroeste (Campo Grande)

Senior career*
Years	Team	Apps	(Gls)
1948–1949	Corinthians-PP		
1949–1954	Palmeiras	72	(39)
- * Club domestic league appearances and goals

Aquiles dos Reis (28 August 1928 – 9 January 2014) was a Brazilian professional footballer who played as a midfielder and forward.

== Career ==
Native from Miranda, Mato Grosso do Sul, Aquiles began his career in local soccer, playing for the Aquidauana and Noroeste teams. In 1948, he turned professional after passing a trial at EC Corinthians in Presidente Prudente. In 1949, he was one of the top scorers in the state's second division, attracting the attention of Palmeiras. For Palmeiras, he made 72 appearances and scored 39 goals, helping them win five titles, including being top scorer in the 1951 Rio-São Paulo Tournament. He suffered a serious injury in the semifinals of the 1951 Rio Cup and was sidelined until 1954, when he retired.

== Death ==
Aquiles dos Reis died on 9 January 2014 in the city of Campo Grande, victim of heart failure.

== Honours ==
Palmeiras

- Campeonato Paulista: 1950
- Taça Cidade de São Paulo: 1950, 1951
- Torneio Rio-São Paulo: 1951
- Copa Rio: 1951
