= Esnel =

Brazilian footballer

Personal information
- Full name: Esnel Miralha Lopes
- Date of birth: 24 May 1934
- Place of birth: Uruguaiana, Brazil
- Date of death: 17 November 2007 (aged 73)
- Place of death: Brusque, Brazil
- Position: Midfielder

Youth career
- AC Joaçaba

Senior career*
Years	Team	Apps	(Gls)
1951–1952	Inter de Lages		
1953–1956	Carlos Renaux		
1956–1957	São Paulo	10	(2)
1957–1962	Ponte Preta		
1958–1959	→ Batatais (loan)		
1960	→ Comercial-SP (loan)		
1962	Portuguesa		
1963	Ponte Preta		
1964	XV de Piracicaba		
1964	Paulista		
1965–1966	Francana		
1966	Londrina		

International career
1962	Brazil Access		
- * Club domestic league appearances and goals as of 23 February 2024

Esnel Miralha Lopes (24 May 1934 – 17 November 2007), was a Brazilian professional footballer who played as a midfielder.

== Career ==
Trained in the children's categories of the extinct AC Joaçaba, Esnel started as a professional at Inter de Lages in 1951. In 1953 he arrived at Carlos Renaux where he achieved the great feat of becoming state champion, which attracted the attention of Vicente Feola's São Paulo FC, who hired the team's cerebral central midfielder, alongside the striker Agenor. He stayed at the club for a short time, but at Ponte Preta he established himself, playing for the club for more than 6 years. He also had a quick spell at Portuguesa and was champion with the Brazilian national team in South American Access Championship in 1962.

== Honours ==
Carlos Renaux

- Campeonato Catarinense: 1953

Brazil

- South American Access Championship: 1962
