= Djalma Santos =

Brazilian footballer (1929–2013)

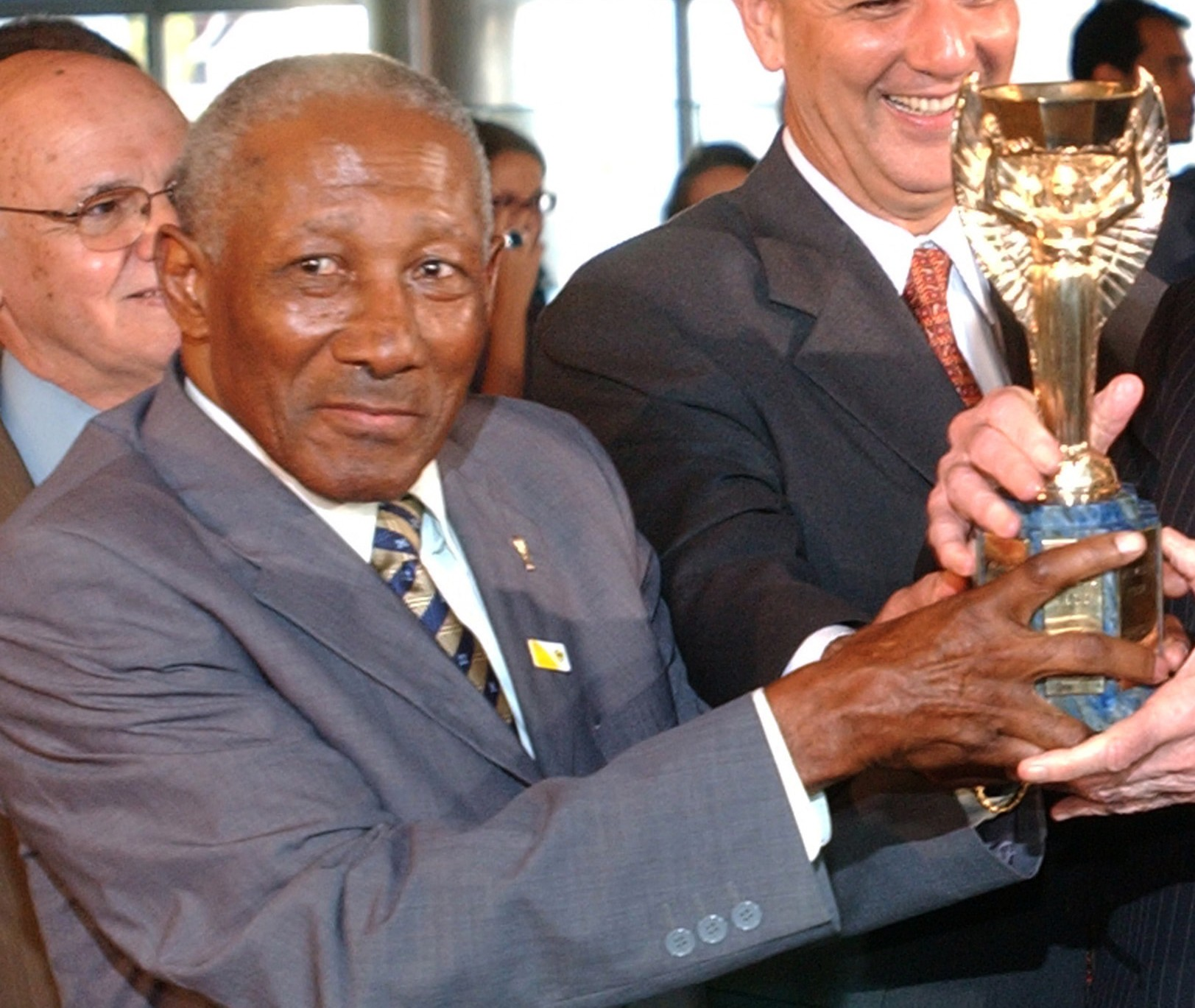
- Santos with the Jules Rimet Trophy in 2008

Personal information
- Full name: Dejalma Santos
- Date of birth: 27 February 1929
- Place of birth: São Paulo, Brazil
- Date of death: 23 July 2013 (aged 84)
- Place of death: Uberaba, Brazil
- Height: 1.73 m (5 ft 8 in)
- Position: Right-back

Senior career*
Years	Team	Apps	(Gls)
1948–1959	Portuguesa (Note: His numbers in the infobox aren't only league matches and they also include friendly matches. Apart from Palmeiras, where league matches can be separated from non-league matches, there are no sources found online for Portuguesa and Atlético Paranaense that separate the matches to official and friendly ones, and to league and non-league matches.)	434 (Note: There are sources that claim a total of 453 matches for Portuguesa, and others a total of 510 matches for Lusa.)	(11)
1959–1968	Palmeiras (Note: The total of Palmeiras includes also the matches played in the Campeonato Paulista, the matches played in the Torneio Roberto Gomes Pedrosa and the matches played in the Torneio Rio–São Paulo.)	314+	(6+)
1968–1971	Atlético Paranaense	32	(2)
Total		780+	(19+)

International career
1952–1968	Brazil (Note: Including unofficial matches for Brazil, the total with the shirt of Seleção goes up to 114 matches, or to 133 matches, based on other sources, but the most recent references from CBF give a total of 114 matches.)	98	(3)

Managerial career
- 1969–1971: Atlético Paranaense
- 1972: Vitória
- 1972: Paulista de Jundiaí
- 1976: Sampaio Corrêa
- 1990: Uberaba
Medal record
Men's Football
Representing Brazil
FIFA World Cup
Winner	1958 Sweden
Winner	1962 Chile
South American Championship
Runner-up	1953 Peru
Runner-up	1957 Peru
Runner-up	1959 Argentina
Panamerican Championship
Winner	1952 Chile
- * Club domestic league appearances and goals

Djalma Pereira Dias dos Santos, known simply as Djalma Santos (Brazilian Portuguese: [diˈʒawmɐ ˈsɐ̃tus]; also spelled Dejalma Santos; 27 February 1929 – 23 July 2013) was a Brazilian footballer and manager, who played for Brazil in 4 World Cups and was part of the squads that won the 1958 and 1962 editions.

Santos is considered to be one of the greatest right-backs of all time. While primarily known for his defensive skills, he often ventured upfield and displayed some impressive technical and attacking skills. Along with Franz Beckenbauer and Philipp Lahm, he is one of only three players to be included into three FIFA World Cup All Star teams (in 1954, 1958 and 1962). In addition, he was named by Pelé as one of the top 125 greatest living footballers in March 2004. Known as an exemplary player, he was never sent-off from the field.

Including friendly matches, he has made over 1,000 professional appearances in his career.

Djalma Santos made history in the three big clubs he played for. Djalma was an idol at Palmeiras, where he played 498 matches, or 502 matches, according to more recent references, (Note: The official website of Palmeiras and other references give a total of 502 matches for the club, as well as the latest reference from CBF, and some references say he played in "more than 500 matches".) in nine years and won several titles, at Portuguesa, where he emerged in professional football and played 510 matches, and at Atlético Paranaense, where he ended his career, after having played 32 matches for Furacão.

== Club career ==
Djalma Santos started his career in his hometown with Portuguesa. He initially played in the centre of defence, but was later moved to the right side of defense. He was part of one of the best Portuguesa team of all time, where alongside players like Pinga, Julinho Botelho and Brandãozinho he won the Rio-São Paulo Tournament in 1952 and 1955 and the Blue Ribbon in 1951 and 1953. He is the second largest record holder of matches played by the club, with a total of 434 matches between the years 1949 and 1958, second only to Capitão, who played 496 matches for Lusa.

Then he played for Palmeiras, in 498 matches, or in 502 matches, according to more recent references,, in nine years and won several titles. Santos is the seventh player who wore most the "alviverde" {Green and White} jersey. He was featured in the first academy alongside stars such as Ademir da Guia, Julinho Botelho, Djalma Dias and Vavá. It was at Palmeiras that he won the greatest number of titles of his career: the Paulista Championship in 1959, 1963 and 1966; the Brazilian Championships of 1960, 1967 (Robertão) and Brazil Cup of 1967. In addition, he won the Rio-São Paulo Tournament in 1965.

In 1968, he joined Atlético Paranaense, where he ended his career, after having played 32 matches for Furacão, and was 41 years old when he retired from playing, on 21 January 1971.

However, on 30 January 1972, he played in a friendly match for Portuguesa against Zaire national team, in the inauguration of Estádio do Canindé.

Known as an exemplary player, he was never sent-off from the field.

Also, despite having only defended three clubs in his career, Djalma Santos once wore the jersey of São Paulo, even though he belonged to Palmeiras at the time: on 9 November 1960, he played as an honor guest in the celebrations of the inauguration of the Morumbi Stadium, in the victory over Nacional Montevideo, with 3–0, with goals from Canhoteiro and Gino.

== International career ==
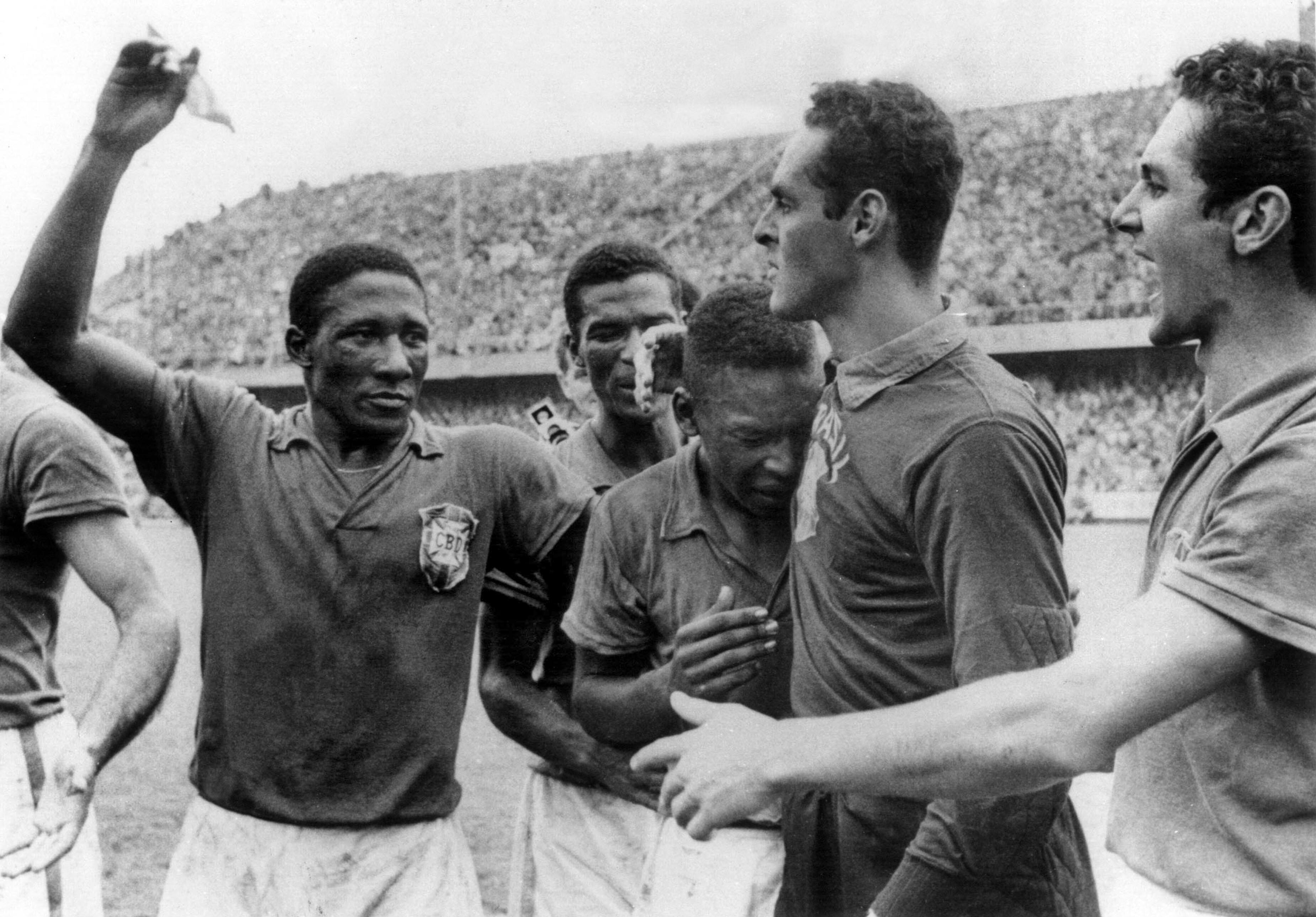
Brazilian footballers Djalma Santos (left), Pelé (weeping) and Gilmar after winning the 1958 World Cup. Behind Pelé there's Didi, while on the right side Orlando Peçanha.

Santos made 98 official appearances for Brazil between 1952 and 1968, and was in the squad for four consecutive World Cups between 1954 and 1966. He made his first appearance against Peru in the Panamerican Championship. The match was drawn 0–0. He also made two unofficial appearances for Brazil.

Along with Argentina's Néstor Rossi, he was the only player to be unanimously voted into the 1957 South American Championship squad.

=== 1954 World Cup ===
Santos made his World Cup debut in a 5–0 win against Mexico, and played in all of Brazil's matches during the tournament. He scored his first goal for Brazil from the penalty spot in a 4–2 defeat against Hungary (also known as the "Battle of Berne").

=== 1958 World Cup ===
Santos had lost his place in the side after being dropped in favour of De Sordi, and did not play until the final against Sweden. Brazil won the match 5–2, with Santos being one of the outstanding performers. As a result, despite only playing one match in the tournament, he was included in the tournament's All-Star Team.

=== 1962 World Cup ===
Santos was once again a regular in the starting lineup, playing in all of Brazil's matches. In the final against Czechoslovakia he set up the final goal for Brazil. Noting that the Slovak goalkeeper Viliam Schrojf was somewhat off his line, Santos lofted a long, massive, high arcing ball, into the goalmouth aided by the glare of the afternoon sun. Schrojf mishandled the cross, and Brazilian striker Vavá hammered the ball into goal.

=== 1966 World Cup ===
Santos, now at the age of 37, was selected for a fourth consecutive World Cup. The inclusion of Santos in the squad was a surprise to some, with Carlos Alberto expected to be selected instead. Santos played the first two matches, but was dropped after the 3–1 defeat to Hungary. Brazil were knocked out of the tournament in the next match against Portugal.

== Style of play ==
Santos began his career in midfield, later playing as a defender and right-back, earning the nickname Muralha (the wall) from Uruguayan writer Eduardo Galeano. He was also capable of playing as a centre back, and was a penalty kick and set-piece taker, with the ability to take long throw-ins.

== Death ==
Santos died on 23 July 2013 in hospital in Uberaba, where he had lived for two decades. He died due to pneumonia and severe hemodynamic instability, culminating with cardiac arrest, having been hospitalized since 1 July 2013.

== Honours ==
Portuguesa

- Torneio Rio – São Paulo: 1952, 1955
- Fita Azul Internacional: 1951, 1953, 1954

Palmeiras

- Campeonato Paulista: 1959, 1963, 1966
- Campeonato Brasileiro Série A: 1960, 1967 (TB), 1967 (TRGP)
- Torneio Rio – São Paulo: 1965
- Copa Libertadores runner-up: 1961, 1968

Brazil

- FIFA World Cup: 1958, 1962
- Panamerican Championship: 1952
- Roca Cup: 1957, 1960, 1963
- Copa Río Branco: 1968
- Taça Oswaldo Cruz: 1955, 1956, 1962
- Taça Bernado O'Higgins: 1959

Individual

- Campeonato Paulista Team of the Tournament: 1951, 1952, 1953
- Torneio Rio-São Paulo Team of the Tournament: 1952, 1955
- Campeonato Paulista Player of the Tournament: 1953
- FIFA World Cup All-Star Team: 1954, 1958, 1962
- Copa América Team of the Tournament: 1957
- World Soccer World XI: 1962, 1963, 1965
- World XI: 1963
- FIFA World Cup All-Time Team: 1994
- FIFA 100
- The Best of The Best – Player of the Century: Top 50
- Brazilian Football Museum Hall of Fame
