= Ademar Pantera =

Brazilian footballer (1941–2001)

Personal information
- Full name: Ademar Miranda Júnior
- Date of birth: 31 October 1941
- Place of birth: São Paulo, Brazil
- Date of death: 30 November 2001 (aged 60)
- Place of death: São Paulo, Brazil
- Position: Forward

Youth career
- –1963: Prudentina

Senior career*
Years	Team	Apps	(Gls)
1963–1964	Prudentina		
1964–1968	Palmeiras	135	(87)
1967	→ Flamengo (loan)	44	(32)
1968	Fluminense		
1969	Coritiba		
1970	Uberaba		

International career
1962	Brazil Access		
1962–1966	Brazil	3	(0)
- * Club domestic league appearances and goals as of 2 September 2023

Ademar Miranda Júnior (31 October 1941 – 30 November 2001), better known as Ademar Pantera, was a Brazilian former professional footballer who played as a forward.

== Career ==
Ademar was the great highlight of Prudentina , which rose from the third to the first division in two years, and soon caught the attention of the Brazil national team and Palmeiras, where he played most of his career. At Flamengo, he was top scorer in the 1967 Roberto Gomes Pedrosa Tournament.

== Death ==
He died at Hospital Sirio Libanês due to a degenerative disease.

== Honours ==
Prudentina

- Campeonato Paulista Série A3: 1960
- Campeonato Paulista Série A2: 1961

Palmeiras

- Torneio Rio-São Paulo: 1965
- Campeonato Paulista: 1966

Coritiba

- Campeonato Paranaense: 1969

Brazil

- South American Access Championship: 1962

Individual

- 1967 Torneio Roberto Gomes Pedrosa top scorer: 20 goals
