= 1955 Torneio Rio-São Paulo =

Torneio Rio-São Paulo
- Season: 1955
- Champions: Portuguesa (2nd title)
- Matches played: 47
- Goals scored: 186 (3.96 per match)
- Top goalscorer: Edmur (Portuguesa) – 11 goals
- Biggest home win: Palmeiras 10–3 America (7 May)

The 1955 Torneio Rio São Paulo was the 9th edition of the Torneio Rio-São Paulo. It was disputed between 6 April to 5 June.

== Participants ==
Team	City	Nº participations	Best result
America	Rio de Janeiro	6	6th (1951)
Botafogo	Rio de Janeiro	6	4th (1953)
Corinthians	(São Paulo (state)) São Paulo	9	Champions: 1950, 1953, 1954
Flamengo	Rio de Janeiro	8	4th (1951)
Fluminense	Rio de Janeiro	8	Runners-up: 1954
Palmeiras	(São Paulo (state)) São Paulo	9	Champions: 1933, 1951
Portuguesa	(São Paulo (state)) São Paulo	9	Champions: 1952
Santos	(São Paulo (state)) Santos	6	5th (1952)
São Paulo	(São Paulo (state)) São Paulo	9	Runners-up: 1933
Vasco da Gama	Rio de Janeiro	9	Runners-up: 1950, 1952, 1953

== Format ==
The tournament were disputed in a single round-robin format, with the club with most points conquered being the champions.

== Tournament ==
Following is the summary of the 1955 Torneio Rio-São Paulo tournament:

Pos	Team	Pld	W	D	L	GF	GA	GD	Pts	Qualification
1	(São Paulo (state)) Palmeiras	9	6	1	2	32	19	+13	13 (Note: Tied in points)	Tiebreaker playoff
2	(São Paulo (state)) Portuguesa	9	5	3	1	26	15	+11	13	Tiebreaker playoff
3	Botafogo	9	4	3	2	12	12	0	11	
4	Flamengo	9	4	2	3	16	14	+2	10	
5	(São Paulo (state)) Santos	9	4	1	4	17	21	−4	9 (Note: Tied in points)	
6	America	9	3	3	3	18	24	−6	9	
7	Fluminense	9	3	1	5	15	21	−6	7 (Note: Tied in points)	
8	Vasco da Gama	9	2	3	4	15	15	0	7	
9	(São Paulo (state)) São Paulo	9	2	2	5	11	16	−5	6	
10	(São Paulo (state)) Corinthians	9	1	3	5	18	23	−5	5	

Source: RSSSF
Rules for classification: 1) points; 2) wins; 3) goal difference; 4) goals for.

=== Tiebreaker playoff ===
Following is the info about the tiebreaker playoff:

29 May 1955

Portuguesa (São Paulo (state))	2–2	(São Paulo (state)) Palmeiras
Edmur 41'; Aírton 65'	Report	Renatinho 1'; Ivan Palmeira 60'

Pacaembu, São Paulo
Referee: Mário Vianna

5 June 1955

Palmeiras (São Paulo (state))	0–2	(São Paulo (state)) Portuguesa
	Report	Julinho 36'; Ipojucan 63'

Pacaembu, São Paulo
Referee: Mário Vianna
