= Oberdan Cattani =

Brazilian footballer

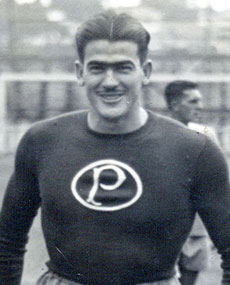

Personal information
- Full name: Oberdan Cattani
- Date of birth: June 12, 1919
- Place of birth: Sorocaba, Brazil
- Date of death: June 20, 2014
- Place of death: São Paulo, Brazil
- Height: 1.85 m (6 ft 1 in)
- Position: Goalkeeper

Senior career*
Years	Team	Apps	(Gls)
1940–1954	Palmeiras	351	(0)
1954–1955	Juventus	26	(0)
Total		377	(0)

International career
1944–1945	Brazil	9	(0)
- * Club domestic league appearances and goals

Oberdan Cattani (June 12, 1919 - June 20, 2014) was a Brazilian football player in the position of goalkeeper. He played for Palmeiras from 1940 to 1954. He was born in Sorocaba, São Paulo.

== Biography ==
Oberdan Cattani was the son of Italian immigrants from the Tuscany region. He was a truck driver when he took his first test, on a day off from work. Introduced before by his brother, he was hired in 1941, remaining at the club until 1954, having played 351 matches with Palmeiras.

Of tall stature, big hands and elasticity, his defenses made him one of the most famous Brazilian goalkeepers of the 40s, a period in which the Second World War prevented the holding of the World Cups.

His name is among the biggest idols of Palmeiras. In his curriculum for the club, there are four titles of Campeonato Paulista (1942, 1944, 1947 and 1950), the Tournament Rio-São Paulo of 1951 and the Copa Rio Internacional of 1951. The tournament, which was created with the aim of being a Club World Cup. In the conquest, Oberdan was in the reserve of the goalkeeper Fábio Crippa

On April 24, 1955, Oberdan was honored in São Carlos by the "Association of Sports Chroniclers of São Carlos", with a cup.

== Style of play ==
Oberdan was described by opponents as an agile goalkeeper with great physical strength. A hallmark of Oberdan was that he could hold the ball with just one hand.

== Death ==
Oberdan died on June 20, 2014, at the age of 95. The cause of death was cardiac complications caused by pneumonia.

== Titles ==
Palmeiras

- Copa Rio Internacional: 1951
- Torneio Rio-São Paulo: 1951
- Taça dos Campeões Estaduais Rio–São Paulo: 1942, 1947
- Campeonato Paulista: 1942, 1944], 1947, 1950
- Taça Cidade de São Paulo: 1945, 1946, 1950, 1951
- Torneio Início Paulista: 1942, 1946

Seleção Paulista

- Campeonato Brasileiro de Seleções Estaduais: 1941, 1942

Brazil

- South American Championship runner-up: 1945
