= Noronha (footballer, born 1924) =

Brazilian footballer (1924–2006)

Personal information
- Full name: Walter Manna
- Date of birth: 8 August 1924
- Place of birth: Belo Horizonte, Brazil
- Date of death: 26 November 2006 (aged 82)
- Place of death: São Paulo, Brazil
- Position: Forward

Senior career*
Years	Team	Apps	(Gls)
1942–1943	Canto do Rio		
1944	Fluminense		
1944–1945	América-MG		
1946–1947	Canto do Rio		
1948–1951	Corinthians	82	(36)
1951	Juventus-SP		
1952	Nacional-SP		
- * Club domestic league appearances and goals as of 24 March 2024

Walter Manna (8 August 1924 – 26 November 2006), better known as Noronha, was a Brazilian professional footballer who played as a forward.

== Career ==
A striker, Noronha was one of the highlights of the Corinthians team that won the Rio-São Paulo Tournament in 1950. He also had spells at Fluminense and Canto do Rio.

== Honours ==
Corinthians

- Torneio Rio-São Paulo: 1950
