= Dirceu Carvalho =

Brazilian footballer (1941–2019)

Dirceu
Personal information
- Full name: Dirceu de Carvalho
- Date of birth: 21 May 1941
- Place of birth: São José do Rio Preto, Brazil
- Date of death: 4 January 2019 (aged 77)
- Place of death: São José do Rio Preto, Brazil
- Position: Left winger

Youth career
- América-SP

Senior career*
Years	Team	Apps	(Gls)
1960–1963	América-SP		
1963–1966	Palmeiras		
1966	Flamengo		
1967	Portuguesa		
1967–1969	Botafogo-SP		
1969–1970	Londrina		
1971	Apucarana		
1972	Rio Preto		
- * Club domestic league appearances and goals as of 4 February 2024

Dirceu Carvalho (21 May 1941 – 4 January 2019), was a Brazilian professional footballer who played as a left winger.

== Career ==
A fast left winger, Dirceu Carvalho was one of the highlights of the champion team of the second division of América de Rio Preto in 1963. He was signed by Palmeiras where he was part of the São Paulo champion squad in 1966. He also played for Flamengo, Botafogo-SP, Londrina, Apucarana and Rio Preto EC.

== Honours ==
América-SP

- Campeonato Paulista Série A2: 1963

Palmeiras

- Campeonato Paulista: 1966

== Death ==
Dirceu died on 4 January 2019, at the age of 77, after a cardiorespiratory arrest. He suffered from heart disease and was hospitalised.
