= Estádio Prudentão =

Estádio Paulo Constantino
- Prudentão
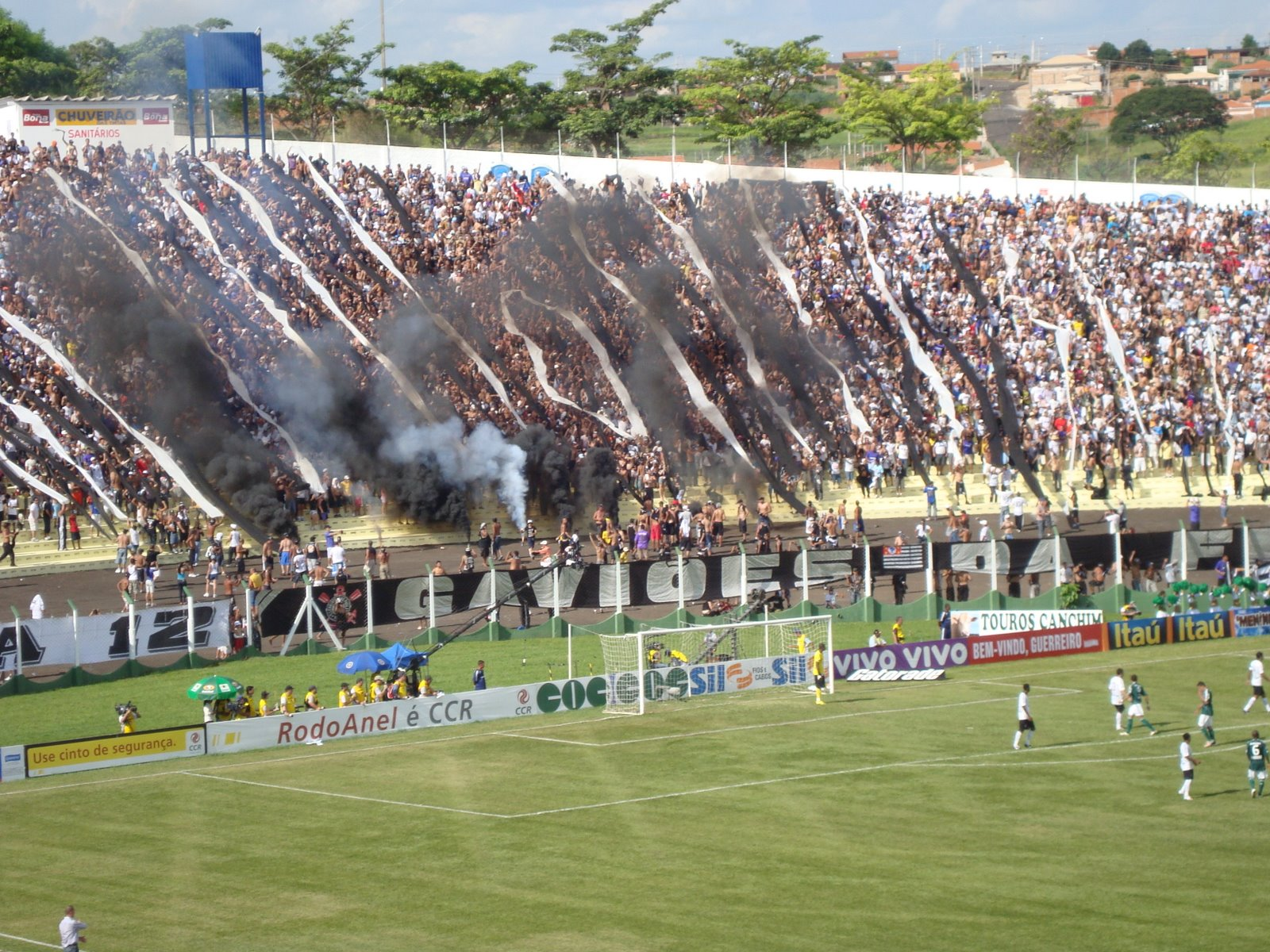
- Sisbrace
- Interactive map of Estádio Paulo Constantino
- Full name: Estádio Paulo Constantino
- Location: Presidente Prudente, São Paulo
- Coordinates: 22°5′55″S 51°24′54″W
- Owner: Presidente Prudente Municipality
- Capacity: 45,954
- Surface: Natural grass
- Field size: 105 by 68 metres (114.8 yd × 74.4 yd)

Construction
- Built: 1982
- Opened: 1982
- Renovated: 2007–2008

Tenants
- Esporte Clube Corinthians; Grêmio Prudente Futebol (2010–2011); Oeste Paulista Esporte Clube; Prudentino Futebol Clube

Estádio Paulo Constantino, most commonly known as Prudentão, and formerly as Estádio Eduardo José Farah, or simply Farahzão, is a multi-use stadium in Presidente Prudente, in the state of São Paulo, Brazil. It is currently used mostly for football matches. The stadium holds 45,954. It was built in 1982. The stadium is owned by the Presidente Prudente City Hall, and its formal name honored Eduardo José Farah, who was the Paulista Football Federation president during the stadium reformation. Oeste Paulista Esporte Clube usually plays their home matches at the stadium.

== History ==
The inaugural match was played on October 12, 1982, when Santos beat Corinthians (Presidente Prudente) 1–0. The first goal of the stadium was scored by Santos' Paulinho. The stadium maximum capacity at the time was 20,000 people.

The stadium's attendance record currently stands at 45,972 people, set on March 3, 1996, when Palmeiras beat Corinthians 3–1.

In 2001, the stadium maximum capacity was expanded to 50,000 people. However, the capacity was later reduced to its current 45,954 people.
