= Paulinho Nunes =

Brazilian footballer

Paulinho
Personal information
- Full name: Paulo Rubens Nunes Felippe
- Date of birth: 12 February 1936
- Place of birth: Jaguariúna, Brazil
- Date of death: 28 July 1994 (aged 58)
- Position: Forward

Senior career*
Years	Team	Apps	(Gls)
1952–1960	Ponte Preta		(140)
1961	Corinthians	29	(13)
1962–1965	Comercial-SP		
1966–1968	Francana		

International career
1962	Brazil Access		
- * Club domestic league appearances and goals as of 23 February 2024

Paulo Rubens Nunes Felippe (12 February 1936 – 28 July 1994), also known as Paulinho or Paulinho Nunes, was a Brazilian professional footballer who played as a forward.

== Career ==
Ponte Preta's second-highest scorer behind only Dicá, Paulinho scored 140 goals for the club, playing from 1952 to 1960. In 1961 he played for Corinthians, scoring 13 goals in 29 games, and later played for Comercial-SP and Francana. In 1962 he defended the Brazilian access team, becoming champion.

== Honours ==
Brazil

- South American Access Championship: 1962
