= Mário Travaglini =

Brazilian footballer and manager

Personal information
- Full name: Mário Travaglini
- Date of birth: 30 April 1932
- Place of birth: São Paulo, Brazil
- Date of death: 20 February 2014 (aged 81)
- Place of death: São Paulo, Brazil
- Position: Centre back

Youth career
- 1947–1952: Ypiranga-SP

Senior career*
| Years | Team | Apps | (Gls) |
| 1953–1955 | Ypiranga-SP | | |
| 1955 | Palmeiras | | |
| 1956 | Nacional-SP | | |
| 1957 | Portuguesa | | |
| 1957–1962 | Ponte Preta | | |

Managerial career
- 1963–1971: Palmeiras (youth)
- 1964: Palmeiras
- 1965–1966: Palmeiras
- 1967–1968: Palmeiras
- 1971: Palmeiras
- 1972–1975: Vasco da Gama
- 1976–1977: Fluminense
- 1979: Brazil U23
- 1980: Operário-MS
- 1980: Ferroviária
- 1980–1981: Portuguesa
- 1981–1983: Corinthians
- 1983–1984: São Paulo
- 1984–1985: Palmeiras
- 1985: Corinthians
- 1987: Vitória
- 1988: XV de Piracicaba
- 1989: Botafogo-SP
- 1991: São Bento
Medal record
Men's football
Representing Brazil
Pan American Games
| Gold medal – first place | 1979 San Juan | Team |
- * Club domestic league appearances and goals

Mário Travaglini (30 April 1932 – 20 February 2014) was a Brazilian football manager and former player who played as a central defender.

== Playing career ==
Born in Bom Retiro, São Paulo, Travaglini joined Clube Atlético Ypiranga's youth setup at the age of 16. He made his first team debut for the club on 12 September 1953, in a 1–1 Campeonato Paulista match against Corinthians at the Pacaembu Stadium.

Travaglini moved to Palmeiras in 1955, but left in the following year for Nacional-SP. He also represented Portuguesa and Ponte Preta, retiring with the latter in 1962 at the age of just 30.

== Managerial career ==
Shortly after retiring, Travaglini worked for a brief period at the Estrada de Ferro Santos-Jundiaí before returning to football in 1963, as a manager of Palmeiras' youth categories. He remained at the club until 1971, being also in charge of first team on several occasions.

Travaglini left the São Paulo state in 1972, after being named at the helm of Vasco da Gama. He won the 1974 Série A with the club before leaving in 1975, and taking over Fluminense in 1976.

Travaglini left Flu in 1977, and was named technical supervisor of Cláudio Coutinho at the Brazil national team in the following year. In 1979, he led the under-23s to a Pan American Games gold medal.

Travaglini returned to club duties in 1980, being in charge of Operário-MS, Ferroviária and Portuguesa. He was named manager of Corinthians in 1982, being the manager of the club during the Democracia Corinthiana period, winning the 1982 Campeonato Paulista.

Travaglini was also in charge of Timão when the club defeated Tiradentes-PI by 10–1, the biggest win of Série A history. He left the club shortly after, taking over São Paulo.

In 1984, Travaglini returned to Verdão but left in the following year to return to Corinthians. He subsequently had brief periods in charge of Vitória, XV de Piracicaba, Botafogo-SP and São Bento, retiring from football in 1991.

== Death ==
Travaglini died on 20 February 2014, due to respiratory complications coming from a brain tumor.

== Honours ==
=== Manager ===
Palmeiras

- Campeonato Paulista: 1966
- Taça Brasil: 1967

Vasco da Gama

- Campeonato Brasileiro Série A: 1974

Fluminense

- Campeonato Carioca: 1976

Brazil U23

- Pan American Games: 1979

Corinthians

- Campeonato Paulista: 1982
