= 1951 Copa Rio =

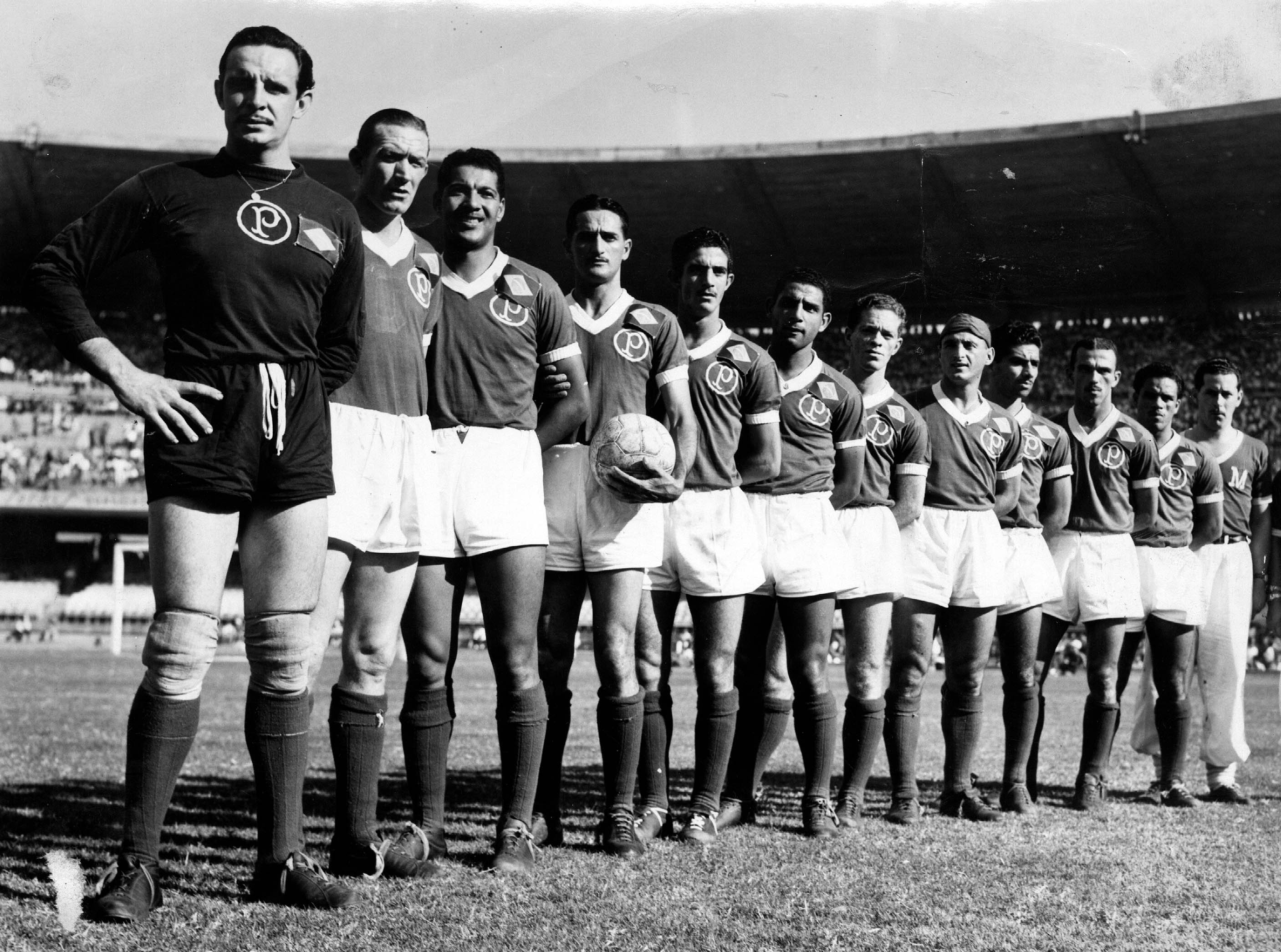
- 1951 Copa Rio winning Palmeiras squad

Tournament details
- Host country: Brazil
- Dates: 30 June – 22 July
- Teams: 8 (from 7 associations)
- Venues: 2 (in 2 host cities)

Final positions
- Champions: (Brazil) Palmeiras (1st title)
- Runners-up: (Italy) Juventus

Tournament statistics
- Matches played: 18

The 1951 Copa Rio, also known as Torneio Internacional de Clubes Campeões (International Champions Club Tournament, in English), was the first edition of the Copa Rio, the first intercontinental club football tournament with teams from Europe and South America, held in Rio de Janeiro and São Paulo from 30 June to 22 July. Participant clubs were divided into two zones of four teams, playing each other once in a single round-robin tournament.

The tournament featured players such as Vavá, Ademir of Vasco da Gama, Jair da Rosa Pinto of Palmeiras, José Santamaría, Walter Taibo, goalkeeper Anibal Paz, Luis Volpi of Nacional, Branko Stankovic, Rajko Mitic of Red Star Belgrade, Giampiero Boniperti, Danish Karl Aage Præst and John Hansen of Juventus, José Travassos of Sporting Lisbon, and Swedish Lennart Samuelsson and Antoine Bonifaci of Nice. Juventus's coach was the legendary Hungarian György Sárosi.

The final was played in a two-legged format, contested by Brazilian team Palmeiras and Italian side Juventus. Palmeiras won the series 2–1 on points, achieving their first Copa Rio trophy.

== Participants ==
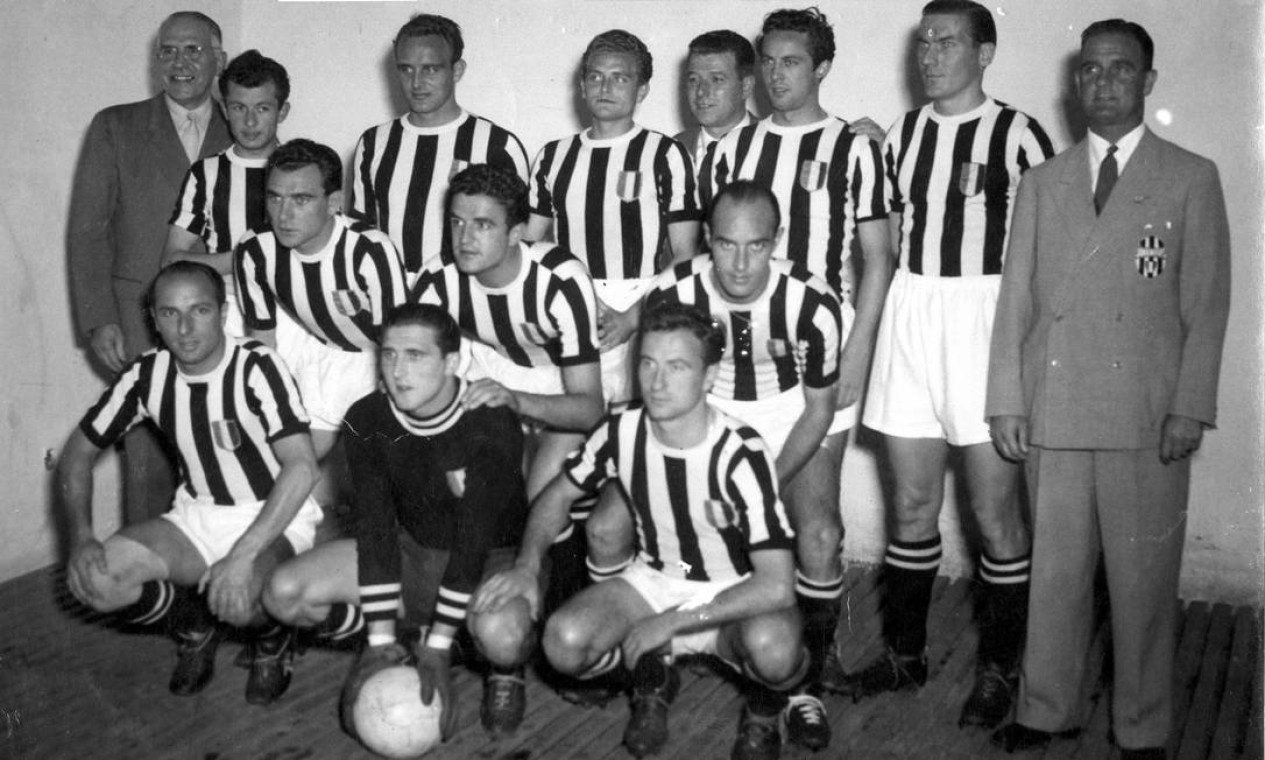
1951 Copa Rio runners-up Juventus squad

Team	Qualification
Austria Wien	1949–50 Austrian Bundesliga champion (Note: Austrian champions of 1950–51 (Rapid Vienna) declined to participate.)
(Brazil) Vasco da Gama	1950 Campeonato Carioca champion
(Brazil) Palmeiras	1950 Campeonato Paulista champion
(France) Nice	1950–51 French Division 1 champion
(Italy) Juventus	1949–50 Serie A champions (Note: Italian champion of the season, AC Milan, renounced because they had to play the Latin Cup during the same period.)
(Portugal) Sporting	1950–51 Primeira Divisão champion
(Uruguay) Nacional	1950 Primera División champions
(Socialist Federal Republic of Yugoslavia) Red Star	1951 Yugoslav First League champion

== Venues ==
Rio de Janeiro	São Paulo
Maracanã Stadium	Pacaembu Stadium
Capacity: 150,000	Capacity: 71,000

== Tournament course ==
=== Rio de Janeiro Group ===
All matches played at Maracanã Stadium

Teams	GP	W	D	L	GF	GA	GD	Points
(Brazil) Vasco da Gama	3	3	0	0	12	2	10	6
Austria Wien	3	2	0	1	7	6	1	4
(Uruguay) Nacional	3	1	0	2	3	8	-5	2
(Portugal) Sporting CP	3	0	0	3	4	10	-6	0

30 June 1951

Austria Wien	4–0	(Uruguay) Nacional
Aurednik 22', 27'; Stosjaspal 53', 85'	Report

Maracanã, Rio de Janeiro
Attendance: 27,463
Referee: Patrick Power (England)

1 July 1951

Vasco da Gama (Brazil)	5–1	(Portugal) Sporting
Friaça (?); Tesourinha (?); Ipojucan 46', 75'; Djair 89'	Report	Patalino 87'

Maracanã, Rio de Janeiro
Attendance: 91,438
Referee: Gabriel Tordjmann (France)

3 July 1951

Nacional (Uruguay)	3–2	(Portugal) Sporting
Bermúdez 12'; Ramírez 75'; Ambrois 88'	Report	Patalino 10'; Jesus Correia 15'

Maracanã, Rio de Janeiro
Attendance: 21,642
Referee: Giovanni Galeati (Italy)

5 July 1951

Vasco da Gama (Brazil)	5–1	Austria Wien
Friaça 15' (?), 63' (?); Tesourinha (?)	Report	E. Melchior 10'

Maracanã, Rio de Janeiro
Attendance: 93,833
Referee: Patrick Power (England)

7 July 1951

Austria Wien	2–1	(Portugal) Sporting
Aurednik; Huber	Report	Albano

Maracanã, Rio de Janeiro
Referee: Mihailo Popović (Yugoslavia)

8 July 1951

Vasco da Gama (Brazil)	2–0	(Uruguay) Nacional
Djair 36'; Ipojucan 68'	Report

Maracanã, Rio de Janeiro
Attendance: 61,766
Referee: Patrick Power (England)

=== São Paulo Group ===
All matches played at Pacaembu Stadium.

Teams	GP	W	D	L	GF	GA	GD	Points
(Italy) Juventus	3	3	0	0	10	4	6	6
(Brazil) Palmeiras	3	2	0	1	5	5	0	4
(France) Nice	3	1	0	2	4	7	-3	2
(Socialist Federal Republic of Yugoslavia) Red Star	3	0	0	3	4	7	-3	0

30 June 1951

Palmeiras (Brazil)	3–0	(France) Nice
Aquiles 52'; Ponce de León 56'; Richard 76'	Report

Pacaembu, São Paulo
Attendance: 28,709
Referee: Franz Grill (Austria)

1 July 1951

Juventus (Italy)	3–2	(Socialist Federal Republic of Yugoslavia) Red Star
Boniperti 26', 42'; K. Hansen 84' (pen.)	Report	Tomašević 18'; Ognjanov 48'

Pacaembu, São Paulo
Referee: Alberto da Gama Malcher (Brazil)

3 July 1951

Juventus (Italy)	3–2	(France) Nice
Vivolo 11'; Præst 35'; Muccinelli 77'	Report	Courteaux 20', 60'

Pacaembu, São Paulo
Referee: Franz Grill (Austria)

5 July 1951

Palmeiras (Brazil)	2–1	(Socialist Federal Republic of Yugoslavia) Red Star
Aquiles 11'; Liminha 80'	Report	Ognjanov 8'

Pacaembu, São Paulo
Attendance: 24,933
Referee: Gabriel Tordjmann (France)

7 July 1951

Nice (France)	2–1	(Socialist Federal Republic of Yugoslavia) Red Star
Ben Tifour 49'; Bengtsson (?)	Report	Mitić 46'

Pacaembu, São Paulo
Referee: Mário Vianna (Brazil)

8 July 1951

Juventus (Italy)	4–0	(Brazil) Palmeiras
Boniperti 10', 18'; K. Hansen 48' (pen.); Præst 80'	Report

Pacaembu, São Paulo
Attendance: 37,639
Referee: Edward Graigh (England)

=== Semi-finals ===
==== First leg ====
12 July 1951

Austria Wien	3–3	(Italy) Juventus
Koller 29'; Stojaspal 39', 85' (pen.)	Report	Muccinelli 32'; Præst 49', 72'

Pacaembu, São Paulo
Referee: Alberto da Gama Malcher (Brazil)

12 July 1951

Palmeiras (Brazil)	2–1	(Brazil) Vasco da Gama
Richard 24'; Liminha 37'	Report	Maneca 46'

Maracanã, Rio de Janeiro
Attendance: 42,992
Referee: Edward Graigh (England)

==== Second leg ====
14 July 1951

Juventus (Italy)	3–1	Austria Wien
Muccinelli 53', 55'; Boniperti 59'	Report	Stojaspal

Pacaembu, São Paulo
Referee: Edward Graigh (England)

15 July 1951

Vasco da Gama (Brazil)	0–0	(Brazil) Palmeiras
	Report

Maracanã, Rio de Janeiro
Attendance: 77,488
Referee: Edward Graigh (England)

=== Finals ===
Champion	Runner-up	1 leg	Venue	2 leg	Venue	Aggr.
(Brazil) Palmeiras	(Italy) Juventus	1–0	Maracanã	2–2	Maracanã	3–2

==== Match details ====
1951 Copa Rio Finals
18 July 1951
1st Leg

Palmeiras (Brazil)	1–0	(Italy) Juventus
Rodrigues 20'	Report

Maracanã, Rio de Janeiro
Attendance: 56,961
Referee: Franz Grill (Austria)

22 July 1951
2nd Leg

Juventus (Italy)	2–2	(Brazil) Palmeiras
Præst 18'; K. Hansen 63'	Report	Rodrigues 47'; Liminha 77'

Maracanã, Rio de Janeiro
Attendance: 100,093
Referee: Gabriel Tordjmann (France)

Juventus
Palmeiras

GK	(Italy) Giovanni Viola
DF	(Italy) Alberto Bertuccelli
DF	(Italy) Sergio Manente
DF	(Italy) Carlo Parola
MF	(Italy) Alberto Piccinini
MF	(Italy) Giacomo Mari
OR	(Italy) Ermes Muccinelli
IR	(Denmark) Karl Hansen
CF	(Italy) Giampiero Boniperti
IL	(Denmark) John Hansen
OL	(Denmark) Carl Præst
Manager:
(England) Jesse Carver

GK	(Brazil) Fábio
RB	(Brazil) Salvador
CB	(Brazil) Juvenal
LB	(Brazil) Dema
MF	(Brazil) Túlio
MF	(Argentina) Luís Villa
OR	(Brazil) Eduardo Lima
IR	(Brazil) Ponce de León	Substituted off
CF	(Brazil) Liminha
IL	(Brazil) Jair
OL	(Brazil) Rodrigues
Substitutes:
FW	(Brazil) Canhotinho	Substituted on
Manager:
(Uruguay) Ventura Cambón

Palmeiras won the series 2–1 on points

1951 Copa Rio
(Brazil)
Palmeiras
First Intercontinental title
