= Flávio Murtosa =

Brazilian footballer and manager (born 1951)

Personal information
- Full name: Flávio Teixeira
- Date of birth: 14 January 1951 (age 75)
- Place of birth: Pelotas, Brazil
- Height: 1.65 m (5 ft 5 in)
- Position: Midfielder

Senior career*
Years	Team	Apps	(Gls)
1967–1975	Pelotas		
1975	Maranhão		
1976–1977	Pelotas		

Managerial career
- 1981–1982: Farroupilha
- 1982–1983: Brasil (PE) (assistant coach)
- 1983: Al-Shabab (assistant coach)
- 1984–1985: Brasil (PE) (assistant coach)
- 1986: Juventude (assistant coach)
- 1986–1987: Grêmio (assistant coach)
- 1987: Goiás (assistant coach)
- 1988–1990: Al-Qadsia (assistant coach)
- 1990: Kuwait (assistant coach)
- 1990: Coritiba (assistant coach)
- 1991: Criciúma (assistant coach)
- 1991: Al-Ahli
- 1992: Al-Qadsia (assistant coach)
- 1993–1996: Grêmio (assistant coach)
- 1997: Júbilo Iwata (assistant coach)
- 1997: Juventude
- 1998–2000: Palmeiras (assistant coach)
- 2000–2001: Cruzeiro (assistant coach)
- 2001–2002: Brazil (assistant coach)
- 2002: Palmeiras
- 2003–2008: Portugal (assistant coach)
- 2008–2009: Chelsea (assistant coach)
- 2009–2010: Bunyodkor (assistant coach)
- 2010–2012: Palmeiras (assistant coach)
- 2013–2014: Brazil (assistant coach)
- 2014–2015: Grêmio (assistant coach)
- 2015–2017: Guangzhou Evergrande (assistant coach)
- * Club domestic league appearances and goals

Flávio Teixeira (born 14 January 1951), known as Flávio Murtosa or simply Murtosa, is a Brazilian former professional footballer and currently professional football manager. Murtosa has a long friendship with FIFA World Cup winning manager Luiz Felipe Scolari and works mostly as his assistant coach.

== Career ==
Murtosa began playing professional football as a right winger with his hometown's Esporte Clube Pelotas in 1967. He played in the Campeonato Gaúcho with Pelotas, before signing with Maranhão Atlético Clube in 1975. After one season, he returned to Pelotas where he would play until a knee injury forced him to retire at age 26.

== Honours ==
=== Club ===
Al Qadisiya

- Kuwait Emir Cup: 1989

Criciúma

- Copa do Brasil: 1991

Grêmio

- Campeonato Brasileiro Série A: 1996
- Copa do Brasil: 1994
- Campeonato Gaúcho: 1987, 1995, 1996
- Copa Libertadores de América: 1995
- Recopa Sudamericana: 1996

Palmeiras

- Copa do Brasil: 1998, 2012
- Copa Mercosur: 1998
- Copa Libertadores: 1999
- Torneio Rio-São Paulo: 2000
- Copa dos Campeões: 2000

Cruzeiro

- Copa Sul-Minas: 2001

Bunyodkor

- Uzbek League: 2009

=== International ===
Kuwait

- Arabian Gulf Cup: 1990

Brazil

- FIFA World Cup: 2002
- FIFA Confederations Cup: 2013
