= Liminha (footballer, born 1930) =

Brazilian footballer

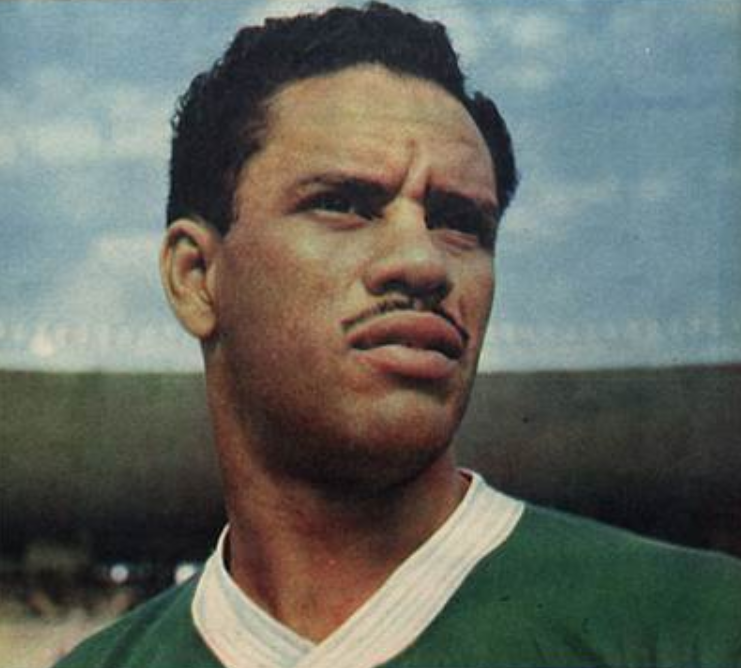

Personal information
- Full name: Oswaldo Luiz Moreira
- Date of birth: 30 January 1930
- Place of birth: São Paulo, Brazil
- Date of death: 22 July 1985 (aged 55)
- Place of death: São Paulo, Brazil
- Position: Forward

Youth career
- –1948: Ypiranga-SP

Senior career*
Years	Team	Apps	(Gls)
1948–1950	Ypiranga-SP		
1951–1955	Palmeiras	230	(106)
1956–1958	Portuguesa	64	(14)
- * Club domestic league appearances and goals as of 6 October 2024

Oswaldo Luiz Moreira (30 January 1930 – 22 July 1985), simply known as Liminha, was a Brazilian professional footballer who played as a forward.

== Career ==
Revealed by CA Ypiranga in 1948, he played for the club until standing out in the state championship in 1950. He was hired by Palmeiras in 1951 and became one of the team's main players, being decisive in winning the Copa Rio Internacional, as well as top scorer in the Rio-São Paulo Tournament with 9 goals. He made 230 appearances and scored 106 goals for Palmeiras. In 1956 he arrived at Portuguesa de Desportos, playing in 64 matches and scoring 14 goals.

== Honours ==
Palmeiras

- Copa Rio: 1951
- Taça Cidade de São Paulo: 1951
- Torneio Rio-São Paulo: 1951

Individual

- 1951 Torneio Rio-São Paulo top scorer: 9 goals (shared)

== Death ==
Liminha died of bronchopneumonia at the age of 55, on 22 July 1985.
