= Elmo Bovio =

Argentine footballer (1925–2017)

Personal information
- Date of birth: July 14, 1925
- Place of birth: Junín, Provincia de Buenos Aires, Argentina
- Date of death: August 26, 2017 (aged 92)
- Position: Striker

Youth career
- Sarmiento

Senior career*
Years	Team	Apps	(Gls)
1942–1943	Sarmiento		
1944–1946	Peñarol		
1946–1947	Inter Milan	10	(5)
1947–1949	Palmeiras	73	(56)
1950	São Paulo	26	(22)
1951	América de Cali	9	(2)
1952–1953	São Paulo		
- * Club domestic league appearances and goals

Elmo Bovio (July 14, 1925 – August 26, 2017) was an Argentine professional footballer who played as a striker.

== Career ==
Born in Junín, Buenos Aires, Bovio began playing football with local side Club Atlético Sarmiento. Next, he moved to Uruguay, where he helped Peñarol win the domestic title. Spells abroad with Inter Milan, Sociedade Esportiva Palmeiras, São Paulo FC and América de Cali would follow. He died in August 2017 at the age of 92.
