= Bianco (footballer) =

Brazilian footballer (1893-1966)

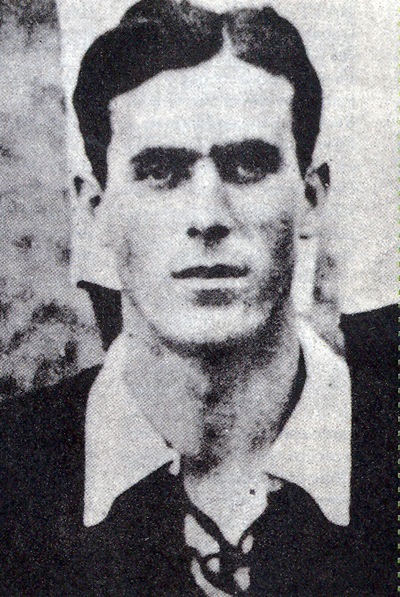

Personal information
- Full name: Bianco Spartaco Gambini
- Date of birth: 18 July 1893
- Place of birth: São Paulo, Brazil
- Date of death: 18 August 1966 (aged 73)
- Position: Defender

International career
Years	Team	Apps	(Gls)
1919	Brazil	5	(0)

Bianco Spartaco Gambini (18 July 1893 – 18 August 1966), known as just Bianco, was a Brazilian footballer who played as a defender. He played in five matches for the Brazil national football team in 1919. He was also part of Brazil's squad for the 1919 South American Championship.
