= Zé Carlos (footballer, born 1936) =

Brazilian footballer (1936–2017)

Personal information
- Full name: José Carlos Coelho
- Date of birth: 9 January 1936
- Place of birth: Batatais, Brazil
- Date of death: 21 October 2017 (aged 81)
- Place of death: Bauru, Brazil
- Position: Forward

Youth career
- Batatais

Senior career*
Years	Team	Apps	(Gls)
1954–1956	Batatais		
1956–1960	Portuguesa	64	(32)
1960–1967	Noroeste	286	(129)
1967–1968	Juventus-SP		
1969	Londrina		
- * Club domestic league appearances and goals as of 29 January 2024

José Carlos Coelho (9 January 1936 – 21 October 2017), better known as Zé Carlos, was a Brazilian professional footballer who played as a forward.

== Career ==
Born in Batatais, Zé Carlos arrived at Portuguesa in 1956, and for the club he played alongside great players such as Djalma Santos and Brandãozinho. On total, played 64 matches and scored 22 goals for the club. He played for Noroeste in 1960 and 1967 and made history, being the first player to score at the Alfredo de Castilho stadium, in addition to playing 286 matches and scoring 129 goals for the club, a historic record. He also played for CA Juventus and Londrina EC.

== Death ==
Zé Carlos died on 21 October 2017, at the age of 81 in Vila Alpina, Bauru, a victim of cancer.
