= 1965 Torneio Rio-São Paulo =

Torneio Rio-São Paulo
- Season: 1965
- Champions: Palmeiras (3rd title)
- Matches: 73
- Goals: 258 (3.53 per match)
- Top goalscorer: Ademar Pantera (Palmeiras); Flávio Minuano (Corinthians) – 14 goals each
- Biggest home win: Palmeiras 7–1 Santos (31 Mar)
- Biggest away win: Botafogo 2–7 Fluminense (12 May)

The 1965 Torneio Rio São Paulo was the 18th edition of the Torneio Rio-São Paulo. It was disputed between 14 February to 23 May 1965.

== Participants ==
Team	City	Nº participations	Best result
America	Rio de Janeiro	13	5th (1951, 1962)
Botafogo	Rio de Janeiro	15	Champions: 1962, 1964 (shared)
Corinthians	(São Paulo (state)) São Paulo	18	Champions: 1950, 1953, 1954
Flamengo	Rio de Janeiro	17	Champions: 1961
Fluminense	Rio de Janeiro	17	Champions: 1957, 1960
Palmeiras	(São Paulo (state)) São Paulo	18	Champions: 1933, 1951
Portuguesa	(São Paulo (state)) São Paulo	18	Champions: 1952, 1955
Santos	(São Paulo (state)) Santos	14	Champions: 1959, 1963, 1964 (shared)
São Paulo	(São Paulo (state)) São Paulo	18	Runners-up: 1933, 1962
Vasco da Gama	Rio de Janeiro	18	Champions: 1958

== Format ==
The tournament were disputed in a two stages. In the first, clubs were split in two groups: Group A, with the teams of São Paulo, and Group B, with the teams of Rio de Janeiro. The club with the best performance in this stage were qualified to finals, clubs from second to fourth places were qualified to the second stage. In the second stage, clubs played a single round-robin tournament. The club with the best performance in second stage, were qualified to the finals.

== Tournament ==
Following is the summary of the 1965 Torneio Rio-São Paulo tournament:

=== First round ===
Group A

Pos	Team	Pld	W	D	L	GF	GA	GD	Pts	Qualification
1	(São Paulo (state)) Palmeiras	9	7	2	0	31	13	+18	16	Qualified to finals and second round
2	(São Paulo (state)) Portuguesa	9	3	3	3	9	13	−4	9	Qualified to second round
3	(São Paulo (state)) Corinthians	9	2	5	2	18	17	+1	9	Qualified to second round
4	(São Paulo (state)) São Paulo	9	3	2	4	15	13	+2	8	Qualified to second round
5	(São Paulo (state)) Santos (E)	9	3	2	4	20	24	−4	8	

Source: RSSSF
Rules for classification: 1) points; 2) wins; 3) goal difference; 4) goals for.
(E) Eliminated

Group B

Pos	Team	Pld	W	D	L	GF	GA	GD	Pts	Qualification
1	Botafogo	9	5	2	2	21	16	+5	12	Qualified to second round
2	Vasco da Gama	9	5	1	3	17	12	+5	11	Qualified to second round
3	Flamengo	9	4	3	2	13	11	+2	11	Qualified to second round
4	Fluminense	9	1	2	6	10	21	−11	4	Qualified to second round
5	America (E)	9	0	2	7	8	22	−14	2	

Source: RSSSF
Rules for classification: 1) points; 2) wins; 3) goal difference; 4) goals for.
(E) Eliminated

=== Second round ===
Pos	Team	Pld	W	D	L	GF	GA	GD	Pts	Qualification
1	(São Paulo (state)) Palmeiras	7	5	1	1	18	7	+11	11	Qualified to finals
2	(São Paulo (state)) São Paulo	7	4	0	3	17	20	−3	8	
3	(São Paulo (state)) Portuguesa	7	2	4	1	11	11	0	8	
4	Fluminense	7	2	2	3	16	13	+3	6	
5	(São Paulo (state)) Corinthians	7	2	2	3	11	10	+1	6	
6	Vasco da Gama	7	2	2	3	7	10	−3	6	
7	Flamengo	7	2	2	3	6	10	−4	6	
8	Botafogo	7	2	1	4	10	15	−5	5	

Source: RSSSF
Rules for classification: 1) points; 2) wins; 3) goal difference; 4) goals for.

As Palmeiras was the winner of both rounds, it was automatically declared the champions.

== Final standings ==
Pos	Team	Pld	W	D	L	GF	GA	GD	Pts
1	(São Paulo (state)) Palmeiras (C)	16	12	3	1	49	20	+29	27
2	Vasco da Gama	16	7	3	6	24	22	+2	17
3	Botafogo	16	7	3	6	31	31	0	17
4	Flamengo	16	6	5	5	19	21	−2	17
5	(São Paulo (state)) Portuguesa	16	5	7	4	20	24	−4	17
6	(São Paulo (state)) São Paulo	16	7	2	7	32	33	−1	16
7	(São Paulo (state)) Corinthians	16	4	7	5	29	27	+2	15
8	Fluminense	16	3	4	9	26	34	−8	10
9	(São Paulo (state)) Santos	9	3	2	4	20	24	−4	8
10	America	9	0	2	7	8	22	−14	2

Source: RSSSF
Rules for classification: 1) points; 2) wins; 3) goal difference; 4) goals for.
(C) Champions
