= Norival Ponce de León =

Brazilian footballer (1927–1965)

Ponce de León
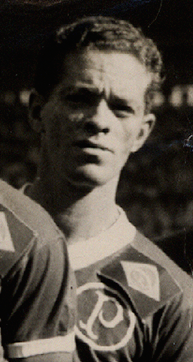

Personal information
- Full name: Norival Cabral Ponce de León
- Date of birth: August 28, 1927
- Place of birth: Rio de Janeiro, Brazil
- Date of death: 5 June 1965 (aged 37)
- Place of death: São Paulo, Brazil
- Position: Forward

Senior career*
| Years | Team | Apps | (Gls) |
| 1947 | Botafogo | | |
| 1948–1951 | São Paulo | 109 | (52) |
| 1951–1953 | Palmeiras | 65 | (28) |
| 1953–1955 | Ypiranga | | |
| 1955–1956 | Noroeste | | |
| 1956–1957 | Botafogo | | |
| 1957 | Ferroviária | | |
| 1959 | Comercial | | |
- * Club domestic league appearances and goals as of 29 August 2023

Norival Cabral Ponce de León (28 August 1927 – 5 June 1965) was a Brazilian professional footballer who played as forward.

== Career ==
He was nicknamed Argentinian, due to his fierce style of play. Even though he was from Rio de Janeiro, he spent most of his career in clubs in São Paulo.

== Honours ==
=== Botafogo ===
- Torneio Início: 1947

=== São Paulo ===
- Campeonato Paulista: 1948, 1949
- Taça dos Campeões Estaduais Rio-São Paulo: 1948

=== Palmeiras ===
- Copa Rio: 1951

== Death ==
He died at the age of 37 from an unknown illness.
