= Bibe =

Brazilian footballer

Personal information
- Full name: Olímpio Gabriel
- Date of birth: 7 November 1925
- Place of birth: São Paulo, Brazil
- Date of death: 17 February 2012 (aged 86)
- Place of death: São Paulo, Brazil
- Position: Midfielder

Youth career
- Ypiranga

Senior career*
Years	Team	Apps	(Gls)
1947–1950	Ypiranga		
1951–1953	São Paulo		
1953–1958	Ponte Preta		
1959–1960	São Paulo		
1961–1963	Ponte Preta		
- * Club domestic league appearances and goals as of 13 September 2023

Olímpio Gabriel (7 November 1925 – 17 February 2012), better known by the nickname Bibe, was a Brazilian professional footballer who played as a midfielder.

== Career ==
Bibe, who began his career at Ypiranga, stood out for his quality in the midfield and made history at São Paulo FC and AA Ponte Preta. At São Paulo he had 153 appearances and scored 38 goals. At Ponte Preta he made 348 appearances and 88 goals.

== Death ==
Bibe died at the age of 86 from Alzheimer's disease.
