= Agostinho Zeola =

Brazilian footballer

Zeola
Personal information
- Full name: Agostinho Zeola
- Date of birth: 15 May 1934
- Place of birth: Álvares Machado, Brazil
- Date of death: 13 March 2014 (aged 79)
- Place of death: Bauru, Brazil
- Height: 1.69 m (5 ft 7 in)
- Position: Forward

Youth career
- Jaboticabal

Senior career*
Years	Team	Apps	(Gls)
1952–1954	Noroeste		
1954	São Paulo		
1955–1957	Juventus-SP	155	(55)
1957–1958	Napoli		
1959–1961	Juventus-SP		
1961–1962	Palmeiras	44	(13)
1963	Independiente		
1964	Guarani		
1964	Fluminense		
1965	Junior		
1966–1968	Tupã		

International career
1961	Brazil	1	(0)
- * Club domestic league appearances and goals as of 15 January 2024

Agostinho Zeola (15 May 1934 – 13 March 2014), was a Brazilian professional footballer who played as a forward.

== Career ==
A born goalscorer, Agostinho Zeola gained prominence by being the main player in the Noroeste title in the second division of São Paulo (current Série A2), where he was top scorer and decided the final match with two goals. He had a brief spell at São Paulo and eventually moved to Juventus, where he also made history by making 155 appearances and scoring 55 goals. He played for other prominent teams around the world such as Napoli, Independiente and Junior Barranquilla, as well as Palmeiras, Fluminense, Guarani and Tupã, where he ended his career in 1969.

== International career ==
Zeola played just one match for Brazil in 1961, in the Taça Oswaldo Cruz against Paraguay.

== Honours ==
Noroeste

- Campeonato Paulista Série A2: 1953

Independiente

- Argentine Primera División: 1963

Brazil

- Taça Oswaldo Cruz: 1961

== Death ==
Zeola died on 13 March 2014 in his living quarters, in a nursing home in the city of Bauru, at the age of 79.
