= Marília Futebol Clube =

Marília
- Full name: Marília Futebol Clube
- Nickname(s): Azulão da BR 010; Papão de títulos
- Founded: November 22, 1984; 40 years ago
- Ground: Pereirão, Imperatriz, Maranhão state, Brazil
- Capacity: 6,000
Home colours	Away colours

Marília Futebol Clube, commonly known as Marília, is a Brazilian football club based in Imperatriz, Maranhão state.

== History ==
The club was founded on November 22, 1984. The club competed in the Campeonato Maranhense Second Level for the first time in 2008.

== Stadium ==
Marília Futebol Clube play their home games at Estádio Municipal José Pereira Rego, nicknamed Pereirão. The stadium has a maximum capacity of 6,000 people.
