= Walter Taibo =

Uruguayan footballer (1931–2021)

Wálter Taibo
Personal information
- Full name: Wálter Taibo Martínez
- Date of birth: 7 March 1931
- Place of birth: Uruguay
- Date of death: 10 January 2021 (aged 89)
- Position: Goalkeeper

Senior career*
Years	Team	Apps	(Gls)
1953–1959	Nacional		(-)
1959–1960	Huracán	41	(-)
1961–1966	Wanderers		(-)
1966–1967	Peñarol		(-)
1968	Sud América		(-)

International career
1955–1966	Uruguay	30	(-)
- * Club domestic league appearances and goals

Wálter Taibo Martínez (7 March 1931 – 10 January 2021) was a Uruguayan football goalkeeper who played for Uruguay in the 1966 FIFA World Cup. He also played for C.A. Peñarol. In Argentina, he played for Huracán in 1959-60.
