= 1950 Torneio Rio-São Paulo =

Torneio Rio-São Paulo
- Season: 1950
- Champions: Corinthians (1st title)
- Matches played: 28
- Goals scored: 144 (5.14 per match)
- Top goalscorer: Baltazar (Corinthians) – 9 goals
- Biggest home win: Flamengo 6–2 Corinthians (22 Dec 1949)

The 1950 Torneio Rio São Paulo was the 4th edition of the Torneio Rio-São Paulo. It was disputed between 15 December 1949 to 15 February 1950.

== Participants ==
| Team | City | Nº participations | Best result |
|---|---|---|---|
| Botafogo | Rio de Janeiro | 2 | 1940 |
| Corinthians | (São Paulo (state)) São Paulo | 4 | 6th (1933) |
| Flamengo | Rio de Janeiro | 3 | 1934, 1940 |
| Fluminense | Rio de Janeiro | 4 | 7th (1933) |
| Palmeiras | (São Paulo (state)) São Paulo | 4 | Champions: 1933 |
| Portuguesa | (São Paulo (state)) São Paulo | 4 | 3rd (1933, 1950) |
| São Paulo | (São Paulo (state)) São Paulo | 4 | Runners-up: 1933 |
| Vasco da Gama | Rio de Janeiro | 4 | 5th (1933) |

== Format ==
The tournament were disputed in a single round-robin format, with the club with most points conquered being the champions.

== Tournament ==
Following is the summary of the 1950 Torneio Rio-São Paulo tournament:

| Pos | Team | Pld | W | D | L | GF | GA | GD | Pts |
|---|---|---|---|---|---|---|---|---|---|
| 1 | (São Paulo (state)) Corinthians (C) | 7 | 5 | 1 | 1 | 20 | 15 | +5 | 11 |
| 2 | Vasco da Gama | 7 | 4 | 2 | 1 | 18 | 12 | +6 | 10 |
| 3 | (São Paulo (state)) Portuguesa | 7 | 4 | 1 | 2 | 27 | 26 | +1 | 9 |
| 4 | (São Paulo (state)) Palmeiras | 7 | 3 | 1 | 3 | 14 | 15 | −1 | 7 |
| 5 | Flamengo | 7 | 2 | 2 | 3 | 18 | 17 | +1 | 6 |
| 6 | (São Paulo (state)) São Paulo | 7 | 2 | 1 | 4 | 18 | 23 | −5 | 5 |
| 7 | Fluminense | 7 | 2 | 0 | 5 | 14 | 18 | −4 | 4 (Note: Tied in points) |
| 8 | Botafogo | 7 | 1 | 2 | 4 | 15 | 18 | −3 | 4 |

Source: RSSSF
Rules for classification: 1) points; 2) wins; 3) goal difference; 4) goals for.
(C) Champions
