= Filpo Núñez =

Argentine football manager

Nélson Ernesto Filpo Núñez (19 August 1920 – 6 March 1999) was an Argentine professional footballer and later football manager.

== Early life ==
He was born in 1920 in Argentina. He retired from playing professional football at the age of twenty-eight.

== Career ==
In 1965, he was appointed manager of the Brazil national football team. He became the third foreign manager to manage the team.

== Personal life ==
He died on 6 March 1999 in Brazil. He was the uncle of Argentine football manager Eduardo Coudet.
