= Esporte Clube Corinthians =

Corinthians de Presidente Prudente
- Full name: Esporte Clube Corinthians
- Nicknames: Coringão de Prudente; Corintinha; Jerônimo do Sertão
- Founded: February 8, 1945
- Dissolved: 2001
- Ground: Prudentão
- Capacity: 44,414
Home colours	Away colours

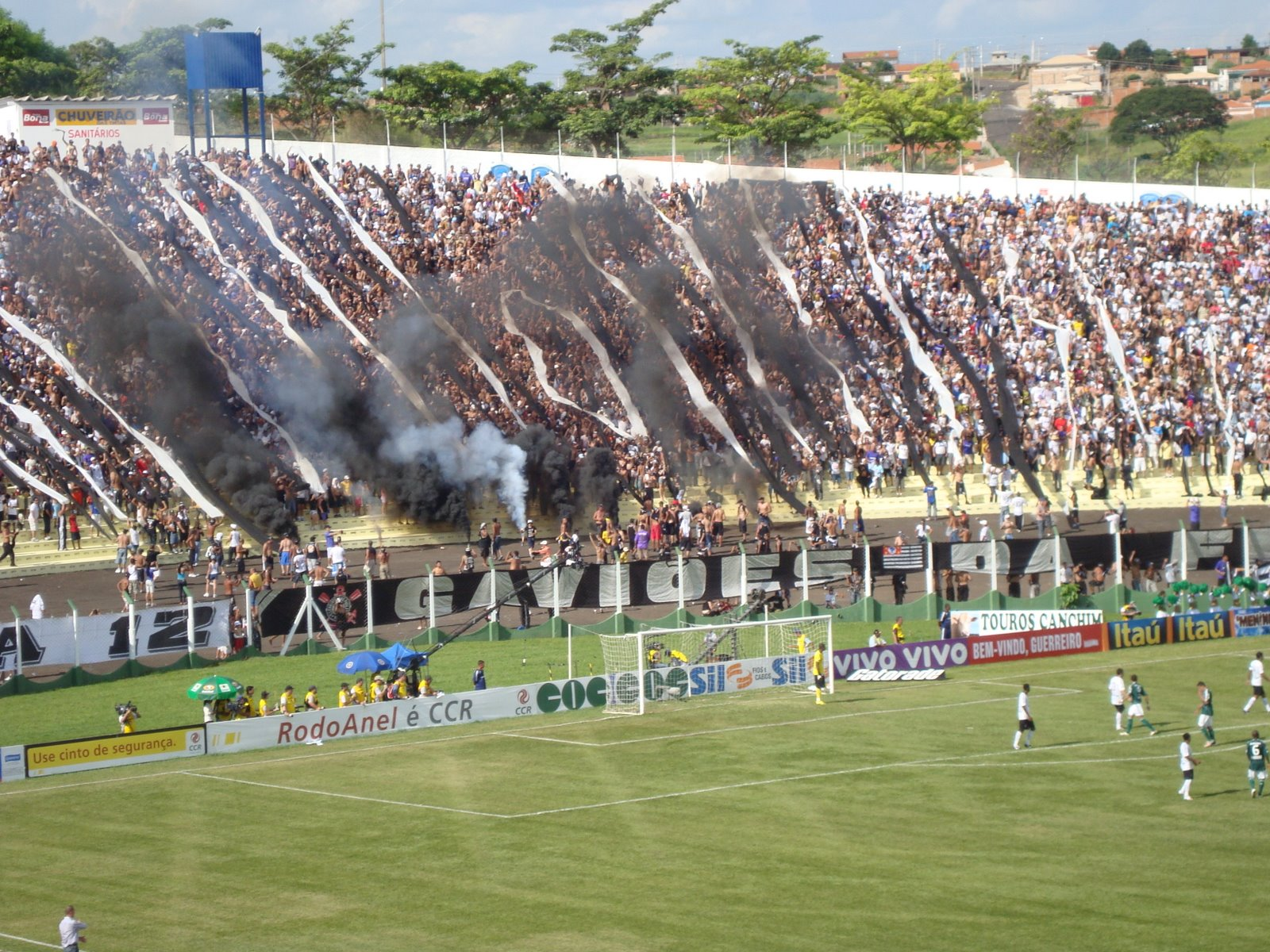
State championship match between Corinthians and Palmeiras in the Prudentão 2009

Esporte Clube Corinthians, commonly known as Corinthians de Presidente Prudente, was a Brazilian football club based in Presidente Prudente, São Paulo state. They competed in the Série C once.

== History ==
The club was founded on February 8, 1945, Corinthians won the Campeonato Paulista Série A2 in 1959. named after Sport Club Corinthians Paulista. They competed in the Série C in 1996, when they were eliminated in the Second Stage by Rio Branco-PR. The club eventually folded.

== Honours ==
- Campeonato Paulista Série A2
  - Winners (1): 1959

== Stadium ==
Esporte Clube Corinthians played their home games at Estádio Eduardo José Farah, nicknamed Farahzão. The stadium has a maximum capacity of 44,414 people.
