= 1966 Campeonato Paulista =

Campeonato Paulista – Série A1
- Season: 1966
- Champions: Palmeiras
- Relegated: Bragantino; Noroeste
- Torneio Roberto Gomes Pedrosa: Santos; Palmeiras; São Paulo; Corinthians; Portuguesa
- Taça Brasil: Palmeiras
- Matches played: 210
- Goals scored: 689 (3.28 per match)
- Best Player: Toninho Guerreiro (Santos)
- Top goalscorer: Toninho Guerreiro (Santos) – 27 goals
- Biggest home win: Comercial 5-0 Botafogo (August 28, 1966); Portuguesa Santista 5-0 América (December 3, 1966)
- Biggest away win: Comercial 1-5 Palmeiras (December 7, 1966)
- Highest scoring: Santos 7-5 Comercial (October 13, 1966)

The 1966 Campeonato Paulista de Futebol da Divisão Especial de Profissionais, organized by the Federação Paulista de Futebol, was the 65th season of São Paulo's top professional football league. Palmeiras won the title for the 15th time. Bragantino and Noroeste were relegated and the top scorer was Santos's Toninho Guerreiro with 27 goals. This was the first time since 1957 that a player other than Pelé emerged as the season's top scorer.

== Championship ==
The championship was disputed in a double-round robin system, with the team with the most points winning the title and the two teams with the fewest points being relegated.

Pos	Team	Pld	W	D	L	GF	GA	GD	Pts	Qualification or relegation
1	Palmeiras	28	20	3	5	65	31	+34	43	Champions
2	Corinthians	28	17	5	6	57	33	+24	39	
3	Santos	28	16	6	6	70	42	+28	38	
4	Comercial	28	13	8	7	58	47	+11	34	
5	São Paulo	28	12	10	6	45	35	+10	34	
6	Portuguesa	28	12	4	12	45	44	+1	28	
7	Botafogo	28	11	5	12	53	65	−12	27	
8	Prudentina	28	10	6	12	46	46	0	26	
9	São Bento	28	8	9	11	38	44	−6	25	
10	Portuguesa Santista	28	7	11	10	34	41	−7	25	
11	América	28	11	0	17	49	57	−8	22	
12	Juventus	28	7	8	13	26	44	−18	22	
13	Guarani	28	9	3	16	34	43	−9	21	Playouts
14	Noroeste	28	7	7	14	33	57	−24	21	Playouts
15	Bragantino	28	7	1	20	36	60	−24	15	Relegated

Updated to match(es) played on December 19, 1966. Source: RSSSF.com
Rules for classification: 1) points; 2) goal difference; 3) wins; 4) number of goals scored.

=== Playouts ===
22 December 1966

Guarani	3 – 1	Noroeste
Carlinhos 6'; Wagner 15'; Oswaldo 76'	Report	Zé Carlos 5'

Pacaembu, São Paulo
Referee: Olten Ayres de Abreu

== Top Scores ==
Rank	Player	Club	Goals
1	Toninho Guerreiro	Santos	27
2	Paulo Bin	Comercial	22
3	Ademar Pantera	Palmeiras	19
4	Flávio Minuano	Corinthians	16
5	Servílio	Palmeiras	15
6	Babá	São Paulo	13
7	Alberto Gallardo	Palmeiras	12
7	Rivellino	Corinthians	12
7	Prado	São Paulo	12
7	Pelé	Santos	12
11	Américo Murolo	Guarani	11
