= Edmur Ribeiro =

Brazilian footballer and manager (1929-2007)

Personal information
- Full name: Edmur Pinto Ribeiro
- Date of birth: September 9, 1929
- Place of birth: Saquarema, RJ, Brazil
- Date of death: September 25, 2007 (aged 78)
- Place of death: Niterói, RJ, Brazil
- Position: Forward

Senior career*
Years	Team	Apps	(Gls)
1948	Flamengo	-	(-)
1952–1953	Vasco da Gama	-	(-)
1953–1957	Portuguesa	-	(-)
1958	Náutico	-	(-)
1958–1961	Vitória de Guimarães	72	(56)
1961–1962	Celta de Vigo	14	(2)
1962–1963	Leixões	26	(9)
1965–1966	Deportivo Italia	-	(-)

International career
1955	Brazil	1	(0)

Managerial career
- Fafe
- Gil Vicente
- Aliados de Lordelo
- * Club domestic league appearances and goals

Edmur Pinto Ribeiro (Saquarema, 9 September 1929 – Niterói, 25 September 2007) was a Brazilian professional football player and manager.

== Playing career ==
During his career, he played for clubs in Venezuela, Brazil, Portugal and Spain. In the season of 1959-60 of the Portuguese championship he was the best scorer, with 25 goals on the service of Vitória de Guimarães. Edmur made 14 league appearances for Celta de Vigo during the 1961–62 Segunda División season.

Edmur made one appearance for the Brazil national football team, a friendly international against Paraguay on 17 November 1955.

== Career as a manager ==
After he retired from playing, Edmur became a football manager in Portugal.
