= 1967 Campeonato Brasileiro Série A (Torneio Roberto Gomes Pedrosa) =

Campeonato Brasileiro Série A
- Season: 1967
- Dates: 5 March – 8 June
- Champions: Palmeiras (2nd title)
- Matches: 117
- Goals: 316 (2.7 per match)
- Top goalscorer: César Maluco; Ademar Pantera (15 goals)
- Total attendance: 2,403,765
- Average attendance: 20,545

The 1967 Campeonato Brasileiro Série A (officially the 1967 Torneio Roberto Gomes Pedrosa) was the 10th edition of the Campeonato Brasileiro Série A. It began on March 5 and ended on June 8. Palmeiras won the championship, the 2nd national title of the club in 8 years of tournament contention. This 1st edition of the tournament was organized by Federação de Futebol do Estado do Rio de Janeiro and Federação Paulista de Futebol.

== Championship format ==
- First-phase: the 15 participants play all against all twice, but divided into two groups (one 7 and one 8) for classification, in the Group B, each team plays two more matches against any other. The first 2 of each group are classified for the finals.
- Final-phase: the four clubs classified play all against all twice. The club with most points at this stage is the champion.
- Tie-breaking criteria:

1 - Goal difference
2 - Raffle

- With one victory, a team still gained 2 points, instead of 3.

== First phase ==
=== Group A ===
Pos	Team	Pld	W	D	L	GF	GA	GD	Pts
1	Corinthians	14	9	4	1	29	13	+16	22
2	Internacional	14	5	6	3	18	16	+2	16
3	Cruzeiro	14	6	2	6	23	19	+4	14
4	Bangu	14	5	4	5	16	21	−5	14
5	São Paulo	14	3	7	4	18	13	+5	13
6	Fluminense	14	4	3	7	21	29	−8	11
7	Botafogo	14	1	7	6	12	21	−9	9

=== Group B ===
Pos	Team	Pld	W	D	L	GF	GA	GD	Pts
1	Palmeiras	14	7	5	2	31	21	+10	19
2	Grêmio	14	6	6	2	20	11	+9	18
3	Portuguesa	14	6	5	3	24	18	+6	17
4	Santos	14	5	5	4	21	16	+5	15
5	Atlético Mineiro	14	5	4	5	18	21	−3	14
6	Flamengo	14	3	6	5	23	24	−1	12
7	Vasco	14	3	6	5	10	21	−11	12
8	Ferroviário	14	0	4	10	9	26	−17	4

== Final phase ==
Pos	Team	Pld	W	D	L	GF	GA	GD	Pts
1	Palmeiras	6	3	3	0	8	5	+3	9
2	Internacional	6	2	3	1	6	3	+3	7
3	Corinthians	6	2	1	3	5	8	−3	5
4	Grêmio	6	0	3	3	4	7	−3	3

Matches:

20 May 1967
16:00 UTC−03:00

Corinthians	2 – 1	Grêmio

Pacaembu, São Paulo

21 May 1967
16:00 UTC−03:00

Internacional	1 – 2	Palmeiras

Olímpico, Porto Alegre

24 May 1967
16:00 UTC−03:00

Corinthians	2 – 2	Palmeiras

Pacaembu, São Paulo

24 May 1967
16:00 UTC−03:00

Grêmio	1 – 1	Internacional

Olímpico, Porto Alegre

28 May 1967
16:00 UTC−03:00

Corinthians	0 – 1	Internacional

Pacaembu, São Paulo

28 May 1967
16:00 UTC−03:00

Grêmio	1 – 1	Palmeiras

Olímpico, Porto Alegre

1 June 1967
16:00 UTC−03:00

Palmeiras	0 – 0	Internacional

Palestra Itália, São Paulo

1 June 1967
16:00 UTC−03:00

Grêmio	0 – 1	Corinthians

Olímpico, Porto Alegre

4 June 1967
16:00 UTC−03:00

Palmeiras	1 – 0	Corinthians

Pacaembu, São Paulo

4 June 1967
16:00 UTC−03:00

Internacional	0 – 0	Grêmio

Olímpico, Porto Alegre

7 June 1967
16:00 UTC−03:00

Internacional	3 – 0	Corinthians

Olímpico, Porto Alegre

8 June 1967
16:00 UTC−03:00

Palmeiras	2 – 1	Grêmio

Pacaembu, São Paulo

Campeonato Brasileiro Série A
1967 champions

2nd title

== Sources ==
- 1967 Torneio Roberto Gomes Pedrosa at RSSSF
- Torneio Roberto Gomes Pedrosa at Futebol Nacional.com.br
- 1967 Torneio Roberto Gomes Pedrosa at RSSSF
