= South American Access Championship =

- Organiser(s): AFA; CBF; FFCh; APF; FPF; AUF
- Founded: 1962
- Abolished: 1994; 32 years ago
- Region: South America
- Teams: 5
- Last champions: Paraguay (1994)
- Most championships: Brazil (2 titles)

The South American Access Championship (Spanish: Campeonato Sudamericano de Ascenso, Portuguese: Campeonato Sulamericano de Acesso), was a tournament between national teams from South America that were formed only by athletes who did not disputed their national top league level.

In 1994, thirty years after the second edition, a third edition of the Sudamericano de Ascenso was held in Paraguay and won by the local team. Brazil is the most successful team with 2 titles.

== Format ==
The championship was played under a single round-robin format, with all its matches played at night. Rules stated that in case of two teams finished tied on points at the end of the championship, they had to play a playoff match with extra time if necessary. In case the tie persisted, both teams would be crowned champions sharing the title.

== History ==
The first edition was contested by Argentina, Brazil, Chile, Paraguay, and host Peru. Argentina was represented by the complete Nueva Chicago team (plus four players from other clubs), Peru by KDT Nacional (champion of 1961 Second Division), Brazil by Santista (reinforced with Portuguesa Santista players), and Chile by club Unión San Felipe. Brazil uses the São Paulo countryside team.

The 1964 edition held in January in Buenos Aires also served as a qualifier for the 1963 Pan American Games. As Brazil did not want to participate alleging that their players were on vacation, some Argentine executives travelled to convince their colleagues. The mission was successful so Brazil contested the competition but with a team formed by players competing in Campeonato Carioca (First Division). Huracán and Independiente were the venues for the tournament while all the matches were broadcast live by Canal 7.

For the 1964 edition, Uruguay took place of Chile, maintaining the number of five participants of the first edition. The title of the second edition was decided in a tiebreaker game between Brazil and Argentina, which also ended in a draw (1–1) and guaranteed the conquest for the Brazilians through the average of goals scored.

A third edition of this competition was held in the Paraguayan cities of Ciudad del Este and Encarnación in 1994. Paraguay won their first title after beating Argentina 3–1 in front of 10,000 spectators. The "Sudamericano de Ascenso" was discontinued since then.

== Results ==
Ed.	Year	Host cities	Winners	Runners-up	N° teams
1	1962	Lima	Brazil	Argentina	5
2	1964	Buenos Aires	Brazil	Argentina	5
3	1994	Ciudad del Este	Paraguay	Argentina	6
3	1994	Encarnación	Paraguay	Argentina	6
