= 1951 Torneio Rio-São Paulo =

Torneio Rio-São Paulo
- Season: 1951
- Champions: Palmeiras (2nd title)
- Matches played: 30
- Goals scored: 150 (5 per match)
- Top goalscorer: Ademir (Vasco da Gama); Aquiles (Palmeiras); Liminha (Palmeiras) – 9 goals each

The 1951 Torneio Rio São Paulo was the 5th edition of the Torneio Rio-São Paulo. It was disputed between 30 January to 11 April.

== Participants ==
Team	City	Nº participations	Best result
America	Rio de Janeiro	4	8th (1933)
Bangu	Rio de Janeiro	3	4th (1933)
Corinthians	(São Paulo (state)) São Paulo	5	Champions: 1950
Flamengo	Rio de Janeiro	4	5th (1950)
Palmeiras	(São Paulo (state)) São Paulo	5	Champions: 1933
Portuguesa	(São Paulo (state)) São Paulo	5	3rd (1933, 1950)
São Paulo	(São Paulo (state)) São Paulo	5	Runners-up: 1933
Vasco da Gama	Rio de Janeiro	5	Runners-up: 1950

== Torneio Início ==
A Torneio Início was also held, similar to those played in the Carioca and São Paulo championships. The matches were played on the same day (30 January) at the Estádio do Maracanã. Each match lasted 30 minutes, with the number of corner kicks serving as an immediate tiebreaker.

Quarterfinals

Team 1	Score	Team 2
Corinthians	0–0 (2–1 ck)	Flamengo
America	1–0	Portuguesa
Bangu	3–0	Palmeiras
Vasco da Gama	1–0	São Paulo

Semifinals

Team 1	Score	Team 2
Corinthians	0–2	Bangu
America	1–0	Vasco da Gama

Final

Team 1	Score	Team 2
Bangu	1–1 (2–0 ck)	America

== Format ==
The tournament were disputed in a single round-robin format, with the club with most points conquered being the champions.

== Tournament ==
Following is the summary of the 1951 Torneio Rio-São Paulo tournament:

Pos	Team	Pld	W	D	L	GF	GA	GD	Pts	Qualification
1	(São Paulo (state)) Palmeiras	7	5	0	2	25	14	+11	10	Tiebreaker playoff
2	(São Paulo (state)) Corinthians	7	4	2	1	20	12	+8	10	Tiebreaker playoff
3	Bangu	7	3	1	3	22	18	+4	7 (Note: Tied in points)	
4	Flamengo	7	3	1	3	15	19	−4	7	
5	(São Paulo (state)) Portuguesa	7	3	1	3	17	23	−6	7	
6	America	7	2	3	2	19	19	0	7	
7	Vasco da Gama	7	1	4	2	15	18	−3	6	
8	(São Paulo (state)) São Paulo	7	0	2	5	8	18	−10	2	

Source: RSSSF
Rules for classification: 1) points; 2) wins; 3) goal difference; 4) goals for.

=== Tiebreaker playoff ===
8 April 1951

Corinthians (São Paulo (state))	2–3	(São Paulo (state)) Palmeiras
Baltazar; Jackson	Report	Homero (o.g.); Aquiles; Liminha

Pacaembu, São Paulo
Referee: Antônio Musitano

11 April 1951

Palmeiras (São Paulo (state))	3–1	(São Paulo (state)) Corinthians
Jair 17', 52'; Aquiles 33'	Report (Meu Timão); Report (Verdazzo)	Luizinho 34'

Pacaembu, São Paulo
Attendance: 54,465
Referee: Dante Rossi
