= Torneio Rio–São Paulo =

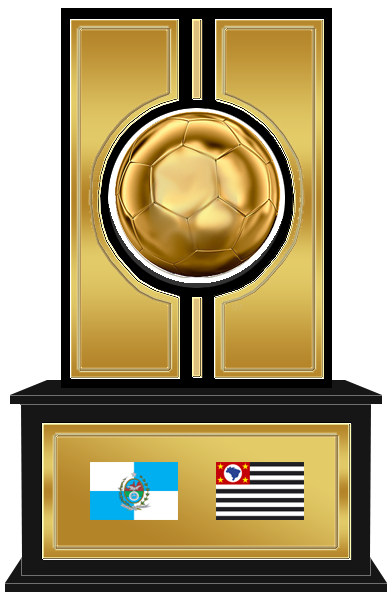
- Organiser(s): FPF
- Founded: 1933; 92 years ago (reestablished in 1993)
- Abolished: 2002; 23 years ago
- Region: Rio de Janeiro (state) and São Paulo (state), Brazil
- Qualifier for: Copa dos Campeões (2000–2002)
- Most championships: (São Paulo (state)) Palmeiras (5) (São Paulo (state)) Corinthians (5) (São Paulo (state)) Santos (5)

The Torneio Rio–São Paulo (English: Rio–São Paulo Tournament) was a traditional Brazilian football competition contested between São Paulo and Rio de Janeiro teams from 1933 to 1966, in 1993 and from 1997 to 2002.

Organized by the state football associations of the state of São Paulo and the city of Rio de Janeiro (after unification of the states of Guanabara and Rio de Janeiro), the official name of the tournament became the Torneio Roberto Gomes Pedrosa in 1954, named after former goalkeeper of the Brazilian national team and president of the São Paulo Football Association who died in that year. This name was not broadly popularized used until 1967 when the tournament was first opened to teams from the states of Minas Gerais, Paraná and Rio Grande do Sul, and later also from Pernambuco and Bahia. The Torneio Roberto Gomes Pedrosa, also often referred to as Taça de Prata (Silver Cup) and contested until 1970, is generally considered the predecessor of the Brazilian Football Championship which started in 1971.

Due to its continental size and historical peculiarities, Brazil has a short history of national competitions, with the modern Campeonato Brasileiro starting in 1971 supported by the military regime and only made possible due to the improvements in civil aviation and air transport. In 2010, the CBF officially recognized the expanded Torneio Roberto Gomes Pedrosa from 1967 to 1970 as a legitimate national championship, although as of 2022, the CBF does not officially recognize the pre-1967 Torneio Rio–São Paulo as a national championship. In the era prior to officially recognized national competition, given that the majority of Brazil's strongest teams were located in São Paulo and Rio de Janeiro, some historians consider that up until 1959, despite its schedule irregularity, the Torneio Rio–São Paulo was the most prestigious title for any team to claim outside of state championships.

From 2000 to 2002, the Torneio Rio–São Paulo champions were granted qualification to the Copa dos Campeões.

== List of champions ==
=== Round-robin format ===
Season	Champions	Runners-up
1933	(São Paulo (state)) Palestra Itália (1)	(São Paulo (state)) São Paulo
1934	Not finished	
1935–1939	Not held	
1940	Interrupted in the first half, there was no champion^{(1)}	
1941–1949	Not held	
1950	(São Paulo (state)) Corinthians (1)	Vasco da Gama
1951	(São Paulo (state)) Palmeiras (2)	(São Paulo (state)) Corinthians
1952	(São Paulo (state)) Portuguesa (1)	Vasco da Gama
1953	(São Paulo (state)) Corinthians (2)	Vasco da Gama
1954	(São Paulo (state)) Corinthians (3)	Fluminense
1955	(São Paulo (state)) Portuguesa (2)	(São Paulo (state)) Palmeiras
1956	Not held	
1957	Fluminense (1)	Flamengo; Vasco da Gama
1958	Vasco da Gama (1)	Flamengo
1959	(São Paulo (state)) Santos (1)	Vasco da Gama
1960	Fluminense (2)	Botafogo
1961	Flamengo (1)	Botafogo
1962	Botafogo (1)	(São Paulo (state)) São Paulo
1963	(São Paulo (state)) Santos (2)	(São Paulo (state)) Corinthians
1964	Botafogo (2) (São Paulo (state)) Santos (3)	—
1965	(São Paulo (state)) Palmeiras (3)	Vasco da Gama
1966	Botafogo (3) (São Paulo (state)) Corinthians (4) (São Paulo (state)) Santos (4); Vasco da Gama (2)	—

^{(1)} In 1940 the competition was interrupted with Flamengo and Fluminense in the lead, without the CBD making the title official, however, the clubs and newspapers at the time considered the result definitive and declared the Flamengo and Fluminense as the legitimate champions of the competition. Both Clubs currently consider themselves champions of the Competition and include this title among their achievements.

=== Knockout format ===
Season	Champions	Runners-up
1993	(São Paulo (state)) Palmeiras (4)	(São Paulo (state)) Corinthians
1994–1996	Not held	
1997	(São Paulo (state)) Santos (5)	(Rio de Janeiro (state)) Flamengo
1998	(Rio de Janeiro (state)) Botafogo (4)	(São Paulo (state)) São Paulo
1999	(Rio de Janeiro (state)) Vasco da Gama (3)	(São Paulo (state)) Santos
2000	(São Paulo (state)) Palmeiras (5)	(Rio de Janeiro (state)) Vasco da Gama
2001	(São Paulo (state)) São Paulo (1)	(Rio de Janeiro (state)) Botafogo
2002	(São Paulo (state)) Corinthians (5)	(São Paulo (state)) São Paulo

== Records and statistics ==
=== Titles by team ===
Rank	Club	Winners	Winning years	Runners-up	Runners-up years
1	(São Paulo (state)) Corinthians	5	1950, 1953, 1954, 1966 (shared), 2002	3	1951, 1963, 1993
1	(São Paulo (state)) Palmeiras	5	1933, 1951, 1965, 1993, 2000	1	1955
1	(São Paulo (state)) Santos	5	1959, 1936, 1964 (shared), 1966 (shared), 1997	1	1999
4	(Rio de Janeiro (state)) Botafogo	4	1962, 1964 (shared), 1966 (shared), 1998	3	1960, 1961, 2001
5	(Rio de Janeiro (state)) Vasco da Gama	3	1958, 1966 (shared), 1999	7	1950, 1952, 1953, 1957, 1959, 1965, 2000
6	(Rio de Janeiro (state)) Fluminense	2	1957, 1960	1	1954
6	(São Paulo (state)) Portuguesa	2	1952, 1955	0	—
8	(São Paulo (state)) São Paulo	1	2001	4	1933, 1962, 1998, 2002
8	(Rio de Janeiro (state)) Flamengo	1	1961	3	1957, 1958, 1997

== Titles by state ==
Rank	State	Wins
1	(São Paulo (state)) São Paulo	18
2	(Rio de Janeiro (state)) Rio de Janeiro	10

=== Participations ===
Club	App
(São Paulo (state)) Corinthians	26
(São Paulo (state)) Palmeiras	26
(Rio de Janeiro (state)) Vasco da Gama	26
(Rio de Janeiro (state)) Fluminense	25
(Rio de Janeiro (state)) Flamengo	25
(São Paulo (state)) São Paulo	25
(Rio de Janeiro (state)) Botafogo	23
(São Paulo (state)) Santos	22
(São Paulo (state)) Portuguesa	21
(Rio de Janeiro (state)) America	14
(Rio de Janeiro (state)) Bangu	8
(Rio de Janeiro (state)) Bonsucesso	2
(São Paulo (state)) AA São Bento	1
(Rio de Janeiro (state)) Americano	1
(São Paulo (state)) Guarani	1
(Rio de Janeiro (state)) Olaria	1
(São Paulo (state)) Paulista de Jundiaí	1
(São Paulo (state)) Ponte Preta	1
(São Paulo (state)) São Caetano	1
(Rio de Janeiro (state)) São Cristóvão	1
(São Paulo (state)) Ypiranga	1

- Includes 1934 edition

=== Top Scorers ===
Following is the list with all Torneio-Rio São Paulo top scorers:

Year	Top Scorer	Goals
1933	Waldemar de Brito (São Paulo)	33
1940	Leônidas (Flamengo)	13
1950	Baltazar (Corinthians)	9
1951	Ademir (Vasco da Gama); Aquiles (Palmeiras); Liminha (Palmeiras)	9
1952	Pinga (Portuguesa)	12
1953	Vasconcelos (Santos)	8
1954	Dino da Costa (Botafogo); Simões (America-RJ)	7
1955	Edmur (Portuguesa)	11
1957	Waldo (Fluminense)	13
1958	Gino Orlando (São Paulo)	12
1959	Henrique Frade (Flamengo)	9
1960	Quarentinha (Botafogo); Waldo (Fluminense)	11
1961	Coutinho (Santos); Pepe (Santos)	9
1962	Amarildo (Botafogo)	7
1963	Pelé (Santos)	14
1964	Coutinho (Santos)	11
1965	Ademar Pantera (Palmeiras); Flávio Minuano (Corinthians)	14
1966	Parada (Botafogo)	8
1993	Renato Gaúcho (Flamengo)	6
1997	Romário (Flamengo)	7
1998	Dodô (São Paulo)	5
1999	Alessandro Cambalhota (Santos); Bebeto (Botafogo); Guilherme (Vasco da Gama)	5
2000	Romário (Vasco da Gama)	12
2001	França (São Paulo)	6
2002	França (São Paulo)	19

=== Winning managers ===
Year	Manager	Club
1933	Humberto Cabelli	Palestra Itália
1950	Christino Calaf	Corinthians
1951	(Uruguay) Ventura Cambón	Palmeiras
1952	(Argentina) Jim López	Portuguesa
1953	Rato Castelli	Corinthians
1954	Osvaldo Brandão	Corinthians
1955	Délio Neves	Portuguesa
1957	Sylvio Pirillo	Fluminense
1958	Gradim	Vasco da Gama
1959	Lula	Santos
1960	Zezé Moreira	Fluminense
1961	(Paraguay) Fleitas Solich	Flamengo
1962	Marinho Rodrigues	Botafogo
1963	Lula	Santos
1964	Ephigênio de Freitas	Botafogo
1964	Lula	Santos
1965	(Argentina) Filpo Núñez	Palmeiras
1966	Admildo Chirol	Botafogo
1966	Lula	Santos
1966	Osvaldo Brandão	Corinthians
1966	Zezé Moreira	Vasco da Gama
1993	Vanderlei Luxemburgo	Palmeiras
1997	Vanderlei Luxemburgo	Santos
1998	Gílson Nunes	Botafogo
1999	Antônio Lopes	Vasco da Gama
2000	Luiz Felipe Scolari	Palmeiras
2001	Vadão	São Paulo
2002	Carlos Alberto Parreira	Corinthians

=== Winning captains ===
1993-2002

Year	Captain	Club
1993	Cesar Sampaio	Palmeiras
1997	Ronaldão	Santos
1998	Marcelo Gonçalves	Botafogo
1999	Mauro Galvao	Vasco da Gama
2000	Cesar Sampaio	Palmeiras
2001	Carlos Miguel	São Paulo
2002	Ricardinho	Corinthians
