= Derby Paulista =

Football derby between Corinthians and Palmeiras

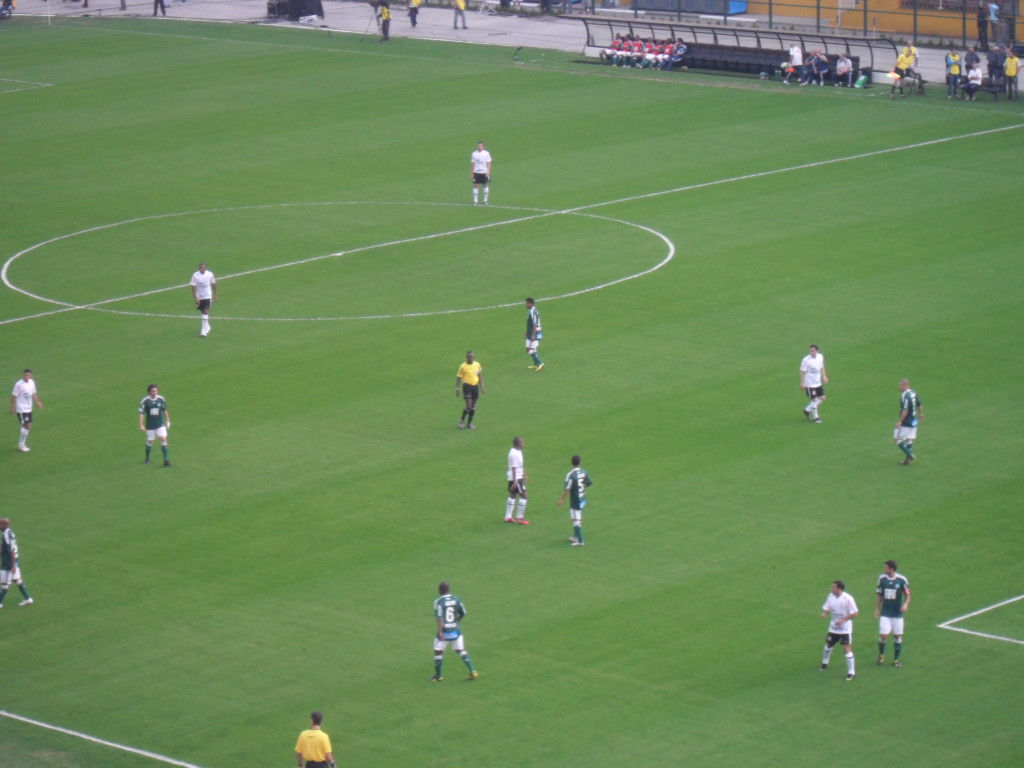
- Match between Palmeiras and Corinthians in 2010
- Other names: Dérbi; Dérbi Paulista
- Location: São Paulo, Brazil
- Teams: Corinthians; Palmeiras
- First meeting: 6 May 1917; Campeonato Paulista; Palestra Itália 3–0 Corinthians
- Latest meeting: 11 October 2026; Brazil Série A Palmeiras 4–1 Corinthians
- Stadiums: Neo Química Arena (Corinthians); Allianz Parque (Palmeiras)

Statistics
- Total meetings: 391
- Most wins: Palmeiras (138)
- Most player appearances: Ademir da Guia (57)
- Top scorer: Cláudio (21)
- All-time series: Corinthians: 133; Palmeiras: 138; Drawn: 120
- Largest victory: Palestra Itália 8–0 Corinthians; 5 November 1933

The Derby Paulista (English: Derby of São Paulo; Paulista is a gentilic for those born in São Paulo state), also called simply Dérbi, is an association football match between Sport Club Corinthians Paulista and Sociedade Esportiva Palmeiras, two traditional football clubs in the city of São Paulo. It is the rivalry between two of the oldest football clubs still active in the city of São Paulo. The Dérbi Paulista is ranked among the ten greatest derbies in the world. Journalist Tomás Mazzoni was the one who named the rivalry "O Derby", in reference to the most important horse race in the world, the Epsom Derby.

It is one of the biggest rivalries in world football: CNN considers it the ninth greatest derby in the world, the second in the Americas and the only one in Brazil to be among the main world rivalries. The Football Derbies website has placed The Paulista Derby as the 4th biggest rivalry in the world (and the first in Brazil), now ranked 8th in its world ranking, while the Brazilian magazine Trivela ranked it as the second biggest one in Brazil, behind the Grenal. Corinthians and Palmeiras have already decided state (Campeonato Paulista), regional (Torneio Rio-São Paulo) and national (Campeonato Brasileiro) level championships, plus a Copa Libertadores semi-finals and quarter-finals. No other Brazilian football rivalry has this many decisive encounters in major tournaments.

The rivalry between fans of the two clubs is also the biggest among the big fans in the state of São Paulo. A Datafolha survey in 2010 showed that 59% of Corinthians fans consider Palmeiras their biggest rival, while 77% of Palmeiras fans in the city consider Corinthians their biggest rival. In February 2017, a Datafolha survey released by the Folha de S. Paulo newspaper showed that the majority of the population in the city of São Paulo continued to consider the derby between Corinthians and Palmeiras as the one with the greatest rivalry in São Paulo. According to the survey, carried out between February 8 and 9, 2017, 35% of respondents rated the Derby Paulista as the biggest rivalry in the State of São Paulo.

== The beginning of the rivalry – 1910s and 1920s ==
Corinthians was founded in 1910, associated with the lower classes of São Paulo society. Its name was inspired by Corinthian FC, from London, which was on a tour in Brazil at the time. Palmeiras was founded in 1914, as the representative of the huge Italian community of São Paulo, with the name Palestra Italia. Their current name, Sociedade Esportiva Palmeiras, was adopted in 1942, during the Second World War, by an order of the government.

The first match between Palestra Itália and Corinthians, on May 6, 1917, ended in a 3–0 win for the palestrinos, with three goals scored by the striker Caetano. Two-time champions of the LPF Campeonato Paulista, in 1914 and in 1916, Corinthians had been unbeaten in 25 games for three years. That afternoon, at the Palestra Itália Stadium, Corinthians' streak was ended by the then newcomer, Palestra, which would become their bitterest rivals.

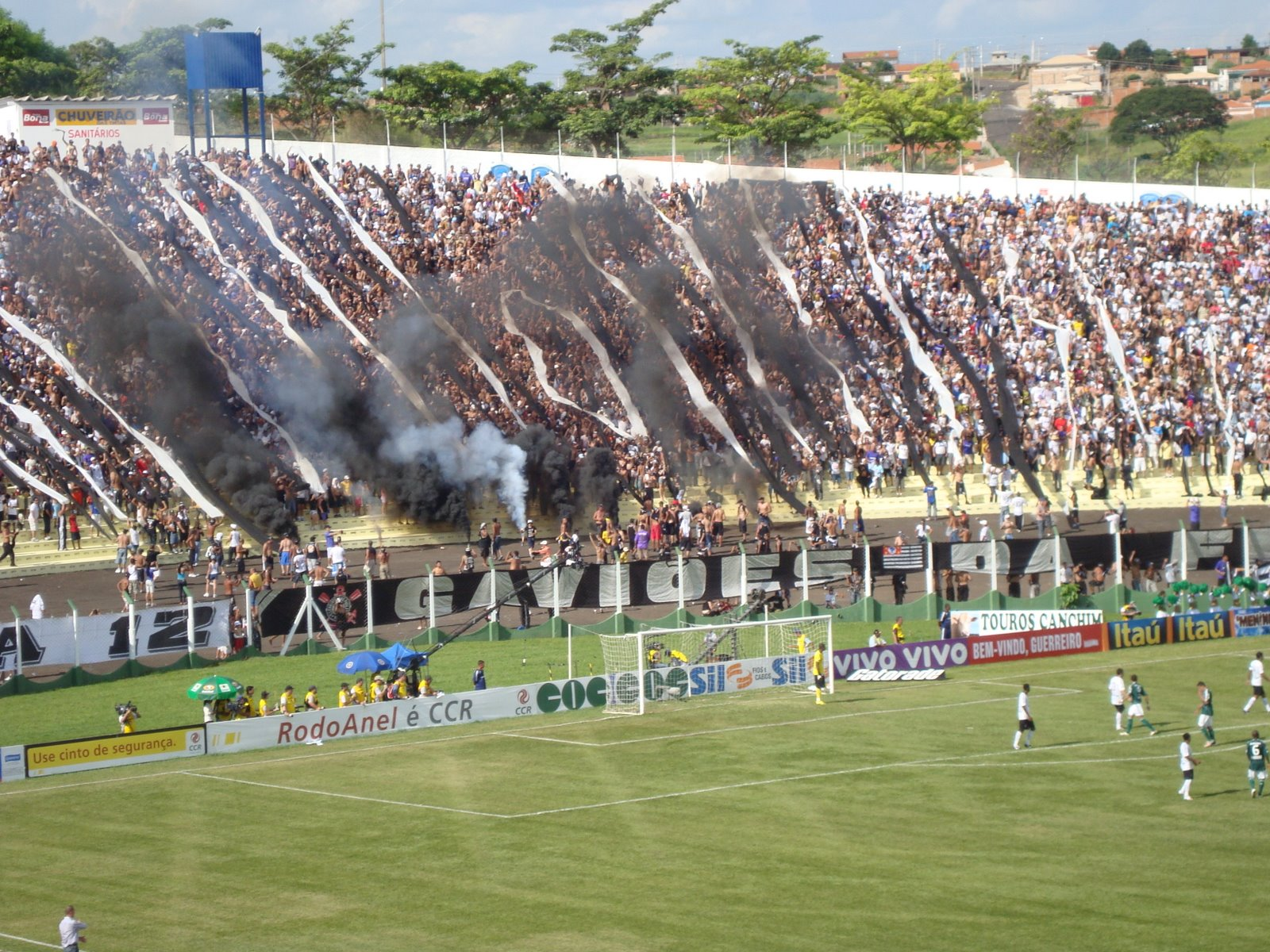
A Dérbi Paulista played in Presidente Prudente, in 2009

The third match between the two teams was on March 17, 1918. On the day of the game, the players of Palestra Itália passed in front of a pension where the Corinthians players were having lunch. The palestrinos took an ox bone, wrote "Corinthians is chicken soup for Palestra" on it and shot it the refectory. During their match, Palestra took the lead twice, but Corinthians managed to tie the game, which ended 3–3. Since then, Corinthians keeps the bone in their trophy cabinet.

The first Corinthians win in the derby was a 3–0 result, on May 3, 1919, with Américo, Garcia and Roverso scoring at the Estádio da Floresta.

In 1921, Corinthians, Palestra Itália and Paulistano, at the time the most winning team of the season, fought for the state title until the final rounds. In the last round, however, only Corinthians and Paulistano could ended up being the champions. Paulistano beat Sírio 3–2, reached 39 points and took the lead in the competition. Corinthians, with 38 points, had to face Palestra, with 36 points, in the last match of the championship. At that period of football, a win was worth two points, therefore, Corinthians would be the champion in case of a victory. Palestra and Corinthians played on Christmas, at the recently built Parque Antarctica, in a match that ended in a 3–0 win for the palestrinos and gave the title to Paulistano. This match is considered by many the one that consolidated their rivalry.

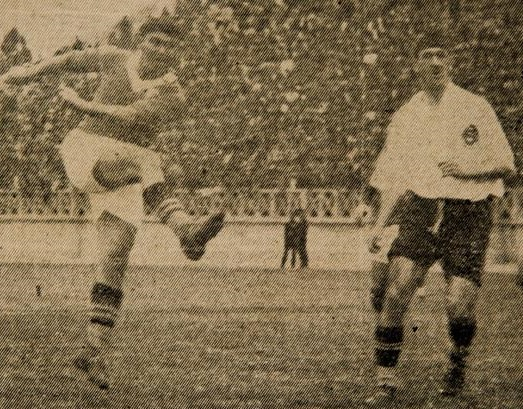
Romeu Pellicciari scoring one of his four goals against Corinthians in Palmeiras 8–0 win, in 1933

In 1929, when the Campeonato Paulista was organized by two different associations and Corinthians was champion by APEA, the most traditional of them. In the last round, the alvinegro took advantage of the fact that the palestrinos were playing with only ten players, as Heitor was injured during the match, to win the derby 4–1. This victory was worth the title of the competition, which had Santos as runner-up.

Palestra Itália's largest win in the history of the derby was on November 5, 1933, in a match played at the Palestra Itália Stadium, which was valid simultaneously for the Campeonato Paulista and the Rio-São Paulo Tournament of that year. With four goals by Romeu Pellicciari, one by Gabardo and three by Imparato, the alviverde defeated the alvinegro by a resounding 8–0, the biggest defeat in Corinthians' history. The impact of the thrashing was so huge to Corinthians that it overthrew the then president of club, Alfredo Schurig and caused some Corinthians fans to set fire to the headquarters of the club.

In the 1936 Campeonato Paulista, Corinthians and Palestra Itália made their first final in the history of the derby, as the alvinegro had won the first phase unbeaten and alviverde had won the second phase. The three games were played between April and May 1937. In the first match, at the Palestra Itália Stadium, the palestrinos won 1–0, with Corinthians leaving the field on the 31st minute of the second half, complaining of a foul on their goalkeeper. The second game, at Parque São Jorge, ended in a 0–0 draw. In the third match, at the Palestra Itália Stadium, Palestra won the final 2–1 and took the title.

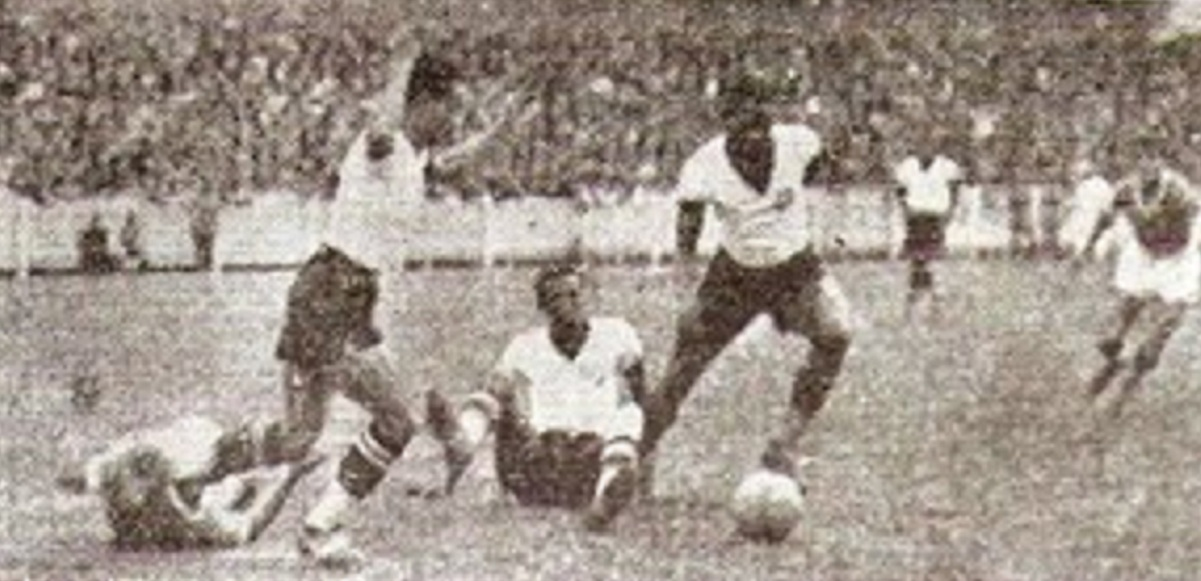
A Dérbi played at the Parque São Jorge in 1938

An unusual fact in the history of the Derby Paulista happened in 1938, that involved São Paulo FC and also the Portuguesa. In early July of that year, just after the 1938 World Cup, a financial crisis made São Paulo create a friendly tournament, called Taça Mündell Júnior, in order to raise money to solve part of their problems. On the occasion, Corinthians and Palmeiras played a match, which was known as the “Jogo das Barricas” ("The barrels' match"). The game ended in a 0–0 draw and the black and white of Parque São Jorge classified due to a highest number of corners. In the final, Corinthians defeated Portuguesa, which eliminated São Paulo in the semifinals. After the tournament, the tricolor rose in the following months and was runner-up of the Campeonato Paulista of that year, also won by Corinthians.

In 1938, the Campeonato Paulista was paralyzed in April for the World Cup that year. As a way to keep the football teams in the state active in an official competition, APEA created the II Campeonato Paulista Extra — the first edition was in 1926 — which ended up being decided between Palestra Itália and Corinthians. The first game of the finals, on 21 August, ended 0–0. In the last and decisive match, on 18 September, Palestra Itália won 2–1, clinching their second title of the competition, in its second edition.

== Rivalry in the 1940s ==
In 1940, the newly built Pacaembu Stadium — at the time, the biggest stadium in São Paulo — had its first champion being crowned after a decisive Derby Paulista. Palestra Itália, Corinthians, Atlético Mineiro, and Coritiba participated in the friendly Taça de São Paulo Nacional. After the semifinals, on May 5, both the palestrinos and the corintianos made to the final. With a 2–1 win, Palestra Itália won the first title at the Pacaembu.

In the period of greatest turmoil in the history of Palestra Itália, during the Second World War, when the club was forced to change its name due to the laws of the Vargas Dictatorship against associations that made references to the countries of the Axis, Corinthians was constantly victorious in the derbies. During the transition from Palestra Itália to Palmeiras, the club adopted the name of Palestra de São Paulo, from March to September 1942. In the meantime, they played four times against Corinthians. The first one was 4–1 defeat to the alvinegros, on March 28, in the Quinela de Ouro Tournament. Almost two months later, on May 27, Corinthians thrashed their rivals by the same score, in the Manoel Domingos Corrêa Cup. In the 1942 Campeonato Paulista, Palestra was undefeated in the championship and, on June 28, remained so after drawing their first derby against Corinthians 1–1. Days later, on July 15, for the Taça Cidade de São Paulo, Corinthians thrashed Palestra again, this time by 4–2.

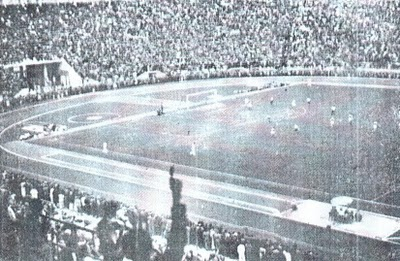
A Dérbi Paulista at the Pacaembu Stadium in 1942

After Palmeiras won its first title in their first game with their current name, defeating São Paulo and winning the 1942 Campeonato Paulista, in a match that became known as the "Arrancada Heroica", they still had to face Corinthians in the last round of the championship. The alvinegros took revenge of their 2–0 loss in the Derby in the last round of the previous year championship, that took away a possible undefeated title from them, as this time it was Corinthians who prevented Palmeiras from being crowned undefeated champions, by beating their rivals 3–1, on October 4, in the first Derby Paulista with the alviverdes' current name.

Palmeiras' first win in the Derby under its new name came only on May 23, 1943, in the first round of the 1943 Campeonato Paulista. The alviverde beat alvinegro 2–0, with two goals from midfielder Lima and an attendance of 63,344 people at the Pacaembu.

In 1945, the two rivals came together for a political cause. At the Pacaembu Stadium, Corinthians and Palmeiras played a historic friendly match that aimed to raise funds for the Brazilian Communist Party (PCB). The game ended with in 3–1 Palmeiras win, and that derby was portrayed years later in the book "Palmeiras x Corinthians 1945: O Jogo Vermelho", written by the politician Aldo Rebelo.

The second largest win in the history of the Derby Paulista took place on April 25, 1948. Palmeiras thrashed Corinthians 6–0 at the Pacaembu Stadium, in a match for the Taça Cidade de São Paulo.

== The Derby Paulista in the second half of the 20th century ==
The 1951 Torneio Rio-São Paulo was the second major competition that was decided by the two associations. The first leg took place on April 8 and Palmeiras won 3–2. In the second decisive match, on April 11, Palmeiras won again, this time by 3–1, with an attendance of 54,465 people at the Pacaembu. Jair Rosa Pinto (twice) and Aquiles scored for the Verdão, while Luizinho scored Corinthians' only goal.

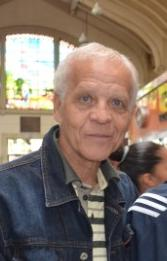
Ademir da Guia, considered the greatest player in the history of Palmeiras

The derby on January 18, 1953, was the match with most total goals in the history of the Dérbi Paulista. Corinthians defeated Palmeiras 6–4 in a Campeonato Paulista match at the Pacaembu Stadium. Cláudio, the all-time top scorer of the Dérbi, scored a hat-trick in that game, that was also the one in which the alvinegros scored more goals against their rivals.

In the penultimate round of the 1954 Campeonato Paulista, a very decisive Dérbi Paulista was played at the Pacaembu. On February 6, 1955, a draw would be enough for Corinthians to win the championship, meanwhile Palmeiras, which were in 2nd, needed to win the derby and hope for another Corinthians defeat in the last round, against São Paulo. In addition to that, this match was part of the celebrations for the 400th anniversary of the city of São Paulo. The alvinegros scored first with a gol from Luizinho in 10th minute. Palmeiras, which were playing with blue shirts, equalized the score with a Nei goal in the 52nd minute. However, Corinthians managed to hold Palmeiras to a 1–1 draw and took the title. After that, however, Corinthians would only win the Campeonato Paulista again 22 years later, in 1977.

The derby played at the Morumbi Stadium on April 25, 1971, for Campeonato Paulista, was considered one of the greatest and most exciting chapters in the history of the Dérbi Paulista. Corinthians, which were harshly criticized due to their long time without winning any title and their poor start in the championship, were up against a strong Palmeiras side, with Leão, Luís Pereira, Dudu and Ademir da Guia. With two goals from César Maluco, the alviverdes were leading 2–0 at the half-time. In the second half, however, Corinthians came back stronger, tying the game in the 69th minute, but only one minute later, Leivinha put Palmeiras ahead once again. However, Tião equalized for Corinthians again in the 72nd minute and in the 87th, Mirandinha scored a late winning goal for the alvinegros, in a historic 4–3 win for Corinthians in the derby.

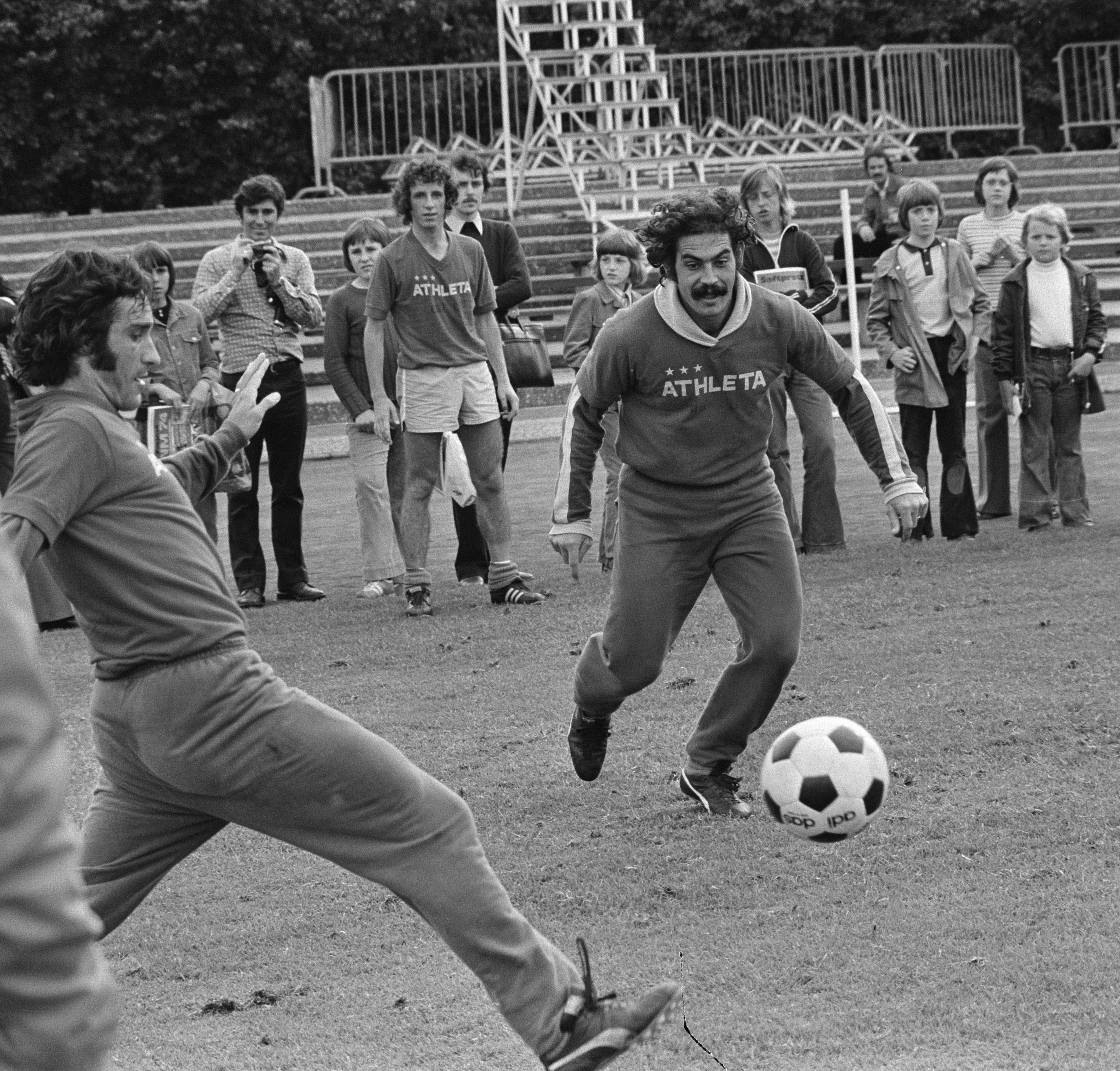
Rivellino, one of Corinthians' greatest players

In the finals of the 1974 Campeonato Paulista, Palmeiras took revenge for the 1954 championship in a quite painful manner for the Corinthians' fans. The alvinegros had not won a Campeonato Paulista in 20 years, and were now comprising players like Rivellino, Vaguinho and Zé Maria, and also the overwhelming majority of the 120,522 fans that were at the Morumbi in the second leg. However, it was the alviverdes, coached by Osvaldo Brandão, who took the title. With a goal by Ronaldo, in the 69th minute, the Verdão won the derby and its 17th state title. At the end of the match, the supporters of Palmeiras at the stadium started chanting "It's 21", mocking their rivals for their 20 years streak without winning any trophy, which after those finals, extended to 21.

In the 1979 Campeonato Paulista, Palmeiras was led by coach Telê Santana and were appointed as the favorites to win the championship, sp due to the good campaign in the first phase. A backstage maneuver by then-president of Corinthians, Vicente Matheus, changed the date of the Dérbi in the semifinal to January 1980. During the first phase of the championship, he used a right that ended up interrupting the championship for 4 months. The Corinthians president refused to play the match against Ponte Preta, in the first phase, as a rodada dupla (double round) was scheduled, and Matheus said that Corinthians would end up harmed in the revenue division (as happened in 1977 and 1978, in which, according to the rules of the championship, the revenue obtained by the clubs was also considered alongside their points in the two previous rounds, in the classification criteria). In fact, there was no rodada dupla and the championship was paralyzed, making the intervention a strategy for Corinthians in order to cool down their rivals' momentum. It worked, as Palmeiras conceded a 1–1 draw to the alvinegros in the 85th minute of the first match. In the second leg, played on January 30, Biro-Biro scored the winning goal for Corinthians with his shin, thus eliminating Palmeiras and paving the way to Timão's title in that year.

== The Derby in the 1980s and 1990s ==
In 1982, during Palmeiras' long streak without winning any titles and the height of the Corinthians Democracy, the alvinegros defeated their rivals by the largest goal different in their history in the fixture. In a Campeonato Paulista match, Corinthians won the derby 5–1, with three goals by the then newcomer Casagrande, one from the midfielder Sócrates and another from Biro-Biro. With a high technical level team, the alvinegro kept up well in the competition and reached the title after defeating São Paulo in the finals. The Verdão finished the championship in third place.

In the 1983 Campeonato Paulista, Palmeiras and Corinthians faced each in the semifinals again. In the first match endend 1–1 and the highlight was how Sócrates was heavily marked by Palmeiras players. In charge of this task, the defender Márcio Alcântara did not detach from him at any moment, however, Corinthians was able to tie the score at the 31st minute of the second half, as Sócrates scored from the penalty spot. In the second match, also played at the Morumbi Stadium, Palmeiras repeated the tactic of trying to stop the midfielder, but this time, the player managed to move more easily and scored the winning goal for Timão. Corinthians advanced to the finals once again, in which they won their second consecutive championship title, after beating São Paulo once more.

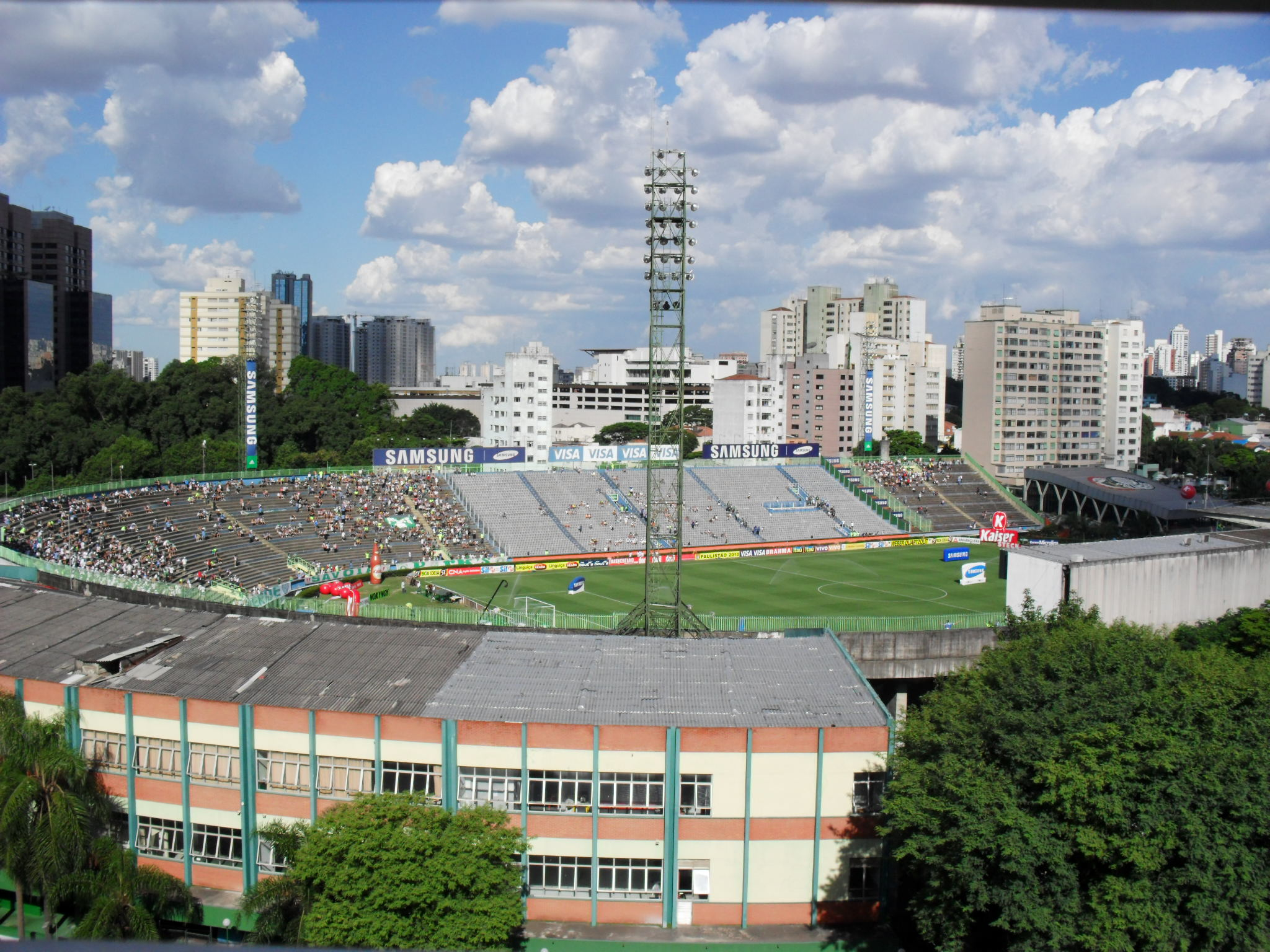
Estadio Palestra Italia, the old Palmeiras' stadium

In 1986, despite still remaining without titles, Palmeiras had two great wins in the derby, both in the Campeonato Paulista. The first one was a 5–1 win in the second phase of the championship, paying back for their defeat in the derby by the same result four years before. Later on, the Dérbi Paulista took place, once again, in the semifinals of Paulistão. Corinthians won the first leg 1–0, with a goal by Cristóvão, and the highlight of the game were the numerous refereeing errors. The alviverdes came back stronger in the second leg, winning 3–0 win, with a great display by striker Mirandinha, who scored Palmeiras' first gol in the 87th minute, and the second one, in overtime. The third was an Olympic goal by Éder, making Palmeiras advance to the finals, in which they ended up being defeated by Inter de Limeira.

In the last round of the 1989 Campeonato Brasileiro second stage, Palmeiras needed a win to advance to the finals of the competition. Their opponent would be Corinthians, which were already eliminated, but did a tough game against their rivals on December 10, 1989. Timão ended up winning 1–0, with a goal from striker Cláudio Adão, scored with his heel, preventing the alviverdes from making to the finals against São Paulo, and extending their streak without trophies.

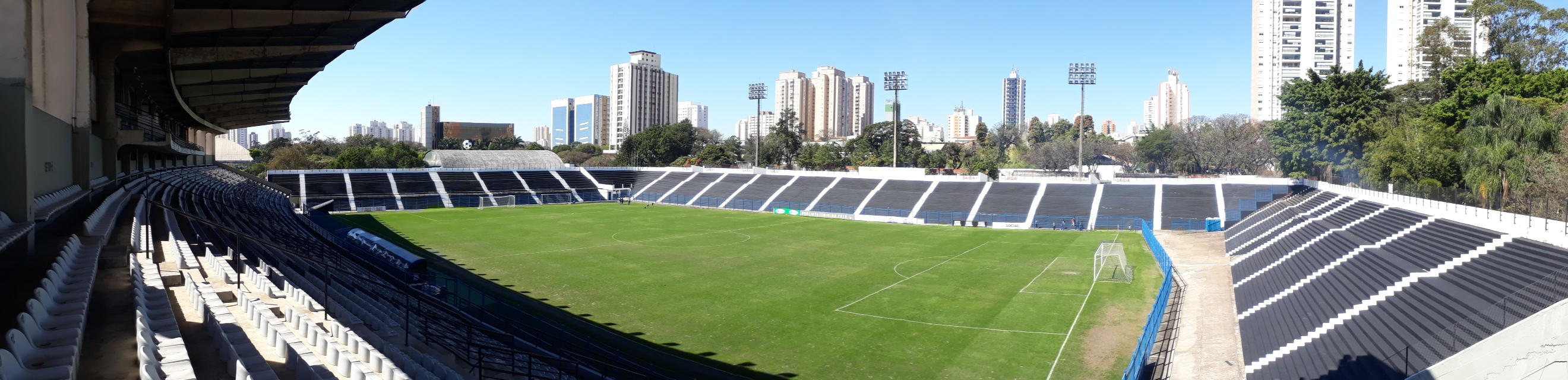
Estádio Alfredo Schürig, commonly known as Estádio Parque São Jorge, or Fazendinha, is a stadium owned by Corinthians.

On June 12, 1993, Corinthians and Palmeiras made another decisive match that involved a lengthy title drought, this time for Palmeiras, which ended this long negative streak commanded by coach Vanderlei Luxemburgo. According to the rules of the Campeonato Paulista of that year, Palmeiras, who had the best campaign in the first phase, needed to win the second leg of the final in order to take the match to extra time. That is because Corinthians won the first game 1–0, with a goal from Viola, who celebrated imitating a pig, their rivals' mascot, provoking the opposing crowd and players. In the second leg, Palmeiras opened the scoring in the first half with midfielder Zinho. In the second half, Mazinho played on the left and crossed to Evair, who made it 2–0, and soon after, Edílson managed to score the third for the alviverdes. With this score, in extra time, Palmeiras could clinch the championship by simply maintaining that current result, but Evair scored the fourth from the penalty spot to put an end to Palmeiras' 17 years streak without winning titles.

Also in 1993, in the Torneio Rio-São Paulo, Palmeiras won another final against Corinthians. In the first leg, Edmundo scored twice and secured Palmeiras' win at Pacaembu, by 2–0. This result ended up deciding the finals, as the second leg ended 0–0, making the Verdão win its 5th Rio-São Paulo title.

== Série A and Copa Libertadores decisive matches ==
At the end of 1994, Palmeiras and Corinthians made yet another decision, this time the most important of the national derby. The teams from São Paulo reached the final of the Campeonato Brasileiro Série A 1994 that year in two games that were played at the Pacaembu Stadium. In the first match, played on December 15, Alviverde defeated Alvinegro 3–1, with a great display by midfielder Rivaldo, who scored two of the three goals from Palmeiras. With the opening of a great advantage over the archrival, Palmeiras entered quietly in the second match and won their eighth title of the Brazilian League on December 18 with a 1–1 draw against Corinthians.

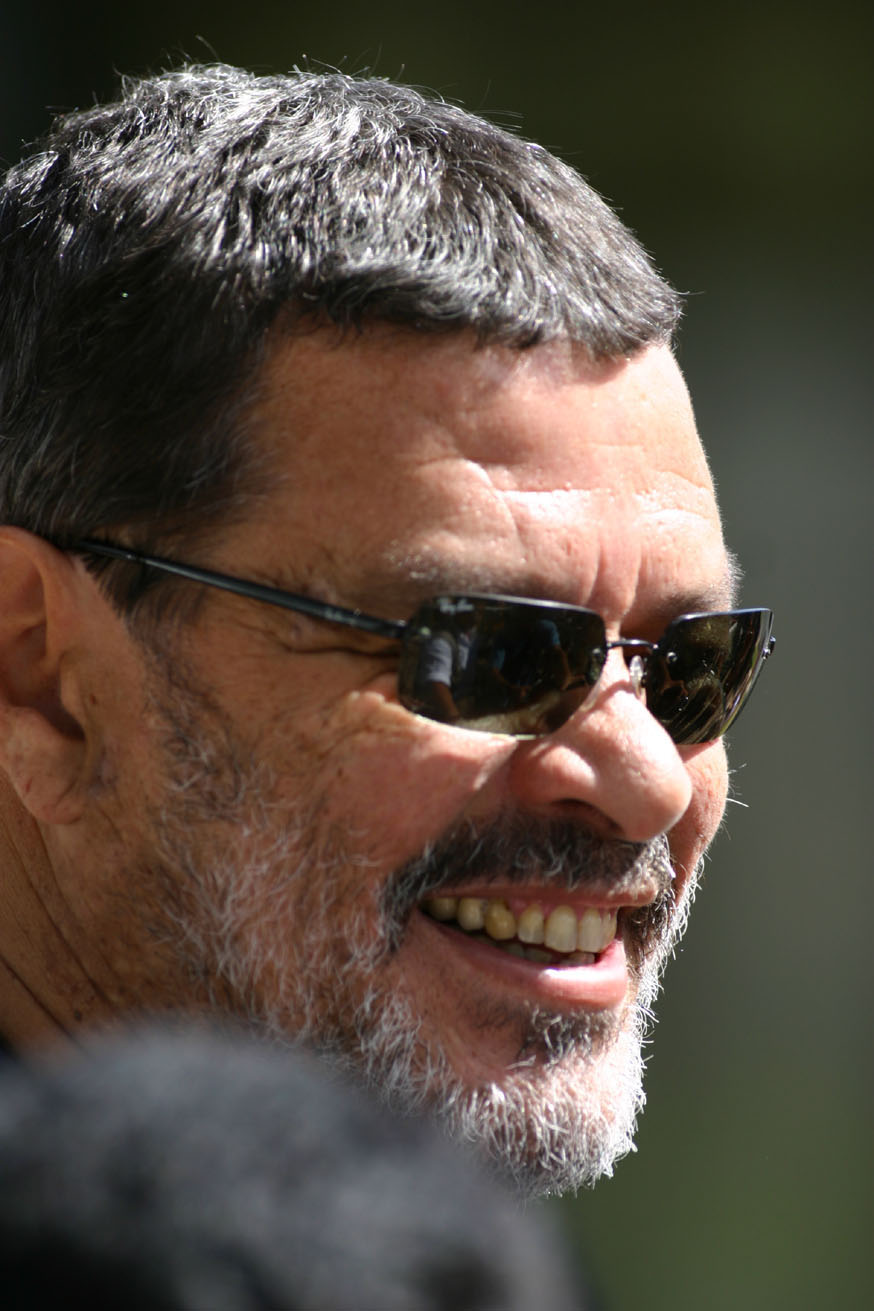
Sócrates, the big name of Corinthians

In 1995 Corinthians returned to give back at Palmeiras in a decision, after failures in the previous two years. The teams reached the finals of the Paulista Championship that year, and the two decisive matches were played in Ribeirão Preto, at the Santa Cruz Stadium. The first game ended with a 1–1 draw, with Palmeiras reaching equality in the 48th minute of the second half with a goal from forward Nílson. In the second match, the same Nílson opened the scoring for alviverde, but midfielder Marcelinho Carioca drew in a beautiful free kick. In overtime, midfielder Elivelton defined the score from 2 to 1 and sealed the title of Corinthians Paulista who, for the first time in his history, leaves the field with a victory in an official title decision against Palmeiras.

In the quarterfinals of the Copa Libertadores 1999, Palmeiras eliminated the archrival. Both matches were held at the Morumbi Stadium and ended with a score of 2: 0: in the first, on May 5, the victory came from Palmeiras, after a real bombing by Corinthians to goal alviverde, but with great performance by the goalkeeper Marcos, who came to be called "São Marcos" by the fans; in the second match, on May 12, Corinthians won. With that, the decision went to penalties, with the green and white team winning 4–2, with another great performance by Marcos, who saw Corinthians striker Dinei kick on the crossbar and who defended one of the penalties of the dispute, charged by the half Vampeta. A month after the confrontation at Libertadores, Palmeiras and Corinthians returned to a decision, now, in the 1999 Campeonato Paulista final. In the first game, played on June 13, alviverde spared the titleholders, as he would have, three days later, the decision against Colombia's Deportivo Cali for the Copa Libertadores final. The alvinegro took advantage of the situation and won the match by 3 to 0. In the second game, played on June 20, days after Palmeiras won the Libertadores, the rivalry, which is historically immense, was on edge. Marcelinho Carioca opened the scoring, but Evair, with two goals, turned the game, tied by Edílson, in the 28th minute of the second half. With the title practically guaranteed, Edílson provoked the Palmeiras team by making "embassies" and juggling the ball. Winger Júnior and striker Paulo Nunes did not like the provocation and went for the Corinthians, triggering a general fight on the field. Judge Paulo César de Oliveira ended the match before normal time and Corinthians was again champion of São Paulo.

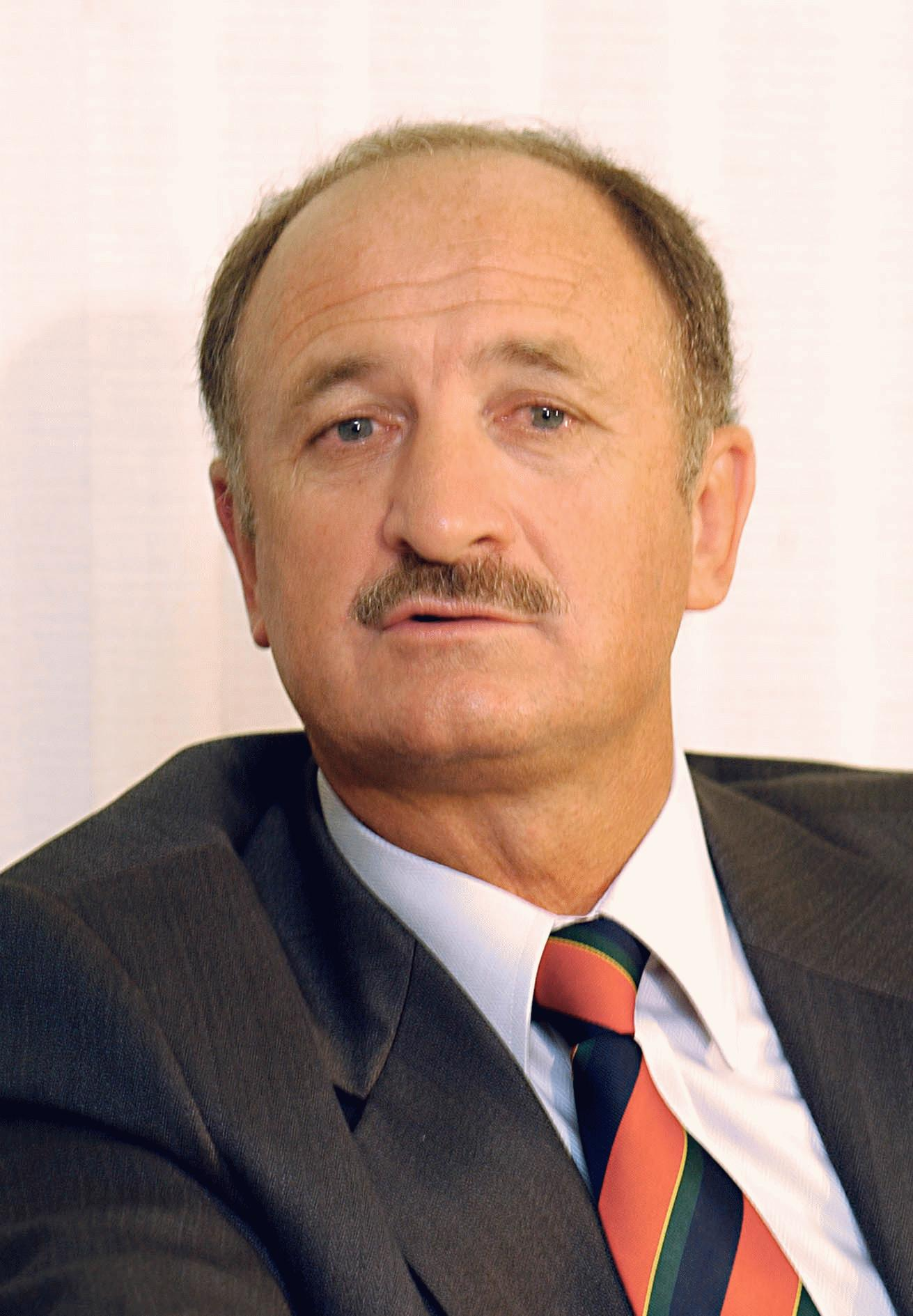
Luiz Felipe Scolari trained Palmeiras in two moments.

In the following year, the two great rivals would return to meet in the Copa Libertadores 2000, only in the semifinal phase. The duel, won again on penalties by Palmeiras, also brought as ingredients the fact that he defended the 1999 continental title and Corinthians won, in the beginning of 2000, the first FIFA Club World Championship Championship. The new clashes, which took place at the Morumbi Stadium, were also seen as a form of Corinthians rematch over their arch rivals, in relation to the knockout stage of the previous year. In the first match of the 2000 Libertadores semifinals, Corinthians beat Palmeiras 4–3. After opening the scoring with a goal by midfielder Ricardinho and allowing the team to tie the game in 3 to 3, alvinegro decided the game in the final minutes, with a goal from the wheel Vampeta. The decisive match, played on June 6, had high doses of emotion, since it had two turns of score. Palmeiras opened the scoring with a goal by striker Euller. Corinthians reached the first turn with two goals from Luizão. Palmeiras turned the game again and set the score at 3–2, with goals from Alex and Galeano. With the equality of goal difference, the classification for the next phase between the two teams was, for the second consecutive year, defined in the penalty kicks. Palmeiras eliminated Corinthians, as they converted the five free kicks, while the opponent wasted the last indirect free kick, after goalkeeper Marcos defended the collection of Corinthians idol Marcelinho Carioca, in one of the most striking moments in the history of the competition and the São Paulo derby .

== The São Paulo derby today ==
In 2011, Palmeiras and Corinthians played a very tense game in the semifinals of the Paulista Championship. With controversial arbitration by judge Paulo César de Oliveira, alviverde played most of the match with one player less, as defender Danilo was sent off for a violent cart over the forward Corinthians Liédson. Despite the adversity and also the expulsion of coach Luis Felipe Scolari, Palmeiras dominated the match and scored the first goal, in the 7th minute of the second half, with defender Leandro Amaro. Corinthians, in turn, tied the game on 19 minutes, with a goal by striker William. The dispute was in a single game and, as it ended in a draw, the decision went to penalties. In the collections, Corinthians goalkeeper Júlio César defended the sixth collection, from the player from the city of João Vítor, and the Peruvian Ramirez hit the free kick, classifying the team in the championship finals and breaking a Corinthians taboo, who had never eliminated the archrival through penalty kicks.

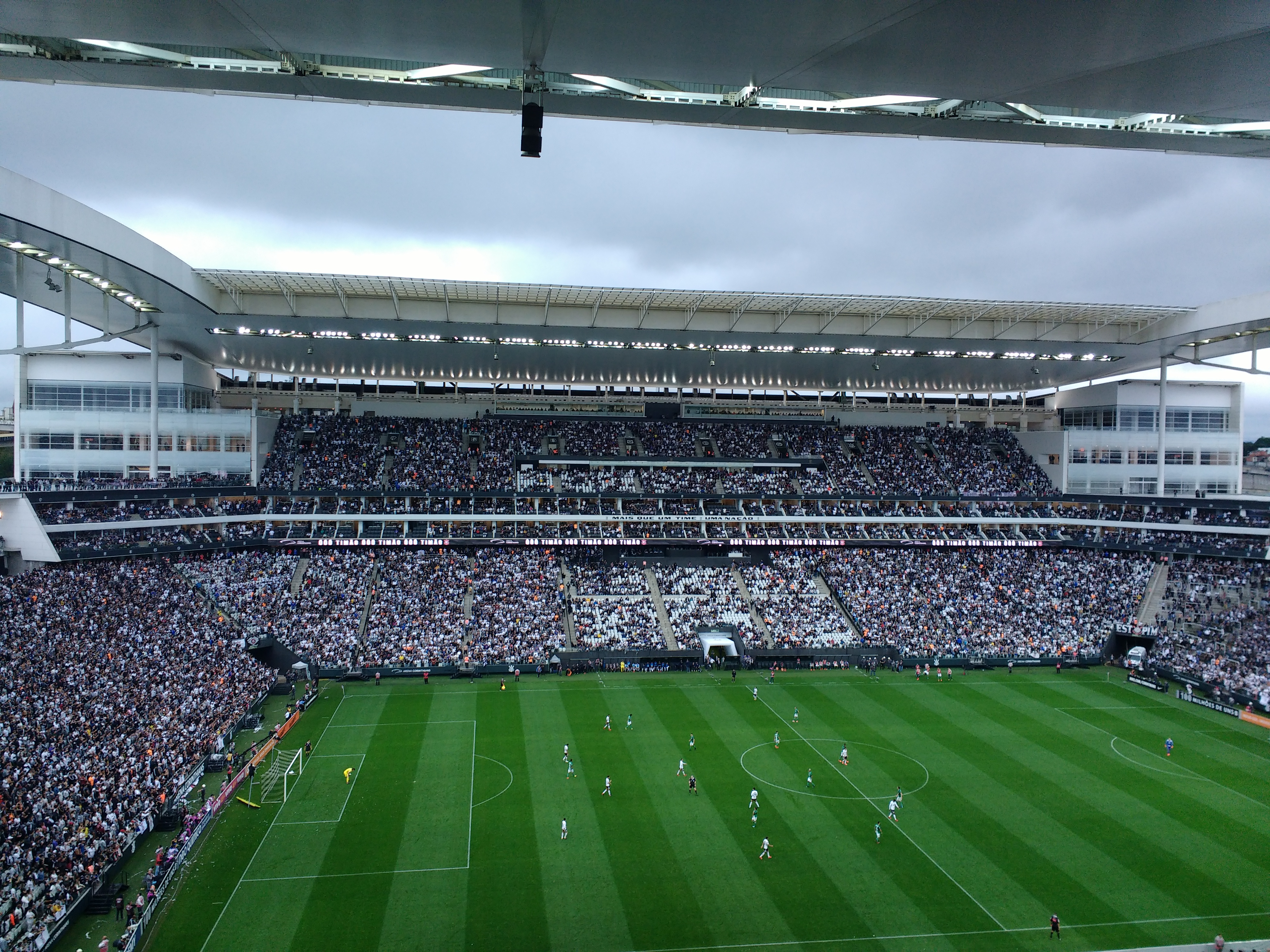
The Derby in 2017

In the same year, in December, the archrivals met again in a decisive game. Palmeiras had no chance of winning a title and was already qualified for the 2012 Copa Sudamericana, but Corinthians was playing the game that could bring their fifth conquest of the Brazilian Championship, played in the system of running points. The alvinegra team was the leader of the competition and needed only a tie to get the title, while Vasco, placed second in the table, needed to root for Palmeiras' victory and defeat their arch rival Flamengo at Estádio Nilton Santos to be champion. At Estádio do Pacaembu, Corinthians and Palmeiras played a tense game, with two expulsions on each side, but without goals, while Vasco and Flamengo drew 1–1 in Rio de Janeiro. At the end of both games, Corinthians won the 2011 Brazilian Championship. Palmeiras ranked eleventh in the championship. Vasco, in turn, took the vice-championship and Flamengo was in the fourth position of the table.

In 2014, on July 27, Corinthians and Palmeiras faced each other again, this time at the new stadium of the Alvinegro, Arena Corinthians, for the first round of the Brazilian Championship. With goals from Paolo Guerrero and Petros, the home team defeated the team alviverde by 2 to 0 in the first Derby Paulista played in the arena.

The following year, on February 8, 2015, it was Derby's turn to be held at Allianz Parque, a new Palmeiras arena, built where the former Palestra Itália Stadium was. In the week leading up to the duel for the first phase of the 2015 Campeonato Paulista, due to the fear of violence among rival organized fans, the Public Ministry tried to impose its will to play the game with the only home crowd, a wish that was also of the president. from Palmeiras, Paulo Nobre, but who did not have the support of the fans of both teams. After the president of Corinthians, Mario Gobbi, threatened not to play the match, the São Paulo Football Federation went back and allocated the load of tickets to the alvinegro. In the game, unlike Corinthians, alviverde failed to win the first Derby in the remodeled arena. He lost 1–0, with a goal by midfielder Danilo, in a match also marked by the expulsion of goalkeeper Cássio Ramos, from Corinthians, by wax. Palmeirense revenge came months later, in the same Paulista Championship, for the semifinal of the competition. In a match played at Arena Corinthians on April 19, 2015, the teams drew in normal time by the score of 2 to 2: Palmeiras came out ahead with a goal from Victor Ramos, took the turn with goals from Danilo and Mendoza, but drew with Rafael Marques. The championship regulations provided for a single game at the home of the team with the best campaign, the unbeaten white-black. But, if there was a tie, the decision would go to penalties. In the charges, striker alviverde Robinho kicked the ball out, but Elias and Petros, from Corinthians, had the charges saved by goalkeeper Fernando Prass. The victory of the visiting team on penalties by 6 to 5, in the middle of the arena in Itaquera, represented the first elimination of Corinthians in their new home in an official competition, precisely for the historic archrival, who qualified for the final of the competition, against Santos.

A little more than a month after eliminating Corinthians in the Paulista Championship, Palmeiras got the better of their rivals, this time with a victory in normal time, at Corinthians Arena, by 2 to 0, for the first round of the 2015 Brazilian Championship. It was alviverde's first victory at the home of Alvinegra and the first defeat of Corinthians in classics in their arena. The match, which was played on May 31 and had goals scored by Rafael Marques and Zé Roberto, also made Palmeiras break a fast of victories over the archrival that lasted since August 2011. 2015 was an important year to reinvigorate rivalry and, in the second round of the Brazilian Championship, it was no different than what was seen in the first half. On September 6, in a match played at Allianz Parque, Palmeiras and Corinthians made a classic defined by the press as “electrifying”. In the game, alviverde came out in front of the marker with a goal scored by Lucas, in the 18th minute of the first half, but the alvinegro drew in the 24th, with Guilherme Arana. In the sequence, at 26, Palmeiras returned to tie with a goal scored by midfielder Robinho. Corinthians arrived at 2 to 2, at 37, with a goal against the midfielder alviverde Amaral, but the arch-rival made 3 to 2 still, in the first half, at 41, with a goal scored by Dudu. In the final stage, alvinegro started a draw after 33 minutes, setting the score in 3 to 3, in one of the best games of the 2015 Brasileirão.

Palmeiras' first victory at Allianz Parque over the biggest rival happened on June 12, 2016, when they defeated Corinthians 1–0 in a game valid for the 2016 Brazilian Championship. The goal of the game was scored at 2 minutes of the second half by midfielder Cleiton Xavier. In this Derby Paulista, it was also the first time that the classic was played with a unique crowd. At the time, the palmeirense arena had its public record broken. There were 39,935 payers for an income of R $2,763,659.36. 2017 is the year that marks the centenary of Derby Paulista and counts on the union of teams in promoting the classic, with several marketing actions together. In the first classic of the year, played at Arena Corinthians, alvinegro took the best, defeating alviverde by 1 to 0. The game was marked by an arbitration error by judge Thiago Duarte Peixoto, who expelled midfielder Gabriel by mistake. Corinthians, instead of warning the player alvinegro Maycon in a move with forward Keno, from Palmeiras, at the end of the first half. At a numerical disadvantage, Corinthians was cornered by the rival for most of the second half, but reached the goal of the heroic victory in the 43rd minute of the second half with a goal from striker Jô, leading the crowd to delirium. In the second match that marked the centenary year, Corinthians defeated Palmeiras once again, this time 2–0 and at Allianz Parque, for the first round of the 2017 Brazilian Championship, with goals from Jadson and Guilherme Arana. As in 2016, when Palmeiras had won the three games of the year in the classic, Corinthians closed the treble of victories over the biggest rival in the second round of the Brazilian Championship, in a game played on November 5. With goals from Romero, Balbuena and Jô, the black-and-whites won the derby by 3–2, as Mina and Moisés scored for Porco, in a game that set the record for the most club appearances in the Corinthians Arena.

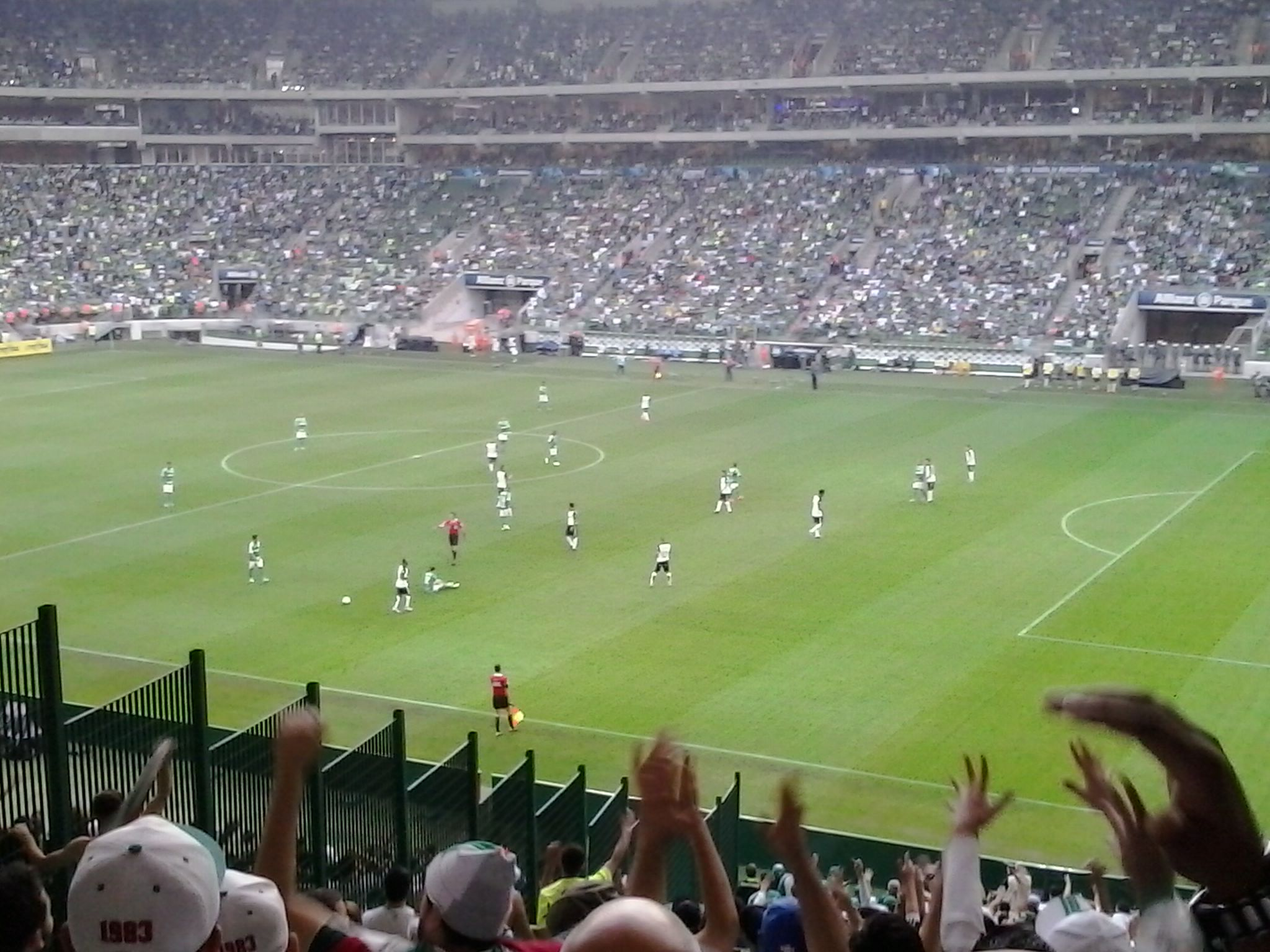
Derby Paulista in 2015, at the Allianz Parque, which ended 3–3

In 2018, after 19 years, Corinthians and Palmeiras decided a championship final again, this time, that of the 2018 Campeonato Paulista. The first leg, at Arena Corinthians, was a highly disputed game, which the alviverdes won 1–0, with a goal by striker Miguel Borja in the 6th minute, breaking a sequence of four consecutive Corinthians wins in the four previous derbies. In the second leg, held at Allianz Parque, Corinthians tied the aggregate score by winning 1–0, and also with an early goal, as Rodriguinho scored in the 2nd minute of the match. With this result, the finals went to penalties and Timão won 4–3, clinching their twenty-ninth Paulistão title, and their first ever trophy at their rivals new stadium. The final at Allianz Parque was also marked by a controversial decision by the referee Marcelo Aparecido Ribeiro de Souza, who canceled a penalty for Palmeiras, at the second half. The game was paralyzed for 8 minutes, with turmoil provoked by players from both teams. After the end of the match, Palmeiras reported the breach with the São Paulo Football Federation, claiming that the referee's decision was changed by external interference, a procedure not authorized by FIFA, and conditioning the end of the breach with the adoption of more transparent practices by the entity in relation to refereeing, such as the implementation of the VAR. The outrage with the referee and the loss of the title to the biggest rival also hit the crowd, as equipment and subway trains at Barra Funda Station, were destroyed by members of "Torcidas Organizadas" of Palmeiras.

In 2020, during the COVID-19 pandemic, Corinthians and Palmeiras met again in the finals of the Campeonato Paulista. Both matches were played behind closed doors, the first time in the history of the championship. The first leg, at the Arena Corinthians ended in a 0–0 draw. In their second encounter, Luiz Adriano scored and put Palmeiras 1–0 at the beginning of the second half, until Corinthians were awarded a penalty in the sixth minute of additional time, which Jô scored to tie the match. With a 1–1 tie on aggregate, the title was decided in a penalty shootout, in which Palmeiras won this time, by 4–3, with Weverton saving two kicks and Patrick de Paula scoring the title winning penalty for the Verdão. Palmeiras won their first state championship in 12 years and also prevented their rivals from winning four Paulistas in a row, a feat never before achieved in São Paulo football.

On January 18, 2021, Palmeiras beat Corinthians 4–0 in the matchweek 28 of the Campeonato Brasileiro, with both Raphael Veiga and Luiz Araújo scoring twice. This result marked the largest win in the Dérbi in the history of the Brazilian Championship, and in the 21st century. With this win, the alviverdes also regained the advantage in the statistics of the fixture, with 129 wins against 128 from their rivals.

On November 4, 2024, during the derby between Corinthians and Palmeiras at Neo Química Arena, Corinthians fans threw a pig's head onto the pitch as a provocation toward their rivals, who are nicknamed "Porco" (Pig). The incident occurred in the first half during a Palmeiras corner kick; striker Yuri Alberto removed the object from the field with a kick, later commenting that he was almost injured after mistaking it for a cushion. Corinthians won the match 2–0, with goals from Rodrigo Garro and Yuri Alberto himself. The result of the match contributed to Palmeiras losing the national championship, later won by Botafogo.

In 2025, both teams faced each other in the finals of the Campeonato Paulista for the eighth time in history. In the first leg, at Allianz Parque, Corinthians won the derby 1–0 with a goal from Yuri Alberto in the 58th minute, with that being their first win at their rivals' stadium since 2019. The second leg was the first time a final between the two was contested at the Neo Química Arena. The alvinegros managed to keep the 0–0 in the score after Hugo Souza saved a penalty from Raphael Veiga in the 73rd minute and Félix Torres being sent off just two minutes after it. The end of the match was tense and chaotic, with a fight between players that resulted in two more red cards after Memphis Depay stood on the ball with both feet in addition to flares being thrown onto the pitch by supporters. In the end, Corinthians won by 1–0 on aggregate and clinched the Campeonato Paulista after 6 years, also preventing the alviverdes from achieving 4 consecutive titles, just as Palmeiras did in 2020. Later in the year, Corinthians eliminated Palmeiras from the Round of 16 of Copa do Brasil, which was the first time ever both teams went against each other on the competition. Corinthians won both games with an aggregated score of 3–0, with the first game being 1–0 at Neo Química Arena with a header goal from Memphis Depay in the 73rd minute. During the second leg on Allianz Parque, Anibal Moreno of Palmeiras received a red card after attacking José Martínez with a headbutt in the 15th minute, helping Corinthians score the first goal in the 43rd minute from Matheus Bidu and Gustavo Henrique scored the second goal with a header in the 59th minute. Later in the competition, Corinthians defeated Vasco da Gama on Maracanã by 2–1 and was crowned champion after sixteen years.

== Statistics ==
=== Head to head results ===
As of 11 October 2026

Competition	Games	Corinthians wins	Draws	Palmeiras wins	Corinthians goals	Palmeiras goals
Paulista Championship (Note: Three derbies were simultaneously valid for the Torneio Rio-São Paulo and for the Campeonato Paulista of that season. Palmeiras won two of them, both in 1933, and Corinthians won one match in 1940. In this table, those matches are only being considered as Torneio Rio-São Paulo games.) (Note: A match won by Corinthians by W.O. in the 1923 Campeonato Paulista is not included in the statistics of the fixture.)	218	79	68	71	290	297
Rio–São Paulo Tournament	29	7	6	16	36	58
Brazilian Championship	74	19	26	29	66	96
Brazil Cup	2	2	0	0	3	0
Torneio dos Campeões	2	0	1	1	1	2
Copa Libertadores	6	3	0	3	10	10
Other competitions and friendly matches	60	23	19	18	97	90
Total	391	133	120	138	503	553

=== Record by stadium ===
Stadium	Games	Corinthians wins	Draws	Palmeiras wins	Corinthians goals	Palmeiras goals
Pacaembu	153	60	47	46	226	219
Morumbi	112	39	34	39	131	139
Palestra Itália	42	11	10	21	45	74
Neo Química Arena	25	9	9	7	23	22
Nubank Parque	17	6	4	7	17	22
Parque São Jorge	14	5	4	5	23	20
Prudentão (Presidente Prudente)	7	0	3	4	9	17
Floresta	6	2	2	2	12	11
Others (Note: 4 matches at the Ponte Grande; 3 at the Arena Barueri (Barueri); 3 at the Estádio Santa Cruz (Ribeirão Preto); 1 at the Fonte Nova (Salvador); 1 at the Estádio Fortaleza (Barretos); 1 at the Estádio Martins Pereira (São José dos Campos); 1 at the Morenão (Campo Grande) and 1 at the Teixeirão (São José do Rio Preto).)	15	1	7	7	17	29
Total	391	133	120	138	503	553

== Records ==
=== Largest wins ===
Winner	Score	Year	Date	Stadium	Competition
Palmeiras	8–0	1933	November 5	Palestra Italia	Campeonato Paulista and Torneio Rio – São Paulo
Palmeiras	6–0	1948	April 25	Pacaembu	Taça Cidade de São Paulo
Palmeiras	5–1	1933	May 7	Parque São Jorge	Campeonato Paulista and Torneio Rio-São Paulo
Corinthians	5–1	1952	August 27	Pacaembu	Taça Cidade de São Paulo
Corinthians	5–1	1982	August 1	Morumbi	Campeonato Paulista
Palmeiras	5–1	1986	August 3	Morumbi	Campeonato Paulista
Palmeiras	4–0	1930	August 24	Palestra Italia	Campeonato Paulista
Palmeiras	4–0	1958	August 21	Pacaembu	Campeonato Paulista
Palmeiras	4–0	1993	June 12	Morumbi	Campeonato Paulista
Palmeiras	4–0	2004	May 2	Morumbi	Campeonato Brasileiro
Palmeiras	4–0	2021	January 18	Allianz Parque	Campeonato Brasileiro

=== Most goals in a single match ===
- 10 goals: Palmeiras 4–6 Corinthians (Campeonato Paulista – 18 January 1953) – Pacaembu Stadium, São Paulo

=== Top goalscorers ===
Player	Club	Goals
(Brazil) Cláudio	Corinthians	21
(Brazil) Baltazar	Corinthians	20
(Brazil) Luizinho	Corinthians	19
(Brazil) Heitor	Palmeiras	16
(Brazil) Teleco	Corinthians	15
(Brazil) César Lemos	Palmeiras	13
(Brazil) Marcelinho Carioca	Corinthians	13
(Brazil) Romeu Pellicciari	Palmeiras	13

=== Most appearances ===
- (Brazil) Ademir da Guia (Palmeiras): 57 matches

=== Longest unbeaten runs ===
Games	Club	Period	Results
12	Palmeiras	4 May 1930 – 5 August 1934	11 wins and 1 draw
10	Corinthians	26 December 1948 – 24 March 1951	7 wins and 3 draws
10	Corinthians	6 July 1952 – 21 July 1954	7 wins and 3 draws
10	Corinthians	22 November 1970 – 4 November 1973	3 wins and 7 draws
10	Corinthians	4 December 2011 – 31 May 2015	5 wins and 5 draws
8	Corinthians	12 August 1956 – 15 March 1958	4 wins and 4 draws
8	Palmeiras	28 September 1997 – 27 February 1999	4 wins and 4 draws
8	Palmeiras	17 March 2022 – 1 July 2024	5 wins and 3 draws

=== Most consecutive wins ===
Games	Club	Period
6	Palmeiras	4 May 1930 – 7 September 1931
5	Palmeiras	15 November 1931 – 5 August 1934
4	Corinthians	26 December 1948 – 14 August 1949
4	Corinthians	27 August 1952 – 8 March 1953
4	Corinthians	22 June 1955 – 15 April 1956
4	Palmeiras	23 February 1963 – 18 April 1964
4	Corinthians	8 December 1983 – 18 August 1985
4	Palmeiras	4 March 2007 – 2 March 2008
4	Corinthians	22 February 2017 – 24 February 2018

=== Largest attendances ===
List of the 10 matches with the largest attendances. All of them were played at Morumbi Stadium.

1. Palmeiras 1–0 Corinthians, 120,522 (12 December 1974)
2. Palmeiras 4–0 Corinthians, 104,401 (12 June 1993)
3. Corinthians 1–0 Palmeiras, 102,939 (31 August 1997)
4. Corinthians 0–2 Palmeiras, 102,187 (16 April 1989)
5. Corinthians 1–0 Palmeiras, 95,784 (8 December 1983)
6. Corinthians 1–0 Palmeiras, 95,759 (24 August 1986)
7. Corinthians 3–0 Palmeiras, 94,872 (11 November 1978)
8. Corinthians 0–0 Palmeiras, 94,852 (18 February 1979)
9. Corinthians 1–0 Palmeiras, 93,736 (6 June 1983)
10. Palmeiras 3–0 Corinthians, 92,982 (27 August 1986)

== Derbies in the Série A ==
=== List of League matches ===
#	Date	Palmeiras	Corinthians	Stadium	Attendance
1	March 9, 1967	2	1	Pacaembu	–
2	May 24, 1967	2	2	Pacaembu	44,593
3	June 4, 1967	1	0	Palestra Itália	40,032
4	November 16, 1968	2	0	Morumbi	17,277
5	November 15, 1969	1	0	Pacaembu	27,763
6	November 30, 1969	1	1	Morumbi	38,022
7	November 22, 1970	1	1	Pacaembu	47,001
8	August 15, 1971	0	0	Morumbi	–
9	November 1, 1972	0	1	Pacaembu	58,563
10	November 18, 1973	2	1	Morumbi	35,850
11	January 27, 1974	0	0	Pacaembu	16,206
12	March 17, 1974	0	0	Pacaembu	31,748
13	September 21, 1975	1	1	Morumbi	45,263
14	November 30, 1975	0	1	Morumbi	–
15	November 7, 1976	0	0	Morumbi	91,293
16	October 25, 1987	0	0	Pacaembu	22,433
17	October 9, 1988	2	0	Morumbi	12,575
18	December 10, 1989	0	1	Morumbi	34,627
19	September 9, 1990	1	2	Morumbi	17,828
20	March 17, 1991	0	0	Morumbi	42,759
21	March 29, 1992	1	2	Morumbi	30,409
22	November 13, 1994	4	1	Morumbi	23,405
23	December 15, 1994	3	1	Pacaembu	36,409
24	December 18, 1994	1	1	Pacaembu	35,277
25	September 17, 1995	2	0	Pacaembu	25,543
26	October 23, 1996	2	2	Morumbi	21,440
27	September 28, 1997	2	2	Morumbi	21,833
28	October 3, 1998	3	1	Morumbi	34,246
29	September 12, 1999	4	1	Morumbi	28,557
30	August 16, 2000	0	1	Morumbi	3,139
31	October 3, 2001	2	4	Morumbi	–
32	October 23, 2002	2	2	Morumbi	40,659
33	May 2, 2004	4	0	Morumbi	28,644
34	August 29, 2004	0	1	Morumbi	35,229
35	July 10, 2005	1	3	Morumbi	39,629
36	October 16, 2005	1	1	Morumbi	34,282
37	July 16, 2006	1	0	Morumbi	15,048
38	October 25, 2006	0	1	Morumbi	16,593
39	June 30, 2007	1	0	Morumbi	28,395
49	September 23, 2007	1	0	Morumbi	16,591
41	July 26, 2009	3	0	Estádio Prudentão	29,977
42	November 1, 2009	2	2	Estádio Prudentão	–
43	August 1, 2010	1	1	Pacaembu	24,491
44	January 31, 2010	0	1	Pacaembu	35,035
45	August 28, 2011	2	1	Estádio Prudentão	36,299
46	December 4, 2011	0	0	Pacaembu	39,928
47	June 24, 2012	1	2	Pacaembu	17,519
48	September 16, 2012	0	2	Pacaembu	26,068
49	July 27, 2014	0	2	Arena Corinthians	31,031
50	October 25, 2014	1	1	Pacaembu	25,550
51	May 31, 2015	2	0	Arena Corinthians	29,479
52	September 6, 2015	3	3	Allianz Parque	35,707
53	June 12, 2016	1	0	Allianz Parque	39,935
54	September 17, 2016	2	0	Arena Corinthians	39,879
55	July 12, 2017	0	2	Allianz Parque	39,091
56	November 5, 2017	2	3	Arena Corinthians	46,090
57	May 13, 2018	0	1	Arena Corinthians	34,967
58	September 9, 2018	1	0	Allianz Parque	38,568
59	August 4, 2019	1	1	Arena Corinthians	43,045
60	November 9, 2019	1	1	Allianz Parque	36,290
61	September 10, 2020	2	0	Arena Corinthians	–
62	January 18, 2021	4	0	Allianz Parque	–
63	June 12, 2021	1	1	Allianz Parque	–
64	September 25, 2021	1	2	Arena Corinthians	–
65	April 23, 2022	3	0	Arena Barueri	23,793
66	August 13, 2022	1	0	Neo Química Arena	44,966
67	April 29, 2023	2	1	Allianz Parque	41,457
68	September 3, 2023	0	0	Neo Química Arena	44,371
69	July 1, 2024	2	0	Allianz Parque	41,175
70	November 4, 2024	0	2	Neo Química Arena	46,473
71	April 12, 2025	2	0	Arena Barueri	19,297
72	August 31, 2025	1	1	Neo Química Arena	44,969
73	April 12, 2026	0	0	Neo Química Arena	46,466
74	October 11, 2026	4	1	Nubank Parque	30,112

=== Doing the double in the Série A ===
Since 2003, when the Campeonato Brasileiro adopted the round-robin system, one of the teams has defeated their rivals in both matches 6 times. The result on the right refers to the first match and the result on the left, to the second game.

Season	Team	Results	
2007	Palmeiras	1–0	1–0
2012	Corinthians	2–1	2–0
2016	Palmeiras	1–0	2–0
2017	Corinthians	2–0	3–2
2020	Palmeiras	2–0	4–0
2022	Palmeiras	3–0	1–0

=== Head-to-head ranking (2003–present) ===
P.	03	04	05	06	07	08	09	10	11	12	13	14	15	16	17	18	19	20	21	22	23	24	25
1			1						1				1	1	1	1				1	1		
2															2							2	2
3								3									3		3				
4		4	4			4						4								4			
5		5					5												5				
6										6													
7					7									7				7				7	
8																	8						
9				9									9										
10							10	10			10												
11									11														
12																		12					
13																13					13		13
14																							
15	15																						
16				16								16											
17					17																		
18										18													
19																							
20																							
21																							
22																							
23																							
24																							
Série B
1	1					1					1												

• Total: Palmeiras 13 times higher, Corinthians 10 times higher.

== Major finals between the clubs ==
Season	Competition	Date	Match	Score	Winner
1936	Campeonato Paulista	25 April 1937	PAL – COR	1–0	Palmeiras
1936	Campeonato Paulista	2 May 1937	COR – PAL	0–0	Palmeiras
1936	Campeonato Paulista	9 May 1937	PAL – COR	2–1	Palmeiras
1951	Torneio Rio-São Paulo	8 April 1951	PAL – COR	3–2	Palmeiras
1951	Torneio Rio-São Paulo	11 April 1951	COR – PAL	1–3	Palmeiras
1974	Campeonato Paulista	18 December 1974	COR – PAL	1–1	Palmeiras
1974	Campeonato Paulista	22 December 1974	PAL – COR	1–0	Palmeiras
1993	Campeonato Paulista	6 June 1993	COR – PAL	1–0	Palmeiras
1993	Campeonato Paulista	12 June 1993	PAL – COR	4–0 (a.e.t.)	Palmeiras
1993	Torneio Rio-São Paulo	4 August 1993	PAL – COR	2–0	Palmeiras
1993	Torneio Rio-São Paulo	7 August 1993	COR – PAL	0–0	Palmeiras
1994	Brazilian Série A	15 December 1994	PAL – COR	3–1	Palmeiras
1994	Brazilian Série A	18 December 1994	COR – PAL	1–1	Palmeiras
1995	Campeonato Paulista	30 July 1995	PAL – COR	1–1	Corinthians
1995	Campeonato Paulista	6 August 1995	COR – PAL	2–1 (a.e.t.)	Corinthians
1999	Campeonato Paulista	13 June 1999	COR – PAL	3–0	Corinthians
1999	Campeonato Paulista	20 June 1999	PAL – COR	2–2	Corinthians
2018	Campeonato Paulista	31 March 2018	COR – PAL	0–1	Corinthians
2018	Campeonato Paulista	8 April 2018	PAL – COR	0–1 (3–4 p)	Corinthians
2020	Campeonato Paulista	5 August 2020	COR – PAL	0–0	Palmeiras
2020	Campeonato Paulista	8 August 2020	PAL – COR	1–1 (4–3 p)	Palmeiras
2025	Campeonato Paulista	16 March 2025	PAL – COR	0–1	Corinthians
2025	Campeonato Paulista	27 March 2025	COR – PAL	0–0	Corinthians

- Finals won: Palmeiras 7, Corinthians 4.

== Honours ==
Competition	Corinthians		Palmeiras	
Competition	Titles	Years	Titles	Years
Brazilian Championship	7	1990, 1998, 1999, 2005, 2011, 2015, 2017	12	1960^{TB}, 1967^{RGP}, 1967^{TB}, 1969^{RGP}, 1972, 1973, 1993, 1994, 2016, 2018, 2022, 2023
Brazil Cup	4	1995, 2002, 2009, 2025	4	1998, 2012, 2015, 2020
Brazil Supercup	2	1991, 2026	1	2023
Brazilian Champions Cup	0		1	2000
Copa Libertadores	1	2012	3	1999, 2020, 2021
Copa Mercosur	0		1	1998
Recopa Sudamericana	1	2013	1	2022
Copa Rio Intercontinental	0		1	1951
FIFA Club World Cup	2	2000, 2012	0	
Total	17		24	
Rio–São Paulo Tournament	5	1950, 1953, 1954, 1966^{s}, 2002	5	1933, 1951, 1965, 1993, 2000
São Paulo State Championship	31	1914, 1916, 1922, 1923, 1924, 1928, 1929, 1930, 1937, 1938, 1939, 1941, 1951, 1952, 1954, 1977, 1979, 1982, 1983, 1988, 1995, 1997, 1999, 2001, 2003, 2009, 2013, 2017, 2018, 2019, 2025	27	1920, 1926, 1927, 1932, 1933, 1934, 1936, 1940, 1942, 1944, 1947, 1950, 1959, 1963, 1966, 1972, 1974, 1976, 1993, 1994, 1996, 2008, 2020, 2022, 2023, 2024, 2026
Total general	53		56	

Notes

- ^{s} = shared title
- ^{TB} = Taça Brasil (1959–1968), recognized by CBF as Brazilian national championships on December 2010.
- ^{RGP} = Torneio Roberto Gomes Pedrosa (1967–1970), recognized by CBF as Brazilian national championships on December 2010.

== Sources ==
- Classic is Classic... and Vice-Versa
- Stories of Derby Paulista
- Futpédia
