= 1949 São Paulo FC season =

São Paulo
1949 season
- Chairman: Paulo Machado de Carvalho; Cícero Pompeu de Toledo
- Manager: Vicente Feola
- Campeonato Paulista: Champions

The 1949 football season was São Paulo's 20th season since the club's founding in 1930.

== Overall ==
Games played	44 (22 Campeonato Paulista, 22 Friendly match)
Games won	30 (16 Campeonato Paulista, 14 Friendly match)
Games drawn	6 (4 Campeonato Paulista, 2 Friendly match)
Games lost	8 (2 Campeonato Paulista, 6 Friendly match)
Goals scored	129
Goals conceded	54
Goal difference	+75
Best result	8–0 (A) v São Paulo (Araçatuba) - Friendly match - 1949.02.13
Worst result	0–3 (A) v Prudentina - Friendly match - 1949.05.08
Most appearances	
Top scorer	

Source: São Paulo FC

== Friendlies ==
January 6 Taça R. Monteiro	Portuguesa	1–3	São Paulo	São Paulo
	Goal		Goal	Stadium: Estádio Paulo Machado de Carvalho (Pacaembu)

January 16 National	Hepacaré	1–5	São Paulo	Lorena
	Goal		Goal	Stadium: Estádio General Affonseca

January 23 Taça R. Monteiro	São Paulo	3–2	Fluminense	São Paulo
	Goal		Goal	Stadium: Estádio Paulo Machado de Carvalho (Pacaembu)

January 30 Taça dos Campeões RJ-SP	São Paulo	2–1	Botafogo	São Paulo
	Goal		Goal	Stadium: Estádio Paulo Machado de Carvalho (Pacaembu)

February 5 Taça R. Monteiro	Palmeiras	1–2	São Paulo	São Paulo
	Goal		Goal	Stadium: Estádio Paulo Machado de Carvalho (Pacaembu)

February 13 Taça Filhos de Araçatuba	São Paulo (Araçatuba)	0–8	São Paulo	Araçatuba
			Goal	Stadium: Estádio Paulo Machado de Carvalho (Pacaembu)

February 20 National	Ponte Preta	3–2	São Paulo	Campinas
	Goal		Goal	Stadium: Estádio Moisés Lucarelli

April 3 National	Elvira	2–6	São Paulo	Jacareí
	Goal		Goal

April 24 National	Velo Clube Rioclarense	0–1	São Paulo	Rio Claro
			Goal	Stadium: Campo do Rio Claro

May 1 National	São Joaquim	1–4	São Paulo	São Joaquim da Barra
	Goal		Goal

May 3 National	Palmeiras (Franca)	0–3	São Paulo	Franca
			Goal

May 8 National	Prudentina	3–0	São Paulo	Presidente Prudente
	Goal

May 15 National	XV de Piracicaba	4–3	São Paulo	Piracicaba
	Goal		Goal

May 21 Taça Cidade de São Paulo	São Paulo	1–1	Ypiranga	São Paulo
	Goal		Goal	Stadium: Estádio Paulo Machado de Carvalho (Pacaembu)

May 25 Taça Cidade de São Paulo	Santos	2–0	São Paulo	São Paulo
	Goal			Stadium: Estádio Paulo Machado de Carvalho (Pacaembu)

June 1 National	São Paulo	2–1	Vasco da Gama	São Paulo
	Goal		Goal	Stadium: Estádio Paulo Machado de Carvalho (Pacaembu)

June 4 International	São Paulo (Brazil)	1–0	(England) Arsenal	São Paulo
	Goal			Stadium: Estádio Paulo Machado de Carvalho (Pacaembu)

June 29 International	São Paulo (Brazil)	2–4	(Austria) Rapid Wien	São Paulo
	Goal		Goal	Stadium: Estádio Paulo Machado de Carvalho (Pacaembu)

September 1 Taça Cícero Pompeu de Toledo	Noroeste	1–2	São Paulo	Bauru
	Goal		Goal

October 9 Taça Cor. Wilson	Coritiba	0–3	São Paulo	Curitiba
			Goal

November 26 Malmö Cup	São Paulo (Brazil)	6–0	(Sweden) Malmö	São Paulo
	Goal			Stadium: Estádio Paulo Machado de Carvalho (Pacaembu)

December 4 National	Rio Preto	0–0	São Paulo	São José do Rio Preto
				Stadium: Estádio Vitor Britto Bastos

December 8 National	São Paulo	2–4	Fluminense	São Paulo
	Goal		Goal	Stadium: Estádio Paulo Machado de Carvalho (Pacaembu)

== Official competitions ==
=== Campeonato Paulista ===
June 12 1	São Paulo	2–0	XV de Piracicaba	São Paulo
	Goal			Stadium: Estádio Paulo Machado de Carvalho (Pacaembu)

June 25 2	São Paulo	1–0	Nacional	São Paulo
	Goal			Stadium: Estádio Paulo Machado de Carvalho (Pacaembu)

July 3 3	São Paulo	7–2	Comercial	São Paulo
	Goal		Goal	Stadium: Estádio Paulo Machado de Carvalho (Pacaembu)

July 10 4	São Paulo	0–0	Portuguesa	São Paulo
				Stadium: Estádio Paulo Machado de Carvalho (Pacaembu)

July 17 5	Jabaquara	1–4	São Paulo	Santos
	Goal		Goal	Stadium: Estádio Ulrico Mursa

July 24 6	São Paulo	5–1	Palmeiras	São Paulo
	Goal		Goal	Stadium: Estádio Paulo Machado de Carvalho (Pacaembu)

July 30 7	São Paulo	3–1	Portuguesa Santista	São Paulo
	Goal		Goal	Stadium: Estádio Paulo Machado de Carvalho (Pacaembu)

August 7 8	São Paulo	8–2	Juventus	São Paulo
	Goal		Goal	Stadium: Estádio Paulo Machado de Carvalho (Pacaembu)

August 14 9	Santos	1–0	São Paulo	Santos
	Goal			Stadium: Estádio Urbano Caldeira (Vila Belmiro)

August 21 10	São Paulo	5–1	Ypiranga	São Paulo
	Goal		Goal	Stadium: Estádio Paulo Machado de Carvalho (Pacaembu)

August 28 11	São Paulo	3–2	Corinthians	São Paulo
	Goal		Goal	Stadium: Estádio Paulo Machado de Carvalho (Pacaembu)

September 10 12	São Paulo	4–0	Jabaquara	São Paulo
	Goal			Stadium: Estádio Paulo Machado de Carvalho (Pacaembu)

September 18 13	São Paulo	5–1	Ypiranga	São Paulo
	Goal		Goal	Stadium: Estádio Paulo Machado de Carvalho (Pacaembu)

September 25 14	XV de Piracicaba	2–0	São Paulo	Piracicaba
	Goal			Stadium: Campo da Rua Regente Feijó

October 2 15	São Paulo	4–0	Comercial	São Paulo
	Goal			Stadium: Estádio Paulo Machado de Carvalho (Pacaembu)

October 16 16	Portuguesa Santista	2–2	São Paulo	Santos
	Goal		Goal	Stadium: Estádio Ulrico Mursa

October 23 17	Palmeiras	2–4	São Paulo	São Paulo
	Goal		Goal	Stadium: Estádio Paulo Machado de Carvalho (Pacaembu)

November 1 18	São Paulo	5–0	Nacional	São Paulo
	Goal			Stadium: Estádio Paulo Machado de Carvalho (Pacaembu)

November 6 19	São Paulo	1–1	Portuguesa	São Paulo
	Goal		Goal	Stadium: Estádio Paulo Machado de Carvalho (Pacaembu)

November 12 20	Juventus	0–1	São Paulo	São Paulo
			Goal	Stadium: Estádio Conde Rodolfo Crespi (Rua Javari)

November 20 21	São Paulo	3–1	Santos	São Paulo
	Goal		Goal	Stadium: Estádio Paulo Machado de Carvalho (Pacaembu)

December 11 22	São Paulo	3–3	Corinthians	São Paulo
	Goal		Goal	Stadium: Estádio Paulo Machado de Carvalho (Pacaembu)

==== Record ====
Final Position	Points	Matches	Wins	Draws	Losses	Goals For	Goals Away	Win%
1st	36	22	16	4	2	70	23	90%
