= Vanderlei Luxemburgo =

Brazilian footballer and manager

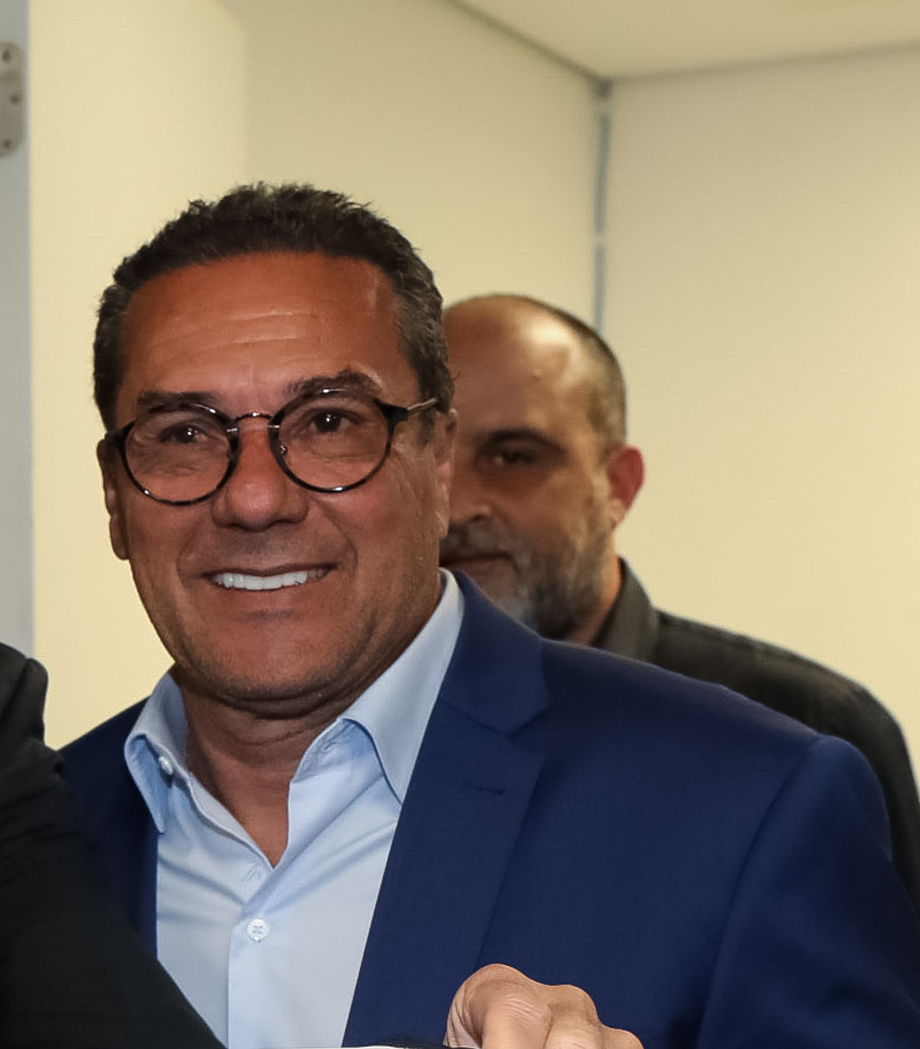
- Luxemburgo in 2019

Personal information
- Full name: Vanderlei Luxemburgo da Silva
- Date of birth: 10 May 1952 (age 74)
- Place of birth: Nova Iguaçu, Brazil
- Position: Left wing back

Youth career
- 1968–1970: Botafogo
- 1971–1972: Flamengo

Senior career*
Years	Team	Apps	(Gls)
1972–1978	Flamengo	76	(4)
1978	Internacional	27	(0)
1979–1980	Botafogo	25	(0)
Total		128	(4)

Managerial career
- 1983: Campo Grande
- 1983: Rio Branco-ES
- 1984: Friburguense
- 1984: Al-Ittihad
- 1985: Democrata-GV
- 1987: America-RJ
- 1989–1990: Bragantino
- 1991: Guarani
- 1991: Flamengo
- 1992–1993: Ponte Preta
- 1993–1995: Palmeiras
- 1995: Flamengo
- 1995: Paraná
- 1995–1996: Palmeiras
- 1997: Santos
- 1998: Corinthians
- 1998–2000: Brazil
- 2001: Corinthians
- 2002: Palmeiras
- 2002–2004: Cruzeiro
- 2004: Santos
- 2004–2005: Real Madrid
- 2006–2007: Santos
- 2008–2009: Palmeiras
- 2009: Santos
- 2010: Atlético Mineiro
- 2010–2012: Flamengo
- 2012–2013: Grêmio
- 2013: Fluminense
- 2014–2015: Flamengo
- 2015: Cruzeiro
- 2015–2016: Tianjin Quanjian
- 2017: Sport Recife
- 2019: Vasco da Gama
- 2019–2020: Palmeiras
- 2020–2021: Vasco da Gama
- 2021: Cruzeiro
- 2023: Corinthians
Medal record
Men's football
Representing Brazil (as manager)
Copa América
Winner	1999
FIFA Confederations Cup
Runner-up	1999
- * Club domestic league appearances and goals

Vanderlei Luxemburgo da Silva (born 10 May 1952) is a retired former Brazilian professional football coach and player.

A left wingback, Luxemburgo represented Flamengo, Internacional and Botafogo before retiring in 1980. He subsequently became a coach and led Palmeiras, Corinthians, Cruzeiro and Santos to Série A titles, winning the tournament five times, a record total. In 2005 he worked at Real Madrid, but was dismissed in December of that year.

His surname is named after revolutionary Rosa Luxemburg.

== Playing career ==
Born in Nova Iguaçu, Rio de Janeiro, Luxemburgo played the most of his youth football for Botafogo, but made his official debut with Flamengo in 1972; at the club, he was mainly a backup to Júnior. He left Fla in 1978 to Internacional, where he would become a first-choice for the only time in his entire career, playing 27 matches.

Despite being regularly used, Luxemburgo returned to his first club Botafogo in 1979. He retired in 1980, aged 28, due to a knee injury.

== Coaching career ==
=== Early career ===
Before being a first team trainer, Luxemburgo spent the rest of the 1980 campaign with Antônio Lopes' Olaria, but not being officially under contract with the club. He was also Lopes' assistant at America-RJ (1981) and Vasco da Gama (1981–82).

Luxemburgo's first coaching experience occurred in 1983, with Campo Grande; he only lasted eight matches at the club, being sacked after altercations with the board. In the same year, he also managed Rio Branco-ES, winning the Campeonato Capixaba with the side.

In 1984, after managing Friburguense, Luxemburgo then moved abroad to Saudi Arabia's Al-Ittihad; initially Joubert's assistant, he was in subsequently charge of the club. He was at the helm of Democrata-GV in the following year, but only lasted three months.

Luxemburgo subsequently rejoined Lopes' staff at Fluminense in 1986, where he acted as head coach of the under-20 squad. In the following year, he replaced Pinheiro in charge of America-RJ. Another stint in the Middle East following, being again assistant of Joubert at Al-Shabab.

Luxemburgo returned to Brazil in October 1988, after being invited to coach Bragantino; initially expected to take over the reserve team (named Aspirantes), he convinced the board to become the head coach of the main squad instead. He led the club in winning campaigns of the 1989 Série B (their first-ever national title) and the 1990 Campeonato Paulista, the latter over Novorizontino in a final which was known as the final caipira.

=== Flamengo ===
In December 1990, Luxemburgo agreed to leave Bragantino to take over his former side Flamengo. Without the same success as at Bragantino, he left in August 1991 complaining about the club's structure.

=== Guarani and Ponte Preta ===
Shortly after leaving Flamengo, Luxemburgo took over Guarani, but resigned in November 1991 after alleging unpaid wages. He then moved to city rivals Ponte Preta in September 1992, but left in the following April to join Palmeiras.

=== Palmeiras ===
After joining Palmeiras in April 1993, Luxemburgo led the side to two the 1993 Campeonato Paulista title, ending a period of 17 years without a trophy for the club. In that season, he also won the 1993 Torneio Rio-São Paulo and the 1993 Série A.

During the 1994 campaign, Luxemburgo's side also won the Paulista and Série A trophies.

=== Flamengo return ===
In January 1995, Luxemburgo returned to Flamengo after two successful years at Palmeiras. On 13 July, after losing the 1995 Campeonato Carioca to Fluminense and having altercations with Romário, he resigned.

=== Paraná and Palmeiras return ===
In August 1995, Luxemburgo was appointed Paraná head coach, but returned to Palmeiras in November.

At Verdão, Luxemburgo won the 1996 Campeonato Paulista by scoring more than 100 goals during the tournament, winning 27 matches out of 30. On 12 December of that year, however, he confirmed that he would move to Santos due to "political issues" at Palmeiras.

=== Santos ===
Presented on 13 December 1996, Luxemburgo led Santos to the 1997 Torneio Rio-São Paulo title. In December, however, he left the side before the end of his contract, which led to criticism from club legend Pelé.

=== Corinthians ===
On 16 December 1997, Luxemburgo agreed to become the head coach of Corinthians. He led the club to the 1998 Série A title, but also had altercations with Marcelinho Carioca.

=== Brazil national team ===
On 10 August 1998, Luxemburgo replaced Zagallo as head coach of the Brazil national team after the 1998 FIFA World Cup. Despite winning the 1999 Copa América undefeated and finishing in the second place of the 1999 FIFA Confederations Cup, he had fiscal problems during his period ahead of the national team, being accused of tax evasion and false documentation (as he often signed his name as "Wanderley" instead of "Vanderlei").

Luxemburgo was also in charge of the under-23 team at the 2000 Summer Olympics in Sydney: after losing 1–2 in overtime to gold medal winners Cameroon in the quarter-finals, despite having a two men advantage in that game, he was sacked from the national side on 1 October of that year.

In 2001, he went back to Corinthians and won yet another State Championship. In 2003, he led Cruzeiro to win the Brazilian National League. Even more impressively, the club won two of the three competitions (the Campeonato Mineiro and the Copa do Brasil) without losing a single match. The following year he led Santos to win the Brazilian Championship.

=== Corinthians return ===
Luxemburgo returned to Timão on 5 February 2001, winning yet another Campeonato Paulista title. In the semifinal of that tournament, he also stirred up controversy by having a one-way transmission device on a forward of his club team during a match. He said that the Cameroon match inspired him to create a device in order to tell his players where and when to attack. The CBF ruled days later that such electronic devices were illegal, but did not penalize him for using it in that match.

On 12 December 2001, Luxemburgo was sacked.

=== Third spell at Palmeiras ===
On 30 December 2001, Luxemburgo agreed to return to Palmeiras for a third spell, but was unable to repeat the same success as his previous periods at the club. On 13 August 2002, he left the club to join Cruzeiro.

=== Cruzeiro ===
Luxemburgo debuted in charge of Cruzeiro on 18 August 2002, five days after signing, in a 0–0 draw against Botafogo. He then brought Alex back to the club, with the midfielder being a key unit during the club's treble campaign, where they won the 2003 Campeonato Mineiro, the 2003 Copa do Brasil and the 2003 Série A.

Despite having a very successful 2003 campaign, Luxemburgo was dismissed from the club on 27 February 2004; in the previous day, one day after a 0–0 home draw against Uberaba, he stated a "lack of tune" at the club, later endorsed by Alex.

=== Santos return ===
On 8 May 2004, Luxemburgo was officially announced back at Santos on a contract until the end of 2005. Despite being knocked out of the 2004 Copa Libertadores by Once Caldas in the quarter-finals, he led the side to the 2004 Série A title.

=== Real Madrid ===
On 30 December 2004, Luxemburgo was hired as Real Madrid's coach in the second half of the 2004–05 season, when Mariano García Remón was dismissed from the job. He led Real Madrid to seven consecutive league wins, putting them back in the title race, but ended up losing it four points behind Barcelona.

In the following season, Real Madrid started brightly. However, the introduction of a new formation (the Magic Rectangle, a 4–2–2–2 formation), combined with multiple injury issues and poor performances began Luxemburgo's downfall. Calls for him to resign were intensified after a humiliating 0–3 home defeat to long-time rivals, Barcelona. He was sacked on 5 December 2005, with Real Madrid announcing Juan Ramón López Caro as his successor.

=== Third spell at Santos ===
On 13 December 2005, Luxemburgo signed with Santos for the third time. He led the club to the 2006 Campeonato Paulista title (notably fielding 12 players shortly before a match against Corinthians), and ended the season in the fourth place of the Série A.

Luxemburgo continued with Santos in 2007 and won the Paulista again. He also saw Santos through the semi-finals of the 2007 Copa Libertadores, winning all the matches in the group stage and eliminating strong teams, such as Caracas in the round of 16 and América in the quarter-finals, before losing to Grêmio in the semis. Later, Luxemburgo finished second in the Série A. In both years, 2006 and 2007, he led Santos to a Copa Libertadores berth, but still left on 13 December 2007, after failing to agree new terms.

=== Fourth spell at Palmeiras ===
On 18 December 2007, Luxemburgo returned to Palmeiras for his fourth spell as head coach. At the club, he won the Paulistão for the third consecutive time.

With Palmeiras, he was eliminated from the 2008 Copa Sudamericana by Argentinos Juniors and from the 2008 Copa do Brasil by Sport Recife, the eventual champions. In the 2008 Série A, he reached fourth place with Palmeiras in a very competitive season, earning the club a spot in the 2009 Copa Libertadores.

Luxemburgo remained with Palmeiras in 2009. He managed the team to a successful campaign in the Paulista, but lost to Santos in the semi-finals. In the Copa Libertadores, he qualified the club to the round of 16 by defeating Colo-Colo 1–0 in Santiago, with Cleiton Xavier scoring a last minute long-range goal in the angle of Colo-Colo's goalkeeper. Palmeiras defeated Sport Recife on penalties in the Round of 16, but were eliminated by an away goal from Nacional from Uruguay drawing both matches, by 1–1 at home and 0–0 away.

In the 2009 Série A, Luxemburgo started well in the competition, but after an incident involving young striker Keirrison, Luxemburgo was dismissed from Verdão in the seventh round, on 27 June 2009.

=== Fourth spell at Santos ===
Luxemburgo was re-signed as head coach of Santos after a one and a half-year absence on 17 July 2009. On 7 December, he left after finishing 12th in the league, to sign with Atlético Mineiro.

=== Atlético Mineiro ===
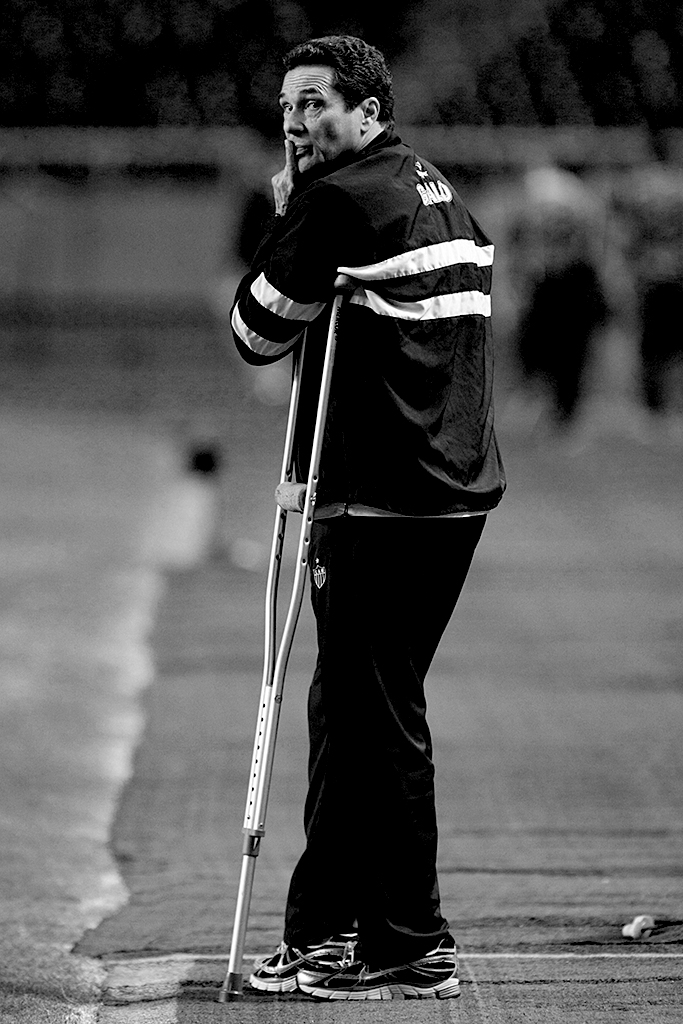
Luxemburgo in 2010

Presented at Galo on 23 January 2010 after signing a two-year deal, Luxemburgo won the 2010 Campeonato Mineiro after defeating Ipatinga in the finals. Knocked out of the 2010 Copa do Brasil in the quarter-finals, and after having poor results in the Brasileirão, he was sacked on 23 September.

=== Third spell at Flamengo ===
On 5 October 2010, Vanderlei Luxemburgo was named as a new head coach of Flamengo. He avoided relegation in his first year, and led the club to a 26-match unbeaten run in 2011, winning the 2011 Campeonato Carioca.

On 2 February 2012, Luxemburgo was dismissed after having altercations with the club's board.

=== Grêmio ===
On 21 February 2012, it was announced that Luxemburgo would be taking charge of Grêmio until 31 December 2012. On 29 April 2013, after getting involved in a fight in the game between Grêmio and Huachipato for the Libertadores Cup, Luxemburgo was suspended for six games in this competition.

On 29 June 2013, Luxemburgo was dismissed by directors of Grêmio.

=== Fluminense ===
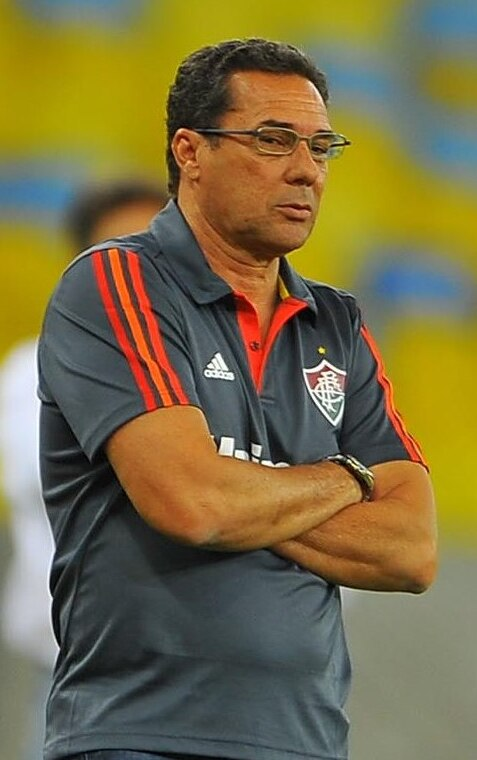
Luxemburgo in 2013

On 30 July 2013, Luxemburgo signed with carioca side Fluminense, that dismissed, one day earlier, Abel Braga. Luxemburgo defended his predecessor, calling him "winner", and lamented his resignation, a "culture of brazilian football". The coach, to resume, wants his players "wrathful with losses". On 12 November, Fluminense sacked Luxemburgo after a long winless streak. At the time, Fluminense stood in 18th place in the Brazilian Série A and was under relegation threat.

=== Fourth spell at Flamengo ===
On 23 July 2014, Luxemburgo was appointed head coach of Flamengo, returning to the club for the fourth time in this role. Luxa was ultimately successful in leading the club's struggle against relegation, earning important points in the tournament and taking the team to the upper half of the table, and had his contract renewed on 18 November.

On 25 May 2015, Luxemburgo was sacked from Flamengo after a winless start of the 2015 Série A.

=== Cruzeiro return ===
On 2 June 2015, Vanderlei Luxemburgo was named as a new head coach of Cruzeiro, but was dismissed after poor results on 31 August.

=== Tianjin Songjiang ===
On 23 September 2015, Vanderlei Luxemburgo was named as a new head coach of Tianjin Songjiang, for the 2016 season. He was sacked the following 5 June, with the club only in the eighth position, and was subsequently replaced by Fabio Cannavaro.

=== Sport Recife ===
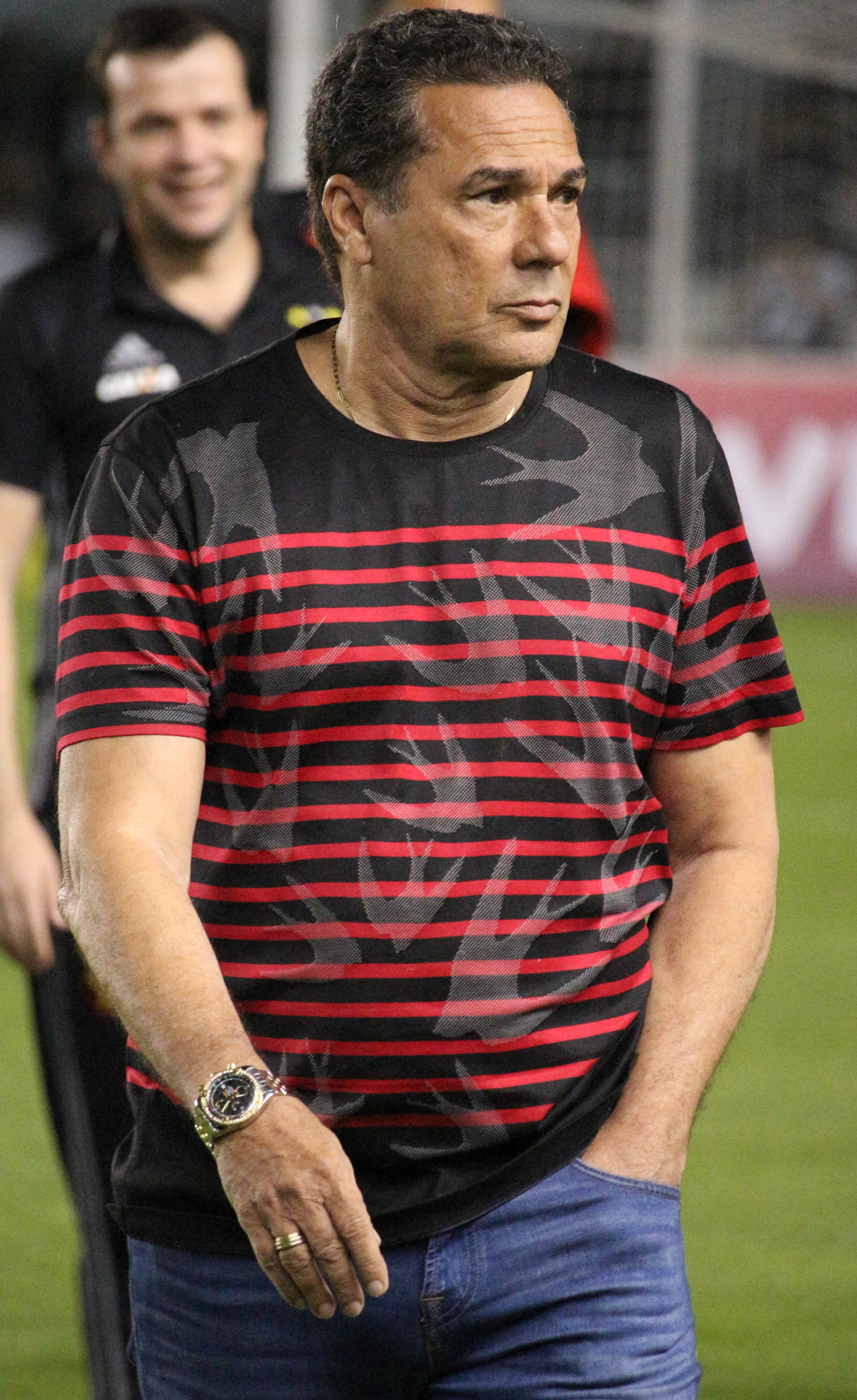
Luxemburgo with Sport Recife in 2017

On 29 May 2017, Luxemburgo was named as the new head coach Sport Recife, and won the year's Campeonato Pernambucano with the club. On 26 October, after a poor run of form, he was relieved from his duties.

=== Vasco da Gama ===
On 8 May 2019, Luxemburgo was named head coach of Vasco da Gama, agreeing to a contract until the end of the year. After helping the side avoid relegation, he departed the club on 13 December.

=== Fifth spell at Palmeiras ===
On 15 December 2019, Luxemburgo signed a two-year contract with Palmeiras, returning to the club after 11 years. He won the 2020 Campeonato Paulista with the club, being this the fifth time winning the competition with the club and ninth overall, and surpassed Lula as the most successful head coach of the tournament.

On 14 October 2020, after a 1–3 home defeat against Coritiba, Luxemburgo was sacked.

=== Vasco da Gama return ===
On 31 December 2020, it was announced the return of Luxemburgo to Vasco da Gama on a contract running until the end of the 2020 Campeonato Brasileiro Série A season.

=== Third spell at Cruzeiro ===
On 3 August 2021, Luxemburgo returned to Cruzeiro, with the club now in the Série B. He was dismissed on 28 December, after failing to achieve promotion to the top tier.

=== Third spell at Corinthians ===
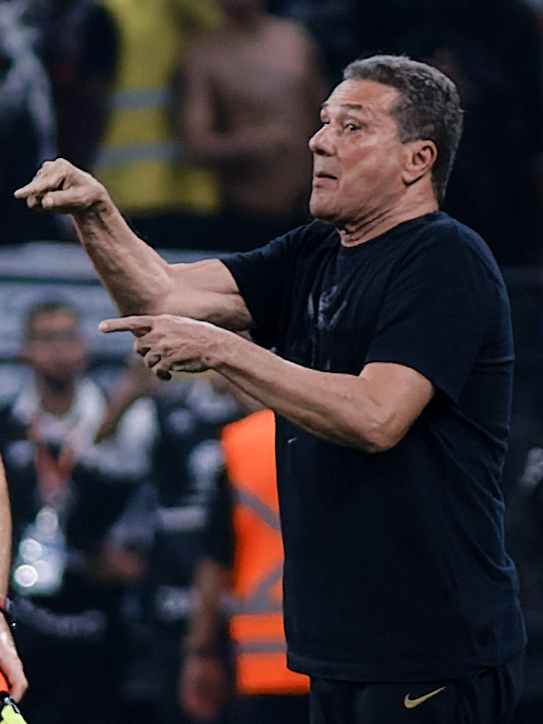
Luxemburgo coaching Corinthians in 2023

On 1 May 2023, Luxemburgo was announced as head coach of Corinthians in the top tier, signing a contract until the end of the year. He was sacked on 27 September, following a 1–1 home draw with Fortaleza in the semi-finals of the 2023 Copa Sudamericana.

== Career statistics ==
Club	Season	League			State league		Total	
Club	Season	Division	Apps	Goals	Apps	Goals	Apps	Goals
Flamengo	1972	Série A	0	0	4	0	4	0
Flamengo	1973	Série A	0	0	0	0	0	0
Flamengo	1974	Série A	6	0	13	2	19	2
Flamengo	1975	Série A	0	0	12	0	12	0
Flamengo	1976	Série A	4	0	15	1	19	1
Flamengo	1977	Série A	7	1	12	0	19	1
Flamengo	1978	Série A	0	0	3	0	3	0
Flamengo	Total		17	1	59	3	76	4
Internacional	1978	Série A	27	0	—		27	0
Botafogo	1979	Série A	7	0	16	0	23	0
Botafogo	1980	Série A	2	0	0	0	2	0
Botafogo	Total		9	0	16	0	25	0
Career total			53	1	75	3	128	4

== Managerial statistics ==
As of 23 April 2025

Team	Nat	From	To	Record								
Team	Nat	From	To	G	W	D	L	GF	GA	GD	Win %	Ref
Campo Grande	(Brazil)	January 1983	March 1983	8	2	2	4	9	8	+1	25.00	
Rio Branco-ES	(Brazil)	April 1983	December 1983	30	15	12	3	42	18	+24	50.00	
Friburguense	(Brazil)	June 1984	August 1984	6	0	2	4	4	15	−11	0.00	
Al-Ittihad	(Saudi Arabia)	1984	1984	11	4	3	4	15	11	+4	36.36	
Democrata-GV	(Brazil)	1985	1985	26	6	11	9	16	23	−7	23.08	
America-RJ	(Brazil)	March 1987	June 1987	18	4	10	4	15	12	+3	22.22	
Al-Shabab	(Saudi Arabia)	1987	1988	32	17	10	5	53	26	+27	53.13	
Bragantino	(Brazil)	October 1988	December 1990	105	52	31	22	117	70	+47	49.52	
Flamengo	(Brazil)	27 January 1991	18 August 1991	41	21	11	9	62	42	+20	51.22	
Guarani	(Brazil)	18 August 1991	November 1991	24	9	7	8	26	24	+2	37.50	
Ponte Preta	(Brazil)	20 March 1992	9 April 1993	59	21	21	17	75	63	+12	35.59	
Palmeiras	(Brazil)	19 April 1993	1 December 1994	126	79	27	20	231	101	+130	62.70	
Flamengo	(Brazil)	1 January 1995	13 July 1995	46	27	10	9	95	36	+59	58.70	
Paraná	(Brazil)	August 1995	November 1995	15	5	5	5	18	16	+2	33.33	
Palmeiras	(Brazil)	2 November 1995	13 December 1996	76	52	11	13	190	63	+127	68.42	
Santos	(Brazil)	13 December 1996	14 December 1997	78	37	19	22	137	103	+34	47.44	
Corinthians	(Brazil)	17 December 1997	December 1998	55	26	15	14	90	68	+22	47.27	
Brazil	(Brazil)	10 August 1998	30 September 2000	33	21	7	5	81	31	+50	63.64	
Corinthians	(Brazil)	5 February 2001	12 December 2001	64	32	13	19	127	87	+40	50.00	
Palmeiras	(Brazil)	30 December 2001	13 August 2002	28	14	9	5	55	38	+17	50.00	
Cruzeiro	(Brazil)	13 August 2002	27 February 2004	104	66	21	17	232	110	+122	63.46	
Santos	(Brazil)	8 May 2004	30 December 2004	52	28	12	12	109	61	+48	53.85	
Real Madrid	(Spain)	30 December 2004	4 December 2005	45	28	7	10	83	45	+38	62.22	
Santos	(Brazil)	13 December 2005	14 December 2007	143	84	26	33	236	141	+95	58.74	
Palmeiras	(Brazil)	18 December 2007	26 June 2009	93	53	22	18	164	104	+60	56.99	
Santos	(Brazil)	17 July 2009	6 December 2009	26	9	8	9	34	32	+2	34.62	
Atlético Mineiro	(Brazil)	8 December 2009	23 September 2010	50	21	11	18	95	78	+17	42.00	
Flamengo	(Brazil)	5 October 2010	2 February 2012	84	38	32	14	119	86	+33	45.24	
Grêmio	(Brazil)	21 February 2012	29 June 2013	90	51	21	18	144	74	+70	56.67	
Fluminense	(Brazil)	30 July 2013	11 November 2013	26	7	9	10	25	29	−4	26.92	
Flamengo	(Brazil)	23 July 2014	25 May 2015	57	32	11	14	88	52	+36	56.14	
Cruzeiro	(Brazil)	2 June 2015	31 August 2015	19	6	3	10	16	21	−5	31.58	
Tianjin Quanjian	(China)	24 September 2015	5 June 2016	14	6	4	4	22	12	+10	42.86	
Sport Recife	(Brazil)	29 May 2017	26 October 2017	34	11	8	15	39	40	−1	32.35	
Vasco da Gama	(Brazil)	8 May 2019	13 December 2019	34	12	12	10	36	35	+1	35.29	
Palmeiras	(Brazil)	15 December 2019	14 October 2020	35	17	13	5	53	28	+25	48.57	
Vasco da Gama	(Brazil)	31 December 2020	24 February 2021	12	3	4	5	11	17	−6	25.00	
Cruzeiro	(Brazil)	3 August 2021	28 December 2021	23	8	11	4	24	19	+5	34.78	
Corinthians	(Brazil)	1 May 2023	27 September 2023	38	14	12	12	42	40	+2	36.84	
Total				1,860	938	483	439	3,030	1,881	+1149	50.43	—

== Honours ==
=== Player ===
Flamengo

- Campeonato Carioca: 1972, 1974, 1978

=== Manager ===
==== Club ====
Rio Branco-ES

- Campeonato Capixaba: 1983

Bragantino

- Campeonato Brasileiro Série B: 1989
- Campeonato Paulista: 1990

Palmeiras

- Campeonato Paulista: 1993, 1994, 1996, 2008, 2020
- Campeonato Brasileiro Série A: 1993, 1994
- Torneio Rio – São Paulo: 1993

Santos

- Torneio Rio – São Paulo: 1997
- Campeonato Brasileiro Série A: 2004
- Campeonato Paulista: 2006, 2007

Corinthians

- Campeonato Brasileiro Série A: 1998
- Campeonato Paulista: 2001

Cruzeiro

- Campeonato Mineiro: 2003
- Copa do Brasil: 2003
- Campeonato Brasileiro Série A: 2003

Atlético Mineiro

- Campeonato Mineiro: 2010

Flamengo

- Campeonato Carioca: 2011

Sport

- Campeonato Pernambucano: 2017

==== International ====
Brazil

- Copa América: 1999

==== Individual ====
- IFFHS World's Best National Coach: 1999

== See also ==
- List of football managers with the most matches
- List of Brazil national football team managers
