= 1993 Campeonato Paulista =

Campeonato Paulista - Série A1
- Season: 1993
- Champions: Palmeiras
- Relegated: Araçatuba; Botafogo; Catanduvense; Inter de Limeira; Juventus; Marília; Noroeste; Olímpia; São Caetano; Sãocarlense; São José; Taquaritinga; XV de Jaú; XV de Piracicaba
- Copa do Brasil: Palmeiras; Corinthians
- Matches: 448
- Goals: 1,171 (2.61 per match)
- Top goalscorer: Viola (Corinthians) - 20 goals
- Biggest home win: Novorizontino 7-0 Catanduvense (May 9, 1993)
- Biggest away win: Taquaritinga 0-4 Ferroviária (February 10, 1993); Portuguesa 0-4 Palmeiras (February 28, 1993); Noroeste 0-4 Mogi Mirim (February 28, 1993); Juventus 0-4 União São João (March 14, 1993); São Caetano 0-4 América (May 9, 1993)
- Highest scoring: Taquaritinga 4-3 Catanduvense (February 3, 1993); São Paulo 6-1 Noroeste (March 3, 1993); Portuguesa 4-3 Rio Branco (March 17, 1993); Santos 2-5 Corinthians (March 21, 1993); Ferroviária 5-2 Araçatuba (April 11, 1993); Portuguesa 5-2 Noroeste(April 28, 1993); Novorizontino 7-0 Catanduvense (May 9, 1993); Palmeiras 6-1 Rio Branco (May 16, 1993); São Paulo 6-1 Santos (June 3, 1993)

The 1993 Campeonato Paulista de Futebol Profissional da Primeira Divisão - Série A1 was the 92nd season of São Paulo's top professional football league. Palmeiras won the championship for the 19th time. Fourteen teams were relegated.

== Championship ==
The thirty teams of the championship were divided into two groups, Group A, one with sixteen teams (the ten best teams of Group A and the six best teams of Group B in the previous year) and Group B, with fourteen (the bottom four of Group A, the other teams of Group B and the two teams that had been promoted from the second level). Every team played twice against the teams of its own group, and the six best teams of Group A and the two best teams of Group B qualified to the Second phase. However, in that year, the championship was slated to be reduced to sixteen teams, and as such, the four bottom teams of Group A and the ten bottom teams of Group B were relegated to the Second Level.

The Second phase's eight teams were divided into two groups of four, with every team playing twice against the teams of its own group and the winners of each group qualifying to the Finals.

=== First phase ===
==== Group A ====
Pos	Team	Pld	W	D	L	GF	GA	GD	Pts	Qualification or relegation
1	Palmeiras	30	19	6	5	53	27	+26	44	Qualified
2	São Paulo	30	16	7	7	53	24	+29	39	Qualified
3	Corinthians	30	16	7	7	59	34	+25	39	Qualified
4	Santos	30	16	7	7	55	41	+14	39	Qualified
5	Guarani	30	15	6	9	41	41	0	36	Qualified
6	Rio Branco	30	13	10	7	43	32	+11	36	Qualified
7	Mogi Mirim	30	11	14	5	43	32	+11	36	
8	União São João	30	12	11	7	45	35	+10	35	
9	Bragantino	30	11	8	11	33	34	−1	30	
10	Portuguesa	30	8	10	12	48	52	−4	26	
11	Ponte Preta	30	7	11	12	32	41	−9	25	
12	Ituano	30	9	6	15	31	42	−11	24	
13	XV de Piracicaba	30	4	13	13	29	47	−18	21	Relegated
14	Juventus	30	5	7	18	30	60	−30	17	Relegated
15	Marília	30	4	9	17	30	49	−19	17	Relegated
16	Noroeste	30	5	6	19	26	60	−34	16	Relegated

Updated to match(es) played on 9 May 1993. Source: RSSSF.com
Rules for classification: 1) points; 2) wins; 3) goal difference; 4) number of goals scored.

==== Group B ====
Pos	Team	Pld	W	D	L	GF	GA	GD	Pts	Qualification or relegation
1	Novorizontino	26	14	8	4	55	25	+30	36	Qualified
2	Ferroviária	26	13	10	3	47	26	+21	36	Qualified
3	América	26	15	5	6	41	24	+17	35	
4	Santo André	26	11	10	5	33	23	+10	32	
5	São José	26	9	11	6	27	23	+4	29	Relegated
6	Sãocarlense	26	9	8	9	38	36	+2	26	Relegated
7	Taquaritinga	26	9	8	9	29	30	−1	26	Relegated
8	Araçatuba	26	8	10	8	26	31	−5	26	Relegated
9	Botafogo	26	8	9	9	25	23	+2	25	Relegated
10	São Caetano	26	10	3	13	32	38	−6	23	Relegated
11	XV de Jaú	26	8	7	11	34	35	−1	23	Relegated
12	Inter de Limeira	26	6	6	14	21	37	−16	18	Relegated
13	Olímpia	26	5	6	15	21	44	−23	16	Relegated
14	Catanduvense	26	3	7	16	20	54	−34	13	Relegated

Updated to match(es) played on 9 May 1993. Source: RSSSF.com
Rules for classification: 1) points; 2) wins; 3) goal difference; 4) number of goals scored.

=== Second phase ===
==== Group 1 ====
Pos	Team	Pld	W	D	L	GF	GA	GD	Pts	Qualification or relegation
1	Palmeiras	6	6	0	0	15	2	+13	12	Qualified
2	Guarani	6	2	2	2	6	6	0	6	
3	Ferroviária	6	1	2	3	4	9	−5	4	
4	Rio Branco	6	0	2	4	4	12	−8	2	

Updated to match(es) played on 3 June 1993. Source: RSSSF.com
Rules for classification: 1) points; 2) wins; 3) goal difference; 4) number of goals scored.

==== Group 2 ====
Pos	Team	Pld	W	D	L	GF	GA	GD	Pts	Qualification or relegation
1	Corinthians	6	4	1	1	8	3	+5	9	Qualified
2	São Paulo	6	4	0	2	14	6	+8	8	
3	Santos	6	2	1	3	10	15	−5	5	
4	Novorizontino	6	1	0	5	6	14	−8	2	

Updated to match(es) played on 3 June 1993. Source: RSSSF.com
Rules for classification: 1) points; 2) wins; 3) goal difference; 4) number of goals scored.

=== Finals ===
Team 1	Agg.	Team 2	1st leg	2nd leg
Corinthians	1–4	Palmeiras	1–0	0–4 (a.e.t)
