= 1993 Torneio Rio-São Paulo =

Torneio Rio–São Paulo
- Season: 1993
- Champions: Palmeiras (4th title)
- Matches: 26
- Goals: 81 (3.12 per match)
- Top goalscorer: Renato Gaúcho (Flamengo) – 6 goals

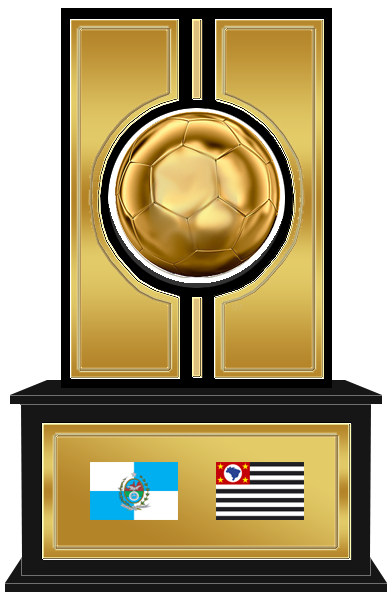
The trophy of Torneio Rio-São Paulo

The 1993 Torneio Rio São Paulo was the 20th edition of the Torneio Rio-São Paulo football competition in Brazil. It took place between 23 June to 7 August 1993.

== Participants ==
Team	City	Ground	Nº participations	Best result
Botafogo	(Rio de Janeiro (state)) Rio de Janeiro	Maracanã	17	Champions: 1962, 1964 (shared), 1966 (shared)
Corinthians	(São Paulo (state)) São Paulo	Pacaembu	20	Champions: 1950, 1953, 1954, 1966 (shared)
Flamengo	(Rio de Janeiro (state)) Rio de Janeiro	Maracanã	19	Champions: 1961
Fluminense	(Rio de Janeiro (state)) Rio de Janeiro	Maracanã	19	Champions: 1957, 1960
Palmeiras	(São Paulo (state)) São Paulo	Parque Antártica	20	Champions: 1933, 1951, 1965
Portuguesa	(São Paulo (state)) São Paulo	Canindé	20	Champions: 1952, 1955
Santos	(São Paulo (state)) Santos	Vila Belmiro	16	Champions: 1959, 1963, 1964 (shared), 1966 (shared)
Vasco da Gama	(Rio de Janeiro (state)) Rio de Janeiro	São Januário	20	Champions: 1958, 1966 (shared)

== Format ==
The clubs were separated in two groups: Group A and Group B, playing a double round-robin in each group, with the best clubs of each group advanced to the finals.

== Tournament ==
Following is the summary of the 1993 Torneio Rio-São Paulo tournament:

=== Group A ===
Pos	Team	Pld	W	D	L	GF	GA	GD	Pts	Qualification
1	(São Paulo (state)) Corinthians	6	5	1	0	15	9	+6	11	Qualified to finals
2	(São Paulo (state)) Portuguesa	6	2	1	3	7	9	−2	5	
3	(Rio de Janeiro (state)) Botafogo	6	1	2	3	7	8	−1	4	
4	(Rio de Janeiro (state)) Vasco da Gama	6	1	2	3	11	14	−3	4	

Source: RSSSF
Rules for classification: 1) points; 2) wins; 3) goal difference; 4) goals for.

=== Group B ===
Pos	Team	Pld	W	D	L	GF	GA	GD	Pts	Qualification
1	(São Paulo (state)) Palmeiras	6	3	1	2	10	6	+4	7	Qualified to finals
2	(São Paulo (state)) Santos	6	3	1	2	10	11	−1	7	
3	(Rio de Janeiro (state)) Flamengo	6	2	2	2	13	10	+3	6	
4	(Rio de Janeiro (state)) Fluminense	6	1	2	3	6	12	−6	4	

Source: RSSSF
Rules for classification: 1) points; 2) wins; 3) goal difference; 4) goals for.

=== Finals ===
4 August 1993

Palmeiras (São Paulo (state))	2–0	(São Paulo (state)) Corinthians
Edmundo 27', 29'	Report

Pacaembu, São Paulo
Attendance: 18,719
Referee: Dionísio Roberto Domingos

7 August 1993

Corinthians (São Paulo (state))	0–0	(São Paulo (state)) Palmeiras
	Report

Pacaembu, São Paulo
Attendance: 28,363
Referee: Márcio Rezende de Freitas

== Top scorers ==
Rank	Player	Club	Goals
1	Renato Gaúcho	Flamengo	6
2	Válber	Corinthians	5
3	Bentinho	Portuguesa	4
3	Pimentel	Vasco da Gama	4
