= Taça Cidade de São Paulo =

- Organising body: FPF
- Founded: 1942
- Abolished: 1952
- Region: São Paulo, Brazil
- Related competitions: Campeonato Paulista
- Most successful club(s): Corinthians (5 titles)

The Taça Cidade de São Paulo (English: São Paulo City Cup) was a tournament organized by Federação Paulista de Futebol (FPF), reuniting the three best placed teams of previously season Campeonato Paulista edition. It was the first competition originally created by the FPF, founded in 1941. All the games was disputed at the newly built Estádio do Pacaembu.

The tournament ended in 1952, when Corinthians won the definitive possession of the trophy after conquering it 5 times.

== List of champions ==
Following is the list with all the champions of the Taça Cidade de São Paulo:

Season	Champions	Runners-up	Third place
1942	Corinthians (1)	São Paulo	Palmeiras
1943	Corinthians (2)	São Paulo	Palmeiras
1944	São Paulo (1)	Corinthians	Palmeiras
1945	Palmeiras (1)	Corinthians	São Paulo
1946	Palmeiras (2)	São Paulo	Corinthians
1947	Corinthians (3)	Portuguesa	São Paulo
1948	Corinthians (4)	Palmeiras	Portuguesa
1949	Santos (1)	Ypiranga	São Paulo
1950	Palmeiras (3)	São Paulo	Portuguesa
1951	Palmeiras (4)	São Paulo	Santos
1952	Corinthians (5)	Portuguesa	Palmeiras

== Titles by team ==
Rank	Club	Winners	Winning years
1	Corinthians	5	1942, 1943, 1947, 1948, 1952
2	Palmeiras	4	1945, 1946, 1950, 1951
3	Santos	1	1949
3	São Paulo	1	1944
