= List of Santos FC seasons =

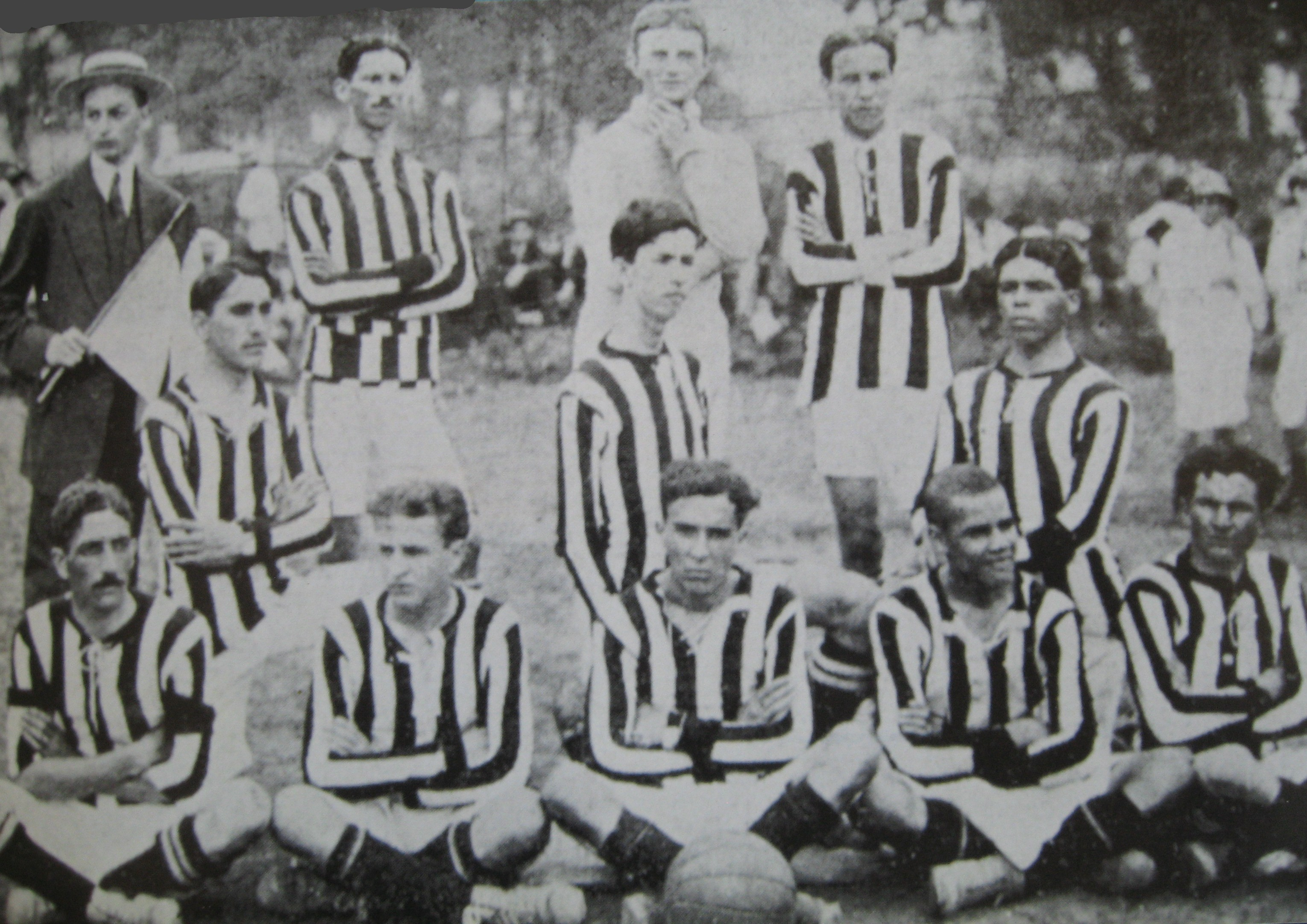
Santos team in 1913

Santos FC is a football club based in Santos, that competes in the Campeonato Paulista, São Paulo's state league, and the Campeonato Brasileiro Série A or Brasileirão, Brazil's national league. The club was founded in 1912 by the initiative of three sports enthusiasts from Santos by the names of Raimundo Marques, Mário Ferraz de Campos, and Argemiro de Souza Júnior, and played its first friendly match on 23 June 1912. Initially Santos played against other local clubs in the city and state championships, but in 1959 the club became one of the founding members of the Taça Brasil, Brazil's first truly national league. As of 2022, Santos was one of only three clubs never to have been relegated from the top level of Brazilian football, the others being São Paulo, Flamengo. Until 2023, where they suffered their first relegation of its history.

Santos enjoyed a successful start in the Brasileirão, finishing runners-up in the competition's first season. In the period from 1956 to 1974, the "Peixe" team won the Brasileirão six times, including a record-consecutive five titles from 1961 to 1965, and the Campeonato Paulista 11 times. The club did not win the league again until 2002. In 1978 Santos had finished 23rd, which remains, as of 2010, the club's lowest finishing position. Santos became the first club in the world to win the continental treble during the 1962 season consisting of the Paulista, Taça Brasil, and the Copa Libertadores. In 1955, Lula was appointed manager and assembled what would later be known as the Os Santásticos. In 1961 he led the club to its first league title and repeated the feat the following four seasons when the club also won the Copa Libertadores for the first time and successfully defended the trophy once.

Newly elected president Luis Álvaro Ribeiro's appointment of Muricy Ramalho as coach and the rise of stars such as Neymar and Ganso in 2010 marked the beginning of another spell of sustained success. In 2010 Santos won the Copa do Brasil for the first time. In May 2011 Santos defeated Peñarol in the Copa Libertadores final 2–1 to win the Copa Libertadores for the first time in 49 years. The club has won the Brasileirão championship a record eight times, the Campeonato Paulista 19 times, the Copa do Brasil once, the Torneio Rio – São Paulo five times, the Copa Paulista once, the Copa Libertadores three times, the Copa CONMEBOL once, the Recopa Sudamericana once, the Intercontinental Cup twice and the Intercontinental Supercup one time.

The table details the club's achievements in the early regional championships and in all national and international first-team competitions for each completed season since the club's formation in 1912. Note that the "three points for a win" system was used for the first time in Brazil during the 1995 season. Every season from 1994 and before used a system that awarded 2 points for a win and 1-point for a draw.

== Key ==
Especially short competitions such as the Recopa Sudamericana, Intercontinental Cup (now defunct), or FIFA Club World Cup are not generally considered to contribute towards a Double or Treble. Dashes (—) signify that the club did not qualify for the mentioned competition(s) in a season. The term "N/A", which stands for "non-available" signify that the tournament(s) did not exist during that time.

Key
FP	Final position	W	Champion	1st	First place
Pld	Played	RU	Runner-up	2nd	Second place
W	Won	SF	Semifinalists	3rd	Third place
D	Drawn	QF	Quarterfinalists		Promoted
L	Lost	R16	Eliminated at the round of 16		Relegated
GS	Goals scored	R32	Eliminated at the round of 32	†	Achieved the Double
GA	Goals against	GS	Eliminated at the Group stage	‡	Achieved the Continental Double
Pts.	Points	3R	Eliminated in the third round	§	Achieved the Treble
		2R	Eliminated in the second round		
		1R	Eliminated in the first round		

== Seasons ==
=== Pre-Brasileirão era ===
During this period Brazil did not have a national football league. Santos competed in the championship of the São Paulo region, and competed in the Campeonato Santista twice.

Season	Domestic leagues									Other competitions		Season top scorer	
Season	Tournament	FP	Pld.	W	D	L	GS	GA	Pts.	Other competitions		Name	Goals
1912	No competitive football was played during Santos' inaugural year											(Brazil) Arnaldo Patusca	2
1913	Santista	1st	6	6	0	0	35	7	12	—		(Brazil) Paul	7
1913	Paulista	6th	4	1	0	3	10	22	2	—		(Brazil) Paul	7
1914	No competitive football was played due to financial crisis											(Brazil) Arnaldo Patusca (Brazil) Adolpho Millon	4
1915	Santista	1st	10	10	0	0	42	4	20	—		(Brazil) Araken Patusca	16
1916	Paulista	5th	11	4	1	6	23	31	9	—		(Brazil) Araken Patusca	14
1917	Paulista	4th	16	8	2	6	44	36	18	—		(Brazil) Araken Patusca	23
1918	Paulista	4th	13	7	4	2	42	26	18	—		(Brazil) Araken Patusca	32
1919	Paulista	6th	18	6	1	11	36	43	13	—		(Brazil) Haroldo	14
1920	Paulista	10th	7	1	0	6	13	33	2	—		(Brazil) Castelhano	14
1921	Paulista	10th	22	5	3	14	26	61	13	—		(Brazil) Constantino	12
1922	Paulista	11th	11	2	1	8	17	31	5	—		(Brazil) Constantino	12
1923	Paulista	9th	10	2	3	5	12	19	7	—		(Brazil) Constantino	9
1924	Paulista	4th	17	9	3	5	44	29	21	—		(Brazil) Araken Patusca (Brazil) Siriri	19
1925	Paulista	4th	10	6	1	3	19	15	13	—		(Brazil) Araken Patusca	22
1926	Paulista	4th	9	5	1	3	24	17	11	—		(Brazil) Araken Patusca	25
1927	Paulista	2nd	16	14	0	2	100	33	28	—		(Brazil) Araken Patusca (Note: Top scorer in the Paulista tournament (31 goals))	53
1928	Paulista	2nd	12	9	1	2	42	12	19	—		(Brazil) Araken Patusca	19
1929	Paulista	2nd	7	5	1	1	30	13	11	—		(Brazil) Feitiço (Note: Top scorer in the Paulista tournament (12 goals))	39
1930	Paulista	4th	26	18	4	4	80	38	40	—		(Brazil) Feitiço (Note: Top scorer in the Paulista tournament (37 goals))	48
1931	Paulista	3rd	25	18	6	1	79	28	42	—		(Brazil) Feitiço (Note: Top scorer in the Paulista tournament (39 goals))	49
1932	Paulista	8th	11	5	0	6	26	31	10	—		(Brazil) Feitiço	13
1933	Paulista	5th	14	6	1	7	41	38	13	Torneio Rio – São Paulo	9th	(Brazil) Vítor Gonçalves	18
1934	Paulista	6th	14	5	3	6	22	27	13	—		(Brazil) Mendes	11
1935	Paulista	1st	12	9	2	1	31	11	20	—		(Brazil) Saci	14
1936	Paulista	4th	21	13	2	6	70	37	28	—		(Brazil) Raul	36
1937	Paulista	5th	14	5	4	5	27	20	24	—		(Brazil) Gradim	19
1938	Paulista	6th	10	4	1	5	22	18	9	—		(Brazil) Gradim	20
1939	Paulista	6th	20	8	4	8	35	33	20	—		(Brazil) Raul	22
1940	Paulista	7th	20	7	4	9	51	49	18	—		(Brazil) Molina (Brazil) Raul	13
1941	Paulista	5th	20	8	4	8	59	60	20	—		(Brazil) Carabina	30
1942	Paulista	7th	20	7	4	9	59	51	28	—		(Brazil) Rui	19
1943	Paulista	6th	20	10	1	9	45	39	21	—		(Brazil) Rui	19
1944	Paulista	6th	20	8	4	8	39	41	20	—		(Brazil) Antoninho	12
1945	Paulista	6th	20	8	2	10	34	46	18	—		(Brazil) Jorginho	17
1946	Paulista	4th	20	9	4	7	37	32	22	—		(Brazil) Caxambu	26
1947	Paulista	6th	20	6	7	7	33	27	19	—		(Brazil) Adolfrises	16
1948	Paulista	2nd	20	15	2	3	54	31	32	—		(Brazil) Odair	20
1949	Paulista	4th	22	11	4	7	51	40	26	—		(Brazil) Odair	20
1950	Paulista	3rd	22	13	5	4	47	34	31	—		(Brazil) Odair	25
1951	Paulista	5th	28	16	5	7	69	40	37	—		(Brazil) Odair	36
1952	Paulista	5th	30	13	8	9	62	46	34	Torneio Rio – São Paulo	3rd	(Brazil) Nicácio	16
1953	Paulista	7th	28	12	3	13	60	52	27	Torneio Rio – São Paulo	9th	(Brazil) Vasconcelos (Note: Top scorer in the Torneio Rio – São Paulo tournament (8 goals))	25
1954	Paulista	4th	26	16	2	8	70	43	34	Torneio Rio – São Paulo	6th	(Brazil) Vasconcelos	25
1955	Paulista	1st	26	19	2	5	71	40	40	Torneio Rio – São Paulo	5th	(Brazil) Del Vecchio (Note: Top scorer in the Paulista tournament (23 goals))	38
1956	Paulista	1st	36	29	4	3	98	36	62	—		(Brazil) Pagão	34
1957	Paulista	2nd	37	26	4	7	144	65	56	Torneio Rio – São Paulo	4th	(Brazil) Pelé (Note: Top scorer in the Paulista tournament (17 goals))	57
1958	Paulista	1st	38	29	6	3	143	40	64	Torneio Rio – São Paulo	7th	(Brazil) Pelé (Note: Top scorer in the Paulista tournament (58 goals))	80

=== Brasileirão era ===
In 1959, the Taça Brasil, Brazil's first national football league, was formed, with Santos among the founder members. The club continue to participate in the Paulista championship which continued alongside the Brasileirão. Clubs qualified to the Taça Brasil based on their placings in the regional championships until 1967, when it became open to all teams through the Robertão.

Season	Domestic leagues									Cup	South America		Other competitions		Season top scorer	
Season	Tournament	FP	Pld.	W	D	L	GS	GA	Pts.	Cup	South America		Other competitions		Name	Goals
1959	Paulista	2nd	41	30	5	6	155	58	65	N/A	N/A		Torneio Rio – São Paulo	1st	(Brazil) Pelé (Note: Top scorer in the Paulista tournament (44 goals))	100
1959	Taça Brasil	2nd	5	2	1	2	9	7	5	N/A	N/A		Torneio Rio – São Paulo	1st	(Brazil) Pelé	100
1960	Paulista	1st	34	22	6	6	100	44	48	N/A	—		Torneio Rio – São Paulo	8th	(Brazil) Pelé (Note: Top scorer in the Paulista tournament (34 goals))	61
1961 ^{†}	Paulista	1st	30	25	3	2	113	33	53	N/A	—		Torneio Rio – São Paulo	5th	(Brazil) Pelé (Note: Top scorer in the Paulista tournament (47 goals)) (Note: Top scorer in the Taça Brasil tournament (9 goals))	110
1961 ^{†}	Taça Brasil	1st	5	3	1	1	18	6	7	N/A	—		Torneio Rio – São Paulo	5th	(Brazil) Pelé	110
1962 ^{§}	Paulista	1st	30	24	5	1	105	28	53	N/A	Copa Libertadores	W	Intercontinental Cup	W	(Brazil) Pelé (Note: Top scorer in the Paulista tournament (37 goals)) (Note: Top scorer in the Intercontinental Cup tournament (5 goals))	62
1962 ^{§}	Taça Brasil	1st	5	3	1	1	15	7	10	N/A	Copa Libertadores	W	Intercontinental Cup	W	(Brazil) Pelé	62
1963 ^{‡}	Paulista	3rd	30	14	8	8	69	52	36	N/A	Copa Libertadores	W	Torneio Rio – São Paulo	1st	(Brazil) Pelé (Note: Top scorer in the Paulista tournament (22 goals)) (Note: Top scorer in the Torneio Rio – São Paulo tournament (14 goals)) (Note: Top scorer in the Taça Brasil tournament (12 goals)) (Note: Top scorer in the Intercontinental Cup tournament (2 goals))	67
1963 ^{‡}	Taça Brasil	1st	4	4	0	0	15	4	8	N/A	Copa Libertadores	W	Intercontinental Cup	W	(Brazil) Pelé	67
1964 ^{†}	Paulista	1st	30	20	4	6	95	47	44	N/A	Copa Libertadores	SF	Torneio Rio – São Paulo	1st	(Brazil) Pelé (Note: Top scorer in the Paulista tournament (34 goals)) (Note: Top scorer in the Taça Brasil tournament (7 goals))	58
1964 ^{†}	Taça Brasil	1st	6	5	1	0	20	5	11	N/A	Copa Libertadores	SF	Torneio Rio – São Paulo	1st	(Brazil) Pelé	58
1965 ^{†}	Paulista	1st	30	25	3	2	93	28	53	N/A	Copa Libertadores	SF	Torneio Rio – São Paulo	4th	(Brazil) Pelé (Note: Top scorer in the Paulista tournament (49 goals)) (Note: Top scorer in the Copa Libertadores tournament (7 goals))	96
1965 ^{†}	Taça Brasil	1st	4	3	1	0	11	4	7	N/A	Copa Libertadores	SF	Torneio Rio – São Paulo	4th	(Brazil) Pelé	96
1966	Paulista	3rd	28	16	6	6	70	42	38	N/A	—		Torneio Rio – São Paulo	1st	(Brazil) Toninho Guerreiro (Note: Top scorer in the Paulista tournament (27 goals)) (Note: Top scorer in the Taça Brasil tournament (10 goals))	60
1966	Taça Brasil	2nd	5	2	0	3	13	15	4	N/A	—		Torneio Rio – São Paulo	1st	(Brazil) Toninho Guerreiro	60
1967	Paulista	1st	26	16	9	1	61	32	41	N/A	—		—		(Brazil) Pelé	55
1967	Robertão	6th	14	5	5	4	21	16	15	N/A	—		—		(Brazil) Pelé	55
1968 ^{†}	Paulista	1st	26	22	1	3	71	22	45	N/A	—		Recopa Sudamericana (CI)	1st	(Brazil) Toninho Guerreiro (Note: Top scorer in the Robertão tournament (18 goals)) (Note: Top scorer in the Intercontinental Supercup tournament (1 goal))	76
1968 ^{†}	Robertão	1st	19	12	4	3	44	20	28	N/A	—		Intercontinental Supercup	W	(Brazil) Toninho Guerreiro	76
1969	Paulista	1st	29	19	4	6	66	31	42	N/A	—		Recopa Sudamericana (CI)	4th	(Brazil) Pelé (Note: Top scorer in the Paulista tournament (26 goals))	57
1969	Robertão	8th	16	5	5	6	27	24	15	N/A	—		Recopa Sudamericana (CI)	4th	(Brazil) Pelé	57
1970	Paulista	4th	18	8	5	5	34	21	21	N/A	—		—		(Brazil) Pelé	47
1970	Robertão	10th	16	5	6	5	20	20	16	N/A	—		—		(Brazil) Pelé	47
1971	Paulista	4th	22	10	8	4	29	23	28	N/A	—		—		(Brazil) Pelé	29
1971	Brasileirão	9th	25	9	9	7	24	16	27	N/A	—		—		(Brazil) Pelé	29
1972	Paulista	3rd	22	14	1	7	31	21	29	N/A	—		—		(Brazil) Pelé	50
1972	Brasileirão	8th	28	12	9	7	34	22	33	N/A	—		—		(Brazil) Pelé	50
1973	Paulista	1st	23	12	8	3	28	11	32	N/A	—		—		(Brazil) Pelé (Note: Top scorer in the Paulista tournament (11 goals))	52
1973	Brasileirão	6th	37	17	12	8	56	29	49	N/A	—		—		(Brazil) Pelé	52
1974	Paulista	3rd	26	12	11	3	35	22	35	N/A	—		—		(Brazil) Pelé	20
1974	Brasileirão	3rd	27	13	8	6	41	25	34	N/A	—		—		(Brazil) Pelé	20
1975	Paulista	5th	32	15	6	11	36	25	36	N/A	—		—		(Brazil) Cláudio Adão	29
1975	Brasileirão	26th	16	6	4	6	20	18	20	N/A	—		—		(Brazil) Cláudio Adão	29
1976	Paulista	13th	17	6	5	6	15	16	17	N/A	—		—		(Brazil) Toinzinho	9
1976	Brasileirão	20th	13	6	5	2	14	10	18	N/A	—		—		(Brazil) Toinzinho	9
1977	Paulista	6th	43	17	12	14	47	43	49	N/A	—		—		(Brazil) Juary	22
1977	Brasileirão	21st	18	5	6	7	21	22	20	N/A	—		—		(Brazil) Juary	22
1978	Paulista	1st	54	26	16	14	80	48	68	N/A	—		—		(Brazil) Juary (Note: Top scorer in the Paulista tournament (29 goals))	33
1978	Brasileirão	23rd	26	7	10	9	32	25	29	N/A	—		—		(Brazil) Juary	33
1979	Paulista	7th	43	16	16	11	55	45	48	N/A	—		—		(Brazil) Juary	38
1980	Paulista	2nd	38	16	16	6	48	32	48	N/A	—		—		(Brazil) Rubens Feijão (Brazil) Nílton Batata	16
1980	Brasileirão	7th	18	11	3	4	29	12	25	N/A	—		—		(Brazil) Rubens Feijão (Brazil) Nílton Batata	16
1981	Paulista	4th	50	18	15	17	58	53	51	N/A	—		—		(Brazil) João Paulo	19
1981	Brasileirão	9th	17	8	6	3	27	12	22	N/A	—		—		(Brazil) João Paulo	19
1982	Paulista	9th	38	10	17	11	37	35	37	N/A	—		—		(Brazil) João Paulo	16
1982	Brasileirão	7th	18	9	5	4	27	16	23	N/A	—		—		(Brazil) João Paulo	16
1983	Paulista	3rd	46	20	18	8	64	40	58	N/A	—		—		(Brazil) Serginho Chulapa (Note: Top scorer in the Paulista tournament (22 goals)) (Note: Top scorer in the Brasileirão tournament (22 goals))	45
1983	Brasileirão	2nd	26	13	10	3	45	28	36	N/A	—		—		(Brazil) Serginho Chulapa	45
1984	Paulista	1st	38	22	13	3	54	19	57	N/A	Copa Libertadores	1R	—		(Brazil) Serginho Chulapa (Note: Top scorer in the Paulista tournament (16 goals))	29
1984	Brasileirão	9th	20	11	6	3	39	16	28	N/A	Copa Libertadores	1R	—		(Brazil) Serginho Chulapa	29
1985	Paulista	6th	38	14	12	12	35	34	40	N/A	—		—		(Brazil) Lima	23
1985	Brasileirão	21st	20	7	6	7	23	25	20	N/A	—		—		(Brazil) Lima	23
1986	Paulista	4th	40	15	8	17	44	48	38	N/A	—		—		(Brazil) Serginho Chulapa	23
1986	Brasileirão	19th	26	9	11	6	25	16	29	N/A	—		—		(Brazil) Serginho Chulapa	23
1987	Paulista	3rd	40	16	17	7	49	32	49	N/A	—		—		(Brazil) Mendonça	15
1988	Paulista	7th	25	10	8	7	25	19	28	N/A	Supercopa Sudamericana	1R	—		(Brazil) Mendonça	15
1988	Brasileirão	18th	23	7	7	9	19	25	21	N/A	Supercopa Sudamericana	1R	—		(Brazil) Mendonça	15
1989	Paulista	6th	25	7	14	4	20	16	28	—	Supercopa Sudamericana	1R	—		(Brazil) Juninho (Brazil) Sócrates	11
1989	Brasileirão	12th	18	5	6	7	13	16	16	—	Supercopa Sudamericana	1R	—		(Brazil) Juninho (Brazil) Sócrates	11
1990	Paulista	5th	35	12	16	7	29	25	40	—	Supercopa Sudamericana	1R	—		(Brazil) Paulinho McLaren	13
1990	Brasileirão	7th	21	7	9	5	20	15	23	—	Supercopa Sudamericana	1R	—		(Brazil) Paulinho McLaren	13
1991	Paulista	7th	26	7	13	6	21	15	27	—	Supercopa Sudamericana	QF	—		(Brazil) Paulinho McLaren (Note: Top scorer in the Brasileirão tournament (15 goals))	23
1991	Brasileirão	8th	19	17	5	7	23	20	39	—	Supercopa Sudamericana	QF	—		(Brazil) Paulinho McLaren	23
1992	Paulista	7th	32	11	12	9	44	35	34	—	Supercopa Sudamericana	1R	—		(Brazil) Guga	20
1992	Brasileirão	7th	25	8	10	7	30	27	26	—	Supercopa Sudamericana	1R	—		(Brazil) Guga	20
1993	Paulista	6th	36	18	8	10	65	56	44	—	Supercopa Sudamericana	1R	Torneio Rio – São Paulo	2nd	(Brazil) Guga (Note: Top scorer in the Brasileirão tournament (15 goals))	30
1993	Brasileirão	5th	20	9	7	4	24	26	25	—	Supercopa Sudamericana	1R	Torneio Rio – São Paulo	2nd	(Brazil) Guga	30
1994	Paulista	4th	30	11	12	7	37	34	34	—	Supercopa Sudamericana	1R	—		(Brazil) Guga (Note: Top scorer in the Paulista tournament (24 goals))	25
1994	Brasileirão	9th	25	13	5	7	36	22	31	—	Supercopa Sudamericana	1R	—		(Brazil) Guga	25
1995	Paulista	6th	36	14	13	9	59	44	55	—	Supercopa Sudamericana	1R	—		(Brazil) Giovanni	40
1995	Brasileirão	2nd	27	15	5	7	52	40	50	—	Supercopa Sudamericana	1R	—		(Brazil) Giovanni	40
1996	Paulista	5th	30	16	3	11	69	54	51	2R	Supercopa Sudamericana	SF	—		(Brazil) Giovanni	25
1996	Brasileirão	20th	23	7	9	10	26	31	30	2R	Supercopa Sudamericana	SF	—		(Brazil) Giovanni	25
1997	Paulista	3rd	26	14	7	5	52	28	49	2R	Supercopa Sudamericana	GS	Torneio Rio – São Paulo	1st	(Brazil) Macedo	18
1997	Brasileirão	7th	31	14	6	11	48	43	48	2R	Supercopa Sudamericana	GS	Torneio Rio – São Paulo	1st	(Brazil) Macedo	18
1998	Paulista	6th	10	4	2	4	23	14	14	SF	Copa CONMEBOL	W	Torneio Rio – São Paulo	3rd	(Brazil) Viola (Note: Top scorer in the Brasileirão tournament (21 goals)) (Note: Top scorer in the Copa CONMEBOL tournament (4 goals))	34
1998	Brasileirão	3rd	29	14	9	6	55	37	51	SF	Copa CONMEBOL	W	Torneio Rio – São Paulo	3rd	(Brazil) Viola	34
1999	Paulista	3rd	18	10	4	4	40	25	34	2R	—		Torneio Rio – São Paulo	2nd	(Brazil) Viola	18
1999	Brasileirão	11th	21	8	6	7	25	26	30	2R	—		Torneio Rio – São Paulo	2nd	(Brazil) Viola	18
2000	Paulista	2nd	20	9	7	4	34	24	34	SF	—		Torneio Rio – São Paulo	7th	(Brazil) Dodô	27
2000	Brasileirão	14th	24	9	6	9	38	31	33	SF	—		Torneio Rio – São Paulo	7th	(Brazil) Dodô	27
2001	Paulista	3rd	17	9	2	6	39	27	29	2R	—		Torneio Rio – São Paulo	3rd	(Brazil) Dodô	14
2001	Brasileirão	15th	27	9	9	9	37	32	36	2R	—		Torneio Rio – São Paulo	3rd	(Brazil) Dodô	14
2002	Brasileirão	1st	31	16	6	9	59	41	54	2R	—		Torneio Rio – São Paulo	9th	(Brazil) Diego	13
2003	Paulista	8th	6	3	1	2	12	9	10	—	Copa Libertadores	RU	—		(Brazil) Ricardo Oliveira (Note: Top scorer in the Copa Libertadores tournament (9 goals))	20
2003	Brasileirão	2nd	46	25	12	9	93	60	87	—	Copa Sudamericana	QF	—		(Brazil) Ricardo Oliveira	20
2004	Paulista	3rd	13	7	4	2	31	20	27	—	Copa Libertadores	QF	Copa Paulista	W	(Brazil) Robinho	32
2004	Brasileirão	1st	46	27	8	11	103	58	89	—	Copa Sudamericana	QF	Copa Paulista	W	(Brazil) Robinho	32
2005	Paulista	3rd	19	10	7	2	38	21	37	—	Copa Libertadores	QF	Copa Paulista	1R	(Brazil) Robinho	24
2005	Brasileirão	10th	42	16	11	15	68	71	59	—	Copa Sudamericana	1R	Copa Paulista	1R	(Brazil) Robinho	24
2006	Paulista	1st	19	14	1	4	33	19	43	QF	Copa Sudamericana	R16	—		(Brazil) Reinaldo	11
2006	Brasileirão	4th	38	18	10	10	58	36	64	QF	Copa Sudamericana	R16	—		(Brazil) Reinaldo	11
2007	Paulista	1st	23	17	4	3	47	21	55	—	Copa Libertadores	SF	—		(Brazil) Marcos Aurélio	18
2007	Brasileirão	2nd	38	19	5	14	57	47	62	—	Copa Libertadores	SF	—		(Brazil) Marcos Aurélio	18
2008	Paulista	7th	19	9	4	6	28	23	31	—	Copa Libertadores	QF	—		(Brazil) Kléber Pereira (Note: Top scorer in the Brasileirão tournament (21 goals))	41
2008	Brasileirão	15th	38	11	12	15	44	53	45	—	Copa Libertadores	QF	—		(Brazil) Kléber Pereira	41
2009	Paulista	2nd	23	13	5	5	34	23	44	2R	—		—		(Brazil) Kléber Pereira	24
2009	Brasileirão	12th	38	12	13	13	58	58	49	2R	—		—		(Brazil) Kléber Pereira	24
2010 ^{†}	Paulista	1st	23	18	2	3	72	31	56	W	Copa Sudamericana	2R	—		(Brazil) Neymar (Note: Top scorer in the Copa do Brasil tournament (11 goals))	43
2010 ^{†}	Brasileirão	8th	38	15	11	12	63	50	56	W	Copa Sudamericana	2R	—		(Brazil) Neymar	43
2011 ^{‡}	Paulista	1st	23	14	6	3	45	21	48	—	Copa Libertadores	W	FIFA Club World Cup	RU	(Brazil) Borges (Note: Top scorer in the Série A tournament (23 goals)) (Brazil) Neymar	24
2011 ^{‡}	Brasileirão	10th	38	15	8	15	55	55	53	—	Copa Libertadores	W	FIFA Club World Cup	RU	(Brazil) Borges (Brazil) Neymar	24
2012 ^{‡}	Paulista	1st	23	16	3	4	58	21	51	—	Copa Libertadores	SF	Recopa Sudamericana	W	(Brazil) Neymar (Note: Top scorer in the Paulistão tournament (20 goals)) (Note: Top scorer in the Libertadores tournament (8 goals))	43
2012 ^{‡}	Brasileirão	8th	38	13	14	11	50	44	53	—	Copa Libertadores	SF	Recopa Sudamericana	W	(Brazil) Neymar	43
2013	Paulista	2nd	23	11	9	3	39	26	42	R16	—		—		(Brazil) Cícero	24
2013	Brasileirão	7th	38	15	12	11	51	38	57	R16	—		—		(Brazil) Cícero	24
2014	Paulista	2nd	19	14	3	2	47	19	45	SF	—		—		(Brazil) Gabriel (Note: Top scorer in the Copa do Brasil tournament (6 goals))	21
2014	Brasileirão	9th	38	15	8	15	42	35	53	SF	—		—		(Brazil) Gabriel	21
2015	Paulista	1st	19	13	4	2	36	15	43	2nd	—		—		(Brazil) Ricardo Oliveira (Note: Top scorer in the Paulistão tournament (11 goals)) (Note: Top scorer in the Brasileirão tournament (20 goals)) (Note: Gabriel was also the top scorer in the Copa do Brasil tournament (8 goals))	37
2015	Brasileirão	7th	38	16	10	12	59	41	58	2nd	—		—		(Brazil) Ricardo Oliveira	37
2016	Paulista	1st	19	12	6	1	34	17	42	QF	—		—		(Brazil) Ricardo Oliveira	22
2016	Brasileirão	2nd	38	22	5	11	59	35	71	QF	—		—		(Brazil) Ricardo Oliveira	22
2017	Paulista	5th	14	8	1	5	24	14	25	QF	Copa Libertadores	QF	—		(Brazil) Bruno Henrique	18
2017	Brasileirão	3rd	38	17	12	9	42	32	63	QF	Copa Libertadores	QF	—		(Brazil) Bruno Henrique	18
2018	Paulista	4th	16	6	5	5	19	15	23	QF	Copa Libertadores	R16	—		(Brazil) Gabriel (Note: Top scorer in the Copa do Brasil tournament (4 goals)) (Note: Top scorer in the Brasileirão tournament (18 goals))	27
2018	Brasileirão	10th	38	13	11	14	46	40	50	QF	Copa Libertadores	R16	—		(Brazil) Gabriel	27
2019	Paulista	4th	16	9	3	4	23	15	30	R16	Copa Sudamericana	1R	—		(Uruguay) Carlos Sánchez	19
2019	Brasileirão	2nd	38	22	8	8	60	33	74	R16	Copa Sudamericana	1R	—		(Uruguay) Carlos Sánchez	19
2020	Paulista	8th	13	4	4	5	14	15	16	R16	Copa Libertadores	RU	—		(Brazil) Marinho	24
2020	Brasileirão	8th	38	14	12	12	52	51	54	R16	Copa Libertadores	RU	—		(Brazil) Marinho	24
2021	Paulista	13th	12	3	4	5	12	19	13	QF	Copa Libertadores	GS	—		(Brazil) Marinho	9
2021	Brasileirão	10th	38	12	14	12	35	40	50	QF	Copa Sudamericana	QF	—		(Brazil) Marinho	9
2022	Paulista	13th	12	3	5	4	16	19	14	R16	Copa Sudamericana	R16	—		(Brazil) Marcos Leonardo	21
2022	Brasileirão	12th	38	12	11	15	44	41	47	R16	Copa Sudamericana	R16	—		(Brazil) Marcos Leonardo	21
2023	Paulista	12th	12	3	5	4	14	17	14	R16	Copa Sudamericana	GS	—		(Brazil) Marcos Leonardo	21
2023	Brasileirão	17th	38	11	10	17	39	64	43	R16	Copa Sudamericana	GS	—		(Brazil) Marcos Leonardo	21
2024	Paulista	2nd	16	10	2	4	22	13	32	—	—		—		(Brazil) Giuliano (Brazil) Guilherme	12
2024	Série B	1st	38	20	8	10	57	32	68	—	—		—		(Brazil) Giuliano (Brazil) Guilherme	12
2025	Paulista	4th	14	6	3	5	23	16	21	3R	—		—		(Brazil) Guilherme	14
2025	Série A	12th	38	12	11	15	45	50	47	3R	—		—		(Brazil) Guilherme	14
2026	Paulista										Copa Sudamericana		—			
2026	Brasileirão										Copa Sudamericana		—			
