= 1942 São Paulo FC season =

São Paulo
1942 season
- Chairman: Décio Pacheco Pedroso
- Manager: Vicente Feola; Conrad Ross
- Campeonato Paulista: 3rd

The 1942 football season was São Paulo's 13th season since the club's founding in 1930.

== Overall ==
Games played	34 (20 Campeonato Paulista, 14 Friendly match)
Games won	19 (15 Campeonato Paulista, 4 Friendly match)
Games drawn	7 (2 Campeonato Paulista, 5 Friendly match)
Games lost	8 (3 Campeonato Paulista, 5 Friendly match)
Goals scored	104
Goals conceded	52
Goal difference	+52
Best result	8–1 (H) v Ypiranga - Campeonato Paulista - 1942.08.21
Worst result	1–3 (A) v Fluminense - Friendly match - 1942.10.31; 1–3 (A) v Palmeiras - Campeonato Paulista - 1942.09.20
Most appearances	
Top scorer	

Source: São Paulo FC

== Friendlies ==
January 4 National	São Paulo	0–2	America-RJ	São Paulo
			Goal	Stadium: Estádio Paulo Machado de Carvalho (Pacaembu)

April 18 National	São Paulo	4–0	Portuguesa Santista	São Paulo
	Goal			Stadium: Estádio Paulo Machado de Carvalho (Pacaembu)

June 24 National	São Paulo	5–1	Ypiranga	São Paulo
	Goal		Goal	Stadium: Estádio Paulo Machado de Carvalho (Pacaembu)

June 28 National	Inter de Bebedouro	1–2	São Paulo	Bebedouro
	Goal		Goal

July 5 Taça Cidade de São Paulo	Corinthians	2–1	São Paulo	São Paulo
	Goal		Goal	Stadium: Estádio Paulo Machado de Carvalho (Pacaembu)

July 9 Taça Cidade de São Paulo	Palestra de São Paulo	0–1	São Paulo	São Paulo
			Goal	Stadium: Estádio Paulo Machado de Carvalho (Pacaembu)

October 28 National	São Paulo	3–3	Flamengo	São Paulo
	Goal		Goal	Stadium: Estádio Paulo Machado de Carvalho (Pacaembu)

October 31 National	Fluminense	3–1	São Paulo	Rio de Janeiro
	Goal		Goal	Stadium: Estádio Manoel Schwartz (das Laranjeiras)

November 7 National	São Paulo	3–3	Botafogo	São Paulo
	Goal		Goal	Stadium: Estádio Paulo Machado de Carvalho (Pacaembu)

November 11 International	São Paulo (Brazil)	1–2	(Paraguay) Libertad	São Paulo
	Goal		Goal	Stadium: Estádio Paulo Machado de Carvalho (Pacaembu)

=== Torneio Quinela de Ouro ===
March 7 Taça Supremacia	Corinthians	3–3	São Paulo	São Paulo
	Goal		Goal	Stadium: Estádio Paulo Machado de Carvalho (Pacaembu)

March 14 Taça Supremacia	São Paulo	1–1	Palestra Itália	São Paulo
	Goal		Goal	Stadium: Estádio Paulo Machado de Carvalho (Pacaembu)

March 18 Taça Supremacia	São Paulo	1–2	Flamengo	São Paulo
	Goal		Goal	Stadium: Estádio Paulo Machado de Carvalho (Pacaembu)

March 25 Taça Supremacia	São Paulo	1–1	Fluminense	São Paulo
	Goal		Goal	Stadium: Estádio Paulo Machado de Carvalho (Pacaembu)

== Official competitions ==
=== Campeonato Paulista ===
March 29	São Paulo	7–1	Comercial	São Paulo
	Goal		Goal	Stadium: Estádio Paulo Machado de Carvalho (Pacaembu)

April 5	São Paulo	4–1	Juventus	São Paulo
	Goal		Goal	Stadium: Estádio Paulo Machado de Carvalho (Pacaembu)

April 14	São Paulo	6–1	São Paulo Railway	São Paulo
	Goal		Goal	Stadium: Estádio Paulo Machado de Carvalho (Pacaembu)

April 26	São Paulo	4–1	Ypiranga	São Paulo
	Goal		Goal	Stadium: Estádio Paulo Machado de Carvalho (Pacaembu)

May 1	São Paulo	4–1	Espanha	São Paulo
	Goal		Goal	Stadium: Estádio Paulo Machado de Carvalho (Pacaembu)

May 10	São Paulo	4–2	Portuguesa	São Paulo
	Goal		Goal	Stadium: Estádio Paulo Machado de Carvalho (Pacaembu)

May 24	Corinthians	3–3	São Paulo	São Paulo
	Goal		Goal	Stadium: Estádio Paulo Machado de Carvalho (Pacaembu)

May 31	São Paulo	4–2	Santos	São Paulo
	Goal		Goal	Stadium: Estádio Paulo Machado de Carvalho (Pacaembu)

June 14	São Paulo	1–2	Palestra Itália	São Paulo
	Goal		Goal	Stadium: Estádio Paulo Machado de Carvalho (Pacaembu)

June 20	São Paulo	4–2	Portuguesa Santista	São Paulo
	Goal		Goal	Stadium: Estádio Paulo Machado de Carvalho (Pacaembu)

July 19	São Paulo	2–2	São Paulo Railway	São Paulo
	Goal		Goal	Stadium: Estádio Paulo Machado de Carvalho (Pacaembu)

July 26	São Paulo	4–1	Portuguesa Santista	São Paulo
	Goal		Goal	Stadium: Estádio Paulo Machado de Carvalho (Pacaembu)

August 2	Santos	1–5	São Paulo	Santos
	Goal		Goal	Stadium: Estádio Urbano Caldeira (Vila Belmiro)

August 9	Juventus	1–4	São Paulo	São Paulo
	Goal		Goal	Stadium: Estádio Conde Rodolfo Crespi (Rua Javari)

August 21	São Paulo	8–1	Ypiranga	São Paulo
	Goal		Goal	Stadium: Estádio Paulo Machado de Carvalho (Pacaembu)

August 30	São Paulo	4–2	Corinthians	São Paulo
	Goal		Goal	Stadium: Estádio Paulo Machado de Carvalho (Pacaembu)

September 8	São Paulo	4–0	Comercial	São Paulo
	Goal			Stadium: Estádio Paulo Machado de Carvalho (Pacaembu)

September 13	Portuguesa	1–4	São Paulo	São Paulo
	Goal		Goal	Stadium: Estádio Paulo Machado de Carvalho (Pacaembu)

September 20	Palmeiras	3–1	São Paulo	São Paulo
	Goal		Goal	Stadium: Estádio Paulo Machado de Carvalho (Pacaembu)

September 27	Espanha	W–O	São Paulo	Santos
				Stadium: Estádio Ulrico Mursa

==== Record ====
Final Position	Points	Matches	Wins	Draws	Losses	Goals For	Goals Away	Win%
3rd	32	20	15	2	3	77	28	80%
