= 1951 Campeonato Paulista =

Campeonato Paulista
- Season: 1951
- Champions: Corinthians
- Matches played: 210
- Goals scored: 806 (3.84 per match)
- Top goalscorer: Carbone (Corinthians) – 30 goals
- Biggest home win: Corinthians 9-2 Comercial (June 23, 1951)
- Biggest away win: Comercial 1-6 Santos (June 16, 1951); Jabaquara 0-5 XV de Piracicaba (July 29, 1951); Ypiranga 2-7 Ponte Preta (August 28, 1951); Radium 1-6 Palmeiras (December 2, 1951); Comercial 1-6 São Paulo (December 9, 1951)
- Highest scoring: Corinthians 9-2 Comercial (June 23, 1951)

The 1951 Campeonato Paulista da Primeira Divisão, organized by the Federação Paulista de Futebol, was the 50th season of São Paulo's top professional football league. Corinthians won the title for the 13th time. No teams were relegated. Corinthians's Carbone was the top scorer with 30 goals.

== Championship ==
The championship was disputed in a double-round robin system, with the team with the most points winning the title.

Pos	Team	Pld	W	D	L	GF	GA	GD	Pts	Qualification or relegation
1	Corinthians	28	24	2	2	103	38	+65	50	Champions
2	Palmeiras	28	20	3	5	74	31	+43	43	
3	Portuguesa	28	19	4	5	88	40	+48	42	
4	Santos	28	16	5	7	69	40	+29	37	
5	São Paulo	28	17	3	8	46	34	+12	37	
6	Guarani	28	13	4	11	52	54	−2	30	
7	Ponte Preta	28	8	10	10	52	51	+1	26	
8	Radium	28	9	5	14	45	61	−16	23	
9	Portuguesa Santista	28	8	6	14	38	56	−18	22	
10	Comercial	28	9	3	16	41	82	−41	21	
11	Juventus	28	7	6	15	45	72	−27	20	
12	XV de Piracicaba	28	7	5	16	48	51	−3	19	
13	Nacional	28	5	9	14	42	60	−18	19	
14	Ypiranga	28	6	5	17	33	63	−30	17	
15	Jabaquara	28	5	4	19	32	75	−43	14	Relegation Playoffs

Updated to match(es) played on January 27, 1952. Source: RSSSF.com
Rules for classification: 1) points; 2) goal difference; 3) wins; 4) head-to-head points.

== Results ==
Home/Away	COM	COR	GUA	JAB	JUV	NAC	PAL	PON	POR	PSA	RAD	SAN	SAO	XVP	YPI
Comercial		1-3	2-1	3-1	2-2	1-0	0-2	1-3	1-6	3-2	2-0	1-6	1-6	3-1	0-2
Corinthians	9-2		4-0	7-1	3-0	3-0	3-1	3-1	3-3	1-1	5-2	4-1	4-0	5-2	3-2
Guarani	4-1	0-4		2-0	3-1	8-2	1-5	2-2	3-3	2-0	4-2	0-1	2-0	1-1	3-1
Jabaquara	2-3	2-4	2-1		1-2	3-1	2-1	2-2	2-2	1-0	1-3	0-3	0-1	0-5	0-1
Juventus	2-3	2-7	1-2	4-3		3-1	3-4	2-2	2-5	0-2	4-3	0-4	2-1	3-2	2-5
Nacional	3-3	2-3	0-0	1-2	1-1		0-0	5-1	1-2	3-3	1-1	2-1	0-1	3-2	2-2
Palmeiras	3-0	3-2	0-1	7-1	3-0	5-1		2-2		7-1	3-2	3-2	3-0	1-0	1-1
Ponte Preta	3-1	0-1	1-2	2-2	1-1	2-2	3-1		0-3	3-0	0-1	3-1	1-1	1-2	3-0
Portuguesa	6-1	7-3	7-1	3-0	3-0	4-3	0-1	1-1		3-2	5-3	1-4	4-1	2-0	5-0
Portuguesa Santista	2-1	0-4	3-2	1-1	3-3	0-1	0-3	4-2	2-1		0-1	1-3	0-0	1-0	2-0
Radium	1-2	0-1	2-1	3-1	2-1	3-2	1-6	1-1	1-2	3-3		1-2	1-3	1-0	2-0
Santos	1-1	2-4	7-2	3-1	1-1	2-2	1-2	5-2	0-2	2-1	5-1		3-0	2-1	3-1
São Paulo	3-0	1-4	1-0	4-0	3-1	2-1	1-0	2-0	2-1	2-1	2-0	1-2		2-0	4-2
XV de Piracicaba	6-1	2-3	0-1	5-1	1-2	1-0	2-3	1-4	2-3	4-1	2-2	1-1	1-1		2-2
Ypiranga	1-2	0-3	1-3	1-0	1-0	1-2	1-3	2-7	0-4	1-2	2-2	1-1	0-1	1-2	

=== Relegation Playoffs ===
The regulation stipulated that the last-placed team of the championship should dispute a best-of-four points series against the champions of the Second Level. After one win for each side in the first two matches, XV de Jaú and Jabaquara faced off in neutral ground for the third match of the series. After XV de Jaú scored the match's only goal, Jabaquara's players abandoned the pitch claiming that the goal had been irregular. This sparked a lengthy court battle that delayed the start of the championship of the next year, and ended with Jabaquara's relegation being cancelled.

3 February 1952 Playouts	XV de Jaú	5 – 0	Jabaquara	Estádio Artur Simões, Jaú
	Américo Murollo 15' 27' 46'; Gino 17'; Itamar 24'			Referee: Jorge Miguel

10 February 1952 Playouts	Jabaquara	2 – 0	XV de Jaú	Estádio Ulrico Mursa, Santos
	Barbui 40'; Alemão 67'			Referee: Dante Rossi

16 February 1952 Playouts	XV de Jaú	1 – 0	Jabaquara	Estádio Moisés Lucarelli, Campinas
	Guanxuma 51'			Referee: Dante Rossi

== Top Scores ==
Rank	Player	Club	Goals
1	Carbone	Corintians	30
2	Julinho	Portuguesa	24
2	Baltazar	Corintians	24
4	Pinga	Portuguesa	22
5	Odair	Santos	18
6	Cláudio	Corinthians	17
7	Francisco Rodrígues	Palmeiras	15
7	Tite	Santos	15
9	Gatão	XV de Piracicaba	14
10	Luizinho	Corinthians	13
10	Augusto	Guaraní	13
