= 1950 Campeonato Paulista =

Campeonato Paulista
- Season: 1950
- Champions: Palmeiras
- Matches played: 132
- Goals scored: 469 (3.55 per match)
- Top goalscorer: Pinga (Portuguesa) – 22 goals
- Biggest home win: São Paulo 10-0 Guarani (November 11, 1950)
- Biggest away win: Santos 1-6 Portuguesa (December 3, 1950)
- Highest scoring: Portuguesa 9-2 Jabaquara (December 23, 1950)

The 1950 Campeonato Paulista da Primeira Divisão, organized by the Federação Paulista de Futebol, was the 49th season of São Paulo's top professional football league. Palmeiras won the title for the 12th time. No teams were relegated. Portuguesa's Pinga was the top scorer with 22 goals.

== Championship ==
The championship was disputed in a double-round robin system, with the team with the most points winning the title. Originally, the team with the fewest points would be relegated, but the last-placed team of that year, Jabaquara, appealed to the sports courts, alleging that since it was one of FPF's founding members, the federation rules allowed the club to never be relegated. as a consequence, fellow founding members Comercial, that had been relegated in the previous year and had failed to be promoted, found itself invited back into the First Level.

Pos	Team	Pld	W	D	L	GF	GA	GD	Pts	Qualification or relegation
1	Palmeiras	22	13	6	3	45	22	+23	32	Champions
2	São Paulo	22	13	5	4	54	26	+28	31	
3	Santos	22	13	5	4	47	34	+13	31	
4	Portuguesa	22	13	3	6	67	36	+31	29	
5	Corinthians	22	10	8	4	47	34	+13	28	
6	Guarani	22	9	5	8	34	41	−7	23	
7	Ypiranga	22	9	1	12	33	40	−7	19	
8	Juventus	22	7	4	11	35	45	−10	18	
9	XV de Piracicaba	22	6	5	11	30	40	−10	17	
10	Portuguesa Santista	22	6	4	12	34	39	−5	16	
11	Nacional	22	4	4	14	20	55	−35	12	
12	Jabaquara	22	3	2	17	23	57	−34	8	

Updated to match(es) played on January 28, 1951. Source: RSSSF.com
Rules for classification: 1) points; 2) goal difference; 3) wins; 4) head-to-head points.

== Results ==
Home/Away	COR	GUA	JAB	JUV	NAC	PAL	POR	PORT	SAN	SAO	XVP	YPI
Corinthians		3-1	3-0	2-2	2-0	3-1	3-2	4-3	2-2	1-1	1-0	4-3
Guarani	0-0					0-4			4-2			
Jabaquara	3-2					0-2			1-2			
Juventus	2-2					1-3			0-0			
Nacional	1-1					0-6			1-4			
Palmeiras	2-2	1-1	1-0	3-1	4-1		2-1	1-1	2-4	2-0	1-0	0-0
Portuguesa	3-6					3-1			3-2			
Portuguesa Santista	2-2					0-3			0-1			
Santos	2-1	1-1	1-0	4-2	5-0	1-1	1-6	1-0		3-2	5-2	2-1
São Paulo	1-0					1-1			1-2			
XV de Piracicaba	2-1					1-2			2-2			
Ypiranga	1-2					1-2			2-0			

== Top Scores ==
Rank	Player	Club	Goals
1	Pinga	Portuguesa	22
2	Odair	Santos	18
2	Baltazar	Corinthians	18
4	China	Guaraní	16
5	Francisco Rodrígues	Palmeiras	14
6	Nininho	Portuguesa	13
7	Leopoldo	São Paulo	10
7	Carbone	Juventus	10
