= Choque-Rei =

Brazilian association football rivalry

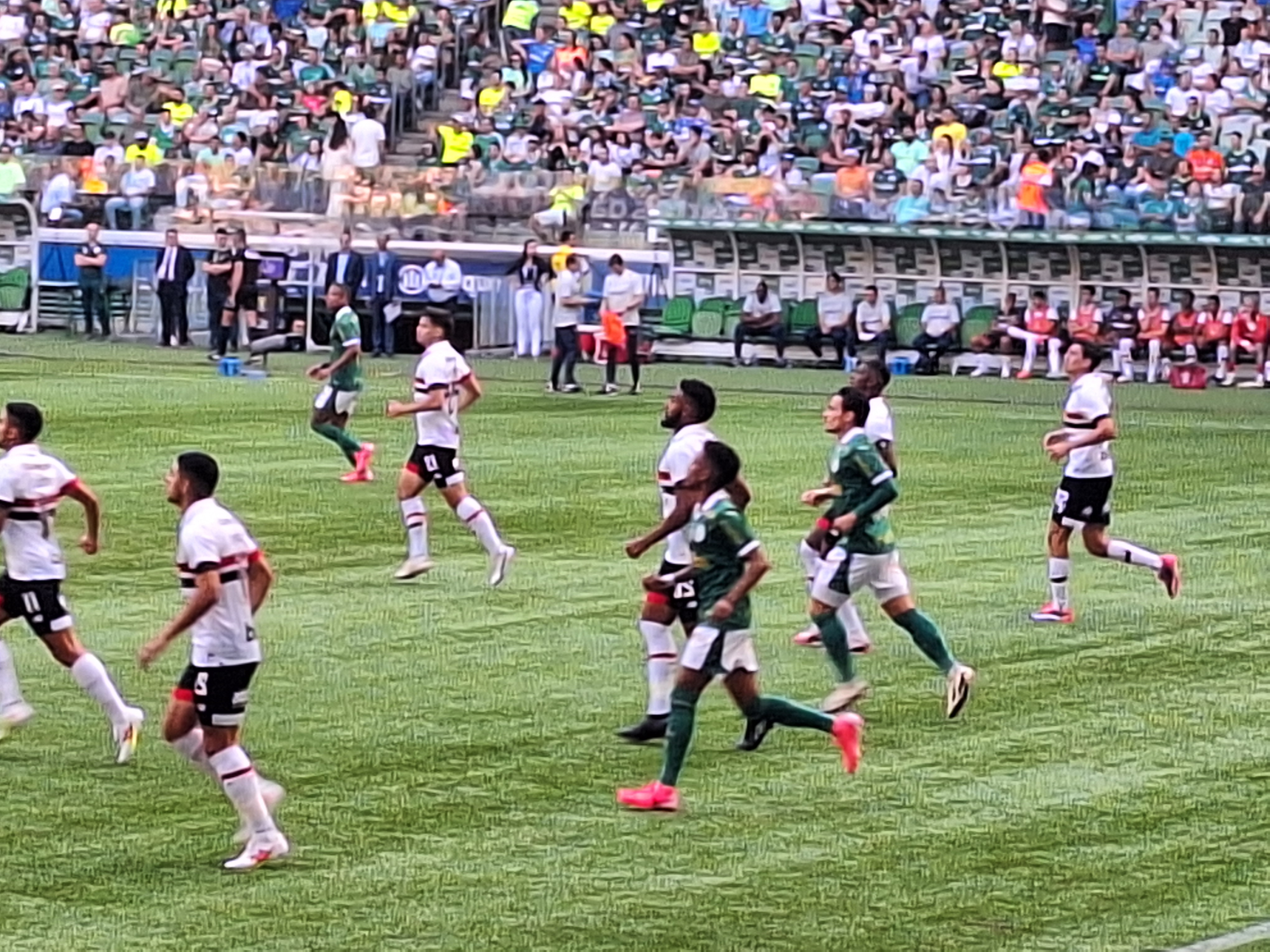
- A Choque-Rei match in 2024

- Palmeiras São Paulo
- Location: São Paulo, Brazil
- First meeting: 30 March 1930; Campeonato Paulista; São Paulo 2–2 Palestra Itália
- Latest meeting: 12 September 2026; Brazil Série A Palmeiras 2–0 São Paulo
- Stadiums: Nubank Parque (Palmeiras); Morumbi (São Paulo)

Statistics
- Total meetings: 356
- Most player appearances: Rogério Ceni (58)
- Top scorer: Müller (15)
- All-time series: Palmeiras: 124; Drawn: 116; São Paulo: 116
- Largest victory: Palmeiras 0–6 São Paulo; Campeonato Paulista; 26 March 1939

The Choque-Rei (English: Clash of Kings) is the name given to Palmeiras and São Paulo football rivalry matches. It is contested between two very big, classic football clubs of the city of São Paulo, Brazil. The derby dates back to 1930. The tension between both clubs and fanbases is extremely fierce, and it is considered one of the biggest derbies in Brazilian football.

Palmeiras has the edge in head-to-head statistics, with 124 wins against 116 from São Paulo and other 116 draws, making for a balanced encounter. In Campeonato Brasileiro Série A matches, Palmeiras has a large advantage with 32 wins, while São Paulo won 17, and other 33 matches ended in a draw. São Paulo, however, has a notable supremacy in knockout encounters, having won 17 of 24 series between the two.

The two teams have their training centers separated by only a wall, which is nicknamed by many as the "Berlin Wall".

== History ==
The first meeting between São Paulo and Palmeiras (at the time called Palestra Itália) began in the 1930 Campeonato Paulista, with a 2–2 draw. The rivalry blossomed in the 1940s, because between 1942 and 1950, São Paulo and Palmeiras were state protagonists. São Paulo won five Campeonato Paulista titles (1943, 1945, 1946, 1948 and 1949), while Palmeiras won four (1942, 1944, 1947 and 1950). At that time, the rivalry between the two teams was responsible for bringing crowds to the stadiums. The magnitude of the duel caused journalist Thomaz Mazzoni, from the newspaper A Gazeta Esportiva, to highlight the rivalry as "Choque-Rei" (Clash of Kings).

== Statistics ==
As of 12 September 2026

Type	Competition	Palmeiras wins	Draws	São Paulo wins
Continental	Copa Libertadores	1	3	6
National	Campeonato Brasileiro Série A	32	33	17
National	Copa do Brasil	1	0	5
National	Supercopa do Brasil	0	1	0
National	Torneio Heleno Nunes	1	0	0
Inter-state	Torneio Rio–São Paulo	10	7	7
State	Campeonato Paulista	62	54	70
State	Supercampeonato Paulista	0	1	1
Other matches		17	17	10
Total		124	116	116

Total goals in all competitions:

- Palmeiras goals: 468
- São Paulo goals: 448

Total goals in Campeonato Brasileiro:

- Palmeiras goals: 108
- São Paulo goals: 82

=== Largest wins ===
Palmeiras largest wins:

- Palmeiras 5–0 São Paulo (19 May 1965, Pacaembu; Torneio Rio–São Paulo)
- Palmeiras 5–0 São Paulo (25 October 2023, Nubank Parque; Campeonato Brasileiro)

São Paulo largest win:

- Palestra Itália 0–6 São Paulo (26 March 1939, Antarctica Paulista; Campeonato Paulista)

=== Largest attendances ===
- Attendance: 115,000 (Palmeiras 0–1 São Paulo; 27 June 1971, Morumbi; Campeonato Paulista)
- Attendance: 112,016 (Palmeiras 0–0 São Paulo; 17 June 1979, Morumbi; Campeonato Paulista)

== List of matches ==
=== National league ===
Palmeiras v São Paulo
Date	Venue	Score	Competition
6 May 1967	Pacaembu	1–1	Torneio Roberto G. Pedrosa
12 October 1968	Morumbi	1–1	Torneio Roberto G. Pedrosa
22 November 1972	Pacaembu	0–0	Campeonato Nacional
25 November 1973	Morumbi	1–2	Campeonato Nacional
20 February 1974	Morumbi	0–0	Campeonato Nacional
12 June 1974	Pacaembu	1–0	Campeonato Nacional
23 April 1978	Morumbi	0–0	Copa Brasil
3 February 1985	Morumbi	2–2	Taça de Ouro
14 December 1986	Morumbi	2–2	Copa Brasil
26 September 1987	Pacaembu	2–1	Copa Brasil
13 November 1988	Palestra Itália	1–1	Copa Brasil
21 November 1993	Morumbi	1–1	Série A
29 September 1996	Palestra Itália	2–1	Série A
26 July 1998	Pacaembu	2–1	Série A
2 September 2000	Morumbi	0–3	Copa João Havelange
25 November 2000	Pacaembu	1–1	Copa João Havelange
2 October 2002	Pacaembu	1–1	Série A
27 June 2004	Pacaembu	2–1	Série A
12 November 2005	Pacaembu	2–1	Série A
24 September 2006	Prudentão	3–1	Série A
29 August 2007	Palestra Itália	0–1	Série A
19 October 2008	Palestra Itália	2–2	Série A
24 May 2009	Palestra Itália	0–0	Série A
19 September 2010	Pacaembu	0–2	Série A
27 November 2011	Pacaembu	1–0	Série A
15 July 2012	Arena Barueri	1–1	Série A
17 August 2014	Pacaembu	1–2	Série A
28 June 2015	Nubank Parque	4–0	Série A
7 September 2016	Nubank Parque	2–1	Série A
27 August 2017	Nubank Parque	4–2	Série A
2 June 2018	Nubank Parque	3–1	Série A
30 October 2019	Nubank Parque	3–0	Série A
10 October 2020	Nubank Parque	0–2	Série A
17 November 2021	Nubank Parque	0–2	Série A
16 October 2022	Nubank Parque	0–0	Série A
25 October 2023	Nubank Parque	5–0	Série A
18 August 2024	Nubank Parque	2–1	Série A
11 May 2025	Arena Barueri	1–0	Série A
12 September 2026	Nubank Parque	2–0	Série A

São Paulo v Palmeiras
Date	Venue	Score	Competition
5 November 1969	Palestra Itália	2–1	Torneio Roberto G. Pedrosa
20 September 1970	Morumbi	0–2	Torneio Roberto G. Pedrosa
23 October 1971	Morumbi	1–1	Campeonato Nacional
10 December 1972	Morumbi	2–1	Campeonato Nacional
12 October 1975	Morumbi	0–0	Copa Brasil
17 October 1976	Morumbi	1–2	Copa Brasil
6 November 1977	Pacaembu	0–2	Copa Brasil
9 July 1978	Morumbi	1–1	Copa Brasil
16 March 1985	Pacaembu	4–4	Taça de Ouro
2 November 1986	Morumbi	0–0	Copa Brasil
5 November 1989	Morumbi	2–2	Série A
21 October 1990	Morumbi	1–2	Série A
4 April 1991	Morumbi	0–0	Série A
8 March 1992	Morumbi	0–4	Série A
14 December 1993	Morumbi	0–2	Série A
30 October 1994	Morumbi	2–2	Série A
26 November 1995	Morenão	0–2	Série A
7 September 1997	Morumbi	0–2	Série A
3 October 1999	Morumbi	0–0	Série A
30 November 2000	Morumbi	1–2	Copa João Havelange
6 October 2001	Morumbi	0–1	Série A
2 October 2004	Morumbi	2–1	Série A
4 August 2005	Morumbi	3–3	Série A
24 May 2006	Morumbi	4–1	Série A
27 May 2007	Morumbi	0–0	Série A
13 July 2008	Morumbi	2–1	Série A
30 August 2009	Morumbi	0–0	Série A
26 May 2010	Morumbi	1–0	Série A
21 August 2011	Morumbi	1–1	Série A
6 October 2012	Morumbi	3–0	Série A
16 November 2014	Morumbi	2–0	Série A
27 September 2015	Morumbi	1–1	Série A
29 May 2016	Morumbi	1–0	Série A
27 May 2017	Morumbi	2–0	Série A
6 October 2018	Morumbi	0–2	Série A
13 July 2019	Morumbi	1–1	Série A
19 February 2021	Morumbi	1–1	Série A
31 July 2021	Morumbi	1–1	Série A
20 June 2022	Morumbi	1–2	Série A
11 June 2023	Morumbi	0–2	Série A
29 April 2024	Morumbi	0–0	Série A
5 October 2025	Morumbi	2–3	Série A
21 March 2026	Morumbi	0–1	Série A

=== Cup ===
Date	Venue	Score	Competition
24 June 2000	Morumbi	2–1	Copa do Brasil quarterfinal 1st leg
27 June 2000	Palestra Itália	2–3	Copa do Brasil quarterfinal 2nd leg
23 June 2022	Morumbi	1–0	Copa do Brasil round of 16 1st leg
14 July 2022	Nubank Parque	2–1 (Note: São Paulo advanced 4–3 in the penalty shootout.)	Copa do Brasil round of 16 2nd leg
5 July 2023	Morumbi	1–0	Copa do Brasil quarterfinal 1st leg
13 July 2023	Nubank Parque	1–2	Copa do Brasil quarterfinal 2nd leg
4 February 2024	Mineirão	0–0 (Note: São Paulo won 4–2 in the penalty shootout.)	Supercopa do Brasil

=== International competitions ===
Date	Venue	Score	Competition
30 March 1974	Morumbi	2–0	Copa Libertadores group stage
24 April 1974	Palestra Itália	1–2	Copa Libertadores group stage
27 April 1994	Pacaembu	0–0	Copa Libertadores round of 16 1st leg
24 July 1994	Morumbi	2–1	Copa Libertadores round of 16 2nd leg
18 May 2005	Palestra Itália	0–1	Copa Libertadores round of 16 1st leg
25 May 2005	Morumbi	2–0	Copa Libertadores round of 16 2nd leg
26 April 2006	Palestra Itália	1–1	Copa Libertadores round of 16 1st leg
3 May 2006	Morumbi	2–1	Copa Libertadores round of 16 2nd leg
10 August 2021	Morumbi	1–1	Copa Libertadores quarterfinal 1st leg
17 August 2021	Nubank Parque	3–0	Copa Libertadores quarterfinal 2nd leg

== Honours' comparison ==
Competition	Palmeiras	São Paulo
Campeonato Brasileiro Série A	12	6
Copa do Brasil	4	1
Supercopa do Brasil	1	1
Copa dos Campeões	1	—
Copa Libertadores	3	3
Copa Sudamericana	—	1
Recopa Sudamericana	1	2
Supercopa Libertadores	—	1
Copa Mercosur	1	—
Copa CONMEBOL	—	1
Copa Master de CONMEBOL	—	1
Copa Rio International	1	—
FIFA Club World Cup/Intercontinental Cup	—	3
Total	24	20
Other competitions	Palmeiras	São Paulo
Campeonato Paulista	27	22
Supercampeonato Paulista	—	1
Torneio Rio–São Paulo	5	1
Total General	56	44

Note: Although the Intercontinental Cup and the FIFA Club World Cup are officially different tournaments, in Brazil they are treated many times as the same tournament.
