= 1942 in Brazilian football =

Football in Brazil
- Season: 1942

The following article presents a summary of the 1942 football (soccer) season in Brazil, which was the 41st season of competitive football in the country.

== Campeonato Paulista ==
Final Standings

Position	Team	Points	Played	Won	Drawn	Lost	For	Against	Difference
1	Palmeiras	36	20	17	2	1	65	19	46
2	Corinthians	33	20	15	3	2	78	29	49
3	São Paulo	32	20	15	2	3	77	28	49
4	Ypiranga-SP	24	20	10	4	6	55	44	11
5	São Paulo Railway	19	20	8	3	9	48	61	-13
6	Juventus	19	20	9	1	10	42	46	-4
7	Santos	18	20	7	4	9	59	51	8
8	Portuguesa	18	20	8	2	10	44	52	8
9	Portuguesa Santista	10	20	5	0	15	39	60	-21
10	Comercial-SP	7	20	3	1	16	34	94	-60
11	Hespanha	4	20	1	2	17	30	87	-57

Palmeiras declared as the Campeonato Paulista champions.

== State championship champions ==
State	Champion	State	Champion
Acre	-	Paraíba	Ástrea
Alagoas	CSA	Paraná	Coritiba
Amapá	-	Pernambuco	Sport Recife
Amazonas	Nacional	Piauí	Flamengo-PI
Bahia	Galícia	Rio de Janeiro	Royal
Ceará	Ceará	Rio de Janeiro (DF)	Flamengo
Espírito Santo	Rio Branco-ES	Rio Grande do Norte	ABC
Goiás	-	Rio Grande do Sul	Internacional
Maranhão	Sampaio Corrêa	Rondônia	-
Mato Grosso	-	Santa Catarina	Avaí
Minas Gerais	Atlético Mineiro	São Paulo	Palmeiras
Pará	Paysandu	Sergipe	Cotingüiba

== Other competition champions ==
Competition	Champion
Campeonato Brasileiro de Seleções Estaduais	São Paulo
Torneio Quinela de Ouro	Corinthians

== Brazil national team ==
The following table lists all the games played by the Brazil national football team in official competitions and friendly matches during 1942.

Date	Opposition	Result	Score	Brazil scorers	Competition
January 14, 1942	Chile	W	6-1	Pirillo (3), Patesko (2), Cláudio Pinho	South American Championship
January 17, 1942	Argentina	L	1-2	Servílio	South American Championship
January 21, 1942	Peru	W	2-1	Pedro Amorim (2)	South American Championship
January 24, 1942	Uruguay	L	0-1	-	South American Championship
January 31, 1942	Ecuador	W	5-1	Tim, Pirillo (3), Zizinho	South American Championship
February 5, 1942	Paraguay	D	1-1	Zizinho	South American Championship
