= 1949 Campeonato Paulista =

Campeonato Paulista
- Season: 1949
- Champions: São Paulo
- Relegated: Comercial
- Matches played: 132
- Goals scored: 528 (4 per match)
- Top goalscorer: Friaça (São Paulo) – 24 goals
- Biggest home win: XV de Piracicaba 10-1 Nacional (September 11, 1949)
- Biggest away win: Comercial 1-7 Ypiranga (June 26, 1949)
- Highest scoring: XV de Piracicaba 10-1 Nacional (September 11, 1949)

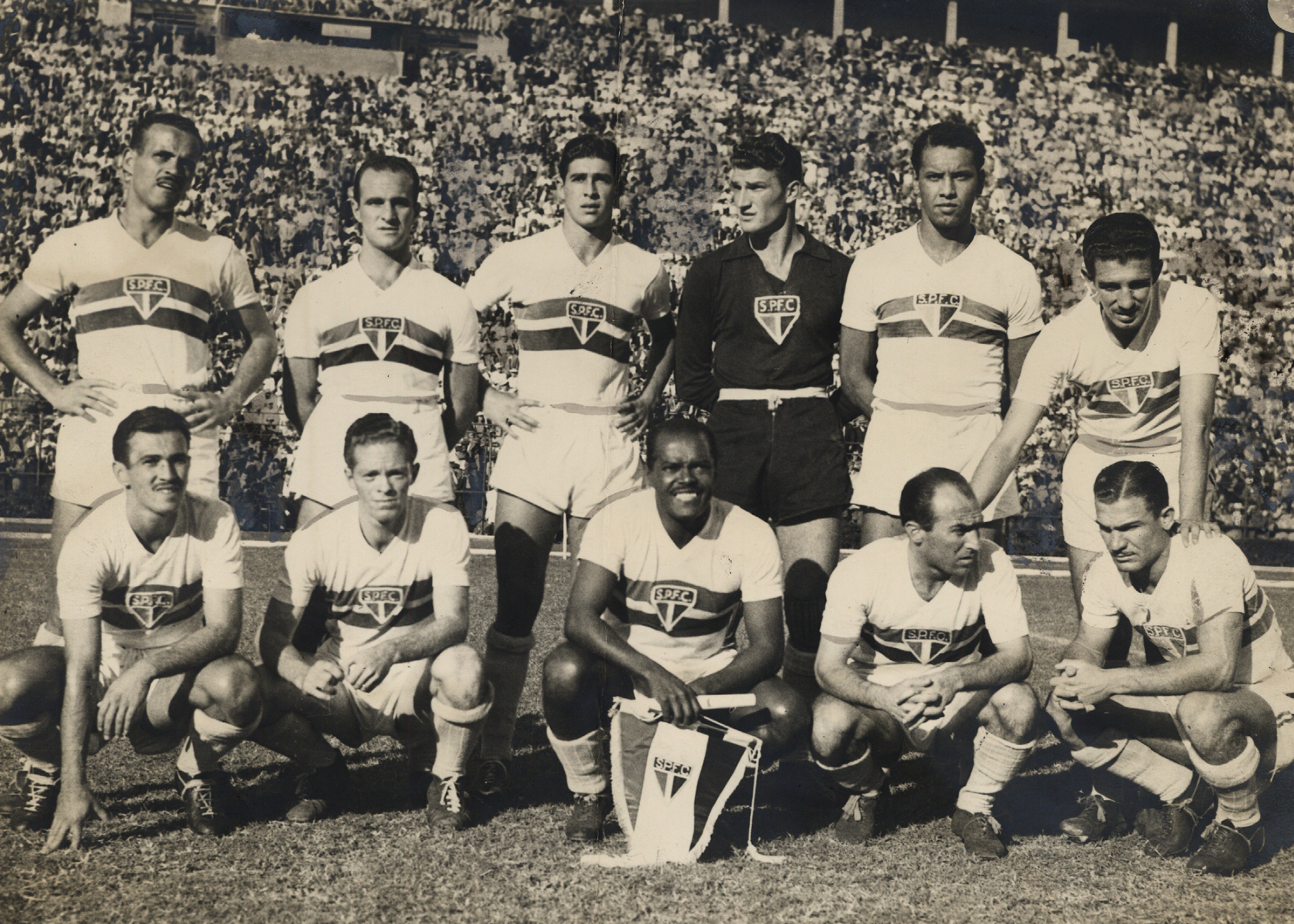
São Paulo winners of the 1949 Campeonato Paulista da Primeira Divisão

The 1949 Campeonato Paulista da Primeira Divisão, organized by the Federação Paulista de Futebol, was the 48th season of São Paulo's top professional football league. São Paulo won the title for the 6th time. Comercial was relegated. The top scorer was São Paulo's Friaça with 24 goals.

== Championship ==
The championship was disputed in a double-round robin system, with the team with the most points winning the title and the team with the fewest points being relegated.

Pos	Team	Pld	W	D	L	GF	GA	GD	Pts	Qualification or relegation
1	São Paulo	22	16	4	2	70	23	+47	36	Champions
2	Palmeiras	22	12	4	6	40	31	+9	28	
3	Portuguesa	22	11	5	6	57	42	+15	27	
4	Santos	22	11	4	7	51	40	+11	26	
5	Corinthians	22	8	8	6	49	37	+12	24	
6	Ypiranga	22	11	2	9	50	42	+8	24	
7	Portuguesa Santista	22	9	5	8	38	32	+6	23	
8	XV de Piracicaba	22	9	4	9	45	44	+1	22	
9	Jabaquara	22	7	3	12	44	53	−9	17	
10	Juventus	22	5	5	12	28	41	−13	15	
11	Nacional	22	5	2	15	27	70	−43	12	
12	Comercial	22	3	4	15	29	63	−34	10	Relegated

Updated to match(es) played on December 11, 1949. Source: RSSSF.com
Rules for classification: 1) points; 2) goal difference; 3) wins; 4) head-to-head points.

== Top Scores ==
Rank	Player	Club	Goals
1	Friaça	São Paulo	24
2	Odair	Santos	17
2	Renato	Portuguesa	17
2	Baltazar	Corinthians	17
5	Pinga	Portuguesa	15
6	Nininho	Portuguesa	14
7	Leônidas	São Paulo	12
8	Gatão	XV de Piracicaba	11
9	Noronha	Corinthians	10
9	Texeirinha	São Paulo	10
9	Leopoldo	São Paulo	10
