= 1914 Santos FC season =

Santos FBC
1914 season
- President: Raymundo Marques; Agnelo Cícero de Oliveira
- Manager: Urbano Caldeira
- Stadium: Avenida Ana Costa Field
- Top goalscorer: League: All: Arnaldo Patusca; Adolpho Millon (4 goals each)

The 1914 season was the third season for Santos Futebol Clube, a Brazilian football club, based in the Vila Belmiro bairro, Zona Intermediária, Santos, Brazil.
