= 1927 Santos FC season =

- President: Antônio Guilherme Gonçalves
- Manager: Urbano Caldeira
- Stadium: Vila Belmiro
- Top goalscorer: League: All: Araken Patusca (53 goals)

The 1927 season was the sixteenth season for Santos FC.

== Squad ==
Note: Flags indicate national team as defined under FIFA eligibility rules; some limited exceptions apply. Players may hold more than one non-FIFA nationality.

No.	Pos.	Nation	Player
—	GK	BRA	
—	DF	BRA	

No.	Pos.	Nation	Player
—	MF	BRA	
—	FW	BRA	

== Friendly matches ==
September 15, 1912 Friendly	Santos FBC	3 - 2	Santos AC	Avenida Ana Costa Field, Santos
	Arnaldo Silveira; Adolpho Millon	Report	Lee	Referee: Rodriguez

SANTOS FBC:
GK	(France) Julien Fauvel
DF	(Brazil) Sidnei
DF	(Brazil) Sebastião Arantes
MF	(Brazil) Ernani
MF	(Brazil) Oscar Bastos
MF	(Brazil) Montenegro
FW	(Brazil) Adolpho Millon Jr.
FW	(Brazil) Hugo
FW	(Brazil) Nilo Arruda
FW	(Brazil) Carlos Ernesto Simon
FW	(Brazil) Arnaldo Silveira
Manager:
None

SANTOS AC:
GK	(England) Parsons
DF	(England) Kent
DF	(England) Deweck
MF	(England) Wood
MF	(England) Seddon
MF	(England) Lee
MF	(England) De Saône
FW	(England) Allen
FW	(Republic of Ireland) V. Cross
FW	(Republic of Ireland) Harold Cross
FW	?
Manager:
?
