= 1958 Campeonato Paulista =

Campeonato Paulista – Série A1
- Season: 1958
- Champions: Santos
- Relegated: Ypiranga
- Taça Brasil: Santos
- Matches played: 380
- Goals scored: 1,329 (3.5 per match)
- Best Player: Pelé (Santos)
- Top goalscorer: Pelé (Santos) – 58 goals
- Biggest home win: Santos 10-0 Nacional (September 11, 1958)
- Biggest away win: Guarani 2-8 Portuguesa (November 30, 1958); Guarani 1-7 Santos (December 14, 1958)
- Highest scoring: Santos 7-3 Jabaquara (July 16, 1958); Santos 10-0 Nacional (September 11, 1958); Santos 9-1 Comercial (November 19, 1958); Guarani 2-8 Portuguesa (November 30, 1958)

The 1958 Campeonato Paulista da Primeira Divisão, organized by the Federação Paulista de Futebol, was the 57th season of São Paulo's top professional football league. Santos won the title for the 4th time. Ypiranga was relegated. For the second consecutive year, the top scorer was Santos's Pelé, with 58 goals.

== Championship ==
The championship was disputed in a double-round robin system, with the team with the most points winning the title and the team with the fewest points being relegated.

Pos	Team	Pld	W	D	L	GF	GA	GD	Pts	Qualification or relegation
1	Santos	38	29	6	3	143	40	+103	64	Champions
2	São Paulo	38	25	10	3	93	39	+54	60	
3	Corinthians	38	24	8	6	93	50	+43	56	
4	Palmeiras	38	22	8	8	82	47	+35	52	
5	XV de Piracicaba	38	17	12	9	66	58	+8	46	
6	Portuguesa	38	19	7	12	96	69	+27	45	
7	Noroeste	38	15	10	13	66	63	+3	40	
8	Botafogo	38	17	5	16	70	53	+17	39	
9	Taubaté	38	14	8	16	58	59	−1	36	
10	Nacional	38	15	6	17	65	79	−14	36	
11	Ferroviária	38	14	7	17	59	57	+2	35	
12	Portuguesa Santista	38	13	9	16	67	68	−1	35	
13	América	38	12	9	17	47	58	−11	33	
14	Ponte Preta	38	11	9	18	48	77	−29	31	
15	Juventus	38	12	7	19	54	84	−30	31	
16	Guarani	38	12	7	19	53	94	−41	31	
17	Comercial	38	8	12	18	44	74	−30	28	
18	XV de Jaú	38	8	7	23	42	76	−34	23	
19	Jabaquara	38	7	7	24	45	84	−39	21	
20	Ypiranga	38	4	10	24	38	100	−62	18	Relegated

Updated to match(es) played on December 20, 1958. Source: RSSSF.com
Rules for classification: 1) points; 2) goal difference; 3) wins; 4) number of goals scored.

== Top Scores ==
Rank	Player	Club	Goals
1	Pelé	Santos	58
2	Pepe	Santos	28
3	Zague	Corinthians	23
4	Gino	São Paulo	20
5	Zé Carlos	Portuguesa	18
6	Amaury	São Paulo	17
6	Paulinho	Palmeiras	17
8	Servílio	Portuguesa	16
9	Tite	Corinthians	15
9	Indio	Corinthians	15
9	Raul Klein	Portuguesa	15
9	Bazzani	Ferroviaría	15
13	Fifi	Guaraní	14
