= 1950 Santos FC season =

Santos FC
1950 season
- President: Athiê Jorge Coury
- Campeonato Paulista: 2nd
- Top goalscorer: League: All: Odair (25 goals)

The 1950 season was the thirty-ninth season for Santos FC.
