= China (footballer, born 1923) =

Brazilian footballer

Personal information
- Full name: José Gonçalves da Silva
- Date of birth: 27 January 1923
- Place of birth: Recife, Brazil
- Position: Forward

Senior career*
Years	Team	Apps	(Gls)
1944–1946	America-RJ		
1946	Fluminense		
1947–1949	São Paulo	64	(35)
1949–1952	Guarani		
1952–1953	Botafogo-SP		
- * Club domestic league appearances and goals

José Gonçalves da Silva (27 January 1923 – ?), better known as China, was a Brazilian professional footballer who played as a forward.

== Career ==
Before coming to São Paulo, China played for Rio de Janeiro-based clubs America-RJ and Fluminense. In São Paulo he won the state championships in 1948 and 1949. It was highlighted by its great speed.

At Guarani, he was hired from São Paulo for the final stretch of the access division in 1949, being fundamental in the victory. He scored 83 goals, being one of the top 15 players with the most goals in the history of for the club.

== Honours ==
São Paulo

- Campeonato Paulista: 1948, 1949

Guarani

- Campeonato Paulista Série A2: 1949
