= 1922 Santos FC season =

- President: Flamínio Levy; Armando Lichti
- Manager: Urbano Caldeira
- Stadium: Vila Belmiro
- Campeonato Paulista: 11th
- Top goalscorer: League: All: Constantino Mollitsas (12)

The 1922 season was the eleventh season for Santos FC.
