= 1949 Santos FC season =

Santos FC
1949 season
- President: Athiê Jorge Coury
- Campeonato Paulista: 4th
- Top goalscorer: League: All: Odair (20 goals)

The 1949 season was the thirty-eighth season for Santos FC.
