= 1928 Santos FC season =

- President: Antônio Guilherme Gonçalves
- Manager: Urbano Caldeira
- Stadium: Vila Belmiro
- Campeonato Paulista (APEA): 2nd
- Top goalscorer: League: All: Araken Patusca (19 goals)

The 1928 season was the seventeenth season for Santos FC.
