= 1925 Santos FC season =

- President: Manoel Oliveira Alfaya; Antônio Guilherme Gonçalves
- Manager: Urbano Caldeira
- Stadium: Vila Belmiro
- Campeonato Paulista: 4th
- Top goalscorer: League: All: Araken Patusca (22 goals)

The 1925 season was the fourteenth season for Santos FC.
