= 1926 Santos FC season =

- President: Antônio Guilherme Gonçalves
- Manager: Urbano Caldeira
- Stadium: Vila Belmiro
- Top goalscorer: League: All: Araken Patusca (25 goals)

The 1926 season was the fifteenth season for Santos FC.
