= 1935 Santos FC season =

- President: Carlos de Barros
- Manager: Caêtano di Domênica; Bilú
- Stadium: Estádio Urbano Caldeira
- Campeonato Paulista (LPF): Champions
- Top goalscorer: League: All: Saci (14 goals)

The 1935 season was the twenty-fourth season for Santos FC.
