= 1923 Santos FC season =

- President: Armando Lichti; Flamínio Levy; Manoel Oliveira Alfaya
- Manager: Urbano Caldeira
- Stadium: Vila Belmiro
- Top goalscorer: League: All: Constantino Mollitsas (9 goals)

The 1923 season was the twelfth season for Santos FC.
