= 1915 Santos FC season =

Santos FC
1915 season
- President: Agnelo Cícero de Oliveira
- Manager: Urbano Caldeira
- Stadium: Avenida Ana Costa Field
- Top goalscorer: League: All: Araken Patusca (16 goals)

The 1915 season was the fourth season for Santos Futebol Clube, a Brazilian football club, based in the Vila Belmiro bairro, Zona Intermediária, Santos, Brazil.
