= 1948 Santos FC season =

Santos FC
1948 season
- President: Athiê Jorge Coury
- Campeonato Paulista: 2nd
- Top goalscorer: League: All: Odair (20 goals)

The 1948 season was the thirty-seventh season for Santos FC.
