= 1913 Santos FC season =

Santos FBC
1913 season
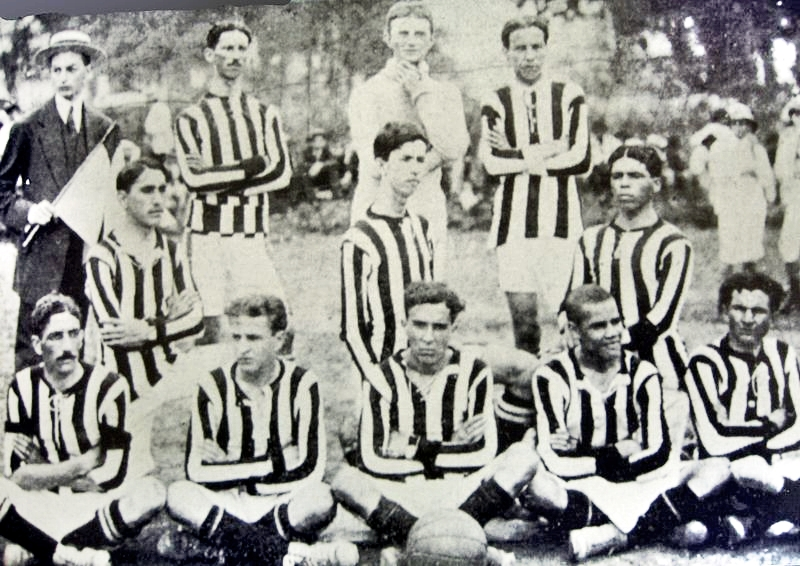
- Santos players in 1913
- President: Sizino Patusca; Raymundo Marques
- Head coach: Urbano Caldeira
- Stadium: Avenida Ana Costa Field
- Campeonato Paulista (LPF): Withdrew
- Campeonato Santista: Winners

The 1913 season was Santos Foot Ball Club's second in existence and the club's first season playing official tournaments. The club played in the Campeonato Santista and in the Campeonato Paulista in that year.

Santos won the Campeonato Santista in that year, finishing the tournament undefeated. In September 1913, the club withdrew from the Campeonato Paulista due to the lack of funds for the trips.

== Players ==
=== Squad ===
Note: Flags indicate national team as defined under FIFA eligibility rules; some limited exceptions apply. Players may hold more than one non-FIFA nationality.

No.	Pos.	Nation	Player
—	GK	BRA	Aníbal
—	GK	BRA	Durval Damasceno
—	GK	FRA	Julien Fauvel
—	GK	BRA	Juvenal
—	DF	BRA	José Pereira da Silva
—	DF	BRA	Pilar
—	DF	BRA	Sebastião Arantes
—	DF	BRA	Sidnei
—	MF	BRA	Ambrosio
—	MF	BRA	Américo
—	MF	BRA	Ernani
—	MF	BRA	Esmeraldo
—	MF	BRA	Eurico

No.	Pos.	Nation	Player
—	MF	BRA	Geraule Ribeiro
—	MF	BRA	Ricardo Pinto
—	MF	BRA	Urbano Caldeira
—	FW	BRA	Adolpho Millon
—	FW	BRA	Anacleto Ferramenta
—	FW	BRA	Arnaldo Silveira
—	FW	EIR	Harold Cross
—	FW	BRA	Machado
—	FW	BRA	Marba
—	FW	BRA	Nilo Arruda
—	FW	SCO	William Paul
—	FW	BRA	Raymundo Marques

== Competitions ==
=== Friendlies ===
==== Matches ====
13 May	São Vicente	0–5	Santos	São Vicente

17 August	São Vicente	1–2	Santos	São Vicente
	Marba		Arnaldo Silveira; Millon

15 November	Santos	4–4	Atlas	Santos
				Stadium: Ana Costa Field; Referee: Eurico Vergueiro

=== Campeonato Paulista ===
Pos	Team	Pld	W	D	L	GF	GA	GD	Pts	Qualification or relegation
2	Ypiranga	9	4	3	2	10	8	+2	11	
3	Internacional	9	4	2	3	19	14	+5	10	
4	Germânia	9	3	0	6	17	25	−8	6	
5	Corinthians	9	1	4	4	11	22	−11	6	
6	Santos	5	1	0	4	10	22	−12	2 (Note: Santos abandoned the championship before concluding the first round.)	Withdrew

Updated to match(es) played on October 26, 1913. Source: RSSSF.com
Rules for classification: 1) points; 2) goal difference; 3) wins; 4) head-to-head points.

==== Matches ====
2 June 1	Germânia	8–1	Santos	São Paulo
	Harold Cross		,, Vaz Porto,, Gerhardt; Severino; Well	Stadium: Parque da Antártica Paulista; Referee: Hutchinson

22 June 2	Corinthians	3–6	Santos	São Paulo
	Millon, Arnaldo Silveira, Ambrósio; Ricardo		César Nunes; Fabbi; Peres	Stadium: Parque da Antártica Paulista; Referee: Menezes

13 July 3	Internacional	5–1	Santos	São Paulo
	Hamilton; Eurico, Célio; Octacilio		Millon	Stadium: Parque da Antártica Paulista; Referee: Octávio Bicudo

7 September 4	Americano	6–1	Santos	São Paulo
	Juvenal,, Décio; Irineu		Arnaldo Silveira	Stadium: Parque da Antártica Paulista; Referee: Hutchinson

=== Campeonato Santista ===
==== Matches ====
5 October 1	Santos	5–1	Escolástica Rosa	Santos
	Millon, Paul, Arnaldo Silveira		(pen.) Aldo	Stadium: Ana Costa Field

12 October 2	Santos	5–2	América Santista	Santos
				Stadium: Ana Costa Field; Referee: Sydnei

9 November 3	Santos	6–3	Atlético Santista	Santos
	Paul,,, Arnaldo Silveira; Marba		Aralhe	Stadium: Ana Costa Field; Referee: Milton

23 November 4	Santos	5–0	Escolástica Rosa	Santos
				Stadium: Ana Costa Field; Referee: Eurico Vergueiro

30 November 5	Santos	7–1	América Santista	Santos
				Stadium: Ana Costa Field

14 December 6	Santos	7–0	Atlético Santista	Santos
				Stadium: Ana Costa Field
