= 1948 Campeonato Paulista =

Campeonato Paulista
- Season: 1948
- Champions: São Paulo
- Matches played: 110
- Goals scored: 415 (3.77 per match)
- Top goalscorer: Silas (Ypiranga) – 19 goals
- Biggest home win: São Paulo 8-0 Juventus (November 13, 1948)
- Biggest away win: Palmeiras 0-2 Santos (May 30, 1948); Jabaquara 0-2 Corinthians (June 20, 1948); Nacional 0-2 Santos (September 12, 1948); Portuguesa Santista 0-2 São Paulo (October 17, 1948); Jabaquara 1-3 Portuguesa (October 24, 1948); Comercial 0-2 Santos (December 5, 1948)
- Highest scoring: Santos 5-4 Comercial (August 29, 1948)

The 1948 Campeonato Paulista da Primeira Divisão, organized by the Federação Paulista de Futebol, was the 47th season of São Paulo's top professional football league. São Paulo won the title for the 5th time. No teams were relegated. The top scorer was Ypiranga's Silas with 19 goals.

== Championship ==
The championship was disputed in a double-round robin system, with the team with the most points winning the title.

Pos	Team	Pld	W	D	L	GF	GA	GD	Pts	Qualification or relegation
1	São Paulo	20	16	2	2	54	19	+35	34	Champions
2	Santos	20	15	2	3	54	31	+23	32	
3	Ypiranga	20	11	5	4	44	24	+20	27	
4	Corinthians	20	11	4	5	50	32	+18	26	
5	Portuguesa	20	9	2	9	49	34	+15	20	
6	Palmeiras	20	7	5	8	29	32	−3	19	
7	Juventus	20	7	5	8	32	49	−17	19	
8	Portuguesa Santista	20	6	5	9	29	41	−12	17	
9	Comercial	20	5	2	13	35	52	−17	12	
10	Jabaquara	20	2	3	15	21	46	−25	7	
11	Nacional	20	2	3	15	18	55	−37	7	

Updated to match(es) played on December 26, 1948. Source: RSSSF.com
Rules for classification: 1) points; 2) goal difference; 3) wins; 4) head-to-head points.

== Top Scores ==
Rank	Player	Club	Goals
1	Cilas	Ypiranga	19
2	Odair	Santos	14
3	Nininho	Portuguesa	13
4	Cláudio	Corinthians	12
5	Pinhegas	Santos	11
5	Pinga	Portuguesa	11
5	Renato	Portuguesa	11
5	Leônidas	São Paulo	11
9	Baltazar	Corinthians	10
9	Ponce de León	São Paulo	10
9	Mário Milani	Juventus	10
12	Paulo	Santos	9
