= 1924 Santos FC season =

- President: Manoel Oliveira Alfaya
- Manager: Urbano Caldeira
- Stadium: Vila Belmiro
- Top goalscorer: League: All: Araken Patusca; Siciri (19 goals)

The 1924 season was the thirteenth season for Santos FC.
