= 1951 Santos FC season =

Santos FC
1951 season
- President: Athiê Jorge Coury
- Campeonato Paulista: 5th
- Top goalscorer: League: All: Odair (36 goals)

The 1951 season was the fortieth season for Santos FC.
