= Vicente Feola =

Brazilian football manager (1909–1975)

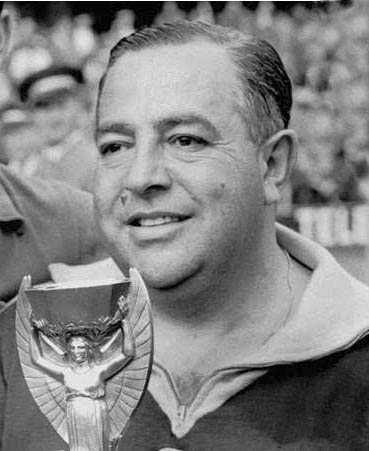
- Feola in 1958

Personal information
- Full name: Vicente Ítalo Feola
- Date of birth: 20 November 1909
- Place of birth: São Paulo, Brazil
- Date of death: 6 November 1975 (aged 65)
- Place of death: São Paulo, Brazil
- Position: Midfielder

Managerial career
- Years: Team
- 1937–1938: São Paulo
- 1939: São Paulo
- 1941–1942: São Paulo
- 1947–1950: São Paulo
- 1955–1956: São Paulo
- 1958: São Paulo
- 1958–1960: Brazil
- 1961: Boca Juniors
- 1966: Brazil
Medal record
Representing Brazil (As manager)
FIFA World Cup
| Winner | 1958 Sweden |

Vicente Ítalo Feola (pronounced [ˈfɛːola]; 20 November 1909 – 6 November 1975) was a Brazilian football manager and coach from São Paulo. He is best known for leading the Brazil national team to its first FIFA World Cup title in 1958.

== Biography ==
Feola was born in São Paulo to Italian parents. He died in 1975 aged 65.

== Coaching career ==
=== São Paulo ===
As São Paulo coach, Feola won the 1948 and 1949 Campeonato Paulista.

=== Brazil ===
==== 1958 World Cup ====
As Seleção boss in 1958, Feola introduced a 17-year-old Pelé to the footballing world, winning the FIFA World Cup in Sweden, the first and to date only time a non-European side has won a World Cup on European soil. The team trained in Hindås in Sweden during the tournament (pictured).

=== Boca Juniors ===
Feola was appointed manager of Argentine club Boca Juniors briefly in 1961.

=== Brazil return ===
==== 1966 World Cup ====
Feola returned as coach of the Brazil national team for the 1966 FIFA World Cup in England. In the first round of the tournament, Brazil lost their second game against Hungary. Pelé, although still recovering, was brought back for the last crucial match against Portugal for which Feola, panicked. He changed the entire defence, including the goalkeeper. In the attack, he maintained Jairzinho and substituted the other two players. In the midfield, he returned to the formation of the first match, even knowing that Pelé was still not fully recovered from his serious injuries. Brazil suffered a first round elimination. Under Feola's command, Brazil played 74 times, having won 55 games, tied 13 and lost 6 times.

== Honours ==
=== Manager ===
São Paulo

- Campeonato Paulista: 1948, 1949

Brazil

- FIFA World Cup: 1958
