= 1958 Santos FC season =

Santos FC
1958 season
- President: Athiê Jorge Coury
- Campeonato Paulista: 1st
- Torneio Rio – São Paulo: 7th
- Top goalscorer: League: Pelé (58 goals); All: Pelé (66 goals)

The 1958 season was the forty-seventh season for Santos FC.
