= 1937 Santos FC season =

- President: Carlos de Barros; Frederico Jorge Sobrinho; José Martins
- Manager: Franz Gaspar; Bilú; Alzemiro Ballio; Camarão
- Stadium: Estádio Urbano Caldeira
- Top goalscorer: League: All: Gradim (19 goals)

The 1937 season was the twenty-sixth season for Santos FC. The team finished first in the São Paulo Football League.
