= 1957 Santos FC season =

Santos FC
1957 season
- President: Athiê Jorge Coury
- Campeonato Paulista: 2nd
- Torneio Rio – São Paulo: 4th
- Top goalscorer: League: Pelé (17 goals); All: Pelé (57 goals)

The 1957 season was the forty-sixth season for Santos FC.

== Squad ==
=== Goal Keeper ===
- Laércio

=== Defender ===
- Dalmo
- Geraldo Scotto
- Wilson

=== Midfielder ===
- Dorval
- Jaïr
- Urubatão
- Zito

=== Forward ===
- Álvaro
- Pagão
- Pelé
- Pepe
- Tite
- Vasconcelos

=== Manager ===
- Lula
