= 1912 Santos FC season =

Santos FBC
1912 season
- President: Sizino Patusca
- Stadium: Avenida Ana Costa Field
- Top goalscorer: League: All: Arnaldo Silveira (2 goals)

The 1912 season was the first season for Santos Foot-Ball Club, a Brazilian football club, based in the Vila Belmiro bairro, Zona Intermediária, Santos, Brazil. The club played friendly matches against local clubs.

== Squad ==
No.	Pos.	Nation	Player
—	GK	FRA	Julien Fauvel
—	DF	BRA	Sidnei
—	DF	BRA	José Pereira da Silva
—	DF	BRA	Sebastião Arantes
—	MF	BRA	Ernani
—	MF	BRA	Oscar Bastos
—	MF	BRA	Montenegro
—	MF	BRA	Geraule Ribeiro

No.	Pos.	Nation	Player
—	MF	BRA	Marques
—	MF	BRA	Urbano Caldeira
—	FW	BRA	Adolpho Millon
—	FW	BRA	Hugo
—	FW	BRA	Maebado
—	FW	BRA	Nilo Arruda
—	FW	BRA	Carlos Ernesto Simon
—	FW	BRA	Arnaldo Silveira

== Friendly matches ==
23 June 1912 Friendly	Santos FBC	2 – 1	Santos city team	Santos
	Anacleto Silva; Geraule		Picuru	Stadium: Campo Vila Macuco
Note: As the field did not have the official sizes, the match is considered as Santos' "#0" match, not counting in any statistics

SANTOS FBC:
GK	(France) Julien Fauvel
DF	(Brazil) Simon
DF	(Brazil) Ari
MF	(Brazil) Bulle
MF	(Brazil) Ambrósio
MF	(Brazil) Oscar
FW	(Brazil) Bandeira
FW	(Brazil) Geraule
FW	(Brazil) Esteves
FW	(Brazil) Fontes
FW	(Brazil) Anacleto Silva
Manager:
None

SANTOS CITY TEAM:
GK	(Brazil) Annibal
DF	(Brazil) Pinto
DF	(Brazil) Ernani
MF	(Brazil) Nenê
MF	(Brazil) Picurru
MF	(Brazil) Belmiro
MF	(Brazil) Zezé
FW	(Brazil) Largacha
FW	(Brazil) Cunha
FW	(Brazil) Moura
FW	(Brazil) Marba
Manager:
?

15 September 1912 Friendly	Santos FBC	3 – 2	Santos AC	Santos
	Arnaldo Silveira; Adolpho Millon		Lee	Stadium: Avenida Ana Costa Field; Referee: Rodriguez

SANTOS FBC:
GK	(France) Julien Fauvel
DF	(Brazil) Sidnei
DF	(Brazil) Sebastião Arantes
MF	(Brazil) Ernani
MF	(Brazil) Oscar Bastos
MF	(Brazil) Montenegro
FW	(Brazil) Adolpho Millon Jr.
FW	(Brazil) Hugo
FW	(Brazil) Nilo Arruda
FW	(Brazil) Carlos Ernesto Simon
FW	(Brazil) Arnaldo Silveira
Manager:
None

SANTOS AC:
GK	(England) Parsons
DF	(England) Kent
DF	(England) Deweck
MF	(England) Wood
MF	(England) Seddon
MF	(England) Lee
FW	(England) Saul
FW	(England) De Saône
FW	(England) Allen
FW	(Republic of Ireland) V. Cross
FW	(Republic of Ireland) Harold Cross
Manager:
?

10 November 1912 Friendly	Santos FBC	1 – 0	Scratch Inglês	Santos
	Raymundo Marques			Stadium: Avenida Ana Costa Field; Referee: Praxedes Leão

SANTOS FBC:
GK	(France) Julien Fauvel
DF	(Brazil) Sidnei
DF	(Brazil) Sebastião Arantes
MF	(Brazil) Simon
MF	(Brazil) Oscar Bastos
MF	(Brazil) Montenegro
FW	(Brazil) Raymundo Marques
FW	(Brazil) Damaso
FW	(Brazil) Nilo Arruda
FW	(Brazil) Haroldo
FW	(Brazil) Arnaldo Silveira
Manager:
None

SCRATCH INGLÊS:
GK	(England) Deighton
DF	(England) Kent
DF	(England) Deweck
MF	(England) Ampiwrite
MF	(England) Wasil
MF	(England) Seddon
FW	(England) Pearsons
FW	(England) Saul
FW	(England) De Saône
FW	(England) Magion
FW	(Republic of Ireland) Cross
Manager:
?
