= 1936 Santos FC season =

- President: Carlos de Barros
- Manager: Bilú
- Stadium: Estádio Urbano Caldeira
- Campeonato Paulista (LPF): 4th
- Top goalscorer: League: All: Raul (36 goals)

The 1936 season was the twenty-fifth season for Santos FC.
