= 1932 Santos FC season =

- President: Joaquim Pedro dos Santos
- Manager: Urbano Caldeira
- Stadium: Vila Belmiro
- Top goalscorer: League: All: Feitiço (13 goals)

The 1932 season was the twenty-first season for Santos FC.
