= 1918 Santos FC season =

- President: Flamínio Levy; Wallace Simonsen
- Manager: Juan Bertone
- Stadium: Vila Belmiro
- Top goalscorer: League: All: Araken Patusca (32 goals)

The 1918 season was the seventh season for Santos Futebol Clube, a Brazilian football club, based in the Vila Belmiro bairro, Zona Intermediária, Santos, Brazil.
