= 1916 Santos FC season =

Santos FC
1916 season
- President: Agnelo Cícero de Oliveira
- Manager: Juan Bertone
- Stadium: Avenida Ana Costa Field; Vila Belmiro
- Top goalscorer: League: All: Araken Patusca (14 goals)

The 1916 season was the fifth season for Santos Futebol Clube, a Brazilian football club, based in the Vila Belmiro bairro, Zona Intermediária, Santos, Brazil.
