= 1929 Santos FC season =

Santos FC
1929 season
- President: Antônio Guilherme Gonçalves
- Manager: Urbano Caldeira
- Stadium: Vila Belmiro
- Campeonato Paulista (APEA): 2nd
- Top goalscorer: League: All: Feitiço (39 goals)

The 1929 season was the eighteenth season for Santos FC.
