= 1947 Santos FC season =

Santos FC
1947 season
- President: Athiê Jorge Coury
- Campeonato Paulista: 6th
- Top goalscorer: League: All: Adolfrises (16 goals)

The 1947 season was the thirty-sixth season for Santos FC.
