= 1956 Santos FC season =

Santos FC
1956 season
- President: Athiê Jorge Coury
- Campeonato Paulista: 1st
- Top goalscorer: League: All: Pagão (34 goals)

The 1956 season was the forty-fifth season for Santos FC.
