= 1946 Santos FC season =

Santos FC
1946 season
- President: Athiê Jorge Coury
- Campeonato Paulista: 4th
- Top goalscorer: League: All: Caxambu (26 goals)

The 1946 season was the thirty-fifth season for Santos FC.
