= 1917 Santos FC season =

- President: Agnelo Cícero de Oliveira; Flamínio Levy
- Manager: Juan Bertone
- Stadium: Vila Belmiro
- Top goalscorer: League: All: Araken Patusca (23 goals)

The 1917 season was the sixth season for Santos Futebol Clube, a Brazilian football club, based in the Vila Belmiro bairro, Zona Intermediária, Santos, Brazil.
