= 1930 Santos FC season =

- President: Antônio Guilherme Gonçalves
- Manager: Urbano Caldeira
- Stadium: Vila Belmiro
- Campeonato Paulista: 3rd
- Top goalscorer: League: All: Feitiço (48 goals)

The 1930 season was the nineteenth season for Santos FC.
