= 1945 Santos FC season =

Santos FC
1945 season
- President: Antônio Ezequiel Feliciano da Silva; Athiê Jorge Coury
- Campeonato Paulista: 6th
- Top goalscorer: League: All: Jorginho (17 goals)

The 1945 season was the thirty-fourth season for Santos FC.
