= 1931 Santos FC season =

- President: Antônio Guilherme Gonçalves; Joaquim Pedro dos Santos
- Manager: Urbano Caldeira
- Stadium: Vila Belmiro
- Campeonato Paulista: 2nd
- Top goalscorer: League: All: Feitiço (49 goals)

The 1931 season was the twentieth season for Santos FC.
