= 1919 Santos FC season =

- President: Wallace Simonsen; Flamínio Levy
- Manager: Juan Bertone
- Stadium: Vila Belmiro
- Top goalscorer: League: All: Araken Patusca (14 goals)

The 1919 season was the eighth season for Santos Futebol Clube, a Brazilian football club, based in the Vila Belmiro bairro, Zona Intermediária, Santos, Brazil.
