= 1940 Santos FC season =

- President: José Martins; Benedito Wenceslau Carneiro; Jaime Matias Ricão; Romeu de Andrade Lourenço
- Manager: Bilú; Dario Letona
- Stadium: Estádio Urbano Caldeira
- Campeonato Paulista: 7th
- Top goalscorer: League: All: Molina; Raul (13 goals)

The 1940 season was the twenty-ninth season for Santos FC.
