= 1920 Santos FC season =

- President: Flamínio Levy; Agnelo Cícero de Oliveira
- Manager: Ramon Platero
- Stadium: Vila Belmiro
- Top goalscorer: League: All: Araken Patusca (14 goals)

The 1920 season was the ninth season for Santos Futebol Clube, a Brazilian football club, based in the Vila Belmiro bairro, Zona Intermediária, Santos, Brazil.
