= 1955 Santos FC season =

Santos FC
1955 season
- President: Athiê Jorge Coury
- Campeonato Paulista: 1st
- Torneio Rio – São Paulo: 5th
- Top goalscorer: League: All: Del Vecchio (38 goals)

The 1955 season was the forty-fourth season for Santos FC.
