= 1952 Santos FC season =

Santos FC
1952 season
- President: Athiê Jorge Coury
- Campeonato Paulista: 5th
- Torneio Rio – São Paulo: 3rd
- Top goalscorer: League: All: Nicácio (36 goals)

The 1952 season was the forty-first season for Santos FC.
