= 1953 Santos FC season =

Santos FC
1953 season
- President: Athiê Jorge Coury
- Campeonato Paulista: 7th
- Torneio Rio – São Paulo: 9th
- Top goalscorer: League: All: Vasconcelos (25 goals)

The 1953 season was the forty-second season for Santos FC.
