= 1954 Santos FC season =

Santos FC
1954 season
- President: Athiê Jorge Coury
- Campeonato Paulista: 3rd
- Torneio Rio – São Paulo: 6th
- Top goalscorer: League: All: Vasconcelos (25 goals)

The 1954 season was the forty-third season for Santos FC.
