= 1941 Santos FC season =

- President: Romeu de Andrade Lourenço
- Manager: Dario Letona
- Stadium: Estádio Urbano Caldeira
- Campeonato Paulista: 4th
- Top goalscorer: League: All: Carabina (30 goals)

The 1941 season was the thirtieth season for Santos FC.
