= 1944 Santos FC season =

- President: Aristóteles Ferreira; Antônio Ezequiel Feliciano da Silvaa
- Manager: Ricardo Diez; De Maria
- Stadium: Estadio Urbano Caldeira
- Top goalscorer: League: All: Antoninho (12 goals)

The 1944 season was the thirty-third season for Santos FC.
