= Castelhano =

Brazilian footballer (1892–1980)

Personal information
- Full name: Cypriano Nunes
- Date of birth: 22 September 1892
- Place of birth: Santana do Livramento, Brazil
- Date of death: 26 November 1980 (aged 88)
- Position: Forward

International career
Years	Team	Apps	(Gls)
1920	Brazil	4	(0)

Cypriano Nunes, known as Castelhano, (22 September 1892 – 26 November 1980) was a Brazilian footballer. He played in four matches for the Brazil national football team in 1920. He was also part of Brazil's squad for the 1920 South American Championship.
