= 1938 Santos FC season =

- President: José Martins
- Manager: Camarão; Flavio Costa; José Arruda Penteado
- Stadium: Estádio Urbano Caldeira
- Campeonato Paulista: 6th
- Top goalscorer: League: All: Gradim (20 goals)

The 1938 season was the twenty-seventh season for Santos FC.
