= 1935 Campeonato Paulista =

The 1935 Campeonato Paulista da Primeira Divisão was the 34th season of São Paulo's top association football league. Two championships were disputed that season, each by a different league.

== LPF Championship ==
Campeonato Paulista
- Season: 1935
- Champions: Santos
- Matches played: 42
- Goals scored: 155 (3.69 per match)
- Top goalscorer: Teleco (Corinthians) – 9 goals
- Biggest home win: Portuguesa Santista 6–1 Paulista (June 16, 1935)
- Biggest away win: Paulista 1–5 Santos (June 23, 1935); Juventus 0–4 Portuguesa Santista (October 20, 1935); Paulista 1–5 Palestra Itália (November 3, 1935)
- Highest scoring: Portuguesa Santista 6–1 Paulista (June 16, 1935); Portuguesa Santista 5-2 Juventus (June 23, 1935); Paulista 3-4 Hespanha (September 15, 1935); Santos 5-2 Paulista (October 20, 1935)

In the edition organized by the LPF (Liga Paulista de Futebol), Santos won the title for the 1st time. No teams were relegated and the top scorer was Teleco from Corinthians with 9 goals.

=== System ===
The championship was disputed in a double round-robin system, with the team with the most points winning the title.

=== Championship ===
Pos	Team	Pld	W	D	L	GF	GA	GD	Pts	Qualification or relegation
1	Santos	12	9	2	1	31	11	+20	20	Champions
2	Palestra Itália	12	8	2	2	24	12	+12	18	
3	Corinthians	12	7	1	4	24	13	+11	15	
4	Portuguesa Santista	12	5	1	6	28	31	−3	11	
5	Hespanha	12	4	3	5	19	28	−9	11	
6	Paulista	12	2	1	9	17	43	−26	5	
7	Juventus	12	1	2	9	12	27	−15	4	

Updated to match(es) played on November 24, 1935. Source: RSSSF.com
Rules for classification: 1) points; 2) goal difference; 3) wins; 4) head-to-head points.

== APEA Championship ==
Campeonato Paulista
- Season: 1935
- Champions: Portuguesa
- Matches played: 56
- Goals scored: 280 (5 per match)
- Top goalscorer: Figueiredo (Ypiranga) – 19 goals
- Biggest home win: Portuguesa 11–0 Ordem e Progresso (July 7, 1935)
- Biggest away win: São Caetano 0–4 Ordem e Progresso (June 16, 1935)
- Highest scoring: Portuguesa 9–3 Ypiranga (July 28, 1935)

In the edition organized by the APEA (Associação Paulista de Esportes Atléticos), Portuguesa won the title for the 1st time. no teams were relegated and the top scorer was Ypiranga's Figueiredo with 19 goals.

=== System ===
The championship was disputed in a double round-robin system, with the team with the most points winning the title.

=== Championship ===
Pos	Team	Pld	W	D	L	GF	GA	GD	Pts	Qualification or relegation
1	Portuguesa	14	10	2	2	65	17	+48	22	Playoffs
2	Ypiranga	14	11	0	3	50	33	+17	22	Playoffs
3	Estudantes	14	9	2	3	47	16	+31	20	
4	São Caetano	15	8	2	5	33	34	−1	18	
5	Sírio-Libanês	12	5	2	5	22	31	−9	12 (Note: Sírio-Libanês didn't play its last matches against Ordem e Progresso and Jardim América.)	
6	Jardim América	14	4	1	9	24	39	−15	9	
7	Humberto I	14	3	1	10	20	48	−28	7	
8	Ordem e Progresso	13	1	0	12	13	54	−41	2	
9	Independente	2	0	0	2	3	5	−2	0 (Note: Clube de Regatas Tietê, having recently incorporated the first incarnation of São Paulo FC, participated in the championship under the name of Independente EC.)	Withdrew after two rounds

Updated to match(es) played on November 24, 1935. Source: RSSSF.com
Rules for classification: 1) points; 2) goal difference; 3) wins; 4) head-to-head points.

==== Playoffs ====
5 January 1936	Portuguesa	2 – 2	Ypiranga

12 January 1936	Portuguesa	5 – 2	Ypiranga
