= 1942 Santos FC season =

- President: Romeu de Andrade Lourenço; Aristóteles Ferreira
- Manager: Ratto
- Stadium: Estádio Urbano Caldeira
- Campeonato Paulista: 7th
- Top goalscorer: League: All: Rui (19 goals)

The 1942 season was the thirty-first season for Santos FC.
