= 1933 Santos FC season =

- President: Carlos de Barros
- Manager: Joaquim Loureiro; Bororó
- Stadium: Estádio Urbano Caldeira
- Campeonato Paulista: 5th
- Top goalscorer: League: All: Vitor Gonçalves (18 goals)

The 1933 season was the twenty-second season for Santos FC.
