= 1943 Santos FC season =

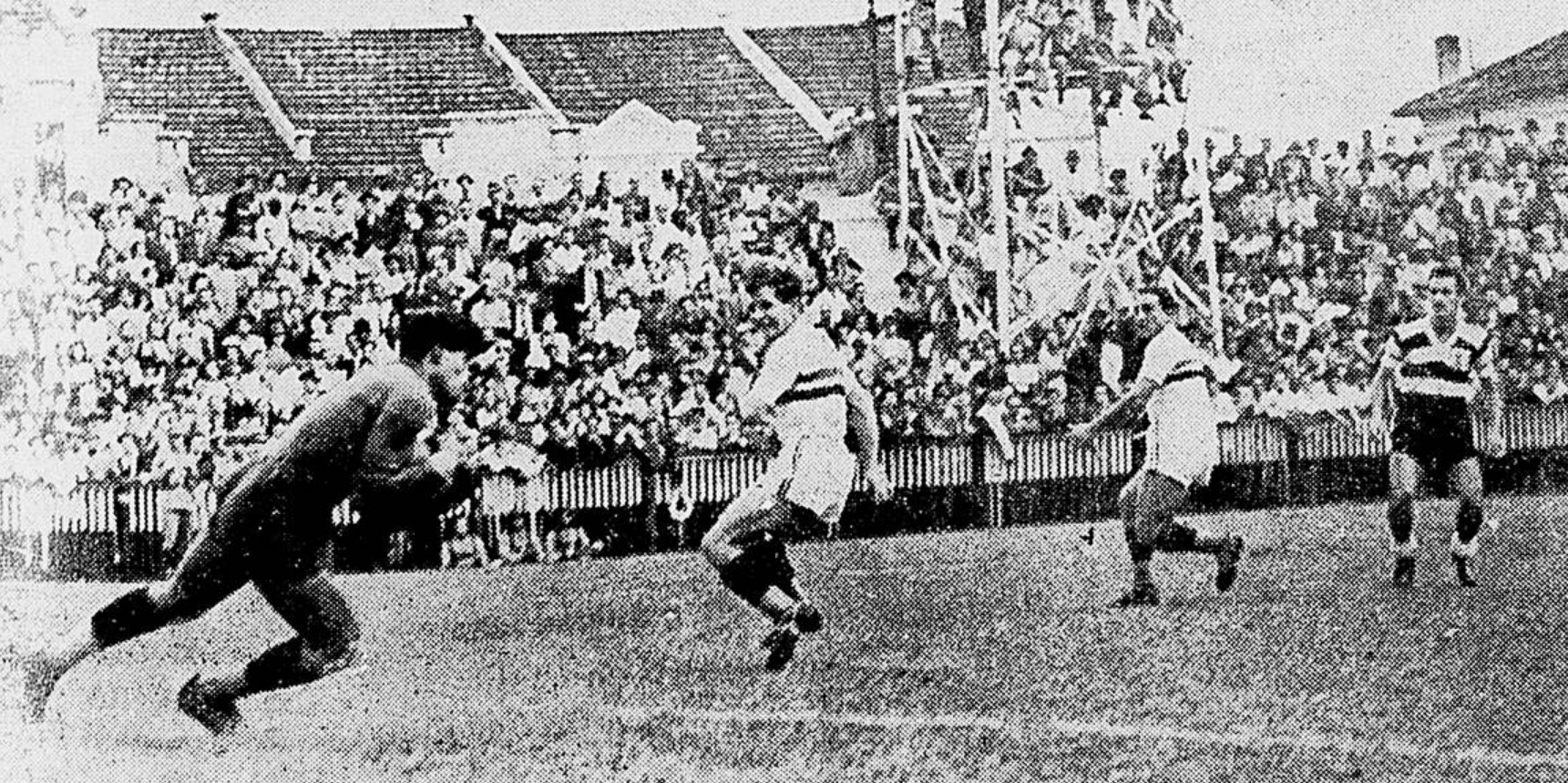
- Santos vs São Paulo at the Vila Belmiro on 30 September
- President: Aristóteles Ferreira
- Manager: Ademar Pimenta
- Stadium: Estadio Urbano Caldeira
- Campeonato Paulista: 6th
- Top goalscorer: League: All: Rui (19 goals)

The 1943 season was the thirty-second season for Santos FC.
