= 1939 Santos FC season =

- President: José Martins
- Manager: Camarão; Isaac Goldemberg
- Stadium: Estádio Urbano Caldeira
- Campeonato Paulista: 6th
- Top goalscorer: League: All: Raul (22 goals)

The 1939 season was the twenty-eighth season for Santos FC.
