= 1934 Santos FC season =

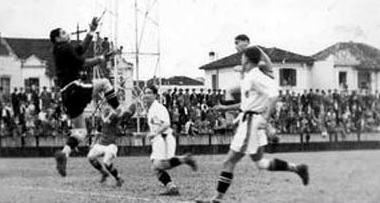
- Santos vs Palestra Itália
- President: Carlos de Barros
- Manager: Pedro Mazullo; Caêtano di Domênica
- Stadium: Estádio Urbano Caldeira
- Campeonato Paulista: 5th
- Top goalscorer: League: All: Mendes (11 goals)

The 1934 season was the twenty-third season for Santos FC.
