= Renato Violani =

Brazilian footballer

Renato
Personal information
- Full name: Renato Violani
- Date of birth: 1 March 1922
- Place of birth: São Paulo, Brazil
- Date of death: 13 October 2000 (aged 78)
- Place of death: São Paulo, Brazil
- Position: Right winger

Youth career
- Estrela da Saúde

Senior career*
Years	Team	Apps	(Gls)
1941–1942	Juventus-SP	35	(26)
1943–1945	Palmeiras	10	(8)
1945–1955	Portuguesa	306	(112)
1956–1960	Estrela da Saúde		
- * Club domestic league appearances and goals as of 1 February 2024

Renato Violani (1 March 1922 – 13 October 2000), was a Brazilian professional footballer who played as a winger.

== Career ==
Revealed at the club founded by his father, Estrela da Saúde, Renato Violani also played for CA Juventus. In 1943, he moved to Palmeiras, where he was state champion in 1944. He arrived at Portuguesa in 1945 and for the club he made 306 appearances and scored 112 goals, winning the Torneio-Rio São Paulo in 1952 and 1955, in addition to undefeated campaigns abroad. who won the Blue Ribbon on three occasions. He ended his career competing in the second division for Estrela da Saúde again, in 1960.

== Honours ==
Palmeiras

- Campeonato Paulista: 1944

Portuguesa

- Torneio Rio-São Paulo: 1952, 1955
- Fita Azul: 1951, 1953, 1954
