= Baltazar (footballer, born 1926) =

Brazilian footballer (1926–1997)

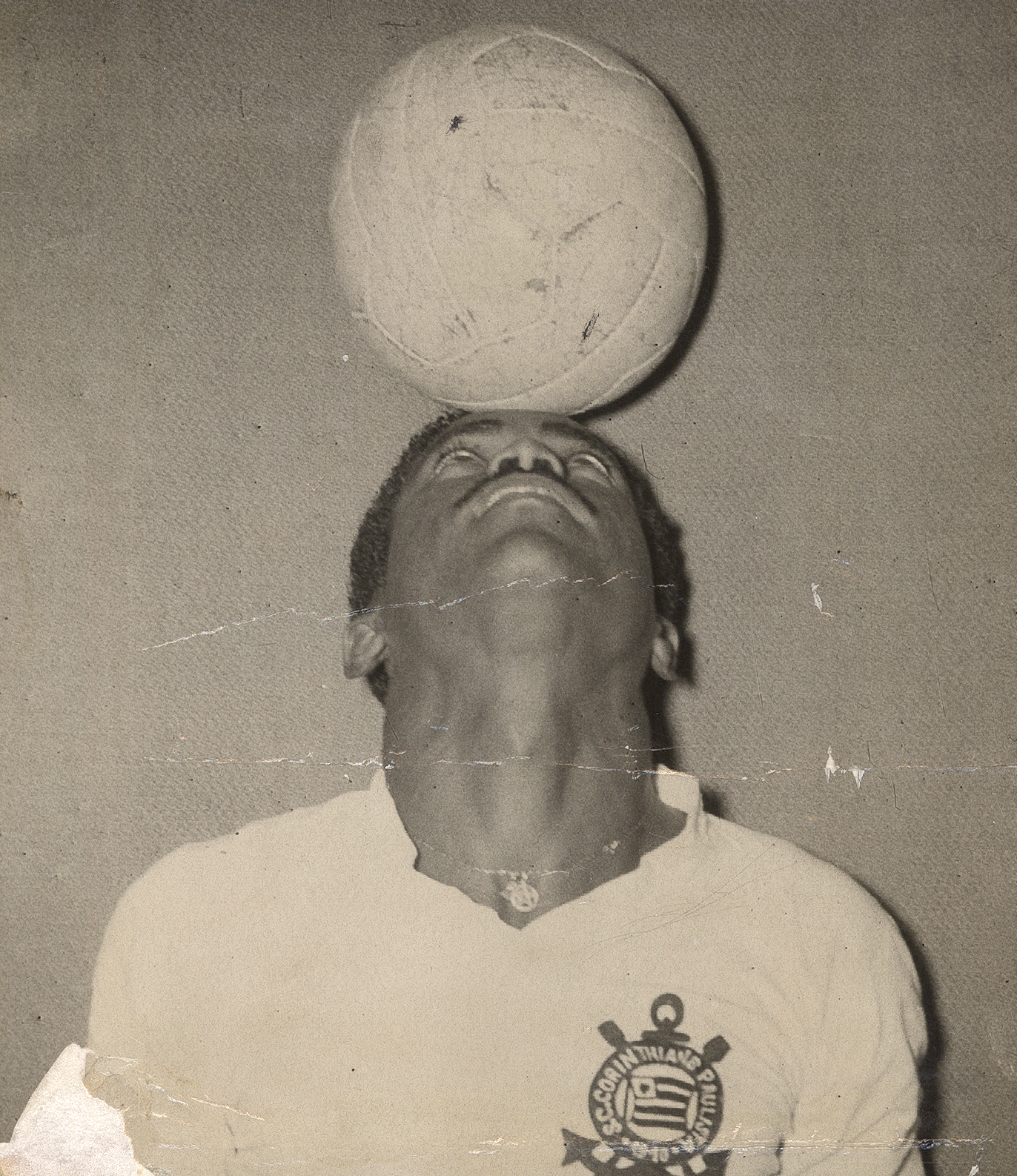
- Baltazar in 1955

Personal information
- Full name: Oswaldo da Silva
- Date of birth: 14 January 1926
- Place of birth: Santos, Brazil
- Date of death: 25 March 1997 (aged 71)
- Place of death: São Paulo, Brazil
- Position: Forward

Senior career*
| Years | Team | Apps | (Gls) |
| 1943 | União Monte Alegre | | |
| 1944–1945 | Jabaquara | | |
| 1945–1957 | Corinthians | 401 | (267) |
| 1957 | Juventus | | |
| 1957–1959 | Jabaquara | | |
| 1959 | União Paulista | | |

International career
| 1950–1956 | Brazil | 31 | (17) |
Medal record
Men's Football
Representing Brazil
FIFA World Cup
| Runner-up | 1950 Brazil |
South American Championship
| Runner-up | 1953 Peru |
Panamerican Championship
| Winner | 1952 Chile |
- * Club domestic league appearances and goals

Oswaldo da Silva (14 January 1926 – 25 March 1997), commonly known as Baltazar, was a Brazilian footballer. Nicknamed Cabecinha de Ouro (Golden Head) by fans for his heading ability, he played as a forward.

== Club career ==
Baltazar played for União Monte Alegre, Jabaquara, Corinthians, Juventus and União Paulista.

== International career ==
Baltazar also represented the Brazil national team, including at the 1950 World Cup and 1954 World Cup. He played four matches, scoring three goals, two against Mexico and one against Switzerland. He is the only player to score in two different opening world cup matches, netting one goal in 1950 and the other in 1954.

He died in São Paulo aged 71.

== Honours ==
Corinthans

- Torneio Rio–São Paulo: 1950, 1953, 1954
- Campeonato Paulista: 1951, 1952, 1954

Brazil

- Panamerican Championship: 1952
- Copa América Runner-up: 1953
- FIFA World Cup runner-up: 1950

Individual

- Campeonato Paulista Team of the Tournament: 1946, 1947, 1950, 1951
