= Arnaldo (footballer, born 1894) =

Brazilian footballer (1894–1980)

Personal information
- Full name: Arnaldo Patusca da Silveira
- Date of birth: 6 August 1894
- Place of birth: Santos, Brazil
- Date of death: 24 June 1980 (aged 85)
- Position: Forward

Senior career*
Years	Team	Apps	(Gls)
1906–1910	Americano		
1911	SPAC		
1912–1913	Santos FC		
1914	Paulistano		
1915–1922	Santos FC		

International career
1914–1919	Brazil	14	(0)
Medal record
Men's football
Representing Brazil
South American Championship
Winner	1919 Brazil
Third place	1916 Argentina
Third place	1917 Uruguay
- * Club domestic league appearances and goals

Arnaldo Patusca da Silveira (6 August 1894 – 24 June 1980), known as Arnaldo, was a Brazilian footballer who played as a forward. He made 14 appearances for the Brazil national team from 1914 to 1919. He was also part of Brazil's squad for the 1916, 1917, and 1919 South American Championship.

== Honours ==
Brazil

- Copa América: 1919
