= Constantino Mollitsas =

Brazilian footballer (1899–1966)

Personal information
- Date of birth: 2 December 1899
- Position: Forward

International career
Years	Team	Apps	(Gls)
1920	Brazil	3	(0)

Constantino Mollitsas (2 December 1899 – 24 September 1966) was a Brazilian footballer. He played in three matches for the Brazil national football team in 1920. He was also part of Brazil's squad for the 1920 South American Championship.
