= Bilú (footballer, born 1900) =

Brazilian footballer and manager

Personal information
- Full name: Virgílio Pinto de Oliveira
- Date of birth: 24 June 1900
- Place of birth: Santos, Brazil
- Date of death: 4 January 1965 (aged 64)
- Place of death: Santos, Brazil
- Position: Centre back

Youth career
- Santos

Senior career*
Years	Team	Apps	(Gls)
1919–1930	Santos		

Managerial career
- 1935–1937: Santos
- 1945: Santos
- * Club domestic league appearances and goals

Virgílio Pinto de Oliveira (24 June 1900 – 4 January 1965), commonly known as Bilú, was a Brazilian football manager and former player who played as a central defender.

== Career ==
Bilú had his entire career associated with Santos, as a player and manager. He made his debut for the club in 1919, playing in 195 matches until 1930 and subsequently becoming a secretary in 1933. In 1935, after a short period as a General Sports Director, he was named the club's manager, being the first manager to lift a trophy, the 1935 Campeonato Paulista.

Bilú left the managerial post in 1937, returning to his staff role. He became a director of the Amateur department in 1944, before returning to his previous role of General Sports Director in the following year, and also working as a manager for a brief period in 1945.

Bilú became the club's vice-president in 1951, being later a General Secretary in 1953, and moving to the Social and Propaganda Director role in 1957. He was also a referee during the 1930s.

== Personal life ==
Bilú's brothers Agnello, Ricardo, Randolfo and Américo, and his sister Iraídes, were all linked to Santos. Agnello was the club's president between 1914 and 1917, while Ricardo played for the club in 1913 and became a director; Randolfo and Américo also played for the club later on, while Iraídes was the club's dressmaker. Ricardo was also the husband of Ismênia da Silveira Pinto de Oliveira, the sister of Arnaldo and Oswaldo Silveira, both also Santos players. All of them were nephews of Sizino Patusca, Santos' first president.

== Honours ==
=== Manager ===
Santos

- Campeonato Paulista: 1935
