= Millon (footballer) =

Brazilian footballer (1895–1929)

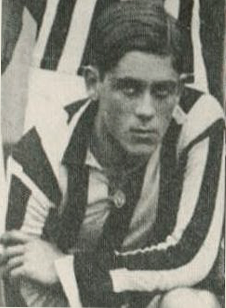

Personal information
- Full name: Adolpho Millon Júnior
- Date of birth: 16 September 1895
- Place of birth: Santos, Brazil
- Date of death: 7 May 1929 (aged 33)
- Position: Forward

Senior career*
Years	Team	Apps	(Gls)
1915–1923	Santos FC		

International career
1914–1919	Brazil	6	(1)
- * Club domestic league appearances and goals

Adolpho Millon Júnior (16 September 1895 – 7 May 1929), known as just Millon, was a Brazilian footballer who played as a forward for Santos FC. He made six appearances for the Brazil national team from 1914 to 1919, scoring once. He was also part of Brazil's squad for the 1917 South American Championship.
