= Odair Titica =

Brazilian footballer

Personal information
- Full name: Odair dos Santos
- Date of birth: 7 December 1925
- Place of birth: Santos, Brazil
- Date of death: 7 May 1996 (aged 70)
- Place of death: Santos, Brazil
- Position: Midfielder

Youth career
- 1940–1943: Santos

Senior career*
Years	Team	Apps	(Gls)
1943–1952	Santos	225	(134)
1952–1953	Palmeiras	58	(21)
1954	Ferroviária		
1955–1957	Jabaquara		
- * Club domestic league appearances and goals as of 1 February 2024

Odair dos Santos (7 December 1925 – 7 May 1996), mostly known as Odair Titica, was a Brazilian professional footballer who played as a midfielder.

== Career ==
Odair began his career with Santos' youth teams in 1940. In 1943 he was promoted to the main team, where he was the main player of the 1940s, with 225 appearances and 134 goals. He scored the 3000th goal in the club's history, in addition to being the first athlete to wear the number 10 shirt, years before it was immortalized by Pelé. He also played for Palmeiras, Ferroviária and Jabaquara.

== Death ==
After retiring from football, he worked at Port of Santos. He died 7 May 1996, aged 70.
