= Nacional Atlético Clube (SP) =

Nacional
- Full name: Nacional Atlético Clube
- Nicknames: Ferrinho; Naça; NAC
- Founded: February 16, 1919; 107 years ago
- Ground: Nicolau Alayon
- Capacity: 10,117
- President: Ayrton Santiago
- Head coach: Tuca Guimarães
- League: Campeonato Paulista Série A4
- 2025: Paulista Série A4, 4th of 16
- Website: www.nacionalacsp.com.br
Home colors	Away colors

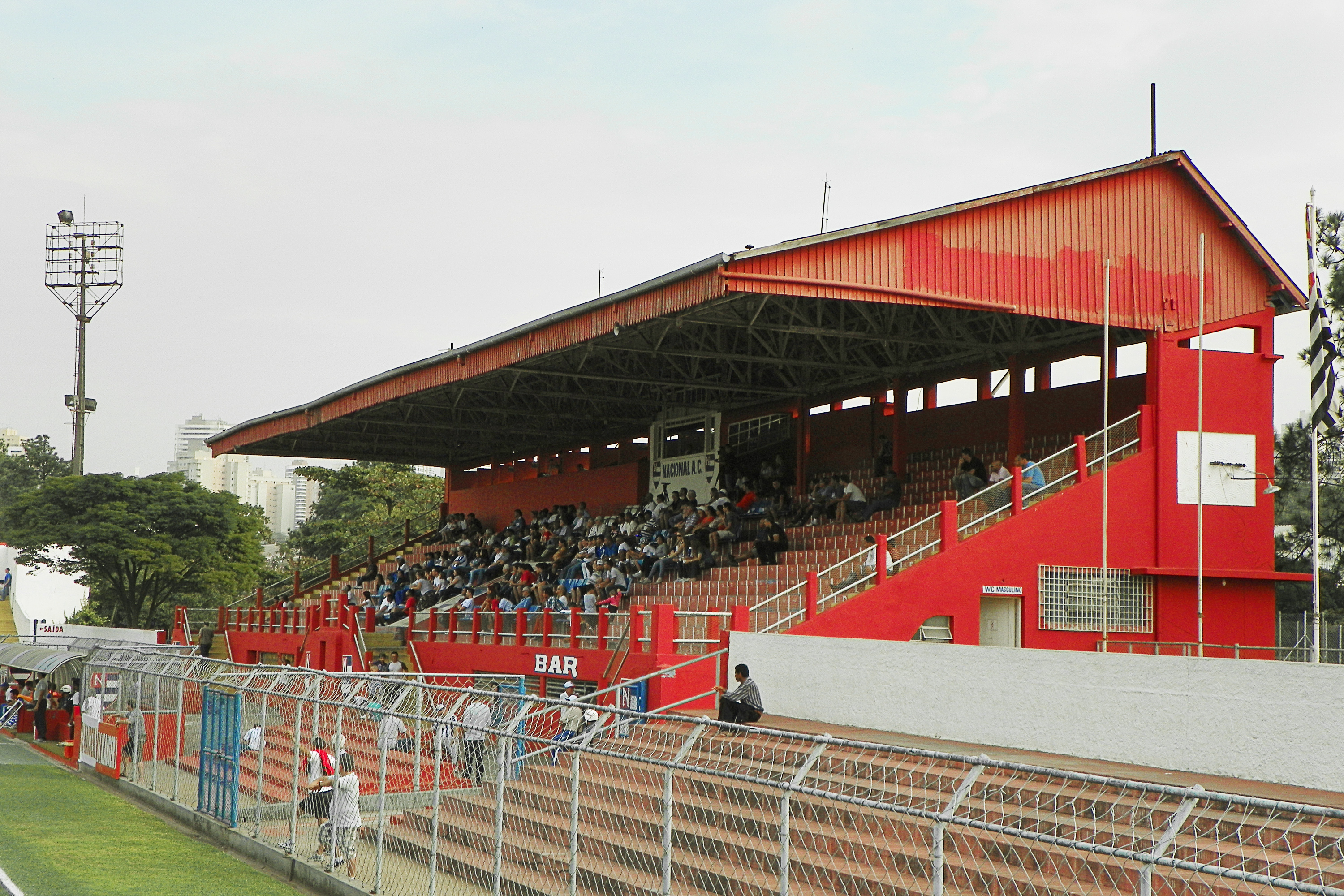
Grandstand of the club's stadium

Nacional Atlético Clube, commonly referred to as Nacional, is a Brazilian football team based in São Paulo, in the district of Barra Funda. The team competes in the Campeonato Paulista Série A4, the fourth tier of the São Paulo state football league.

Nacional was founded on 16 February 1919 as an association football club by employees of the British owned São Paulo Railway Company as São Paulo Railway Athletic Club, changing its name in 1946 when the Fourth Brazilian Republic was established and it nationalized the railways. The club is also known as NAC, Naça and Ferroviário ("Rail"), and its mascot is a locomotive. Since 1975, the club focuses on youth programs for football, volleyball, futsal, boxing, basketball, and button football, with a senior football team that has usually been relegated to the lower tiers of the São Paulo state football league system. A traditional rivalry existed with Juventus, in the nearby Mooca district of São Paulo, with their matches known as the Juvenal.

== History ==
For the construction of a railway from Jundiaí, about 50 km north of São Paulo, to the seaport Santos from 159 forward the São Paulo Railway Company was founded. The company operated largely with British capital, and management and engineers where primarily of same origin. In addition the project also attracted many British immigrants to work as common labourers. There were similar ventures, e.g., in the electricity sector. By the end of the century the employees of these companies also transported the association football game to Brazil.

On 14 April 1895 the first organised football match in Brazil between two sides is to have taken place when SPR employees encountered in Brás, a quarter close to the centre of São Paulo, employees of the Gas Company of São Paulo. One of the SPR employees at play there was Charles Miller, regarded alongside the German Hans Nobiling and in Rio Oscar Cox one of the great pioneers of the game in Brazil. Railway Company won the match 4–2.

Logo of the São Paulo Railway AC

However, it took until 1903 when the SPR officially organised football as a leisure activity for its employees and another one-and-a-half decades when a proper football club was formed on 16 February 1919.

In 1924 the club found access to the third division of the state league of São Paulo and reached ascension to the second division in 1925. In 1935 Nacional was one of the co-founders of today's state football association o São Paulo, the Federação Paulista de Futebol and in 1936 played the new first division of the now professional football league of São Paulo, finishing in 9th position. In 1939 the club achieved its best result, ending up fourth, only behind champions Corinthians, Palestra Itália, today's Palmeiras, and Portuguesa.

In 1943 Nacional won the Torneio Início, a traditional pre-season tournament of short matches between the first division teams held over a day or two. Nacional's Passarinho was, jointly with Servilio from Corinthians, top scorer of the 1945 season.

In 1946, after a military coup, the Fourth Brazilian Republic was established. The new government nationalized the nations railways that year, eliminating the SPR Company. As a result, the club was renamed to Nacional, though it retained the colours red, white and blue as homage to its British heritage. In their first game as Nacional, the team played with their SPR name and uniforms for the first half of a match against CR Flamengo of Rio de Janeiro at Pacaembu Stadium, then played for the first time in their Nacional uniforms for the second half of the match, losing the (full) match 3–5.

In 1948 the club finished last in the league, but was fortunate, that this season was played without relegation. Another last place in 1953 was however consequential. Nacional suspended football operations but was readmitted by the São Paulo football association to the first division for 1956. The next relegation followed in 1959.

Nacional remained in the second division until 1971. In 1974 it once more achieved access to the first division, but was immediately relegated again.

After this Nacional restricted its activities to the amateur and youth levels, where in 1972 the club had already won the Copa São Paulo de Juniores, a success the club could repeat in 1988.

In later years the club made some attempts to revive professional football at the club. In 1994, the club won the third division of the state league of São Paulo and competed in the following year in the national third division, the Série C, but was eliminated there in the first stage. In 1998 the club competed again in the Série C, but once more was ousted in the first round.

In 2000, Nacional won the Campeonato Paulista Série A-3 and also competed in the preliminary stages of the official national championship, in that year held as Copa João Havelange. Nevertheless, Nacional was eliminated in the first stage. In the same decade the club also played 2005 and 2007 in the second state division.

Since 2010 the club competes in the fourth division of São Paulo. It runs the Academia Nacional de Esportes, the name of which is solely based on the name of the club.

== Stadium ==
The club owns since 1938 the Nicolau Alayon stadium, often named after the street where it is located Estádio Comendador Sousa, which has a maximum capacity of 9,650 people.

== Honours ==
=== Official tournaments ===
State
Competitions	Titles	Seasons
Campeonato Paulista Série A3	3	1994, 2000, 2017
Campeonato Paulista Série A4	1	2014

=== Other tournaments ===
==== State ====
- Torneio Início (1): 1943

=== Runners-up ===
- Campeonato Paulista Série A2 (2): 1970, 1974

=== Youth team ===
- Copa São Paulo de Futebol Júnior (2): 1972, 1988
