= Comercial Futebol Clube (São Paulo) =

Brazilian football club

Comercial
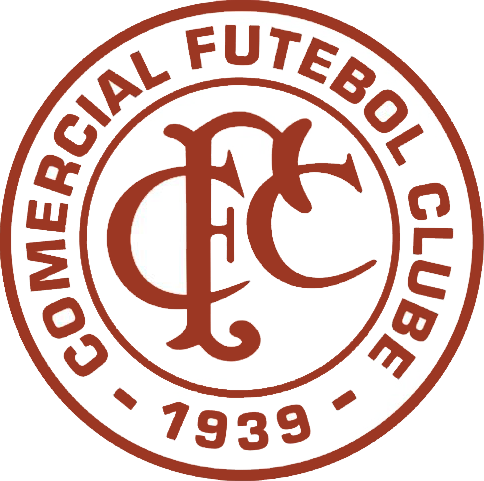
- Full name: Comercial Futebol Clube
- Nickname: O Mais Simpático
- Founded: 3 April 1939; 87 years ago
- Dissolved: 1979; 47 years ago
- Ground: Estádio Rua Javari; Estádio do Pacaembu
- League: Campeonato Paulista
Home colours	Away colours

Comercial Futebol Clube or simply Comercial was a football club based in Sé, São Paulo, Brazil. Founded on April 3, 1939, its colors were red and white. Disputed the Campeonato Paulista for 16 times (1939–1949, 1951–1953 and 1958–1959), but without getting a great season. The club played at professional level until 1961, and in the youth categories until 1979, when the club was extinguished after the death of the then president Antônio La Porta.

Is one of the founding members of the Federação Paulista de Futebol, the Football Association of São Paulo league, and the only one that went extinct. To this day, the FPF keeps the Comercial's badge with the other founders at the entrance of its building.

== Merge with São Caetano EC ==
From 1954 to 1957 Comercial and São Caetano Esporte Clube merged into the A.A. São Bento (club without any relationship with Associação Atlética São Bento) as both clubs faced financial problems. The merger ended in 1958 and both teams dropped out of professional football in the ensuing years.

== Notable players ==
- Armandinho
- Arthur Machado
- Clóvis Nori
- Dino Sani
- Elyseo
- Gino Orlando
