= Clube Atlético Ypiranga =

Ypiranga
- Full name: Clube Atlético Ypiranga
- Nickname(s): Vovô da Colina Histórica
- Founded: July 10, 1906; 118 years ago
- President: Vivian Maritan Casagrande Chiado
Home colours	Away colours

Clube Atlético Ypiranga, also known as Ypiranga, are a Brazilian social club from São Paulo, Brazil.

== History ==
The club was founded on June 10, 1906, The team first entered the Paulista championship in 1910, and became a regular participant; even though the team never won any Paulista titles, it managed to be runner-up thrice, and was one of the founding members of the Federação Paulista de Futebol . From 1932 to 1950, Ypiranga played its home matches at the Nami Jafet stadium. In 1953, the club lost its headquarters, triggering a crisis in the club that culminated in the team being relegated the next year. The team was invited back into the first level in 1957, but by then, the team, out of a stadium and in a deep financial crisis, entered into a merger with Corinthians of Santo André, hosting its matches in the local stadium, and after being relegated in the 1958 Campeonato Paulista, it abandoned professional football altogether but is still active as a social club.

Some of its most notable players include Moacyr Barbosa, who played for the team between 1942 and 1944, and who would go on to play for the national team, and Arthur Friedenreich, who played for the club in three stints between 1910 and 1917.

== Honours ==
- Campeonato Paulista
  - Runners-up (3): 1913, 1935 (APEA), 1936 (APEA)
- Torneio Início
  - Winners: (2) 1948, 1950
