= Jabaquara Atlético Clube =

Jabaquara
- Full name: Jabaquara Atlético Clube
- Nicknames: Jabuca; Leão da Caneleira
- Founded: 15 November 1914; 111 years ago
- Ground: Estádio Espanha
- Capacity: 8,031
- President: Bento Marques Prazeres
- League: Campeonato Paulista Série A4
- 2025: Paulista Série A4, 11th of 16
- Website: https://www.jabaquaraac.com.br
Home colours	Away colours	Third colours

Jabaquara Atlético Clube, or simply Jabaquara, is a Brazilian football team based in Santos, São Paulo. Founded in 1914, it plays in Campeonato Paulista Segunda Divisão.

== History ==
Jabaquara Atlético Clube was founded on 15 November 1914 by Spanish immigrants as the Hespanha Foot Ball Club. The club played their first game against Clube Afonso XIII, which was another club founded by Spanish immigrants. The game ended in a 1–1 draw. The club was forced by the Brazilian government to change their name to Jabaquara Atlético Clube during World War II. They changed their name on 7 November 1942. The team was one of the founding members of the Federação Paulista de Futebol and participated in the Campeonato Paulista from 1935 to 1952, and from 1955 to 1963.

They closed their football department in 2001, reopening it in the following year. Jabaquara won the Campeonato Paulista Série A3 in 1993, and the Campeonato Paulista Série B3 in 2002.

== Stadium ==
Jabaquara play their home games at Estádio Espanha. The stadium has a maximum capacity of 8,031 people.

== Honours ==
=== State ===
- Campeonato Paulista
  - Runners-up (2): 1927, 1934
- Campeonato Paulista Série A2
  - Winners (1): 1927
- Campeonato Paulista Série A3
  - Winners (1): 1993
- Campeonato Paulista Série B3
  - Winners (1): 2002

=== City ===
- Campeonato Santista (ASEA)
  - Winners (1): 1930
