= Araken Patusca =

Brazilian footballer (1905-1990)

Araken
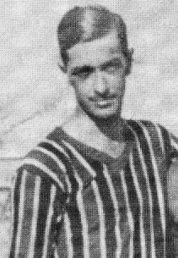
- Araken in 1933

Personal information
- Full name: Araken Patusca
- Date of birth: 17 July 1905
- Place of birth: Santos, Brazil
- Date of death: 24 January 1990 (aged 84)
- Place of death: Santos, Brazil
- Height: 1.73 m (5 ft 8 in)
- Position: Forward

Senior career*
Years	Team	Apps	(Gls)
1923–1929	Santos	193	(182)
1925	Paulistano	?	(?)
1930	Flamengo	0	(0)
1930–1935	São Paulo	124	(67)
1935–1937	Santos	?	

International career
1930	Brazil	1	(0)
- * Club domestic league appearances and goals

Araken Patusca (17 July 1905 – 24 January 1990) was a Brazilian footballer who played as a striker. He was born in Santos.

Throughout his career (1923–1937), he played for Santos FC, Club Athletico Paulistano, Clube de Regatas do Flamengo, São Paulo. Having been three consecutive times runner-up with Santos (1927, 1928, 1929) at the Campeonato Paulista, he won the title with them in 1931, and then in 1935 with Independente. With Siriri, Feitiço, Evengelista and Camarão formed one of the most important attacking lines of the 1920s. In 1928, he was the top goalscorer of the Campeonato Paulista.

He scored the 1000th goal in Santos FC history against Atlas Flamengo in 1929. In total he scored 182 goals in 193 matches for Santos and is considered a club idol.

With the Brazil national team he participated in the first edition of the World Cup in 1930, playing one match against Yugoslavia. He was the only player from São Paulo (state) to represent the national team at the inaugural tournament, going against the wishes of the CBD that wanted to take only players in activity in Rio de Janeiro. In the end, he signed for Flamengo to be able to travel with the team, but never played a single game at the club. He died at 84 years old.

== Personal life ==
Araken was son of Sizino Patusca, the first Santos FC president, brother of Ary Patusca and cousin of Arnaldo da Silveira.

== Honours ==
=== Club ===
- Campeonato Paulista:

São Paulo: 1931
Santos FC: 1935

=== Individual ===
- Campeonato Paulista top scorer:

Santos FC: 1927 (31 goals)
