= Athiê Jorge Coury =

Brazilian footballer and politician (1904–1992)

President of Santos FC
- In office 27 February 1945 – 28 February 1971
- Preceded by: Antônio Ezequiel Feliciano da Silva
- Succeeded by: Vasco José Fae

State Deputy of São Paulo
- In office 1946–1963

Councillor of Santos
- In office 1947–1949

Federal Deputy for São Paulo
- In office 1963–1983

Personal details
- Born: Athiê Jorge Coury; 1 August 1904 Itu, São Paulo, Brazil
- Died: 1 December 1992 (aged 88) Santos, São Paulo, Brazil
- Party: PSP, PDC, MDB
- Profession: Footballer, politician
Association football career
- Position: Goalkeeper
Youth career
- Sírio
Senior career*
Years	Team	Apps	(Gls)
1927–1934	Santos	171	(0)
- * Club domestic league appearances and goals

Athiê Jorge Coury (Note: sometimes spelled as Athié Jorge Cury, Athiê Jorge Cory or Athié Jorge Coury) (1 August 1904 – 1 December 1992), was a Brazilian footballer, politician, and a former president of Santos FC.

Coury is widely known for his period as president of Santos during the Os Santásticos period.

== Early life ==
Born in Itu, São Paulo to Jorge and Olga Coury, both from Lebanese origins, Coury studied his primary and secondary school at the Colégio São Luís in his hometown, before moving to Piracicaba where he studied surveying for two years.

After moving to São Paulo, Coury graduated in economics at the Colégio Mackenzie. During his teens, he was already a goalkeeper for Esporte Clube Sírio.

Coury was a president of the Bolsa de Café of Santos, and helped mayor Paulo Gomes Barbosa to win the landscape where would be established the Instituto Brasileiro do Café.

On 26 January 1950, the new sports gymnasium of Santos was inaugurated with his name. A housing complex in the Saboó neighborhood was also named after him.

== Playing career ==
After being convinced to play for Santos FC by former board members Ricardo Pinto de Oliveira and Zeca Ratto, Coury officially joined the club on 9 September 1927. Known as Athiê during his playing days, he made his debut for the club on 9 October, aged 23, in a 9–0 win over Corinthians de Santo André.

In the following years, Athiê was constantly called up to the São Paulo state team, and was touted to be a member of the Brazil national team squad for the 1930 FIFA World Cup. However, due to discrepancies between board members of the São Paulo state and the Confederação Brasileira de Desportos, he was not included in the squad.

Athiê played his last match for Santos on 15 April 1934, a 3–0 loss to Palestra Itália. He played 171 matches for the club during that spell.

== Santos FC president ==
After retiring from playing, Coury was a sports director of Santos, before becoming a treasury director. On 27 February 1945, he was elected president of the club, succeeding Antônio Ezequiel Feliciano da Silva.

Coury remained as a president in the following decades, leading the club initially to the Campeonato Paulista titles of 1955 and 1956, before the arrival of Pelé and the growing reputation of the Os Santásticos team which won several other trophies. On 28 February 1971, he left the presidency after 26 years in the role, being defeated by Vasco José Faé.

== Political career ==
Coury was a second lieutenant during the 1932 Constitutionalist Revolution, and fought along the Constitutionalists. In 1946, he was elected State Deputy of São Paulo, before becoming a Councilor for the city of Santos in the following year. He left the former role in 1963, after being elected Federal Deputy.

Initially a member of the Christian Democratic Party during his first tenure, Coury was re-elected another five times as a Federal Deputy, all as a member of the Brazilian Democratic Movement. He remained a member of the National Congress until 1983, when he retired from politics.

== Death ==
Coury died on 1 December 1992, aged 88, in Santos.
