= Urbano Caldeira =

Brazilian footballer and manager

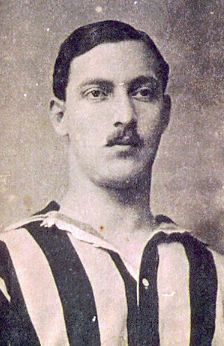
- Caldeira playing for Santos FC

Personal information
- Full name: Urbano Vilella Caldeira Filho
- Date of birth: 9 January 1890
- Place of birth: Florianópolis, Brazil
- Date of death: 13 March 1933 (aged 43)
- Place of death: São Vicente, Brazil
- Position: Centre back

Senior career*
Years	Team	Apps	(Gls)
- Germânia
- AA das Palmeiras
1913–1917	Santos		

Managerial career
- 1913–1915: Santos (player-manager)
- 1924–1932: Santos
- * Club domestic league appearances and goals

Urbano Vilella Caldeira Filho (9 January 1890 – 13 March 1933), known as Urbano Caldeira, was a Brazilian football player and manager at Santos FC. His position was central defender.

== Career ==
Born in Florianópolis, Santa Catarina, Caldeira moved to São Paulo after becoming an employee of the Brazilian customs agency.

After representing Sport Club Germânia and Associação Atlética das Palmeiras, Caldeira joined Santos FC in 1913, when the club had its first season in football.

Caldeira was a player-manager of Santos FC for two years, also helping in the construction of the club's stadium in 1916. In 1917, he retired, but remained with the club as a member of the board.

In 1924, Caldeira was again appointed manager of Santos FC. He remained in the role until 1932, and died on 13 March 1933, one day after the club's first professional match.

== Honours ==
Shortly after Caldeira's death, Santos FC's board decided to name the club's stadium after him: Estádio Urbano Caldeira, in honor of his years of dedication for the club. In 1938, the club also stated that 9 January would be "Urbano Caldeira Day".

== See also ==
- List of one-club men
