= List of Santos FC managers =

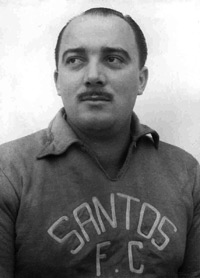
Lula is Santos' most successful manager, winning 21 trophies.

Santos FC is a football club based in Santos, that competes in the Campeonato Paulista, São Paulo's state league, and the Campeonato Brasileiro Série A or Brasileirão, Brazil's national league. The club was founded in 1912 by the initiative of three sports enthusiasts from Santos by the names of Raimundo Marques, Mário Ferraz de Campos, and Argemiro de Souza Júnior, and played its first friendly match on 23 June 1914. Initially Santos played against other local clubs in the city and state championships, but in 1959 the club became one of the founding members of the Taça Brasil, Brazil's first truly national league. As of 2010, Santos is one of only five clubs never to have been relegated from the top level of Brazilian football, the others being São Paulo, Flamengo, Internacional and Cruzeiro.

The first full-time manager for Santos was Urbano Caldeira. He originally came from São Paulo to work as a clerk for the club but soon became a player/manager who spent his spare time planting trees and gardens for Santos. The most successful Santos FC manager in terms of trophies won is Lula, who won five Brasileirão titles, eight Campeonato Paulista trophies, four Rio-São Paulo tournaments, two Intercontinental Cups and two Copa Libertadores trophies, the most prestigious laurel in South America, in his 12-year reign as manager. Under Lula's management, Santos became the first club in Brazil and the world to win the continental treble consisting of the Paulista, Taça Brasil, and the Copa Libertadores. That same year, it also became the first football club ever to win four out of four competitions in a single year, thus completing the quadruple, comprising the aforementioned treble and the Intercontinental Cup.

As of 2011 the manager is Muricy Ramalho, becoming the second manager, after Lula, to win the Copa Libertadores and the continental double by winning the 2011 Campeonato Paulista and the 2011 Copa Libertadores.

== List of managers ==
During the first 46 years of Santos's existence, from 1912 to 1958, Brazil did not have a national football league. Santos competed almost solely in the championship of the city of Santos.

In 1959, the Taça Brasil, Brazil's first national football league, was formed, with Santos among the founder members. The club continue to participate in the Paulista championship which continued alongside the Brasileirão. Clubs qualified to the Taça Brasil based on their placings in the regional championships until 1967, when it became open to all teams through the Robertão.

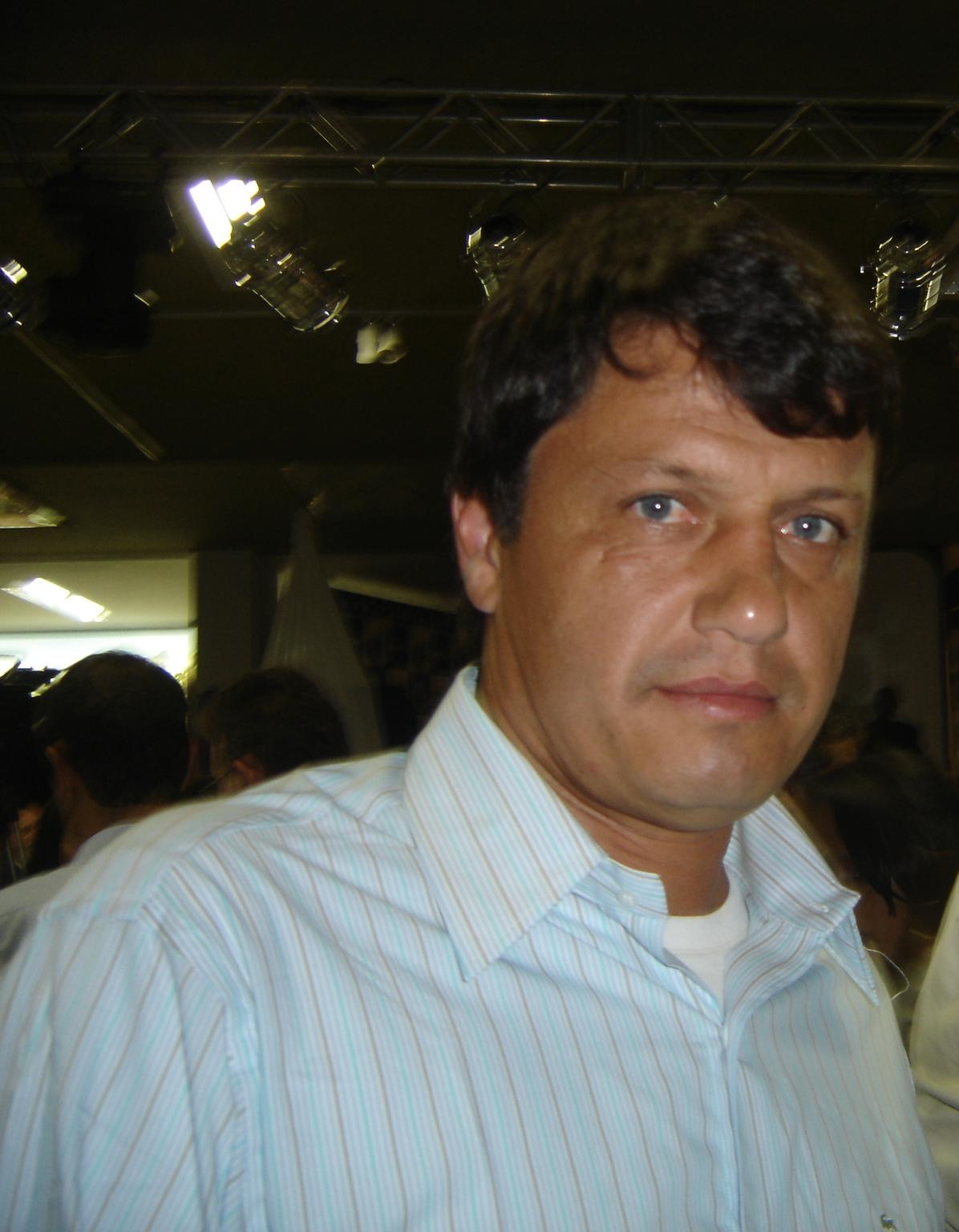
Adílson Batista

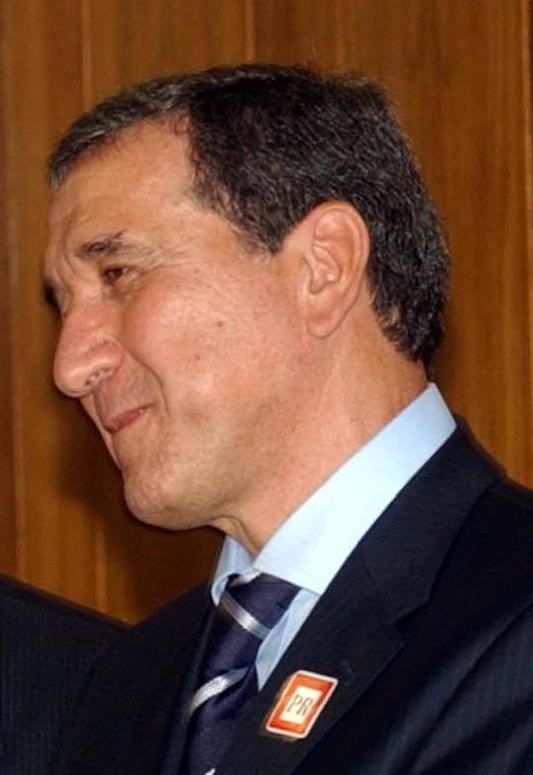
Carlos Alberto Parreira

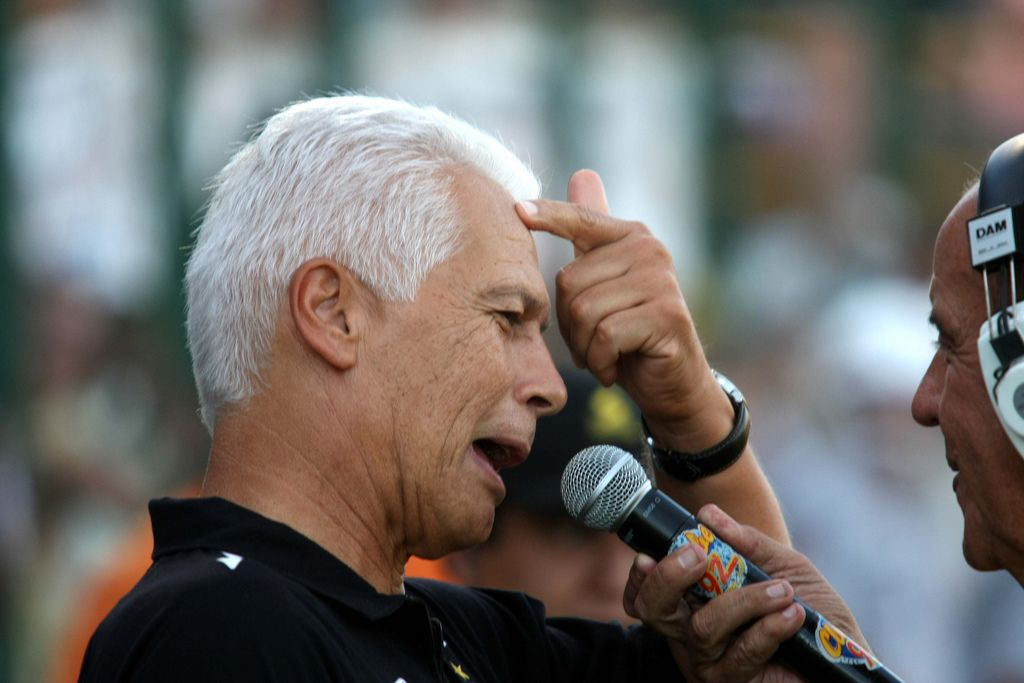
Émerson Leão

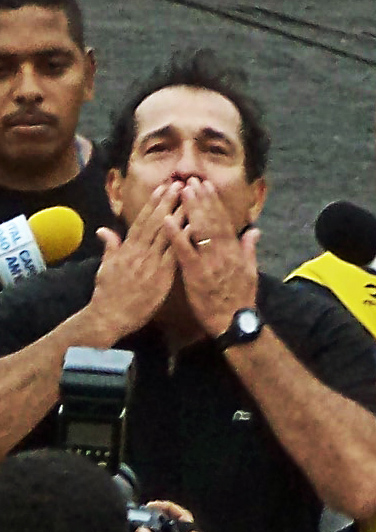
Muricy Ramalho

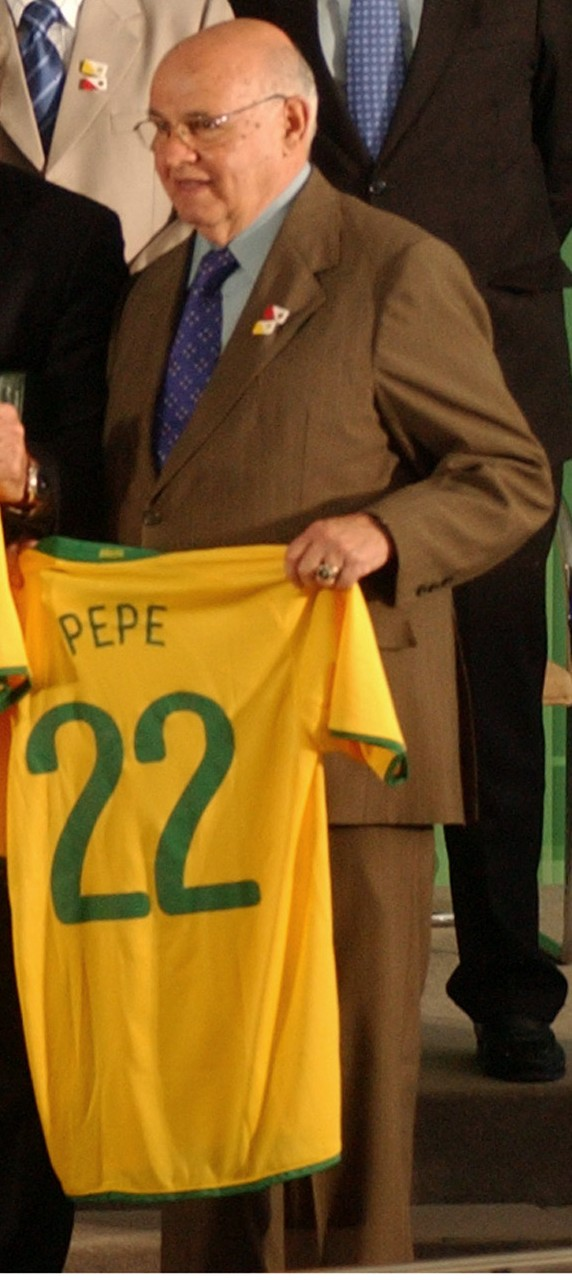
Pepe

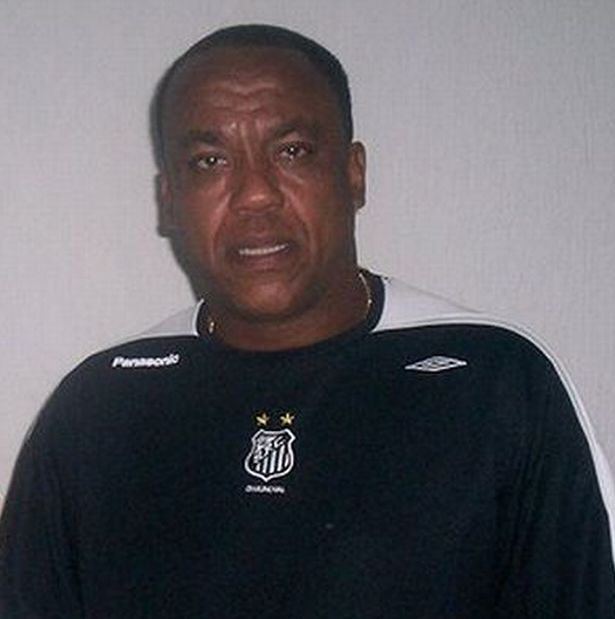
Serginho

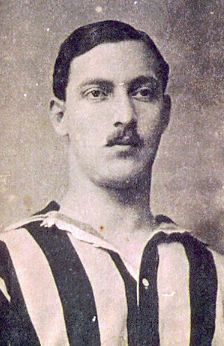
Urbano Caldeira

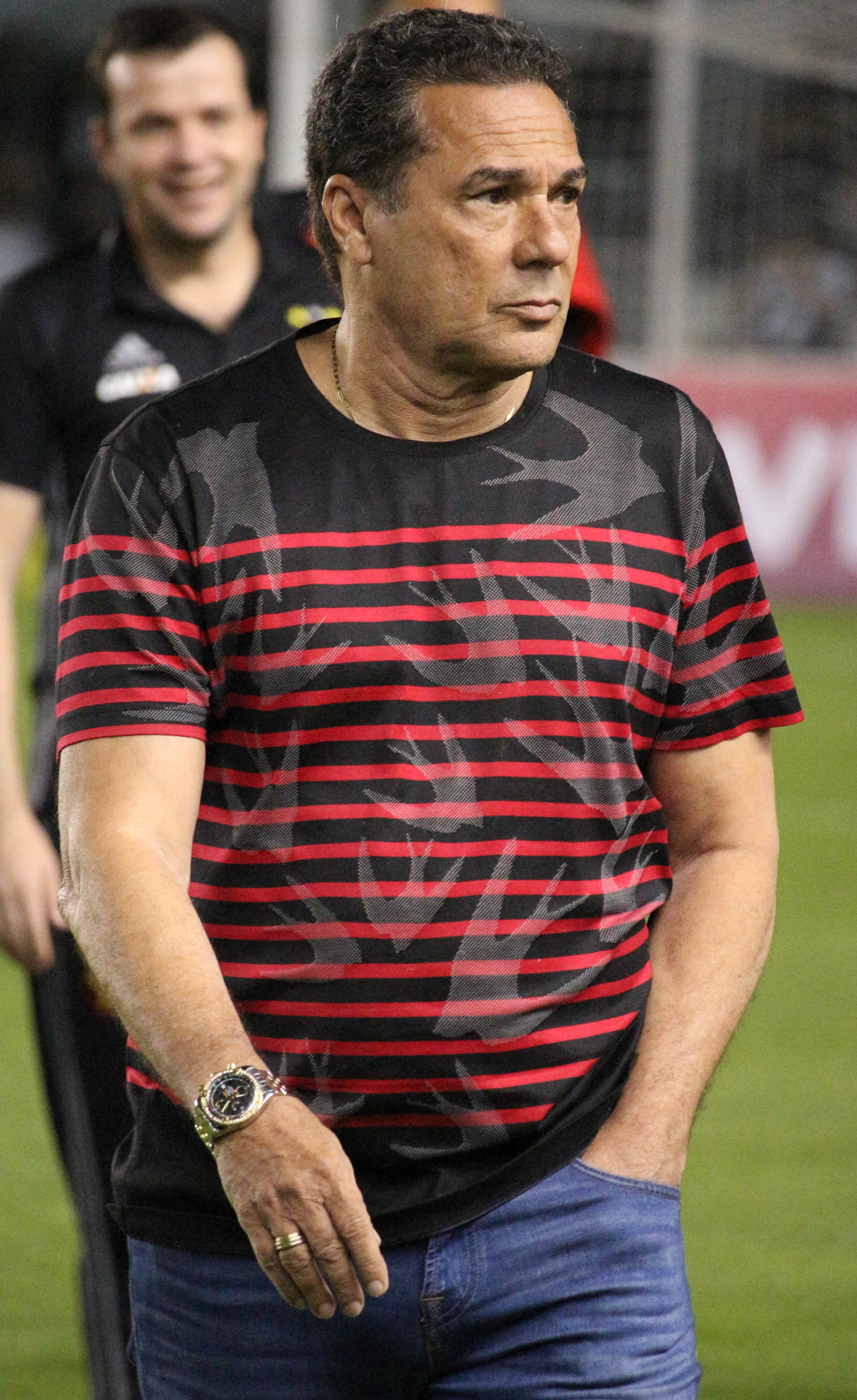
Vanderlei Luxemburgo

Name	Nationality	From	To	Titles won	Refs
No manager		1912	1912		
Urbano Caldeira	Brazil	1912	1915	Campeonato Santista (1913, 1915)	
Juan Bertone	Uruguay	1916	1919		
Ramón Platero	Uruguay	1920	1920		
Urbano Caldeira	Brazil	1921	1932		
Joaquim Loureiro	Brazil	1933	1933		
Bororó	Brazil	1933	1933		
Pedro Mazullo	Uruguay	1934	1934		
Caêtano di Domênica	Italy	1934	1935		
Bilú	Brazil	1935	1936	Campeonato Paulista (1935)	
Franz Gaspar	Brazil	1937	1937		
Bilú	Brazil	1937	1937		
Alzemiro Ballio	Brazil	1937	1937		
Camarão	Brazil	1937	1938		
Flavio Costa	Brazil	1938	1938		
José Arruda Penteado	Brazil	1938	1938		
Camarão	Brazil	1939	1939		
Isaac Goldenberg	Brazil	1939	1939		
Bilú	Brazil	1940	1940		
Darío Letona	Peru	1940	1941		
Ratto	Brazil	1942	1942		
Adhemar Pimenta	Brazil	1943	1943		
Ricardo Diez	Uruguay	1944	1944		
De Maria	Brazil	1944	1944		
Bilú	Brazil	1945	1945		
Abel Picabéa	Argentina	1946	1947		
Diego Ayala	Paraguay	1948	1948		
Albertinho	Brazil	1948	1948		
Osvaldo Brandão	Brazil	1948	1950		
Caêtano di Domênica	Italy	1950	1950		
Artigas	Brazil	1950	1950		
Luiz Comitante	Brazil	1950	1950		
Niginho	Brazil	1950	1951		
Antoninho	Brazil	1951	1951		
Artigas	Brazil	1951	1951		
Luiz Comitante	Brazil	1951	1951		
Aymoré Moreira	Brazil	1951	1952		
Lula	Brazil	1952	1952		
Artigas	Brazil	1952	1953		
Antoninho	Brazil	1953	1954		
Giuseppe Ottina	Italy	1954	1954		
Lula	Brazil	1955	1966	Campeonato Paulista (1955, 1956, 1958, 1960, 1961, 1962, 1964, 1965); Torneio Rio – São Paulo (1959, 1963, 1964); Campeonato Brasileiro Série A (1961, 1962, 1963, 1964, 1965); Intercontinental Cup (1962, 1963); Copa Libertadores (1962, 1963)	
Antoninho	Brazil	1966	1971	Campeonato Paulista (1967, 1968, 1969); Campeonato Brasileiro Série A (1968); Recopa Sudamericana (1968); Intercontinental Supercup (1968)	
Mauro Ramos de Oliveira	Brazil	1971	1972		
Jair da Rosa Pinto	Brazil	1972	1972		
Pepe	Brazil	1972	1974	Campeonato Paulista (1973)	
Tim	Brazil	1974	1975		
Pepe	Brazil	1975	1975		
Olavo	Brazil	1976	1976		
Alfredinho	Brazil	1976	1976		
José Duarte	Brazil	1976	1976		
Urubatão	Brazil	1977	1977		
Otto Glória	Brazil	1977	1977		
José Ramos Delgado	Argentina	1977	1978		
Mengálvio	Brazil	1978	1978		
Formiga	Brazil	1978	1979		
Clodoaldo	Brazil	1979	1979		
Hilton Chaves	Brazil	1979	1979		
Pepe	Brazil	1979	1980		
João Avelino	Brazil	1980	1980		
Sérgio Clérice	Brazil	1980	1981		
Coutinho	Brazil	1981	1981		
Daltro Menezes	Brazil	1981	1981		
Clodoaldo	Brazil	1982	1982		
Paulo Emílio	Brazil	1982	1982		
Cilinho	Brazil	1982	1982		
Formiga	Brazil	1982	1984		
Del Vecchio	Brazil	1984	1984		
Castilho	Brazil	1984	1985		
Júlio Espinosa	Brazil	1986	1986		
Formiga	Brazil	1986	1987		
Candinho	Brazil	1987	1987		
Geninho	Brazil	1987	1988		
Carlos Gainete	Brazil	1988	1988		
Marinho Peres	Brazil	1988	1989		
Raul Pratalli	Brazil	1989	1989		
Nicanor de Carvalho	Brazil	1989	1989		
Pepe	Brazil	1989	1990		
Cabralzinho	Brazil	1991	1991		
Ramiro Valente	Brazil	1991	1991		
Écio Pasca	Brazil	1991	1991		
Dé	Brazil	1991	1991		
Rubens Minelli	Brazil	1991	1992		
Geninho	Brazil	1992	1992		
Evaristo de Macedo	Brazil	1993	1993		
Antônio Lopes	Brazil	1993	1993		
Pepe	Brazil	1993	1994		
Serginho Chulapa	Brazil	1994	1994		
Joãozinho	Brazil	1994	1995		
Coutinho	Brazil	1995	1995		
Cabralzinho	Brazil	1995	1996		
Candinho	Brazil	1996	1996		
Orlando Amarelo	Brazil	1996	1996		
José Teixeira	Brazil	1996	1996		
Vanderlei Luxemburgo	Brazil	1997	1997		
Emerson Leão	Brazil	1998	1999		
Paulo Autuori	Brazil	1999	1999		
Carlos Alberto Silva	Brazil	1999	2000		
Giba	Brazil	2000	2000		
Carlos Alberto Parreira	Brazil	1 Jan 2000	31 Dec 2000		
Geninho	Brazil	2001	2001		
Serginho Chulapa	Brazil	2001	2001		
Cabralzinho	Brazil	2001	2001		
Celso Roth	Brazil	1 Jan 2002	16 May 2002		
Emerson Leão	Brazil	2002	5 May 2004	Campeonato Brasileiro Série A (2002)	
Vanderlei Luxemburgo	Brazil	8 May 2004	29 Dec 2004	Campeonato Brasileiro Série A (2004)	
Oswaldo de Oliveira	Brazil	2005	2005		
Gallo	Brazil	22 Mar 2005	26 Sep 2005		
Nelsinho Baptista	Brazil	27 Sep 2005	15 Nov 2005		
Serginho Chulapa (interim)	Brazil	2005	2005		
Vanderlei Luxemburgo	Brazil	13 Dec 2005	31 Dec 2007	Campeonato Paulista (2006, 2007)	
Emerson Leão	Brazil	16 Dec 2007	26 May 2008		
Cuca	Brazil	3 Jun 2008	7 Aug 2008		
Márcio Fernandes	Brazil	9 Aug 2008	12 Feb 2009		
Vagner Mancini	Brazil	14 Feb 2009	13 Jul 2009		
Serginho Chulapa (interim)	Brazil	14 Jul 2009	16 Jul 2009		
Vanderlei Luxemburgo	Brazil	17 Jul 2009	7 Dec 2009		
Dorival Júnior	Brazil	12 Dec 2009	22 Sep 2010	Campeonato Paulista (2010); Copa do Brasil (2010)	
Marcelo Martelotte (interim)	Brazil	22 Sep 2010	31 Dec 2010		
Adilson Batista	Brazil	1 Jan 2011	27 Feb 2011		
Marcelo Martelotte (interim)	Brazil	2011	2011		
Muricy Ramalho	Brazil	8 Apr 2011	31 May 2013	Campeonato Paulista (2011, 2012); Copa Libertadores (2011); Recopa Sudamericana (2012)	
Claudinei Oliveira	Brazil	1 Jun 2013	31 Dec 2013		
Oswaldo de Oliveira	Brazil	11 Dec 2013	1 Sep 2014		
Enderson Moreira	Brazil	3 Sep 2014	5 Mar 2015		
Marcelo Fernandes	Brazil	5 Mar 2015	12 Jul 2015	Campeonato Paulista (2015)	
Dorival Júnior	Brazil	12 Jul 2015	4 Jun 2017	Campeonato Paulista (2016)	
Elano (interim)	Brazil	4 Jun 2017	6 Jun 2017		
Levir Culpi	Brazil	6 Jun 2017	28 Oct 2017		
Elano (interim)	Brazil	28 Oct 2017	31 Dec 2017		
Jair Ventura	Brazil	3 Jan 2018	23 Jul 2018		
Serginho Chulapa (interim)	Brazil	23 Jul 2018	30 Jul 2018		
Cuca	Brazil	30 Jul 2018	2 Dec 2018		
Jorge Sampaoli	Argentina	17 Dec 2018	9 Dec 2019		
Jesualdo Ferreira	Portugal	23 Dec 2019	5 Aug 2020		
Cuca	Brazil	7 Aug 2020	21 Feb 2021		
Marcelo Fernandes (interim)	Brazil	22 Feb 2021	3 Mar 2021		
Ariel Holan	Argentina	22 Feb 2021	26 Apr 2021		
Fernando Diniz	Brazil	7 May 2021	5 Sep 2021		
Fábio Carille	Brazil	8 Sep 2021	18 Feb 2022		
Marcelo Fernandes (interim)	Brazil	18 Feb 2022	25 Feb 2022		
Fabián Bustos	Argentina	26 Feb 2022	7 Jul 2022		
Marcelo Fernandes (interim)	Brazil	7 Jul 2022	19 Jul 2022		
Lisca	Brazil	19 Jul 2022	12 Sep 2022		
Orlando Ribeiro (interim)	Brazil	12 Sep 2022	13 Nov 2022		
Odair Hellmann	Brazil	16 Nov 2022	22 Jun 2023		
Paulo Turra	Brazil	23 Jun 2023	6 Aug 2023		
Diego Aguirre	Uruguay	6 Aug 2023	15 Sep 2023		
Marcelo Fernandes	Brazil	15 Sep 2023	6 Dec 2023		
Fábio Carille	Brazil	19 Dec 2023	18 Nov 2024	Campeonato Brasileiro Série B (2024)	
Leandro Zago (interim)	Brazil	18 Nov 2024	23 Dec 2024		
Pedro Caixinha	Portugal	23 Dec 2024	14 Apr 2025		
César Sampaio (interim)	Brazil	14 Apr 2025	29 Apr 2025		
Cleber Xavier	Brazil	29 Apr 2025	17 Aug 2025		
Juan Pablo Vojvoda	Argentina	22 Aug 2025	19 Mar 2026		
Cuca	Brazil	19 Mar 2026	present		
