= Rildo (footballer, born 1942) =

Brazilian footballer (1942–2021)

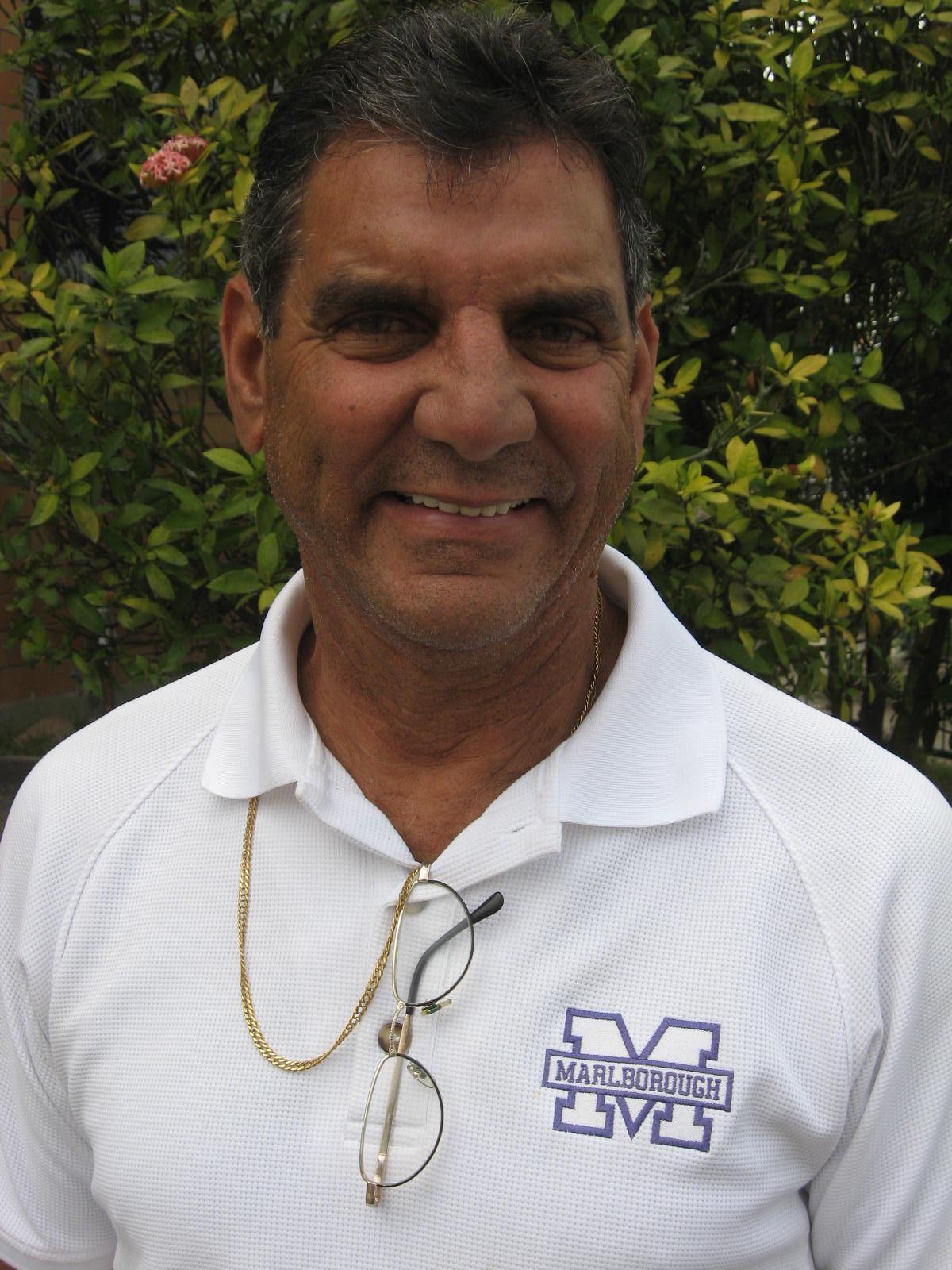
- Rildo in 2010

Personal information
- Full name: Rildo da Costa Menezes
- Date of birth: 23 January 1942
- Place of birth: Recife, Brazil
- Date of death: 16 May 2021 (aged 79)
- Place of death: Los Angeles, CA, USA
- Height: 5 ft 8 in (1.73 m)
- Position: Left-back

Youth career
- 1959: Ibis

Senior career*
Years	Team	Apps	(Gls)
1960	Sport		
1961–1966	Botafogo		
1967–1972	Santos		
1973–1976	CEUB		
1977	New York Cosmos	12	(0)
1978	Southern California Lazers	24	(0)
1978–1979	Cleveland Force (indoor)	16	(2)
1979	California Sunshine		
1980	Cleveland Cobras		

International career
1963–1969	Brazil	38	(1)

Managerial career
- 1990: California Emperors
- 1993: Los Angeles Salsa
- 1995: San Fernando Valley Golden Eagles
- * Club domestic league appearances and goals

Rildo da Costa Menezes (23 January 1942 – 16 May 2021), also known as Rildo, was a Brazilian professional footballer who played as a left-back.

== Club career ==
Rildo was the last of Santos Golden Era players, which included Pelé, Pepe, Coutinho, Clodoaldo and many others. His career began in 1959 when he signed a youth contract with Botafogo. In 1961 he began his senior career with Botafogo, two times winner in 1961 and 1962, and Brazilian Championship in 1963. In 1967, he transferred to Santos FC. Three time winner of Săo Paulo State Championship he captained the team that won (1967, 1968, 1969). From 1963 to 1970, he played for the Brazil national team. In 1977, he joined Pelé with the New York Cosmos of the North American Soccer League. In 1978, he played for the Southern California Lazers of the American Soccer League and was selected to the ASL all-star team that season. In 1979, he played for the California Sunshine. On 16 April 1980, he signed with the Cleveland Cobras of the American Soccer League.

== International career ==
Rildo earned 49 caps, scoring one goal, with the Brazil national team from 1963 to 1969. He was a member of the Brazilian team at the 1966 FIFA World Cup where he scored his lone national team goal in a 3–1 loss to Portugal.

== Coaching career ==
In 1990, Rildo coached the California Emperors. In 1993, he coached the Los Angeles Salsa of the American Professional Soccer League. In October 1993, he resigned after the team lost the championship game. In 1995, he coached the San Fernando Valley Golden Eagles of the USISL.

Rildo was an assistant coach with the Marlborough High School soccer team where he oversaw the junior varsity. He assisted professional British Head Coach Gareth Pashley to their most successful season in the High School's history.

== Death ==
Rildo died in Los Angeles on 16 May 2021, aged 79.

== Honours ==
Botafogo FR

- Campeonato Carioca: 1961, 1962
- Torneio Rio-São Paulo: 1962, 1966

Santos FC

- Campeonato Paulista: 1967, 1968 e 1969
- Recopa Sudamericana: 1968
- Intercontinental Champions' Supercup: 1968.
- Campeonato Brasileiro: 1968

New York Cosmos

- NASL: 1977
