= List of Santos FC records and statistics =

Santos FC is a football club based in Santos, that competes in the Campeonato Paulista, São Paulo's state league, and the Campeonato Brasileiro Série A or Brasileirão, Brazil's national league. The club was founded in 1912 by the initiative of three sports enthusiasts from Santos by the names of Raimundo Marques, Mário Ferraz de Campos, and Argemiro de Souza Júnior, and played its first friendly match on 23 June 1912. Initially Santos played against other local clubs in the city and state championships, but in 1959 the club became one of the founding members of the Taça Brasil, Brazil's first truly national league.

Santos has amassed various records since the foundation. Regionally, domestically, and continentally, they have set several records in winning various official and unofficial competitions. On 20 January 1998, Santos became the first in the history of football to reach the milestone of 10,000 goals, scored by Jorginho. It is one of Brazil's richest football club in terms of revenue, with an annual revenue of $45.1m (€31.5m), and one of the most valuable clubs, worth over $86.7m (€60.6m) in 2011. The Santista club is the most successful club in Brazilian football in terms of overall trophies, having won nine national, six continental and three international titles. In 1962, Santos became the first club in the world to win the continental treble consisting of the Paulista, Taça Brasil, and the Copa Libertadores. That same year, it also became the first football club ever to win four out of four competitions in a single year, thus completing the quadruple, comprising the aforementioned treble and the Intercontinental Cup.

Santos has employed several famous players, with eleven FIFA World Cup, six Copa América and one FIFA Confederations Cup winners among the previous and current Santos players. Arnaldo Patusca was the first Santista player to participate with the national team during the 1916 Copa América. Araken Patusca was the first player from the club to participate with Brazil at a World Cup in 1930. The first Peixe to participate with the national team at the Confederations Cup was Léo at the 2001 FIFA Confederations Cup. Pelé, often ranked as the greatest player of all time, was voted South American footballer of the year in 1973, won the FIFA World Cup Best Young Player award in 1958 and FIFA World Cup Golden Ball in 1970. Pepe is often considered one of the greatest wingers of all time, and is the player who won the most Brasileirãos, with seven titles in total. He has also won the most Campeonato Paulistas, with 13 titles in total, and is the only player to spend his entire player career with Santos. Coutinho, considered one of the greatest forwards in the sport, was the top scorer during Santos' victorious campaign during the 1962 Copa Libertadores and scored Santos' 5000th goal in a 10–2 rout of Guarani in 1961.

== Honours ==
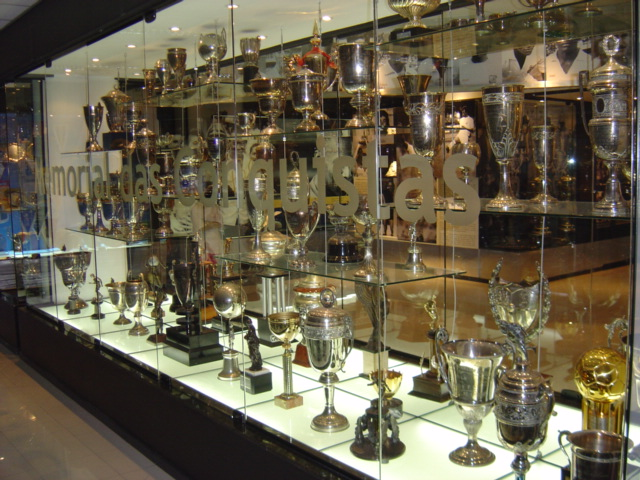
Santos' memorial of conquests

Santos won their first trophy in 1913, a year after its founding, when they won the Campeonato Santista, a football championship between clubs of the city of Santos. The club won the Campeonato Santista again in 1915 under the name União Futebol Clube. Santos participated in the Campeonato Paulista, for the first time, in 1913 and won it for the first time in 1935.

Even when the national league was established in 1959, the importance of the state leagues remained high. The Campeonato Santista, however, became an amateur event in 1941. As of 2010, Santos is one of only five clubs never to have been relegated from the top level of Brazilian football, the others being São Paulo, Flamengo, Internacional and Cruzeiro.

The club is also the highest scoring team in history, with 11,875 goals (as of 1 December 2012), and one of the most recognized football clubs in the world, having won nine international trophies, making them the seventh most successful team in South America for official international competitions won, all recognized by CONMEBOL; it also has the record in Campeonato Brasileiro Série A titles, alongside Palmeiras (with 8), Supercopa Sudamericana and Intercontinental Supercup titles.

International

- Intercontinental Cup (2): 1962, 1963
- Intercontinental Supercup (1): 1968

Continental

- Copa Libertadores (3): 1962, 1963, 2011
- Copa CONMEBOL (1): 1998
- Recopa Sudamericana (1): 2012
- Supercopa Sudamericana (1): 1968

National

- Campeonato Brasileiro Série A (8): 1961, 1962, 1963, 1964, 1965, 1968, 2002, 2004
- Copa do Brasil (1): 2010
- Torneio Rio – São Paulo (5): 1959, 1963, 1964, 1966, 1997

Regional

- Campeonato Paulista (22): 1935, 1955, 1956, 1958, 1960, 1961, 1962, 1964, 1965, 1967, 1968, 1969, 1973, 1978, 1984, 2006, 2007, 2010, 2011, 2012, 2015, 2016
- Copa Paulista de Futebol (1): 2004

=== Doubles and Trebles ===
- The Double

Domestic Double (5)

State and Cup: 2010
State and League: 1961, 1964, 1965, 1968

Continental Double (2)

State and Copa Libertadores: 2011
League and Copa Libertadores: 1963

- The Treble

Continental Treble (1)

State, League and Copa Libertadores: 1962

Especially short competitions such as the Recopa Sudamericana, Intercontinental Cup (now defunct), or FIFA Club World Cup are not generally considered to contribute towards a Double or Treble.

All titles can be seen in the official site of the club.
