= 1968 Intercontinental Supercup =

Tournament details
- Dates: 13 November 1968 – 24 June 1969
- Teams: 5 (1 withdrew)

Final positions
- Champions: (Brazil) Santos (1st title)
- Runners-up: (Italy) Internazionale

Tournament statistics
- Matches played: 7

The 1968 Intercontinental Supercup was the first edition of the Intercontinental Supercup, a football competition between the European and South American past winners of the Intercontinental Cup. The final tie was contested in June 1969 between Italian club Internazionale and Brazilian club Santos. The first leg ended with the Santásticos beating Inter 1–0 at Milan's San Siro. A second leg was planned to be played but Inter rejected the invitation, and Santos were declared the winners.

== Participating clubs ==
Club	Qualification method
(Spain) Real Madrid	Winner of the 1960 Intercontinental Cup
(Italy) Internazionale	Winner of the 1964, 1965 Intercontinental Cup
(Uruguay) Peñarol	Winner of the 1961, 1966 Intercontinental Cup
(Brazil) Santos	Winner of the 1962, 1963 Intercontinental Cup
(Argentina) Racing	Winner of the 1967 Intercontinental Cup

== South American zone qualifiers ==
This South American zone tournament was contested between 13 November 1968 and 22 May 1969, between Peñarol, Santos, and Racing, the three South American winners of the Intercontinental Cup to date. Santos won the group and qualified to the final stage.

=== Standings ===
Team	Pld	W	D	L	GF	GA	GD	Pts
(Brazil) Santos	4	3	0	1	6	5	+1	6
(Uruguay) Peñarol	4	2	1	1	7	2	+5	5
(Argentina) Racing	4	0	1	3	3	9	−6	1

=== Matches ===
13 November 1968	Peñarol (Uruguay)	3–0	(Argentina) Racing	Montevideo
	Rocha 38'; Spencer 58'; Carrera 84'			Stadium: Estadio Centenario; Referee: Romualdo Arppi Filho (Brazil)

19 November 1968	Santos (Brazil)	2–0	(Argentina) Racing	São Paulo
	Pelé 35'; Edu 57'			Stadium: Estádio Parque Antárctica; Referee: Esteban Marino (Uruguay)

21 November 1968	Santos (Brazil)	1–0	(Uruguay) Peñarol	Rio de Janeiro
	Clodoaldo 68'			Stadium: Estádio Jornalista Mário Filho (Maracanã); Referee: Aurelio Bossolino (Argentina)

16 April 1969	Racing (Argentina)	2–3	(Brazil) Santos	Avellaneda
	da Silva 10', 87'		Guerreiro 47', 52'; Negreiros 88'	Stadium: Estadio Presidente Perón (El Cilindro); Referee: Armando Pena Rocha (Uruguay)

19 April 1969	Peñarol (Uruguay)	3–0	(Brazil) Santos	Montevideo
	Ramos ?' (o.g.); Rocha 56', 70' (pen.)			Stadium: Estadio Centenario; Referee: Guillermo Nimo (Argentina)

22 May 1969	Racing (Argentina)	1–1	(Uruguay) Peñarol	Avellaneda
	da Silva 44'		Basile 12' (o.g.)	Stadium: Estadio Presidente Perón (El Cilindro); Referee: Arnaldo Cézar Coelho (Brazil)

== European zone qualifiers ==
As the only two European winners of the Intercontinental Cup, Inter and Real Madrid were eligible for the competition. However, Real Madrid withdrew from the tournament, leaving Inter to face the South American zone winner.

== Final ==
=== First leg ===
1968 Intercontinental Supercup final
24 June 1969
First leg

Internazionale (Italy)	0–1	(Brazil) Santos
		Guerreiro 57'

San Siro, Milan
Attendance: 44,774
Referee: José Ortiz de Mendibil (Spain)

Inter	Santos

GK	(Italy) Ivano Bordon
DF	(Italy) Tarcisio Burgnich
DF	(Italy) Cesare Poli
MF	(Italy) Gianfranco Bedin
MF	(Italy) Aristide Guarneri
MF	(Italy) Giancarlo Cella
FW	(Brazil) Jair
FW	(Italy) Sandro Mazzola
FW	(Italy) Angelo Domenghini
FW	(Italy) Mario Corso
FW	(Italy) Giovanni Vastola
Manager:
(Italy) Maino Neri

GK	(Brazil) Cláudio	(substituted off) 14'
RB	(Brazil) Carlos Alberto Torres
CB	(Argentina) José Ramos Delgado
CB	(Brazil) Djalma Dias
LB	(Brazil) Rildo
MF	(Brazil) Clodoaldo
MF	(Brazil) Negreiros
FW	(Brazil) Toninho Guerreiro
FW	(Brazil) Edu
FW	(Brazil) Pelé
FW	(Brazil) Abel
Substitutes:
GK	(Brazil) Laércio	(substituted in) 14'
Manager:
(Brazil) Antoninho

=== Second leg ===
September 1969
Second leg

Santos (Brazil)	(cancelled)	(Italy) Internazionale

As Inter withdrew from the second leg, Santos was declared the winner.

== Goalscorers ==
3 goals

- (Uruguay) Pedro Rocha (Peñarol)
- (Brazil) Wálter Machado da Silva (Racing)
- (Brazil) Toninho Guerreiro (Santos)

1 goal

- (Ecuador) Polo Carrera (Peñarol)
- (Brazil) Edú (Santos)
- (Brazil) Negreiros (Santos)
- (Brazil) Pelé (Santos)
- (Ecuador) Alberto Spencer (Peñarol)

Own goals

- (Argentina) Alfio Basile (Racing; for Peñarol)
- (Argentina) José Ramos Delgado (Santos; for Peñarol)

== See also ==
- Inter Milan in international football competitions
- Santos FC in international football competitions
