= Cláudio (footballer, born 1940) =

Brazilian footballer

Personal information
- Full name: Cláudio César de Aguiar Mauriz
- Date of birth: 22 August 1940
- Place of birth: Rio de Janeiro, Brazil
- Date of death: 24 July 1979 (aged 38)
- Place of death: New York City, New York, United States
- Position: Goalkeeper

Senior career*
Years	Team	Apps	(Gls)
1961	Fluminense		
1962	Olaria		
1963–1964	Bonsucesso		
1965–1973	Santos	225	(0)
Total		225+	(0+)

International career
1968–1972	Brazil	7	(0)
- * Club domestic league appearances and goals

Cláudio César de Aguiar Mauriz (22 August 1940 – 24 July 1979), known simply as Cláudio, was a Brazilian international footballer who played as a goalkeeper.

== Honours ==
Santos

- Intercontinental Supercup: 1968
- Recopa Sudamericana: 1968
- Taça Brasil: 1965
- Torneio Rio – São Paulo: 1966 (split)
- Campeonato Paulista: 1967, 1968, 1969, 1973 (split)
