= Santos FC in South America =

Santos FC in international football
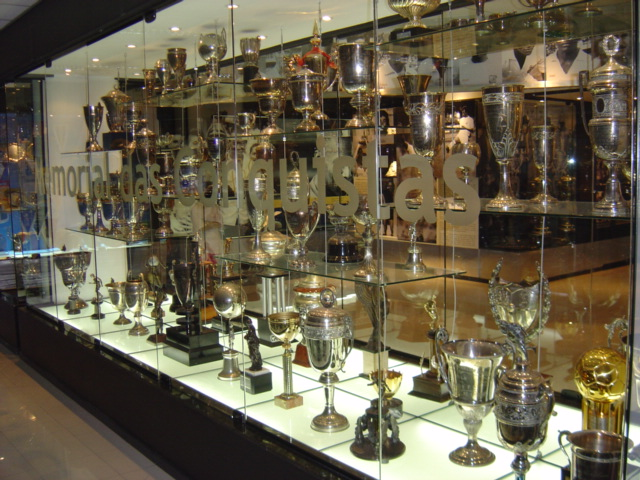
- Santos's trophy room, including its eight international titles
- Club: Santos
- First entry: 1962 Copa Libertadores
- Latest entry: 2020 Copa Libertadores

Titles
- Intercontinental Cup: 2: 1962; 1963
- Copa Libertadores: 3: 1962; 1963; 2011
- Copa CONMEBOL: 1: 1998
- Recopa Sudamericana: 1: 2012
- Recopa Intercontinental: 1: 1968

Santos FC is a football club based in Santos, that competes in the Campeonato Paulista, São Paulo's state league, and the Campeonato Brasileiro Série A or B, Brazil's national league. The club was founded in 1912 by the initiative of three sports enthusiasts from Santos by the names of Raimundo Marques, Mário Ferraz de Campos, and Argemiro de Souza Júnior, and played its first friendly match on June 23, 1914. Initially Santos played against other local clubs in the city and state championships, but in 1959 the club became one of the founding members of the Taça Brasil, Brazil's first truly national league. Up until 2023, Santos was one of only five clubs never to have been relegated from the top level of Brazilian football, the others being São Paulo and Flamengo.

The club first participated in an international competition in 1956. The first international cup they took part in was the Torneio Internacional da FPF. Santos is the most successful club in the Brasileirão, alongside Palmeiras, and was voted by FIFA as the 5th most successful football club of the 20th century. The Santista club is the most successful club, alongside São Paulo, in Brazilian football in terms of overall trophies, having won 19 state titles, a record 8 national titles, 3 Copa Libertadores, 2 Intercontinental Cups, 1 Recopa Sudamericana, 1 Intercontinental Supercup, 1 Copa CONMEBOL and 1 Copa do Brasil. In 1962, Santos became the first club in the world to win the continental treble consisting of the Paulista, Taça Brasil, and the Copa Libertadores.

== Flag legend ==
- Acre
- Alagoas
- Algeria
- Antwerp
- / Argentina
- Australia
- Austria
- Bahia
- Bahrain
- Bangkok
- Bavaria
- Belgium
- Bolivia
- Bosnia and Herzegovina
- / / Brazil
- Bulgaria
- Cameroon
- Canada
- Ceará
- Chile
- China
- Cochabamba
- Colombia
- Congo
- Costa Rica
- Côte d'Ivoire
- Croatia
- Czechoslovakia
- Distrito Federal
- East Germany
- Ecuador
- El Salvador
- England
- Enschede
- France
- Gabon
- Genoa
- Goiás
- Greece
- Guadeloupe
- Guatemala
- Haiti
- Hamburg
- Hong Kong
- Hungary
- Indonesia
- Iran
- Ireland
- Israel
- Italy
- Jamaica
- Japan
- João Monlevade
- Kuwait
- Malaysia
- Maranhão
- Marseille
- Martinique
- Mato Grosso do Sul
- Mexico
- Minas Gerais
- Netherlands
- Netherlands Antilles
- Niedersachsen
- Nigeria
- Pará
- / Paraguay
- Paraná
- Pernambuco
- Peru
- Piracicaba
- Poland
- Portugal
- Qatar
- Rio de Janeiro
- Rio Grande do Norte
- Rio Grande do Sul
- Romania
- San Marino
- Saarland
- São Paulo
- Scotland
- Senegal
- Santa Catarina
- Saudi Arabia
- Serbia
- Sergipe
- South Africa
- South Korea
- Soviet Union
- Suriname
- Spain
- Sweden
- Switzerland
- Thailand
- Trinidad & Tobago
- Turkey
- United Kingdom
- United States
- Uruguay
- Venezuela
- West Berlin
- West Germany / Germany

== International seasons ==
=== Copa Libertadores ===
The Copa Libertadores, originally known as the Copa Campeones de América, is an annual international club football competition organized by CONMEBOL since 1960. It is the most prestigious club competition in South American football and one of the most watched events in the world, broadcast in 135 nations worldwide. The tournament is named in honor of the Libertadores (Portuguese and Spanish for Liberators), the main leaders of the South American wars of independence. The competition has had several different formats over its lifetime. Initially, only the champions of the South American leagues participated. In 1966, the runners-up of the South American leagues began to join; in 1998, Mexican teams were invited to compete. Today at least three clubs per country compete in the tournament, while Argentina and Brazil each have five clubs participating. Traditionally, a group stage has always been used but the number of teams per group has varied several times.

The tournament consists of six stages. In the present format, it begins in early February with the first stage. The six surviving teams from the first stage join 26 teams in the second stage, in which there are eight groups consisting of four teams each. The eight group winners and eight runners-up enter the final four stages, better known as the knockout stages, which ends with the finals anywhere between June and August. The winner of the Copa Libertadores becomes eligible to play in two extra tournaments: the FIFA Club World Cup and the Recopa Sudamericana. The reigning champion of the competition is Santos FC. This is the club's third title and the first in 49 years. Santos have participated in the Copa Libertadores 15 times, reaching the semifinals nine times and the final five times.

Year	Stage	Match	Opposing team	Score	Venue
1962	First round	Match 3	(Bolivia) Deportivo Municipal	4–3	Estadio Hernando Siles, La Paz, Bolivia
1962	First round	Match 4	(Bolivia) Deportivo Municipal	6–1	Estádio Vila Belmiro, Santos, Brazil
1962	First round	Match 5	(Paraguay) Cerro Porteño	1–1	Estadio Defensores del Chaco, Asunción, Paraguay
1962	First round	Match 6	(Paraguay) Cerro Porteño	9–1	Estádio Vila Belmiro, Santos, Brazil
1962	Semifinal	1st leg	(Chile) Universidad Católica	1–1	Estadio Independencia, Santiago, Chile
1962	Semifinal	2nd leg	(Chile) Universidad Católica	1–0	Estádio Vila Belmiro, Santos, Brazil
1962	Final	1st leg	(Uruguay) Peñarol	2–1	Estadio Centenario, Montevideo, Uruguay
1962	Final	2nd leg	(Uruguay) Peñarol	2–3	Estádio Vila Belmiro, Santos, Brazil
1962	Final	Playoff	(Uruguay) Peñarol	3–0	Estadio Antonio Liberti, Buenos Aires, Argentina
1963	Semifinal	1st leg	(Brazil) Botafogo	1–1	Pacaembu, São Paulo, Brazil
1963	Semifinal	2nd leg	(Brazil) Botafogo	4–0	Maracanã, Rio de Janeiro, Brazil
1963	Final	1st leg	(Argentina) Boca Juniors	3–2	Maracanã, Rio de Janeiro, Brazil
1963	Final	2nd leg	(Argentina) Boca Juniors	2–1	Estadio Alberto Armando, Buenos Aires, Argentina
1964	Semifinal	1st leg	(Argentina) Independiente	2–3	Maracanã, Rio de Janeiro, Brazil
1964	Semifinal	2nd leg	(Argentina) Independiente	1–2	Estadio Libertadores de América, Avellaneda, Argentina
1965	First round	Match 1	Universidad de Chile	5–1	Estadio Nacional, Santiago, Chile
1965	First round	Match 2	(Peru) Universitario	2–1	Estadio Nacional, Lima, Peru
1965	First round	Match 4	Universidad de Chile	1–0	Pacaembu, São Paulo, Brazil
1965	First round	Match 5	(Peru) Universitario	2–1	Pacaembu, São Paulo, Brazil
1965	Semifinal	1st leg	(Uruguay) Peñarol	5–4	Pacaembu, São Paulo, Brazil
1965	Semifinal	2nd leg	(Uruguay) Peñarol	2–3	Estadio Centenario, Montevideo, Uruguay
1965	Semifinal	Playoff	(Uruguay) Peñarol	1–2	Estadio Antonio Liberti, Buenos Aires, Argentina
1984	First round	Match 1	(Brazil) Flamengo	1–4	Maracanã, Rio de Janeiro, Brazil
1984	First round	Match 5	(Colombia) Junior	3–0	Estadio Romelio Martínez, Barranquilla, Colombia
1984	First round	Match 6	(Colombia) América de Cali	0–1	Estadio Olímpico Pascual Guerrero, Cali, Colombia
1984	First round	Match 8	(Brazil) Flamengo	0–5	Morumbi, São Paulo, Brazil
1984	First round	Match 9	(Colombia) América de Cali	0–1	Morumbi, São Paulo, Brazil
1984	First round	Match 11	(Colombia) Junior	1–3	Morumbi, São Paulo, Brazil
2003	Group stage	Match 2	(Colombia) América de Cali	5–1	Estadio Olímpico Pascual Guerrero, Cali, Colombia
2003	Group stage	Match 3	(Paraguay) 12 de Octubre	3–1	Estádio Vila Belmiro, Santos, Brazil
2003	Group stage	Match 6	(Ecuador) El Nacional	0–0	Estadio Olímpico Atahualpa, Quito, Ecuador
2003	Group stage	Match 8	(Colombia) América de Cali	3–0	Estádio Vila Belmiro, Santos, Brazil
2003	Group stage	Match 9	(Paraguay) 12 de Octubre	4–1	Estadio Antonio Oddone Sarubbi, Ciudad del Este, Paraguay
2003	Group stage	Match 12	(Ecuador) El Nacional	1–1	Estádio Vila Belmiro, Santos, Brazil
2003	Round of 16	1st leg	(Uruguay) Nacional	4–4	Estadio Centenario, Montevideo, Uruguay
2003	Round of 16	2nd leg	(Uruguay) Nacional	2–2 (3–1 pks)	Estádio Vila Belmiro, Santos, Brazil
2003	Quarterfinal	1st leg	(Mexico) Cruz Azul	2–2	Estadio Azteca, Mexico City, Mexico
2003	Quarterfinal	2nd leg	(Mexico) Cruz Azul	1–0	Estádio Vila Belmiro, Santos, Brazil
2003	Semifinal	1st leg	(Colombia) Independiente Medellín	1–0	Estádio Vila Belmiro, Santos, Brazil
2003	Semifinal	2nd leg	(Colombia) Independiente Medellín	3–2	Estadio Atanasio Girardot, Medellín, Colombia
2003	Final	1st leg	(Argentina) Boca Juniors	0–2	Estadio Alberto Armando, Buenos Aires, Argentina
2003	Final	2nd leg	(Argentina) Boca Juniors	1–3	Morumbi, São Paulo, Brazil
2004	Group stage	Match 2	(Bolivia) Jorge Wilstermann	3–2	Estadio Félix Capriles, Cochabamba, Bolivia
2004	Group stage	Match 4	(Paraguay) Guaraní	2–2	Estádio Vila Belmiro, Santos, Brazil
2004	Group stage	Match 6	(Ecuador) Barcelona SC	3–1	Estadio Monumental Isidro Romero Carbo, Guayaquil, Ecuador
2004	Group stage	Match 7	(Ecuador) Barcelona SC	1–0	Estádio Vila Belmiro, Santos, Brazil
2004	Group stage	Match 10	(Paraguay) Guaraní	2–1	Estadio Rogelio Livieres, Asunción, Paraguay
2004	Group stage	Match 11	(Bolivia) Jorge Wilstermann	5–0	Estádio Vila Belmiro, Santos, Brazil
2004	Round of 16	1st leg	(Ecuador) Liga de Quito	2–4	La Casa Blanca, Quito, Ecuador
2004	Round of 16	2nd leg	(Ecuador) Liga de Quito	2–0 (5–3 pks)	Estádio Vila Belmiro, Santos, Brazil
2004	Quarterfinal	1st leg	(Colombia) Once Caldas	1–1	Estádio Vila Belmiro, Santos, Brazil
2004	Quarterfinal	2nd leg	(Colombia) Once Caldas	0–1	Estadio Palogrande, Manizales, Colombia
2005	Group stage	Match 1	(Bolivia) Bolívar	3–4	Estadio Hernando Siles, La Paz, Bolivia
2005	Group stage	Match 3	(Uruguay) Danubio	3–2	Estádio Vila Belmiro, Santos, Brazil
2005	Group stage	Match 6	(Ecuador) Liga de Quito	1–2	La Casa Blanca, Quito, Ecuador
2005	Group stage	Match 7	(Ecuador) Liga de Quito	3–1	Estádio Vila Belmiro, Santos, Brazil
2005	Group stage	Match 9	(Uruguay) Danubio	2–1	Estadio Luis Franzini, Montevideo, Uruguay
2005	Group stage	Match 12	(Bolivia) Bolívar	6–0	Estádio Vila Belmiro, Santos, Brazil
2005	Round of 16	1st leg	Universidad de Chile	1–2	Estadio Nacional, Santiago, Chile
2005	Round of 16	2nd leg	Universidad de Chile	3–0	Estádio Vila Belmiro, Santos, Brazil
2005	Quarterfinal	1st leg	(Brazil) Atlético Paranaense	2–3	Arena da Baixada, Curitiba, Brazil
2005	Quarterfinal	2nd leg	(Brazil) Atlético Paranaense	0–2	Estádio Vila Belmiro, Santos, Brazil
2007	Group stage	Match 2	(Colombia) Deportivo Pasto	1–0	Estadio Departamental Libertad, Pasto, Colombia
2007	Group stage	Match 3	(Uruguay) Defensor Sporting	1–0	Estádio Vila Belmiro, Santos, Brazil
2007	Group stage	Match 5	(Argentina) Gimnasia	3–0	Estádio Vila Belmiro, Santos, Brazil
2007	Group stage	Match 7	(Argentina) Gimnasia	2–1	Estadio Ciudad de La Plata, La Plata, Argentina
2007	Group stage	Match 9	(Uruguay) Defensor Sporting	2–0	Estadio Centenario, Montevideo, Uruguay
2007	Group stage	Match 12	(Colombia) Deportivo Pasto	3–0	Estádio Vila Belmiro, Santos, Brazil
2007	Round of 16	1st leg	(Venezuela) Caracas	2–2	Estadio Olímpico, Caracas, Venezuela
2007	Round of 16	2nd leg	(Venezuela) Caracas	3–2	Estádio Vila Belmiro, Santos, Brazil
2007	Quarterfinal	1st leg	(Mexico) Club América	0–0	Estadio Azteca, Mexico City, Mexico
2007	Quarterfinal	2nd leg	(Mexico) Club América	2–1	Estádio Vila Belmiro, Santos, Brazil
2007	Semifinal	1st leg	(Brazil) Grêmio	0–2	Estádio Olímpico Monumental, Porto Alegre, Brazil
2007	Semifinal	2nd leg	(Brazil) Grêmio	3–1 (a)	Estádio Vila Belmiro, Santos, Brazil
2008	Group stage	Match 1	(Colombia) Cúcuta Deportivo	0–0	Estadio General Santander, Cúcuta, Colombia
2008	Group stage	Match 4	(Mexico) Chivas	1–0	Estádio Vila Belmiro, Santos, Brazil
2008	Group stage	Match 6	(Bolivia) San José	1–2	Estadio Jesús Bermúdez, Oruro, Bolivia
2008	Group stage	Match 8	(Bolivia) San José	7–0	Estádio Vila Belmiro, Santos, Brazil
2008	Group stage	Match 10	(Mexico) Chivas	2–3	Estadio Jalisco, Guadalajara, Mexico
2008	Group stage	Match 12	(Colombia) Cúcuta Deportivo	2–1	Estádio Vila Belmiro, Santos, Brazil
2008	Round of 16	1st leg	(Colombia) Cúcuta Deportivo	2–0	Estádio Vila Belmiro, Santos, Brazil
2008	Round of 16	2nd leg	(Colombia) Cúcuta Deportivo	2–0	Estadio General Santander, Cúcuta, Colombia
2008	Quarterfinal	1st leg	(Mexico) Club América	0–2	Estadio Azteca, Mexico City, Mexico
2008	Quarterfinal	2nd leg	(Mexico) Club América	1–0	Estádio Vila Belmiro, Santos, Brazil
2011	Group stage	Match 1	(Venezuela) Deportivo Táchira	0–0	Estadio Polideportivo de Pueblo Nuevo, San Cristóbal, Venezuela
2011	Group stage	Match 4	(Paraguay) Cerro Porteño	1–1	Estádio Vila Belmiro, Santos, Brazil
2011	Group stage	Match 6	(Chile) Colo-Colo	2–3	Estadio Monumental, Santiago, Chile
2011	Group stage	Match 8	(Chile) Colo-Colo	3–2	Estádio Vila Belmiro, Santos, Brazil
2011	Group stage	Match 10	(Paraguay) Cerro Porteño	2–1	Estadio General Pablo Rojas, Asunción, Paraguay
2011	Group stage	Match 12	(Venezuela) Deportivo Táchira	3–1	Pacaembu, São Paulo, Brazil
2011	Round of 16	1st leg	(Mexico) Club América	1–0	Estádio Vila Belmiro, Santos, Brazil
2011	Round of 16	2nd leg	(Mexico) Club América	0–0	Estadio Corregidora, Querétaro, Mexico
2011	Quarterfinal	1st leg	(Colombia) Once Caldas	1–0	Estadio Palogrande, Manizales, Colombia
2011	Quarterfinal	2nd leg	(Colombia) Once Caldas	1–1	Pacaembu, São Paulo, Brazil
2011	Semifinal	1st leg	(Paraguay) Cerro Porteño	1–0	Pacaembu, São Paulo, Brazil
2011	Semifinal	2nd leg	(Paraguay) Cerro Porteño	3–3	Estadio General Pablo Rojas, Asunción, Paraguay
2011	Final	1st leg	(Uruguay) Peñarol	0–0	Estadio Centenario, Montevideo, Uruguay
2011	Final	2nd leg	(Uruguay) Peñarol	2–1	Pacaembu, São Paulo, Brazil
2012	Group stage	Match 2	(Bolivia) The Strongest	1–2	Estadio Hernando Siles, La Paz, Bolivia
2012	Group stage	Match 4	(Brazil) Internacional	3–1	Estádio Vila Belmiro, Santos, Brazil
2012	Group stage	Match 6	(Peru) Juan Aurich	3–1	Estadio Elías Aguirre, Chiclayo, Peru
2012	Group stage	Match 8	(Peru) Juan Aurich	2–0	Pacaembu, São Paulo, Brazil
2012	Group stage	Match 9	(Brazil) Internacional	1–1	Estádio Beira–Rio, Porto Alegre, Brazil
2012	Group stage	Match 12	(Bolivia) The Strongest	2–0	Estádio Vila Belmiro, Chiclayo, Peru
2012	Round of 16	1st leg	(Bolivia) Bolívar	1–2	Estadio Hernando Siles, La Paz, Bolivia
2012	Round of 16	2nd leg	(Bolivia) Bolívar	8–0	Estádio Vila Belmiro, Santos, Brazil
2012	Quarterfinals	1st leg	(Argentina) Vélez Sársfield	0–1	Estadio José Amalfitani, Buenos Aires, Argentina
2012	Quarterfinals	2nd leg	(Argentina) Vélez Sársfield	1–0 (4–2)	Estádio Vila Belmiro, Santos, Brazil
2012	Semifinals	1st leg	(Brazil) Corinthians	0–1	Estádio Vila Belmiro, Santos, Brazil
2012	Semifinals	2nd leg	(Brazil) Corinthians	1–1	Pacaembu, São Paulo, Brazil
2017	Group stage	Match 2	(Peru) Sporting Cristal	1–1	Estadio Nacional de Lima, Lima, Peru
2017	Group stage	Match 4	(Bolivia) The Strongest	2–0	Estádio Vila Belmiro, Santos, Brazil
2017	Group stage	Match 6	(Colombia) Santa Fe	0–0	Estadio El Campín, Bogotá, Colombia
2017	Group stage	Match 8	(Colombia) Santa Fe	3–2	Pacaembu, São Paulo, Brazil
2017	Group stage	Match 10	(Bolivia) The Strongest	1–1	Estadio Hernando Siles, La Paz, Bolivia
2017	Group stage	Match 11	(Peru) Sporting Cristal	4–0	Estádio Vila Belmiro, Santos, Brazil
2017	Round of 16	1st leg	(Brazil) Atlético Paranaense	2–3	Estadio Vila Capanema, Curitiba, Brazil
2017	Round of 16	2nd leg	(Brazil) Atlético Paranaense	1–0	Estádio Vila Belmiro, Santos, Brazil
2017	Quarterfinals	1st leg	(Ecuador) Barcelona	1–1	Monumental Isidro Romero, Guayaquil, Ecuador
2017	Quarterfinals	2nd leg	(Ecuador) Barcelona	0–1	Estádio Vila Belmiro, Santos, Brazil
2018	Group stage	Match 1	(Peru) Real Garcilaso	0–2	Estadio Garcilaso, Cusco, Peru
2018	Group stage	Match 2	(Uruguay) Nacional	3–1	Pacaembu Stadium, São Paulo, Brazil
2018	Group stage	Match 3	(Argentina) Estudiantes	1–0	Estadio Centenario Ciudad de Quilmes, Quilmes, Argentina
2018	Group stage	Match 4	(Argentina) Estudiantes	2–0	Estádio Vila Belmiro, Santos, Brazil
2018	Group stage	Match 5	(Uruguay) Nacional	0–1	Estadio Gran Parque Central, Montevideo, Uruguay
2018	Group stage	Match 6	(Peru) Real Garcilaso	0–0	Estádio Vila Belmiro, Santos, Brazil
2018	Round of 16	1st leg	(Argentina) Independiente	0–0 (Note: Awarded a 0–3 loss due to Carlos Sánchez's illegal lineup)	Estadio Libertadores de América, Avellaneda, Argentina
2018	Round of 16	2nd leg	(Argentina) Independiente	0–0	Pacaembu Stadium, São Paulo, Brazil
2020	Group stage	Match 1	(Argentina) Defensa y Justicia	2–1	Estadio Norberto "Tito" Tomaghello, Florencio Varela, Argentina
2020	Group stage	Match 3	(Ecuador) Delfín	1–0	Estádio Vila Belmiro, Santos, Brazil
2020	Group stage	Match 5	(Paraguay) Olimpia	0–0	Estádio Vila Belmiro, Santos, Brazil
2020	Group stage	Match 8	(Ecuador) Delfín	2–1	Estadio Jocay, Manta, Ecuador
2020	Group stage	Match 9	(Paraguay) Olimpia	3–2	Estadio Manuel Ferreira, Asunción, Paraguay
2020	Group stage	Match 12	(Argentina) Defensa y Justicia	2–1	Estádio Vila Belmiro, Santos, Brazil
2020	Round of 16	1st leg	(Ecuador) LDU Quito	2–1	Estadio Rodrigo Paz Delgado, Quito, Ecuador
2020	Round of 16	2nd leg	(Ecuador) LDU Quito	0–1 (a)	Estadio Vila Belmiro, Santos, Brazil
2020	Quarterfinal	1st leg	(Brazil) Grêmio	1–1	Arena do Grêmio, Porto Alegre, Brazil
2020	Quarterfinal	2nd leg	(Brazil) Grêmio	4–1	Estadio Vila Belmiro, Santos, Brazil
2020	Semifinal	1st leg	(Argentina) Boca Juniors	0–0	La Bombonera, Buenos Aires, Argentina
2020	Semifinal	2nd leg	(Argentina) Boca Juniors	3–0	Estadio Vila Belmiro, Santos, Brazil
2020	Final		(Brazil) Palmeiras	0–1	Maracanã Stadium, Rio de Janeiro, Brazil
2021	Second stage	Match C5	(Venezuela) Deportivo Lara	2–1	Estádio Vila Belmiro, Santos, Brazil
2021	Second stage	Match C5	(Venezuela) Deportivo Lara	1–1	Estadio Olímpico de la UCV, Caracas, Venezuela
2021	Third stage	Match G4	(Argentina) San Lorenzo	3–1	Estadio Pedro Bidegain, Buenos Aires, Argentina
2021	Third stage	Match G4	(Argentina) San Lorenzo	2–2	Estádio Vila Belmiro, Santos, Brazil
2021	Group stage	Round 1	(Ecuador) Barcelona	0–2	Estádio Vila Belmiro, Santos, Brazil
2021	Group stage	Round 2	(Argentina) Boca Juniors	0–2	La Bombonera, Buenos Aires, Argentina
2021	Group stage	Round 3	(Bolivia) The Strongest	5–0	Estádio Vila Belmiro, Santos, Brazil
2021	Group stage	Round 4	(Argentina) Boca Juniors	1–0	Estádio Vila Belmiro, Santos, Brazil
2021	Group stage	Round 5	(Bolivia) The Strongest	1–2	Estadio Hernando Siles, La Paz, Bolivia
2021	Group stage	Round 6	(Ecuador) Barcelona	1–3	Estadio Monumental Isidro Romero Carbo, Guayaquil, Ecuador

=== Supercopa Sudamericana ===
The Supercopa Sudamericana was a club competition contested annually by the past winners of the Copa Libertadores. The cup is one of the many inter–South American club competitions that have been organised by CONMEBOL. The first competition was held in the 1988 season, and the last in 1997. Prior to its abolition, the Supercopa Sudamericana was regarded as the second most prestigious South American club competition out of the three major tournaments, behind the Copa Libertadores and ahead of the Copa CONMEBOL.

Year	Stage	Match	Opposing team	Score	Venue
1988	First round	1st leg	(Argentina) Racing Club	0–2	Estadio Presidente Juan Domingo Perón, Avellaneda, Argentina
1988	First round	2nd leg	(Argentina) Racing Club	0–0	Estádio Vila Belmiro, Santos, Brazil
1989	First round	1st leg	(Argentina) Independiente	1–2	Estádio Vila Belmiro, Santos, Brazil
1989	First round	2nd leg	(Argentina) Independiente	0–2	Estadio Libertadores de América, Avellaneda, Argentina
1990	First round	1st leg	(Uruguay) Peñarol	0–0	Estadio Centenario, Montevideo, Uruguay
1990	First round	2nd leg	(Uruguay) Peñarol	2–2 (2–4 pks)	Estádio Vila Belmiro, Santos, Brazil
1991	First round	1st leg	(Argentina) Argentinos Juniors	2–1	Estadio Arquitecto Ricardo Etcheverry, Buenos Aires, Argentina
1991	First round	2nd leg	(Argentina) Argentinos Juniors	0–0	Estádio Vila Belmiro, Santos, Brazil
1991	Quarterfinal	1st leg	(Uruguay) Peñarol	2–3	Estadio Centenario, Montevideo, Uruguay
1991	Quarterfinal	2nd leg	(Uruguay) Peñarol	0–0	Estádio Vila Belmiro, Santos, Brazil
1992	First round	1st leg	(Brazil) São Paulo	1–1	Estádio Vila Belmiro, Santos, Brazil
1992	First round	2nd leg	(Brazil) São Paulo	1–4	Morumbi, São Paulo, Brazil
1993	First round	1st leg	(Colombia) Atlético Nacional	0–0	Estádio Vila Belmiro, Santos, Brazil
1993	First round	2nd leg	(Colombia) Atlético Nacional	0–1	Estadio Atanasio Girardot, Medellín, Colombia
1994	First round	1st leg	(Argentina) Independiente	1–0	Estádio Vila Belmiro, Santos, Brazil
1994	First round	2nd leg	(Argentina) Independiente	0–4	Estadio Libertadores de América, Avellaneda, Argentina
1995	First round	1st leg	(Argentina) Independiente	1–1	Estadio Libertadores de América, Avellaneda, Argentina
1995	First round	2nd leg	(Argentina) Independiente	2–2 (2–3 pks)	Estádio Vila Belmiro, Santos, Brazil
1996	First round	1st leg	(Uruguay) Peñarol	2–1	Estadio Atilio Paiva Olivera, Rivera, Uruguay
1996	First round	2nd leg	(Uruguay) Peñarol	3–0	Estádio Ícaro de Castro Melo, São Paulo, Brazil
1996	Quarterfinal	1st leg	(Colombia) Atlético Nacional	2–0	Teixeirão, São José do Rio Preto, Brazil
1996	Quarterfinal	2nd leg	(Colombia) Atlético Nacional	1–3 (7–6 pks)	Estadio Atanasio Girardot, Medellín, Colombia
1996	Semifinal	1st leg	(Argentina) Argentinos Juniors	1–2	Estádio Parque do Sabiá, Uberlândia, Brazil
1996	Semifinal	2nd leg	(Argentina) Argentinos Juniors	1–1	Estadio José Amalfitani, Buenos Aires, Argentina
1997	Group stage	Match 2	(Brazil) Vasco da Gama	1–2	Estádio São Januário, Rio de Janeiro, Brazil
1997	Group stage	Match 4	(Argentina) River Plate	2–3	Estadio Antonio Liberti, Buenos Aires, Argentina
1997	Group stage	Match 6	(Argentina) Racing Club	2–2	Estadio Presidente Juan Domingo Perón, Avellaneda, Argentina
1997	Group stage	Match 8	(Brazil) Vasco da Gama	1–2	Estádio Vila Belmiro, Santos, Brazil
1997	Group stage	Match 10	(Argentina) River Plate	2–1	Estádio Vila Belmiro, Santos, Brazil
1997	Group stage	Match 11	(Argentina) Racing Club	3–2	Estádio Vila Belmiro, Santos, Brazil

=== Recopa Sudamericana de Campeones Intercontinentales ===
The Recopa Sudamericana de Campeones Intercontinentales was a club competition contested annually by the past South American winners of the Intercontinental Cup. The first competition was held in the 1968 season, and the last in 1969.

Year	Match	Opposing team	Score	Venue
1968	Match 2	(Argentina) Racing Club	2–0	Estádio Palestra Itália, São Paulo, Brazil
1968	Match 3	(Uruguay) Peñarol	1–0	Maracanã, Rio de Janeiro, Brazil
1968	Match 4	(Argentina) Racing Club	3–2	Estadio Presidente Juan Domingo Perón, Avellaneda, Argentina
1968	Match 5	(Uruguay) Peñarol	0–3	Estadio Centenario, Montevideo, Uruguay
1969	Match 4	(Argentina) Racing Club	1–2	Estadio Presidente Juan Domingo Perón, Avellaneda, Argentina
1969	Match 5	(Uruguay) Peñarol	1–2	Estadio Centenario, Montevideo, Uruguay
1969	Match 6	(Argentina) Estudiantes	1–3	Estadio Jorge Luis Hirschi, La Plata, Argentina
1969	Match 7	(Argentina) Racing Club	0–2	Estádio Vila Belmiro, Santos, Brazil
1969	Match 8	(Uruguay) Peñarol	2–0	Estádio Palestra Itália, São Paulo, Brazil

=== Copa CONMEBOL / Copa Sudamericana ===
The Copa CONMEBOL was an annual cup competition played between 1992 and 1999 for eligible South American football clubs. During its time of existence, it was the third most prestigious South American club football contest after the Copa Libertadores and Supercopa Sudamericana. Teams that were not able to qualify for the Copa Libertadores played in this tournament. The tournament was played as a knockout cup. The tournament ended in 1999, following the expansion of Copa Libertadores to 32 teams.

The Copa Sudamericana is a competition contested since 2002 after the discontinuation of the Copa Merconorte and Copa Mercosur. Since its introduction, the competition has been a pure elimination tournament with the number of rounds and teams varying from year to year. The Copa Sudamericana is considered a merger of defunct tournaments such as the Copa CONMEBOL, Copa Mercosur and Copa Merconorte.

Year	Competition	Stage	Match	Opposing team	Score	Venue
1998	Copa CONMEBOL	First round	1st leg	(Colombia) Once Caldas	2–1	Estádio Vila Belmiro, Santos, Brazil
1998	Copa CONMEBOL	First round	2nd leg	(Colombia) Once Caldas	1–2 (3–2 pks)	Estadio Palogrande, Manizales, Colombia
1998	Copa CONMEBOL	Quarterfinal	1st leg	(Ecuador) Liga de Quito	2–2	La Casa Blanca, Quito, Ecuador
1998	Copa CONMEBOL	Quarterfinal	2nd leg	(Ecuador) Liga de Quito	3–0	Estádio Vila Belmiro, Santos, Brazil
1998	Copa CONMEBOL	Semifinal	1st leg	(Brazil) Sampaio Corrêa	0–0	Estádio Vila Belmiro, Santos, Brazil
1998	Copa CONMEBOL	Semifinal	2nd leg	(Brazil) Sampaio Corrêa	5–1	Castelão, São Luís, Brazil
1998	Copa CONMEBOL	Final	1st leg	(Argentina) Rosario Central	1–0	Estádio Vila Belmiro, Santos, Brazil
1998	Copa CONMEBOL	Final	2nd leg	(Argentina) Rosario Central	0–0	Estadio Gigante de Arroyito, Rosario, Argentina
2003	Copa Sudamericana	Brazil 1 Preliminary	Match 1	(Brazil) Internacional	1–1	Estádio Vila Belmiro, Santos, Brazil
2003	Copa Sudamericana	Brazil 1 Preliminary	Match 2	(Brazil) Flamengo	3–0	Maracanã, Rio de Janeiro, Brazil
2003	Copa Sudamericana	Final Brazil preliminary	1st leg	(Brazil) São Caetano	1–0	Estádio Anacleto Campanella, São Caetano do Sul, Brazil
2003	Copa Sudamericana	Final Brazil preliminary	2nd leg	(Brazil) São Caetano	1–1	Estádio Vila Belmiro, Santos, Brazil
2003	Copa Sudamericana	Quarterfinal	1st leg	(Peru) Cienciano	1–1	Estádio Vila Belmiro, Santos, Brazil
2003	Copa Sudamericana	Quarterfinal	2nd leg	(Peru) Cienciano	1–2	Estadio Garcilaso, Cusco, Peru
2004	Copa Sudamericana	Brazil preliminary 1	1st leg	(Brazil) Paraná	1–2	Estádio Vila Capanema, Curitiba, Brazil
2004	Copa Sudamericana	Brazil preliminary 1	2nd leg	(Brazil) Paraná	3–0	Estádio Vila Belmiro, Santos, Brazil
2004	Copa Sudamericana	Brazil preliminary 5	1st leg	(Brazil) Flamengo	0–0	Estádio Vila Belmiro, Santos, Brazil
2004	Copa Sudamericana	Brazil preliminary 5	2nd leg	(Brazil) Flamengo	1–1 (5–4 pks)	Maracanã, Rio de Janeiro, Brazil
2004	Copa Sudamericana	Brazil preliminary QF3	1st leg	(Brazil) São Paulo	1–0	Estádio Vila Belmiro, Santos, Brazil
2004	Copa Sudamericana	Brazil preliminary QF3	2nd leg	(Brazil) São Paulo	1–1	Morumbi, São Paulo, Brazil
2004	Copa Sudamericana	Quarterfinal	1st leg	(Ecuador) Liga de Quito	2–3	La Casa Blanca, Quito, Ecuador
2004	Copa Sudamericana	Quarterfinal	2nd leg	(Ecuador) Liga de Quito	1–2	Estádio Vila Belmiro, Santos, Brazil
2005	Copa Sudamericana	First round	1st leg	(Brazil) Fluminense	1–2	Maracanã, Rio de Janeiro, Brazil
2005	Copa Sudamericana	First round	2nd leg	(Brazil) Fluminense	2–1 (2–4 pks)	Estádio Vila Belmiro, Santos, Brazil
2006	Copa Sudamericana	First round	1st leg	(Brazil) Cruzeiro	1–0	Estádio Vila Belmiro, Santos, Brazil
2006	Copa Sudamericana	First round	2nd leg	(Brazil) Cruzeiro	0–1 (4–3 pks)	Mineirão, Belo Horizonte, Brazil
2006	Copa Sudamericana	Round of 16	1st leg	(Argentina) San Lorenzo	0–3	Estadio Pedro Bidegain, Buenos Aires, Argentina
2006	Copa Sudamericana	Round of 16	2nd leg	(Argentina) San Lorenzo	1–0	Estádio Vila Belmiro, Santos, Brazil
2010	Copa Sudamericana	First round	1st leg	(Brazil) Avaí	1–3	Pacaembu, São Paulo, Brazil
2010	Copa Sudamericana	First round	2nd leg	(Brazil) Avaí	1–0	Ressacada, Florianópolis, Brazil
2019	Copa Sudamericana	First round	1st leg	(Uruguay) River Plate	0–0	Luis Franzini, Montevideo, Uruguay
2019	Copa Sudamericana	First round	2nd leg	(Uruguay) River Plate	1–1	Pacaembu, São Paulo, Brazil
2021	Copa Sudamericana	Round of 16	Match C	(Argentina) Independiente	1–0	Estádio Vila Belmiro, Santos, Brazil
2021	Copa Sudamericana	Round of 16	Match C	(Argentina) Independiente	1–1	Estadio Libertadores de América, Avellaneda, Argentina
2021	Copa Sudamericana	Quarterfinals	Match S3	(Paraguay) Libertad	2–1	Estádio Vila Belmiro, Santos, Brazil
2021	Copa Sudamericana	Quarterfinals	Match S3	(Paraguay) Libertad	0–1	Estadio Defensores del Chaco, Asunción, Paraguay
2022	Copa Sudamericana	Group stage	Round 1	(Argentina) Banfield	0–1	Estadio Florencio Sola, Banfield, Argentina
2022	Copa Sudamericana	Group stage	Round 2	(Ecuador) Universidad Católica	3–2	Estádio Vila Belmiro, Santos, Brazil
2022	Copa Sudamericana	Group stage	Round 3	(Chile) Unión La Calera	1–1	Estadio Sausalito, Viña del Mar, Chile
2022	Copa Sudamericana	Group stage	Round 4	(Ecuador) Universidad Católica	1–0	Estadio Olímpico Atahualpa, Quito, Ecuador
2022	Copa Sudamericana	Group stage	Round 5	(Chile) Unión La Calera	1–0	Estádio Vila Belmiro, Santos, Brazil
2022	Copa Sudamericana	Group stage	Round 6	(Argentina) Banfield	1–1	Estádio Vila Belmiro, Santos, Brazil
2022	Copa Sudamericana	Round of 16	Match A	(Venezuela) Deportivo Táchira	1–1	Estadio Polideportivo de Pueblo Nuevo, San Cristóbal, Venezuela
2022	Copa Sudamericana	Round of 16	Match A	(Venezuela) Deportivo Táchira	1–1 (2–4 pks)	Estádio Vila Belmiro, Santos, Brazil
2023	Copa Sudamericana	Group stage	Round 1	(Bolivia) Blooming	1–0	Estadio Ramón Tahuichi Aguilera, Santa Cruz de la Sierra, Bolivia
2023	Copa Sudamericana	Group stage	Round 2	(Chile) Audax Italiano	0–0	Estádio Vila Belmiro, Santos, Brazil
2023	Copa Sudamericana	Group stage	Round 3	(Argentina) Newell's Old Boys	0–1	Estadio Marcelo Bielsa, Rosario, Argentina
2023	Copa Sudamericana	Group stage	Round 4	(Chile) Audax Italiano	1–2	Estadio El Teniente, Rancagua, Chile
2023	Copa Sudamericana	Group stage	Round 5	(Argentina) Newell's Old Boys	1–2	Estádio Vila Belmiro, Santos, Brazil
2023	Copa Sudamericana	Group stage	Round 6	(Bolivia) Blooming	0–0	Estádio Vila Belmiro, Santos, Brazil

=== Recopa Sudamericana ===
The Recopa Sudamericana was inaugurated in 1988 as a way of determining an ultimate South American winner, by pitting the holders of the Copa Libertadores against the winners of the Supercopa Sudamericana. After the latter's abolishment, the Copa Sudamericana winner participated against the Copa Libertadores champions.

Year	Opposing team	Match	Score	Venue
2012	Universidad de Chile	1st leg	0–0	Estadio Nacional de Chile, Santiago, Chile
2012	Universidad de Chile	2nd leg	2–0	Pacaembu, São Paulo, Brazil

=== Intercontinental Cup / FIFA Club World Cup ===
In 1960, CONMEBOL and their European equivalent, the Union of European Football Associations (UEFA), created the Intercontinental Cup as a way of determining the best team in the world, by pitting the winners of the Copa Libertadores and the European Champions' Cup, now known as the UEFA Champions League, against each other. In 2000, FIFA launched their international club competition called the FIFA Club World Cup, featuring teams from all of its member associations. In the second edition of the Club World Cup, in 2005, FIFA took over the Intercontinental Cup, subsuming it into its own competition.

Year	Competition	Stage	Match	Opposing team	Score	Venue
1962	Intercontinental Cup	Final	1st leg	(Portugal) Benfica	3–2	Maracanã, Rio de Janeiro, Brazil
1962	Intercontinental Cup	Final	2nd leg	(Portugal) Benfica	5–2	Estádio da Luz, Lisbon, Portugal
1963	Intercontinental Cup	Final	1st leg	(Italy) Milan	2–4	San Siro, Milan, Italy
1963	Intercontinental Cup	Final	2nd leg	(Italy) Milan	4–2	Maracanã, Rio de Janeiro, Brazil
1963	Intercontinental Cup	Final	Playoff	(Italy) Milan	1–0	Maracanã, Rio de Janeiro, Brazil
2011	FIFA Club World Cup	Semifinal		(Japan) Kashiwa Reysol	3–1	Toyota Stadium, Toyota, Japan
2011	FIFA Club World Cup	Final		(Spain) Barcelona	0–4	International Stadium Yokohama, Yokohama, Japan

=== Intercontinental Supercup ===
The Intercontinental Supercup was a competition endorsed by UEFA and CONMEBOL, contested between the winners of the European Intercontinental winner's group and the South American Recopa Sudamericana de Campeones Intercontinentales.

Year	Match	Opposing team	Score	Venue
1968	1st leg	(Italy) Internazionale	1–0	San Siro, Milan, Italy
1968	2nd leg	(Italy) Internazionale	Not disputed	

=== Overall record ===
As of 8 December 2023

Competition	Played	Won	Drew	Lost	GF	GA	GD	Win%	App
Copa Libertadores	145	80	30	35	281	166	+115	55.17	16
Supercopa Libertadores	32	7	12	13	34	44	−10	21.88	10
Recopa Sudamericana de Campeones Intercontinentales	9	4	0	5	11	14	−3	44.44	2
Copa Sudamericana	42	14	15	13	42	41	+1	33.33	9
Copa CONMEBOL	8	4	3	1	14	6	+8	50.00	1
Recopa Sudamericana	2	1	1	0	2	0	+2	50.00	1
Intercontinental Cup	5	4	0	1	15	10	+5	80.00	2
FIFA Club World Cup	2	1	0	1	3	5	−2	50.00	1
Intercontinental Supercup	1	1	0	0	1	0	+1	100.00	1
Total	246	116	61	69	403	286	+117	47.15	—

== Competitive record ==
=== Against national clubs ===
Below is a list of all matches Santos have played against other clubs around Brazil:

Opponent	Played	Won	Drawn	Lost	Goals for	Goals against	% Won
(Rio Grande do Norte) América do Natal	6	4	1	1	18	8	72%
(São Paulo (state)) América-SP	72	41	15	16	134	67	63%
(São Paulo (state)) América do Santos	2	2	0	0	12	3	100%
(São Paulo (state)) Americana	1	0	1	0	0	0	33%
(Goiás) Atlético Goianiense	4	4	0	0	9	4	100%
(Minas Gerais) Atlético Mineiro	82	30	22	30	121	124	45%
(Paraná (state)) Atlético Paranaense	42	18	12	12	64	50	52%
(São Paulo (state)) Atlético Santista	4	4	0	0	22	3	100%
(Santa Catarina (state)) Avaí	8	4	3	1	13	10	62%
Bahia	49	24	9	16	109	72	55%
(Rio de Janeiro (state)) Botafogo	95	34	27	34	163	144	45%
(São Paulo (state)) Botafogo-SP	87	52	20	15	194	92	67%
(São Paulo (state)) Bragantino	33	17	9	7	60	37	60%
(São Paulo (state)) Brasil	2	2	0	0	5	1	100%
(Federal District (Brazil)) Brasiliense	4	1	2	1	4	4	41%
Ceará	9	3	3	3	13	11	44%
(São Paulo (state)) Chantecler	2	2	0	0	9	1	100%
(São Paulo (state)) Corinthians	298	94	82	122	467	554	40%
(Paraná (state)) Coritiba	37	22	6	9	70	45	64%
(Santa Catarina (state)) Criciúma	10	7	2	1	21	10	76%
(Minas Gerais) Cruzeiro	60	22	17	21	105	95	46%
(Alagoas) CSA	4	2	1	1	3	1	58%
(São Paulo (state)) Escola Estadual Rosa	2	2	0	0	10	1	100%
(São Paulo (state)) Ferroviária	70	38	14	18	130	72	60%
(Santa Catarina (state)) Figueirense	17	10	0	7	34	23	58%
(Rio de Janeiro (state)) Flamengo	106	41	28	37	163	145	47%
(Rio de Janeiro (state)) Fluminense	81	31	18	32	132	138	45%
(Ceará) Fortaleza	15	8	7	0	32	9	68%
Goiás	45	14	15	16	74	68	42%
(Rio Grande do Sul) Grêmio	67	31	15	21	99	72	53%
(São Paulo (state)) Grêmio Barueri	7	3	3	1	13	7	57%
(São Paulo (state)) Guarani	176	94	38	44	364	224	60%
(São Paulo (state)) Guaratinguetá	3	3	0	0	4	0	100%
(Rio Grande do Sul) Internacional	57	23	14	20	74	72	48%
(Minas Gerais) Ipatinga	4	1	3	0	7	3	50%
(São Paulo (state)) Ituano	21	13	6	2	51	22	71%
(São Paulo (state)) Juventude	19	9	7	3	32	21	59%
(São Paulo (state)) Juventus	131	87	27	17	328	139	73%
(São Paulo (state)) Marília	32	19	8	5	54	30	67%
(São Paulo (state)) Mirassol	4	3	1	0	8	3	83%
(São Paulo (state)) Mogi Mirim	33	17	10	6	55	28	61%
(São Paulo (state)) Monte Azul	1	1	0	0	5	0	100%
(Pernambuco) Náutico	26	12	6	8	39	29	53%
(Mato Grosso do Sul) Naviraiense	2	2	0	0	11	0	100%
(São Paulo (state)) Noroeste	60	40	11	9	143	63	72%
(São Paulo (state)) Oeste	4	4	0	0	7	1	100%
(São Paulo (state)) Palmeiras	294	90	78	126	433	522	39%
(Paraná (state)) Paraná	22	11	5	6	31	22	57%
(Pará) Paysandu	17	13	2	2	45	14	80%
(São Paulo (state)) Ponte Preta	114	64	23	27	221	129	62%
(São Paulo (state)) Paulista	28	14	10	4	40	29	61%
(São Paulo (state)) Portuguesa	231	109	58	64	454	329	55%
(São Paulo (state)) Portuguesa Santista	107	69	23	15	249	114	71%
(Acre (state)) Rio Branco	2	2	0	0	6	1	100%
(São Paulo (state)) Rio Branco	19	12	2	5	46	24	66%
(São Paulo (state)) Rio Claro	5	2	3	0	8	5	60%
(São Paulo (state)) Rio Preto	2	1	0	1	8	5	50%
(Maranhão) Sampaio Corrêa	2	1	1	0	5	1	66%
(Pernambuco) Santa Cruz	23	10	8	5	42	22	55%
(São Paulo (state)) Santo André	35	15	11	9	49	33	53%
(São Paulo (state)) Santos AC	1	1	0	0	3	2	100%
(São Paulo (state)) São Bernardo	1	0	1	0	1	1	33%
(São Paulo (state)) São Caetano	27	15	5	7	45	32	62%
(São Paulo (state)) São Paulo	266	91	62	113	379	434	41%
(São Paulo (state)) São Paulo Railway	2	2	0	0	13	1	100%
Sergipe	6	5	1	0	18	1	88%
(São Paulo (state)) Sertãozinho	3	2	0	1	8	4	77%
(Pernambuco) Sport Recife	32	17	10	5	54	31	63%
(São Paulo (state)) Thereza Team	1	1	0	0	2	1	100%
(São Paulo (state)) União Barbarense	4	2	1	1	8	5	58%
(São Paulo (state)) União São João	18	9	9	0	37	16	66%
(Minas Gerais) URT	1	1	0	0	3	1	100%
(Rio de Janeiro (state)) Vasco da Gama	106	36	32	38	175	171	44%
(Bahia) Vitória	32	15	8	9	53	39	55%
Total	3279	1489	816	974	5835	4482	53%

=== Against AFC clubs ===
Below is a list of all matches Santos have played against clubs from the Asian Football Confederation (AFC):

Opponent	Played	Won	Drawn	Lost	Goals for	Goals against	% Won
(Saudi Arabia) Al Nassr	1	1	0	0	4	1	100%
(Saudi Arabia) Al-Riyadh	1	1	0	0	3	0	100%
(Hong Kong) Caroline Hill	1	1	0	0	4	0	100%
(Qatar) National	1	1	0	0	3	0	100%
(Saudi Arabia) National	1	1	0	0	5	0	100%
(Japan) Shimizu S-Pulse	2	1	1	0	4	1	66%
(Hong Kong) South China	1	1	0	0	4	2	100%
(Hong Kong) Syu Fong	1	1	0	0	3	1	100%
(Japan) Tosu Futures	1	0	1	0	2	2	33%
Total	10	8	2	0	32	7	87%

=== Against CAF clubs ===
Below is a list of all matches Santos have played against clubs from the Confédération Africaine de Football (CAF):

Opponent	Played	Won	Drawn	Lost	Goals for	Goals against	% Won
(Ivory Coast) Stade d'Abidjan	1	1	0	0	7	1	100%
Total	1	1	0	0	7	1	100%

=== Against CONCACAF clubs ===
Below is a list of all matches Santos have played against clubs from the Confederation of North, Central American and Caribbean Association Football (CONCACAF):

Opponent	Played	Won	Drawn	Lost	Goals for	Goals against	% Won
(El Salvador) Alianza	1	0	0	1	1	2	0%
(United States) Atlanta Chiefs	1	1	0	0	6	2	100%
(Mexico) Atlante	1	0	1	0	2	2	33%
(Mexico) Atlas	3	2	0	1	6	3	66%
(United States) Baltimore	1	1	0	0	6	4	100%
(United States) Baltimore Bays	2	2	0	0	11	1	100%
(United States) Boston Astros	1	1	0	0	6	1	100%
(United States) Boston Beacons	1	1	0	0	7	1	100%
(Mexico) Chivas	12	8	1	3	25	15	69%
(United States) Chivas USA	4	4	0	0	8	3	100%
(Mexico) Club América	14	7	4	3	30	16	59%
(Guatemala) Comunicaciones	2	1	1	0	3	2	66%
(Costa Rica) Herediano	1	1	0	0	3	0	100%
(United States) Kansas City Spurs	1	1	0	0	4	1	100%
(Mexico) León	1	1	0	0	2	0	100%
(United States) Miami Toros	1	1	0	0	6	1	100%
(Mexico) Monterrey	1	0	1	0	2	2	33%
(Mexico) Necaxa	3	1	0	2	8	10	33%
(United States) New York Cosmos	3	0	1	2	3	5	11%
(United States) New York Red Bulls	1	0	0	1	1	3	0%
(United States) Oakland Clippers	1	1	0	0	3	1	100%
(United States) Rochester Lancers	1	1	0	0	2	1	100%
(Mexico) Santos Laguna	1	0	0	1	1	2	0%
(Costa Rica) Saprissa	3	3	0	0	15	7	100%
(United States) St. Louis Stars	1	1	0	0	3	2	100%
(Suriname) SV Transvaal	1	1	0	0	4	0	100%
(Mexico) Toluca	1	0	1	0	2	2	33%
(Canada) Toronto Metros	1	1	0	0	4	2	100%
(Mexico) UNAM Pumas	2	2	0	0	7	1	100%
(United States) Washington Darts	1	1	0	0	7	4	100%
Total	67	43	10	14	184	105	69%

=== Against CONMEBOL clubs ===
Below is a list of all matches Santos have played against clubs from the Confederación Sudamericana de Fútbol (CONMEBOL):

Opponent	Played	Won	Drawn	Lost	Goals for	Goals against	% Won
(Paraguay) 12 de Octubre	2	2	0	0	7	2	100%
(Peru) Alianza Lima	7	7	0	0	24	9	100%
(Colombia) América de Cali	6	4	0	2	10	3	66%
(Argentina) Argentinos Juniors	2	1	1	0	2	1	66%
(Colombia) Atlético Nacional	6	2	2	2	8	7	44%
(Argentina) Atlético Tucumán	3	3	0	0	12	4	100%
(Ecuador) Barcelona SC	3	3	0	0	10	3	100%
(Uruguay) Bella Vista	1	1	0	0	2	1	100%
(Bolivia) Blooming	2	2	0	0	6	0	100%
(Argentina) Boca Juniors	12	6	2	4	24	20	55%
(Bolivia) Bolívar	3	2	0	1	13	5	77%
(Venezuela) Caracas	2	1	1	0	5	4	66%
(Uruguay) Cerro	1	1	0	0	4	2	100%
(Paraguay) Cerro Porteño	6	3	3	0	17	7	66%
(Peru) Cienciano	3	1	1	1	11	3	44%
(Chile) Colo-Colo	16	10	1	5	42	35	64%
(Argentina) Colón	1	0	0	1	1	2	0%
(Colombia) Cúcuta Deportivo	4	3	1	0	6	1	83%
(Uruguay) Danubio	2	2	0	0	5	3	100%
(Uruguay) Defensor Sporting	2	2	0	0	3	0	100%
(Colombia) Deportivo Cali	3	1	1	1	7	4	44%
(Bolivia) Deportivo Municipal	2	2	0	0	13	4	100%
(Peru) Deportivo Municipal	6	6	0	0	28	10	100%
(Colombia) Deportivo Pasto	2	2	0	0	4	0	100%
(Venezuela) Deportivo Táchira	2	1	1	0	3	1	66%
(Uruguay) Dublin FC	2	0	0	2	3	9	0%
(Ecuador) El Nacional	2	0	2	0	1	1	33%
(Argentina) Estudiantes	3	2	0	1	6	6	66%
(Venezuela) Galicia	2	2	0	0	8	2	100%
(Argentina) Gimnasia	5	2	3	0	10	6	60%
(Paraguay) Guaraní	2	1	1	0	4	3	66%
(Argentina) Huracán	4	3	0	1	12	6	75%
(Argentina) Independiente	13	4	3	6	19	23	38%
(Colombia) Independiente Medellín	3	3	0	0	6	3	100%
(Colombia) Independiente Santa Fé	1	1	0	0	2	1	100%
(Bolivia) Jorge Wilstermann	2	2	0	0	8	2	100%
(Colombia) Junior	4	1	1	2	8	8	33%
(Paraguay) Libertad	3	2	0	1	7	5	66%
(Ecuador) Liga de Quito	9	4	1	4	22	17	48%
(Colombia) Millonarios	4	2	0	2	6	6	50%
(Uruguay) Nacional	11	3	6	2	21	17	45%
(Uruguay) Nacional Wanderes	1	0	0	1	1	2	0%
(Argentina) Newell's Old Boys	1	0	1	0	1	1	33%
(Paraguay) Olimpia	2	0	2	0	2	2	33%
(Colombia) Once Caldas	6	2	2	2	6	6	44%
(Bolivia) Oriente Petrolero	1	1	0	0	4	3	100%
(Uruguay) Peñarol	22	10	5	7	36	31	53%
(Argentina) Racing Club	14	7	4	3	31	23	59%
(Uruguay) Rampla Juniors	1	1	0	0	5	0	100%
(Argentina) River Plate	15	9	0	6	31	24	60%
(Uruguay) River Plate	2	0	2	0	1	1	0%
(Argentina) Rosario Central	3	2	1	0	2	0	77%
(Bolivia) San José	2	1	0	1	8	2	50%
(Argentina) San Lorenzo	4	2	1	1	5	6	58%
(Argentina) San Martín de Mendoza	3	2	0	1	7	5	66%
(Peru) Sporting Cristal	3	2	1	0	12	4	77%
(Bolivia) The Strongest	1	1	0	0	2	0	100%
(Uruguay) Sud América	1	1	0	0	5	0	100%
(Argentina) Talleres de Córdoba	4	3	0	1	10	3	83%
Universidad de Chile	11	7	1	3	28	11	66%
(Chile) Universidad Católica	6	5	1	0	17	7	88%
(Peru) Universitario	10	5	2	3	25	16	56%
(Argentina) Vélez Sársfield	3	0	2	1	3	4	22%
(Venezuela) Vitória	1	0	0	1	1	3	0%
Total	285	160	56	69	623	399	63%

=== Against UEFA clubs ===
Below is a list of all matches Santos have played against clubs from the Union of European Football Associations (UEFA):

Opponent	Played	Won	Drawn	Lost	Goals for	Goals against	% Won
(West Germany) 1. FC Nürnberg	1	0	1	0	6	6	33%
(West Germany) 1860 Munich	2	2	0	0	14	5	100%
(Italy) A.C. Milan	9	4	2	3	11	13	55%
(Greece) AEK Athens	2	2	0	0	4	0	100%
(Netherlands) Ajax	1	1	0	0	4	1	100%
(Sweden) AIK Fotboll	1	1	0	0	1	0	100%
(Italy) Alessandria	1	1	0	0	2	0	100%
(Belgium) Anderlecht	4	3	1	0	12	4	83%
(West Germany) Arminia Bielefeld	1	1	0	0	5	0	100%
(England) Aston Villa	1	0	0	1	1	2	0%
(Spain) Atlético Madrid	4	1	2	1	4	3	41%
(Belgium) Beerschot VAC	1	0	0	1	1	4	0%
(Portugal) Belenenses	1	1	0	0	6	1	100%
(Portugal) Benfica	7	6	1	0	28	14	90%
(Republic of Ireland) Bohemian	1	1	0	0	3	2	100%
(Italy) Bologna	3	2	1	0	4	2	77%
(France) Bordeaux	1	0	1	0	2	2	33%
(Italy) Cagliari	2	2	0	0	5	3	100%
(Italy) Catanzaro	1	1	0	0	7	1	100%
(Spain) CD Málaga	1	0	0	1	1	4	0%
(England) Chelsea	2	2	0	0	5	1	100%
(England) Coventry City	1	0	1	0	2	2	33%
(Mexico) Cruz Azul	3	1	2	0	4	3	55%
(Croatia) Dinamo Zagreb	2	0	2	0	2	2	33%
(Czech Republic) Dukla Prague	1	0	0	1	3	4	0%
(Spain) Elche	1	0	1	1	1	4	0%
(West Germany) Eintracht Frankfurt	2	2	0	0	9	4	100%
(Spain) Espanyol	2	0	1	1	3	6	16%
(Switzerland) FC Basel	1	1	0	0	8	2	100%
(Spain) FC Barcelona	5	1	1	3	11	13	26%
(West Germany) FC Schalke 04	1	1	0	0	2	1	100%
(Switzerland) FC Zürich	1	0	0	1	4	5	0%
FK Austria Wien	1	0	0	1	0	3	0%
(Serbia) FK Slavija Kragujevac	1	0	1	0	4	4	33%
(Bosnia and Herzegovina) FK Željezničar	1	0	1	0	1	1	33%
(Turkey) Fenerbahçe	1	0	0	1	1	6	0%
(Netherlands) Feyenoord	3	2	0	1	6	3	66%
(West Germany) Fortuna Düsseldorf	1	1	0	0	6	4	100%
(Italy) Fiorentina	2	0	1	1	1	4	16%
(England) Fulham	1	0	0	1	1	2	0%
(Turkey) Galatasaray	1	0	0	1	2	3	0%
(Italy) Genoa	1	1	0	0	4	2	100%
(West Germany) Hannover 96	1	1	0	0	3	1	100%
(Scotland) Hearts	1	0	1	0	2	2	33%
(Italy) Internazionale	11	5	0	6	24	18	45%
(Italy) Juventus	2	1	0	1	5	5	50%
(Belgium) KAA Gent	2	1	0	1	6	4	50%
(West Germany) Karlsruher SC	1	1	0	0	8	6	100%
(Italy) Lazio	3	2	0	1	10	7	66%
(Spain) Málaga	1	1	0	0	2	1	100%
(Italy) Mantova	1	1	0	0	6	1	100%
(Italy) Napoli	5	5	0	0	19	8	100%
(England) Newcastle United	1	1	0	0	4	2	100%
(Greece) Olympiacos	1	0	0	1	1	2	0%
(France) Olympique Lyonnais	1	1	0	0	6	2	100%
(Greece) Panathinaikos	1	1	0	0	3	2	100%
(Greece) PAOK	1	1	0	0	3	1	100%
(Italy) Parma	2	1	0	1	4	3	50%
(England) Plymouth Argyle	1	0	0	1	2	3	0%
(France) Racing Levallois 92	5	4	0	1	22	11	86%
(Spain) Real Betis	1	0	1	0	2	2	33%
(Spain) Real Madrid	3	1	1	1	6	6	44%
(Spain) Real Zaragoza	1	1	0	0	3	2	100%
(Serbia) Red Star Belgrade	1	0	1	0	3	3	33%
(Italy) Roma	6	6	0	0	20	8	100%
(Switzerland) Servette	1	1	0	0	4	1	100%
(England) Sheffield Wednesday	2	2	0	0	6	2	100%
(Portugal) Sporting	2	1	1	0	8	5	66%
(France) Stade de Reims	3	2	1	0	9	5	77%
(Belgium) Standard Liège	3	3	0	0	6	3	100%
(England) Stoke City	1	1	0	0	3	2	100%
(France) Toulouse	1	2	0	0	3	0	100%
(Italy) US Lecce	1	1	0	0	5	1	100%
(Spain) Valencia	3	1	1	1	5	6	44%
(Hungary) Vasas	2	1	1	0	6	2	66%
(Italy) Venezia	1	1	0	0	1	0	100%
(West Germany) VfB Stuttgart	1	1	0	0	3	1	100%
(West Germany) VfL Wolfsburg	1	1	0	0	6	3	100%
(England) West Ham United	2	1	1	0	4	3	66%
Total	159	94	30	35	514	280	65%

=== Against FIFA and non-FIFA teams ===
Below is a list of all matches Santos have played against teams affiliated with the Fédération Internationale de Football Association (FIFA) and non-FIFA teams around the world:

Opponent	Played	Won	Drawn	Lost	Goals for	Goals against	% Won
Alagoas	1	1	0	0	5	0	100%
Algeria	1	0	1	0	1	1	33%
(Antwerp Province) Antwerp	2	1	1	0	7	5	66%
Argentina	1	0	0	1	2	3	0%
Australia	1	0	1	0	2	2	33%
Austria	1	0	0	1	0	1	0%
Bahrain	1	1	0	0	7	1	100%
Bangkok & Hong Kong mixed team	1	1	0	0	6	1	100%
Bavaria	1	0	0	1	0	3	0%
Bermuda	1	1	0	0	1	0	100%
Bolivia	1	1	0	0	3	1	100%
Brazil	1	1	0	0	3	1	100%
Brazil U-23	1	1	0	1	4	4	50%
Bulgaria	2	1	1	0	5	3	66%
Cameroon	2	1	1	0	5	3	66%
Chile	1	1	0	0	5	0	100%
China	1	0	1	0	1	3	133%
China U-23	2	2	0	0	2	0	100%
Cochabamba	1	1	0	0	3	2	100%
Colombia	2	2	0	0	6	3	100%
Congo	6	4	1	1	13	9	66%
Costa Rica	1	1	0	0	2	1	100%
Ivory Coast	1	1	0	0	2	1	100%
Czechoslovakia	2	2	0	0	10	5	100%
East Germany	1	1	0	0	3	1	100%
Enschede	1	1	0	0	5	0	100%
France	1	1	0	0	6	1	100%
Gabon	1	1	0	0	4	0	100%
Genoa	1	1	0	0	7	1	100%
Guadeloupe	1	1	0	0	2	1	100%
Guatemala	1	1	0	0	4	1	100%
Haiti	1	1	0	0	2	0	100%
Hamburg	1	1	0	0	6	0	100%
Hong Kong	4	4	0	0	17	3	100%
Indonesia	1	0	1	0	2	0	100%
Iran	1	1	0	0	2	0	100%
Israel	1	0	0	1	1	2	0%
Jamaica	3	0	2	1	4	5	22%
Japan	2	2	0	0	7	1	100%
Jaú	2	2	0	0	13	4	100%
João Monlevade	1	0	1	0	1	1	33%
Kuwait	1	0	1	0	1	1	33%
Malaysia U-23	1	1	0	0	8	1	100%
Martinique	1	1	0	0	4	1	100%
(Lower Saxony) Niedersachsen	2	2	0	0	10	3	100%
Marseille	1	0	1	0	0	0	33%
Mexico	1	0	1	0	0	0	33%
(United States) NASL All-stars	1	1	0	0	5	1	100%
Netherlands Antilles	1	1	0	0	2	0	100%
Nigeria	1	0	1	0	2	2	33%
Paraguay	1	1	0	0	2	1	100%
Pernambuco	1	1	0	0	2	0	100%
Peru	1	0	1	0	0	0	33%
Poland	1	1	0	0	5	2	100%
(Rio de Janeiro (state)) Rio de Janeiro	1	0	1	0	1	1	33%
Rio Grande do Sul	1	1	0	0	4	1	100%
Romania	1	0	0	1	0	1	0%
Saarland	1	1	0	0	3	0	100%
San Marino	1	1	0	0	2	0	100%
(São Paulo (state)) São Paulo	1	1	0	0	3	0	100%
Saudi Arabia	1	1	0	0	3	0	100%
Senegal	1	1	0	0	4	1	100%
Sergipe	1	1	0	0	3	2	100%
South Africa	1	1	0	0	2	1	100%
South Korea	1	1	0	0	3	2	100%
(Iran) Taj Sports Organization	1	1	0	0	5	0	100%
Thailand	1	1	0	0	6	1	100%
Trinidad and Tobago	1	1	0	0	1	0	100%
United Kingdom	1	1	0	0	4	0	100%
United States	1	0	1	0	3	3	33%
Uruguay	4	1	2	1	7	7	41%
Soviet Union	1	1	0	0	2	1	100%
Vancouver	1	1	0	0	5	0	100%
Venezuela	1	1	0	0	1	0	100%
West Berlin	1	1	0	0	4	2	100%
Total	99	70	20	9	292	109	77%
