= 1969 Intercontinental Supercup =

1969 Intercontinental Champions' Supercup
Tournament details
- Dates: 13 November – 30 December
- Teams: 4 (from 3 associations)
- Venue: 6 (in 5 host cities)

Final positions
- Champions: (Uruguay) Peñarol (1st title)

Tournament statistics
- Matches played: 11
- Goals scored: 27 (2.45 per match)

The 1969 Intercontinental Supercup was the second and last edition of the Intercontinental Supercup, a matchup between the European and South American past winners of the Intercontinental Cup. Both European teams withdrew, so the winner of the South American zone qualifiers was declared winners. Peñarol were declared winners after winning the final stage.

== Participating clubs ==
Club	Qualification Method
(Uruguay) Peñarol	Winner of the 1961, 1966 Intercontinental Cup
(Brazil) Santos	Winner of the 1962, 1963 Intercontinental Cup
(Argentina) Racing	Winner of the 1967 Intercontinental Cup
(Argentina) Estudiantes LP	Winner of the 1968 Intercontinental Cup

== Final stage ==
This South American zone tournament was contested between November 13, 1969, and December 30, 1969, between Peñarol, Santos, Estudiantes LP and Racing, the four South American winners of the Intercontinental Cup to date. Peñarol won the group and the competition.

=== Standings ===
Team	Pld	W	D	L	GF	GA	GD	Pts
(Uruguay) Peñarol	6	4	1	1	11	6	+5	9
(Argentina) Racing	6	3	2	1	6	5	+1	8
(Argentina) Estudiantes LP	5	1	1	3	5	7	−2	3
(Brazil) Santos	5	1	0	4	5	9	−4	2

=== Matches ===
13 November 1969	Racing (Argentina)	0–0	(Uruguay) Peñarol	Avellaneda
		Report		Stadium: Estadio Presidente Perón (El Cilindro); Referee: Jorge Cruzat (Chile)

20 November 1969	Estudiantes LP (Argentina)	1–0	(Argentina) Racing	La Plata
	Cárdenas 50' (pen.)	Report		Stadium: Estadio Jorge Luis Hirschi; Referee: Luis Pestarino (Argentina)

26 November 1969	Peñarol (Uruguay)	3–1	(Argentina) Estudiantes LP	Montevideo
	Rocha 33', 43'; Losada 77'	Report	Verón 89'	Stadium: Estádio Centenario; Referee: César Orosco (Peru)

29 November 1969	Racing (Argentina)	2–1	(Brazil) Santos	Mar del Plata
	Da Silva 1', 56'	Report	Edu 53'	Stadium: Estadio General San Martín; Referee: Pablo Varga (Uruguay)

2 December 1969	Peñarol (Uruguay)	2–1	(Brazil) Santos	Montevideo
	Spencer 35'; Onega 73'	Report	Pelé 18'	Stadium: Estadio Centenario; Referee: Rafael Hormázabal (Chile)

4 December 1969	Estudiantes LP (Argentina)	3–1	(Brazil) Santos	La Plata
	Verón 11', 89'; Conigliario 27'	Report	Manoel Maria 25'	Stadium: Estadio Jorge Luis Hirschi; Referee: Roberto Barreiro (Argentina)

9 December 1969	Santos (Brazil)	0–2	(Argentina) Racing	Santos
		Report	Cardenas 56'; Adorno 85'	Stadium: Estádio Urbano Caldeira; Referee: Arthur Coelho Filho (Brazil)

11 December 1969	Santos (Brazil)	2–0	(Uruguay) Peñarol	São Paulo
	Pelé 65'; Manoel Maria 88'	Report		Stadium: Estádio Parque Antártica; Referee: Ángel Pazos (Uruguay)

20 December 1969	Racing (Argentina)	0–0	(Argentina) Estudiantes LP	Avellaneda
		Report		Stadium: Estadio Presidente Perón (El Cilindro); Referee: Luis Pestarino (Argentina)

23 December 1969	Peñarol (Uruguay)	4–1	(Argentina) Racing	Montevideo
	Spencer 14', 44'; Rocha 55', 72'	Report	Perfumo 89'	Stadium: Estadio Centenario; Referee: Jaime Amor (Chile)

30 December 1969	Estudiantes LP (Argentina)	1–2	(Uruguay) Peñarol	La Plata
	Verde 39'	Report	Rocha 68', 74'	Stadium: Estadio Jorge Luis Hirschi; Referee: Alberto Tejada Burga (Peru)

== Top goalscorer ==
Pedro Rocha with six goals scored.

== See also ==
- Intercontinental Cup
