= Vastola =

Vastola is an Italian surname. Notable people with the surname include:

- Gaetano Vastola (born 1978), Italian footballer
- Gaetano Vastola (gangster) (born 1928), American mobster
- Giovanni Vastola (1938–2017), Italian footballer
