= Negreiros (footballer) =

Brazilian footballer (born 1946)

Personal information
- Full name: Walter Ferraz de Negreiros
- Date of birth: 6 August 1946 (age 80)
- Place of birth: Santos, Brazil
- Position: Midfielder

Youth career
- 1965–1967: Santos

Senior career*
Years	Team	Apps	(Gls)
1967–1972	Santos	124	(12)
1970	→ Grêmio (loan)		
1972–1974	Coritiba		

Managerial career
- 2001: Roma Barueri (youth)
- 2008: Roma Apucarana
- * Club domestic league appearances and goals

Walter Ferraz de Negreiros (born 6 August 1946), simply known as Negreiros, is a Brazilian retired footballer who played as a midfielder.

== Honours ==
=== Player ===
Santos

- Intercontinental Supercup: 1968
- Recopa Sudamericana: 1968
- Campeonato Paulista: 1967, 1968, 1969

Coritiba

- Campeonato Paranaense: 1972, 1973, 1974
