= Clodoaldo =

Brazilian footballer (born 1949)

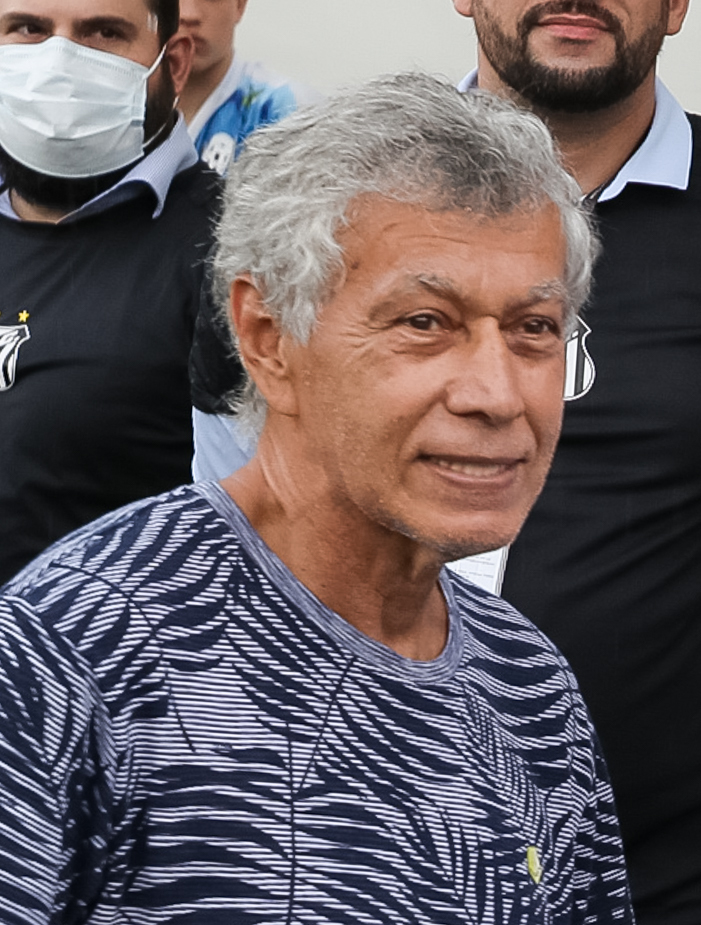
- Clodoaldo in 2020

Personal information
- Full name: Clodoaldo Tavares de Santana
- Date of birth: 25 September 1949 (age 77)
- Place of birth: Aracaju, Brazil
- Height: 1.74 m (5 ft 9 in)
- Position: Midfielder

Senior career*
Years	Team	Apps	(Gls)
1966–1979	Santos	510	(13)
1980	Tampa Bay Rowdies	43	(4)
1981	Nacional	56	(17)

International career
1969–1974	Brazil	38	(1)

Managerial career
- 1982: Santos
- 2010: East Timor
Medal record
Men's Football
Representing Brazil
FIFA World Cup
Winner	1970 Mexico
- * Club domestic league appearances and goals

Clodoaldo Tavares de Santana, better known as Clodoaldo (Brazilian Portuguese: [klodoˈawdu]; born 25 September 1949), is a Brazilian former footballer who played as a defensive midfielder.

== Club career ==
Clodoaldo spent most of his career at Santos, with whom he had won five Campeonato Paulista, as well as a Campeonato Brasileiro Série A and the 1968 Intercontinental Supercup.

He suffered a career-threatening knee injury when he was 29 years old, and as a result, he left Santos in 1979 to join NASL team Tampa Bay Rowdies. He returned to Brazil after a single season in the United States, joining Nacional-AM.

== International career ==
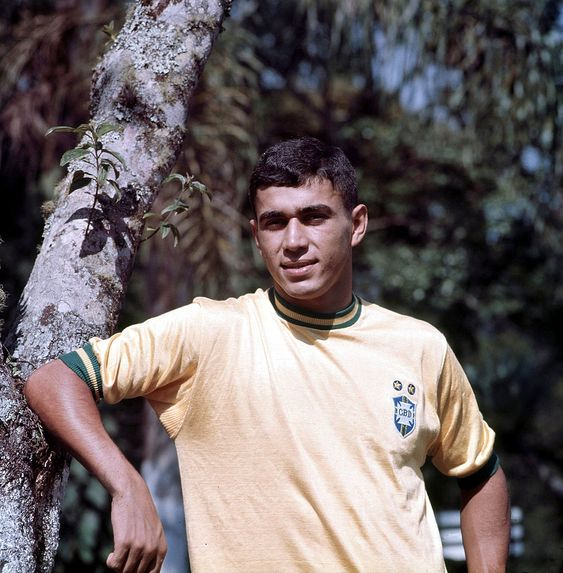
Clodoaldo in 1970

Clodoaldo was capped 38 times with Brazil between 1969 and 1974. He was part of the Brazil squad that won the 1970 FIFA World Cup, and scored the equalising goal in the semi-final against Uruguay. He then memorably contributed to the famous goal by Carlos Alberto Torres against Italy in the final by dribbling past four of the opposition's players in his own half.

== Managerial career ==
Clodoaldo briefly coached Santos after he retired in 1982. In 2010, he became the manager of the East Timor national team, but left the position after three matches due family reasons.

== Honours ==
=== Club ===
Santos

- Campeonato Paulista: 1967, 1968, 1969, 1973, 1978
- Campeonato Brasileiro Série A: 1968
- Intercontinental Champions' Supercup: 1968

Nacional

- Campeonato Amazonense: 1981

=== International ===
Brazil

- FIFA World Cup: 1970
- Roca Cup: 1971
