= Djalma Dias =

Brazilian footballer (1939–1990)

Personal information
- Full name: Djalma Pereira Dias Júnior
- Date of birth: August 21, 1939
- Place of birth: Rio de Janeiro, Brazil
- Date of death: May 1, 1990 (aged 50)
- Place of death: Rio de Janeiro, Brazil
- Height: 1.77 m (5 ft 10 in)
- Position: Defender

Senior career*
Years	Team	Apps	(Gls)
1959–1961	América (RJ)		
1962–1968	Palmeiras		
1968	Atlético Mineiro		
1969–1970	Santos		
1971–1974	Botafogo		

International career
1962–1969	Brazil	16	(0)
- * Club domestic league appearances and goals

Djalma Pereira Dias Júnior (21 August 1939 – 1 May 1990) was a Brazilian footballer who played as a defender.

== Football career ==
During his career, Djalma Dias played for América Football Club - where he won the Rio state championship of 1960 -, Sociedade Esportiva Palmeiras, Clube Atlético Mineiro, Santos Futebol Clube and Botafogo de Futebol e Regatas, retiring in 1974 at the age of 35.

He played 21 times for the Brazil national team, but did not attend any major international tournament. He died of cardiorespiratory arrest at the age of 50.

== Personal ==
He was born in Rio de Janeiro and lived there all his life. One of Djalma Dias' sons, Djalminha, was also a footballer, a talented attacking midfielder who played for Deportivo de La Coruña, retiring in 2004.
