= 1968–69 Recopa Sudamericana =

Supercopa de Campeones Intercontinentaless de 1968
Tournament details
- Teams: 5

Final positions
- Champions: (Brazil) Santos
- Runners-up: (Uruguay) Peñarol

Tournament statistics
- Matches played: 6
- Goals scored: 16 (2.67 per match)
- Top goal scorer(s): (Brazil) Wálter Machado da Silva (Uruguay) Pedro Rocha (3 goals each)

The 1968 Supercopa de Campeones Intercontinentales was a knock-out association football competition between the South American winners of the Intercontinental Cup up to 1968. Three teams competed in a league system, playing each other twice, and Brazilian club Santos won the trophy.

== Eligible clubs ==
South American zone
Team	Country	Qualification
Peñarol	Uruguay	Winners of the 1961 and 1966 Intercontinental Cup
Santos	Brazil	Winners of the 1962 and 1963 Intercontinental Cup
Racing	Argentina	Winners of the 1967 Intercontinental Cup

=== Results ===
Team	Pld	W	D	L	GF	GA	GD	Pts
(Brazil) Santos	4	3	0	1	6	5	+1	6
(Uruguay) Peñarol	4	2	1	1	7	2	+5	5
(Argentina) Racing	4	0	1	3	3	9	−6	1

=== Matches ===
13 November 1968

Peñarol (Uruguay)	3 – 0	(Argentina) Racing
Rocha 38'; Spencer 58'; Carrera 84'

Estadio Centenario, Montevideo
Referee: Romualdo Arppi Filho (Brazil)

19 November 1968

Santos (Brazil)	2 – 0	(Argentina) Racing
Pelé 35'; Edu 57'

Estádio Parque Antárctica, São Paulo
Referee: Esteban Marino (Uruguay)

21 November 1968

Santos (Brazil)	1 – 0	(Uruguay) Peñarol
Clodoaldo 68'

Estádio Jornalista Mário Filho (Maracanã), Rio de Janeiro
Referee: Aurelio Bossolino (Argentina)

16 April 1969

Racing (Argentina)	2 – 3	(Brazil) Santos
da Silva 10', 87'		Toninho Guerreiro 47', 52'; Negreiros 88'

Estadio Juan Domingo Perón, Avellaneda
Referee: Armando Pena Rocha (Uruguay)

19 April 1969

Peñarol (Uruguay)	3 – 0	(Brazil) Santos
Ramos ?' (o.g.); Rocha 56', 70' (pen.)

Estadio Centenario, Montevideo
Referee: Guillermo Nimo (Argentina)

22 May 1969

Racing (Argentina)	1 – 1	(Uruguay) Peñarol
da Silva 44'		Basile 12' (o.g.)

Estadio Juan Domingo Perón, Avellaneda
Referee: Arnaldo Cézar Coelho (Brazil)

=== Scorers ===
3 goals

- (Uruguay) Pedro Rocha (Peñarol)
- (Brazil) Wálter Machado da Silva (Racing)

2 goals

- (Brazil) Toninho Guerreiro (Santos)

1 goal

- (Ecuador) Polo Carrera (Peñarol)
- (Brazil) Clodoaldo (Santos)
- (Brazil) Edú (Santos)
- (Brazil) Negreiros (Santos)
- (Brazil) Pelé (Santos)
- (Ecuador) Alberto Spencer (Peñarol)

Own goals

- (Argentina) Alfio Basile (Racing; for Peñarol)
- (Argentina) José Ramos Delgado (Santos; for Peñarol)
