= Giovanni Vastola =

Italian footballer

Personal information
- Date of birth: 20 April 1938
- Place of birth: San Valentino Torio, Italy
- Date of death: 19 January 2017 (aged 78)
- Place of death: Ravenna, Italy
- Height: 1.72 m (5 ft 7 1/2 in)
- Position: Midfielder

Senior career*
Years	Team	Apps	(Gls)
1958–1961	Fiamme d'Oro Roma		
1961–1965	L.R. Vicenza	98	(23)
1965–1967	Bologna	28	(13)
1967–1968	Varese	27	(7)
1968–1969	Internazionale	15	(7)
1969–1971	Bologna	6	(2)
1971–1972	Sorrento	14	(1)
1972–1973	Piacenza	26	(?)
1973–1974	Derthona	9	(1)
- * Club domestic league appearances and goals

Giovanni Vastola (20 April 1938 – 19 January 2017) was an Italian professional footballer who played as a winger. He died in Ravenna on 19 January 2017 at the age of 78.
