= José Ramos Delgado =

Argentine footballer & manager (1935–2010)

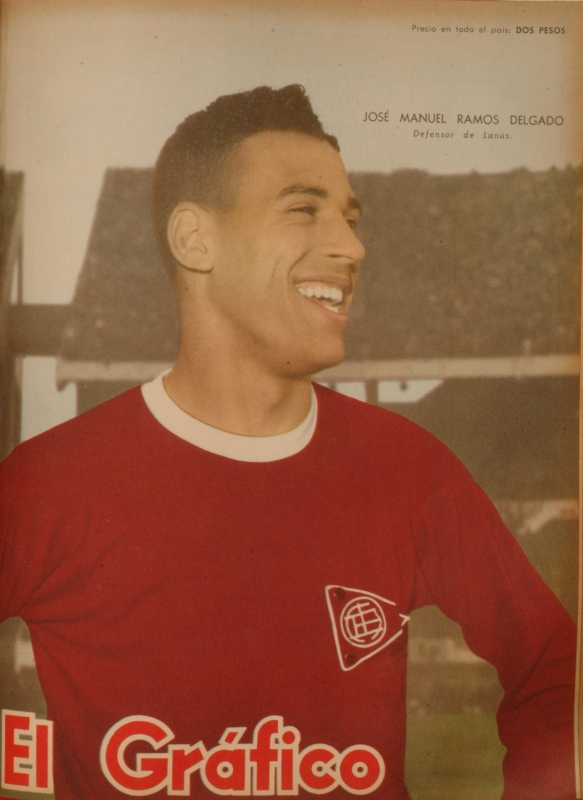
- Ramos Delgado with Lanús' jersey in 1956.

Personal information
- Full name: José Manuel Ramos Delgado
- Date of birth: 25 August 1935
- Place of birth: Quilmes, Buenos Aires, Argentina
- Date of death: 3 December 2010 (aged 75)
- Place of death: Villa Elisa, Buenos Aires, Argentina
- Position: Defender

Youth career
- Quilmes

Senior career*
Years	Team	Apps	(Gls)
1956–1958	Lanús	51	(0)
1959–1965	River Plate	172	(0)
1966–1967	Banfield	57	(0)
1967–1973	Santos	324	(1)
1973–1974	Portuguesa Santista		
Total		604	(1)

International career
1958–1965	Argentina	25	(0)

Managerial career
- 1977–1978: Santos
- 1978: Belgrano
- 1980: All Boys
- 1981: Claypole
- 1982: River Plate
- 1983–1984: Universitario
- 1985–1986: Deportivo Maipú
- 1987: Estudiantes LP
- 1987–1988: Platense
- 1989–1990: Gimnasia La Plata
- 1991: Quilmes
- 1991: Deportivo Maipú
- 1992–1993: Chaco For Ever
- 1993–1994: Talleres
- 1995: Santos U20
- * Club domestic league appearances and goals

José Manuel Ramos Delgado (25 August 1935 – 3 December 2010) was an Argentine footballer and manager. He played for the Argentina national football team in two World Cups and had a successful tenure in Brazilian football with Santos. He went on to become a football manager, working in Argentina and Peru.

== Early life ==
Ramos Delgado was born in the city of Quilmes, Argentina. He belonged to the Cape Verdean community in Argentina, as his father was a native of the islands, born in São Vicente.

== Playing career ==
=== Club ===
Ramos Delgado started his playing career in 1956 with Lanús. He soon earned a move to River Plate where he played 172 games in seven seasons with the club.

In 1966, Ramos Delgado joined Banfield. After a short spell with the club, he moved to Brazil to play for Santos, where he played alongside Pelé, Coutinho and José Macia in the club's golden years. He continued playing for Santos until the age of 38, making a total of 324 appearances and scoring one goal.

In the last year of his playing career, Delgado played for Portuguesa Santista. He retired at the age of 39.

=== National team ===
Between 1958 and 1965, Ramos Delgado played 25 times for the Argentina national football team. He was included in the squads for the 1958 and 1962 FIFA World Cups, and played in the qualifiers for the 1966 World Cup.

== Coaching career ==
After retiring as a player, Ramos Delgado had a spell as manager of Santos, before returning to Argentina where he worked as the manager of several football clubs including Belgrano, Deportivo Maipú, Gimnasia y Esgrima La Plata, Estudiantes de La Plata, River Plate, Talleres de Córdoba, Platense, All Boys and his home town club Quilmes. He also worked as the manager of Peruvian club Universitario.

He returned to Santos to work as a youth team coach helping to develop young players such as Robinho and Diego.

== Death ==
Ramos Delgado died in a hospital in Villa Elisa on 3 December 2010, of Alzheimer's disease.

== Honours ==
=== As a player ===
River Plate

- Primera División runner-up (4): 1960, 1962, 1963, 1965

Santos

- Campeonato Paulista (4): 1967, 1968, 1969, 1973
- Campeonato Brasileiro (1): 1968
- Recopa Intercontinental (1): 1968

Argentina

- Taça das Nações: 1964
