= Antoninho (footballer, born 1921) =

Brazilian footballer and manager

Personal information
- Full name: Antônio Fernandes
- Date of birth: 13 August 1921
- Place of birth: Santos, Brazil
- Date of death: 16 December 1973 (aged 52)
- Place of death: Santos, Brazil
- Position: Midfielder

Youth career
- São Paulo do Marapé
- Theodor Wille
- Santos

Senior career*
Years	Team	Apps	(Gls)
1941–1954	Santos		
1950	→ Palmeiras (loan)		
1955–1956	Jabaquara		

Managerial career
- 1951: Santos (player-manager)
- 1953: Santos (player-manager)
- 1959: Canto do Rio
- 1960–1962: Brazil Olympic
- 1962–1963: Atlético Mineiro
- 1963: Fluminense
- 1963–1964: Brazil Olympic
- 1964–1965: Remo
- 1965: Náutico
- 1966: Remo
- 1967–1971: Santos
- 1968: Brazil Olympic
- 1968: Brazil
- 1971: Náutico
- 1971–1972: Brazil Olympic
- 1973: Figueirense
- 1973: Noroeste
- * Club domestic league appearances and goals

Antônio Fernandes, also known as Antoninho (Portuguese pronunciation: [ɐ̃toˈnĩɲu]) (13 August 1921 – 16 December 1973), was a Brazilian professional football player and manager. He was nicknamed O arquiteto da bola ("architect of the ball") after São Paulo's victorious campaign in the Campeonato Brasileiro de Seleções Estaduais in 1952. At Santos, he would play 400 games from 1941 to 1954, scoring 145 goals. In 1948 and 1950, his team finished as high as second in São Paulo. After leaving Santos, he would play two more seasons at Jabaquara before ending his playing career.

He then became an assistant coach at Santos under Lula, and later head coach for Atlético Mineiro. He returned to Santos once again to take over for Lula in 1966, leading Os Santásticos to their second Campeonato Paulista title. In 1968, they won the Torneio Roberto Gomes Pedrosa, predecessor to the Brasileirão, and the Recopa Sudamericana, along with many other domestic and international tournaments. Upon leaving Santos in 1971, he was replaced by fellow Peixe great Mauro Ramos.
