= Silva Batuta =

Brazilian footballer (1940–2020)

Silva Batuta/Machado da Silva
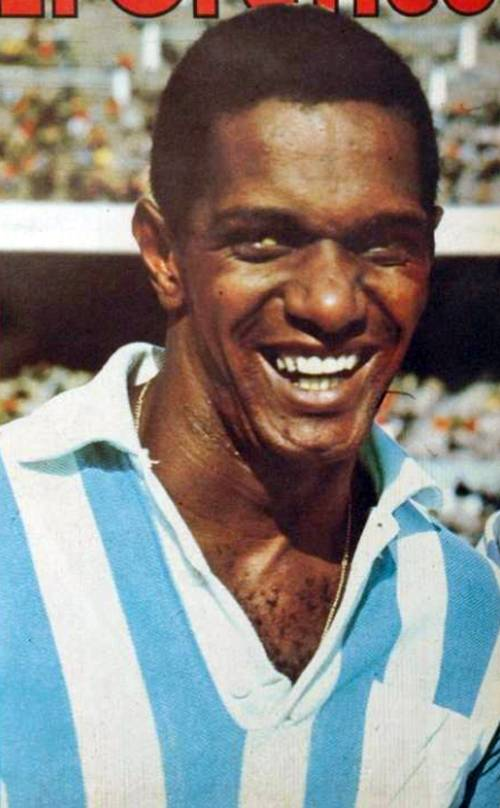
- Machado da Silva in the jersey of Racing Club

Personal information
- Full name: Wálter Machado da Silva
- Date of birth: 2 January 1940
- Place of birth: Ribeirão Preto, Brazil
- Date of death: 29 September 2020 (aged 80)
- Place of death: Rio de Janeiro, Brazil
- Position: Striker

Youth career
- 1955–1957: São Paulo

Senior career*
Years	Team	Apps	(Gls)
1957–1959	São Paulo	8	(0)
1958–1959	→ Batatais FC (loan)	17	(6)
1959–1961	Botafogo-SP	62	(24)
1962–1966	Corinthians	84	(62)
1965–1966	→ Flamengo (loan)	31	(20)
1967–1969	Barcelona	-	(-)
1967	→ Santos (loan)	14	(7)
1968–1969	→ Flamengo (loan)	22	(11)
1969	Racing	28	(18)
1970–1973	Vasco da Gama	37	(9)
1971	→ Botafogo (loan)	13	(2)
1973	Atlético Junior	15	(4)
1973	Rio Negro-AM	11	(3)
1974	Tiquire Flores		

International career
1966	Brazil	6	(2)
- * Club domestic league appearances and goals

Wálter Machado da Silva (2 January 1940 – 29 September 2020), better known as "Silva Batuta" in Brazil, or Machado da Silva in Argentina, was a Brazilian footballer.

He earned 6 caps (3 non-official) for the Brazil national football team and was part of the Brazilian squad at the 1966 FIFA World Cup.

Silva Batuta died on 29 September 2020 at the age of 80 from COVID-19.

== Honours ==
São Paulo

- Campeonato Paulista: 1957

Flamengo

- Campeonato Carioca: 1965

Santos

- Campeonato Paulista: 1967

Vasco

- Campeonato Carioca: 1970
