= 1969 Campeonato Paulista =

Campeonato Paulista – Série A1
- Season: 1969
- Champions: Santos
- Torneio Roberto Gomes Pedrosa: Santos; Palmeiras; São Paulo; Corinthians; Portuguesa
- Matches played: 188
- Goals scored: 523 (2.78 per match)
- Best Player: Pelé (Santos)
- Top goalscorer: Pelé (Santos) – 26 goals
- Biggest home win: Palmeiras 6-1 Juventus (April 16, 1969)
- Biggest away win: XV de Piracicaba 0-5 Corinthians (March 5, 1969)
- Highest scoring: Santos 6-2 XV de Piracicaba (February 14, 1969)

The 1969 Campeonato Paulista da Divisão Especial de Futebol Profissional, organized by the Federação Paulista de Futebol, was the 68th season of São Paulo's top professional football league. Santos won the title for the 12th time. No teams were relegated. After a gap of three years, Santos's Pelé was again the top scorer with 26 goals. Pelé had previously been the league's top goal scorer for nine years in a row, from 1957 to 1965.

== Championship ==
The championship was divided into two stages:

- First stage: The fourteen teams were divided into two groups of seven teams, and each played in a double round-robin format against the teams of its own group and the other group. the two best teams in each group qualified to the Final round.
- Final round: The remaining four teams played in a single round-robin format against each other and the team with the most points won the title.

=== First stage ===
==== Group A ====
Pos	Team	Pld	W	D	L	GF	GA	GD	Pts	Qualification or relegation
1	Santos	26	17	3	6	60	30	+30	37	Qualified
2	Palmeiras	26	17	2	7	46	19	+27	36	Qualified
3	Portuguesa	26	12	5	9	41	37	+4	29	
4	Ferroviária	26	10	6	10	29	35	−6	26	
5	Portuguesa Santista	26	8	7	11	36	41	−5	23	
6	XV de Piracicaba	26	5	11	10	30	41	−11	21	
7	Juventus	26	7	6	13	28	37	−9	20	

Updated to match(es) played on July 27, 1969. Source: RSSSF.com
Rules for classification: 1) points; 2) goal difference; 3) wins; 4) number of goals scored.

==== Group B ====
Pos	Team	Pld	W	D	L	GF	GA	GD	Pts	Qualification or relegation
1	Corinthians	26	16	4	6	51	24	+27	36	Qualified
2	São Paulo	26	16	2	8	44	29	+15	34	Qualified
3	Guarani	26	9	5	12	35	40	−5	23	
4	América	26	8	7	11	29	45	−16	23	
5	Botafogo	26	6	7	13	25	41	−16	19	
6	São Bento	26	6	7	13	26	45	−19	19	
7	Paulista	26	7	4	15	25	40	−15	18	

Updated to match(es) played on July 27, 1969. Source: RSSSF.com
Rules for classification: 1) points; 2) goal difference; 3) wins; 4) number of goals scored.

=== Final round ===
Pos	Team	Pld	W	D	L	GF	GA	GD	Pts	Qualification or relegation
1	Santos	3	2	1	0	6	1	+5	5	Champions
2	Palmeiras	3	2	0	1	4	5	−1	4	
3	São Paulo	3	1	1	1	3	3	0	3	
4	Corinthians	3	0	0	3	5	9	−4	0	

Updated to match(es) played on June 22, 1969. Source: RSSSF.com
Rules for classification: 1) points; 2) goal difference; 3) wins; 4) number of goals scored.

== Top Scores ==
Rank	Player	Club	Goals
1	Pelé	Santos	26
2	Luis Artime	Palmeiras	20
3	Edu	Santos	19
4	Paulo Borges	Corinthians	15
5	Benê	Corinthians	14
5	Zé Roberto	São Paulo	14
7	Rivellino	Corinthians	11
7	Babá	São Paulo	11
