= 1967 Campeonato Paulista =

Campeonato Paulista – Série A1
- Season: 1967
- Champions: Santos
- Relegated: Prudentina
- Torneio Roberto Gomes Pedrosa: Santos; Palmeiras; São Paulo; Corinthians; Portuguesa
- Matches played: 182
- Goals scored: 526 (2.89 per match)
- Best Player: Flávio (Corinthians)
- Top goalscorer: Flávio (Corinthians) – 21 goals
- Biggest home win: Guarani 6-0 Prudentina (July 30, 1967); São Paulo 6-0 Botafogo (November 4, 1967)
- Biggest away win: Juventus 0-4 Santos (July 15, 1967); Comercial 2-6 Corinthians (August 27, 1968)
- Highest scoring: Comercial 2-6 Corinthians (August 27, 1967)

The 1967 Campeonato Paulista de Futebol da Divisão Especial de Profissionais, organized by the Federação Paulista de Futebol, was the 66th season of São Paulo's top professional football league. Santos won the title for the 10th time. Prudentina was relegated. The top scorer was Corinthians's Flávio, with 21 goals.

== Championship ==
The championship was disputed in a double-round robin system, with the team with the most points winning the title and the team with the fewest points being relegated.

Pos	Team	Pld	W	D	L	GF	GA	GD	Pts	Qualification or relegation
1	São Paulo	26	16	9	1	53	15	+38	41	Playoffs
2	Santos	26	16	9	1	61	32	+29	41	Playoffs
3	Corinthians	26	15	7	4	54	25	+29	37	
4	Palmeiras	26	14	7	5	43	35	+8	35	
5	Portuguesa	26	12	5	9	40	36	+4	29	
6	Ferroviária	26	9	6	11	26	28	−2	24	
7	América	26	9	5	12	41	41	0	23	
8	Guarani	26	8	5	13	34	36	−2	21	
9	São Bento	26	6	8	12	25	38	−13	20	
10	Botafogo	26	7	6	13	38	55	−17	20	
11	Comercial	26	9	2	15	35	53	−18	20	
12	Portuguesa Santista	26	7	5	14	24	38	−14	19	
13	Juventus	26	6	6	14	26	43	−17	18	
14	Prudentina	26	6	4	16	26	51	−25	16	Relegated

Updated to match(es) played on December 19, 1967. Source: RSSSF.com
Rules for classification: 1) points; 2) goal difference; 3) wins; 4) number of goals scored.

=== Playoffs ===
21 December 1967

Santos	2 – 1	São Paulo
Edu 10'; Toninho Guerreiro 12'		Babá 85'

Pacaembu, São Paulo
Attendance: 43,627
Referee: Armando Marques

== Top Scores ==
Rank	Player	Club	Goals
1	Flávio Minuano	Corinthians	21
2	Babá	São Paulo	17
3	Toninho Guerreiro	Santos	16
4	Pelé	Santos	15
5	Tupãzinho	Palmeiras	10
5	Adílson	São Paulo	10
5	Ratinho	Portuguesa	10
5	Parada	Guaraní	10
5	Marco Antônio	Comercial	10
10	Rivellino	Corinthians	9
