= Intercontinental Champions' Supercup =

Intercontinental Supercup
- Intercontinental Supercup thophy exhibited at the Peñarol Museum
- Organiser(s): UEFA; CONMEBOL
- Founded: 1968
- Abolished: 1970; 56 years ago
- Region: Europe; South America
- Teams: 4
- Related competitions: Intercontinental Cup
- Most championships: (Brazil) Santos (Uruguay) Peñarol (1 title each)

The Intercontinental Champions' Supercup, commonly referred to as the Intercontinental Supercup or Recopa Intercontinental, was a football competition endorsed by UEFA and CONMEBOL, contested by the past winners of the Intercontinental Cup. The first Intercontinental Cup had been contested in 1960, resulting in a pool of 5 past champions (two from UEFA, three from CONMEBOL) available to contest for the first Intercontinental Supercup, in 1968. The pool increased to 6 past champions for the 1969 Intercontinental Supercup, but the two past champions from UEFA chose not to participate, resulting in the winner of the CONMEBOL preliminary round being declared the Supercup winner. No further competitions were contested thereafter.

The tournament went unrecognised for many years, until in September 2005 it was officially recognised by CONMEBOL, and listed as an "official competition".

== History ==
The idea for the tournament was put forth by club officials of the three South American teams that had won the Intercontinental Cup—Peñarol, Santos, and Racing. In November 1968, the tournament was announced in Buenos Aires. Earlier that year in September, Estudiantes de La Plata had defeated Manchester United in the 1968 Intercontinental Cup but would not be included in the immediate 1968 Intercontinental Supercup. Instead, Estudiantes would be present in the 1969 edition. The corresponding UEFA officials were contacted and the tournament was scheduled to start in November and include Real Madrid and Inter in addition to the three past South American Intercontinental Cup winners.

The first competition was divided into the South American Zone and the European Zone. In the South American Zone, the 3 South American participants played a round-robin tournament, whilst in the European Zone, Real Madrid and Internazionale were to play each other over two legs. Each zone winner advanced to the final. Real Madrid withdrew from playing in the tournament and, thus, Inter advanced without playing. The first round of matches were played in November between the 3 South American clubs, and the second round of matches were played in April and May 1969. Santos finished ahead of Peñarol and Racing Club and were to play Inter in June for the cup.

The first leg of the final was played in Milan, at the Stadio Giuseppe Meazza. Santos won 1–0. The second leg was to be played in September in Naples, Italy; however, Inter declined to play and Santos won by default.

The second competition–now including Estudiantes–also failed to complete. Both Real Madrid and Inter declined to compete as the 1970 FIFA World Cup qualification was underway in Europe. Hence, only the South American Zone portion of the tournament was played, starting in November and culminating in December. Peñarol finished first and was declared the South American Zone champion after no European team was available to compete.

A third edition was slated for 1970 by CONMEBOL with two new European teams being eligible to play–Italian A.C. Milan and Dutch Feyenoord; however it was never held because of the lack of European interest. The tournament was postponed three times into 1971 until it was finally cancelled.

The tournament went unrecognised for many years until in September 2005, these titles were officially recognised by the CONMEBOL despite their improper conclusions.

== Eligible teams ==
These were the only teams eligible to compete in the tournament at the time it was hosted.

Team	Years won (Intercont. Cup)	Editions played
(Spain) Real Madrid	1960	(None)
(Uruguay) Peñarol	1961, 1966	1968, 1969
(Brazil) Santos	1962, 1963	1968, 1969
(Italy) Internazionale	1964, 1965	1968
(Argentina) Racing	1967	1968, 1969
(Argentina) Estudiantes LP	1968	1969
(Italy) Milan	1969	(None) (Note: The 1970 Intercontinental Supercup was not held and the tournament discontinued due to lack of interest from European clubs.)
(Netherlands) Feyenoord	1970	(None)

== Results ==
Ed.	Year	Winner	Score	Runner-up	Venue	City
1	1968	(Brazil) Santos	1–0	(Italy) Internazionale	San Siro	Milan, Italy
2	1969	(Uruguay) Peñarol	– (Note: No final held. Peñarol accumulated the most points in the South American group, therefore they were crowned champion of the competition. The squad played a total of 11 matches in a double round-robin format against Estudiantes (LP), Racing and Santos FC. No European clubs took part of the championship.)	(Argentina) Racing	–	–

== Goalscorers ==
Year	Scorer	Club	Goals
1968	(Uruguay) Pedro Rocha	(Uruguay) Peñarol	3
1968	(Brazil) Walter Machado da Silva	(Argentina) Racing	3
1968	(Brazil) Toninho	(Brazil) Santos	3
1969	(Uruguay) Pedro Rocha	(Uruguay) Peñarol	6

== See also ==
- Intercontinental Cup
