= 1996 Copa de Oro =

1996 Copa de Oro Nicolás Leoz 1996 Copa de Ouro Nicolás Leoz

Tournament details
- Host country: Brazil
- City: Manaus
- Dates: August 13 - August 16
- Teams: 4 (from 1 confederation)
- Venue: 1 (in 1 host city)

Final positions
- Champions: (Brazil) Flamengo (1st title)
- Runners-up: (Brazil) São Paulo

Tournament statistics
- Matches played: 3
- Goals scored: 10 (3.33 per match)
- Top scorer: (Brazil) Sávio (3 goals)

The 1996 Copa de Oro was the third and last Copa de Oro, a football competition for the reigning champions of CONMEBOL's Copa Libertadores, the Supercopa Libertadores, the Copa CONMEBOL, and the Copa Master de CONMEBOL; the latter competition replaced the berth taken by the winners of the Copa Master de Supercopa. It took place in Manaus, Brazil from August 13 to August 16.

It was the first and only time the competition was hosted by a single nation and all the matches were played at the Vivaldão. The competition was contested by Grêmio, winners of the 1995 Copa Libertadores, Flamengo, runners-up of the 1995 Supercopa Libertadores, Rosario Central, winners of the 1995 Copa CONMEBOL, and São Paulo, winners of the 1996 Copa Master de Conmebol. Independiente, winners of the previous Supercopa Libertadores, declined to participate as they had in 1995.

In the semifinals, Flamengo defeated Rosario Central 2-1, while São Paulo dispatched Grêmio by the same score. In the final, Flamengo beat São Paulo by 3-1 and won the last Copa de Oro title.

== Participating teams ==
Team	Honor
(Brazil) Grêmio	Winners of the 1995 Copa Libertadores
(Brazil) Flamengo	Runners-up of the 1995 Supercopa Libertadores
(Argentina) Rosario Central	Winners of the 1995 Copa CONMEBOL
(Brazil) São Paulo	Winners of the 1996 Copa Master de CONMEBOL

== Knockout bracket ==
Semifinals
1	(Brazil) Flamengo	2
4	(Argentina) Rosario Central	1
3	(Brazil) São Paulo	2
2	(Brazil) Grêmio	1

Final
(Brazil) Flamengo	3
(Brazil) São Paulo	1

== Semifinals ==
August 13, 1996

Flamengo (Brazil)	2 – 1	(Argentina) Rosario Central
Baiano 7', 63'		Montoya 10'

Vivaldão, Manaus

August 14, 1996

São Paulo (Brazil)	2 – 1	(Brazil) Grêmio
Adriano 52'; Müller 59'		Emerson 63'

Vivaldão, Manaus

== Final ==
August 16, 1996

Flamengo (Brazil)	3 – 1	(Brazil) São Paulo
Sávio 16' (pen.), 57', 82'		Aristizábal 33'

Vivaldão, Manaus
Referee: Epifanio González (Paraguay)

Flamengo	São Paulo

GK	1	(Brazil) Roger
RB	2	(Brazil) Paulo César
CB	3	(Brazil) Fabiano
CB	4	(Brazil) Ronaldão (c)
LB	6	(Brazil) Gilberto
DM	7	(Brazil) Márcio Costa
DM	5	(Argentina) Alejandro Mancuso
AM	11	(Brazil) Fábio Baiano	(yellow card) 68'	(substituted off) 70'
AM	9	(Brazil) Nélio		(substituted off) 87'
FW	8	(Brazil) Marques
FW	10	(Brazil) Sávio
Substitutes:
MF	15	(Brazil) Iranildo		(substituted on) 70'
DF	14	(Brazil) Athirson		(substituted on) 87'
Manager:
(Brazil) Joel Santana

GK	1	(Brazil) Rogério Ceni
RB	2	(Brazil) Luisinho Netto
CB	3	(Brazil) Pedro Luís (c)	(yellow card) 64'
CB	4	(Brazil) Bordon
LB	6	(Brazil) Guilherme	(red card) 60'
DM	8	(Brazil) Edmílson	(yellow card) 13'
DM	5	(Brazil) Belletti		(substituted off) 72'
AM	10	(Brazil) Sandoval		(substituted off) 64'
AM	11	(Brazil) André Luiz
FW	7	(Colombia) Víctor Aristizábal
FW	9	(Brazil) Valdir		(substituted off) 64'
Substitutes:
MF	16	(Brazil) Fábio Mello		(substituted on) 72'
MF	15	(Brazil) Adriano		(substituted on) 64'
FW	17	(Brazil) França		(substituted on) 64'
Manager:
(Brazil) Carlos Alberto Parreira

== Top goalscorers ==
3 goals

- (Brazil) Sávio

2 goals

- (Brazil) Fabio Baiano

1 goal

- (Brazil) Adriano
- (Brazil) Müller
- (Brazil) Emerson
- (Colombia) Víctor Aristizábal
- (Argentina) Eduardo Montoya
