= 1996 Copa dos Campeões Mundiais =

Tournament details
- Country: Brazil
- Dates: 28 June–18 July
- Teams: 4

Final positions
- Champions: São Paulo
- Runners-up: Flamengo
- Third place: Santos
- Fourth place: Grêmio

Tournament statistics
- Matches played: 7
- Goals scored: 14 (2 per match)
- Top goal scorer(s): Jamelli (Santos); Romário (Flamengo); Valdir (São Paulo); 2 goals

The 1996 Copa dos Campeões Mundiais was the second edition of the Copa dos Campeões Mundiais. São Paulo FC has won their second title.

== Participants ==
Club	Intercontinental Cup edition winners
Santos	1962, 1963
Flamengo	1981
Grêmio	1983
São Paulo	1992, 1993

== First stage ==
28 June

São Paulo (São Paulo (state))	1–1	(São Paulo (state)) Santos
Müller 30'		Jamelli 9'

Estádio Governador José Fragelli, Cuiabá
Referee: Carlos Eugênio Simon

3 July

Grêmio (Rio Grande do Sul)	0–3	(São Paulo (state)) São Paulo
		Valdir 32'; Rivarola 38' (o.g.); Denílson 74'

Estádio Mané Garrincha, Brasília
Referee: Carlos Elias Pimentel

5 July

Santos (São Paulo (state))	1–0	(Rio Grande do Sul) Grêmio
Jamelli 89'

Estádio Governador José Fragelli, Cuiabá
Referee: Joelmes Jesus da Costa

9 July

Flamengo (Rio de Janeiro (state))	0–0	(São Paulo (state)) São Paulo

Estádio Mané Garrincha, Brasília
Referee: Francisco Dacildo Mourão

12 July

Grêmio (Rio Grande do Sul)	0–2	(Rio de Janeiro (state)) Flamengo
		Romário 40'; Fábio Baiano 88'

Estádio Governador José Fragelli, Cuiabá
Referee: Sidrack Marinho

16 July

Flamengo (Rio de Janeiro (state))	2–1	(São Paulo (state)) Santos
Marques 21'; Nélio 57'		Sandro 39'

Estádio Mané Garrincha, Brasília
Referee: Luciano de Almeida

=== Standings ===
Team	Pts	P	W	D	L	GF	GA	GD
(Rio de Janeiro (state)) Flamengo	7	3	2	1	0	4	1	3
(São Paulo (state)) São Paulo	5	3	1	2	0	4	1	3
(São Paulo (state)) Santos	4	3	1	1	1	3	3	0
(Rio Grande do Sul) Grêmio	0	3	0	0	3	0	6	-6

== Final ==
18 July

Flamengo (Rio de Janeiro (state))	1–2	(São Paulo (state)) São Paulo
Romário 14' (pen.)		Adriano 3'; Valdir 34'

Estádio Mané Garrincha, Brasília
Referee: Sidrack Marinho

Flamengo
São Paulo

GK	1	Roger
DF	2	Alcir (substituted off)
DF	3	Fabiano
DF	4	Ronaldão
DF	6	Gilberto
MF	5	Djair
MF	8	Marques
MF	7	Márcio Costa
MF	10	Iranildo
FW	9	Nélio (red card)
FW	11	Romário (substituted off)
Substitutes:
FW	16	Aloísio	Substituted in
MF	14	Fábio Baiano	Substituted in
Manager:
Joel Santana

GK	1	Zetti
DF	2	Belletti
DF	3	Válber
DF	4	Bordon
DF	6	Serginho (substituted off)
MF	5	Axel
MF	8	Edmílson
MF	10	Adriano (substituted off)
MF	11	Denílson
FW	9	Valdir (substituted off)
FW	7	Müller
Substitutes:
DF	18	Guilherme	Substituted in
MF	16	Sandoval	Substituted in
DF	15	Pedro Luís	Substituted in
Manager:
Muricy Ramalho

=== Champion ===
1996 Copa dos Campeões Mundiais
(São Paulo (state))
São Paulo
2nd. title
