= Rui Campos =

Brazilian footballer

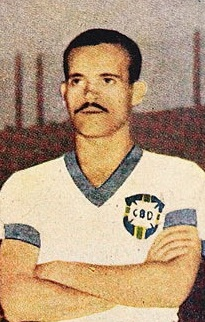
- Rui in 1946

Personal information
- Full name: Rui Campos
- Date of birth: 2 August 1922
- Place of birth: São Paulo, Brazil
- Date of death: 2 January 2002 (aged 79)
- Place of death: São Paulo, Brazil
- Position: Midfielder

Senior career*
Years	Team	Apps	(Gls)
- Bonsucesso
- Fluminense
- Bangu
- São Paulo
- Palmeiras

International career
1944–1950	Brazil	30	(2)
Medal record
Men's Football
Representing Brazil
FIFA World Cup
Runner-up	1950 Brazil
Copa América
Winner	1949 Brazil
Runner-up	1945 Chile
Runner-up	1946 Argentina
- * Club domestic league appearances and goals

Rui Campos or Rui (2 August 1922 – 2 January 2002) was a Brazilian football player. He played for the Brazil in the 1950 FIFA World Cup.

== Career ==
Born in São Paulo, He played for Bonsucesso, Fluminense, Bangu, São Paulo and Palmeiras during his career. At São Paulo, he formed a successful midfield trio with José Carlos Bauer and Alfredo Noronha.

=== National team ===
Rui Campos played 30 matches for the Brazil national team between 1944 and 1950, including 1950 FIFA World Cup matches.

== Honours ==
São Paulo

- Campeonato Paulista: 1945, 1946, 1948, 1949

Brazil

- Copa América: 1949
- FIFA World Cup runner-up: 1950

Individual

- Campeonato Paulista Team of the Tournament: 1946, 1947, 1948, 1949
