= Belletti =

Belletti is a surname. Notable people with the surname include:

- Giovanni Belletti (1813–1890), Italian opera singer
- Giulio Belletti (born 1957), Italian volleyball player
- Juliano Belletti (born 1976), Brazilian footballer
- Manuel Belletti (born 1985), Italian cyclist
- Paolo Belletti (17th century), Italian scientific instrument maker

== See also ==
- Belletto
