= Sorlei =

Brazilian footballer

Personal information
- Full name: Sorlei Mulari Crudzinski
- Date of birth: 13 September 1973 (age 53)
- Place of birth: Paranavaí, Brazil
- Height: 1.81 m (5 ft 11 in)
- Position: Centre-back

Senior career*
Years	Team	Apps	(Gls)
1992–1994	Coritiba		
1995–1996	Fluminense		
1996	São Paulo	22	(0)
1996–2000	Guarani		
2000	ABC		
2001	Vila Nova		
2001	Bragantino		
2002	Portuguesa Santista		
- * Club domestic league appearances and goals as of 30 August 2023

Sorlei Mulari Crudzinski (born 13 September 1973), simply known as Sorlei, is a Brazilian former professional footballer who played as a centre-back.

== Career ==
Considered short in stature, Sorlei stood out mainly for his ability to disarm. He ended his career at the age of 28 due to successive injuries.

== Honours ==
Fluminense

- Campeonato Carioca: 1995

São Paulo

- Copa Masters CONMEBOL: 1996
