= Pedro Luís =

Pedro Luís may refer to:

- Pedro Luís e a Parede, Brazilian musical group
- Pedro Luís Pereira de Sousa, Brazilian poet and politician
- Pedro Luiz of Orléans-Braganza, Brazilian prince
- Pedro Luís Vitorino, Brazilian footballer
