= Edinho (footballer, born 1966) =

Brazilian footballer

Personal information
- Full name: Édson José Vichetin
- Date of birth: 5 July 1966 (age 60)
- Place of birth: Leme, Brazil
- Position: Right back

Senior career*
| Years | Team | Apps | (Gls) |
| 1987–1988 | Sãocarlense | | |
| 1988–1989 | União São João | | |
| 1990 | Rio Preto | | |
| 1991 | Democrata-GV | | |
| 1992–1994 | União São João | | |
| 1995 | Portuguesa | | |
| 1996 | São Paulo | 22 | (0) |
| 1996 | Internacional | | |
| 1997 | Portuguesa | | |
| 1998 | Inter de Limeira | | |
| 1999 | Portuguesa Santista | | |
- * Club domestic league appearances and goals as of 11 October 2023

Édson José Vichetin (born 5 July 1966), better known as Edinho, is a Brazilian former professional footballer who played as a right back.

== Career ==
A right-back with speed and good throws, Edinho began his career at Sãocarlense in 1987. In 1988, he transferred to União São João, and experienced a great moment, winning the 1988 Brasileiro Série C. In 1995 at Portuguesa, he was the player who provided the most assists in the Campeonato Paulista, moving the following year to São Paulo, where he won the CONMEBOL Masters Cup. In the second half of the year he was negotiated with Internacional, where he alternated between good and bad times. He returned to Portuguesa in 1997 and then played only in clubs in the state of São Paulo.

== Honours ==
União São João

- Campeonato Brasileiro Série C: 1988

São Paulo

- Copa Masters CONMEBOL: 1996

Internacional

- Torneio Mercosul: 1996
