= Belletto =

Belletto is an historical surname that arose in what is today northeastern Italy, specifically within the Patriarchate of Aquileia—an early medieval ecclesiastical and political jurisdiction of the Holy Roman Empire encompassing modern-day Friuli, as well as parts of Veneto and Trentino-Alto Adige. It is subsequently recorded in regions further west such as Lombardy and Piedmont, as well as other adjacent Holy Roman or Habsburg-administered territories, including the Republic of Venice, beginning in the early 14th century. The name appears in various Latin administrative records and is associated with military and diplomatic service in Venetian-governed territories during the Late Middle Ages. Its emergence reflects established Latinization practices in regions of Germanic–Romance linguistic and cultural exchange, where vernacular names were routinely rendered into Latin for use in chancery, ecclesiastical, martial, and legal domains.

Shaped by this hybridized naming culture, the surname Belletto is morphologically consistent with a diminutive form of the Latin root bellum (“war”), and not derivative of the Italo-Romance root bello (“beautiful”), which stems from the poetic Late Latin adjective bellus—a common misattribution that does not withstand either philological scrutiny or contextual alignment with the name’s early usage. Although often presumed to be Italian in origin, Belletto predates the emergence of a unified Italian language or national identity, and is more accurately situated within the Latinized bureaucratic systems of the Germanic Alpine and Adriatic frontier of the Holy Roman Empire.

Early instances of the name, such as that of Belletto Falier, Bailo of Negroponte (1308–1310), appear in Venetian diplomatic records and indicate a context closely tied to juridical and institutional administrative functions. The geographical distribution of the surname and sociohistorical context in which it emerged do not support a derivation from vernacular Italo-Romance roots; rather, its morphology aligns with traditions of Latinization, and the semantic adaptation of Germanic surnames into Latin diminutive forms within the context of linguistically and culturally hybrid transimperial administrative spheres.

== Etymology ==
=== Latin diminutives and bureaucratic onomastics ===
The surname Belletto displays a linguistic structure characteristic of Latinized diminutive forms, particularly those derived from Germanic compound occupational names of juridical or administrative relevance in medieval bureaucratic contexts. Etymologically, it stems from the Latin root bellum ("war"), to which the diminutive suffix -ettus (masculine), or -etto in Vulgar Latin, was appended, yielding Belletto—a name meaning "little warrior" or, more contextually, "junior commander".

This construction aligns morphosyntactically and semantically with the patterns of onomastic practice in ecclesiastical and legal documentation throughout Germany, Northern Italy and the broader Holy Roman Empire, particularly within domains of Lombardic and Carolingian inheritance such as Venice and Aquileia. These naming conventions, first institutionalized during the Carolingian reforms under Charlemagne, which codified Latin as the language of governance over local Germanic varieties (e.g., Capitulare de villis, c. 770-800), were especially prevalent in the mercantile zones of the Adriatic and Alpine frontiers, where Latin remained the lingua franca well into the fourteenth century.

==== Morphology of -ettus ====
The suffix -ettus is a Late Latin variant belonging to a broader category of Latin diminutive morphemes (-inus, -ellus, -olus, -illus), used to modify nouns by reducing or recontextualizing their base meaning. As described by Wackernagel (1926) and further elaborated by Leumann (1977), Latin diminutives often served rhetorical and social functions, implying rank, youth, or derivation rather than merely size. For example:

- Paulus became Paulettus ("the lesser" or "son of") in certain Latinized genealogical registers.
- Similarly, Marcus yielded Marcellus, a well-known diminutive that retained its use as a personal and family name.
- The occupational Latin Carpentarius ("carpenter") frequently replaced the German Zimmermann in clerical documents from Trentino-Alto Adige and the Tyrol.
- Niger ("black") was often substituted for Schwarz, as found in documents from Friuli and Veneto.

Such practices remained common in regions under the jurisdiction of the Holy Roman Empire—particularly in episcopal sees, chancery offices, and mercantile centers across the Alpine and Adriatic corridor—throughout the medieval period and into the early modern era. During this time, Germanic surnames continued to be Latinized in official documents and registries in accordance with prevailing administrative conventions.

=== Latinization of Germanic compounds ===
Latinizing Germanic surnames required more than orthographic substitution; it often entailed morphosyntactic decomposition and semantic recoding within the constraints of the Latin morphological system. Because Latin disfavored synthetic compounding—commonly found in Germanic naming patterns—in favor of analytic periphrasis, scribes typically rendered compounds via semantic calquing or morphological analogization. For example:

- Kleinhans (OHG Bilithansi, meaning "Hans the younger," lit. "little Hans") might appear as Hansiolus or Johannes Minor, combining a diminutive stem with a Latin suffix or adjectival modifier.
- Similarly, compounds such as Kleinkrieger (OHG Bilithari "junior commander," lit. "little warrior") were Latinized substituting the synthetic adjectival prefix klein (bili-, "small") with the Latin diminutive suffixes (-inus, -ellus, -ettus), and the Germanic stem krieger (hri, "army" or "warrior") with Latin bellum, yielding forms like Bellicini or Belletto.

These adaptations preserved the semantic core while aligning with Latin grammatical conventions—a strategy often observed in multilingual contact zones where Latin served as the official language of record.

==== Phonosemantic adaptation of Germanic roots ====
Phonologically, the transition from the Old High German (OHG) compound Bilithari to the Latinized Belletto exemplifies a broader process of linguistic mediation spanning the evolution from OHG to Middle High German (MHG). This shift also reflects a common medieval orthographic practice of approximating Germanic stems to existing Latin lexical roots with analogous phonetic and semantic profiles. The bilabial plosive onset (b-), followed by a high front vowel (i/e), and the lateral consonant (l), creates a phonetic structure readily mapped onto Latin bellum, particularly when filtered through Vulgar Latin scribal conventions. This phenomenon of phonosemantic approximation was further facilitated by the shared martial semantics of both root forms and their relative derivational relationship through Proto-Indo-European (PIE). In this framework, beli- ("bold" or "strong") and bellum ("war") emerge as typologically convergent reflexes of related PIE stems.

While Bilithari itself derives from Old High German—spoken roughly between the 6th and 11th centuries—its anthroponymic elements persisted into the Middle High German period (ca. 1050-1350) through oral continuity and occasional preservation in semi-Latinized forms within early ecclesiastical, legal, and diplomatic records. By the 13th century, the OHG compound Bilithari would have evolved into an MHG form such as Bilhære or Bilther, consistent with attested morphological patterns in anthroponyms of the period. These forms retained the martial semantics of the original compound—'little warrior' or 'junior commander'—while conforming to the phonological and suffixal changes characteristic of MHG name formation.

Within Germanic dialect zones under Venetian or Holy Roman imperial administration (e.g., Tyrol, Carinthia, Friuli), such forms underwent further Latinization in the course of their adaptation to diplomatic, legal, or ecclesiastical registers. In the 13th-century Adriatic region, where Latin remained the dominant written medium in chancery and diplomatic contexts, these Germanic compounds were sometimes preserved in partially fossilized form and subjected to Latinization for official recordkeeping.

=== Bureaucratic legibility and transimperial onomastics ===
==== Negroponte and institutional function ====
The earliest attestation of the name within chancery records concerns Belletto Falier, who served as Bailo of Negroponte from 1308 to 1310. The office of bailo was a senior diplomatic and juridical post within the Latin-speaking bureaucracy of the Venetian colonial apparatus. Building on established post-Roman conventions—particularly those shaped by Carolingian precedence during the early medieval period—the names of individuals in these posts often reflected inherited Latinized patronyms conferring their station. Alternatively, names were legitimated through subsequent transcription into Latinate forms.

Negroponte—present-day Euboea, Greece—functioned as a Venetian mercantile hub and a vestige of Eastern Roman institutional authority in the Adriatic. Originally a Byzantine possession, the island was seized by Venice following the Fourth Crusade (1204) and the subsequent partitioning of the Byzantine Empire.

==== Phonosemantic parallels ====
Within this milieu, the semantic and symbolic resonance of the name Belletto finds a salient analogue in the legacy of Belisarius, the sixth-century magister militum of the Eastern Roman Empire under Justinian I. The stem beli- in Belisarius, derived from the East Germanic compound beli- (“strong” or “bold”) and -harjaz ("warrior" or "host"), and bellum in Belletto, drawn from the Latin root for “war” vis-à-vis the OHG root Bilithari. Morphologically, Belisarius exemplifies the integration of Germanic anthroponymy into Roman occupational nomenclature via the suffix -arius, consistent with titulature used in military and bureaucratic registers. Belletto, with its diminutive -etto suffix, similarly conforms to Latinized patterns used to recontextualize Germanic compounds within ecclesiastical and administrative usage.

=== Morphological and semantic integrity ===
By contrast, attempts to link the name Belletto to the Late Latin poetic adjective bellus ("beautiful") fail on both linguistic and historical grounds. The vernacular diminutive form of bellus (i.e., belletto), meaning "cosmetic powder" or "makeup," does not appear in Italian lexical sources until the mid-18th century, emerging out of commercial contexts rather than in formal administrative registers. As Battaglia (1961) notes, belletto as a cosmetic noun is first attested around 1750 in regional usage, far removed from the ecclesiastical and diplomatic semantic fields of medieval Latin.

Taken together, the morphological structure, semantic alignment, and documentary contexts surrounding the surname Belletto substantiate its categorization as a Latin diminutive rooted in bellum, and most plausibly a Latinization of the Germanic form Bilithari (Kleinkrieger), rather than a nominalization of later Italo-Romance poetic forms.

== History ==
=== Origins in the Adriatic (14th century) ===
Belletto Falier's documented tenure as Bailo of Negroponte (1308–1310) anchors the name within the institutional fabric of early Venetian colonial administration. The bailo was a senior magistracy within the institutional hierarchy of the Venetian Republic, overseeing governance, trade, and legal coordination in outposts of the Stato da Màr. This office functioned at the intersection of Venetian patrician authority and the administrative machinery of mercantile governance, where Latin served as the language of correspondence, law, and symbolic capital.

This early attestation also coincides with a broader geopolitical realignment in northeastern Italy and the upper Adriatic, marked by the waning secular authority of the Patriarchate of Aquileia and the concurrent expansion of Venetian and Holy Roman Imperial jurisdiction. Across the diocesan and territorial domains of Friuli, Veneto, and Trento, legal and fiscal administration continued to operate primarily in Latin, particularly in episcopal chancelleries and regional courts.

=== Diffusion across Northern Italy (15th–17th centuries) ===
Following its initial attestation in the Adriatic frontier, the surname Belletto begins to appear more widely in Northern Italian documentary sources during the fifteenth through seventeenth centuries.

In the Venetian Republic, mid-fifteenth-century records preserved in the Archivio di Stato di Venezia (regional archives) include individuals bearing the surname Belletto in subsequent contexts of elite civil and magisterial service. One such example is a Giovanni Belletto, listed in association with the Consiglio dei Dieci, the powerful executive council responsible for state security and executive governance. The surname's presence in such circles is considered to be additional evidence of its integration within Latinized bureaucratic milieus.

Further north, in the Tyrol, sixteenth-century land registries and fiscal ledgers preserved in the Tiroler Landesarchiv (regional archives) document the Belletto surname in relation to property transactions, notarial records, and occasional civic appointments in towns such as Brixen (Bressanone) and Meran (Merano). These references suggest a westward migration or diffusion of Belletto-bearing families, likely facilitated by trade networks or by bureaucratic mobility tied to Habsburg patronage. Given the region’s strategic role as a corridor between Romance and Germanic polities, these Tyrolean entries extended the geographic range of the surname.

This documentary trajectory—from the Adriatic coast to the Alpine interior—mirrors broader sociopolitical developments in the region. These include the administrative expansion of the Holy Roman Empire’s Italian holdings, the increasing presence of Germanic officials in northern Italian provinces, and the sustained practice of Latinizing vernacular surnames in Venice, Tyrol and the episcopal territories of Aquileia. These areas formed a linguistic and administrative core from which Latinized onomastic conventions gradually diffused westward into Lombardy and Piedmont, as Germanic ministerial influence and imperial bureaucratic structures expanded along the western frontier. In these records, Belletto appears alongside semantically related or morphologically parallel surnames, e.g., Bellicini, sometimes within the same extended kin groups.

=== Presence in Lombardy and Piedmont (16th–19th centuries) ===
Beyond attestations in Venetian and Tyrolean spheres, the surname Belletto appears intermittently within the archival record in western Lombardy and the Piedmont region from the late sixteenth century through the nineteenth century. Archival references housed in the Archivio Storico della Città di Torino (regional archive) and local parish registries indicate the presence of individuals bearing the Belletto surname in Turin and surrounding municipalities, particularly in clerical, military, and household census records dating from the seventeenth century onward.

The political and dynastic configuration of the region during this period was defined by the ascendancy of the House of Savoy, which maintained extensive diplomatic and marital ties with the Habsburg Monarchy and exercised administrative control over territories extending to the western Alpine frontier. Latin served as the principle medium of record in ecclesiastical and noble chancelleries well into the eighteenth century, and Latinized nomenclature remained common in military and diplomatic service appointments that traversed Germanic-Romance domains.

In Piedmontese registries, Belletto consistently appears in its Latinate form, without phonological adaptation to local dialects. A limited number of baptismal entries and military rolls preserved in the Archivio di Stato di Torino (regional archive) from the seventeenth century list individuals with this surname stationed in border garrisons or employed in administrative roles under Savoyard or Habsburg command. These include a Giovanni Belletto di Giovanni, entered in the Catasti Militari of 1714 compiled under the authority of the Duchy of Savoy, serving as an officer in the ducal militia in Pinerolo, and a Pietro Belletto, registered in the parish of San Carlo Borromeo, Turin in 1691.

=== Presence in Trentino-Alto Adige and Veneto (17th–19th centuries) ===
From the late 17th century through the 19th century, the surname Belletto is attested in Trentino-Alto Adige and Veneto, particularly within the ecclesiastical and civil registers preserved in diocesan and state archives. The regional distribution in this period suggests sustained settlement across Alpine and pre-Alpine parishes, especially in communities historically linked to the Patriarchate of Aquileia and later administered under the Holy Roman Empire and the Habsburg Monarchy.

==== Trentino-Alto Adige ====
The Archdiocese of Trento, which presided over numerous rural and mountain parishes throughout the Prince-Bishopric of Trento, records the presence of the Belletto surname in its baptismal and matrimonial registers from at least the 1690s onward. Parish archives from Val di Non, Val di Sole, and Rovereto contain references to Belletto households, often listed as small land holders, tradesmen, vintners, or minor functionaries. These entries consistently present the surname in its Latinized form.

This presence may also reflect the historical permeability of cultural and linguistic frontiers in Trentino-Alto Adige, where Germanic and Romance naming conventions frequently overlapped, especially in ecclesiastical Latin registers. In such registers, the surname Belletto often appears alongside occupational descriptors, such as faber ("smith") or vinitor ("vintner").

==== Veneto ====
Parallel evidence appears in the Veneto region, particularly in the diocesan territories of Vicenza, Padua, and Treviso, where civil and ecclesiastical registers include families named Belletto beginning in the 18th century. Unlike Trentino-Alto Adige, where parish entries primarily document rural occupations and ecclesial affiliations, these Venetian records often reflect urban professions and guild registration, especially in artisanal and commercial sectors. In Vicenza, for example, professional guilds (fraglie) operated in tandem with parish authorities to verify candidates’ origins and moral standing before issuing licenses of practice.

Records from the Archivio Storico Diocesano di Padova (regional archive) document the marriage of Giovanni Belletto and Maria Cattarina Rossetti in 1742 in the parish of Santa Maria in Vanzo, Padua, while tax censuses from the Venetian catasto ordinario list Belletto as a registered surname associated with landholding and minor guild professions.

The name's recurrence in clerical and civil registers throughout Veneto and its regional entrenchment tied to martial, artisanal, or agrarian professions mirrors patterns observed elsewhere in the Habsburg-influenced Adriatic, where Latinized Germanic names were preserved in ecclesiastical and fiscal records long after vernacular Italianization had transformed other surnames. This process of vernacularization, increasingly prominent from the Napoleonic period through Italian unification (ca. 1799-1870), involved the systematic adaptation of non-Italic surnames into local phonological norms—a policy often enacted through parish and municipal recordkeeping practices.

==== Cultural and linguistic context ====
Both Trentino-Alto Adige and Veneto were regions of active linguistic and ethnocultural mediation, where Latin remained the primary administrative language well into the 18th century. However, the decline of Latin usage varied regionally; in some areas, Latin persisted in official documents and ecclesiastical records longer than in others. For instance, in Trentino-Alto Adige, Latin continued to be used in legal and religious contexts into the late 19th century. In contrast, parts of Veneto began transitioning to vernacular Italian earlier, influenced by the rise of local dialects and the diminishing influence of Latin in administrative affairs.

Furthermore, these regions maintained administrative, religious, and marital ties with neighboring Tyrolean, Lombard, and Istrian communities, where Latinized forms of Germanic surnames remained in regular use.

=== Modern distribution (19th–21st centuries) ===
In the modern era, the surname Belletto remains relatively rare, though it continues to appear in regional clusters closely aligned with its historical zones of attestation, particularly in Trentino-Alto Adige and parts of Piedmont. These continuities reflect not only lineal survivals of early surname holders into the present era but also the residual prestige and administrative inertia of Latinized surnames in historically hybridized regions, where bureaucratic naming conventions endured beyond the decline of Latin in official functions.

Recent demographic data compiled from surname distribution databases such as the Anagrafe Nazionale della Popolazione Residente (the Italian civil registry) confirm that the majority of Belletto surname holders reside in Northern Italy, especially the provinces of Valle d'Aosta, Trento, and Piedmont. Municipal and diocesan archives in cities such as Aosta, Giaglioni, Rovereto, Bassano del Grappa, and Padua continue to record lineages bearing the surname into the present day, with entries in parish registries, tax assessments, and civil birth and marriage records confirming multigenerational continuity.

==== Transnational diaspora ====
The 19th and early 20th centuries witnessed significant emigration from Northern Italy, primarily due to agrarian recession, political instability, and industrialization delays following Italian unification in 1870 and the subsequent decline of the Austro-Hungarian Empire. Families bearing the surname Belletto appear in transatlantic immigration logs, including records maintained by port authorities on Ellis Island and Buenos Aires, where individuals from Trentino, Veneto, and Piedmont are listed between 1890 and 1935.

In the United States, the Belletto surname is attested in states such as New York, Illinois, California, Texas, and Louisiana. Several families established permanent residence and naturalized during the early 20th century—especially in the period between the two World Wars. As of 2014, an estimated 183 individuals in the United States bore the surname Belletto. The surname is most heavily concentrated in California, which accounts for approximately 58% of known U.S. occurrences, followed by Louisiana (9%), Texas (6%), and New York (<1%).

In South America, the surname Belletto appears in Argentina and Brazil, especially within immigrant enclaves in Buenos Aires, São Paulo, and Porto Alegre.

Smaller presences also appear in France, Belgium, Switzerland, Australia, and Canada, typically associated with either post-WWII economic migration or earlier Habsburg-era mercantile and clerical networks.

==== Contemporary demographics ====
Today, the Belletto surname remains statistically rare, with global estimates indicating fewer than 400 bearers, and only limited representation within Italy and elsewhere in Europe. Italian directories and international surname indexes consistently situate the name within the historic Alpine-Adriatic corridor.

== People with the surname ==
Notable people with the surname include:

- Al Belletto (1928–2014), American jazz musician
- René Belletto (born 1945), French novelist

== See also ==
- Belletti
