= São Paulo Madrid =

Spanish football club

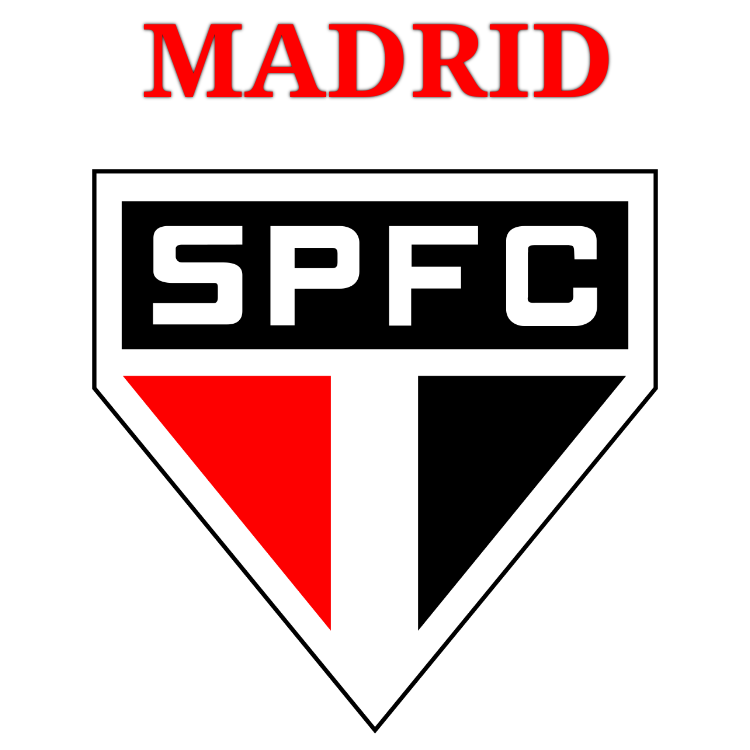
- Full name: São Paulo Madrid
- Founded: 1993
- Dissolved: 2008
- 2007–08: Tercera Regional – Group 3, 13th of 16
Home colours	Away colours

São Paulo Madrid was a professional football club from Madrid, Spain. The club was founded as Santangelo C.A., but due to a partnership with São Paulo of Brazil, on March 8, 2003, the club played their first game with the Brazilian football club jerseys against U.D. Hortaleza at El Pardo. The match ended in a 3-1 victory to the opposition. By then, Santangelo had 10 years and 2 titles under their belt. On July 1, 2003, the club was officially renamed to its current name, São Paulo Madrid. The club folded on June 30, 2008.

== Season to season ==
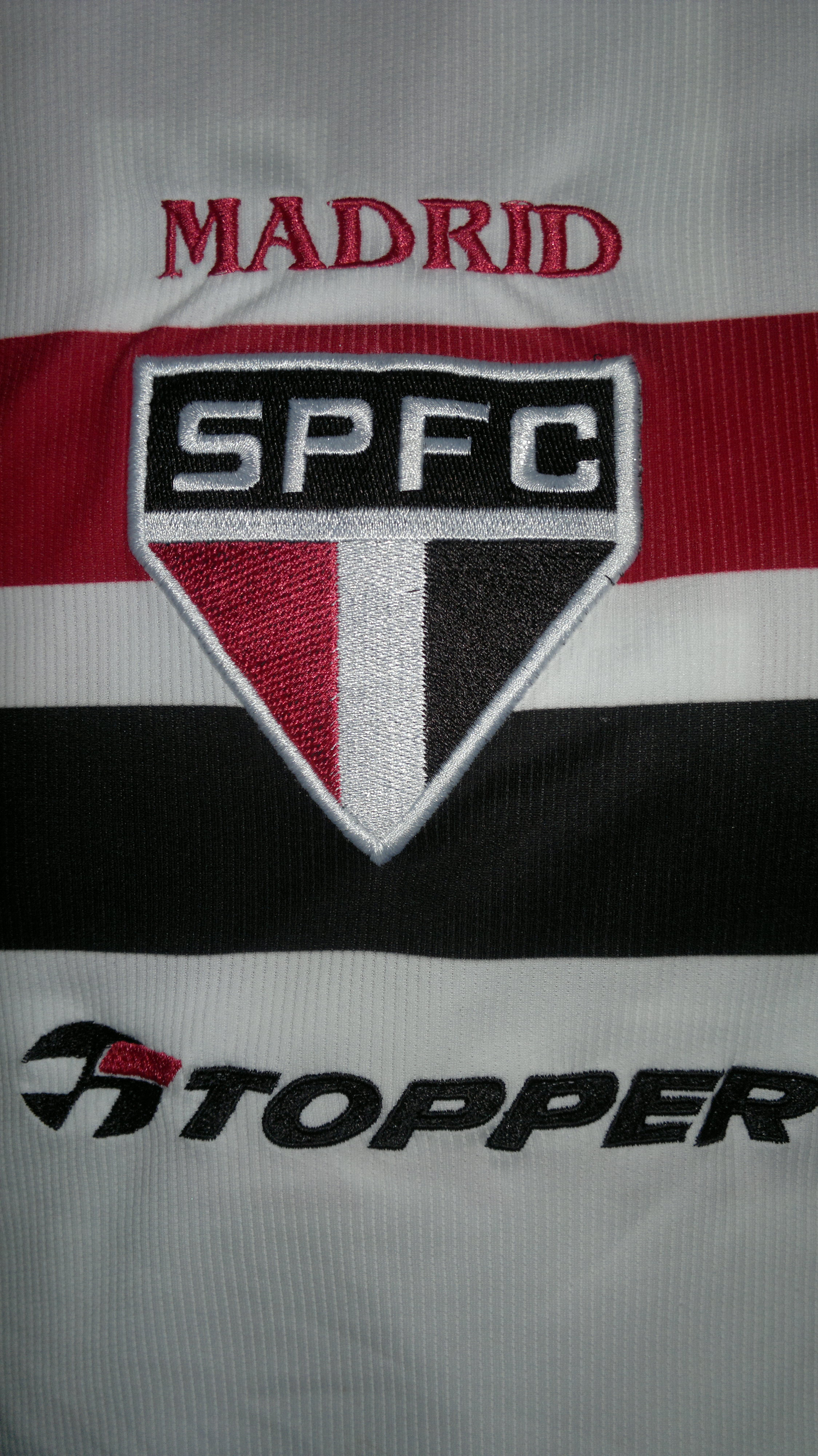
São Paulo Madrid uniform

Season	Tier	Division	Place	Copa del Rey
2004–05	8	3ª Reg.	9th	
2005–06	8	3ª Reg.	13th	
2006–07	8	3ª Reg.	5th	
2007–08	8	3ª Reg.	13th	

- 13 seasons in Tercera División
