= Noronha (footballer, born 1918) =

Brazilian footballer (1918–2003)

Personal information
- Full name: Alfredo Eduardo Barreto de Freitas Noronha
- Date of birth: 25 September 1918
- Place of birth: Porto Alegre, Brazil
- Date of death: 27 July 2003 (aged 84)
- Place of death: São Paulo, Brazil
- Position: Left back

Senior career*
Years	Team	Apps	(Gls)
1935–1941	Grêmio		
1942	Vasco		
1942–1951	São Paulo		
1951–1953	Portuguesa		
1954	Grêmio		
1954–1955	Ypiranga-SP		

International career
1944–1950	Brazil	16	(0)
Medal record
Men's Football
Representing Brazil
FIFA World Cup
Runner-up	1950 Brazil
Copa América
Winner	1949 Brazil
- * Club domestic league appearances and goals

Alfredo Eduardo Barreto de Freitas Noronha, better known as Noronha (25 September 1918 – 27 July 2003), was a Brazilian football player. He played for the Brazil national team in the 1950 FIFA World Cup.

== Honours ==
Grêmio

- Campeonato Gaúcho: 1935, 1937, 1938, 1939

São Paulo

- Campeonato Paulista: 1943, 1945, 1946, 1948, 1949

Portuguesa

- Torneio Rio–São Paulo: 1952

Brazil

- Copa América: 1949
- FIFA World Cup runner-up: 1950
