= Sandoval (footballer, born 1969) =

Brazilian footballer

Personal information
- Full name: Sandoval Luiz de Oliveira
- Date of birth: 19 October 1969 (age 57)
- Place of birth: Porto da Folha, Brazil
- Position: Attacking midfielder

Youth career
- 1988–1990: Sergipe

Senior career*
Years	Team	Apps	(Gls)
1990–1993	Sergipe		
1994–1995	Rio Branco-SP		
1994	→ Guarani (loan)		
1995	→ Goiás (loan)		
1996–1998	São Paulo	40	(8)
1997	→ Internacional (loan)		
1998	Coritiba		
1999	Atlético Paranaense		
2000	Guarani		
2000–2001	Vitória		
2002	América-SP		
2003	Santo André		
2005	Guarany-SE		
- * Club domestic league appearances and goals as of 10 September 2023

Sandoval Luiz de Oliveira (born 19 October 1969), simply known as Sandoval, is a Brazilian former professional footballer who played as an attacking midfielder.

== Career ==
Sandoval started his career at CS Sergipe, where he was three-time state champion. He then played for several clubs, most notably São Paulo FC.

== Honours ==
Sergipe

- Campeonato Sergipano: 1991, 1992, 1993

São Paulo

- Copa Masters CONMEBOL: 1996
- Copa dos Campeões Mundiais: 1996

Internacional

- Campeonato Gaúcho: 1997
