= Alcir (footballer) =

Brazilian footballer

Personal information
- Full name: Alcir de Oliveira Fonseca
- Date of birth: 14 November 1977 (age 48)
- Place of birth: São Pedro da Aldeia, Brazil
- Height: 1.72 m (5 ft 8 in)
- Position: Right back

Youth career
- Atlético Mineiro

Senior career*
Years	Team	Apps	(Gls)
1995–1999	Atlético Mineiro	63	(3)
1996	→ Flamengo (loan)	27	(0)
1999	→ Juventude (loan)		
2000–2001	Maia		
2001	Mogi Mirim		
2001	Mamoré		
2002	Seongnam Ilhwa Chunma		
2003	Rio Branco-SP		
2004	Paraná		
2005	América Mineiro		
2007	União Luziense		
2008	Araxá		
2009	Ideal de Ipatinga		
2010–2011	Betim		

International career
1995	Brazil U20		
- * Club domestic league appearances and goals as of 27 May 2024

Alcir de Oliveira Fonseca (born 14 November 1977), simply known as Alcir, is a Brazilian former professional footballer who played as a right back.

== Career ==
Right back, Alcir was revealed by the youth sectors of Atlético Mineiro. For the club, he played 63 matches and was part of the CONMEBOL Cup and state champion squads. He was loaned to Flamengo in 1996, playing 27 matches, and winning the state championship and the Copa Oro Nicolás Leoz. In 1999, on loan to Juventude, he was part of the Copa do Brasil winning squad. He later played for F.C Maia, Mogi Mirim, Mamoré and Seongnan, where he was K-League champion in 2002. He spent time at Paraná Clube and played the last part of his career for teams in the interior of Minas Gerais.

In 1995, he was part of the South American champion squad and runner-up in the World Championship for the Brazil under-20 team.

== Honours ==
Atlético Mineiro

- Copa CONMEBOL: 1997
- Campeonato Mineiro: 1995

Flamengo

- Campeonato Carioca: 1996
- Taça Guanabara: 1996
- Taça Rio: 1996
- Copa de Oro: 1996

Juventude

- Copa do Brasil: 1999

Seongnam

- K League 1: 2002

América Mineiro

- Taça Minas Gerais: 2005

Brazil U20

- South American U-20 Championship: 1995
