= Paolo Belletti =

17th-century Italian scientific instrument maker

Paolo Belletti (17th century) was an Italian scientific instrument maker.

Belletti was a Bolognese optician active in the second half of the seventeenth century. Only two of his telescopes are known to survive. They are signed and dated 1682 and 1689 respectively. The latter is now exhibited in Room IX of the Museo Galileo of Florence.
