= Copa Master de CONMEBOL =

Tournament details
- Host country: Brazil
- City: Cuiabá
- Dates: February 8 - February 12
- Teams: 4 (from 1 confederation)
- Venue: 1 (in 1 host city)

Final positions
- Champions: (Brazil) São Paulo (1st title)
- Runners-up: (Brazil) Atlético Mineiro

Tournament statistics
- Matches played: 3
- Goals scored: 13 (4.33 per match)
- Top scorer: (Brazil) Almir (5 goals)

The Copa Master de CONMEBOL (English: CONMEBOL Masters Cup, Portuguese: Copa Master da Conmebol or Supercopa Conmebol) was a football club competition contested by the four past winners of the Copa CONMEBOL at the time. The cup is one of the many inter-South American club competitions that have been organized by CONMEBOL.

The competition took place from February 8 to February 12, 1996, and it was contested in the city of Cuiabá with the participations of Atlético Mineiro, Botafogo, São Paulo, and Rosario Central. São Paulo won the competition after defeating Atlético Mineiro in the final 3-0.

== Eligible teams ==
Only four editions of the Copa CONMEBOL had been played by early 1996 and all four champions participated.

(Brazil) Atlético Mineiro	1992 Copa CONMEBOL winner
(Brazil) Botafogo	1993 Copa CONMEBOL winner
(Brazil) São Paulo	1994 Copa CONMEBOL winner
(Argentina) Rosario Central	1995 Copa CONMEBOL winner

== Tournament overview ==
Semi-finals
8 February – Cuiabá
(Brazil) São Paulo	7
(Brazil) Botafogo	3
9 February - Cuiabá
(Brazil) Atlético Mineiro (pen)	0 (10)
(Argentina) Rosario Central	0 (9)

Final
12 February – Cuiabá
(Brazil) São Paulo	3
(Brazil) Atlético Mineiro	0

=== Semifinals ===
8 February 1996

São Paulo (Brazil)	7–3	(Brazil) Botafogo
Valdir Bigode 6', 38'; Almir 12', 31', 55'; Ailton 72'; Edmílson 73'		Túlio 33', 48' (pen.), 52' (pen.)

Verdão, Cuiabá

9 February 1996

Atlético Mineiro (Brazil)	0–0	(Argentina) Rosario Central
	Report
Penalties
	10–9

Verdão, Cuiabá

=== Final ===
12 February 1996

São Paulo (Brazil)	3–0	(Brazil) Atlético Mineiro
Almir 9', 51'; Valdir Bigode 68'

Verdão, Cuiabá
Referee: Sidrack Marinho

Team details

São Paulo
At. Mineiro

GK	1	Zetti (c)
DF	2	Edinho
DF	3	Pedro Luís
DF	4	Sorlei	(substituted off) a'
DF	6	Guilherme
MF	8	Edmílson	(substituted off) b'
MF	5	Donizete
MF	10	Aílton	(substituted off) c'
MF	11	Sandoval
FW	7	Almir
FW	9	Valdir
Substitutes:
DF		Marquinhos	(substituted on) a'
DF		Gilmar	(substituted on) b'
MF		Denílson	(substituted on) c'
Manager:
(Brazil) Muricy Ramalho

GK	1	Cláudio Taffarel (c)
DF	2	Dinho
DF	3	Ronaldo Guiaro
DF	4	Ademir
DF	6	Edgar
MF	5	Doriva
MF	8	Gutemberg	(substituted on) a'
FW	10	Cairo Lima	(substituted on) b'
MF	11	Leandro Tavares	(substituted on) c'
MF	7	Ermani
FW	9	Renaldo
Substitutes:
FW		Elpídio Silva	(substituted on) a'
DF		Paulão	(substituted on) b'
MF		Clayton	(substituted on) c'
Manager:
(Brazil) Procópio Cardoso

== Scorers ==
5 goals

- (Brazil) Almir

3 goals

- (Brazil) Túlio
- (Brazil) Valdir Bigode

1 goal

- (Brazil) Edmílson
- (Brazil) Ailton
