= Giulio Belletti =

Italian volleyball player (born 1957)

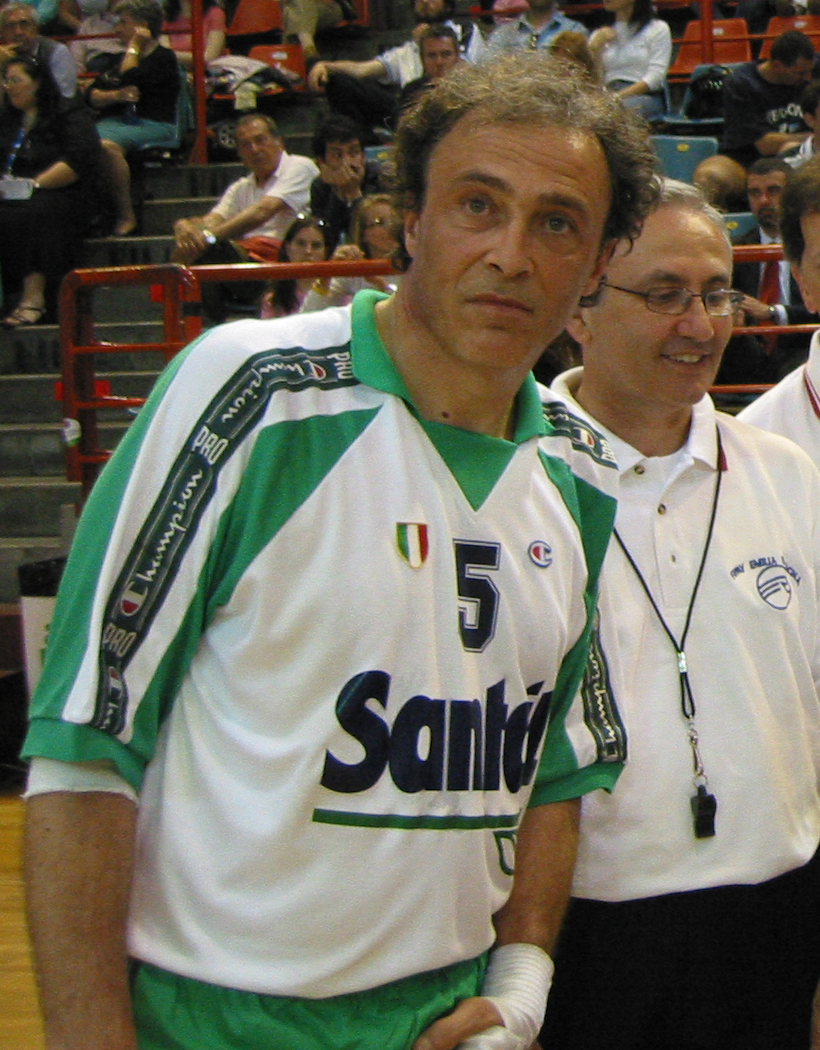
- Belletti at 2005 Maxitàl friendly match

Personal information
- Nationality: Italian
- Born: 23 May 1957 (age 67); Parma, Italy

Sport
- Sport: Volleyball

Giulio Belletti (born 23 May 1957) is an Italian volleyball player. He competed in the men's tournament at the 1980 Summer Olympics.
