= Pedro Luís (footballer, born 1970) =

Brazilian footballer

Personal information
- Full name: Pedro Luís Vitorino
- Date of birth: 14 June 1970 (age 56)
- Place of birth: Marília, Brazil
- Position: Centre-back

Youth career
- –1988: Ponte Preta

Senior career*
Years	Team	Apps	(Gls)
1988–1995	Ponte Preta		
1992	→ Criciúma (loan)		
1993	→ Rio Branco-MG (loan)		
1995–1997	São Paulo		
1997–1998	Araçatuba		
1998	Bragantino		
1998	Paraná		
2000	Mogi Mirim		
- * Club domestic league appearances and goals as of 14 October 2023

Pedro Luís Vitorino (born 14 June 1970), simply known as Pedro Luís, is a Brazilian former professional footballer who played as a centre-back.

== Career ==
Central defender who played for many years at AA Ponte Preta, had a brief spell at São Paulo FC but was unable to demonstrate a good performance. He played for other clubs until retiring in 2000. He currently has a football school in Campinas.

== Honours ==
São Paulo

- Copa Masters CONMEBOL: 1996
- Copa dos Campeões Mundiais: 1996
