= Márcio Costa =

Brazilian footballer (born 1971)

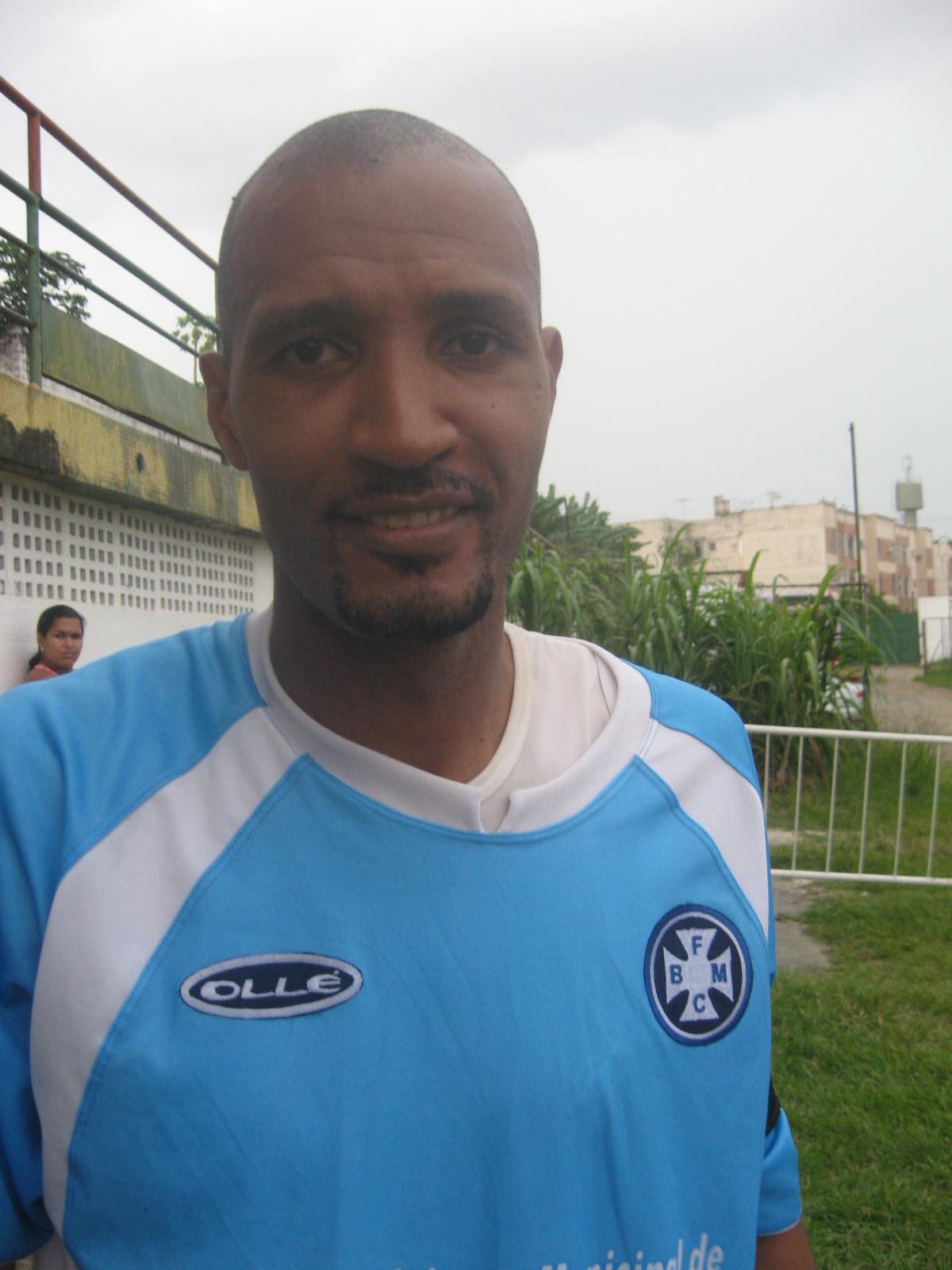

Personal information
- Full name: Márcio Alexandre Bastos da Costa
- Date of birth: 18 May 1971 (age 55)
- Place of birth: Rio de Janeiro, Brazil
- Height: 1.89 m (6 ft 2 in)
- Positions: Defender; defensive midfielder

Youth career
- –1989: São Cristóvão
- 1990–1991: Bragantino

Senior career*
Years	Team	Apps	(Gls)
1992–1993	Bragantino		
1994–1997	Fluminense	98	(1)
1995–1997	→ Flamengo (loan)	104	(1)
1998–2001	Corinthians	85	(4)
2001	Brasiliense		
2001	Santa Cruz		
2002	Coritiba		
2003	Cabofriense		
2004	Olaria		
2005	Sampaio Corrêa		
2006	Campinense		
2006–2007	Resende		
2008	São Cristóvão		
2008–2010	Resende		
2009	→ São Cristóvão (loan)		
2010	Volta Redonda		
2010–2011	Barra Mansa		
2011–2013	Capital-DF		
2012	→ Aracruz (loan)		
2014	Legião		
2015	Coríntians de Caicó		
2016	Ceilandense		
2017	Bolamense		
2017	CFZ-DF		
2019	Santa Maria-DF		
- * Club domestic league appearances and goals as of 17 October 2024

Márcio Alexandre Bastos da Costa (born 18 May 1971), simply known as Márcio Costa, is a Brazilian former professional footballer who played as a defender.

== Career ==
Revealed by the youth sectors of São Cristóvão FR, Márcio Costa began his career at Bragantino. He then played for Fluminense, where he was state champion and made 98 appearances, and for Flamengo, where he was again state champion and the Copa Oro in 1996. He played 104 matches for the club, scoring one goal.

In 1997 he joined Corinthians, a team where he was a substitute most of the time, but participated in historic achievements such as the Brazilian two-time championship and the FIFA Club World Championship in 2000. He made 85 appearances and scored 4 goals for the club.

From 2001 onwards Márcio Costa played for countless Brazilian football clubs, but without making history in any of his spells. He was champion of the second tier of Rio de Janeiro in 2007 with Resende FC, and was promoted to the first division with Barra Mansa FC years later. In 2015 he played for another "Corinthians", Corinthians de Caicó do Rio Grande do Norte. At 41 years old, he attributes the longevity of his career to the fact that he has never been injured.

Costa spent the last years of his career playing in Federal District football, being champion of the local second division with Bolamense in 2017. His last club was Santa Maria in 2019.

== Honours ==
Fluminense

- Campeonato Carioca: 1995
- Maceió Tournament: 1994

Flamengo

- Campeonato Carioca: 1996
- Taça Guanabara: 1996
- Taça Rio: 1996
- Copa de Oro: 1996

Corinthians

- FIFA Club World Cup: 2000
- Campeonato Brasileiro: 1998, 1999
- Campeonato Paulista: 1999, 2001

Resende

- Campeonato Carioca Série A2: 2007

Bolamense

- Campeonato Brasiliense Second Division: 2017
