= 1946 Campeonato Paulista =

Campeonato Paulista
- Season: 1946
- Champions: São Paulo
- Matches played: 110
- Goals scored: 444 (4.04 per match)
- Top goalscorer: Servílio (Corinthians) – 19 goals
- Biggest home win: São Paulo 7-0 Juventus (October 26, 1946)
- Biggest away win: Juventus 1-6 Portuguesa Santista (October 12, 1946)
- Highest scoring: Corinthians 8-3 Jabaquara (September 14, 1946)

The 1946 Campeonato Paulista da Primeira Divisão, organized by the Federação Paulista de Futebol, was the 45th season of São Paulo's top professional football league. São Paulo won the title for the 4th time. No teams were relegated. The top scorer was Corinthians's Servílio de Jesus with 19 goals.

== Championship ==
The championship was disputed in a double-round robin system, with the team with the most points winning the title.

Pos	Team	Pld	W	D	L	GF	GA	GD	Pts	Qualification or relegation
1	São Paulo	20	17	3	0	62	20	+42	37	Champions
2	Corinthians	20	18	0	2	62	29	+33	36	
3	Portuguesa	20	13	2	5	46	20	+26	28	
4	Santos	20	9	4	7	37	32	+5	22	
5	Palmeiras	20	8	4	8	37	31	+6	20	
6	Portuguesa Santista	20	7	3	10	41	51	−10	17	
7	Ypiranga	20	6	2	12	35	48	−13	14	
8	Comercial	20	4	6	10	38	55	−17	14	
9	São Paulo Railway	20	5	2	13	27	46	−19	12	
10	Juventus	20	4	3	13	32	60	−28	11	
11	Jabaquara	20	4	1	15	27	52	−25	9	

Updated to match(es) played on November 10, 1946. Source: RSSSF.com
Rules for classification: 1) points; 2) goal difference; 3) wins; 4) head-to-head points.

== Top Scores ==
Rank	Player	Club	Goals
1	Servílio	Corinthians	19
2	Teixeirinha	São Paulo	14
3	Leônidas	São Paulo	12
3	Nininho	Portuguesa	12
5	Cláudio	Corinthians	11
5	Antoninho	Santos	11
5	Caxambu	Santos	11
5	Pinga	Portuguesa	11
10	Luisinho	São Paulo	10
10	Baltazar	Corinthians	10
