= Fábio Baiano =

Brazilian footballer (born 1975)

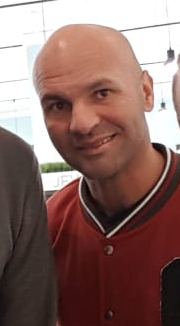
- Baiano in 2008

Personal information
- Full name: Fábio da Silva Morais
- Date of birth: 22 April 1975 (age 51)
- Place of birth: Feira de Santana, Brazil
- Height: 1.79 m (5 ft 10 in)
- Position: Attacking midfielder

Team information
- Current team: Brasiliense

Senior career*
Years	Team	Apps	(Gls)
1992–1996	Flamengo		
1996	Juventude		
1996–1998	Flamengo		
1998	Bahia		
1998–2000	Flamengo		
2000–2002	Grêmio		
2003–2004	Flamengo		
2004	São Caetano		
2004	Corinthians		
2005	Santos		
2005	Atlético Mineiro		
2006	Vasco da Gama		
2006	Ponte Preta		
2007	Paysandu		
2007	Juventude		
2008–	Brasiliense		
- * Club domestic league appearances and goals

Fábio da Silva Morais (born 22 April 1975), commonly known as Fábio Baiano, is a Brazilian footballer who plays as an attacking midfielder for Brasiliense.
