= São Paulo FC =

Brazilian professional football club

São Paulo
- Full name: São Paulo Futebol Clube
- Nicknames: Tricolor Paulista (Tricolour of São Paulo); O Clube da Fé (The Club of Faith); Soberano (The Sovereign); Campeão de Tudo (Champion of Everything)
- Founded: 25 January 1930; 96 years ago
- Stadium: MorumBIS
- Capacity: 72,039
- President: Harry Massis Jr.
- Head coach: Dorival Júnior
- League: Campeonato Brasileiro Série A Campeonato Paulista
- 2025 2025: Série A, 8th of 20; Paulista, 3rd of 16
- Website: saopaulofc.net
Home colours	Away colours	Third colours

São Paulo Futebol Clube (Brazilian Portuguese: [sɐ̃w ˈpawlu futʃiˈbɔw ˈklubi]) is a Brazilian professional football club based in the Morumbi district of São Paulo. It plays in Campeonato Paulista, the São Paulo's premier state league, and in the Campeonato Brasileiro Série A, the top tier of Brazilian football. Despite being primarily a football club, São Paulo competes in a wide variety of sports. Its home ground is the multipurpose 67,052-seater Estádio do Morumbi, the biggest private-owned field in Brazil. São Paulo is part of the Big Twelve of Brazilian football, South America's biggest worldwide champion — with three world titles, along Boca Juniors, Peñarol, and Nacional — and one of the only two clubs that have never been relegated from Brazil's top division, the other being Flamengo.

Founded in 1930 from a merger between the Club Athletico Paulistano and the Associação Atlética das Palmeiras, the club has used its traditional home kit of a white shirt with two horizontal stripes (one red and one black), white shorts, and white socks since its inception; the color choice was made in honour of its parent-clubs primary colors, and also to represent the colors of the state of São Paulo. Although its main affiliation is with the state and city where it was founded, São Paulo is a national team and the third best-supported club in Brazil, with over 22 million supporters, covering around 9.9% of its population. Their supporters are called são-paulinos and are often nicknamed Torcida que conduz (Supporters who lead), due to their importance in maintaining São Paulo's long lasting relevance in South America's football. São Paulo ranked fifth in Brazil with a market value of R$ 2.214 billion in 2023.

São Paulo is one of the most successful teams in Brazil with 44 official titles, that includes 23 state titles, 1 inter-state title, 6 Campeonato Brasileiro titles, 1 Copa do Brasil title, 1 Supercopa do Brasil title, 3 Copa Libertadores titles, 1 Copa Sudamericana, 1 Supercopa Libertadores, 1 Copa CONMEBOL, 1 Copa Masters CONMEBOL, 2 Recopa Sudamericanas, 2 Intercontinental Cup and 1 FIFA Club World Cup. It is the only club in the country to have won all available titles, earning the nickname "Champions of All", an honour achieved after winning the 2024 Supercopa do Brasil.

All five FIFA World Cups won by Brazil contained at least one São Paulo player, an honour shared with cross-city rivals Palmeiras.

== History ==
=== 1930–1934: Origins: "São Paulo da Floresta" ("São Paulo of the Forest") ===
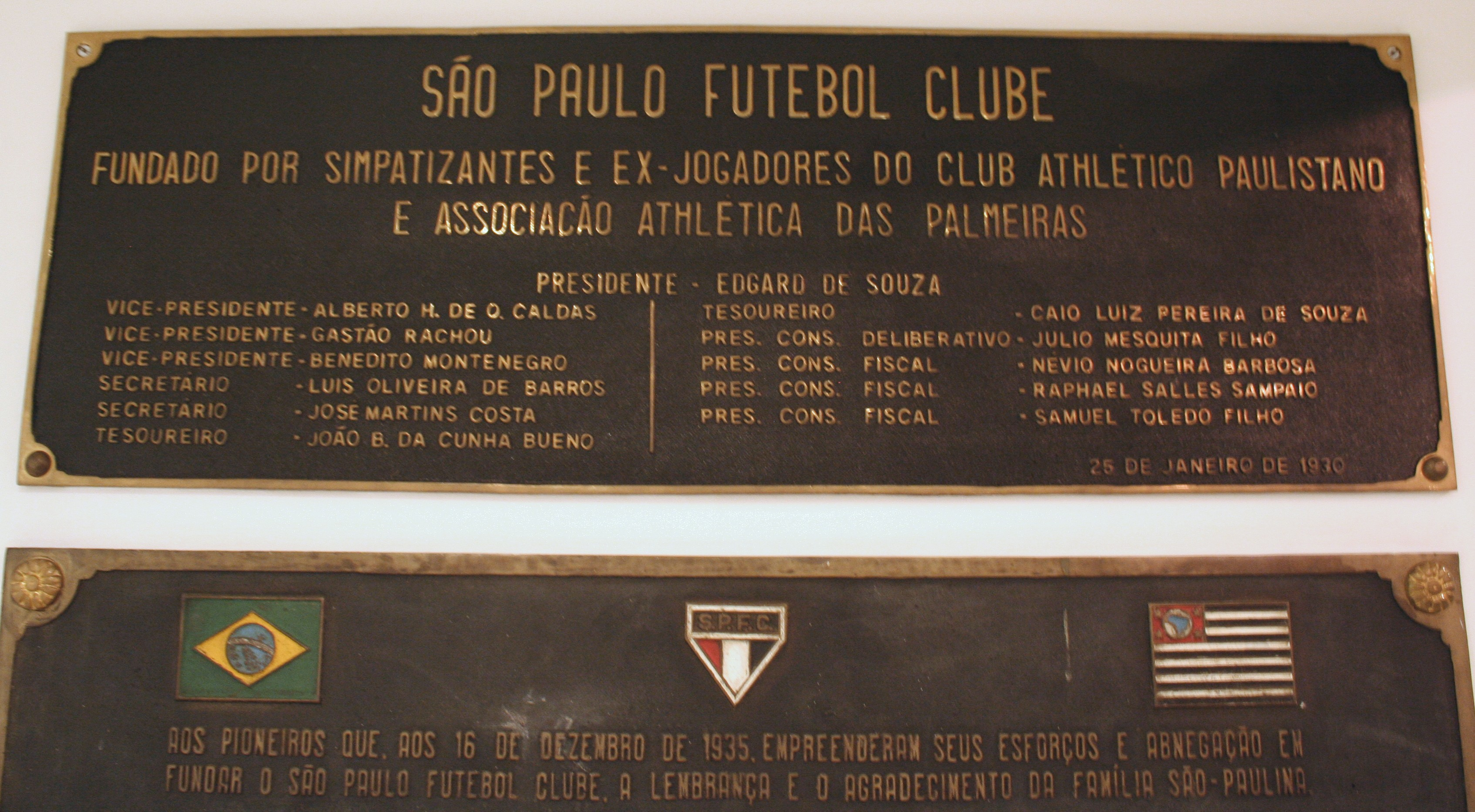
The foundations of the team in 1930 and 1935 at the memorial Cássio Luiz dos Santos Werneck.

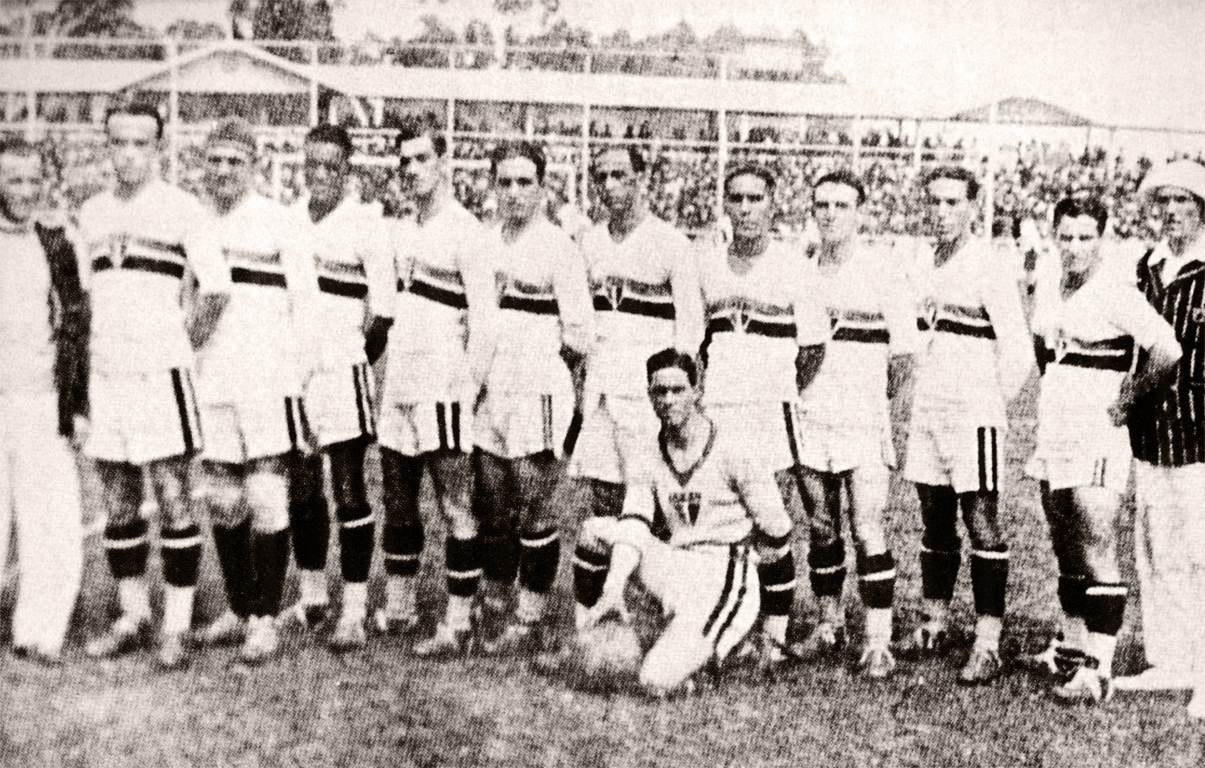
The championship team of 1931

São Paulo Futebol Clube was founded on 25 January 1930 by 60 former officials, players, members, and friends of the football clubs Club Athletico Paulistano and Associação Atlética das Palmeiras of São Paulo. Club Athletico Paulistano, founded in 1900 and one of the oldest clubs in town and 11-time champions of São Paulo, abandoned football due to the professionalization of the sport. Associação Atlética das Palmeiras, founded in 1902 and three-time champions of São Paulo, intended after the end of the season 1929 to set up a professional team, but failed to do so.

The jerseys of the new club were derived from Associação Atlética das Palmeiras, which were white and sported a black ring across the chest. To the black-and-white of Associação Atlética das Palmeiras was added the red-and-white of Club Athletico Paulistano, and the ring became red, white, and black.

The Club Athletico Paulistano brought to the union star players Arthur Friedenreich and Araken Patusca. Associação Atlética das Palmeiras' contribution was the stadium Estádio da Floresta, generally known as Chácara da Floresta. In August 1930, São Paulo played a match against the United States national team, which had competed in the Uruguay World Cup, at Chácara da Floresta wearing the uniform of AA das Palmeiras; São Paulo won its first international match 5-3.

Internal arguments and turmoil led to financial problems. The club merged with Clube de Regatas Tietê, another sports club from the town, and the football department was disbanded on 14 May 1935.

=== 1935–1939: The rebirth of São Paulo FC ===
Just after the merger with Tietê, the founders and re-founders created the Grêmio Tricolor, which formed Clube Atlético São Paulo on 4 June 1935, and, finally, São Paulo Futebol Clube on 16 December of the same year.

The new club's first game was against Portuguesa Santista on 25 January 1936. The match was almost cancelled, owing to the city's anniversary, but Porphyrio da Paz, the football director and composer of the club's anthem, obtained permission from the Board of Education Office for the game to continue.

Another merger occurred in 1938, this time with Clube Atlético Estudantes Paulista, from the neighborhood of Moóca, and the club finished as runners-up in the Campeonato Paulista.

=== 1940–1950: "The Steam Roller" ===
In 1940, when the Estádio do Pacaembu was inaugurated, a new era began in São Paulo state football. São Paulo Futebol Clube finished as runners-up once again in the Campeonato Paulista in 1941, and a year later the club paid 200 contos de réis (equivalent to approximately R$162,000 today) to acquire Leônidas from Flamengo. During this period, São Paulo also acquired the Argentinian António Sastre and Brazilians Noronha, José Carlos Bauer, Zezé Procópio, Luizinho, Rui and Teixeirinha. With these new additions, Tricolor became known as the Steam Roller, winning the Paulista championship five times, in 1943, 1945, 1946, 1948 and 1949. The club sold its Canindé training ground to Portuguesa to raise money for their new stadium, the Estádio do Morumbi, for which construction began in 1952.

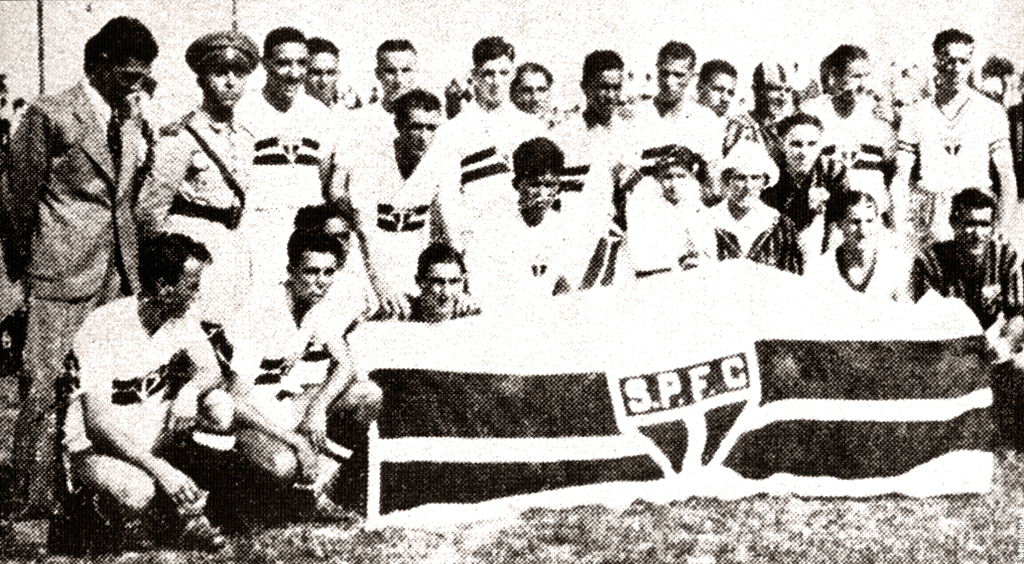
New team after being reformed in 1936

=== 1951–1957: The dry spell ===
The run of success of the 1940s, came to an end in the early 1950s, and the club only won two state championships in the new decade, in 1953 and 1957. The 1957 championship was won with the help of the 35-year-old Brazilian international Zizinho, and Hungarian manager Béla Guttmann, both of them becoming idols. Guttmann took charge of the team in 1957 and won the São Paulo State Championship that year. While in Brazil he helped popularise the 4–2–4 formation, which was subsequently used by Brazil as they won the 1958 FIFA World Cup.

In the years that followed, the club struggled to compete with the rise of Pelé and his club, Santos. With the construction of the Morumbi stadium still ongoing, São Paulo entered its longest period without a title in its history, which was to last 13 years.

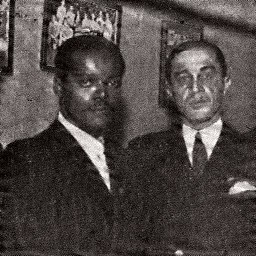
Leônidas with another Tricolor legend, Arthur Friedenreich

=== 1958–1969: Just the stadium ===
Since São Paulo's budget planning was focused on the Estádio do Morumbi construction rather than the signing of new players, few expensive players were bought during the 1960s, although the club did acquire Brazilian internationals Roberto Dias and Jurandir. In 1960, the Estádio do Morumbi was inaugurated, named after the late Cícero Pompeu de Toledo, the club's chairman during most of the stadium construction. One of the few happy moments for the fans during this period was the 1963 Paulista Championship 4–1 victory against Pelé's Santos.

=== 1970–1979: Campeonato Brasileiro (Brazilian Championship) ===
In 1970, the Estádio do Morumbi was finally completed and the club purchased Gérson from Botafogo, Uruguayan midfielder Pedro Rocha from Peñarol and striker Toninho Guerreiro from Santos. The club was managed by Zezé Moreira, who was the manager of Brazil at the World Cup in 1954, and won the Paulista Championship after beating Guarani 2–1 in the Campinas a week before the end of the competition.

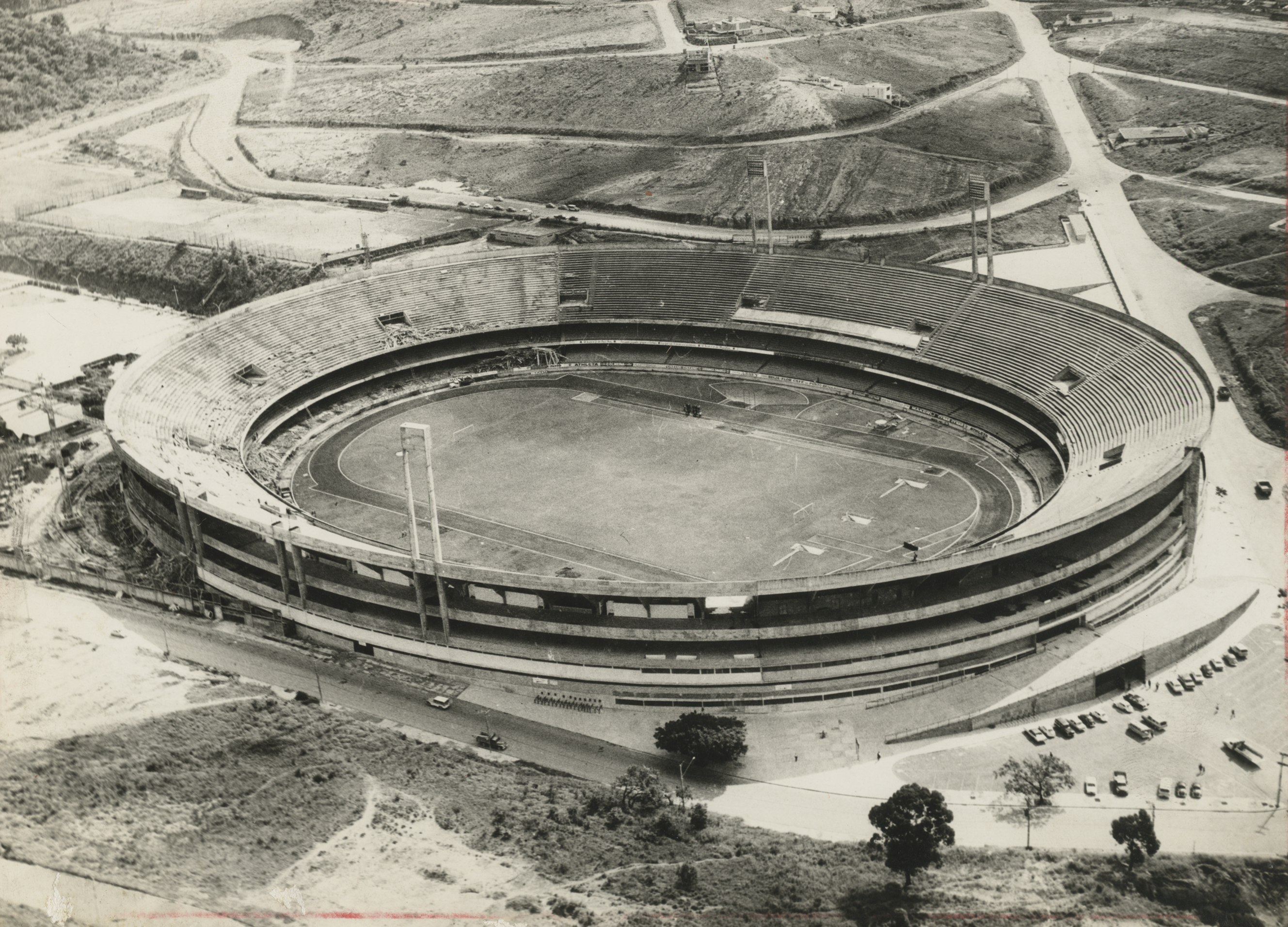
View of the Morumbi Stadium, 23 January 1970. National Archives of Brazil.

In 1971, the club beat Palmeiras 1–0 with a goal from Toninho Guerreiro in the final to capture another state title. That year saw the inaugural Campeonato Brasileiro, with the club finishing as runners-up to Atlético Mineiro, managed by Telê Santana.

In the following years, São Paulo and Palmeiras gradually overtook Pelé's Santos and Corinthians as the dominant club sides in São Paulo state. In 1972, Palmeiras won the state championship title, only one point ahead of São Paulo, and the following year the clubs finished in the same positions in the Brazilian Championship. In 1974, São Paulo took part in the Copa Libertadores losing in the final to Independiente in a replay.

In 1975, former goalkeeper José Poy took over as manager, and São Paulo won the Paulista Championship after defeating Portuguesa in a penalty shoot-out.

Valdir Peres, Chicão, Serginho Chulapa and Zé Sérgio were the club's most influential players when São Paulo finally secured the Brazilian Championship for the first time in 1977 following a penalty shoot-out victory over Atlético Mineiro at the Mineirão. However, they failed to win another trophy until the reclaimed the Paulista Championship in 1980.

=== The 1980s: Tricolor decade ===
In the 1980s, São Paulo won four Paulista and one Brazilian titles, helped by the impressive central defensive pair of Oscar and Dario Pereyra. 1980 and 1981, the club won the Paulista Championship in successive seasons for the first time since the 1940s.

In 1985, the head coach Cilinho introduced to the world the Menudos of Morumbi, a team that included Paulo Silas, Müller and Sidney, and the club once again won the Paulista Championship. The main striker was Careca, a centre-forward who also played for Brazil in the 1986 FIFA World Cup. The midfield featured Falcão, brought in from Italian club Roma and becoming a big part in winning the Campeonato Paulista in 1985. In 1986, manager Pepe led the club to its second Brazilian Championship title, defeating Guarani in a penalty shoot-out. In 1987, Dario Pereyra left the club, but in that year the Menudos team won its last title, another Paulista title. The so-called Tricolor Decade ended with the 1989 Paulista Championship title and a second-place finish in the Brazilian Championship, when São Paulo lost to Vasco da Gama in the final match.

=== 1990–1995: The Telê Era: Libertadores and Intercontinental Cups ===
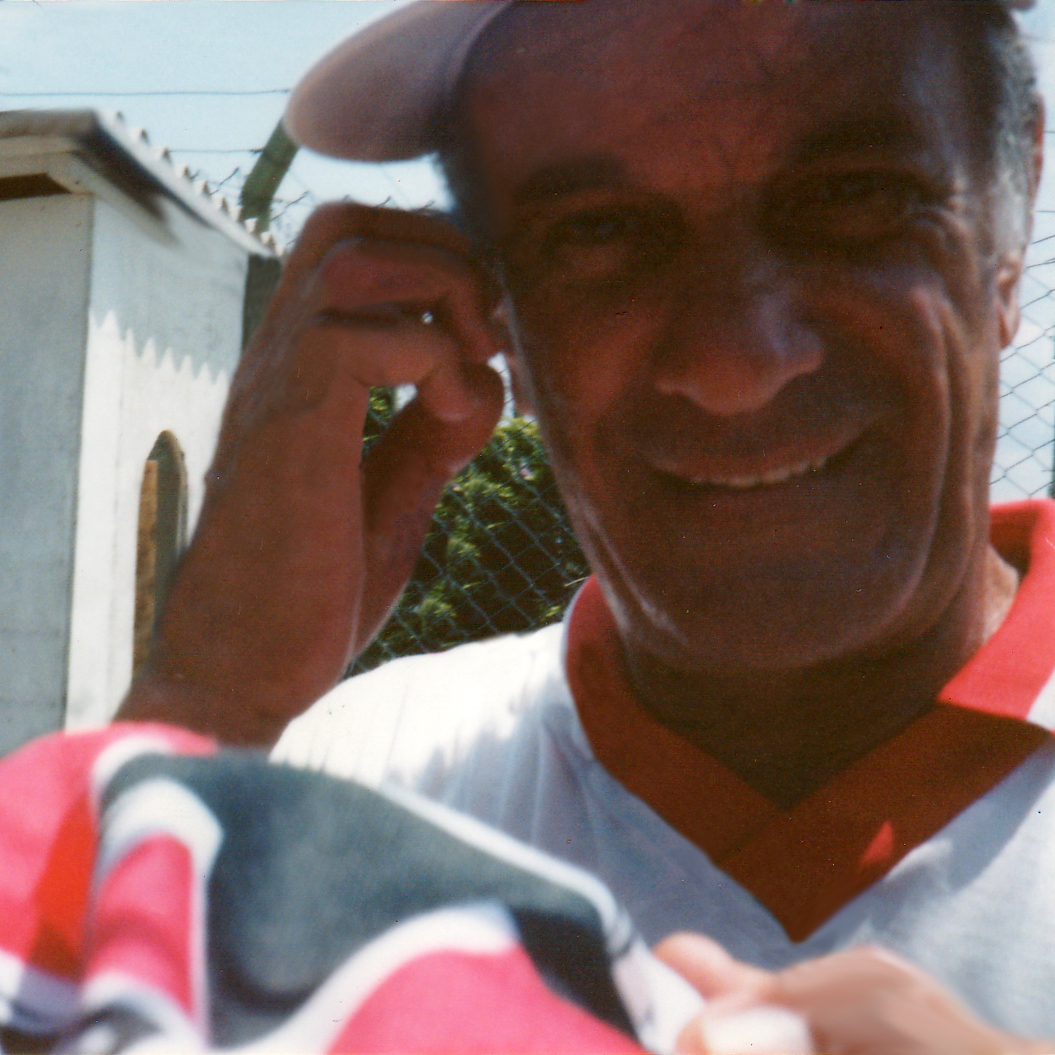
Telê Santana, won two Copa Libertadores and two Club World Cups with São Paulo.

In 1990, after a poor start to the campaign in the Paulista, Telê Santana was hired as the club's coach, and São Paulo went on to finish runners-up in the Brazilian Championship. In 1991, Santana won his first title after winning the Paulista championship.

In 1991, São Paulo won the Brazilian championship after beating Carlos Alberto Parreira's Bragantino, and the club began a period of consistent achievement both nationally and internationally. The following year they reached the Copa Libertadores final, where they faced Newell's Old Boys of Argentina. São Paulo lost the first leg 1–0, but reversed the scoreline in the second leg in Brazil, and then won the competition in the penalty shoot-out to take the title for the first time.

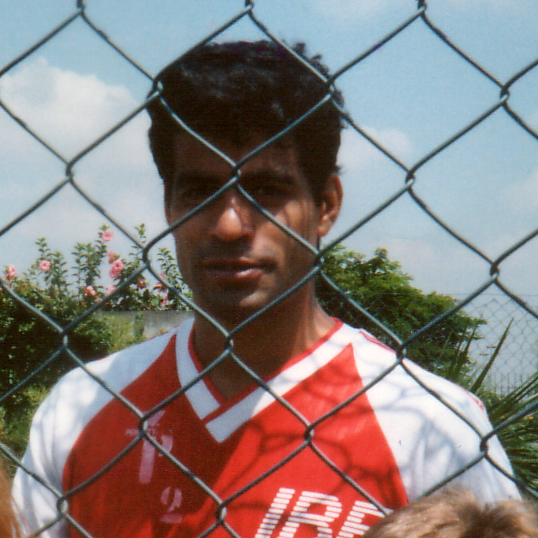
Raí, São Paulo's midfielder in the 1990s.

In the same year, in Tokyo the club won its first Intercontinental Cup, beating Johan Cruyff's Barcelona 2–1. After returning to Brazil, the club beat Palmeiras 2–1 to win its 18th state championship title.

In 1993, São Paulo retained the Copa Libertadores, beating Universidad Católica of Chile in the finals 5–3 on aggregate, including a 5–1 first leg win. After the competition, influential midfielder Raí left the club. The Copa Libertadores win allowed the club to play the Recopa Sudamericana that year, beating 1992 Supercopa Libertadores winners and fellow Brazilian side Cruzeiro. The club also won the 1993 Supercopa Libertadores, beating Flamengo on penalties in the final. The Supercopa Libertadores title meant the club has completed an unprecedented CONMEBOL treble (Copa Libertadores, Recopa Sudamericana, Supercopa Libertadores).

São Paulo was able to defend its Intercontinental Cup title again, beating Fabio Capello's Milan 3–2. Müller scored the winning goal in the 86th minute of the match, from an assist by Toninho Cerezo. This meant the club had completed a quadruple.

In 1994, the club reached the Copa Libertadores finals for the third year in a row, and faced Argentina's Vélez Sársfield. On this occasion they lost on penalties to the Argentine side at the Morumbi stadium. But by the end of this year, São Paulo won the Copa CONMEBOL, defeating Peñarol of Uruguay in the finals 6-4 on aggregate with a team known as "Expressinho", a team formed of youth and reserve players led by Muricy Ramalho.

=== 1996–2004: Post-Telê years ===
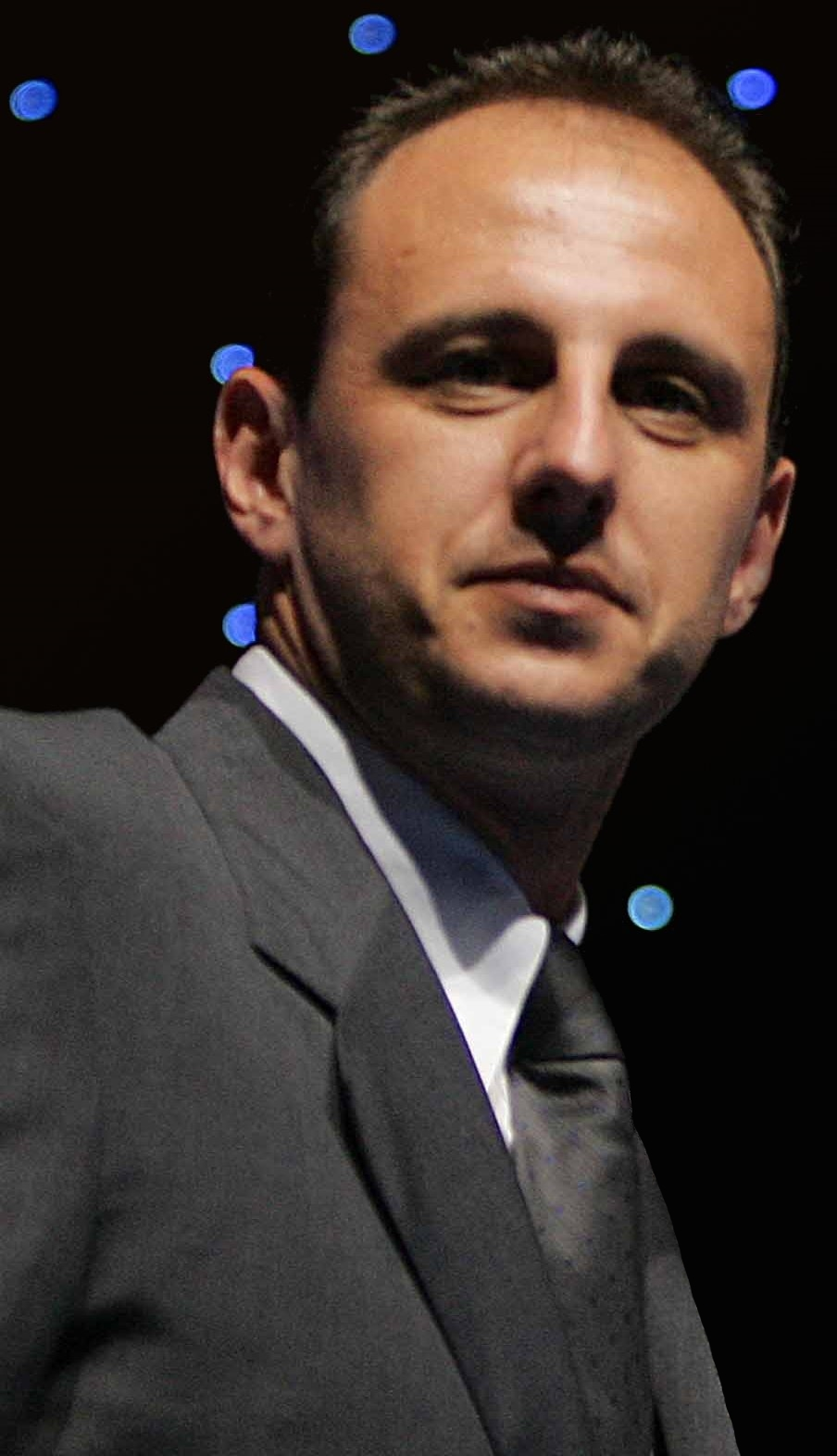
Rogério Ceni, São Paulo's former goalkeeper, he is the highest scoring goalkeeper of all time.

At the beginning of 1996, owing to health issues, Telê Santana left São Paulo, ending the club's golden era. Between 1995 and 2004, the club had fourteen managers. Among the most notable titles during those ten years were the 2000 Paulista Championship and the club's first Rio-São Paulo Tournament title in 2001. Rogério Ceni, Júlio Baptista, Luís Fabiano and Kaká were the club's stars. Raí briefly returned to the club between 1998 and 2000, and with him, the club won the Paulista Championship twice, in 1998 and 2000, after beating Corinthians and Santos, respectively. In 2004 São Paulo were back in the Copa Libertadores and reached the semi-finals before being eliminated by underdogs Once Caldas from Colombia. At the end of that year, Émerson Leão was hired as the club's coach.

In 2003, São Paulo made a deal with Spanish amateur side Santangelo Club Aficionado that resulted in the Spanish club changing its name to São Paulo Madrid.

=== 2005–2009: Three Brazilian Championships, Libertadores and FIFA Club World Cup ===
In 2005, with Leão as the club's manager, São Paulo won the Paulista Championship. Leão, however, would soon leave the club with Paulo Autuori, former manager of the Peru national team, hired to replace him. São Paulo won the Libertadores Cup for the third time, beating another Brazilian side, Atlético Paranaense, in the final. Atlético switched the first leg of the final to Estádio Beira-Rio, Porto Alegre, their own ground not having sufficient capacity for a final, and the match ended in a 1–1 draw. In the second leg, at the Morumbi, São Paulo won 4–0 to become the first Brazilian club to win three Copa Libertadores titles.

In December 2005, São Paulo competed in the FIFA Club World Championship in Japan. After beating Saudi Arabia's Al-Ittihad 3–2, they faced European champions Liverpool in the final. A 1–0 victory over the English team gave São Paulo its third intercontinental title. The single goal was scored by Mineiro in the first half of the match. Other players in that year's squad included centre-back Diego Lugano, full-back Cicinho, forward Amoroso, and the record-breaking goalkeeper Rogério Ceni, who was selected Man of the Match at the FIFA Club World Championship title match, as well as the tournament's MVP.

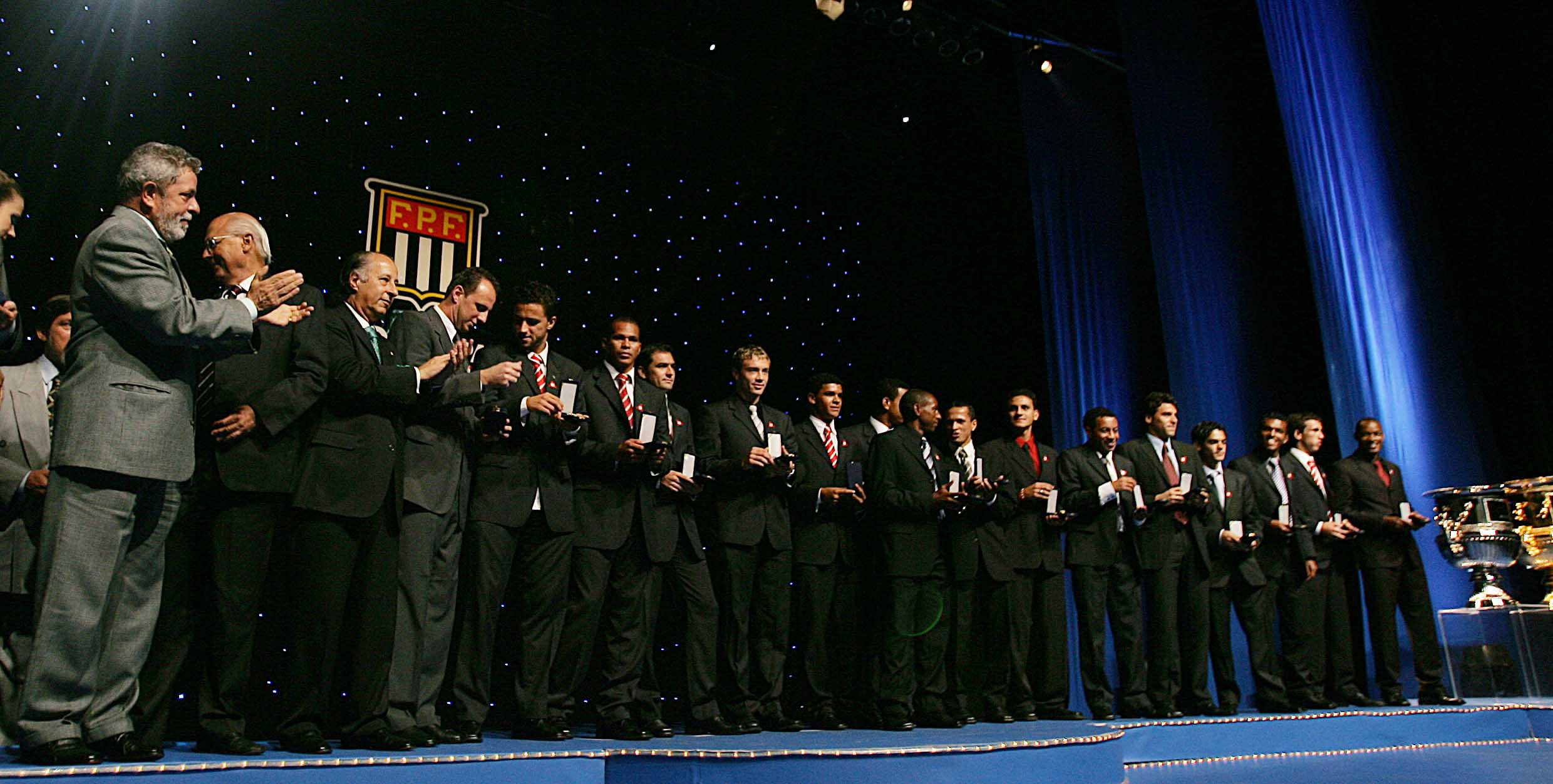
Tribute received from the Paulista Football Federation and President Lula for winning their first FIFA Club World Cup.

After the success of the 2005 season, Paulo Autuori left the team to coach Kashima Antlers in the J. League. Muricy Ramalho was signed up as the new coach, having led Internacional to the runners-up position in the 2005 Brazilian Championship. In his first tournament as a manager, Ramalho reached second place in the Paulista Championship, losing to Santos by one point. São Paulo reached the final of the 2006 Copa Libertadores, but lost 4–3 on aggregate to Brazilian rivals Internacional. However, they went on to win their fourth Campeonato Brasileiro trophy, becoming the first team to become national champions in the new league system format.

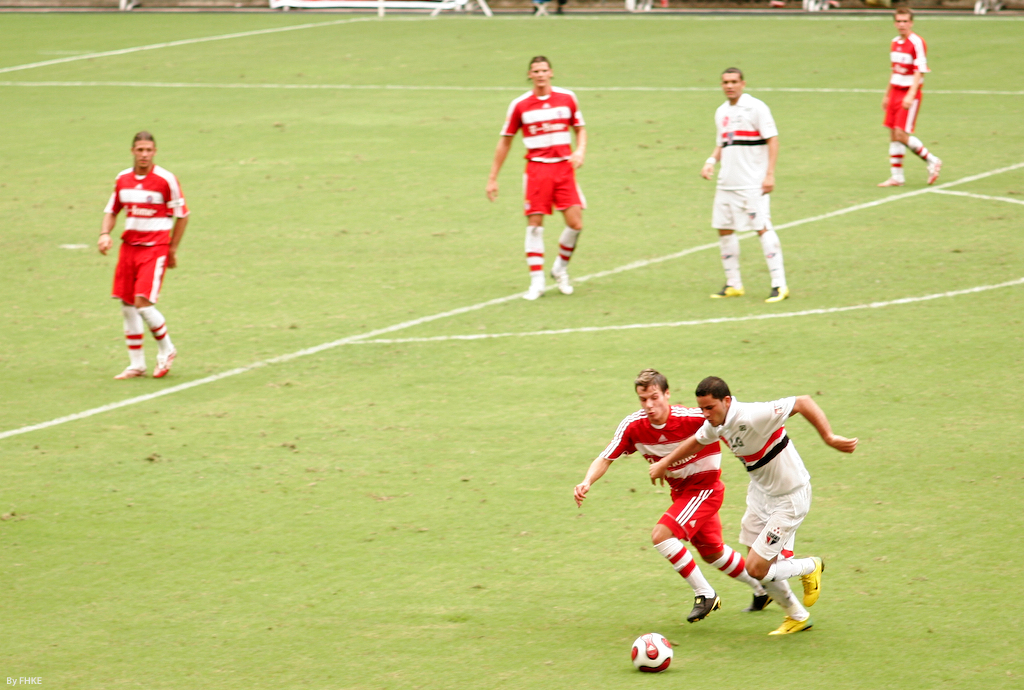
São Paulo against Bayern Munich in 2007.

After being eliminated from the Copa Libertadores round of 16 to Grêmio in 2007, São Paulo won the Brazilian title for the second year in a row, fifteen points ahead of second-placed Santos. They won the title for the third season running in 2008 season, overturning an 11-point deficit behind Grêmio in the second half, to win its sixth league title. Manager Muricy Ramalho was the first manager to win three league titles in a row with the same team.

Despite this feat, Muricy was sacked the following year after São Paulo was eliminated in the 2009 Copa Libertadores quarter-finals to Cruzeiro, its fourth consecutive elimination to a Brazilian side. Ricardo Gomes took over as manager. The club was very close to winning the league for the fourth time in a row, however, after struggling in the final 4 games, they ended up finishing in third.

=== 2010–2020: Copa Sudamericana and a tough period ===
In 2010 São Paulo lost once again to Internacional in the 2010 Copa Libertadores, this time in the semifinals, ending Ricardo Gomes' spell as manager. The club finished ninth in the league, not qualifying for the international competition for the first time since 2003.

In 2011, the club signed Rivaldo and brought back Luís Fabiano for a club-record €7.6 million from Sevilla. Goalkeeper Rogério Ceni, meanwhile, scored his 100th career goal, against Corinthians in the Campeonato Paulista. Despite these events, it was another very disappointing season, finishing sixth in the league and failing to qualify for the Libertadores once again.

In research conducted by Brazilian sports website GloboEsporte.com, São Paulo, during the eight years between 2003 and 2011, were just the second Brazilian club to earn more money than losses in the transfer market – Tricolor paulista received R$287 million, behind only Internacional, which earned R$289 million.

In 2012, São Paulo won the Copa Sudamericana (its only title in the 2010 decade) and qualified for next season's Libertadores, finishing fourth in the league under Ney Franco. However, after that season, the club hit a second massive dry spell and struggled to regain its dominance in the Brazilian and South American stage.

For the 2013 season, after seven years wearing kits produced by Reebok, São Paulo signed with Brazilian brand Penalty. The contract was valid until 2015 and the club earned R$35 million per year. This contract was the second-most lucrative kit deal in Brazil, just exceeded by Flamengo and Adidas' deal of R$38 million. In May 2015 São Paulo presented its new kits, made by Under Armour. In 2018 the team became sponsored by Adidas.

In 2014, 2018 and 2020 the club was one of the contenders for the national league title, but did not win it; São Paulo finished runners-up in 2014, fifth in 2018, and fourth in 2020, the last two being marked by massives drops of form in the second half. In contrast to this, they struggled hard in 2013 and 2017, fighting (and eventually saving themselves) against relegation to the second tier.

Continentally, in 2016 the club reached the semi-finals of the Copa Libertadores, losing to Atlético Nacional.

During the 2010s, São Paulo did not win a single Campeonato Paulista title, the first time since the 1960s.

=== 2021–present: Champions of Everything ===
In 2021, São Paulo finally ended its second biggest dry spell in its history (8 years); under new manager Hernán Crespo, the club defeated Palmeiras at the Campeonato Paulista finals, winning the competition for the first time since 2005. However, after a continuing sequence of poor results, which included quarter-final exits in the Copa Libertadores and in the Copa do Brasil to Palmeiras and Fortaleza, respectively, Crespo was sacked in October, with the club being involved in another relegation battle at the Campeonato Brasileiro, eventually finishing 13th, after Crespo was replaced by club legend Rogério Ceni in his second managerial spell.

In 2022, under Ceni, the club reached once again the Campeonato Paulista finals, reaching their third state finals in four years; a progress, since São Paulo didn't reach the state finals between 2007 (when the knock-out second phase was re-established) and 2018. São Paulo ended the competition as runners-up to Palmeiras; despite winning the first leg 3–1 at the Morumbi, they suffered a heavy 4–0 comeback defeat at Allianz Parque. Also in 2022, the club reached the semifinals of the 2022 Copa do Brasil, being eliminated by eventual winners Flamengo, and suffered another final defeat, this time in the Copa Sudamericana, losing to Ecuadorian side Independiente del Valle in Córdoba, Argentina. In the Campeonato Brasileiro, however, São Paulo finished in 9th place, one position outside Copa Libertadores qualification.

In 2023, just like six years before, Rogério Ceni was sacked and replaced by Dorival Júnior after getting eliminated in the quarter-final of the Campeonato Paulista to underdogs and eventual runners-up Água Santa. Under the guidance of Dorival, São Paulo won its first Copa do Brasil title in a memorable run, defeating along the way Ituano, Sport Recife and, most notably, city rivals Palmeiras and Corinthians and defending champions Flamengo in the finals, winning the first leg 1–0 in the Maracanã and drawing 1–1 at the second leg in the Morumbi. The club finished 11th in the Campeonato Brasileiro and reached the quarter-finals of the Copa Sudamericana, being eliminated by eventual champions L.D.U. Quito.

After a successful year, Dorival Júnior left São Paulo in January 2024 to manage the Brazil national team; it was the third time the club lost their manager to a national team in more than eight years (the others being Juan Carlos Osorio to Mexico in 2015 and in the following year, Edgardo Bauza to Argentina). Juventude manager Thiago Carpini was appointed as Dorival's replacement, guiding the club to the 2024 Supercopa Rei defeating Palmeiras on penalties at the Mineirão in Belo Horizonte. With the Supercopa Rei title, São Paulo became the only team in Brazil to win all the competitions that are held and still exist in the Brazilian football calendar, earning the nickname "Champions of Everything".

At the beginning of 2026, president Julio Casares was impeached and Harry Massis Júnior assumed in his place. The club had a revenue of R$ 1,07 billion reais in 2025; in the same year the debt was lowered to R$ 858,2 million reais. In May 2026 Dorival Júnior returned as manager, after the dismissal of Roger Machado. In September 2026, Julio Casares was expelled from São Paulo's membership rolls; the ex-president will have to pay compensation to the club.

== Colors and badge ==
Club Athletico Paulistano

Associação Atlética das Palmeiras

When the Club Athletico Paulistano and the Associação Atlética das Palmeiras merged, their colours (red and white for CA Paulistano and black and white for AA das Palmeiras) were inherited by São Paulo. The colours match those of São Paulo's state flag, and also represents the three main races that lived in Brazil during that period: the Native Brazilians (represented by the red), the White Brazilians (represented by the white) and the Afro-Brazilians (represented by the black).

The club's home kit is a white shirt, with two horizontal stripes at chest level, the upper one red and the lower one black, and the badge in the centre of the chest; the shorts and socks are white. The away kit consists of a shirt with red, white and black vertical stripes, black shorts and black socks.

The badge, representing a heart with five points, consists of a shield with a black rectangle in the upper section bearing the initials SPFC in white; below the rectangle there's a red, white and black triangle. It was designed by the german graphic designer Walter Ostrich and one of the founders, Firmiano de Morais Pinto Filho. The badge also has five stars, two gold and three red ones: the gold ones denote Adhemar Ferreira da Silva's World and Olympic records at the 1952 Summer Olympics in Helsinki and at the 1955 Pan American Games in Mexico City; the red ones represent each of the two Intercontinental Cups and the FIFA Club World Cup won by the club.

== Kit suppliers and shirt sponsors ==
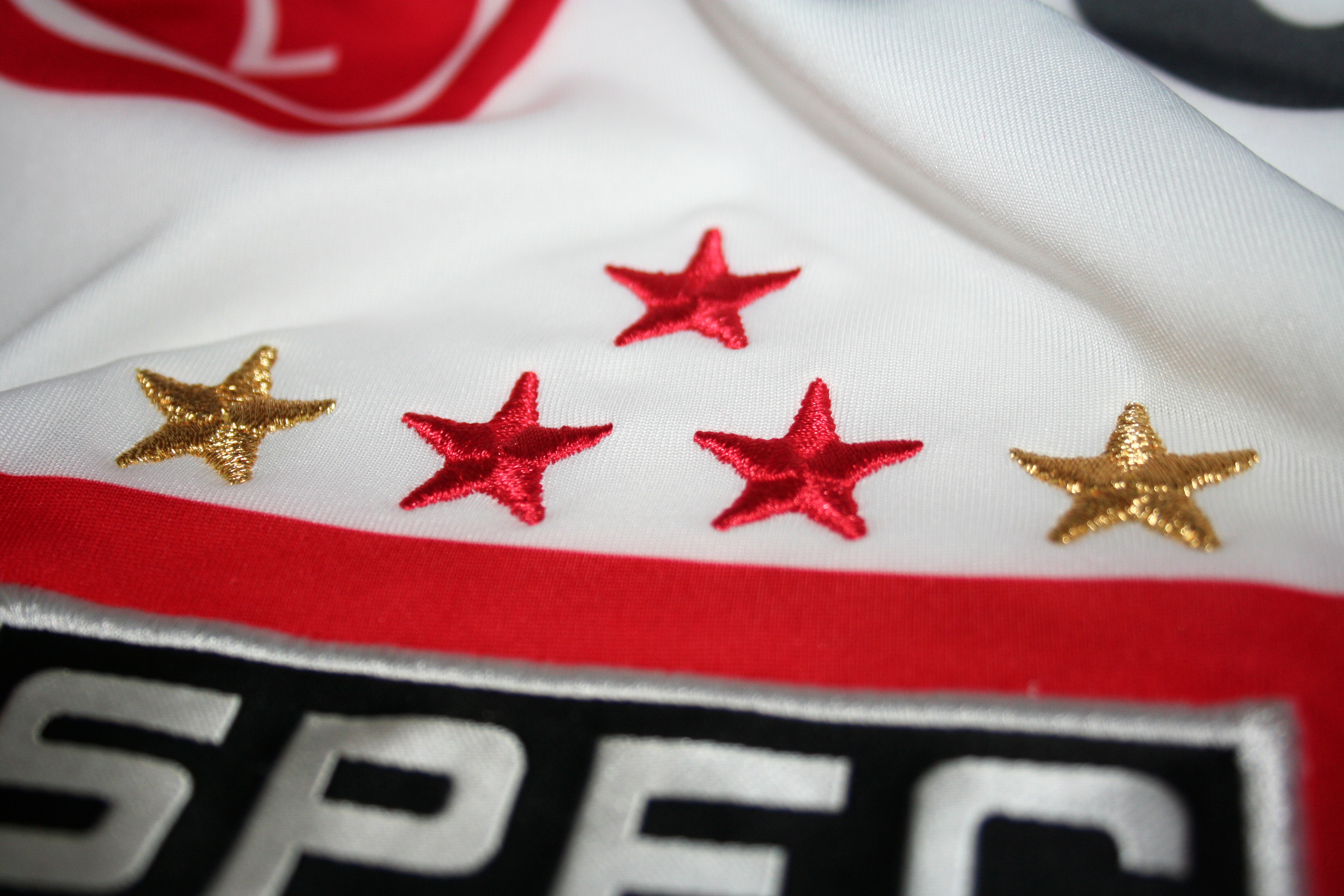
The traditional three stars in São Paulo’s crest, representing the three worldwide championships won by the club.

Although São Paulo's kit has been supplied by several different manufacturers, the club's traditional home and away kit suffered very few changes and variations throughout the years, making it one the most recognizable kits in Brazil.

The first sports equipment supplier in São Paulo's history was the brazilian company Athleta in 1960. From 1986 to 1990, 1996 to 1999 and 2018 to 2023 the club was sponsored by the german company Adidas. São Paulo was sponsored by american company Reebok from 2006 to 2012, when signed a contract with brazilian Penalty until 2015. American company Under Armour sponsored the club from 2015 to the end of 2017. From 2024 until 2032, the club has a contract with american sports equipment supplier New Balance.

Period	Kit manufacturer	Shirt sponsor
2024–32	New Balance	Superbet

== Stadium ==
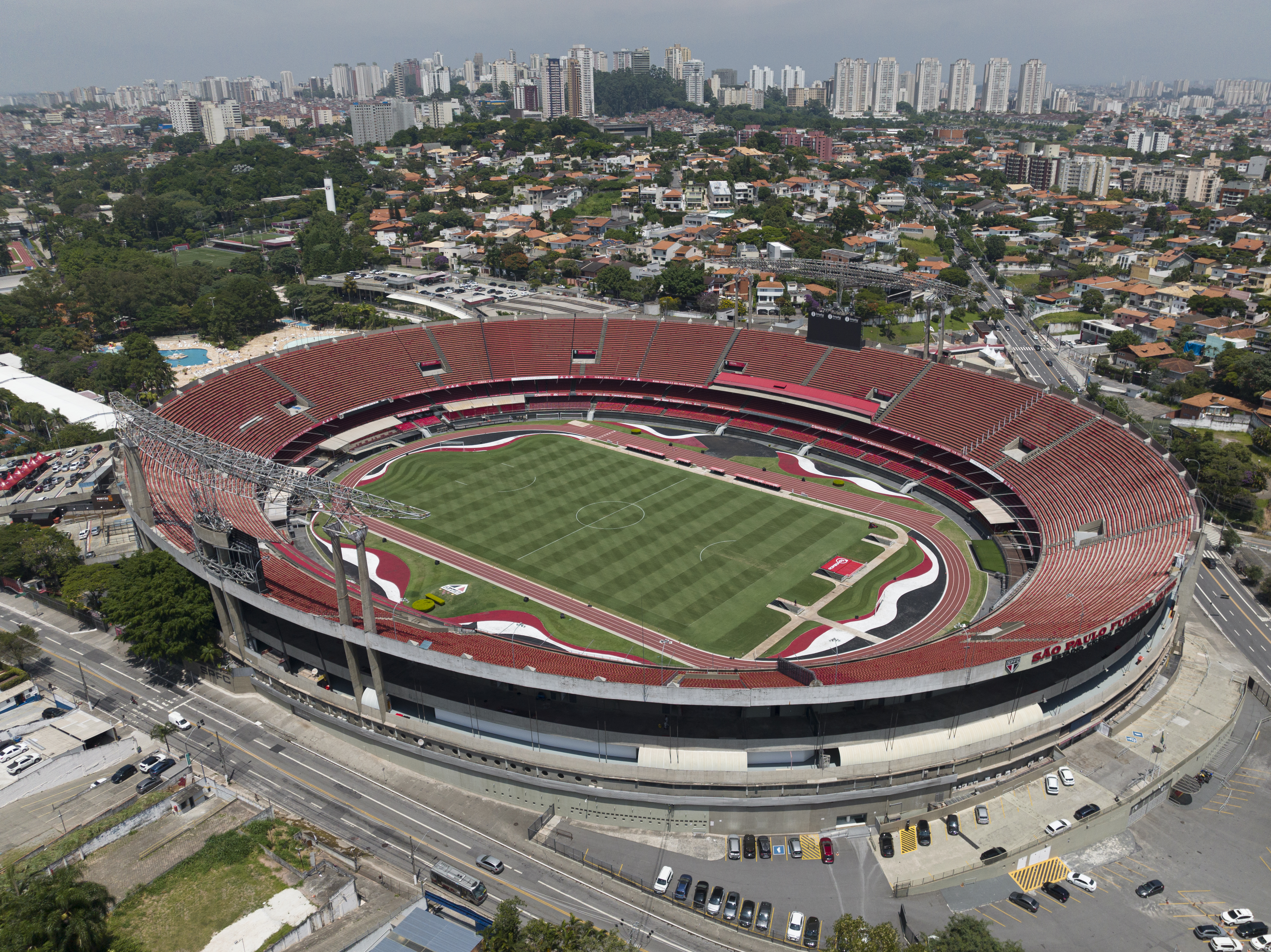
Aerial view of the Morumbi Stadium.

São Paulo's iconic 72,039 seater stadium is officially named Estádio Cícero Pompeu de Toledo (Cicero Pompeu de Toledo Stadium) and commonly known by the nickname Estádio do Morumbi (Morumbi Stadium). It was designed by architect Vilanova Artigas and it's considered a monument in Brazilian modernism. Due to its significant cultural and architectural importance, São Paulo's administration chose to include the stadium in its cultural preservation list, effectively eliminating any chance of modification and modernization in the stadium.

MorumBIS has been on the list since 2018, but after the signature of a multi-million refurbishment deal with WTorre, São Paulo's prefecture agreed to withdraw the stadium's name for the list, paving the way for a R$800 million modernization to be complete by 2030.

In late 2023, Mondelez bought the Naming rights to the stadium for a record R$25 million a year, on a 5-year contract, temporarily changing the stadium's name to "MorumBIS". Also in 2023, Live Nation Entertainment signed a R$ 60 million 5-year deal with the club for concerts and events in the Stadium, the deal being the most expensive of its kind.

The first game played at the stadium was on 2 October 1960, when São Paulo won 1–0 in a friendly match against Sporting Club from Portugal. It was inaugurated in with a maximum sitting capacity of 120,000 people, but now its maximum capacity is 72,039 seats.

The club also owns two training grounds, one named Centro de Treinamento Frederico Antônio Germano Menzen (Frederico Antônio Germano Menzen Training Center), nicknamed Centro de Treinamento (CT) da Barra Funda (Barra Funda's Training Center), which is used mostly by the professional team. The other is the Centro de Formação de Atletas Presidente Laudo Natel (President Laudo Natel Athletes Formation Center), nicknamed Centro de Treinamento (CT) de Cotia (Cotia's Training Center), which is used by the youth teams.

== Players ==
=== First-team squad ===
As of 17 September 2026

Note: Flags indicate national team as defined under FIFA eligibility rules; some limited exceptions apply. Players may hold more than one non-FIFA nationality.

No.	Pos.	Nation	Player
2	DF	ITA	Rafael Tolói
5	DF	ECU	Robert Arboleda
7	MF	BRA	Lucas Moura (vice-captain)
8	MF	BRA	Marcos Antônio
9	FW	ARG	Jonathan Calleri (captain)
10	FW	BRA	Luciano
11	FW	BRA	Ferreira
12	DF	BRA	Iago Borduchi (on loan from Bahia)
13	DF	ARG	Enzo Díaz
16	MF	PAR	Damián Bobadilla
17	FW	BRA	André Silva
18	DF	BRA	Wendell
19	DF	BRA	Lucas Ramon
20	DF	POR	Aurélio Buta
21	DF	POR	Cédric Soares
22	DF	POR	Domingos Duarte
23	GK	BRA	Rafael (3rd captain)
27	FW	BRA	Victor Sá
28	MF	BRA	Newton

No.	Pos.	Nation	Player
29	MF	BRA	Pablo Maia
31	GK	PAR	Carlos Coronel
32	DF	BRA	Pedro Lima (on loan from Wolverhampton Wanderers)
34	FW	BRA	Tetê
35	DF	BRA	Sabino
37	FW	BRA	Artur (on loan from Botafogo)
41	GK	BRA	João Pedro
43	FW	BRA	Gustavo Santana
45	FW	BRA	Lucca Marques
46	MF	BRA	Pedro Ferreira
48	MF	BRA	Djhordney
49	FW	BRA	Ryan Francisco
50	GK	BRA	Young
52	GK	BRA	Felipe Preis
53	DF	BRA	Isac
54	DF	BRA	Luis Osorio
56	DF	BRA	Nicolas
80	MF	BRA	Cauly (on loan from Bahia)
94	MF	BRA	Danielzinho

=== Youth players with first team numbers ===
As of 19 June 2026

Note: Flags indicate national team as defined under FIFA eligibility rules; some limited exceptions apply. Players may hold more than one non-FIFA nationality.

No.	Pos.	Nation	Player
40	DF	BRA	Igor Felisberto
41	DF	BRA	Igão
44	DF	BRA	Guilherme Reis
47	FW	BRA	Brenno
55	FW	BRA	Matheus Ferreira

No.	Pos.	Nation	Player
57	FW	COL	Juan Potes
58	FW	BRA	Pedro Bezerra
59	MF	BRA	Robert William
60	DF	BRA	Pedro Oliveira

=== Other players under contract ===
Note: Flags indicate national team as defined under FIFA eligibility rules; some limited exceptions apply. Players may hold more than one non-FIFA nationality.

No.	Pos.	Nation	Player
—	DF	BRA	Marques Rickelme
—	DF	BRA	Matheus Belém

No.	Pos.	Nation	Player
—	MF	BRA	Mateus Manso

=== Out on loan ===
Note: Flags indicate national team as defined under FIFA eligibility rules; some limited exceptions apply. Players may hold more than one non-FIFA nationality.

No.	Pos.	Nation	Player
—	GK	BRA	Jandrei (at Juventude until 30 November 2026)
—	DF	ARG	Alan Franco (at Tigres until 30 June 2027)
—	DF	BRA	Maik (at Dukla Banská Bystrica until 30 June 2027)
—	DF	BRA	Maílton (at Fortaleza until 30 November 2026)
—	DF	BRA	Patryck Lanza (at Juventude until 30 November 2026)
—	MF	BRA	Alisson (at Fluminense until 31 December 2026)
—	MF	BRA	Cauã Lucca (at Luverdense until 30 November 2026)

No.	Pos.	Nation	Player
—	MF	BRA	Felipe Negrucci (at Athletic-MG until 30 November 2026)
—	MF	BRA	Hugo Leonardo (at Mito HollyHock until 30 June 2027)
—	MF	SEN	Iba Ly (at Juventude until 30 November 2026)
—	FW	BRA	Cauã Lucas (at Villa Nova until 30 November 2026)
—	FW	CHI	Gonzalo Tapia (at Columbus Crew until 30 June 2027)
—	FW	BRA	Paulinho (at Torreense until 30 June 2027)

=== Retired numbers ===
No.	Player	Nationality	Position	Reason
01	Rogério Ceni	Brazil	Goalkeeper	Club legend (1990–2015)

=== Notable players ===
Sources:

- Adílson
- (Argentina) Gustavo Albella
- Alex Silva
- Alfredo Ramos
- Aloísio Chulapa
- Márcio Amoroso
- Antônio Carlos Zago
- Araken Patusca
- Arlindo
- Barthô
- Bauer
- Juliano Belletti
- Hilderaldo Bellini
- Bernardo
- Humberlito Borges
- Breno
- Cafu
- Canhoteiro
- Careca
- Chicão
- Cicinho
- Dagoberto
- Danilo
- (Uruguay) Darío Pereyra
- Nílton de Sordi
- Denílson
- (Uruguay) Diego Lugano
- Dinho
- Dino Sani
- Elivélton
- Fabão
- Paulo Roberto Falcão
- (Uruguay) Pablo Forlán
- França
- Friaça
- Arthur Friedenreich
- Gérson
- Getúlio
- Gilberto Sorriso
- Gilmar Rinaldi
- Gino Orlando
- Hernanes
- Hugo
- Jorge Wagner
- Josué
- Juninho
- Júnior
- Jurandir
- Kaká
- King
- Leonardo Araújo
- Leônidas da Silva
- Lucas Moura
- Luís Fabiano
- Luisinho
- Macedo
- Mário Sérgio
- Maurinho
- Mauro Ramos
- Mineiro
- Miranda
- Mirandinha
- Müller
- Nelsinho
- Noronha
- Oscar Bernardi
- Palhinha
- Paraná
- (Uruguay) Pedro Rocha
- Pintado
- Pita
- (Argentina) José Poy
- Raí
- Remo Januzzi
- Renato
- (Argentina) Armando Renganeschi
- Riberto
- Ricardo Rocha
- Richarlyson
- Roberto Dias
- Rogério Ceni
- Ronaldão
- Ronaldo Luiz
- Rui Campos
- (Argentina) Antonio Sastre
- Serginho
- Serginho Chulapa
- Paulo Silas
- Williamis Souza
- Teodoro
- Teixeirinha
- Terto
- Toninho Cerezo
- Toninho Guerreiro
- Válber
- Waldemar de Brito
- Waldir Peres
- Alberto Zarzur
- Zé Sérgio
- Zé Teodoro
- Zetti
- Zizinho

== Personnel ==
=== Current technical staff ===
Position	Staff
Head coach	Dorival Júnior
General Manager	Rui Costa
Coordinator	Rafinha
Supervisors	Michel Gazola; José Carlos dos Santos
Assistant coach	Lucas Silvestre; Pedro Sotero; James Freitas; Milton Cruz
Fitness Coaches	Pedro Campos; Ricardo Ferreira
Goalkeeping Coaches	Octávio Ohl; Márcio Aguiar
Market Manager	Matheus Steinmetz
Analysts	Luis Hoenen; Guilherme Pires; Caio Pires; Mairon Rodrigues; Gustavo Somavilla; Bruno Belle; Guilherme Lyra; João Marcos Soares
Medical management	Hilton Lutfi; José Sanchez
Medical Staff	Bruno Schiefer
Physiotherapists	Bruno Nestlehner; Igor Phillips; Leandro Carvalho; Gilvan Arruda; João Ribeiro
Physiologysts	Rafael Grazioli
Youth Sector Coordinator	Eduardo Biazotto
U20 Manager	Julio Baptista; Mário Ramalho (assistant)
U17 Manager	Menta; Marcos Vizolli (assistant)
U15 Manager	Vinicius Santos

Last updated: 19 May 2026
Source: Official website

== Club rivalries ==
=== São Paulo vs. Corinthians ===
The game between these clubs is also known as "Majestoso", a name coined by Thomas Mazzoni. The first "Majestoso" occurred on 25 May 1930. The fixture has seen 110 wins for São Paulo, 131 wins for Corinthians and 114 draws.

=== São Paulo vs. Palmeiras ===
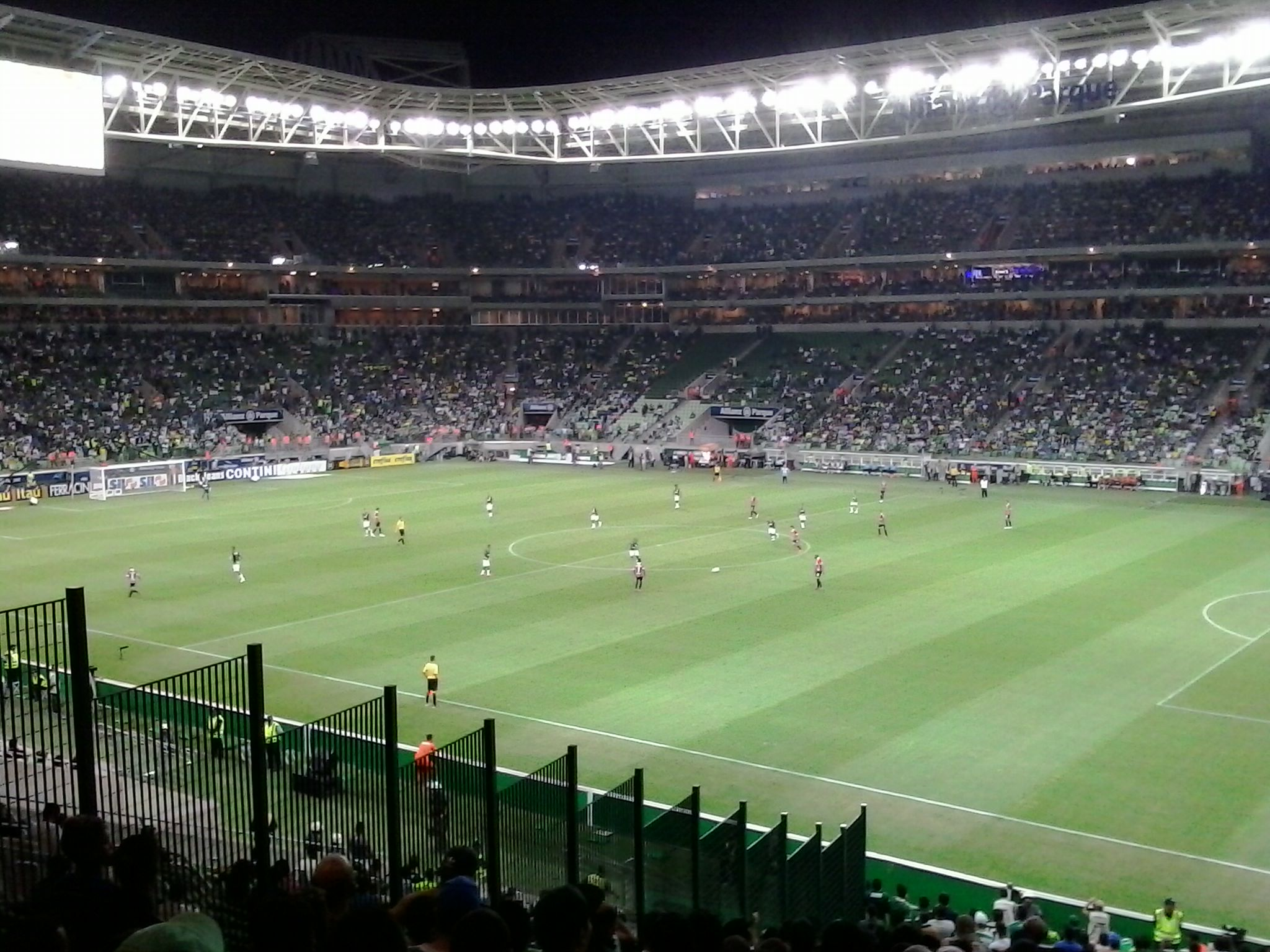
First Choque-Rei in Allianz Parque in March 2015

This fixture is nicknamed the "Choque Rei", and has seen 114 wins by São Paulo, 113 wins by Palmeiras and 110 draws.

=== São Paulo vs. Santos ===
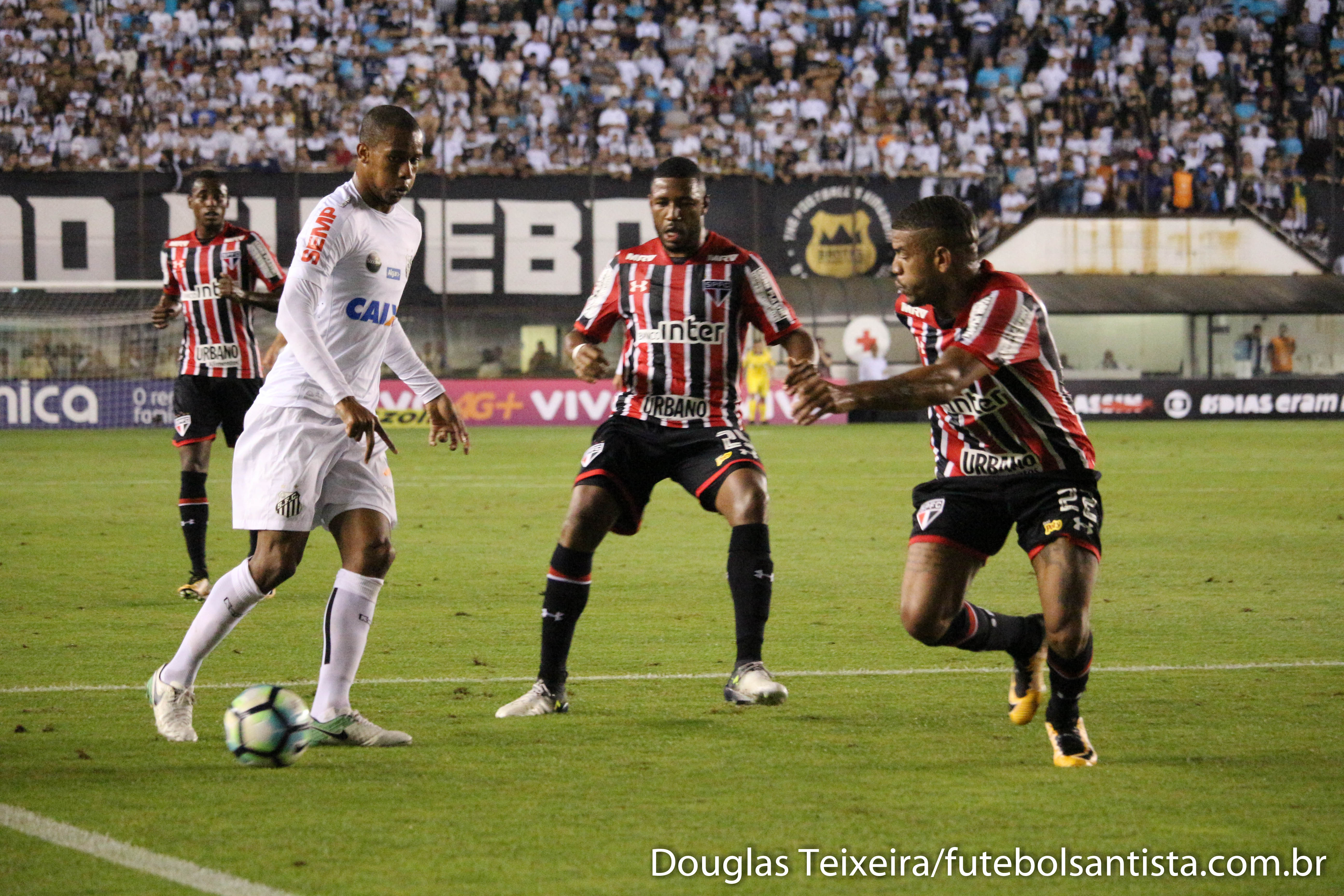
San-São between Santos and São Paulo played in Vila Belmiro in 2017 for Campeonato Brasileiro

Also known as "San-São", this fixture was first played in 1936. Since then, São Paulo have won it 137 times, Santos 106, and there have been 75 draws.

== Honours ==
São Paulo FC is one of the most successful clubs in Brazil, having won a total of 32 domestic honours, in addition to their 12 international successes. It is the Brazilian club with the most international titles. By winning the 2024 Supercopa do Brasil, São Paulo became the first Brazilian club to win all available trophies.

=== Official tournaments ===
Worldwide
Competitions	Titles	Seasons
FIFA Club World Cup	1	2005
Intercontinental Cup	2	1992, 1993
Continental
Competitions	Titles	Seasons
Copa Libertadores	3	1992, 1993, 2005
Copa Sudamericana	1	2012
Supercopa Libertadores	1	1993
Recopa Sudamericana	2	1993, 1994
Copa CONMEBOL	1	1994
Copa Masters CONMEBOL	1	1996
National
Competitions	Titles	Seasons
Campeonato Brasileiro Série A	6	1977, 1986, 1991, 2006, 2007, 2008
Copa do Brasil	1	2023
Supercopa do Brasil	1	2024
Inter-state
Competitions	Titles	Seasons
Torneio Rio–São Paulo	1	2001
State
Competitions	Titles	Seasons
Campeonato Paulista	22	1931, 1943, 1945, 1946, 1948, 1949, 1953, 1957, 1970, 1971, 1975, 1980, 1981, 1985, 1987, 1989, 1991, 1992, 1998, 2000, 2005, 2021
Supercampeonato Paulista	1	2002

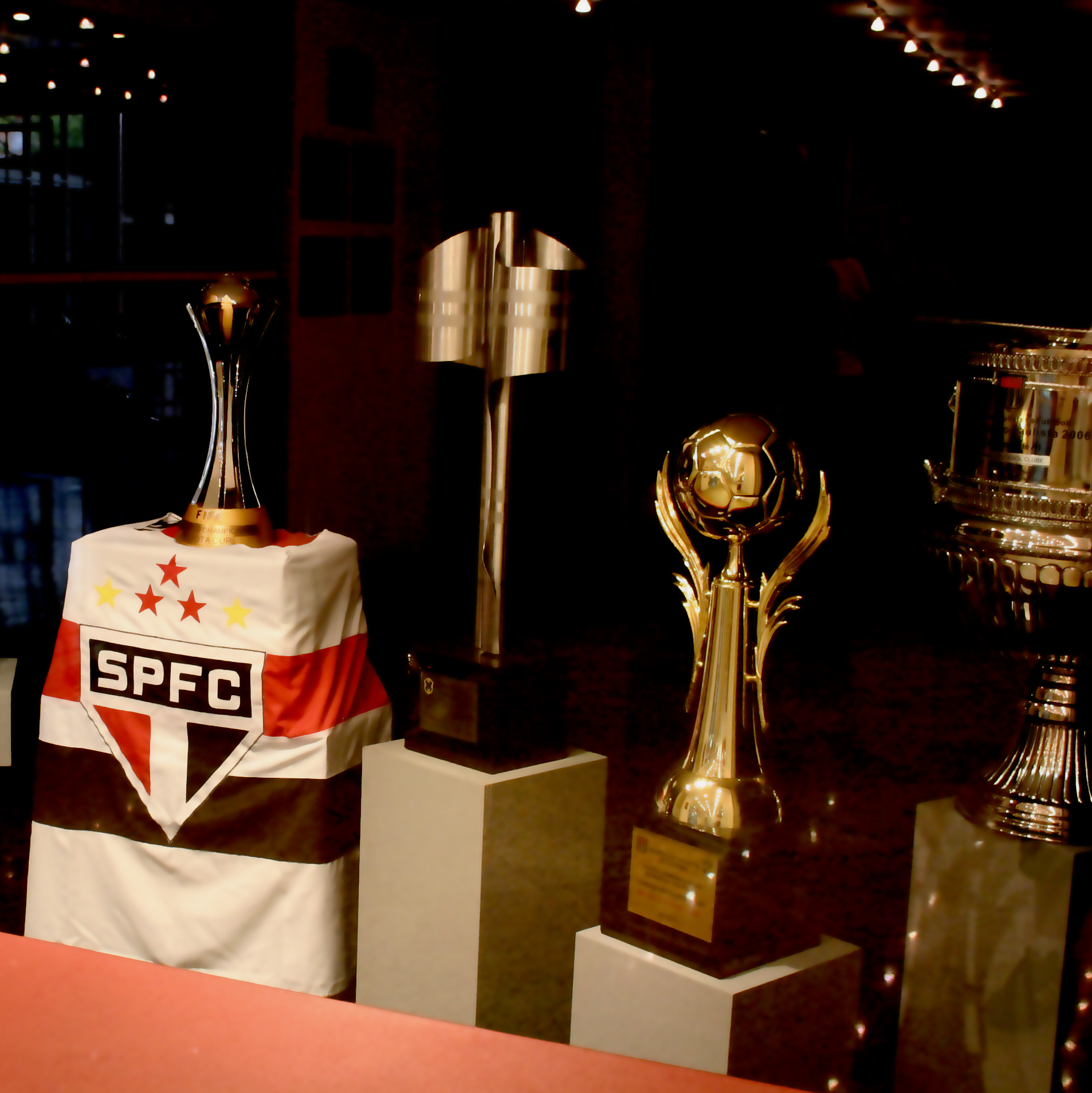
Some trophies in Luiz Cássio dos Santos Werneck memorial.

- record

Undefeated title

=== Others tournaments ===
==== International ====
- Small Club World Cup (2): 1955, 1963
- Pentagonal Tournament of Guadalajara (1): 1960
- Cali Quadrangular Tournament (1): 1960
- Sporting Club de Portugal Cup (1): 1960
- Sport Lisboa e Benfica Trophy (1): 1968
- Trofeo Colombino (1): 1969
- Nabi Abi Chedid Trophy (1): 1981
- International Summer Tournament (1): 1982
- Real Madrid Trophy (1): 1986
- Jamaica Cup (1): 1987
- Super Soccer Cup (2): 1988, 1989
- Leon Quadrangular Tournament (1): 1990
- Ciutat de Barcelona Trophy (2): 1991, 1992
- Ramón de Carranza Trophy (1): 1992
- Teresa Herrera Trophy (1): 1992
- Trofeo Ciudad de Santiago (1): 1993
- Trofeo Bortolotti (1): 1995
- Copa Euro-América (1): 1999
- Copa Pachuca (1): 1999
- Torneio Constantino Cury (1): 2000
- Eusébio Cup (1): 2013
- Florida Cup (1): 2017

==== National ====
- Taça Dr. Cunha Bueno (1): 1930
- Taça General Eurico Gaspar Dutra (1): 1943
- Olimpíada Tricolor (1): 1944
- Troféu Dr. Ademar de Barros (1): 1948
- Pentagonal Rio-São Paulo (1): 1949
- Taça Armando Arruda Pereira (1): 1952
- Troféu O Mais Querido (1): 1968
- Torneio Independência do Brasil (1): 1971
- Torneio Nunes Freire (1): 1976
- Copa São Paulo - Taça Governador Laudo Natel (1): 1976
- Torneio Rei Dadá (1): 1995
- Copa dos Campeões Mundiais (2): 1995, 1996
- Troféu Osmar Santos (4): 2006, 2007, 2018, 2020
- Troféu João Saldanha (4): 2006, 2007, 2008, 2012

==== Inter-state ====
- Taça dos Campeões Estaduais Rio–São Paulo (11): 1931, 1943, 1945, 1946, 1948, 1954, 1958, 1975, 1980, 1985, 1987

==== State ====
- Torneio dos Cinco Clubes (1): 1934
- Taça Cidade de São Paulo (1): 1944
- Torneio Prefeito Lineu Prestes (1): 1950
- Torneio Roberto Gomes Pedrosa (1): 1956
- Taça Charles Miller (1): 1956
- Taça Piratininga (4): 1967, 1969, 1970, 1971
- Torneio Eduardo José Farah (1): 1988
- Torneio Início (3): 1932, 1940, 1945

=== Runners-up ===
- Torneio Octogonal Rivadavia Correa Meyer (1): 1953
- Copa Libertadores (3): 1974, 1994, 2006
- Copa Sudamericana (1): 2022
- Recopa Sudamericana (2): 2006, 2013
- Supercopa Libertadores (1): 1997
- Copa de Oro (2): 1995, 1996
- Suruga Bank Championship (1): 2013
- Campeonato Brasileiro (6): 1971, 1973, 1981, 1989, 1990, 2014
- Copa do Brasil (1): 2000
- Copa dos Campeões da Copa Brasil (1): 1978
- Copa dos Campeões (1): 2001
- Torneio Rio – São Paulo (4): 1933, 1962, 1998, 2002
- Campeonato Paulista de Futebol (25): 1930, 1932, 1933, 1934, 1938, 1941, 1944, 1950, 1952, 1956, 1958, 1962, 1963, 1967, 1972, 1978, 1982, 1983, 1994, 1996, 1997, 2003, 2006, 2019, 2022

=== Youth team ===
- U-20 Copa Libertadores (1): 2016
- Campeonato Brasileiro Sub-23 (1): 2020
- Copa do Brasil Sub-20 (4): 2015, 2016, 2018, 2024
- Supercopa do Brasil Sub-20 (1): 2018
- Copa do Brasil Sub-17 (2): 2013, 2020
- Supercopa do Brasil Sub-17 (1): 2020
- Copa São Paulo de Futebol Júnior (5): 1993, 2000, 2010, 2019, 2025
- Taça Belo Horizonte de Juniores (4): 1987, 1997, 2016, 2017
- Copa Rio Grande do Sul de Futebol Sub-20 (3): 2015, 2016, 2017
- Copa Votorantim Sub-15 (6): 1991, 1992, 2013, 2014, 2016, 2024

=== Awards ===
- Fita Azul (1): 1964

Fita Azul do Futebol Brasileiro (Brazilian Football Blue Ribbon) was an award given for the club which succeeds in an excursion out of the country.

== Seasons ==
=== Campeonato Brasileiro Série A record ===
Torneio Roberto Gomes Pedrosa

1967	1968	1969	1970
10°	10°	13°	14°

Campeonato Brasileiro

1971	1972	1973	1974	1975	1976	1977	1978	1979	1980	1981	1982	1983	1984	1985	1986	1987	1988	1989	1990	1991	1992	1993	1994	1995	1996	1997	1998	1999	2000
2°	9°	2°	10°	5°	25°	1°	19°	—	9°	2°	6°	5°	17°	22°	1°	6°	11°	2°	2°	1°	6°	4°	6°	12°	11°	12°	15°	4°	11°
2001	2002	2003	2004	2005	2006	2007	2008	2009	2010	2011	2012	2013	2014	2015	2016	2017	2018	2019	2020	2021	2022	2023	2024	2025					
7°	5°	3°	3°	11°	1°	1°	1°	3°	9°	6°	4°	9°	2°	4°	10°	13°	5°	6°	4°	13°	9°	11°	6°	8°					

=== Campeonato Paulista record ===
1930	1931	1932	1933	1934	1935	1936	1937	1938	1939	1940	1941	1942	1943	1944	1945	1946	1947	1948	1949	1950	1951	1952	1953	1954	1955	1956	1957	1958	1959
2°	1°	2°	2°	2°	—	8°	7°	2°	5°	6°	2°	3°	1°	2°	1°	1°	4°	1°	1°	2°	4°	2°	1°	3°	3°	2°	1°	2°	4°
1960	1961	1962	1963	1964	1965	1966	1967	1968	1969	1970	1971	1972	1973	1974	1975	1976	1977	1978	1979	1980	1981	1982	1983	1984	1985	1986	1987	1988	1989
8°	3°	2°	2°	5°	5°	5°	2°	5°	3°	1°	1°	2°	8°	4°	1°	7°	3°	2°	8°	1°	1°	2°	2°	4°	1°	4°	1°	3°	1°
1990	1991	1992	1993	1994	1995	1996	1997	1998	1999	2000	2001	2002	2003	2004	2005	2006	2007	2008	2009	2010	2011	2012	2013	2014	2015	2016	2017	2018	2019
15°	1°	1°	3°	2°	5°	2°	2°	1°	3°	1°	8°	—	2°	5°	1°	2°	3°	3°	4°	4°	4°	3°	3°	6°	4°	8°	4°	3°	2°
2020	2021	2022	2023	2024	2025																								
6°	1°	2°	6°	5°	3°																								

== See also ==
- São Paulo FC (women)
- São Paulo FC (youth)
- São Paulo FC (basketball)
- São Paulo FC (futsal)
- List of world champion football clubs
