= Luís Carlos Galter =

Brazilian footballer (1947–2025)

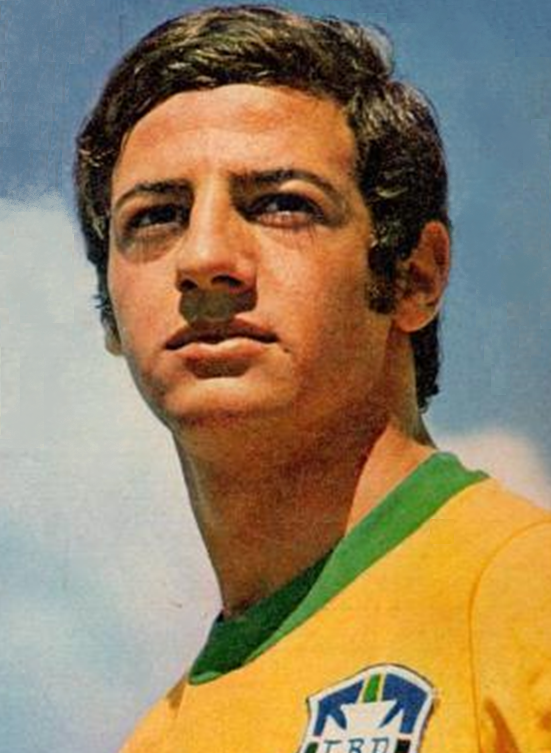
- Gálter in 1972

Personal information
- Full name: Luís Carlos Gálter
- Date of birth: 17 October 1947
- Place of birth: São Paulo, São Paulo, Brazil
- Date of death: 7 March 2025 (aged 77)
- Place of death: São Paulo, São Paulo, Brazil
- Position: Defender

Youth career
- Corinthians

Senior career*
Years	Team	Apps	(Gls)
1967–1974	Corinthians	333	(0)
1974–1975	Flamengo	120	(0)
1976	Operário–MS		(0)
1976–1978	Coritiba		(0)

International career
1971–1972	Brazil	1	(0)
- * Club domestic league appearances and goals

Luís Carlos Galter (17 October 1947 – 7 March 2025) was a Brazilian footballer who played as a defender for Corinthians and Flamengo throughout the 1970s. He also briefly represented his home country internationally playing in the Brazil Independence Cup.

== Club career ==
Galter began his career by playing in the youth sector of Corinthians throughout the 1960s. He had a classic and imposing style that even managed to stop Pelé. He was also known for his talents in jumping and a his immense notion of coverage. He was included within the starting XI at 20 years of age with his first match being on 21 September 1967 in a 4–0 victory against Bragantino. He continued this success by participating in the Corinthians' winning streak over Santos in 1968 with the São Paulan team beating Santos by 2–0. The club nearly achieved a title during the 1969 Campeonato Paulista but ended up in last place following the car crash that killed footballers Eduardo Neves and Lidu. Later that year, he played in the 1969 Trofeo Costa del Sol where the club became champions following a 2–1 victory over Barcelona and later earn subsequent titles in the 1971 Torneio do Povo and the 1973 Torneio Laudo Natel. His tenure with the club lasted from 1967 and 1974, being an effective starter throughout these years. However, he was bitter about the fact that he never achieved a single title for Alvinegro da Capital, due to the drought of titles that Corinthians experienced between 1954 and 1977. Despite this, he still managed to become an idol of the club throughout the 1970s. He made 333 appearances for the club without any goals with his only goal being an own goal. His final match for the club was on 16 September 1973 in a 1–0 loss against Tiradentes–PI.

In 1974, he played for Flamengo where he won his first title in the 1974 Carioca Championship. He played in around 118 matches throughout his tenure with the club according to the Flamengo Almanac, authored by Roberto Assaf and Clóvis Martins. In the second half of 1975, he transferred to Operário–MS based in Mato Grosso do Sul. In 1976, he signed with Coritiba as a replacement for Oberdan Vilain. Throughout the year, he won the 1976 Mato Grosso Championship and the 1976 Paranaense Championship before retiring from football in 1978.

== International career ==
Galter briefly represented his home country of Brazil from 1971 to 1972, being part of the squad for the Brazil Independence Cup.

== Personal life and death ==
Galter lived in Águas da Prata, where he served as a teacher in a local football school for young footballers. He died in São Paulo on 7 March 2025, at the age of 77.
