= 1938 São Paulo FC season =

São Paulo
1938 season
- Chairman: Cid Matos Viana; Piragibe Nogueira
- Manager: Vicente Feola; Tito Rodrigues
- Campeonato Paulista: Runners-up

The 1938 football season was São Paulo's 9th season since the club's founding in 1930.

== Overall ==
Games played	42 (10 Campeonato Paulista, 32 Friendly match)
Games won	18 (6 Campeonato Paulista, 12 Friendly match)
Games drawn	6 (2 Campeonato Paulista, 4 Friendly match)
Games lost	18 (2 Campeonato Paulista, 16 Friendly match)
Goals scored	93
Goals conceded	79
Goal difference	+14
Best result	8–1 (H) v Luzitano - Campeonato Paulista - 1938.11.13
Worst result	0–5 (H) v Portuguesa - Campeonato Paulista - 1939.04.02
Most appearances	
Top scorer	

Source: São Paulo FC

== Friendlies ==
January 8 National	Estudante Paulista	4–1	São Paulo	São Paulo
	Goal		Goal	Stadium: Estádio Palestra Itália (Parque Antarctica)

January 16 National	São Paulo	3–1	Portuguesa	São Paulo
	Goal		Goal	Stadium: Estádio Palestra Itália (Parque Antarctica)

January 22 National	São Paulo	1–0	Ypiranga	São Paulo
	Goal			Stadium: Estádio Palestra Itália (Parque Antarctica)

January 27 National	São Paulo	0–1	Portuguesa	São Paulo
			Goal	Stadium: Estádio Palestra Itália (Parque Antarctica)

February 6 National	Portuguesa Santista	6–3	São Paulo	Santos
	Goal		Goal	Stadium: Estádio Ulrico Mursa

February 17 National	São Paulo	4–0	Luzitano	São Paulo
	Goal			Stadium: Estádio Palestra Itália (Parque Antarctica)

February 20 National	Rio Claro	3–3	São Paulo	Rio Claro
	Goal		Goal	Stadium: Estádio Municipal de Rio Claro

February 24 International	São Paulo (Brazil)	3–2	(Paraguay) Libertad	São Paulo
	Goal		Goal	Stadium: Estádio Palestra Itália (Parque Antarctica)

March 13 Taça Alberto Casser	Savóia	1–2	São Paulo	Sorocaba

April 6 National	Portuguesa	4–1	São Paulo	São Paulo
	Goal		Goal	Stadium: Rua Cesário Ramalho

April 13 National	Palestra Itália	2–1	São Paulo	São Paulo
	Goal		Goal	Stadium: Estádio Palestra Itália (Parque Antarctica)

April 21 National	Paulista	2–3	São Paulo	Jundiaí
	Goal		Goal

May 19 National	São Paulo	2–3	Corinthians	São Paulo
	Goal		Goal	Stadium: Estádio Palestra Itália (Parque Antarctica)

June 9 National	São Paulo	1–1	Corinthians	São Paulo
	Goal		Goal	Stadium: Estádio Palestra Itália (Parque Antarctica)

July 3 National	Portuguesa	3–0	São Paulo	São Paulo
	Goal

August 7 National	São Caetano EC	1–5	São Paulo	São Caetano do Sul
	Goal		Goal

August 25 National	São Paulo	3–0	Corinthians	São Paulo
	Goal			Stadium: Estádio Palestra Itália (Parque Antarctica)

September 4 National	Corinthians	3–1	São Paulo	São Paulo
	Goal		Goal	Stadium: Estádio Alfredo Schürig (Parque São Jorge)

September 7 National	Portuguesa Santista	3–3	São Paulo	Santos
	Goal		Goal	Stadium: Estádio Ulrico Mursa

September 11 National	AA Botucatuense	0–3	São Paulo	Botucatu
			Goal	Stadium: Estádio Antônio Delmanto

September 18 Taça II Regimento	Pirassununguense	2–5	São Paulo	Pirassununga
	Goal		Goal

October 20 National	São Paulo	2–0	São Paulo Railway	São Paulo
	Goal			Stadium: Estádio Palestra Itália (Parque Antarctica)

October 22 Taça Cigarros Triannon	Botafogo-SP	2–2	São Paulo	Ribeirão Preto
	Goal		Goal

October 27 National	Palestra Itália	2–1	São Paulo	São Paulo
	Goal		Goal	Stadium: Estádio Alfredo Schürig (Parque São Jorge)

November 15 National	Portuguesa	3–2	São Paulo	São Paulo
	Goal		Goal	Stadium: Rua Cesário Ramalho

December 8 National	São Paulo	2–4	Flamengo	São Paulo
	Goal		Goal	Stadium: Estádio Palestra Itália (Parque Antarctica)

=== Paulista Extra ===
April 10 Taça Arthur Tarantino	Espanha	4–0	São Paulo	Santos
	Goal			Stadium: Vila Macuco

May 8 Taça Arthur Tarantino	São Paulo	3–1	Ypiranga	São Paulo
	Goal		Goal	Stadium: Estádio Antônio Alonso (Antarctica Paulista)

June 5 Taça Arthur Tarantino	Palestra Itália	4–2	São Paulo	São Paulo
	Goal		Goal	Stadium: Estádio Palestra Itália (Parque Antarctica)

June 12 Taça Arthur Tarantino	São Paulo	3–1	Espanha	São Paulo
	Goal		Goal	Stadium: Estádio Palestra Itália (Parque Antarctica)

June 26 Taça Arthur Tarantino	Ypiranga	1–0	São Paulo	São Paulo
	Goal			Stadium: Rua dos Ituanos

July 10 Taça Arthur Tarantino	Palestra Itália	3–0	São Paulo	São Paulo
	Goal			Stadium: Estádio Palestra Itália (Parque Antarctica)

=== Torneio Noturno ===
November 20 National	Corinthians	3–1	São Paulo	São Paulo
	Goal		Goal	Stadium: Estádio Alfredo Schürig (Parque São Jorge)

December 22 National	Palestra Itália	1–0	São Paulo	São Paulo
	Goal			Stadium: Estádio Palestra Itália (Parque Antarctica)

== Official competitions ==
=== Campeonato Paulista ===
March 27 Round 1	Ypiranga	1–0	São Paulo	São Paulo
	Goal			Stadium: Rua dos Ituanos

October 9 Round 2	Espanha	2–4	São Paulo	Santos
	Goal		Goal	Stadium: Vila Macuco

November 6 Round 3	São Paulo	2–1	Portuguesa	São Paulo
	Goal		Goal	Stadium: Estádio Antônio Alonso (Antarctica Paulista)

November 13 Round 4	São Paulo	8–1	Luzitano	São Paulo
	Goal		Goal	Stadium: Chácara da Floresta

November 27 Round 5	São Paulo	5–0	Santos	São Paulo
	Goal			Stadium: Estádio Antônio Alonso (Antarctica Paulista)

December 4 Round 6	São Paulo Railway	0–2	São Paulo	São Paulo
			Goal	Stadium: Avenida Santa Marina

December 18 Round 7	São Paulo	2–2	Juventus	São Paulo
	Goal		Goal	Stadium: Estádio Palestra Itália (Parque Antarctica)

March 26, 1939 Round 8	São Paulo	6–0	Palestra Itália	São Paulo
	Goal			Stadium: Estádio Antônio Alonso (Antarctica Paulista)

April 2, 1939 Round 9	São Paulo	0–5	Portuguesa	São Paulo
			Goal	Stadium: Estádio Antônio Alonso (Antarctica Paulista)

April 23/25, 1939 Round 10	Corinthians	1–1	São Paulo	São Paulo
	Goal		Goal	Stadium: Estádio Alfredo Schürig (Parque São Jorge)

==== Record ====
Final Position	Points	Matches	Wins	Draws	Losses	Goals For	Goals Away	Win%
2nd	14	10	6	2	2	30	13	70%
