= 1938 Campeonato Paulista =

Campeonato Paulista
- Season: 1938
- Champions: Corinthians
- Matches played: 55
- Goals scored: 209 (3.8 per match)
- Top goalscorer: Elyseo (São Paulo) – 13 goals
- Biggest home win: São Paulo 8–1 Luzitano (December 11, 1938)
- Biggest away win: São Paulo 0–5 Portuguesa (April 2, 1939)
- Highest scoring: São Paulo 8–1 Luzitano (December 11, 1938)

The 1938 Campeonato Paulista da Primeira Divisão, organized by the LFESP (Liga de Futebol do Estado de São Paulo), was the 37th season of São Paulo's top professional football league. Corinthians won the title for the 10th time. No teams were relegated. São Paulo's Elyseu was the top scorer with 13 goals.

== System ==
The championship was disputed in a single-round robin system, with the team with the most points winning the title.

Due to the national team's preparation for the World Cup, the championship was interrupted in April, and would return only in late September. To avoid having the teams spend five months without any activity, an extra tournament was created to fill the teams' schedules. That tournament would have the teams divided into three groups of four, with each playing the teams in its own group twice, and the champions of Group B qualifying directly to the Finals, while the champions of Groups A and C played each other to define the other finalist. Palestra Itália won that tournament, beating Corinthians in the Finals, and to this day there is a debate about whether the extra tournament qualifies as a Paulista championship.

== Championship ==
| Pos | Team | Pld | W | D | L | GF | GA | GD | Pts | Qualification or relegation |
|---|---|---|---|---|---|---|---|---|---|---|
| 1 | Corinthians | 10 | 7 | 3 | 0 | 19 | 8 | +11 | 17 | Champions |
| 2 | São Paulo | 10 | 6 | 2 | 2 | 30 | 13 | +17 | 14 | |
| 3 | Portuguesa Santista | 10 | 6 | 1 | 3 | 22 | 13 | +9 | 13 | |
| 4 | Palestra Itália | 10 | 5 | 2 | 3 | 21 | 22 | −1 | 12 | |
| 5 | Santos | 10 | 4 | 1 | 5 | 22 | 18 | +4 | 9 | |
| 6 | Juventus | 10 | 4 | 1 | 5 | 14 | 15 | −1 | 9 | |
| 7 | Portuguesa | 10 | 4 | 0 | 6 | 20 | 18 | +2 | 8 | |
| 8 | Hespanha | 10 | 4 | 0 | 6 | 15 | 18 | −3 | 8 | |
| 9 | São Paulo Railway | 10 | 3 | 2 | 5 | 19 | 23 | −4 | 8 | |
| 10 | Ypiranga | 10 | 4 | 0 | 6 | 15 | 23 | −8 | 8 | |
| 11 | Luzitano | 10 | 2 | 0 | 8 | 12 | 38 | −26 | 4 | |
| 12 | Estudantes | 0 | 0 | 0 | 0 | 0 | 0 | 0 | 0 | Folded |

Updated to match(es) played on April 25, 1939. Source: RSSSF.com
Rules for classification: 1) points; 2) goal difference; 3) wins; 4) head-to-head points.

== Extra tournament ==
=== First stage ===
==== Group A ====
| Pos | Team | Pld | W | D | L | GF | GA | GD | Pts | Qualification or relegation |
|---|---|---|---|---|---|---|---|---|---|---|
| 1 | São Paulo Railway | 6 | 3 | 3 | 0 | 13 | 8 | +5 | 9 | Qualified to Semifinals |
| 2 | Estudantes | 4 | 2 | 1 | 1 | 8 | 5 | +3 | 5 (Note: Estudantes merged with São Paulo in May and didn't play its last two matches against Portuguesa Santista.) | |
| 3 | Portuguesa | 6 | 1 | 2 | 3 | 8 | 13 | −5 | 4 | |
| 4 | Portuguesa Santista | 4 | 0 | 2 | 2 | 7 | 10 | −3 | 2 | |

Updated to match(es) played on July 17, 1938. Source: RSSSF.com
Rules for classification: 1) points; 2) goal difference; 3) wins; 4) head-to-head points.

==== Group B ====
| Pos | Team | Pld | W | D | L | GF | GA | GD | Pts | Qualification or relegation |
|---|---|---|---|---|---|---|---|---|---|---|
| 1 | Corinthians | 6 | 4 | 2 | 0 | 10 | 4 | +6 | 10 | Qualified to Finals |
| 2 | Santos | 6 | 3 | 1 | 2 | 12 | 6 | +6 | 7 | |
| 3 | Luzitano | 6 | 1 | 2 | 3 | 5 | 11 | −6 | 4 | |
| 4 | Juventus | 6 | 1 | 1 | 4 | 7 | 3 | +4 | 3 | |

Updated to match(es) played on July 17, 1938. Source: RSSSF.com
Rules for classification: 1) points; 2) goal difference; 3) wins; 4) head-to-head points.

==== Group C ====
| Pos | Team | Pld | W | D | L | GF | GA | GD | Pts | Qualification or relegation |
|---|---|---|---|---|---|---|---|---|---|---|
| 1 | Palestra Itália | 6 | 5 | 0 | 1 | 15 | 5 | +10 | 10 | Qualified to Semifinals |
| 2 | Hespanha | 6 | 3 | 1 | 2 | 9 | 6 | +3 | 7 | |
| 3 | São Paulo | 6 | 2 | 0 | 4 | 8 | 10 | −2 | 4 | |
| 4 | Ypiranga | 6 | 1 | 1 | 4 | 6 | 13 | −7 | 3 | |

Updated to match(es) played on July 17, 1938. Source: RSSSF.com
Rules for classification: 1) points; 2) goal difference; 3) wins; 4) head-to-head points.

=== Semifinals ===
| Team 1 | Agg. | Team 2 | 1st leg | 2nd leg |
|---|---|---|---|---|
| São Paulo Railway | 1–4 | Palestra Itália | 1-1 | 0–3 |

=== Finals ===
| 21 August 1938 | Palestra Itália | 0 – 0 | Corinthians | Parque Antárctica, São Paulo |
| | | | | Referee: Arthur Cidrim |

| 18 September 1938 | Corinthians | 1 – 2 | Palestra Itália | Parque Antárctica, São Paulo |
| | Teleco 70' | | Barrilote 16'; Rolando 54' | Referee: José Alexandrino |
