= Elyseo =

Brazilian footballer

Personal information
- Full name: Elyseo de Siqueira
- Date of birth: 14 June 1914
- Place of birth: São Paulo, Brazil
- Date of death: 29 May 1990 (aged 75)
- Place of death: São Paulo, Brazil
- Position: Forward

Senior career*
Years	Team	Apps	(Gls)
1932–1933	AA São Bento		
1934–1935	Portuguesa Santista		
1935–1936	Palestra Itália	8	(9)
1936	Corinthians	2	(0)
1937	Estudante Paulista		
1938–1940	São Paulo	51	(36)
1940	Palestra Itália	14	(9)
1941	Comercial-SP		
- * Club domestic league appearances and goals as of 13 September 2023

Elyseo de Siqueira (14 June 1914 – 29 May 1990), simply known as Elyseo, was a Brazilian professional footballer who played as a forward.

== Career ==
Elyseo began his career at AA São Bento in 1932, and with the end of the club he moved to Portuguesa Santista. In 1936 he went to Palestra Itália, where he won the LPF title. He played for Corinthians and Estudante Paulista, and when the latter was absorbed by São Paulo, he also came as a player. In 1938 he was top scorer in the Campeonato Paulista, scoring 13 goals.

== Honours ==
Palmeiras

- Campeonato Paulista: 1936, 1940

Individual

- 1938 Campeonato Paulista top scorer
