= Zuza (footballer, born 1911) =

Brazilian footballer (1911–1977)

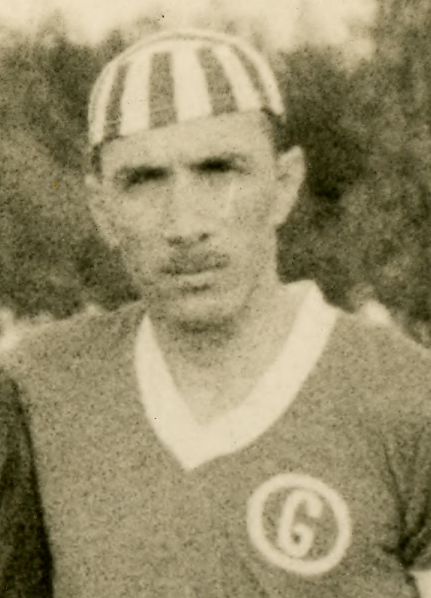

Personal information
- Full name: Luís Stevan de Siqueira Neto
- Date of birth: 2 October 1911
- Place of birth: Jundiaí, Brazil
- Date of death: 6 July 1977 (aged 65)
- Place of death: São Carlos, Brazil
- Height: 1.70 m (5 ft 7 in)
- Position: Forward

Senior career*
Years	Team	Apps	(Gls)
1927–1928	São Carlos Football Club		
1929	Ruy Barbosa		
1930	Paulista (São Carlos)		
1930	São Carlos Football Club		
1931	Guarani		
1931–1932	Rio Claro		
1932–1937	Corinthians	37	(22)
1936	→ Rio Claro (loan)		
1938	São Paulo		
1938–1939	São Bento		
1940	Palestra Itália	10	(6)
1941–1948	Guarani		
1951–1955	Expresso São Carlos		
- * Club domestic league appearances and goals as of 8 January 2024

Luís Stevan de Siqueira Neto (2 October 1911 – 6 July 1977), better known as Zuza, was a Brazilian professional footballer who played as a forward.

== Career ==
Zuza began his career playing for teams in the city of São Carlos, still in the era when football was not fully professionalized in São Paulo. He arrived at Corinthians in 1932 and remained at the club until 1937, being part of the state champion squad. With Palestra Itália (currently SE Palmeiras) in 1940, he also won a São Paulo title.

Zuza is Guarani FC all-time top scorer, with 221 goals, with 18 scored against AA Ponte Preta.

== Honours ==
Corinthians

- Campeonato Paulista: 1937

Palmeiras

- Campeonato Paulista: 1940
