= Andrés Sánchez =

Andrés Sánchez may refer to:

- Andrés Sánchez (footballer)
- Andrés Sánchez (businessman)
