= 1941 Campeonato Paulista =

Campeonato Paulista
- Season: 1941
- Champions: Corinthians
- Matches: 110
- Goals: 507 (4.61 per match)
- Top goalscorer: Teleco (Corinthians) – 26 goals
- Biggest home win: Corinthians 7–0 Santos (June 1, 1941)
- Biggest away win: Hespanha 0–6 Corinthians (July 20, 1941); Comercial 0–6 Corinthians (October 4, 1941)
- Highest scoring: Ypiranga 7–4 Hespanha (March 23, 1941)

The 1941 Campeonato Paulista da Primeira Divisão, organized by the Federação Paulista de Futebol, was the 40th season of São Paulo's top professional football league. No teams were relegated. The top scorer was Corinthians's Teleco with 26 goals. Corinthians won the title for the 12th time.

== Championship ==
The championship was disputed in a double-round robin system, with the team with the most points winning the title.

Pos	Team	Pld	W	D	L	GF	GA	GD	Pts	Qualification or relegation
1	Corinthians	20	16	3	1	61	17	+44	35	Champions
2	São Paulo	20	13	5	2	55	32	+23	31	
3	Palestra Itália	20	12	6	2	44	19	+25	30	
4	Portuguesa	20	7	6	7	43	46	−3	20	
5	Santos	20	8	4	8	59	60	−1	20	
6	São Paulo Railway	20	7	4	9	48	53	−5	18	
7	Hespanha	20	8	2	10	48	57	−9	18	
8	Portuguesa Santista	20	4	7	9	41	43	−2	15	
9	Ypiranga	20	5	4	11	49	52	−3	14	
10	Juventus	20	5	4	11	32	49	−17	14	
11	Comercial	20	1	3	16	27	76	−49	5	

Updated to match(es) played on October 19, 1941. Source: RSSSF.com
Rules for classification: 1) points; 2) goal difference; 3) wins; 4) head-to-head points.

== Top Scores ==
Rank	Player	Club	Goals
1	Teleco	Corinthians	26
2	Guanabara	Portuguesa	15
3	Juan Raul Echevarrieta	Palestra Itália	14
4	Servílio	Corinthians	12
5	Capelozzi	Palestra Itália	11
5	Bazzoni	São Paulo	11
5	Ruy	Santos	11
5	Carabina	Santos	11
9	Teixeirinha	São Paulo	9
9	Novelli	São Paulo	9
