= Teleco =

Brazilian footballer

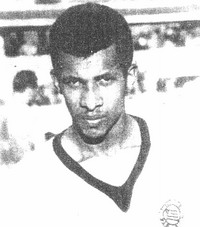

Personal information
- Full name: Uriel Fernandes
- Date of birth: 12 November 1913
- Place of birth: Curitiba, Brazil
- Date of death: 22 July 2000 (aged 86)
- Place of death: Osasco, Brazil
- Position: Striker

Senior career*
Years	Team	Apps	(Gls)
1931–1933	Britânia		
1934–1944	Corinthians	246	(251)
1944	Santos		
- * Club domestic league appearances and goals

Uriel Fernandes (12 November 1913 – 22 July 2000), commonly known as Teleco, was a Brazilian footballer who played as a striker. Most of his career was spent with Corinthians, representing the club during one full decade.

He was given the nickname Teleco by his grandmother when he was a young boy. He was referred to as "O Rei das Viradas" (King of the Twist) and "O Homem Gol" (Goal Man), for his exploits with his main club, scoring 251 goals in 246 games as well as helping it to four state titles. For these achievements, he is considered by many as a legend of the club and one of its greatest ever players.

== Football career ==
Teleco began his career with Britânia Sport Club in 1933, one of the clubs that gave rise to Paraná Clube through various mergers, before moving a year later to Corinthians.

He moved to Corinthians only two years after Paulistas armed themselves in a revolution against dictator Getúlio Vargas, becoming the first black player to play for the club. He made his debut for Corinthians on 16 December 1934, when his side was crushed 5-0 by Vasco de Gama. His first goal for the club came soon after, in the last match of 1934, netting twice in the 4-1 defeat of Portuguesa. In the first game of 1935 on 6 January, Teleco scored twice more in Corinthians's 3-0 defeat of Hespanha. On 10 February, Teleco helped his side defeat Argentine giants Boca Juniors by a score of 2-0 in an international friendly. On 4 August, he inspired his team to victory over traditional rivals Palestra Itália by a score of 4-1, ending five years without a victory over Palestra.

On 8 December 1935, Teleco helped his side to victory over Portuguesa Santista. The win would start an incredible run of 39 games without defeat for Corinthians, spanning a year and 3 months; despite this his side still fell just short of the title because of a loss in the penultimate round of the 1936 Campeonato Paulista to Palestra.

After dramatically falling short in the 1936 Campeonato Paulista to rivals Palestra, Teleco inspired Corinthians to the title in 1937 over the same team. With a broken arm, Teleco was out of the game against Palestra on 14 November 1937, but his replacement Zuza passed out on hearing that he would replace Teleco. Wearing a large jersey to hide the bamboo sling holding his arm, Teleco netted his side's first goal on the 20th minute mark, engineering a derby victory. With a 0-0 draw against Juventus and a 3-0 defeat of Clube Atlético Estudante Paulista, Corinthians won their first Paulista championship with Teleco, as he finished as the tournament's top scorer with 15 goals.

Teleco would play for a decade with Corinthians, netting 251 goals in 246 games. He earned the nickname O Rei das Viradas because of his signature move of having his back to goal before quickly twisting his body into the air to score a goal. This goal-scoring record meant that he averaged 1.02 goals a game, higher than the 0.93 mark of Brazilian legend Pelé. He played his last competitive game for the club, aged 30, against Ypiranga in March 1944. He left Corinthians as its all-time leading scorer, he now ranks third in that list behind Baltazar and Cláudio, and joined Santos for a short time before retiring from football.

In the 246 games that Teleco played with Corinthians, his side won 155 games and only lost 38 times. Teleco was top scorer of the Campeonato Paulista on five occasions, nine goals in 1935, 28 in 1936, 15 in 1937, 32 in 1939 and 26 in 1941. He also managed to win four Paulista championships during this time, 1937, 1938, 1939 and 1941. This record of five top scoring honors in a top division, ranks among some of the highest in the world, level with the greats Jean-Pierre Papin and Delio Onnis and fellow Brazilian Mario Jardel.

== Later years and death ==
Following his career, Teleco worked for Corinthians, taking care of the club's trophy room from 1967 until 1991. In 1971, the Brazilian magazine "Grandes Times Brasileiros" placed Teleco into Corinthians's All-Time Team. He died on the morning of 22 July 2000, with the cause of death being undisclosed. He was 86 years old.

== Personal life ==
Teleco was brother of the São Paulo FC goalkeeper in 1940s, King.

== Honours ==
Corinthians

- Campeonato Paulista: 1937, 1938, 1939, 1941

Individual

- Campeonato Paulista Top scorer: 1935, 1936, 1937, 1939, 1941
