= List of SC Corinthians Paulista records and statistics =

== All-time top 10 goalscorers ==
As of February 2, 2009

#	Name	Pos.	Goals
1	(Brazil) Cláudio	FW	305
2	(Brazil) Baltazar	FW	267
3	(Brazil) Teleco	FW	256
4	(Brazil) Neco	FW	239
5	(Brazil) Marcelinho Carioca	MF	206
6	(Brazil) Servílio	FW	200
7	(Brazil) Luizinho	MF	172
7	(Brazil) Sócrates	MF	172
9	(Brazil) Flávio Minuano	FW	167
10	(Brazil) Paulo	FW	149

== All-time top 10 appearances ==
As of February 07, 2024

#	Name	Pos.	Matches
1	(Brazil) Wladimir	DF	803
2	(Brazil) Cássio	GK	700
3	(Brazil) Luizinho	MF	606
4	(Brazil) Ronaldo	GK	601
5	(Brazil) Zé Maria	DF	595
6	(Brazil) Biro-Biro	MF	592
7	(Brazil) Cláudio	FW	554
8	(Brazil) Vaguinho	FW	548
9	(Brazil) Fagner	DF	541
10	(Brazil) Olavo	DF	514
