= Andrés Sánchez (businessman) =

Andrés Sanchez
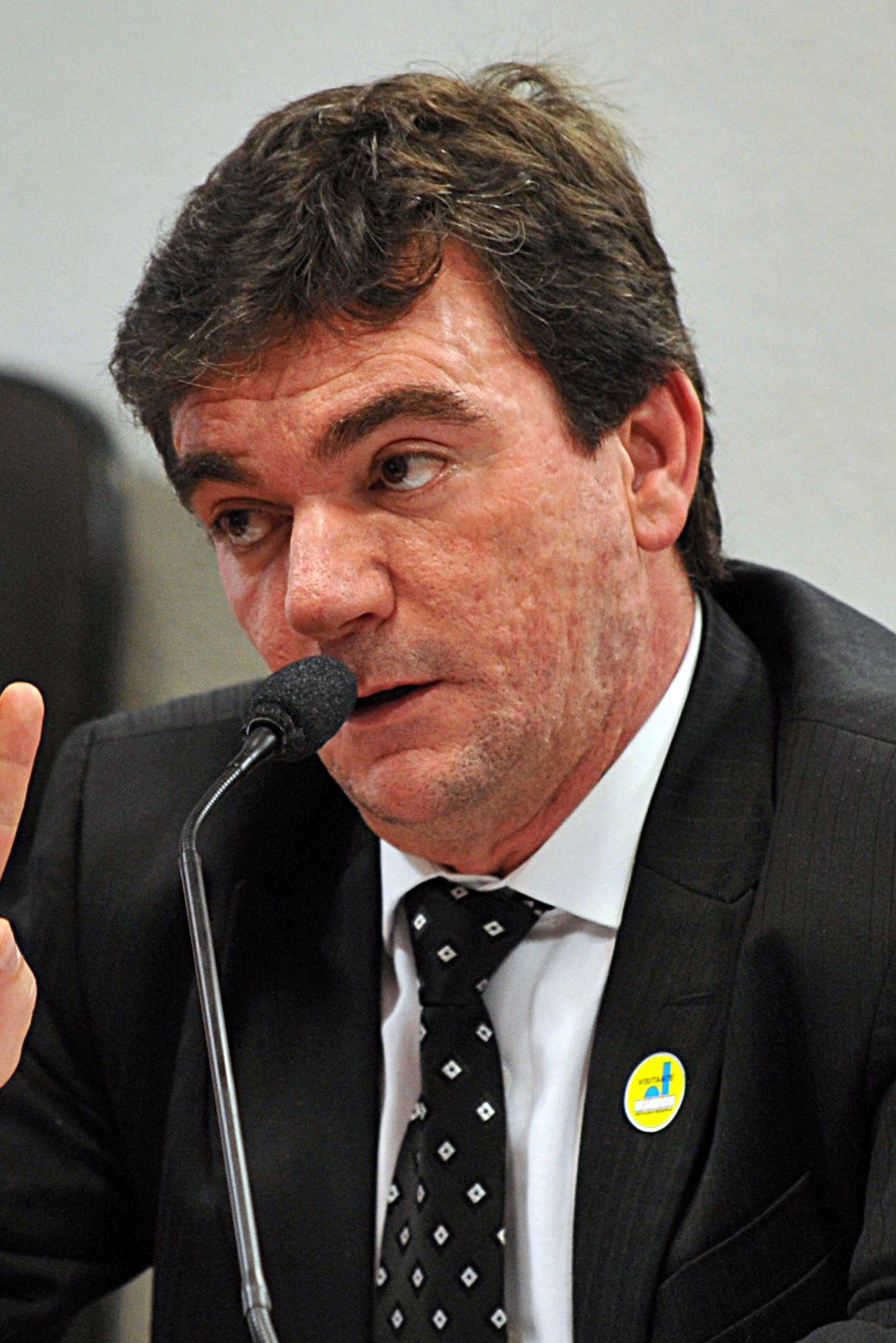

Federal Deputy from São Paulo
- Incumbent
- Assumed office 1 January 2015

President of Sport Club Corinthians Paulista
- Incumbent
- Assumed office 3 February 2018
- Vice President: Edna Murad Hadlik; Alexandre Husni
- Preceded by: Roberto de Andrade
- In office 9 October 2007 – 15 December 2011
- Preceded by: Clodomil Orsi
- Succeeded by: Mário Gobbi

Personal details
- Born: Andrés Navarro Sanchez; 24 December 1963 (age 62) Limeira, São Paulo, Brazil
- Party: PT (Since 1981)
- Profession: Businessman, sport executive

Andrés Navarro Sanchez (born 24 December 1963) is a Brazilian businessman and ex-president of Brazilian sports club Corinthians. He was elected on 9 October 2007, winning the elections with 175 votes. He was succeeded by Mario Gobbi in early 2012. On early February 2018, Sanchez returned to the presidency of the team with 1,235 votes. He was succeeded by Duilio Monteiro Alves in 2021.

In a plea to the Brazilian Public Prosecutor's Office, executives of the contractor Odebrecht presented a spreadsheet detailing payments of R$3 million (approximately US$932,000) in caixa 2. In the end of 2017, Prosecutor General Raquel Dodge denounced Sanchez to the Supreme Federal Court for the crime of tax evasion.

Sporting positions
| Preceded by Clodomil Orsi | President of Sport Club Corinthians Paulista; 2007–11; 2018–present | Succeeded by Mário Gobbi |
| Preceded by Roberto de Andrade | President of Sport Club Corinthians Paulista; 2007–11; 2018–present | Incumbent |
