= 1939 Campeonato Paulista =

Campeonato Paulista
- Season: 1939
- Champions: Corinthians
- Matches played: 110
- Goals scored: 428 (3.89 per match)
- Top goalscorer: Teleco (Corinthians) – 32 goals
- Biggest home win: São Paulo 8–1 Portuguesa Santista (December 11, 1939)
- Biggest away win: Portuguesa 1–5 Corinthians (November 5, 1939)
- Highest scoring: São Paulo Railway 7–3 Comercial (June 4, 1939)

The 1939 Campeonato Paulista da Primeira Divisão, organized by the LFESP (Liga de Futebol do Estado de São Paulo), was the 38th season of São Paulo's top professional football league. Corinthians won the title for the 11th time. No teams were relegated. The top scorer was Corinthians's Teleco with 32 goals.

== Championship ==
The championship was disputed in a double-round robin system, with the team with the most points winning the title.

Pos	Team	Pld	W	D	L	GF	GA	GD	Pts	Qualification or relegation
1	Corinthians	20	17	2	1	63	16	+47	36	Champions
2	Palestra Itália	20	13	4	3	56	25	+31	30	
3	Portuguesa	20	12	2	6	41	33	+8	26	
4	São Paulo Railway	20	11	2	7	49	41	+8	24	
5	São Paulo	20	10	1	9	41	28	+13	21	
6	Santos	20	8	4	8	35	33	+2	20	
7	Juventus	20	7	3	10	33	37	−4	17	
8	Hespanha	20	5	4	11	28	46	−18	14	
9	Portuguesa Santista	20	6	0	14	32	54	−22	12	
10	Comercial	20	4	3	13	23	64	−41	11	
11	Ypiranga	20	4	1	15	27	51	−24	9	

Updated to match(es) played on January 21, 1940. Source: RSSSF.com
Rules for classification: 1) points; 2) goal difference; 3) wins; 4) head-to-head points.
