= 1937 Campeonato Paulista =

Campeonato Paulista
- Season: 1937
- Champions: Corinthians
- Matches played: 60
- Goals scored: 218 (3.63 per match)
- Top goalscorer: Teleco (Corinthians) – 15 goals
- Biggest home win: Estudantes 8–1 Luzitano (July 11, 1937); Hespanha 9–2 Luzitano (September 19, 1937)
- Biggest away win: Hespanha 0–7 Palestra Itália (June 20, 1937)
- Highest scoring: Hespanha 9–2 Luzitano (September 19, 1937)

The 1937 Campeonato Paulista da Primeira Divisão, organized by the LPF (Liga Paulista de Futebol), was the 36th season of São Paulo's top professional football league. Corinthians won the title for the 9th time. No teams were relegated and the top scorer was Corinthians's Teleco, with 15 goals.

== System ==
The championship was disputed in two stages:

- First round: It was to be disputed in a single round-robin format, with the six beat teams advancing to the Second round.
- Second round: It was to be disputed in a single round-robin format, and the team with the most points in both stages won the title.

== Championship ==
=== First round ===
Pos	Team	Pld	W	D	L	GF	GA	GD	Pts	Qualification or relegation
1	Palestra Itália	9	8	1	0	27	4	+23	17	Qualified
2	Corinthians	9	7	1	1	26	9	+17	15	Qualified
3	Santos	9	4	3	2	23	13	+10	11	Qualified
4	Portuguesa Santista	9	4	3	2	15	11	+4	11	Qualified
5	Estudantes	9	4	1	4	22	16	+6	9	Qualified
6	Juventus	9	4	1	4	21	17	+4	9	Qualified
7	São Paulo	9	4	0	5	8	11	−3	8	
8	Hespanha	9	2	1	6	16	25	−9	5	
9	São Paulo Railway	9	2	1	6	11	25	−14	5	
10	Luzitano	9	0	0	9	5	43	−38	0	

Updated to match(es) played on September 19, 1937. Source: RSSSF.com
Rules for classification: 1) points; 2) goal difference; 3) wins; 4) head-to-head points.

=== Second round ===
Pos	Team	Pld	W	D	L	GF	GA	GD	Pts
1	Portuguesa Santista	5	4	0	1	12	7	+5	8
2	Corinthians	5	3	1	1	7	3	+4	7
3	Estudantes	5	3	0	2	9	6	+3	6
4	Palestra Itália	5	2	0	3	8	8	0	4
5	Santos	5	1	1	3	4	7	−3	3
6	Juventus	5	0	2	3	2	11	−9	2

Updated to match(es) played on December 12, 1937. Source: RSSSF.com
Rules for classification: 1) points; 2) goal difference; 3) wins; 4) head-to-head points.

=== Final standings ===
Pos	Team	Pld	W	D	L	GF	GA	GD	Pts	Qualification or relegation
1	Corinthians	14	10	2	2	33	12	+21	22	Champions
2	Palestra Itália	14	10	1	3	35	12	+23	21	
3	Portuguesa Santista	14	8	3	3	27	18	+9	19	
4	Estudantes	14	7	1	6	31	22	+9	15	
5	Santos	14	5	4	5	27	20	+7	14	
6	Juventus	14	4	3	7	23	28	−5	11	
7	São Paulo	9	4	0	5	8	11	−3	8	
8	Hespanha	9	2	1	6	16	25	−9	5	
9	São Paulo Railway	9	2	1	6	11	25	−14	5	
10	Luzitano	9	0	0	9	5	43	−38	0	

Updated to match(es) played on December 12, 1937. Source: RSSSF.com
Rules for classification: 1) points; 2) goal difference; 3) wins; 4) head-to-head points.
