= 1938 in Brazilian football =

Football in Brazil
- Season: 1938

The following article presents a summary of the 1938 football (soccer) season in Brazil, which was the 37th season of competitive football in the country.

== Campeonato Paulista ==
Final Standings

Position	Team	Points	Played	Won	Drawn	Lost	For	Against	Difference
1	Corinthians	17	10	7	3	0	19	8	11
2	São Paulo	14	10	6	2	2	30	13	17
3	Portuguesa Santista	13	10	6	1	3	22	13	9
4	Palestra Itália-SP	12	10	5	2	3	21	22	-1
5	Juventus	9	10	4	1	5	14	15	-1
6	Santos	9	10	4	1	5	22	18	4
7	Portuguesa	8	10	4	0	6	20	18	2
8	Hespanha	8	10	4	0	6	15	18	-3
9	São Paulo Railway	8	10	3	2	5	19	23	-4
10	Ypiranga-SP	7	10	4	0	6	15	23	-8
11	Luzitano	4	10	2	0	8	12	38	-26

Corinthians declared as the Campeonato Paulista champions.

== State championship champions ==
State	Champion	State	Champion
Acre	-	Paraíba	Botafogo-PB
Alagoas	CRB	Paraná	Ferroviário-PR
Amapá	-	Pernambuco	Sport Recife
Amazonas	Rio Negro	Piauí	-
Bahia	Bahia; Botafogo-BA^{(1)}	Rio de Janeiro	Fluminense de Niterói
Ceará	Fortaleza	Rio de Janeiro (DF)	Fluminense
Espírito Santo	Rio Branco-ES	Rio Grande do Norte	ABC
Goiás	-	Rio Grande do Sul	Guarany de Bagé
Maranhão	Tupan	Rondônia	-
Mato Grosso	-	Santa Catarina	CIP
Minas Gerais	Atlético Mineiro	São Paulo	Corinthians
Pará	Tuna Luso	Sergipe	not disputed

^{(1)}In 1938, two different Bahia State Championship competitions were contested. Bahia won one of the competitions while Botafogo-BA won the other.

== Other competition champions ==
Competition	Champion
Campeonato Brasileiro de Seleções Estaduais	Rio de Janeiro (DF)

== Brazil national team ==
The following table lists all the games played by the Brazil national football team in official competitions and friendly matches during 1938.

Date	Opposition	Result	Score	Brazil scorers	Competition
June 5, 1938	Poland	W	6-5	Leônidas da Silva (3), Romeu Pellicciari, Perácio (2)	World Cup
June 12, 1938	Czechoslovakia	D	1-1	Leônidas da Silva	World Cup
June 14, 1938	Czechoslovakia	W	2-1	Leônidas da Silva, Roberto	World Cup
June 16, 1938	Italy	L	1-2	Romeu Pellicciari	World Cup
June 19, 1938	Sweden	W	4-2	Leônidas da Silva (2), Romeu Pellicciari, Perácio	World Cup
