= Clodomil Orsi =

Brazilian football club president (1937–2022)

- Occupation: President of Corinthians
- Website: http://www.corinthians.com.br

Clodomil Orsi (12 June 1937 – 28 March 2022). was the Corinthians Chairman, elected on 1 August 2007, winning the elections with 264 votes. He was succeeded by Andrés Sanchez.

Clodimil Orsi worked in Corinthians with Wilson Bento and Antoine Gebran. He died in 2022.

Preceded by Alberto Dualib	President of Corinthians; 2007–present	Succeeded by Incumbent
