= Lidu =

Brazilian footballer

Personal information
- Full name: Ludgero Pereira da Silva
- Date of birth: 21 March 1947
- Place of birth: Presidente Prudente, Brazil
- Date of death: 28 April 1969 (aged 22)
- Place of death: São Paulo, Brazil
- Position: Right back

Youth career
- Prudentina

Senior career*
Years	Team	Apps	(Gls)
1964–1966	Prudentina		
1966–1968	Londrina		
1968–1969	Corinthians	36	(0)
- * Club domestic league appearances and goals as of 27 February 2024

Ludgero Pereira da Silva (21 March 1947 – 28 April 1969), better known as Lidu, was a Brazilian professional footballer who played as a right back.

== Career ==
Born in Presidente Prudente, Lidu began his career at Prudentina. He later played for Londrina, until in 1968 he was hired by Corinthians, where he made 36 appearances.

== Death ==
Lidu suffered a fatal accident behind the wheel of his Volkswagen Beetle on 28 April 1969 while heading to Parque São Jorge for a training session with Corinthians. The winger Eduardo also died.
