= Eduardo Neves =

Brazilian footballer

Eduardo
Personal information
- Full name: Eduardo Neves de Castro
- Date of birth: 29 August 1944
- Place of birth: Rio de Janeiro, Brazil
- Date of death: 28 April 1969 (aged 24)
- Place of death: São Paulo, Brazil
- Position: Left winger

Youth career
- –1961: America-RJ

Senior career*
Years	Team	Apps	(Gls)
1961–1967	America-RJ		
1968–1969	Corinthians	71	(15)

International career
1968	Brazil	7	(1)
- * Club domestic league appearances and goals as of 20 February 2024

Eduardo Neves de Castro (29 August 1944 – 28 April 1969), also known as Eduardo Neves or simply Eduardo, was a Brazilian professional footballer who played as a left winger.

== Career ==
Revealed in the youth categories of America-RJ, Neves played for the club from 1961 to 1967, when he was traded to Corinthians. He was part of the historic game to break the club's winning drought against Pelé's Santos FC on 6 March 1968. He made 71 appearances and scored 15 goals.

In 1968 Eduardo played seven matches for the Brazil national team, scoring a goal against Paraguay.

== Honours ==
Brazil

- Taça Jorge Chávez/Santos Dumont: 1968
- Taça Oswaldo Cruz: 1968

== Death ==
Eduardo and right-back Lidu died when the Volkswagen Beetle driven by the latter crashed on 28 April 1969 while they were heading to Parque São Jorge for a training session with Corinthians.
