= Luzitano Futebol Clube =

Luzitano
- Full name: Luzitano Futebol Clube
- Founded: January 1, 1920
- Dissolved: 9 April 1939; 86 years ago
Home colors	Away colors

Luzitano Futebol Clube, commonly known as Luzitano, was a Brazilian football club from São Paulo, São Paulo state. They competed in the Campeonato Paulista three times.

== History ==
Luzitano Futebol Clube was founded January 1, 1920, by Portuguese expatriates living in Brás neighborhood, São Paulo city, hence the club's name. They won the Campeonato Paulista Série B, organized by the Associação Paulista de Esportes Atléticos (APEA) in 1929, and in 1935 they won promotion to the Campeonato Paulista after winning the Campeonato Paulista Série A2. The club competed in the Campeonato Paulista for the first time in 1936, the competition was organized by the Liga Paulista de Foot-Ball (LPF), and they finished in the 11th position out of 12 clubs. Luzitano finished in the 10th position out of 10 teams in the First Stage of the 1937 edition of the league, thus failing to qualify for the Second Stage of the competition. The club participated in the Campeonato Paulista for the last time in 1938, when they finished in the 11th position, and won two games. In April 1939, the team changed its name to Comercial Futebol Clube, and would continue disputing state championships under that appellation until 1959.

== Honours ==
- Campeonato Paulista Série A2
  - Winners (1): 1935
- Campeonato Paulista Série A3
  - Winners (1): 1931
- Campeonato Paulista Série A4
  - Winners (1): 1929
