= SC Corinthians Paulista =

Corinthians
- Full name: Sport Club Corinthians Paulista
- Nicknames: Timão ("big team", augmentative of Portuguese time ("team"); Coringão; Campeão dos Campeões (Champion of Champions); Time do Povo (The People's Team); Todo Poderoso (The Almighty); Alvinegro do Parque São Jorge (Black and White of Saint George Park)
- Founded: 1 September 1910; 116 years ago
- Ground: Neo Química Arena
- Capacity: 48,205
- President: Osmar Stabile
- Head coach: Clarence Seedorf
- League: Campeonato Brasileiro Série A Campeonato Paulista
- 2025 2025: Série A, 13th of 20; Paulista, 1st of 16 (champions)
- Website: corinthians.com.br
Home colours	Away colours	Third colours

Sport Club Corinthians Paulista (Brazilian Portuguese: [isˈpɔɾtʃi ˈklubi koˈɾĩtʃɐ̃s pawˈlistɐ]) is a Brazilian professional sports club based in São Paulo, in the district of Tatuapé. Although it competes in multiple sports modalities, it is best known for its professional men's football team, which plays in the Campeonato Brasileiro Série A (Note: Also known by its nickname "Brasileirão".), the top tier of Brazilian football, as well as in the Campeonato Paulista Série A1, (Note: Also known by its nickname "Paulistão".) the first division of the traditional in-state competition.

Founded in 1910 by five railway workers inspired by the London-based Corinthian Football Club, the Sport Club Corinthians Paulista traditionally plays in a white and black home kit. Their crest was first introduced in 1939 by modernist painter and former player Francisco Rebolo, featuring the São Paulo state flag in a shield, two oars, and an anchor, representing the club's early success in nautical sports. Corinthians has played their home matches at the Neo Química Arena since 2014, which served as one of the venues for the 2014 FIFA World Cup and also hosted the opening match. The club has longstanding rivalries with Palmeiras (known as Derby Paulista or simply The Derby), São Paulo (the Clássico Majestoso), and Santos (Clássico Alvinegro).

One of the most widely supported teams in the world and the second most in Brazil, with over 30 million fans (just behind Flamengo) Corinthians is one of the most successful Brazilian clubs, having won seven national titles, four Copa do Brasil trophies, two Supercopa do Brasil titles, and a record 31 São Paulo State championships. In international competitions, the club won the inaugural FIFA Club World Championship in 2000 (the only time, as of 2025, that the Cup was won by the club qualified as the host nation representative), repeated the feat in 2012 after being crowned Copa Libertadores de América champions for the first time that same year and also won a Recopa Sudamericana title. In 2017, the club was listed by Forbes as the most valuable football club in the Americas, valued at $576.9 million.

== History ==
=== Foundation and early years ===
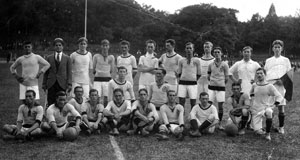
The Corinthians team in 1914

In 1910, several professional football clubs were formed among the higher echelons of São Paulo society. Among them were Club Athletico Paulistano, São Paulo Athletic Club, & Associação Atlética das Palmeiras. The lower classes, excluded from these clubs due to socioeconomic division, founded their own clubs and only played "floodplain" football.

Bucking the trend, a group of five workers of the São Paulo Railway, them being, Joaquim Ambrose and Anthony Pereira (wall painters), Rafael Perrone (shoemaker), Anselmo Correia (driver) and Carlos Silva (general laborer), residents of the neighborhood of Bom Retiro. It was 31 August 1910 when these workers were watching a match featuring a London-based club touring Brazil, Corinthian F.C. After the match, while the group returned home, the men talked about partnerships, business ideas, and general dreams of grandeur. They each surfaced one idea: the foundation of a club, after several exchanges in a lively argument, a common ground led those athletes the same dream. The arguments led to the conclusion that they would meet the next day to make their dream into reality.

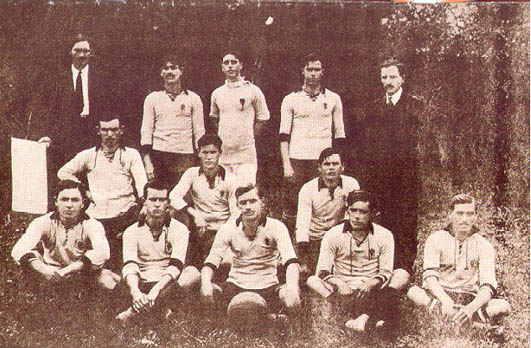
The Corinthians squad that won its first title in 1914

On 1 September 1910, the group agreed to meet after sundown in public sight. That night at 20:30 BRT (23:30 GMT), on Rua José Paulino ("Rua dos Imigrantes"; Immigrants Street), the five workers reunited alongside their guest and neighbors from Bom Retiro. That night the club was founded, alongside its board of directors, who elected Miguel Battaglia as the first Club President.

Corinthians played their first match on 10 September 1910, away against União da Lapa, a respected amateur club in São Paulo, and they were defeated by 1–0.

On 14 September, Luis Fabi scored Corinthians' first goal against Estrela Polar, another amateur club in the city, and Corinthians won their first game (2–0).

With good results and an increasing number of supporters, Corinthians joined the Liga Paulista, after winning two qualifying games, and played in the São Paulo State Championship for the first time, in 1913. Just one year after joining the league, Corinthians was crowned champion for the first time (in 1914), and were again two years later. There were many fly-by-night teams popping up in São Paulo at the time, and during the first practice held by Corinthians a banner was placed by the side of the field stating "This One Will Last".

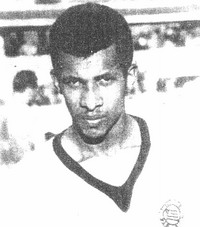
Teleco was a superb Corinthians scorer, with 251 goals in 246 matches. He became the top scorer of the Paulista Championships of 1935, 1936, 1937, 1939 and 1941. His nickname was "O rei das viradas" (The king of comebacks).

1922, the Centennial of Brazilian Independence, marks the start of Corinthians hegemony in the São Paulo State Championship. As football was almost exclusively played at Rio de Janeiro and São Paulo by that time, the two state champions were considered to be the two top clubs in Brazil. After defeating the Rio de Janeiro State Championship champion of that year, América, Corinthians joined the company of the great teams in Brazil.

The same year also marked the first of three State Championships in a row, something that happened again in 1928–30, 1937–39 and 2017-19.

Corinthians seemed destined to win State Championships in threes; after six years without being champion, they won three more from 1937 to 1939, with prolific scorer Teleco leading the line.

The 1940s were a more difficult time; and the club would win a championship in 1941 and would only win their next in 1951.

=== 1950s-2000 ===
At the beginning of the 1950s Corinthians made history in the São Paulo Championship. In 1951, the team composed of Carbone, Cláudio, Luisinho, Baltasar and Mário scored 103 goals in thirty matches of the São Paulo Championship, registering an average of 3.43 per game. Carbone was the top goal-scorer of the competition with 30 goals. The club would also win the São Paulo Championships of 1952 and 1954. In this same decade, Corinthians were champions three times of the Rio-São Paulo Championship (1950, 1953 and 1954), the tournament that was becoming most important in the country with the increased participation of the greatest clubs from the two most important footballing states in the country.

In 1953, in a championship in Venezuela, Corinthians won the Small Cup of the World, a championship that many consider as a precursor of the Worldwide Championship of Clubs. On the occasion, Corinthians, substituting for Vasco da Gama, went to Caracas, the Venezuelan capital and recorded six consecutive victories against Roma (1–0 and 3–1), Barcelona (3–2 and 1–0) and Selection of Caracas (2–1 and 2–0). The club would also win the Cup of the Centenary of São Paulo, in the same year (1954).

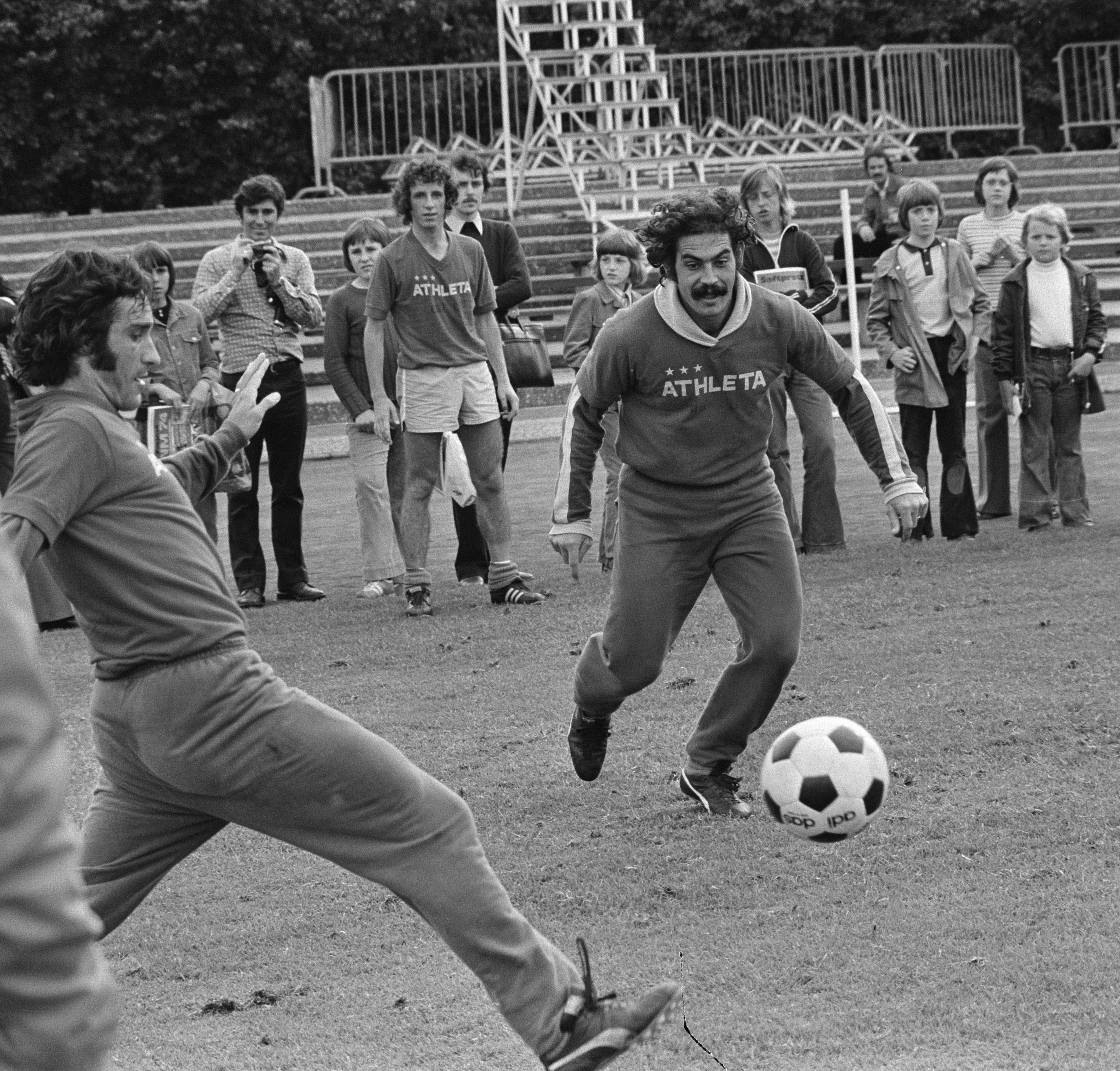
Rivellino, considered by many the greatest Corinthians player of all time.

After the triumphs in the São Paulo Championship and the Rio-São Paulo of 1954, Corinthians had a lengthy title drought. During this time a key player was Rivellino who was part of Brazil's World Cup winning team of 1970.

The breakthrough finally came when they won the São Paulo state championship in 1977, breaking a string of 23 years without a major title.

In that era, Vicente Matheus was his famous Corinthians presidente.

Under the leadership of Sócrates, Wladimir and Casagrande, Corinthians were the first Brazilian club in which players decided about concentração, a common Brazilian practice where the football players were locked up in a hotel days before a game, and discussed politics. (In the early 1980s, military dictatorship, after two decades, ended in Brazil). In 1982, before the election of government of São Paulo State, the team wore a kit with the words: "DIA 15 VOTE" (Vote on 15th), trying to motivate the biggest number of fans to vote.

In 1990, Corinthians won their first Campeonato Brasileiro Série A, beating their rivals, São Paulo in the final at the opponents' own stadium, Estádio do Morumbi. In the following year, Corinthians beat Flamengo and won the Supercopa do Brasil. In 1995, the club won the Copa do Brasil for the first time, beating Grêmio in the final at the Estádio Olímpico Monumental in Porto Alegre. In the same decade, the club won the state championship in 1995, 1997 and 1999, and won the national championship again in 1998 and in 1999. In 2000, the club won the first FIFA Club World Cup, eliminating Real Madrid in the semifinals and beating Vasco da Gama on penalties in the final.

=== 21st Century ===
In 2002 the club won the Rio-São Paulo Tournament, and the Copa do Brasil in 2002, beating Brasiliense in the final.

The club's situation in early 2004 was among the most difficult in their history. Bad administration, lack of money and terrible campaigns both in the 2003 Brazilian Championship and in the 2004 São Paulo State Championship caused their millions of supporters to worry. Fortunately, some young players and a new manager Tite helped the team to improve from their terrible start. At the end of the championship, Corinthians finished in 5th place and gained entry to the Copa Sudamericana (a minor continental championship, similar to Europa League).

This situation was one of the factors which enabled Corinthians' president, Alberto Dualib, to convince the club's advisors to sign a controversial deal with an international fund of investors called Media Sports Investment. The deal granted the company a large degree of control over the club for 10 years in exchange for large financial investments in return. This has brought many quality players to the team, such as Carlos Tevez, Roger, Javier Mascherano and Carlos Alberto.

Despite the MSI investments, Corinthians experienced a slow start in the 2005 state championship, but managed to improve as it progressed, eventually managing to finish second. Their start to the Brazilian championship during 2005 was difficult, too, but after Daniel Passarella's dismissal (due to an unexpected 5–1 loss to Corinthians' rivals, São Paulo), the club finished the championship round well, and were eventually crowned Brazilian Champions for the fourth time, after a controversial annulment of eleven games due to a betting scandal. Tevez went on to win the Brazilian League Best Player award.

The relationship between Corinthians' managers and the MSI president, Kia Joorabchian was not good, and after being eliminated in the Copa Libertadores, the club experienced a crisis which was responsible for the bad performances for the rest of 2006. Eventually, the partnership came to an end.

On 2 December 2007, following a 1–1 draw away to Grêmio, Corinthians were relegated to the second division for the first time in the club history.

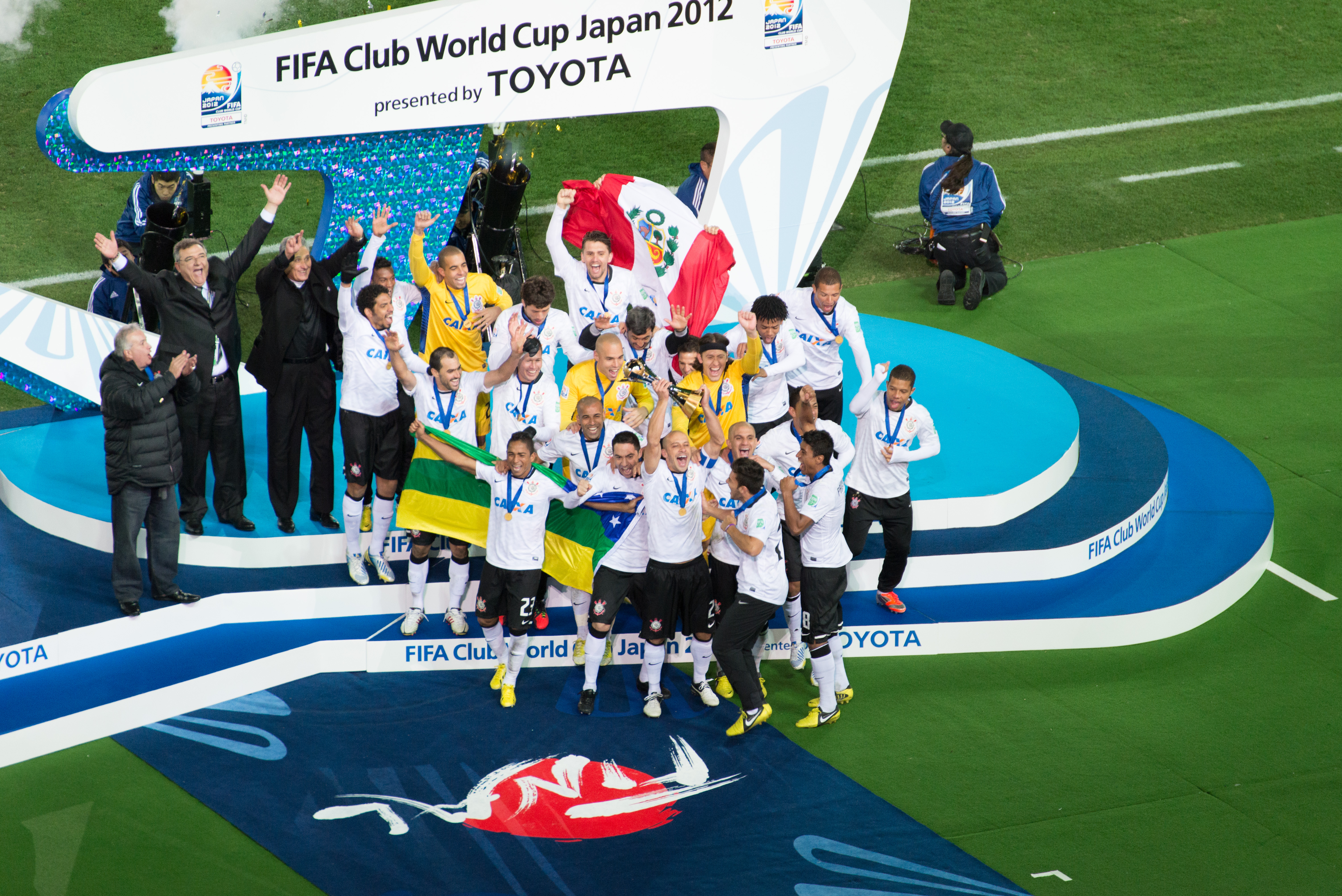
In 2012, Corinthians won their second FIFA Club World Cup title after defeating Chelsea 1–0 in the final.

Corinthians, who won promotion to the top division of Brazilian football for 2009 by winning the Serie B tournament in 2008, with the best campaign in the history of the tournament, signed with three-time FIFA Player of the Year, Ronaldo. In 2009, led by Ronaldo, Corinthians won their 26th Campeonato Paulista and their third Brazilian Cup. Confirming the club's good moment, and the 100 years of the club, Corinthians announced the construction of their new stadium, Arena Corinthians, they finished the Campeonato Brasileiro 2010 in 3rd place, granting their place on the subsequent Copa Libertadores. After being eliminated from the South American tournament by the country rivals, Flamengo, though, Corinthians saw Ronaldo retire from football. To replace him, the club signed a contract with Inter Milan legend, Adriano. In 2011, Corinthians once again were eliminated in the Copa Libertadores, but this time in the playoff round by Deportes Tolima. After that, the team went on to win their fifth national title.

On 4 July, after reaching the final of the 2012 Copa Libertadores undefeated, Corinthians won its first title after a two-match final against 6-time champions Boca Juniors by drawing 1–1 in Argentina and winning 2–0 at the Estádio do Pacaembu in São Paulo, becoming the ninth Brazilian side to win the Copa Libertadores. The club won the 2012 FIFA Club World Cup after defeating English club Chelsea 1–0 on 16 December 2012.

In 2015, the team started the year by being eliminated in the Campeonato Paulista semifinal, and then being eliminated in Libertadores and Brazilian Cup last 16, but went on to win their sixth league title. In 2017 the team started the year winning the Campeonato Paulista for the 28th time, and ending the year winning the league title for the second time in three years, and doing a historic campaign by not losing in the first 20 games of the season. In 2018, the team won the Campeonato Paulista for the 29th time, this time against their biggest rivals, Palmeiras. In 2019, Corinthians won the Campeonato Paulista for the 30th time.

In 2020, Corinthians lost the Campeonato Paulista final to arch rivals Palmeiras on penalties. In the league they finished only 10 points ahead of the first team in the relegation zone, that was the first season since 2007 that Corinthians fought against relegation. In 2021 the new president of the club brought back Willian who had left the club in 2007, helping Corinthians to finish in 5th, granting the club to the Copa Libertadores playoffs. In 2022 Corinthians had their best league season since 2017, finishing in 4th place, granting their place on the subsequent Copa Libertadores. In the Libertadores, the team finished in 2nd in the group stage, then went on to eliminate Boca Juniors in La Bombonera on penalties, reaching the quarter finals for the first time since 2012, but were eliminated to Flamengo. In the Brazilian Cup, they lost once again to Flamengo, but this time at the final, on a penalty shoot out. After all, it was considered the club's best season since 2017.

In 2023, despite being eliminated from Libertadores, the club reached the Copa Sulamericana semifinals, where they were eliminated by Fortaleza. In the league once again fought against relegation.

On September 9, 2024, Corinthians announced the signing of Dutch forward Memphis Depay, the all-time leading goalscorer for the Netherlands national team, on a contract running until the end of 2026. At the time of his arrival, the club was involved in a relegation battle in the Campeonato Brasileiro Série A. With Depay contributing to the team during the final stages of the campaign, Corinthians produced a remarkable recovery and finished the competition with an impressive run of nine consecutive victories in its final nine matches. This sequence allowed the club to equal the record for the longest winning streak in the history of the Campeonato Brasileiro during the round-robin era.

In 2025, Corinthians added further silverware to its history. The club won its 31st Campeonato Paulista title after defeating its traditional rivals Palmeiras in the final. Later that year, Corinthians also secured its fourth Copa do Brasil title, defeating Vasco da Gama in the final. The decisive match was played at the historic Maracanã Stadium, where Corinthians were crowned champions and lifted the trophy.

In 2026, Corinthians won the Supercopa Rei for the second time in its history, defeating Flamengo 2–0. Gabriel Paulista opened the scoring in the 26th minute of the first half, while Yuri Alberto scored the second goal in the 52nd minute of the second half. The victory secured another national trophy for Corinthians and added another chapter to the club’s competitive history.

== Visual identity ==
=== Colours ===
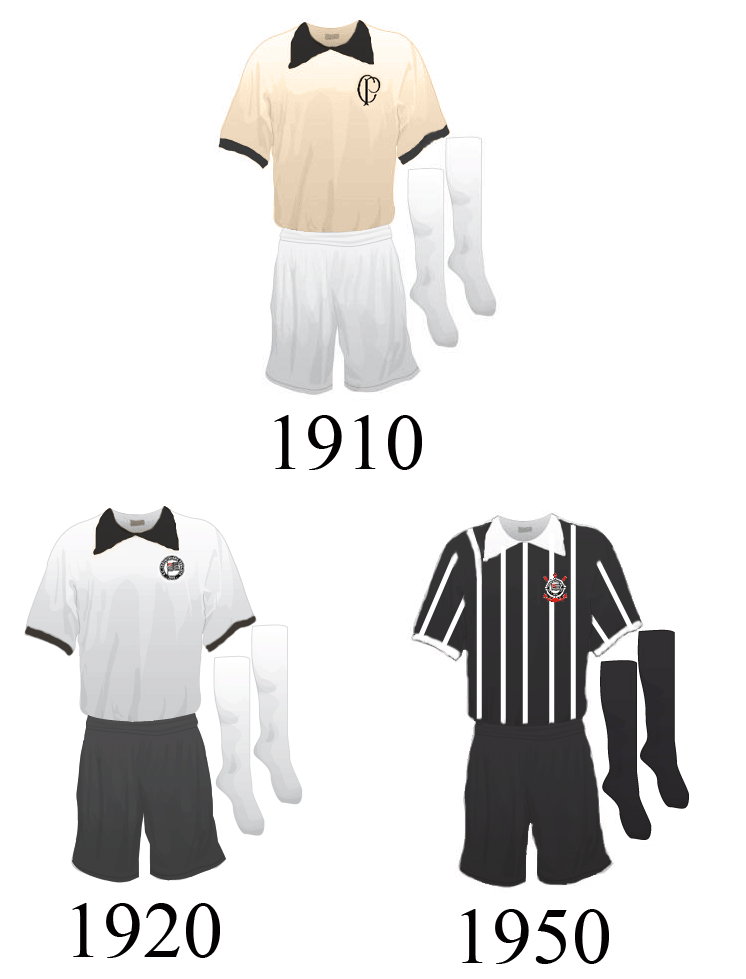
Evolutions of the uniform (From 1910 to 1950)

Even though the club has been recognized by the colors black and white for most of their history, the first Corinthians' kit originally consisted of cream shirts and black shorts. Back then, the choice of colors proved wrong, as the cream color would gradually fade white when the shirts were washed, representing a cost a recently created club could not afford. Thus, early after the foundation, the official shirt colors were changed to white. In 1954 the traditional black with thin white stripes uniform was introduced, and became the alternative uniform since then.

=== Badge ===
The Corinthians shirt had no badge or crest until 1913, when the club joined the Liga Paulista, that mandated that every club in the competition should have one in their uniforms. A simple composition of the letters C (Corinthians) and P (Paulista) was hastily created and embroidered on the players uniforms for the upcoming matches, thus being considered the club's first de facto badge.

Unlike the kit, the badge went through several changes over the years. In 1914, lithographer Hermogenes Barbuy, brother of then-player Amilcar Barbuy designed the club's first official badge, which premiered at a friendly against Torino (Italy), in São Paulo. In 1919, the round shield with the São Paulo state flag was introduced, and modified in 1939 by modernist painter Francisco Rebolo, a former reserve player of the club in the 1920s, to include a string, an anchor and two oars, representing the early success the club achieved in nautical sports. Thereafter, the badge passed through small changes over time, specifically in the flag and in the frame.

In 1990, a yellow star was added above the badge to celebrate Corinthians' first national title. The same would occur when achieving the national titles in 1998, 1999 and 2005, and a larger star was introduced in 2000 after winning the inaugural FIFA Club World Cup. The stars remained as part of the badge until 2011, when the board decided the badge would not present any stars in the future.

Badge evolution

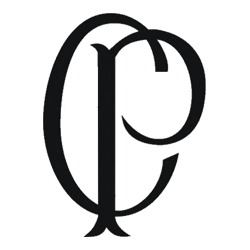
The first badge adopted by Corinthians (1913)

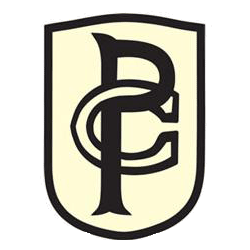
The second badge, re-discovered by historians in 2011 (1914)

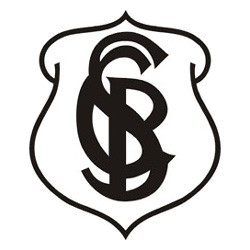
The first official badge, designed by lithographer Hermogenes Barbuy (1914–1916)

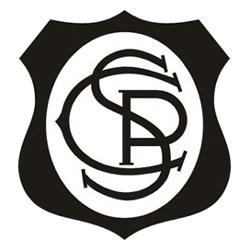
A first revision of the Barbuy's badge (1916)
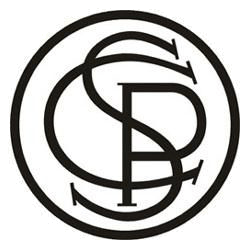
A second revision of the Barbuy's badge (1916–1919)

Current version (1979–present)

=== Kit suppliers and sponsors ===
Nike is the manufacturer of the club's kit since 2003. Previous manufacturers have been: Topper (1980–1989, 1999–2002), Finta (1990–1994) and Penalty (1995–1998).

In 2023, Corinthians and Nike have reached a 12-year U$115 million deal to renew their partnership until 2029.

Previous main sponsors have been: Bombril (1982), Cofap (1983), Citizen (1984), Bic (1984), Corona (1984), Kalunga (1985–1994), Suvinil (1995–1996), Banco Excel (1996–1998), Embratel (1998), Batavo (1999–2000; 2009), Pepsi (2000–2004), Samsung (2005–2007), Medial Saúde (2008), Hypermarcas (2009–2012), Iveco (2012), Caixa (2012–2017), Banco BMG (2019–2021), Neo Química (2021–2024), Vaidebet (2024), and Esportes da Sorte.

== Facilities ==
=== Stadiums ===
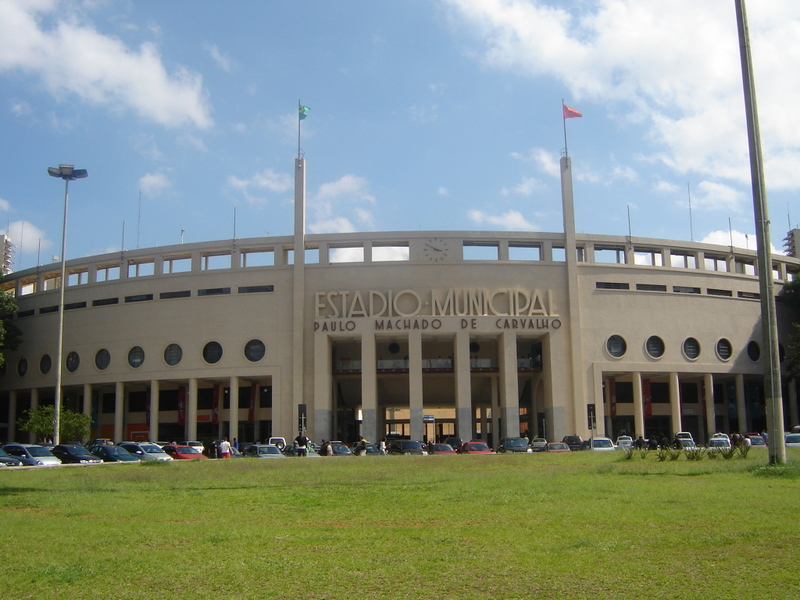
Pacaembu, Corinthians popular home from 1940 to 2014

==== Early grounds ====
The first playing ground Corinthians used was located in the neighborhood of Bom Retiro (where the club was founded in 1910), in a vacant lot owned by a firewood seller, from which it got its nickname: Campo do Lenheiro ("Lumberjack's field"). It was the time of the floodplain and the players themselves had to clean and flatten the lawn.

In January 1918, Corinthians inaugurated its first official football field, Ponte Grande, on the banks of Tiete River. The land was leased from the municipality under the influence of the intellectual Antonio de Alcantara Machado, one of the first to approach the club workers. It was built by the players and fans in a community helping system. The Corinthians played their games there until 1927, upon the completion of their first stadium. It was then donated to São Bento.

==== Parque São Jorge ====
In 1926, the club purchased Parque São Jorge ("Saint George's Park"), located within the Tatuapé district of the city, belonging to then rivals Esporte Clube Sírio, After purchasing, President Ernesto Cassano decided to reform the stage, with financial support from the members.

The renovated Parque São Jorge, still without floodlights, was inaugurated on 22 July, in a friendly game against América-RJ that ended in a 2–2 draw. The land purchased included a Syrian farm - hence the nickname Fazendinha ("Little Farm"), still used today. It was from here that the Corinthians began to develop and could build up its headquarters.

Due to their growing number of fans, Estádio Alfredo Schürig (the official name of "Fazendinha") and the commissioning of city-owned Pacaembu in the 1940s, from the 1950s the stadium was mostly used for Academy level competitions and friendly matches. The last first team match played there was a friendly against Brasiliense on 3 August 2002. Since 1997, it is also the home ground of the professional women's football team.

==== Pacaembu ====
The club has established a relationship with Paulo Machado de Carvalho Stadium, which belongs to the municipality of São Paulo and is best known as Pacaembu Stadium, inaugurated in 1940 as the largest stadium in Latin America with a capacity of more than 70,000 people, in a double-fixture that pitted rivals Palestra Italia against Coritiba in the preliminary match and then current three-time state champion Corinthians against Atlético Mineiro, in a match Corinthians won by 4–2. Currently, the Pacaembu has capacity for up to 40,000 spectators.

==== Arena Corinthians ====
In 2009 there were some conjectures that the government of São Paulo could make a deal for a 30-year allotment of Pacaembu, but it never materialized, even though it was the club's directors preference, with projects designed to that matter.

After the Estádio do Morumbi, then named as the city's host in the World Cup, failed to comply to FIFA's standards, a new project to create a home for Corinthians emerged as a possibility. In August 2010 the president of the CBF, Ricardo Teixeira, along with Governor of São Paulo state, Alberto Goldman, and the mayor of São Paulo, Gilberto Kassab announced that the opening ceremony of the World Cup of Brazil would be held in the new Corinthians Stadium to be built in the district of Itaquera, in the eastern part of São Paulo city.

On 1 September 2020 (Corinthians' 110th anniversary) a special event live from the stadium was held to announce the Arena's new name. It was officially renamed Neo Química Arena, part of a 20-year partnership with Hypera Pharma, Brazil's largest pharmaceutical company. Neo Química is Hypera's generic drugs division, which already served as Corinthians' main sponsor during the 2010 and 2011 seasons. The full contract is expected to be around R$300–320 million.

=== Training facilities ===
==== CT Joaquim Grava ====
Corinthians inaugurated their state-of-the-art training facilities in September, 2010 during the celebrations of the club's 100th anniversary. The training facilities were named after long-time associate and consulting medical doctor, Joaquim Grava, that oversaw the medical department construction.

The training facilities feature a 32 bedroom hotel for the players, a bio-mechanics complex (Lab Corinthians-R9. named after Brazilian legend Ronaldo), a center for player rehabilitation and therapy (CePROO, named after fan and journalist Osmar de Oliveira), basketball and volleyball courts (approved by FIBA and FIVB for official matches), as well as other amenities.

An extension to be used by the academy teams is currently under construction.

== Club culture ==
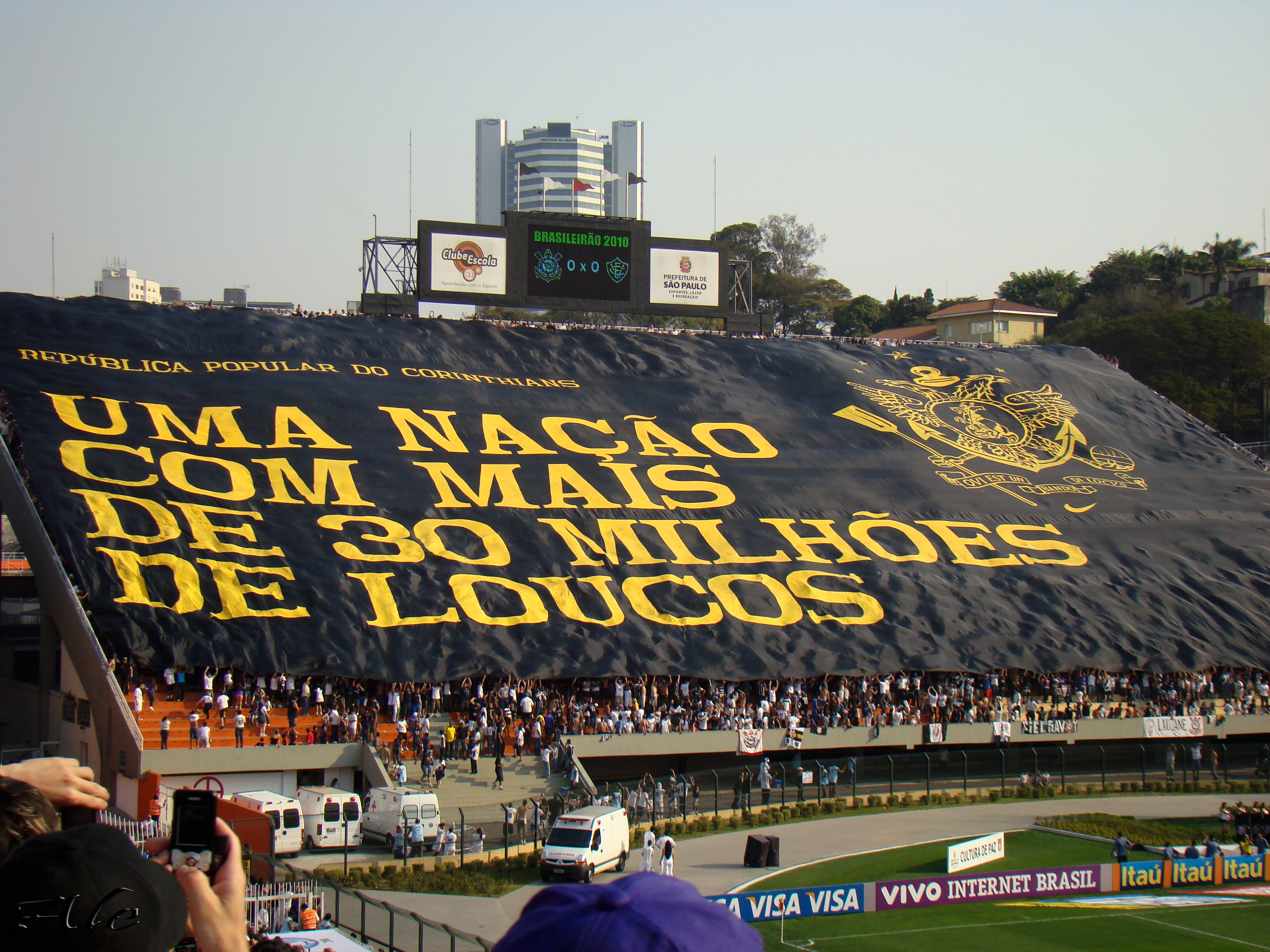
The Flag of The República Popular do Corinthians

=== Supporters ===
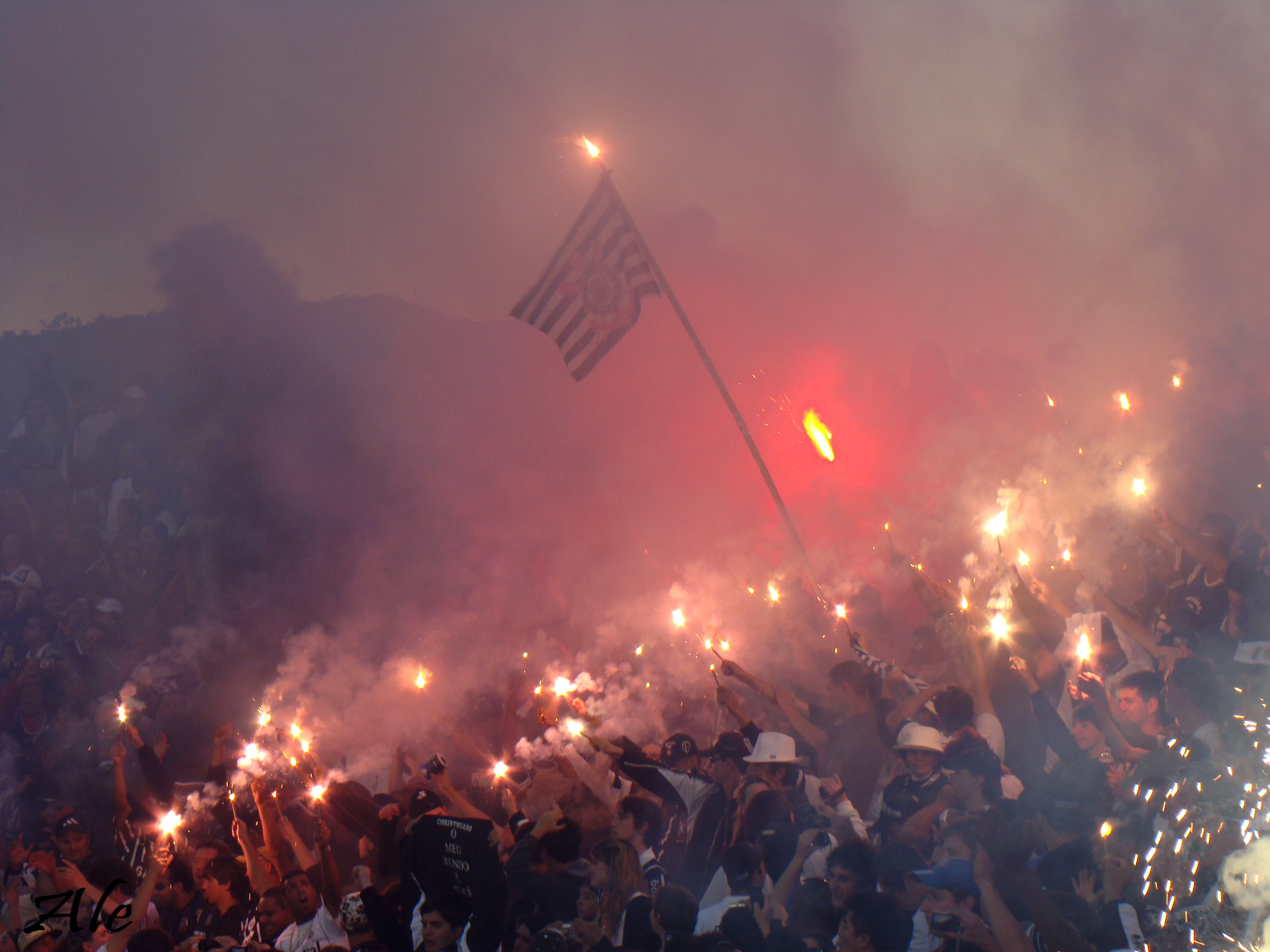
Fans of Corinthians at an away match in Florianópolis, SC

The Corinthians fan base is called the Fiel ("Faithful"), starring in memorable moments like the "Corinthian Invasion" (pt / Invasão Corinthiana) in 1976, when more than 70,000 Corinthians Fans traveled from São Paulo to Rio de Janeiro to watch the match against Fluminense at Maracanã Stadium, in that year's national championship semifinals, as well as having one of the biggest average attendances in the country. The passion and loyalty the fans had for the team motivated the club to make a tribute documentary to their fans, named "Faithful" (pt / Fiel), highlighting the fans' support in one of the most difficult moments in the club's history: the relegation to national second division in 2007. Similar initiatives would be made in the next years, reflecting other moments in the club's history in that the fanbase was essential.

Integral to the club culture are the fan organizations ("torcidas organizadas") such as Gaviões da Fiel ("The Hawks of the Faithful"), founded in 1969 by fans attempting to recover political and administrative control of the club and now the largest of such organizations in Brazil with almost 100,000 associates. Camisa 12 ("The 12th Shirt", founded in 1971), Estopim da Fiel ("Faithful's Fuse", 1979), Coringão Chopp ("Corinthians Draught Beer", 1989), Pavilhão Nove ("Pavilion Nine", 1990), and Fiel Macabra ("Macabre Faithful", 1993) are other important fan organizations that have been actively supporting social and cultural activities representing the club.

Many of the groups above have established branches for fans living outside of São Paulo city, out-state and even internationally. Most are also involved in the Brazilian Carnival festivities, most famously Gaviões da Fiel, one of the most important Carnival of São Paulo samba schools, having won the contest 4 times, the most among groups of football supporters.

=== Politics ===
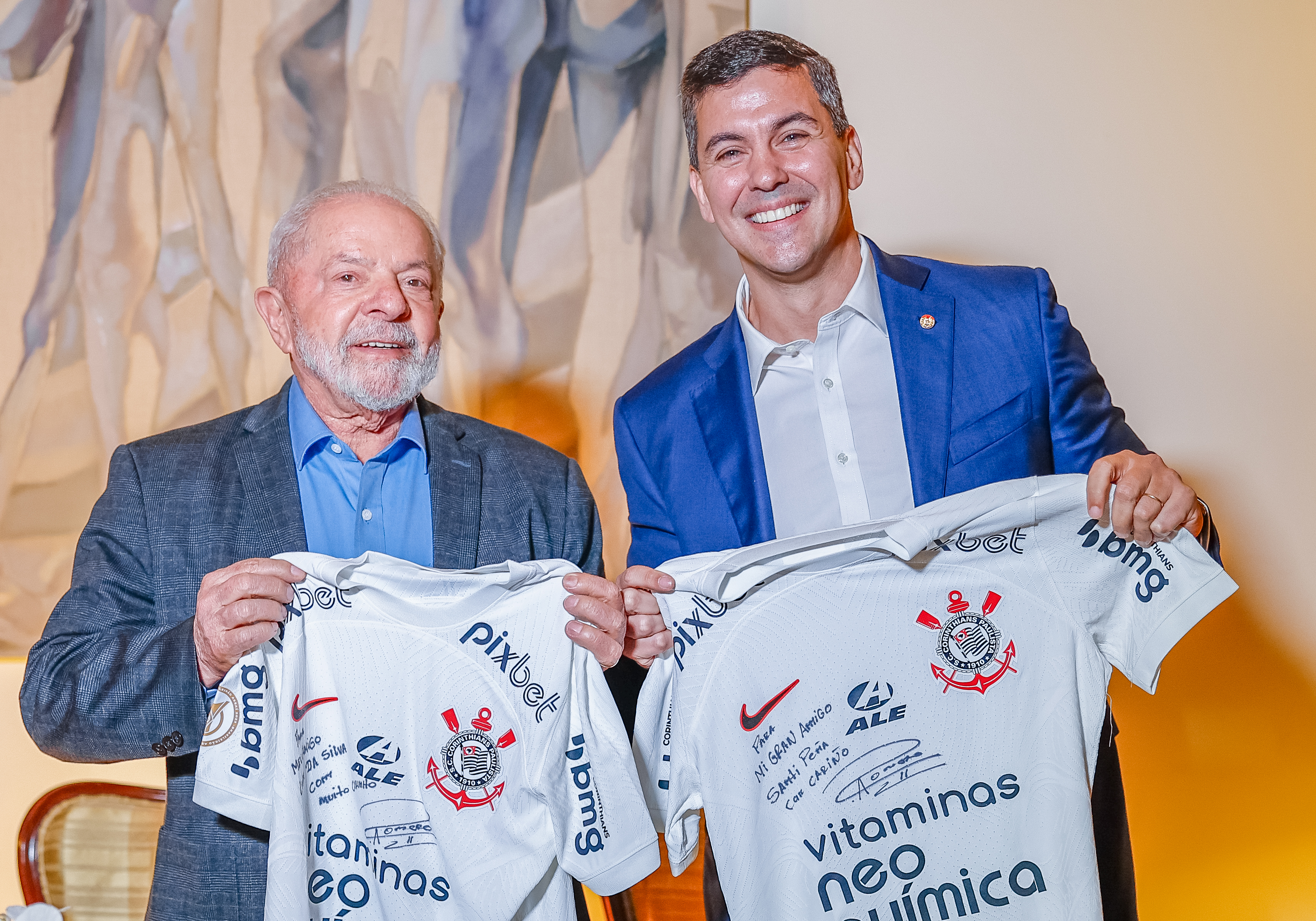
Brazilian president Lula da Silva (a known Corinthias fan) and Paraguayan president Santiago Peña in August 2023, both holding autographed Corinthians shirts from Paraguayan club player Ángel Romero.

Between 1964 and 1985, Brazil was under a military dictatorship that restricted civil liberties and suppressed democratic participation. It was against this backdrop that Sport Club Corinthians Paulista became the centre of a rare political experiment known as Democracia Corinthiana. Initiated in 1981 by sports director Adílson Monteiro Alves and embraced by players such as Sócrates, Wladimir and Casagrande, the movement implemented direct democratic practices within the team, allowing players and staff to vote on all decisions, from training schedules to club policy. In 1982, the squad wore shirts printed with the slogan “Dia 15 Vote” to promote participation in Brazil's first multiparty elections since the coup. In 1983, after winning the São Paulo state championship, the team unfurled a banner reading “Ganhar ou Perder, Mas Sempre com Democracia” ("Win or Lose, But Always with Democracy"). In April 1984, Sócrates addressed a crowd of over two million at a Diretas Já rally and pledged to leave Brazil if Congress failed to approve direct presidential elections. The amendment was defeated, and Sócrates transferred to ACF Fiorentina in Italy. The military regime in Brazil collapsed in 1985, and the Democracia Corinthiana movement remains one of the most significant examples of political activism within football, and a defining period in Corinthians’ history.

=== Rivalries ===
==== Derby Paulista ====
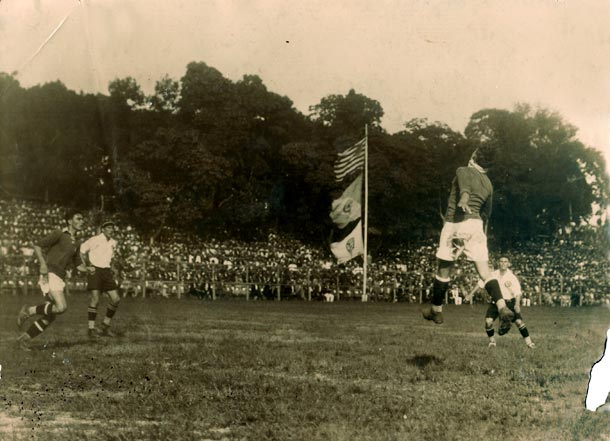
Derby Paulista, c. 1920s

Derby Paulista is a crosstown fixture between Corinthians and Palmeiras, consistently cited as one of the greatest rivalries worldwide by sources including FIFA and CNN. Palmeiras was founded by a group of Italians who were formerly members of Corinthians. Since 1914, when that act was taken, a deep rivalry was born. The Derby atmosphere is fierce on and off the pitch, as violence is common between the clubs.

==== Clássico Majestoso ====
Clássico Majestoso is a crosstown fixture between Corinthians and São Paulo. The Derby dates back to 1935, at the final re-founding São Paulo after being thrice defunct. Corinthians possesses the largest number of supporters in the state (25 million), whereas São Paulo's lies in second place (16 Million). The Clássico's most memorable match for Corinthians is the 1990 Campenato Brasileiro finals, which led to Corinthians first national title.

==== Clássico Alvinegro ====
Clássico Alvinegro is a regional fixture between Corinthians and Santos. 'Alvinegro' is given after the colors worn by both teams, black and white (Alvi, from Latin albus, white, and negro, black). The Classico reached one of its highest stages for Corinthians supporters when Corinthians met Santos in the Semi-Finals of Libertadores 2012. Corinthians won 2–1 on aggregate.

==== Other rivalries ====
Derby dos Invictos (Derby of the Undefeated), Corinthians and Portuguesa is a crosstown rivalry. Corinthians vs Ponte Preta is an in-state rivalry that peaked in the 1977 Campeonato Paulista final, which led to Ponte Preta's greatest Paulista Finish (runner-up). Classico das Multidões (Classic of The Masses) is an inter-state rivalry pegging the two most supported teams in Brazil: Corinthians and Flamengo. Corinthians and Vasco led to great match ups and some rivalry recently, mostly after Vasco winning the Campeonato Brasileiro Série A in 1997 and 2000, and Corinthians in 1998 and 1999. Their greatest match coincided with the 2000 FIFA Club World Cup final, with a Corinthians victory in the penalty shootout. Corinthians also won the 2011 Campeonato Brasileiro Série A in the last round of the season, two points over Vasco. Corinthians and Vasco arrived as favorites to win the 2012 Copa Libertadores, but ended up facing each other in the quarterfinals, won by Corinthians and who would eventually win the competition.

=== Symbology ===
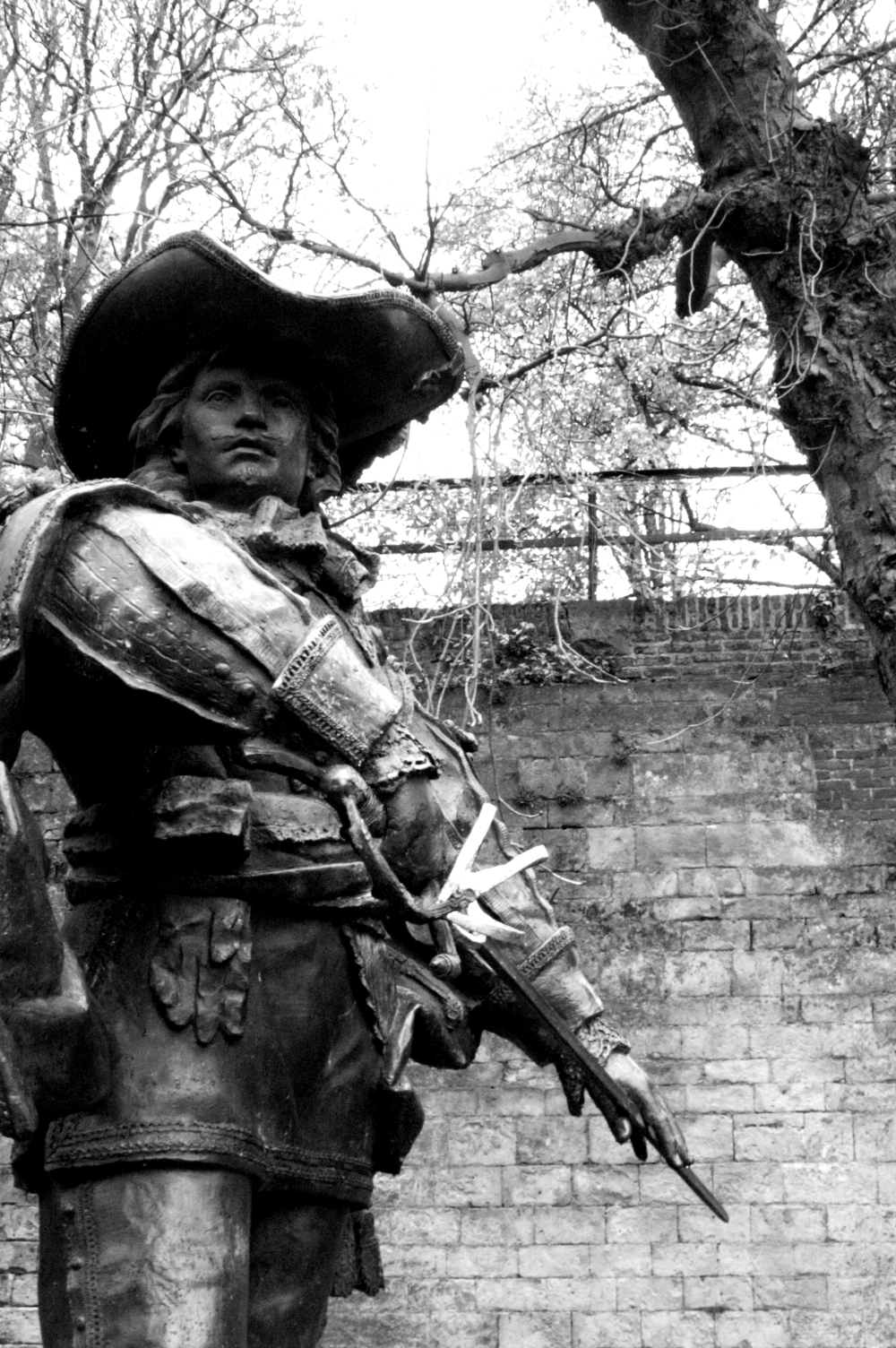
D'Artagnan, Corinthians Mascot

==== Musketeer ====
Corinthians' official mascot is the Musketeer, a symbol of bravery, audacity and fighting spirit. The adoption of that character recalls the first years of the club.

In 1913 most of the leading football clubs in São Paulo State founded the APEA (Paulista Athletic Sports Association). The depleted Paulista League was left with only Americano, Germania and Internacional, known as the "three musketeers" of São Paulo football. Corinthians joined the three as D'Artagnan, being the fourth and most adored musketeer, just like in Alexandre Dumas, père's novel The Three Musketeers. To be accepted in that "musketeers universe", Corinthians had to show their bravery. As there were many other teams who coveted the spot in the Liga Paulista, Corinthians participated in a selective tournament against Minas Gerais and São Paulo, two other great teams of Paulista amateur football at that time. The Corinthian team beat Minas 1–0 and São Paulo 4–0, earning acceptance into the group and acquiring the right to participate in the Special Division of the Paulista League in the following year.

==== Saint George ====
An important symbol for Corinthians is Saint George/(Ogum). Saint George is one of the most revered Catholic saints in Brazil, a nation with a blend of cultures. The collusion between African & European cultures is seen in Brazil's definition of São Jorge as a mash between Catholicism & West African mythology.

Corinthians began as a small team for the lower classes of São Paulo, even though they obtained initial success. Lack of respect for the working class forced Corinthians to leave their São Paulo State Football League in protest. After multiple championships, Timão made its largest leap in prestige in the founding of a Corinthians' Headquarters, 1926. The creation of said headquarters became the first fusion of Timão & São Jorge. The land purchased for the headquarters was formerly Parque São Jorge (St. George Park) at 777 Rua São Jorge, Tatuapé, São Paulo, SP.

Corinthians support for São Jorge became fanatical during the decade of the 60's, Between 1954 and 1977, Corinthians failed to add to its gallery of conquests and the Corinthian Nation lived the hardest moments of its history. While the stream struggled in the 60's, fan recanted that they were blessed by a "Santo Guerreiro" (Warrior Saint). In the early 60's, the lack of success lingered in the minds of fans & gave birth to a utilization of the blessings of São Jorge. this caused Corinthians to erect a chapel in honor of the saint, in order to strengthen the clubs resolve via mysticism. In 1969, after the death of two players Lidu & Eduardo, the funeral was held in Capela São Jorge, & strengthened the clubs identity at a time when championships were non-existent. In the 1974 Paulista Final, after a heart-wrenching loss to arch-rival Palmeiras, composer Paulinho Nogueira recorded "Oh Corinthians", a song that had popular commercial success at the time. In the verses of the composition dedicated to the suffering, Corinthians could not miss the quote of St. George:

"...Oh, são 20 anos de espera. Mas meu São Jorge me dê forças, para poder um dia enfim, descontar meu sofrimento em quem riu de mim".
("... Oh, It's been 20 years of waiting, but my St. George gives me strength to be able to one day finally cashing in my suffering upon those who laughed at me.)"

Corinthians' 2011 third kit was burgundy colored & featured São Jorge slaughtering a dragon in a dark watermark across the right side of the chest. The utilization of São Jorge's image on the shirt is the practice of São Jorge's Prayer.

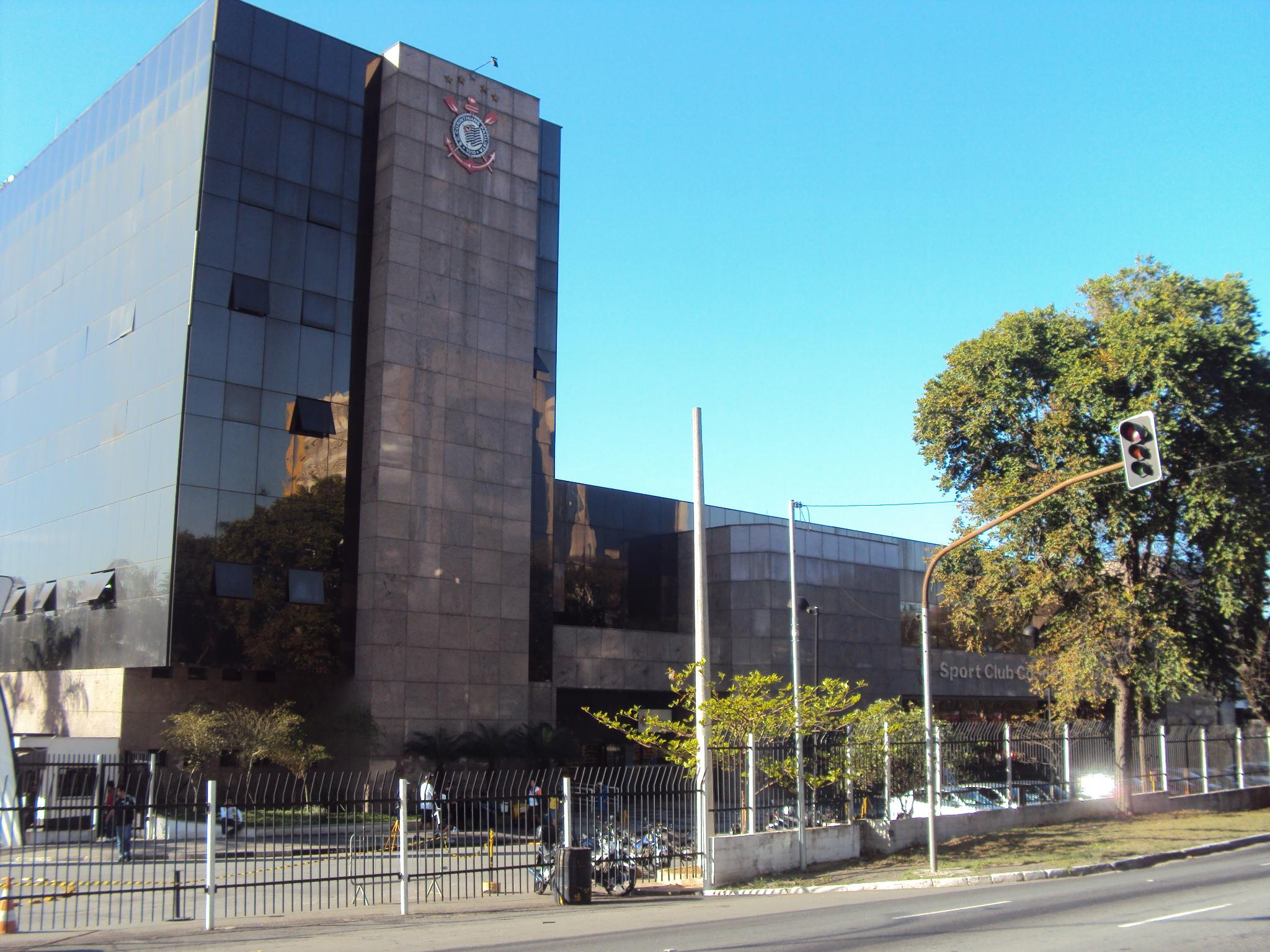
Corinthians Headquarters, located at 777 Rua São Jorge (Parque São Jorge), Tatuapé, São Paulo

== Board of directors ==
=== Current administration ===
Board of Directors
Country	Name	Position
(Brazil)	Osmar Stabile	President
(Brazil)	Armando José Terreri Rossi Mendonça	Vice-president
(Brazil)	Wesley Melo	Financial Director
(Brazil)	José Colagrossi Neto	Marketing Director
(Brazil)	Herói Vicente	Legal Director

=== List of presidents ===
Name	Tenure
(Brazil) Miguel Battaglia	1910
(Brazil) Alexandre Magnani	1910–14
(Brazil) Ricardo de Oliveira	1915
(Brazil) João Baptista Maurício	1915–16
(Brazil) João Martins de Oliveira	1917
(Brazil) João de Carvalho (Interim)	1918
(Brazil) Albino Teixeira Pinheiro	1919
(Brazil) Guido Giacominelli	1920–25, 1927
(Brazil) Aristides de Macedo Filho	1925
(Brazil) Ernesto Cassano	1926, 1928
(Brazil) José Tipaldi	1929
(Brazil) Filipe Collona	1929–30
(Brazil) Alfredo Schürig	1930–33
(Brazil) João Baptista Maurício	1933
(Brazil) José Martins Costa Júnior	1933–34
(Brazil) Manuel Correcher	1935–41
(Brazil) Mario Henrique Almeida (Interim)	1941
(Brazil) Pedro de Souza	1941
(Brazil) Manuel Domingos Correia	1941–43
(Brazil) Alfredo Ignácio Trindade	1944–46
(Brazil) Lourenço Fló Junior	1947–48
(Brazil) Alfredo Ignacio Trindade	1948–59
(Brazil) Vicente Matheus	1959–61
(Brazil) Wadih Helu	1961–71
(Brazil) Miguel Martinez	1971–72
(Brazil) Vicente Matheus	1972–81
(Brazil) Waldemar Pires	1982–85
(Brazil) Roberto Pasqua	1985–87
(Brazil) Vicente Matheus	1987–91
(Brazil) Marlene Matheus	1991–93
(Brazil) Alberto Dualib	1993–07
(Brazil) Clodomil Antonio Orsi (Interim)	2007
(Brazil) Andrés Sanchez	2007–11
(Brazil) Mário Gobbi	2012–15
(Brazil) Roberto de Andrade	2015–18
(Brazil) Andrés Sanchez	2018–21
(Brazil) Duílio Monteiro Alves	2021–23
(Brazil) Augusto Melo	2024–25
(Brazil) Osmar Stabile (Interim)	2025
(Brazil) Osmar Stabile	2025–

== Players and staff ==
=== First-team squad ===
As of 13 September 2026

Note: Flags indicate national team as defined under FIFA eligibility rules; some limited exceptions apply. Players may hold more than one non-FIFA nationality.

No.	Pos.	Nation	Player
1	GK	BRA	Hugo Souza
2	DF	BRA	Matheuzinho
3	DF	BRA	Gabriel Paulista
4	DF	BRA	João Pedro
5	DF	BRA	André Ramalho
7	MF	BRA	Breno Bidon
8	MF	ARG	Rodrigo Garro (captain)
9	FW	BRA	Yuri Alberto
10	FW	NED	Memphis Depay
11	MF	BRA	Vitinho
13	DF	BRA	Gustavo Henrique (vice-captain)
14	MF	BRA	Raniele
18	FW	BRA	Pedro Raul
19	MF	PER	André Carrillo
20	DF	URU	Pedro Milans
21	DF	BRA	Matheus Bidu
23	MF	BRA	Matheus Pereira (on loan from Fortaleza)

No.	Pos.	Nation	Player
26	DF	ARG	Fabrizio Angileri
29	MF	BRA	Allan (on loan from Flamengo)
31	FW	BRA	Kayke
35	MF	BRA	Charles
37	FW	BRA	Kaio César (on loan from Al-Hilal)
40	GK	BRA	Felipe Longo
46	DF	BRA	Hugo Farias
49	MF	BRA	André
51	GK	BRA	Kauê
52	MF	MAR	Zakaria Labyad
54	MF	BRA	Luiz Gustavo
55	DF	BRA	Iago Machado
56	FW	BRA	Gui Negão
61	FW	BRA	Dieguinho
77	MF	ENG	Jesse Lingard
80	MF	BRA	Alex Santana

=== Academy ===
Note: Flags indicate national team as defined under FIFA eligibility rules; some limited exceptions apply. Players may hold more than one non-FIFA nationality.

No.	Pos.	Nation	Player
42	DF	BRA	Guilherme Pellegrin
48	MF	BRA	Gui Amorim
59	DF	BRA	Jacaré
—	FW	BRA	Nícollas
—	GK	BRA	Gustavo Milani
—	GK	BRA	Matheus Corrêa
—	DF	BRA	Levy Dias
—	DF	BRA	Yago Melo

No.	Pos.	Nation	Player
—	DF	BRA	Joãozinho
—	MF	BRA	Christian
—	MF	BRA	Caraguá
—	MF	BRA	Pedro Thomas
—	FW	BRA	Luiz Fernando
—	FW	BRA	Nicolas Araújo
—	FW	BRA	Kayque Dallaqua
—	MF	BRA	Lucca Caramico
—	MF	BRA	Léo Rodrigues

=== Out on loan ===
Note: Flags indicate national team as defined under FIFA eligibility rules; some limited exceptions apply. Players may hold more than one non-FIFA nationality.

No.	Pos.	Nation	Player
—	GK	BRA	Matheus Donelli (on loan to Shabab Al-Ahli until 31 December 2026)
—	DF	BRA	Cacá (on loan to Vitória until 31 December 2026)
—	DF	ECU	Félix Torres (on loan to Internacional until 31 December 2026)
—	DF	ECU	Diego Palacios (on loan to Universidad Católica until 31 December 2026)

No.	Pos.	Nation	Player
—	MF	BRA	Ryan (on loan to Fortaleza until 31 December 2026)
—	MF	BRA	Luiz Eduardo (on loan to Santos until 31 August 2027)
—	DF	BRA	Lucas Molina (on loan to Avaí until 31 August 2027)
—	FW	BRA	Favela (on loan to Żabbar St until 30 June 2027)

=== Technical staff ===
Coaching Staff		
Name		Position
(Netherlands)	Clarence Seedorf	Head coach
(Spain)	Pablo López	Assistant coach
(Brazil)	Leonardo Porto	Assistant coach
(Brazil)	Raony Thadeu	Match analyst
(Brazil)	Leandro Serafim da Silva	Fitness coach
(Brazil)	Marcelo Carpes	Goalkeeping coach

Management Staff		
Name		Position
(Brazil)	Mauro da Silva	Technical Supervisor
(Brazil)	André Figueiredo	Academy Manager

== Honours ==
=== Official tournaments ===
Worldwide
Competitions	Titles	Seasons
FIFA Club World Cup	2	2000, 2012
Continental
Competitions	Titles	Seasons
Copa Libertadores	1	2012
Recopa Sudamericana	1	2013
National
Competitions	Titles	Seasons
Campeonato Brasileiro Série A	7	1990, 1998, 1999, 2005, 2011, 2015, 2017
Copa do Brasil	4	1995, 2002, 2009, 2025
Supercopa do Brasil	2	1991, 2026
Campeonato Brasileiro Série B	1	2008
Inter-state
Competitions	Titles	Seasons
Torneio Rio-São Paulo	5^{s}	1950, 1953, 1954, 1966, 2002
State
Competitions	Titles	Seasons
Campeonato Paulista	31	1914, 1916, 1922, 1923, 1924, 1928, 1929, 1930, 1937, 1938, 1939, 1941, 1951, 1952, 1954, 1977, 1979, 1982, 1983, 1988, 1995, 1997, 1999, 2001, 2003, 2009, 2013, 2017, 2018, 2019, 2025
Copa Paulista	1	1962

- record
- ^{s} shared record

=== Others tournaments ===
==== International ====
- Small Club World Cup (1): 1953
- Torneio Internacional Charles Miller (1): 1955
- Copa do Atlântico (1): 1956
- City of Turin Cup (1): 1966
- Apollo V Trophy (1): 1969
- Trofeo Costa del Sol (1): 1969
- Copa Cidade de São Paulo (1): 1975
- Hidalgo Fair Trophy (1): 1981
- Los Angeles Nations Cup (1): 1985
- Torneio Internacional de Verão Cidade de Santos (2): 1986, 1987
- Ramón de Carranza Trophy (1): 1996
- Troféu Sócrates (1): 2015

==== National and Inter-state ====
- Char de la Victoire e Taça Vada (1): 1928
- Taça Apea (1): 1930
- Taça dos Campeões Estaduais Rio–São Paulo (2): 1929, 1941
- Taça Aliança da Bahia (1): 1936
- Taça Prefeitura de Salvador (1): 1936
- Taça Linha Circular (1): 1938
- Taça Supremacia/Torneio Quinela de Ouro (1): 1942
- Taça o Mais Querido do Brasil (1): 1955
- Torneio de Brasília (1): 1958
- Pentagonal do Recife (1): 1965
- Triangular de Goiânia (1): 1967
- Torneio do Povo (1): 1971
- Torneio Cidade de Porto Alegre (1): 1983
- Troféu Osmar Santos (4): 2005, 2011, 2015, 2017
- Taça Jackson Nascimento (1): 2014
- Troféu João Saldanha (2): 2014, 2015
- Troféu Palhinha (1): 2018

==== State ====
- Taça Competência (3): 1922, 1923, 1924
- Taça Cidade de São Paulo (5): 1942, 1943, 1947, 1948, 1952
- Torneio das Missões (1): 1953
- Taça Charles Miller (2): 1954, 1958
- Taça Piratininga (1): 1968
- Torneio Laudo Natel (1): 1973
- Copa Bandeirantes (1): 1994
- Torneio Início (9): 1919, 1920, 1921, 1929, 1936, 1938, 1941, 1944, 1955

=== Runners-up ===
- Copa Rio (1): 1952
- Campeonato Brasileiro Série A (3): 1976, 1994, 2002
- Copa do Brasil (4): 2001, 2008, 2018, 2022
- Torneio Rio–São Paulo (3): 1951, 1963, 1993
- Campeonato Paulista (21): 1918, 1925, 1936, 1942, 1943, 1945, 1946, 1947, 1955, 1962, 1966, 1968, 1974, 1984, 1987, 1991, 1993, 1998, 2005, 2011, 2020
- Campeonato Paulista Extra (1): 1938

=== Youth team ===
- Campeonato Brasileiro Sub-17 (1): 2026
- Copa do Brasil Sub-17 (1): 2016
- Copa São Paulo de Futebol Júnior (11): 1969, 1970, 1995, 1999, 2004, 2005, 2009, 2012, 2015, 2017, 2024
- Taça Belo Horizonte de Juniores (1): 2015
- Copa Rio Grande do Sul de Futebol Sub-20 (1): 2014
- Copa Votorantim Sub-15 (4): 2003, 2004, 2022, 2025

=== Awards ===
- Fita Azul (1): 1952

Fita Azul do Futebol Brasileiro (Brazilian Football Blue Ribbon) was an award given for the club which succeeds in an excursion out of the country.

== Statistics ==
Last Ten Seasons
Year	Campeonato Brasileiro								Copa do Brasil	Continental/Worldwide				Campeonato Paulista		
—	Div	Pos	G	W	D	L	GF	GA	Maximum stage	Competition		Maximum stage		Div.	Maximum stage	Pos.
2015	A	1st	38	24	9	5	71	31	Round of 16	CL		Round of 16		A1	Semi-finals	3rd
2016	A	7th	38	15	10	13	48	42	Quarter-finals	CL		Round of 16		A1	Semi-finals	3rd
2017	A	1st	38	21	9	8	50	30	Fourth Round	SA		Round of 16		A1	Final	1st
2018	A	13th	38	11	11	16	34	35	Final	CL		Round of 16		A1	Final	1st
2019	A	8th	38	14	14	10	42	34	Round of 16	SA		Semi-finals		A1	Final	1st
2020	A	12th	38	13	12	13	45	45	Round of 16	CL		Second stage		A1	Final	2nd
2021	A	5th	38	15	12	11	40	36	Third Round	SA		Group stage		A1	Semi-finals	3rd
2022	A	4th	38	18	11	9	44	36	Final	CL		Quarter-finals		A1	Semi-finals	3rd
2023	A	13th	38	12	14	12	47	48	Semi-finals	CL	SA	Group stage	Semi-finals	A1	Quarter-finals	7th
2024	A	7th	38	15	11	12	54	45	Semi-finals	SA		Semi-finals		A1	Group Stage	11th
2025	A	13th	38	12	11	15	42	47	Final	CL	SA	Third stage	Group stage	A1	Final	1st

Legend:
Champion. Runner-Up.	Classified for Copa Libertadores da América via Campeonato Brasileiro Campaign. Classified for Copa Libertadores da América via Copa do Brasil or Copa Libertadores Title. Classified for Copa Sul-Americana.

== See also ==
- SC Corinthians Paulista (women)
- SC Corinthians Paulista (youth)
- SC Corinthians Paulista (futsal)
- SC Corinthians Paulista (beach soccer)
- SC Corinthians Paulista (basketball)
- Corinthians Steamrollers (American football)
- SC Corinthians Paulista (Superleague Formula team)
- List of SC Corinthians Paulista records and statistics
- List of world champion football clubs
