= Rio de Janeiro state football team results (1951–2010) =

This is a list of results for all the matches played from 1951 to 2010 by the Rio de Janeiro state football team.

15 Nov 1951 Friendly	Rio de Janeiro	1–2	(Brazil) Botafogo	Rio de Janeiro
	Maxwell		Ariosto; Jarbas	Stadium: Estádio do Maracanã; Referee: Mario Vianna

25 May 1952 Brasileiro de Seleções	Minas Gerais	0–2	Rio de Janeiro	Belo Horizonte
			Telê 67', 86'	Stadium: Estádio Independência; Referee: Mario Vianna

28 May 1952 Brasileiro de Seleções	Rio de Janeiro	3–2	Minas Gerais	Rio de Janeiro
	Ranulfo; Simões		Petrônio; Sabu	Stadium: Estádio do Maracanã; Referee: Geraldo Fernandes

1 Jun 1952 Brasileiro de Seleções	São Paulo (São Paulo (state))	1–1	Rio de Janeiro	São Paulo
	Pinheiro 79' (o.g.)		Telê 6'	Stadium: Estádio do Pacaembu; Referee: Mario Vianna

4 Jun 1952 Brasileiro de Seleções	Rio de Janeiro	0–3	(São Paulo (state)) São Paulo	Rio de Janeiro
			Pinga 38', 77'; Baltazar 86'	Stadium: Estádio do Maracanã; Referee: Francisco Kohn

8 Jun 1952 Brasileiro de Seleções	Rio de Janeiro	1–1	(São Paulo (state)) São Paulo	Rio de Janeiro
	Ademir 63'		Rodrigues 20'	Stadium: Estádio do Maracanã; Referee: Mario Vianna

18 Dec 1952 Friendly	Rio de Janeiro	2–3	Minas Gerais	Rio de Janeiro
	Joel		Omar; Paulo; Barros	Stadium: Estádio do Maracanã

6 Mar 1955 Friendly	Náutico (Brazil)	2–1	Rio de Janeiro	Recife
	Hamilton		Cido (o.g.)	Stadium: Estádio dos Aflitos; Referee: Alberto da Gama Malcher

8 Mar 1955 Friendly	Pernambuco	2–3	Rio de Janeiro	Recife
	Dario 23'; Hamilton 27'		Garrincha 41'; Leônidas da Selva 48'; Didi 68'	Stadium: Ilha do Retiro; Referee: Mario Vianna

13 Mar 1955 Brasileiro de Seleções	Minas Gerais	0–4	Rio de Janeiro	Belo Horizonte
			Ademir 1', 82'; Nivio 30'; Leônidas da Selva 33'	Stadium: Estádio Independência; Referee: Mario Vianna

23 Mar 1955 Brasileiro de Seleções	Rio de Janeiro	6–1	Minas Gerais	Rio de Janeiro
	Didi 5'; Ademir 15', 26'; Pinga 51', 79'; Garrincha 85'		Sabu 86'	Stadium: Estádio do Maracanã; Referee: Horst Harden

27 Mar 1955 Brasileiro de Seleções	São Paulo (São Paulo (state))	3–1	Rio de Janeiro	São Paulo
	Tite 13'; Luizinho 19'; Julinho Botelho 86'		Índio 22'	Stadium: Estádio do Pacaembu; Referee: Estebán Marino (URU)

31 Mar 1955 Brasileiro de Seleções	Rio de Janeiro	3–4	(São Paulo (state)) São Paulo	Rio de Janeiro
	Dequinha 25'; Garrincha 34'; Rubens 81'		Tite 17'; Jair 55'; Julinho Botelho 59'; Baltazar 80'	Stadium: Estádio do Maracanã; Referee: Estebán Marino (URU)

10 Oct 1956 Friendly	Rio de Janeiro	4–1	Minas Gerais	Rio de Janeiro
	Índio 4', 16'; Tomazinho 82'; Didi 87' (pen.)			Stadium: Estádio do Maracanã; Referee: José Lage

24 Oct 1956 Friendly	Minas Gerais	2–6	Rio de Janeiro	Belo Horizonte
	Nelsinho 52'; Joãozinho 83'		Waldo 8', 56'; Didi 10'; Garrincha 19', 21'; Evaristo 72'	Stadium: Estádio Independência; Referee: Frederico Lopes

5 Dec 1956 Copa Raúl Colombo	Rio de Janeiro	1–2	Argentina	Rio de Janeiro
	Índio 15'		Sanfilippo 69'; Garabal 70'	Stadium: Estádio do Maracanã; Referee: Estebán Marino (URU)

6 Jan 1957 Friendly	Bahia	0–0	Rio de Janeiro	Salvador
				Stadium: Fonte Nova; Referee: José Peixoto Nova

9 Jan 1957 Friendly	Pernambuco	1–1	Rio de Janeiro	Recife
	Traçaia 77'		Índio 43'	Stadium: Ilha do Retiro; Referee: Horst Harden

13 Jan 1957 Brasileiro de Seleções	Pará	0–3	Rio de Janeiro	Belém
			Índio 4'; Vavá 7'; Didi 65'	Stadium: Estádio Francisco Vasques; Referee: Alberto da Gama Malcher

20 Jan 1957 Brasileiro de Seleções	Rio de Janeiro	6–0	Pará	Rio de Janeiro
	Pinga 37'; Vavá 47', 73'; Índio 49', 77'; Didi 66'			Stadium: Estádio do Maracanã; Referee: Alberto da Gama Malcher

3 Feb 1957 Brasileiro de Seleções	Pernambuco	0–0	Rio de Janeiro	Recife
				Stadium: Ilha do Retiro; Referee: Guálter Gama de Castro

7 Feb 1957 Brasileiro de Seleções	Minas Gerais	2–2	Rio de Janeiro	Belo Horizonte
	Miguel 58'; Gunga 67'		Waldo 14', 39'	Stadium: Estádio Independência; Referee: Argemiro Félix

10 Feb 1957 Brasileiro de Seleções	Rio de Janeiro	4–0	(São Paulo (state)) São Paulo	Rio de Janeiro
	Índio 8', 18', 84'; Joel 57'			Stadium: Estádio do Maracanã; Referee: Antônio Muzitano

13 Feb 1957 Brasileiro de Seleções	Rio de Janeiro	4–0	Pernambuco	Rio de Janeiro
	Waldo 14', 85'; Joel 28'; Índio 75'			Stadium: Estádio do Maracanã; Referee: Horst Harden

17 Feb 1957 Brasileiro de Seleções	Rio de Janeiro	2–2	Minas Gerais	Rio de Janeiro
	Pinga 15'; Joel 31'		Gunga 5', 21'	Stadium: Estádio do Maracanã; Referee: José Peixoto Nova

20 Feb 1957 Brasileiro de Seleções	São Paulo (São Paulo (state))	2–0	Rio de Janeiro	São Paulo
	Pagão 12'; Zito 60'			Stadium: Estádio do Pacaembu; Referee: Alberto da Gama Malcher

7 Nov 1957 International	Argentina	2–2	Rio de Janeiro	Buenos Aires, Argentina
	Corbatta 8'; Zárate 31'		Ubaldo 50'; Zizinho 63'	Stadium: Estadio Tomás Adolfo Ducó; Referee: Ronald Lynch (ING)

22 Feb 1959 Friendly	Rio de Janeiro	5–1	(São Paulo (state)) São Paulo	Rio de Janeiro
	Pinga 8', 10'; Almir Pernambuquinho 26'; Frade 74', 79'		Pelé 32'	Stadium: Estádio do Maracanã; Referee: Alberto da Gama Malcher

25 Feb 1959 Friendly	São Paulo (São Paulo (state))	0–1	Rio de Janeiro	São Paulo
			Frade 34'	Stadium: Parque Antártica; Referee: João Etzel Filho

16 Dec 1959 Friendly	Rio de Janeiro	6–1	(Argentina) River Plate	Rio de Janeiro
	Quarentinha 10', 50'; Almir Pernambuquinho 33', 56'; Garrincha 58', 72'		Menéndez 22'	Stadium: Estádio do Maracanã; Referee: Alberto da Gama Malcher

10 Jan 1960 Friendly	Flamengo (Brazil)	0–3	Rio de Janeiro	Rio de Janeiro
			Germano 32'; Sabará 36'; Frade 42'	Stadium: Estádio da Gávea; Referee: Amílcar Ferreira

13 Jan 1960 Friendly	Vasco da Gama (Brazil)	2–2	Rio de Janeiro	Rio de Janeiro
	Teotonio 11'; Cabrita 82'		Babá 23'; Sabará 52'	Stadium: São Januário; Referee: Eunápio de Queiróz

16 Jan 1960 Friendly	Coritiba (Brazil)	2–3	Rio de Janeiro	Curitiba
	Ivo 21'; Duílio 28'		Bequinha 24' (o.g.); Pinga 25'; Babá 67'	Stadium: Belford Duarte; Referee: Osvaldo Vilela

20 Jan 1960 Brasileiro de Seleções	Rio Grande do Norte	2–4	Rio de Janeiro	Natal
	Saquinho 6'; Cocó 5'		Pinga 17', 31', 36'; Babá 51'	Stadium: Juvenal Lamartine; Referee: João Etzel Filho

24 Jan 1960 Brasileiro de Seleções	Rio Grande do Norte	1–1	Rio de Janeiro	Natal
	Russo 17' (o.g.)		Rossi 22'	Stadium: Juvenal Lamartine; Referee: João Etzel Filho

27 Jan 1960 Brasileiro de Seleções	Pernambuco	3–2	Rio de Janeiro	Recife
	Osvaldo 5'; Traçaia 79', 81'		Pinga 27'; Almir Pernambuquinho 70'	Stadium: Ilha do Retiro; Referee: Antônio Viug

31 Jan 1960 Brasileiro de Seleções	Rio de Janeiro	6–0	Minas Gerais	Rio de Janeiro
	Pinga 19'; Almir Pernambuquinho 22', 48'; Babá 31'; Djalma 45' (o.g.); Décio Esteves 85'			Stadium: Estádio do Maracanã; Referee: Artur Vilarinho

3 Feb 1960 Brasileiro de Seleções	São Paulo (São Paulo (state))	4–1	Rio de Janeiro	São Paulo
	Pepe 21', 38' (pen.); Servílio 50', 73'		Zé Carlos 58' (o.g.)	Stadium: Estádio do Pacaembu; Referee: Alberto da Gama Malcher

7 Feb 1960 Brasileiro de Seleções	Rio de Janeiro	3–1	Pernambuco	Rio de Janeiro
	Sabará 18'; Dida 46', 83'		Traçaia 33'	Stadium: Estádio do Maracanã; Referee: Anísio Morgado

10 Feb 1960 Brasileiro de Seleções	Minas Gerais	1–8	Rio de Janeiro	Juiz de Fora
	Ipojucan 6'		Dida 2', 26', 47'; Frade 23', 52'; Décio Esteves 30'; Pinga 78'; Joel 79'	Referee: Willer Costa

14 Feb 1960 Brasileiro de Seleções	Rio de Janeiro	1–2	(São Paulo (state)) São Paulo	Rio de Janeiro
	Décio Esteves 79'		Russo 9' (o.g.); Servílio 25'	Stadium: Estádio do Maracanã; Referee: João Laurito

21 Feb 1960 International	Peru	1–5	Rio de Janeiro	Lima, Peru
	De la Vega 39'		Rossi 13', 58'; Décio Esteves 23'; Fernández 74' (o.g.); Babá 76'	Stadium: Estadio Nacional; Referee: Arturo Yamasaki (PER)

19 Dec 1961 Friendly	São Paulo (São Paulo (state))	4–1	Rio de Janeiro	São Paulo
	Pelé 34'; Toninho Guerreiro 49', 72'; Chinesinho 60'		Amarildo 58'	Stadium: Estádio do Pacaembu; Referee: Olten Ayres de Abreu

19 Dec 1962 Friendly	Rio de Janeiro	6–4	(São Paulo (state)) São Paulo	Rio de Janeiro
	Zagallo 20'; Quarentinha 27'; Garrincha 47'; Nilo 59'; João Carlos 73'; Foguete 86'		Pelé 15', 55' (pen.); Benê 32'; Batista 51'	Stadium: Estádio do Maracanã; Attendance: 20.171; Referee: Armando Marques

12 Jan 1963 Friendly	Rio de Janeiro	2–0	(Brazil) São Cristóvão	Rio de Janeiro
	Gérson 31'; Foguete 69'			Stadium: General Severiano; Referee: José Monteiro

16 Jan 1963 Friendly	Rio de Janeiro	6–1	(Brazil) Portuguesa-RJ	Rio de Janeiro
	Correia 2'; Gérson 19', 29'; Nélson 60'; Nilo 61'; Foguete 77'		Mauro 87'	Stadium: General Severiano; Referee: Nivaldo dos Santos

20 Jan 1963 Brasileiro de Seleções	Rio de Janeiro	5–1	Ceará	Rio de Janeiro
	Dida 10', 74'; Gérson 33' (pen.), 36', 83'		Gildo 31'	Stadium: Estádio do Maracanã; Attendance: 31.628; Referee: João Etzel Filho

23 Jan 1963 Brasileiro de Seleções	Ceará	0–0	Rio de Janeiro	Fortaleza
				Stadium: Presidente Vargas; Referee: Armando Marques

27 Jan 1963 Brasileiro de Seleções	Minas Gerais	1–0	Rio de Janeiro	Belo Horizonte
	Ari 27'			Stadium: Estádio Independência; Attendance: 33.721; Referee: Armando Marques

30 Jan 1963 Brasileiro de Seleções	Rio de Janeiro	1–2	Minas Gerais	Rio de Janeiro
	Dida 5'		Luís Carlos 11'; Marco Antônio 80'	Stadium: Estádio do Maracanã; Referee: Joaquim Gonçalves

19 Dec 1964 Friendly	Rio de Janeiro	2–4	(São Paulo (state)) São Paulo	Rio de Janeiro
	Zezinho 7'; Cunha 30' (o.g.)		Ivair 14', 44'; Servílio 53'; Nair 62' (pen.)	Stadium: Estádio do Maracanã; Attendance: 52.508; Referee: Eduardo Menezes

23 Dec 1966 Friendly	Minas Gerais	2–1	Rio de Janeiro	Belo Horizonte
	Zé Carlos; Roberto Mauro		Almir Pernambuquinho	Stadium: Estádio Independência

23 Dec 1966 Friendly	Minas Gerais	2–2	Rio de Janeiro	Belo Horizonte
	Tostão 2'; Evaldo 21'		Roberto Miranda 26'; Paulo Borges 45'	Stadium: Mineirão; Referee: Armando Marques

26 Sep 1967 Friendly	Rio de Janeiro	1–1	(São Paulo (state)) São Paulo	Rio de Janeiro
	Paulo Borges 60'		Edu 15'	Stadium: Estádio do Maracanã; Attendance: 66.788; Referee: Aírton Vieira de Moraes

10 Nov 1968 Friendly	Rio de Janeiro	2–3	(São Paulo (state)) São Paulo	Rio de Janeiro
	Roberto Miranda 43'; Paulo Cesar 89'		Toninho Guerreiro 5'; Pelé 40'; Carlos Alberto 65' (pen.)	Stadium: Estádio do Maracanã; Attendance: 85.187; Referee: Armando Marques

14 Dec 1969 Torneio Garrastazu Médici	Minas Gerais	4–0	Rio de Janeiro	Belo Horizonte
	Dadá Maravilha 12', 33', 57'; Marco Antônio 29' (o.g.)			Stadium: Mineirão; Referee: Armando Marques

21 Dec 1969 Torneio Garrastazu Médici	Rio de Janeiro	0–0	(São Paulo (state)) São Paulo	Rio de Janeiro
				Stadium: Estádio do Maracanã; Referee: Armando Marques

16 Jun 1970 Friendly	Rio de Janeiro	0–1	(Brazil) Flamengo	Rio de Janeiro
			Adãozinho 23'	Stadium: Estádio do Maracanã; Attendance: 13.735; Referee: José Aldo Pereira

3 Jun 1971 Taça Emílio Garrastazu Médici	Minas Gerais	1–1	Rio de Janeiro	Belo Horizonte
	Vaguinho 39'		Jeremias 35'	Stadium: Mineirão; Referee: Armando Marques

14 Jan 1973 Friendly	São Paulo (São Paulo (state))	2–2	Rio de Janeiro	Campinas
	Rivellino 2'; Edu 37'		Tostão 7'; Alcir 25'	Stadium: Estádio Moisés Lucarelli; Attendance: 18.607; Referee: Mílton Jorge

3 Mar 1974 Friendly	São Paulo (São Paulo (state))	2–2	Rio de Janeiro	São Paulo
	César Maluco 12' (pen.); Mirandinha 58' (pen.)		Roberto Dinamite 28'; Manfrini 71' (pen.)	Stadium: Estádio do Morumbi; Attendance: 61.164; Referee: Arnaldo Cézar Coelho

16 Fev 1975 Taça Heleno Nunes	Rio de Janeiro	1–1 (4–1 p)	(São Paulo (state)) São Paulo	Rio de Janeiro
	Mário Sérgio 30'		Terto 37'	Stadium: Estádio do Maracanã; Attendance: 69.867; Referee: Dulcídio Boschilia
	Penalties
	Geraldo (penalty scored); Zico (penalty scored); Zanata (penalty scored); Doval (penalty scored)		Alfredo Mostarda (penalty scored); Luís Pereira (penalty missed); Zé Carlos (penalty missed)

22 Jun 1975 Friendly	Rio de Janeiro	1–1	(São Paulo (state)) São Paulo	Rio de Janeiro
	Dirceu 5'		Chicão 58'	Stadium: Estádio do Maracanã; Attendance: 42.758; Referee: Armando Marques

29 Jun 1975 Taça Gastão Soares de Moura	Rio de Janeiro	3–3 (4–5 p)	Minas Gerais	Rio de Janeiro
	Doval 18'; Dirceu 45'; Nílson Dias 49'		Roberto Batata 11'; Nelinho 34'; Wanderley Paiva 50'	Stadium: Estádio do Maracanã; Attendance: 25.186; Referee: José Favilli Neto
	Penalties
	Dirceu (penalty scored); Orlando (penalty missed); Ivo (penalty scored); Doval (penalty scored); Cafuringa (penalty scored)		Roberto Batata (penalty scored); Darci (penalty scored); Ângelo (penalty scored); Piazza (penalty scored); Morais (penalty scored)

5 Jun 1977 International	Brazil	4–2	(Rio de Janeiro (state)) Rio de Janeiro	Rio de Janeiro
	Gil 13'; Marcelo Oliveira 19'; Roberto Dinamite 39'; Rivellino 44'		Ramón 69', 76'	Stadium: Estádio do Maracanã; Referee: Airton Vieira de Moraes

5 Mar 1981 Taça ACERJ	Rio de Janeiro (Rio de Janeiro (state))	3–3	(São Paulo (state)) São Paulo	Rio de Janeiro
	Luís Pereira 12'; Mário Sérgio 45+1'; Júnior 50'		Toquinho 1'; Sócrates 22'; Jorge Mendonça 67' (pen.)	Stadium: Estádio do Maracanã; Attendance: 23.818; Referee: Arnaldo Cézar Coelho

19 Dec 1982 Friendly	Rio de Janeiro (Rio de Janeiro (state))	4–3	(São Paulo (state)) São Paulo	Rio de Janeiro
	Zico 11', 48' (pen.), 55'; Gilson Gênio 17'		Sócrates 10'; João Paulo 26'; Paulo Egídio 47'	Stadium: Estádio do Maracanã; Attendance: 11.088; Referee: Pedro Bregalda

4 Dec 1987 Brasileiro de Seleções	Maranhão	1–3	(Rio de Janeiro (state)) Rio de Janeiro	São Luís
	Goal		Roberto Dinamite; Romário	Stadium: Castelão

10 Dec 1987 Brasileiro de Seleções	Rio de Janeiro (Rio de Janeiro (state))	4–1	Maranhão	Rio de Janeiro
	Mauricinho 37'; Osvaldo 56'; Romário 61'; Bismarck 79'		Bacalhau	Stadium: São Januário; Referee: Pedro Bregalda

19 Dec 1987 Friendly	America-RJ (Brazil)	6–4	(Rio de Janeiro (state)) Rio de Janeiro	Rio de Janeiro
	Romário; Moreno; Gilson Gênio; Gilcimar		Carlos Alberto; Marinho	Stadium: Estádio Wolney Braune; Referee: Fernando Sampaio

26 Jan 1988 Brasileiro de Seleções	Rio de Janeiro (Rio de Janeiro (state))	0–0	Minas Gerais	Niterói
				Stadium: Estádio Caio Martins; Referee: Antônio de Paula e Silva

2 Feb 1988 Brasileiro de Seleções	Minas Gerais	1–1	Rio de Janeiro	Belo Horizonte
	Zé Carlos		Alex (o.g.)	Stadium: Estádio Independência; Referee: Edmar Soares

4 Fev 1988 Brasileiro de Seleções	Rio de Janeiro (Rio de Janeiro (state))	1–0	(São Paulo (state)) São Paulo	Campos dos Goytacazes
	Amarildo 62'			Stadium: Estádio Godofredo Cruz; Attendance: 10.953; Referee: Ângelo Antônio Ferrari

25 Jan 1990 Friendly	São Paulo (São Paulo (state))	4–1	(Rio de Janeiro (state)) Rio de Janeiro	São Paulo
	Mirandinha 5', 48', 84'; Betinho 40'		Alcindo 70' (pen.)	Stadium: Estádio do Canindé; Attendance: 10.364; Referee: Ulisses Tavares

19 Dec 1990 Friendly	Botafogo (Brazil)	2–2	(Rio de Janeiro (state)) Rio de Janeiro	Niterói
	Bujica 1'; Luisinho 8'		Arturzinho 34'; Edson Souza 53'	Stadium: Estádio Caio Martins; Attendance: 1.218; Referee: Aloísio Viug

12 Sep 1996 Friendly	São Paulo (São Paulo (state))	5–3	(Rio de Janeiro (state)) Rio de Janeiro	Presidente Prudente
	Djalminha 23', 53'; Luizão 44', 86'; Cafu 87'		Túlio 28', 72' (pen.); Edmundo 89' (pen.)	Stadium: Estádio Prudentão; Attendance: 17.662; Referee: Getúlio Barbosa Jr.

25 Sep 1996 Friendly	São Paulo (São Paulo (state))	0–2	(Rio de Janeiro (state)) Rio de Janeiro	Ribeirão Preto
			Luisinho 40'; Edmundo 73'	Stadium: Estádio Santa Cruz; Attendance: 12.599; Referee: Carlos Elias Pimentel

23 Jan 2000 Friendly	America-RJ (Brazil)	3–1	(Rio de Janeiro (state)) Rio de Janeiro	Rio de Janeiro
	Sorato; Luis Gustavo; Alexandre		Renato Gaúcho	Stadium: Estádio Edson Passos; Attendance: 4.000

10 Oct 2004 Friendly	Rio de Janeiro (Rio de Janeiro (state))	1–1	(São Paulo (state)) São Paulo	Rio de Janeiro
	Romário 74'	Report	Anderson Lima 18'	Stadium: Estádio do Maracanã; Attendance: 58.147; Referee: Willian de Souza Nery

23 Jun 2008 International	Brazil U-23	1–0	(Rio de Janeiro (state)) Rio de Janeiro	Volta Redonda
	Alexandre Pato 7'	Report		Stadium: Estádio Raulino de Oliveira; Attendance: 11.503; Referee: Marcelo de Lima Henrique

9 Dec 2010 Copa Inovação	São Paulo (São Paulo (state))	3–1	(Rio de Janeiro (state)) Rio de Janeiro	São Caetano do Sul
	Elano 8' (pen.); Baiano 50'; Neymar 84' (pen.)	Report	Dedé 22'	Stadium: Estádio Anacleto Campanella; Referee: Sálvio Spínola
