= São Paulo state football team results (1951–2010) =

This is a list of results for all the matches played from 1951 to 2010 by the São Paulo state football team.

== Results ==
3 Feb 1952 Brasileiro de Seleções	Rio Grande do Sul	2–3	(São Paulo (state)) São Paulo	Porto Alegre
	Camargo 25'; Bodinho 28'		Pinga 2'; Rodrigues 81', 86'	Stadium: Estádio dos Eucaliptos; Referee: Carlos Monteiro

28 May 1952 Brasileiro de Seleções	São Paulo (São Paulo (state))	5–1	Rio Grande do Sul	São Paulo
	Antoninho 3'; Baltazar 53'; Rodrigues 70', 84' (pen.)		Salvador 28'; Pinga 76'	Stadium: Estádio do Pacaembu; Referee: Mario Vianna

1 Jun 1952 Brasileiro de Seleções	São Paulo (São Paulo (state))	1–1	Rio de Janeiro	São Paulo
	Pinheiro 79' (o.g.)		Telê 6'	Stadium: Estádio do Pacaembu; Referee: Mario Vianna

4 Jun 1952 Brasileiro de Seleções	Rio de Janeiro	0–3	(São Paulo (state)) São Paulo	Rio de Janeiro
			Pinga 38', 77'; Baltazar 86'	Stadium: Estádio do Maracanã; Referee: Francisco Kohn

8 Jun 1952 Brasileiro de Seleções	Rio de Janeiro	1–1	(São Paulo (state)) São Paulo	Rio de Janeiro
	Ademir 63'		Rodrigues 20'	Stadium: Estádio do Maracanã; Referee: Mario Vianna

13 Mar 1955 Brasileiro de Seleções	Rio Grande do Sul	1–1	(São Paulo (state)) São Paulo	Porto Alegre
	Ênio Andrade 39' (pen.)		Humberto Tozzi 18'	Stadium: Olímpico Monumental; Referee: Carlos Monteiro

20 Mar 1955 Brasileiro de Seleções	São Paulo (São Paulo (state))	4–2	Rio Grande do Sul	São Paulo
	Jair 22'; Tite 24'; Humberto Tozzi 20', 88'		Hercilio 15'; Breno 44'	Stadium: Estádio do Pacaembu; Referee: Mario Vianna

27 Mar 1955 Brasileiro de Seleções	São Paulo (São Paulo (state))	3–1	Rio de Janeiro	São Paulo
	Tite 13'; Luizinho 19'; Julinho Botelho 86'		Índio 22'	Stadium: Estádio do Pacaembu; Referee: Estebán Marino (URU)

31 Mar 1955 Brasileiro de Seleções	Rio de Janeiro	3–4	(São Paulo (state)) São Paulo	Rio de Janeiro
	Dequinha 25'; Garrincha 34'; Rubens 81'		Tite 17'; Jair 55'; Julinho Botelho 59'; Baltazar 80'	Stadium: Estádio do Maracanã; Referee: Estebán Marino (URU)

3 Apr 1955 Friendly	São Paulo (São Paulo (state))	1–3	(Brazil) Vasco da Gama	São Paulo
	Alfredinho 7'		Sílvio Parodi 33', 79'; Pinga 35'	Stadium: Estádio do Pacaembu; Referee: Antônio Musitano

23 Aug 1955 Taça General Artigas	Nacional / Peñarol (Uruguay)	0–1	(São Paulo (state)) São Paulo	Montevideo, Uruguay
			Vasconcelos 44'	Stadium: Estadio Centenario; Referee: Erwin Hieger (AUT)

25 Aug 1955 Taça General Artigas	Nacional / Peñarol (Uruguay)	0–1	(São Paulo (state)) São Paulo	Montevideo, Uruguay
			Humberto Tozzi 21'	Stadium: Estadio Centenario; Referee: Estebán Marino (URU)

22 Jan 1956 Friendly	Corinthians (Brazil)	1–2	(São Paulo (state)) São Paulo	São Paulo
	Zezé 24'		Renatinho 10'; Lanzoninho 30'	Stadium: Parque São Jorge; Referee: Antônio Assunção Pereira

27 Jan 1956 Friendly	Santos FC (Brazil)	3–3	(São Paulo (state)) São Paulo	Santos
	Negri 11'; Pagão 49'; Alfredinho 53'		Jansen 21', 71'; Ipojucan 45'	Stadium: Vila Belmiro; Referee: Abílio Ramos

15 Nov 1956 Friendly	Portuguesa (Brazil)	0–1	(São Paulo (state)) São Paulo	São Paulo
			Maurinho 32'	Stadium: Estádio do Canindé; Referee: João Etzel Filho

17 Jan 1957 Brasileiro de Seleções	São Paulo (São Paulo (state))	8–0	(Paraná (state)) Paraná	São Paulo
	Del Vecchio 11', 50', 63', 67'; Tite 52'; Pepe 85', 88'			Stadium: Estádio do Pacaembu; Referee: Geraldo Fernandes

20 Jan 1957 Brasileiro de Seleções	Paraná (Paraná (state))	0–0	(São Paulo (state)) São Paulo	Curitiba
				Stadium: Estádio Durival de Britto; Referee: Fortunato Tonelli

23 Jan 1957 Friendly	São Paulo (São Paulo (state))	3–3	(Brazil) Portuguesa	São Paulo
	Del Vecchio 6'; Dino Sani 52'; Pepe 72' (pen.)		Amaral 17'; Beiço 36' (pen.); Zezinho 68'	Stadium: Estádio do Pacaembu; Referee: João Etzel Filho

28 Jan 1957 Brasileiro de Seleções	São Paulo (São Paulo (state))	2–1	Minas Gerais	São Paulo
	Luizinho 7'; Djalma Santos 36' (pen.)		Dodo 29'	Stadium: Estádio do Pacaembu; Referee: Geraldo Fernandes

6 Feb 1957 Brasileiro de Seleções	Pernambuco	0–2	(São Paulo (state)) São Paulo	Recife
			Dino Sani 1'; Tite 22'	Stadium: Ilha do Retiro; Referee: João Laurito

10 Feb 1957 Brasileiro de Seleções	Rio de Janeiro	4–0	(São Paulo (state)) São Paulo	Rio de Janeiro
	Índio 8', 18', 84'; Joel 57'			Stadium: Estádio do Maracanã; Referee: Antônio Muzitano

13 Feb 1957 Brasileiro de Seleções	Minas Gerais	1–3	(São Paulo (state)) São Paulo	Belo Horizonte
	Afonso 39'		Dino Sani 34'; Tite 72'; Del Vecchio 90'	Stadium: Estádio Independência; Referee: Fortunato Tonelli

17 Feb 1957 Brasileiro de Seleções	São Paulo (São Paulo (state))	3–1	Pernambuco	São Paulo
	Cláudio 6'; Del Vecchio 17'; Dino Sani 84'		Traçaia 2'	Stadium: Estádio do Pacaembu; Referee: Catão Montez Jr.

20 Feb 1957 Brasileiro de Seleções	São Paulo (São Paulo (state))	2–0	Rio de Janeiro	São Paulo
	Pagão 12'; Zito 60'			Stadium: Estádio do Pacaembu; Referee: Alberto da Gama Malcher

12 Jun 1957 International	São Paulo (São Paulo (state))	3–1	Argentina	São Paulo
	Maurinho 2'; Zezinho 14'; Bauer 80'		Héctor Antonio 58'	Stadium: Estádio do Pacaembu; Referee: Bertley Cross (ENG)

12 Feb 1958 Friendly	Campinas XI	2–2	(São Paulo (state)) São Paulo	Campinas
	Esney 72'; Fifi 79'		Ney Blanco 16'; Roberto 42'	Stadium: Estádio Moisés Lucarelli; Referee: Luiz Gonzaga de Souza

30 Dec 1958 Friendly	Santos FC (Brazil)	3–0	(São Paulo (state)) São Paulo	Santos
	Pelé 48', 50'; Dorval 85'			Stadium: Vila Belmiro; Referee: Elias Assad

22 Feb 1959 Friendly	Rio de Janeiro	5–1	(São Paulo (state)) São Paulo	Rio de Janeiro
	Pinga 8', 10'; Almir Pernambuquinho 26'; Frade 74', 79'		Pelé 32'	Stadium: Estádio do Maracanã; Referee: Alberto da Gama Malcher

25 Feb 1959 Friendly	São Paulo (São Paulo (state))	0–1	Rio de Janeiro	São Paulo
			Frade 34'	Stadium: Parque Antártica; Referee: João Etzel Filho

10 Jan 1960 Friendly	Caldense (Brazil)	2–5	(São Paulo (state)) São Paulo	Poços de Caldas
	Marinho 25'; Zacarelli 55'		Buzzone 18', 68'; Servílio 29'; Bazzani 82'	Referee: Olten Ayres de Abreu

19 Jan 1960 Brasileiro de Seleções	Bahia	0–2	(São Paulo (state)) São Paulo	Salvador
			Pepe 84', 89'	Stadium: Fonte Nova; Referee: Eunápio de Queiróz

24 Jan 1960 Brasileiro de Seleções	São Paulo (São Paulo (state))	7–1	Bahia	São Paulo
	Pepe 8', 48', 88'; Pelé 52' (pen.), 76', 84'; Chinesinho 60'		Biriba 69'	Stadium: Estádio do Pacaembu; Referee: Eunápio de Queiróz

27 Jan 1960 Brasileiro de Seleções	Minas Gerais	3–4	(São Paulo (state)) São Paulo	Juiz de Fora
	Ipojuca 15', 77'; Toledinho 65'		Pelé 3'; Lima 7'; Coutinho 19'; Dorval 63'	Referee: Alberto da Gama Malcher

31 Jan 1960 Brasileiro de Seleções	Pernambuco	4–2	(São Paulo (state)) São Paulo	Recife
	Elias 3', 76' (pen.); Geraldo 32'; Paulo 34'		Pepe 58', 63' (pen.)	Stadium: Ilha do Retiro; Referee: Anacleto Pietrobom

3 Feb 1960 Brasileiro de Seleções	São Paulo (São Paulo (state))	4–1	Rio de Janeiro	São Paulo
	Pepe 21', 38' (pen.); Servílio 50', 73'		Zé Carlos 58' (o.g.)	Stadium: Estádio do Pacaembu; Referee: Alberto da Gama Malcher

7 Feb 1960 Brasileiro de Seleções	São Paulo (São Paulo (state))	6–1	Minas Gerais	São Paulo
	Servílio 8', 60'; Bazzani 9'; Pepe 11'; Tite 70', 72'		Isaias 88'	Stadium: Estádio do Pacaembu; Referee: Alberto da Gama Malcher

10 Feb 1960 Brasileiro de Seleções	São Paulo (São Paulo (state))	3–1	Pernambuco	São Paulo
	Pelé 28', 73'; Servílio 72'		Osvaldo 21'	Stadium: Estádio do Pacaembu; Referee: Argemiro Félix

14 Feb 1960 Brasileiro de Seleções	Rio de Janeiro	1–2	(São Paulo (state)) São Paulo	Rio de Janeiro
	Décio Esteves 79'		Russo 9' (o.g.); Servílio 25'	Stadium: Estádio do Maracanã; Referee: João Laurito

19 Dec 1961 Friendly	São Paulo (São Paulo (state))	4–1	Rio de Janeiro	São Paulo
	Pelé 34'; Toninho Guerreiro 49', 72'; Chinesinho 60'		Amarildo 58'	Stadium: Estádio do Pacaembu; Referee: Olten Ayres de Abreu

19 Dec 1962 Friendly	Rio de Janeiro	6–4	(São Paulo (state)) São Paulo	Rio de Janeiro
	Zagallo 20'; Quarentinha 27'; Garrincha 47'; Nilo 59'; João Carlos 73'; Foguete 86'		Pelé 15', 55' (pen.); Benê 32'; Batista 51'	Stadium: Estádio do Maracanã; Attendance: 20.171; Referee: Armando Marques

12 Jan 1963 Friendly	São Paulo (São Paulo (state))	4–0	(Brazil) São Paulo FC	São Paulo
	Davi 16', 48'; Batista 24'; Paulo Bin 81'			Stadium: Estádio do Pacaembu; Referee: João Batista dos Santos

20 Jan 1963 Brasileiro de Seleções	São Paulo (São Paulo (state))	0–3	Minas Gerais	São Paulo
			Marco Antônio 39'; Luis Carlos 75'; Ari 77'	Stadium: Estádio do Pacaembu; Referee: Joaquim Gonçalves

23 Jan 1963 Brasileiro de Seleções	Minas Gerais	1–1	(São Paulo (state)) São Paulo	Belo Horizonte
	Ari 25'		Davi 1'	Stadium: Estádio Independência; Referee: Romualdo Arppi Filho

19 Dec 1964 Friendly	Rio de Janeiro	2–4	(São Paulo (state)) São Paulo	Rio de Janeiro
	Zezinho 7'; Cunha 30' (o.g.)		Ivair 14', 44'; Servílio 53'; Nair 62' (pen.)	Stadium: Estádio do Maracanã; Attendance: 52.508; Referee: Eduardo Menezes

1 May 1966 Friendly	Coritiba (Brazil)	0–2	(São Paulo (state)) São Paulo	Curitiba
			Tupãzinho 24'; Prado 57'	Stadium: Couto Pereira; Attendance: 26.930; Referee: Romualdo Arppi Filho

5 May 1966 Friendly	Guarani / Ponte Preta (Brazil)	1–0	(São Paulo (state)) São Paulo	Campinas
	Nelsinho 58'			Stadium: Estádio Brinco de Ouro; Attendance: 8.177; Referee: Armando Marques

11 May 1966 Friendly	Distrito Federal (Federal District (Brazil))	0–8	(São Paulo (state)) São Paulo	Brasília
			Babá 18', 20', 34'; Coutinho 25'; Pepe 48', 65'; Tupãzinho 53' (pen.); Ademar Pantera 84'	Stadium: Defelê; Referee: Olten Ayres de Abreu

15 May 1966 Friendly	Goiás	0–3	(São Paulo (state)) São Paulo	Goiânia
			Babá 5', 86'; Tupãzinho 9' (pen.)	Stadium: Estádio Olímpico Pedro Ludovico; Referee: Olten Ayres de Abreu

22 May 1966 Friendly	São Paulo (São Paulo (state))	3–1	(Portugal) Belenenses	São Paulo
	Tupãzinho 17', 71'; Renato 78'		Pedras 44'	Stadium: Estádio do Pacaembu; Referee: Armando Marques

23 Sep 1967 Friendly	Minas Gerais	2–3	(São Paulo (state)) São Paulo	Belo Horizonte
	Zé Carlos 12', 81'		Toninho Guerreiro 25'; Rivellino 32'; Flávio Minuano 59'	Stadium: Mineirão; Referee: Frederico Lopes

26 Sep 1967 Friendly	Rio de Janeiro	1–1	(São Paulo (state)) São Paulo	Rio de Janeiro
	Paulo Borges 60'		Edu 15'	Stadium: Estádio do Maracanã; Attendance: 66.788; Referee: Aírton Vieira

10 Nov 1968 Friendly	Rio de Janeiro	2–3	(São Paulo (state)) São Paulo	Rio de Janeiro
	Roberto Miranda 43'; Paulo Cesar 89'		Toninho Guerreiro 5'; Pelé 40'; Carlos Alberto 65' (pen.)	Stadium: Estádio do Maracanã; Attendance: 85.187; Referee: Armando Marques

14 Dec 1969 Friendly	Bahia	1–2	(São Paulo (state)) São Paulo	Salvador
	Carlinhos 46'		Ivair 42'; Leivinha 78'	Stadium: Fonte Nova; Referee: Romualdo Arppi Filho

17 Dec 1969 Torneio Garrastazu Médici	São Paulo (São Paulo (state))	2–1	Minas Gerais	São Paulo
	Pelé 52'; Ivair 66'		Dadá Maravilha 40'	Stadium: Parque Antártica; Referee: Armando Marques

21 Dec 1969 Torneio Garrastazu Médici	Rio de Janeiro	0–0	(São Paulo (state)) São Paulo	Rio de Janeiro
				Stadium: Estádio do Maracanã; Referee: Armando Marques

14 Jan 1973 Friendly	São Paulo (São Paulo (state))	2–2	Rio de Janeiro	Campinas
	Rivellino 2'; Edu 37'		Tostão 7'; Alcir 25'	Stadium: Estádio Moisés Lucarelli; Attendance: 18.607; Referee: Mílton Jorge

3 Mar 1974 Friendly	São Paulo (São Paulo (state))	2–2	Rio de Janeiro	São Paulo
	César Maluco 12' (pen.); Mirandinha 58' (pen.)		Roberto Dinamite 28'; Manfrini 71' (pen.)	Stadium: Estádio do Morumbi; Attendance: 61.164; Referee: Arnaldo Cézar Coelho

16 Fev 1975 Taça Heleno Nunes	Rio de Janeiro	1–1 (4–1 p)	(São Paulo (state)) São Paulo	Rio de Janeiro
	Mário Sérgio 30'		Terto 37'	Stadium: Estádio do Maracanã; Attendance: 69.867; Referee: Dulcídio Boschilia
	Penalties
	Geraldo (penalty scored); Zico (penalty scored); Zanata (penalty scored); Doval (penalty scored)		Alfredo Mostarda (penalty scored); Luís Pereira (penalty missed); Zé Carlos (penalty missed)

18 Jun 1975 Friendly	São Paulo (São Paulo (state))	3–0	(Portugal) FC Porto	São Paulo
	Leivinha 8'; Chicão 23'; Gilberto Sorriso 34'			Stadium: Estádio do Morumbi; Attendance: 14.159; Referee: Dulcídio Boschilia

22 Jun 1975 Friendly	Rio de Janeiro	1–1	(São Paulo (state)) São Paulo	Rio de Janeiro
	Dirceu 5'		Chicão 58'	Stadium: Estádio do Maracanã; Attendance: 42.758; Referee: Armando Marques

23 Jul 1975 Friendly	Minas Gerais	1–1	(São Paulo (state)) São Paulo	Belo Horizonte
	Batata 40'		Vaguinho 23'	Stadium: Mineirão; Attendance: 34.293; Referee: Dulcídio Boschilia

6 Sep 1975 International	Brazil Olympic	1–0	(São Paulo (state)) São Paulo	Rio de Janeiro
	Darcy 49'			Stadium: Estádio do Maracanã; Referee: Valquir Pimentel

21 Jan 1977 International	Brazil	2–0	(São Paulo (state)) São Paulo	São Paulo
	Gil 31'; Palhinha 64'			Stadium: Estádio do Morumbi; Attendance: 24.498; Referee: Dulcídio Boschilia

16 Jun 1977 International	Brazil	1–1	(São Paulo (state)) São Paulo	São Paulo
	Paulo César 4'		Cláudio Mineiro 73' (pen.)	Stadium: Estádio do Morumbi; Attendance: 102.308; Referee: José Roberto Wright

30 Nov 1980 International	São Paulo (São Paulo (state))	2–2	Soviet Union	São Paulo
	Pita 15'; Paulo César 66'		Ponomaryov 30'; Oganesian 87'	Stadium: Estádio do Morumbi; Attendance: 9.994; Referee: José de Assis Aragão

5 Mar 1981 Taça ACERJ	Rio de Janeiro (Rio de Janeiro (state))	3–3	(São Paulo (state)) São Paulo	Rio de Janeiro
	Luís Pereira 12'; Mário Sérgio 45+1'; Júnior 50'		Toquinho 1'; Sócrates 22'; Jorge Mendonça 67' (pen.)	Stadium: Estádio do Maracanã; Attendance: 23.818; Referee: Arnaldo Cézar Coelho

6 Dec 1981 Friendly	São Paulo (São Paulo (state))	4–3	(Brazil) São Paulo FC	São Paulo
	Jorge Mendonça 12', 85'; Careca 46'; Lela 79'		Renato 4'; Dario Pereyra 22'; Serginho 34'	Stadium: Estádio do Morumbi; Attendance: 7.743; Referee: Dulcídio Boschilia

19 Dec 1982 Friendly	Rio de Janeiro (Rio de Janeiro (state))	4–3	(São Paulo (state)) São Paulo	Rio de Janeiro
	Zico 11', 48' (pen.), 55'; Gilson Gênio 17'		Sócrates 10'; João Paulo 26'; Paulo Egídio 47'	Stadium: Estádio do Maracanã; Attendance: 11.088; Referee: Pedro Bregalda

23 Jan 1984 Friendly	São Paulo (São Paulo (state))	2–1	(Brazil) Palmeiras	São Paulo
	Serginho 18'; Jorge Mendonça 68'		Jorginho Putinatti 32'	Stadium: Estádio do Canindé; Attendance: 9.785; Referee: Roberto Nunes Morgado

4 Sep 1986 Friendly	Japan Soccer League	0–0	(São Paulo (state)) São Paulo	Tokyo, Japan
				Stadium: National Stadium

6 Sep 1986 International	Japan	0–2	(São Paulo (state)) São Paulo	Tokyo, Japan
			Dino	Stadium: National Stadium

8 Sep 1986 International	Japan	0–3	(São Paulo (state)) São Paulo	Tokyo, Japan
			Zé Sérgio; Dino; Gersinho	Stadium: National Stadium

5 Dec 1987 Brasileiro de Seleções	Espírito Santo	0–1	(São Paulo (state)) São Paulo	Cariacica
			Silas 8'	Stadium: Engenheiro Araripe; Referee: Ângelo Antônio Ferrari

8 Dec 1987 Brasileiro de Seleções	São Paulo (São Paulo (state))	1–1	Espírito Santo	São Paulo
	Delem 14'		Naldo 74'	Stadium: Estádio do Pacaembu; Referee: José Roberto Wright

24 Jan 1988 Brasileiro de Seleções	Goiás	1–3	(São Paulo (state)) São Paulo	Anápolis
	Valdir Dias 2'		Agnaldo 20', 29', 70'	Stadium: Estádio Jonas Duarte; Attendance: 2.675; Referee: Pedro Bregalda

31 Jan 1988 Brasileiro de Seleções	São Paulo (São Paulo (state))	1–0	Goiás	São Paulo
	Tato 82'			Stadium: Estádio Universitário São Paulo; Attendance: 2.531; Referee: Paulo Chaves Duarte

4 Fev 1988 Brasileiro de Seleções	Rio de Janeiro (Rio de Janeiro (state))	1–0	(São Paulo (state)) São Paulo	Campos dos Goytacazes
	Amarildo 62'			Stadium: Estádio Godofredo Cruz; Attendance: 10.953; Referee: Ângelo Antônio Ferrari

10 Aug 1988 Torneio de Seleções	Rio Grande do Sul	0–2	(São Paulo (state)) São Paulo	Porto Alegre
			Kita 25'; Careca Bianchezi 29'	Stadium: Beira Rio; Attendance: 1.667; Referee: Renato Marsiglia

14 Aug 1988 Torneio de Seleções	São Paulo (São Paulo (state))	0–1	Minas Gerais	Jundiaí
			Marcinho 62'	Stadium: Estádio Jayme Cintra; Attendance: 761; Referee: José de Assis Aragão

18 Aug 1988 Torneio de Seleções	Bahia	0–1	(São Paulo (state)) São Paulo	Feira de Santana
			Sídney 45'	Stadium: Estádio Joia da Princesa; Attendance: 1.616; Referee: Manuel Serapião Filho

22 Aug 1988 Torneio de Seleções	São Paulo (São Paulo (state))	1–1	Rio Grande do Sul	Limeira
	Kita 89'		Luis Fernando 25'	Stadium: Estádio Major José Levy Sobrinho; Attendance: 5.630; Referee: Almir Peixoto Laguna

25 Aug 1988 Torneio de Seleções	Minas Gerais	1–1	(São Paulo (state)) São Paulo	Belo Horizonte
	Betinho 18' (pen.)		Nílson 4'	Stadium: Mineirão; Attendance: 225; Referee: Ângelo Antônio Ferrari

29 Aug 1988 Torneio de Seleções	Bahia	1–0	(São Paulo (state)) São Paulo	Salvador
	Goal			Stadium: Fonte Nova

7 Jan 1990 Friendly	São Paulo (São Paulo (state))	1–1	Brazil Masters	São Paulo
	Bobô 11'		Serginho 44'	Stadium: Estádio do Canindé; Referee: Romualdo Arppi Filho

25 Jan 1990 Friendly	São Paulo (São Paulo (state))	4–1	(Rio de Janeiro (state)) Rio de Janeiro	São Paulo
	Mirandinha 5', 48', 84'; Betinho 40'		Alcindo 70' (pen.)	Stadium: Estádio do Canindé; Attendance: 10.364; Referee: Ulisses Tavares

18 Dec 1990 Friendly	Bragantino (Brazil)	0–0	(São Paulo (state)) São Paulo	Bragança Paulista
				Stadium: Marcelo Stefani

12 Sep 1996 Friendly	São Paulo (São Paulo (state))	5–3	(Rio de Janeiro (state)) Rio de Janeiro	Presidente Prudente
	Djalminha 23', 53'; Luizão 44', 86'; Cafu 87'		Túlio 28', 72' (pen.); Edmundo 89' (pen.)	Stadium: Estádio Prudentão; Attendance: 17.662; Referee: Getúlio Barbosa Jr.

25 Sep 1996 Friendly	São Paulo (São Paulo (state))	0–2	(Rio de Janeiro (state)) Rio de Janeiro	Ribeirão Preto
			Luisinho 40'; Edmundo 73'	Stadium: Estádio Santa Cruz; Attendance: 12.599; Referee: Carlos Elias Pimentel

21 Jul 1999 Friendly	Minas Gerais	2–3	(São Paulo (state)) São Paulo	Belo Horizonte
	Belletti 22'; Lincoln 51' (pen.)		Marcelinho Carioca 29'; Edílson 42'; Fernando Baiano 68'	Stadium: Mineirão; Attendance: 2.602; Referee: Sidrack Marinho

10 Oct 2004 Friendly	Rio de Janeiro (Rio de Janeiro (state))	1–1	(São Paulo (state)) São Paulo	Rio de Janeiro
	Romário 74'	Report	Anderson Lima 18'	Stadium: Estádio do Maracanã; Attendance: 58.147; Referee: Willian de Souza Nery

1 May 2007 Troféu Miguel Arraes	Pernambuco	0–2	(São Paulo (state)) São Paulo	Recife
		Report	Valdivia 9', 74'	Stadium: Estádio do Arruda; Referee: Cláudio Mercante

9 Dec 2010 Copa Inovação	São Paulo (São Paulo (state))	3–1	(Rio de Janeiro (state)) Rio de Janeiro	São Caetano do Sul
	Elano 8' (pen.); Baiano 50'; Neymar 84' (pen.)	Report	Dedé 22'	Stadium: Estádio Anacleto Campanella; Referee: Sávio Spínola
