= Brazil national football team results (1950–1969) =

This page details the match results and statistics of the Brazil national football team from 1950 to 1969.

== Key ==
Key to matches

- Att.=Match attendance
- (H)=Home ground
- (A)=Away ground
- (N)=Neutral ground

Key to record by opponent

- Pld=Games played
- W=Games won
- D=Games drawn
- L=Games lost
- GF=Goals for
- GA=Goals against

== Results ==
Brazil's score is shown first in each case.

No.	Date	Venue	Opponents	Score	Competition	Brazil scorers	Att.	Ref.
104	6 May 1950	Pacaembu Stadium, São Paulo (H)	Uruguay	3–4	Copa Río Branco	Zizinho, Ademir (2)	—	
105	7 May 1950	Estádio São Januário, Rio de Janeiro (H)	Paraguay	2–0	Taça Oswaldo Cruz	Pinga (2)	—	
106	13 May 1950	Pacaembu Stadium, São Paulo (H)	Paraguay	3–3	Taça Oswaldo Cruz	Pinga, Maneca, Baltazar	—	
107	14 May 1950	Estádio São Januário, Rio de Janeiro (H)	Uruguay	3–2	Copa Río Branco	Ademir, González (o.g.), Chico	—	
108	18 May 1950	Estádio São Januário, Rio de Janeiro (H)	Uruguay	1–0	Copa Río Branco	Ademir	—	
109	24 June 1950	Maracanã Stadium, Rio de Janeiro (N)	Mexico	4–0	1950 FIFA World Cup	Ademir (2), Jair, Baltazar	81,649	
110	28 June 1950	Pacaembu Stadium, São Paulo (N)	Switzerland	2–2	1950 FIFA World Cup	Alfredo II, Baltazar	42,032	
111	1 July 1950	Maracanã Stadium, Rio de Janeiro (N)	Yugoslavia	2–0	1950 FIFA World Cup	Ademir, Zizinho	142,429	
112	9 July 1950	Maracanã Stadium, Rio de Janeiro (N)	Sweden	7–1	1950 FIFA World Cup	Ademir (4), Chico (2), Maneca	138,886	
113	13 July 1950	Maracanã Stadium, Rio de Janeiro (N)	Spain	6–1	1950 FIFA World Cup	Jair, Chico (2), Ademir, (2), Zizinho	152,772	
114	16 July 1950	Maracanã Stadium, Rio de Janeiro (N)	Uruguay	1–2	1950 FIFA World Cup	Friaça	199,854	
115	6 April 1952	Estadio Nacional, Santiago (N)	Mexico	2–0	1952 Panamerican Championship	Baltazar (2)	—	
116	10 April 1952	Estadio Nacional, Santiago (N)	Peru	0–0	1952 Panamerican Championship		—	
117	13 April 1952	Estadio Nacional, Santiago (N)	Panama	5–0	1952 Panamerican Championship	Baltazar, Rodrigues (2), Julinho, Pinga	—	
118	16 April 1952	Estadio Nacional, Santiago (N)	Uruguay	4–2	1952 Panamerican Championship	Didi, Baltazar, Pinga, Rodrigues	—	
119	20 April 1952	Estadio Nacional, Santiago (N)	Chile	3–0	1952 Panamerican Championship	Ademir (2), Pinga	—	
120	1 March 1953	Estadio Nacional, Lima (N)	Bolivia	8–1	1953 South American Championship	Julinho (4), Rodrigues (2), Pinga (2)	45,000	
121	12 March 1953	Estadio Nacional, Lima (N)	Ecuador	2–0	1953 South American Championship	Ademir, Cláudio	35,000	
122	15 March 1953	Estadio Nacional, Lima (N)	Uruguay	1–0	1953 South American Championship	Ipojucan	45,000	
123	19 March 1953	Estadio Nacional, Lima (N)	Peru	0–1	1953 South American Championship		55,000	
124	23 March 1953	Estadio Nacional, Lima (N)	Chile	3–2	1953 South American Championship	Julinho, Zizinho, Baltazar	35,000	
125	27 March 1953	Estadio Nacional, Lima (N)	Paraguay	1–2	1953 South American Championship	Nílton Santos	35,000	
126	1 April 1953	Estadio Nacional, Lima (N)	Paraguay	2–3	1953 South American Championship	Baltazar (2)	35,000	
127	28 February 1954	Estadio Nacional, Santiago (A)	Chile	2–0	1954 FIFA World Cup qualification	Baltazar (2)	—	
128	7 March 1954	Estadio Club Libertad, Asunción (A)	Paraguay	1–0	1954 FIFA World Cup qualification	Baltazar	—	
129	14 March 1954	Maracanã Stadium, Rio de Janeiro (H)	Chile	1–0	1954 FIFA World Cup qualification	Baltazar	—	
130	21 March 1954	Maracanã Stadium, Rio de Janeiro (H)	Paraguay	4–1	1954 FIFA World Cup qualification	Julinho (2), Baltazar, Maurinho	174,599	
131	16 June 1954	Charmilles Stadium, Geneva (N)	Mexico	5–0	1954 FIFA World Cup	Baltazar, Didi, Pinga (2), Julinho	13,470	
132	19 June 1954	Stade Olympique de la Pontaise, Lausanne (N)	Yugoslavia	1–1 (a.e.t.)	1954 FIFA World Cup	Didi	24,637	
133	27 June 1954	Wankdorf Stadium, Bern (N)	Hungary	2–4	1954 FIFA World Cup	Djalma Santos, Julinho	40,000	
134	18 September 1955	Maracanã Stadium, Rio de Janeiro (H)	Chile	1–1	Copa Bernardo O'Higgins	Pinheiro	—	
135	20 September 1955	Pacaembu Stadium, São Paulo (H)	Chile	2–1	Copa Bernardo O'Higgins	Maurinho, Álvaro	—	
136	13 November 1955	Maracanã Stadium, Rio de Janeiro (H)	Paraguay	3–0	Taça Oswaldo Cruz	Zizinho (2), Sabará	65,277	
137	17 November 1955	Pacaembu Stadium, São Paulo (H)	Paraguay	3–3	Taça Oswaldo Cruz	Maurinho, Canhoteiro, Tozzi	41,478	
138	24 January 1956	Estadio Centenario, Montevideo (N)	Chile	1–4	1956 South American Championship	Maurinho	18,000	
139	29 January 1956	Estadio Centenario, Montevideo (N)	Paraguay	0–0	1956 South American Championship		45,000	
140	1 February 1956	Estadio Centenario, Montevideo (N)	Peru	2–1	1956 South American Championship	Álvaro, Zezinho	20,000	
141	5 February 1956	Estadio Centenario, Montevideo (N)	Argentina	1–0	1956 South American Championship	Luizinho	25,000	
142	10 February 1956	Estadio Centenario, Montevideo (N)	Uruguay	0–0	1956 South American Championship		80,000	
143	1 March 1956	Estadio Olímpico Universitario, Mexico City (N)	Chile	2–1	1956 Panamerican Championship	Luizinho, Raul Klein	14,000	
144	6 March 1956	Estadio Olímpico Universitario, Mexico City (N)	Peru	1–0	1956 Panamerican Championship	Larry	70,000	
145	8 March 1956	Estadio Olímpico Universitario, Mexico City (N)	Mexico	2–1	1956 Panamerican Championship	Bodinho, Bravo (o.g.)	80,000	
146	13 March 1956	Estadio Olímpico Universitario, Mexico City (N)	Costa Rica	7–1	1956 Panamerican Championship	Larry (3), Chinesinho (3), Bodinho	65,000	
147	18 March 1956	Estadio Olímpico Universitario, Mexico City (N)	Argentina	2–2	1956 Panamerican Championship	Chinesinho, Andrade	—	
148	8 April 1956	Estádio Nacional, Lisbon (A)	Portugal	1–0	Friendly	Gino	—	
149	11 April 1956	Hardturm, Zürich (A)	Switzerland	1–1	Friendly	Gino	—	
150	15 April 1956	Praterstadion, Vienna (A)	Austria	3–2	Friendly	Gino, Zózimo, Didi	65,000	
151	21 April 1956	Great Strahov Stadium, Prague (A)	Czechoslovakia	0–0	Friendly		45,000	
152	25 April 1956	San Siro, Milan (A)	Italy	0–3	Friendly		80,000	
153	1 May 1956	Mithatpaşa Stadium, Istanbul (A)	Turkey	1–0	Friendly	Djalma Santos	—	
154	9 May 1956	Wembley Stadium, London (A)	England	2–4	Friendly	Paulinho, Didi	97,000	
155	12 June 1956	Estadio Club Libertad, Asunción (A)	Paraguay	2–0	Taça Oswaldo Cruz	Ferreira (2)	—	
156	17 June 1956	Estadio Club Libertad, Asunción (A)	Paraguay	5–2	Taça Oswaldo Cruz	Leônidas da Selva, Zizinho (2), Ferreira, Ílton Vaccari	—	
157	24 June 1956	Maracanã Stadium, Rio de Janeiro (H)	Uruguay	2–0	Taça do Atlântico	Zizinho, Canário	59,816	
158	1 July 1956	Maracanã Stadium, Rio de Janeiro (H)	Italy	2–0	Friendly	Ferreira, Canário	118,514	
159	8 July 1956	Estadio Presidente Juan Domingo Perón, Avellaneda (A)	Argentina	0–0	Taça do Atlântico		—	
160	5 August 1956	Maracanã Stadium, Rio de Janeiro (H)	Czechoslovakia	0–1	Friendly		130,000	
161	8 August 1956	Pacaembu Stadium, São Paulo (H)	Czechoslovakia	4–1	Friendly	Zizinho (2), Pepe (2)	62,000	
162	13 March 1957	Estadio Nacional, Lima (N)	Chile	4–2	1957 South American Championship	Didi (3), Pepe	42,000	
163	21 March 1957	Estadio Nacional, Lima (N)	Ecuador	7–1	1957 South American Championship	Evaristo (3), Pepe, Zizinho, Joel, Didi	45,000	
164	24 March 1957	Estadio Nacional, Lima (N)	Colombia	9–0	1957 South American Championship	Pepe, Evaristo (5), Didi (2), Zizinho	45,000	
165	28 March 1957	Estadio Nacional, Lima (N)	Uruguay	2–3	1957 South American Championship	Evaristo, Didi	50,000	
166	31 March 1957	Estadio Nacional, Lima (N)	Peru	1–0	1957 South American Championship	Didi	55,000	
167	3 April 1957	Estadio Nacional, Lima (N)	Argentina	0–3	1957 South American Championship		55,000	
168	13 April 1957	Estadio Nacional, Lima (A)	Peru	1–1	1958 FIFA World Cup qualification	Índio	—	
169	21 April 1957	Maracanã Stadium, Rio de Janeiro (H)	Peru	1–0	1958 FIFA World Cup qualification	Didi	82,624	
170	11 June 1957	Maracanã Stadium, Rio de Janeiro (H)	Portugal	2–1	Friendly	Didi, Tite	—	
171	16 June 1957	Pacaembu Stadium, São Paulo (H)	Portugal	3–0	Friendly	Zito, Mazzola, Del Vecchio	—	
172	7 July 1957	Maracanã Stadium, Rio de Janeiro (H)	Argentina	1–2	Copa Julio Argentino Roca	Pelé	—	
173	10 July 1957	Pacaembu Stadium, São Paulo (H)	Argentina	2–0 (a.e.t.)	Copa Julio Argentino Roca	Pelé, Mazzola	—	
174	15 September 1957	Estadio Nacional, Santiago (A)	Chile	0–1	Copa Bernardo O'Higgins		—	
175	18 September 1957	Estadio Nacional, Santiago (A)	Chile	1–1 (a.e.t.)	Copa Bernardo O'Higgins	Matos	—	
176	4 May 1958	Maracanã Stadium, Rio de Janeiro (H)	Paraguay	5–1	Taça Oswaldo Cruz	Zagallo (2), Vavá, Dida, Pelé	—	
177	7 May 1958	Pacaembu Stadium, São Paulo (H)	Paraguay	0–0	Taça Oswaldo Cruz		—	
178	14 May 1958	Maracanã Stadium, Rio de Janeiro (H)	Bulgaria	4–0	Friendly	Dida, Moacyr (2), Joel	140,000	
179	18 May 1958	Pacaembu Stadium, São Paulo (H)	Bulgaria	3–1	Friendly	Pelé (2), Pepe	70,000	
180	8 June 1958	Rimnersvallen, Uddevalla (N)	Austria	3–0	1958 FIFA World Cup	Mazzola (2), Nílton Santos	17,778	
181	11 June 1958	Ullevi, Gothenburg (N)	England	0–0	1958 FIFA World Cup		40,895	
182	15 June 1958	Ullevi, Gothenburg (N)	Soviet Union	2–0	1958 FIFA World Cup	Vavá (2)	50,928	
183	19 June 1958	Ullevi, Gothenburg (N)	Wales	1–0	1958 FIFA World Cup	Pelé	25,923	
184	24 June 1958	Råsunda Stadium, Solna (N)	France	5–2	1958 FIFA World Cup	Vavá, Didi, Pelé (3)	27,100	
185	29 June 1958	Råsunda Stadium, Solna (N)	Sweden	5–2	1958 FIFA World Cup	Vavá (2), Pelé (2), Zagallo	49,737	
186	10 March 1959	Estadio Monumental, Buenos Aires (N)	Peru	2–2	1959 South American Championship (Argentina)	Didi, Pelé	45,000	
187	15 March 1959	Estadio Monumental, Buenos Aires (N)	Chile	3–0	1959 South American Championship (Argentina)	Pelé (2), Didi	40,000	
188	21 March 1959	Estadio Monumental, Buenos Aires (N)	Bolivia	4–2	1959 South American Championship (Argentina)	Pelé, Paulo Valentim (2), Didi	25,000	
189	26 March 1959	Estadio Monumental, Buenos Aires (N)	Uruguay	3–1	1959 South American Championship (Argentina)	Paulo Valentim (3)	70,000	
190	29 March 1959	Estadio Monumental, Buenos Aires (N)	Paraguay	4–1	1959 South American Championship (Argentina)	Pelé (3), Chinesinho	40,000	
191	4 April 1959	Estadio Monumental, Buenos Aires (N)	Argentina	1–1	1959 South American Championship (Argentina)	Pelé	85,000	
192	13 May 1959	Maracanã Stadium, Rio de Janeiro (H)	England	2–0	Friendly	Julinho, Henrique Frade	160,000	
193	17 September 1959	Maracanã Stadium, Rio de Janeiro (H)	Chile	7–0	Copa Bernardo O'Higgins	Pelé (3), Dorval, Quarentinha (2), Dino Sani	—	
194	20 September 1959	Pacaembu Stadium, São Paulo (H)	Chile	1–0	Copa Bernardo O'Higgins	Quarentinha	—	
195	5 December 1959	Estadio Modelo, Guayaquil (N)	Paraguay	3–2	1959 South American Championship (Ecuador)	Paulo (3)	35,000	
196	12 December 1959	Estadio Modelo, Guayaquil (N)	Uruguay	0–3	1959 South American Championship (Ecuador)		55,000	
197	19 December 1959	Estadio Modelo, Guayaquil (N)	Ecuador	3–1	1959 South American Championship (Ecuador)	Paulo, Geraldo, Zé de Mello	55,000	
198	22 December 1959	Estadio Modelo, Guayaquil (N)	Argentina	1–4	1959 South American Championship (Ecuador)	Geraldo	42,000	
199	27 December 1959	Estadio Modelo, Guayaquil (A)	Ecuador	2–1	Friendly	Traçaia, Zé de Mello	—	
200	6 March 1960	Estadio Nacional, San José (N)	Mexico	2–2	1960 Panamerican Championship	Élton, Gilberto	30,000	
201	10 March 1960	Estadio Nacional, San José (N)	Costa Rica	0–3	1960 Panamerican Championship		—	
202	13 March 1960	Estadio Nacional, San José (N)	Argentina	1–2	1960 Panamerican Championship	Juarez	—	
203	15 March 1960	Estadio Nacional, San José (N)	Mexico	2–1	1960 Panamerican Championship	Alfeu, Mengálvio	30,000	
204	17 March 1960	Estadio Nacional, San José (N)	Costa Rica	4–0	1960 Panamerican Championship	Juarez (2), Élton (2)	—	
205	20 March 1960	Estadio Nacional, San José (N)	Argentina	1–0	1960 Panamerican Championship	Mílton Kuelle	—	
206	29 April 1960	Mokhtar El Tetsh Stadium, Cairo (A)	United Arab Republic	5–0	Friendly	Quarentinha (2), Garrincha, Pepe (2)	—	
207	1 May 1960	Alexandria Stadium, Alexandria (A)	United Arab Republic	3–1	Friendly	Pelé (3)	—	
208	6 May 1960	Mohammed Hassan Helmy Stadium, Cairo (A)	United Arab Republic	3–0	Friendly	Quarentinha (2), Garrincha	—	
209	26 May 1960	Estadio Monumental, Buenos Aires (A)	Argentina	2–4	Copa Julio Argentino Roca	Djalma Santos, Delém	—	
210	29 May 1960	Estadio Monumental, Buenos Aires (A)	Argentina	4–1 (a.e.t.)	Copa Julio Argentino Roca	Delém (2), Navarro (o.g.), Servílio	63,500	
211	29 June 1960	Maracanã Stadium, Rio de Janeiro (H)	Chile	4–0	Friendly	Dida, Vavá, Waldo (2)	—	
212	3 July 1960	Estadio Club Libertad, Asunción (A)	Paraguay	2–1	Taça do Atlântico	Chinesinho, Delém	—	
213	9 July 1960	Estadio Centenario, Montevideo (A)	Uruguay	0–1	Taça do Atlântico		—	
214	12 July 1960	Maracanã Stadium, Rio de Janeiro (H)	Argentina	5–1	Taça do Atlântico	Chinesinho, Pelé, Delém, Pepe (2)	—	
215	30 April 1961	Estadio Defensores del Chaco, Asunción (A)	Paraguay	2–0	Taça Oswaldo Cruz	Coutinho, Pepe	—	
216	3 May 1961	Estadio Defensores del Chaco, Asunción (A)	Paraguay	3–2	Taça Oswaldo Cruz	Coutinho (2), Quarentinha	—	
217	7 May 1961	Estadio Nacional, Santiago (A)	Chile	2–1	Copa Bernardo O'Higgins	Garrincha, Didi	—	
218	11 May 1961	Estadio Nacional, Santiago (A)	Chile	1–0	Copa Bernardo O'Higgins	Gérson	—	
219	19 June 1961	Maracanã Stadium, Rio de Janeiro (H)	Paraguay	3–2	Friendly	Joel, Dida, Henrique Frade	—	
220	21 April 1962	Maracanã Stadium, Rio de Janeiro (H)	Paraguay	6–0	Taça Oswaldo Cruz	Didi, Pelé, Coutinho, Nílton Santos, Vavá, Garrincha	—	
221	24 April 1962	Pacaembu Stadium, São Paulo (H)	Paraguay	4–0	Taça Oswaldo Cruz	Pepe, Pelé (2), Vavá	—	
222	6 May 1962	Pacaembu Stadium, São Paulo (H)	Portugal	2–1	Friendly	Vavá, Zequinha	—	
223	9 May 1962	Maracanã Stadium, Rio de Janeiro (H)	Portugal	1–0	Friendly	Pelé	—	
224	12 May 1962	Maracanã Stadium, Rio de Janeiro (H)	Wales	3–1	Friendly	Garrincha, Coutinho, Pelé	—	
225	16 May 1962	Pacaembu Stadium, São Paulo (H)	Wales	3–1	Friendly	Vavá, Pelé (2)	—	
226	30 May 1962	Estadio Sausalito, Viña del Mar (N)	Mexico	2–0	1962 FIFA World Cup	Zagallo, Pelé	10,484	
227	2 June 1962	Estadio Sausalito, Viña del Mar (N)	Czechoslovakia	0–0	1962 FIFA World Cup		14,903	
228	6 June 1962	Estadio Sausalito, Viña del Mar (N)	Spain	2–1	1962 FIFA World Cup	Amarildo (2)	18,715	
229	10 June 1962	Estadio Sausalito, Viña del Mar (N)	England	3–1	1962 FIFA World Cup	Garrincha (2), Vavá	17,736	
230	13 June 1962	Estadio Nacional, Santiago (N)	Chile	4–2	1962 FIFA World Cup	Garrincha (2), Vavá (2)	76,594	
231	17 June 1962	Estadio Nacional, Santiago (N)	Czechoslovakia	3–1	1962 FIFA World Cup	Amarildo, Zito, Vavá	68,679	
232	3 March 1963	Estadio Defensores del Chaco, Asunción (A)	Paraguay	2–2	Friendly	Flávio, Ilton Chaves	—	
233	10 March 1963	Estadio Félix Capriles, Cochabamba (N)	Peru	1–0	1963 South American Championship	Oswaldo	18,000	
234	14 March 1963	Estadio Hernando Siles, La Paz (N)	Colombia	5–1	1963 South American Championship	Flávio, Oswaldo, Marco Antônio, Fernando (2)	15,000	
235	17 March 1963	Estadio Hernando Siles, La Paz (N)	Paraguay	0–2	1963 South American Championship		8,000	
236	24 March 1963	Estadio Hernando Siles, La Paz (N)	Argentina	0–3	1963 South American Championship		30,000	
237	27 March 1963	Estadio Félix Capriles, Cochabamba (N)	Ecuador	2–2	1963 South American Championship	Oswaldo (2)	20,000	
238	31 March 1963	Estadio Félix Capriles, Cochabamba (N)	Bolivia	4–5	1963 South American Championship	Flávio (2), Marco Antônio, Almir	25,000	
239	13 April 1963	Estádio do Morumbi, São Paulo (H)	Argentina	2–3	Copa Julio Argentino Roca	Pepe (2)	—	
240	16 April 1963	Maracanã Stadium, Rio de Janeiro (H)	Argentina	5–2 (a.e.t.)	Copa Julio Argentino Roca	Pelé (3), Amarildo (2)	—	
241	21 April 1963	Estádio Nacional, Lisbon (A)	Portugal	0–1	Friendly		—	
242	24 April 1963	Heysel Stadium, Brussels (A)	Belgium	1–5	Friendly	Quarentinha	46,909	
243	28 April 1963	Stade Olympique de Colombes, Paris (A)	France	3–2	Friendly	Pelé (3)	50,000	
244	2 May 1963	Olympic Stadium, Amsterdam (A)	Netherlands	0–1	Friendly		60,000	
245	5 May 1963	Volksparkstadion, Hamburg (A)	West Germany	2–1	Friendly	Coutinho, Pelé	—	
246	8 May 1963	Wembley Stadium, London (A)	England	1–1	Friendly	Pepe	92,000	
247	12 May 1963	San Siro, Milan (A)	Italy	0–3	Friendly		72,000	
248	17 May 1963	Nasser Stadium, Cairo (A)	Egypt	1–0	Friendly	Quarentinha	—	
249	19 May 1963	Ramat Gan Stadium, Ramat Gan (A)	Israel	5–0	Friendly	Zequinha, Quarentinha (2), Amarildo (2)	42,000	
250	30 May 1964	Maracanã Stadium, Rio de Janeiro (H)	England	5–1	Taça das Nações	Rinaldo (2), Pelé, Julinho, Roberto Dias	77,000	
251	3 June 1964	Pacaembu Stadium, São Paulo (H)	Argentina	0–3	Taça das Nações		60,000	
252	7 June 1964	Maracanã Stadium, Rio de Janeiro (H)	Portugal	4–1	Taça das Nações	Pelé, Jairzinho, Gérson (2)	60,000	
253	2 June 1965	Maracanã Stadium, Rio de Janeiro (H)	Belgium	5–0	Friendly	Pelé (3), Flávio, Rinaldo	110,000	
254	6 June 1965	Maracanã Stadium, Rio de Janeiro (H)	West Germany	2–0	Friendly	Flávio, Pelé	—	
255	9 June 1965	Maracanã Stadium, Rio de Janeiro (H)	Argentina	0–0	Friendly		—	
256	17 June 1965	Parc Municipal, Oran (A)	Algeria	3–0	Friendly	Pelé, Dudu, Gérson	—	
257	24 June 1965	Estádio das Antas, Porto (A)	Portugal	0–0	Friendly		—	
258	30 June 1965	Råsunda Stadium, Solna (N)	Sweden	2–1	Friendly	Pelé, Gérson	16,750	
259	4 July 1965	Central Lenin Stadium, Moscow (A)	Soviet Union	3–0	Friendly	Pelé (2), Flávio	103,000	
260	7 September 1965	Mineirão, Belo Horizonte (H)	Uruguay	3–0	Friendly	Rinaldo, Tupãzinho, Germano	—	
261	21 November 1965	Maracanã Stadium, Rio de Janeiro (H)	Soviet Union	2–2	Friendly	Gérson, Pelé	123,000	
262	17 April 1966	Estadio Nacional, Santiago (A)	Chile	1–0	Copa Bernardo O'Higgins	João Severiano	—	
263	20 April 1966	Estadio Sausalito, Viña del Mar (A)	Chile	1–2	Copa Bernardo O'Higgins	João Severiano	—	
264	14 May 1966	Maracanã Stadium, Rio de Janeiro (H)	Wales	3–1	Friendly	Silva, Servílio, Garrincha	64,000	
265	15 May 1966	Estádio do Morumbi, São Paulo (H)	Chile	1–1	Friendly	Rinaldo	—	
266	18 May 1966	Mineirão, Belo Horizonte (H)	Wales	1–0	Friendly	Lima	—	
267	19 May 1966	Maracanã Stadium, Rio de Janeiro (H)	Chile	1–0	Friendly	Gérson	—	
268	4 June 1966	Estádio do Morumbi, São Paulo (H)	Peru	4–0	Friendly	Lima (2), Pelé, Paraná	16,000	
269	5 June 1966	Mineirão, Belo Horizonte (H)	Poland	4–1	Friendly	Alcindo, Tostão (2), Denílson	—	
270	8 June 1966	Maracanã Stadium, Rio de Janeiro (H)	Peru	3–1	Friendly	Fidélis, Tostão, Edu	—	
271	8 June 1966	Maracanã Stadium, Rio de Janeiro (H)	Poland	2–1	Friendly	Silva, Garrincha	109,380	
272	12 June 1966	Maracanã Stadium, Rio de Janeiro (H)	Czechoslovakia	2–1	Friendly	Pelé (2)	82,976	
273	15 June 1966	Maracanã Stadium, Rio de Janeiro (H)	Czechoslovakia	2–2	Friendly	Pelé, Zito	62,000	
274	25 June 1966	Hampden Park, Glasgow (A)	Scotland	1–1	Friendly	Servílio	74,933	
275	30 June 1966	Ullevi, Gothenburg (A)	Sweden	3–2	Friendly	Tostão (2), Gérson	46,824	
276	12 July 1966	Goodison Park, Liverpool (N)	Bulgaria	2–0	1966 FIFA World Cup	Pelé, Garrincha	47,308	
277	15 July 1966	Goodison Park, Liverpool (N)	Hungary	1–3	1966 FIFA World Cup	Tostão	51,387	
278	19 July 1966	Goodison Park, Liverpool (N)	Portugal	1–3	1966 FIFA World Cup	Rildo	58,479	
279	25 June 1967	Estadio Centenario, Montevideo (A)	Uruguay	0–0	Copa Río Branco		—	
280	28 June 1967	Estadio Centenario, Montevideo (A)	Uruguay	2–2	Copa Río Branco	Paulo Borges (2)	—	
281	1 July 1967	Estadio Centenario, Montevideo (A)	Uruguay	1–1	Copa Río Branco	Dirceu Lopes	—	
282	19 September 1967	Estadio Nacional, Santiago (A)	Chile	1–0	Friendly	Roberto	—	
283	9 June 1968	Pacaembu Stadium, São Paulo (H)	Uruguay	2–0	Copa Río Branco	Tostão, Sadi	—	
284	12 June 1968	Maracanã Stadium, Rio de Janeiro (H)	Uruguay	4–0	Copa Río Branco	Paulo Borges, Tostão, Gérson, Jairzinho	—	
285	16 June 1968	Neckarstadion, Stuttgart (A)	West Germany	1–2	Friendly	Tostão	74,164	
286	20 June 1968	Stadion Dziesięciolecia Manifestu Lipcowego, Warsaw (A)	Poland	6–3	Friendly	Natal, Rivellino (2), Tostão, Jairzinho (2)	51,128	
287	23 June 1968	Tehelné pole, Bratislava (A)	Czechoslovakia	2–3	Friendly	Natal, Carlos Alberto	60,000	
288	25 June 1968	JNA Stadium, Belgrade (A)	Yugoslavia	2–0	Friendly	Carlos Alberto, Tostão	30,000	
289	30 June 1968	Estádio da Machava, Lourenço Marques (N)	Portugal	2–0	Friendly	Rivellino, Tostão	60,000	
290	7 July 1968	Estadio Azteca, Mexico City (A)	Mexico	2–0	Friendly	Jairzinho (2)	—	
291	10 July 1968	Estadio Azteca, Mexico City (A)	Mexico	1–2	Friendly	Rivellino	71,036	
292	14 July 1968	Estadio Nacional, Lima (A)	Peru	4–3	Taça Jorge Chávez/Santos Dumont	Natal, Roberto Miranda, Jairzinho, Carlos Alberto	—	
293	17 July 1968	Estadio Nacional, Lima (A)	Peru	4–0	Taça Jorge Chávez/Santos Dumont	Rivellino, Gérson, Tostão, Jairzinho	—	
294	25 July 1968	Estadio Defensores del Chaco, Asunción (A)	Paraguay	4–0	Taça Oswaldo Cruz	Pelé (2), Toninho Guerreiro, Eduardo	—	
295	28 July 1968	Estadio Defensores del Chaco, Asunción (A)	Paraguay	0–1	Taça Oswaldo Cruz		—	
296	7 August 1968	Maracanã Stadium, Rio de Janeiro (H)	Argentina	4–1	Friendly	Valtencir, Roberto Miranda (2), Jairzinho	—	(Note: AFA do not consider this match as an official Class A game. According to Argentine Football Association, it would be a match against a Rio de Janeiro´s Selection, not Brazil´s national team.)
297	11 August 1968	Mineirão, Belo Horizonte (H)	Argentina	3–2	Friendly	Evaldo, Rodrigues, Dirceu Lopes	—	(Note: AFA do not consider this match as an official Class A game. According to Argentine Football Association, it would be a match against a Minas Gerais Selection, not Brazil national´s team.)
298	31 October 1968	Maracanã Stadium, Rio de Janeiro (H)	Mexico	1–2	Friendly	Carlos Alberto	—	
299	3 November 1968	Mineirão, Belo Horizonte (H)	Mexico	2–1	Friendly	Jairzinho, Pelé	—	
300	14 December 1968	Maracanã Stadium, Rio de Janeiro (H)	West Germany	2–2	Friendly	Edu (2)	—	
301	17 December 1968	Maracanã Stadium, Rio de Janeiro (H)	Yugoslavia	3–3	Friendly	Carlos Alberto, Pelé, Babá	70,000	
302	19 December 1968	Mineirão, Belo Horizonte (H)	Yugoslavia	3–2	Friendly	Vaguinho, Amauri, Ronaldo	—	
303	7 April 1969	Estádio Beira-Rio, Porto Alegre (H)	Peru	2–1	Friendly	Jairzinho, Gérson	—	
304	9 April 1969	Maracanã Stadium, Rio de Janeiro (H)	Peru	3–2	Friendly	Pelé, Tostão, Edu	80,302	
305	12 June 1969	Maracanã Stadium, Rio de Janeiro (H)	England	2–1	Friendly	Tostão, Jairzinho	135,000	
306	6 August 1969	Estadio El Campín, Bogotá (A)	Colombia	2–0	1970 FIFA World Cup qualification	Tostão (2)	51,131	
307	10 August 1969	Estadio Olímpico, Caracas (A)	Venezuela	5–0	1970 FIFA World Cup qualification	Tostão (3), Pelé (2)	30,063	
308	17 August 1969	Estadio Defensores del Chaco, Asunción (A)	Paraguay	3–0	1970 FIFA World Cup qualification	Mendoza (o.g.), Jairzinho, Edu	44,880	
309	21 August 1969	Maracanã Stadium, Rio de Janeiro (H)	Colombia	6–2	1970 FIFA World Cup qualification	Tostão (2), Edu, Pelé, Rivellino, Jairzinho	99,947	
310	24 August 1969	Maracanã Stadium, Rio de Janeiro (H)	Venezuela	6–0	1970 FIFA World Cup qualification	Tostão (3), Jairzinho, Pelé (2)	122,841	
311	31 August 1969	Maracanã Stadium, Rio de Janeiro (H)	Paraguay	1–0	1970 FIFA World Cup qualification	Pelé	183,341	

Notes

1. A: Match abandoned after 87 minutes when an injury to Roberto Leopardi left Uruguay with less than six players onfield.
2. B: Match abandoned after 78 minutes following a disagreement between the Peruvian players and the referee.

== Record by opponent ==
Team	Pld	W	D	L	GF	GA	GD	WPCT
Algeria	1	1	0	0	3	0	+3	100.00
Argentina (Note: AFA do not consider the 1968´s two matches as official Class A games. According to Argentine Football Association, they would be 2 matches against a Rio de Janeiro´s Selection (8-7-68) and a Minas Gerais Selection (8-11-68), not Brazil national´s team.)	20	8	4	8	35	34	+1	40.00
Austria	2	2	0	0	6	2	+4	100.00
Belgium	2	1	0	1	6	5	+1	50.00
Bolivia	3	2	0	1	16	8	+8	66.67
Bulgaria	3	3	0	0	9	1	+8	100.00
Chile	23	17	3	3	47	18	+29	73.91
Colombia	4	4	0	0	22	3	+19	100.00
Costa Rica	3	2	0	1	11	4	+7	66.67
Czechoslovakia	8	3	3	2	13	9	+4	37.50
Ecuador	5	4	1	0	16	5	+11	80.00
Egypt	1	1	0	0	1	0	+1	100.00
England	7	4	2	1	15	8	+7	57.14
France	2	2	0	0	8	4	+4	100.00
Hungary	2	0	0	2	3	7	−4	0.00
Israel	1	1	0	0	5	0	+5	100.00
Italy	3	1	0	2	2	6	−4	33.33
Mexico	11	8	1	2	25	9	+16	72.73
Netherlands	1	0	0	1	0	1	−1	0.00
Panama	1	1	0	0	5	0	+5	100.00
Paraguay	27	18	5	4	68	28	+40	66.67
Peru	15	11	3	1	29	12	+17	73.33
Poland	3	3	0	0	12	5	+7	100.00
Portugal	10	7	1	2	16	7	+9	70.00
Scotland	1	0	1	0	1	1	0	0.00
Soviet Union	3	2	1	0	7	2	+5	66.67
Spain	2	2	0	0	8	2	+6	100.00
Sweden	4	4	0	0	17	6	+11	100.00
Switzerland	2	0	2	0	3	3	0	0.00
Turkey	1	1	0	0	1	0	+1	100.00
United Arab Republic	3	3	0	0	11	1	+10	100.00
Uruguay	18	9	4	5	32	21	+11	50.00
Venezuela	2	2	0	0	11	0	+11	100.00
Wales	5	5	0	0	11	3	+8	100.00
West Germany	4	2	1	1	7	5	+2	50.00
Yugoslavia	5	3	2	0	11	6	+5	60.00
Total	208	137	34	37	493	226	+267	65.87

Source: Results
