= Jair Bala =

Brazilian footballer (1943–2022)

Personal information
- Full name: Jair Félix da Silva
- Date of birth: 10 May 1943
- Place of birth: Cachoeiro de Itapemirim, Brazil
- Date of death: 27 December 2022 (aged 79)
- Place of death: Belo Horizonte, Brazil
- Height: 1.80 m (5 ft 11 in)
- Position: Left winger

Youth career
- 1953–1959: Estrela do Norte

Senior career*
Years	Team	Apps	(Gls)
1960–1962	Flamengo		
1963	Botafogo		
1964–1965	América Mineiro		
1965–1966	Comercial-SP		
1967	Palmeiras		
1968–1969	XV de Piracicaba		
1969	Santos		
1970–1972	América Mineiro		
1972–1973	Paysandu		

Managerial career
- 1976: Sete de Setembro-MG
- 1978–1979: América Mineiro
- 1979–1980: Londrina
- 1981–1982: Comercial-SP
- 1982–1985: América Mineiro
- 1985: Grêmio Maringá
- 1986: Cruzeiro
- 1986–1988: América Mineiro
- 1989: Esportivo-MG
- 1990: Caldense
- 1992–1993: Valerio
- 1994: Mamoré
- 1995: Democrata-GV
- 1996: URT
- 1996: Valerio
- 2002: Mamoré
- * Club domestic league appearances and goals as of 13 February 2024

Jair Félix da Silva (10 May 1943 – 27 December 2022), better known as Jair Bala, was a Brazilian professional footballer and manager, who played as a left winger.

== Career ==
Jair started his career at Estrela do Norte in his hometown. In 1960 he was taken to Flamengo where he played 14 matches and scored 2 goals. He received the nickname Jair Bala (bullet) because he was accidentally shot by a fellow club member while playing in the 60s, leaving the bullet lodged in his body. In 1963 he transferred to Botafogo, where he played alongside Nilton Santos and Garrincha. In 1964 he arrived at América Mineiro, being the state's top scorer that year with 19 goals.

In 1966, he was acquired by Comercial de Ribeirão Preto, who had already bought his attacking companions at América, Ari and Marco Antônio (considered the best attack in the history of América Mineiro according to its fans). and repeating the success achieved in Minas Gerais football. In 1967, he was hired by Palmeiras, and was part of the squad that won the Taça Brasil that year. He would still play for XV de Piracicaba and Santos, being a direct substitute for Pelé in several games, until returning to América Mineiro in 1970, when in 1971 he was champion and top scorer for the team. He ended his career at Paysandu in 1973.

== Managerial career ==
Bala began his coaching career in the second division of Minas Gerais in 1976, and then went on to play for América Mineiro's youth team. In 1978 he took over the main team for the first time, remaining until 1979. In 1980, at Londrina, he was champion of the Campeonato Brasileiro Série B that year, making history with the club from the interior of Paraná. He would manage América on other occasions, in addition to Cruzeiro in 1986 and other modest teams from Minas Gerais throughout most of the 90s.

== Personal life ==
In the 2000s, he became a sports commentator for TV Alterosa, one of the main TV stations in Minas Gerais.

== Honours ==
=== Player ===
Palmeiras

- Taça Brasil: 1967

América Mineiro

- Campeonato Mineiro: 1971

Individual

- 1964 Campeonato Mineiro top scorer: 19 goals
- 1971 Campeonato Mineiro top scorer: 14 goals

=== Manager ===
Londrina

- Campeonato Brasileiro Série B: 1980

== Death ==
Jair Bala died in Belo Horizonte, 27 December 2022, aged 79, victim of a stroke.
