= Henrique Frade =

Brazilian footballer (1934-2004)

Personal information
- Full name: Henrique Frade
- Date of birth: 3 August 1934
- Place of birth: Formiga, Brazil
- Date of death: 15 May 2004 (aged 69)
- Place of death: Rio de Janeiro, Brazil
- Position: Striker

Youth career
- 1948–1951: Formiga

Senior career*
Years	Team	Apps	(Gls)
1949–1953	Formiga		
1954–1963	Flamengo	128	(74)
1963	→ Nacional (loan)	18	(10)
1964–1966	Portuguesa de Desportos	23	(8)
1965–1966	→ Atlético Mineiro (loan)	11	(3)
1966–1967	Formiga		

International career
1959–1961	Brazil	4	(3)
- * Club domestic league appearances and goals

Henrique Frade (3 August 1934 – 15 May 2004) was a Brazilian football striker.

Third high scorer in Flamengo's history with 214 goals, Henrique won the 1961 Rio São Paulo Tournament and had 402 appearances for the club between 1954 and 1963.

He also played for Nacional Montevideo, Portuguesa-SP and Atlético Mineiro.

Despite having several caps for Brazil during 1956 and 1957, Henrique was not selected to the 1958 FIFA World Cup due to a sprained foot. Instead, he saw Palmeiras' Mazzola joining his Flamengo's teammates Joel, Moacir, Dida and Zagallo.

He had appearances for Brazil national team between 1951 and 1961.

== Honours ==
- Rio de Janeiro State League: 1954, 1955
- Torneio Rio–São Paulo: 1961
- Uruguayan League: 1963
