= Delém =

Brazilian footballer (1935–2007)

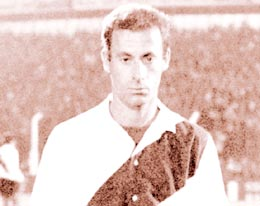
- Delém with River Plate in 1967

Personal information
- Full name: Vladem Lázaro Ruiz Quevedo
- Date of birth: April 15, 1935
- Place of birth: São Paulo, Brazil
- Date of death: March 28, 2007 (aged 71)
- Place of death: Buenos Aires, Argentina
- Position: Forward

Senior career*
Years	Team	Apps	(Gls)
1952–1958	Grêmio		
1958–1961	Vasco da Gama		
1961–1967	River Plate		
1968–1969	Universidad Católica		
1970	America-RJ		

International career
1960	Brazil	7	(5)

Managerial career
- River Plate
- 1975: Huracán
- Argentinos Juniors
- Vélez Sarsfield
- San Lorenzo
- * Club domestic league appearances and goals

Vladem Lázaro Ruiz Quevedo (Note: In this Spanish name, the first or paternal surname is Ruiz and the second or maternal family name is Quevedo.) (April 15, 1935 – March 28, 2007), known as "Delém", was a Brazilian footballer who played as a forward for clubs in Brazil, Argentina and Chile. He played seven games and scored five goals for the Brazil national team, all in 1960.
