= Babá (footballer, born 1934) =

Brazilian footballer (1934–2010)

Personal information
- Full name: Mario Braga Gadelha
- Date of birth: 24 April 1934
- Place of birth: Aracati, Brazil
- Date of death: 8 April 2010 (aged 75)
- Height: 1.54 m (5 ft 1 in)
- Position: Forward

Senior career*
Years	Team	Apps	(Gls)
1952–1953	Ceará		(0)
1953–1962	Flamengo	308	(89)
1962–1967	UNAM		(0)
1968	Ceará		(0)

International career
1961	Brazil	1	(0)
- * Club domestic league appearances and goals

Mario Braga Gadelha (24 April 1934 – 8 April 2010) commonly known as Babá, was a Brazilian former footballer who played as a forward for Ceará, Flamengo and UNAM.

== Career ==
Babá started his professional career in 1952 at the age of sixteen with Ceará. He was later sold in 1953 to Flamengo. He played 308 games and scored 89 goals with Flamengo from 1953 until 1962, when he was sold to Mexican Club Universidad Nacional. In 1961 he was called to the Brazil national football team for a friendly match against Paraguay.

He played with UNAM from 1962, in the club's first season at the Primera División, Mexican football top-flight, to 1967.

After his spell in Mexican football, Babá came back to Brazil where he played for one season with Ceará.

Babá died on 8 April 2010.
