= Hamilton (footballer, born 1931) =

Brazilian footballer

Personal information
- Full name: Hamilton Evangelista dos Santos
- Date of birth: 3 April 1931
- Place of birth: Queimadas, Brazil
- Date of death: 9 December 2011 (aged 80)
- Place of death: Salvador, Brazil
- Position: Attacking midfielder

Senior career*
Years	Team	Apps	(Gls)
1948–1949	Guarany-BA		
1950–1953	Flamengo	20	(9)
1952	→ América-PE (loan)		
1953	Santa Cruz		
1954–1956	Náutico		
1956–1959	Bahia		
1959–1961	América-PE		
1962–1966	Bahia		

International career
1957	Brazil	1	(0)
- * Club domestic league appearances and goals as of 13 May 2024

Hamilton Evangelista dos Santos (3 April 1931 – 9 December 2011), simply known as Hamilton, was a Brazilian professional footballer who played as an attacking midfielder.

== Career ==
Revealed by AD Guarany from the city of Salvador, Hamilton was taken to Flamengo as one of the alternatives to Zizinho's departure. Unable to establish himself, he went to América de Recife where he became top scorer in 1952, and later played for Santa Cruz and Náutico, where he was state champion in 1954, in addition to the Pernambuco state football team. He arrived at Bahia in 1956 where he became the third highest scorer in the club's history with 154 goals.

Hamilton also participated in a match for the Brazil national team, on 18 September 1957, against Chile.

== Honours ==
Náutico

- Campeonato Pernambucano: 1954

Bahia

- Taça Brasil: 1959
- Campeonato Baiano: 1956, 1958, 1962

Individual

- 1952 Campeonato Pernambucano top scorer: 16 goals
