= Ari de Souza =

Brazilian footballer

Ari
Personal information
- Full name: Ari de Souza
- Date of birth: 3 March 1939 (age 87)
- Place of birth: Rio de Janeiro, Brazil
- Position: Forward

Senior career*
Years	Team	Apps	(Gls)
1956–1958	Canto do Rio		
1959–1964	América Mineiro		
1964–1966	Ferroviária		
1966	Comercial-SP		
1966–1967	Francana		
1968–1969	Araxá		

International career
1963	Brazil		
- * Club domestic league appearances and goals

Ari de Souza (born 3 March 1939) is a Brazilian former professional footballer who played as a forward.

== Career ==
Ari de Souza played for Canto do Rio, América Mineiro, Ferroviária, Comercial de Ribeirão Preto, Francana and Araxá. He was part of the Brazilian national team squad that played in the 1963 South American Championship. Ari is in the Ideal Starting XI in the history of América Mineiro, forming the attack alongside Jair Bala and Marco Antônio.
