= Nilo (footballer, born 1932) =

Brazilian footballer

Personal information
- Full name: Nilo Alves da Cunha
- Date of birth: 20 January 1932
- Place of birth: Rio de Janeiro, Brazil
- Date of death: 20 December 2016 (aged 84)
- Place of death: Nilópolis, Brazil
- Position: Left winger

Youth career
- 1951–1953: Flamengo

Senior career*
Years	Team	Apps	(Gls)
1955–1959	Bonsucesso		
1959–1962	America-RJ		
1963–1964	Palmeiras	50	(17)
1964	America-RJ		
1965	Ferroviária		
1965–1967	América-MG		
- * Club domestic league appearances and goals as of 19 February 2024

Nilo Alves da Cunha (20 January 1932 – 20 December 2016), simply known as Nilo, was a Brazilian professional footballer who played as a left winger.

== Career ==
Nilo began his career with Flamengo's amateurs, where he remained until 1953. In 1955, he reached professional football at Bonsucesso, where after standing out, he was traded to America. In 1960 he was part of the Rio champion squad, when in 1962 he received from SE Palmeiras one of the biggest contracts in Brazilian football up to that time, being acquired for more than 500 thousand cruises. At Palmeiras, he was champion in 1963 and made 50 appearances, but due to internal disagreements between club directors who disagreed with the amount spent on the athlete, he ended up returning to America. In 1965 he worked for Ferroviária de Araraquara and ended his career in another América, in Belo Horizonte.

== Personal life ==
After retiring from football, he worked for several years at the Jornal do Brasil newspaper in Rio de Janeiro.

== Honours ==
America-RJ

- Campeonato Carioca: 1960

Palmeiras

- Campeonato Paulista: 1963
