= Nívio Gabrich =

Brazilian footballer (1927–1981)

Personal information
- Full name: Nívio Gabrich
- Date of birth: 7 September 1927
- Place of birth: Santa Luzia, Minas Gerais, Brazil
- Date of death: 16 July 1981 (aged 53)
- Place of death: Belo Horizonte, Brazil
- Height: 1.68 m (5 ft 6 in)
- Position: Forward

Youth career
- Santa Cruz EC

Senior career*
| Years | Team | Apps | (Gls) |
| 1944–1951 | Atlético Mineiro | 182 | (126) |
| 1951–1957 | Bangu | 263 | (144) |
| 1958–1959 | Cruzeiro | | |
- * Club domestic league appearances and goals as of 28 February 2024

Nívio Gabrich (7 September 1927 – 16 July 1981) was a Brazilian professional footballer who played as a forward.

== Career ==
One of Atlético Mineiro's main players in the 1940s, Gabrich began his career in the amateur ranks of Santa Cruz EC. For Atlético Mineiro, he made 182 appearances and scored 126 goals, becoming Minas Gerais champion five times and top scorer in 1950. He also played for Bangu AC in the 1950s and ended his career at Cruzeiro.

== Honours ==
Atlético Mineiro

- Campeonato Mineiro: 1946, 1947, 1949, 1950, 1952

Bangu

- Torneio Início do Rio-São Paulo: 1951
- Torneio Início Carioca: 1955

Cruzeiro

- Campeonato Mineiro: 1959

Individual

- 1950 Campeonato Mineiro top scorer: 13 goals
