= Gilson Gênio =

Brazilian footballer (1957–2017)

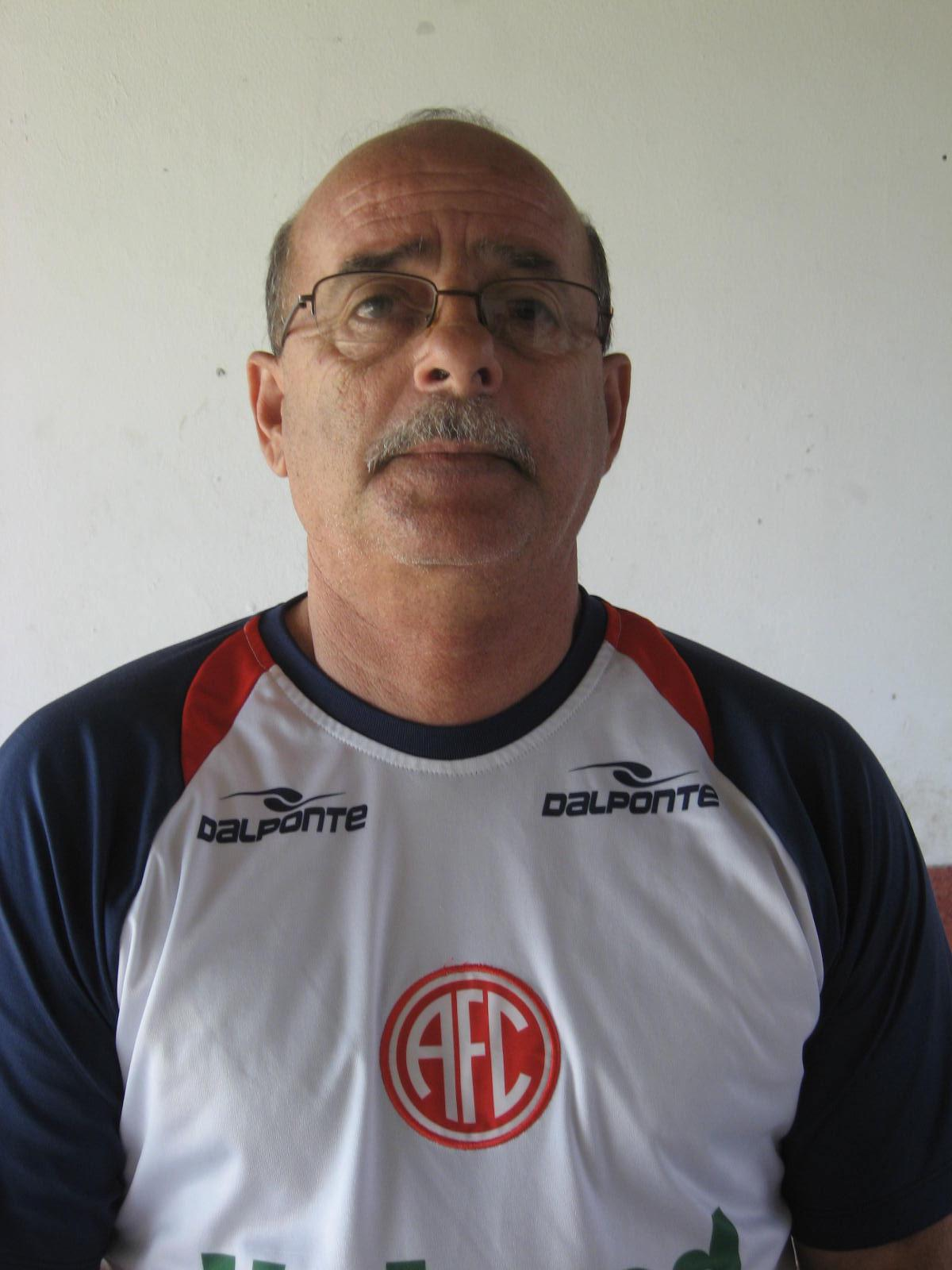
Gilson Wilson Francisco

Gilson Wilson Francisco (20 June 1957 – 28 May 2017) was a Brazilian football player and manager.

== Club career ==
He started his playing career with Brazilian side Fluminense.

== International career ==
He played for the Rio de Janeiro state football team.

== Post-playing career ==
After retiring from playing professional football, he worked as a pastor and professional football manager.
