= Maurinho (footballer, born 1933) =

Brazilian footballer

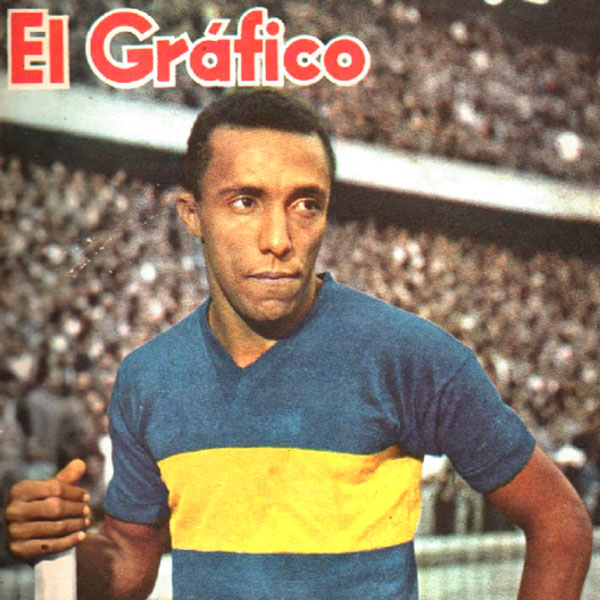
- Mauro Raphael Maurinho in El Gráfico of 1961

Personal information
- Full name: Mauro Raphael
- Date of birth: 6 June 1933
- Place of birth: Araraquara, Brazil
- Date of death: 28 June 1995 (aged 62)
- Position: Striker

Senior career*
| Years | Team | Apps | (Gls) |
| 1951 | Guarani | | |
| 1952–1959 | São Paulo | | |
| 1959–1960 | Fluminense | | |
| 1961–1962 | Boca Juniors | 10 | (1) |
| 1963 | Vasco da Gama | | |
| 1963 | Fluminense | | |

International career
| 1954–1957 | Brazil | 12 | (4) |
- * Club domestic league appearances and goals

Mauro Raphael, also known as Maurinho (6 June 1933 – 28 June 1995) was a Brazilian football player. He played for the Brazil national team in the 1954 FIFA World Cup.

== Honours ==
São Paulo

- Campeonato Paulista: 1953, 1957
