= Jorge Mendonça (footballer, born 1954) =

Brazilian footballer

Personal information
- Full name: Jorge Pinto Mendonça
- Date of birth: June 6, 1954
- Place of birth: Silva Jardim, Brazil
- Date of death: February 17, 2006 (aged 51)
- Place of death: Campinas, Brazil
- Position: Striker

Senior career*
| Years | Team | Apps | (Gls) |
| 1971–1973 | Bangu | | |
| 1973–1976 | Náutico | 46 | (24) |
| 1976–1980 | Palmeiras | 56 | (30) |
| 1980 | Vasco da Gama | 16 | (8) |
| 1980–1982 | Guarani | 20 | (13) |
| 1983–1985;1989 | Ponte Preta | 28 | (8) |
| 1985–1986 | Cruzeiro | | |
| 1986 | Rio Branco-ES | 10 | (1) |
| 1987–1989 | Colorado-PR | | |
| 1989–1991 | Lousano Paulista | | |

International career
| 1978 | Brazil | 6 | (0) |
- * Club domestic league appearances and goals

Jorge Pinto Mendonça (June 6, 1954 – February 17, 2006) was a Brazilian footballer during the 1970s and 1980s, playing in a striker role.

== Career ==
Born in Silva Jardim, he scored 417 goals during his career (1972–1991). With Brazilian team he played 6 official games without scoring any goals (he was Zico reserve in 1978 FIFA World Cup). He won the São Paulo State Championship in 1976 and was the top goalscorer in the same tournament in 1981 - 38 goals by Guarani. After he retired he suffered of financial, healthy and familiar problems. However, in his last years, he directed a childcare project of Guarani. He died at Hospital Mário Gatti, in Campinas, at 51 years old from a heart attack in Campinas. Jorge Mendonça is buried in Cemitério das Acácias in Valinhos, city next to Campinas, São Paulo.

== Awards ==
Náutico

- Campeonato Pernambucano: 1974

Palmeiras

- Campeonato Paulista: 1976
- Campeonato Brasileiro runner-up: 1978

Guarani

- Campeonato Brasileiro Série B: 1981
