= Toquinho (footballer) =

Brazilian footballer (born 1957)

Personal information
- Full name: Luiz Carlos Lombardi
- Date of birth: 24 August 1957 (age 69)
- Place of birth: Rio Grande, Brazil
- Positions: Forward; winger

Youth career
- Rio Grande

Senior career*
Years	Team	Apps	(Gls)
1976	Rio Grande		
1976–1978	Grêmio		
1978–1979	São Paulo-RS		
1980–1985	Portuguesa	273	(42)
1986	Londrina		
1987–1989	Ferroviária		
1989	Campinense		
1990	Figueirense		
1991	São Paulo-RS		
1991	Inter de Santa Maria		
1992	São Paulo-RS		
1993–1994	Rio Grande		

Managerial career
- 2014: São Paulo-RS
- * Club domestic league appearances and goals as of 1 February 2024

Luiz Carlos Lombardi (born 24 August 1957), better known as Toquinho, is a Brazilian former professional footballer who played as a forward and winger.

== Career ==
Pointed out by many as the main player of Portuguesa de Desportos in the 80s, Toquinho was the highlight of the state runner-up team in 1985. He made 276 appearances for the club and scored 42 goals. Born in the city of Rio Grande, he also has a strong relationship with the city's teams, the veteran SC Rio Grande and SC São Paulo, having been football director for Rio Grande and coach for the São Paulo in 2014.
