= Paulo Egídio =

Brazilian footballer (born 1964)

Paulo Egídio Bertollazzi (born 10 February 1964) is a Brazilian former footballer who played as a winger.

== Early life ==
He was born in 1964 in Pradópolis, Brazil.

== Club career ==
He started his career with Brazilian side Botafogo-SP.

== International career ==
He played for the São Paulo state football team and the Brazil national football team.

== Style of play ==
He was known for his speed.

== Post-playing career ==
After retiring from professional football, he worked as a sports secretary.
