= Décio Esteves =

Brazilian footballer and manager

Personal information
- Full name: Décio Esteves da Silva
- Date of birth: May 21, 1927
- Place of birth: Rio de Janeiro, Brazil
- Date of death: December 25, 2000 (aged 73)

Senior career*
Years	Team	Apps	(Gls)
1950–1962	Bangu		
1962–1964	Campo Grande		
1965	Olaria		

International career
1959–1960	Brazil		

Managerial career
- 1981: Carlos Renaux
- 1982: Campo Grande
- * Club domestic league appearances and goals

Décio Esteves da Silva (21 May 1927, in Rio de Janeiro – 25 December 2000, in Rio de Janeiro) was a Brazilian international football player and coach.

== Biography ==
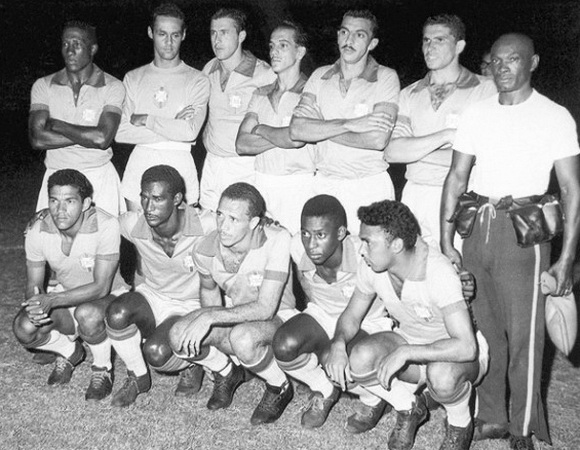
Campeonato Sudamericano 1959 Back: Djalma Santos, Gilmar, Bellini, Décio Esteves, Formiga, Coronel, Masseur Mário Américo;Front: Garrincha, Didi, Paulo Valentim, Pelé, Chinesinho

The technically adept and flexible player was used primarily in midfield. From 1950 until 1962 he was amongst the ranks of Bangu AC, a club from the west of Rio de Janeiro, joining the club the same year like the legendary Zizinho. With 221 matches and 88 goals Dézio Esteves belongs to the outstanding players in the history of Bangu with which he achieved 1951 the second place of the State Championship of Rio under the stewardship of the Uruguayan champion coach Ondino Viera. With coach Tim Bangu reached a third place in this competition in 1959. In the year after he won alongside Zózimo and Ademir da Guia the 1960 edition of the International Soccer League in New York, a tournament with the participation of the then English champions Burnley FC and a number of other reputable European sides. This win has since become part of the clubs folklore and is often happily interpreted as a club world championship.

In 1962 Décio Esteves joined Campo Grande AC, another western Rio side, which had just ascended to the first division of the state championship for the first time. In 1965 he ended his playing years with Olaria AC in the north of the town.

With the Brazil national football team he participated in the 1959 South American Championship in Buenos Aires, where the Seleção finished undefeated second behind the hosts. In 1960 Décio Esteves was part of the team that defeated Argentina in Buenos Aires 4-1 after extra time, winning the Copa Roca, a then regular tournament series between the two countries, for Brazil. Between 1959 and 1960 he played in total three times for his country.

Later he worked as coach for CA Carlos Renaux in Brusque in the state of Santa Catarina. In 1982, he led Campo Grande to victory in the Taça de Prata, the second level of the national Brazilian Championship and thus ascension to the first level, which marks the peak in the club's history.

2006, almost six years after his death, a state law - Lei № 3567/2006, Estado do Rio de Janeiro - gave approval to the renaming of a popular restaurant in Campo Grande, the neighbourhood of his birth, in his honour. In context his long presidency of the local Clube dos Aliados, a sports and social club, was emphasised. His tenure was marked by notable improvements to its structure such as the erection of the current seat, a gymnasium and a pool. His marriage, lasting for more than half of a century, also found mention.
