= Rubens (footballer, born 1928) =

Brazilian footballer

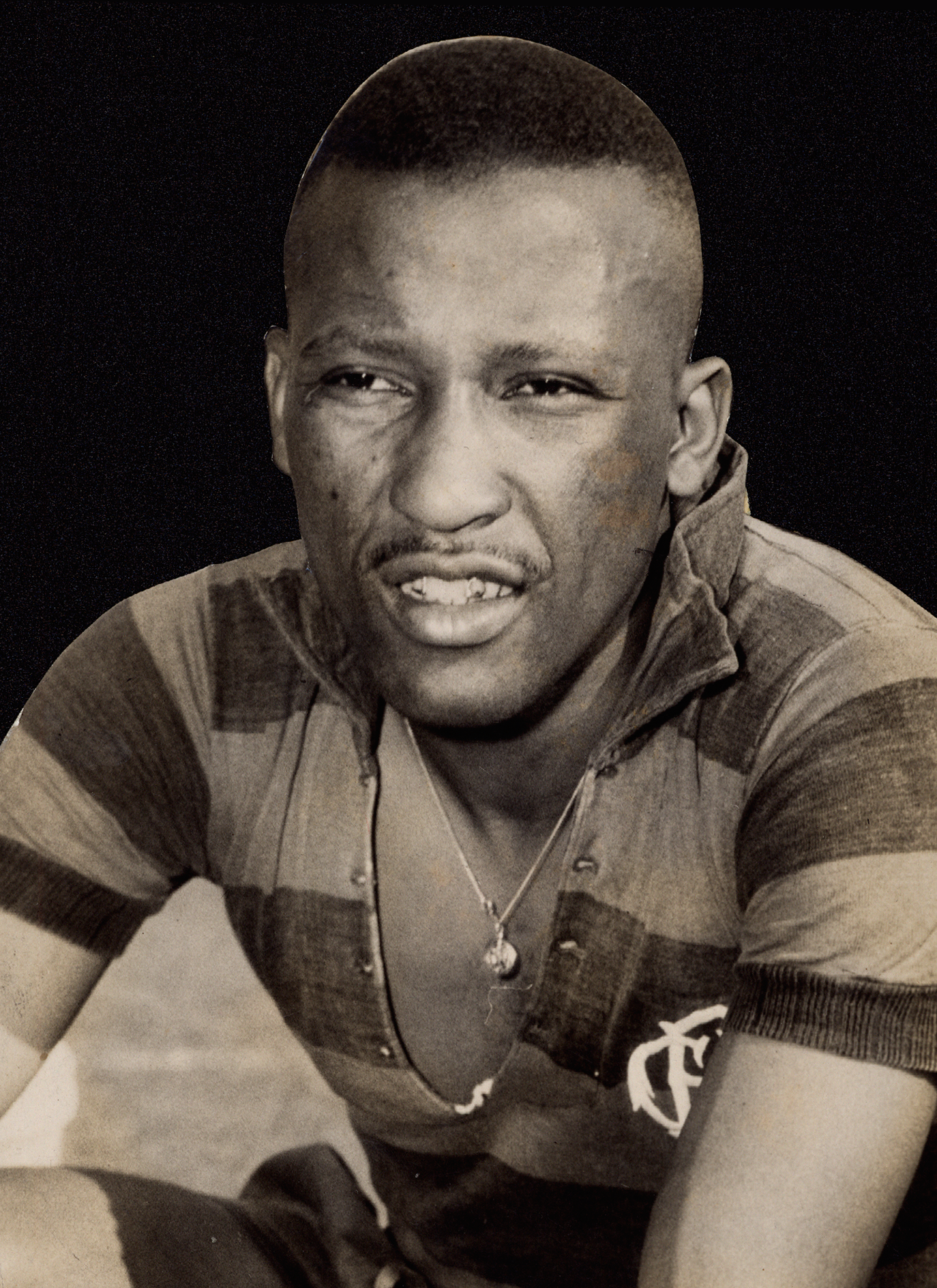

Personal information
- Full name: Rubens Josué da Costa
- Date of birth: 24 November 1928
- Place of birth: São Paulo, Brazil
- Date of death: 31 May 1987 (aged 58)
- Place of death: Rio de Janeiro, Brazil
- Positions: Attacking midfielder; forward

Youth career
- 1945–1947: Ypiranga

Senior career*
Years	Team	Apps	(Gls)
1947–1950	Ypiranga	67	(25)
1951	Portuguesa Desportos	6	(1)
1951–1957	Flamengo	77	(43)
1956–1957	→ Santa Cruz (loan)	1	(0)
1957–1959	Vasco da Gama	42	(16)
1960–1963	Prudentina		

International career
1952–1954	Brazil	1	(0)
- * Club domestic league appearances and goals

Rubens Josué da Costa (24 November 1928 – 31 May 1991) was a Brazilian football player. He was included in the Brazil national football team at the 1954 FIFA World Cup finals.

Rubens played club football for Ypiranga-SP, Flamengo, Vasco da Gama, Portuguesa Desportos, Santa Cruz-PE, and Prudentina, winning the Campeonato Carioca in 1953, 1954 and 1955 with Flamengo and in 1958 with Vasco da Gama.

== Honours ==
Flamengo

- Campeonato Carioca: 1953, 1954, 1955

Vasco da Gama

- Campeonato Carioca: 1958
- Torneio Rio–São Paulo: 1958

Brazil

- Panamerican Championship: 1952
