= Babá (footballer, born 1944) =

Brazilian footballer

Personal information
- Full name: Roberto Caveanha
- Date of birth: 7 July 1944 (age 82)
- Place of birth: Mogi Guaçu, Brazil
- Position: Forward

Youth career
- 1962–1964: Guarani

Senior career*
Years	Team	Apps	(Gls)
1964–1965	Guarani		
1966–1971	São Paulo	216	(94)
1971	Barcelona		
1971–1974	Guarani		
1975	São Bento		
1976–1977	Colorado-PR		

International career
1968	Brazil	1	(1)
- * Club domestic league appearances and goals as of 29 August 2023

Roberto Caveanha (born 7 July 1944), better known as Babá, is a Brazilian former professional footballer who played as forward.

== Career ==
Babá drew attention when he was featured in a 5–1 victory for Guarani against Santos, with Pelé in field. Hired by São Paulo, he stayed at the club until he had problems with the club manager Zezé Moreira, when he returned to Guarani for the second time.

=== International career ===
Babá just be called up for Brazil in the friendly match against Yugoslavia, 17 December 1968, and scored one goal.

== Honours ==
=== São Paulo ===
- Campeonato Paulista: 1970

=== Barcelona ===
- Campeonato Ecuatoriano de Fútbol Serie A: 1971
