= Ivair (footballer) =

Brazilian footballer (1945–2024)

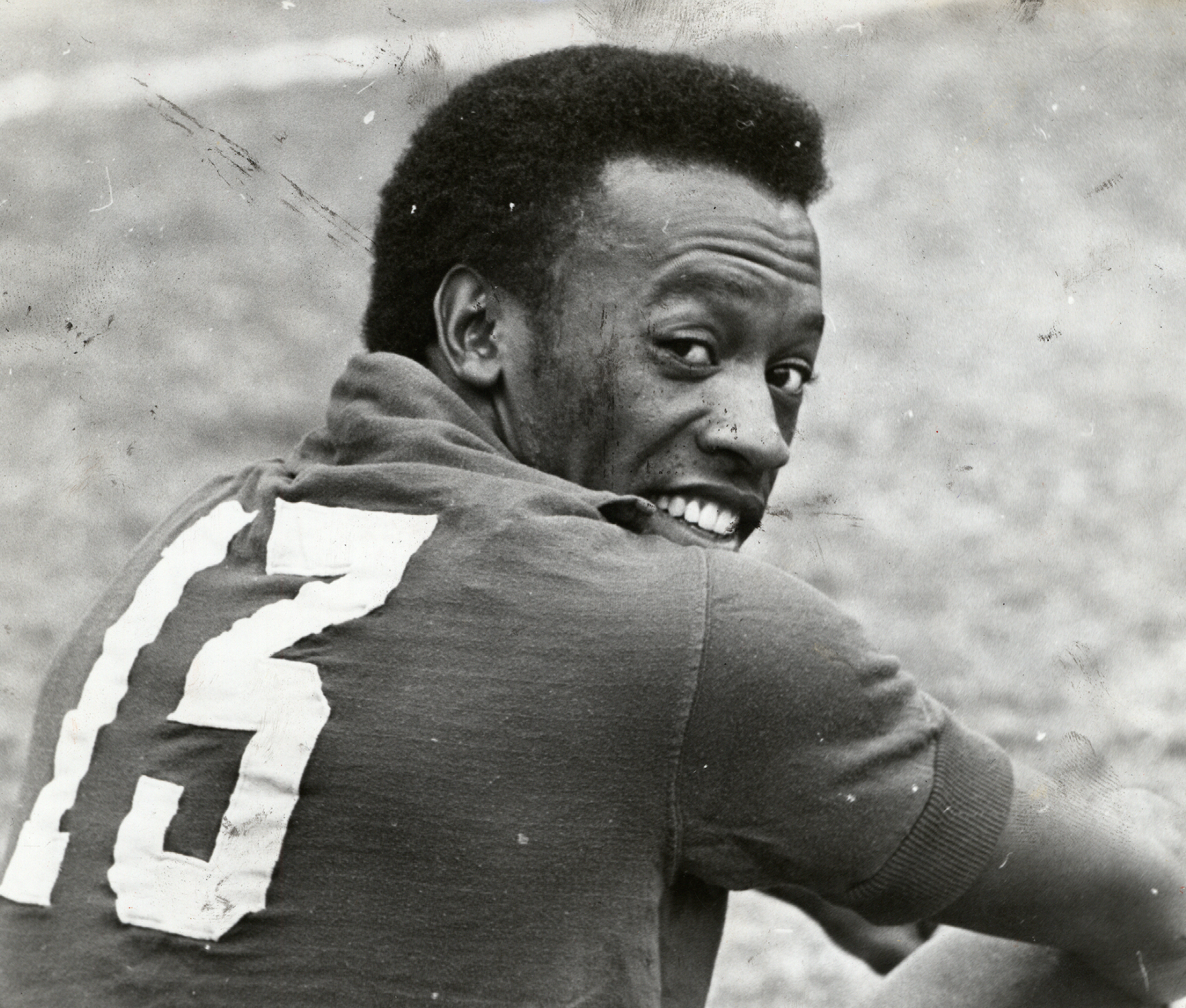
- Ivair in 1972

Personal information
- Full name: Ivair Ferreira
- Date of birth: 21 January 1945
- Place of birth: Bauru, São Paulo, Brazil
- Date of death: 15 August 2024 (aged 79)
- Place of death: São Paulo, Brazil
- Position: Striker

Senior career*
Years	Team	Apps	(Gls)
1963–1969	Portuguesa		
1970	Corinthians		
1971–1975	Fluminense		
1975	América (RJ)		
1975	Paysandu (PA)		
1975–1978	Toronto Metros-Croatia	84	(21)
1979	Toronto Blizzard	21	(1)
1979	Toronto Panhellenic		
1980	Cleveland Cobras		
- Kansas City Stars
- Boston Athletic
- Los Angeles Aztecs
- América (RJ)

International career
1966	Brazil	1	(0)
- * Club domestic league appearances and goals

Ivair Ferreira (21 January 1945 – 14 August 2024), known as Ivair, was a Brazilian footballer who played as a striker in Brazil for Portuguesa, Corinthians, Fluminense, América (RJ), and Paysandu (PA). He then played in the NASL between 1975 and 1979 for the Toronto Metros-Croatia, and Toronto Blizzard, scoring the final goal in their 3–0 victory over Minnesota in the 1976 Soccer Bowl . In late 1979, he played in the National Soccer League with Toronto Panhellenic. He later played in the United States for the Cleveland Cobras, Kansas City Stars, Boston Athletic and Los Angeles Aztecs, before returning to Brazil with América. He earned one cap with the Brazil national team in 1966. Ivair died of cancer in São Paulo, on 15 August 2024, at the age of 79.
