= Almir Pernambuquinho =

Brazilian footballer (1937–1973)

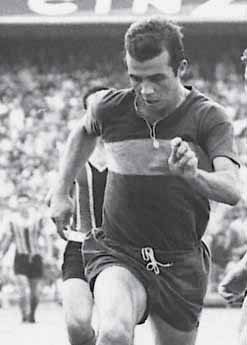

Personal information
- Full name: Almir Moraes de Albuquerque
- Date of birth: 28 October 1937
- Place of birth: Recife, Brazil
- Date of death: 6 February 1973 (aged 35)
- Place of death: Rio de Janeiro, Brazil
- Position: Forward

Senior career*
Years	Team	Apps	(Gls)
1956	Sport Recife		
1957–1960	Vasco da Gama		
1960–1961	Corinthians		
1961–1962	Boca Juniors		
1962	Fiorentina		
1962–1963	Genova		
1963–1964	Santos		
1965–1967	Flamengo		
1967–1968	América-RJ		

International career
1959–1960	Brazil	6	(1)
- * Club domestic league appearances and goals

Almir Moraes de Albuquerque (28 October 1937 – 6 February 1973), known as Almir Pernambuquinho, was a Brazilian footballer who played as a forward for clubs of Brazil, Argentina and Italy. Almir Pernambuquinho is, by many considered, the inventor of the fute-vôlei. He played for the Brazil national football team in the Copa América Argentina 1959. He was killed in a bar in 1973.

== Honours ==
=== Club ===
Vasco da Gama

- Tournoi de Paris (1): 1957
- Troféu Teresa Herrera (1): 1958
- Campeonato Carioca (1): 1958
- Torneio Rio–São Paulo (1): 1958

Boca Juniors

- Primera División Argentina (1): 1962

Santos

- Campeonato Paulista (1): 1964
- Torneio Rio–São Paulo (2): 1963, 1964
- Campeonato Brasileiro Série A (2): 1963, 1964
- Copa Libertadores (1): 1963
- Internacontinental Cup (1): 1963

Flamengo

- Campeonato Carioca (1): 1965

=== International ===
Brazil

- Taça do Atlântico (1): 1960 (vs. Argentina)
- Roca Cup (1): 1960 (vs. Argentina)
