= Leônidas da Selva =

Brazilian footballer (1927–1985)

Personal information
- Full name: Manoel Pereira
- Date of birth: 3 January 1927
- Place of birth: Biguaçu, Brazil
- Date of death: 23 April 1985 (aged 58)
- Place of death: Matinhos, Brazil
- Position: Forward

Youth career
- 1939–1940: Flamengo-SC

Senior career*
Years	Team	Apps	(Gls)
1941–1943	Lauro Müller		
1944–1946	Palestra Itália-PR		
1946–1951	Avaí		
1952–1959	America-RJ		

International career
1956	Brazil	6	(1)
- * Club domestic league appearances and goals

Manoel Pereira (3 January 1927 – 23 April 1985), mostly known by the nickname Leônidas da Selva, was a Brazilian professional footballer who played as a forward.

== Nickname origin ==
Manoel earned the nickname "Leônidas da Selva" from journalist Sandro Moreira, a joke on the player's physical resemblance to Leônidas da Silva, but having a totally ferocious style of play on the field (in Portuguese, "Selva" means jungle).

== Career ==
Started his career in Santa Catarina, played for Flamengo de Estreito and Lauro Müller. After, played for Palestra Itália de Curitiba and Avaí FC. In 1952, arrived at America, a club with which he had national recognition which earned him six call ups for the Brazil national team in 1956.

He scored an unusual goal on an America trip to Turkey, where he scored with his heel, supporting his body weight on his hands.

== Honours ==
America

- Campeonato Carioca runner-up: 1955

Brazil

- Taça Oswaldo Cruz: 1956
- Taça do Atlântico: 1956
