= Moacir (footballer, born 1936) =

Brazilian footballer

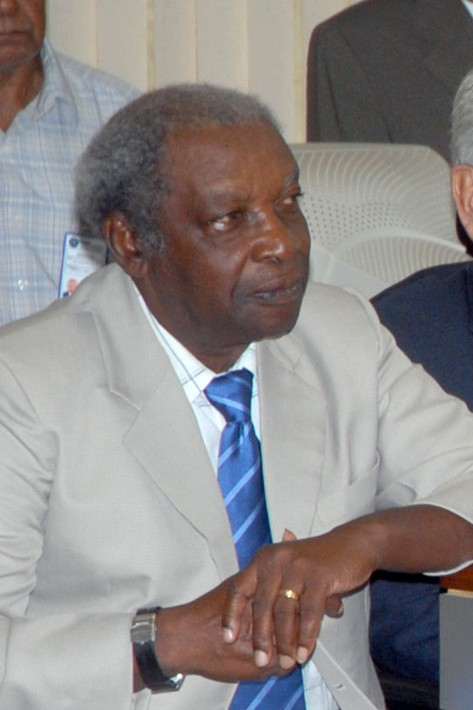
- Moacir in 2008

Personal information
- Full name: Moacyr Claudino Pinto da Silva
- Date of birth: 18 May 1936 (age 90)
- Place of birth: São Paulo, Brazil
- Positions: Midfielder; inside forward

Senior career*
Years	Team	Apps	(Gls)
1956–1961	Flamengo	92	(31)
1961–1962	River Plate	28	(7)
1962–1963	Peñarol	4	(1)
1964–1965	Everest	34	(14)
1965–1970	Barcelona		
1970–1974	C.A. Mannucci		

International career
1957–1960	Brazil	6	(2)
Medal record
Men's Football
Representing Brazil
FIFA World Cup
Winner	1958 Sweden
- * Club domestic league appearances and goals

Moacyr Claudino Pinto da Silva (born 18 May 1936 in São Paulo), nicknamed Moacir or Moacyr, is a Brazilian former footballer who played as a midfielder or forward.

== Early life ==
Son of railman, Moacir ran away from home and lived for more than ten years in an orphanage in Osasco.

Recommended by a friend, he went to CR Flamengo to be part of the youth teams, where he started to live in the club dorms.

He still resides in Guayaquil City, where he raised his family.

== Club career ==
After his time as a junior player, Moacir highlighted and was selected to be part of the principal team of CR Flamengo.

Later in his career, he also played for Flamengo, River Plate of Argentina, Peñarol of Uruguay, and Everest and Barcelona of Ecuador.

== International career ==
Moacir earned 6 caps and scored 2 goals for the Brazil national football team between 1957 and 1960. He was part of the 1958 FIFA World Cup winning squad, but he did not play during the tournament, mainly serving as reserve for Didi.

== Honours ==
=== Club ===
Flamengo

- Torneio Rio–São Paulo: 1961

Peñarol

- Uruguayan Primera División: 1962

Barcelona de Guayaquil

- Ecuadorian Serie A: 1966

=== International ===
Brazil

- FIFA World Cup: 1958
