= Alfredo (footballer, born 1946) =

Brazilian footballer (1946–2025)

Personal information
- Full name: Alfredo Mostarda Filho
- Date of birth: 18 October 1946
- Place of birth: São Paulo, Brazil
- Date of death: 28 March 2025 (aged 78)
- Position: Defender

Senior career*
Years	Team	Apps	(Gls)
1965	Palmeiras		
1966	Cruzeiro		
1967–1968	Palmeiras		
1969	Marcílio Dias		
1970–1971	Nacional		
1971	América Rio Preto		
1972–1975	Palmeiras		
1976	Coritiba		
1977–1978	Santos		
1978–1980	Palmeiras		
1980–1983	Taubaté		
1984	Jorge Wilstermann		

International career
1974	Brazil	2	(0)
- * Club domestic league appearances and goals

Alfredo Mostarda Filho (18 October 1946 – 28 March 2025), simply known as Alfredo, was a Brazilian professional footballer who played as a defender.

== Career ==
Born in São Paulo, Alfredo played for Palmeiras, Cruzeiro, Marcílio Dias, Nacional, América Rio Preto, Coritiba, Santos, Taubaté. He had a brief spell abroad for the Bolivian football club Jorge Wilstermann in 1984. Alfredo played for the Brazil national team twice, both in 1974, with his second match for Brazil coming at the 1974 FIFA World Cup in a 1–0 loss against the Poland team.

== Death ==
Alfredo died on 28 March 2025, at the age of 78.
