= Osvaldo Cunha =

Brazilian footballer (1943–2024)

Personal information
- Full name: Osvaldo Domingues da Cunha
- Date of birth: 22 April 1943
- Place of birth: Pedreira, São Paulo, Brazil
- Date of death: 27 February 2024 (aged 80)
- Place of death: Pedreira, São Paulo, Brazil
- Position: Right-back

Youth career
- EC Santa Sofia (Pedreira)

Senior career*
Years	Team	Apps	(Gls)
1961–1964	Guarani		
1965–1967	São Paulo	77	(1)
1967–1970	Corinthians	64	(1)
1971–1972	América Mineiro		
- * Club domestic league appearances and goals

Osvaldo Cunha (22 April 1943 – 27 February 2024) was a Brazilian professional footballer who played as a right-back.

== Career ==
Cunha began his career playing for the amateur Santa Sofia in his hometown. Played for Guarani, São Paulo and Corinthians in the 1960s, as well as América Mineiro in the early 1970s. His style of play stood out for his strong physical imposition. After retiring, he was a football teacher in youth categories of several clubs.

== Death ==
Cunha died on 27 February 2024, at the age of 80.

== Honours ==
América Mineiro

- Campeonato Mineiro: 1971
