= Servílio (footballer, born 1939) =

Brazilian footballer

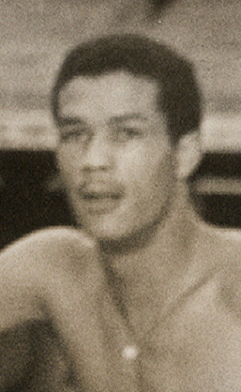
- Servílio in 1960

Personal information
- Full name: Servílio de Jesus Filho
- Date of birth: 15 October 1939
- Place of birth: São Paulo, Brazil
- Date of death: 8 June 2005 (aged 65)
- Place of death: São Paulo, Brazil
- Height: 1.84 m (6 ft 1/2 in)
- Position: Striker

Senior career*
Years	Team	Apps	(Gls)
1957–1958	ADAP-SP		
1958–1963	Portuguesa	412	(142)
1963–1969	Palmeiras	356	(139)
1969–1971	Corinthians		
1971	Atlas		
1972	Paulista-SP		
1972–1977	Nacional-SP		
1977	Valencia		

International career
1959–1966	Brazil	9	(5)
- * Club domestic league appearances and goals

Servílio de Jesus Filho (15 October 1939 – 8 June 2005), also known as "Servílio", was a Brazilian football striker who played for several clubs in the Campeonato Brasileiro Série A. He also had a brief spell in the Mexican Primera División.

== Career ==
Born in São Paulo, Servílio was a product of the Associação Portuguesa de Desportos youth system. He began playing professional football with Associação Desportiva Araraquara before he returned to play for Portuguesa's senior side in 1957.

Servílio enjoyed his greatest success with his next club, Sociedade Esportiva Palmeiras. He won the Campeonato Paulista twice (in 1963 and 1966) and Campeonato Brasileiro Série A in 1967 (Torneio Roberto Gomes Pedrosa) and 1967 (Taça Brasil).

Servílio moved to Mexico to play for Club Atlas during the 1970–71 season. He returned to Brazil for a few seasons with Paulista Futebol Clube and Nacional Atlético Clube and finished his career in Venezuela playing for Valencia F.C.

Servílio died from a heart attack in São Paulo at age 65.

== Personal life ==
Servílio is son of the also footballer Servílio de Jesús.

== Honours ==
Palmeiras

- Campeonato Brasileiro Série A: 1967 (taça Brasil), 1967 (Roberto Gomes Pedrosa)
- Torneio Rio–São Paulo: 1965
- Campeonato Paulista:1963, 1966
- Copa Libertadores runner-up: 1968
