= Luizinho (footballer, born 1930) =

Brazilian footballer

Personal information
- Full name: Luiz Trochillo
- Date of birth: 7 March 1930
- Place of birth: São Paulo, Brazil
- Date of death: 17 January 1998 (aged 67)
- Place of death: São Paulo, Brazil
- Height: 1.65 m (5 ft 5 in)
- Position: Attacking midfielder

Youth career
- 1943–1948: Corinthians

Senior career*
Years	Team	Apps	(Gls)
1948–1962; 1964–1967	Corinthians	605	(172)
1963	Juventus		

International career
1955–1957	Brazil	11	(1)
- * Club domestic league appearances and goals

Luíz Trochillo, best known as Luizinho and named by fans as Pequeno Polegar (7 March 1930 – 17 January 1998) was an association footballer who played as a striker.

He played entire career (1949–1967) with Corinthians, except in season 1962–63 when play for Clube Atlético Juventus. He won three São Paulo State Championship in 1951, 1952 and 1954. He died at 67 years old.
