= Joel (footballer, born 1931) =

Brazilian footballer (1931–2003)

Personal information
- Full name: Joel Antônio Martins
- Date of birth: 23 November 1931
- Place of birth: Rio de Janeiro, Brazil
- Date of death: 1 January 2003 (aged 71)
- Position: Winger

Youth career
- 1948–1951: Botafogo

Senior career*
Years	Team	Apps	(Gls)
1951	Botafogo	0	(0)
1951–1958	Flamengo	157	(58)
1958–1961	Valencia CF	57	(16)
1961–1963	Flamengo	46	(4)
1963–1964	Vitória		

International career
1957–1961	Brazil	14	(3)
Medal record
Men's Football
Representing Brazil
FIFA World Cup
Winner	1958 Sweden
Copa América
Runner-up	1957 Peru
- * Club domestic league appearances and goals

Joel Antônio Martins (23 November 1931 – 1 January 2003), known as just Joel, was an association football winger.

== Biography ==
Joel was born 23 November 1931 in Rio de Janeiro. His football career began when he was discovered by Botafogo in 1948, at the age of 17 years. Two years later, however, he moved to Flamengo where he won the Rio State Championship for three times in a row (1953, 1954, 1955).

Joel had caps for Brazil between 1957 and 1961. He was in the starting line-up on the first two matches of 1958 FIFA World Cup, but then he went to the bench replaced by Garrincha, just like his Flamengo's teammate Dida was replaced by Pelé.

== Honours ==
Flamengo

- Rio State Championship: 1953, 1954, 1955
- Rio-São Paulo Tournament: 1961

Vitória

- Campeonato Baiano: 1964

Brazil

- FIFA World Cup: 1958
