= Zezinho (footballer, born June 1930) =

Brazilian footballer

Personal information
- Full name: Moyses Ferreira Alves
- Date of birth: 2 June 1930
- Place of birth: Vitória, Brazil
- Date of death: 14 August 1980 (aged 50)
- Position: Forward

Youth career
- 1946: Vitória

Senior career*
Years	Team	Apps	(Gls)
1947	Rio Branco		
1948–1953	Botafogo		
1954–1955	Flamengo		
1955–1956	São Paulo		
1957–1958	Portuguesa		
1958–1959	Corinthians		
1959	Santa Cruz		
1960	Santos		
1961	América-SP		
1961–1962	Santa Cruz		
1963–1966	Rio Branco		

International career
1956	Brazil	3	(1)
- * Club domestic league appearances and goals

Moyses Ferreira Alves (2 June 1930 – 14 August 1980), better known as Zezinho, was a Brazilian footballer who played as a forward. He played in three matches for the Brazil national team in 1956. He was also part of Brazil's squad for the 1956 South American Championship.
