= Vaguinho (footballer, born 1950) =

Brazilian footballer

Personal information
- Full name: Wagno de Freitas
- Date of birth: 11 February 1950 (age 76)
- Place of birth: Sete Lagoas, Brazil
- Height: 1.70 m (5 ft 7 in)
- Position: Winger

Youth career
- Democrata-SL

Senior career*
| Years | Team | Apps | (Gls) |
| 1968–1971 | Atlético Mineiro | | |
| 1971–1981 | Corinthians | 551 | (110) |
| 1981 | Atlético Mineiro | | |
| 1982 | Santo André | | |
| 1983–1985 | Ponte Preta | | |

International career
| 1968–1973 | Brazil | 7 | (1) |
- * Club domestic league appearances and goals as of 23 October 2023

Wagno de Freitas (born 11 February 1950), better known as Vaguinho, is a Brazilian former professional footballer who played as a winger.

== Career ==
Vaguinho is also the seventh athlete with the most appearances for SC Corinthians with 551 matches. and was a key player in the title of the 1977 Campeonato Paulista, considered one of the most important in the club's history. At Atlético Mineiro, he participated in the state champion squads in 1970 and 1981, making 213 appearances and scoring 56 goals in his two spells.

== International career ==
Vaguinho played 7 games for the Brazil national team, scoring one goal, on his debut against Yugoslavia in 1968.

== Honours ==
Atlético Mineiro

- Campeonato Mineiro: 1970, 1981

Corinthians

- Campeonato Paulista: 1977, 1979

Brazil

- Copa Roca: 1971

Individual

- 1970 Bola de Prata
