= Índio (footballer, born 1931) =

Brazilian footballer (1931–2020)

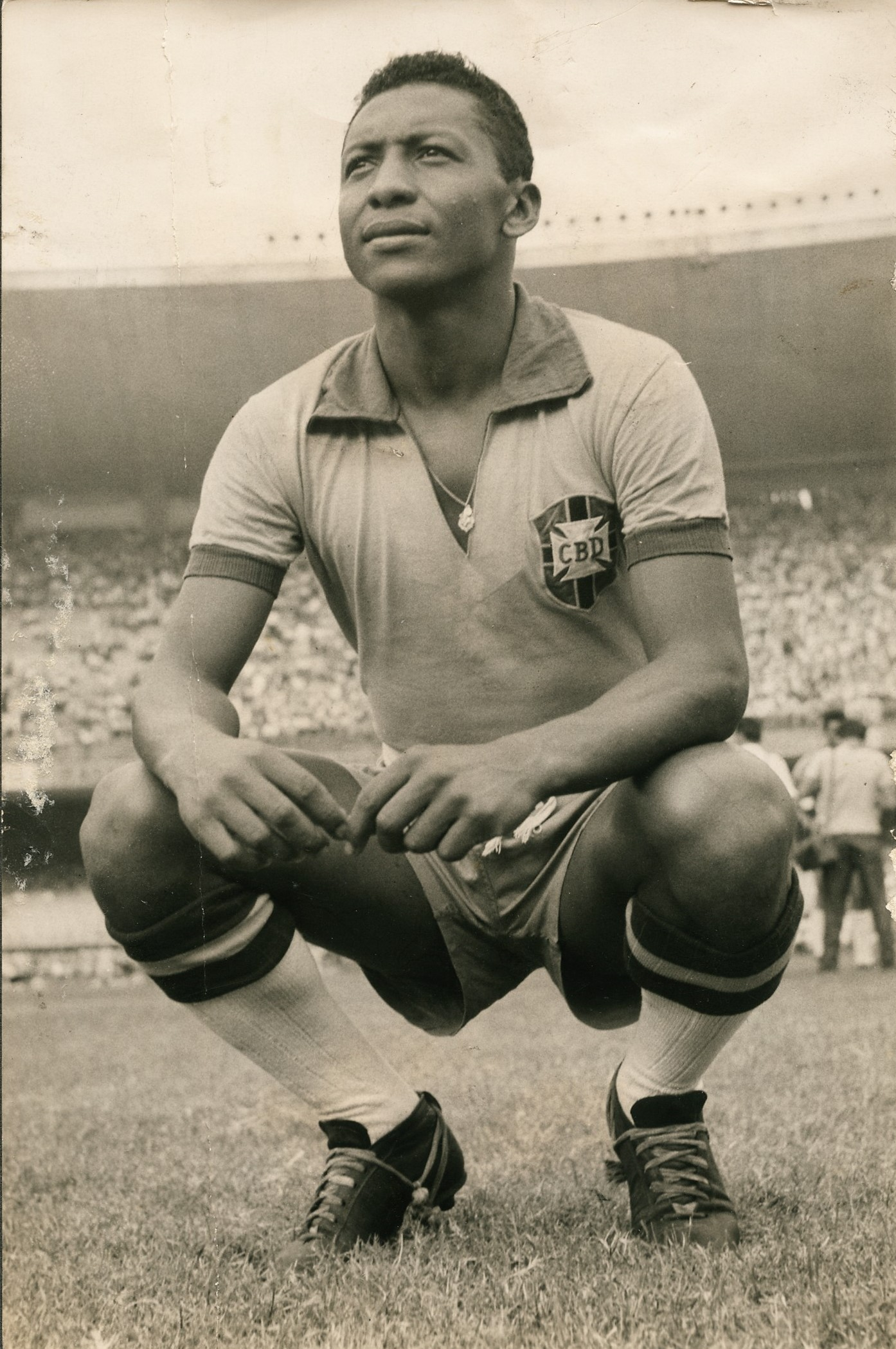
- Índio playing for the Brazil National Team in 1956.

Personal information
- Full name: Aluísio Francisco da Luz
- Date of birth: 1 March 1931
- Place of birth: Cabedelo, Brazil
- Date of death: 19 April 2020 (aged 89)
- Position: Striker

Youth career
- 1947–1949: Bangu
- 1949–1950: Flamengo

Senior career*
Years	Team	Apps	(Gls)
1951–1957	Flamengo	107	(88)
1957–1959	Corinthians	51	(32)
1959–1963	Espanyol	69	(27)
1963–1965	Lusitano Évora	16	(4)
1964–1965	→ Sanjoanense (loan)		
1965	America FC	2	(1)

International career
1954–1957	Brazil	7	(2)
- * Club domestic league appearances and goals

Aluísio Francisco da Luz (1 March 1931 – 19 April 2020), simply known as Índio, was a Brazilian footballer. He was born in Cabedelo, Paraíba.

A striker, Índio won the Rio State Championship title with Flamengo in 1953, 1954 and 1955. He also played for the Brazil national football team at the 1954 FIFA World Cup finals. Índio was the last surviving member of Brazil's 1954 World Cup squad.

== Club career ==
Índio was one of the main strikers of CR Flamengo in his era. He played for almost eight years in the club and his average goal was one goal every two matches, having managed to enter the select list of top 10 scorers in the history of the club. In the Gávea team, he debuted in a match against São Paulo FC, replacing the great Durval.

Then he went on a tour in Europe with Flamengo from which returned undefeated. In 1952 he made history by interrupting a CR Vasco da Gama unbeaten series, and started to make his way to Flamengo second state championship in 1953, 1954 and 1955. Índio was still Flamengo's top scorer in the seasons of 1953 and 1956, with 41 and 31 goals respectively.

== International career ==
For Brazil, he participated in World Cup 1954 and 1957 South American Championship. He played 10 games and 5 goals with the hopscotch. For the Brazil national team, his most important goal was against Peru, in the 1958 FIFA World Cup qualification. The game was 1–1 in Lima, and on the return Brazil won 1–0 with a "dry leaf" by Didi.

== Honours ==
Flamengo

- Rio State Championship: 1953, 1954, 1955

Brazil

- 1954 FIFA World Cup - Quarter-finals
- 1957 South American Championship - runner-up
