= Traçaia =

Brazilian footballer

Personal information
- Full name: José Roque Paes
- Date of birth: 16 August 1933
- Place of birth: Cuiabá, Brazil
- Date of death: 21 June 1971 (aged 37)
- Position: Attacking midfielder

Senior career*
Years	Team	Apps	(Gls)
1951–1952	Cuiabá		
1953	Mixto		
1954	Dom Bosco		
1955–1962	Sport Recife		
1962–1965	Admira Energie	46	(13)
1965–1966	Kapfenberger SV	9	(2)

International career
1959	Brazil	5	(1)
- * Club domestic league appearances and goals

José Roque Paes (16 August 1933 – 21 June 1971), better known as Traçaia, was a Brazilian professional footballer who played as an attacking midfielder. He made five appearances for the Brazil national team in 1959. He was also part of Brazil's squad for the 1959 South American Championship that took place in Ecuador.
