= Dida (footballer, born 1934) =

Brazilian footballer (1934–2002)

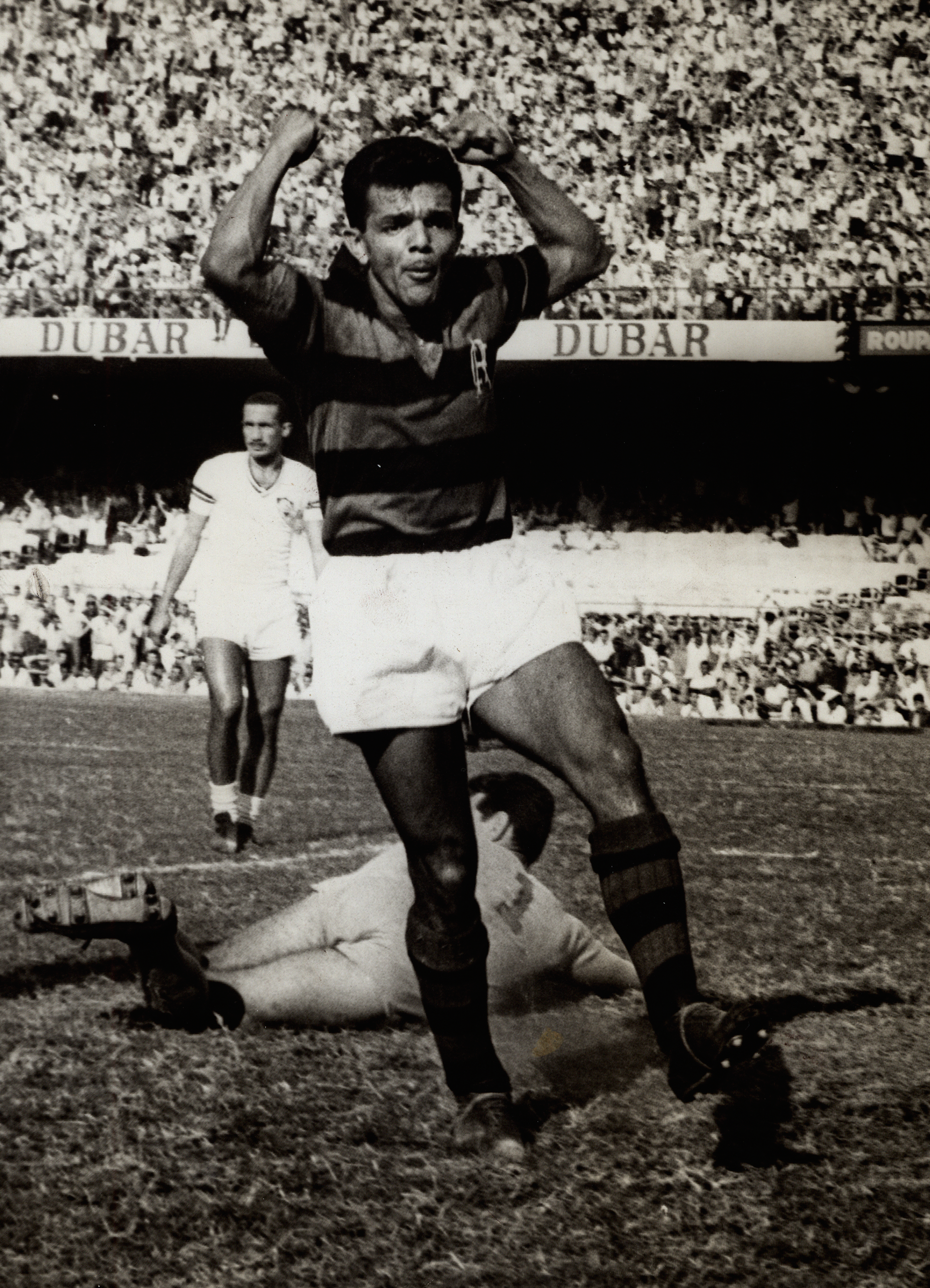
- Dida in 1961

Personal information
- Full name: Edvaldo Alves de Santa Rosa
- Date of birth: 16 March 1934
- Place of birth: Maceió, AL
- Date of death: 17 September 2002 (aged 68)
- Place of death: Rio de Janeiro
- Positions: Attacking midfielder; forward

Senior career*
Years	Team	Apps	(Gls)
1949–1950	América EC		
1950–1953	CSA		
1954–1963	Flamengo	147	(93)
1964–1966	Portuguesa de Desportos	33	(10)
1966–1968	Atlético Junior	67	(32)

International career
1958–1961	Brazil	6	(4)
Medal record
Men's Football
Representing Brazil
FIFA World Cup
Winner	1958 Sweden
- * Club domestic league appearances and goals

Edvaldo Alves de Santa Rosa (26 March 1934 – 17 September 2002), better known as Dida, was a Brazilian footballer who played as a forward or attacking midfielder. Following his retirement, he remained with Flamengo, working for two decades with the club's youth teams.

On 17 September 2002, he died of cancer in a Rio de Janeiro hospital, at the age of 68.

Dida is the 2nd high scorer in Flamengo's history with 244 goals. He was capped six times for his country at international level between 1958 and 1961, including at the victorious 1958 World Cup in Sweden, scoring four goals in total.

== Honours ==
CSA

- Alagoas State Championship: 1949, 1952

Flamengo

- Rio State Championship 1953, 1954, 1955, 1963
- Rio-São Paulo Tournament 1961

Brazil

- FIFA World Cup: 1958
