= Marco Antônio (footballer, born 1940) =

Brazilian footballer (1940–2026)

Personal information
- Full name: Marco Antônio Garcia Alves
- Date of birth: 26 December 1940
- Place of birth: Piraí, Brazil
- Date of death: July 2026 (aged 85)
- Position: Midfielder

International career
Years	Team	Apps	(Gls)
1963	Brazil	7	(2)

Marco Antônio Garcia Alves (26 December 1940 – July 2026), better known as just Marco Antônio, was a Brazilian footballer. He played in seven matches for the Brazil national football team in 1963. He was also part of Brazil's squad for the 1963 South American Championship. Marco Antonio died in July 2026, at the age of 85.
