= Lists of national football team results =

This is a lists of national football team results.

== Argentina ==
- Argentina national football team results (1902–1919)
- Argentina national football team results (1920–1939)
- Argentina national football team results (1940–1959)
- Argentina national football team results (1960–1979)
- Argentina national football team results (1980–1999)
- Argentina national football team results (2000–2019)
- Argentina national football team results (2020–present)

== Bolivia ==
- Bolivia national football team results (1926–1979)
- Bolivia national football team results (1980–1999)
- Bolivia national football team results (2000–2019)
- Bolivia national football team results (2020–present)

== Brazil ==
- Brazil national football team results (1914–1949)
- Brazil national football team results (1950–1969)
- Brazil national football team results (1970–1989)
- Brazil national football team results (1990–2009)
- Brazil national football team results (2010–present)
- Rio de Janeiro state football team results (1901–1950)
- Rio de Janeiro state football team results (1951–2010)
- São Paulo state football team results (1901–1950)
- São Paulo state football team results (1951–2010)

== Chile ==
- Chile national football team results (1910–1959)
- Chile national football team results (1960–1979)
- Chile national football team results (1980–1999)
- Chile national football team results (2000–2019)
- Chile national football team results (2020–present)

== Colombia ==
- Colombia national football team results (1938–1979)
- Colombia national football team results (1980–1999)
- Colombia national football team results (2000–2019)
- Colombia national football team results (2020–present)

== Comoros ==
- Comoros national football team results (1979–2019)
- Comoros national football team results (2020–present)

== Ecuador ==
- Ecuador national football team results (1938–1979)
- Ecuador national football team results (1980–1999)
- Ecuador national football team results (2000–2019)
- Ecuador national football team results (2020–present)

== Fiji ==
- Fiji national football team results (1951–1999)
- Fiji national football team results (2000–present)

== Guinea ==
- Guinea national football team results (1958–1999)
- Guinea national football team results (2000–2019)
- Guinea national football team results (2020–present)

== Mauritania ==
- Mauritania national football team results (1961–2019)
- Mauritania national football team results (2020–present)

== Moldova ==
- Moldova national football team results (1991–1999)
- Moldova national football team results (2000–2009)
- Moldova national football team results (2010–2019)
- Moldova national football team results (2020–present)

== Namibia ==
- Namibia national football team results (1990–2019)
- Namibia national football team results (2020–present)

== New Caledonia ==
- New Caledonia national football team results (1951–1999)
- New Caledonia national football team results (2000–present)

== New Zealand ==
- New Zealand men's national football team results (1922–1969)
- New Zealand men's national football team results (1970–1999)
- New Zealand men's national football team results (2000–2019)
- New Zealand men's national football team results (2020–present)

== Paraguay ==
- Paraguay national football team results (1919–1959)
- Paraguay national football team results (1960–1979)
- Paraguay national football team results (1980–1999)
- Paraguay national football team results (2000–2019)
- Paraguay national football team results (2020–present)

== Solomon Islands ==
- Solomon Islands national football team results (1963–1999)
- Solomon Islands national football team results (2000–2019)

== South Africa ==
- South Africa national soccer team results (1947–1955)
- South Africa national soccer team results (1992–1999)
- South Africa national soccer team results (2000–2009)
- South Africa national soccer team results (2010–2019)
- South Africa national soccer team results (2020–present)

== Tahiti ==
- Tahiti national football team results (1952–1999)
- Tahiti national football team results (2000–2019)
