= Ecuador national football team results (2000–2019) =

This page details the match results and statistics of the Ecuador national football team from 2000 to 2019.

== Key ==
Key to matches

- Att.=Match attendance
- (H)=Home ground
- (A)=Away ground
- (N)=Neutral ground

Key to record by opponent

- Pld=Games played
- W=Games won
- D=Games drawn
- L=Games lost
- GF=Goals for
- GA=Goals against

== Results ==
Ecuador's score is shown first in each case.

No.	Date	Venue	Opponents	Score	Competition	Ecuador scorers	Att.	Ref.
281	27 January 2000	Estadio Olímpico Metropolitano, San Pedro Sula (A)	Honduras	1–1	Friendly	Graziani	12,000	
282	8 March 2000	Estadio Rodrigo Paz Delgado, Quito (H)	Honduras	1–3	Friendly	E. Hurtado	1,000	
283	29 March 2000	Estadio Rodrigo Paz Delgado, Quito (H)	Venezuela	2–0	2002 FIFA World Cup qualification	Delgado, Aguinaga	50,000	
284	26 April 2000	Estádio do Morumbi, São Paulo (A)	Brazil	2–3	2002 FIFA World Cup qualification	Aguinaga, De la Cruz	64,738	
285	3 June 2000	Estadio Defensores del Chaco, Asunción (A)	Paraguay	1–3	2002 FIFA World Cup qualification	Graziani	27,000	
286	25 June 2000	Estadio Olímpico Atahualpa, Quito (H)	Panama	5–0	Friendly	Kaviedes (3), Delgado (2)	2,000	
287	29 June 2000	Estadio Olímpico Atahualpa, Quito (H)	Peru	2–1	2002 FIFA World Cup qualification	Chalá, E. Hurtado	45,000	
288	19 July 2000	Estadio Monumental, Buenos Aires (A)	Argentina	0–2	2002 FIFA World Cup qualification		44,199	
289	25 July 2000	Estadio Olímpico Atahualpa, Quito (H)	Colombia	0–0	2002 FIFA World Cup qualification		43,000	
290	11 August 2000	Estadio Rommel Fernández, Panama City (A)	Panama	0–0	Friendly		7,500	
291	16 August 2000	Estadio Rodrigo Paz Delgado, Quito (H)	Bolivia	2–0	2002 FIFA World Cup qualification	Delgado (2)	21,526	
292	3 September 2000	Estadio Centenario, Montevideo (A)	Uruguay	0–4	2002 FIFA World Cup qualification		60,000	
293	20 September 2000	San Diego Stadium, San Diego (N)	Mexico	0–2	Friendly		20,500	
294	8 October 2000	Estadio Olímpico Atahualpa, Quito (H)	Chile	1–0	2002 FIFA World Cup qualification	Delgado	28,566	
295	15 November 2000	Estadio José Pachencho Romero, Maracaibo (A)	Venezuela	2–1	2002 FIFA World Cup qualification	Kaviedes, Sánchez	11,000	
296	28 March 2001	Estadio Olímpico Atahualpa, Quito (H)	Brazil	1–0	2002 FIFA World Cup qualification	Delgado	40,800	
297	24 April 2001	Estadio Olímpico Atahualpa, Quito (H)	Paraguay	2–1	2002 FIFA World Cup qualification	Delgado (2)	30,145	
298	2 June 2001	Estadio Monumental, Lima (A)	Peru	2–1	2002 FIFA World Cup qualification	Méndez, Delgado	60,000	
299	7 June 2001	Columbus Crew Stadium, Columbus (N)	United States	0–0	Friendly		12,572	
300	2 July 2001	Giants Stadium, East Rutherford (N)	El Salvador	1–0	Friendly	Chalá	—	
301	7 July 2001	Miami Orange Bowl, Miami (N)	Honduras	1–1	Friendly	Espinoza	10,000	
302	11 July 2001	Estadio Metropolitano, Barranquilla (N)	Chile	1–4	2001 Copa América	Chalá	40,000	
303	14 July 2001	Estadio Metropolitano, Barranquilla (N)	Colombia	0–1	2001 Copa América		40,000	
304	17 July 2001	Estadio Metropolitano, Barranquilla (N)	Venezuela	4–0	2001 Copa América	Delgado (2), Fernández, Méndez	20,000	
305	15 August 2001	Estadio Olímpico Atahualpa, Quito (H)	Argentina	0–2	2002 FIFA World Cup qualification		45,000	
306	5 September 2001	Estadio El Campín, Bogotá (A)	Colombia	0–0	2002 FIFA World Cup qualification		28,487	
307	6 October 2001	Estadio Hernando Siles, La Paz (A)	Bolivia	5–1	2002 FIFA World Cup qualification	De la Cruz, Delgado, Kaviedes, Fernández, Gómez	8,000	
308	7 November 2001	Estadio Olímpico Atahualpa, Quito (H)	Uruguay	1–1	2002 FIFA World Cup qualification	Kaviedes	40,000	
309	14 November 2001	Estadio Nacional, Santiago (A)	Chile	0–0	2002 FIFA World Cup qualification		19,237	
310	12 January 2002	Estadio Modelo, Guayaquil (H)	Guatemala	1–0	Friendly	I. Hurtado	45,000	
311	20 January 2002	Miami Orange Bowl, Miami (N)	Haiti	0–2	2002 CONCACAF Gold Cup		12,253	
312	22 January 2002	Miami Orange Bowl, Miami (N)	Canada	2–0	2002 CONCACAF Gold Cup	Aguinaga (2)	3,827	
313	12 February 2002	Rat Verlegh Stadion, Breda (N)	Turkey	1–0	Friendly	C. Tenorio	5,000	
314	10 March 2002	Legion Field, Birmingham (A)	United States	0–1	Friendly		24,133	
315	27 March 2002	Giants Stadium, East Rutherford (N)	Bulgaria	3–0	Friendly	Kaviedes (2), C. Tenorio	50,000	
316	18 April 2002	Estadio de La Condomina, Murcia (N)	South Africa	0–0	Friendly		6,000	
317	8 May 2002	Giants Stadium, East Rutherford (N)	FR Yugoslavia	1–0	Friendly	Delgado	36,540	
318	23 May 2002	Tottori Stadium, Tottori (N)	Senegal	0–1	Friendly		—	
319	3 June 2002	Sapporo Dome, Sapporo (N)	Italy	0–2	2002 FIFA World Cup		31,081	
320	9 June 2002	Miyagi Stadium, Rifu (N)	Mexico	1–2	2002 FIFA World Cup	Delgado	45,610	
321	13 June 2002	International Stadium, Yokohama (N)	Croatia	1–0	2002 FIFA World Cup	Méndez	65,862	
322	16 October 2002	Estadio Ricardo Saprissa Aymá, San José (A)	Costa Rica	1–1	Friendly	C. Tenorio	8,000	
323	20 October 2002	Olympic Stadium, Caracas (A)	Venezuela	0–2	Friendly		28,000	
324	20 November 2002	Estadio Olímpico Atahualpa, Quito (H)	Costa Rica	2–2	Friendly	Aguinaga, Kaviedes	35,000	
325	9 February 2003	Estadio Modelo, Guayaquil (H)	Estonia	1–0	Friendly	I. Hurtado	12,000	
326	12 February 2003	Estadio Olímpico Atahualpa, Quito (H)	Estonia	2–1	Friendly	Baldeón (2)	3,000	
327	30 April 2003	Metropolitano Stadium, Madrid (A)	Spain	0–4	Friendly		39,900	
328	8 June 2003	Metropolitano Stadium, Madrid (N)	Colombia	0–0	Friendly		12,000	
329	11 June 2003	Giants Stadium, East Rutherford (N)	Peru	2–2	Friendly	Kaviedes, C. Tenorio	—	
330	21 August 2003	Estadio Bellavista, Ambato (H)	Guatemala	2–0	Friendly	Baldeón, Aguinaga	25,000	
331	6 September 2003	Estadio Olímpico Atahualpa, Quito (H)	Venezuela	2–0	2006 FIFA World Cup qualification	Espinoza, C. Tenorio	14,997	
332	10 September 2003	Vivaldão, Manaus (A)	Brazil	0–1	2006 FIFA World Cup qualification		36,601	
333	15 November 2003	Estadio Defensores del Chaco, Asunción (A)	Paraguay	1–2	2006 FIFA World Cup qualification	Méndez	12,000	
334	19 November 2003	Estadio Olímpico Atahualpa, Quito (H)	Peru	0–0	2006 FIFA World Cup qualification		36,341	
335	10 March 2004	Estadio Víctor Manuel Reyna, Tuxtla Gutierrez (A)	Mexico	1–2	Friendly	Méndez	20,000	
336	30 March 2004	Estadio Monumental, Buenos Aires (A)	Argentina	0–1	2006 FIFA World Cup qualification		55,000	
337	28 April 2004	Lockhart Stadium, Fort Lauderdale (N)	Honduras	1–1	Friendly	Ordóñez	15,000	
338	2 June 2004	Estadio Olímpico Atahualpa, Quito (H)	Colombia	2–1	2006 FIFA World Cup qualification	Delgado, Salas	31,484	
339	5 June 2004	Estadio Olímpico Atahualpa, Quito (H)	Bolivia	3–2	2006 FIFA World Cup qualification	Solíz (o.g.), Delgado, De la Cruz	30,020	
340	7 July 2004	Estadio Elías Aguirre, Chiclayo (N)	Argentina	1–6	2004 Copa América	Delgado	24,000	
341	10 July 2004	Estadio Elías Aguirre, Chiclayo (N)	Uruguay	1–2	2004 Copa América	Salas	25,000	
342	13 July 2004	Estadio Miguel Grau, Piura (N)	Mexico	1–2	2004 Copa América	Delgado	21,000	
343	5 September 2004	Estadio Centenario, Montevideo (A)	Uruguay	0–1	2006 FIFA World Cup qualification		28,000	
344	10 October 2004	Estadio Olímpico Atahualpa, Quito (H)	Chile	2–0	2006 FIFA World Cup qualification	Kaviedes, Méndez	27,956	
345	14 October 2004	Estadio Polideportivo de Pueblo Nuevo, San Cristóbal (A)	Venezuela	1–3	2006 FIFA World Cup qualification	M. Ayoví	20,000	
346	20 October 2004	June 11 Stadium, Tripoli (N)	Jordan	0–3	LG Cup		—	
347	22 October 2004	June 11 Stadium, Tripoli (N)	Nigeria	2–2 (4–3p)	LG Cup	M. Ayoví, Porozo	—	
348	27 October 2004	Giants Stadium, East Rutherford (N)	Mexico	1–2	Friendly	Calle	—	
349	17 November 2004	Estadio Olímpico Atahualpa, Quito (H)	Brazil	1–0	2006 FIFA World Cup qualification	Méndez	38,308	
350	26 January 2005	Estadio Bellavista, Ambato (H)	Panama	2–0	Friendly	O. Tenorio (2)	5,000	
351	29 January 2005	Estadio Rafael Vera Yépez, Babahoyo (H)	Panama	2–0	Friendly	O. Tenorio (2)	—	
352	9 February 2005	Estadio Sausalito, Viña del Mar (A)	Chile	0–3	Friendly		15,000	
353	16 February 2005	Estadio Eladio Rosabal Cordero, Heredia (A)	Costa Rica	2–1	Friendly	Avoyí, Guagua	1,000	
354	27 March 2005	Estadio Olímpico Atahualpa, Quito (H)	Paraguay	5–2	2006 FIFA World Cup qualification	A. Valencia (2), Méndez (2), M. Ayoví	32,449	
355	30 March 2005	Estadio Nacional, Lima (A)	Peru	2–2	2006 FIFA World Cup qualification	A. Valencia, De la Cruz	40,000	
356	4 May 2005	Giants Stadium, East Rutherford (N)	Paraguay	1–0	Friendly	Méndez	26,491	
357	4 June 2005	Estadio Olímpico Atahualpa, Quito (H)	Argentina	2–0	2006 FIFA World Cup qualification	Lara, Delgado	37,583	
358	8 June 2005	Estadio Metropolitano, Barranquilla (A)	Colombia	0–3	2006 FIFA World Cup qualification		20,402	
359	11 June 2005	Giants Stadium, East Rutherford (N)	Italy	1–1	Friendly	M. Ayoví	27,583	
360	17 August 2005	Estadio Federativo Reina del Cisne, Loja (H)	Venezuela	3–1	Friendly	Borja, Lara (2)	10,000	
361	3 September 2005	Estadio Hernando Siles, La Paz (A)	Bolivia	2–1	2006 FIFA World Cup qualification	Delgado (2)	8,434	
362	8 October 2005	Estadio Olímpico Atahualpa, Quito (H)	Uruguay	0–0	2006 FIFA World Cup qualification		37,270	
363	12 October 2005	Estadio Nacional, Santiago (A)	Chile	0–0	2006 FIFA World Cup qualification		49,530	
364	13 November 2005	Mini Estadi, Barcelona (N)	Poland	0–3	Friendly		6,000	
365	27 December 2005	Cairo International Stadium, Cairo (N)	Senegal	1–2	LG Cup	Borja	—	
366	29 December 2005	Cairo International Stadium, Cairo (N)	Uganda	1–2	LG Cup	Kaviedes	—	
367	25 January 2006	Estadio Modelo, Guayaquil (H)	Honduras	1–0	Friendly	D. Caicedo	10,000	
368	1 March 2006	Amsterdam Arena, Amsterdam (A)	Netherlands	0–1	Friendly		35,000	
369	30 March 2006	Oita Stadium, Ōita (A)	Japan	0–1	Friendly		36,507	
370	24 May 2006	Giants Stadium, East Rutherford (N)	Colombia	1–1	Friendly	S. Castillo	52,425	
371	28 May 2006	Campo de Fútbol de Vallecas, Madrid (N)	Macedonia	1–2	Friendly	C. Tenorio	4,000	
372	9 June 2006	Arena AufSchalke, Gelsenkirchen (N)	Poland	2–0	2006 FIFA World Cup	C. Tenorio, Delgado	48,426	
373	15 June 2006	Volksparkstadion, Hamburg (N)	Costa Rica	3–0	2006 FIFA World Cup	C. Tenorio, Delgado, Kaviedes	50,000	
374	20 June 2006	Olympiastadion, Berlin (N)	Germany	0–3	2006 FIFA World Cup		72,000	
375	25 June 2006	Gottlieb-Daimler-Stadion, Stuttgart (N)	England	0–1	2006 FIFA World Cup		52,000	
376	6 September 2006	Giants Stadium, East Rutherford (N)	Peru	1–1	Friendly	Benítez	20,000	
377	10 October 2006	Råsunda Stadium, Solna (N)	Brazil	1–2	Friendly	Borja	37,000	
378	18 January 2007	Estadio Alejandro Serrano Aguilar, Cuenca (H)	Sweden	2–1	Friendly	Vaca, C. Tenorio	—	
379	21 January 2007	Estadio Olímpico Atahualpa, Quito (H)	Sweden	1–1	Friendly	Zura	—	
380	25 March 2007	Raymond James Stadium, Tampa (A)	United States	1–3	Friendly	F. Caicedo	31,547	
381	28 March 2007	Oakland Coliseum, Oakland (N)	Mexico	2–4	Friendly	C. Tenorio, Espinoza	47,416	
382	23 May 2007	Giants Stadium, East Rutherford (N)	Republic of Ireland	1–1	Friendly	Benítez	20,823	
383	3 June 2007	Vicente Calderón Stadium, Madrid (N)	Peru	1–2	Friendly	C. Tenorio, De la Cruz	—	
384	6 June 2007	Mini Estadi, Barcelona (N)	Peru	2–0	Friendly	De la Cruz, Benítez	—	
385	24 June 2007	Estadio Metropolitano, Barranquilla (A)	Colombia	1–3	Friendly	W. Ayoví	35,000	
386	27 June 2007	Polideportivo Cachamay, Ciudad Guayana (N)	Chile	2–3	2007 Copa América	A. Valencia, Benítez	35,000	
387	1 July 2007	Estadio Monumental, Maturín (N)	Mexico	1–2	2007 Copa América	Méndez	42,000	
388	4 July 2007	Estadio José Antonio Anzoátegui, Barcelona (N)	Brazil	0–1	2007 Copa América		34,000	
389	22 August 2007	Estadio Olímpico Atahualpa, Quito (H)	Bolivia	1–0	Friendly	Urrutia	20,000	
390	8 September 2007	Estadio Olímpico Atahualpa, Quito (H)	El Salvador	5–1	Friendly	Lara, Benítez (2), F. Caicedo, Urrutia	—	
391	12 September 2007	Estadio Olímpico Metropolitano, San Pedro Sula (A)	Honduras	1–2	Friendly	Guagua	25,000	
392	13 October 2007	Estadio Olímpico Atahualpa, Quito (H)	Venezuela	0–1	2010 FIFA World Cup qualification		29,644	
393	17 October 2007	Maracanã Stadium, Rio de Janeiro (A)	Brazil	0–5	2010 FIFA World Cup qualification		87,000	
394	17 November 2007	Estadio Defensores del Chaco, Asunción (A)	Paraguay	1–5	2010 FIFA World Cup qualification	Kaviedes	25,433	
395	21 November 2007	Estadio Olímpico Atahualpa, Quito (H)	Peru	5–1	2010 FIFA World Cup qualification	W. Ayoví (2), Kaviedes, Méndez (2)	28,557	
396	26 March 2008	Estadio La Cocha, Latacunga (H)	Haiti	3–1	Friendly	S. Castillo, W. Ayoví, C. Tenorio	—	
397	27 May 2008	Stade des Alpes, Grenoble (A)	France	0–2	Friendly		30,000	
398	15 June 2008	Estadio Monumental, Buenos Aires (A)	Argentina	1–1	2010 FIFA World Cup qualification	Urrutia	41,167	
399	18 June 2008	Estadio Olímpico Atahualpa, Quito (A)	Colombia	0–0	2010 FIFA World Cup qualification		33,588	
400	20 August 2008	Giants Stadium, East Rutherford (N)	Colombia	1–0	Friendly	Benítez	32,439	
401	6 September 2008	Estadio Olímpico Atahualpa, Quito (H)	Bolivia	3–1	2010 FIFA World Cup qualification	F. Caicedo, Méndez, Benítez	35,000	
402	10 September 2008	Estadio Centenario, Montevideo (A)	Uruguay	0–0	2010 FIFA World Cup qualification		58,000	
403	12 October 2008	Estadio Olímpico Atahualpa, Quito (H)	Chile	1–0	2010 FIFA World Cup qualification	Benítez	33,079	
404	15 October 2008	Estadio José Antonio Anzoátegui, Barcelona (N)	Venezuela	1–3	2010 FIFA World Cup qualification	I. Mina	10,581	
405	12 November 2008	Chase Field, Phoenix (N)	Mexico	1–2	Friendly	I. Mina	—	
406	17 December 2008	Sultan Qaboos Sports Complex, Muscat (N)	Iran	1–0	Oman International Tournament	Martínez	—	
407	19 December 2008	Sultan Qaboos Sports Complex, Muscat (N)	Oman	0–2	Oman International Tournament		—	
408	29 March 2009	Estadio Olímpico Atahualpa, Quito (H)	Brazil	1–1	2010 FIFA World Cup qualification	Noboa	40,000	
409	1 April 2009	Estadio Olímpico Atahualpa, Quito (H)	Paraguay	1–1	2010 FIFA World Cup qualification	Noboa	36,853	
410	27 May 2009	Los Angeles Memorial Coliseum, Los Angeles (N)	El Salvador	1–3	Friendly	Montero	—	
411	7 June 2009	Estadio Monumental, Lima (A)	Peru	2–1	2010 FIFA World Cup qualification	Montero, C. Tenorio	17,050	
412	10 June 2009	Estadio Olímpico Atahualpa, Quito (H)	Argentina	2–0	2010 FIFA World Cup qualification	W. Ayoví, Palacios	36,359	
413	12 August 2009	Giants Stadium, East Rutherford (N)	Jamaica	0–0	Friendly		—	
414	5 September 2009	Estadio Atanasio Girardot, Medellín (A)	Colombia	0–2	2010 FIFA World Cup qualification		42,000	
415	9 September 2009	Estadio Hernando Siles, La Paz (A)	Bolivia	3–1	2010 FIFA World Cup qualification	Méndez, A. Valencia, Benítez	10,200	
416	10 October 2009	Estadio Olímpico Atahualpa, Quito (H)	Uruguay	1–2	2010 FIFA World Cup qualification	A. Valencia	42,700	
417	14 October 2009	Estadio Monumental, Santiago (A)	Chile	0–1	2010 FIFA World Cup qualification		47,000	
418	7 May 2010	Meadowlands Stadium, East Rutherford (N)	Mexico	0–0	Friendly		77,507	
419	16 May 2010	Seoul World Cup Stadium, Seoul (A)	South Korea	0–2	Friendly		62,209	
420	4 September 2010	Estadio Akron, Zapopan (A)	Mexico	2–1	Friendly	Benítez, J. Ayoví	—	
421	7 September 2010	Estadio Metropolitano, Barquisimeto (A)	Venezuela	0–1	Friendly		—	
422	8 October 2010	Red Bull Arena, Harrison (N)	Colombia	0–1	Friendly		25,000	
423	12 October 2010	Saputo Stadium, Montreal (N)	Poland	2–2	Friendly	Benítez (2)	1,000	
424	17 November 2010	Estadio Olímpico Atahualpa, Quito (H)	Venezuela	4–1	Friendly	Benítez (2), W. Ayoví (2)	—	
425	9 February 2011	Estadio Ceibeño, La Ceiba (A)	Honduras	1–1	Friendly	Palacios	—	
426	26 March 2011	Vicente Calderón Stadium, Madrid (N)	Colombia	0–2	Friendly		—	
427	29 March 2011	ADO Den Haag Stadium, The Hague (N)	Peru	0–0	Friendly		—	
428	20 April 2011	Estadio José María Minella, Mar del Plata (A)	Argentina	2–2	Friendly	Quiñónez, S. Castillo	—	
429	28 May 2011	CenturyLink Field, Seattle (N)	Mexico	1–1	Friendly	Arroyo	—	
430	1 June 2011	BMO Field, Toronto (A)	Canada	2–2	Friendly	Benítez, Arroyo	—	
431	7 June 2011	Citi Field, New York City (N)	Greece	1–1	Friendly	Erazo	39,656	
432	3 July 2011	Estadio Brigadier General Estanislao López, Santa Fe (N)	Paraguay	0–0	2011 Copa América		20,000	
433	9 July 2011	Estadio Padre Ernesto Martearena, Salta (N)	Venezuela	0–1	2011 Copa América		12,000	
434	13 July 2011	Estadio Mario Alberto Kempes, Córdoba (N)	Brazil	2–4	2011 Copa América	F. Caicedo (2)	39,000	
435	10 August 2011	Estadio Ricardo Saprissa Aymá, San José (A)	Costa Rica	2–0	Friendly	Suárez, Méndez	—	
436	2 September 2011	Estadio Olímpico Atahualpa, Quito (H)	Jamaica	5–2	Friendly	J. Ayoví, Suárez, Benítez (2), S. Castillo	—	
437	6 September 2011	Estadio Olímpico Atahualpa, Quito (H)	Costa Rica	4–0	Friendly	Suárez, J. Ayoví, S. Castillo, Benítez	—	
438	7 October 2011	Estadio Olímpico Atahualpa, Quito (H)	Venezuela	2–0	2014 FIFA World Cup qualification	J. Ayoví, Benítez	32,278	
439	11 October 2011	Red Bull Arena, Harrison (A)	United States	1–0	Friendly	J. Ayoví	20,707	
440	11 November 2011	Estadio Defensores del Chaco, Asunción (A)	Paraguay	1–2	2014 FIFA World Cup qualification	Rojas	11,173	
441	15 November 2011	Estadio Olímpico Atahualpa, Quito (H)	Peru	2–0	2014 FIFA World Cup qualification	Méndez, Benítez	34,481	
442	29 February 2012	Estadio George Capwell, Guayaquil (H)	Honduras	2–0	Friendly	J. Ayoví (2)	—	
443	2 June 2012	Estadio Monumental, Buenos Aires (A)	Argentina	0–4	2014 FIFA World Cup qualification		50,000	
444	10 June 2012	Estadio Olímpico Atahualpa, Quito (H)	Colombia	1–0	2014 FIFA World Cup qualification	Benítez	37,353	
445	15 August 2012	Citi Field, New York City (N)	Chile	3–0	Friendly	N. Mina	—	
446	7 September 2012	Estadio Olímpico Atahualpa, Quito (H)	Bolivia	1–0	2014 FIFA World Cup qualification	F. Caicedo	32,213	
447	11 September 2012	Estadio Centenario, Montevideo (A)	Uruguay	1–1	2014 FIFA World Cup qualification	F. Caicedo	38,000	
448	12 October 2012	Estadio Olímpico Atahualpa, Quito (H)	Chile	3–1	2014 FIFA World Cup qualification	F. Caicedo (2), S. Castillo	32,600	
449	16 October 2012	Estadio José Antonio Anzoátegui, Barcelona (A)	Venezuela	1–1	2014 FIFA World Cup qualification	S. Castillo	35,076	
450	6 February 2013	Estádio D. Afonso Henriques, Guimarães (A)	Portugal	3–2	Friendly	A. Valencia, Pereira (o.g.), F. Caicedo	20,288	
451	21 March 2013	Estadio Olímpico Atahualpa, Quito (H)	El Salvador	5–0	Friendly	F. Caicedo (2), Benítez, Montero, Rojas	—	
452	26 March 2013	Estadio Olímpico Atahualpa, Quito (H)	Paraguay	4–1	2014 FIFA World Cup qualification	F. Caicedo, Montero (2), Benítez	33,048	
453	29 May 2013	FAU Stadium, Boca Raton (N)	Germany	2–4	Friendly	A. Valencia, W. Ayoví	5,000	
454	7 June 2013	Estadio Nacional, Lima (A)	Peru	0–1	2014 FIFA World Cup qualification		37,000	
455	11 June 2013	Estadio Olímpico Atahualpa, Quito (H)	Argentina	1–1	2014 FIFA World Cup qualification	S. Castillo	35,000	
456	14 August 2013	Estadio Monumental, Guayaquil (H)	Spain	0–2	Friendly		45,000	
457	6 September 2013	Estadio Metropolitano, Barranquilla (A)	Colombia	0–1	2014 FIFA World Cup qualification		46,000	
458	10 September 2013	Estadio Hernando Siles, La Paz (A)	Bolivia	1–1	2014 FIFA World Cup qualification	F. Caicedo	12,043	
459	11 October 2013	Estadio Olímpico Atahualpa, Quito (H)	Uruguay	1–0	2014 FIFA World Cup qualification	Montero	32,996	
460	15 October 2013	Estadio Nacional, Santiago (A)	Chile	1–2	2014 FIFA World Cup qualification	F. Caicedo	47,458	
461	15 November 2013	MetLife Stadium, East Rutherford (N)	Argentina	0–0	Friendly		49,165	
462	19 November 2013	BBVA Stadium, Houston (N)	Honduras	2–2	Friendly	J. Ayoví, E. Valencia	—	
463	5 March 2014	The Den, London (N)	Australia	4–3	Friendly	Martínez, S. Castillo, E. Valencia, Méndez	7,133	
464	17 May 2014	Amsterdam Arena, Amsterdam (A)	Netherlands	1–1	Friendly	Montero	51,000	
465	31 May 2014	AT&T Stadium, Arlington (N)	Mexico	1–3	Friendly	E. Valencia	—	
466	4 June 2014	Sun Life Stadium, Miami Gardens (N)	England	2–2	Friendly	E. Valencia, Arroyo	18,327	
467	15 June 2014	Estádio Nacional Mané Garrincha, Brasília (N)	Switzerland	1–2	2014 FIFA World Cup	E. Valencia	68,351	
468	20 June 2014	Arena da Baixada, Curitiba (N)	Honduras	2–1	2014 FIFA World Cup	E. Valencia (2)	39,224	
469	25 June 2014	Maracanã Stadium, Rio de Janeiro (N)	France	0–0	2014 FIFA World Cup		73,749	
470	6 September 2014	Lockhart Stadium, Fort Lauderdale (N)	Bolivia	4–0	Friendly	Noboa, Cazares, E. Valencia, Sornoza	10,000	
471	9 September 2014	MetLife Stadium, East Rutherford (N)	Brazil	0–1	Friendly		35,975	
472	10 October 2014	Rentschler Field, East Hartford (A)	United States	1–1	Friendly	E. Valencia	36,265	
473	14 October 2014	Red Bull Arena, Harrison (N)	El Salvador	5–1	Friendly	Plata (2), E. Valencia (2), Penilla	—	
474	28 March 2015	Los Angeles Memorial Coliseum, Los Angeles (N)	Mexico	0–1	Friendly		88,409	
475	31 March 2015	MetLife Stadium, East Rutherford (N)	Argentina	1–2	Friendly	Bolaños	48,000	
476	3 June 2015	Estadio Rommel Fernández, Panama City (A)	Panama	1–1	Friendly	Martínez	1,000	
477	6 June 2015	Estadio Reales Tamarindos, Portoviejo (H)	Panama	4–0	Friendly	Bolaños, Martínez (2), Montero	—	
478	11 June 2015	Estadio Nacional, Santiago (N)	Chile	0–2	2015 Copa América		46,000	
479	15 June 2015	Estadio Elías Figueroa Brander, Valparaíso (N)	Bolivia	2–3	2015 Copa América	E. Valencia, Bolaños	16,342	
480	19 June 2015	Estadio El Teniente, Rancagua (N)	Mexico	2–1	2015 Copa América	Bolaños, E. Valencia	11,042	
481	8 September 2015	Estadio Olímpico Atahualpa, Quito (H)	Honduras	2–0	Friendly	Velásquez (o.g.), Bolaños	10,000	
482	8 October 2015	Estadio Monumental, Buenos Aires (A)	Argentina	2–0	2018 FIFA World Cup qualification	Erazo, F. Caicedo	40,000	
483	13 October 2015	Estadio Olímpico Atahualpa, Quito (H)	Bolivia	2–0	2018 FIFA World Cup qualification	Bolaños, F. Caicedo	27,333	
484	12 November 2015	Estadio Olímpico Atahualpa, Quito (H)	Uruguay	2–1	2018 FIFA World Cup qualification	F. Caicedo, Martínez	32,650	
485	17 November 2015	Polideportivo Cachamay, Ciudad Guayana (A)	Venezuela	3–1	2018 FIFA World Cup qualification	Martínez, Montero, F. Caicedo	31,659	
486	24 March 2016	Estadio Olímpico Atahualpa, Quito (H)	Paraguay	2–2	2018 FIFA World Cup qualification	E. Valencia, Mena	34,817	
487	29 March 2016	Estadio Metropolitano, Barranquilla (A)	Colombia	1–3	2018 FIFA World Cup qualification	Arroyo	38,400	
488	25 May 2016	Toyota Stadium, Frisco (A)	United States	0–1	Friendly		9,893	
489	4 June 2016	Rose Bowl, Pasadena (N)	Brazil	0–0	Copa América Centenario		53,158	
490	8 June 2016	State Farm Stadium, Glendale (N)	Peru	2–2	Copa América Centenario	E. Valencia, Bolaños	11,937	
491	12 June 2016	MetLife Stadium, East Rutherford (N)	Haiti	4–0	Copa América Centenario	E. Valencia, J. Ayoví, Noboa, A. Valencia	50,976	
492	16 June 2016	CenturyLink Field, Seattle (N)	United States	1–2	Copa América Centenario	Arroyo	47,322	
493	1 September 2016	Estadio Olímpico Atahualpa, Quito (H)	Brazil	0–3	2018 FIFA World Cup qualification		37,887	
494	6 September 2016	Estadio Nacional, Lima (A)	Peru	1–2	2018 FIFA World Cup qualification	Achilier	34,519	
495	6 October 2016	Estadio Olímpico Atahualpa, Quito (H)	Chile	3–0	2018 FIFA World Cup qualification	A. Valencia, Ramírez, F. Caicedo	30,000	
496	11 October 2016	Estadio Hernando Siles, La Paz (A)	Bolivia	2–2	2018 FIFA World Cup qualification	E. Valencia (2)	18,033	
497	10 November 2016	Estadio Centenario, Montevideo (A)	Uruguay	1–2	2018 FIFA World Cup qualification	F. Caicedo	54,868	
498	14 November 2016	Estadio Olímpico Atahualpa, Quito (H)	Venezuela	3–0	2018 FIFA World Cup qualification	Mina, Bolaños, E. Valencia	28,000	
499	23 March 2017	Estadio Defensores del Chaco, Asunción (A)	Paraguay	1–2	2018 FIFA World Cup qualification	F. Caicedo	16,287	
500	28 March 2017	Estadio Olímpico Atahualpa, Quito (H)	Colombia	0–2	2018 FIFA World Cup qualification		35,538	
501	8 June 2017	FAU Stadium, Boca Raton (N)	Venezuela	1–1	Friendly	Villanueva (o.g.)	5,832	
502	13 June 2017	Red Bull Arena, Harrison (N)	El Salvador	3–0	Friendly	Cifuente, E. Valencia, Gaibor	—	
503	26 July 2017	Estadio George Capwell, Guayaquil (H)	Trinidad and Tobago	3–1	Friendly	Anangonó, Gaibor, Murillo	15,000	
504	31 August 2017	Arena do Grêmio, Porto Alegre (A)	Brazil	0–2	2018 FIFA World Cup qualification		38,000	
505	5 September 2017	Estadio Olímpico Atahualpa, Quito (H)	Peru	1–2	2018 FIFA World Cup qualification	E. Valencia	35,000	
506	5 October 2017	Estadio Monumental, Santiago (A)	Chile	1–2	2018 FIFA World Cup qualification	Ro. Ibarra	45,000	
507	10 October 2017	Estadio Olímpico Atahualpa, Quito (H)	Argentina	1–3	2018 FIFA World Cup qualification	Ro. Ibarra	29,000	
508	7 September 2018	Red Bull Arena, Harrison (N)	Jamaica	2–0	Friendly	E. Valencia, Re Ibarra	7,200	
509	11 September 2018	SeatGeek Stadium, Bridgeview (N)	Guatemala	2–0	Friendly	E. Valencia, Ro. Ibarra	—	
510	12 October 2018	Jassim bin Hamad Stadium, Doha (A)	Qatar	3–4	Friendly	E. Valencia (2), Cevallos	11,480	
511	16 October 2018	Abdullah bin Khalifa Stadium, Doha (N)	Oman	0–0	Friendly		—	
512	15 November 2018	Estadio Nacional, Lima (A)	Peru	2–0	Friendly	A. Valencia, E. Valencia	45,000	
513	20 November 2015	Estadio Rommel Fernández, Panama City (A)	Panama	2–1	Friendly	Cifuente, E. Valencia	12,000	
514	21 March 2019	Exploria Stadium, Orlando (A)	United States	0–1	Friendly		17,422	
515	26 March 2019	Red Bull Arena, Harrison (N)	Honduras	0–0	Friendly		—	
516	1 June 2019	Hard Rock Stadium, Miami Gardens (N)	Venezuela	1–1	Friendly	E. Valencia	12,021	
517	9 June 2019	AT&T Stadium, Arlington (N)	Mexico	2–3	Friendly	Mena, Preciado	—	
518	16 June 2019	Mineirão, Belo Horizonte (N)	Uruguay	0–4	2019 Copa América		13,611	
519	21 June 2019	Arena Fonte Nova, Salvador (N)	Chile	1–2	2019 Copa América	E. Valencia	14,727	
520	24 June 2019	Mineirão, Belo Horizonte (N)	Japan	1–1	2019 Copa América	Mena	7,623	
521	5 September 2019	Red Bull Arena, Harrison (N)	Peru	1–0	Friendly	E. Castillo	21,428	
522	10 September 2019	Estadio Alejandro Serrano Aguilar, Cuenca (H)	Bolivia	3–0	Friendly	Estrada, Sornoza, Plata	—	
523	13 October 2019	Estadio Manuel Martínez Valero, Elche (N)	Argentina	1–6	Friendly	Mena	—	
524	14 November 2019	Estadio Reales Tamarindos, Portoviejo (H)	Trinidad and Tobago	3–0	Friendly	Franco, E. Valencia (2)	—	
525	19 November 2019	Red Bull Arena, Harrison (N)	Colombia	0–1	Friendly		10,000	

== Record by opponent ==
Team	Pld	W	D	L	GF	GA	GD	WPCT
Argentina	15	3	4	8	14	29	−15	20.00
Australia	1	1	0	0	4	3	+1	100.00
Bolivia	14	11	2	1	34	12	+22	78.57
Brazil	13	2	2	9	8	23	−15	15.38
Bulgaria	1	1	0	0	3	0	+3	100.00
Canada	2	1	1	0	4	2	+2	50.00
Chile	16	6	2	8	19	20	−1	37.50
Colombia	18	3	5	10	7	21	−14	16.67
Costa Rica	6	4	2	0	14	4	+10	66.67
Croatia	1	1	0	0	1	0	+1	100.00
El Salvador	6	5	0	1	20	5	+15	83.33
England	2	0	1	1	2	3	−1	0.00
Estonia	2	2	0	0	3	1	+2	100.00
FR Yugoslavia	1	1	0	0	1	0	+1	100.00
France	2	0	1	1	0	2	−2	0.00
Germany	2	0	0	2	2	7	−5	0.00
Greece	1	0	1	0	1	1	0	0.00
Guatemala	3	3	0	0	5	0	+5	100.00
Haiti	3	2	0	1	7	3	+4	66.67
Honduras	12	4	6	2	15	12	+3	33.33
Iran	1	1	0	0	1	0	+1	100.00
Italy	2	0	1	1	1	3	−2	0.00
Jamaica	3	2	1	0	7	2	+5	66.67
Japan	2	0	1	1	1	2	−1	0.00
Jordan	1	0	0	1	0	3	−3	0.00
Macedonia	1	0	0	1	1	2	−1	0.00
Mexico	15	2	2	11	16	28	−12	13.33
Netherlands	2	0	1	1	1	2	−1	0.00
Nigeria	1	0	1	0	2	2	0	0.00
Oman	2	0	1	1	0	2	−2	0.00
Panama	7	5	2	0	16	2	+14	71.43
Paraguay	12	4	3	5	20	21	−1	33.33
Peru	18	8	6	4	28	18	+10	44.44
Poland	3	1	1	1	4	5	−1	33.33
Portugal	1	1	0	0	3	3	0	100.00
Qatar	1	0	0	1	3	4	−1	0.00
Republic of Ireland	1	0	1	0	1	1	0	0.00
Senegal	2	0	0	2	1	3	−2	0.00
South Africa	1	0	1	0	0	0	0	0.00
South Korea	1	0	0	1	0	2	−2	0.00
Spain	2	0	0	2	0	6	−6	0.00
Sweden	2	1	1	0	3	2	+1	50.00
Switzerland	1	0	0	1	1	2	−1	0.00
Trinidad and Tobago	2	2	0	0	6	1	+5	100.00
Turkey	1	1	0	0	1	0	+1	100.00
Uganda	1	0	0	1	1	2	−1	0.00
United States	8	1	2	5	4	9	−5	12.50
Uruguay	12	2	4	6	8	18	−10	16.67
Venezuela	18	9	3	6	30	18	+12	50.00
Total	245	90	59	96	324	311	+13	36.73

Source: Results
