= South Africa national soccer team results (1947–1955) =

This page details the match results and statistics of the South Africa national football team from 1947 to 1955.

== Results ==
South Africa's score is shown first in each case.

No.	Date	Venue	Opponents	Score	Competition	Goalscorers	Att.	Ref.
1	10 May 1947	Sydney Cricket Ground, Sydney (A)	Australia	2–1	Friendly	Anley, Wilson	40,000	
2	24 May 1947	Brisbane Cricket Ground, Brisbane (A)	Australia	4–2	Friendly	Wilson, Smethurst, Anley (2)	15,000	
3	31 May 1947	Sydney Showground, Sydney (A)	Australia	3–3	Friendly	Classens (2), Smethurst	20,000	
4	7 June 1947	Newcastle Number 1 Sports Ground, Newcastle (A)	Australia	1–5	Friendly	Wilson	18,442	
5	14 June 1947	Sydney Cricket Ground, Sydney (A)	Australia	2–1	Friendly	Anley (2)		
6	28 June 1947	Lancaster Park, Christchurch (A)	New Zealand	6–5	Friendly	O'Linn, Smethurst, Pretorius, Falconer (2), Clack	10,500	
7	5 July 1947	Carisbrook, Dunedin (A)	New Zealand	6–0	Friendly	Wilson (3), Anley, Falconer (2)	12,000	
8	12 July 1947	Athletic Park, Wellington (A)	New Zealand	8–3	Friendly	Anley, Wilson (4), Classens (2), Falconer	8,000	
9	19 July 1947	Eden Park, Auckland (A)	New Zealand	4–1	Friendly	Falconer, Smethurst, Wilson, O'Malley (o.g.)	12,000	
10	24 June 1950	Kingsmead, Durban (H)	Australia	3–2	Friendly	Classens (2), Botha	20,000	
11	1 July 1950	Ellis Park Stadium, Johannesburg (H)	Australia	2–1	Friendly	Classens (2)	20,000	
12	8 July 1950	St George's Park, Port Elizabeth (H)	Australia	1–2	Friendly	Classens	8,000	
13	23 July 1950	Hartleyvale Stadium, Cape Town (H)	Australia	0–2	Friendly	—	12,000	
14	22 November 1953	Estádio Nacional, Lisbon (A)	Portugal	1–3	Friendly	Roos	30,000	
15	1 May 1954	Rand Stadium, Johannesburg (H)	Israel	2–1	Friendly	Warren, Roos	22,000	
16	3 September 1955	Brisbane Cricket Ground, Brisbane (A)	Australia	3–0	Friendly	Palmer, Paton, Hughes	5,600	
17	10 September 1955	Olympic Park Stadium, Melbourne (A)	Australia	2–0	Friendly	Palmer, Hughes	3,000	
18	17 September 1955	Kensington Oval, Adelaide (A)	Australia	8–0	Friendly	Rufus (2), Hughes (2), Paton (2), Jacques, Palmer	3,088	
19	24 September 1955	Sydney Cricket Ground, Sydney (A)	Australia	6–0	Friendly	Hughes (2), Paton, Palmer, Le Roux, Wilson (o.g.)	5,431	
20	1 October 1955	Newcastle Number 1 Sports Ground, Newcastle (A)	Australia	4–1	Friendly	Hughes (3), Le Roux	2,907	
