= Paraguay national football team results (2020–present) =

National football team results

This page details the match results and statistics of the Paraguay national football team from 2020 to present.

== Key ==
Key to matches

- Att.=Match attendance
- (H)=Home ground
- (A)=Away ground
- (N)=Neutral ground

Key to record by opponent

- Pld=Games played
- W=Games won
- D=Games drawn
- L=Games lost
- GF=Goals for
- GA=Goals against

== Results ==
Paraguay's score is shown first in each case.

Paraguay national football team results
No.	Date	Venue	Opponents	Score	Competition	Paraguay scorers	Att.	Ref.
723	8 October 2020	Estadio Defensores del Chaco, Asunción (H)	Peru	2–2	2022 FIFA World Cup qualification	Romero (2)	0	
724	13 October 2020	Estadio Metropolitano de Mérida, Mérida (A)	Venezuela	1–0	2022 FIFA World Cup qualification	Giménez	0	
725	12 November 2020	La Bombonera, Buenos Aires (A)	Argentina	1–1	2022 FIFA World Cup qualification	Romero	0	
726	17 November 2020	Estadio Defensores del Chaco, Asunción (H)	Bolivia	2–2	2022 FIFA World Cup qualification	Romero, Kaku	0	
727	3 June 2021	Estadio Centenario, Montevideo (A)	Uruguay	0–0	2022 FIFA World Cup qualification		0	
728	8 June 2021	Estadio Defensores del Chaco, Asunción (H)	Brazil	0–2	2022 FIFA World Cup qualification		0	
729	14 June 2021	Estádio Olímpico Pedro Ludovico, Goiânia (N)	Bolivia	3–1	2021 Copa América	Kaku, Romero (2)	0	
730	21 June 2021	Estádio Nacional Mané Garrincha, Brasília (N)	Argentina	0–1	2021 Copa América		0	
731	24 June 2021	Estádio Nacional Mané Garrincha, Brasília (N)	Chile	2–0	2021 Copa América	Samudio, Almirón	0	
732	28 June 2021	Estádio Olímpico Nilton Santos, Rio de Janeiro (N)	Uruguay	0–1	2021 Copa América		0	
733	2 July 2021	Estádio Olímpico Pedro Ludovico, Goiânia (N)	Peru	3–3 (3–4p)	2021 Copa América	G. Gómez, Alonso, Ávalos	0	
734	2 September 2021	Estadio Rodrigo Paz Delgado, Quito (A)	Ecuador	0–2	2022 FIFA World Cup qualification		12,000	
735	5 September 2021	Estadio Defensores del Chaco, Asunción (H)	Colombia	1–1	2022 FIFA World Cup qualification	Sanabria	7,000	
736	9 September 2021	Estadio Defensores del Chaco, Asunción (H)	Venezuela	2–1	2022 FIFA World Cup qualification	Martínez, Kaku	5,000	
737	7 October 2021	Estadio Defensores del Chaco, Asunción (H)	Argentina	0–0	2022 FIFA World Cup qualification		34,000	
738	10 October 2021	Estadio San Carlos de Apoquindo, Santiago (A)	Chile	0–2	2022 FIFA World Cup qualification		10,800	
739	14 October 2021	Estadio Hernando Siles, La Paz (A)	Bolivia	0–4	2022 FIFA World Cup qualification		12,000	
740	11 November 2021	Estadio Defensores del Chaco, Asunción (H)	Chile	0–1	2022 FIFA World Cup qualification		42,354	
741	16 November 2021	Estadio Metropolitano, Barranquilla (A)	Colombia	0–0	2022 FIFA World Cup qualification		44,000	
742	27 January 2022	Estadio General Pablo Rojas, Asunción (H)	Uruguay	0–1	2022 FIFA World Cup qualification		36,000	
743	1 February 2022	Mineirão, Belo Horizonte (A)	Brazil	0–4	2022 FIFA World Cup qualification		32,344	
744	24 March 2022	Estadio Antonio Aranda, Ciudad del Este (H)	Ecuador	3–1	2022 FIFA World Cup qualification	Morales, Hincapié (o.g.), Almirón	10,000	
745	29 March 2022	Estadio Nacional, Lima (A)	Peru	0–2	2022 FIFA World Cup qualification		40,000	
746	2 June 2022	Sapporo Dome, Sapporo (A)	Japan	1–4	2022 Kirin Challenge Cup	González	24,511	
747	10 June 2022	Suwon World Cup Stadium, Suwon (A)	South Korea	2–2	Friendly	Almirón (2)	44,031	
748	31 August 2022	Mercedes-Benz Stadium, Atlanta (N)	Mexico	1–0	Friendly	González	—	
749	23 September 2022	Stadion Wiener Neustadt, Wiener Neustadt (N)	United Arab Emirates	1–0	Friendly	Balbuena	—	
750	27 September 2022	Estadio Benito Villamarín, Seville (N)	Morocco	0–0	Friendly		—	
751	16 November 2022	Estadio Nacional, Lima (A)	Peru	0–1	Friendly		—	
752	19 November 2022	DRV PNK Stadium, Fort Lauderdale (N)	Colombia	0–2	Friendly		18,000	
753	28 March 2023	Estadio Monumental David Arellano, Santiago (A)	Chile	2–3	Friendly	Rojas, Ávalos	30,000	
754	18 June 2023	Estadio Defensores del Chaco, Asunción (H)	Nicaragua	2–0	Friendly	Almirón, Balbuena	—	
755	7 September 2023	Estadio Antonio Aranda, Ciudad del Este (H)	Peru	0–0	2026 FIFA World Cup qualification		16,211	
756	12 September 2023	Estadio Monumental, Maturín (A)	Venezuela	0–1	2026 FIFA World Cup qualification		34,187	
757	12 October 2023	Estadio Monumental, Buenos Aires (A)	Argentina	0–1	2026 FIFA World Cup qualification		80,000	
758	17 October 2023	Estadio Defensores del Chaco, Asunción (H)	Bolivia	1–0	2026 FIFA World Cup qualification	Sanabria	30,681	
759	16 November 2023	Estadio Monumental David Arellano, Santiago (A)	Chile	0–0	2026 FIFA World Cup qualification		30,076	
760	21 November 2023	Estadio Defensores del Chaco, Asunción (H)	Colombia	0–1	2026 FIFA World Cup qualification		25,190	
761	7 June 2024	Estadio Mounmental, Lima (A)	Peru	0–0	Friendly		—	
762	11 June 2024	Estadio Nacional, Santiago (A)	Chile	0–3	Friendly		—	
763	16 June 2024	Estadio Rommel Fernández, Panama City (A)	Panama	1–0	Friendly	Velazquez	—	
764	24 June 2024	NRG Stadium, Houston (N)	Colombia	1–2	2024 Copa América	Enciso	67,059	
765	28 June 2024	Allegiant Stadium, Paradise (N)	Brazil	1–4	2024 Copa América	Alderete	46,939	
766	2 July 2024	Q2 Stadium, Austin (N)	Costa Rica	1–2	2024 Copa América	Sosa	12,765	
767	6 September 2024	Estadio Centenario, Montevideo (A)	Uruguay	0–0	2026 FIFA World Cup qualification		47,741	
768	10 September 2024	Estadio Defensores del Chaco, Asunción (H)	Brazil	1–0	2026 FIFA World Cup qualification	D. Gómez	31,962	
769	10 October 2024	Estadio Rodrigo Paz Delgado, Quito (A)	Ecuador	0–0	2026 FIFA World Cup qualification		31,000	
770	15 October 2024	Estadio Defensores del Chaco, Asunción (H)	Venezuela	2–1	2026 FIFA World Cup qualification	Sanabria	28,531	
771	14 November 2024	Estadio Defensores del Chaco, Asuncion (H)	Argentina	2–1	2026 FIFA World Cup qualification	Sanabria, Alderete	32,200	
772	19 November 2024	Estadio Municipal de El Alto, El Alto (A)	Bolivia	2–2	2026 FIFA World Cup qualification	Almirón, Enciso	18,655	
773	20 March 2025	Estadio Defensores del Chaco, Asunción (H)	Chile	1–0	2026 FIFA World Cup qualification	Alderete	31,193	
774	25 March 2025	Estadio Metropolitano, Barranquilla (A)	Colombia	2–2	2026 FIFA World Cup qualification	Alonso, Enciso	42,262	
775	5 June 2025	Estadio Defensores del Chaco, Asunción (H)	Uruguay	2–0	2026 FIFA World Cup qualification	Galarza, Enciso	30,005	
776	10 June 2025	Arena Corinthians, São Paulo (A)	Brazil	0–1	2026 FIFA World Cup qualification		46,316	
777	4 September 2025	Estadio Defensores del Chaco, Asunción (H)	Ecuador	0–0	2026 FIFA World Cup qualification		—	
778	9 September 2025	Estadio Nacional, Lima (A)	Peru	1–0	2026 FIFA World Cup qualification	Galarza	—	
779	10 October 2025	Suita City Football Stadium, Suita (A)	Japan	2–2	2025 Kirin Challenge Cup	Almirón, D. Gómez	34,169	
780	14 October 2025	Seoul World Cup Stadium, Seoul (A)	South Korea	0–2	Friendly		2,206	
781	15 November 2025	Subaru Park, Chester (A)	United States	1–2	Friendly	Arce	17,224	
782	18 November 2025	Alamodome, San Antonio (N)	Mexico	2–1	Friendly	Sanabria, Bobadilla	—	
783	27 March 2026	Karaiskakis Stadium, Piraeus (A)	Greece	1–0	Friendly	D. Gómez	—	
784	31 March 2026	Stade Bollaert-Delelis, Lens (N)	Morocco	1–2	Friendly	Caballero	38,000	
785	5 June 2026	Estadio Defensores del Chaco, Asunción (H)	Nicaragua	4–0	Friendly	Kaku, Almirón, Galarza, Maidana	35,000	
786	12 June 2026	SoFi Stadium, Inglewood (N)	United States	1–4	2026 FIFA World Cup	Maurício	70,492	
787	19 June 2026	Levi's Stadium, Santa Clara (N)	Turkey	1–0	2026 FIFA World Cup	Galarza	68,247	
788	25 June 2026	Levi's Stadium, Santa Clara (N)	Australia	0–0	2026 FIFA World Cup		68,227	
789	29 June 2026	Gillette Stadium, Foxborough (N)	Germany	1–1 (a.e.t.) (4–3p)	2026 FIFA World Cup	Enciso	63,945	
790	4 July 2026	Lincoln Financial Field, Philadelphia (N)	France	0–1	2026 FIFA World Cup		68,324	
791	27 September 2026	Audi Field, Washington, D.C. (N)	Bolivia	2–0	Friendly	Almirón	—	
792	2 October 2026	Sports Illustrated Stadium, Harrison (N)	Colombia	1–0	Friendly	H. Benítez	—	
793	13 November 2026	National Stadium, Kallang (A)	Singapore	4–1	Mizuho Blue Challenge - The Kallang Football Series Singapore	Caballero (2), Maurício, Enciso	14,360	
794	17 November 2026	National Stadium, Kallang (A)	Japan		Mizuho Blue Challenge - The Kallang Football Series Singapore			

Notes

1. A: Match held behind closed doors due to the COVID-19 pandemic in South America.
2. B: Matches due to be held in March 2021 were postponed due to travel and quarantine restrictions caused by the COVID-19 pandemic. These matches were instead played in September and October 2021.

== Record by opponent ==
Team	Pld	W	D	L	GF	GA	GD	WPCT
Argentina	5	1	2	2	3	4	−1	20.00
Australia	1	0	1	0	0	0	0	0.00
Bolivia	7	4	2	1	8	11	−3	57.14
Brazil	5	1	0	4	2	9	−7	20.00
Chile	7	2	1	4	5	9	−4	28.57
Colombia	7	0	3	4	4	9	−5	0.00
Costa Rica	1	0	0	1	1	2	−1	0.00
Ecuador	4	1	2	1	3	3	0	25.00
France	1	0	0	1	0	1	−1	0.00
Germany	1	0	1	0	1	1	0	0.00
Greece	1	1	0	0	1	0	+1	100.00
Japan	2	0	1	1	3	6	−3	0.00
Mexico	2	2	0	0	3	1	+2	100.00
Morocco	2	0	1	1	1	2	−1	0.00
Nicaragua	2	2	0	0	6	0	+6	100.00
Panama	1	1	0	0	1	0	+1	100.00
Peru	7	1	4	2	6	7	−1	14.29
Singapore	0	0	0	0	0	0	0	—
South Korea	2	0	1	1	2	4	−2	0.00
Turkey	1	1	0	0	1	0	+1	100.00
United Arab Emirates	1	1	0	0	1	0	+1	100.00
United States	2	0	0	2	2	6	−4	0.00
Uruguay	5	1	2	2	2	2	0	20.00
Venezuela	4	3	0	1	5	3	+2	75.00
Total	71	22	21	28	61	80	−19	30.99

Source: Results
