= New Zealand men's national football team results (2020–present) =

This article lists the results for the New Zealand men's national football team from 2020 to present.

New Zealand had been scheduled to play Oman and Bahrain in March 2020 however, the matches were cancelled due to the COVID-19 pandemic. Further matches against Belgium in October 2020 and England in November 2020 were also cancelled due to player availability as a result of the coronavirus pandemic.

== Key ==
Key to matches

- Att. = Match attendance
- (H) = Home ground
- (A) = Away ground
- (N) = Neutral ground

Key to record by opponent

- Pld = Games played
- W = Games won
- D = Games drawn
- L = Games lost
- GF = Goals for
- GA = Goals against

== A-International results ==
New Zealand's score is shown first in each case.

New Zealand national football team results
No.	Date	Venue	Opponents	Score	Competition	New Zealand scorers	Att.	Ref.
390	9 October 2021	Bahrain National Stadium, Manama (N)	Curaçao	2–1	Friendly	Tuiloma, Wood	0	
391	12 October 2021	Bahrain National Stadium, Manama (A)	Bahrain	1–0	Friendly	Kirwan	0	
392	17 November 2021	Zayed Sports City Stadium, Abu Dhabi (N)	Gambia	2–0	Friendly	Wood (2)	0	
393	28 January 2022	New York University Stadium, Abu Dhabi (N)	Jordan	1–3	Friendly	Wood	0	
394	18 March 2022	Qatar SC Stadium, Doha (N)	Papua New Guinea	1–0	2022 FIFA World Cup qualification	Waine	0	
395	21 March 2022	Qatar SC Stadium, Doha (N)	Fiji	4–0	2022 FIFA World Cup qualification	Wood (2), Just, Lewis	0	
396	24 March 2022	Qatar SC Stadium, Doha (N)	New Caledonia	7–1	2022 FIFA World Cup qualification	Greive (2), Rogerson, De Jong, Tuiloma, Wood (2)	0	
397	27 March 2022	Al-Arabi Stadium, Doha (N)	Tahiti	1–0	2022 FIFA World Cup qualification	Cacace	0	
398	30 March 2022	Al-Arabi Stadium, Doha (N)	Solomon Islands	5–0	2022 FIFA World Cup qualification	Tuiloma (2), Wood, Bell, Garbett	0	
399	5 June 2022	RCDE Stadium, Barcelona (N)	Peru	0–1	Friendly		32,149	
400	9 June 2022	Education City Stadium, Al Rayyan (N)	Oman	0–0	Friendly		0	
401	14 June 2022	Ahmad bin Ali Stadium, Al Rayyan (N)	Costa Rica	0–1	2022 FIFA World Cup qualification		10,803	
402	22 September 2022	Lang Park, Brisbane (A)	Australia	0–1	Friendly		25,392	
403	25 September 2022	Eden Park, Auckland (H)	Australia	0–2	Friendly		34,985	
404	23 March 2023	Mount Smart Stadium, Auckland (H)	China	0–0	Friendly		12,049	
405	26 March 2023	Wellington Regional Stadium, Wellington (H)	China	2–1	Friendly	Garbett, Zhu (o.g.)	10,307	
406	16 June 2023	Friends Arena, Solna (A)	Sweden	1–4	Friendly	McCowatt	20,528	
—	19 June 2023	Sonnensee Stadium, Ritzing (N)	Qatar	1–0	Friendly	Stamenić	150	
407	13 October 2023	Estadio Nueva Condomina, Murcia (N)	DR Congo	1–1	Friendly	Wood	—	
408	17 October 2023	Brentford Community Stadium, London (N)	Australia	0–2	Soccer Ashes		5,761	
409	17 November 2023	Georgios Kamaras Stadium, Athens (A)	Greece	0–2	Friendly		5,625	
410	21 November 2023	Aviva Stadium, Dublin (A)	Republic of Ireland	1–1	Friendly	Garbett	26,517	
411	22 March 2024	New Administrative Capital Stadium, New Administrative Capital (A)	Egypt	0–1	2024 FIFA Series		30,200	
412	26 March 2024	Cairo International Stadium, Cairo (N)	Tunisia	0–0 (2–4p)	2024 FIFA Series		50	
413	18 June 2024	VFF Freshwater Stadium, Port Vila (N)	Solomon Islands	3–0	2024 OFC Men's Nations Cup	Waine (2), Barbarouses	3,000	
414	21 June 2024	VFF Freshwater Stadium, Port Vila (N)	Vanuatu	4–0	2024 OFC Men's Nations Cup	Mata, Kaltak (o.g.), Just, Old	7,200	
415	26 June 2024	VFF Freshwater Stadium, Port Vila (N)	Tahiti	5–0	2024 OFC Men's Nations Cup	Surman, Waine (2), Barbarouses (2)	2,000	
416	30 June 2024	VFF Freshwater Stadium, Port Vila (N)	Vanuatu	3–0	2024 OFC Men's Nations Cup	Howieson, Randall, Mata	10,000	
417	7 September 2024	Rose Bowl, Pasadena (N)	Mexico	0–3	Friendly		25,271	
418	10 September 2024	TQL Stadium, Cincinnati (A)	United States	1–1	Friendly	Waine	15,711	
419	11 October 2024	VFF Freshwater Stadium, Port Vila (N)	Tahiti	3–0	2026 FIFA World Cup qualification	Just, Wood, Waine	1,000	
420	14 October 2024	North Harbour Stadium, Auckland (H)	Malaysia	4–0	Friendly	Just, Garbett, Wood, Rogerson	8,513	
421	15 November 2024	Waikato Stadium, Hamilton (H)	Vanuatu	8–1	2026 FIFA World Cup qualification	Garbett, Wood (2), Bindon, Kaltak (o.g.), Just, Singh, McCowatt	10,113	
422	18 November 2024	Mount Smart Stadium, Auckland (H)	Samoa	8–0	2026 FIFA World Cup qualification	McCowatt, Wood (3), Stamenić, de Vries, Just, Waine	5,327	
423	21 March 2025	Wellington Regional Stadium, Wellington (H)	Fiji	7–0	2026 FIFA World Cup qualification	Wood (3), Singh, Bindon, Payne, Barbarouses	20,947	
424	24 March 2025	Eden Park, Auckland (H)	New Caledonia	3–0	2026 FIFA World Cup qualification	Boxall, Barbarouses, Just	25,132	
425	7 June 2025	BMO Field, Toronto (N)	Ivory Coast	1–0	2025 Canadian Shield	Just	26,345	
426	10 June 2025	BMO Field, Toronto (N)	Ukraine	1–2	2025 Canadian Shield	Stamenić	18,849	
427	5 September 2025	GIO Stadium, Canberra (A)	Australia	0–1	Soccer Ashes		19,115	
428	9 September 2025	Mount Smart Stadium, Auckland (H)	Australia	1–3	Soccer Ashes	Wood	18,213	
429	9 October 2025	Stadion Śląski, Chorzów (A)	Poland	0–1	Friendly		30,412	
430	14 October 2025	Ullevaal Stadion, Oslo (A)	Norway	1–1	Friendly	Surman	17,562	
431	15 November 2025	Chase Stadium, Fort Lauderdale (N)	Colombia	1–2	Friendly	Ben Old	—	
432	18 November 2025	Sports Illustrated Stadium, Harrison (N)	Ecuador	0–2	Friendly		—	
433	27 March 2026	Eden Park, Auckland (H)	Finland	0–2	2026 FIFA Series		17,603	
434	30 March 2026	Eden Park, Auckland (H)	Chile	4–1	2026 FIFA Series	Barbarouses, Just, Randall, Waine	14,327	
435	2 June 2026	Chase Stadium, Fort Lauderdale (N)	Haiti	0–4	Friendly		16,000	
436	7 June 2026	Raymond James Stadium, Tampa (N)	England	0–1	Friendly		25,889	
437	15 June 2026	SoFi Stadium, Inglewood (N)	Iran	2–2	2026 FIFA World Cup	Just (2)	70,108	
438	21 June 2026	BC Place, Vancouver (N)	Egypt	1–3	2026 FIFA World Cup	Surman	52,497	
439	26 June 2026	BC Place, Vancouver (N)	Belgium	1–5	2026 FIFA World Cup	Just	52,497	
440	24 September 2026	Tongliang Long Stadium, Chongqing (N)	Palestine	2–2	Friendly	Waine, Randall	—	
441	27 September 2026	Longxing Football Stadium, Chongqing (A)	China	3–0	Friendly	Bindon, Waine, Parker-Price	15,160	
442	1 October 2026	Nissan Stadium, Yokohama (N)	Panama	1–1 (5–3p)	2026 Kirin Cup Soccer	Stamenić	8,513	
443	5 October 2026	Japan National Stadium, Tokyo (N)	Japan	1–2	2026 Kirin Cup Soccer	Old	61,812	
443	12 November 2026	Mount Smart Stadium, Auckland (H)	India	5–0	Friendly	Varghese (o.g.), Randall (2), Wood, Bayliss	10,379	
444	15 November 2026	Te Kaha, Christchurch (H) One New Zealand Stadium	India	3–0	Friendly	Finn Surman, James McGarry, Wood		

Notes

1. A: Match played behind closed doors due to the COVID-19 pandemic in Asia.
2. B: Match was abandoned at halftime after Qatar winger, Yusuf Abdurisag, was alleged to have racially abused New Zealand centre-back, Michael Boxall.

== Streaks ==
- Most wins in a row
  - 7, 11 October 2024 – 7 June 2025
- Most matches without a loss
  - 8, 10 September 2024 – 7 June 2025
- Most draws in a row: 1
  - 9 June 2022
  - 23 March 2023
  - 13 October 2023
  - 10 September 2024
  - 14 October 2025
- Most losses in a row
  - 4, 10 June 2025 – 9 October 2025
- Most matches without a win
  - 8, 10 June 2025 – 27 March 2026

== Record by opponent ==
Team	Pld	W	D	L	GF	GA	GD	WPCT
Australia	5	0	0	5	1	9	−8	0.00
Bahrain	1	1	0	0	1	0	+1	100.00
Belgium	1	0	0	1	1	5	−4	0.00
Chile	1	1	0	0	4	1	+3	100.00
China	3	2	1	0	5	1	+4	66.67
Colombia	1	0	0	1	1	2	−1	0.00
Costa Rica	1	0	0	1	0	1	−1	0.00
Curaçao	1	1	0	0	2	1	+1	100.00
DR Congo	1	0	1	0	1	1	0	0.00
Ecuador	1	0	0	1	0	2	−2	0.00
Egypt	2	0	0	2	1	4	−3	0.00
England	1	0	0	1	0	1	−1	0.00
Fiji	2	2	0	0	11	0	+11	100.00
Finland	1	0	0	1	0	2	−2	0.00
Gambia	1	1	0	0	2	0	+2	100.00
Greece	1	0	0	1	0	2	−2	0.00
Haiti	1	0	0	1	0	4	−4	0.00
India	1	1	0	0	5	0	+5	100.00
Iran	1	0	1	0	2	2	0	0.00
Ivory Coast	1	1	0	0	1	0	+1	100.00
Japan	1	0	0	1	1	2	−1	0.00
Jordan	1	0	0	1	1	3	−2	0.00
Malaysia	1	1	0	0	4	0	+4	100.00
Mexico	1	0	0	1	0	3	−3	0.00
New Caledonia	2	2	0	0	10	1	+9	100.00
Norway	1	0	1	0	1	1	0	0.00
Oman	1	0	1	0	0	0	0	0.00
Palestine	1	0	1	0	2	2	0	0.00
Panama	1	0	1	0	1	1	0	0.00
Papua New Guinea	1	1	0	0	1	0	+1	100.00
Peru	1	0	0	1	0	1	−1	0.00
Poland	1	0	0	1	0	1	−1	0.00
Republic of Ireland	1	0	1	0	1	1	0	0.00
Samoa	1	1	0	0	8	0	+8	100.00
Solomon Islands	2	2	0	0	8	0	+8	100.00
Sweden	1	0	0	1	1	4	−3	0.00
Tahiti	3	3	0	0	9	0	+9	100.00
Tunisia	1	0	1	0	0	0	0	0.00
Ukraine	1	0	0	1	1	2	−1	0.00
United States	1	0	1	0	1	1	0	0.00
Vanuatu	3	3	0	0	15	1	+14	100.00
Total	55	23	10	22	103	62	+41	41.82

Source: A-International results

== See also ==
- New Zealand national football team
- New Zealand at the FIFA World Cup
- New Zealand at the FIFA Confederations Cup
- New Zealand at the OFC Nations Cup
