= Argentina national football team results (2020–present) =

National football team results (2020–present)

This page details the match results and statistics of the Argentina national football team from 2020 to present.

== Key ==
Key to matches

- (H) = Home ground
- (A) = Away ground
- (N) = Neutral ground
- Ref. = References

Key to record by opponent

- Pld = Matches played
- W = Matches won
- D = Matches drawn
- L = Matches lost
- GF = Goals for
- GA = Goals against
- GD = Goal difference
- WPCT = Win percentage

== Results ==
Argentina's score is shown first in each case.

No.	Date	Time	Venue	Opponents	Score	Competition	Argentina scorers	Opposition scorers	Referee	Attendance	Ref.
1,001	8 October 2020	21:30 (UTC−3)	La Bombonera, Buenos Aires (H)	Ecuador	1–0	2022 FIFA World Cup qualification	Messi 13' (pen.)		Roberto Tobar	0	
1,002	13 October 2020	16:00 (UTC−4)	Estadio Hernando Siles, La Paz (A)	Bolivia	2–1	2022 FIFA World Cup qualification	La. Martínez 45', J. Correa 79'	Moreno 24'	Diego Haro	0	
1,003	12 November 2020	21:00 (UTC−3)	La Bombonera, Buenos Aires (H)	Paraguay	1–1	2022 FIFA World Cup qualification	González 41'	Á. Romero 21' (pen.)	Raphael Claus	0	
1,004	17 November 2020	19:30 (UTC−5)	Estadio Nacional, Lima (A)	Peru	2–0	2022 FIFA World Cup qualification	González 17', La. Martínez 28'		Wilmar Roldán	0	
1,005	3 June 2021	21:00 (UTC−3)	Estadio Único Madre de Ciudades, Santiago del Estero (H)	Chile	1–1	2022 FIFA World Cup qualification	Messi 23' (pen.)	Sánchez 36'	Jesús Valenzuela	0	
1,006	8 June 2021	18:00 (UTC−5)	Estadio Metropolitano, Barranquilla (A)	Colombia	2–2	2022 FIFA World Cup qualification	Romero 3', Paredes 8'	Muriel 51' (pen.), Borja 90+4'	Roberto Tobar	0	
1,007	14 June 2021	18:00 (UTC−3)	Estádio Olímpico Nilton Santos, Rio de Janeiro (N)	Chile	1–1	2021 Copa América	Messi 33'	Vargas 57'	Wilmar Roldán	0	
1,008	18 June 2021	21:00 (UTC−3)	Estádio Nacional Mané Garrincha, Brasília (N)	Uruguay	1–0	2021 Copa América	Rodríguez 13'		Wilton Sampaio	0	
1,009	21 June 2021	21:00 (UTC−3)	Estádio Nacional Mané Garrincha, Brasília (N)	Paraguay	1–0	2021 Copa América	Gómez 10'		Jesús Valenzuela	0	
1,010	28 June 2021	20:00 (UTC−4)	Arena Pantanal, Cuiabá (N)	Bolivia	4–1	2021 Copa América	Gómez 6', Messi 33' (pen.), 42', La. Martínez 65'	Saavedra 60'	Andrés Rojas	0	
1,011	3 July 2021	22:00 (UTC−3)	Estádio Olímpico Pedro Ludovico, Goiânia (N)	Ecuador	3–0	2021 Copa América	De Paul 40', La. Martínez 84', Messi 90+3'		Wilton Sampaio	0	
1,012	6 July 2021	22:00 (UTC−3)	Estádio Nacional Mané Garrincha, Brasília (N)	Colombia	1–1 (3–2 p)	2021 Copa América	La. Martínez 7'	Díaz 61'	Jesús Valenzuela	0	
1,013	10 July 2021	21:00 (UTC−3)	Estádio do Maracanã, Rio de Janeiro (A)	Brazil	1–0	2021 Copa América	Di María 22'		Esteban Ostojich	7,800	
1,014	2 September 2021	20:00 (UTC−4)	Olympic Stadium, Caracas (A)	Venezuela	3–1	2022 FIFA World Cup qualification	La. Martínez 45+2', J. Correa 71', Á. Correa 74'	Soteldo 90+4' (pen.)	Leodán González	6,000	
—	5 September 2021	16:00 (UTC−3)	Arena Corinthians, São Paulo (A)	Brazil	–	2022 FIFA World Cup qualification				—	
1,015	9 September 2021	20:30 (UTC−3)	Estadio Monumental, Buenos Aires (H)	Bolivia	3–0	2022 FIFA World Cup qualification	Messi 14', 64', 88'		Kevin Ortega	17,000	
1,016	7 October 2021	20:30 (UTC−3)	Estadio Defensores del Chaco, Asunción (A)	Paraguay	0–0	2022 FIFA World Cup qualification			Anderson Daronco	34,000	
1,017	10 October 2021	20:30 (UTC−3)	Estadio Monumental, Buenos Aires (H)	Uruguay	3–0	2022 FIFA World Cup qualification	Messi 38', De Paul 44', La. Martínez 62'		Roberto Tobar	35,000	
1,018	14 October 2021	20:30 (UTC−3)	Estadio Monumental, Buenos Aires (H)	Peru	1–0	2022 FIFA World Cup qualification	La. Martínez 43'		Wilton Sampaio	36,000	
1,019	12 November 2021	20:30 (UTC−3)	Estadio Campeón del Siglo, Montevideo (A)	Uruguay	1–0	2022 FIFA World Cup qualification	Di María 7'		Alexis Herrera	30,000	
1,020	16 November 2021	20:30 (UTC−3)	Estadio San Juan del Bicentenario, San Juan (H)	Brazil	0–0	2022 FIFA World Cup qualification			Andrés Cunha	25,000	
1,021	27 January 2022	21:15 (UTC−3)	Estadio Zorros del Desierto, Calama (A)	Chile	2–1	2022 FIFA World Cup qualification	Di María 7', La. Martínez 34'	Brereton 20'	Anderson Daronco	8,800	
1,022	1 February 2022	20:30 (UTC−3)	Estadio Mario Alberto Kempes, Córdoba (H)	Colombia	1–0	2022 FIFA World Cup qualification	La. Martínez 29'		Raphael Claus	50,000	
1,023	25 March 2022	20:30 (UTC−3)	La Bombonera, Buenos Aires (H)	Venezuela	3–0	2022 FIFA World Cup qualification	González 34', Di María 79', Messi 82'		Kevin Ortega	42,000	
1,024	29 March 2022	18:30 (UTC−5)	Estadio Monumental, Guayaquil (A)	Ecuador	1–1	2022 FIFA World Cup qualification	Alvarez 24'	Valencia 90+3'	Raphael Claus	59,000	
1,025	1 June 2022	19:45 (UTC+1)	Wembley Stadium, London (N)	Italy	3–0	2022 Finalissima	La. Martínez 28', Di María 45+1', Dybala 90+4'		Piero Maza	87,112	
1,026	5 June 2022	19:00 (UTC+2)	El Sadar, Pamplona (N)	Estonia	5–0	Friendly	Messi 8' (pen.), 45', 47', 71', 76'		Urs Schnyder	18,332	
1,027	23 September 2022	21:00 (UTC−4)	Hard Rock Stadium, Miami Gardens (N)	Honduras	3–0	Friendly	La. Martínez 16', Messi 45+2' (pen.), 69'		Rubiel Vazquez	64,420	
1,028	27 September 2022	21:00 (UTC−4)	Red Bull Arena, Harrison (N)	Jamaica	3–0	Friendly	Alvarez 13', Messi 86', 89'		Marco Ortíz	25,000	
1,029	16 November 2022	19:30 (UTC+4)	Mohammed bin Zayed Stadium, Abu Dhabi (A)	United Arab Emirates	5–0	Friendly	Alvarez 17', Di María 25', 36', Messi 44', J. Correa 60'		Ibrahim Nour El Din	—	
1,030	22 November 2022	13:00 (UTC+3)	Lusail Iconic Stadium, Lusail (N)	Saudi Arabia	1–2	2022 FIFA World Cup	Messi 10' (pen.)	Al-Shehri 48', Al-Dawsari 53'	Slavko Vinčić	88,012	
1,031	26 November 2022	22:00 (UTC+3)	Lusail Iconic Stadium, Lusail (N)	Mexico	2–0	2022 FIFA World Cup	Messi 64', Fernández 87'		Daniele Orsato	88,966	
1,032	30 November 2022	22:00 (UTC+3)	Stadium 974, Doha (N)	Poland	2–0	2022 FIFA World Cup	Mac Allister 46', Alvarez 67'		Danny Makkelie	44,089	
1,033	3 December 2022	22:00 (UTC+3)	Ahmad bin Ali Stadium, Al Rayyan (N)	Australia	2–1	2022 FIFA World Cup	Messi 35', Alvarez 57'	Fernández 77' (o.g.)	Szymon Marciniak	45,032	
1,034	9 December 2022	22:00 (UTC+3)	Lusail Iconic Stadium, Lusail (N)	Netherlands	2–2 (a.e.t.) (4–3 p)	2022 FIFA World Cup	Molina 35', Messi 73' (pen.)	Weghorst 83', 90+11'	Antonio Mateu Lahoz	88,235	
1,035	13 December 2022	22:00 (UTC+3)	Lusail Iconic Stadium, Lusail (N)	Croatia	3–0	2022 FIFA World Cup	Messi 34' (pen.), Alvarez 39', 69'		Daniele Orsato	88,966	
1,036	18 December 2022	18:00 (UTC+3)	Lusail Iconic Stadium, Lusail (N)	France	3–3 (a.e.t.) (4–2 p)	2022 FIFA World Cup	Messi 23' (pen.), 108', Di María 36'	Mbappé 80' (pen.), 81', 118' (pen.)	Szymon Marciniak	88,966	
1,037	23 March 2023	20:30 (UTC−3)	Estadio Monumental, Buenos Aires (H)	Panama	2–0	Friendly	Almada 78', Messi 89'		Cristian Ferreyra	83,214	
1,038	28 March 2023	20:30 (UTC−3)	Estadio Único Madre de Ciudades, Santiago del Estero (H)	Curaçao	7–0	Friendly	Messi 20', 33', 37', González 23', Fernández 35', Di María 78' (pen.), Montiel 87'		Gustavo Tejera	42,000	
1,039	15 June 2023	20:00 (UTC+8)	Workers' Stadium, Beijing (N)	Australia	2–0	Friendly	Messi 2', Pezzella 68'		Ma Ning	68,000	
1,040	19 June 2023	19:30 (UTC+7)	Gelora Bung Karno Stadium, Jakarta (A)	Indonesia	2–0	Friendly	Paredes 38', Romero 55'		Muhammad Usaid bin Jamal	56,060	
1,041	7 September 2023	21:00 (UTC−3)	Estadio Monumental, Buenos Aires (H)	Ecuador	1–0	2026 FIFA World Cup qualification	Messi 78'		Wilmar Roldán	84,500	
1,042	12 September 2023	16:00 (UTC−4)	Estadio Hernando Siles, La Paz (A)	Bolivia	3–0	2026 FIFA World Cup qualification	Fernández 31', Tagliafico 42', González 83'		Esteban Ostojich	24,000	
1,043	12 October 2023	21:00 (UTC−3)	Estadio Monumental, Buenos Aires (H)	Paraguay	1–0	2026 FIFA World Cup qualification	Otamendi 3'		Raphael Claus	80,000	
1,044	17 October 2023	21:00 (UTC−5)	Estadio Nacional, Lima (A)	Peru	2–0	2026 FIFA World Cup qualification	Messi 32', 42'		Jesús Valenzuela	37,675	
1,045	16 November 2023	21:00 (UTC−3)	La Bombonera, Buenos Aires (H)	Uruguay	0–2	2026 FIFA World Cup qualification		Araújo 41', Núñez 87'	Wilmar Roldán	51,900	
1,046	21 November 2023	21:30 (UTC−3)	Estádio do Maracanã, Rio de Janeiro (A)	Brazil	1–0	2026 FIFA World Cup qualification	Otamendi 63'		Piero Maza	68,138	
1,047	22 March 2024	20:00 (UTC−4)	Lincoln Financial Field, Philadelphia (N)	El Salvador	3–0	Friendly	Romero 16', Fernández 42', Lo Celso 52'		Victor Rivas	—	
1,048	26 March 2024	19:50 (UTC−7)	Los Angeles Memorial Coliseum, Los Angeles (N)	Costa Rica	3–1	Friendly	Di María 52', Mac Allister 56', La. Martínez 57'	Ugalde 34'	Josef Mickelson	20,000	
1,049	9 June 2024	17:00 (UTC−5)	Soldier Field, Chicago (N)	Ecuador	1–0	Friendly	Di María 40'		Drew Fischer	51,090	
1,050	14 June 2024	20:00 (UTC−4)	Commanders Field, Landover (N)	Guatemala	4–1	Friendly	Messi 12', 77', La. Martínez 39' (pen.), 66'	Li. Martínez 4' (o.g.)	Joe Dickerson	65,000	
1,051	20 June 2024	20:00 (UTC−4)	Mercedes-Benz Stadium, Atlanta (N)	Canada	2–0	2024 Copa América	Alvarez 49', La. Martínez 88'		Jesús Valenzuela	70,564	
1,052	25 June 2024	21:00 (UTC−4)	MetLife Stadium, East Rutherford (N)	Chile	1–0	2024 Copa América	La. Martínez 88'		Andrés Matonte	81,106	
1,053	29 June 2024	20:00 (UTC−4)	Hard Rock Stadium, Miami Gardens (N)	Peru	2–0	2024 Copa América	La. Martínez 47', 86'		César Ramos	64,972	
1,054	4 July 2024	20:00 (UTC−5)	NRG Stadium, Houston (N)	Ecuador	1–1 (4–2 p)	2024 Copa América	Li. Martínez 35'	K. Rodríguez 90+2'	Andrés Matonte	69,456	
1,055	9 July 2024	20:00 (UTC−4)	MetLife Stadium, East Rutherford (N)	Canada	2–0	2024 Copa América	Alvarez 22', Messi 51'		Piero Maza	80,102	
1,056	14 July 2024	21:22 (UTC−4)	Hard Rock Stadium, Miami Gardens (N)	Colombia	1–0 (a.e.t.)	2024 Copa América	La. Martínez 112'		Raphael Claus	65,300	
1,057	5 September 2024	21:00 (UTC−4)	Estadio Monumental, Buenos Aires (H)	Chile	3–0	2026 FIFA World Cup qualification	Mac Allister 48', Alvarez 84', Dybala 90+1'		Jesús Valenzuela	52,160	
1,058	10 September 2024	17:30 (UTC−5)	Estadio Metropolitano, Barranquilla (A)	Colombia	1–2	2026 FIFA World Cup qualification	González 48'	Mosquera 25', J. Rodríguez 60' (pen.)	Piero Maza	45,000	
1,059	10 October 2024	17:00 (UTC−4)	Estadio Monumental, Maturín (A)	Venezuela	1–1	2026 FIFA World Cup qualification	Otamendi 13'	Rondón 65'	Gustavo Tejera	50,000	
1,060	15 October 2024	21:00 (UTC−3)	Estadio Monumental, Buenos Aires (H)	Bolivia	6–0	2026 FIFA World Cup qualification	Messi 19', 84', 86', La. Martínez 43', Alvarez 45+3', Almada 69'		Kevin Ortega	60,000	
1,061	14 November 2024	20:30 (UTC−3)	Estadio Defensores del Chaco, Asunción (A)	Paraguay	1–2	2026 FIFA World Cup qualification	La. Martínez 11'	Sanabria 19', Alderete 47'	Anderson Daronco	32,200	
1,062	19 November 2024	21:45 (UTC−3)	La Bombonera, Buenos Aires (H)	Peru	1–0	2026 FIFA World Cup qualification	La. Martínez 55'		Wilmar Roldán	52,000	
1,063	21 March 2025	20:30 (UTC−3)	Estadio Centenario, Montevideo (A)	Uruguay	1–0	2026 FIFA World Cup qualification	Almada 68'		Juan Gabriel Benítez	55,000	
1,064	25 March 2025	21:00 (UTC−3)	Estadio Monumental, Buenos Aires (H)	Brazil	4–1	2026 FIFA World Cup qualification	Alvarez 4', Fernández 12', Mac Allister 37', Simeone 71'	Cunha 26'	Andrés Rojas	85,015	
1,065	5 June 2025	21:00 (UTC−4)	Estadio Nacional Julio Martínez Prádanos, Santiago (A)	Chile	1–0	2026 FIFA World Cup qualification	Alvarez 16'		Jesús Valenzuela	45,000	
1,066	10 June 2025	21:00 (UTC−3)	Estadio Monumental, Buenos Aires (H)	Colombia	1–1	2026 FIFA World Cup qualification	Almada 81'	Díaz 24'	Juan Gabriel Benítez	77,791	
1,067	4 September 2025	20:30 (UTC−3)	Estadio Monumental, Buenos Aires (H)	Venezuela	3–0	2026 FIFA World Cup qualification	Messi 39', 80', La. Martínez 76'		Piero Maza	76,490	
1,068	9 September 2025	18:00 (UTC−5)	Estadio Monumental, Guayaquil (A)	Ecuador	0–1	2026 FIFA World Cup qualification		Valencia 45+13' (pen.)	Wilmar Roldán	—	
1,069	10 October 2025	20:00 (UTC−4)	Hard Rock Stadium, Miami Gardens (N)	Venezuela	1–0	Friendly	Lo Celso 31'		Tori Penso	—	
1,070	14 October 2025	18:00 (UTC−4)	Chase Stadium, Fort Lauderdale (N)	Puerto Rico	6–0	Friendly	Mac Allister 14', 36', Montiel 23', Echevarria 65' (o.g.), La. Martínez 79', 84'		Armando Villarreal	18,000	
1,071	14 November 2025	17:00 (UTC+1)	Estádio 11 de Novembro, Luanda (A)	Angola	2–0	Friendly	La. Martínez 43', Messi 82'		Hillary Hambaba	43,000	
1,072	27 March 2026	20:15 (UTC−3)	La Bombonera, Buenos Aires (H)	Mauritania	2–1	Friendly	Fernández 17', Paz 32'	Lefort 90+4'	Derlis López	45,760	
1,073	31 March 2026	20:15 (UTC−3)	La Bombonera, Buenos Aires (H)	Zambia	5–0	Friendly	Alvarez 4', Messi 43', Otamendi 50' (pen.), Chanda 68' (o.g.), Barco 90+4'		Alexis Herrera	45,760	
1,074	6 June 2026	19:00 (UTC−5)	Kyle Field, College Station (N)	Honduras	2–0	Friendly	La. Martínez 37' (pen.), Simeone 54'		Victor Rivas	91,102	
1,075	9 June 2026	19:30 (UTC−5)	Jordan-Hare Stadium, Auburn (N)	Iceland	3–0	Friendly	Barco 8', Messi 72' (pen.), Almada 86'		Rosendo Mendoza	88,043	
1,076	16 June 2026	20:00 (UTC−5)	Arrowhead Stadium, Kansas City (N)	Algeria	3–0	2026 FIFA World Cup	Messi 17', 60', 76'		Szymon Marciniak	69,045	
1,077	22 June 2026	12:00 (UTC−5)	AT&T Stadium, Arlington (N)	Austria	2–0	2026 FIFA World Cup	Messi 38', 90+5'		Amin Omar	70,649	
1,078	27 June 2026	21:00 (UTC−5)	AT&T Stadium, Arlington (N)	Jordan	3–1	2026 FIFA World Cup	Lo Celso 19', La. Martínez 31' (pen.), Messi 80'	Al-Taamari 55'	István Kovács	70,649	
1,079	3 July 2026	21:00 (UTC−4)	Hard Rock Stadium, Miami Gardens (N)	Cape Verde	3–2 (a.e.t.)	2026 FIFA World Cup	Messi 29', Li. Martínez 92', Diney 111' (o.g.)	Duarte 59', Lopes Cabral 103'	Drew Fischer	64,478	
1,080	7 July 2026	12:00 (UTC−4)	Mercedes-Benz Stadium, Atlanta (N)	Egypt	3–2	2026 FIFA World Cup	Romero 79', Messi 83', Fernández 90+2'	Ibrahim 15', Ziko 67'	François Letexier	68,239	
1,081	11 July 2026	20:00 (UTC−5)	Arrowhead Stadium, Kansas City (N)	Switzerland	3–1 (a.e.t.)	2026 FIFA World Cup	Mac Allister 10', Alvarez 112', La. Martínez 120+1'	Ndoye 67'	João Pinheiro	69,045	
1,082	15 July 2026	15:00 (UTC−4)	Mercedes-Benz Stadium, Atlanta (N)	England	2–1	2026 FIFA World Cup	Fernández 85', La. Martínez 90+2'	Gordon 55'	Ismail Elfath	68,239	
1,083	19 July 2026	15:00 (UTC−4)	MetLife Stadium, East Rutherford (N)	Spain	0–1 (a.e.t.)	2026 FIFA World Cup		Torres 106'	Slavko Vinčić	80,663	
1,084	30 September 2026	21:00 (UTC−3)	Estadio Mario Alberto Kempes, Córdoba (H)	Bolivia	4–0	Friendly	La. Martínez 19', Paz 29', Romero 54', López 86'		Jhon Ospina	28,500	
1,085	3 October 2026	21:00 (UTC−3)	Estadio Monumental, Buenos Aires (H)	Burkina Faso	7–0	Friendly	La. Martínez 4', Diallo 8' (o.g.), Prestianni 12', Paz 35', Alvarez 36', Mastantuono 57', Simeone 90+3'		José Cabero	—	
1,086	6 October 2026	20:00 (UTC−3)	Estadio Monumental, Buenos Aires (H)	Benin	3–0	Friendly	Otamendi 48', Paz 61', Messi 71' (pen.)		Fernando Véjar	85,000	
1,087	13 November 2026			Uruguay	2–1	Friendly					

Notes

1. A: Match held behind closed doors due to the COVID-19 pandemic in South America.
2. B: Matches due to be held in March 2021 were postponed due to travel and quarantine restrictions caused by the COVID-19 pandemic. These matches were instead played in September and October 2021.
3. C: Argentina's match with Brazil during qualification for the 2022 FIFA World Cup was suspended after 10 minutes when officials from Brazilian health authority ANVISA intervened after it was alleged that four Argentine players based in the United Kingdom – Emiliano Buendía, Emiliano Martínez, Giovani Lo Celso and Cristian Romero – had broken quarantine rules. Following an investigation, the four players were suspended for Argentina's final two qualification matches in March 2022 and the match was ordered to be replayed at a later date. The match was to be replayed on 21 September 2022, but was cancelled on 16 August.
4. D: The declared attendance was greater than the stadium's official capacity.

== Record by opponent ==
Team	Pld	W	D	L	GF	GA	GD	WPCT
Algeria	1	1	0	0	3	0	+3	100.00
Angola	1	1	0	0	2	0	+2	100.00
Australia	2	2	0	0	4	1	+3	100.00
Austria	1	1	0	0	2	0	+2	100.00
Benin	1	1	0	0	3	0	+3	100.00
Bolivia	6	6	0	0	22	2	+20	100.00
Brazil	4	3	1	0	6	1	+5	75.00
Burkina Faso	1	1	0	0	7	0	+7	100.00
Canada	2	2	0	0	4	0	+4	100.00
Cape Verde	1	1	0	0	3	2	+1	100.00
Chile	6	4	2	0	9	3	+6	66.67
Colombia	6	2	3	1	7	6	+1	33.33
Costa Rica	1	1	0	0	3	1	+2	100.00
Croatia	1	1	0	0	3	0	+3	100.00
Curaçao	1	1	0	0	7	0	+7	100.00
Ecuador	7	4	2	1	8	3	+5	57.14
Egypt	1	1	0	0	3	2	+1	100.00
El Salvador	1	1	0	0	3	0	+3	100.00
England	1	1	0	0	2	1	+1	100.00
Estonia	1	1	0	0	5	0	+5	100.00
France	1	0	1	0	3	3	0	0.00
Guatemala	1	1	0	0	4	1	+3	100.00
Honduras	2	2	0	0	5	0	+5	100.00
Iceland	1	1	0	0	3	0	+3	100.00
Indonesia	1	1	0	0	2	0	+2	100.00
Italy	1	1	0	0	3	0	+3	100.00
Jamaica	1	1	0	0	3	0	+3	100.00
Jordan	1	1	0	0	3	1	+2	100.00
Mauritania	1	1	0	0	2	1	+1	100.00
Mexico	1	1	0	0	2	0	+2	100.00
Netherlands	1	0	1	0	2	2	0	0.00
Panama	1	1	0	0	2	0	+2	100.00
Paraguay	5	2	2	1	4	3	+1	40.00
Peru	5	5	0	0	8	0	+8	100.00
Poland	1	1	0	0	2	0	+2	100.00
Puerto Rico	1	1	0	0	6	0	+6	100.00
Saudi Arabia	1	0	0	1	1	2	−1	0.00
Spain	1	0	0	1	0	1	−1	0.00
Switzerland	1	1	0	0	3	1	+2	100.00
United Arab Emirates	1	1	0	0	5	0	+5	100.00
Uruguay	5	4	0	1	6	2	+4	80.00
Venezuela	5	4	1	0	11	2	+9	80.00
Zambia	1	1	0	0	5	0	+5	100.00
Total	86	67	13	6	191	41	+150	77.91

Updated to match(es) played on 6 October 2026. Source: Results
