= Argentina national football team results (1980–1999) =

National football team results (1980–1999)

This page details the match results and statistics of the Argentina national football team from 1980 to 1999.

== Key ==
Key to matches

- Att.=Match attendance
- (H)=Home ground
- (A)=Away ground
- (N)=Neutral ground

Key to record by opponent

- Pld=Games played
- W=Games won
- D=Games drawn
- L=Games lost
- GF=Goals for
- GA=Goals against

== Results ==
Argentina's score is shown first in each case.

No.	Date	Venue	Opponents	Score	Competition	Argentina scorers	Att.	Ref.
516	30 April 1980	Estadio Monumental, Buenos Aires (H)	(Republic of Ireland) League of Ireland XI	1–0	Friendly	Maradona	75,000	
517	13 May 1980	Wembley Stadium, London (A)	England	1–3	Friendly	Passarella	92,000	
518	16 May 1980	Lansdowne Road, Dublin (A)	Republic of Ireland	1–0	Friendly	Valencia	30,100	
519	21 May 1980	Praterstadion, Vienna (A)	Austria	5–1	Friendly	Santamaría, Luque, Maradona (3)	67,500	
520	18 September 1980	Estadio Ciudad de Mendoza, Mendoza (H)	Chile	2–2	Friendly	R. Díaz, Valencia	—	
521	9 October 1980	Estadio Monumental, Buenos Aires (H)	Bulgaria	2–0	Friendly	Santamaría, R. Díaz	40,000	
522	12 October 1980	Estadio Monumental, Buenos Aires (H)	Poland	2–1	Friendly	Passarella, Maradona	43,804	
523	15 October 1980	Estadio Monumental, Buenos Aires (H)	Czechoslovakia	1–0	Friendly	R. Díaz	75,000	
524	4 December 1980	Estadio José María Minella, Mar del Plata (H)	Soviet Union	1–1	Friendly	Maradona	31,598	
525	16 December 1980	Estadio Chateau Carreras, Córdoba (H)	Switzerland	5–0	Friendly	R. Díaz, Luque, Valencia, Maradona, Passarella	12,000	
526	1 January 1981	Estadio Centenario, Montevideo (N)	West Germany	2–1	1980 Mundialito	Kaltz (o.g.), R. Díaz	60,000	
527	4 January 1981	Estadio Centenario, Montevideo (N)	Brazil	1–1	1980 Mundialito	Maradona	60,000	
528	28 October 1981	Estadio Monumental, Buenos Aires (H)	Poland	1–2	Friendly	Passarella	40,000	
529	11 November 1981	Estadio Monumental, Buenos Aires (H)	Czechoslovakia	1–1	Friendly	Gallego	60,000	
530	9 March 1982	Estadio José María Minella, Mar Del Plata (H)	Czechoslovakia	0–0	Friendly		25,000	
531	24 March 1982	Estadio Monumental, Buenos Aires (H)	West Germany	1–1	Friendly	Calderón	69,000	
532	14 April 1982	Estadio Monumental, Buenos Aires (H)	Soviet Union	1–1	Friendly	R. Díaz	50,000	
533	5 May 1982	José Amalfitani Stadium, Buenos Aires (H)	Bulgaria	2–1	Friendly	R. Díaz, Passarella	37,000	
534	12 May 1982	Estadio Gigante de Arroyito, Rosario (H)	Romania	1–0	Friendly	R. Díaz	40,000	
535	13 June 1982	Camp Nou, Barcelona (N)	Belgium	0–1	1982 FIFA World Cup		95,000	
536	18 June 1982	Estadio José Rico Pérez, Alicante (N)	Hungary	4–1	1982 FIFA World Cup	Bertoni, Maradona (2), Ardiles	32,093	
537	23 June 1982	Estadio José Rico Pérez, Alicante (N)	El Salvador	2–0	1982 FIFA World Cup	Passarella, Bertoni	32,300	
538	29 June 1982	Sarrià Stadium, Barcelona (N)	Italy	1–2	1982 FIFA World Cup	Passarella	43,000	
539	2 July 1982	Sarrià Stadium, Barcelona (N)	Brazil	1–3	1982 FIFA World Cup	R. Díaz	44,000	
540	12 May 1983	Santiago (A)	Chile	2–2	Friendly	Alonso, Gareca	20,000	
541	23 June 1983	José Amalfitani Stadium, Buenos Aires (H)	Chile	1–0	Friendly	Morete	25,000	
542	14 July 1983	Estadio Defensores del Chaco, Asunción (A)	Paraguay	0–1	Copa Félix Bogado		—	
543	21 July 1983	José Amalfitani Stadium, Buenos Aires (H)	Paraguay	0–0	Copa Félix Bogado		30,000	
544	10 August 1983	Atahualpa Olympic Stadium, Quito (A)	Ecuador	2–2	1983 Copa América	Burruchaga (2)	50,000	
545	24 August 1983	Estadio Monumental, Buenos Aires (H)	Brazil	1–0	1983 Copa América	Gareca	70,000	
546	7 September 1983	Estadio Monumental, Buenos Aires (H)	Ecuador	2–2	1983 Copa América	Ramos, Burruchaga	40,000	
547	14 September 1983	Maracanã Stadium, Rio de Janeiro (A)	Brazil	0–0	1983 Copa América		75,000	
548	14 January 1984	Eden Gardens, Kolkata (N)	India	1–0	1984 Nehru Cup	Gareca	—	
549	17 January 1984	Eden Gardens, Kolkata (N)	Poland	1–1	1984 Nehru Cup	Ponce	—	
550	20 January 1984	Eden Gardens, Kolkata (N)	China	0–1	1984 Nehru Cup		—	
551	17 June 1984	Estádio do Morumbi, São Paulo (A)	Brazil	0–0	Friendly		32,000	
552	18 July 1984	Estadio Centenario, Montevideo (A)	Uruguay	0–1	Friendly		56,000	
553	2 August 1984	Estadio Monumental, Buenos Aires (H)	Uruguay	0–0	Friendly		—	
554	24 August 1984	Estadio El Campín, Bogotá (A)	Colombia	0–1	Friendly		35,000	
555	1 September 1984	Stadion Wankdorf, Bern (A)	Switzerland	2–0	Friendly	Ponce, Dertycia	8,000	
556	5 September 1984	King Baudouin Stadium, Brussels (A)	Belgium	2–0	Friendly	Trobbiani, Ruggeri	7,853	
557	12 September 1984	Rheinstadion, Düsseldorf (A)	West Germany	3–1	Friendly	Ponce (2), Burruchaga	45,000	
558	18 September 1984	Monterrey (A)	Mexico	1–1	Friendly	Burruchaga	—	
559	25 October 1984	José Amalfitani Stadium, Buenos Aires (H)	Mexico	1–1	Friendly	Gareca	25,776	
560	28 April 1985	Asunción (A)	Paraguay	0–1	Friendly		25,000	
561	5 May 1985	Estádio Fonte Nova, Salvador (A)	Brazil	1–2	Friendly	Burruchaga	77,258	
562	9 May 1985	Estadio Monumental, Buenos Aires (H)	Paraguay	1–1	Friendly	Maradona	—	
563	14 May 1985	Estadio Monumental, Buenos Aires (H)	Chile	2–0	Friendly	Maradona, Burruchaga	—	
564	26 May 1985	Estadio Polideportivo de Pueblo Nuevo, San Cristóbal (A)	Venezuela	3–2	1986 FIFA World Cup qualification	Maradona (2), Passarella	30,000	
565	2 June 1985	Estadio El Campín, Bogotá (A)	Colombia	3–1	1986 FIFA World Cup qualification	Pasculli (2), Burruchaga	53,000	
566	9 June 1985	Estadio Monumental, Buenos Aires (H)	Venezuela	3–0	1986 FIFA World Cup qualification	Russo, Clausen, Maradona	35,000	
567	16 June 1985	Estadio Monumental, Buenos Aires (H)	Colombia	1–0	1986 FIFA World Cup qualification	Valdano	26,000	
568	23 June 1985	Estadio Nacional, Lima (A)	Peru	0–1	1986 FIFA World Cup qualification		45,000	
569	30 June 1985	Estadio Monumental, Buenos Aires (H)	Peru	2–2	1986 FIFA World Cup qualification	Pasculli, Gareca	75,000	
570	14 November 1985	Los Angeles (N)	Mexico	1–1	Friendly	Maradona	42,501	
571	17 November 1985	Puebla (A)	Mexico	1–1	Friendly	Ruggeri	47,000	
572	26 March 1986	Parc des Princes, Paris (A)	France	0–2	Friendly		40,045	
573	30 April 1986	Ullevaal Stadion, Oslo (A)	Norway	0–1	Friendly		15,058	
574	4 May 1986	Ramat Gan Stadium, Ramat Gan (A)	Israel	7–2	Friendly	Almirón (3), Maradona (2), Borghi, Tapia	35,000	
575	2 June 1986	Estadio Olímpico Universitario, Mexico City (N)	South Korea	3–1	1986 FIFA World Cup	Valdano (2), Ruggeri	60,000	
576	5 June 1986	Estadio Cuauhtémoc, Puebla (N)	Italy	1–1	1986 FIFA World Cup	Maradona	32,000	
577	10 June 1986	Estadio Olímpico Universitario, Mexico City (N)	Bulgaria	2–0	1986 FIFA World Cup	Valdano, Burruchaga	65,000	
578	16 June 1986	Estadio Cuauhtémoc, Puebla (N)	Uruguay	1–0	1986 FIFA World Cup	Pasculli	26,000	
579	22 June 1986	Estadio Azteca, Mexico City (N)	England	2–1	1986 FIFA World Cup	Maradona (2)	114,580	
580	25 June 1986	Estadio Azteca, Mexico City (N)	Belgium	2–0	1986 FIFA World Cup	Maradona (2)	114,500	
581	29 June 1986	Estadio Azteca, Mexico City (N)	West Germany	3–2	1986 FIFA World Cup	Brown, Valdano, Burruchaga	114,600	
582	10 June 1987	Letzigrund, Zürich (N)	Italy	1–3	Friendly	Maradona	30,000	
583	20 June 1987	Estadio Monumental, Buenos Aires (H)	Paraguay	0–1	Friendly		10,000	
584	27 June 1987	Estadio Monumental, Buenos Aires (N)	Peru	1–1	1987 Copa América	Maradona	40,000	
585	2 July 1987	Estadio Monumental, Buenos Aires (N)	Ecuador	3–0	1987 Copa América	Caniggia, Maradona (2)	30,000	
586	9 July 1987	Estadio Monumental, Buenos Aires (N)	Uruguay	0–1	1987 Copa América		75,000	
587	11 July 1987	Estadio Monumental, Buenos Aires (N)	Colombia	1–2	1987 Copa América	Caniggia	15,000	
588	16 December 1987	José Amalfitani Stadium, Buenos Aires (H)	West Germany	1–0	Friendly	Burruchaga	50,000	
589	31 March 1988	Olympiastadion, West Berlin (N)	Soviet Union	2–4	Four Nations Tournament	Troglio, Maradona	10,000	
590	2 April 1988	Olympiastadion, West Berlin (N)	West Germany	0–1	Four Nations Tournament		25,000	
591	6 July 1988	Football Park, Adelaide (N)	Saudi Arabia	2–2	Australia Bicentenary Gold Cup	H. Díaz (2)	9,664	
592	10 July 1988	Olympic Park Stadium, Melbourne (N)	Brazil	0–0	Australia Bicentenary Gold Cup		13,850	
593	14 July 1988	Sydney Football Stadium, Sydney (N)	Australia	1–4	Australia Bicentenary Gold Cup	Ruggeri	18,985	
594	16 July 1988	Bruce Stadium, Canberra (N)	Saudi Arabia	2–0	Australia Bicentenary Gold Cup	Simeone, Dertycia	2,729	
595	12 October 1988	Ramón Sánchez Pizjuán Stadium, Seville (A)	Spain	1–1	Copa Hispanidad	Caniggia	60,025	
596	9 March 1989	Estadio Metropolitano, Barranquilla (A)	Colombia	0–1	Friendly		60,000	
597	13 April 1989	Estadio Monumental, Guayaquil (A)	Ecuador	2–2	Friendly	Moreno (2)	30,000	
598	20 April 1989	Santiago (A)	Chile	1–1	Friendly	Airez	26,000	
599	2 July 1989	Estádio Serra Dourada, Goiânia (N)	Chile	1–0	1989 Copa América	Caniggia	40,000	
600	4 July 1989	Estádio Serra Dourada, Goiânia (N)	Ecuador	0–0	1989 Copa América		12,000	
601	8 July 1989	Estádio Serra Dourada, Goiânia (N)	Uruguay	1–0	1989 Copa América	Caniggia	18,000	
602	10 July 1989	Estádio Serra Dourada, Goiânia (N)	Bolivia	0–0	1989 Copa América		5,000	
603	12 July 1989	Maracanã Stadium, Rio de Janeiro (N)	Brazil	0–2	1989 Copa América		110,000	
604	14 July 1989	Maracanã Stadium, Rio de Janeiro (N)	Uruguay	0–2	1989 Copa América		45,000	
605	16 July 1989	Maracanã Stadium, Rio de Janeiro (N)	Paraguay	0–0	1989 Copa América		90,000	
606	21 December 1989	Stadio Sant'Elia, Cagliari (A)	Italy	0–0	Friendly		29,635	
607	17 January 1990	Los Angeles (N)	Mexico	0–2	Friendly		23,675	
608	28 March 1990	Hampden Park, Glasgow (A)	Scotland	0–1	Friendly		51,537	
609	3 May 1990	Praterstadion, Vienna (A)	Austria	1–1	Friendly	Burruchaga	45,000	
610	8 May 1990	Stadion Wankdorf, Bern (A)	Switzerland	1–1	Friendly	Balbo	10,000	
611	22 May 1990	Ramat Gan Stadium, Ramat Gan (A)	Israel	2–1	Friendly	Maradona, Caniggia	45,000	
612	8 June 1990	San Siro, Milan (N)	Cameroon	0–1	1990 FIFA World Cup		73,780	
613	13 June 1990	Stadio San Paolo, Naples (N)	Soviet Union	2–0	1990 FIFA World Cup	Troglio, Burruchaga	55,759	
614	18 June 1990	Stadio San Paolo, Naples (N)	Romania	1–1	1990 FIFA World Cup	Monzón	52,733	
615	24 June 1990	Stadio delle Alpi, Turin (N)	Brazil	1–0	1990 FIFA World Cup	Caniggia	61,381	
616	30 June 1990	Stadio Comunale, Florence	Yugoslavia	0–0 (a.e.t.) (3–2p)	1990 FIFA World Cup		38,971	
617	3 July 1990	Stadio San Paolo, Naples (N)	Italy	1–1 (a.e.t.) (4–3p)	1990 FIFA World Cup	Caniggia	59,978	
618	8 July 1990	Stadio Olimpico, Rome (N)	West Germany	0–1	1990 FIFA World Cup		73,603	
619	19 February 1991	Estadio Gigante de Arroyito, Rosario (H)	Hungary	2–0	Friendly	Franco, Mohamed	40,000	
620	13 March 1991	José Amalfitani Stadium, Buenos Aires (H)	Mexico	0–0	Friendly		40,000	
621	27 March 1991	José Amalfitani Stadium, Buenos Aires (H)	Brazil	3–3	Friendly	Ferreyra, Franco, Bisconti	50,000	
622	19 May 1991	Stanford Stadium, Stanford (A)	United States	1–0	Friendly	Franco	31,761	
623	23 May 1991	Old Trafford, Manchester (N)	Soviet Union	1–1	1991 England Challenge Cup	Ruggeri	23,743	
624	25 May 1991	Wembley Stadium, London (N)	England	2–2	1991 England Challenge Cup	García, Franco	44,497	
625	27 June 1991	Pinheirão, Curitiba (A)	Brazil	1–1	Friendly	Caniggia	44,429	
626	8 July 1991	Estadio Nacional, Santiago (N)	Venezuela	3–0	1991 Copa América	Batistuta (2), Caniggia	50,000	
627	10 July 1991	Estadio Nacional, Santiago (N)	Chile	1–0	1991 Copa América	Batistuta	75,000	
628	12 July 1991	Estadio Municipal de Concepción, Concepción (N)	Paraguay	4–1	1991 Copa América	Batistuta, Simeone, Astrada, Caniggia	40,000	
629	14 July 1991	Estadio Nacional, Santiago (N)	Peru	3–2	1991 Copa América	Latorre, Craviotto, García	80,000	
630	17 July 1991	Estadio Nacional, Santiago (N)	Brazil	3–2	1991 Copa América	Franco (2), Batistuta	50,000	
631	19 July 1991	Estadio Nacional, Santiago (N)	Chile	0–0	1991 Copa América		65,000	
632	21 July 1991	Estadio Nacional, Santiago (N)	Colombia	2–1	1991 Copa América	Simeone, Batistuta	50,000	
633	31 May 1992	National Stadium, Tokyo (N)	Japan	1–0	1992 Kirin Cup	Batistuta	60,000	
634	3 June 1992	Gifu Nagaragawa Stadium, Gifu (N)	Wales	1–0	1992 Kirin Cup	Batistuta	31,000	
635	18 June 1992	Estadio Monumental, Buenos Aires (H)	Australia	2–0	Friendly	Batistuta (2)	30,000	
636	23 September 1992	Estadio Centenario, Montevideo (A)	Uruguay	0–0	Copa Lipton		35,000	
637	16 October 1992	King Fahd International Stadium, Riyadh (N)	Ivory Coast	4–0	1992 King Fahd Cup	Batistuta (2), Altamirano, Acosta	15,000	
638	20 October 1992	King Fahd International Stadium, Riyadh (N)	Saudi Arabia	3–1	1992 King Fahd Cup	Rodríguez, Caniggia, Simeone	75,000	
639	26 November 1992	La Bombonera, Buenos Aires (H)	Poland	2–0	Friendly	Craviotto, Medina Bello	20,000	
640	18 February 1993	Estadio Monumental, Buenos Aires (H)	Brazil	1–1	AFA Centenary Cup	Mancuso	65,000	
641	24 February 1993	Estadio José María Minella, Mar del Plata (H)	Denmark	1–1 (a.e.t.) (5–4p)	Artemio Franchi Trophy	Caniggia	40,000	
642	17 June 1993	Estadio George Capwell, Guayaquil (N)	Bolivia	1–0	1993 Copa América	Batistuta	16,000	
643	20 June 1993	Estadio George Capwell, Guayaquil (N)	Mexico	1–1	1993 Copa América	Ruggeri	16,000	
644	23 June 1993	Estadio George Capwell, Guayaquil (N)	Colombia	1–1	1993 Copa América	Simeone	45,000	
645	27 June 1993	Estadio Monumental, Guayaquil (N)	Brazil	1–1 (a.e.t.) (6–5p)	1993 Copa América	Rodríguez	25,000	
646	1 July 1993	Estadio Monumental, Guayaquil (N)	Colombia	0–0 (a.e.t.) (6–5p)	1993 Copa América		15,000	
647	4 July 1993	Estadio Monumental, Guayaquil (N)	Mexico	2–1	1993 Copa América	Batistuta (2)	40,000	
648	1 August 1993	Estadio Nacional, Lima (A)	Peru	1–0	1994 FIFA World Cup qualification	Batistuta	27,000	
649	8 August 1993	Estadio Defensores del Chaco, Asunción (A)	Paraguay	3–1	1994 FIFA World Cup qualification	Medina Bello (2), Redondo	46,500	
650	15 August 1993	Estadio Metropolitano, Barranquilla (A)	Colombia	1–2	1994 FIFA World Cup qualification	Medina Bello	70,000	
651	22 August 1993	Estadio Monumental, Buenos Aires (H)	Peru	2–1	1994 FIFA World Cup qualification	Batistuta, Medina Bello	70,000	
652	29 August 1993	Estadio Monumental, Buenos Aires (H)	Paraguay	0–0	1994 FIFA World Cup qualification		47,000	
653	5 September 1993	Estadio Monumental, Buenos Aires (H)	Colombia	0–5	1994 FIFA World Cup qualification		53,000	
654	31 October 1993	Sydney Football Stadium, Sydney (A)	Australia	1–1	1994 FIFA World Cup qualification play-off	Balbo	43,967	
655	17 November 1993	Estadio Monumental, Buenos Aires (H)	Australia	1–0	1994 FIFA World Cup qualification play-off	Tobin (o.g.)	59,768	
656	15 December 1993	Miami Orange Bowl, Miami (N)	Germany	2–1	Friendly	H. Díaz, Balbo	33,000	
657	23 March 1994	Recife (A)	Brazil	0–2	Friendly		85,000	
658	20 April 1994	Salta (H)	Morocco	3–1	Salta Cup	Balbo, Maradona, Pérez	35,000	
659	18 May 1994	Estadio Nacional, Santiago (A)	Chile	3–3	Friendly	Chamot, Balbo, Ruggeri	62,000	
660	25 May 1994	Estadio Monumental, Guayaquil (A)	Ecuador	0–1	Friendly		45,000	
661	31 May 1994	Ramat Gan Stadium, Ramat Gan (A)	Israel	3–0	Friendly	Batistuta (2), Caniggia	30,000	
662	4 June 1994	Stadion Maksimir, Zagreb (A)	Croatia	0–0	Friendly		38,000	
663	21 June 1994	Foxboro Stadium, Foxborough (N)	Greece	4–0	1994 FIFA World Cup	Batistuta (3), Maradona	54,456	
664	25 June 1994	Foxboro Stadium, Foxborough (N)	Nigeria	2–1	1994 FIFA World Cup	Caniggia (2)	54,453	
665	30 June 1994	Cotton Bowl, Dallas (N)	Bulgaria	0–2	1994 FIFA World Cup		63,998	
666	3 July 1994	Rose Bowl, Pasedena (N)	Romania	2–3	1994 FIFA World Cup	Batistuta, Balbo	90,469	
667	16 November 1994	Estadio Nacional, Santiago (A)	Chile	3–0	Friendly	Rambert, Espina, Escudero	30,000	
668	21 December 1994	Estadio Monumental, Buenos Aires (H)	Romania	1–0	Friendly	Pérez	43,000	
669	27 December 1994	Estadio Monumental, Buenos Aires (H)	FR Yugoslavia	1–0	Friendly	Rambert	27,780	
670	8 January 1995	King Fahd International Stadium, Riyadh (N)	Japan	5–1	1995 King Fahd Cup	Rambert, Ortega, Batistuta (2), Chamot	10,000	
671	10 January 1995	King Fahd International Stadium, Riyadh (N)	Nigeria	0–0	1995 King Fahd Cup		20,000	
672	13 January 1995	King Fahd International Stadium, Riyadh (N)	Denmark	0–2	1995 King Fahd Cup		35,000	
673	14 February 1995	Mendoza (H)	Bulgaria	4–1	Friendly	Gallardo (2), Yankov (o.g.), Rambert	30,000	
674	13 May 1995	Ellis Park Stadium, Johannesburg (A)	South Africa	1–1	Nelson Mandela Cup	Gallardo	40,000	
675	31 May 1995	Córdoba (H)	Peru	1–0	Córdoba Municipality Cup	Fabbri	15,000	
676	14 June 1995	Rosario (H)	Paraguay	2–1	Friendly	Berti, Acosta	20,000	
–	22 June 1995	Estadio Malvinas Argentinas, Mendoza (H)	Slovakia	6–0	Friendly	Gallardo (2), Zanetti, Batistuta (2), Simeone	16,000	
677	30 June 1995	Estadio Centenario, Quilmes (H)	Australia	2–0	Friendly	Balbo, Batistuta	25,000	
678	8 July 1995	Estadio Parque Artigas, Paysandú (N)	Bolivia	2–1	1995 Copa América	Batistuta, Balbo	20,000	
679	11 July 1995	Estadio Parque Artigas, Paysandú (N)	Chile	4–0	1995 Copa América	Batistuta (2), Simeone, Balbo	16,000	
680	14 July 1995	Estadio Parque Artigas, Paysandú (N)	United States	0–3	1995 Copa América		8,000	
681	17 July 1995	Estadio Atilio Paiva Olivera, Rivera (N)	Brazil	2–2 (a.e.t.) (2–4p)	1995 Copa América	Balbo, Batistuta	24,000	
682	20 September 1995	Santiago Bernabéu Stadium, Madrid (A)	Spain	1–2	Friendly	Ortega	32,000	
683	11 October 1995	Estadio Monumental, Buenos Aires (H)	Colombia	0–0	Friendly		6,000	
684	8 November 1995	Estadio Monumental, Buenos Aires (H)	Brazil	0–1	Copa 50imo Aniversario de Clarín		60,000	
685	21 December 1995	Mendoza (H)	Venezuela	6–0	Friendly	Esnáider (2), G. López (2), Cardoso, Netto	6,000	
686	24 April 1996	Estadio Monumental, Buenos Aires (H)	Bolivia	3–1	1998 FIFA World Cup qualification	Ortega (2), Batistuta	49,750	
687	2 June 1996	Estadio Olímpico Atahualpa, Quito (A)	Ecuador	0–2	1998 FIFA World Cup qualification		41,500	
688	7 July 1996	Estadio Nacional, Lima (A)	Peru	0–0	1998 FIFA World Cup qualification		43,675	
689	1 September 1996	Estadio Monumental, Buenos Aires (H)	Paraguay	1–1	1998 FIFA World Cup qualification	Batistuta	65,500	
690	9 October 1996	Estadio Polideportivo de Pueblo Nuevo, San Cristóbal (A)	Venezuela	5–2	1998 FIFA World Cup qualification	Ortega, Sorín, Simeone, Morales, Albornoz	30,000	
691	15 December 1996	Estadio Monumental, Buenos Aires (H)	Chile	1–1	1998 FIFA World Cup qualification	Batistuta	59,970	
692	28 December 1996	Estadio José María Minella, Mar del Plata (H)	FR Yugoslavia	2–3	Friendly	Esnáider, Morales	19,683	
693	12 January 1997	Estadio Centenario, Montevideo (A)	Uruguay	0–0	1998 FIFA World Cup qualification		62,000	
694	12 February 1997	Estadio Metropolitano, Barranquilla (A)	Colombia	1–0	1998 FIFA World Cup qualification	C. López	70,000	
695	2 April 1997	Estadio Hernando Siles, La Paz (A)	Bolivia	1–2	1998 FIFA World Cup qualification	Gorosito	44,372	
696	30 April 1997	Estadio Monumental, Buenos Aires (H)	Ecuador	2–1	1998 FIFA World Cup qualification	Ortega, Crespo	62,300	
697	8 June 1997	Estadio Monumental, Buenos Aires (H)	Peru	2–0	1998 FIFA World Cup qualification	Crespo, Simeone	56,069	
698	11 June 1997	Estadio Félix Capriles, Cochabamba (N)	Ecuador	0–0	1997 Copa América		17,000	
699	14 June 1997	Estadio Félix Capriles, Cochabamba (N)	Chile	2–0	1997 Copa América	Berti, Gallardo	9,000	
700	17 June 1997	Estadio Félix Capriles, Cochabamba (N)	Paraguay	1–1	1997 Copa América	Gallardo	8,000	
701	21 June 1997	Estadio Olímpico Patria, Sucre (N)	Peru	1–2	1997 Copa América	Gallardo	9,000	
702	6 July 1997	Estadio Defensores del Chaco, Asunción (A)	Paraguay	2–1	1998 FIFA World Cup qualification	Gallardo, Verón	30,000	
703	20 July 1997	Estadio Monumental, Buenos Aires (H)	Venezuela	2–0	1998 FIFA World Cup qualification	Crespo, Paz	48,000	
704	10 September 1997	Estadio Nacional, Santiago (A)	Chile	2–1	1998 FIFA World Cup qualification	Gallardo, C. López	73,644	
705	12 October 1997	Estadio Monumental, Buenos Aires (H)	Uruguay	0–0	1998 FIFA World Cup qualification		52,000	
706	16 November 1997	La Bombonera, Buenos Aires (H)	Colombia	1–1	1998 FIFA World Cup qualification	Cáceres	40,000	
707	19 February 1998	Estadio Malvinas Argentinas, Mendoza (H)	Romania	2–1	Friendly	Vivas, Ayala	35,000	
708	24 February 1998	Estadio José María Minella, Mar del Plata (H)	FR Yugoslavia	3–1	Friendly	Crespo (3)	35,000	
709	10 March 1998	José Amalfitani Stadium, Buenos Aires (H)	Bulgaria	2–0	Friendly	Batistuta, C. López	25,000	
710	15 April 1998	Jerusalem (A)	Israel	1–2	Friendly	Cagna	14,000	
711	22 April 1998	Lansdowne Road, Dublin (A)	Republic of Ireland	2–0	Friendly	Batistuta, Ortega	38,500	
712	29 April 1998	Maracanã Stadium, Rio de Janeiro (A)	Brazil	1–0	Friendly	C. López	99,697	
713	14 May 1998	Estadio Chateau Carreras, Córdoba (H)	Bosnia and Herzegovina	5–0	Friendly	Batistuta (3), Zanetti, Ortega	46,700	
714	19 May 1998	Estadio Malvinas Argentinas, Mendoza (H)	Chile	1–0	Friendly	Batistuta	47,000	
715	25 May 1998	Estadio Monumental, Buenos Aires (H)	South Africa	2–0	Friendly	Batistuta, Ortega	40,000	
716	14 June 1998	Stadium de Toulouse, Toulouse (N)	Japan	1–0	1998 FIFA World Cup	Batistuta	33,500	
717	21 June 1998	Parc des Princes, Paris (N)	Jamaica	5–0	1998 FIFA World Cup	Ortega (2), Batistuta (3)	45,500	
718	26 June 1998	Parc Lescure, Bordeaux (N)	Croatia	1–0	1998 FIFA World Cup	Pineda	31,800	
719	30 June 1998	Stade Geoffroy-Guichard, Saint-Étienne (N)	England	2–2 (a.e.t.) (4–3p)	1998 FIFA World Cup	Batistuta, Zanetti	30,600	
720	4 July 1998	Stade Vélodrome, Marseille (N)	Netherlands	1–2	1998 FIFA World Cup	C. López	55,000	
721	3 February 1999	Estadio José Pachencho Romero, Maracaibo (A)	Venezuela	2–0	Friendly	Samuel, Gallardo	30,000	
722	11 February 1999	Los Angeles Memorial Coliseum, Los Angeles (N)	Mexico	1–0	Friendly	Sorín	91,585	
723	31 March 1999	Amsterdam Arena, Amsterdam (A)	Netherlands	1–1	Friendly	Batistuta	51,000	
724	9 June 1999	Soldier Field, Chicago (N)	Mexico	2–2	Copa Reebok	Cruz, G. López	64,433	
725	13 June 1999	Robert F. Kennedy Memorial Stadium, Washington, D.C. (A)	United States	0–1	Friendly		40,119	
726	26 June 1999	José Amalfitani Stadium, Buenos Aires (H)	Lithuania	0–0	Friendly		11,314	
727	1 July 1999	Estadio Feliciano Cáceres, Luque (N)	Ecuador	3–1	1999 Copa América	Simeone, Palermo (2)	20,000	
728	4 July 1999	Estadio Feliciano Cáceres, Luque (N)	Colombia	0–3	1999 Copa América		18,000	
729	7 July 1999	Estadio Feliciano Cáceres, Luque (N)	Uruguay	2–0	1999 Copa América	González, Palermo	20,000	
730	11 July 1999	Estadio Antonio Oddone Sarubbi, Ciudad del Este (N)	Brazil	1–2	1999 Copa América	Sorín	26,000	
731	4 September 1999	Estadio Monumental, Buenos Aires (H)	Brazil	2–0	Zero Hora 35th Anniversary Cup	Verón, Crespo	50,000	
732	7 September 1999	Estádio Beira-Rio, Porto Alegre (A)	Brazil	2–4	Zero Hora 35th Anniversary Cup	Ayala, Ortega	49,500	
733	13 October 1999	Estadio Chateau Carreras, Córdoba (H)	Colombia	2–1	Friendly	Batistuta, Ortega	42,000	
734	17 November 1999	Estadio de La Cartuja, Seville (A)	Spain	2–0	Friendly	González, Pochettino	65,000	

Notes

1. A: The match against League of Ireland XI in 1980 is considered official by FIFA.
2. B: Match suspended after 85 minutes following a pitch invasion.
3. C: Argentina were awarded the trophy as the visiting team.
4. D: The match against Slovakia in 1995 was originally considered as a full international by the Argentine Football Association but has since been removed from the official list. The opponent has also been reported as a Slovakia League XI.

== Record by opponent ==
Team	Pld	W	D	L	GF	GA	GD	WPCT
Australia	5	3	1	1	7	5	+2	60.00
Austria	2	1	1	0	6	2	+4	50.00
Belgium	3	2	0	1	4	1	+3	66.67
Bolivia	5	3	1	1	7	4	+3	60.00
Bosnia and Herzegovina	1	1	0	0	5	0	+5	100.00
Brazil	21	5	9	7	22	27	−5	23.81
Bulgaria	6	5	0	1	12	4	+8	83.33
Cameroon	1	0	0	1	0	1	−1	0.00
Chile	15	9	6	0	26	10	+16	60.00
China	1	0	0	1	0	1	−1	0.00
Colombia	15	5	4	6	13	19	−6	33.33
Croatia	2	1	1	0	1	0	+1	50.00
Czechoslovakia	3	1	2	0	2	1	+1	33.33
Denmark	2	0	1	1	1	3	−2	0.00
Ecuador	10	3	5	2	14	11	+3	30.00
El Salvador	1	1	0	0	2	0	+2	100.00
England	4	1	2	1	7	8	−1	25.00
FR Yugoslavia	3	2	0	1	6	4	+2	66.67
France	1	0	0	1	0	2	−2	0.00
Germany	1	1	0	0	2	1	+1	100.00
Greece	1	1	0	0	4	0	+4	100.00
Hungary	2	2	0	0	6	1	+5	100.00
India	1	1	0	0	1	0	+1	100.00
Israel	4	3	0	1	13	5	+8	75.00
Italy	5	0	3	2	4	7	−3	0.00
Ivory Coast	1	1	0	0	4	0	+4	100.00
Jamaica	1	1	0	0	5	0	+5	100.00
Japan	3	3	0	0	7	1	+6	100.00
(Republic of Ireland) League of Ireland XI	1	1	0	0	1	0	+1	100.00
Lithuania	1	0	1	0	0	0	0	0.00
Mexico	10	2	7	1	10	10	0	20.00
Morocco	1	1	0	0	3	1	+2	100.00
Netherlands	2	0	1	1	2	3	−1	0.00
Nigeria	2	1	1	0	2	1	+1	50.00
Norway	1	0	0	1	0	1	−1	0.00
Paraguay	13	4	6	3	14	10	+4	30.77
Peru	10	5	3	2	13	9	+4	50.00
Poland	4	2	1	1	6	4	+2	50.00
Republic of Ireland	2	2	0	0	3	0	+3	100.00
Romania	5	3	1	1	7	5	+2	60.00
Saudi Arabia	3	2	1	0	7	3	+4	66.67
Scotland	1	0	0	1	0	1	−1	0.00
South Africa	2	1	1	0	3	1	+2	50.00
South Korea	1	1	0	0	3	1	+2	100.00
Soviet Union	5	1	3	1	7	7	0	20.00
Spain	3	1	1	1	4	3	+1	33.33
Switzerland	3	2	1	0	8	1	+7	66.67
United States	3	1	0	2	1	4	−3	33.33
Uruguay	10	3	4	3	4	4	0	30.00
Venezuela	7	7	0	0	24	4	+20	100.00
Wales	1	1	0	0	1	0	+1	100.00
West Germany	7	4	1	2	10	7	+3	57.14
Yugoslavia	1	0	1	0	0	0	0	0.00
Total	219	101	70	48	314	198	+116	46.12

Source: Results
