= Ecuador national football team results (2020–present) =

This page details the match results and statistics of the Ecuador national football team from 2020 to present.

== Key ==
Key to matches

- Att.=Match attendance
- (H)=Home ground
- (A)=Away ground
- (N)=Neutral ground

Key to record by opponent

- Pld=Games played
- W=Games won
- D=Games drawn
- L=Games lost
- GF=Goals for
- GA=Goals against

== Results ==
Ecuador's score is shown first in each case.

No.	Date	Venue	Opponents	Score	Competition	Ecuador scorers	Att.	Ref.
526	8 October 2020	La Bombonera, Buenos Aires (A)	Argentina	0–1	2022 FIFA World Cup qualification		0	
527	13 October 2020	Estadio Rodrigo Paz Delgado, Quito (H)	Uruguay	4–2	2022 FIFA World Cup qualification	M. Caicedo, Estrada (2), Plata	0	
528	12 November 2020	Estadio Hernando Siles, La Paz (A)	Bolivia	3–2	2022 FIFA World Cup qualification	B. Caicedo, Mena, Gruezo	0	
529	17 November 2020	Estadio Rodrigo Paz Delgado, Quito (H)	Colombia	6–1	2022 FIFA World Cup qualification	Arboleda, Mena, Estrada, Arreaga, Plata, Estupiñán	0	
530	29 March 2021	Estadio Banco Guayaquil, Sangolquí (H)	Bolivia	2–1	Friendly	Martínez, Estrada	0	
531	4 June 2021	Estádio Beira-Rio, Porto Alegre (A)	Brazil	0–2	2022 FIFA World Cup qualification		0	
532	8 June 2021	Estadio Rodrigo Paz Delgado, Quito (H)	Peru	1–2	2022 FIFA World Cup qualification	Plata	0	
533	13 June 2021	Arena Pantanal, Cuiabá (N)	Colombia	0–1	2021 Copa América		0	
534	20 June 2021	Estádio Olímpico Nilton Santos, Rio de Janeiro (N)	Venezuela	2–2	2021 Copa América	Preciado, Plata	0	
535	23 June 2021	Estádio Olímpico Pedro Ludovico, Goiânia (N)	Peru	2–2	2021 Copa América	Tapia (o.g.), Preciado	0	
536	27 June 2021	Estádio Olímpico Pedro Ludovico, Goiânia (N)	Brazil	1–1	2021 Copa América	Mena	0	
537	3 July 2021	Estádio Olímpico Pedro Ludovico, Goiânia (N)	Argentina	0–3	2021 Copa América		0	
538	2 September 2021	Estadio Rodrigo Paz Delgado, Quito (H)	Paraguay	2–0	2022 FIFA World Cup qualification	Torres, Estrada	12,000	
539	5 September 2021	Estadio Rodrigo Paz Delgado, Quito (H)	Chile	0–0	2022 FIFA World Cup qualification		12,000	
540	9 September 2021	Estadio Campeón del Siglo, Montevideo (A)	Uruguay	0–1	2022 FIFA World Cup qualification		15,000	
541	7 October 2021	Estadio Monumental, Guayaquil (H)	Bolivia	3–0	2022 FIFA World Cup qualification	Estrada, E. Valencia (2)	16,000	
542	10 October 2021	Olympic Stadium, Caracas (A)	Venezuela	1–2	2022 FIFA World Cup qualification	E. Valencia	10,000	
543	14 October 2021	Estadio Metropolitano, Barranquilla (A)	Colombia	0–0	2022 FIFA World Cup qualification		35,000	
544	27 October 2021	Bank of America Stadium, Charlotte (N)	Mexico	3–2	Friendly	Quiñónez, Corozo, Chalá	—	
545	11 November 2021	Estadio Rodrigo Paz Delgado, Quito (H)	Venezuela	1–0	2022 FIFA World Cup qualification	Hincapié	25,000	
546	16 November 2021	Estadio San Carlos de Apoquindo, Santiago (A)	Chile	2–0	2022 FIFA World Cup qualification	Estupiñán, M. Caicedo	12,000	
547	4 December 2021	PNC Stadium, Houston (N)	El Salvador	1–1	Friendly	Carcelén	10,709	
548	27 January 2022	Estadio Rodrigo Paz Delgado, Quito (H)	Brazil	1–1	2022 FIFA World Cup qualification	Torres	17,992	
549	1 February 2022	Estadio Nacional, Lima (A)	Peru	1–1	2022 FIFA World Cup qualification	Estrada	28,000	
550	24 March 2022	Estadio Antonio Aranda, Ciudad del Este (A)	Paraguay	1–3	2022 FIFA World Cup qualification	J. Caicedo	10,000	
551	29 March 2022	Estadio Monumental, Guayaquil (H)	Argentina	1–1	2022 FIFA World Cup qualification	E. Valencia	59,000	
552	2 June 2022	Red Bull Arena, Harrison (N)	Nigeria	1–0	Friendly	Estupiñán	—	
553	5 June 2022	Soldier Field, Chicago (N)	Mexico	0–0	Friendly		—	
554	11 June 2022	DRV PNK Stadium, Fort Lauderdale (N)	Cape Verde	1–0	Friendly	J. Caicedo	—	
555	23 September 2022	Estadio Nueva Condomina, Murcia (N)	Saudi Arabia	0–0	Friendly		—	
556	27 September 2022	Merkur Spiel-Arena, Düsseldorf (N)	Japan	0–0	Friendly		—	
557	12 November 2022	Metropolitano Stadium, Madrid (N)	Iraq	0–0	Friendly		—	
558	20 November 2022	Al Bayt Stadium, Al Khor (N)	Qatar	2–0	2022 FIFA World Cup	E. Valencia (2)	67,372	
559	25 November 2022	Khalifa International Stadium, Al Rayyan (N)	Netherlands	1–1	2022 FIFA World Cup	E. Valencia	44,833	
560	29 November 2022	Khalifa International Stadium, Al Rayyan (N)	Senegal	1–2	2022 FIFA World Cup	M. Caicedo	44,569	
561	24 March 2023	Western Sydney Stadium, Sydney (A)	Australia	1–3	Friendly	F. Torres	20,668	
562	28 March 2023	Docklands Stadium, Melbourne (A)	Australia	2–1	Friendly	Estupiñán, Pacho	27,103	
563	17 June 2023	Red Bull Arena, Harrison (N)	Bolivia	1–0	Friendly	E. Valencia	20,000	
564	20 June 2023	Subaru Park, Chester (N)	Costa Rica	3–1	Friendly	E. Valencia, Pacho, Vite	10,000	
565	7 September 2023	Estadio Monumental, Buenos Aires (A)	Argentina	0–1	2026 FIFA World Cup qualification		84,500	
566	12 September 2023	Estadio Rodrigo Paz Delgado, Quito (H)	Uruguay	2–1	2026 FIFA World Cup qualification	Torres (2)	35,613	
567	12 October 2023	Estadio Hernando Siles, La Paz (A)	Bolivia	2–1	2026 FIFA World Cup qualification	Páez, Rodríguez	34,200	
568	17 October 2023	Estadio Rodrigo Paz Delgado, Quito (H)	Colombia	0–0	2026 FIFA World Cup qualification		38,702	
569	16 November 2023	Estadio Monumental, Maturín (A)	Venezuela	0–0	2026 FIFA World Cup qualification		51,083	
570	21 November 2023	Estadio Rodrigo Paz Delgado, Quito (H)	Chile	1–0	2026 FIFA World Cup qualification	Mena	36,873	
571	21 March 2024	Red Bull Arena, Harrison (N)	Guatemala	2–0	Friendly	Yeboah, Plata	—	
572	24 March 2024	Red Bull Arena, Harrison (N)	Italy	0–2	Friendly		—	
573	9 June 2024	Soldier Field, Chicago (N)	Argentina	0–1	Friendly		—	
574	12 June 2024	Subaru Park, Chester (N)	Bolivia	3–1	Friendly	E. Valencia, Yeboah, Caicedo	—	
575	16 June 2024	Pratt & Whitney Stadium at Rentschler Field, East Hartford (N)	Honduras	2–1	Friendly	Sarmiento, Hincapié	—	
576	22 June 2024	Levi's Stadium, Santa Clara (N)	Venezuela	1–2	2024 Copa América	Sarmiento	—	
577	26 June 2024	Allegiant Stadium, Paradise (N)	Jamaica	3–1	2024 Copa América	Minda	—	
578	30 June 2024	State Farm Stadium, Glendale (N)	Mexico	0–0	2024 Copa América		62,565	
579	4 July 2024	NRG Stadium, Houston (N)	Argentina	1–1 (4–2 p)	2024 Copa América	Rodríguez	69,456	
580	6 September 2024	Estádio Couto Pereira, Curitiba (A)	Brazil	0–1	2026 FIFA World Cup qualification		36,914	
581	10 September 2024	Estadio Rodrigo Paz Delgado, Quito (H)	Peru	1–0	2026 FIFA World Cup qualification	E. Valencia	35,000	
582	10 October 2024	Estadio Rodrigo Paz Delgado, Quito (H)	Paraguay	0–0	2026 FIFA World Cup qualification		31,000	
583	15 October 2023	Estadio Centenario, Montevideo (A)	Uruguay	0–0	2026 FIFA World Cup qualification		27,112	
584	14 November 2024	Estadio Monumental, Guayaquil (H)	Bolivia	4–0	2026 FIFA World Cup qualification	E. Valencia, Plata, Minda	30,758	
585	19 November 2024	Estadio Metropolitano, Barranquilla (A)	Colombia	1–0	2026 FIFA World Cup qualification	E. Valencia	37,316	
586	21 March 2025	Estadio Rodrigo Paz Delgado, Quito (A)	Venezuela	2–1	2026 FIFA World Cup qualification	E. Valencia	41,575	
587	25 March 2025	Estadio Nacional Julio Martínez Prádanos, Santiago (A)	Chile	0–0	2026 FIFA World Cup qualification		38,996	
588	5 June 2025	Estadio Monumental, Guayaquil (H)	Brazil	0–0	2026 FIFA World Cup qualification		59,283	
589	10 June 2025	Estadio Nacional, Lima (A)	Peru	0–0	2026 FIFA World Cup qualification		33,749	
590	4 September 2025	Estadio Defensores del Chaco, Asunción (A)	Paraguay	0–0	2026 FIFA World Cup qualification		—	
591	9 September 2025	Estadio Monumental, Guayaquil (H)	Argentina	1–0	2026 FIFA World Cup qualification	E. Valencia	—	
592	10 October 2025	Q2 Stadium, Austin (A)	United States	1–1	Friendly	E. Valencia	20,738	
593	14 October 2025	Estadio Akron, Zapopan (A)	Mexico	1–1	Friendly	Alcívar	—	
594	13 November 2025	BMO Field, Toronto (A)	Canada	0–0	Friendly		—	
595	18 November 2025	Sports Illustrated Stadium, Harrison (N)	New Zealand	2–0	Friendly	Angulo, Campana	—	
596	27 March 2026	Metropolitano Stadium, Madrid (N)	Morocco	1–1	Friendly	Yeboah	—	
597	31 March 2026	Philips Stadion, Eindhoven (A)	Netherlands	1–1	Friendly	Pacho, E. Valencia	29,344	
598	30 May 2024	Sports Illustrated Stadium, Harrison (N)	Saudi Arabia	2–1	Friendly	Porozo, A. Valencia	—	
599	7 June 2024	ScottsMiracle-Gro Field, Columbus (N)	Guatemala	3–0	Friendly	Caicedo, Angulo, Estupiñán	—	
600	14 June 2026	Lincoln Financial Field, Philadelphia (N)	Ivory Coast	0–1	2026 FIFA World Cup		68,274	
601	20 June 2026	Arrowhead Stadium, Kansas City (N)	Curaçao	0–0	2026 FIFA World Cup		68,598	
602	25 June 2026	MetLife Stadium, East Rutherford (N)	Germany	2–1	2026 FIFA World Cup	Angulo, Plata	80,663	
603	30 June 2026	Estadio Azteca, Mexico City (N)	Mexico	0–2	2026 FIFA World Cup		80,824	
604	24 September 2026	Suwon World Cup Stadium, Suwon (A)	South Korea	0–3	Friendly		33,593	
605	1 October 2026	Nissan Stadium, Yokohama (A)	Japan	0–0 (5–4p)	2026 Kirin Cup Soccer		65,012	
606	5 October 2026	National Stadium, Tokyo (H)	Panama	1–1 (6–7p)	2026 Kirin Cup Soccer	J. Angulo	—	

Notes

1. A: Match held behind closed doors due to the COVID-19 pandemic in South America.
2. B: Matches due to be held in March 2021 were postponed due to travel and quarantine restrictions caused by the COVID-19 pandemic. These matches were instead played in September and October 2021.

== Record by opponent ==
Team	Pld	W	D	L	GF	GA	GD	WPCT
Argentina	7	1	2	4	3	8	−5	14.29
Australia	2	1	0	1	3	4	−1	50.00
Bolivia	7	7	0	0	20	6	+14	100.00
Brazil	5	0	3	2	2	5	−3	0.00
Canada	1	0	1	0	0	0	0	0.00
Cape Verde	1	1	0	0	1	0	+1	100.00
Chile	4	2	2	0	3	0	+3	50.00
Colombia	5	2	2	1	7	2	+5	40.00
Costa Rica	1	1	0	0	3	1	+2	100.00
Curaçao	1	0	1	0	0	0	0	0.00
El Salvador	1	0	1	0	1	1	0	0.00
Germany	1	1	0	0	2	1	+1	100.00
Guatemala	2	2	0	0	5	0	+5	100.00
Honduras	1	1	0	0	2	1	+1	100.00
Iraq	1	0	1	0	0	0	0	0.00
Italy	1	0	0	1	0	2	−2	0.00
Ivory Coast	1	0	0	1	0	1	−1	0.00
Jamaica	1	1	0	0	3	1	+2	100.00
Japan	3	0	3	0	0	0	0	0.00
Mexico	5	1	3	1	4	5	−1	20.00
Morocco	1	0	1	0	1	1	0	0.00
Netherlands	2	0	2	0	2	2	0	0.00
New Zealand	1	1	0	0	2	0	+2	100.00
Nigeria	1	1	0	0	1	0	+1	100.00
Panama	4	1	2	1	2	2	0	25.00
Paraguay	4	1	2	1	3	3	0	25.00
Peru	5	1	3	1	5	5	0	20.00
Qatar	1	1	0	0	2	0	+2	100.00
Saudi Arabia	2	1	1	0	2	1	+1	50.00
Senegal	1	0	0	1	1	2	−1	0.00
South Korea	4	3	0	1	3	3	0	75.00
United States	1	0	1	0	1	1	0	0.00
Uruguay	4	2	1	1	6	4	+2	50.00
Venezuela	6	2	2	2	7	7	0	33.33
Total	88	35	34	19	97	69	+28	39.77

Source: Results
