= Namibia national football team results (2020–present) =

Statistics of Namibia national football team

This page details the match results and statistics of the Namibia national football team from 2020 to present.

== Results ==
Namibia's score is shown first in each case.

Date	Venue	Opponents	Score	Competition	Namibia scorers	Opposition scorers	Att.	Ref.
8 October 2020	Royal Bafokeng Stadium, Rustenburg (A)	South Africa	1–1	Friendly	Limbondi 55'	Singh 19'		
13 November 2020	Stade du 26 Mars, Bamako (A)	Mali	0–1	2021 Africa Cup of Nations qualification	—	Touré 33' pen.	0 (Note: Match held behind closed doors due to the COVID-19 pandemic.)	
17 November 2020	Sam Nujoma Stadium, Windhoek (H)	Mali	1–2	2021 Africa Cup of Nations qualification	Kambindu 39'	Koita 12', Doumbia 37'	0	
19 January 2021	Limbe Stadium, Limbe (N)	Guinea	0–3	2020 African Nations Championship	—	Barry 13', 86', Sylla 45'		
23 January 2021	Limbe Stadium, Limbe (N)	Tanzania	0–1	2020 African Nations Championship	—	Mussa 65'		
27 January 2021	Limbe Stadium, Limbe (N)	Zambia	0–0	2020 African Nations Championship	—	—		
24 March 2021	—	Chad	3–0 (Note: Result awarded to Namibia after Chad were suspended from the 2021 Africa Cup of Nations qualification following government interference in football.)	2021 Africa Cup of Nations qualification	—			
28 March 2021	Sam Nujoma Stadium, Windhoek (H)	Guinea	2–1	2021 Africa Cup of Nations qualification	Shalulile 45', 77'			
7 July 2021	Wolfson Stadium, Port Elizabeth, South Africa (H)	Senegal	2–1	2021 COSAFA Cup	Papama 13', Kambindu 50'	Diène 17'		
11 July 2021	Nelson Mandela Bay Stadium, Port Elizabeth, South Africa (N)	Zimbabwe	2–0	2021 COSAFA Cup	Amini 70' o.g., Kambindu 86'	—		
13 July 2021	Wolfson Stadium, Port Elizabeth, South Africa (N)	Malawi	1–1	2021 COSAFA Cup	Kambindu 53'	Mhone 73'		
14 July 2021	Wolfson Stadium, Port Elizabeth, South Africa (N)	Mozambique	0–1	2021 COSAFA Cup	—	Melito 80'		
