= Marlon Ayoví =

Ecuadorian footballer (born 1971)

Personal information
- Full name: Marlon Riter Ayoví Mosquera
- Date of birth: 27 September 1971 (age 55)
- Place of birth: Guayaquil, Ecuador
- Height: 1.77 m (5 ft 10 in)
- Position: Defensive midfielder

Senior career*
Years	Team	Apps	(Gls)
1990–1991	Filanbanco	9	(0)
1991–1993	Filancard FC	16	(1)
1993–2005	Deportivo Quito	451	(45)
2006	Universidad Católica	12	(4)
2006–2007	Deportivo Quito	16	(0)
2007–2008	Barcelona SC	32	(1)
Total		536	(51)

International career^{‡}
1998–2007	Ecuador	76	(5)
- * Club domestic league appearances and goals as of 1 January 2008 ‡ National team caps and goals as of 1 January 2008

Marlon Riter Ayoví Mosquera (born 27 September 1971) is a retired Ecuadorian footballer. A midfielder, he played 76 times for Ecuador between 1998 and 2007.

== Career ==
Ayoví made his debut for the national squad on 14 October 1998, with a loss (1–5) in a friendly against Brazil.

He is currently contracted with Barcelona S.C in Ecuador. Ayoví was a member of the Ecuador squad for the 2002 and 2006 FIFA World Cups. He played as a defensive midfielder.
