= List of CR Flamengo players =

This is a list of notable footballers who have played for Clube de Regatas do Flamengo since the foundation of its football team in 1912.

The list comprises those players who have made 100 or more first-team appearances for the club including substitutions.

To see a list of all Flamengo players, major or minor, with a Wikipedia article, see Category:Clube de Regatas do Flamengo footballers.

== List of players ==
=== Key ===
Players are listed according to the date of their first-team debut for the club. First team appearances include: Campeonato Carioca, Campeonato Brasileiro, Copa do Brasil, Torneio Rio – São Paulo, Taça Brasil, Torneio Roberto Gomes Pedrosa, Copa Libertadores, Copa Sudamericana, Copa Mercosur, Supercopa Libertadores, Cope de Oro, Intercontinental Cup, FIFA Club World Cup and friendlies for players prior to the 21st century.

- Players in **bold** currently still play for the club.
- Players in italic currently still play professional football.
- ^{†} Include friendlies and unofficial matches.

= Member of Flamengo's Museum Hall of Fame

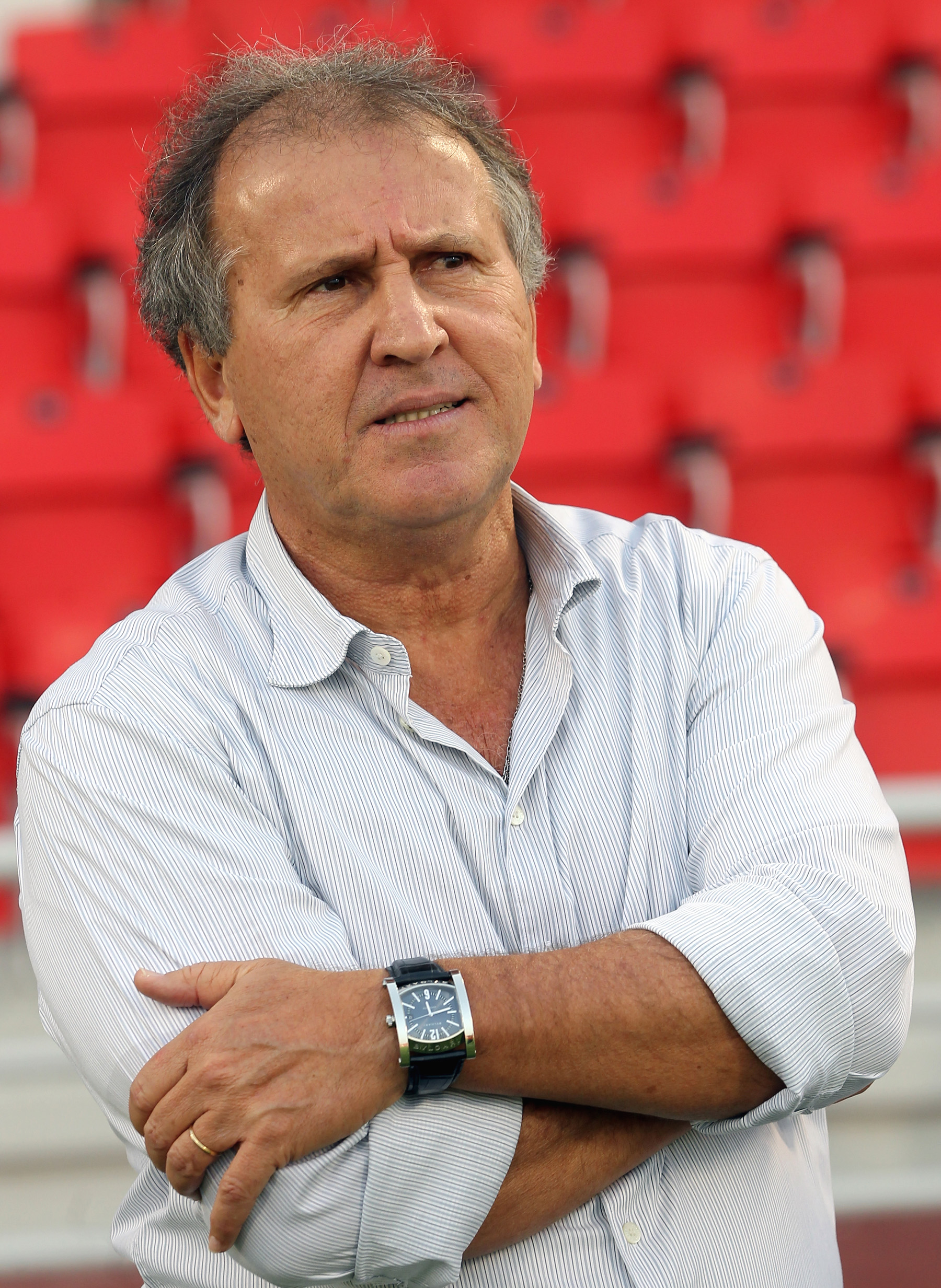
Zico, all-time top goal-scorer for Flamengo and second all-time appearances.

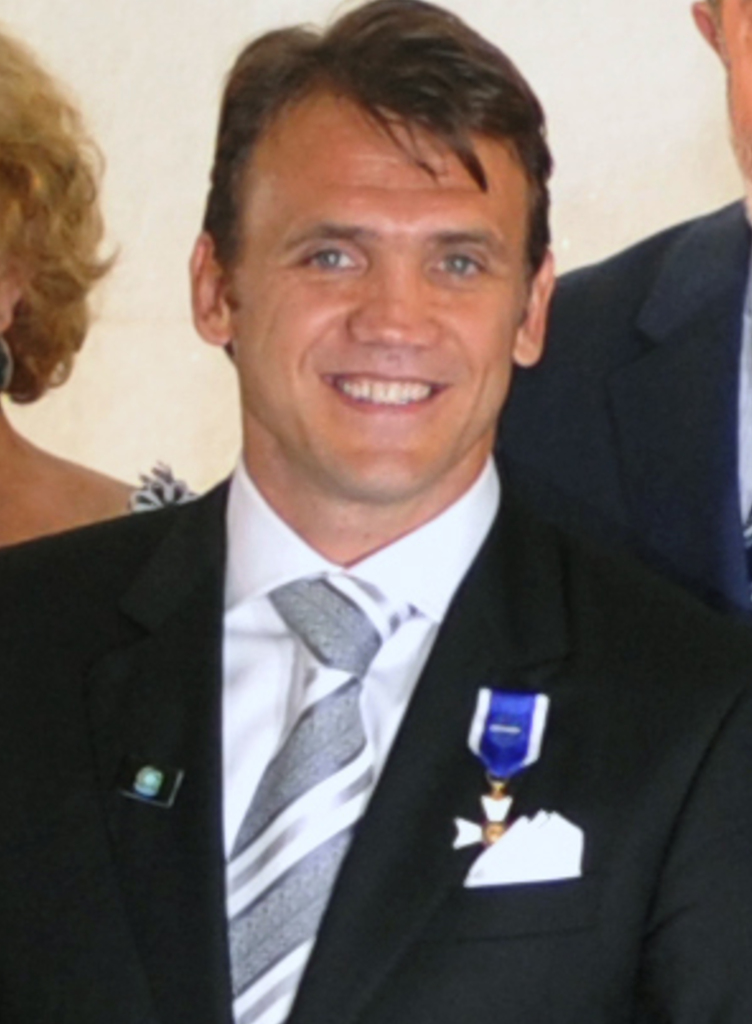
Dejan Petković played 198 matches in two different periods.

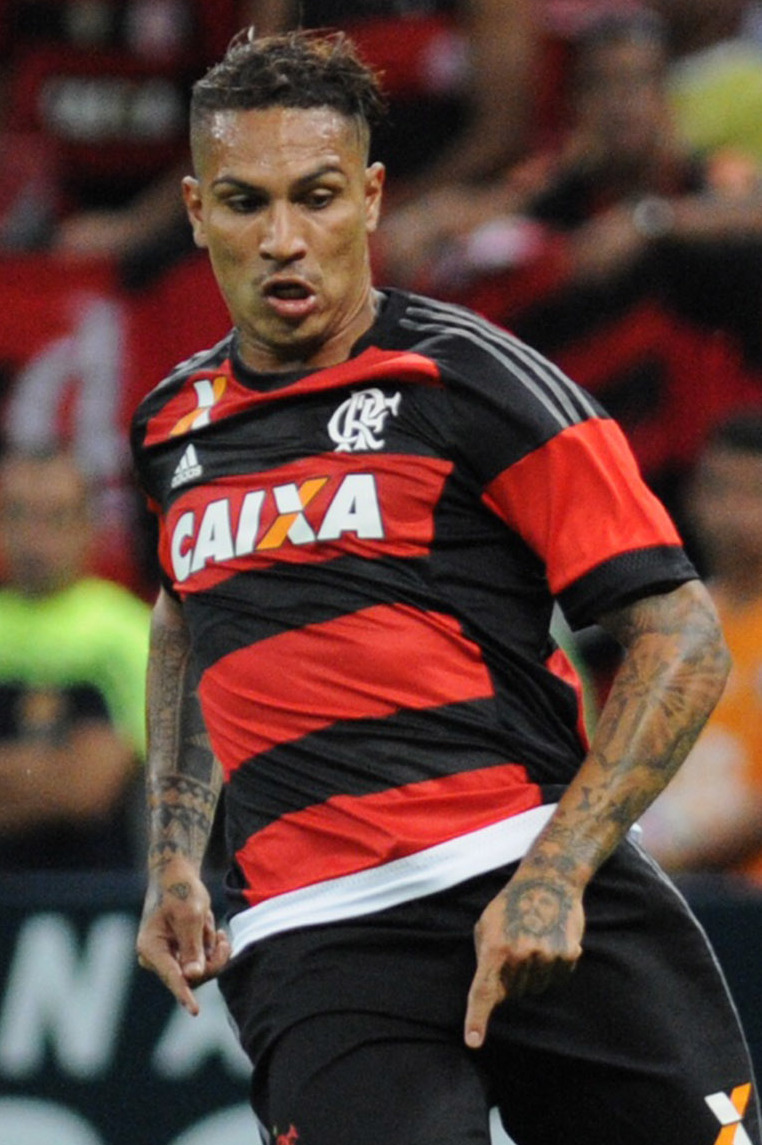
Paolo Guerrero

Positions
GK	Goalkeeper	DF	Defender	MF	Midfielder	FW	Forward

=== Table of notable players with 100–199 appearances for Flamengo ===
Statistics correct as of match played 19 July 2026.

Name	Nationality	Position	Flamengo career	Club apps.	Goals	Ref.
Gallo^{†}	Brazil	MF	1912–1919	142	13	
Sidney Pullen^{†}	England	FW	1915–1925	130	47	
Japonez^{†}	Brazil	FW	1916–1927	154	14	
Dino^{†}	Brazil	MF	1918–1924	111	5	
Junqueira^{†}	Brazil	FW	1919–1925	101	82	
Anníbal Candiota^{†}	Brazil	FW	1919–1927	115	50	
Benevenuto^{†}	Brazil	MF	1923–1930	120	15	
Moderato^{†}	Brazil	FW	1923–1930	150	25	
Amado Benigno^{†}	Brazil	GK	1923–1934	123	0	
Hélcio^{†}	Brazil	DF	1924–1931	140	6	
Flávio Costa^{†}	Brazil	MF	1926–1936	147	16	
Rubens Leite^{†}	Brazil	MF	1926–1934	125	5	
Nelson^{†}	Brazil	FW	1931–1936	149	90	
Carlos Alves^{†}	Portugal	DF	1933–1938	130	0	
Alfredinho^{†}	Brazil	FW	1934–1937	106	103	
Álvaro Barbosa^{†}	Brazil	MF	1934–1939	124	2	
Marin^{†}	Brazil	DF	1934–1941	140	1	
Leônidas da Silva^{†}	Brazil	FW	1936–1941	148	147	
Jocelino^{†}	Brazil	MF	1936–1942	107	0	
Mamede da Guia^{†}	Brazil	MF	1936–1942	169	3	
Agustín Valido^{†}	Argentina	FW	1937–1944	143	45	
Carlos Volante^{†}	Argentina	MF	1938–1943	164	4	
Artigas^{†}	Brazil	MF	1939–1944	129	2	
Jurandir^{†}	Brazil	GK	1942–1946	106	0	
Tião^{†}	Brazil	FW	1943–1947	153	58	
Luiz Borracha^{†}	Brazil	GK	1943–1949	155	0	
Gringo^{†}	Brazil	MF	1947–1952	121	66	
Beto^{†}	Brazil	MF	1948–1953	122	9	
Durval^{†}	Brazil	FW	1948–1951	132	127	
Adãozinho^{†}	Brazil	FW	1951–1953	103	47	
Rubens^{†}	Brazil	MF	1951–1957	171	83	
Jorge Benitez^{†}	Paraguay	FW	1952–1956	114	76	
Servílio^{†}	Brazil	DF	1953–1956	106	2	
Milton Copolillo^{†}	Brazil	MF	1953–1960	183	6	
Evaristo de Macedo^{†}	Brazil	FW	1953–1966	190	104	
Duca^{†}	Brazil	FW	1954–1958	119	42	
Bolero^{†}	Brazil	DF	1957–1964	161	0	
Fernando^{†}	Brazil	GK	1957–1963	170	0	
Luís Carlos da Silva^{†}	Brazil	FW	1957–1961	195	77	
Gérson^{†}	Brazil	MF	1958–1963	151	83	
Carlos Alberto^{†}	Brazil	FW	1958–1970	119	15	
José Ufarte^{†}	Spain	FW	1958–1961; 1962–1964	106	15	
Mauro^{†}	Brazil	GK	1959–1963	118	0	
Ari^{†}	Brazil	GK	1959–1962	116	0	
Aírton Beleza^{†}	Brazil	FW	1961–1967	132	71	
Luís Carlos de Freitas^{†}	Brazil	DF	1962–1967	145	0	
Paulo Choco^{†}	Brazil	FW	1963–1968	142	42	
Ditão^{†}	Brazil	DF	1964–1968	184	2	
Jayme Valente^{†}	Brazil	DF	1964–1969	164	0	
Marco Aurélio^{†}	Brazil	GK	1964–1971	144	0	
Dionísio^{†}	Brazil	FW	1967–1972	163	61	
Francisco Reyes^{†}	Paraguay	DF	1967–1973	196	7	
Caio Cambalhota^{†}	Brazil	FW	1970–1971; 1972–1973; 1975; 1990	137	47	
Fred^{†}	Brazil	DF	1970–1974; 1975	108	0	
Moreira^{†}	Brazil	DF	1972–1973	109	1	
Chiquinho Pastor^{†}	Brazil	DF	1972–1974	112	0	
Geraldo Assoviador^{†}	Brazil	MF	1973–1976	169	13	
Jayme de Almeida^{†}	Brazil	DF	1973–1977	198	3	
Luís Carlos Galter^{†}	Brazil	DF	1974–1975	119	0	
Merica^{†}	Brazil	MF	1975–1978	182	9	
Dequinha^{†}	Brazil	DF	1975–1979	142	1	
Luisinho Tombo^{†}	Brazil	FW	1975–1977	160	94	
Júlio César Uri Geller^{†}	Brazil	FW	1975–1981	132	10	
Cláudio Adão^{†}	Brazil	FW	1977–1980; 1983	154	82	
Manguito^{†}	Brazil	DF	1978–1990	116	1	
Figueiredo^{†}	Brazil	DF	1979–1984	153	0	
Carlos Alberto^{†}	Brazil	DF	1980–1983	102	1	
Lico^{†}	Brazil	FW	1980–1984	119	17	
Julio César Barbosa^{†}	Brazil	FW	1981–1988	149	15	
Gaúcho^{†}	Brazil	FW	1982–1984; 1990–1993	199	98	
Adalberto Machado^{†}	Brazil	DF	1983–1989	185	7	
Gilmar Popoca^{†}	Brazil	MF	1983–1987	109	30	
Guto^{†}	Brazil	FF	1983–1988	127	1	
Marquinho^{†}	Brazil	FW	1985–1987	115	14	
Aldair^{†}	Brazil	DF	1985–1989	184	12	
Leonardo^{†}	Brazil	MF	1987–1990; 2002	177	10	
Luís Antônio^{†}	Brazil	FW	1988–1993	109	22	
Djalminha^{†}	Brazil	MF	1989–1993	133	29	
Gelson Baresi^{†}	Brazil	DF	1992–1995	117	3	
Marcos Adriano^{†}	Brazil	DF	1993–1995	100	4	
Luiz Alberto^{†}	Brazil	DF	1993–2000	166	5	
Leonardo Inácio^{†}	Brazil	MF	1993–2000	104	5	
Márcio Costa^{†}	Brazil	MF	1995–1997	104	1	
Gilberto^{†}	Brazil	DF	1996–1997	117	4	
Alessandro^{†}	Brazil	DF	1997–2002; 2003	130	6	
Lúcio^{†}	Brazil	FW	1997–2000	117	23	
Beto^{†}	Brazil	MF	1998–2002	177	32	
Leandro Ávila^{†}	Brazil	MF	1998–2002	156	0	
Leandro Machado^{†}	Brazil	FW	1999–2002	102	39	
Edílson^{†}	Brazil	FW	2000–2003	117	51	
André Bahia^{†}	Brazil	DF	2001–2004	123	5	
Andrezinho^{†}	Brazil	FW	2001–2004	108	14	
Dejan Petković^{†}	Serbia	MF	2001–2002; 2009–2011	198	57	
Jônatas	Brazil	MF	2002–2009	197	13	
Jean^{†}	Brazil	FW	2002–2004; 2005	148	32	
Diego Menezes^{†}	Brazil	GK	2002–2009	172	0	
Obina^{†}	Brazil	FW	2005–2009; 2010	174	46	
Toró^{†}	Brazil	MF	2006–2010	163	6	
Paulo Victor	Brazil	GK	2007–2017	158	0	
Kléberson	Brazil	MF	2008–2012	132	22	
Airton	Brazil	MF	2008–2009; 2011–2012	110	1	
Welinton	Brazil	DF	2009–2014	146	5	
Willians	Brazil	MF	2009–2012	176	5	
David Braz	Brazil	DF	2009–2012	103	5	
Felipe	Brazil	GK	2011–2014	182	0	
Luiz Antônio	Brazil	MF	2011–2015	168	8	
Paulinho	Brazil	FW	2013–2015	106	16	
Wallace Reis	Brazil	DF	2013–2016	167	7	
Paolo Guerrero	Peru	FW	2015–2018	113	43	
Réver	Brazil	DF	2016–2018	133	11	
Gustavo Cuéllar	Colombia	MF	2016–2019	167	2	
**Lucas Paquetá**	Brazil	MF	2016–2018; 2026–	119	26	
Rodrigo Caio	Brazil	DF	2019–2023	149	5	
Filipe Luís	Brazil	DF	2019–2023	175	4	
Matheuzinho	Brazil	DF	2019–2024	152	4	
Thiago Maia	Brazil	MF	2020–2024	156	5	
Michael	Brazil	FW	2020–2021; 2024–2026	150	29	
João Gomes	Brazil	MF	2020–2022	122	4	
Wesley França	Brazil	DF	2021–2025	135	4	
David Luiz	Brazil	DF	2021–2024	109	4	
Fabrício Bruno	Brazil	DF	2022–2024	148	6	
Victor Hugo	Brazil	MF	2022–2025	106	6	
**Everton Soares**	Brazil	FW	2022–	189	20	
**Guillermo Varela**	Uruguay	DF	2022–	145	4	
**Erick Pulgar**	Chile	MF	2022–	156	5	
**Agustín Rossi**	Argentina	GK	2023–	173	0	
**Luiz Araújo**	Brazil	FW	2023–	171	27	
**Léo Ortiz**	Brazil	DF	2024–	118	7	

=== Table of notable players with 200–299 appearances for Flamengo ===
Statistics correct as of match played 19 July 2026.

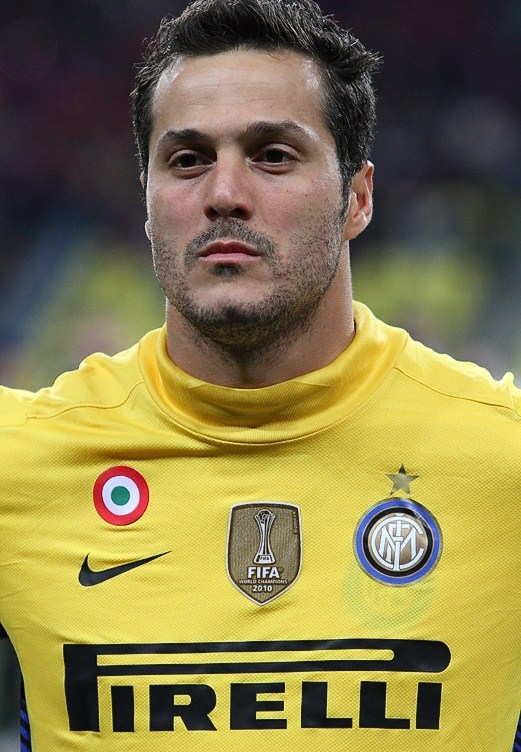
Júlio César, 287 appearances.

Name	Nationality	Position	Flamengo career	Club apps.	Goals	Ref.
Domingos da Guia^{†}	Brazil	DF	1936–1943	227	0	
Esquerdinha^{†}	Brazil	FW	1948–1955	279	108	
Índio^{†}	Brazil	FW	1949–1957	219	144	
Sinforiano Garcia^{†}	Paraguay	GK	1949–1958	276	0	
Moacir^{†}	Brazil	FW	1956–1961	226	56	
Fio Maravilha^{†}	Brazil	FW	1965–1973	294	84	
Arilson^{†}	Brazil	FW	1967–1974	223	36	
Horácio Doval^{†}	Argentina	FW	1969–1976	263	92	
Luiz Paulo^{†}	Brazil	FW	1975–1978	207	21	
Paulo César Carpegiani^{†}	Brazil	DF	1977–1982	223	12	
Raul Plassmann^{†}	Brazil	GK	1978–1983	228	0	
Carlos Mozer^{†}	Brazil	DF	1980–1987	292	21	
Marinho^{†}	Brazil	DF	1980–1984; 1990	220	6	
Jorginho^{†}	Brazil	DF	1984–1989	247	8	
Alcindo Sartori^{†}	Brazil	FW	1986–1991	213	32	
Marcelinho Carioca^{†}	Brazil	FW	1988–1993	242	49	
Piá^{†}	Brazil	DF	1989–1993	221	6	
Fabinho^{†}	Brazil	MF	1990–1995	254	9	
Gilmar Rinaldi^{†}	Brazil	GK	1991–1994	239	0	
Charles Guerreiro^{†}	Brazil	DF	1991–1995	254	2	
Sávio^{†}	Brazil	FW	1992–1997; 2006	261	99	
Fabiano^{†}	Brazil	DF	1993–2005	228	5	
Athirson^{†}	Brazil	DF	1996–2000; 2002–2004	253	37	
Iranildo^{†}	Brazil	MF	1996–2000; 2002–2003	282	34	
Maurinho^{†}	Brazil	DF	1997–2002	209	10	
Clemer^{†}	Brazil	GK	1997–2002	232	0	
Júlio César^{†}	Brazil	GK	1997–2004; 2018	287	0	
Jorginho^{†}	Brazil	MF	1997–2003	242	4	
Fernando Santos^{†}	Brazil	DF	2000–2003; 2005–2006	216	6	
Ibson^{†}	Brazil	MF	2003–2005; 2007–2009; 2012–2013	233	35	
Renato Abreu^{†}	Brazil	MF	2005–2007; 2010–2013	250	68	
Ronaldo Angelim	Brazil	DF	2006–2011	276	16	
Bruno Fernandes^{†}	Brazil	GK	2006–2010	234	4	
Juan Maldonado	Brazil	DF	2006–2010	250	31	
Everton Cardoso	Brazil	MF	2008–2009; 2014–2018	255	38	
Gabriel Pinto	Brazil	FW	2013–2017	204	22	
Márcio Araújo	Brazil	MF	2014–2017	206	3	
Pará	Brazil	DF	2015–2019	205	4	
Rodinei	Brazil	DF	2016–2022	222	9	
Diego Ribas	Brazil	MF	2016–2022	283	42	
Renê	Brazil	DF	2017–2022	204	5	
Diego Alves	Brazil	GK	2017–2022	216	0	
Vitinho	Brazil	FW	2018–2022	213	29	
Gerson	Brazil	MF	2019–2021; 2023–2025	253	19	
**Ayrton Lucas**	Brazil	DF	2022–	223	16	

=== Table of notable players with 300–399 appearances for Flamengo ===
Statistics correct as of match played 19 July 2026.

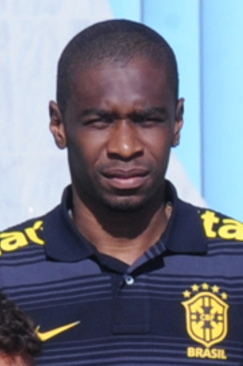
Juan, started his career and retired for Flamengo with a total of 332 appearances.

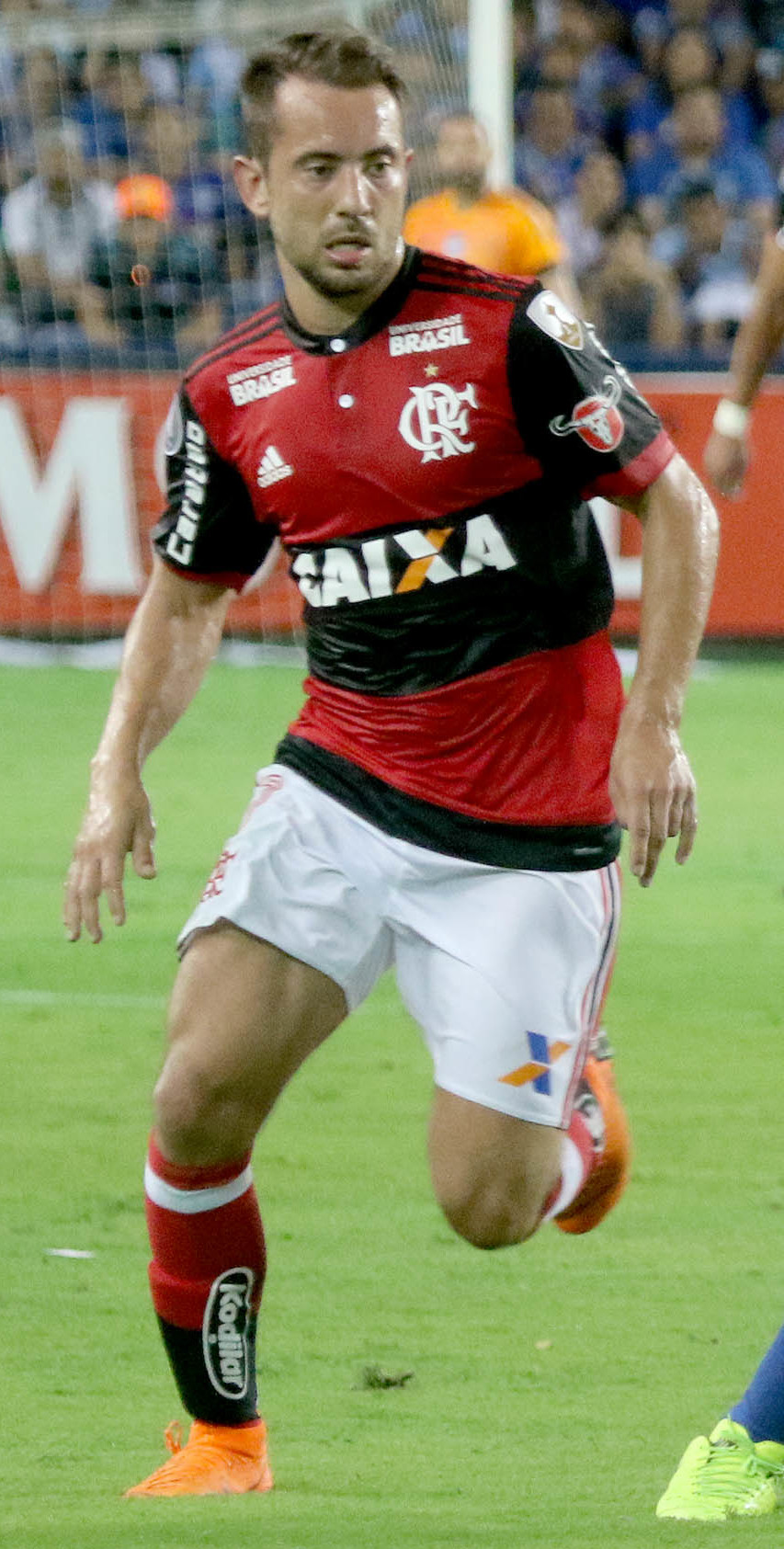
Éverton Ribeiro, 391 appearances.

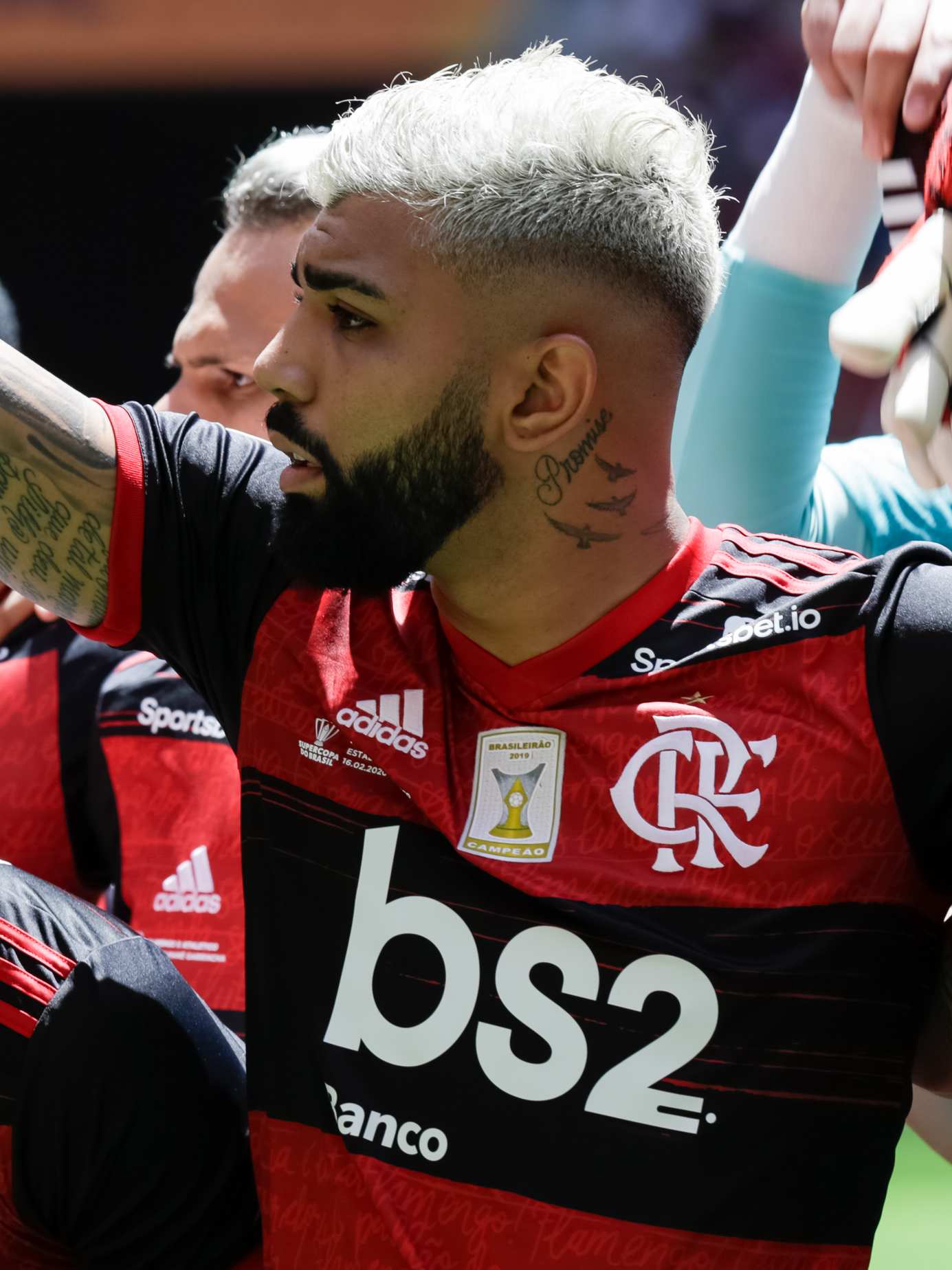
Gabriel Barbosa, 306 appearances.

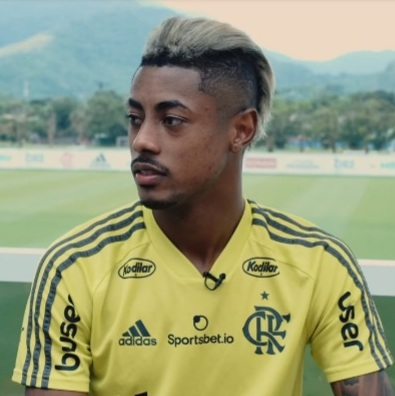
Bruno Henrique, 364 appearances.

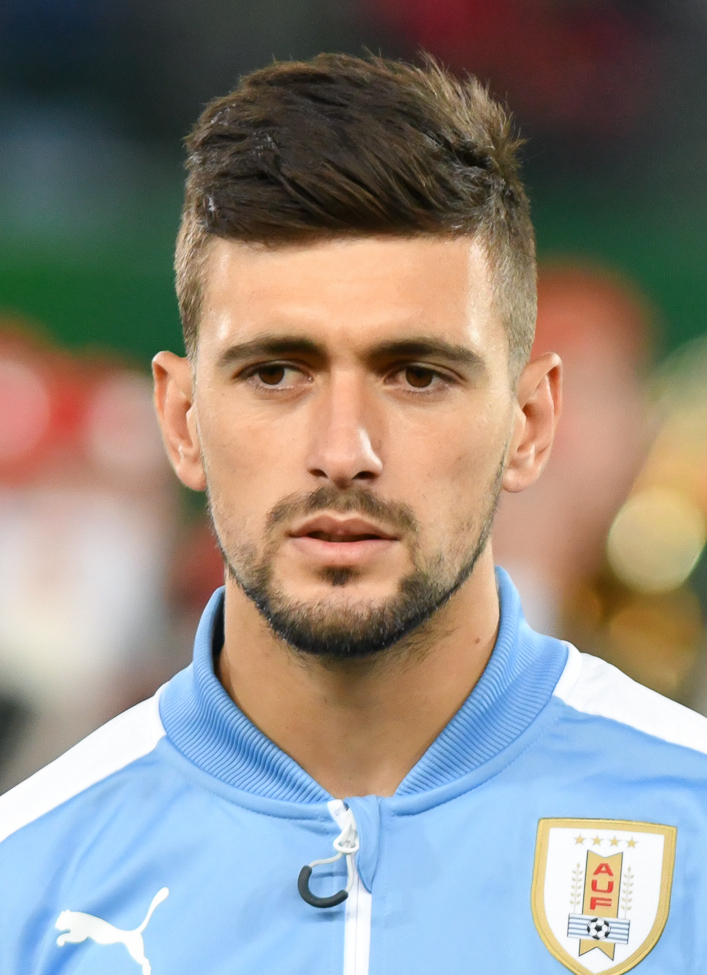
Giorgian de Arrascaeta, 372 appearances.

Name	Nationality	Position	Flamengo career	Club apps.	Goals	Ref.
Jarbas^{†}	Brazil	FW	1933–1946	377	152	
Jaime de Almeida^{†}	Brazil	MF	1938–1950	316	25	
Zizinho^{†}	Brazil	MF	1939–1950	328	142	
Newton Canegal^{†}	Brazil	DF	1939–1952	389	1	
Biguá^{†}	Brazil	MF	1941–1953	390	7	
Modesto Bria^{†}	Paraguay	MF	1943–1953	369	8	
Dequinha^{†}	Brazil	MF	1950–1959	384	8	
Babá^{†}	Brazil	FW	1954–1962	308	92	
Joubert^{†}	Brazil	DF	1955–1967	369	0	
Tita^{†}	Brazil	FW	1977–1982; 1983–1985	391	135	
Bebeto^{†}	Brazil	FW	1983–1989; 1996	307	150	
Zé Carlos^{†}	Brazil	GK	1985–1991; 1996–1997	354	0	
Aílton Ferraz^{†}	Brazil	MF	1985–1991	384	28	
Marquinhos^{†}	Brazil	MF	1988–1995	337	28	
Júnior Baiano^{†}	Brazil	DF	1988–1993; 1996–1998; 2004–2005	337	33	
Fabio Baiano^{†}	Brazil	MF	1992–1996; 1998–2000; 2003–2004	327	41	
Juan Santos^{†}	Brazil	DF	1996–2002; 2016–2019	332	32	
Willian Arão	Brazil	MF	2016–2022	371	34	
Éverton Ribeiro	Brazil	MF	2017–2023	391	45	
Gabriel Barbosa	Brazil	FW	2019–2024	306	161	
**Bruno Henrique**	Brazil	FW	2019–	367	116	
**Giorgian de Arrascaeta**	Uruguay	MF	2019–	374	105	
**Léo Pereira**	Brazil	DF	2020–	304	19	
**Pedro**	Brazil	FW	2020–	335	169	

=== Table of notable players with 400–499 appearances for Flamengo ===
Statistics correct as of match played 19 July 2026.

Name	Nationality	Position	Flamengo career	Club apps.	Goals	Ref.
Joel^{†}	Brazil	FW	1951–1958; 1961–1963	414	115	
Jadir^{†}	Brazil	MF	1952–1962	498	7	
Henrique Frade^{†}	Brazil	FW	1954–1963	411	213	
Paulo Henrique^{†}	Brazil	DF	1960–1972	437	14	
Murilo^{†}	Brazil	DF	1963–1971	448	3	
Rondinelli^{†}	Brazil	DF	1973–1981	406	12	
Leandro^{†}	Brazil	DF	1978–1990	414	14	
Zinho^{†}	Brazil	MF	1986–1992; 2004–2005	466	65	

=== Table of notable players with 500+ appearances for Flamengo ===
Statistics correct as of match played 19 July 2026.

Name	Nationality	Position	Flamengo career	Club apps.	Goals	Ref.
Jordan^{†}	Brazil	DF	1952–1963	609	3	
Carlinhos^{†}	Brazil	MF	1958–1969	517	23	
Liminha^{†}	Brazil	MF	1968–1975	513	29	
Zico^{†}	Brazil	FW	1971–1983; 1985–1990	732	509	
Cantarele^{†}	Brazil	GK	1973–1983; 1984–1989	557	0	
Júnior^{†}	Brazil	DF	1974–1984; 1989–1993	876	76	
Adílio^{†}	Brazil	MF	1975–1987	616	128	
Andrade^{†}	Brazil	MF	1977–1988	569	28	
Leonardo Moura	Brazil	DF	2005–2014	502	44	

== Club captains ==
List of Flamengo club captains
Dates	Captain	Vice-captain	Notes
2016–2017	(Brazil) Réver	(Brazil) Diego Ribas	
2018–2022	(Brazil) Diego Ribas	(Brazil) Éverton Ribeiro	
2023	(Brazil) Éverton Ribeiro	(Brazil) Gabriel Barbosa	
2024–2025	(Brazil) Gerson	(Brazil) Bruno Henrique	
2025–	(Brazil) Bruno Henrique	(Uruguay) Giorgian de Arrascaeta	
