= Rogério Hetmanek =

Brazilian footballer (born 1948)

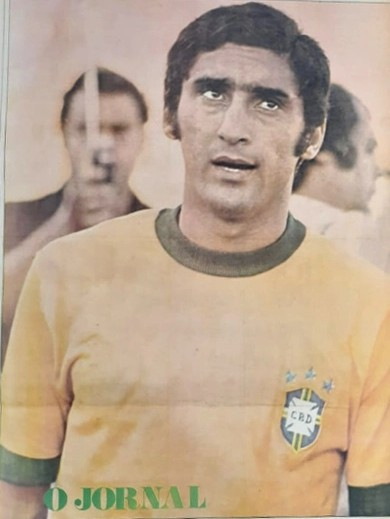
- Rogério Hetmanek in 1970

Personal information
- Full name: Rogério Hetmanek
- Date of birth: 2 August 1948 (age 78)
- Place of birth: Rio de Janeiro, Federal District, Brazil
- Position: Right winger

Youth career
- 1963–1966: Botafogo

Senior career*
Years	Team	Apps	(Gls)
1966–1970	Botafogo		
1971	Santos	123	(0)
1972–1974	Flamengo		
1974–1976	Botafogo		

International career
1970–1972	Brazil	2	(0)
- * Club domestic league appearances and goals

Rogério Hetmanek (born 2 August 1948) is a retired Brazilian footballer and Messanic reverend. He played as a right winger for Botafogo and Flamengo throughout the 1970s. He would also briefly represent his home country of Brazil from 1968 to 1972 including his participation in the Brazil Independence Cup as well as a technical observer in the 1970 FIFA World Cup due to his series of medical problems around the prime of his career.

== Club career ==
Rogério would begin his career by playing for the youth sector of Botafogo beginning in 1963. He would find success around this time, being part of the winning squads for the 1963 Youth Home Tournament, the 1964 and the 1966 Rio de Janeiro Youth Championship. He would be promoted to the senior squad following the departure of Garrincha from the club in 1966 as a right winger. Soon after, he would win the 1966 Taça Guanabara, the 1967 and the 1968 Campeonato Carioca and the 1968 Taça Brasil. For the 1971 Campeonato Brasileiro Série A, Rogério would be transferred to play for Santos as a part the club receiving Carlos Alberto in a loan alongside Fernando Ferretti and Moreira. Following the general lack of success with the club, he would play for Flamengo for the 1972 Campeonato Brasileiro Série A as part of a transfer deal between club managers Mário Zagallo and Admildo Chirol in which Moreira, Roberto Miranda and Paulo Cézar Caju would join him in the club. Despite playing as a reserve, Portuguese businessman Fernando Cardoso was interested in Rogério playing for Sporting CP alongside interest from Argentinian club Racing Club de Avellaneda prior to learning that the former was a con artist.

His first season with Flamengo would see him win the 1972 Campeonato Carioca and by the time of the end of his tenure for the club, he would make 117 appearances along with 7 goals being scored. During the second half of the 1974 Campeonato Brasileiro Série A, Rogério returned to play for Botafogo as he would make a combined 197 appearances with 27 goals before his retirement in 1976.

== International career ==
Following his successes during the late 1960s, Rogério would catch the interest of the Brazilian Football Confederation to play for Brazil. However, he would only officially play in three friendlies in 1970 with a 0–0 draw against Paraguay, a 1–0 victory against Austria and a 1–5 victory against Chile. The reasoning for his relative lack of participation was due to a foot infection that Rogério had managed to acquire that year. Manager João Saldanha had told him that he would wait for his recovery for the upcoming 1970 FIFA World Cup with Mário Zagallo giving him the same amount of support. However, following the friendly with Austria, he would experience persistent muscle fragility and despite travelling with the rest of the team to Guadalajara, his condition wouldn't recover and was becoming ever clearer that he couldn't meet the expectations of the ever-increasing difficult training regiments that the Brazilian players underwent. It later became apparent that his condition was chronic and when deciding on the final 22-man squad to represent Brazil at the tournament, he chose to resign on his own volition. However, rather than immediately head home, captain Carlos Alberto would convince Rogério to stay alongside him as a part of the coaching staff as a technical observer of Brazil's opponents. This would be the case throughout the tournament with special attention during the knockout phase with Rogério carefully eyeing and taking notes on strong teams such as Peru, Uruguay, West Germany and Italy. His contributions within the tournament would be recognized following Brazil winning the tournament and Rogério being bestowed the honorary title of the "23rd player" of Brazil.

Following his participation in the 1970 FIFA World Cup, he would be called up to play for the Brazil Independence Cup two years later but despite appearing on the roster, he would continue to struggle with regaining his old and ideal form with this being the final opportunity for his international career.

== Personal life ==
Due to his persistent injuries throughout the early 1970s, he would seek out a renowned hematologist where he would then begin to take prescription drugs. A few weeks later however, his leukocyte rate would drop significantly which resulted in an indefinite intake of harsher prescriptive drugs. He also decided to take pesticide-free natural medicine as well as take jōrei from his local Messianic Church where he would also be familiar with the works of Mokichi Okada. This would affect his career as following his retirement, Botafogo president Charles Borer attempted to convince Rogério to play as a manager for various smaller clubs but he was ultimately uninterested as he had begun getting interested in Messianic philosophy. He currently serves as a reverend for the Messianic Church with a degree in philosophy in Paraná as well as a master's degree in São Paulo as well as president of the Mokiti Okada Foundation since 2007. He currently has four children and five grandchildren.
