= Jadir (footballer) =

Brazilian footballer

Personal information
- Full name: Jadyr Egídio de Souza
- Date of birth: 9 April 1930
- Place of birth: Rio de Janeiro, Brazil
- Date of death: 13 August 1977 (aged 47)
- Place of death: São Paulo, Brazil
- Position: Defender

Youth career
- Flamengo

Senior career*
Years	Team	Apps	(Gls)
1952–1961	Flamengo	472	(5)
1962	Cruzeiro	1	(0)
1962–1963	Botafogo		
1963	Mallorca		

International career
1957–1961	Brazil	6	(0)
- * Club domestic league appearances and goals

Jadyr Egídio de Souza (9 April 1930 – 13 August 1977), known as Jadir or Jadyr, was a Brazilian professional footballer who played as a defender. He played most of his career at Flamengo, where he is one of the most capped players in the club's history.

== Career ==
Jadir is bet known for his time spent at Flamengo, playing alongside Dequinha and Jordan in the defense that captured three consecutive Campeonato Carioca titles - 1953-54-55. In total he played in 472 games for Flamengo (270 wins, 91 draws, 101 losses) and scored five goals. Jadir has the 9th most appearances by a player in Flamengo history.

In 1962 after leaving Flamengo, he appeared in a single game for Cruzeiro and later moved to Botafogo, winning the Campeonato Carioca again that year. Some sources indicate he played briefly for Spain's Mallorca before retiring.

For the Brazil National Team, Jadir appeared in six matches (two against Portugal, two against Argentina, one against Bulgaria and one against Paraguay) earning five wins and one defeat.

== Titles ==
Flamengo

- Torneio Início do Campeonato Carioca: 1952
- Campeonato Carioca: 1953, 1954, 1955
- Torneio Rio-São Paulo: 1961
- Torneio Octogonal de Verão do Uruguai: 1961
- Troféu Magalhães Pinto: 1961

Botafogo

- Campeonato Carioca: 1962

== See also ==
- List of Clube de Regatas do Flamengo players
