= Servílio (footballer, born 1929) =

Brazilian footballer

Personal information
- Full name: José Lucas Servílio
- Date of birth: 25 September 1929
- Place of birth: Vargem Grande Paulista, Brazil
- Date of death: 30 March 2001 (aged 71)
- Place of death: Campinas, Brazil
- Position: Defender

Youth career
- Mogiana

Senior career*
Years	Team	Apps	(Gls)
1947–1950	Ponte Preta		
1951–1953	XV de Jaú		
1953–1956	Flamengo	106	(2)
1957–1958	Botafogo		
1959	Santa Cruz		
1960	São Paulo	13	(0)

International career
1959	Brazil	1	(0)
- * Club domestic league appearances and goals as of 23 March 2024

José Lucas Servílio (25 September 1929 – 30 March 2001), simply known as Servílio, was a Brazilian professional footballer who played as a defender.

== Career ==
An excellent header, he stood out for his superiority in the aerial game. He played for Flamengo in the 1950s, playing on the defensive line with Dequinha and Jordan, where he achieved great success. He was also champion in 1957 with Botafogo, played for Santa Cruz in 1959 and ended his career in 1960 with São Paulo FC.

== International career ==
Servilio was called up for the 1959 South American Championship held in Ecuador, alongside other athletes who were playing in Pernambuco at the time. He only played in one match, against Ecuador.

== Honours ==
XV de Jaú

- Campeonato Paulista Série A2: 1951

Flamengo

- Campeonato Carioca: 1953, 1954, 1955

Botafogo

- Campeonato Carioca: 1957
