= Chiquinho Pastor =

Brazilian footballer (1946–2010)

Personal information
- Full name: Francisco de Jesus Fernandes
- Date of birth: 21 August 1946
- Place of birth: Juiz de Fora, Brazil
- Date of death: 14 April 2010 (aged 63)
- Place of death: São Paulo, Brazil
- Position: Centre-back

Senior career*
Years	Team	Apps	(Gls)
1964–1971	Botafogo		
1971–1974	Flamengo	112	(0)
1974	Grêmio	27	(0)
1975	Botafogo		

International career
1973	Brazil	2	(0)
- * Club domestic league appearances and goals

Francisco de Jesus Fernandes (21 August 1946 – 14 April 2010), better known as Chiquinho Pastor, was a Brazilian professional footballer who played as a centre-back.

== Career ==
Chiquinho Pastor played most of his career at Botafogo, being part of the team's squad in the 1960s, being twice state champion and the Taça Brasil champion in 1968. He also played for Flamengo, where he made 112 appearances and won two more titles, and for Grêmio in 1974, playing 27 matches. He returned to Botafogo in 1975 where he retired.

He played in 1973 for two matches for the Brazil national team, against Algeria and Bolivia.

== Personal life and death ==
Chiquinho is brother of fellow footballer Cafuringa. He received the nickname "Pastor" because he was a reverend of the World Messianic Church of Brazil (IMMB).

Chiquinho Pastor died in São Paulo, 14 April 2010, as a result of a generalized infection.

== Honours ==
Botafogo

- Campeonato Carioca: 1967, 1968
- Taça Guanabara: 1968
- Taça Brasil: 1968

Flamengo

- Campeonato Carioca: 1972, 1974
- Taça Guanabara: 1972, 1973
