= Gringo (disambiguation) =

Gringo is a term used to describe a foreigner from the perspective of Spanish and Portuguese-speaking countries in Latin America.

Gringo may also refer to:

== Music ==
- Gringo Records, an independent label based in Nottingham, England
- Gringo (album), a 2009 album by the Circus Devils
- "Gringo" (Sabrina song), 1989
- "Gringo" (Shatta Wale song), 2018
- Gringo, a 1987 album by Gregg Rolie
- "Gringo", a 2006 song by Akon from Konvicted
- "Gringo", a song by Roby Benvenuto
- "Gringo", a song by Little Feat from Hoy-Hoy!

== Fiction ==
- Gringo (play), a 1922 play by Sophie Treadwell
- Gringo (manga), a 1987 manga
- Gringos (novel), a 1991 novel by Charles Portis
- El Gringo, a western novel about Morgan Kane
- Gunfight at Red Sands or Gringo, a 1963 Italian/Spanish spaghetti western
- El Gringo, a 2012 American action thriller film
- Gringo (2018 film), an American crime comedy film
- Los gringos, an animated short, an official selection for the 2000 Sundance Film Festival
- "The Gringos", an episode of The O.C.

== Places ==
- Gringo (restaurant), a Filipino restaurant chain
- Gringo, Pennsylvania, an unincorporated community
- Gringo Gulch, a valley in Arizona

== Nickname and stage name ==
- José Antonio Castro (born 1980), Mexican footballer
- Gabriel Heinze (born 1978), Argentine former footballer
- Gregorio Honasan (born 1948), Filipino politician
- Mr Percival (born 1976), Australian pelican and film actor
- Juan Schiaretti (born 1949), Argentine politician
- John Spacely (died 1993), American actor and hustler
- Miguel "El Gringo" Villarreal (died 2013), alleged drug trafficker and a leader of the Gulf Cartel Mexican drug trafficking organization
- Gringo (footballer), Orisvaldo dos Santos (1926–2003), Brazilian footballer
- Gringo (musician), Samuel Gerena, member of the reggaeton duo Baby Rasta & Gringo
- El Gringo (musician), Shawn Kiehne (born 1976), an American Latin musician

== Other uses ==
- Marseille turn or Gringo, a football skill
- Gringo: The Dangerous Life of John McAfee, a documentary about John McAfee
- Gringas, a Mexican dish
- Old Gringo Boots, an American footwear brand
