= Caio Cambalhota =

Brazilian footballer (born 1949)

Personal information
- Full name: José Carlos da Silva Lemos
- Date of birth: 11 September 1949 (age 77)
- Place of birth: Niterói, Brazil
- Height: 1.75 m (5 ft 9 in)
- Position: Forward

Youth career
- Botafogo

Senior career*
Years	Team	Apps	(Gls)
1967–1969	Botafogo		
1970–1976	Flamengo	136	(47)
1970	→ Ponte Preta (loan)		
1971	→ America-RJ (loan)		
1973	→ Tiradentes-PI (loan)		
1973–1974	→ America-RJ (loan)		
1977	Braga		
1977–1978	Atlético Mineiro		
1978	America Mineiro		
1979	Bahia		
1979	Campo Grande-RJ		
1980	Olaria		
1980	Bangu		
1980–1981	AA Votuporanguense		
1981	Campo Grande-RJ		
1981–1983	Amora		
1983–1984	União da Madeira		
1984–1986	Nacional da Madeira		
1987	Cova da Piedade		
1987	Caldense		
1987	Tupi		
1988	Rio Branco-MG		
1988	Tiradentes-DF		
1989	Tung Sing		
1989	Rio Branco-MG		
1990	Flamengo	1	(0)
1990–1991	Umm Salal		
- * Club domestic league appearances and goals as of 2 March 2024

José Carlos da Silva Lemos (born 11 September 1949), better known as Caio Cambalhota, is a Brazilian former professional footballer who played as a forward.

== Career ==
Football wanderer, Caio Cambalhota played for more than 20 different clubs during his career, participating in important titles such as the Taça Brasil champion squad for Botafogo, Taça FPF for SC Braga in addition to several state victories. He received the nickname "Cambalhota" (somersault) because of the way he celebrated his goals.

== Personal life ==
Caio Cambalhota is a brother of professional footballers César Maluco and Luisinho Lemos.

== Honours ==
Botafogo

- Taça Brasil: 1968
- Campeonato Carioca: 1967, 1968
- Taça Guanabara: 1967, 1968
- Torneio Internacional da Cidade do México: 1968

Flamengo

- Campeonato Carioca: 1972
- Taça Guanabara: 1970, 1972, 1973
- Torneio do Povo: 1972
- Torneio Internacional de Verão do Rio de Janeiro: 1973

America-RJ

- Taça Guanabara: 1974

Braga

- Taça Federação Portuguesa de Futebol: 1976–77

Atlético Mineiro

- Copa dos Campeões da Copa Brasil: 1978
- Campeonato Mineiro: 1978

Bahia

- Campeonato Baiano: 1979

Tiradentes

- Campeonato Brasiliense: 1988
