= Paulo Cézar Caju =

Brazilian footballer

Caju
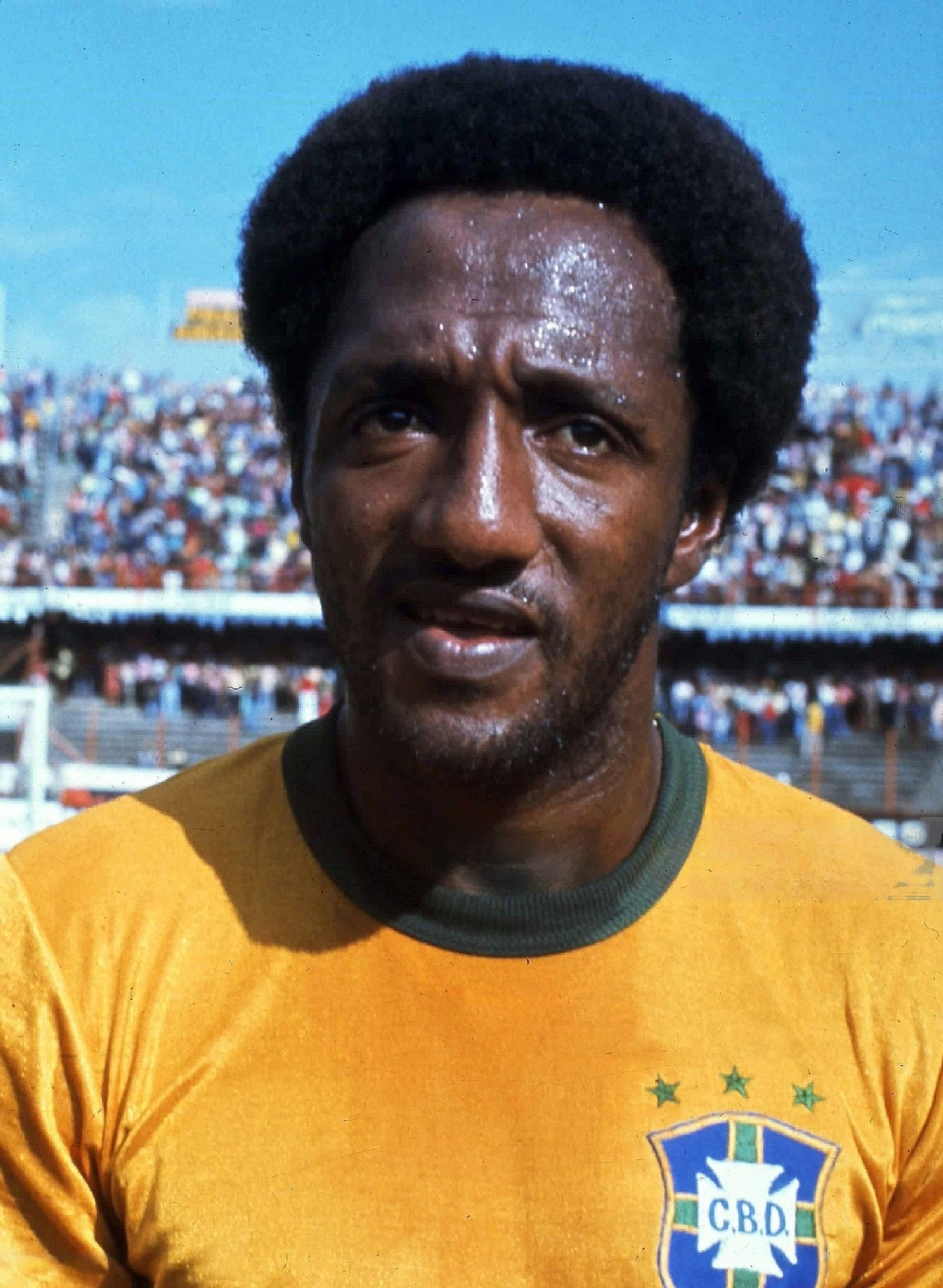
- Caju in 1978

Personal information
- Full name: Paulo Cézar Lima
- Date of birth: 16 June 1949 (age 77)
- Place of birth: Rio de Janeiro, Brazil
- Height: 1.74 m (5 ft 9 in)
- Position: Attacking midfielder

Senior career*
Years	Team	Apps	(Gls)
1966–1967	Junior de Barranquilla		
1967–1972	Botafogo	264	(83)
1972–1974	Flamengo	40	(6)
1974–1975	Marseille	31	(16)
1975–1977	Fluminense	39	(11)
1977–1978	Botafogo	28	(4)
1978–1979	Grêmio	5	(1)
1980	Vasco da Gama		
1981	Corinthians		
1981	California Surf	18	(4)
1982–1983	Aix	21	(3)
1983	Grêmio		

International career
1967–1977	Brazil	57	(10)
Medal record
Men's Football
Representing Brazil
FIFA World Cup
Winner	1970 Mexico
- * Club domestic league appearances and goals

Paulo Cézar Lima (born 16 June 1949), known as Caju, is a Brazilian former professional footballer who played as an attacking midfielder. During his career, he played for clubs in Brazil, including Botafogo, and for Marseille in France. At international level, he earned 57 caps by the Brazil national team in the 1960s and 1970s, scoring 10 goals.

== Career ==
Caju spent his early years in Honduras, where his father Marinho Rodrigues managed Club Deportivo Olimpia during the early 1960s. In the mid-1960s Marinho took over as manager in Colombian club Junior de Barranquilla, where Caju debuted as a professional, at age 16, playing alongside Brazilian internationals Dida and Escurinho.

In 1967 he moved to Botafogo de Futebol e Regatas, making his debut at age 17. He won the Campeonato Carioca (championship of the state of Rio de Janeiro) multiple times.

Caju was a member of the Brazil national team for the World Cup in 1970 and in 1974. With the Brazil national team he collected 57 caps and 10 goals.

Caju featured in the Brazilian Bola de Ouro team of the season in Brazil in the seasons 1970, 1972, 1976, 1977.

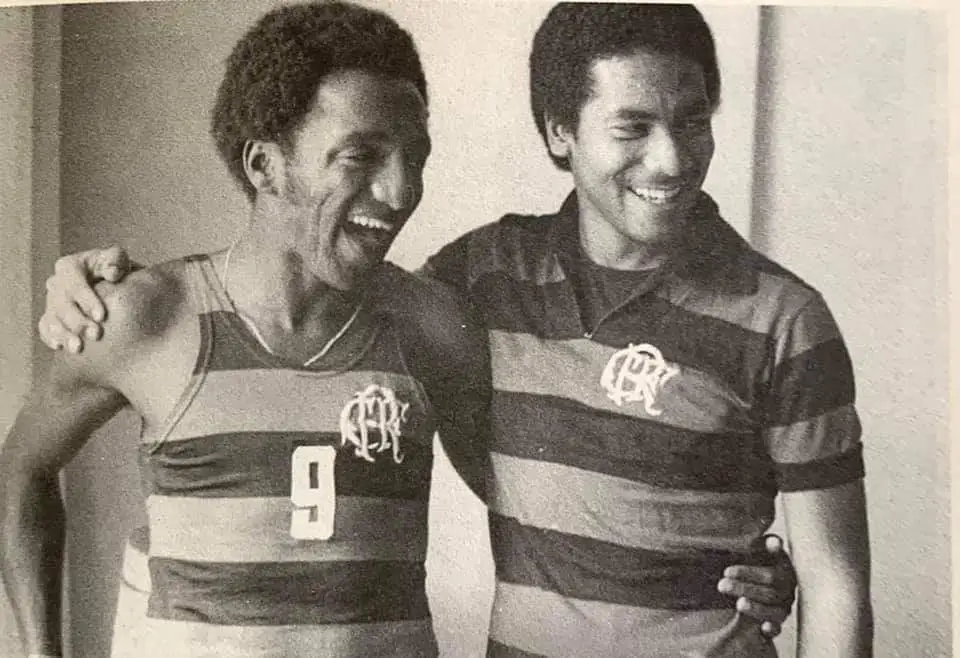
Caju (left) joined his brother Fred (right) at Flamengo in 1972

In the 1990s, Paulo César Lima was the subject of a documentary film by João Moreira Salles The documentary depicts his flamboyance on and off the field during his days as a football player, and the difficult adjustments he had to make afterwards, outside of the limelight, and surviving on his income as a landlord.

== Honours ==
Botafogo

- Campeonato Brasileiro Série A: 1968
- Campeonato Carioca: 1967 and 1968

Flamengo

- Campeonato Carioca: 1972 and 1974

Fluminense

- Campeonato Carioca: 1975 and 1976
- Tournoi de Paris: 1976
- Teresa Herrera Trophy: 1977

Grêmio

- Campeonato Gaúcho: 1979 and 1980
- Copa Intercontinental: 1983

Vasco da Gama

- Trofeo Colombino: 1980

Brazil

- FIFA World Cup: 1970
- Roca Cup: 1971
- Brazil Independence Cup: 1972

Individual

- Brazilian Bola de Prata (Placar): 1970, 1972, 1976, 1977
- Rio state league's top scorer: 1971
