= Newton Canegal =

Brazilian footballer (1917–2003)

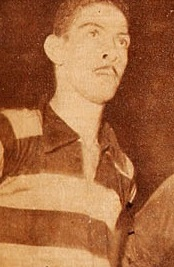
- Canegal in 1948

Personal information
- Date of birth: 4 June 1917
- Place of birth: Rio de Janeiro, Brazil
- Date of death: 23 March 2003 (aged 85)
- Place of death: Rio de Janeiro, Brazil
- Height: 1.85 m (6 ft 1 in)
- Position: Centre-back

Senior career*
Years	Team	Apps	(Gls)
1936–1938	Portuguesa (RJ)	?	(?)
1938–1939	Bonsucesso	?	(?)
1939–1952	Flamengo	389	(1)

International career
1945–1948	Brazil	7	(0)
- * Club domestic league appearances and goals

Newton Canegal (4 June 1917 – 23 March 2003), was a Brazilian professional footballer who played as a centre-back.

== Club career ==
Newton Canegal began his football career with Portuguesa of Rio de Janeiro in 1936 and played there until 1938. In 1938 he switched to local rival Bonsucesso, with which he played for a year.

In 1939 he moved to Flamengo, where he played until the end of his career until 1952. With Flamengo he won the Rio de Janeiro championship four times - 1939, 1942, 1943 and 1944.

== International career ==
For the Brazil national team, Canegal played in the 1945 and 1946 Copa America (runner-up in both). In 1945 he won the Copa Roca (now called Superderby the Americas) with Brazil.

In the Brazil national team, Newton Canegal made his debut for the Brazil national team on 14 February 1945 against Argentina in the 1945 Copa América, which Brazil finished runners-up. At this tournament, Newton appeared in two matches - against Argentina and Ecuador. In the same year he won the Copa Roca against Argentina.

In 1946 he participated for the second time in the Copa América tournament, where Brazil finished second, again. He last appeared for the national team on 4 April 1948 in a match against the Uruguay national team. In total, from years 1945–1948 Newton appeared in seven matches for Brazil.

== Death ==
Newton Canegal suffered from Parkinson's disease and died of heart failure on 23 March 2003 at the age of 85.

== Titles ==
Flamengo

- Campeonato Carioca: 1939, 1942, 1943, 1944

=== Other achievements ===
Flamengo

- Torneio Relâmpago do Rio de Janeiro: 1943
- Torneio Início do Rio de Janeiro: 1946, 1951 e 1952
- Troféu Cezar Aboud: 1948
- Troféu Embaixada Brasileira da Guatemala: 1949
- Troféu Comitê Olímpico Nacional da Guatemala: 1949
- Taça Cidade de Ilhéus: 1950
- Copa Elfsborg: 1951
- Torneio Internacional de Lima: 1952
- Troféu Cidade de Arequipa: 1952

Brazil

- Roca Cup: 1945

== See also ==
- List of Clube de Regatas do Flamengo players
