= Moreira (footballer, born 1945) =

Brazilian footballer

Personal information
- Full name: Ismael Moreira Braga
- Date of birth: 18 May 1945 (age 81)
- Place of birth: Rio de Janeiro, Brazil
- Height: 1.81 m (5 ft 11 in)
- Position: Right-back

Youth career
- Bonsucesso

Senior career*
| Years | Team | Apps | (Gls) |
| 1963–1964 | Bonsucesso | | |
| 1965–1970 | Botafogo | 213 | (1) |
| 1971 | Santos | | |
| 1971 | Bahia | | |
| 1972–1973 | Flamengo | 109 | (1) |
| 1974 | Olaria | | |
| 1974–1976 | Atlante | | |
| 1976 | San Antonio Thunder | | |
| 1976–1977 | Tulsa Roughnecks | | |
| 1977–1978 | Team Hawaii | | |
| 1979 | California Sunshine | | |

International career
| 1967–1968 | Brazil | 2 | (0) |
- * Club domestic league appearances and goals

Ismael Moreira Braga (born 18 May 1945), simply known as Moreira, is a Brazilian former professional footballer who played as a right-back.

== Club career ==
Trained in the amateur sectors of Bonsucesso, he arrived at Botafogo FR in 1965, where he initially faced adaptation problems and almost ended up being released. He managed to adapt thanks to coach Admildo Chirol, being part of most of Botafogo's achievements at the end of the 1960s, and reaching the Brazil national team. In 1971 he was involved in an exchange with Carlos Alberto Torres, but did not adapt to Santos FC. He also had a brief spell at Bahia, returning to Flamengo in 1972, where he was state champion and played 109 matches. He also played for Olaria before moving to football in North America. He lives in the United States to this day.

== International career ==
Moreira played for the Brazil national team in two official matches, on 19 September 1967 against Chile, and on 7 August 1968 against Argentina. He was also part of the group that faced the Rest of the World team on 6 November 1968.

== Honours ==
Botafogo

- Torneio Início: 1967
- Taça Guanabara: 1967, 1968
- Campeonato Carioca: 1967, 1968
- Taça Brasil: 1968

Flamengo

- Campeonato Carioca: 1972
- Taça Guanabara: 1972, 1973
