= Liminha (footballer, born 1944) =

Brazilian association football player

Personal information
- Full name: João Crevelim
- Date of birth: 14 June 1944
- Place of birth: Rio de Janeiro, Brazil
- Date of death: 1 November 2013 (aged 69)
- Place of death: Rio de Janeiro, Brazil
- Position: Defensive midfielder

Senior career*
Years	Team	Apps	(Gls)
1968–1975	Flamengo	513	(29)

Managerial career
- 2005: Flamengo B
- * Club domestic league appearances and goals

João Crevelim (14 June 1944 – 1 November 2013), better known as Liminha, was a Brazilian footballer and manager who played as a defensive midfielder. With 513 appearances, Liminha is one of the most capped players in Flamengo history.

== Career ==
Liminha arrived at Flamengo in 1968 as part of the negotiation involving the fullback Cardoso. He played alongside club idol Carlinhos.

Liminha played 513 matches for Flamengo (250 wins, 145 draws, 118 losses). He scored 29 goals, his first being against Guarani in his second match for the club. Liminha has the eighth most appearances by a player in Flamengo history.

In 2005, Liminha briefly took over the manager position of Flamengo's youth teams. He managed seven matches (4 wins, 2 draws, 1 loss).

== Death ==
Liminha died on 1 November 2013 in the ICU of the TotalCor Hospital in Ipanema, Rio de Janeiro as a result of a dental problem that evolved into a generalized infection.

== Titles ==
Flamengo

- Taça Guanabara: 1970, 1972, 1973
- Campeonato Carioca: 1972, 1974

== See also ==
- List of Clube de Regatas do Flamengo players
