= Dequinha =

Dequinha may refer to:

- Dequinha (footballer, born 1928), José Mendonça dos Santos, Brazilian football midfielder
- Dequinha (footballer, born 1955), Ademir Nunes Ribeiro, Brazilian football defender
