= Esquerdinha (footballer, born 1924) =

Brazilian footballer (1924–2014)

Personal information
- Full name: William Kepler Santa Rosa
- Date of birth: 1 March 1924
- Place of birth: Belém, Brazil
- Date of death: 4 September 2014 (aged 90)
- Place of death: Rio de Janeiro, Brazil
- Height: 1.61 m (5 ft 3 in)
- Position: Outside left

Senior career*
Years	Team	Apps	(Gls)
1945–1948	Madureira		
1948	Flamengo		
1948	Madureira		
1949	Flamengo		
1949–1950	Olaria		
1950	Flamengo		
1951	Olaria		
1951–1955	Flamengo		
- * Club domestic league appearances and goals as of 14 April 2024

William Kepler Santa Rosa (1 March 1924 – 4 September 2014), better known as Esquerdinha, was a Brazilian professional footballer who played as a left winger.

== Career ==
Forward, Esquerdinha made history for CR Flamengo where he made 279 appearances and scored 108 goals. He also played for Madureira and Olaria.

== Honours ==
Flamengo

- Campeonato Carioca: 1953, 1954, 1955
- Torneio Triangular Internacional do Rio de Janeiro: 1955

== Death ==
Esquerdinha died in the city of Rio de Janeiro at the age of 90, on 4 September 2014.
