= Duca (footballer) =

Brazilian footballer (1932–2026)

Personal information
- Full name: Adrualdo Barroso da Silva
- Date of birth: 4 May 1934
- Place of birth: Recife, Brazil
- Date of death: 15 August 2026 (aged 92)
- Height: 1.71 m (5 ft 7 in)
- Position: Forward

Youth career
- 1949–1951: América-PE
- 1952–1955: Flamengo

Senior career*
Years	Team	Apps	(Gls)
1953–1958	Flamengo	119	(42)
1958–1964	Real Zaragoza	98	(31)
1965–1966	Mallorca	14	(1)
Total		231	(74)
- * Club domestic league appearances and goals

Adrualdo Barroso da Silva (4 May 1934 – 15 August 2026), better known as Duca, was a Brazilian professional footballer who played as a forward.

== Career ==
Revealed by Flamengo's youth sectors, Duca played for the club from 1954 to 1958, participating in the conquest of three state titles, making 119 appearances and scoring 42 goals. He later played for Real Zaragoza, after performing prominently in the 1958 Teresa Herrera Trophy with Flamengo, where he was champion of the Inter Cities Fairs Cup and the Generalissimo Cup in the 1963–64 season. He also played one last season for Mallorca.

== Death ==
Duca died on 15 August 2026, at the age of 92.

== Honours ==
Flamengo

- Campeonato Carioca: 1953, 1954, 1955

Real Zaragoza

- Copa del Rey: 1963–64
- Inter-Cities Fairs Cup: 1963–64
