= Roberto Miranda =

Brazilian footballer (born 1943)

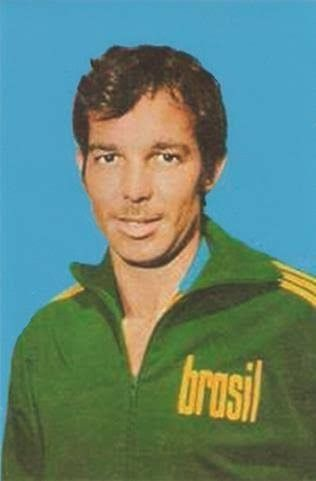
- Roberto with Brazil at the 1970 FIFA World Cup

Personal information
- Full name: Roberto Lopes de Miranda
- Date of birth: 31 July 1943 (age 83)
- Place of birth: Niterói, Brazil
- Positions: Midfielder; forward

Senior career*
Years	Team	Apps	(Gls)
1962–1970	Botafogo	351	(153)
1971–1973	Flamengo	11	(3)
1973–1976	Corinthians	77	(21)
Total		439	(177)

International career
1967–1970	Brazil	12	(6)
Medal record
Men's Football
Representing Brazil
FIFA World Cup
Winner	1970 Mexico
- * Club domestic league appearances and goals

Roberto Lopes de Miranda, sometimes known as just Roberto or Roberto Miranda (born in Niterói, Rio de Janeiro State, 31 July 1943) is a former association footballer who played as a midfielder or striker. His nickname was "Vendaval" (meaning Gale).

Throughout his career (1962–1976) he played for Botafogo, Flamengo, Corinthians and América. He won two Rio de Janeiro State Championship (1967, 1968) and one Brazilian Cup in 1968. For the Brazilian national team he played 12 games between 1968 and 1972 and scored 6 goals. He was also part of the team that won the 1970 FIFA World Cup, playing in two matches.

Together with Jairzinho, Robert Miranda was part of the attack which helped Botafogo to win the Rio (Carioca) Championship consecutively in 1967 and 1968.

In the 1960s, Santos of Pelé, Coutinho, Zito, Edu etc. and Botafogo of Zequinha, Gérson, Jairzinho, Roberto Miranda and Paulo Cesar were the two best teams in Brazil. Botafogo supporters believe that this attack is one of the best attacks in world football history.

Roberto Miranda later left Botafogo to play in Mexico.

== Honours ==
Botafogo

- Campeonato Brasileiro: 1968
- Campeonato Carioca: 1962, 1967, 1968
- Torneio Rio – São Paulo: 1964, 1966
- Torneio de Caracas: 1967, 1968, 1970

Brazil

- FIFA World Cup: 1970
