= Milton Copolillo =

Brazilian footballer

Personal information
- Full name: Milton Copolillo
- Date of birth: 8 August 1933
- Place of birth: Rio de Janeiro, Brazil
- Date of death: 10 March 2012 (aged 78)
- Place of death: Rio de Janeiro, Brazil
- Position: Defender

Youth career
- –1952: Fluminense AC (Niterói)

Senior career*
Years	Team	Apps	(Gls)
1953–1960	Flamengo	183	(2)
1960–1962	Náutico		
- * Club domestic league appearances and goals as of 26 June 2024

Milton Copolillo (8 August 1933 – 10 March 2012), was a Brazilian professional footballer who played as a defender.

== Career ==
Defender, Milton Copolillo played for Flamengo from 1953 to 1960, making 183 appearances and participating in winning three state titles in 1953, 1954, 1955. He was an avowed fan of the club and claimed to love winning, especially against rival CR Vasco da Gama. Copolillo played the last two years of his career at Náutico, becoming champion in 1960.

== Honours ==
Flamengo

- Campeonato Carioca: 1953, 1954, 1955

Náutico

- Campeonato Pernambucano: 1960
