= Jordan (footballer, born 1932) =

Brazilian footballer

Personal information
- Full name: Jordan da Costa
- Date of birth: 24 November 1932
- Place of birth: Rio de Janeiro, Brazil
- Date of death: 17 February 2012 (aged 79)
- Place of death: Rio de Janeiro, Brazil
- Position: Defender

Senior career*
Years	Team	Apps	(Gls)
1951	São Cristóvão	19	(1)
1952–1963	Flamengo	244	(3)

International career
1955	Brazil		
- * Club domestic league appearances and goals

Jordan da Costa (November 24, 1932 – February 17, 2012), best known as simply Jordan, was a Brazilian football player.

Considered by Garrincha as his best defender he ever played against, Jordan was never sent off during his almost 14-year career. A skillful fullback, he was discovered by São Cristóvão in 1949 and three years later signed with Flamengo where he became an idol, winning the Rio State Championship three times in a row (1953-54-55), as well as the 1961 Rio-São Paulo Tournament.

With 609 matches for Flamengo, Jordan has the fourth-highest number of appearances for the club.

Jordan died on February 17, 2012, in Rio de Janeiro of complications from diabetes. He was 79 years old.

== Titles ==
Flamengo

- Campeonato Carioca: 1953, 1954, 1955
- Torneio Início: 1952, 1959
- Torneio Rio-São Paulo: 1961
- Taça dos Campeões Estaduais Rio-São Paulo: 1955

== See also ==
- List of Clube de Regatas do Flamengo players
