= Fernando (footballer, born 1931) =

Brazilian footballer

Personal information
- Full name: Fernando Domingos de Souza
- Date of birth: 25 March 1931
- Place of birth: Rio de Janeiro, Brazil
- Date of death: 14 October 2008 (aged 77)
- Place of death: Rio de Janeiro, Brazil
- Height: 1.83 m (6 ft 0 in)
- Position: Goalkeeper

Youth career
- Bangu

Senior career*
| Years | Team | Apps | (Gls) |
| 1950–1956 | Bangu | 206 | (0) |
| 1957–1963 | Flamengo | 170 | (0) |
| Total | | 376 | (0) |
- * Club domestic league appearances and goals as of 3 June 2024

Fernando Domingos de Souza (25 March 1931 – 14 October 2008), simply known as Fernando, was a Brazilian footballer who played as a goalkeeper.

== Career ==
Bangu's starting goalkeeper during the 1950s, Fernando stood out to the point of being hired by CR Flamengo in 1957. He assumed the starting position from the end of 1958, and played 170 matches for the club, where he played until 1963. In 1955 he was awarded the Belford Duarte Trophy, for having played more than 200 matches without a single expulsion.

== Honours ==
Bangu

- Torneio Início: 1955

Flamengo

- Torneio Rio-São Paulo: 1961

Individual

- Prêmio Belfort Duarte: 1955
