= Ari Carlos =

Brazilian footballer (1933–2011)

Personal information
- Full name: Ari Carlos Seixas
- Date of birth: 16 March 1933
- Place of birth: Mococa, Brazil
- Date of death: 1 February 2011 (aged 77)
- Place of death: Mococa, Brazil
- Position: Goalkeeper

Youth career
- Radium

Senior career*
Years	Team	Apps	(Gls)
1952–1953	Radium		
1953–1955	Bangu		
1955	Olaria		
1956	Bangu		
1957	Madureira		
1957–1962	Flamengo	117	(0)
1962–1965	Olaria		
- * Club domestic league appearances and goals as of 1 June 2024

Ari Carlos Seixas (16 March 1933 – 1 February 2011), better known as Ari Carlos, was a Brazilian footballer who played as a goalkeeper.

== Career ==
A standout at Radium FC in Mococa in the early 1950s, Ari Carlos caught the attention of Bangu AC in Rio de Janeiro. With few opportunities, he also played for Olaria, but it was at Madureira EC where he had his first great run, being hired the following season by Flamengo. At the club, he stood out in winning the Torneio Início in 1959, where he played 117 matches for the club, in addition to winning the Rio-São Paulo championship in 1961. He was called up for the Brazil national football team as a substitute for Gilmar, but did not play.

== Honours ==
Flamengo

- Torneio Rio-São Paulo: 1961
- Torneio Início: 1959
