= Luís Carlos (footballer, born 1936) =

Brazilian footballer

Personal information
- Full name: Luís Carlos Vasconcelos da Silva
- Date of birth: 17 November 1936 (age 89)
- Place of birth: São Gonçalo, Brazil
- Position: Forward

Senior career*
Years	Team	Apps	(Gls)
1957–1961	Flamengo	195	(77)
1961	Náutico		
1962–1963	Atlético Mineiro	53	(21)
1964–1965	Comercial-SP		
- * Club domestic league appearances and goals as of 23 June 2024

Luís Carlos Vasconcelos da Silva (born 17 November 1936), simply known as Luís Carlos, is a Brazilian former footballer who played as a forward.

== Career ==
Born in São Gonçalo, Rio de Janeiro, Luís Carlos began his professional career at Flamengo, a club for which he made 195 appearances and scored 77 goals. He also had a notable spell at Atlético Mineiro, where he was Minas Gerais champion in 1961 and 1962.

After retiring from football, he trained as a lawyer, working in the city of Rio de Janeiro, where he lives to this day.

== Honours ==
Flamengo

- Torneio Rio-São Paulo: 1961
- Torneio Início Carioca: 1959

Atlético Mineiro

- Campeonato Mineiro: 1962, 1963
