= Tião (footballer, born 1918) =

Brazilian footballer

Personal information
- Full name: Sebastião Silva
- Date of birth: 7 October 1918
- Place of birth: Bom Sucesso, Brazil
- Date of death: Unknown
- Position: Forward

Senior career*
Years	Team	Apps	(Gls)
1941–1943	Atlético Mineiro		
1943–1947	Flamengo	153	(58)
1947–1949	Atlético Mineiro		
- * Club domestic league appearances and goals as of 9 March 2024

Sebastião Silva (7 October 1918 – ?), better known as Tião, was a Brazilian professional footballer who played as a forward.

== Career ==
Born in Bom Sucesso, Minas Gerais, Tião played for only two clubs in his career: for Atlético Mineiro, where he was state champion four times, top scorer in the state in 1942 and made 106 appearances with 49 goals, and for Flamengo, where he was champion twice and made 153 appearances, scoring 58 goals. Little is known about his life after his football career.

== Honours ==
Atlético Mineiro

- Campeonato Mineiro: 1941, 1942, 1947, 1949

Flamengo

- Campeonato Carioca: 1943, 1944

Individual

- 1942 Campeonato Mineiro top scorer: 12 goals
