= Dequinha (footballer, born 1955) =

Brazilian footballer

Personal information
- Full name: Ademir Nunes Ribeiro
- Date of birth: 27 March 1955 (age 71)
- Place of birth: Montes Claros, Brazil
- Positions: Defender; defensive midfielder

Youth career
- Sete de Setembro-MG
- Ateneu

Senior career*
Years	Team	Apps	(Gls)
1973–1979	Flamengo	142	(1)
1980–1983	Antwerp		
1984–1986	CSA		
1987	Desportiva		
1988	Fast Clube		
1989	Mogi Mirim		
1990	Taubaté		
- * Club domestic league appearances and goals

Ademir Nunes Ribeiro (born 27 March 1955), better known as Dequinha, is a Brazilian former professional footballer who played as a defender and defensive midfielder.

== Career ==
Versatile and capable of playing in several positions in defense, Dequinha arrived at Flamengo in 1973, where he made 142 appearances. He received his nickname in honor of the Dequinha, a midfielder who also played in Flamengo during the 1950s. He also played for Antwerp in Belgium from 1980 to 1983, and was two-time state champion for CSA in 1984 and 1985, ending his career in 1990 at Taubaté. Became an employee of Rio de Janeiro city hall.

== Honours ==
Flamengo

- Campeonato Carioca: 1978, 1979
- Taça Guanabara: 1978, 1979

CSA

- Campeonato Alagoano: 1984, 1985
