= Marco Aurélio (footballer, born 1940) =

Brazilian footballer

Personal information
- Full name: Marco Aurélio Saldanha da Rocha
- Date of birth: 10 December 1940 (age 85)
- Place of birth: São Paulo, Brazil
- Position: Goalkeeper

Senior career*
Years	Team	Apps	(Gls)
1961–1964	Atlético Paranaense		
1964–1969	Flamengo	144	(0)
1969–1971	Bahia		
1972–1973	Flamengo	0	(0)
- * Club domestic league appearances and goals as of 29 June 2024

Marco Aurélio Saldanha da Rocha (born 10 December 1940), simply known as Marco Aurélio, is a Brazilian former professional footballer who played as a goalkeeper.

== Career ==
Goalkeeper, Marco Aurélio played for Athletico Paranaense, Flamengo, where he made 144 appearances, and EC Bahia.

== Personal life ==
In 2009, Marco Aurélio was appointed secretary of sports for the state of Paraná.

== Honours ==
Flamengo

- Campeonato Carioca: 1965, 1972
- Taça Guanabara: 1972
- Torneio do Povo: 1972
- Trofeo Naranja: 1964
