= 1978 Campeonato Carioca =

Campeonato Carioca
- Season: 1978
- Champions: Flamengo
- Matches played: 132
- Goals scored: 339 (2.57 per match)
- Top goalscorer: Cláudio Adão (Flamengo); Roberto Dinamite (Vasco da Gama); Zico (Flamengo) - 19 goals
- Biggest home win: Flamengo 9-0 Portuguesa (November 11, 1978)
- Biggest away win: Campo Grande; 2-5 Flamengo (October 29, 1978)
- Highest scoring: Flamengo 9-0 Portuguesa (November 11, 1978)

The 1978 edition of the Campeonato Carioca kicked off on September 2, 1978 and ended on December 3, 1978. It was the last official tournament organized by FCF (Federação Carioca de Futebol, or Carioca Football Federation). Only clubs based in the Rio de Janeiro city were allowed to play. Twelve teams contested this edition. Flamengo won the title for the 18th time. no were relegated.

== System ==
The tournament would be divided in three stages:

- Taça Guanabara: The twelve teams all played in a single round-robin format against each other. The champions qualified to the Finals.
- Taça Rio: The twelve teams all played in a single round-robin format against each other. The champions qualified to the Finals.
- Finals: Would be disputed by the two stage winners; in case the same team won both stages, the Finals wouldn't be held.

== Championship ==
=== Taça Guanabara ===
Pos	Team	Pld	W	D	L	GF	GA	GD	Pts	Qualification or relegation
1	Flamengo	11	7	3	1	29	6	+23	17	Champions
2	Fluminense	11	8	1	2	26	9	+17	17	
3	Botafogo	11	6	5	0	22	10	+12	17	
4	Vasco da Gama	11	5	5	1	19	9	+10	15	
5	América	11	4	5	2	12	7	+5	13	
6	São Cristóvão	11	5	3	3	11	16	−5	13	
7	Bonsucesso	11	5	2	4	10	16	−6	12	
8	Madureira	11	3	2	6	10	12	−2	8	
9	Bangu	11	3	2	6	4	14	−10	8	
10	Portuguesa	11	2	3	6	8	18	−10	7	
11	Olaria	11	0	5	6	2	15	−13	5	
12	Campo Grande	11	0	3	8	3	24	−21	3	

Updated to match(es) played on October 15, 1978. Source: RSSSF.com
Rules for classification: 1) points; 2) goal difference; 3) wins; 4) number of goals scored.

=== Taça Rio ===
Pos	Team	Pld	W	D	L	GF	GA	GD	Pts	Qualification or relegation
1	Flamengo	11	10	1	0	31	5	+26	21	Champions
2	Vasco da Gama	11	10	0	1	33	6	+27	20	
3	Fluminense	11	7	2	2	21	9	+12	16	
4	América	11	6	2	3	20	11	+9	14	
5	Botafogo	11	6	1	4	16	8	+8	13	
6	Olaria	11	4	2	5	7	14	−7	10	
7	Bonsucesso	11	2	4	5	14	20	−6	8	
8	São Cristóvão	11	4	0	7	8	22	−14	8	
9	Bangu	11	2	2	7	5	15	−10	6	
10	Campo Grande	11	1	4	6	12	24	−12	6	
11	Portuguesa	11	1	4	6	11	27	−16	6	
12	Madureira	11	1	2	8	5	22	−17	4	

Updated to match(es) played on December 3, 1978. Source: RSSSF.com
Rules for classification: 1) points; 2) goal difference; 3) wins; 4) number of goals scored.

=== Aggregate table ===
Pos	Team	Pld	W	D	L	GF	GA	GD	Pts	Qualification or relegation
1	Flamengo	22	17	4	1	60	11	+49	38	1979 Special Championship
2	Vasco da Gama	22	15	5	2	52	15	+37	35	1979 Special Championship
3	Fluminense	22	15	3	4	47	18	+29	33	1979 Special Championship
4	Botafogo	22	12	6	4	38	18	+20	30	1979 Special Championship
5	América	22	10	7	5	32	18	+14	27	1979 Special Championship
6	São Cristóvão	22	9	3	10	19	38	−19	21	1979 Special Championship
7	Bonsucesso	22	7	6	9	24	36	−12	20	
8	Olaria	22	4	7	11	9	29	−20	15	
9	Bangu	22	5	4	13	9	29	−20	14	
10	Portuguesa	22	3	7	12	19	45	−26	13	
11	Madureira	22	4	4	14	15	34	−19	12	
12	Campo Grande	22	1	7	14	15	48	−33	9	

Updated to match(es) played on December 3, 1978. Source: RSSSF.com
Rules for classification: 1) points; 2) wins; 3) goal difference; 4) number of goals scored.
