= Julio César Barbosa =

Brazilian footballer

Personal information
- Full name: Julio César Barbosa
- Date of birth: 10 February 1960 (age 66)
- Place of birth: Goianésia, Brazil
- Height: 1.78 m (5 ft 10 in)
- Position: Attacking midfielder

Youth career
- Flamengo

Senior career*
Years	Team	Apps	(Gls)
1981–1988	Flamengo	149	(15)
1982–1983	→ America-RJ (loan)		
1984	→ Grêmio (loan)	14	(1)
1988–1989	Racing Santander	3	(1)
- * Club domestic league appearances and goals as of 28 May 2024

Julio César Barbosa (born 10 February 1960) is a Brazilian former professional footballer who played as an attacking midfielder.

== Career ==
An attacking midfielder with speed and skill, he earned the nickname "surfer" because he put paraffin in his hair. He made 149 appearances for Flamengo and was Brazilian champion in 1983. He had spells at America and Grêmio on loan, and ended his career with Racing Santander in the Spanish second division.

== Honours ==
Flamengo

- Campeonato Brasileiro: 1983
- Campeonato Carioca: 1981, 1986
- Taça Rio: 1985, 1986
- Taça Guanabara: 1981, 1988
