= Amado Benigno =

Brazilian footballer (1905–1965)

Amado
Personal information
- Full name: Amado Benigno
- Date of birth: 1 August 1905
- Place of birth: Lábrea, Brazil
- Date of death: 10 September 1965 (aged 60)
- Place of death: Rio de Janeiro, Brazil
- Position: Goalkeeper

Senior career*
Years	Team	Apps	(Gls)
1923–1934	Flamengo	123	(0)
- * Club domestic league appearances and goals as of 25 June 2024

Amado Benigno (1 August 1905 – 10 September 1965), was a Brazilian footballer who played as a goalkeeper.

== Career ==
Son of a military man, he was born in the distant city of Lábrea, Amazonas. Back in Rio de Janeiro, at the time the capital of Brazil, he became involved in football, being Flamengo's goalkeeper from 1923 to 1934, and winning state titles in 1925 and 1927. He played in an unofficial friendly match for the Brazil national team against Rampla Juniors in 1929. In 1930 he was considered the best goalkeeper in Rio de Janeiro, being twice champion of the Campeonato Brasileiro de Seleções Estaduais with Rio de Janeiro (DF) and would be called up for the 1930 FIFA World Cup, but due to not informing CBD about the dispute of an amateur match in Minas Gerais on the eve of the call-up, he ended up being removed from the list.

== Personal life ==
He graduated as a doctor and worked in the profession throughout his life. On 10 September 1965 he died after falling from the balcony of his apartment in Copacabana, Rio de Janeiro.

== Honours ==
Flamengo

- Campeonato Carioca: 1925, 1927
