= 1943 Campeonato Carioca =

Campeonato Carioca
- Season: 1943
- Champions: Flamengo
- Matches: 90
- Goals: 459 (5.1 per match)
- Top goalscorer: João Pinto (São Cristóvão) – 26 goals
- Biggest home win: Canto do Rio 7-2 Bonsucesso (June 20, 1943); Vasco da Gama 7-2 Bangu (July 10, 1943); Vasco da Gama 5-0 Bonsucesso (August 28, 1943); Fluminense 6-1 Bonsucesso (October 10, 1943); Flamengo 5-0 Bangu (October 10, 1943)
- Biggest away win: Bangu 0-7 Vasco da Gama (September 12, 1943)
- Highest scoring: Bangu 7-3 Bonsucesso (July 4, 1943); São Cristóvão 6-4 Vasco da Gama (August 22, 1943); Botafogo 6-4 Bonsucesso (September 18, 1943)

The 1943 edition of the Campeonato Carioca kicked off on June 13, 1943 and ended on October 10, 1943. It was organized by FMF (Federação Metropolitana de Futebol, or Metropolitan Football Federation). Ten teams participated. Flamengo won the title for the 9th time. no teams were relegated.

== System ==
The tournament would be disputed in a double round-robin format, with the team with the most points winning the title.

With the championship how having two rounds instead of the previous year's three, two pre-season tournaments were set up to fill the gap in the clubs' schedules. The first was the Torneio Relâmpago, which would be played by the five 'big' teams, in a single-round robin system. the other, which would be disputed after the Torneio Relâmpago, was the Torneio Municipal, which would be disputed by all the ten league teams, in a single round-robin format. Both tournaments would be short-lived - the Torneio Relâmpago had its last edition in 1946, being cancelled as Olaria's entrance into the league in 1947 made the additional dates provided by it unnecessary. In turn, the Torneio Municipal would be discontinued after 1948, with only one more isolated edition being held in 1951.

== Torneio Relâmpago ==
Pos	Team	Pld	W	D	L	GF	GA	GD	Pts	Qualification or relegation
1	Flamengo	4	2	1	1	8	7	+1	5	Champions
2	América	4	1	2	1	12	10	+2	4	
3	Fluminense	4	1	2	1	13	12	+1	4	
4	Vasco da Gama	4	1	2	1	8	11	−3	4	
5	Botafogo	4	1	1	2	8	9	−1	3	

Updated to match(es) played on March 24, 1943. Source: RSSSF.com
Rules for classification: 1) points; 2) goal difference; 3) wins; 4) number of goals scored.

== Torneio Municipal ==
Pos	Team	Pld	W	D	L	GF	GA	GD	Pts	Qualification or relegation
1	São Cristóvão	9	7	1	1	29	17	+12	15	Champions
2	Fluminense	9	5	3	1	21	11	+10	13	
3	Botafogo	9	5	2	2	34	18	+16	12	
4	América	9	5	2	2	20	14	+6	12	
5	Canto do Rio	9	5	2	2	24	23	+1	12	
6	Flamengo	9	4	2	3	21	16	+5	10	
7	Vasco da Gama	9	2	2	5	11	17	−6	6	
8	Bonsucesso	9	2	2	5	14	26	−12	6	
9	Madureira	9	1	2	6	14	27	−13	4	
10	Bangu	9	0	0	9	14	33	−19	0	

Updated to match(es) played on June 6, 1943. Source: RSSSF.com
Rules for classification: 1) points; 2) goal difference; 3) wins; 4) number of goals scored.

== Championship ==
Pos	Team	Pld	W	D	L	GF	GA	GD	Pts	Qualification or relegation
1	Flamengo	18	11	6	1	51	18	+33	28	Champions
2	Fluminense	18	12	2	4	48	31	+17	26	
3	São Cristóvão	18	12	1	5	59	43	+16	25	
4	Vasco da Gama	18	11	2	5	64	38	+26	24	
5	América	18	9	2	7	55	40	+15	20	
6	Bangu	18	5	6	7	48	65	−17	16	
7	Botafogo	18	6	2	10	40	51	−11	14	
8	Madureira	18	4	6	8	34	45	−11	14	
9	Canto do Rio	18	5	1	12	36	52	−16	11	
10	Bonsucesso	18	0	2	16	24	76	−52	2	

Updated to match(es) played on October 10, 1943. Source: RSSSF.com
Rules for classification: 1) points; 2) goal difference; 3) wins; 4) number of goals scored.

== Top Scores ==
Rank	Player	Club	Goals
1	João Pinto	São Cristóvão	26
2	Ademir	Vasco da Gama	22
3	José Perácio	Flamengo	14
3	Adolpho Milman	Fluminense	14
