= Gringo (restaurant) =

Filipino restaurant chain

- Gringo branch in SM City Baguio
- Industry: Restaurants
- Founded: 2016 in SM North EDSA
- Number of locations: 16
- Area served: Philippines
- Key people: Jaime E. Ysmael (CEO)
- Products: Latin American cuisine
- Owner: Reagan Tan; Aileen Tan
- Parent: Ortigas & Co.
- Website: gringo.ph

Gringo is a Filipino restaurant chain primarily serving Latin American cuisine, with inspiration from Tex-Mex cuisine.

Gringo is known for its roast chicken and barbecued ribs.

== History ==
Gringo opened its first location in 2016 at SM North EDSA. It opened its first location outside of Metro Manila on 2017 at SM CDO Downtown. It opened its biggest branch in 2018 at the Greenhills Shopping Center which includes a private dining area.

In 2023, Gringo opened Gringito, a spinoff restaurant wherein customers can mix and match different Gringo offerings, located in The Podium.
