= Gringo (footballer) =

Brazilian footballer

Personal information
- Full name: Orisvaldo dos Santos
- Date of birth: 26 September 1926
- Place of birth: Riachuelo, Brazil
- Date of death: 2003 (aged 76–77)
- Place of death: Rio de Janeiro, Brazil
- Position: Forward

Senior career*
Years	Team	Apps	(Gls)
1945	Sergipe		
1946–1947	Vitória		
1947–1952	Flamengo	121	(66)
1952	Bonsucesso		
1953	Ponte Preta		
1953	Grêmio	27	(13)
1954	Olaria		
1955–1957	Sport Recife		
1958–1959	Fluminense de Feira		
- * Club domestic league appearances and goals as of 29 June 2024

Orisvaldo dos Santos (26 September 1926 – 2003), better known as Gringo, was a Brazilian professional footballer who played as a forward.

== Career ==
A striker who played for several Brazilian football teams, Gringo played in particular for Flamengo, where he made 121 appearances and scored 66 goals, and for Grêmio, where he played in 1953. He won two state championships with Sport of Gentil Cardoso in 1955 and 1956. Passed away in 2003.

== Honours ==
Sport Recife

- Campeonato Pernambucano: 1955, 1956
