= Gringo Gulch =

Valley in Santa Cruz County, Arizona, US

Coordinates: 31°33′56″N 110°46′35″W

Gringo Gulch is a valley in Santa Cruz County, Arizona, in the United States.

The valley's name is derived from the ethnonym gringo.
