= 1974 Campeonato Carioca =

Campeonato Carioca
- Season: 1974
- Champions: Flamengo
- Copa Brasil: Vasco da Gama; Flamengo; Fluminense; América; Botafogo
- Matches: 125
- Goals: 271 (2.17 per match)
- Top goalscorer: Luisinho Lemos (América) - 20 goals
- Biggest home win: Fluminense 4-0 Bangu (August 24, 1974); Botafogo 4-0 Bonsucesso (September 28, 1974)
- Biggest away win: Vasco da Gama 1-5 Fluminense (September 8, 1974); Madureira 1-5 Flamengo (October 9, 1974); Madureira 1-5 América (October 12, 1974)
- Highest scoring: Vasco da Gama 1-5 Fluminense (September 8, 1974); Madureira 1-5 Flamengo (October 9, 1974); Madureira 1-5 América (October 12, 1974)

The 1974 edition of the Campeonato Carioca kicked off on August 3, 1974, and ended on December 22, 1974. It was organized by FCF (Federação Carioca de Futebol, or Carioca Football Federation). Twelve teams participated. Flamengo won the title for the 17th time. No teams were relegated.

== System ==
The tournament would be divided in four stages:

- Taça Guanabara: The twelve teams all played in a single round-robin format against each other. The champions qualified to the Final phase. The eight best teams qualified to the Second round.
- Taça Oscar Wright da Silva: The remaining eight teams all played in a single round-robin format against each other. The champions qualified to the Final phase.
- Taça Pedro Magalhães Corrêa: The eight teams all played in a single round-robin format against each other. The champions qualified to the Final phase.
- Final phase: The three stage winners played in a single round-robin format against each other. the team with the most points won the title.

== Championship ==
=== Taça Guanabara ===
Pos	Team	Pld	W	D	L	GF	GA	GD	Pts	Qualification or relegation
1	América	11	9	1	1	19	4	+15	19	Qualified to Final phase
2	Fluminense	11	8	2	1	22	7	+15	18	Qualified
3	Flamengo	11	6	3	2	17	10	+7	15	Qualified
4	Vasco da Gama	11	7	1	3	18	15	+3	15	Qualified
5	Botafogo	11	4	5	2	16	11	+5	13	Qualified
6	Bonsucesso	11	4	4	3	9	6	+3	12	Qualified
7	Madureira	11	3	5	3	13	11	+2	11	Qualified
8	Campo Grande	11	1	6	4	6	11	−5	8	Qualified
9	São Cristóvão	11	2	3	6	4	16	−12	7	
10	Portuguesa	11	1	4	6	3	11	−8	6	
11	Olaria	11	2	1	8	5	17	−12	5	
12	Bangu	11	0	3	8	2	18	−16	3	

Updated to match(es) played on September 25, 1974. Source: RSSSF.com
Rules for classification: 1) points; 2) goal difference; 3) wins; 4) number of goals scored.

=== Taça Oscar Wright da Silva ===
Pos	Team	Pld	W	D	L	GF	GA	GD	Pts	Qualification or relegation
1	Vasco da Gama	7	4	3	0	9	3	+6	11	Qualified to Final phase
2	Flamengo	7	3	4	0	12	4	+8	10	
3	Botafogo	7	4	2	1	10	4	+6	10	
4	América	7	4	1	2	13	10	+3	9	
5	Fluminense	7	2	2	3	5	4	+1	6	
6	Madureira	7	2	0	5	7	15	−8	4	
7	Bonsucesso	7	1	2	4	4	12	−8	4	
8	Campo Grande	7	0	2	5	2	10	−8	2	

Updated to match(es) played on November 3, 1974. Source: RSSSF.com
Rules for classification: 1) points; 2) goal difference; 3) wins; 4) number of goals scored.

=== Taça Pedro Magalhães Corrêa ===
Pos	Team	Pld	W	D	L	GF	GA	GD	Pts	Qualification or relegation
1	Flamengo	7	5	1	1	11	6	+5	11	Qualified to Final phase
2	Vasco da Gama	7	4	2	1	14	8	+6	10	
3	América	7	5	0	2	12	8	+4	10	
4	Botafogo	7	2	3	2	11	9	+2	7	
5	Campo Grande	7	2	3	2	5	7	−2	7	
6	Fluminense	7	1	3	3	3	6	−3	5	
7	Bonsucesso	7	1	2	4	6	9	−3	4	
8	Madureira	7	0	2	5	3	12	−9	2	

Updated to match(es) played on December 8, 1974. Source: RSSSF.com
Rules for classification: 1) points; 2) goal difference; 3) wins; 4) number of goals scored.

=== Final phase ===
Pos	Team	Pld	W	D	L	GF	GA	GD	Pts	Qualification or relegation
1	Flamengo	2	1	1	0	2	1	+1	3	Champions
2	Vasco da Gama	2	1	0	1	2	2	0	2	
3	América	2	0	1	1	3	4	−1	1	

Updated to match(es) played on December 22, 1974. Source: RSSSF.com
Rules for classification: 1) points; 2) goal difference; 3) wins; 4) number of goals scored.

== Top Scores ==
Rank	Player	Club	Goals
1	Luizinho Lemos	América	20
2	Zico	Flamengo	19
3	Nilson Días	Botafogo	18
4	Roberto Dinamite	Vasco da Gama	17
5	Gil	Fluminense	11
6	Doval	Flamengo	10
