= Fred (footballer, born 1949) =

Brazilian footballer (1949–2022)

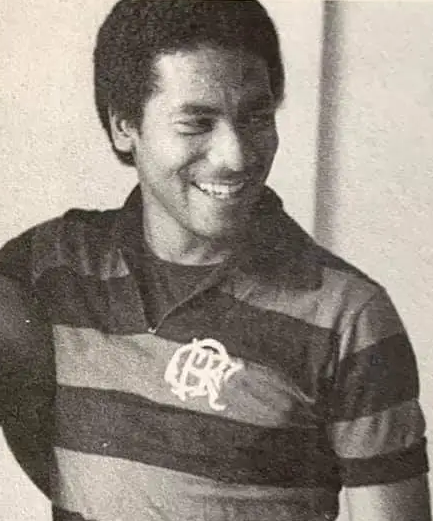
- Fred in 1972

Personal information
- Full name: Frederico Rodrigues de Oliveira
- Date of birth: 4 April 1949
- Place of birth: Rio de Janeiro, Brazil
- Date of death: 29 May 2022 (aged 73)
- Height: 1.78 m (5 ft 10 in)
- Position: Centre-back

Senior career*
Years	Team	Apps	(Gls)
1970–1974	Flamengo		
1974–1975	Vasco da Gama		
1975–1976	Flamengo		
1976	Bangu		
1976	Volta Redonda		
1976–1979	Botafogo		

International career
- Brazil Olympic
- * Club domestic league appearances and goals

Frederico Rodrigues de Oliveira (4 April 1949 – 29 May 2022), known as just Fred, was a Brazilian footballer who played as a centre-back. He competed in the men's tournament at the 1972 Summer Olympics.
