= 1967 Campeonato Carioca =

Campeonato Carioca
- Season: 1967
- Champions: Botafogo
- Torneio Roberto Gomes Pedrosa: Vasco da Gama; Flamengo; Fluminense; Bangu; Botafogo
- Taça Brasil: Botafogo
- Matches played: 94
- Goals scored: 252 (2.68 per match)
- Top goalscorer: Paulo Borges (Bangu) - 13 goals
- Biggest home win: Vasco da Gama 4-0 Flamengo (November 11, 1967)
- Biggest away win: São Cristóvão 0-5 Fluminense (October 7, 1967); Olaria 0-5 Bangu (November 19, 1967)
- Highest scoring: Flamengo 3-3 Campo Grande (September 10, 1967); São Cristóvão 2-4 Olaria (October 1, 1967); Campo Grande 1-5 Fluminense (December 3, 1967); Campo Grande 3-3 Flamengo (December 13, 1967)

The 1967 edition of the Campeonato Carioca kicked off on August 23, 1967 and ended on December 17, 1967. It was organized by FCF (Federação Carioca de Futebol, or Carioca Football Federation). Twelve teams participated. Botafogo won the title for the 13th time. no teams were relegated.

== System ==
The tournament would be divided in two stages:

- First round: The twelve teams all played in a single round-robin format against each other. The eight best teams in each group qualified to the Second round.
- Second round: The remaining eight teams all played in a single round-robin format against each other. The team with the most points won the title.

== Championship ==
=== First round ===
Pos	Team	Pld	W	D	L	GF	GA	GD	Pts	Qualification or relegation
1	Botafogo	11	9	1	1	17	7	+10	19	Qualified
2	Bangu	11	9	0	2	21	10	+11	18	Qualified
3	Fluminense	11	7	1	3	19	11	+8	15	Qualified
4	Flamengo	11	6	1	4	19	16	+3	13	Qualified
5	Olaria	11	6	0	5	16	14	+2	12	Qualified
6	Vasco da Gama	11	5	1	5	21	14	+7	11	Qualified
7	América	11	5	1	5	17	14	+3	11	Qualified
8	Campo Grande	11	3	5	3	12	14	−2	11	Qualified
9	Bonsucesso	11	4	2	5	13	13	0	10	
10	Madureira	11	3	2	6	10	18	−8	8	
11	Portuguesa	11	1	1	9	5	21	−16	3	
12	São Cristóvão	11	0	1	10	7	25	−18	1	

Updated to match(es) played on November 12, 1967. Source: RSSSF.com
Rules for classification: 1) points; 2) goal difference; 3) wins; 4) number of goals scored.

=== Second round ===
Pos	Team	Pld	W	D	L	GF	GA	GD	Pts	Qualification or relegation
1	Botafogo	7	6	1	0	13	4	+9	13	Champions
2	Bangu	7	6	0	1	17	6	+11	12	
3	Fluminense	7	4	1	2	15	10	+5	9	
4	América	7	2	2	3	6	7	−1	6	
5	Vasco da Gama	7	1	3	3	6	8	−2	5	
6	Flamengo	7	1	2	4	10	14	−4	4	
7	Campo Grande	7	1	2	4	5	14	−9	4	
8	Olaria	7	1	1	5	3	12	−9	3	

Updated to match(es) played on December 17, 1967. Source: RSSSF.com
Rules for classification: 1) points; 2) goal difference; 3) goal average; 4) wins.

== Taça Guanabara ==
Pos	Team	Pld	W	D	L	GF	GA	GD	Pts	Qualification or relegation
1	América	5	4	0	1	10	4	+6	8	Playoffs
2	Botafogo	5	4	0	1	10	5	+5	8	Playoffs
3	Vasco da Gama	5	3	0	2	11	11	0	6	
4	Bangu	5	2	1	2	6	6	0	5	
5	Flamengo	5	1	1	3	6	10	−4	3	
6	Fluminense	5	0	0	5	3	10	−7	0	

Updated to match(es) played on August 16, 1967. Source: RSSSF.com
Rules for classification: 1) points; 2) goal difference; 3) wins; 4) number of goals scored.

=== Playoffs ===
20 August 1967
Final

Botafogo	3 – 2 (a.e.t.)	América
Paulo César Caju 1' 70' 105'	Report	Edu 2'; Eduardo 62'

Maracanã, Rio de Janeiro
Attendance: 82,421
Referee: Cláudio Magalhães
