= 1968 Campeonato Carioca =

Campeonato Carioca
- Season: 1968
- Champions: Botafogo
- Torneio Roberto Gomes Pedrosa: Vasco da Gama; Flamengo; Fluminense; Bangu; Botafogo
- Taça Brasil: Botafogo
- Matches played: 94
- Goals scored: 224 (2.38 per match)
- Top goalscorer: Roberto (Botafogo) - 13 goals
- Biggest home win: Botafogo 5-0 Bonsucesso (April 6, 1968)
- Biggest away win: São Cristóvão 0-5 Flamengo (March 27, 1968)
- Highest scoring: São Cristóvão 2-4 Bangu (March 24, 1968); Fluminense 4-2 Campo Grande (April 3, 1968); Fluminense 2-4 Flamengo (April 20, 1968)

The 1968 edition of the Campeonato Carioca kicked off on March 9, 1968 and ended on June 9, 1968. It was organized by FCF (Federação Carioca de Futebol, or Carioca Football Federation). Twelve teams participated. Botafogo won the title for the 14th time. no teams were relegated.

== System ==
The tournament would be divided in two stages:

- First round: The twelve teams were divided into two groups of six, and each team played in a single round-robin format against all other teams. The four best teams in each group qualified to the Second round.
- Second round: The remaining eight teams all played in a single round-robin format against each other. The team with the most points won the title.

== Championship ==
=== First round ===
==== Group A ====
Pos	Team	Pld	W	D	L	GF	GA	GD	Pts	Qualification or relegation
1	Botafogo	11	8	2	1	23	8	+15	18	Qualified
2	Flamengo	11	8	1	2	23	8	+15	17	Qualified
3	América	11	5	4	2	15	8	+7	14	Qualified
4	Bonsucesso	11	4	3	4	11	17	−6	11	Qualified
5	Campo Grande	11	2	4	5	9	13	−4	8	
6	Portuguesa	11	1	2	8	4	21	−17	4	

Updated to match(es) played on May 2, 1968. Source: RSSSF.com
Rules for classification: 1) points; 2) goal difference; 3) wins; 4) number of goals scored.

==== Group B ====
Pos	Team	Pld	W	D	L	GF	GA	GD	Pts	Qualification or relegation
1	Vasco da Gama	11	10	0	1	25	7	+18	20	Qualified
2	Bangu	11	4	3	4	15	14	+1	11	Qualified
3	Madureira	11	4	3	4	11	12	−1	11	Qualified
4	Fluminense	11	3	3	5	14	18	−4	9	Qualified
5	Olaria	11	3	1	7	11	13	−2	7	
6	São Cristóvão	11	0	2	9	4	26	−22	2	

Updated to match(es) played on May 2, 1968. Source: RSSSF.com
Rules for classification: 1) points; 2) goal difference; 3) wins; 4) number of goals scored.

=== Second round ===
Pos	Team	Pld	W	D	L	GF	GA	GD	Pts	Qualification or relegation
1	Botafogo	7	7	0	0	17	2	+15	14	Champions
2	Flamengo	7	3	3	1	12	7	+5	9	
3	Vasco da Gama	7	3	3	1	5	6	−1	9	
4	Fluminense	7	2	2	3	6	7	−1	6	
5	Bangu	7	2	2	3	7	9	−2	6	
6	América	7	2	2	3	7	10	−3	6	
7	Bonsucesso	7	0	4	3	3	8	−5	4	
8	Madureira	7	0	2	5	2	10	−8	2	

Updated to match(es) played on June 9, 1968. Source: RSSSF.com
Rules for classification: 1) points; 2) goal difference; 3) goal average; 4) wins.

== Taça Guanabara ==
=== First round ===
Pos	Team	Pld	W	D	L	GF	GA	GD	Pts	Qualification or relegation
1	Botafogo	6	3	3	0	6	3	+3	9	Playoffs
2	Flamengo	6	4	1	1	6	4	+2	9	Playoffs
3	Fluminense	6	3	1	2	12	8	+4	7	
4	Bonsucesso	6	2	1	3	4	8	−4	5	
5	Vasco da Gama	6	1	3	2	7	8	−1	5	
6	América	6	1	2	3	6	8	−2	4	
7	Bangu	6	1	1	4	5	7	−2	3	

Updated to match(es) played on September 11, 1968. Source: RSSSF.com
Rules for classification: 1) points; 2) goal difference; 3) wins; 4) number of goals scored.

==== Playoffs ====
18 September 1968
Final

Botafogo	4 – 1	Flamengo
Gérson 10' 74' (pen.); Zequinha 65'; Roberto 81'	Report	Dionísio 74'

Maracanã, Rio de Janeiro
Attendance: 94,535
Referee: Armando Marques
