= 1961 Torneio Rio-São Paulo =

Torneio Rio-São Paulo
- Season: 1961
- Champions: Flamengo (1st title)
- Matches played: 54
- Goals scored: 191 (3.54 per match)
- Top goalscorer: Coutinho (Santos); Pepe (Santos) – 9 goals each
- Biggest home win: Fluminense 7–0 Portuguesa (9 Apr)

The 1961 Torneio Rio São Paulo was the 14th edition of the Torneio Rio-São Paulo. It was disputed between 1 March to 24 April.

== Participants ==
Team	City	Nº participations	Best result
America	Rio de Janeiro	11	6th (1951)
Botafogo	Rio de Janeiro	11	Runners-up: 1960
Corinthians	(São Paulo (state)) São Paulo	14	Champions: 1950, 1953, 1954
Flamengo	Rio de Janeiro	13	Runners-up: 1957, 1958
Fluminense	Rio de Janeiro	13	Champions: 1957, 1960
Palmeiras	(São Paulo (state)) São Paulo	14	Champions: 1933, 1951
Portuguesa	(São Paulo (state)) São Paulo	14	Champions: 1952, 1955
Santos	(São Paulo (state)) Santos	11	Champions: 1959
São Paulo	(São Paulo (state)) São Paulo	14	Runners-up: 1933
Vasco da Gama	Rio de Janeiro	14	Champions: 1958

== Format ==
The tournament were disputed in a two stages. In the first, clubs were split in two groups: Group A, with the teams of São Paulo, and Group B, with the teams of Rio de Janeiro. Clubs from group A played against clubs from group A and group B. The three clubs with the best performance in each group were qualified to the final round. In the final round, the clubs only plays against teams from the other state.

== Tournament ==
Following is the summary of the 1961 Torneio Rio-São Paulo tournament:

=== First round ===
Group A

Pos	Team	Pld	W	D	L	GF	GA	GD	Pts	Qualification
1	(São Paulo (state)) Santos	9	7	1	1	30	9	+21	15	Qualified to final round
2	(São Paulo (state)) Corinthians	9	5	1	3	20	13	+7	11	Qualified to final round
3	(São Paulo (state)) Palmeiras	9	4	3	2	15	12	+3	11	Qualified to final round
4	(São Paulo (state)) São Paulo	9	2	3	4	12	15	−3	7	
5	(São Paulo (state)) Portuguesa	9	1	1	7	9	25	−16	3	

Source: RSSSF
Rules for classification: 1) points; 2) tiebreaker match; 3) wins; 4) goal difference; 5) goals for.

Group B

Pos	Team	Pld	W	D	L	GF	GA	GD	Pts	Qualification
1	Botafogo	9	5	1	3	20	14	+6	11	Qualified to final round
2	Vasco da Gama	9	5	0	4	19	19	0	10	Qualified to final round
3	Flamengo	9	5	0	4	12	20	−8	10	Qualified to final round
4	Fluminense	9	4	0	5	19	18	+1	8	
5	America	9	2	0	7	13	24	−11	4	

Source: RSSSF
Rules for classification: 1) points; 2) tiebreaker match; 3) wins; 4) goal difference; 5) goals for.

=== Final round ===
Pos	Team	Pld	W	D	L	GF	GA	GD	Pts
1	Flamengo (C)	3	3	0	0	10	2	+8	6
2	Botafogo	3	2	1	0	3	1	+2	5
3	Vasco da Gama	3	2	0	1	4	2	+2	4
4	(São Paulo (state)) Palmeiras	3	1	1	1	2	3	−1	3
5	(São Paulo (state)) Corinthians	3	0	0	3	0	5	−5	0
6	(São Paulo (state)) Santos	3	0	0	3	3	9	−6	0

Source: RSSSF
Rules for classification: 1) points; 2) tiebreaker match; 3) wins; 4) goal difference; 5) goals for.
(C) Champions
