= Dequinha (footballer, born 1928) =

Brazilian footballer (1928–1997)

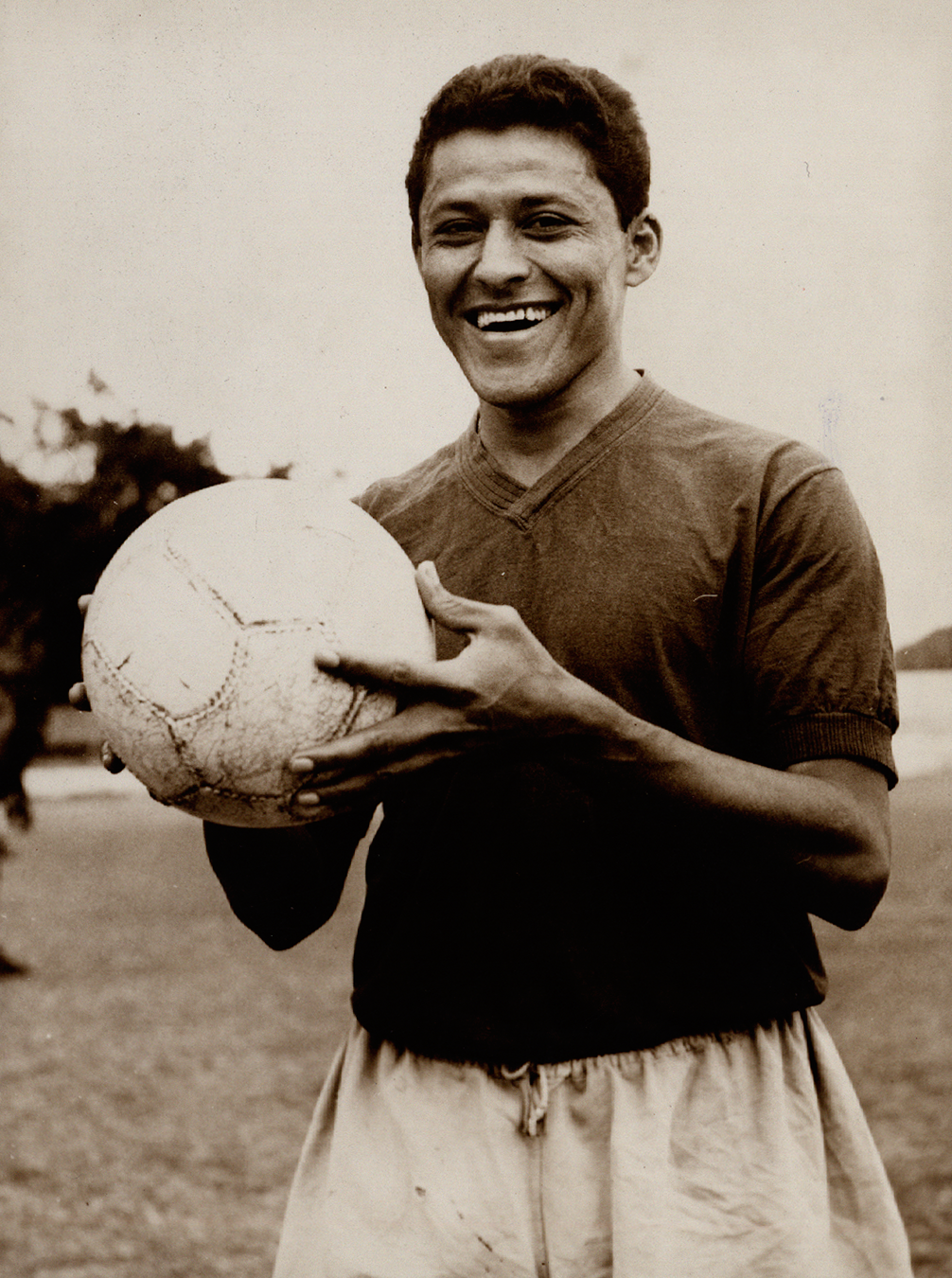

Personal information
- Full name: José Mendonça dos Santos
- Date of birth: March 19, 1928
- Place of birth: Mossoró, Brazil
- Date of death: July 23, 1997 (aged 69)
- Position: Defensive midfielder

Senior career*
Years	Team	Apps	(Gls)
1946	Potiguar de Mossoró		
1947–1949	ABC		
1950	América-PE	2	(0)
1950–1961	Flamengo	203	(6)
1961	Botafogo	0	(0)
1962	Campo Grande	13	(0)
1963	América-PE		

International career
1954–1956	Brazil	7	(0)

Managerial career
- 1970–1972: Sergipe
- 1973: Desportiva Ferroviária
- 1975: Itabaiana
- 1986–1987: Itabaiana
- 1989: Itabaiana
- * Club domestic league appearances and goals

José Mendonça dos Santos, simply known as Dequinha (March 19, 1928 – July 23, 1997), was a Brazilian footballer.

The midfielder started his career in played yet for Potiguar de Mossoró, ABC (where he won the 1947 Rio Grande do Norte State Championship), and América-PE until 1950 when he signed with Flamengo. Dequinha was a key player during Flamengo's 1953-54-55 Rio State Championships campaigns.

He played the 1954 FIFA World Cup for Brazil and remained in the national team for another two years.

In 1960, he transferred to Campo Grande-RJ where he retired two years later.

Dequinha died on September 29, 1997, in Aracaju, Brazil.

== Honours ==
=== Player ===
ABC

- Campeonato Potiguar: 1947

Flamengo

- Campeonato Carioca: 1953, 1954, 1955

=== Manager ===
Sergipe

- Campeonato Sergipano: 1970, 1971, 1972
