= 1953 Campeonato Carioca =

Campeonato Carioca
- Season: 1953
- Champions: Flamengo
- Matches played: 147
- Goals scored: 504 (3.43 per match)
- Top goalscorer: Benítez (Flamengo) – 22 goals
- Biggest home win: Bangu 8-1 Portuguesa (November 1, 1953); América 7-0 Madureira (November 29, 1953)
- Biggest away win: Bangu 2-7 Fluminense (September 27, 1953); Portuguesa 0-5 Flamengo (November 11, 1953); Madureira 0-5 Flamengo (November 22, 1953)
- Highest scoring: Botafogo 6-3 Bonsucesso (July 19, 1953); Bangu 2-7 Fluminense (September 27, 1953); Bangu 8-1 Portuguesa (November 1, 1953)

The 1953 edition of the Campeonato Carioca kicked off on July 11, 1953 and ended on January 20, 1954. It was organized by FMF (Federação Metropolitana de Futebol, or Metropolitan Football Federation). Twelve teams participated. Flamengo won the title for the 11th time. no teams were relegated.

== System ==
The tournament would be divided in two stages:

- First phase: The twelve teams all played against each other in a double round-robin format. The six best teams qualified to the Third round (The first and second rounds were part of the First phase). The team with the most points qualified to the Finals.
- Third round: The remaining six teams all played in a single round-robin format against each other. The team with the most points qualified to the Finals.
- Finals: The finals would be disputed in a best-of-three-points series. In case the same team won all three rounds, it won the title automatically.

== Championship ==
=== First phase ===
| Pos | Team | Pld | W | D | L | GF | GA | GD | Pts | Qualification or relegation |
|---|---|---|---|---|---|---|---|---|---|---|
| 1 | Flamengo | 22 | 16 | 4 | 2 | 66 | 25 | +41 | 36 | Qualified to Finals |
| 2 | Botafogo | 22 | 16 | 3 | 3 | 57 | 23 | +34 | 35 | Qualified to Third round |
| 3 | Fluminense | 22 | 16 | 3 | 3 | 50 | 23 | +27 | 35 | Qualified to Third round |
| 4 | Vasco da Gama | 22 | 11 | 8 | 3 | 59 | 30 | +29 | 30 | Qualified to Third round |
| 5 | América | 22 | 11 | 4 | 7 | 47 | 32 | +15 | 26 | Qualified to Third round |
| 6 | Bangu | 22 | 9 | 5 | 8 | 41 | 39 | +2 | 23 | Qualified to Third round |
| 7 | Madureira | 22 | 7 | 6 | 9 | 18 | 43 | −25 | 20 | |
| 8 | Olaria | 22 | 4 | 7 | 11 | 28 | 39 | −11 | 15 | |
| 9 | São Cristóvão | 22 | 4 | 7 | 11 | 25 | 39 | −14 | 15 | |
| 10 | Bonsucesso | 22 | 4 | 4 | 14 | 33 | 51 | −18 | 12 | |
| 11 | Portuguesa | 22 | 5 | 0 | 17 | 20 | 56 | −36 | 10 | |
| 12 | Canto do Rio | 22 | 2 | 3 | 17 | 20 | 64 | −44 | 7 | |

Updated to match(es) played on December 6, 1954. Source: RSSSF.com
Rules for classification: 1) points; 2) goal difference; 3) wins; 4) number of goals scored.

=== Third round ===
| Pos | Team | Pld | W | D | L | GF | GA | GD | Pts | Qualification or relegation |
|---|---|---|---|---|---|---|---|---|---|---|
| 1 | Flamengo | 5 | 5 | 0 | 0 | 11 | 2 | +9 | 10 | Champions |
| 2 | Fluminense | 5 | 3 | 0 | 2 | 8 | 7 | +1 | 6 | |
| 3 | Bangu | 5 | 2 | 1 | 2 | 7 | 9 | −2 | 5 | |
| 4 | Vasco da Gama | 5 | 1 | 2 | 2 | 9 | 10 | −1 | 4 | |
| 5 | América | 5 | 1 | 1 | 3 | 3 | 7 | −4 | 3 | |
| 6 | Botafogo | 5 | 0 | 2 | 3 | 2 | 5 | −3 | 2 | |

Updated to match(es) played on January 20, 1954. Source: RSSSF.com
Rules for classification: 1) points; 2) goal difference; 3) wins; 4) number of goals scored.

== Top Scores ==
| Rank | Player | Club | Goals |
|---|---|---|---|
| 1 | Jorge Duilio Benítez | Flamengo | 22 |
| 2 | Garrincha | Botafogo | 20 |
| 3 | Marinho | Fluminense | 19 |
| 4 | Índio | Flamengo | 18 |
| 5 | Pinga | Vasco da Gama | 17 |
| 5 | Rubens | Flamengo | 17 |
| 7 | Nívio | Bangu | 16 |
| 7 | Alvinho | Vasco da Gama | 16 |
| 9 | Ferreira | America | 15 |
| 9 | Telê | Fluminense | 15 |
