= 1954 Campeonato Carioca =

Campeonato Carioca
- Season: 1954
- Champions: Flamengo
- Matches played: 147
- Goals scored: 568 (3.86 per match)
- Top goalscorer: Dino da Costa (Botafogo) – 24 goals
- Biggest home win: Bangu 8-1 Madureira (August 22, 1954)
- Biggest away win: Madureira 1-8 Fluminense (January 2, 1955)
- Highest scoring: Bangu 8-1 Madureira (August 22, 1954); Madureira 1-8 Fluminense (January 2, 1955)

The 1954 edition of the Campeonato Carioca kicked off on August 21, 1954 and ended on February 27, 1955. It was organized by FMF (Federação Metropolitana de Futebol, or Metropolitan Football Federation). Twelve teams participated. Flamengo won the title for the 12th time. no teams were relegated.

== System ==
The tournament would be divided in two stages:

- First phase: The twelve teams all played against each other in a double round-robin format. The six best teams qualified to the Third round (The first and second rounds were part of the First phase). The team with the most points qualified to the Finals.
- Third round: The remaining six teams all played in a single round-robin format against each other. The team with the most points qualified to the Finals.
- Finals: The finals would be disputed in a best-of-three-points series. In case the same team won all three rounds, it won the title automatically.

== Championship ==
=== First phase ===
Pos	Team	Pld	W	D	L	GF	GA	GD	Pts	Qualification or relegation
1	Flamengo	22	15	5	2	49	20	+29	35	Qualified to Finals
2	Bangu	22	14	6	2	59	26	+33	34	Qualified to Third round
3	América	22	14	5	3	44	19	+25	33	Qualified to Third round
4	Fluminense	22	13	5	4	58	28	+30	31	Qualified to Third round
5	Vasco da Gama	22	14	3	5	54	27	+27	31	Qualified to Third round
6	Botafogo	22	11	4	7	53	36	+17	26	Qualified to Third round
7	São Cristóvão	22	5	6	11	29	49	−20	16	
8	Madureira	22	5	3	14	29	66	−37	13	
9	Bonsucesso	22	4	5	13	23	44	−21	13	
10	Olaria	22	4	3	15	36	57	−21	11	
11	Portuguesa	22	4	3	15	31	53	−22	11	
12	Canto do Rio	22	3	4	15	29	69	−40	10	

Updated to match(es) played on January 23, 1955. Source: RSSSF.com
Rules for classification: 1) points; 2) goal difference; 3) wins; 4) number of goals scored.

=== Third round ===
Pos	Team	Pld	W	D	L	GF	GA	GD	Pts	Qualification or relegation
1	Flamengo	5	4	1	0	15	7	+8	9	Champions
2	América	5	3	1	1	15	8	+7	7	
3	Vasco da Gama	5	1	3	1	10	9	+1	5	
4	Botafogo	5	1	2	2	8	11	−3	4	
5	Bangu	5	1	1	3	7	14	−7	3	
6	Fluminense	5	0	2	3	9	15	−6	2	

Updated to match(es) played on February 27, 1955. Source: RSSSF.com
Rules for classification: 1) points; 2) goal difference; 3) wins; 4) number of goals scored.

== Top Scores ==
Rank	Player	Club	Goals
1	Dino da Costa	Botafogo	24
2	Índio	Flamengo	18
3	Javier Ambrois	Fluminense	17
4	Vavá	Vasco da Gama	16
5	Leônidas da Selva	America	15
5	Décio Esteves	Bangu	15
6	Evaristo	Flamengo	14
6	Nívio	Bangu	14
7	Didi	Fluminense	12
