= 1972 Campeonato Carioca =

Campeonato Carioca
- Season: 1972
- Champions: Flamengo
- Campeonato Nacional: Vasco da Gama; Flamengo; Fluminense; América; Botafogo
- Matches played: 125
- Goals scored: 253 (2.02 per match)
- Top goalscorer: Doval (Flamengo) - 16 goals
- Biggest home win: Fluminense 4-0 América (March 12, 1972); Campo Grande 5-1 Bangu (March 15, 1972); Fluminense 4-0 Campo Grande (April 15, 1972); América 4-0 Campo Grande (April 24, 1972)
- Biggest away win: São Cristóvão 1-6 Flamengo (March 4, 1972); Madureira 1-6 América (April 15, 1972); São Cristóvão 0-5 Botafogo (May 6, 1972)
- Highest scoring: São Cristóvão 1-6 Flamengo (March 4, 1972); Madureira 1-6 América (April 15, 1972); Fluminense 2-5 Flamengo (April 23, 1972)

The 1972 edition of the Campeonato Carioca kicked off on February 23, 1972 and ended on September 7, 1972. It was organized by FCF (Federação Carioca de Futebol, or Carioca Football Federation). Twelve teams participated. Flamengo won the title for the 16th time. No teams were relegated.

== System ==
The tournament was divided into four stages:

- Taça Guanabara: The twelve teams all played in a single round-robin format against each other. The champions qualified to the Final phase. The eight best teams qualified to the Second round.
- Taça Fadel Fadel: The remaining eight teams all played in a single round-robin format against each other. The champions qualified to the Final phase.
- Taça José de Albuquerque: The eight teams all played in a single round-robin format against each other. The champions qualified to the Final phase.
- Final phase: The three stage winners played in a single round-robin format against each other. the team with the most points won the title.

== Championship ==
=== Taça Guanabara ===
Pos	Team	Pld	W	D	L	GF	GA	GD	Pts	Qualification or relegation
1	Flamengo	11	9	2	0	23	5	+18	20	Qualified to Final phase
2	Fluminense	11	8	2	1	24	10	+14	18	Qualified
3	Botafogo	11	6	3	2	15	7	+8	15	Qualified
4	Vasco da Gama	11	6	3	2	8	5	+3	15	Qualified
5	América	11	5	4	2	21	10	+11	14	Qualified
6	Olaria	11	4	5	2	13	12	+1	13	Qualified
7	São Cristóvão	11	3	3	5	12	18	−6	9	Qualified
8	Bonsucesso	11	1	6	4	9	10	−1	8	Qualified
9	Campo Grande	11	3	2	6	11	23	−12	8	
10	Portuguesa	11	1	3	7	8	18	−10	5	
11	Bangu	11	2	1	8	9	20	−11	5	
12	Madureira	11	0	2	9	4	19	−15	2	

Updated to match(es) played on April 24, 1972. Source: RSSSF.com
Rules for classification: 1) points; 2) goal difference; 3) wins; 4) number of goals scored.

=== Taça Fadel Fadel ===
Pos	Team	Pld	W	D	L	GF	GA	GD	Pts	Qualification or relegation
1	Fluminense	7	4	2	1	10	5	+5	10	Qualified to Final phase
2	Vasco da Gama	7	2	5	0	8	6	+2	9	
3	Flamengo	7	3	2	2	9	5	+4	8	
4	São Cristóvão	7	3	2	2	7	12	−5	8	
5	Bonsucesso	7	2	3	2	6	7	−1	7	
6	América	7	1	4	2	2	3	−1	6	
7	Botafogo	7	2	1	4	9	8	+1	5	
8	Olaria	7	0	3	4	2	7	−5	3	

Updated to match(es) played on July 23, 1972. Source: RSSSF.com
Rules for classification: 1) points; 2) goal difference; 3) wins; 4) number of goals scored.

=== Taça José de Albuquerque ===
Pos	Team	Pld	W	D	L	GF	GA	GD	Pts	Qualification or relegation
1	Vasco da Gama	7	4	3	0	4	0	+4	11	Qualified to Final phase
2	Botafogo	7	4	2	1	5	2	+3	10	
3	Flamengo	7	3	3	1	8	5	+3	9	
4	América	7	3	2	2	7	3	+4	8	
5	Olaria	7	3	2	2	4	3	+1	8	
6	Bonsucesso	7	3	0	4	5	6	−1	6	
7	Fluminense	7	1	1	5	1	6	−5	3	
8	São Cristóvão	7	0	1	6	3	12	−9	1	

Updated to match(es) played on August 27, 1972. Source: RSSSF.com
Rules for classification: 1) points; 2) goal difference; 3) wins; 4) number of goals scored.

=== Final phase ===
Pos	Team	Pld	W	D	L	GF	GA	GD	Pts	Qualification or relegation
1	Flamengo	2	2	0	0	3	1	+2	4	Champions
2	Fluminense	2	1	0	1	3	2	+1	2	
3	Vasco da Gama	2	0	0	2	0	3	−3	0	

Updated to match(es) played on September 7, 1972. Source: RSSSF.com
Rules for classification: 1) points; 2) goal difference; 3) wins; 4) number of goals scored.
