= Bonsucesso Futebol Clube =

Bonsucesso
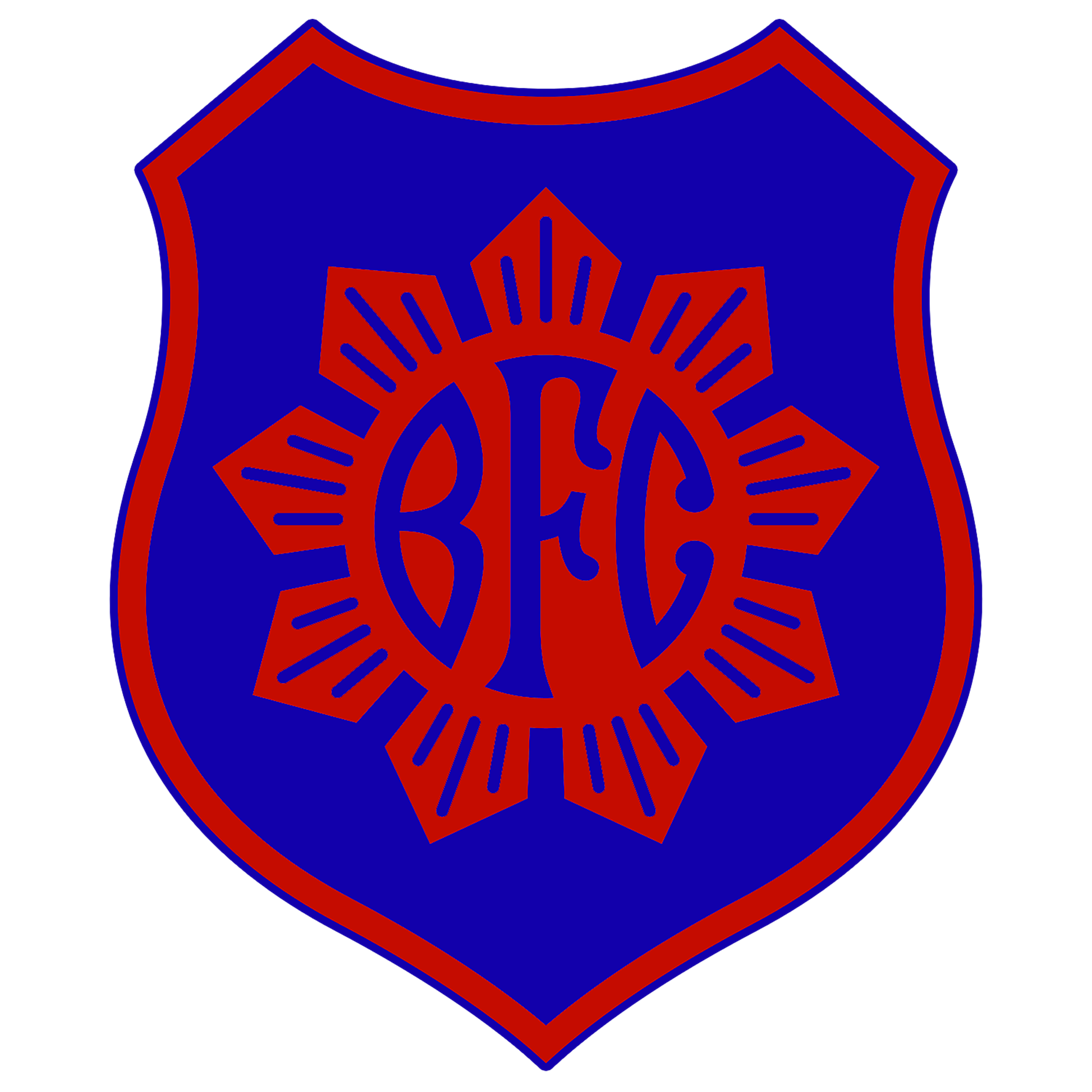
- Full name: Bonsucesso Futebol Clube
- Nicknames: Bonsuça; Rubro-Anil (The Red & Blue); Leão da Leopoldina (The Lion of Zona Leopoldina); Cesso
- Founded: 12 September 1913; 112 years ago
- Ground: Estádio Leônidas da Silva, Rio de Janeiro, Rio de Janeiro state, Brazil
- Capacity: 10,000
- President: José Ferreira Simões
- Head Coach: Luciano Quadros
- League: Campeonato Carioca Série B1
- 2019: Carioca B1, 3rd
Home colors	Away colors

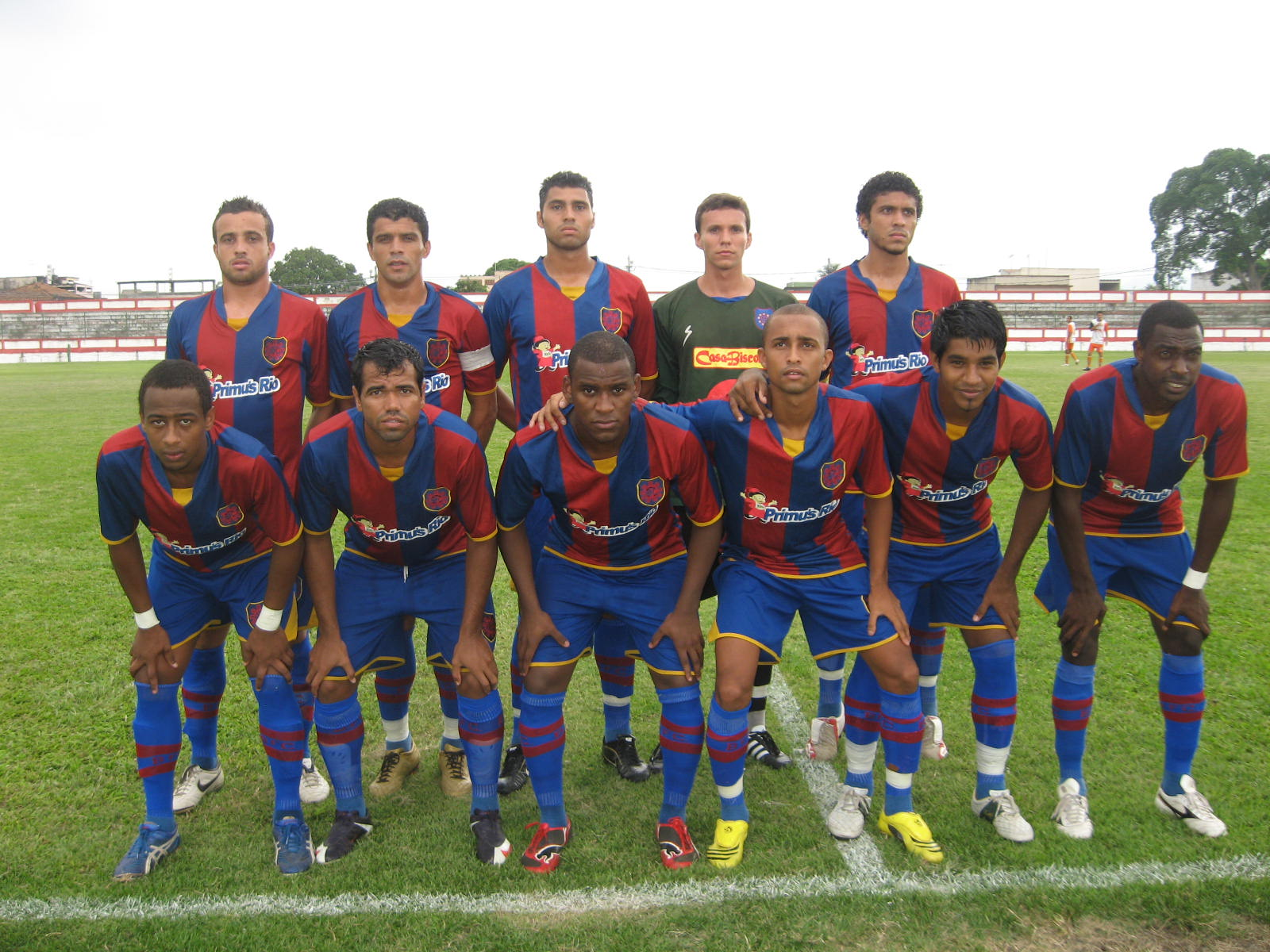
Team photo from the 2009 season

Bonsucesso Futebol Clube, usually abbreviated to Bonsucesso, is a Brazilian football team based in the city of Rio de Janeiro, in the neighbourhood of Bonsucesso. The team compete in Campeonato Carioca Série B1, the second tier of the Rio de Janeiro state football league.

== Former Players ==
(Brazil) Jacksen F. Tiago (1984 - 1999)

== History ==
On August 12, 1913, the club was founded. In 1924, Bonsucesso was LMDT (Liga Metropolitana de Desportos Terrestres)'s Campeonato Carioca's runner-up. The club was defeated by Vasco da Gama in the final. Leônidas da Silva, the Black Diamond, played for Bonsucesso in 1931 and in 1932, coached by Gentil Cardoso who is credited with introducing the WM formation to Brazil. In 1935, Bonsucesso's player named Emiliano Ramos, and nicknamed China was Campeonato Carioca's top scorer with 16 goals.

In 1980, the club competed in the Campeonato Brasileiro Série B, being eliminated in the second stage. In 1983, the club competed again in the Campeonato Brasileiro Série B, being eliminated in the first stage.

== Club kits ==
Bonsucesso's first uniform was blue with red collar and white shorts. In the sixties the team adopted its current uniform with red and blue vertical stripes jerseys and white shorts.

== Stadium ==
Bonsucesso's home stadium is Estádio da Rua Teixeira de Castro, usually known as Estádio Leônidas da Silva, which has a maximum capacity of 10,000 people.

== Rival ==
Bonsucesso's biggest rival is Olaria.

== Honours ==
=== Official tournaments ===
State
Competitions	Titles	Seasons
Copa Rio	1	2019
Campeonato Carioca Série A2	7	1921, 1926, 1927, 1928, 1981, 1984, 2011
Campeonato Carioca Série B1	1	2003

- record

=== Others tournaments ===
==== International ====
- Pentagonal Tournament of Tampico - Mexic (1): 1963

==== National ====
- Torneio Quadrangular de Salvador (1): 1959

==== State ====
- Taça Santos Dumont (1): 2013
- Taça Corcovado (1): 2025

=== Runners-up ===
- Campeonato Carioca (1): 1924
- Campeonato Carioca Série A2 (1): 2013
- Campeonato Carioca Série B1 (2): 1920, 2025
- Campeonato Carioca Série B2 (1): 2024
