= Brazil national football team results (unofficial matches) =

Since their first game in 1914, the Brazil national football team have played numerous matches against opposition whose identity did not fall within that of the standard FIFA international team. Due to the Brazil team’s popularity, they are often sought to play in exhibition matches for commercial reasons (see Brasil Global Tour), by clubs and regional federations celebrating anniversaries or by special select teams such as the World XI. Additionally, Brazil's many participations in official tournaments, primarily the FIFA World Cup, have occasionally involved warm-up matches against local non-international opponents.

== Limited recognition matches against FIFA members ==
Key Win Draw Loss

| 6 Oct 1920 Friendly | Argentina | 3–1 | Brazil | Buenos Aires, Argentina |
| | Raul Etcheverria; Fausto Lucarelli | | Castelhano | Stadium: Estadio Sportivo Barracas; Referee: F. Diez (ARG) |

Protesting against an Argentine newspaper that published a picture of the Brazilian team drawn as monkeys, some players refused to play and the Brazilian team started the match with only seven Brazilian players and completed by four Argentine players (Baigorri, Antonio Rosado, Emilio Solari and Castro). The crowd protested against the Argentine reinforcements in the Brazilian team and the match was finally begun with only seven players in each team.

| 21 Nov 1965 Friendly | Brazil | 5–3 | Hungary | São Paulo, Brazil |
| | Servilio 10', 14'; Lima 19'; Abel 29'; Nair 32' | Report | Bene 44'; Solymosi 80' (pen.); Albert 82' | Stadium: Estádio do Pacaembu; Referee: Eunápio de Queirós (BRA) |

The São Paulo state football team officially represented Brazil national team in this match.

| 26 Apr 1970 Friendly | Brazil | 0–0 | Bulgaria | São Paulo, Brazil |
| | | Report | | Stadium: Estádio do Morumbi; Attendance: 72,790; Referee: Miguel Ángel Comesaña (ARG) |

Bulgaria was represented in this match by a "B" team and due to this the Bulgarian Football Union don't consider this match as official.

| 23 Sep 1981 Friendly | Brazil | 6–0 | Republic of Ireland | Maceió, Brazil |
| | Éder 7'; Roberto Cearense 20'; Zico 70', 71' (pen.), 77', 83' | | | Stadium: Estádio Rei Pelé; Attendance: 36,982; Referee: Oscar Scolfaro (BRA) |

The Football Association of Ireland does not recognize this game as it only used players who played in their local league.

| 31 Jul 1988 Friendly | Sweden | 1–1 | Brazil | Solna, Sweden |
| | Hellström 85' | Report | Jorginho 27' | Stadium: Råsunda Stadium; Attendance: 33.630; Referee: Dieter Pauly (GER) |

Swedish FA don't consider this match as official because considers it was played by the olympic team of Sweden.

| 17 Apr 1991 Friendly | Brazil | 1–0 | Romania | Londrina, Brazil |
| | Moacir 52' | Report | | Stadium: Estádio do Café; Attendance: 37.199; Referee: Renato Marsiglia (BRA) |

The Romanian FF don't consider this match as official. According to Romanian FF, this match was played by their "B" team.

| 27 Sep 1995 Friendly | Brazil | 2–2 | Romania | Belo Horizonte, Brazil |
| | Marques 4'; Sávio 19' | Report | Vasc 18'; Butoiu 25' | Stadium: Mineirão; Attendance: 9.000; Referee: Márcio Rezende de Freitas (BRA) |

The Romanian FF don't consider this match as official. According to Romanian FF, this match was played by their "B" team.

| 22 May 1996 Friendly | Brazil | 1–1 | Croatia | Manaus, Brazil |
| | Sávio 44' | Report | Rapaic 36' | Stadium: Estádio Vivaldo Lima; Attendance: 40,257; Referee: Carlos Elias Pimentel (BRA) |

Although many sources (including the Croatian HNS) consider this match as played by the olympic teams, CBF consider it as played by the Brazilian "A" Team.

| 26 Jun 1996 Friendly | Brazil | 3–1 | Poland | Cariacica, Brazil |
| | Bebeto 34', 85'; Narciso 68' | Report | Dubicki 15' | Stadium: Estádio Engenheiro Araripe; Attendance: 36,700; Referee: José María García-Aranda (ESP) |

Although many sources (including the Polish FA) consider this match as played by the olympic teams, CBF consider it as played by the Brazilian "A" Team.

| 7 Oct 2006 Friendly | Kuwait | 0–4 | Brazil | Kuwait City, Kuwait |
| | | Report | Rafael Sobis 12'; Robinho 35'; Daniel Carvalho 53'; Kaká 78' | Stadium: Al Kuwait Sports Club Stadium; Referee: Paolo Bertini (ITA) |

Friendly in celebration of the 45th anniversary of the foundation of Kuwait SC. Kuwait SC officially represented Kuwait national team in this game.

== Non-FIFA teams and clubs ==
=== 20th century ===
Key Win Draw Loss

==== Pre World War II ====
| 21 Jul 1914 Brazil's first game | Brazil | 2–0 | (England) Exeter City | Rio de Janeiro, Brazil |
| | Oswaldo Gomes 28'; Osman 36' | Report | | Stadium: Laranjeiras; Attendance: 5.000; Referee: Harry Robinson (ENG) |

| 24 Sep 1914 Friendly | Columbian FC (Argentina) | 1–3 | Brazil | Buenos Aires, Argentina |
| | Izaguirre 48' | | Barthô 9', 51'; Friedenreich 27' | Stadium: Estadio G.E.B.A. Referee: J.J. Ritchner (ENG) |

| 7 Jan 1917 Friendly | Brazil | 0–0 | (Uruguay) Dublin FC | Rio de Janeiro, Brazil |
| | | | | Stadium: Voluntários da Pátria; Referee: Lindsay Todd (ENG) |

| 6 May 1917 Friendly | Brazil | 1–1 | (Argentina) Sportivo Barracas | Rio de Janeiro, Brazil |
| | Friedenreich 88' | | Comaschi 1' | Stadium: Rua Paysandu; Referee: Carlos Gardi (ARG) |

| 13 May 1917 Friendly | Brazil | 2–1 | (Argentina) Sportivo Barracas | Rio de Janeiro, Brazil |
| | Arnaldo 22'; Heitor 43' | | Florito 55' | Stadium: Rua Paysandu; Referee: Callisto Fanta (CHI) |

| 27 Jan 1918 Copa Confraternidad | Brazil | 0–1 | (Uruguay) Dublin FC | Rio de Janeiro, Brazil |
| | | | Marán 11' | Stadium: General Severiano; Referee: J. P. Barbera (ARG) |

| 28 Nov 1923 Friendly | Durazno XI (Uruguay) | 0–9 | Brazil | Durazno, Uruguay |
| | | | Zezé; Nilo; Paschoal; Amaro | Stadium: Municipal de Durazno; Referee: Júlian Bertola (URU) |

| 11 Nov 1925 Friendly | Corinthians (Brazil) | 1–1 | Brazil | São Paulo, Brazil |
| | Guido 69' | | Nilo 55' | Stadium: Parque São Jorge; Referee: Francisco Cepedes Guerra (BRA) |

| 20 Dec 1925 Friendly | Newell's Old Boys (Argentina) | 2–2 | Brazil | Rosario, Argentina |
| | Badalini 76', 82' | | Lagarto 14'; Nilo 58' | Stadium: Coloso del Parque; Referee: Ignácio Rota (ARG) |

| 24 Jun 1928 Friendly | Brazil | 5–0 | (Scotland) Motherwell | Rio de Janeiro, Brazil |
| | Feitiço 10', 25', 80', 86'; De Maria 50' | | | Stadium: Laranjeiras; Referee: Luis Vinhães (BRA) |

| 6 Jan 1929 Friendly | Brazil | 5–3 | (Argentina) Sportivo Barracas | Rio de Janeiro, Brazil |
| | Grané 23', 60'; Nilo 32'; Coelho 79'; Feitiço 87' | | Landolfi 20', 42'; Luna 66' | Stadium: São Januário; Referee: Edgard Gonçalves (BRA) |

| 24 Jan 1929 Friendly | Brazil | 4–2 | (Uruguay) Rampla Juniors | Rio de Janeiro, Brazil |
| | Martínez 12' (o.g.); Petronilho de Brito 34'; Serafini 60'; Nilo 78' | | Haerberli 18', 38' | Stadium: São Januário; Referee: Alfonso Castrinho (BRA) |

| 10 Jul 1929 Friendly | Brazil | 2–0 | (Hungary) Ferencváros | Rio de Janeiro, Brazil |
| | Petronilho de Brito 49'; Feitiço 70' | | | Stadium: Laranjeiras; Referee: Moares Castro (BRA) |

| 6 Jul 1931 Friendly | Brazil | 6–1 | (Hungary) Ferencváros | São Paulo, Brazil |
| | Nico 17', 54'; Petronilho de Brito 26', 39'; Del Debbio 63'; De Maria 78' | | Tänzer 9' | Stadium: Parque Antárctica; Referee: Domingos Olmos (BRA) |

| 27 Nov 1932 Friendly | Andarahy AC (Brazil) | 2–7 | Brazil | Rio de Janeiro, Brazil |
| | Palmieri 33', 51' | | Preguinho 12', 17', 34', 62', 79'; Jarbas 36', 48' | Stadium: Laranjeiras; Referee: Leonardo Teixeira (BRA) |

| 8 Dec 1932 Friendly | Peñarol (Uruguay) | 0–1 | Brazil | Montevideo, Uruguay |
| | | | Jarbas 22' | Stadium: Centenario; Referee: Anibal Tejada (URU) |

| 12 Dec 1932 Friendly | Nacional (Uruguay) | 1–2 | Brazil | Montevideo, Uruguay |
| | Fernández 56' | | Wálter 13'; Gradim 25' | Stadium: Centenario; Referee: Anibal Tejada (URU) |

| 6 Jun 1934 Friendly | HŠK Građanski Zagreb (Kingdom of Yugoslavia) | 0–0 | Brazil | Zagreb, Yugoslavia |
| | | | | Stadium: Stadion Maksimir; Referee: Nadelkovski Dossel (BUL) |

| 17 Jun 1934 Friendly | Catalonia | 2–1 | Brazil | Barcelona, Spain |
| | Escolà 20'; Alejandro 48' | Report | Armandinho 74' | Stadium: Camp de Les Corts; Referee: Comorera (ESP) |

| 24 Jun 1934 Friendly | Catalonia | 2–2 | Brazil | Girona, Spain |
| | Adrià Gual; Calvet | Report | Leônidas; Octacílio | Stadium: Estadi Vista Alegre; Referee: Santiago (ESP) |

| 1 Jul 1934 Friendly | Barcelona (Spain) | 4–4 | Brazil | Barcelona, Spain |
| | Alejandro; Chacho; Raich | | Carvalho Leite; Leônidas; Waldemar de Brito | Stadium: Sarrià; Referee: Palayo Serrano (ESP) |

| 12 Jul 1934 Friendly | Lisbon XI (Portugal) | 2–4 | Brazil | Lisbon, Portugal |
| | Xavier ((2)) | | Waldemar de Brito ((2)); Patesko ((2)) | Stadium: Estádio da Luz; Referee: Ilidio Nogueira (POR) |

| 15 Jul 1934 Friendly | Sporting CP (Portugal) | 1–6 | Brazil | Lisbon, Portugal |
| | Soeiro | | Waldemar de Brito; Leônidas; Armandinho; Luisinho | Stadium: Estádio da Luz; Referee: Carlos Napoleão (POR) |

| 22 Jul 1934 Friendly | FC Porto (Portugal) | 0–0 | Brazil | Porto, Portugal |
| | | | | Stadium: Estádio das Antas; Referee: José Travassos (POR) |

| 7 Sep 1934 Friendly | Galícia EC (Brazil) | 4–10 | Brazil | Salvador, Brazil |
| | Vareta 14'; Job 22', 67', 77' | | Armandinho 3', 17', 68', 79'; Waldemar de Brito 7', 11', 27', 33', 52'; Leônidas 81' | Stadium: Estádio da Graça; Referee: Francisco Oliveira Paim (BRA) |

| 9 Sep 1934 Friendly | EC Ypiranga (Brazil) | 1–5 | Brazil | Salvador, Brazil |
| | Ferreira 33' | | Waldemar de Brito 13'; Silveira 28' (pen.); Leônidas 57'; Leite 66'; Patesko 79' | Stadium: Estádio da Graça; Referee: Manoel Rabello (BRA) |

| 13 Sep 1934 Friendly | EC Vitória (Brazil) | 1–2 | Brazil | Salvador, Brazil |
| | Bahianinho 77' | | Waldemar de Brito 22'; Átila 30' | Stadium: Estádio da Graça; Referee: Anísio Silva (BRA) |

| 16 Sep 1934 Taça Interventor Federal | EC Bahia (Brazil) | 1–8 | Brazil | Salvador, Brazil |
| | Cebinho 58' | | Leônidas 4', 7', 16', 87'; Átila 5', 33'; Carvalho Leite 62', 71' | Stadium: Estádio da Graça; Referee: Arnaldo da Silva (BRA) |

| 20 Sep 1934 Taça Dois de Julho | Bahia XI | 1–2 | Brazil | Salvador, Brazil |
| | Ignácio 76' | | Leônidas 31'; Átila 50' | Stadium: Estádio da Graça; Referee: Francisco Oliveira Paim (BRA) |

| 27 Sep 1934 Friendly | Sport Recife (Brazil) | 4–5 | Brazil | Recife, Brazil |
| | Marcílio de Aguiar; Rodolpho | | Armandinho; Leônidas; Patesko | Stadium: Campo da Jaqueira; Referee: José Mariano Carneiro Pessoa (BRA) |

| 30 Sep 1934 Friendly | Santa Cruz FC (Brazil) | 1–3 | Brazil | Recife, Brazil |
| | Tará | | Armandinho; Dondon; Patesko | Stadium: Campo da Jaqueira; Referee: José Fernandes (BRA) |

| 1 Oct 1934 Friendly | Náutico (Brazil) | 3–8 | Brazil | Recife, Brazil |
| | Fernando; João Manoel; Oswaldo | | Leônidas; Carvalho Leite; Armandinho; Silveira | Stadium: Campo da Jaqueira; Referee: Harry Lesser (BRA) |

| 7 Oct 1934 Friendly | Pernambuco XI | 3–5 | Brazil | Recife, Brazil |
| | Bermudes; Marcílio de Aguiar; Valfrido | | Armandinho; Átila; Leônidas; Patesko; Waldemar de Brito | Stadium: Campo da Jaqueira; Referee: José Mariano Carneiro Pessoa (BRA) |

| 10 Oct 1934 Friendly | Santa Cruz FC (Brazil) | 3–2 | Brazil | Recife, Brazil |
| | Zezé; Cidinho | | Patesko; Waldemar de Brito | Stadium: Campo da Jaqueira; Referee: Télio Macedo (BRA) |

| 13 Oct 1934 Friendly | EC Bahia (Brazil) | 1–5 | Brazil | Salvador, Brazil |
| | Ludovico 35' | | Átila 19', 44', 70'; Patesko 26'; Waldemar de Brito 69' | Stadium: Estádio da Graça; Referee: Manoel Rabello (BRA) |

| 16 Dec 1934 Friendly | Palestra Itália (Brazil) | 1–4 | Brazil | São Paulo, Brazil |
| | Romeu 86' | | Leônidas 2', 29'; Armandinho 24'; Waldemar de Brito 46' | Stadium: Parque Antárctica; Referee: Virgílio Fredrigh (BRA) |

| 24 Feb 1935 Friendly | Brazil | 2–1 | (Argentina) River Plate | Rio de Janeiro, Brazil |
| | Nena 32'; Orlando Rosa 67' | | Landoni 17' | Stadium: São Januário; Referee: Miguel Urretaviscaya (ARG) |

==== Post World War II ====
| 6 Jun 1950 Friendly | Brazil | 6–4 | Rio Grande do Sul XI | Rio de Janeiro, Brazil |
| | Ademir; Jair; Zizinho | | Hermes ((4)) | Stadium: São Januário; Referee: Mário Vianna (BRA) |

| 11 Jun 1950 Friendly | Brazil | 4–3 | (São Paulo (state)) São Paulo | Rio de Janeiro, Brazil |
| | Baltazar 29'; Rodrigues 55', 70'; Ademir 81' | Report | Augusto 18'; Brandãozinho 76'; Ponce de León 85' | Stadium: São Januário; Referee: Mário Oliveira (POR) |

| 2 May 1954 Friendly | Brazil | 4–1 | (Colombia) Millonarios | São Paulo, Brazil |
| | Rodrigues ((2)); Índio ((2)) | | Genés | Stadium: Estádio do Pacaembu; Referee: Mário Vianna (BRA) |

| 9 May 1954 Friendly | Brazil | 2–0 | (Colombia) Millonarios | Rio de Janeiro, Brazil |
| | Roberto Martínez (o.g.); Baltazar | | | Stadium: Estádio do Maracanã; Referee: Mário Vianna (BRA) |

| 25 Mar 1956 Friendly | Atlético Mineiro (Brazil) | 0–1 | Brazil | Belo Horizonte, Brazil |
| | | | Álvaro | Stadium: Independência; Referee: Geraldo Toledo (BRA) |

| 1 Apr 1956 Friendly | Pernambuco XI | 0–2 | Brazil | Recife, Brazil |
| | | | Didi; Escurinho | Stadium: Ilha do Retiro; Referee: H. Hardew (FDR) |

| 18 May 1958 Friendly | Corinthians (Brazil) | 0–5 | Brazil | São Paulo, Brazil |
| | | | Garrincha; Pepe; Mazola | Stadium: Pacaembu; Referee: Etzel Filho (BRA) |

| 29 May 1958 Friendly | Fiorentina (Italy) | 0–4 | Brazil | Florence, Italy |
| | | | Mazola; Garrincha; Pepe | Stadium: Artemio Franchi; Referee: Mário Maurelli (ITA) |

| 1 Jun 1958 Friendly | Inter Milan (Italy) | 0–4 | Brazil | Milan, Italy |
| | | | Mazola; Dida; Dino Sani; Zagallo | Stadium: Giuseppe Meazza; Referee: Eric Steiner (AUS) |

| 8 May 1960 Friendly | Malmö FF (Sweden) | 1–7 | Brazil | Malmö, Sweden |
| | Granström | | Pelé; Pepe; Chinesinho; Quarentinha | Stadium: Swedbank Stadion; Referee: Vieldemar Hansen (DEN) |

| 10 May 1960 Friendly | Stævnet / Alliancen (Denmark) | 3–4 | Brazil | Copenhagen, Denmark |
| | H. Nielsen; H. Enoksen | | Quarentinha; Pepe; Chinesinho | Stadium: Københavns Idrætspark; Referee: Eric Johansson (SWE) |

| 12 May 1960 Friendly | Inter Milan (Italy) | 2–2 | Brazil | Milan, Italy |
| | Bicicli; Firmani | | Pelé | Stadium: Giuseppe Meazza; Referee: Daniel Gottfred (SWI) |

| 16 May 1960 Friendly | Sporting CP (Portugal) | 0–4 | Brazil | Lisbon, Portugal |
| | | | Almir; Garrincha; Pepe; Quarentinha | Stadium: Estádio da Luz; Referee: Joaquim Campos (POR) |

| 17 Feb 1962 Friendly | São Paulo FC (Brazil) | 6–2 | Brazil | São Paulo, Brazil |
| | Cido 14', 48'; Célio 21', 87'; Prado 27'; Benê 42' | | Ademar Pantera 30'; Paulinho Ferreira 69' | Stadium: Pacaembu; Referee: Catão Montes Júnior (BRA) |

| 24 May 1962 Friendly | Santiago Wanderers (Chile) | 2–2 | Brazil | Valparaíso, Chile |
| | Hoffmann; Mendéz | | Vavá; Pelé | Stadium: Estadio Chiletabacos |

| 27 May 1962 Friendly | Everton (Chile) | 1–9 | Brazil | Viña del Mar, Chile |
| | Escudero | | Vavá; Pelé; González (o.g.); Zagallo; Amarildo; Coutinho; Jair da Costa | Stadium: Estadio Sausalito |

| 26 Apr 1963 Friendly | Racing Paris (France) | 2–0 | Brazil | Paris, France |
| | Van Sam; Heutte | | | Stadium: Stade Olympique Yves-du-Manoir; Referee: Robert Strum (FRA) |

| 3 May 1963 Friendly | PSV Eindhoven (Netherlands) | 0–1 | Brazil | Eindhoven, Netherlands |
| | | | Coutinho | Stadium: Philips Stadion; Referee: Karel Van der Meer (NED) |

| 22 May 1963 Friendly | Berlin XI (Germany) | 0–3 | Brazil | Berlin, West Germany |
| | | | Quarentinha; Marcos; Amarildo | Stadium: Olympiastadion; Referee: Friedrich Seipelt (AUT) |

| 16 Nov 1965 Friendly | Arsenal (England) | 2–0 | Brazil | London, England |
| | Sammels ((2)) | Report | | Stadium: Highbury Stadium; Referee: H. Phillips (SCO) |

| 1 May 1966 Friendly | Brazil | 2–0 | Rio Grande do Sul XI | Rio de Janeiro, Brazil |
| | Gérson; Servílio | | | Stadium: Maracanã; Referee: Armando Marques (BRA) |

| 21 Jun 1966 Friendly | Atlético Madrid (Spain) | 3–5 | Brazil | Madrid, Spain |
| | Mendonça; Cardona; Aragonés | Report | Pelé ((3)); Amarildo; Lima | Stadium: Santiago Bernabéu; Referee: Armando Marques (BRA) |

| 27 Jun 1966 Friendly | Åtvidabergs FF (Sweden) | 2–8 | Brazil | Åtvidaberg, Sweden |
| | Soderton; Wallinder | Report | Silva Batuta ((3)); Denílson Custódio ((2)); Dino Sani ((2)); Tostão | Stadium: Kopparvallen; Referee: B. Loow (SWE) |

| 4 Jul 1966 Friendly | AIK (Sweden) | 2–4 | Brazil | Stockholm, Sweden |
| | Carlsson; Hamrin | Report | Pelé ((2)); Garrincha; Lima | Stadium: Rasunda; Referee: Armando Marques (BRA) |

| 6 Jul 1966 Friendly | Malmö FF (Sweden) | 1–3 | Brazil | Malmö, Sweden |
| | Manga (o.g.) | Report | Pelé ((2)); Jairzinho | Stadium: Swedbank Stadion; Referee: B. Loow (SWE) |

| 6 Nov 1968 10th anniversary of first World Cup | Brazil | 2–1 | (United Nations) Rest of the World | Rio de Janeiro, Brazil |
| | Rivellino 20'; Tostão 90' | Report | Albert 33' | Stadium: Maracanã; Attendance: 93,000; Referee: Diego De Leo (MEX) |

| 13 Nov 1968 Friendly | Coritiba (Brazil) | 1–2 | Brazil | Curitiba, Brazil |
| | Passarinho | | Dirceu Lopes; Zé Carlos | Stadium: Estádio Couto Pereira; Referee: Armando Marques (BRA) |

| 3 Jul 1969 Friendly | EC Bahia (Brazil) | 0–4 | Brazil | Salvador, Brazil |
| | | | Pelé; Jairzinho; Edu; Tostão | Stadium: Estádio Fonte Nova; Referee: Arnaldo Cézar Coelho (BRA) |

| 9 Jul 1969 Friendly | Sergipe XI | 2–8 | Brazil | Aracaju, Brazil |
| | Vevê; Tática | | Toninho Guerreiro ((3)); Clodoaldo; Paulo Cézar; Gérson; Beto; Paulo Borges | Stadium: Batistão; Referee: Armando Marques (BRA) |

| 13 Jul 1969 Friendly | Pernambuco XI | 1–6 | Brazil | Recife, Brazil |
| | Dema | | Edu ((3)); Jairzinho; Tostão; Pelé | Stadium: Estádio do Arruda; Referee: Armando Marques (BRA) |

| 1 Aug 1969 Friendly | Millonarios (Colombia) | 0–2 | Brazil | Bogotá, Colombia |
| | | | Gérson; Rivellino | Stadium: Estadio El Campín; Referee: Omar Delgado (COL) |

| 3 Sep 1969 Troféu Souza Lima | Minas Gerais | 2–1 | Brazil | Belo Horizonte, Brazil |
| | Amauri 42'; Dario 65' | | Pelé 50' | Stadium: Estadio Mineirão; Attendance: 71.533; Referee: Amílcar Ferreira (BRA) |

| 14 Mar 1970 Friendly | Bangu (Brazil) | 1–1 | Brazil | Rio de Janeiro, Brazil |
| | Paulo Mata | | Moraes (o.g.) | Stadium: Estadio Moça Bonita; Referee: Armando Marques (BRA) |

| 5 Apr 1970 Friendly | Brazil | 4–1 | (Amazonas (Brazilian state)) Amazonas XI | Manaus, Brazil |
| | Carlos Alberto; Paulo Cézar; Rivellino; Pelé | | Mário Vieira | Stadium: Vivaldão; Referee: Airton Vieira de Moraes (BRA) |

| 19 Apr 1970 Friendly | Brazil | 3–1 | Minas Gerais | Belo Horizonte, Brazil |
| | Dario ((2)); Gérson | | Natal | Stadium: Estadio Mineirão; Referee: Armando Marques (BRA) |

| 6 May 1970 Friendly | Guadalajara XI (Mexico) | 0–3 | Brazil | Guadalajara, Mexico |
| | | | Rivellino; Pelé; Clodoaldo | Stadium: Estadio Jalisco; Referee: Arturo Yamazaki (PER) |

| 17 May 1970 Friendly | Club León (Mexico) | 2–5 | Brazil | León, Mexico |
| | Estrada; Marco Antônio (o.g.) | | Pelé; Rivellino; Tostão; Paulo Cézar | Stadium: Estadio León; Referee: Alfonso González Archundia (MEX) |

| 24 May 1970 Friendly | CD Irapuato (Mexico) | 0–3 | Brazil | Irapuato, Mexico |
| | | | Paulo Cézar; Roberto Miranda; Rivellino | Stadium: Estadio Sergio León Chávez; Referee: Javier Galindo (MEX) |

| 10 Jun 1972 Friendly | Brazil | 2–1 | Brazil Olympic | Uberaba, Brazil |
| | Rivellino; Jairzinho | | Zé Carlos | Stadium: Estádio Engenheiro João Guido; Referee: Robert Helies (FRA) |

| 13 Jun 1972 Friendly | Brazil | 2–0 | (Germany) Hamburger SV | Belo Horizonte, Brazil |
| | Rivellino; Gérson | | | Stadium: Estadio Mineirão; Referee: Robert Helies (FRA) |

| 17 Jun 1972 Friendly | Brazil | 3–3 | Rio Grande do Sul XI | Porto Alegre, Brazil |
| | Jairzinho; Paulo Cézar; Rivellino | | Carbone; Claudiomiro | Stadium: Estádio Beira-Rio; Referee: Robert Helies (FRA) |

| 3 Jul 1973 Friendly | Shamrock Rovers XI (Republic of Ireland) (Northern Ireland) | 3–4 | Brazil | Dublin, Republic of Ireland |
| | Martin; Conroy; Dougan | | Paulo Cézar; Jairzinho; Valdomiro | Stadium: Lansdowne Road |

| 19 Dec 1973 Garrincha's Farewell | Brazil | 2–1 | (United Nations) Rest of the World | Rio de Janeiro, Brazil |
| | Pelé 40'; Luís Pereira 65' | Report | Brindisi 2' | Stadium: Maracanã; Attendance: 135,000; Referee: Armando Marques (BRA) |

| 26 May 1974 Friendly | Rhineland-Palatinate XI | 2–3 | Brazil | Ludwigshafen am Rhein, West Germany |
| | Diehl; Pirrung | | Rivellino; Valdomiro | Stadium: Südweststadion; Referee: Otto Riggs (GER) |

| 30 May 1974 Friendly | RC Strasbourg (France) | 1–1 | Brazil | Strasbourg, France |
| | Wagner | | César Maluco | Stadium: Stade de la Meinau; Referee: Georges Konrath (FRA) |

| 3 Jun 1974 Friendly | FC Basel (Switzerland) | 2–5 | Brazil | Basel, Switzerland |
| | Balmer | | Rivellino; Jairzinho; Valdomiro | Stadium: St. Jakob-Park; Referee: Anton Bucheli (SWI) |

| 21 Feb 1976 Friendly | Distrito Federal XI (Federal District (Brazil)) | 0–1 | Brazil | Brasília, Brazil |
| | | | Flecha | Stadium: Mané Garrincha; Referee: Armando Marques (BRA) |

| 28 May 1976 U.S.A. Bicentennial Cup | Team America (United States) | 0–2 | Brazil | Seattle, USA |
| | | | Gil | Stadium: Kingdome; Referee: Ramón Barreto (URU) |

| 2 Jun 1976 Friendly | Pumas UNAM (Mexico) | 3–4 | Brazil | San Francisco, USA |
| | Vergara; Pardo; Cabinho | | Roberto Dinamite; Gil; Zico | Stadium: Candlestick Park; Referee: Henry Landauer (USA) |

| 6 Oct 1976 Taça Geraldo Cleofas | Flamengo (Brazil) | 2–0 | Brazil | Rio de Janeiro, Brazil |
| | Paulinho 5'; Luiz Paulo 11' | Report | | Stadium: Estádio do Maracanã; Attendance: 142,404; Referee: Armando Marques (BRA) |

| 21 Jan 1977 Friendly | Brazil | 2–0 | (São Paulo (state)) São Paulo | São Paulo, Brazil |
| | Gil 31'; Palhinha 64' | Report | | Stadium: Estádio do Morumbi; Referee: Dulcidio Boschilia (BRA) |

| 30 Jan 1977 Friendly | Flamengo / Fluminense (Brazil) | 1–1 | Brazil | Rio de Janeiro, Brazil |
| | Pintinho | | Palhinha | Stadium: Estádio do Maracanã; Referee: José Roberto Wright (BRA) |

| 3 Feb 1977 Friendly | Millonarios (Colombia) | 0–2 | Brazil | Bogotá, Colombia |
| | | | Zico; Roberto Dinamite | Stadium: Estadio El Campín; Referee: Guillermo Velásquez (COL) |

| 3 Mar 1977 Friendly | Vasco da Gama / Botafogo (Brazil) | 1–6 | Brazil | Rio de Janeiro, Brazil |
| | Manfrini | | Roberto Dinamite; Rivellino; Zico; Orlando Pereira; Paulo Cezar; Nílson Dias | Stadium: Estádio do Maracanã; Referee: Armando Marques (BRA) |

| 5 Jun 1977 Friendly | Brazil | 4–2 | (Rio de Janeiro (state)) Rio de Janeiro | Rio de Janeiro, Brazil |
| | Gil 13'; Marcelo Oliveira 19'; Roberto Dinamite 39'; Rivellino 44' | Report | Ramón 69', 76' | Stadium: Estádio do Maracanã; Referee: Airton Vieira de Moraes (BRA) |

| 16 Jun 1977 Friendly | Brazil | 1–1 | (São Paulo (state)) São Paulo | São Paulo, Brazil |
| | Paulo Cézar 4' | Report | Cláudio Mineiro 73' (pen.) | Stadium: Estádio do Morumbi; Referee: José Roberto Wright (BRA) |

| 12 Oct 1977 Friendly | Brazil | 3–0 | (Italy) Milan | Rio de Janeiro, Brazil |
| | Rivellino; Zico; Serginho | | | Stadium: Estádio do Maracanã; Referee: Armando Marques (BRA) |

| 12 Mar 1978 Taça Jornal "O Fluminense" | Brazil | 7–0 | (Rio de Janeiro (state)) Rio de Janeiro XI | Niterói, Brazil |
| | Zico; Nunes; Rivellino | | | Stadium: Estádio Caio Martins; Referee: Luís Carlos Félix (BRA) |

| 19 Mar 1978 Friendly | Brazil | 3–1 | Goiás XI | Goiânia, Brazil |
| | Reinaldo; Zico; Tarciso | | Rinaldo | Stadium: Estádio Serra Dourada; Referee: Airton Vieira de Moraes (BRA) |

| 22 Mar 1978 Friendly | Brazil | 1–0 | (Paraná (state)) Paraná XI | Curitiba, Brazil |
| | Nunes | | | Stadium: Estádio Couto Pereira; Referee: Airton Vieira de Moraes (BRA) |

| 10 Apr 1978 Saudi Crown Prince Trophy | Al-Ahli (Saudi Arabia) | 1–6 | Brazil | Jeddah, Saudi Arabia |
| | Fuad Rizik | | Nunes; Toninho Cerezo; Gil; Mendonça; Toninho Baiano | Stadium: Prince Abdullah Al Faisal Stadium; Referee: Ahmed Al Almozarhan (SAU) |

| 13 Apr 1978 Friendly | Inter Milan (Italy) | 0–2 | Brazil | Milan, Italy |
| | | | Nunes; Dirceu | Stadium: Giuseppe Meazza; Referee: Alberto Michelotti (ITA) |

| 21 Apr 1978 Friendly | Atlético Madrid (Spain) | 0–3 | Brazil | Madrid, Spain |
| | | | Nunes; Edinho; Mendonça | Stadium: Vicente Calderón; Referee: L. Montesino (SPA) |

| 13 May 1978 Friendly | Brazil | 0–0 | Pernambuco XI | Recife, Brazil |
| | | | | Stadium: Estádio do Arruda; Referee: Sebastião Rufino (BRA) |

| 25 May 1978 Friendly | Brazil | 2–2 | Rio Grande do Sul XI | Porto Alegre, Brazil |
| | Toninho Baiano; Nelinho | | Éder; Lúcio | Stadium: Estádio Beira-Rio; Referee: Airton Vieira de Moraes (BRA) |

| 21 Jun 1979 Friendly | Brazil | 5–0 | (Netherlands) Ajax | São Paulo, Brazil |
| | Sócrates; Zico; Toninho Baiano | | | Stadium: Estádio do Morumbi; Referee: José Roberto Wright (BRA) |

| 5 Jul 1979 Friendly | Brazil | 1–1 | Bahia XI | Salvador, Brazil |
| | Juary | | Dendê | Stadium: Estádio Fonte Nova; Referee: Sebastião Rufino (BRA) |

| 2 Apr 1980 Friendly | Brazil | 7–1 | Brazil Youth Team | Rio de Janeiro, Brazil |
| | Reinaldo; Zico; Falcão; Joãozinho; Baltazar | | Robertinho | Stadium: Estádio do Maracanã; Referee: Wilson Carlos dos Santos (BRA) |

| 1 May 1980 Friendly | Brazil | 4–0 | Minas Gerais | Taguatinga, Brazil |
| | Renato; Serginho; Sócrates | | | Stadium: Serejão; Referee: José Mário Vinhas (BRA) |

| 27 Mar 1989 Zico's Farewell | Rest of The World (United Nations) | 2–1 | Brazil | Udine, Italy |
| | Francescoli 34'; Détari 65' | Report | Dunga 5' | Stadium: Stadio Friuli; Referee: Luigi Agnolin (ITA) |

| 29 Mar 1989 Friendly | Al-Ahli (Saudi Arabia) | 1–3 | Brazil | Jeddah, Saudi Arabia |
| | Al Roshod | Report | Bebeto; Washington | Stadium: Prince Abdullah Al Faisal Stadium; Referee: Mohammad Al-Muhaad (SAU) |

| 22 Jun 1989 Friendly | Milan (Italy) | 0–0 | Brazil | Monza, Italy |
| | | Report | | Stadium: Stadio Brianteo; Referee: R. Magui (BEL) |

| 19 May 1990 Friendly | Community of Madrid | 0–1 | Brazil | Madrid, Spain |
| | | Report | Branco 11' | Stadium: Vicente Calderón; Referee: Garcia Aranda (ESP) |

| 28 May 1990 Friendly | Umbria XI | 1–0 | Brazil | Terni, Italy |
| | Artistico 8' | | | Stadium: Libero Liberati; Referee: Sandro Cupeletti (ITA) |

| 31 Oct 1990 Pelé's 50th Birthday | Rest of the World (United Nations) | 2–1 | Brazil | Milan, Italy |
| | Michel 35'; Hagi 49' | Report | Neto 60' | Stadium: San Siro; Referee: Tulio Lanese (ITA) |

| 19 May 1992 Friendly | Milan (Italy) | 0–1 | Brazil | Milan, Italy |
| | | Report | Careca 19' | Stadium: San Siro; Referee: Arcangelo Peazella (ITA) |

| 20 Apr 1994 Friendly | PSG / Bordeaux (France) | 0–0 | Brazil | Paris, France |
| | | Report | | Stadium: Parc des Princes; Referee: Allan Sarder (FRA) |

| 27 Apr 1995 Friendly | Valencia (Spain) | 2–4 | Brazil | Valencia, Spain |
| | Latorre 9'; Fernando 88' (pen.) | Report | Túlio 43', 54', 79'; Juninho 62' | Stadium: Mestalla Stadium; Attendance: 12.000; Referee: Cerda Albert (SPA) |

| 31 May 1998 Athletic Centenary | Athletic Bilbao (Spain) | 1–1 | Brazil | Bilbao, Spain |
| | García 27' | Report | Rivaldo 49' | Stadium: San Mamés; Referee: David Ellaray (ENG) |

| 28 Apr 1999 FC Barcelona Centenary | Barcelona (Spain) | 2–2 | Brazil | Barcelona, Spain |
| | Luis Enrique 34'; Cocu 63' | Report | Ronaldo 29'; Rivaldo 41' | Stadium: Camp Nou; Referee: Juan Ansuategui (ESP) |

=== 21st century ===
| 26 May 2001 Friendly | Tokyo Verdy (Japan) | 0–2 | Brazil | Tokyo, Japan |
| | | Report | Washington 51'; Júlio Baptista 84' | Stadium: National Stadium; Referee: Akira Fuse (JPN) |

| 18 May 2002 Friendly | Catalonia | 1–3 | Brazil | Barcelona, Spain |
| | L. García 62' | Report | Ronaldinho 20', 45'; Edmílson 75' | Stadium: Camp Nou; Referee: Jesus Sanchez (ESP) |

| 25 May 2004 Friendly | Catalonia | 2–5 | Brazil | Barcelona, Spain |
| | Gerard 45'; S. García 89' | Report | Ronaldo 16', 37'; Oliveira 52'; Júlio Baptista 74', 90+1' | Stadium: Camp Nou; Referee: Xavier Delgado (ESP) |

| 6 Sep 2005 Sevilla FC Centenary | Sevilla (Spain) | 1–1 | Brazil | Seville, Spain |
| | Kanouté 16' | Report | Alfaro 84' (o.g.) | Stadium: Ramón Sánchez Pizjuán Stadium; Referee: Ramírez Domingues (ESP) |

| 30 May 2006 Friendly | FC Luzern (Switzerland) | 0–8 | Brazil | Basel, Switzerland |
| | | Report | Kaká 19'; Adriano 37', 85'; Ronaldo 42', 56'; Lúcio 58'; Juninho 68'; Robinho 77' | Stadium: St. Jakob Stadium; Attendance: 31.000; Referee: Claude Circchetta (SUI) |
