= 1925 in Brazilian football =

Football in Brazil
- Season: 1925

The following article presents a summary of the 1925 football (soccer) season in Brazil, which was the 24th season of competitive football in the country.

== Campeonato Paulista ==
Final Standings

| Position | Team | Points | Played | Won | Drawn | Lost | For | Against | Difference |
|---|---|---|---|---|---|---|---|---|---|
| 1 | AA São Bento | 16 | 10 | 8 | 0 | 2 | 24 | 16 | 8 |
| 2 | Corinthians | 15 | 10 | 7 | 1 | 2 | 20 | 7 | 13 |
| 3 | Paulistano | 15 | 10 | 7 | 1 | 2 | 20 | 10 | 10 |
| 4 | Santos | 13 | 10 | 6 | 1 | 3 | 19 | 15 | 4 |
| 5 | Palestra Itália-SP | 11 | 10 | 5 | 1 | 4 | 23 | 16 | 7 |
| 6 | Sírio | 11 | 10 | 5 | 1 | 4 | 23 | 20 | 3 |
| 7 | Portuguesa | 8 | 10 | 4 | 0 | 6 | 14 | 17 | −3 |
| 8 | SC Internacional de São Paulo | 6 | 10 | 3 | 0 | 7 | 15 | 23 | −8 |
| 9 | Germânia | 6 | 10 | 3 | 0 | 7 | 14 | 24 | −10 |
| 10 | Ypiranga-SP | 6 | 10 | 2 | 2 | 6 | 11 | 22 | −9 |
| 11 | Auto-Audax | 3 | 10 | 1 | 1 | 8 | 9 | 24 | −15 |
| 12 | AA das Palmeiras | – | – | – | – | – | – | – | – |

AA das Palmeiras matches were canceled, as the club abandoned the competition.

AA São Bento declared as the Campeonato Paulista champions.

== State championship champions ==
| State | Champion | State | Champion |
|---|---|---|---|
| Amazonas | not disputed | Pernambuco | Sport Recife |
| Bahia | Ypiranga-BA | Rio de Janeiro | Serrano |
| Ceará | Ceará | Rio de Janeiro (DF) | Flamengo |
| Espírito Santo | América-ES | Rio Grande do Norte | Alecrim |
| Maranhão | Luso Brasileiro | Rio Grande do Sul | Bagé |
| Minas Gerais | América-MG | Santa Catarina | Externato |
| Pará | Remo | São Paulo | AA São Bento |
| Paraíba | América-PB | Sergipe | not disputed |
| Paraná | Atlético Paranaense | | |

== Other competition champions ==
| Competition | Champion |
|---|---|
| Campeonato Brasileiro de Seleções Estaduais | Rio de Janeiro (DF) |

== Brazil national team ==
The following table lists all the games played by the Brazil national football team in official competitions and friendly matches during 1925.

| Date | Opposition | Result | Score | Brazil scorers | Competition |
|---|---|---|---|---|---|
| November 11, 1925 | (Brazil) Corinthians | D | 1–1 | Nilo | International Friendly (unofficial match) |
| December 6, 1925 | Paraguay | W | 5–2 | Lagarto, Filó (2), Friedenreich, Nilo | South American Championship |
| December 13, 1925 | Argentina | L | 1–4 | Nilo | South American Championship |
| December 17, 1925 | Paraguay | W | 3–1 | Lagarto (2), Nilo | South American Championship |
| December 20, 1925 | (Argentina) Newell's Old Boys | D | 2–2 | Nilo, Lagarto | International Friendly (unofficial match) |
| December 25, 1925 | Argentina | D | 2–2 | Friedenreich, Nilo | South American Championship |
