= Gustavo Silva =

Gustavo Silva may refer to:

- Gustavo Silva Pizarro (1884–1960), Chilean lawyer, political scientist and mayor
- Gustavo Silva Campo (1885–1959), Chilean lawyer and politician
- Gustavo Silva Conceição (born 1986), Brazilian footballer
- Gustavo Silva (footballer, born 1989), Brazilian footballer
- Gustavo Silva (footballer, born 1997), Brazilian footballer
- Gustavo Henrique Silva (born 1979), Brazilian handball player
- Gustavo Silva (footballer, born 1999), Brazilian footballer
- Gustavo Silva (footballer, born 2002), Brazilian footballer
