= Campeonato Brasileiro de Seleções Estaduais =

Football tournament in Brazil

- Region: Brazil

The Campeonato Brasileiro de Seleções Estaduais was a Brazilian football tournament contested by state teams. It was Brazil's most important football competition until the 1950s. Its last edition was played in 1987, when the CBF tried to revive the competition.

== Winners and goalscorers ==
Year	Winner	Finalist	Top Scorer(s)	Team	Goals
1922	São Paulo	Rio de Janeiro (DF)	Arthur Friedenreich; Neco	São Paulo; São Paulo	8
1923	São Paulo	Rio de Janeiro (DF)	Tatú; Junqueira	São Paulo; Rio de Janeiro (DF)	3
1924	Rio de Janeiro (DF)	São Paulo	Lagarto; Nilo	Rio de Janeiro (DF); Rio de Janeiro (DF)	6
1925	Rio de Janeiro (DF)	São Paulo	Nilo; Manteiga	Rio de Janeiro (DF); Bahia	6
1926	São Paulo	Rio de Janeiro (DF)	Petronilho de Brito	São Paulo	13
1927	Rio de Janeiro (DF)	São Paulo	Nilo	Rio de Janeiro (DF)	12
1928	Rio de Janeiro (DF)	Paraná	Mário Seixas; Stacco	Bahia; Paraná	7
1929	São Paulo	Rio de Janeiro (DF)	Russinho	Rio de Janeiro (DF)	12
1931	Rio de Janeiro (DF)	São Paulo	Oswaldo	Pernambuco team	8
1933	São Paulo (pro, FBF)	Rio de Janeiro (DF)	Waldemar de Brito; Hércules; Canhoto; Said	São Paulo; São Paulo; Minas Gerais	4
1934	São Paulo (pro, FBF)	Rio de Janeiro (DF)	Mendes	São Paulo	7
1934	Bahia (ama, CBD)	São Paulo	?	-	-
1935	Rio de Janeiro (DF) (pro, FBF)	São Paulo	Sá	Rio de Janeiro (DF)	4
1935	Rio de Janeiro (DF) (ama, CBD)	São Paulo	?	-	-
1936	São Paulo (ama, CBD)	Rio Grande do Sul team	?	-	-
1938	Rio de Janeiro (DF)	São Paulo	?	-	-
1939	Rio de Janeiro (DF)	São Paulo	?	-	-
1940	Rio de Janeiro (DF)	São Paulo	?	-	-
1941	São Paulo	Rio de Janeiro (DF)	?	-	-
1942	São Paulo	Rio de Janeiro (DF)	?	-	-
1943	Rio de Janeiro (DF)	São Paulo	?	-	-
1944	Rio de Janeiro (DF)	São Paulo	Tará; Siduca	Pernambuco; Pernambuco	7
1946	Rio de Janeiro (DF)	São Paulo	?	-	-
1950	Rio de Janeiro (DF)	São Paulo	?	-	-
1952	São Paulo	Rio de Janeiro (DF)	?	-	-
1954	São Paulo	Rio de Janeiro (DF)	?	-	-
1956	São Paulo	Rio de Janeiro (DF)	?	-	-
1959	São Paulo	Pernambuco team	?	-	-
1962	Minas Gerais	Guanabara	?	-	-
1987	Rio de Janeiro	São Paulo	?	-	-

=== Notes ===
- Until 1960, Rio de Janeiro city was the Distrito Federal (Federal District). After that year, a new capital was founded, and Rio de Janeiro became the state of Guanabara, its capital and only municipality being Rio de Janeiro city. In 1975, Guanabara and the Rio de Janeiro state, whose capital was Niterói, merged as Rio de Janeiro, with Rio de Janeiro city as the capital.
- Two different Campeonato Brasileiro de Seleções Estaduais editions were contested in 1934. The professional competition was organized by the FBF (Federação Brasileira de Futebol) while the amateur competition was organized by the CBD (Confederação Brasileira de Desportos). São Paulo won the professional competition while Bahia won the amateur one.
- Two different Campeonato Brasileiro de Seleções Estaduais editions were contested in 1935. The professional competition was organized by the FBF (Federação Brasileira de Futebol) while the amateur competition was organized by the CBD (Confederação Brasileira de Desportos). Rio de Janeiro (Distrito Federal) won both competitions.

== Statistics ==
State	Winner	Runner-up	Years won	Years runner-up
Rio de Janeiro (DF)	14	11	1924, 1925, 1927, 1928, 1931, 1935, 1935, 1938, 1939, 1940, 1943, 1944, 1946, 1950	1922, 1923, 1926, 1929, 1933, 1934, 1941, 1942, 1952, 1954, 1956
São Paulo	13	15	1922, 1923, 1926, 1929, 1933, 1934, 1936, 1941, 1942, 1952, 1954, 1956, 1959	1924, 1925, 1927, 1931, 1934, 1935, 1935, 1938, 1939, 1940, 1943, 1944, 1946, 1950, 1987
Bahia	1	0	1934
Minas Gerais	1	0	1962
Rio de Janeiro	1	0	1987
Guanabara	0	1		1962
Paraná	0	1		1928
Pernambuco team	0	1		1959
Rio Grande do Sul team	0	1		1936
