= 2000 Campeonato Mineiro =

Football championship of Minas Gerais, Brazil

Campeonato Mineiro
- Season: 2000
- Dates: 23 January – 8 June
- Champions: Atlético Mineiro
- Relegated: Ipiranga; Valeriodoce
- Matches: 114
- Goals: 328 (2.88 per match)
- Top goalscorer: Ditinho (URT); Joãozinho (Ipatinga); 14 goals
- Highest scoring: Uberlândia 5-3 Ipiranga (30 January 2000)

The 2000 Campeonato Mineiro was the 86th edition of the state championship of Minas Gerais organized by the FMF. The competition began on 23 January and ended on 8 June 2000.

The competition was won by Atlético Mineiro winning their 38th Campeonato Mineiro and their second in a row after winning the 1999 competition. The final consisted of a 2–1 win over Cruzeiro in the first leg followed by a 1–1 draw in the second leg.

== Format ==
=== First stage ===
The 2000 Módulo I first stage was contested by 8 clubs in a double round-robin tournament. The four best-placed teams qualified for the second stage and the bottom two teams were relegated to the 2001 Módulo II. The winner of the first stage is named champion of the Taça Minas Gerais.

=== Second stage ===
The four teams that qualified from the first stage were entered into a second, double round-robin tournament, alongside four teams that received byes from the first stage. The clubs that received first stage byes were: América Mineiro, Atlético Mineiro, Cruzeiro and Villa Nova.

=== Finals ===
The finals were played between the 2 best-placed teams from the second stage in a two-legged tie.

== Participating teams ==
Locations of the 2000 Campeonato Mineiro teams

| Team | Home city | 1999 result |
|---|---|---|
| América Mineiro | Belo Horizonte | 2nd |
| Atlético Mineiro | Belo Horizonte | 1st |
| Caldense | Poços de Caldas | 6th |
| Cruzeiro | Belo Horizonte | 3rd |
| Democrata | Governador Valadares | 5th |
| Ipatinga | Ipatinga | 2nd (Módulo II) |
| Ipiranga | Manhuaçu | 9th |
| Rio Branco | Andradas | 10th |
| Uberlândia | Uberlândia | 1st (Módulo II) |
| URT | Patos de Minas | 7th |
| Valeriodoce | Itabira | 8th |
| Villa Nova | Nova Lima | 4th |

== First stage ==
| Pos | Team | Pld | W | D | L | GF | GA | GD | Pts | Qualification or relegation | URT | IPA | DEM | RIO | UBE | CAL | IPI | VAL |
|---|---|---|---|---|---|---|---|---|---|---|---|---|---|---|---|---|---|---|
| 1 | URT (Note: Champions of the Taça Minas Gerais) (Q) | 14 | 8 | 3 | 3 | 24 | 17 | +7 | 27 | Qualified for Second Stage | — | 1–0 | 1–3 | 2–1 | 2–1 | 1–1 | 3–2 | 2–0 |
| 2 | Ipatinga (Q) | 14 | 7 | 3 | 4 | 22 | 17 | +5 | 24 | Qualified for Second Stage | 3–2 | — | 1–3 | 3–1 | 3–0 | 2–1 | 3–0 | 1–1 |
| 3 | Democrata (Q) | 14 | 7 | 2 | 5 | 24 | 17 | +7 | 23 | Qualified for Second Stage | 0–3 | 3–0 | — | 0–1 | 0–0 | 2–2 | 2–1 | 2–1 |
| 4 | Rio Branco (Q) | 14 | 7 | 2 | 5 | 20 | 16 | +4 | 23 | Qualified for Second Stage | 1–1 | 0–0 | 2–1 | — | 2–1 | 0–1 | 2–1 | 3–0 |
| 5 | Uberlândia | 14 | 6 | 4 | 4 | 21 | 21 | 0 | 22 | | 1–0 | 1–0 | 3–2 | 1–4 | — | 2–0 | 5–3 | 0–0 |
| 6 | Caldense | 14 | 5 | 5 | 4 | 16 | 15 | +1 | 20 | | 0–1 | 2–3 | 1–0 | 1–0 | 1–1 | — | 0–0 | 2–0 |
| 7 | Ipiranga (R) | 14 | 1 | 5 | 8 | 20 | 29 | −9 | 8 | 2001 Módulo II | 3–3 | 1–1 | 0–1 | 4–2 | 3–3 | 1–2 | — | 1–1 |
| 8 | Valeriodoce (R) | 14 | 1 | 4 | 9 | 10 | 25 | −15 | 7 | 2001 Módulo II | 1–2 | 1–2 | 1–5 | 0–1 | 1–2 | 2–2 | 1–0 | — |

Source: Futebol Nacional
(Q) Qualified for the phase indicated; (R) Relegated

== Second stage ==
| Pos | Team | Pld | W | D | L | GF | GA | GD | Pts | Qualification or relegation | ATM | CRU | AME | IPA | VIL | RIO | URT | DEM |
|---|---|---|---|---|---|---|---|---|---|---|---|---|---|---|---|---|---|---|
| 1 | Atlético Mineiro (Q) | 14 | 10 | 2 | 2 | 33 | 20 | +13 | 32 | Qualified for Finals | — | 4–2 | 2–3 | 2–1 | 3–1 | 3–1 | 1–1 | 2–2 |
| 2 | Cruzeiro (Q) | 14 | 9 | 4 | 1 | 26 | 10 | +16 | 31 | Qualified for Finals | 2–0 | — | 1–0 | 2–0 | 1–1 | 2–0 | 2–0 | 2–1 |
| 3 | América Mineiro | 14 | 5 | 6 | 3 | 20 | 14 | +6 | 21 | | 1–2 | 1–1 | — | 1–0 | 1–1 | 1–2 | 2–2 | 3–0 |
| 4 | Ipatinga | 14 | 5 | 4 | 5 | 18 | 18 | 0 | 19 | | 1–4 | 0–1 | 2–2 | — | 1–1 | 0–0 | 4–2 | 4–1 |
| 5 | Villa Nova | 14 | 4 | 6 | 4 | 19 | 19 | 0 | 18 | | 0–1 | 1–1 | 0–0 | 1–1 | — | 4–2 | 2–0 | 3–1 |
| 6 | Rio Branco | 14 | 5 | 2 | 7 | 17 | 22 | −5 | 17 | | 2–3 | 1–1 | 1–2 | 0–1 | 1–0 | — | 1–0 | 3–1 |
| 7 | URT | 14 | 2 | 3 | 9 | 14 | 26 | −12 | 9 | | 1–3 | 0–4 | 0–0 | 1–2 | 1–2 | 3–0 | — | 0–1 |
| 8 | Democrata | 14 | 2 | 1 | 11 | 18 | 36 | −18 | 7 | | 2–3 | 1–4 | 0–3 | 0–1 | 5–2 | 1–3 | 2–3 | — |

Source: Futebol Nacional
(Q) Qualified for the phase indicated

== Finals ==
3 June 2000

| Cruzeiro | 1–2 | Atlético Mineiro |
|---|---|---|
| Geovanni 89' | | Marques 24'; Guilherme 57' |

Mineirão, Belo Horizonte
Attendance: 4,146

8 June 2000

| Atlético Mineiro | 1–1 | Cruzeiro |
|---|---|---|
| Ramon 28' | | Fábio Júnior 84' |

Mineirão, Belo Horizonte
Attendance: 19,853
Referee: Oscar Roberto de Godói

Atlético Mineiro win 3–2 on aggregate

Campeonato Mineiro
2000 champion

Atlético
38th title
