= Minas Gerais state football team =

Unofficial national football team representing the Minas Gerais state

Minas Gerais
- Nickname: Seleção Mineira
- Association: Federação Mineira de Futebol
- Confederation: CBF
- Top scorer: Bernardino; Lucas; Mário de Castro; Murilinho (12)
- Home stadium: Estádio Mineirão
First colours	Second colours

First international
- Minas Gerais 1–7 Riachuelo (Belo Horizonte, Brazil; 9 September 1910)

Biggest win
- Minas Gerais 13–0 Maranhão (Rio de Janeiro, Brazil; 13 October 1927)

Biggest defeat
- Rio de Janeiro 15–0 Minas Gerais (Rio de Janeiro, Brazil; 14 July 1920)

The Minas Gerais state football team (Portuguese: Seleção Mineira de Futebol) represents Minas Gerais in association football.

== Players ==
Following is the information about the players who appeared for the Minas Gerais state team:

=== Notable players ===
- Belletti
- Dadá Maravilha
- Danival
- Dirceu Lopes
- Éder Luís
- Lincoln
- Nelinho
- Piazza
- Raul Plassmann
- Reinaldo
- Tostão

== Managers ==
These are all the managers who as headed Minas Gerais state team:

- (Uruguay) Darío Pereyra (1999)
- Ney Franco (2006)

== Honours ==
- Campeonato Brasileiro de Seleções Estaduais:
  - Winners: 1962
- Troféu Prefeito Souza Lima: (vs. Brazil)
  - Winners: 1969
- Taça Gastão Soares de Moura: (vs. Rio de Janeiro)
  - Winners: 1975

== Fixtures and results ==
=== 21st century ===
The Minas Gerais state team played only one match in the XXI century:

8 Apr 2006 Friendly	Minas Gerais	0–1	(Brazil) Cruzeiro	Sete Lagoas
		Report	Luizinho 22'	Stadium: Arena do Jacaré; Referee: Álvaro Azeredo Quelhas

== Last squad ==
The following players were called up for the friendly match against Cruzeiro, on April 8, 2006.

No.	Pos.	Player	Date of birth (age)	Caps	Goals	Club
	GK	Glaysson	1 March 1979 (aged 27)	1	0	(Brazilian Football Confederation) Democrata-SL
	GK	Fernando Leal	24 October 1981 (aged 24)	1	0	(Brazilian Football Confederation) Democrata-GV
	DF	Filhão	4 December 1982 (aged 23)	1	0	(Brazilian Football Confederation) Ituiutaba
	DF	Wellington Paulo	1 December 1972 (aged 33)	1	0	(Brazilian Football Confederation) América Mineiro
	DF	João Carlos	10 September 1972 (aged 33)	1	0	(Brazilian Football Confederation) Ipatinga
	DF	Micão	7 February 1980 (aged 26)	1	0	(Brazilian Football Confederation) Guarani de Divinópolis
	DF	Alemão	14 August 1981 (aged 24)	1	0	(Brazilian Football Confederation) Ipatinga
	MF	Márcio Diogo	22 September 1985 (aged 20)	1	0	(Brazilian Football Confederation) Ipatinga
	MF	Fabrício	14 September 1978 (aged 27)	0	0	(Brazilian Football Confederation) América Mineiro
	MF	Ramon	30 June 1972 (aged 33)	1	0	(Brazilian Football Confederation) Atlético Mineiro
	FW	Ditinho	21 March 1972 (aged 34)	2	0	(Brazilian Football Confederation) URT
	FW	Éder Luís	19 April 1985 (aged 20)	1	0	(Brazilian Football Confederation) Atlético Mineiro
	FW	Washington	3 January 1972 (aged 34)	1	0	(Brazilian Football Confederation) América Mineiro

== Head-to-head record ==
Below is a result summary of all matches Minas Gerais have played against another Brazilian state teams, FIFA national teams and clubs.

Positive Record Neutral Record Negative Record

=== State teams (non-FIFA) ===
Opponent	Pld	W	D	L	GF	GA	GD
Bahia	6	3	2	1	8	7	+1
Ceará	3	3	0	0	9	3	+6
(Federal District (Brazil)) Distrito Federal	1	0	1	0	0	0	0
Espírito Santo	6	5	0	1	20	7	+13
Goiás	6	5	1	0	23	3	+20
Maranhão	3	2	0	1	25	11	+14
Mato Grosso	4	3	1	0	22	4	+18
Pará	2	1	1	0	4	3	+1
(Paraná (state)) Paraná	3	3	0	0	16	3	+13
Pernambuco	9	3	2	4	14	14	0
(Rio de Janeiro (state)) Rio de Janeiro	46	9	8	29	66	164	-98
(Rio de Janeiro (state)) Rio de Janeiro (Countryside)	22	14	2	6	62	37	+25
Rio Grande do Sul	4	0	1	3	5	12	-7
(Santa Catarina (state)) Santa Catarina	2	1	1	0	3	2	+1
(São Paulo (state)) São Paulo	16	3	2	11	21	53	-32
Sergipe	1	1	0	0	3	1	+2
Total (16)	134	56	22	56	301	324	-23

=== National teams (FIFA) ===
Opponent	Pld	W	D	L	GF	GA	GD
Argentina	1	1	0	0	3	2	+1
Brazil	3	1	0	2	3	8	-5
Brazil Olympic	1	0	0	1	0	2	-2
Chile	1	1	0	0	3	2	+1
Czechoslovakia	2	0	1	1	1	3	-2
Soviet Union	1	0	1	0	0	0	0
Total (6)	9	3	2	4	10	17	-7
