= 1925 South American Championship =

Football tournament

Tournament details
- Host country: Argentina
- Dates: 29 November – 25 December
- Teams: 3 (from 1 confederation)
- Venues: 2 (in 1 host city)

Final positions
- Champions: Argentina (2nd title)
- Runners-up: Brazil
- Third place: Paraguay

Tournament statistics
- Matches played: 6
- Goals scored: 26 (4.33 per match)
- Top scorer(s): (Argentina) Manuel Seoane (6 goals)

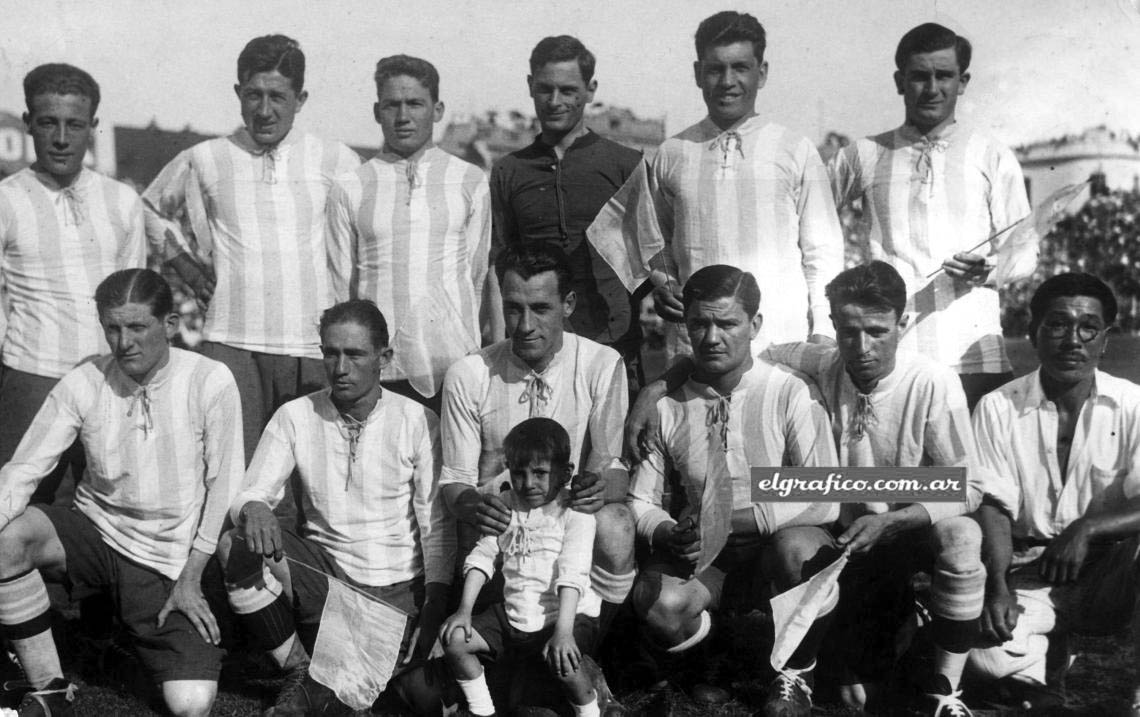
The Argentina squad (here pictured in the first match v Paraguay) won its second title

The ninth South American Championship was held in Buenos Aires, Argentina from 29 November to 25 December 1925.

In 1925, the participating countries were Argentina, Brazil, and Paraguay. Chile and Uruguay withdrew from the tournament, making this event the one with the fewest participating teams. The tournament was rescheduled to be held in two rounds.

Argentina won its second continental title.

== Squads ==
For a complete list of participants squads see: 1925 South American Championship squads

== Venues ==
Buenos Aires
Sportivo Barracas Stadium	Boca Juniors Stadium
Capacity: 30,000	Capacity: 25,000
1925 South American Championship is located in Argentina

== Final round ==
Each team played two matches against each of the other teams. Two points were awarded for a win, one point for a draw, and zero points for a defeat.

Team	Pld	W	D	L	GF	GA	GD	Pts
Argentina	4	3	1	0	11	4	+7	7
Brazil	4	2	1	1	11	9	+2	5
Paraguay	4	0	0	4	4	13	−9	0

29 November 1925

Argentina	2–0	Paraguay
Seoane 2'; Sánchez 72'

Boca Juniors Stadium, Buenos Aires
Referee: Ricardo Vallarino (Uruguay)

6 December 1925

Brazil	5–2	Paraguay
Filo 16'; Friedenreich 18'; Lagarto 30', 52'; Nilo 72'		Rivas 25', 55'

Sportivo Barracas Stadium, Buenos Aires
Referee: Gerónimo Rapossi (Argentina)

13 December 1925

Argentina	4–1	Brazil
Seoane 41', 48', 74'; Garasini 72'		Nilo 22'

Sportivo Barracas Stadium, Buenos Aires
Referee: Manuel Chaparro (Paraguay)

17 December 1925

Paraguay	1–3	Brazil
Fretes 58'		Nilo 30'; Lagarto 57', 61'

Boca Juniors Stadium, Buenos Aires
Referee: Gerónimo Rapossi (Argentina)

20 December 1925

Paraguay	1–3	Argentina
Fleitas Solich 15'		Tarasconi 22'; Seoane 32'; Irurieta 63'

Boca Juniors Stadium, Buenos Aires
Referee: Joaquim Antônio Leite de Castro (Brazil)

25 December 1925

Brazil	2–2	Argentina
Friedenreich 27'; Nilo 30'		Cerroti 41'; Seoane 55'

Boca Juniors Stadium, Buenos Aires
Referee: Manuel Chaparro (Paraguay)

== Result ==
1925 South American Championship champions

Argentina
Second title

== Goal scorers ==
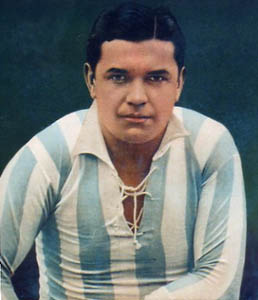
Manuel Seoane, top scorer

6 goals

- (Argentina) Manuel Seoane

4 goals

- (Brazil) Lagarto
- (Brazil) Nilo

2 goals

- (Brazil) Arthur Friedenreich
- (Paraguay) Gerardo Rivas

1 goal

- (Argentina) Antonio Cerrotti
- (Argentina) Alfredo Garasini
- (Argentina) Juan C. Irurieta
- (Argentina) Martín Sánchez
- (Argentina) Domingo Tarasconi
- (Brazil) Filo
- (Paraguay) Manuel Fleitas Solich
- (Paraguay) Luis Fretes

== Aftermath ==
Despite having won the tournament unbeaten, part of the Argentine media considered the team's performance as "poor", highlighting that Argentina was the winner only because of being stronger than the other two participants. Argentine magazine El Gráfico stated Argentina's virtues were decreasing as the competition went by, with such notable failures.

Centre forward Juan Carlos Irurieta was injured in the first match, being replaced by Manuel Seoane, who did not play as good as he used to be because of his change of position (from left insider to centre forward). The media criticised hardly the performances of Garasini, Alejandro de los Santos, Antonio Cerrotti and Juan Bianchi. On the other hand, Domingo Tarasconi, Seoane and Martín Sánchez were mentioned as the most remarkable players. In the case of Tarasconi, his efficient dribbling, passing style and accurate corner kicks were widely praised. Seoane's goalscoring prowess was also mentioned as one of the high points of Argentina, setting a record with six goals in four matches. Nevertheless, Seoane was also criticised for being out of shape due to his overweight.

Another Argentine player harshly criticised was goalkeeper Américo Tesoriere:

(Tesoriere) is not the "magician of the goal" that we admired so much due to his security, courage, cold blood, surprising agility and unsurpassed sense of location. Although the rival did not attack so much, he conceded four goals, which were not hard-to-stop shots. Apart from the goals received, Tesoriere's showed himself insecure and slow, which could have been worse. Undoubtedly, we don't mean that his performance was disastrous, but we do want to set he is having a tough time in his sports career either his debacle is approaching...

— El Gráfico, about Américo Tesoriere's performance at the South American Championship
