= 1919 South American Championship play-off =

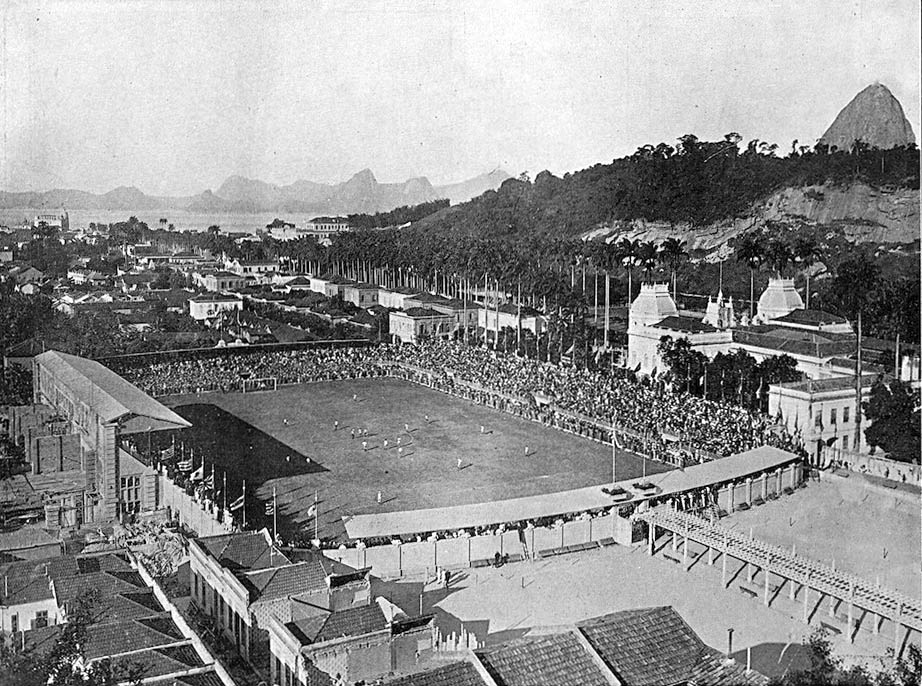
- Estádio das Laranjeiras, venue of the match
- Event: 1919 South American Championship
Brazil	Uruguay
1	0
- Date: May 29, 1919
- Venue: Estádio das Laranjeiras, Rio de Janeiro
- Referee: Juan P. Barbera (Argentina)

The 1919 South American Championship play-off was a match held to determine the winner of the 1919 South American Championship, the third edition of this continental championship, as Brazil and Uruguay were tied for the first place after the regular competition. The match took place on May 29, 1919, at Estádio das Laranjeiras in Rio de Janeiro.

Brazil won 1–0 after two extra time periods of two 30-minute halves each. This meant the match lasted 150 minutes, the longest in the tournament's history, while Brazil won its first continental title.

== Background ==
Brazil
Round
Uruguay
Opponent
Result
Group stage
Opponent
Result
Chile
6–0
Match 1
Argentina
3–2

Argentina
3–1
Match 2
Chile
2–0

Uruguay
2–2
Match 3
Brazil
2–2

Team	Pld	W	D	L	GF	GA	GD	Pts
Brazil	3	2	1	0	11	3	+8	5
Uruguay	3	2	1	0	7	4	+3	5
Argentina	3	1	0	2	7	7	0	2
Chile	3	0	0	3	1	12	−11	0

Notes

- Brazil and Uruguay finished tied on points so a playoff match had to be played to decide a champion.

== Overview ==
The tournament system consisted of a single round-robin tournament, where the team with most points was crowned champion: however, Brazil and Uruguay finished tied on points, meaning a play-off was required.

It was also the first time that a non-CONMEBOL referee (Robert L. Todd of England) was appointed to a CONMEBOL match.

After the match finished 0–0, both captains and Todd agreed to play an extra time period of two 15-minute halves. When 120 minutes expired with the score still tied 0-0, both captains and Todd agreed to play a second extra time period of two 15-minute halves, meaning the final lasted 150 minutes.

This was the longest football match ever in Copa América history, while Arthur Friedenreich scored the goal that allowed Brazil to win its first international title in the 122nd minute, the latest goal in Copa América history; under current rules, both records will stand indefinitely.

== Match details ==
May 29, 1919

Brazil	1–0 (a.e.t.)	Uruguay
Friedenreich 122'

Estádio das Laranjeiras, Rio de Janeiro
Referee: Juan Pedro Barbera (Argentina)

Brazil	Uruguay

GK	Marcos
RB	Pindaro
LB	Bianco
RH	Sérgio
CH	Fortes
LH	Amílcar
OR	Millon
IR	Neco
CF	Friedenreich
IL	Heitor Dominguez
OL	Arnaldo
Manager:
Haroldo

GK	Cayetano Saporiti
RB	Manuel Varela
LB	Alfredo Foglino
RH	Rogelio Naguil
CH	Alfredo Zibechi
LH	José Vanzzino
OR	José Pérez
IR	Héctor Scarone
CF	Ángel Romano
IL	Isabelino Gradín
OL	Rodolfo Marán
Manager:
Severino Castillo

== Aftermath ==
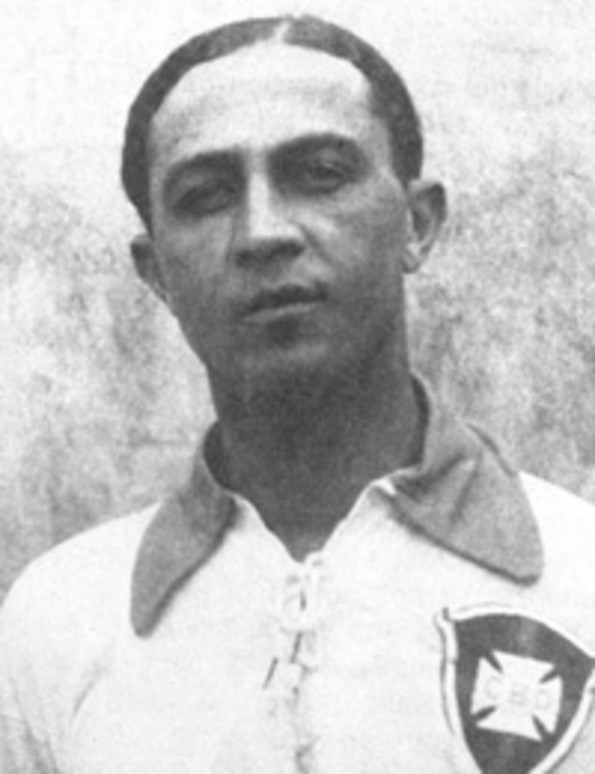
Arthur Friedenreich scored the goal for Brazil, being also the topscorer of the tournament with 4 goals

Friedenreich's goal had a huge impact in Brazil due to the fact that him was the first black men to have played football in that country. He was also the first black to be called for the national team. Although only better-off sectors in Brazilian society could play football by then, the Federation allowed Friedenreich to play due to his father was a German-native, who had played in SC Germânia, a Paulist club established by German immigrants.

Friedenreich was not only the first black men to play football in Brazil, he is considered the first black superstar of the sport, with more than 1,200 goals credited to him within 25 years of career.

After this victory, racism in Brazilian football started to drop, with several clubs, including black people in their squads and even the national team. The championship also contributed to increase the popularity of the sport in the country.

Nevertheless, President of Brazil, Epitácio Pessoa, banned black players from the national team so Friedenreich could not attend the 1920 and 1921 editions in Chile and Argentina respectively. After the failures in those tournaments and popular pressure, Pessoa had to lift the ban and Friedenreich (considered the best Brazilian player) could return to the team. Brazil could win its second South American title in 1922 although Friedenreich can only play two matches before being injured.
