= Arthur Friedenreich =

Brazilian footballer (1892–1969)

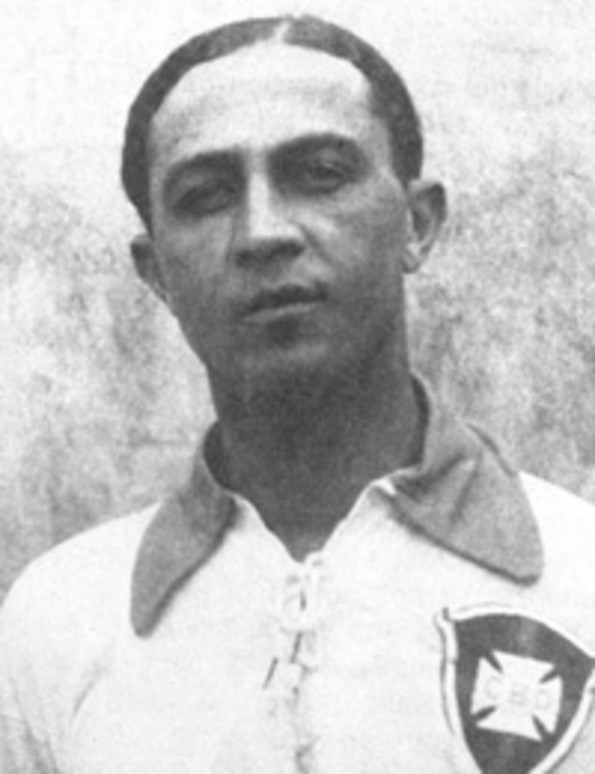
- Friedenreich with Brazil

Personal information
- Date of birth: 18 July 1892
- Place of birth: São Paulo, Brazil
- Date of death: 6 September 1969 (aged 77)
- Place of death: São Paulo, Brazil
- Height: 1.70 m (5 ft 7 in)
- Position: Forward

Senior career*
Years	Team	Apps	(Gls)
1910	Ypiranga	1	(0)
1911	Germânia	9	(4)
1912	Mackenzie College	10	(15)
1913–1917	Ypiranga	32	(37)
1917–1929	Paulistano	185	(230)
1930–1935	São Paulo	79	(69)
Total		317	(355)

International career
1914–1925	Brazil	17	(8)
Medal record
Men's football
Representing Brazil
South American Championship
Winner	1919 Brazil
Winner	1922 Brazil
Runner-up	1925 Argentina
Third place	1916 Argentina
- * Club domestic league appearances and goals

Arthur Friedenreich (18 July 1892 – 6 September 1969) was a Brazilian professional footballer who played as a forward. He was nicknamed The Tiger or Golden Foot. He played for the Brazil national team and was a record nine times top scorer of the state championship of São Paulo. He is occasionally cited as one of the all-time top scorers in football history, although this is highly disputed.

== Early and personal life ==
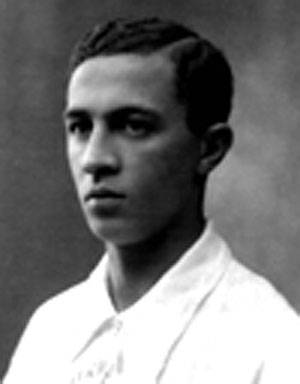
Young Friedenreich

Friedenreich was born in São Paulo to Oscar Friedenreich, a German businessman whose father immigrated to Brazil, and Mathilde, a Black Brazilian teacher who has been described in various sources as both a former slave and a teacher. Due to his Afro-Brazilian origin, Friedenreich faced racial discrimination, though he was able to mitigate some of its effects thanks to his father's reputation and social standing.

Friedenreich began playing football in early childhood, with strong support from his father, who helped shape his path to greatness. Having started to play as a child, Friedenreich's talent was soon noticed by his father, who sent him to play for SC Germânia, a Brazilian football team composed of German immigrants. During his youth, he improved his skills by watching Charles Miller, who Friedenreich later described as "sort of my primary teacher in football", but it was with Hermann Friese, a former German football champion, who taught him a "higher level of football". At some point, Friedenreich married his wife, Jonas, and they had a son named Oscar, after Friedenreich’s father. Both outlived him, being left in financial hardship.

== Club career ==
=== Golden years ===
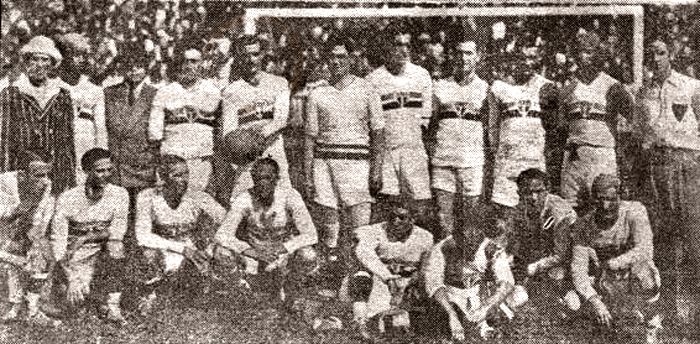
SPFC squad featuring Friedenreich in 1931

In his early career, Friedenreich played with several clubs, such as Germânia, Mackenzie, and Ypiranga, until he found a long-lasting home with CA Paulistano, a top Brazilian club, with whom he played for 12 years, from 1917 until 1929, when the club was disbanded. He was the top scorer in the Campeonato Paulista in 1912, 1914, 1917, 1918, 1919, 1921, 1927 and 1929. In total, he scored 102 goals in 124 official matches, which results in a ratio of 0,82 goals per game, the second-highest among players with at least 50 matches for the club, only behind Waldemar de Brito's ratio of 1,09. Notably, on 16 September 1928, he scored a 7-goal haul in a 9–0 trashing of União Lapa, breaking the record for the most goals in a single Campeonato Paulista match at the time.

Following the collapse of the amateur football system in São Paulo in 1929, Friedenreich and several former teammates from CA Paulistano founded the club São Paulo da Floresta (SPF) in 1930 to continue their careers in the changing football landscape. In the mid-time, in early 1930, he briefly played for Santos, appearing in a total of 5 matches, making his debut on 9 February, in a friendly against Atlético Tucumán, which ended in a 4–1 win. On 27 December 1931, he scored a four-goal haul to help São Paulo to a 4–2 win over São Bento in the 1931 Campeonato Paulista, becoming, at the age of 39 years and 162 days, the oldest player ever to score a poker-trick, a record that has since been broken by Josef Bican in 1955, aged 41. Like so many other natives of São Paulo, he enlisted in the São Paulo Army to fight in the Paulista War in 1932, where he rose from sergeant to lieutenant, commanding a division with several athletes.

=== Later career ===
On 12 March 1933, the 40-year-old Friedenreich started for SPF in the first professional football match in São Paulo, where Friedenreich scored the opening goal in a 4–1 win over his former club Santos. As he grew older, he began to play less and less, only when São Paulo required his assistance, so he began refereeing matches, doing so with a shirt that the Paulista club had offered him, which was a white uniform with a "P" embroidered on the chest, right above the years "1918-1928", a reference to the time he spent at the club. Likewise, on 5 November 1933, he visited Belo Horizonte to referee a friendly match between Atlético Mineiro and Retiro-MG (Nova Lima); his performance was praised by the local press, with the Estado de Minas stating that "Fried stopped calling penalties", while the Correio Mineiro described him as a "correct referee characterized by the strictest discipline". Taking advantage of his visit, Atlético invented him to play one match for them, a friendly against Siderúrgica three days later, which he accepted because he was friends with the team's coach; Atlético won 3–0. Correio Mineiro stated that he "led his players excellently with mathematical passes".

The adjectives that you see in the newspapers, such as "the consecrated champion", "El Tigre", "the greatest "crack" of all time", and many others, still do not say everything that can be said about Friedenreich.

— Sylvio Lagreca on 4 July 1934, on the eve of Friedenreich's sporting jubilee.

On 5 July 1934, the Brazilian Football Federation (CBF) helped sponsor and organize the commemorative program of Friedenreich's sporting jubilee (25-year career) in Brasília, which consisted, among other things, of two matches between São Paulo and Rio de Janeiro. On the eve of this occasion, his former teammate Sylvio Lagreca stated that he was "the greatest center forward we ever had", describing him as a footballer who "played more with his intelligence than with his feet, and therefore adapted to all the positions in which he was placed without saying a word". Friedenreich played his last match for SPF on 24 March 1935, aged 42. In that same year, he returned to Flamengo, for whom he had already played in 1917, and where he retired after refusing a contract renewal.

According to the IFFHS, Friedenreich scored a total of 357 goals in Brazil's three strongest leagues (National, Carioca, Paulista), which makes him the fifth highest goalscorer in that criteria, only behind Zico (374), Romário (387), Roberto Dinamite (474), and Pelé (567). All of those 357 goals were scored at Campeonato Paulista, where he still is the second-highest goalscorer, only behind Pelé, who surpassed by more over a century of goals (466).

== International career ==
=== Brazil ===
Friedenreich made his debut for the Brazilian national team in their first-ever official match in 1914, beating Exeter City 2–0. In the game, Friedenreich lost two of his front teeth due to a heavy slide tackle. He went to play 17 matches with Brazil, scoring 8 goals and winning the South American Championship in 1919 and 1922. In the opening match of the former tournament, he netted a hat-trick to help his side to a 6–0 win over Chile, becoming the first-ever footballer to score a hat-trick in a major international tournament. A few days later, on 29 May, he started in the decisive match of the tournament against Uruguay, scoring the match-winning goal that allowed Brazil to win its first international title in the 122nd minute, the latest goal in Copa América history, a record that will likely stand forever due to the current rules.

Friedenreich was a member of the Brazil team that competed in the 1925 South American Championship, scoring once against in a 5–2 win over Paraguay on 6 December, and another one in a 2–2 draw against the eventual champions Argentina on Christmas Day. In doing so at the age of 33 years and 160 days, he became the oldest-ever goalscorer in the then short history of Copa America. Friedenreich was not picked by Brazil for the 1930 FIFA World Cup because of a clash between the Rio and São Paulo state football federations that saw only players from Rio travelling to the competition. According to official statistics from the CBF, he scored ten goals in 23 official matches for Brazil.

=== São Paulo ===
During the 1910s and 1920s, Friedenreich also played several matches for the São Paulo state team; for instance, in 1912 and 1913, he started in four matches against an unofficial Argentine national side, scoring once. The following year, in August 1914, Friedenreich started for both a Ypiranga/AA São Bento XI and a APEA League XI in two matches against Italian club Pro Vercelli, scoring in both. During a Paulistano tour of Europe in 1925, Friedenreich scored 12 goals to help his side win 9 out of 10 matches, notably scoring a hat-trick in a 7–2 trashing of France on 15 March, after which he began being called Le roi du football ("The King of Football"). He is widely regarded as the greatest Brazilian football player of the amateur era, as well as the biggest name in Brazilian football until the emergence of Leônidas da Silva.

== Style of play ==
Friedenreich was often described as a pioneer of jogo bonito, or "the beautiful game," a style that emphasized rapid play with short passes, quick touches, and fluid combinations. It also involved frequent long-range shots and attacks led by two or three fast-paced forwards to disorient the defense. Despite his relatively short stature (5 ft 7 in), Friedenreich was known for his speed, strength, and exceptional technical dribbling.

== After football ==
Despite his status as one of Brazil’s most renowned early footballers, Friedenreich did not transition into coaching or other roles within the football world after retiring. Instead, his post-football life was marked by financial hardship, and he received little support from the football institutions he had once represented. Both his wife and son, who outlived him, were also left in poverty. His decline into obscurity reflected a broader pattern in which former amateur-era players were forgotten in Brazil’s new, professional football era.

=== Posthumous tributes ===
Friedenreich has been the subject of posthumous tributes in his hometown of São Paulo, which named several places and buildings after him, such as a street and a park on the east side of the city, as well as a school located within the sports complex of the Maracanã Stadium. In 1999, IFFHS named him the fifth greatest Brazilian Player of the 20th Century, only behind Zizinho, Zico, Garrincha, and Pelé.

== Discrimination and race in Brazilian football ==
Friedenreich was subject to the racial prejudices of his era. Although his upbringing in a middle-class German family allowed him access to elite football clubs and shielded him from certain forms of social exclusion, his identity as a man of colour still marked him, in the eyes of many, as emblematic of poverty. As a result, he encountered racial bias even within the same elite spaces. To counter this, he felt compelled to constantly assert his belonging to the upper class, adopting "whitening" practices like using hot towels or gel to straighten his hair.

== Controversy in the number of goals ==
Due to a lack of documentation, the exact number of goals that Friedenreich scored is unknown. His former teammate Mario de Andrade compiled his goalscoring record, reaching the number of 1,239 goals, which he showed to journalist De Vaney, in hopes that he would register this tally in FIFA and the CBD; however, Andrade kept the papers for one last revision, so when he died a few days later, De Vaney attempted to recover them, but the papers were never found again because Andrade's family, uninterested in football, thought they were useless and threw them in the trash. His goalscoring record thus mysteriously vanished in the mid-1960s during a time when Friedenreich himself had Alzheimer's disease. Despite having no proof, De Vaney published Friedenreich's goalscoring record (1,239) in the newspaper Tribuna de Santos.

When writing Os Gigantes do Futebol Brasileiro ("The Giants of Brazilian Football"), published in Rio de Janeiro in 1965, João Maximo based Friedenreich's numbers on De Vaney's research, but erroneously recorded 1,329, instead of 1,239. This tally is 48 goals higher than Pelé's Guinness World Record of 1,281 goals, which caused him to be occasionally cited as one of the all-time top scorers in football history. For instance, Richard Henshaw wrote in the Encyclopedia of World Soccer that Friedenreich was "the greatest goalscorer in the history of football, with 1,329 goals", and even Guinness itself acknowledged this number by stating that he "scored an undocumented 1,329 goals". The media also said for years that he had never missed a single penalty in over 500 attempts, which is certain to be untrue, given that some records indicate that he wasted at least 12 penalties. Below are the reported numbers of goals scored between 1909 and 1935 according to different sources:

- 1,329 goals in 1,239 matches – according to journalists João Maximo and Marcos de Castro in the book Gigantes do futebol brasileiro (2011)
- 1,239 goals in 1,329 matches – according to research by his former teammate Mario de Andrade and journalist De Vaney
- 595 goals in 605 matches – according to the Centro de Referência do Futebol Brasileiro
- 558 goals in 562 matches – according to journalists Orlando Duarte and Severino Filho in the book Fried versus Pelé (2000)
- 557 goals in 562 matches – according to RSSSF
- 554 goals in 561 matches – according to journalist Alexandre da Costa in the book O Tigre do futebol: uma viagem nos tempos de Artur Friedenreich
- 357 goals in 323 matches (Note: Goals in the Campeonato Paulista.) – according to IFFHS

== Career statistics ==
=== Goals for Brazil main team ===
Scores and results list Brazil's goal tally first, score column indicates score after each Friedenreich goal.

List of international goals scored by Arthur Friedenreich
No.	Date	Venue	Opponent	Score	Result	Competition	Ref.
1	12 July 1916	Estadio GEBA, Buenos Aires	Uruguay	1–0	1–2	1916 South American Championship	
2	11 May 1919	Estádio de Laranjeiras, Rio de Janeiro, Brazil	Chile	1–0	6–0	1919 South American Championship	
3	11 May 1919	Estádio de Laranjeiras, Rio de Janeiro, Brazil	Chile	3–0	6–0	1919 South American Championship	
4	11 May 1919	Estádio de Laranjeiras, Rio de Janeiro, Brazil	Chile	6–0	6–0	1919 South American Championship	
5	29 May 1919	Estádio de Laranjeiras, Rio de Janeiro, Brazil	Uruguay	1–0	1–0	1919 South American Championship play-off	
6	6 December 1925	Estadio Sportivo Barracas, Buenos Aires, Argentina	Paraguay	2–0	5–2	1925 South American Championship	
7	25 December 1925	Estadio Sportivo Barracas, Buenos Aires, Argentina	Argentina	1–0	2–2	1925 South American Championship	
8	1 August 1930	Estádio de Laranjeiras, Rio de Janeiro, Brazil	France	2–2	3–2	Friendly	

=== Goals for São Paulo state team ===
Scores and results list São Paulo's goal tally first, score column indicates score after each Friedenreich goal.

List of international goals scored by Arthur Friedenreich
No.	Date	Venue	Opponent	Score	Result	Competition	Ref.
1	8 September 1912	Velódromo Paulistano, São Paulo, Brazil	Argentina	1–1	3–6	Friendly	
2	13 August 1914	Parque Antártica, São Paulo, Brazil	(Italy) Pro Vercelli		2–1	Friendly	
3	7 November 1915	Velódromo Paulistano, São Paulo, Brazil	Rio de Janeiro		8–0	Taça Rio-São Paulo de Seleções	
4	7 November 1915	Velódromo Paulistano, São Paulo, Brazil	Rio de Janeiro		8–0	Taça Rio-São Paulo de Seleções	
5	13 August 1916	Velódromo Paulistano, São Paulo, Brazil	Rio de Janeiro		5–0	Taça Rio-São Paulo de Seleções	
6	13 August 1916	Velódromo Paulistano, São Paulo, Brazil	Rio de Janeiro		5–0	Taça Rio-São Paulo de Seleções	
7	13 August 1916	Velódromo Paulistano, São Paulo, Brazil	Rio de Janeiro		5–0	Taça Rio-São Paulo de Seleções	
8	14 January 1917	Velódromo Paulistano, São Paulo, Brazil	(Uruguay) Dublin	1–4	1–5	Friendly	
9	15 November 1917	Parque Antártica, São Paulo, Brazil	(Brazil) Palestra Itália-SP		7–0	Friendly	
10	15 November 1917	Parque Antártica, São Paulo, Brazil	(Brazil) Palestra Itália-SP		7–0	Friendly	
11	25 December 1917	Chácara da Floresta, São Paulo, Brazil	Rio de Janeiro		9–1	Friendly	
12	25 December 1917	Chácara da Floresta, São Paulo, Brazil	Rio de Janeiro		9–1	Friendly	
13	25 December 1917	Chácara da Floresta, São Paulo, Brazil	Rio de Janeiro		9–1	Friendly	
14	25 December 1917	Chácara da Floresta, São Paulo, Brazil	Rio de Janeiro		9–1	Friendly	
15	25 December 1917	Chácara da Floresta, São Paulo, Brazil	Rio de Janeiro		9–1	Friendly	
16	2 June 1918	Chácara da Floresta, São Paulo, Brazil	Rio de Janeiro		4–2	Friendly	
17	2 June 1918	Chácara da Floresta, São Paulo, Brazil	Rio de Janeiro		4–2	Friendly	
18	4 August 1918	Estádio de Laranjeiras, Rio de Janeiro, Brazil	Rio de Janeiro		2–3	Friendly	
19	1 September 1918	Chácara da Floresta, São Paulo, Brazil	Rio de Janeiro		8–1	Friendly	
20	1 September 1918	Chácara da Floresta, São Paulo, Brazil	Rio de Janeiro		8–1	Friendly	
21	1 September 1918	Chácara da Floresta, São Paulo, Brazil	Rio de Janeiro		8–1	Friendly	
22	12 October 1918	Chácara da Floresta, São Paulo, Brazil	Rio de Janeiro	1–0	5–0	Friendly	
23	15 June 1919	Chácara da Floresta, São Paulo, Brazil	Rio de Janeiro	1–1	3–1	Taça Füchs	
24	15 June 1919	Chácara da Floresta, São Paulo, Brazil	Rio de Janeiro	3–1	3–1	Taça Füchs	
25	3 June 1920	Chácara da Floresta, São Paulo, Brazil	(Brazil) Palestra Itália-SP		1–2	Friendly	
26	6 June 1920	Estádio de Laranjeiras, Rio de Janeiro, Brazil	Rio de Janeiro	1–1	7–1	Taça Rodrigues Alves	
27	6 June 1920	Estádio de Laranjeiras, Rio de Janeiro, Brazil	Rio de Janeiro	3–1	7–1	Taça Rodrigues Alves	
28	6 June 1920	Estádio de Laranjeiras, Rio de Janeiro, Brazil	Rio de Janeiro	5–1	7–1	Taça Rodrigues Alves	
29	13 June 1920	Arena da Baixada, Curitiba, Brazil	(Paraná (state)) Paraná	2–0	8–1	Taça Afonso Camargo	
30	13 June 1920	Arena da Baixada, Curitiba, Brazil	(Paraná (state)) Paraná	3–0	8–1	Taça Afonso Camargo	
31	13 June 1920	Arena da Baixada, Curitiba, Brazil	(Paraná (state)) Paraná	4–0	8–1	Taça Afonso Camargo	
32	13 June 1920	Arena da Baixada, Curitiba, Brazil	(Paraná (state)) Paraná	6–1	8–1	Taça Afonso Camargo	
33	14 June 1920	Arena da Baixada, Curitiba, Brazil	(Brazil) Britânia		10–0	Friendly	
34	14 June 1920	Arena da Baixada, Curitiba, Brazil	(Brazil) Britânia		10–0	Friendly	
35	14 June 1920	Arena da Baixada, Curitiba, Brazil	(Brazil) Britânia		10–0	Friendly	
36	14 June 1920	Arena da Baixada, Curitiba, Brazil	(Brazil) Britânia		10–0	Friendly	
37	7 September 1920	Parque Antártica, São Paulo, Brazil	(Paraná (state)) Paraná		6–1	Taça Afonso Camargo	
38	7 September 1920	Parque Antártica, São Paulo, Brazil	(Paraná (state)) Paraná		6–1	Taça Afonso Camargo	
39	14 August 1921	Parque da Graciosa, Curitiba, Brazil	(Paraná (state)) Paraná	2–0	2–1	Taça Afonso Camargo	
40	14 July 1922	Chácara da Floresta, São Paulo, Brazil	(Paraná (state)) Paraná		8–3	Taça Afonso Camargo	
41	23 July 1922	Chácara da Floresta, São Paulo, Brazil	Minas Gerais		13–0	Brasileiro de Seleções	
42	23 July 1922	Chácara da Floresta, São Paulo, Brazil	Minas Gerais		13–0	Brasileiro de Seleções	
43	23 July 1922	Chácara da Floresta, São Paulo, Brazil	Minas Gerais		13–0	Brasileiro de Seleções	
44	2 August 1922	Chácara da Floresta, São Paulo, Brazil	Rio Grande do Sul		4–2	Brasileiro de Seleções	
45	2 August 1922	Chácara da Floresta, São Paulo, Brazil	Rio Grande do Sul		4–2	Brasileiro de Seleções	
46	6 August 1922	Parque Antártica, São Paulo, Brazil	Bahia		3–0	Brasileiro de Seleções	
47	13 August 1922	Estádio General Severiano, Rio de Janeiro, Brazil	Bahia	2–0	4–1	Brasileiro de Seleções	
48	13 August 1922	Estádio General Severiano, Rio de Janeiro, Brazil	Bahia	4–1	4–1	Brasileiro de Seleções	
49	27 August 1922	Estádio General Severiano, Rio de Janeiro, Brazil	Rio de Janeiro	2–1	2–1	Friendly	
50	4 October 1923	Chácara da Floresta, São Paulo, Brazil	(Brazil) Guarani		5–2	Friendly	
51	4 October 1923	Chácara da Floresta, São Paulo, Brazil	(Brazil) Guarani		5–2	Friendly	
52	4 October 1923	Chácara da Floresta, São Paulo, Brazil	(Brazil) Guarani		5–2	Friendly	
53	4 October 1923	Chácara da Floresta, São Paulo, Brazil	(Brazil) Guarani		5–2	Friendly	
54	7 October 1923	Chácara da Floresta, São Paulo, Brazil	(Paraná (state)) Paraná		5–1	Brasileiro de Seleções	
55	7 October 1923	Chácara da Floresta, São Paulo, Brazil	(Paraná (state)) Paraná		5–1	Brasileiro de Seleções	
56	2 August 1925	Parque Antártica, São Paulo, Brazil	Rio Grande do Sul		4–0	Brasileiro de Seleções	
57	6 September 1925	Estádio de Laranjeiras, Rio de Janeiro, Brazil	Pará	2–0	3–0	Brasileiro de Seleções	
58	6 September 1925	Estádio de Laranjeiras, Rio de Janeiro, Brazil	Pará	3–0	3–0	Brasileiro de Seleções	
59	31 October 1926	Vila Belmiro Stadium, Santos, Brazil	(Brazil) Santos		7–1	Friendly	
60	14 November 1926	Chácara da Floresta, São Paulo, Brazil	(Argentina) Asociación Amateurs de Football		1–2	Friendly	
61	25 March 1928	Chácara da Floresta, São Paulo, Brazil	Rio de Janeiro		9–1	Taça Castelões	
62	25 March 1928	Chácara da Floresta, São Paulo, Brazil	Rio de Janeiro		9–1	Taça Castelões	
63	25 March 1928	Chácara da Floresta, São Paulo, Brazil	Rio de Janeiro		9–1	Taça Castelões	
64	20 January 1929	Campo do Independência, São Paulo, Brazil	Rio de Janeiro		6–2	Friendly	
65	3 May 1929	Estádio da Ponte Grande, São Paulo, Brazil	Rio de Janeiro	1–1	4–1	Friendly	
66	3 May 1929	Estádio da Ponte Grande, São Paulo, Brazil	Rio de Janeiro	2–1	4–1	Friendly	
67	3 May 1929	Estádio da Ponte Grande, São Paulo, Brazil	Rio de Janeiro	4–1	4–1	Friendly	
68	23 June 1929	Rua José do Patrocínio, Rio de Janeiro, Brazil	Rio de Janeiro		3–4	Friendly	
69	13 October 1929	Estádio da Ponte Grande, São Paulo, Brazil	Rio de Janeiro		5–3	Taça Júlio Prestes	
70	26 March 1930	Chácara da Floresta, São Paulo, Brazil	(Brazil) Internacional-SP		4–2	Friendly	
71	28 March 1930	Chácara da Floresta, São Paulo, Brazil	(Argentina) Sportivo Buenos Aires	7–0	8–1	Friendly	
72	19 June 1930	Parque Antártica, São Paulo, Brazil	(United States) New York Hakoah	1–0	3–1	Friendly	
73	16 July 1931	Estádio da Ponte Grande, São Paulo, Brazil	(Brazil) Internacional-SP		3–2	Friendly	
74	2 August 1931	Chácara da Floresta, São Paulo, Brazil	(Brazil) Santos	3–1	9–1	Friendly	
75	2 August 1931	Chácara da Floresta, São Paulo, Brazil	(Brazil) Santos	6–1	9–1	Friendly	
76	2 August 1931	Chácara da Floresta, São Paulo, Brazil	(Brazil) Santos	7–1	9–1	Friendly	
77	2 August 1931	Chácara da Floresta, São Paulo, Brazil	(Brazil) Santos	8–1	9–1	Friendly	
78	16 August 1931	Chácara da Floresta, São Paulo, Brazil	Pernambuco		11–3	Brasileiro de Seleções	
79	16 August 1931	Chácara da Floresta, São Paulo, Brazil	Pernambuco		11–3	Brasileiro de Seleções	
80	30 August 1931	Parque São Jorge, São Paulo, Brazil	Rio de Janeiro	2–0	3–0	Brasileiro de Seleções	
81	30 August 1931	Parque São Jorge, São Paulo, Brazil	Rio de Janeiro	3–0	3–0	Brasileiro de Seleções	

== Honours ==
Paulistano

- Campeonato Paulista (7): 1916, 1918, 1919, 1921, 1926, 1927, 1929
- Copa dos Campeões Estaduais: 1920

São Paulo

- Campeonato Paulista: 1931

São Paulo state team

- Campeonato Brasileiro de Seleções Estaduais: 1922, 1923

Brazil

- Copa América: 1919, 1922
- Roca Cup: 1914

Individual

- South American Championship player of the tournament: 1919
- Copa América top scorer: 1919
- IFFHS Brazilian Player of the 20th Century: 5th place
- IFFHS South American Player of the 20th Century: 13th place
- Campeonato Paulista top scorer: 1912, 1914, 1917, 1918, 1919, 1921, 1927, 1928, 1929

== See also ==
- German Brazilians
