= Rio de Janeiro state football team =

Unofficial national football team representing the Rio de Janeiro state

Rio de Janeiro
- Nickname: Seleção Carioca
- Association: Federação de Futebol do Estado do Rio de Janeiro
- Confederation: CBF
- Top scorer: Nilo (52)
- Home stadium: Estádio do Maracanã
First colours	Second colours

First international
- (São Paulo (state)) São Paulo 2–2 Rio de Janeiro (São Paulo, Brazil; 19 October 1901)

Biggest win
- Rio de Janeiro 15–0 Minas Gerais (Rio de Janeiro, Brazil; 14 July 1920)

Biggest defeat
- (São Paulo (state)) São Paulo 8–0 Rio de Janeiro (São Paulo, Brazil; 7 November 1915) (São Paulo (state)) São Paulo 9–1 Rio de Janeiro (São Paulo, Brazil; 25 December 1917) (São Paulo (state)) São Paulo 9–1 Rio de Janeiro (São Paulo, Brazil; 25 March 1928)

The Rio de Janeiro state football team (Portuguese: Seleção Carioca de Futebol) represents Rio de Janeiro in association football.

== History ==
The team was created in 1901 in response to the creation of a team for São Paulo, since at the beginning of the 20th century these were the two centers where the practice of football began in Brazil.

Because they preceded the Brazil national squad which played its first match in 1914, sometimes Rio de Janeiro represented the country (as did the São Paulo state team), against foreign squads that toured South America, or against Argentina, where football was more developed in that period.

It is the most successful team in the Campeonato Brasileiro de Seleções Estaduais (Brazilian State Selection Championship), with 15 titles conquered.

== Periods ==
Rio de Janeiro was the capital of Brazil until 1960, year of construction of Brasília, then the Seleção Carioca represented the Federal District (later, the Guanabara State) until in 1975, there was the unification of the city of Rio de Janeiro with the state of Rio de Janeiro. There was also the Rio de Janeiro state football team (countryside), called Seleção Fluminense (1922–1978), who faced the Seleção Carioca several times in previous decades.

State	Years
Rio de Janeiro (DF)	1901–1960
Guanabara (GB)	1960–1975
(Rio de Janeiro (state)) Rio de Janeiro (RJ)	1975–

== Players ==
Following is the information about the players who appeared for the Rio de Janeiro state team:

=== Notable players ===
- Ademir
- Bismarck
- Carvalho Leite
- Castilho
- Chico
- (Socialist Federal Republic of Yugoslavia) Dejan Petkovic
- Didi
- Domingos da Guia
- (Argentina) Edgardo Andrada
- Edmundo
- Garrincha
- Gérson
- (England) Henry Welfare
- Leônidas
- Nilo
- Patesko
- Preguinho
- Renato Gaúcho
- Roberto Dinamite
- Romário
- Sylvio Pirillo
- Túlio Maravilha
- Vavá
- Zagallo
- Zezé
- Zico
- Zizinho

=== Top goalscorers ===
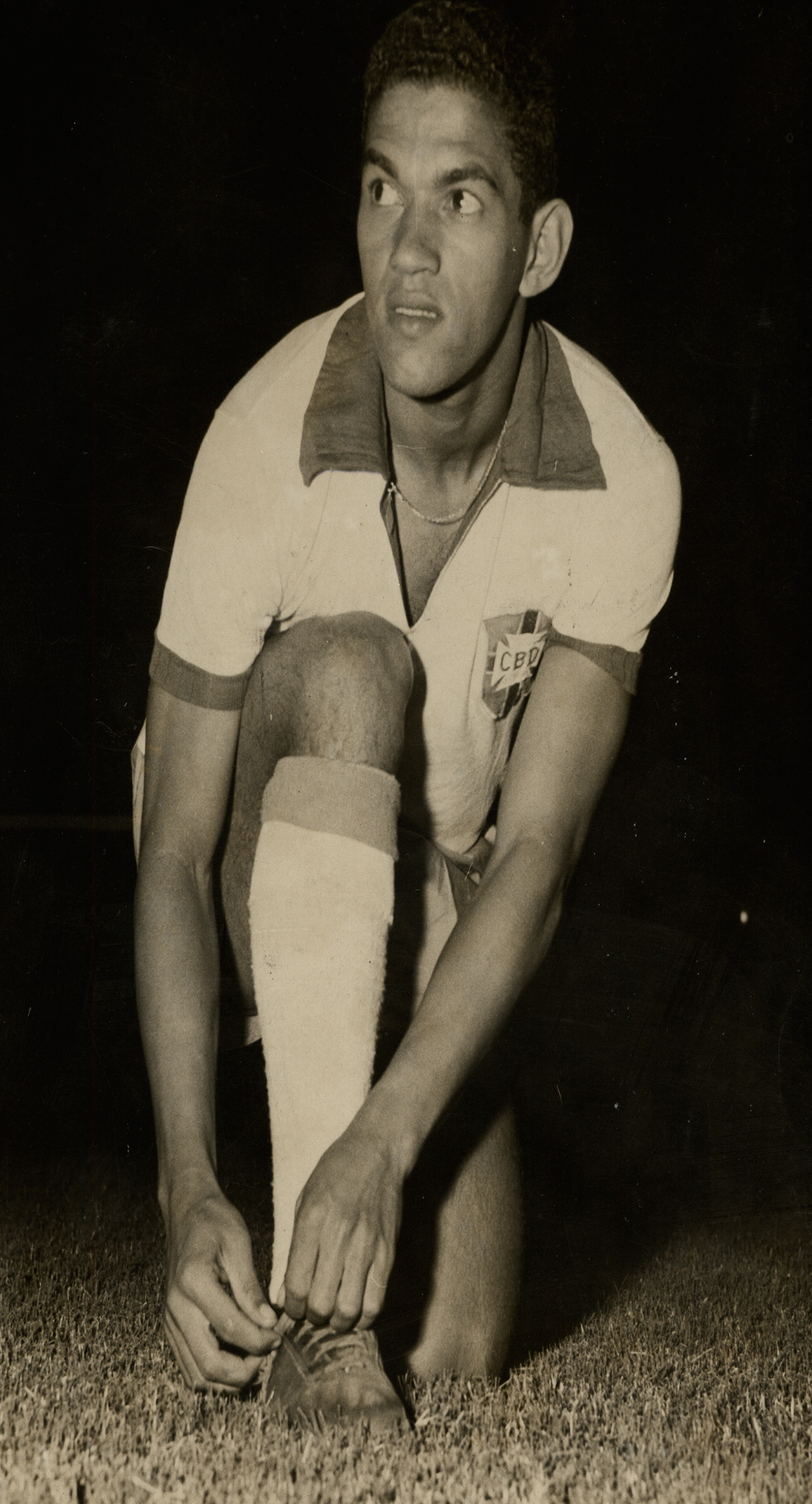
Garrincha scored 8 goals for Seleção Carioca (1955–1963)

Rank	Player	Goals	Career
1	Nilo	52	1922–1934
2	Russinho	36	1926–1935
3	Zezé	34	1918–1923
3	Carvalho Leite	34	1931–1939
5	Harry Welfare	31	1913–1920
6	Oswaldinho	23	1926–1929
7	Carreiro	20	1935–1941
8	Leônidas da Silva	19	1931–1941
9	Ademir de Menezes	17	1943–1955
9	Sylvio Pirillo	17	1943

== Managers ==
These are all the managers who as headed Rio de Janeiro state team:

- Luiz Vinhaes (1931–1933)
- Carlos Carlomagno (1934–1937)
- Hílton Santos (1938)
- Jayme Barcelos (1938–1939)
- Costa Velho (1939)
- Osvaldo Melo (1940–1941)
- Flávio Costa (1941–1945)
- Luiz Vinhaes (1946)
- Flávio Costa (1947–1950)
- Zezé Moreira (1952)
- Martim Francisco (1955)
- Newton Anet (1956)
- Flávio Costa (1956)
- Sylvio Pirillo (1957)
- Gentil Cardoso (1957)
- Tim (1959–1960)
- Jorge Vieira (1961)
- Flávio Costa (1962–1963)
- Daniel Pinto (1964)
- Mário Zagallo (1967)
- Paulinho de Almeida (1968)
- Mário Zagallo (1969)
- Otto Glória (1970)
- Paraguaio (1971)
- Mário Travaglini (1972–1975)
- Orlando Fantoni (1977)
- Edu Coimbra (1981)
- Zé Mario (1982)
- Sebastião Lazaroni (1987)
- José Maria Pena (1988)
- Antônio Clemente (1990)
- Sérgio Cosme (1990)
- Ricardo Barreto (1996)
- Alcir Portela (1996)
- Renato Gaúcho (2004)
- Alfredo Sampaio (2008)
- Zico (2010)

== Honours ==
- Campeonato Brasileiro de Seleções Estaduais:
  - Winners (15): 1924, 1925, 1927, 1928, 1931, 1935 (CBD), 1935 (FBF), 1938, 1939, 1940, 1943, 1944, 1946, 1950, 1987
- Taça Rio-São Paulo de Seleções: (vs. São Paulo)
  - Winners: 1915
- Taça Delfim Moreira: (vs. Minas Gerais)
  - Winners (2): 1919, 1920
- Taça São Januário: (vs. Huracán)
  - Winners: 1930
- Taça Emílio Garrastazu Médici: (vs. Minas Gerais)
  - Winners: 1971
- Taça Heleno Nunes: (vs. São Paulo)
  - Winners: 1975

== Fixtures and results ==
=== 21st century ===
The Rio de Janeiro team played only three matches in the XXI century:

10 Oct 2004 Friendly	Rio de Janeiro (Rio de Janeiro (state))	1–1	(São Paulo (state)) São Paulo	Rio de Janeiro
	Romário 74'	Report	Anderson Lima 18'	Stadium: Estádio do Maracanã; Attendance: 58.147; Referee: Willian de Souza Nery (RJ)

22 Jun 2008 Friendly	Brazil U23	1–0	(Rio de Janeiro (state)) Rio de Janeiro	Volta Redonda
	Alexandre Pato 7'	Report		Stadium: Estádio Raulino de Oliveira; Attendance: 11.503; Referee: Marcelo de Lima Henrique (RJ)

9 Dec 2010 Copa Inovação	São Paulo (São Paulo (state))	3–1	(Rio de Janeiro (state)) Rio de Janeiro	São Caetano do Sul
	Elano 8' (pen.); Baiano 50'; Neymar 84' (pen.)		Dedé 22'	Stadium: Estádio Anacleto Campanella; Referee: Sálvio Spínola Fagundes Filho (SP)

== Last squad ==
The following players were called up for the Copa Inovação against São Paulo, on 9 December 2010.

No.	Pos.	Player	Date of birth (age)	Caps	Goals	Club
	GK	Rafael	24 March 1984 (aged 26)	1	0	(Brazilian Football Confederation) Fluminense
	GK	Vinícius	9 November 1984 (aged 26)	1	0	(Brazilian Football Confederation) Flamengo
	DF	Léo Moura	23 October 1978 (aged 32)	1	0	(Brazilian Football Confederation) Flamengo
	DF	Leandro Euzébio	18 August 1981 (aged 29)	1	0	(Brazilian Football Confederation) Fluminense
	DF	Dedé	1 July 1988 (aged 22)	1	1	(Brazilian Football Confederation) Vasco da Gama
	DF	Alessandro	21 September 1977 (aged 33)	0	0	(Brazilian Football Confederation) Botafogo
	DF	Fagner	11 June 1989 (aged 21)	1	0	(Brazilian Football Confederation) Vasco da Gama
	DF	Antônio Carlos	22 June 1983 (aged 27)	1	0	(Brazilian Football Confederation) Botafogo
	DF	Marcelo Cordeiro	12 April 1981 (aged 29)	1	0	(Brazilian Football Confederation) Botafogo
	MF	Fernando Bob	7 January 1988 (aged 22)	1	0	(Brazilian Football Confederation) Fluminense
	MF	Somália	10 April 1984 (aged 26)	1	0	(Brazilian Football Confederation) Botafogo
	MF	Carlos Alberto	11 December 1984 (aged 25)	1	0	(Brazilian Football Confederation) Vasco da Gama
	MF	Toró	13 April 1986 (aged 24)	1	0	(Brazilian Football Confederation) Flamengo
	MF	Tartá	13 April 1989 (aged 21)	1	0	(Brazilian Football Confederation) Fluminense
	FW	Somália	22 June 1977 (aged 33)	1	0	(Brazilian Football Confederation) Duque de Caxias
	FW	Jóbson	15 February 1988 (aged 22)	0	0	(Brazilian Football Confederation) Botafogo
	FW	Diego Maurício	25 June 1991 (aged 19)	1	0	(Brazilian Football Confederation) Flamengo
	FW	Daniel Morais	12 May 1986 (aged 24)	0	0	(Brazilian Football Confederation) America
	FW	Wellington Silva	6 January 1993 (aged 17)	0	0	(Brazilian Football Confederation) Fluminense

== Head-to-head record ==
Below is a result summary of all matches Rio de Janeiro have played against another Brazilian state teams, FIFA national teams and clubs.

Positive Record Neutral Record Negative Record

=== State teams (non-FIFA) ===
Opponent	Pld	W	D	L	GF	GA	GD
Bahia	11	9	2	0	45	6	+39
Ceará	3	2	1	0	15	1	+14
Espírito Santo	5	4	0	1	22	7	+15
Maranhão	2	2	0	0	7	2	+5
Minas Gerais	46	29	8	9	164	66	+98
Pará	6	6	0	0	34	5	+29
(Paraná (state)) Paraná	3	3	0	0	13	6	+7
Pernambuco	9	6	2	1	33	12	+21
(Rio de Janeiro (state)) Rio de Janeiro (Countryside)	13	12	0	1	59	19	+40
Rio Grande do Norte	2	1	1	0	5	3	+2
Rio Grande do Sul	9	6	2	1	31	13	+18
(São Paulo (state)) São Paulo	138	47	25	66	273	341	-68
Total (12)	247	127	41	79	701	481	+220

=== National teams (FIFA) ===
Opponent	Pld	W	D	L	GF	GA	GD
Argentina	7	1	1	5	9	20	-11
Brazil	1	0	0	1	2	4	-2
Brazil U23	1	0	0	1	0	1	-1
Chile	2	2	0	0	8	2	+6
Peru	1	1	0	0	5	1	+4
Portugal	1	1	0	0	1	0	+1
Total (6)	13	5	1	7	25	28	-3
