= Dendê (footballer) =

Brazilian footballer (1953–2024)

Personal information
- Full name: José Alberto Vasconcellos da Silva
- Date of birth: 26 May 1953
- Place of birth: Alagoinhas, Bahia, Brazil
- Date of death: 14 June 2024 (aged 71)
- Place of death: Salvador, Bahia, Brazil
- Position: Forward

Senior career*
Years	Team	Apps	(Gls)
1973–1974	Bahia		
1974	Atlético de Alagoinhas		
1975–1977	Flamengo	57	(0)
1977–1980	Vitória		
1981–1984	Catuense		
1984	Leônico		
1985–1986	Atlético de Alagoinhas		
1986–1987	Lagarto EC		
- * Club domestic league appearances and goals

José Alberto Vasconcellos da Silva (26 May 1953 – 14 June 2024), better known as Dendê, was a Brazilian professional footballer who played as a forward.

== Career ==
Called Dendê for his red hair, the player played for Bahia during the two-time state championship in 1973 and 1974. He transferred to Flamengo where he played for 57 matches, without scoring a goal, being hired again by a team from Bahia, EC Vitória. Dendê traveled with his Chevrolet Chevette for more than 1700 km from Rio de Janeiro to Salvador. He was a highlight of the club during the 1979 Brazilian Championship and state champion in 1980. He would later play for Catuense, Leônico, Atlético de Alagoinhas and Lagarto EC.

== Death ==
Dende died on 14 June 2024, at the age of 71.

== Honours ==
Bahia

- Campeonato Baiano: 1973, 1974

Vitória

- Campeonato Baiano: 1980
