= Lúcio (footballer, born 1953) =

Brazilian footballer

Personal information
- Full name: Lúcio Idair Frasson
- Date of birth: 12 February 1953 (age 73)
- Place of birth: Criciúma, Brazil
- Height: 1.75 m (5 ft 9 in)
- Position: Defender

Youth career
- Próspera

Senior career*
Years	Team	Apps	(Gls)
1971–1974	Próspera		
1971	→ Guarani (loan)		
1974–1976	Vila Nova		
1976	Avaí		
1977	Comerciário		
1977–1980	Internacional		
1980	Colorado-PR		
1981	Figueirense		
- * Club domestic league appearances and goals as of 10 February 2024

Lúcio Idair Frasson (born 12 February 1953), simply known as Lúcio, is a Brazilian former professional footballer who played as a defender.

== Career ==
Born in Criciúma, he started his career at EC Próspera. He played both right back and centre-back, standing out for the goals he scored with strong kicks. At Vila Nova he became an idol in the 1973 Goiás title where the team was undefeated champion. At Internacional, he also won a state championship in 1978 and the Brazilian championship in 1979. He scored a historic goal against Émerson Leão in a friendly match between the Rio Grande do Sul state team and the Brazil national football team. He currently owns a fabric manufacturing company in Criciúma.

== Honours ==
Vila Nova

- Campeonato Goiano: 1973

Internacional

- Campeonato Brasileiro: 1979
- Campeonato Gaúcho: 1978
