= Ditinho =

Brazilian footballer

Personal information
- Full name: Francimar Rosa dos Santos
- Date of birth: 21 March 1972 (age 54)
- Place of birth: São José dos Campos, Brazil
- Height: 1.70 m (5 ft 7 in)
- Position: Forward

Team information
- Current team: URT

Youth career
- São José-SP

Senior career*
Years	Team	Apps	(Gls)
1994	São José-SP		
1995	Sãocarlense		
1996–1997	Noroeste		
1997–1998	Etti Jundiaí		
1998	Ponte Preta		
1998	Passos		
1998–1999	URT	5	(2)
1999	Guarani	1	(0)
2000–2006	URT	13	(6)
2006–2007	Funorte		
2007	SEV Hortolândia	14	(6)
2008	URT		
2009–2010	Funorte		
2011–2012	URT	7	(4)
2025–	URT	3	(0)
- * Club domestic league appearances and goals as of 22 February 2024

Francimar Rosa dos Santos (born 21 March 1972), better known as Ditinho, is a Brazilian footballer who plays as a forward for URT.

== Career ==
Born in São José dos Campos, Ditinho was revealed by São José EC. He also played for Sãocarlense, Noroeste, Paulista and Ponte Preta, until arriving at Passos FC in Minas Gerais, when he was champion of the third level of the state. The following year he was hired by URT, a club for which he gained notoriety by being twice top scorer in the Minas Gerais championship, in 1999 and 2000.

For URT, Ditinho made a total of 204 appearances and scored 101 goals, being the highest scorer in the club's history.

In February 2025, at the age of 52, Ditinho returned to professional football for URT.

== Personal life ==
Ditinho was elected councilor in Patos de Minas in the 2012 elections, however, the player resigned from his mandate as his mother's health worsened.

== Honours ==
Passos

- Campeonato Mineiro Segunda Divisão: 1998

URT

- Taça Minas Gerais:1999, 2000

Individual

- 1998 Campeonato Mineiro Módulo II top scorer: 12 goals
- 1999 Campeonato Mineiro top scorer: 12 goals
- 2000 Campeonato Mineiro top scorer: 14 goals
