= São Paulo state football team =

Unofficial national football team representing the São Paulo state

São Paulo
- Nickname: Seleção Paulista
- Association: Federação Paulista de Futebol
- Confederation: CBF
- Top scorer: Arthur Friedenreich (96)
- Home stadium: Estádio do Pacaembu; Estádio do Morumbi
First colours	Second colours

First international
- (São Paulo (state)) São Paulo 2–2 Rio de Janeiro (São Paulo, Brazil; 19 October 1901)

Biggest win
- (São Paulo (state)) São Paulo 16–0 Santa Catarina (São Paulo, Brazil; 26 September 1926)

Biggest defeat
- (São Paulo (state)) São Paulo 1–7 Torino (Italy) (São Paulo, Brazil; 16 August 1914) (São Paulo (state)) São Paulo 0–6 South Africa (São Paulo, Brazil; 31 July 1906) (São Paulo (state)) São Paulo 0–6 Argentina (São Paulo, Brazil; 5 July 1908)

The São Paulo state football team (Portuguese: Seleção Paulista de Futebol) represents São Paulo in association football.

== History ==
=== The first steps of football in Brazil ===
In order to measure the strength of the two first centers of association football in Brazil, the need arose to hold fixtures between footballers who played in the states of São Paulo and the Federal District of Rio de Janeiro. In 1901, the first combined teams were formed, to later become the more formalised state teams.

These were the ones responsible for holding the first international football match to take place in Brazilian territory. On 31 July 1906, at the Velódromo da Consolação, São Paulo (called "Brazilian representatives") against the South Africa FA took place. The South Africans (at the time, known as the All-White Team), was touring across South America to play against Argentine teams, much more developed than the incipient Brazilian football. The result was a resounding 6–0 for the Africans.

In 1907, the first interstate competition in Brazil took place, the Taça Brasil de Seleções, putting rivals Rio de Janeiro and São Paulo face to face. São Paulo won both matches and conquered the first trophy in its history.

With the growth of football in the country, the games of the São Paulo team became more frequent in the 1910s, with emphasis on international matches representing Brazil (which had not yet had the national team established) against Argentina in 1912 and Chile twice during 1913. The difference in development between Brazilian football and its neighbors at that time was still large, and São Paulo was defeated in all three matches.

=== "The Tiger" Friedenreich era ===
The great name of the São Paulo team is undoubtedly Arthur Friedenreich. "The Tiger", as he became famous after CA Paulistano's tour of Europe in 1925, the first great Brazilian footballer recognized internationally, lived his heyday during the 1920s, a time when state selections were consolidated as de facto like teams, and not merely representations of the leagues.

This time, it was the state of São Paulo that was far ahead in development compared to the others, so big wins, some into double digits, were frequent in front of the other competitors. Friedenreich scored exactly 80 goals with the Seleção Paulista team shirt, more than Pelé for Brazil (77 goals). Another monster of that period, Feitiço, scored 69 goals, followed by Petronilho de Brito with 54.

=== Brazilian State Teams Championship ===
At that time, the state teams from Minas Gerais, Paraná, Rio Grande do Sul and Bahia were established, which would accompany Rio de Janeiro and São Paulo in the first major competition of the category, the Campeonato Brasileiro de Seleções Estaduais (English: Brazilian State Teams Championship). Organized from the 1920s to the 1960s almost without interruption, this was the golden age of state teams.

Large attendances were drawn to the grounds, which gradually stopped being simple pitches and became stadiums, a fundamental step for Brazil to develop the fever for football we know today. São Paulo is the second most successful team in the Campeonato Brasileiro de Seleções Estaduais, with 13 titles (against 14 by Rio de Janeiro). The Minas Gerais and Bahia team also achieved the glory once.

=== Clubs football, schedule and decline ===
With increasingly professionalized football, international club competitions, transfers of athletes to Europe, and the Brazil national team being a world phenomenon after the 1970 FIFA World Cup, the football of state teams began to fade. Just over twenty matches were played from the 1980s to 2010, the date of the last appearance of the São Paulo team; the state model so acclaimed at the beginning of the 20th century seems to no longer please the conventional supporter. No longer featuring the great idols, and especially, with no space in the tight schedule of Brazil's football calendar, state teams generally stopped being used. Officially, the federations do not consider the teams extinct, but in practice, there is no longer any interest in reactivating them.

With the creation of ConiFA, a São Paulo team was considered for the entity's competitions (São Paulo FAD), but that has no relationship with the Federação Paulista de Futebol, and therefore, with the historical São Paulo state football team.

== Players ==
Following is the information about the players who appeared for the São Paulo state team:

=== Notable players ===
- Ademir da Guia
- Araken
- Cafu
- Careca
- Carlos Alberto
- Charles Miller
- Coutinho
- (Uruguay) Darío Pereyra
- Djalma Santos
- Feitiço
- Friedenreich
- Jair da Rosa Pinto
- (Chile) Jorge Valdivia
- Elano
- (Colombia) Freddy Rincón
- Friaça
- (Argentina) José Poy
- Leão
- Leônidas
- Marcelinho Carioca
- Neymar
- Pelé
- Pepe
- Oscar
- Petronilho de Brito
- Remo
- Rivellino
- Socrates
- Teixeirinha
- Toninho Guerreiro
- Viola
- Waldemar de Brito

=== Top goalscorers ===
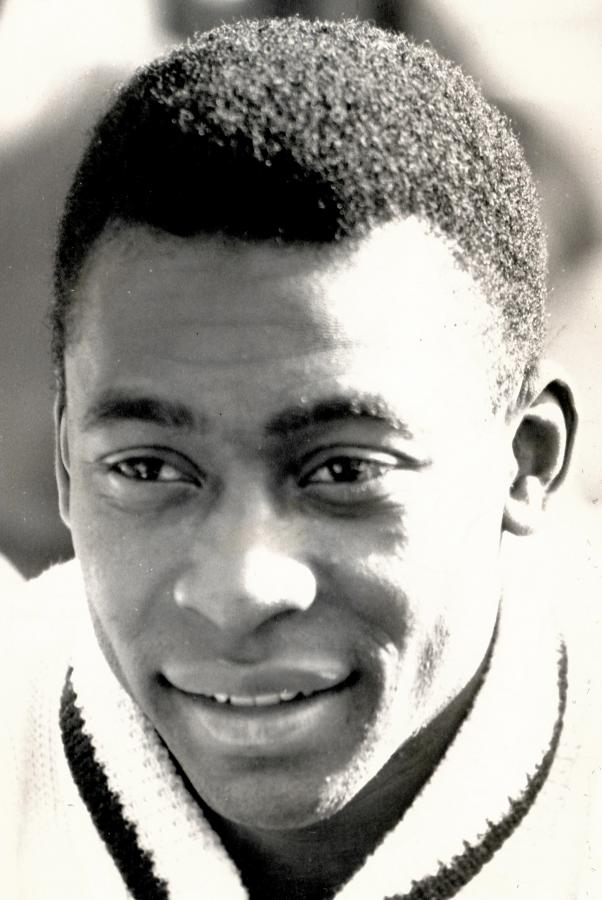
Pelé scored 12 goals for São Paulo state team, between 1959 and 1969

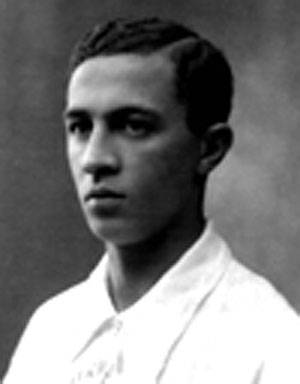
Friedenreich, the top goalscorer of all-time with 80 goals

Rank	Player	Goals	Career
1	Arthur Friedenreich	80	1912–1931
2	Feitiço	69	1922–1933
3	Petronilho de Brito	54	1925–1931
4	Heitor	46	1919–1931
5	Neco	30	1914–1926
6	Araken Patusca	28	1925–1939
7	Luisinho	27	1931–1944
8	Teleco	24	1935–1940
9	Servílio	21	1939–1947
10	Formiga	18	1913–1930

== Managers ==
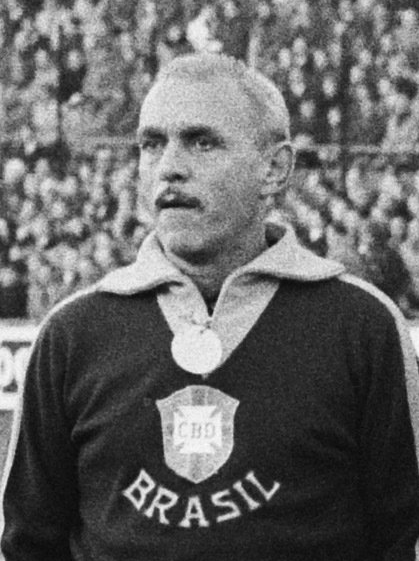
Aymoré Moreira, the coach who most often directed the São Paulo team.

These are all the managers who as headed São Paulo state team:

- Sílvio Lagreca (1931–1939)
- Ângelo Mastrandrea (1941)
- Flávio Costa (1941–1942)
- Armando Del Debbio (1942–1943)
- Vicente Feola (1944)
- (Portugal) Joreca (1946–1947)
- Vicente Feola (1949–1950)
- Aymoré Moreira (1950–1955)
- Osvaldo Brandão (1955)
- Zezé Procópio (1956)
- Aymoré Moreira (1957)
- Lula (1958–1959)
- Aymoré Moreira (1960)
- Lula (1961–1962)
- Osvaldo Brandão (1963)
- Aymoré Moreira (1964–1967)
- Antoninho (1968–1969)
- Alfredo Ramos (1973)
- Otto Glória (1974)
- (Argentina) José Poy (1974–1975)
- Rubens Minelli (1977)
- Carlos Alberto Silva (1980)
- Jorge Vieira (1981)
- Mário Travaglini (1982–1984)
- Candinho (1986)
- Rubens Minelli (1987–1988)
- Jair Pereira (1988–1990)
- Alfredo Mostarda (1990)
- Vanderlei Luxemburgo (1996)
- Oswaldo de Oliveira (1999)
- Tite (2004)
- Caio Júnior (2007)
- Vagner Mancini (2010)

== Honours ==
- Campeonato Brasileiro de Seleções Estaduais:
  - Winners (13): 1922, 1923, 1926, 1929, 1933 (FBF), 1934 (FBF), 1936, 1941, 1942, 1952, 1954, 1956, 1959
- Taça Brasil de Seleções: (vs. Rio de Janeiro)
  - Winners: 1907
- Taça Rio-São Paulo de Seleções: (vs. Rio de Janeiro)
  - Winners: 1916
- Taça Füchs: (vs. Rio de Janeiro)
  - Winners: 1918
- Taça Rodrigues Alves: (vs. Rio de Janeiro)
  - Winners (2): 1919, 1920
- Taça Afonso de Camargo: (vs. Paraná)
  - Winners (3): 1920, 1921, 1922
- Taça Washington Luís: (vs. Paraná)
  - Winners: 1923
- Taça Raul Pontual: (vs. Palestra Itália-PR)
  - Winners: 1926
- Taça Castellões: (vs. Rio de Janeiro)
  - Winners: 1928
- Taça Broadway Melody: (vs. Bologna)
  - Winners: 1929
- Taça Júlio Prestes: (vs. Rio de Janeiro)
  - Winners: 1929
- Taça General Artigas: (vs. Nacional/Peñarol)
  - Winners: 1955
- Torneio Garrastazu Médici:
  - Winners: 1969
- Taça ACERJ: (vs. Rio de Janeiro)
  - Winners: 1981
- Troféu Miguel Arraes: (vs. Pernambuco)
  - Winners: 2007
- Copa Inovação: (vs. Rio de Janeiro)
  - Winners: 2010

== Fixtures and results ==
=== 21st century ===
The São Paulo team played only three matches in the XXI century:

10 Oct 2004 Friendly	Rio de Janeiro (Rio de Janeiro (state))	1–1	(São Paulo (state)) São Paulo	Rio de Janeiro
	Romário 74'	Report	Anderson Lima 18'	Stadium: Estádio do Maracanã; Attendance: 58.147; Referee: Willian de Souza Nery

1 May 2007 Troféu Miguel Arraes	Pernambuco	0–2	(São Paulo (state)) São Paulo	Recife
		Report	Valdivia 9', 74'	Stadium: Estádio do Arruda; Referee: Cláudio Mercante

9 Dec 2010 Copa Inovação	São Paulo (São Paulo (state))	3–1	(Rio de Janeiro (state)) Rio de Janeiro	São Caetano do Sul
	Elano 8' (pen.); Baiano 50'; Neymar 84' (pen.)	Report	Dedé 22'	Stadium: Estádio Anacleto Campanella; Referee: Sávio Spínola

== Last squad ==
The following players were called up for the Copa Inovação against Rio de Janeiro, on 9 December 2010.

No.	Pos.	Player	Date of birth (age)	Caps	Goals	Club
	GK	Fábio Costa	27 November 1977 (aged 33)	1	0	(Brazilian Football Confederation) Atlético Mineiro
	GK	Gustavo	2 April 1989 (aged 21)	1	0	(Brazilian Football Confederation) Ponte Preta
	DF	Paulo César	26 August 1978 (aged 32)	1	0	(Brazilian Football Confederation) Grêmio Prudente
	DF	Anderson	27 April 1980 (aged 30)	1	0	(Brazilian Football Confederation) Santo André
	DF	Chicão	3 June 1981 (aged 29)	0	0	(Brazilian Football Confederation) Corinthians
	DF	Leandro Castán	5 November 1986 (aged 24)	1	0	(Brazilian Football Confederation) Corinthians
	DF	Diogo	30 December 1989 (aged 20)	1	0	(Brazilian Football Confederation) São Paulo
	DF	Baiano	28 June 1978 (aged 32)	1	1	(Brazilian Football Confederation) Guarani
	MF	Casemiro	23 February 1992 (aged 18)	0	0	(Brazilian Football Confederation) São Paulo
	MF	Ralf	9 June 1984 (aged 26)	1	0	(Brazilian Football Confederation) Corinthians
	MF	Elias	16 May 1985 (aged 25)	0	0	(Royal Spanish Football Federation) Atletico de Madrid
	MF	Fabrício	5 July 1982 (aged 28)	1	0	(Brazilian Football Confederation) Cruzeiro
	MF	Paulinho	25 July 1988 (aged 22)	0	0	(Brazilian Football Confederation) Bragantino
	MF	Juninho Paulista	22 February 1973 (aged 37)	1	0	(Brazilian Football Confederation) Ituano
	MF	Elano	14 June 1981 (aged 29)	1	1	(Brazilian Football Confederation) Santos
	MF	Bruno César	3 November 1988 (aged 22)	1	0	(Brazilian Football Confederation) Corinthians
	FW	Neymar	5 February 1992 (aged 18)	1	1	(Brazilian Football Confederation) Santos
	FW	Marcos Aurélio	23 September 1977 (aged 33)	0	0	(Brazilian Football Confederation) Bragantino
	FW	Dentinho	19 January 1989 (aged 21)	1	0	(Brazilian Football Confederation) Corinthians
	FW	Wilson	21 March 1985 (aged 25)	0	0	(Brazilian Football Confederation) Sport Recife
	FW	Mazola	8 May 1989 (aged 21)	1	0	(Brazilian Football Confederation) Guarani

== Head-to-head record ==
Below is a result summary of all matches São Paulo have played against another Brazilian state teams, FIFA national teams and clubs.

Positive Record Neutral Record Negative Record

=== State teams (non-FIFA) ===
Opponent	Pld	W	D	L	GF	GA	GD
Bahia	15	12	0	3	57	16	+41
(Federal District (Brazil)) Distrito Federal	1	1	0	0	8	0	+8
Espírito Santo	5	4	1	0	19	5	+14
Goiás	3	3	0	0	7	1	+6
Maranhão	1	1	0	0	13	1	+12
Minas Gerais	16	11	2	3	53	21	+32
Pará	3	3	0	0	20	0	+20
(Paraná (state)) Paraná	19	17	2	0	102	23	+79
Pernambuco	7	6	0	1	30	9	+21
(Rio de Janeiro (state)) Rio de Janeiro	138	66	25	47	341	273	+68
(Rio de Janeiro (state)) Rio de Janeiro (Countryside)	1	1	0	0	5	1	+4
Rio Grande do Sul	29	23	4	2	107	35	+72
(Santa Catarina (state)) Santa Catarina	1	1	0	0	16	0	+16
Total (13)	239	149	34	56	778	385	+393

=== National teams (FIFA) ===
Opponent	Pld	W	D	L	GF	GA	GD
Argentina	7	3	0	4	10	20	-10
Brazil	3	0	1	2	4	7	-3
Brazil Olympic	1	0	0	1	0	1	-1
Chile	2	0	0	2	1	4	-3
Japan	2	2	0	0	5	0	+5
South Africa	1	0	0	1	0	6	-6
Soviet Union	1	0	1	0	2	2	0
Uruguay	3	0	1	2	4	8	-4
Total (8)	20	5	3	12	26	48	-22
