= Gustavo Silva (footballer, born 1989) =

Brazilian footballer

Personal information
- Full name: Gustavo Gomes da Silva
- Date of birth: 2 April 1989 (age 37)
- Place of birth: Campinas, Brazil
- Height: 1.94 m (6 ft 4 in)
- Position: Goalkeeper

Youth career
- 2008–2009: Figueirense

Senior career*
| Years | Team | Apps | (Gls) |
| 2009 | Figueirense | 1 | (0) |
| 2010–2012 | Ponte Preta | 12 | (0) |
| 2011 | → Red Bull Brasil (loan) | 0 | (0) |
| 2012 | → Marília (loan) | 1 | (0) |
| 2012 | → Remo (loan) | 7 | (0) |
| 2013 | Mirassol | 2 | (0) |
| 2013 | Botafogo-SP | 3 | (0) |
| 2014 | ABC | 0 | (0) |
| 2014 | Mirassol | 16 | (0) |
| 2014–2015 | Ituano | 1 | (0) |
| 2015 | → Rio Preto (loan) | | |
| 2016 | Mogi Mirim | 18 | (0) |
| 2017 | Passo Fundo | 6 | (0) |
| 2017–2018 | Barra-SC | 7 | (0) |
| 2019 | Mirassol | 3 | (0) |
| 2020 | Atibaia | 12 | (0) |
| 2020 | Costa Rica-MS | | |
| 2021 | EC São Bernardo | 6 | (0) |
| 2021 | Glória | 19 | (0) |
| 2022 | URT | 11 | (0) |
| 2022 | Amazonas | 11 | (0) |
| 2022 | Glória | | |
| 2023 | Democrata-SL | 7 | (0) |
| 2023 | Botafogo-PB | 7 | (0) |
| 2024 | Guarany de Bagé | 0 | (0) |
| 2024 | Glória | 11 | (0) |
| 2025 | Manaus | 21 | (0) |
- * Club domestic league appearances and goals as of 30 August 2025

Gustavo Gomes da Silva (born 2 April 1989), simply known as Gustavo Silva, is a Brazilian professional footballer who plays as a goalkeeper.

== Career ==
Gustavo Silva started his career at Figueirense in 2008, being champion of the Copa São Paulo de Juniores. and ascending to the professional team in 2009. In 2010 he went to the team from the city where he was born, AA Ponte Preta, where he competed in the 2010 Campeonato Paulista, and was even called to represent the São Paulo state football team that year. Afterwards, he ended up being loaned out, and in subsequent years Gustavo played for several clubs.

In 2021, Gustavo won the Copa FGF title with Glória de Vacaria. In te following season, was part of the Amazonas FC squad promoted to Série C. In 2023, played the 2023 Campeonato Brasileiro Série C for Botafogo-PB. In the 2025 season, Silva played for Manaus FC.

== Honours ==
Figueirense

- Copa São Paulo de Futebol Júnior (U20): 2008

Glória

- Troféu Dirceu de Castro: 2021
