= Áttila (footballer) =

Brazilian footballer

Personal information
- Full name: Áttila de Carvalho
- Date of birth: 16 December 1910
- Place of birth: Rio de Janeiro, Brazil
- Position: Striker

Senior career*
| Years | Team | Apps | (Gls) |
| 1928–1932 | America-RJ | | |
| 1933–1938 | Botafogo | | |
- * Club domestic league appearances and goals

Áttila de Carvalho (born 16 December 1910, date of death unknown), known as just Áttila, was a Brazilian football player. He has played for Brazil national team. De Carvalho is deceased.
