= Lagarto (footballer) =

Brazilian footballer (1898–1972)

Personal information
- Full name: Severino Franco da Silva
- Date of birth: 17 June 1896
- Place of birth: Pelotas, Brazil
- Date of death: 5 March 1972 (aged 75)
- Position: Forward

Senior career*
Years	Team	Apps	(Gls)
- Guarani
- Grêmio
- Fluminense

International career
1925	Brazil	4	(4)
- * Club domestic league appearances and goals

Severino Franco da Silva (17 June 1898 – 5 March 1972), known as Lagarto, was a Brazilian footballer who played as a forward. He made four appearances for the Brazil national team in 1925. He was also part of Brazil's squad for the 1925 South American Championship.
