= Nilo (footballer) =

Brazilian footballer (1903-1975)

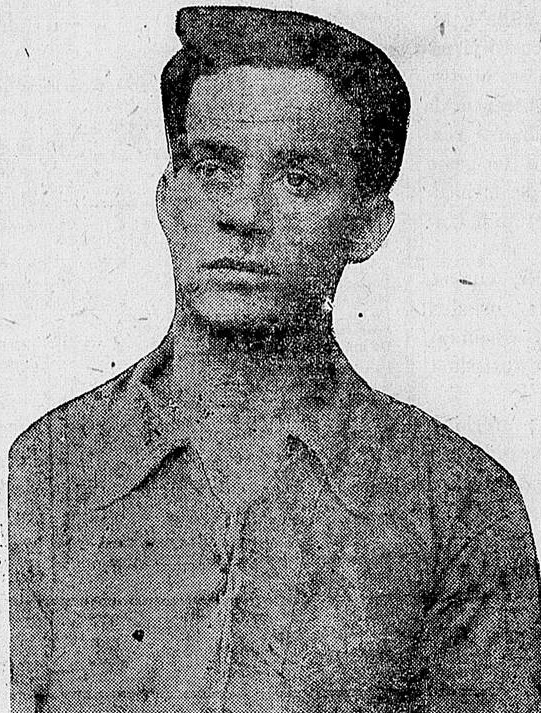
- Nilo in 1929

Personal information
- Full name: Nilo Murtinho Braga
- Date of birth: 3 April 1903
- Place of birth: Belém, Brazil
- Date of death: 7 February 1975 (aged 71)
- Place of death: Rio de Janeiro, Brazil
- Position: Forward

Senior career*
Years	Team	Apps	(Gls)
1918–1920	América-RN	?	(?)
1921–1924	Fluminense	60	(42)
1927–1937	Botafogo	201	(184)

International career
1923–1931	Brazil	19	(11)
- * Club domestic league appearances and goals

Nilo Murtinho Braga, known simply as Nilo (3 April 1903 – 7 February 1975) was a Brazilian association footballer who played in the forward striker role.

Although used to be regarded as a carioca, he was actually born another Brazilian state, Pará – and raised since childhood in Rio de Janeiro, like a famous niece of him, the actress Rosamaria Murtinho, who even became a Botafogo supporter due to his uncle importance in this club.

Nilo first played in Fluminense youth team, winning in 1916 Youth Rio de Janeiro Championship. Due to his father's transfer to work as harbourmaster at the port of Natal, Nilo would start in adult football by playing for América-RN in 1917, even scoring the goal that secured this club's first title at Rio Grande do Norte State Championship.

The family settled again in Rio de Janeiro, where he would play and being carioca champion for both Fluminense and Botafogo adult teams. He won six Rio de Janeiro State Tournament, four consecutives (1924, 1930, 1932, 1933, 1934, 1935) and for three time winning top goalscorer (in 1924, 1927 and 1933). For the Brazilian team, he participated in the 1930 FIFA World Cup, playing one match against Yugoslavia.

He died at 71 years old.

== Honours ==
=== Club ===
- Campeonato Carioca (6):

Fluminense: 1924
Botafogo: 1930, 1932, 1933, 1934, 1935

- Campeonato Potiguar (1):

América de Natal: 1919

=== National ===
- Copa Rio Branco (1):

Brazil: 1931

=== Individual ===
- Campeonato Carioca topscorer (3):

1924, 1927, 1933
