= List of Clube Atlético Mineiro players =

Clube Atlético Mineiro is a Brazilian professional football club based in Belo Horizonte, Minas Gerais, Brazil. The club has played in the Brasileirão, the top tier of the Brazilian football league system, throughout all of its history with the exception of one season, as well as in all editions of the Campeonato Mineiro, the premier state league of Minas Gerais, while also taking part in numerous CONMEBOL-organised international competitions. This is a list of notable footballers who have played for Atlético Mineiro since its foundation as Athletico Mineiro Football Club in 1908.

João Leite holds Atlético Mineiro's official appearance record, with 684. Reinaldo is the club's all-time leading goalscorer with 255 goals since joining the club's first squad in 1973. Dadá Maravilha comes in second with 211, the only other player to score over 200 goals for the team. Lucas Pratto is Atlético's all-time foreign goalscorer with 19 goals.

The list comprises players who have achieved notability through making a major contribution to the club as a player, such as being club captain, founder member, winning individual awards while at the club or being part of major honour winning squads. For a list of all Atlético Mineiro players, major or minor, with a Wikipedia article, see Category:Clube Atlético Mineiro players. For individual records (appearances and goalscorers) and individual recognitions see the statistics and records related article. For the current squad and its notable players, see the main Clube Atlético Mineiro article.

== List of players ==
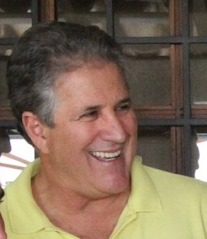
João Leite holds the record for most appearances for the club with 684

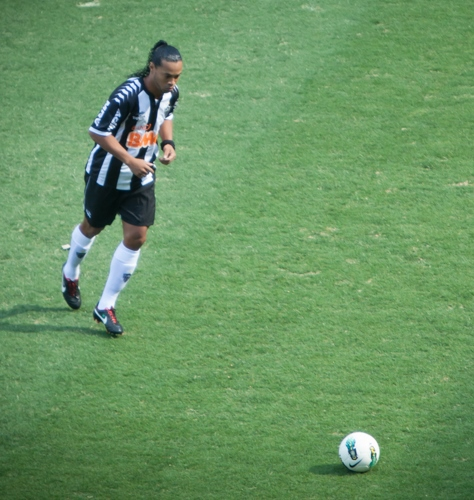
Ronaldinho won three trophies in two years with the club, including a Copa Libertadores

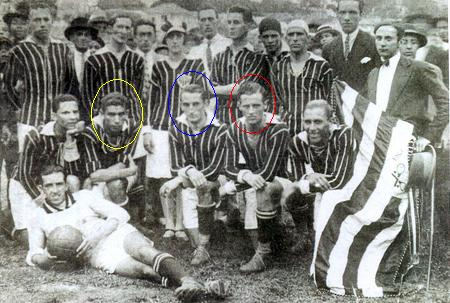
The "Trio Maldito" ("Unholy Trio", circled), composed of Mário de Castro, Said and Jairo, scored a total of 459 goals playing for Atlético Mineiro

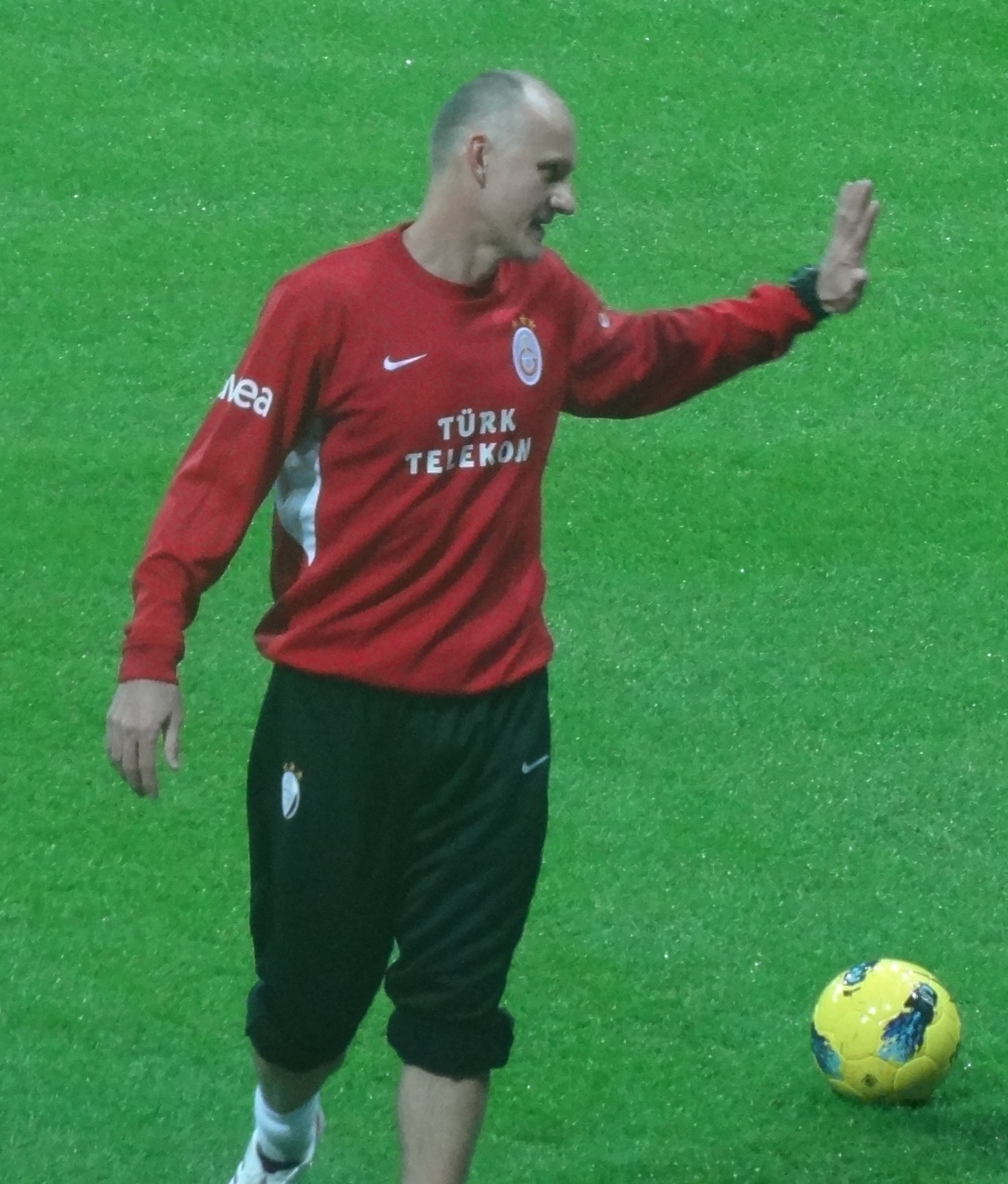
Cláudio Taffarel played four seasons with Atlético Mineiro, winning a Copa CONMEBOL and a Campeonato Mineiro

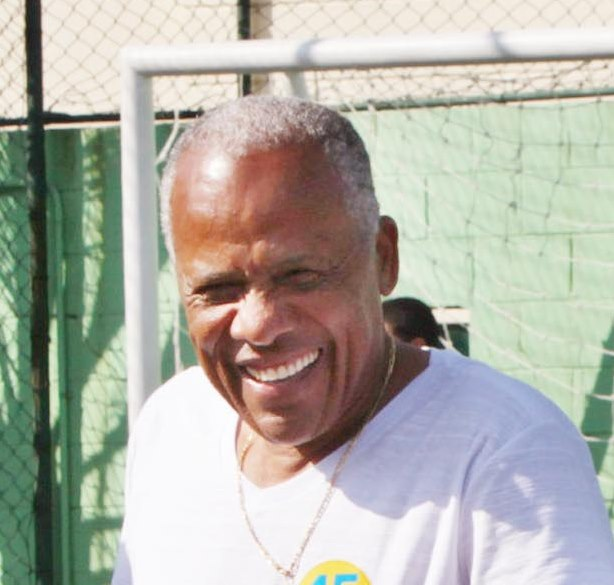
Dadá Maravilha, or simply Dario, won a Brasileirão with the club and scored 211 goals

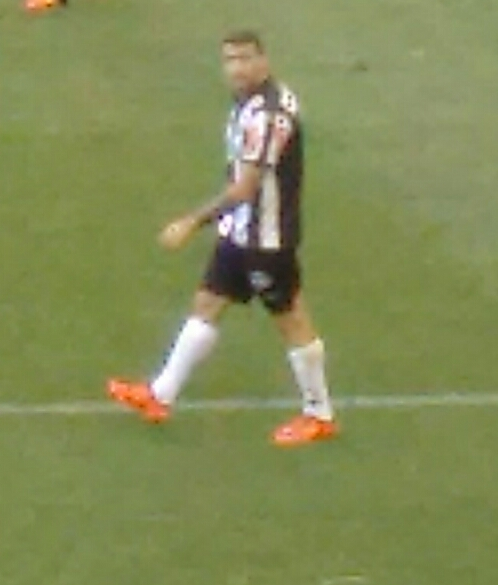
Lucas Pratto is Atlético's all-time foreign top goalscorer

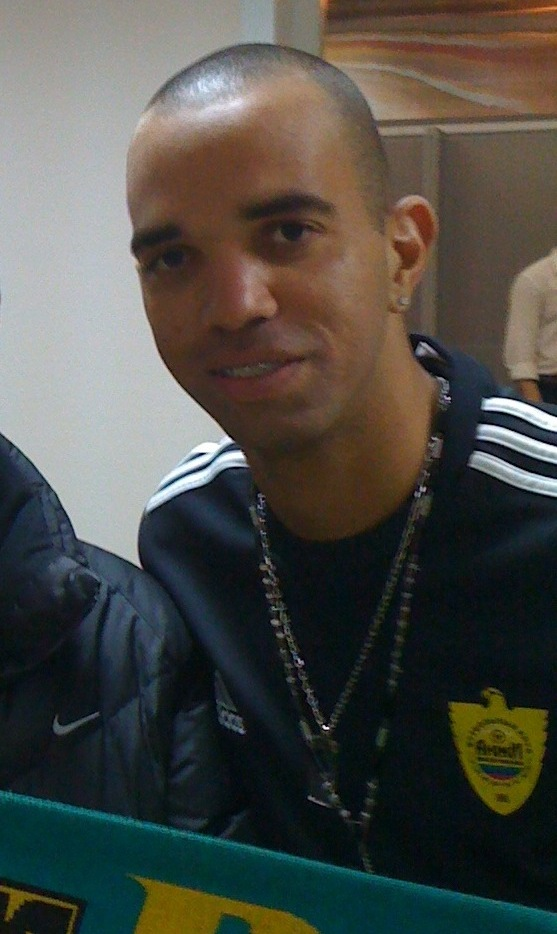
Diego Tardelli had two stints with the club, scoring more than 100 goals

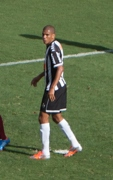
Leonardo Silva is the club's current captain and has the most appearances in the current squad

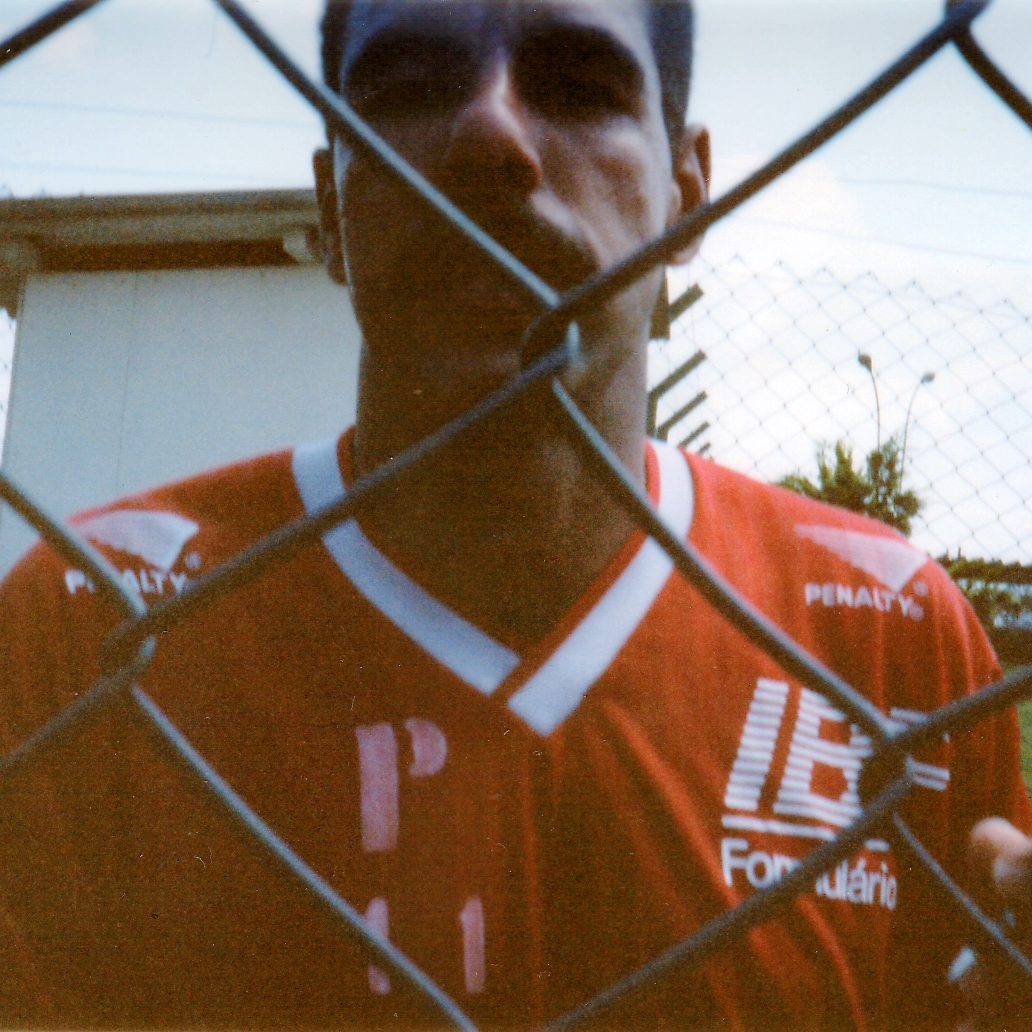
Toninho Cerezo played 400 matches and won the Bola de Ouro twice while at the club

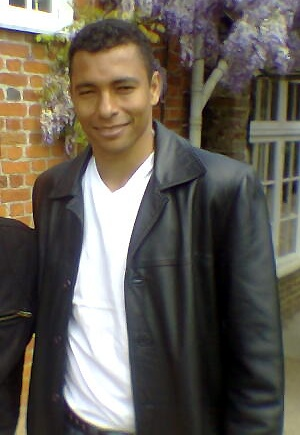
Gilberto Silva played for the club on two periods

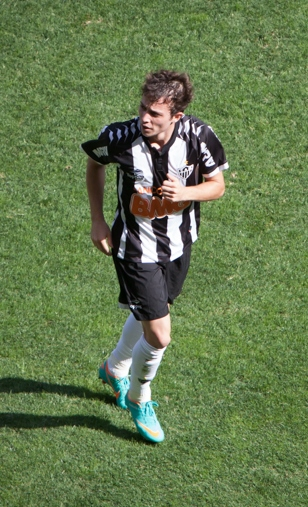
Bernard won a Copa Libertadores and is the club's record selling transfer

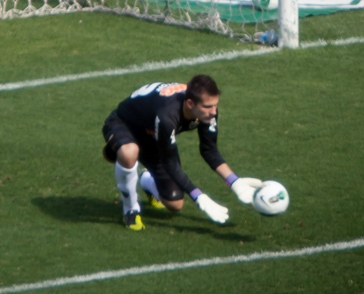
Victor has more than 200 appearances for Atlético Mineiro

Players are listed in alphabetical order according to the date of their first-team debut for the club. Appearances and goals include all matches for the club, substitute appearances included. A star denotes the player is included on the club's "Great Idols" list, according to its official website. Italics denote the player is currently at the club. International appearances are those at full international level, including substitutions.

Name	Nationality	Position	Club career	Apps.	Goals	Int'l apps. (at club)	Int'l apps. (overall)
Aníbal Machado	Brazil	Forward	1908–1909f				
Mário de Castro	Brazil	Forward	1926–1931	100	195		
Jairo	Brazil	Forward	1927–1933	—	122		
Said	Brazil	Midfielder	1927–1934	—	142		
Guará	Brazil	Forward	1933–1941	200	168		
Kafunga	Brazil	Goalkeeper	1935–1954	335	0		
Alvinho	Brazil	Forward	1938–1951; 1957–1960	234	100		
Tião	Brazil	Forward	1941–1943; 1947–1949	106	49		
Lucas Miranda	Brazil	Forward	1944–1954	258	152		
Nívio Gabrich	Brazil	Forward	1945–1952	182	126		
Mexicano	Brazil	Defender	1946–1949	116	1		
Mão de Onça	Brazil	Goalkeeper	1946–1952	95	0		
Zé do Monte	Brazil	Midfielder	1946–1956	320	25		
Carlyle	Brazil	Forward	1947–1948	68	53	3	3
Vavá	Brazil	Forward	1949–1953	118	58		
Ubaldo	Brazil	Forward	1950–1955; 1958–1961	274	135		
Oswaldo	Brazil	Defender	1950–1957	276	—		
Geraldo	Brazil	Defender	1951–1957	140	3		
Paulo Valentim	Brazil	Winger	1954–1956	51	31	0	5
William	Brazil	Defender	1954–1964	330	19		
Ilton Chaves	Brazil	Midfielder	1955–1960	200	9		
Mussula	Brazil	Goalkeeper	1958; 1968–1973	168	0	1	1
Fábio	Brazil	Goalkeeper	1959–1962; 1968	118	0		
Marcelino	Brazil	Defender	1960–1966	239	1		
Procópio Cardoso	Brazil	Defender	1962–1963; 1966	60	2		
Ronaldo Drummond	Brazil	Forward	1964–1972	270	66	1	1
Grapete	Brazil	Defender	1964–1975	486	0	1	1
Lôla	Brazil	Midfielder	1966–1972	196	51	1	1
Tião	Brazil	Forward	1966–1972	283	32	1	1
Beto	Brazil	Midfielder	1966–1973	142	29		
Wanderley Paiva	Brazil	Midfielder	1966–1975	559	32	7	7
Humberto Monteiro	Brazil	Defender	1967–1972	219	3		
Bibi	Brazil	Midfielder	1967–1973	104	14		
Lacy	Brazil	Forward	1967–1972	226	61		
Djalma Dias	Brazil	Defender	1968–1969	51	0	3	17
Vaguinho	Brazil	Forward	1968–1971; 1981	213	56	7	7
Dario	Brazil	Forward	1968–1972; 1974; 1978–1979	290	211	4	6
Héctor Cincunegui	Uruguay	Defender	1968–1973	194	1	0	1
Oldair	Brazil	Midfielder	1968–1973	282	61	0	1
Humberto Ramos	Brazil	Midfielder	1968–1973; 1976	110	12		
Romeu Evangelista	Brazil	Forward	1968–1976	267	43	6	6
Vantuir	Brazil	Defender	1968–1978	507	6	7	7
Zé Maria	Brazil	Defender	1968–1973	148	1		
Normandes	Brazil	Defender	1968–1974	168	0		
Pedrilho	Brazil	Forward	1969–1972; 1972–1974	18	1		
Renato	Brazil	Goalkeeper	1970–1972	86	0		
Getúlio	Brazil	Defender	1970–1977	205	27	9	9
Danival	Brazil	Midfielder	1970–1978	300	59	5	5
Ismael	Brazil	Forward	1970–1972	51	11		
Marcelo Oliveira	Brazil	Forward	1970–1979; 1983	285	104		
Ângelo	Brazil	Forward	1970–1980	238	12		
Zolini	Brazil	Goalkeeper	1971–1976; 1978–1979	20	0		
Spencer Coelho	Brazil	Defender	1971–1973	77	6		
Márcio Gugu	Brazil	Defender	1971–1979	262	9		
Raul Fernandes	Brazil	Defender	1971–1974	62	0		
Heleno	Brazil	Midfielder	1971–1985	379	25		
Guará	Brazil	Forward	1971–1972	53	6		
Salvador Almeida	Brazil	Forward	1971	7	0		
Ladislao Mazurkiewicz	Uruguay	Goalkeeper	1972–1974	89	0	—	36
Paulo Isidoro	Brazil	Midfielder	1973–1979; 1985–1987	399	98	5	36
Toninho Cerezo	Brazil	Midfielder	1973–1983; 1996–1997	400	53	52	57
Reinaldo	Brazil	Forward	1973–1985	475	255	37	37
Alves	Brazil	Defender	1975–1980	210	19		
Miguel Ángel Ortiz	Argentina	Goalkeeper	1976–1977	100	7		
João Leite	Brazil	Goalkeeper	1976–1988; 1991–1992	684	0	5	5
Renato	Brazil	Midfielder	1977–1984; 1986	213	29		
Luizinho	Brazil	Defender	1978–1989	537	21	34	34
Osmar Guarnelli	Brazil	Defender	1979–1983	222	0		
Jorge Valença	Brazil	Defender	1979–1987	333	13		
Palhinha	Brazil	Midfielder	1980–1981	77	27	0	16
Éder	Brazil	Winger	1980–1985; 1989–1990; 1994–1995	368	122	49	52
Sérgio Araújo	Brazil	Winger	1981–1989	360	58	10	10
Edivaldo	Brazil	Forward	1982–1987	164	27	2	3
Nelinho	Brazil	Defender	1982–1987	274	52	0	28
Walter Olivera	Uruguay	Forward	1983–1985	72	8	—	—
Elzo	Brazil	Midfielder	1984–1987	140	10	11	11
Everton Nogueira	Brazil	Midfielder	1984–1987	198	92		
Batista	Brazil	Defender	1985–1990	246	12	7	7
Marquinhos	Brazil	Midfielder	1985–1991; 1997	269	45	1	1
Renato	Brazil	Midfielder	1986–1989	205	59	2	22
Paulo Roberto Prestes	Brazil	Defender	1986–1996	504	38		
Aílton Delfino	Brazil	Forward	1987–1993	264	63		
Éder Lopes	Brazil	Midfielder	1987–1996	378	4		
Moacir	Brazil	Midfielder	1987–1993; 1996	199	24	6	6
Gerson	Brazil	Forward	1988–1991	149	92		
Cléber	Brazil	Defender	1989–1991	110	12	3	13
Paulo Sérgio	Brazil	Defender	1989–1994	72	2		
Carlos	Brazil	Goalkeeper	1990–1991	51	0	2	37
Leandro Tavares	Brazil	Midfielder	1992–1997	137	22		
Negrini	Brazil	Midfielder	1992–1994	67	11		
Valdir Benedito	Brazil	Midfielder	1992–1994; 1999–2000	222	14	0	3
Renaldo	Brazil	Forward	1993–1996	183	79	1	1
Cláudio Taffarel	Brazil	Goalkeeper	1994–1998	191	0	35	101
Cairo	Brazil	Midfielder	1995–2000	115	19		
Doriva	Brazil	Midfielder	1995–1997	143	6	3	12
Edgar	Brazil	Defender	1995–2004	185	15		
Euller	Brazil	Forward	1995–1997; 2005	167	62	0	11
Ronaldo Guiaro	Brazil	Defender	1995–1996	84	1		
Neguete	Brazil	Defender	1996–2003	92	4		
Bruno Heleno	Brazil	Defender	1996–2000	260	9		
Dedê	Brazil	Defender	1996–1998	92	3	0	1
Caçapa	Brazil	Defender	1997–2001	169	6	1	3
Lincoln	Brazil	Midfielder	1997–2001	186	38		
Marques	Brazil	Forward	1997–2002; 2005; 2008–2010	386	133	9	13
Valdir Bigode	Brazil	Forward	1997–2000	111	57		
Carlos Galván	Argentina	Defender	1998–1999	58	3		
Alexandre Gallo	Brazil	Midfielder	1999–2000	92	7		
Guilherme	Brazil	Forward	1999–2003	205	139	6	6
Juliano Belletti	Brazil	Midfielder	1999	28	10		
Kim	Brazil	Forward	1999–2003	113	21		
Mancini	Brazil	Defender; Winger	1999–2002; 2011–2012	174	27	0	9
Ronildo	Brazil	Defender	1999–2002	162	2		
Velloso	Brazil	Goalkeeper	1999–2004	231	1	0	1
Gilberto Silva	Brazil	Midfielder	2000–2002; 2013	122	9	14	93
Ramon Menezes	Brazil	Midfielder	2000–2002	94	28		
Cicinho	Brazil	Defender	2001–2003	96	7	0	15
Márcio Araújo	Brazil	Midfielder	2003–2009	224	14		
Rafael Miranda	Brazil	Midfielder	2003–2009	153	4		
Diego Alves	Brazil	Goalkeeper	2005–2007	61	0	0	8
Éder Luís	Brazil	Forward	2005–2009	161	43		
Julio César Cáceres	Paraguay	Defender	2005; 2010–2011	46	3	10	61
Danilinho	Brazil	Midfielder	2006–2008; 2012	145	38		
Marcos	Brazil	Defender	2006–2009	163	2		
Marinho	Brazil	Forward	2006–2008	68	28		
Leandro Almeida	Brazil	Defender	2007–2009	101	14		
Dejan Petković	Serbia	Midfielder	2008	32	5	0	6
Marcos Rocha	Brazil	Defender	2008–present	203	11	2	2
Serginho	Brazil	Midfielder	2008–2013	169	6		
Diego Tardelli	Brazil	Forward	2009–2011; 2013–2014	219	110	9	14
Bernard	Brazil	Winger	2010–2013	100	22	5	14
Neto Berola	Brazil	Winger	2010–2015	150	27		
Réver	Brazil	Defender	2010–2014	177	22	8	8
Giovanni	Brazil	Goalkeeper	2011–	55	0		
Guilherme	Brazil	Midfielder	2011–2015	147	27		
Leonardo Silva	Brazil	Defender	2011–	266	27		
Pierre	Brazil	Midfielder	2011–2015	170	0		
Richarlyson	Brazil	Midfielder	2011–2014	122	3	0	1
Jô	Brazil	Forward	2012–2015	127	39	17	20
Leandro Donizete	Brazil	Midfielder	2012–	170	2		
Ronaldinho	Brazil	Midfielder	2012–2014	88	28	3	97
Victor	Brazil	Goalkeeper	2012–	267	0	1	6
Jesús Dátolo	Argentina	Midfielder	2013–	122	18	0	3
Luan	Brazil	Winger	2013–2019	162	36		
Josué	Brazil	Midfielder	2013–2015	106	5	0	28
Jemerson	Brazil	Defender	2013–2016	101	8	0	0
Carlos	Brazil	Forward	2013–	100	20	0	0
Rafael Carioca	Brazil	Midfielder	2014–	123	5	0	0
Lucas Pratto	Argentina	Forward	2015–	100	41	3	3
Diego Costa	Spain	Forward	2021–	—	—		
