= Guara (disambiguation) =

Guará is a municipality in the state of São Paulo, Brazil.

Guara may also refer to:

== Places ==
- Guará Area of Relevant Ecological Interest, state of São Paulo, Brazil
- Guará, Federal District, Brazil
- Guará oil field, off the coast of Rio de Janeiro, Brazil
- Guará River in Bahia state, eastern Brazil

== Organisms ==
- Guara (moth), a genus of insects in the family Geometridae
- Guará wolf, or maned wolf, the largest canid of South America
- Scarlet ibis, a bird species from Latin America called guará in Tupi-Guarani

== People ==
- Guará (footballer, born 1916), full name Guaracy Januzzi (1916–1978), Brazilian footballer
- Paulinho Guará (born 1979), Brazilian footballer
- Guará (footballer, born 1946) (Paulo Roberto Durães de Castilho), Brazilian footballer

== Other uses ==
- AV-VB4 RE 4x4 GUARÁ, a Brazilian armoured personnel carrier
- Clube de Regatas Guará, a Brazilian football team
- De Tomaso Guarà, a sports car produced from 1993 to 2004
- Guara (centerboard), a hardwood component of Andean rafts
- Guara (Larense), an informal descriptive term for people from Lara State, Venezuela
- TV Guará (Francisco Beltrão)
