= Bibi (footballer) =

Brazilian footballer (born 1949)

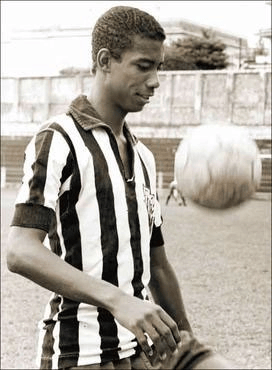

Personal information
- Full name: Adilson Pereira
- Date of birth: 29 December 1949 (age 76)
- Place of birth: Campos dos Goytacazes, Rio de Janeiro, Brazil
- Position: Midfielder

Youth career
- Estrela
- ???–1966: Fluminense

Senior career*
Years	Team	Apps	(Gls)
1967–1973	Atlético Mineiro	104	(14)
1972	→ Deportivo Italia (loan)		
1974–1977	Nacional		
1977–1979	Fortaleza		
1978–1979	→ Americano (loan)		
1979	Fast Clube		
1980–1981	Ferroviário		
1981	Avaí		
- * Club domestic league appearances and goals

Adilson Pereira (born 29 December 1949), more commonly known as Bibi is a retired Brazilian footballer. Playing as a midfielder, he was known for being the son of Brazilian international Didi as well as his career with Atlético Mineiro throughout the late 1960s to the early 1970s.

== Early life and career ==
Bibi was born on 29 December 1949 as the son of renowned Brazilian international football player and manager Didi and his first wife Maria Luíza do Espírito Santo. He would receive his nickname of "Bibi" from how it rhymed with his father's own nickname with it sticking with him for use in his professional career. Despite the violent divorce of his parents when Bibi was 4 years old, he would harbor no ill will towards his biological father. Like his father, he would pursue a football career, largely with support from his stepfather and former footballer Moacir Rodrigues. Following a career with local club Estrela, he would be successfully admitted into the youth ranks of Rio de Janeiro club Fluminense as his stepfather was good friends with club manager and former player Pinheiro. However, he would prematurely retire from the club, citing his desire to play for a club based in Minas Gerais where his mother lived.

== Senior career ==
Following his stint with Fluminense, he would play for Atlético Mineiro as he would make his immediate senior debut in a match against Botafogo in 1968 as the club had lost two midfielders within the same week with manager Telê Santana seeking replacements. He would make a great performance to where Bibi wouldn't play in the youth sector. During his career, Bibi would play as a substitute for Humberto Ramos and would later be a part of the winning squads for the 1970 Campeonato Mineiro and the 1971 Campeonato Brasileiro Série A. He would make several friends throughout his career with the club including Pedrilho, Antenor, Vaguinho, Renato and Lacy. In the following season, he would play abroad in Venezuela for Deportivo Italia to play in the 1972 Venezuelan Primera División where the club would win the tournament as well as play in the 1972 Copa Libertadores. His final season with the club would be during the 1973 Campeonato Brasileiro Série A as he would make 104 appearances and score 14 goals by the time of his departure.

Following his career with Atlético Mineiro, he would travel to Amazonas to play for Nacional. A highlight in Bibi's career would occur during the third phase in the 1975 Campeonato Brasileiro Série A as he would play in an away match against Fluminense where his biological father, Didi, was directing the club. Ultimately, Nacional would lose 4–0 but the two would meet following the match where Bibi would congratulate him and have a brief conversation with him before leaving for his next match. He would have notable stints with Fortaleza, Americano and Ferroviário before retiring with Avaí in 1981.

== Personal life ==
In contrast to his father, Bibi would retire from football to take care of his own son, Fábio who also played football alongside his nephews. He would manage several clubs across Saudi Arabia, Qatar and the United Arab Emirates as well as serve as the goalkeeper coach for the Thailand national football team during the 1980s. He worked as a taxi driver within São Pedro da Aldeia before relocating to the Lagos microregion to live with his son as well as with his granddaughters.
