= 2002 Campeonato Carioca =

Campeonato Carioca
- Season: 2002
- Champions: Fluminense
- Relegated: Entrerriense; CFZ; Cabofriense; Serrano; Portuguesa; São Cristóvão; Itaperuna
- Copa do Brasil: Vasco da Gama; Flamengo; Fluminense; Americano; Botafogo; Bangu
- Matches played: 148
- Goals scored: 459 (3.1 per match)
- Top goalscorer: Fábio (Volta Redonda) - 16 goals
- Biggest home win: Vasco da Gama 6-1 Entrerriense (April 24, 2002); Flamengo 6-1 Entrerriense (May 15, 2002)
- Biggest away win: Entrerriense 0-3 Vasco da Gama (February 6, 2002); Flamengo 1-4 Americano (February 27, 2002); Entrerriense 0-3 Fluminense (May 1, 2002); Entrerriense 0-3 Bangu (May 19, 2002); Madureira 0-3 Fluminense (May 26, 2002); Vasco da Gama 1-4 Bangu (June 2, 2002); Volta Redonda 1-4 Friburguense (June 8, 2002)
- Highest scoring: Vasco da Gama 6-1 Entrerriense (April 24, 2002); Flamengo 5-2 Olaria (April 28, 2002); Flamengo 6-1 Entrerriense (May 15, 2002); Volta Redonda 4-3 Vasco da Gama (May 19, 2002); Vasco da Gama 3-4 Americano (June 5, 2002)

The 2002 edition of the Campeonato Carioca kicked off on January 26 and ended on June 27, 2002. It is the official tournament organized by FFERJ (Federação de Futebol do Estado do Rio de Janeiro, or Rio de Janeiro State Football Federation. Only clubs based in the Rio de Janeiro State are allowed to play. Eighteen teams contested this edition. Due to multiple schedule conflicts with the Rio-São Paulo tournament that year, the big teams used mostly reserve teams in the first phase. Fluminense won the title for the 29th time, however, due to an incident in the semifinals, the title remained under dispute until 2009. Entrerriense, CFZ, Cabofriense, Serrano, Portuguesa, São Cristóvão and Itaperuna were relegated.

== System ==
The tournament was divided in five stages:

- Preliminary tournament: The five worst teams of the 2001 championship joined the champions and the runner-up of the Second Level; each team played against each other in a double round-robin format, and the best team would qualify to the main tournament.
- Taça Guanabara: The 12 clubs all played in single round-robin format against each other.
- Taça Rio: The 12 clubs all played in single round-robin format against each other.
- Second phase: The four best-placed teams in the Aggregate table of the Taças Guanabara and Rio and the 'big four' (Botafogo, Flamengo, Fluminense and Vasco), who qualified regardless of placing in the aggregate table, were divided into two groups of four, in which each team played once against the teams of its own group, and the two best place teams in each group qualified to the Semifinals.
- Semifinals and Finals: The semifinals would the played in a single match. in case of a tie, the team with the best season record would advance, and the Finals would happen in two matches, both played at the Maracanã Stadium.

== Championship ==
=== Preliminary phase ===
Pos	Team	Pld	W	D	L	GF	GA	GD	Pts	Qualification or relegation
1	Entrerriense	12	8	3	1	25	7	+18	27	Main tournament
2	CFZ	12	8	1	3	28	13	+15	25	Relegated
3	Cabofriense	12	7	3	2	30	20	+10	24	Relegated
4	Portuguesa	12	5	2	5	18	14	+4	17	Relegated
5	São Cristóvão	12	2	4	6	22	29	−7	10	Relegated
6	Serrano	12	2	2	8	12	21	−9	8	Relegated
7	Itaperuna	12	2	1	9	12	43	−31	7	Relegated

Updated to match(es) played on December 16, 2001. Source: RSSSF.com
Rules for classification: 1) points; 2) wins; 3) goal difference; 4) number of goals scored.

=== Taça Guanabara ===
Pos	Team	Pld	W	D	L	GF	GA	GD	Pts	Qualification or relegation
1	Americano	11	10	1	0	28	9	+19	31	Champions
2	Vasco da Gama	11	9	1	1	21	6	+15	28	
3	Volta Redonda	11	6	2	3	25	18	+7	20	
4	Madureira	11	5	2	4	20	17	+3	17	
5	Bangu	11	5	1	5	14	14	0	16	
6	Botafogo	11	4	3	4	23	23	0	15	
7	Olaria	11	4	2	5	14	22	−8	14	
8	Fluminense	11	3	3	5	15	17	−2	12	
9	Friburguense	11	2	3	6	14	20	−6	9	
10	América	11	3	0	8	14	23	−9	9	
11	Entrerriense	11	2	2	7	15	22	−7	8	
12	Flamengo	11	1	4	6	9	21	−12	7	

Updated to match(es) played on March 25, 2002. Source: RSSSF.com
Rules for classification: 1) points; 2) wins; 3) goal difference; 4) number of goals scored.

=== Taça Rio ===
Pos	Team	Pld	W	D	L	GF	GA	GD	Pts	Qualification or relegation
1	Americano	11	7	2	2	17	7	+10	23	Champions
2	Vasco da Gama	11	6	3	2	25	15	+10	21	
3	Volta Redonda	11	6	3	2	21	15	+6	21	
4	Friburguense	11	6	2	3	22	18	+4	20	
5	Fluminense	11	6	1	4	17	13	+4	19	
6	Botafogo	11	5	4	2	16	11	+5	19	
7	Flamengo	11	4	2	5	21	17	+4	14	
8	Bangu	11	4	2	5	14	14	0	14	
9	Madureira	11	4	0	7	13	21	−8	12	
10	América	11	3	2	6	17	19	−2	11	
11	Olaria	11	2	2	7	12	22	−10	8	
12	Entrerriense	11	0	3	8	8	31	−23	3	

Updated to match(es) played on May 29, 2002. Source: RSSSF.com
Rules for classification: 1) points; 2) wins; 3) goal difference; 4) number of goals scored.

=== Aggregate table ===
Pos	Team	Pld	W	D	L	GF	GA	GD	Pts	Qualification or relegation
1	Americano	22	17	3	2	44	16	+28	54	Qualified
2	Vasco da Gama	22	15	4	3	46	21	+25	49	Qualified
3	Volta Redonda	22	12	5	5	46	33	+13	41	Qualified
4	Botafogo	22	9	7	6	39	34	+5	34	Qualified
5	Fluminense	22	9	4	9	32	30	+2	31	Qualified
6	Bangu	22	9	3	10	28	28	0	30	Qualified
7	Friburguense	22	8	5	9	36	38	−2	29	Qualified
8	Madureira	22	9	2	11	33	38	−5	29	
9	Olaria	22	6	4	12	26	44	−18	22	
10	Flamengo	22	5	6	11	30	38	−8	21	Qualified
11	América	22	6	2	14	31	42	−11	20	
12	Entrerriense	22	2	5	15	25	53	−28	11	Relegated

Updated to match(es) played on May 29, 2002. Source: RSSSF.com
Rules for classification: 1) points; 2) wins; 3) goal difference; 4) number of goals scored.

=== Second phase ===
==== Group A ====
Pos	Team	Pld	W	D	L	GF	GA	GD	Pts	Qualification or relegation
1	Americano	3	2	1	0	7	5	+2	7	Qualified
2	Bangu	3	2	0	1	7	3	+4	6	Qualified
3	Botafogo	3	1	1	1	2	3	−1	4	
4	Vasco da Gama	3	0	0	3	4	9	−5	0	

Updated to match(es) played on June 9, 2002. Source: RSSSF.com
Rules for classification: 1) points; 2) wins; 3) goal difference; 4) number of goals scored.

==== Group B ====
Pos	Team	Pld	W	D	L	GF	GA	GD	Pts	Qualification or relegation
1	Fluminense	3	3	0	0	9	3	+6	9	Qualified
2	Friburguense	3	1	1	1	7	6	+1	4	Qualified
3	Flamengo	3	1	1	1	6	8	−2	4	
4	Volta Redonda	3	0	0	3	4	9	−5	0	

Updated to match(es) played on May 29, 2002. Source: RSSSF.com
Rules for classification: 1) points; 2) wins; 3) goal difference; 4) number of goals scored.

=== Semifinals ===
Team 1	Score	Team 2
Fluminense	0–0	Bangu
Americano	1–0	Friburguense

=== Finals ===
Team 1	Agg.	Team 2	1st leg	2nd leg
Fluminense	5–1	Americano	2–0	3–1
