= 2011 Military World Games =

Sports Event

- Host city: Rio de Janeiro, Brazil
- Motto: The Peace Games! (Os Jogos da Paz!)
- Nations: 108
- Athletes: 4,900
- Events: 195 in 20 sports
- Opening: 16 July 2011
- Closing: 24 July 2011
- Opened by: President Dilma Rousseff
- Athlete's Oath: SN Isabel Swan
- Judge's Oath: Sgt Marcelo de Lima Henrique
- Main venue: João Havelange Olympic Stadium

Summer

Winter

The 2011 Military World Games (Portuguese: Jogos Mundiais Militares de 2011), officially known as the 5th CISM Military World Games (Portuguese: V Jogos Mundiais Militares do CISM), was hosted from July 15–24, 2011 in Rio de Janeiro, Brazil.

The 5th Military World Games was the largest military sports event ever held in Brazil, with approximately 4,900 athletes from 108 countries competing in 20 sports. The Games were organized by the Military Sports Commission of Brazil (CDMB) and the military commands (Army, Navy and Air Force), in accordance with CISM regulations and the rules of the International Sports Federations.

== Organization ==
=== Bidding process ===
Brazil was chosen to host the 5th Military World Games during a meeting of the International Military Sports Council held in Ouagadougou, Burkina Faso, on May 25, 2007. Brazil won, by means of a ballot, the race against Turkey to host the 2011 games. Representatives from over 75 countries took part in the poll. Rio's existing sports infrastructure, the Brazilian expertise at hosting major events, and the support granted to the project by the local authorities were decisive for the Brazilian victory.

=== Infrastructure and budget ===
The athletes participating in the 5th Military World Games were accommodated in three athlete's villages (Green, Blue and White), all located in Rio de Janeiro. The Green Village was located in the neighborhood of Deodoro, the Blue Village in Campo dos Afonsos and the White Village in the district of Campo Grande. The villages were built to be a functional and diverse center, vital to the operations of the Military World Games. The three villages comprise 106 buildings, 1,206 apartments and 4,824 rooms, with capacity to accommodate about 6,000 athletes and 2,000 officials. The budget used for the construction of the three villages is of R$400 million.

=== Venues ===
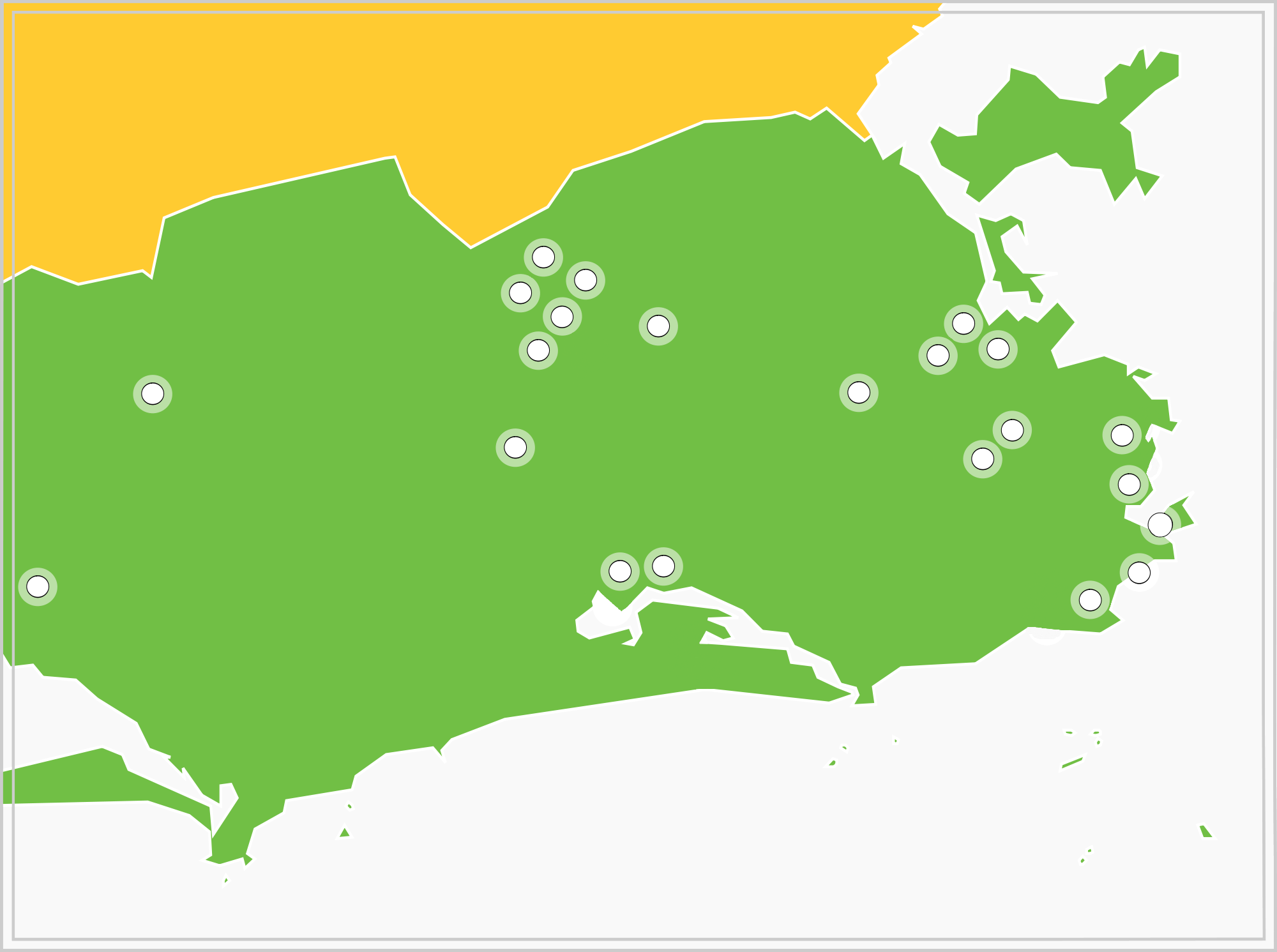

Twenty-seven competition venues were used during the 5th Military World Games, the majority located within Rio de Janeiro.

- 26th Parachutist Infantry Battalion – fencing and military pentathlon
- Air Force University – aeronautical pentathlon, football and judo
- CCEFx – football
- CEFAN – naval pentathlon and taekwondo
- CIAGA – football
- CIAMPA – boxing
- Copacabana Beach (Posto 2) – beach volleyball
- Copacabana Beach (Posto 6) – triathlon
- Flamengo Park – marathon
- Gericinó Instruction Center – military pentathlon
- João Havelange Olympic Stadium – athletics and football
- Maracanãzinho Arena – volleyball
- Maria Lenk Aquatic Center – swimming
- Modern Pentathlon National Center – modern pentathlon, military pentathlon
- National Equestrian Center – equestrian
- National Shooting Center – shooting, aeronautical pentathlon, and military pentathlon
- Navy Academy – sailing
- Rio Arena – basketball
- Rio de Janeiro Military School – volleyball
- Santa Cruz Air Force Base – military pentathlon (flying)
- São Januário Stadium – football

The venues located outside the city of Rio de Janeiro were the Resende Airport and the Academia Militar das Agulhas Negras located in Resende, the Avelar Instruction Center located in Paty do Alferes, the Mario Xavier National Forest located in Seropédica, and the Giulite Coutinho Stadium belonging to América Football Club located in Mesquita.

=== Media coverage ===
- Brazil: Band, BandSports, ESPN Brasil, Esporte Interativo, Rede Globo, SporTV and TV Brasil

== Participating nations ==
List of Participating Nations

Below is a list of the 108 participating nations (the number of competitors per delegation is indicated in brackets)

- Afghanistan (3)
- Albania (3)
- Algeria (56)
- Angola (6)
- Argentina (81)
- Austria (33)
- Azerbaijan (3)
- Bahrain (51)
- Bangladesh (1)
- Barbados (7)
- Belarus (34)
- Belgium (45)
- Bosnia and Herzegovina (14)
- Botswana (4)
- Brazil (368)
- Bulgaria (2)
- Burkina Faso (3)
- Burundi (5)
- Cameroon (27)
- Canada (128)
- Cape Verde (3)
- Chad (4)
- Chile (65)
- China (194)
- Colombia (127)
- Republic of the Congo (9)
- Ivory Coast (8)
- Croatia (4)
- Cyprus (35)
- Czech Republic (14)
- Denmark (52)
- Dominican Republic (7)
- Ecuador (57)
- Egypt (12)
- Eritrea (6)
- Estonia (14)
- Finland (40)
- France (92)
- Gabon (2)
- Gambia (3)
- Germany (167)
- Greece (26)
- Guinea (11)
- Guinea-Bissau (4)
- Hungary (4)
- India (147)
- Indonesia (27)
- Iran (37)
- Ireland (9)
- Italy (121)
- Jamaica (11)
- Jordan (4)
- Kazakhstan (29)
- Kenya (52)
- Kuwait (26)
- Latvia (6)
- Lebanon (8)
- Lesotho (3)
- Lithuania (18)
- Luxembourg (8)
- Macedonia (4)
- Mali (10)
- Malta (3)
- Mauritania (4)
- Montenegro (2)
- Morocco (44)
- Netherlands (7)
- Niger (3)
- Nigeria (9)
- North Korea (27)
- Norway (39)
- Oman (6)
- Pakistan (47)
- Paraguay (6)
- Peru (19)
- Poland (101)
- Portugal (1)
- Qatar (70)
- Romania (9)
- Saudi Arabia (34)
- Senegal (3)
- Serbia (10)
- Slovakia (7)
- Slovenia (18)
- South Africa (40)
- South Korea (75)
- Spain (4)
- Sri Lanka (61)
- Suriname (42)
- Sweden (61)
- Switzerland (37)
- Syria (20)
- Tanzania (3)
- Togo (3)
- Trinidad and Tobago (47)
- Tunisia (22)
- Turkey (41)
- Uganda (3)
- Ukraine (50)
- United Arab Emirates (29)
- United States (59)
- Uruguay (36)
- Uzbekistan (17)
- Venezuela (93)
- Vietnam (9)
- Yemen (2)
- Zambia (3)
- Zimbabwe (5)

== Sports ==
The competition comprised 20 sports, some of them appearing for the first time in military world games, such as beach volleyball.

- Aeronautical pentathlon (details)
- Basketball
- Beach volleyball
- Boxing
- Equestrian
- Fencing
- Football
- Judo
- Military pentathlon (details)
- Modern pentathlon
- Naval pentathlon (details)
- Orienteering (details)
- Parachuting (details)
- Sailing
- Shooting
- Swimming
- Taekwondo
- Track and field
- Triathlon
- Volleyball

== Games schedule ==
OC	Opening ceremony	●	Event competitions	1	Event finals	CC	Closing ceremony

July	15th Fri	16th Sat	17th Sun	18th Mon	19th Tue	20th Wed	21st Thu	22nd Fri	23rd Sat	24th Sun	Events
Ceremonies		OC								CC	
Aeronautical pentathlon			●	●	●	●	2				2
Athletics			2		1	5	9	8	10		35
Basketball			●	●	●	●	●	●	●	1	1
Beach volleyball			●	●	●	●	●	●	2		2
Boxing				●	●	●	●	●	10		10
Equestrian					1		1	●	1	3	6
Fencing					2	2	2	2	3	1	12
Football	●	●	●	●	●	●	●	●	1	1	2
Judo				2		4	3	3	4		16
Military pentathlon			●	●	●	●	4		2		6
Modern pentathlon						●	2	2	1		5
Naval pentathlon				●	●	●	4				4
Orienteering				●	2	4		2			8
Parachuting		●	●	●	●	●	●	●	8		8
Sailing				●	●	●	●	3			3
Shooting			●	●	4	4	●	4	4		16
Swimming			9	10	9	8					36
Taekwondo						4	4	4	4		16
Triathlon										5	5
Volleyball			●	●	●	●	●	●	2		2
Daily medal events			11	12	19	31	31	28	52	11	195
Cumulative total			11	23	42	73	104	132	184	195	
July	15th Fri	16th Sat	17th Sun	18th Mon	19th Tue	20th Wed	21st Thu	22nd Fri	23rd Sat	24th Sun	Events

== Medal table ==
The nations by number of gold medals are listed below. The host nation, Brazil, is highlighted.

* Host nation (Brazil)

Rank	Nation	Gold	Silver	Bronze	Total
1	Brazil (BRA)*	45	33	36	114
2	China (CHN)	37	29	34	100
3	Italy (ITA)	14	13	24	51
4	Poland (POL)	13	19	11	43
5	France (FRA)	11	3	4	18
6	South Korea (KOR)	8	6	8	22
7	North Korea (PRK)	7	2	3	12
8	Germany (GER)	6	19	11	36
9	Kenya (KEN)	6	5	5	16
10	Ukraine (UKR)	5	4	9	18
11	Iran (IRI)	5	3	4	12
12	Norway (NOR)	4	5	2	11
13	Qatar (QAT)	3	1	2	6
14	Chile (CHI)	2	4	2	8
15	Austria (AUT)	2	2	2	6
16	United States (USA)	2	1	3	6
17	Lithuania (LTU)	2	1	2	5
18	Belarus (BLR)	2	0	4	6
19	Latvia (LAT)	2	0	2	4
20	Sweden (SWE)	2	0	0	2
21	Morocco (MAR)	1	7	1	9
22	Turkey (TUR)	1	5	4	10
23	Kazakhstan (KAZ)	1	3	6	10
23	Venezuela (VEN)	1	3	6	10
25	Switzerland (SUI)	1	3	5	9
26	Slovenia (SLO)	1	2	6	9
27	Bahrain (BHR)	1	2	4	7
27	Finland (FIN)	1	2	4	7
29	Algeria (ALG)	1	2	3	6
30	Estonia (EST)	1	2	2	5
31	Netherlands (NED)	1	1	2	4
32	Syria (SYR)	1	1	0	2
33	Belgium (BEL)	1	0	2	3
33	Romania (ROU)	1	0	2	3
35	Canada (CAN)	1	0	1	2
35	Uganda (UGA)	1	0	1	2
37	Croatia (CRO)	1	0	0	1
37	Denmark (DEN)	1	0	0	1
37	Ecuador (ECU)	1	0	0	1
40	Greece (GRE)	0	5	3	8
41	Tunisia (TUN)	0	3	1	4
42	Dominican Republic (DOM)	0	1	2	3
43	Jordan (JOR)	0	1	1	2
44	Czech Republic (CZE)	0	1	0	1
44	Egypt (EGY)	0	1	0	1
44	Hungary (HUN)	0	1	0	1
47	India (IND)	0	0	3	3
48	Cameroon (CMR)	0	0	2	2
48	Namibia (NAM)	0	0	2	2
48	Sri Lanka (SRI)	0	0	2	2
48	Uruguay (URU)	0	0	2	2
52	Argentina (ARG)	0	0	1	1
52	Cyprus (CYP)	0	0	1	1
52	Pakistan (PAK)	0	0	1	1
52	Slovakia (SVK)	0	0	1	1
52	Spain (ESP)	0	0	1	1
52	Suriname (SUR)	0	0	1	1
Totals (57 entries)		197	196	241	634

== See also ==
- World Military Cup
