= 1976 Campeonato Brasileiro Série A =

Campeonato Brasileiro Série A
- Season: 1976
- Champions: Internacional (2nd title)
- Copa Libertadores de América: Cruzeiro (title holders); Internacional; Corinthians
- Matches: 411
- Goals: 950 (2.31 per match)
- Top goalscorer: Dario (Internacional) - 16 goals
- Biggest home win: Flamengo 8-1 Sampaio Corrêa (September 16, 1976)
- Highest scoring: Flamengo 8-1 Sampaio Corrêa (September 16, 1976)
- Average attendance: 17,010

The 1976 Campeonato Brasileiro Série A, (officially the II Copa Brasil) was the 21st edition of the Campeonato Brasileiro Série A. The championship had 54 clubs and followed the same rules of the 1975 championship. It was won by the holders Internacional.

== First phase ==
=== Group A ===
Pos	Team	Pld	W	D	L	GF	GA	GD	Pts	Qualification
1	Internacional	8	7	0	1	25	5	+20	20	Qualified to Second phase
2	Grêmio	8	5	2	1	14	5	+9	16	Qualified to Second phase
3	Santos	8	4	3	1	9	5	+4	12	Qualified to Second phase
4	Palmeiras	8	4	2	2	7	2	+5	11	Qualified to Second phase
5	Caxias	8	4	1	3	8	5	+3	11	Qualified to Group K on Second phase
6	Avaí	8	2	1	5	5	11	−6	6	Qualified to Group K on Second phase
7	Desportiva	8	2	1	5	5	14	−9	5	Qualified to Group K on Second phase
8	Figueirense	8	2	1	5	3	17	−14	5	Qualified to Group K on Second phase
9	Rio Branco-ES	8	0	1	7	3	15	−12	1	Qualified to Group K on Second phase

=== Group B ===
Pos	Team	Pld	W	D	L	GF	GA	GD	Pts	Qualification
1	Botafogo-SP	8	4	2	2	9	5	+4	12	Qualified to Second phase
2	Coritiba	8	4	2	2	9	7	+2	11	Qualified to Second phase
3	Atlético-PR	8	3	3	2	8	4	+4	11	Qualified to Second phase
4	São Paulo	8	3	3	2	8	5	+3	11	Qualified to Second phase
5	Cruzeiro	8	3	4	1	9	6	+3	11	Qualified to Group L on Second phase
6	Londrina	8	2	3	3	5	8	−3	7	Qualified to Group L on Second phase
7	Confiança	8	2	3	3	6	10	−4	7	Qualified to Group L on Second phase
8	Portuguesa	8	1	3	4	6	9	−3	6	Qualified to Group L on Second phase
9	Uberaba	8	1	3	4	4	10	−6	5	Qualified to Group L on Second phase

=== Group C ===
Pos	Team	Pld	W	D	L	GF	GA	GD	Pts	Qualification
1	Corinthians	8	5	3	0	12	3	+9	16	Qualified to Second phase
2	Fortaleza	8	4	3	1	12	5	+7	13	Qualified to Second phase
3	Guarani	8	2	6	0	7	2	+5	12	Qualified to Second phase
4	Remo	8	3	2	3	10	8	+2	11	Qualified to Second phase
5	Nacional-AM	8	3	3	2	6	8	−2	9	Qualified to Group M on Second phase
6	Ponte Preta	8	1	5	2	6	7	−1	8	Qualified to Group M on Second phase
7	Paysandu	8	2	2	4	7	14	−7	7	Qualified to Group M on Second phase
8	Rio Negro	8	1	3	4	6	11	−5	6	Qualified to Group M on Second phase
9	Ceará	8	0	3	5	2	10	−8	3	Qualified to Group M on Second phase

=== Group D ===
Pos	Team	Pld	W	D	L	GF	GA	GD	Pts	Qualification
1	Atlético Mineiro	8	5	2	1	15	7	+8	15	Qualified to Second phase
2	América-RJ	8	4	3	1	9	4	+5	13	Qualified to Second phase
3	Goiás	8	4	2	2	11	7	+4	11	Qualified to Second phase
4	Operário de Campo Grande	8	2	6	0	11	8	+3	11	Qualified to Second phase
5	Vasco da Gama	8	4	0	4	9	11	−2	9	Qualified to Group N on Second phase
6	Mixto	8	2	2	4	10	11	−1	7	Qualified to Group N on Second phase
7	Americano	8	2	3	3	8	10	−2	7	Qualified to Group N on Second phase
8	América-MG	8	1	2	5	8	9	−1	5	Qualified to Group N on Second phase
9	Goiânia	8	1	2	5	9	23	−14	4	Qualified to Group N on Second phase

=== Group E ===
Pos	Team	Pld	W	D	L	GF	GA	GD	Pts	Qualification
1	Vitória	8	5	2	1	11	3	+8	16	Qualified to Second phase
2	Bahia	8	4	4	0	11	2	+9	15	Qualified to Second phase
3	Botafogo	8	4	3	1	14	7	+7	14	Qualified to Second phase
4	Fluminense	8	4	2	2	13	6	+7	13	Qualified to Second phase
5	Botafogo-PB	8	3	3	2	6	6	0	10	Qualified to Group O on Second phase
6	CSA	8	2	4	2	10	11	−1	8	Qualified to Group O on Second phase
7	CRB	8	2	1	5	5	14	−9	6	Qualified to Group O on Second phase
8	Fluminense de Feira	8	1	1	6	6	14	−8	4	Qualified to Group O on Second phase
9	Treze	8	1	0	7	6	19	−13	2	Qualified to Group O on Second phase

=== Group F ===
Pos	Team	Pld	W	D	L	GF	GA	GD	Pts	Qualification
1	Flamengo	8	6	1	1	24	5	+19	18	Qualified to Second phase
2	Santa Cruz	8	5	2	1	12	5	+7	15	Qualified to Second phase
3	Sport	8	5	1	2	8	5	+3	12	Qualified to Second phase
4	América-RN	8	2	5	1	6	4	+2	10	Qualified to Second phase
5	Volta Redonda	8	2	4	2	9	10	−1	9	Qualified to Group P on Second phase
6	Náutico	8	2	2	4	8	10	−2	7	Qualified to Group P on Second phase
7	Flamengo-PI	8	1	4	3	7	11	−4	6	Qualified to Group P on Second phase
8	ABC	8	0	4	4	5	12	−7	4	Qualified to Group P on Second phase
9	Sampaio Corrêa	8	0	3	5	5	22	−17	3	Qualified to Group P on Second phase

== Second phase ==
=== Group G ===
Pos	Team	Pld	W	D	L	GF	GA	GD	Pts	Qualification
1	Internacional	5	4	1	0	11	1	+10	13	Qualified to Third phase
2	Botafogo	5	2	2	1	9	6	+3	8	Qualified to Third phase
3	Fluminense	5	2	1	2	7	6	+1	5	Qualified to Third phase
4	Fortaleza	5	1	2	2	5	8	−3	4	
5	América-RN	5	1	1	3	4	8	−4	3	
6	Goiás	5	0	3	2	2	9	−7	3	

=== Group H ===
Pos	Team	Pld	W	D	L	GF	GA	GD	Pts	Qualification
1	Grêmio	5	4	1	0	7	1	+6	10	Qualified to Third phase
2	Coritiba	5	3	1	1	5	2	+3	8	Qualified to Third phase
3	Corinthians	5	3	0	2	6	6	0	7	Qualified to Third phase
4	Operário de Campo Grande	5	2	0	3	5	5	0	6	
5	Botafogo	5	2	0	3	3	6	−3	4	
6	Sport	5	0	0	5	0	6	−6	0	

=== Group I ===
Pos	Team	Pld	W	D	L	GF	GA	GD	Pts	Qualification
1	Bahia	5	3	1	1	8	3	+5	9	Qualified to Third phase
2	Atlético Mineiro	5	2	3	0	11	5	+6	8	Qualified to Third phase
3	Santa Cruz	5	2	1	2	6	7	−1	6	Qualified to Third phase
4	Santos	5	2	2	1	5	5	0	6	
5	Atlético-PR	5	1	1	3	3	9	−6	3	
6	Remo	5	0	2	3	5	9	−4	2	

=== Group J ===
Pos	Team	Pld	W	D	L	GF	GA	GD	Pts	Qualification
1	Palmeiras	5	4	1	0	7	1	+6	11	Qualified to Third phase
2	Flamengo	5	4	0	1	10	3	+7	10	Qualified to Third phase
3	Guarani	5	3	0	2	11	6	+5	8	Qualified to Third phase
4	América-RJ	5	1	2	2	5	8	−3	5	
5	São Paulo	5	1	1	3	7	8	−1	4	
6	Vitória	5	0	0	5	2	16	−14	0	

=== Group K ===
Pos	Team	Pld	W	D	L	GF	GA	GD	Pts	Qualification
1	Caxias	4	1	3	0	5	1	+4	6	Qualified to Third phase
2	Avaí	4	2	2	0	2	0	+2	6	
3	Rio Branco-ES	4	2	2	0	2	0	+2	6	
4	Figueirense	4	1	0	3	4	8	−4	3	
5	Desportiva	4	0	1	3	1	5	−4	1	

=== Group L ===
Pos	Team	Pld	W	D	L	GF	GA	GD	Pts	Qualification
1	Portuguesa	4	3	1	0	9	2	+7	9	Qualified to Third phase
2	Cruzeiro	4	3	1	0	6	1	+5	8	
3	Uberaba	4	2	0	2	3	3	0	4	
4	Confiança	4	1	0	3	2	9	−7	2	
5	Londrina	4	0	0	4	3	8	−5	0	

=== Group M ===
Pos	Team	Pld	W	D	L	GF	GA	GD	Pts	Qualification
1	Ponte Preta	4	2	1	1	10	3	+7	7	Qualified to Third phase
2	Paysandu	4	2	1	1	5	5	0	6	
3	Ceará	4	1	2	1	3	3	0	4	
4	Rio Negro	4	1	2	1	2	3	−1	4	
5	Nacional-AM	4	0	2	2	3	9	−6	2	

=== Group N ===
Pos	Team	Pld	W	D	L	GF	GA	GD	Pts	Qualification
1	Vasco da Gama	4	3	1	0	9	5	+4	8	Qualified to Third phase
2	Mixto	4	3	0	1	8	3	+5	8	
3	Goiânia	4	1	1	2	6	8	−2	4	
4	Americano	4	1	0	3	7	8	−1	3	
5	América-MG	4	1	0	3	4	10	−6	2	

=== Group O ===
Pos	Team	Pld	W	D	L	GF	GA	GD	Pts	Qualification
1	CRB	4	2	2	0	6	3	+3	7	Qualified to Third phase
2	Botafogo-PB	4	2	1	1	10	8	+2	6	
3	Treze	4	2	0	2	3	4	−1	4	
4	Fluminense de Feira	4	1	2	1	4	4	0	4	
5	CSA	4	0	1	3	4	8	−4	1	

=== Group P ===
Pos	Team	Pld	W	D	L	GF	GA	GD	Pts	Qualification
1	Náutico	4	2	2	0	6	1	+5	7	Qualified to Third phase
2	Sampaio Corrêa	4	2	0	2	5	7	−2	6	
3	Flamengo-PI	4	1	2	1	3	5	−2	5	
4	Volta Redonda	4	1	2	1	2	3	−1	4	
5	ABC	4	1	0	3	6	6	0	3	

== Third phase ==
=== Group Q ===
Pos	Team	Pld	W	D	L	GF	GA	GD	Pts	Qualification
1	Internacional	8	6	0	2	19	6	+13	17	Qualified to Semifinals
2	Corinthians	8	5	2	1	12	5	+7	14	
3	Ponte Preta	8	5	0	3	7	6	+1	11	
4	Coritiba	8	4	1	3	8	8	0	10	
5	Palmeiras	8	2	4	2	10	8	+2	9	
6	Caxias	8	3	1	4	10	12	−2	8	
7	Botafogo-SP	8	3	0	5	8	13	−5	7	
8	Santa Cruz	8	2	2	4	14	20	−6	7	
9	Portuguesa	8	0	2	6	7	17	−10	2	

=== Group R ===
Pos	Team	Pld	W	D	L	GF	GA	GD	Pts	Qualification
1	Fluminense	8	6	1	1	13	6	+7	15	Qualified to Semifinals
2	Atlético Mineiro	8	4	2	2	13	4	+9	14	Qualified to Semifinals
3	Flamengo	8	4	2	2	14	7	+7	13	
4	Vasco da Gama	8	4	1	3	9	12	−3	10	
5	Guarani	8	3	2	3	11	11	0	9	
6	Náutico	8	2	2	4	8	12	−4	8	
7	Grêmio	8	2	2	4	10	14	−4	7	
8	Bahia	8	2	3	3	8	12	−4	7	
9	CRB	8	1	1	6	7	15	−8	4	

== Semifinals ==
5 December 1976

Fluminense (Rio de Janeiro (state))	1 – 1	(São Paulo (state)) Corinthians
Pintinho 18'		Ruço 29'

Maracanã, Rio de Janeiro (RJ)
Attendance: 146,043
Referee: (Bahia) Saul Schmitt Mendes

5 December 1976

Internacional (Rio Grande do Sul)	2 – 1	(Minas Gerais) Atlético Mineiro
Batista 73'; Falcão 90'		Vantuir 30'

Beira-Rio, Porto Alegre (RS)
Attendance: 59,800
Referee: (Pernambuco) Sebastião Rufino

== Finals ==
12 December 1976

Internacional (Rio Grande do Sul)	2 – 0	(São Paulo (state)) Corinthians
Dario 29'; Valdomiro 57'

Beira-Rio, Porto Alegre (RS)
Attendance: 84,000
Referee: (Rio de Janeiro (state)) José Roberto Wright

== Final standings ==
Pos	Team	Pld	W	D	L	GF	GA	GD	BP	Pts
1	Internacional	23	19	1	3	59	13	+46	15	54
2	Corinthians	23	13	6	4	31	17	+14	6	38
3	Atlético Mineiro	22	11	7	4	40	18	+22	8	37
4	Fluminense	22	11	7	4	34	19	+15	6	35
5	Flamengo	21	14	3	4	48	15	+33	10	41
6	Grêmio	21	11	5	5	31	20	+11	6	33
7	Palmeiras	21	10	7	4	24	11	+13	4	31
8	Bahia	21	9	8	4	27	17	+10	5	31
9	Coritiba	21	11	4	6	22	17	+5	3	29
10	Guarani	21	8	8	5	29	19	+10	5	29
11	Santa Cruz	21	9	5	7	32	32	0	5	28
12	Vasco da Gama	20	11	2	7	27	28	−1	3	27
13	Botafogo-SP	21	9	4	8	26	24	+2	5	27
14	Ponte Preta	20	8	6	6	23	16	+7	4	26
15	Caxias	20	8	5	7	23	18	+5	4	25
16	Náutico	20	6	6	8	22	23	−1	4	22
17	CRB	20	5	4	11	18	32	−14	3	17
18	Portuguesa	20	4	6	10	22	28	−6	3	17
19	Botafogo-RJ	13	6	3	4	17	13	+4	3	18
20	Santos	13	6	5	2	14	10	+4	1	18
21	América-RJ	13	5	5	3	14	12	+2	3	18
22	Fortaleza	13	5	5	3	17	13	+4	2	17
23	Operário-CG	13	4	6	3	16	13	+3	3	17
24	Vitória	13	5	2	6	13	19	−6	4	16
25	São Paulo	13	4	4	5	15	13	+2	3	15
26	Atlético Paranaense	13	4	4	5	11	13	−2	2	14
27	Goiás	13	4	5	4	13	16	−3	1	14
28	Remo	13	3	4	6	15	17	−2	3	13
29	América de Natal	13	3	6	4	10	12	−2	1	13
30	Sport	13	5	1	7	8	11	−3	1	12
31	Cruzeiro	12	6	5	1	15	7	+8	2	19
32	Botafogo-PB	12	5	4	3	16	14	+2	3	17
33	Mixto	12	5	2	5	18	14	+4	3	15
34	Paysandu	12	4	3	5	12	19	−7	2	13
35	Volta Redonda	12	3	6	3	11	13	−2	1	13
36	Avaí	12	4	3	5	7	11	−4	1	12
37	Nacional-AM	12	3	5	4	9	17	−8	0	11
38	Flamengo-PI	12	2	6	4	10	16	−6	1	11
39	Americano	12	3	3	6	15	18	−3	1	10
40	Rio Negro	12	2	5	5	8	14	−6	1	10
41	Uberaba	12	3	3	6	7	13	−6	0	9
42	Confiança	12	3	3	6	8	19	−11	0	9
43	CSA	12	2	5	5	14	19	−5	0	9
44	Sampaio Corrêa	12	2	3	7	10	29	−19	2	9
45	Figueirense	12	3	1	8	7	25	−18	1	8
46	Fluminense de Feira	12	2	3	7	10	18	−8	1	8
47	Goiânia	12	2	3	7	15	31	−16	1	8
48	América Mineiro	12	2	2	8	12	19	−7	1	7
49	Londrina	12	2	3	7	8	16	−8	0	7
50	Rio Branco-ES	12	2	3	7	5	15	−10	0	7
51	ABC	12	1	4	7	11	18	−7	1	7
52	Ceará	12	1	5	6	5	13	−8	0	7
53	Treze	12	3	0	9	9	23	−14	0	6
54	Desportiva Capixaba	12	2	2	8	6	19	−13	0	6

Source: rsssf.com
