= Bernardo Rabello =

Brazilian model and first trans candidate for Mister Brazil

- Born: 4 July 1995 (age 31); Rio de Janeiro, Brazil
- Occupations: Model, physical trainer, beauty pageant competitor

Bernardo Rabello (born 4 July 1995) is a model and personal trainer, known for being the first trans man to participate in the beauty pageant Mister Brasil CNB.

== Biography ==
Bernardo Rabello was born in Río de Janeiro on 4 July 1995. He is licensed in physical education and is a personal trainer by profession. He also works as a model for the agencies Base MGT, in São Paulo, and for 40 Graus Models, in his hometown. In 2005 he moved with his family to the neighborhood of Resende, where he lived with his psychologist mother and military stepfather.

In 2019 he competed in Mister Rio de Janeiro, and two years later, in 2021, he earned the title of Mister Brasil Trans, a competition held in Río de Janeiro where Rabello represented his hometown. Rabello resigned to one of the prizes, a mastectomy, because it was incompatible with his desire to be a father and breastfeeding his children.

In 2025 he participated in the beauty pageant Mister Brasil CNB, representing Sul Fluminense. He faced 28 competitors between 2 and 6 April on the Camboriú Beach, but he did not win the title.

== Personal life ==
When he was 22, Rabello came out as lesbian, however he started his gender transition with hormone therapy in 2017.

He maintained a relationship with the photographer and speech therapist Michelle Dantas.
