= Pedrilho =

Brazilian footballer (born 1949)

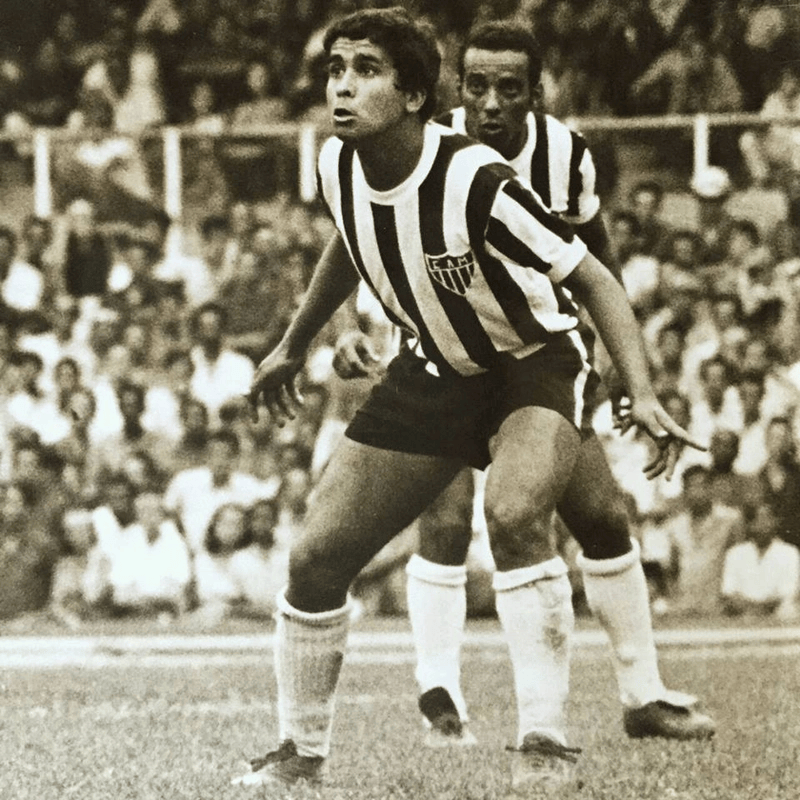
- Pedrilho in 1971

Personal information
- Full name: Pedrilho Gonçalves Filho
- Date of birth: 13 November 1949 (age 76)
- Place of birth: Pedro Leopoldo, Minas Gerais, Brazil
- Position: Forward

Youth career
- Pedro Leopoldo
- 1968–1969: Atlético Mineiro

Senior career*
Years	Team	Apps	(Gls)
1969–1972	Atlético Mineiro		
1972	→ Nacional (loan)		
1973–1974	Atlético Mineiro		
1974–1975	→ Nacional (loan)		
- * Club domestic league appearances and goals

Pedrilho Gonçalves Filho (born 13 November 1949), more commonly known as just Pedrilho is a retired Brazilian football player and trainer. Nicknamed "Petráš", he played as a forward for Atlético Mineiro and Nacional throughout his short-lived career as a player. He also served as a trainer within the Federal University of Minas Gerais.

== Career ==
Born and raised in Pedro Leopoldo, Pedrilho began his career in 1967 within the youth sector of Pedro Leopoldo FC. His talents would catch the interest of Atlético Mineiro who would then sign for him for his senior debut for the 1969 season in a 2–1 victory against Uberaba with Pedrilho himself scoring one of two goals. He would earn his nickname of "Petráš" as he would imitate 1970 FIFA World Cup Czechoslovak international Ladislav Petráš' signature goal celebration of kneeling down and made the sign of the cross. However, competition within the club was high as following Lola's injury, he hoped to play with club icon Dadá Maravilha but manager Telê Santana would prefer to use Spencer Coelho, Beto and Lacy over him. Nonetheless, he would play in nine games for the Galo's campaign to eventually become national champions in the 1971 Campeonato Brasileiro Série A.

At the start of the 1972 season, Pedrilho was riddled with injuries that kept him off the pitch for more than 90 days. By the time he returned, he would be a part of a series of loans to Amazonas-based club Nacional alongside Lacy, Campos, Danival and Ismael. He would return to Atlético Mineiro in the following 1973 season but would persistently face knee strain. He was thus once more loaned to Nacional with Paulo Isidoro, Ângelo and Ismael in 1974 and remained with the club until 1975 as he retired prematurely at the age of 25.

== Later life ==
Pedrilho would later pass the entrance exam to become a physical trainer at the Federal University of Minas Gerais. He would train within the youth sector of América Mineiro where he would train up youth talent such as Wellington Fajardo, Aquiles, Osmar and Cléver who would all become professional footballers. He also worked at Santa Tereza, the youth team of Minas Gerais and the youth sector of Atlético Mineiro. He is also a member of the Association of Former Athletes of Clube Atlético Mineiro (AEXCAM).
