= Guaro =

The Spanish term guaro can mean one of the following:

- Guaro (drink), a sugar cane-distilled alcoholic drink produced in parts of Central America and Colombia
- Guaro (Larense), a folkloric way to call the inhabitants of Lara State, Venezuela
- Guaro (Spain), a municipality in the Malaga province
- Loro guaro (orange-winged amazon, Amazona amazonica), a South American parrot
