= Raul Fernandes =

Brazilian footballer (born 1941)

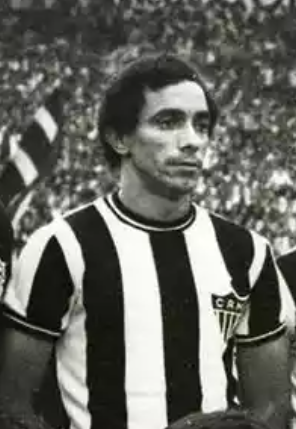
- Raul Fernandes in 1972

Personal information
- Full name: Raul Fernandes da Costa Filho
- Date of birth: 2 December 1941 (age 84)
- Place of birth: Belo Horizonte, Minas Gerais, Brazil
- Position: Defender

Youth career
- ???–1967: Monte Castelo

Senior career*
Years	Team	Apps	(Gls)
1962–1965	Cruzeiro	33	(0)
1965–1967	Democrata		
1968–1970	Cruzeiro	60	(0)
1971–1974	Atlético Mineiro	62	(0)
- * Club domestic league appearances and goals

Raul Fernandes da Costa Filho (born 2 December 1941), known simply as Raul Fernandes is a retired Brazilian footballer. He was known for playing as a defender for Cruzeiro and Atlético Mineiro throughout the 1960s and the early 1970s.

== Career ==
Raul Fernandes would begin his career by playing for Cruzeiro in 1962 to 1965 as he would then have a spell for Democrata for the rest of the 1965 season and continue until 1967. The following year, he would return to play for Cruzeiro as his second spell with the club with his debut in this new spell being the inaugural match of the 1968 Torneio Roberto Gomes Pedrosa in 2–2 draw against Portuguesa at the Mineirão. He would then be promoted to the starting XI of Cruzeiro during the 1969 Campeonato Brasileiro Série A. His last game with the club would occur on 11 October 1970 in a 4–2 victory against Londrina at the Estádio Vitorino Gonçalves Dias.

He would then be signed to play for Atlético Mineiro as a reserve in 1971 following a mass exodus of players from Cruzeiro beginning in the early 1970s. He would be a part of the winning squad for the 1971 Campeonato Brasileiro Série A. However, his age was becoming apparent throughout this time as in 1972, despite making the starting XI, he was beginning to get substituted for younger players. He would play his last game on 20 November 1974 during the annual Campeonato Mineiro in a 8–0 victory against Nacional de Muriaé as he would make 62 appearances for the club.
