= Zé Maria (footballer, born 1948) =

Brazilian footballer (born 1947)

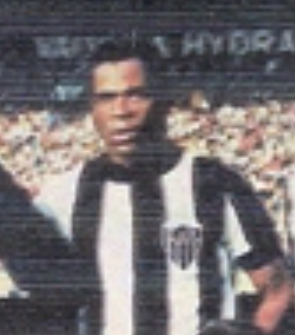
- Zé Maria in 1971

Personal information
- Full name: José Maria Pena
- Date of birth: 27 December 1948
- Place of birth: São Bernardo do Campo, São Paulo, Brazil
- Date of death: 1 May 2019 (aged 70)
- Place of death: Belo Horizonte, Minas Gerais, Brazil
- Position: Full-back

Senior career*
Years	Team	Apps	(Gls)
1968–1973	Atlético Mineiro	146	(1)
1974	Coritiba		
1975	Náutico Capibaribe		
1976	Brasil de Pelotas		
1977	Botafogo Futebol Clube		
1978	Figueirense		
1979	Deportivo Italia		

Managerial career
- 1980: Sete de Setembro
- 1985: Treze
- 1987: Americano
- 1991: Democrata–GV
- 1994: Sete de Setembro
- 2001: Atlético Mineiro
- 2004–2005: URT
- 2005: Democrata–GV
- 2006: Tupi
- 2007: Democrata–GV
- 2009: URT
- 2009: Uberlândia
- 2010: Funorte
- 2012: Democrata–GV
- 2013: Democrata–GV
- * Club domestic league appearances and goals

José Maria Pena (27 December 1948 – 1 May 2019), more commonly known as Zé Maria was a Brazilian football player and manager. As a player, he was most known for his career with Atlético Mineiro throughout the late 1960s and early 1970s as he would be a part of the winning squad for the club's first title in the 1971 Campeonato Brasileiro Série A.

== Career as a player ==
He began his career with his most notable role with Atlético Mineiro in 1968. During his career, he would play 146 games for Galo and scored a single goal. He would experience considerable success with the club, being part of the winning squads for the 1970 Campeonato Mineiro and 1971 Campeonato Brasileiro Série A as well as be part of the winning squads for three editions of the Copa Belo Horizonte. He would also play for Coritiba, Náutico Capibaribe where he would win the 1975 Torneio Início de Pernambuco, Brasil de Pelotas, Botafogo Futebol Clube and Figueirense throughout the remainder of the 1970s. He would then travel abroad to Venezuela as he would retire following his spell with Deportivo Italia for the 1979 Venezuelan Primera División.

== Career as a manager ==
After retirement, he began his coaching career at Sete de Setembro in Belo Horizonte in 1980. Among the teams he coached such as Al Ahli, Cruzeiro, América, Caldense and Americano, he also served as an assistant coach for the Atlético Mineiro during the 1999 Campeonato Brasileiro Série A and managed for 7 games in 2001.

In 1987, he coached Americano, whose squad was used to represent Rio de Janeiro in the final phase of the 1987 Campeonato Brasileiro de Seleções Estaduals. His team would end up winning the tournament, beating the São Paulo team in the final.

However, he stood out in teams within the interior of Minas Gerais, mainly URT and Democrata–GV, whose fans nicknamed him "Zé Milagre" after taking the club from the bottom of its group and qualifying it for the final quadrangular. In the same year, he received the title of citizen of Valadarense.

Zé Maria also commanded Tupi in 2006, Uberlândia in 2009 and Funorte in 2010. He died in Belo Horizonte, at the age of 70 from diabetes complications.
