= Zolini (footballer) =

Brazilian footballer (1951–2015)

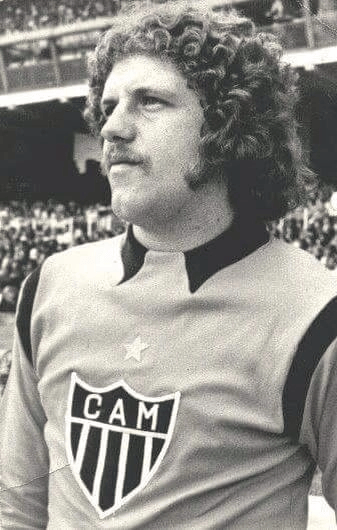
- Zolini in 1975

Personal information
- Full name: Ronaldo Zolini
- Date of birth: 29 December 1951
- Place of birth: Belo Horizonte, Minas Gerais, Brazil
- Date of death: 14 December 2015 (aged 63)
- Place of death: Belo Horizonte, Minas Gerais, Brazil
- Position: Goalkeeper

Youth career
- 1969–1970: Atlético Mineiro

Senior career*
| Years | Team | Apps | (Gls) |
| 1971–1976 | Atlético Mineiro | | |
| 1977 | América de Rio Preto | | |
| 1978–1979 | Atlético Mineiro | | |
- * Club domestic league appearances and goals

Ronaldo Zolini (29 December 1951 – 14 December 2015), more commonly known as just Zolini was a Brazilian footballer. He played as a goalkeeper throughout the 1970s for Atlético Mineiro, being part of the winning squad for the 1971 Campeonato Brasileiro Série A.

== Career ==
Zolini began his career within the youth sector of Atlético Mineiro beginning in 1969 as he would soon make his senior debut two years later. Immediately, he would be a part of the winning squad for the 1971 Campeonato Brasileiro Série A and throughout his career with the club, he also would be a part of the winning squads for the 1971 and 1972 editions of the Taça Belo Horizonte, the 1975 and 1976 editions of the Taça Minas Gerais and the 1976 Campeonato Mineiro. the following season, he would briefly play for América de Rio Preto but would return to Atlético Mineiro by 1978, retiring from professional football the following year at the age of 29.

== Later life ==
Following his football career, he worked as a sales representative for a security form company. He was also married to his wife Angela, with whom he had two children: Graziela and Guilherme as well as three grandchildren: Beatriz, Giovanna and Manuella. Before his death on 14 December 2015 from an pulmonary embolism, he enthusiastically worked on an autobiographical novel titled Memórias de um ex-goleiro. His daughter Graziela would resume the project and would oversee its launch on 1 March 2016.
