= Lacy (footballer) =

Brazilian footballer (1948–2000)

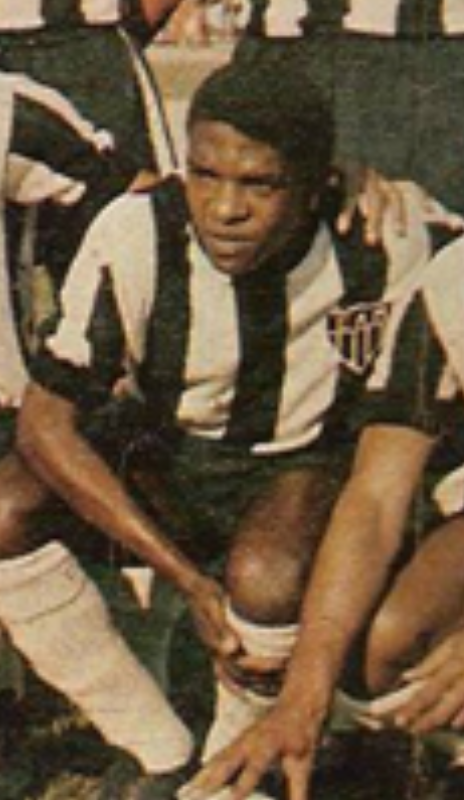
- Lacy in 1971

Personal information
- Full name: Lacy Gomes Guimarães
- Date of birth: 23 April 1948
- Place of birth: Belo Horizonte, Minas Gerais, Brazil
- Date of death: 21 July 2000 (aged 52)
- Position: Forward

Youth career
- ???–1967: Monte Castelo

Senior career*
Years	Team	Apps	(Gls)
1967–1972	Atlético Mineiro	226	(61)
1972	→ Nacional (loan)		
1973	Corinthians	1	(0)
1973	Comercial–MS		
1973–1974	Valério–MG		
1975	Operário–MS		
1976–1977	Inter–SM		
1977	Santo Ângelo		
- * Club domestic league appearances and goals

Lacy Gomes Guimarães (23 April 1948 – 21 July 2000), more commonly known as simply Lacy, was a Brazilian footballer. Sometimes also referred to as "Laci", he was most well known for playing for Atlético Mineiro throughout the late 1960s to the early 1970s, playing as a forward.

== Career ==
Lacy was born on 23 April 1948 at Belo Horizonte as the son of Levi Gomes and Geralda Gomes Guimarães. Raised in the Gameleira neighborhood, he played for a local club known as Monte Castelo until he signed for the amateur ranks of Atlético Mineiro in 1967.

Following a fracture in his fibula, he enjoyed consistent participation within the tournament, playing alongside 1970 FIFA World Cup players Dadá Maravilha and Tostão. He also played in the 2–1 victory against Brazil on 3 September 1969. However, these high rates of success led to a lack of personal discipline; as Lacy would later train poorly, ignore the risk of muscle weakening and not get proper sleep due to the allures of nightlife.

Even with a treatment to his knee and his successes in the annual Taça Belo Horizonte and the Campeonato Mineiro, it did not take long for his knee to weaken once again. His meniscus was removed, he spent a few months in a cast, and his leg languished.

He continued his career with Atlético Mineiro by winning the 1971 Campeonato Brasileiro Série A and was loaned out to Nacional in the second half of the 1972 season. By the time his tenure with the club ended, he had made 226 appearances with 61 goals being scored.

He initially signed to play for Corinthians at the beginning of their 1973 season at the personal request of club manager Yustrich. However, as he only made one appearance for the club, the realistic odds of his return to Minas Gerais began to dissipate. For the next two seasons, he played for Comercial–MS and Valério–MG.

Despite the support of Atlético Mineiro manager and friend Mussula in trying to bring him for the 1975 season, he was again unable to play for the club. He spent the last years of his career playing for Operário–MS, Inter–SM and Santo Ângelo before retiring in 1977.

He died on 21 July 2000 and is survived by his two daughters: Patrícia and Mariana Gomes.
