= Ruço =

Brazilian footballer

Personal information
- Full name: José Carlos dos Santos
- Date of birth: 3 June 1949
- Place of birth: Rio de Janeiro, Brazil
- Date of death: 2 September 2012 (aged 63)
- Place of death: Rio de Janeiro, Brazil
- Positions: Defender; defensive midfielder

Youth career
- Madureira

Senior career*
Years	Team	Apps	(Gls)
1971–1975	Madureira		
1974	→ Remo (loan)		
1975–1978	Corinthians	201	(22)
1979	Botafogo		
1979–1980	Cruzeiro		
1980–1981	Juventus-SP		
1981	Volta Redonda		
1982–1983	Rio Branco-ES		
1983	Remo		
1983	Bonsucesso		
- * Club domestic league appearances and goals as of 30 September 2024

José Carlos dos Santos (3 June 1949 – 2 September 2012), better known by the nickname Ruço, was a Brazilian professional footballer who played as a defender and defensive midfielder.

== Career ==
Revealed by Madureira EC, Ruço became famous playing for Corinthians, by scoring the goal against Fluminense FC in the semi-finals of the 1976 Campeonato Brasileiro Série A, and for being part of the state champion squad in 1977. He made 201 appearances and scored 22 goals for the club.

== Death ==
Ruço died on 2 September 2012, at the age of 63, in the neighborhood of Madureira, Rio de Janeiro, after an ischemic accident due to a medicine for the treatment of gout.

== Honours ==
Corinthians

- Campeonato Paulista: 1977

Rio Branco

- Campeonato Capixaba: 1983
