= TV Rio Sul =

TV Rio Sul (ZYB 524)
- Resende, Rio de Janeiro; Brazil
- Channels: Digital: 28 (UHF); Virtual: 13

Programming
- Affiliations: TV Globo

Ownership
- Owner: Rabbit Administração e Participações Ltda.; (TV Rio Sul Ltda.)

History
- First air date: December 1, 1990
- Former channel numbers: Analog: 13 (VHF, 1990-2018)

Technical information
- Licensing authority: ANATEL
- ERP: 2 kW
- Transmitter coordinates: 22°28′32.5″S 44°27′17.5″W

Links
- Public license information: Profile
- Website: redeglobo.globo.com/rj/tvriosul

TV Rio Sul (channel 13) is a TV Globo-affiliated television station based in Resende, a city in the state of Rio de Janeiro. The station covers the southern and central-south regions of Rio de Janeiro (with the exception of the municipality of Areal which, since 1997, has received the signal from InterTV Serra+Mar).

== History ==
TV Rio Sul started broadcasting on December 1, 1990, operating from the fourth floor of a commercial building. The facilities were provisional; in 1997, construction work for dedicated facilities started, TV Rio Sul vacated its provisional facilities on March 19, 1999. In 1993, the station held its first futsal tournament.

In 1995, the station opened an office in Volta Redonda, gaining a local team; up until then, the staff had to move from Resende to cover local events. The weekly program Rio Sul Revista (renamed Revista in 2017) premiered in 1997. TV Rio Sul opened a new regional unit in Angra dos Reis in 2000. In 2001, its website Rio Sul Net opened, being shut down in April 2013 due to the realignment of Globo's affiliate websites. In 2009, a fourth unit, geographically distant from the Resende offices and the adjacent regional units, opened in Três Rios.

== Technical information ==
=== Subchannels ===
Channel	Video	Aspect	Short name	Programming
13.1	1080i	16:9	TV Rio Sul	Main TV Rio Sul programming / TV Globo

TV Rio Sul began its digitization process on March 14, 2010, when the master control and technical center rooms were upgraded. The digital signal started in 2012. In June 2018, all of its coverage area had received digital signals; its analog signal shut down on December 12, 2018, according to the official ANATEL roadmap.
