= Resende Airport =

Resende Airport Aeroporto de Resende
- IATA: REZ; ICAO: SDRS; LID: RJ0007

Summary
- Airport type: Public
- Operator: Resende
- Serves: Resende
- Time zone: BRT (UTC−03:00)
- Elevation AMSL: 402 m (1,319 ft)
- Coordinates: 22°28′43″S 044°28′54″W

Map
- Location in Brazil REZ (Brazil)

Runways
| Direction | Length | | Surface |
| Direction | m | ft | Surface |
|---|---|---|---|
| 08/26 | 1,300 | 4,265 | Asphalt |
- Sources: ANAC, DECEA

Resende Airport (IATA: REZ, ICAO: SDRS) is the airport serving Resende, Brazil.

It is operated by the Municipality of Resende.

== History ==
The airport was opened in 1941.

== Access ==
The airport is located 5 km (3 mi) from downtown Resende.

== See also ==
- List of airports in Brazil
