= Ronildo =

Brazilian footballer

Personal information
- Full name: Ronildo Batista dos Santos
- Date of birth: 6 May 1976 (age 50)
- Place of birth: Pimenta Bueno, Brazil
- Height: 1.74 m (5 ft 9 in)
- Position: Left back

Senior career*
Years	Team	Apps	(Gls)
1994–1998	Goiás		
1998	→ Portuguesa (loan)		
1999	Botafogo		
1999–2002	Atlético Mineiro	162	(2)
2003	Ponte Preta		
2004	Juventude		
2004	Atlético Paranaense		
2005	Portuguesa		
2005	Gama		
2006	Ipatinga		
2006–2007	Atlético Goianiense		
2007	CRAC		
2008	ABC		
2008	Goiânia		
2009	CRAC		
2009	Goiânia		
2010	CRAC		
- * Club domestic league appearances and goals as of 7 May 2024

Ronildo Batista dos Santos (born 6 May 1976), simply known as Ronildo, is a Brazilian former professional footballer who played as a left back.

== Career ==
Born in Pimenta Bueno, Rondônia, Ronildo began his football career with Goiás, where he was state champion. He later played for Portuguesa and Botafogo, until arriving at Atlético Mineiro, where he was twice state champion and one of the highlights of the national runner-up campaign in 1999. He played for other teams, most notably Athletico Paranaense and Atlético Goianiense.

== Honours ==
Goiás

- Campeonato Goiano: 1996, 1997, 1998

Atlético Mineiro

- Campeonato Mineiro: 1999, 2000

Atlético Goianiense

- Campeonato Goiano: 2007
