= Oldair =

Brazilian footballer (1939–2014)

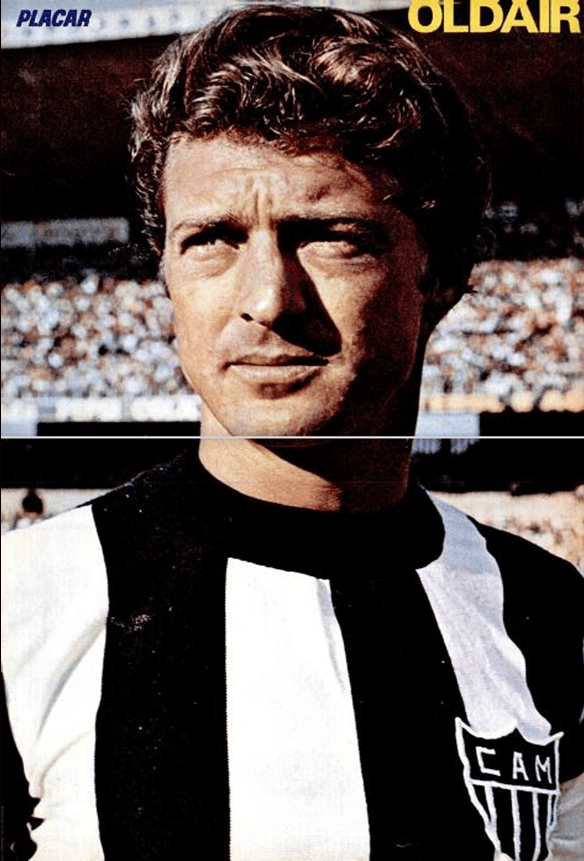
- Oldair in 1971

Personal information
- Full name: Oldair Barchi
- Date of birth: 1 July 1939
- Place of birth: Araraquara, São Paulo, Brazil
- Date of death: 31 October 2014 (aged 75)
- Place of death: Belo Horizonte, Minas Gerais, Brazil
- Height: 1.73 m (5 ft 8 in)
- Positions: Midfielder; left-back

Youth career
- –1960: Palmeiras

Senior career*
Years	Team	Apps	(Gls)
1958–1960	Palmeiras		
1960–1965	Fluminense		
1965–1967	Vasco da Gama	138	(15)
1968–1973	Atlético Mineiro	281	(62)
1973	CEUB		
1974–1977	ESAB		

International career
1966–1968	Brazil	3	(0)
- * Club domestic league appearances and goals

Oldair Barchi (1 July 1939 – 31 October 2014) was a Brazilian footballer. Nicknamed "Capitão", he played as a midfielder and a left-back for Palmeiras, Vasco da Gama and Atlético Mineiro throughout the 1960s and the early 1970s. He also played for Brazil on three occasions throughout the 1960s.

== Club career ==
He began his career with Palmeiras following a series of tryouts when he was 16 where he would be a part of the winning squad for the 1959 Campeonato Paulista despite being only a reserve without many opportunities to play. Around this time, he originally played as midfielder, sometimes playing as a left-back. Despite winning the Torneio Rio–São Paulo in 1960, he never found a time to shine in the spotlight and was considering playing for another club within the São Paulo area. He would then be transferred to play for Fluminense based in Rio de Janeiro following invitation of club manager Zezé Moreira as well as a salary of 600 thousand cruzeiros. Throughout his five years with the club, he would alternate with Edmílson and Íris as a midfielder until firmly establishing himself within the starting XI. His career with the club would end during the middle of the 1965 Campeonato Brasileiro Série A due to contractual disagreements as the management at Fluminense wouldn't accept to Oldair's new demanding salary price of 60 million cruzeiros.

The same club manager, Zezé Moreira, would later convince Oldair to play for Vasco da Gama for the remainder of the season for only 40 million. He would man-mark Garrincha in the final of the inaugural Taça Guanabara in 1965 and scored the first goal in Vasco's 2–0 victory against Botafogo with an audience of 115 thousand fans at Maracanã with the club receiving their first title in the tournament. This would result in the club's qualification for the 1965 Campeonato Brasileiro Série A, where Vasco would be runner-up in the tournament, also winning the 1966 Torneio Rio–São Paulo. By the time of the end of his tenure with the club, he would play in 138 matches with 15 goals.

In 1968, in an exchange involving midfielder Buglê, Oldair would be transferred to play for Atlético Mineiro. However, he would face difficulties during the late 1960s as he would enter into disagreements with the new club manager Yustrich as he would soon be benched and removed from the starting XI. Despite this, Oldair continued to train, believing that he would soon enough have his old position restored. This would come in the 1970 Campeonato Brasileiro Série A as he was selected to become captain by new manager Telê Santana, winning that year's Campeonato Mineiro. This success would continue into the 1971 Campeonato Brasileiro Série A with the club earning their first national title. He would also score the historic winning goal by 1-0 through a free kick against São Paulo in the final phase of the tournament, ensuring that the "rooster" played for a draw in the final match against Botafogo at Maracanã.

Following two more seasons with the club, he would make 282 appearances and would score 61 goals. Oldair would then play for CEUB in 1973 before returning to Minas Gerais to play for ESAB until his retirement in 1977.

== International career ==
Oldair would play for Brazil on three occasions with his debut being in a friendly against Rio Grande do Sul on 1 May 1965 that ended in a 2–0 victory. He would then play in a friendly against Peru on 8 June 1965 which would end 3–1. He would also be in the 47-man provisional Brazilian roster for the 1966 FIFA World Cup but would ultimately not make the final roster. His final international match would be on 11 August 1968 in a 3–2 victory against Argentina. Conversely, he would play in a 1–2 against Brazil whilst representing Atlético Mineiro on 3 September 1969.

== Personal life ==
Following his retirement, he would then pursue the sales of construction materials as he and his wife Vanda worked in business, later working within private clothing companies. He would later have a granddaughter, Larissa. He died from lung cancer on 31 October 2014 following hospitalization at the Hospital Luxemburgo following a smoking additction he had developed.
