= Guará (footballer, born 1946) =

Brazilian footballer (1946–2008)

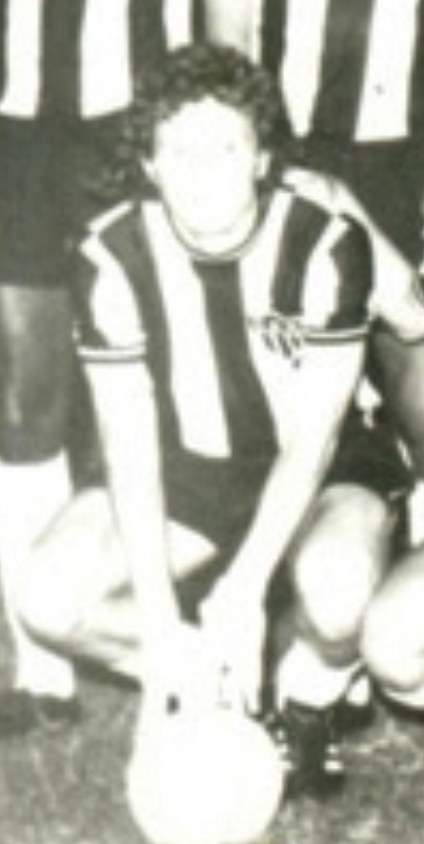
- Guará in 1972

Personal information
- Full name: Paulo Roberto Durães de Castilho
- Date of birth: 24 March 1946
- Place of birth: Belo Horizonte, Minas Gerais, Brazil
- Date of death: 12 February 2008 (aged 61)
- Place of death: Sete Lagoas, Minas Gerais, Brazil
- Position: Forward

Senior career*
Years	Team	Apps	(Gls)
1966–1967	Democrata–SL		
1971–1972	Atlético Mineiro	53	(6)
1971	→ Tupi (loan)		
1972	São Paulo		
1973–1975	América Mineiro		
1974	→ Operário–MS (loan)		
1975	Desportiva Ferroviária		
1976	São José		
- * Club domestic league appearances and goals

Paulo Roberto Durães de Castilho (24 March 1946 – 12 February 2008), more commonly known as Guará was a Brazilian footballer. He was most well known for playing for Atlético Mineiro throughout the early 1970s, playing as a forward throughout his career.

== Career ==
He would sign with Atlético Mineiro beginning in the 1971 season where he would soon be loaned out to Tupi. However, he would play for long enough that he would be a part of the winning squads for the 1971 Campeonato Brasileiro Série A and the 1972 Campeonato Mineiro. By the end of his short-lived career with the club, he would make 53 appearances and score 6 goals for the club. Following several brief spells with several other clubs, he would end his career with São José in 1976.

== Personal life ==
Guará died on 12 February 2008 at Sete Logas with his funeral taking place at the Capela do Asilo de São Vicente de Paulo. His son, Paulinho Guará, would survive him and continue his father's legacy as he would later also play for Atlético Mineiro as well as go abroad to play in Swedish football.
