= Mussula =

Brazilian footballer (1938–2018)

Personal information
- Full name: Luiz de Matos Luchesi
- Date of birth: 14 August 1938
- Place of birth: Belo Horizonte, Brazil
- Date of death: 20 November 2018 (aged 80)
- Place of death: Belo Horizonte, Brazil
- Position: Goalkeeper

Senior career*
Years	Team	Apps	(Gls)
1955–1957	Cruzeiro		
1958	Atlético Mineiro		
1958–1961	Villa Nova		
1961–1963	Cruzeiro		
1964–1965	Renascença		
1966	Villa Nova		
1966	América Mineiro		
1967–1974	Atlético Mineiro	168	(0)

International career
1968	Brazil	1	(0)

Managerial career
- 1975–1976: Atlético Mineiro
- 1978: Atlético Mineiro
- 1981–1982: Villa Nova
- 1983: Atlético Mineiro
- 1984: Villa Nova
- 1985: Uberlândia
- 1987: Democrata-SL
- 1993: Atlético Mineiro
- * Club domestic league appearances and goals

Luiz de Matos Luchesi (14 August 1938 – 20 November 2018), better known as Mussula, was a Brazilian professional footballer and manager, who played as a goalkeeper.

== Career ==
Born in Belo Horizonte, Mussula spent his career in the city's clubs, playing for Cruzeiro, Villa Nova from the neighboring city of Nova Lima, EC Renascensa and Atlético Mineiro. As a coach, he managed Atlético Mineiro on some occasions, becoming state champion in 1983.

Mussula also made 1 appearances for the Brazil national team, in a friendly match in 1968.

== Death ==
Mussula died on 20 November 2018 at the age of 80 in Belo Horizonte.

== Honours ==
=== Player ===
Cruzeiro

- Campeonato Mineiro: 1961

Atlético Mineiro

- Campeonato Brasileiro: 1971
- Campeonato Mineiro: 1970

=== Manager ===
Atlético Mineiro

- Campeonato Mineiro: 1983
