= Marcelino (footballer) =

Brazilian footballer (1939–2002)

Personal information
- Full name: Marcelino Paz do Nascimento
- Date of birth: 28 January 1939
- Place of birth: Carinhanha, Brazil
- Date of death: 18 March 2002 (aged 63)
- Place of death: Montes Claros, Brazil
- Position: Defender

Youth career
- Cassimiro de Abreu-MG

Senior career*
Years	Team	Apps	(Gls)
1960–1966	Atlético Mineiro	239	(1)
- * Club domestic league appearances and goals as of 29 May 2024

Marcelino Paz do Nascimento (28 January 1939 – 18 March 2002), simply known as Marcelino, was a Brazilian professional footballer who played as a defender.

== Career ==
A player with great physical ability, Marcelino began his career at Cassimiro de Abreu, from Montes Claros. He played for Atlético Mineiro from 1960 to 1966, being state champion twice and playing 239 matches for the club.

== Honours ==
Atlético Mineiro

- Campeonato Mineiro: 1962, 1963

== Death ==
Marcelino died of prostate cancer, aged 63, on 18 March 2002 in the city of Montes Claros.
