= Fábio (footballer, born 1979) =

Brazilian footballer

Personal information
- Full name: Fábio Penchel de Siqueira
- Date of birth: 1 January 1979 (age 47)
- Place of birth: Resende, RJ, Brazil
- Height: 1.78 m (5 ft 10 in)
- Position: Striker

Senior career*
Years	Team	Apps	(Gls)
2002	Volta Redonda	20	(16)
2002–2004	Botafogo RJ	30	(17)
2005	Portuguesa		
2005	Volta Redonda	16	(2)
2006	Paraná Clube	4	(1)
2007	Volta Redonda	20	(11)
2007–2008	Al Hazm		
2008	Volta Redonda		
2008	Cabofriense		
2008–2009	Santo André		
2010	Madureira	7	(2)
2010	Cabofriense		
2011	Resende	4	(0)
2012	Volta Redonda	2	(0)
2013	Tupi	2	(0)
2014	Duque de Caxias		
- * Club domestic league appearances and goals

Fábio Penchel de Siqueira or simply Fábio (born 1 January 1979) is a Brazilian former football striker.

== Career ==
Born in Resende, Rio de Janeiro, Fábio has played professional football for several clubs in Brazil. He has had several spells with Volta Redonda Futebol Clube, where he would lead the Campeonato Carioca in goal-scoring with 16 goals during the 2002 season and win the 2005 Taça Guanabara. With 49 goals, he is the second all-time leading scorer for Volta Redonda. At age 27, he had a brief spell abroad with Saudi side Al Hazm.
