= Renato (footballer, born 1944) =

Brazilian footballer

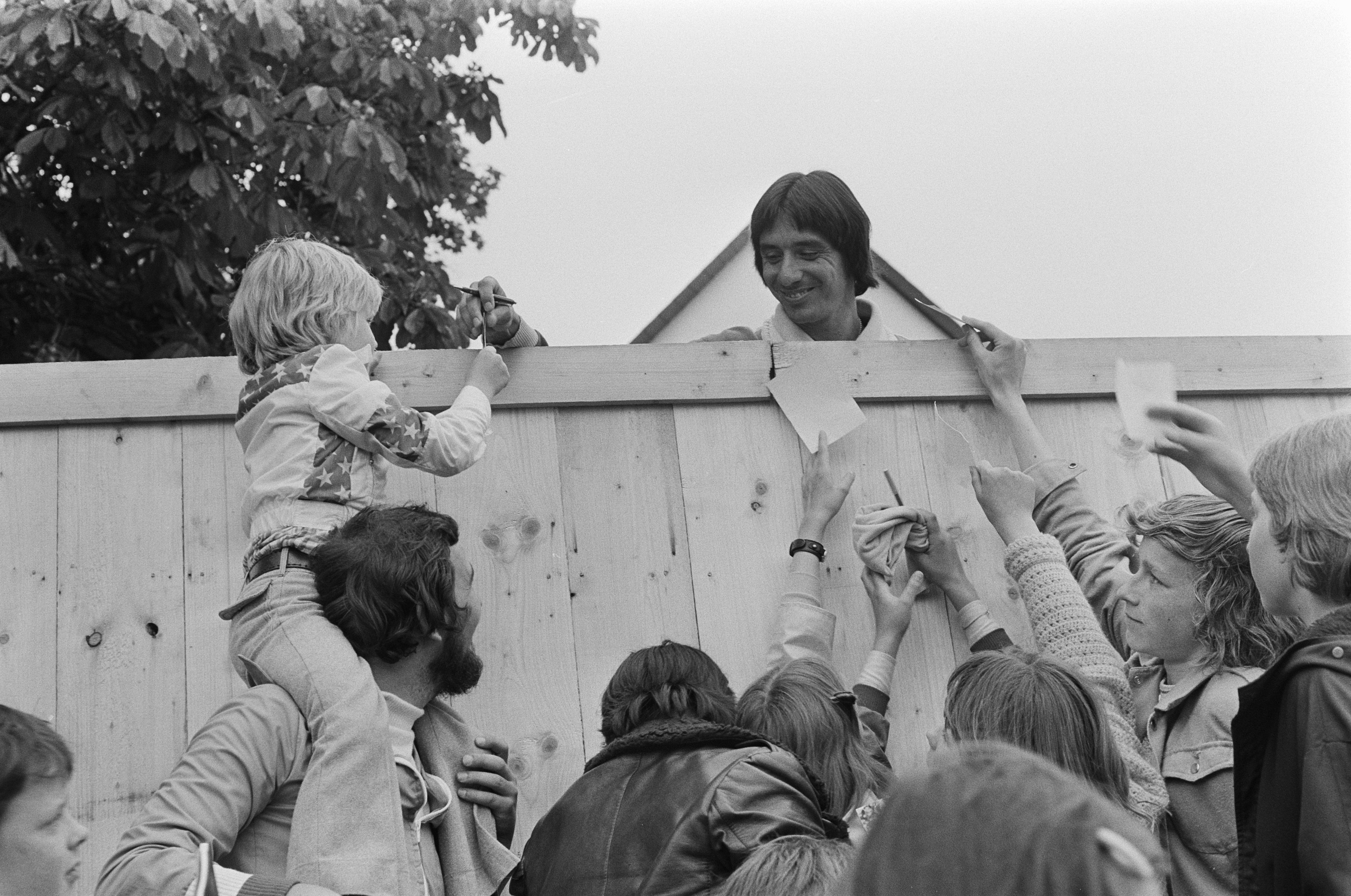
- Renato hands out signature (1974)

Personal information
- Full name: Renato Cunha Valle
- Date of birth: December 5, 1944 (age 81)
- Place of birth: Rio de Janeiro, Brazil
- Height: 1.80 m (5 ft 11 in)

Senior career*
Years	Team	Apps	(Gls)
1964	Flamengo	1	(0)
1965	Taubaté		
1966	Entrerriense		
1967–1968	Flamengo	4	(0)
1969	Uberlândia		
1970–1972	Clube Atlético Mineiro	64	(0)
1972–1975	Flamengo	70	(0)
1976–1979	Fluminense	37	(0)
1979–1982	Bahia	33	(0)
1982–1983	Al Ahli		

International career
1973–1974	Brazil	2	(0)
- * Club domestic league appearances and goals

Renato Cunha Valle (born December 5, 1944, in Rio de Janeiro), better known as Renato, is a former footballer who played as a goalkeeper.

He played for Flamengo (1964, 1967–68 and 1972–75), Taubaté (1965), Entrerriense (1966), Uberlândia (1969), Clube Atlético Mineiro (1970–1972), Fluminense (1976–1979), Bahia (1979–1982) and Al Ahli (Dubai) (1982–1983).

Renato won a Brazilian championship title in 1971 whilst with Atletico Mineiro.

He made a total of two appearances for the Brazil national football team (both in 1973), and he also made the Brazilian squad for the 1974 FIFA World Cup.

== Honours ==
Atlético Mineiro

- Campeonato Mineiro: 1970

Flamengo

- Campeonato Carioca: 1972, 1974

Fluminense

- Campeonato Carioca: 1975, 1976

Bahia

- Campeonato Baiano: 1979, 1981, 1982
