= Guará =

- Municipality
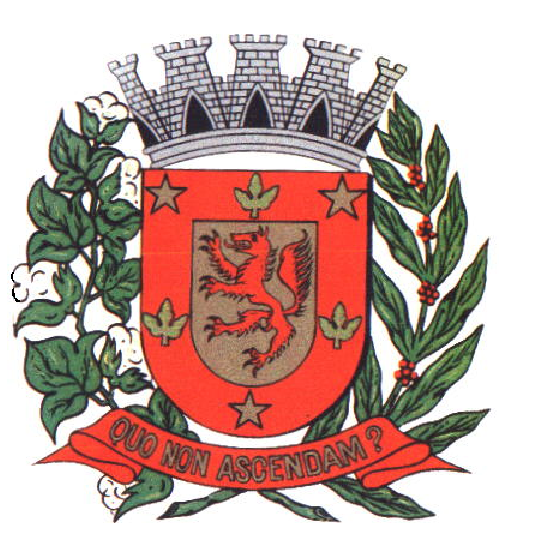
- Flag Coat of arms

- Location in São Paulo state

- Location in Brazil
- Coordinates: 20°25′42″S 47°49′27″W
- Country: Brazil
- Region: Southeast
- State: São Paulo

Area
  - Total: 362 km^{2} (140 sq mi)

Population (2020)
  - Total: 21,308
  - Density: 58.9/km^{2} (152/sq mi)
- Time zone: UTC−3 (BRT)

Guará is a municipality situated in the northern part of the state of São Paulo in Brazil. The population is 21,308 (2020 est.) in an area of 362 km^{2}. The elevation is 573 m.

This place name comes from the Tupi language for two animals common in the region, the maned wolf (Chrysocyon brachyurus) and the scarlet ibis (Eudocimus ruber).

== See also ==
- List of municipalities in São Paulo
