= Pintinho =

Brazilian footballer

Personal information
- Full name: Carlos Alberto Gomes Montero
- Date of birth: 25 June 1954 (age 72)
- Place of birth: Rio de Janeiro, Brazil
- Height: 1.77 m (5 ft 9 1/2 in)
- Positions: Midfielder; defender

Senior career*
Years	Team	Apps	(Gls)
1972–1980	Fluminense	264	(4)
1980	Vasco da Gama	13	(0)
1980–1984	Sevilla	86	(23)
1984–1985	Fluminense	3	(0)
1985–1986	Cádiz	11	(0)
1986	Farense		

International career
1977–1979	Brazil	3	(0)
- * Club domestic league appearances and goals

Carlos Alberto Gomes Montero (born 25 June 1954) known as Pintinho, is a Brazilian former footballer who played as a midfielder.
