= Renato Queiróz =

Brazilian footballer

Renato
Personal information
- Full name: Renato Queiróz
- Date of birth: 30 March 1958
- Place of birth: Santos Dumont, Brazil
- Date of death: 4 May 1993 (aged 35)
- Place of death: Belo Horizonte, Brazil
- Height: 1.72 m (5 ft 8 in)
- Position: Attacking midfielder

Youth career
- –1977: Atlético Mineiro

Senior career*
Years	Team	Apps	(Gls)
1977–1986	Atlético Mineiro	213	(29)
1984–1985	→ Grêmio (loan)	15	(2)
1986	Santo André		
- * Club domestic league appearances and goals as of 29 May 2024

Renato Queiróz (30 March 1958 – 4 May 1993) was a Brazilian professional footballer who played as an attacking midfielder.

== Career ==
Revealed in the youth sectors of Atlético Mineiro, Renato was two-time champion of the Copa São Paulo de Futebol Jr. For Atlético's main team, he played 213 matches, scoring 29 goals, taking part in winning five state titles. He also had spells at Grêmio and Santo André, where he ended his career in 1986. He died after a massive heart attack, at the age of 35.

== Honours ==
Atlético Mineiro

- Campeonato Mineiro: 1980, 1981, 1982, 1983, 1986
- Copa dos Campeões da Copa Brasil: 1978
- Taça Minas Gerais: 1979, 1986
- Trofeo Costa del Sol: 1980
- Berna Philips Cup: 1983
- Copa São Paulo de Futebol Júnior: 1975, 1976
