= Jorge Valença =

Brazilian footballer

Personal information
- Full name: Jorge Queiroz Souza
- Date of birth: 19 April 1953 (age 73)
- Place of birth: Valença, Brazil
- Height: 1.72 m (5 ft 8 in)
- Position: Left back

Senior career*
Years	Team	Apps	(Gls)
1972–1976	Vitória		
1977–1978	America-RJ		
1979–1986	Atlético Mineiro		
1986–1987	América-MG		
1987	Atlético Mineiro		
1988	Villa Nova		
1989	Atlético Paranaense		
1989	Galícia		
1990	Villa Nova		

Managerial career
- 2004–2008: Atlético Mineiro (assistant)
- * Club domestic league appearances and goals as of 28 May 2024

Jorge Queiroz Souza (born 19 April 1953), better known as Jorge Valença, is a Brazilian former professional footballer who played as a left back.

== Career ==
Left back, Jorge Valença is in the Atlético Mineiro hall of fame, where he played 333 matches, scored 13 goals and won the state championship six times. He also played for Vitória, América Mineiro, Villa Nova, Athletico Paranaense and Galícia, and after retiring, he became an assistant coach in youth categories. He was an assistant at Atlético Mineiro from 2004 to 2008, and currently works in a store that operates in the food sector.

== Honours ==
Atlético Mineiro

- Campeonato Mineiro: 1980, 1981, 1982, 1983, 1985, 1986
- Trofeo Costa del Sol: 1980
- Berna Philips Cup: 1983
