= Guaro (Larense) =

Guaro is an informal descriptive term, or colloquial demonym, for people from Lara State, in Venezuela. It is also used by inhabitants of Lara, Yaracuy, Portuguesa, and Trujillo to refer to people (i.e. "ese guaro") much like "bloke" or "dude" is used in UK and US English. Also, in those regions, Guaro is an adjective used to describe someone who talks (or says) too much; being called guaro is regarded locally as a mark of an extroverted and talkative character. Guaroloco (crazy guaro) is traditionally said of mischievous or extroverted people. It's relatively easy to recognize the people from this region of Venezuela because of their extensive use of the word guaro and its derivatives.
