= Resende, Rio de Janeiro =

Resende
- Municipality
- Municipality of Resende
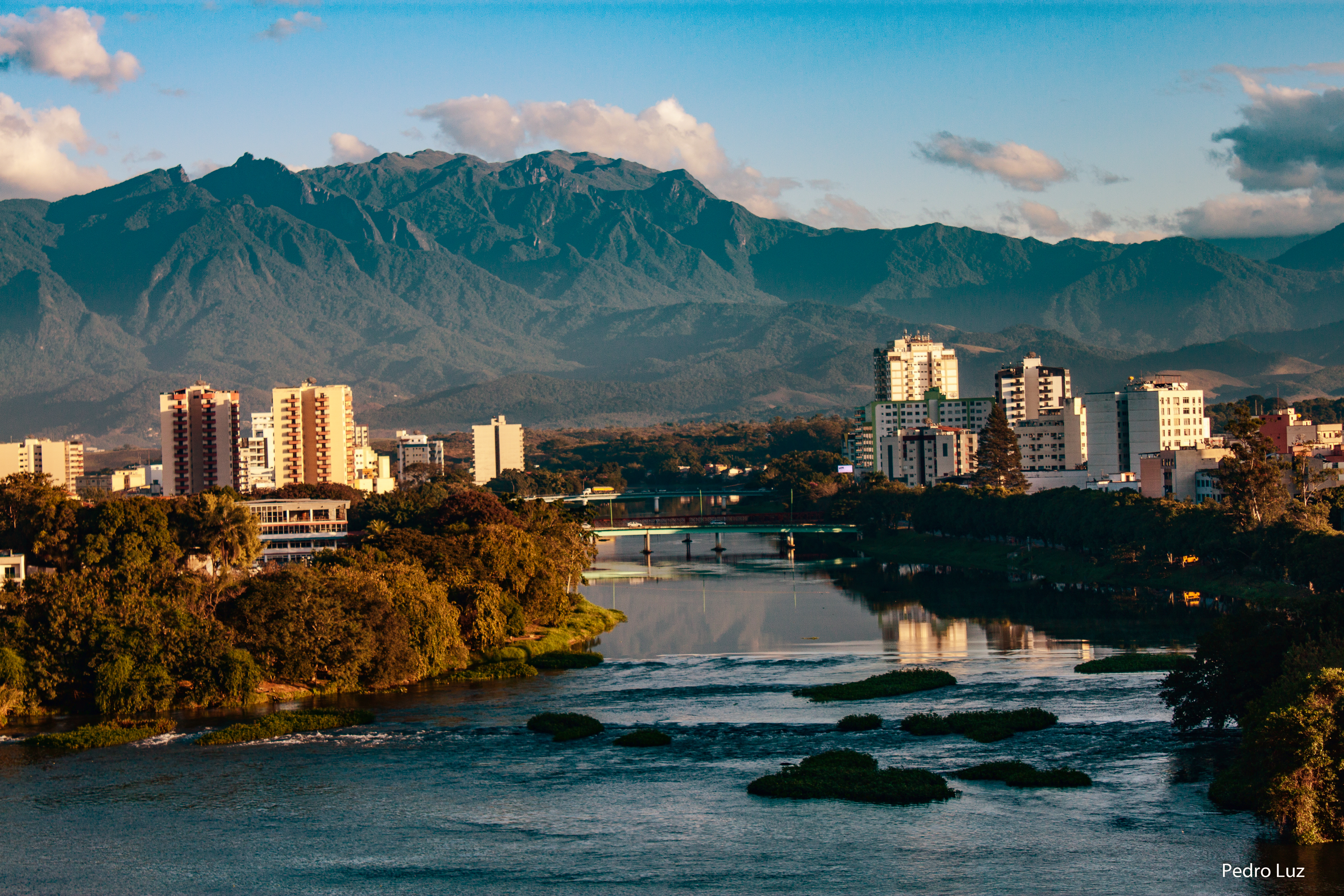

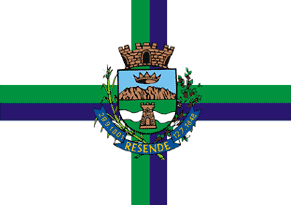
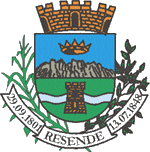
- Flag Coat of arms
- Nicknames: Entrepreneurship Capital; Valley's Princess
- Location in Rio de Janeiro

- Location in Brazil
- Coordinates: 22°28′08″S 44°26′49″W
- Country: Brazil
- Region: Southeast
- State: Rio de Janeiro

Government
  - Mayor: Diogo Balieiro Diniz (PSD)

Area
  - Total: 1,099.336 km^{2} (424.456 sq mi)
- Elevation: 407 m (1,335 ft)

Population (2022 Census)
  - Total: 129,612
  - Estimate (2025): 137,697
  - Density: 117.900/km^{2} (305.360/sq mi)
- Time zone: UTC−3 (BRT)
- HDI (2010): 0.768 – high
- Website: resende.rj.gov.br

Resende (Brazilian Portuguese pronunciation: [ʁeˈzẽdʒi]) is a municipality located in the Brazilian state of Rio de Janeiro. The population is 132,312 (2020 est.) in an area of 1094 km^{2}. Resendense refers to people or things that come from or inhabit Resende. It is the oldest town in this region, which has boundaries with the state of São Paulo and Minas Gerais. It is an important industrial, automotive, metallurgical, and tourist center, and headquarters of the world's second-largest military complex, the Academia Militar das Agulhas Negras (AMAN). Resende is of national importance and houses the Nuclear Fuel Factory complex of the "Indústrias Nucleares" of Brasil (Brazilian Nuclear Factories), the only one able to enrich uranium. Resende's automotive area holds MAN Latin America (former Volkswagen Trucks and Buses), the biggest truck and bus factory of Brazil, limited to PSA Peugeot Citroën and Michelin.

The town has the following tourist attractions: Visconde de Mauá, Parque Nacional do Itatiaia, Engenheiro Passos, AMAN, Serrinha do Alambari, Penedo (which belong the city of Itatiaia), the Cachoeira da Fumaça, and some of the city's houses. Resende is home to the largest theater in Latin America, The Academy Theater with a capacity of 2,884 people. Resende is crossed by Rodovia Presidente Dutra, the most important Brazilian road, also called Rio - São Paulo. The municipality has a big territorial extension, 1.144 km^{2}, as mentioned before, the biggest in the area between Rio and São Paulo, between the municipalities traversed by the road which connects them. Resende is served by Resende Airport.

== History ==
Resende, 1951. National Archives of Brazil.

The town was founded in the middle of the 18th century and was called Nossa Senhora da Conceição do Campo Alegre da Paraíba Nova (Our Lady of the Joyful Field of New Paraíba) at first. The first inhabitants, the Puris Indians, called it Timburibá. On September 29, 1801, it was renamed Resende, after the act of 13th Viceroy of Brazil and 2nd Count of Resende, General José Luís de Castro. The Academia Militar de Agulhas Negras military academy (AMAN) (Black Needles Military Academy, named after the local rock formation) is located in Resende. The development was fast due to the proximity of two metropolises, and to Minas Gerais state.

== Economy ==
Resende's main economy is coffee and milk in the agricultural sector, uranium refining, vehicle manufacturing, which includes Volkswagen Truck & Bus and Nissan do Brasil factories. Resende contains the headquarters of TV Rio Sul, an affiliate of Globo Network Television and a lot of stores that are represented by CDL Resende-Itatiaia.

== Tourism ==
Its geography includes Mantiqueira Mountains, the Pico das Agulhas Negras and the Paraíba do Sul. Tourist attractions near Resende include Visconde de Mauá and Penedo, two small villages with restaurants, inns and cottages, and the first Brazilian National Park, called Parque Nacional do Itatiaia (PNI).

The municipality contains the 6.7-hectare (17-acre) Rio Pombo Nature Park, established in 1988. It also contains the 5,760-hectare (14,200-acre) Serrinha do Alambari Environmental Protection Area, created in 1991. The municipality contain part of the 8,036-hectare (19,860-acre) Pedra Selada State Park, created in 2012.

== Sport ==
The football club Resende Futebol Clube won the 2007 Campeonato Carioca Second Level, and competed in the 2008 and 2009 Campeonato Carioca seasons. The club plays its home matches at Estádio Municipal do Trabalhador, which has a maximum capacity of 10,000 people.

== Notable people ==
- Tande, volleyball player
- Adriana Samuel, beach volleyball player
- Maria Elisa Antonelli, beach volleyball player
- Matheus Gonche, swimmer
- Carlos Bolsonaro, politician
- Flávio Bolsonaro, politician
- Bia Kicis, politician
- Fábio Penchel de Siqueira, footballer

== Climate ==
Climate data for Resende (1981–2010)
Month	Jan	Feb	Mar	Apr	May	Jun	Jul	Aug	Sep	Oct	Nov	Dec	Year
Mean daily maximum °C (°F)	30.1 (86.2)	30.8 (87.4)	29.6 (85.3)	27.9 (82.2)	25.5 (77.9)	24.7 (76.5)	24.5 (76.1)	25.9 (78.6)	26.5 (79.7)	27.9 (82.2)	28.9 (84.0)	29.6 (85.3)	27.7 (81.9)
Daily mean °C (°F)	24.2 (75.6)	24.5 (76.1)	23.9 (75.0)	22.4 (72.3)	19.7 (67.5)	17.9 (64.2)	17.8 (64.0)	18.9 (66.0)	20.2 (68.4)	21.9 (71.4)	23.1 (73.6)	23.9 (75.0)	21.5 (70.7)
Mean daily minimum °C (°F)	20.4 (68.7)	20.3 (68.5)	19.9 (67.8)	18.5 (65.3)	15.6 (60.1)	12.9 (55.2)	12.4 (54.3)	13.3 (55.9)	15.4 (59.7)	17.5 (63.5)	18.8 (65.8)	20.0 (68.0)	17.1 (62.8)
Average precipitation mm (inches)	292.9 (11.53)	216.9 (8.54)	232.5 (9.15)	85.9 (3.38)	47.6 (1.87)	22.9 (0.90)	28.7 (1.13)	20.9 (0.82)	70.7 (2.78)	125.4 (4.94)	213.0 (8.39)	260.8 (10.27)	1,618.2 (63.71)
Average precipitation days (≥ 1.0 mm)	18	15	15	8	6	4	4	3	8	11	15	18	125
Average relative humidity (%)	78.0	76.7	78.3	77.4	77.6	77.2	75.0	69.9	71.7	73.9	76.0	78.2	75.8
Mean monthly sunshine hours	143.8	157.8	149.9	159.3	163.4	169.0	174.9	182.4	125.2	129.4	131.0	130.6	1,816.7
Source: Instituto Nacional de Meteorologia
