= Entrerriense Futebol Clube =

Brazilian football club

Entrerriense
- Full name: Entrerriense Futebol Clube
- Nickname(s): Galo
- Founded: December 14, 1925
- Ground: Estádio Odair Gama, Três Rios, Rio de Janeiro State, Brazil
- Capacity: 10,000
Home colours	Away colours

Entrerriense Futebol Clube is a Brazilian football team from Três Rios, Rio de Janeiro State.

== History ==
They were founded on 12 December 1925.

The club has played at the top level of the Campeonato Carioca tournament. In the 1993 tournament they were relegated alongside their city rivals America, but the following season they won the 2nd level championship (Intermediate Division). Playing back at the Rio top level in 1995 they survived relegation on the field, but did not appear in the 1996 tournament.

Entrerriense returned to the Rio top level for 2002 following their success in both the 2001 2nd level tournament and the subsequent promotion qualifying event. However, they had a difficult season in the 2002 top level and were relegated.

After their last relegation, Entrerriense managed to play Campeonato Carioca Série A2 for three years before withdrawing from professional football in 2007.

== Stadium ==
They play at the Odair Gama stadium which has a capacity of 10,000.

== Honours ==
- Campeonato Carioca Série A2
  - Winners (2): 1994, 2001
