= Dadá Maravilha =

Brazilian footballer (born 1946)

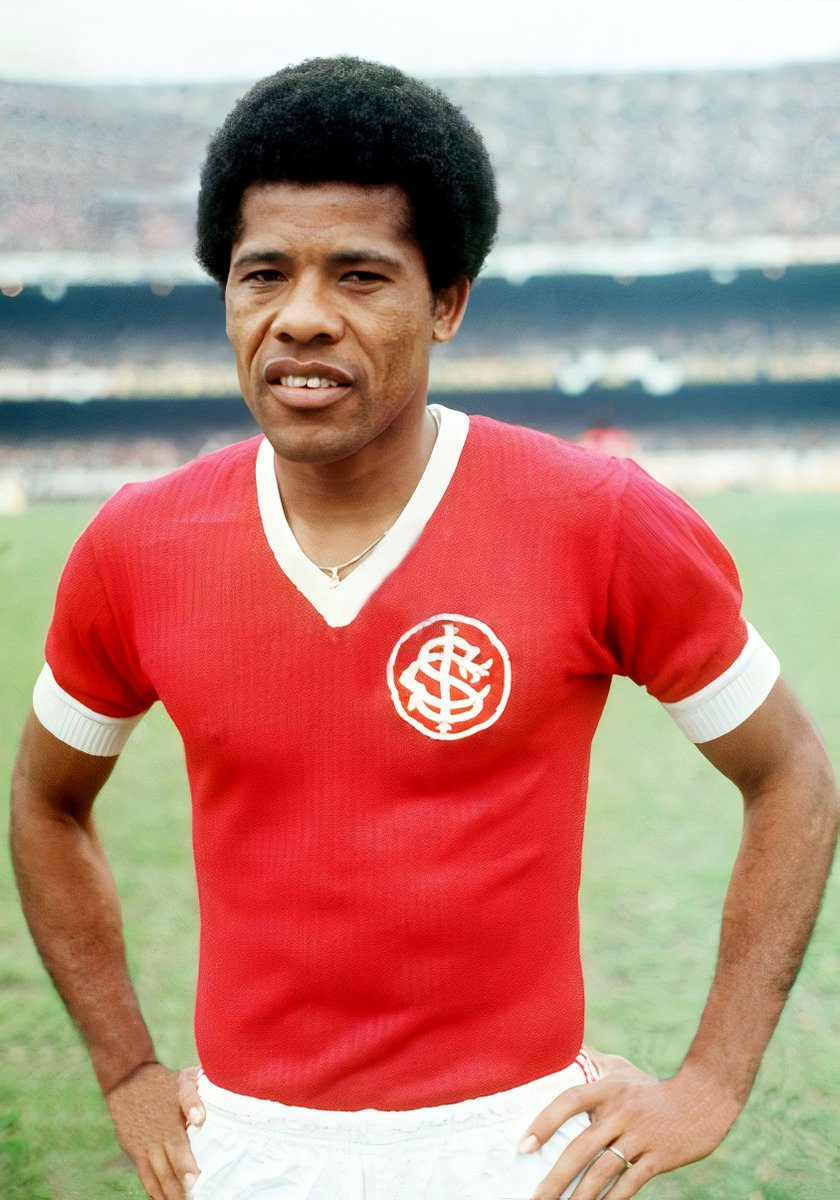
- Dario in the 1975–76 season

Personal information
- Full name: Dario Jose dos Santos
- Date of birth: 4 March 1946 (age 80)
- Place of birth: Rio de Janeiro, Brazil
- Position: Forward

Senior career*
Years	Team	Apps	(Gls)
1967–1968	Campo Grande-RJ	28	(9)
1968–1972	Atlético Mineiro	182	(123)
1973–1974	Flamengo	45	(22)
1974	Atlético Mineiro	24	(23)
1974–1975	Sport	73	(74)
1976–1977	Internacional	30	(27)
1977–1978	Ponte Preta	38	(22)
1978	Atlético Mineiro	14	(9)
1979	Paysandu	16	(17)
1980	Náutico	33	(22)
1981	Santa Cruz	13	(7)
1981–1982	Bahia	68	(35)
1983	Goiás	24	(9)
1983–1984	Coritiba	19	(5)
1984	Atlético Mineiro	5	(3)
1985	Nacional-AM	28	(19)
1985	XV de Piracicaba	3	(3)
1986	Comercial (Registro)		
Total		657	(429)

International career
1970–1973	Brazil	7	(0)
Medal record
Men's Football
Representing Brazil
FIFA World Cup
Winner	1970 Mexico
- * Club domestic league appearances and goals

Dario José dos Santos (born 4 March 1946), nicknamed Dario or Dadá Maravilha (Wonder Dadá), is a Brazilian former professional footballer who played as a centre-forward.

== Career ==
Born into poverty, Dadá began his career in 1965, playing in the youth squad of Campo Grande, a small and modest club with no great history in Rio. His style and talent caught the eye of a scout working for Atlético Mineiro, a large and very traditional club from the state of Minas Gerais, who signed him in 1968. In 1969 his prestige was so great that then Brazilian President Emílio Garrastazu Médici asked coach Mário Zagallo to call Dadá to join the national team going to the 1970 World Cup in Mexico. He was benched for most of the tournament, however. In total he was capped 6 times for Brazil between 1970 and 1973.

In 1971, Dadá helped Atlético win its first Campeonato Brasileiro title, scoring the only goal in the final match against Botafogo. He played for Atlético until 1973, when he transferred over to Flamengo. After another brief stint with Atlético, he played for Sport Club do Recife in the 1974–75 season, where he helped the team win the Pernambuco state championship. In April 1976 he scored 10 goals in a game against Santo Amaro (14–0), a record for the Brazilian football in official matches (previous one held by Pelé).

In 1976, he was signed by Internacional de Porto Alegre for what was, at the time, one of the biggest transactions in Brazilian football. In contrast to great players in the Internacional roster at the time, such as Figueroa, Falcão, Pablo Cesar and Valdomiro, Dadá was perceived as clumsy and slow, but his great positioning and finishing made him one of the greatest strikers in the history of the club. He was the top scorer of the 1976 Brazilian Championship, scoring 16 goals for Internacional, including the first goal in the final match against Corinthians, which Internacional won 2–0.

He signed with Ponte Preta in 1977 but sat out for most of the year while recovering from pneumonia. He returned to Atlético Mineiro for the 1978–1979 season, but wasn't as successful. From 1979 to 1986, he played for several different teams of less prestige like Náutico, Santa Cruz, Bahia and Goiás, finally ending his career at Comercial Esporte Clube, a club from Registro, in São Paulo state.

Throughout his career, his talent for scoring goals and sympathy with the fans earned him many nicknames, including "Dario Peito-de-aço" (Iron Chest Dario), "Rei Dadá" (King Dadá) and "Dadá Beija-Flor" (Dadá the Hummingbird), the latter a reference to his great impulse, which made him seemingly stop in mid-air. Dada's pre-match declarations were much sought after by sport beat reporters as he had the flair of coining names to goals yet to be scored by himself on any given match. He is also notorious for having coined many catch phrases which are still remembered and used by many Brazilian fans, such as "There's no such thing as an ugly goal, what's ugly is not scoring".

== Honours ==
=== Player ===
Atlético Mineiro

- Campeonato Mineiro: 1970, 1978
- Campeonato Brasileiro Série A: 1971

Flamengo

- Campeonato Carioca: 1974

Sport

- Campeonato Pernambucano: 1975

Internacional

- Campeonato Gaúcho: 1976
- Campeonato Brasileiro Série A: 1976

Bahia

- Campeonato Baiano: 1981, 1982

Goiás

- Campeonato Goiano: 1983

Nacional-AM

- Campeonato Amazonense: 1984

Brazil

- FIFA World Cup: 1970

=== Manager ===
Ypiranga Clube

- Campeonato Amapaense: 1994
