= 1971 Campeonato Brasileiro Série A =

Campeonato Brasileiro Série A
- Season: 1971
- Dates: 7 August 1971 – 19 December 1971
- Champions: Atlético Mineiro (2nd title)
- Copa Libertadores: Atlético Mineiro; São Paulo
- Matches: 229
- Goals: 419 (1.83 per match)
- Top goalscorer: Dario (15 goals)
- Average attendance: 20,360

The 1971 Campeonato Brasileiro Série A (officially the Primeiro Campeonato Nacional de Clubes, "First National Championship of Clubs") was the 16th edition of the Brazilian Championship. However, from 1976 until 2010 (when CBF unified the Brazilian titles prior to 1971, considering the 1959 Taça Brasil as the first edition of the championship) this tournament was considered by the highest entity of national football as the first edition of the Campeonato Brasileiro Série A. The competition was won by Atlético Mineiro, thus winning its second Brazilian title.

While the tournament represented the top tier of Brazilian football, its name was "Division Extra", with "First Division" instead used by the second-tier tournament (since known as Campeonato Brasileiro Série B).

== Background ==
During the 1960s, two tournaments were used to pick Brazil's representative at the Copa Libertadores: Taça Brasil (1959-1968), a single-elimination tournament between the state champions; and Torneio Roberto Gomes Pedrosa (1967-1970), divided in two separate group phases with teams mostly from the states of Rio de Janeiro and São Paulo. Both tournaments had a format that barely covered the entire country and had regional phases that diminished fan support, leading to dissatisfaction from both the team owners and the Brazilian Confederation of Sports (CBD), who organized the championship. In 1970, the Brazil national football team won the 1970 FIFA World Cup in Mexico, becoming the first three-time world champion. Seeing the valorization of Brazilian football, president Emílio Médici and the Brazilian media pushed CBD towards a true national tournament. With a format inspired by the European tournaments, the tournament would feature 20 teams. The format of the national tournament was still close to the 1970 Torneio Roberto Gomes Pedrosa, with the state of Ceará being the only addition to the seven featured in the Robertão's final edition. Some of the shunned federation states, led by Goiás, even created their own parallel national tournament, the Torneio Integração da CBD.

== Competition format ==
The season was divided into three phases:

- The First Phase saw the twenty teams divided into two groups of ten. Despite being divided into groups, the phase was contested in a single round-robin format, with each team playing the others once. The top six teams in each group advanced to the Second Phase.
- The Second Phase saw the twelve qualified teams divided into three groups of four. The teams within each group played each other in a double round-robin format. The top team from each group advanced to the Final Phase.
- The Final Phase saw the three team play each other team once. The team with the most points at the end of the round was declared the champion.

== Teams ==
Twenty clubs participated in this championship (home city in parentheses):

- America-RJ (Rio de Janeiro)
- América-MG (Belo Horizonte)
- Atlético Mineiro (Belo Horizonte)
- Bahia (Salvador)
- Botafogo (Rio de Janeiro)
- Ceará (Fortaleza)
- Corinthians (São Paulo)
- Coritiba (Curitiba)
- Cruzeiro (Belo Horizonte)
- Flamengo (Rio de Janeiro)
- Fluminense (Rio de Janeiro)
- Grêmio (Porto Alegre)
- Internacional (Porto Alegre)
- Palmeiras (São Paulo)
- Portuguesa (São Paulo)
- Santa Cruz (Recife)
- Santos (Santos)
- São Paulo (São Paulo)
- Sport (Recife)
- Vasco da Gama (Rio de Janeiro)

== First phase ==
=== Group A standings ===
Pos	Team	Pld	W	D	L	GF	GA	GD	Pts	Qualification
1	Corinthians	19	10	6	3	29	16	+13	26	Advanced to the Second Phase
2	Cruzeiro	19	7	9	3	26	12	+14	23	Advanced to the Second Phase
3	Internacional	19	7	9	3	21	16	+5	23	Advanced to the Second Phase
4	Coritiba	19	10	2	7	21	18	+3	22	Advanced to the Second Phase
5	Palmeiras	19	8	6	5	20	14	+6	22	Advanced to the Second Phase
6	Vasco da Gama	19	6	7	6	11	12	−1	19	Advanced to the Second Phase
7	Santa Cruz	19	3	11	5	17	23	−6	17	
8	Fluminense	19	5	6	8	12	13	−1	16	
9	Portuguesa	19	6	3	10	16	24	−8	15	
10	Ceará	19	2	5	12	5	25	−20	9	

=== Group B standings ===
Pos	Team	Pld	W	D	L	GF	GA	GD	Pts	Qualification
1	Grêmio	19	8	7	4	18	11	+7	23	Advanced to the Second Phase
2	Atlético Mineiro	19	7	9	3	27	16	+11	23	Advanced to the Second Phase
3	America-RJ	19	7	7	5	23	17	+6	21	Advanced to the Second Phase
4	Santos	19	7	7	5	17	11	+6	21	Advanced to the Second Phase
5	Botafogo	19	5	10	4	15	16	−1	20	Advanced to the Second Phase
6	São Paulo	19	6	7	6	16	19	−3	19	Advanced to the Second Phase
7	Bahia	19	5	8	6	14	16	−2	18	
8	Flamengo	19	4	10	5	13	17	−4	18	
9	América-MG	19	2	9	8	11	19	−8	13	
10	Sport Recife	19	4	4	11	10	27	−17	12	

== Second phase ==
=== Group A ===
Pos	Team	Pld	W	D	L	GF	GA	GD	Pts	Qualification
1	São Paulo	6	3	3	0	6	2	+4	9	Advanced to the Final Phase
2	Corinthians	6	2	1	3	4	5	−1	5	
3	America-RJ	6	1	3	2	4	4	0	5	
4	Cruzeiro	6	1	3	2	2	5	−3	5	

=== Group B ===
Pos	Team	Pld	W	D	L	GF	GA	GD	Pts	Qualification
1	Atlético Mineiro	6	3	1	2	10	6	+4	7	Advanced to the Final Phase
2	Internacional	6	3	1	2	7	7	0	7	
3	Santos	6	2	2	2	7	5	+2	6	
4	Vasco da Gama	6	1	2	3	4	10	−6	4	

=== Group C ===
Pos	Team	Pld	W	D	L	GF	GA	GD	Pts	Qualification
1	Botafogo	6	3	2	1	11	6	+5	8	Advanced to the Final Phase
2	Grêmio	6	2	2	2	6	7	−1	6	
3	Palmeiras	6	1	4	1	7	6	+1	6	
4	Coritiba	6	1	2	3	2	7	−5	4	

== Final phase ==
Pos	Team	Pld	W	D	L	GF	GA	GD	Pts
1	Atlético Mineiro	2	2	0	0	2	0	+2	4
2	São Paulo	2	1	0	1	4	2	+2	2
3	Botafogo	2	0	0	2	1	5	−4	0

December 12

Atlético Mineiro	1–0	São Paulo
Oldair 75'

Mineirão, Belo Horizonte
Attendance: 53.903
Referee: Armando Marques

December 15

São Paulo	4–1	Botafogo
Forlán 61'; Terto 65' (86); Toninho 71'		Ney de Oliveira 53'

Morumbi, São Paulo
Attendance: 33.930
Referee: Armando Marques

December 19

Botafogo	0–1	Atlético Mineiro
		Dario 61'

Maracanã, Rio de Janeiro
Attendance: 46.458
Referee: Armando Marques

== Final standings ==
Pos	Team	Pld	W	D	L	GF	GA	GD	Pts	Qualification
1	Atlético Mineiro	27	12	10	5	39	22	+17	34	Finalists
2	São Paulo	27	10	10	7	26	23	+3	30	Finalists
3	Botafogo	27	8	12	7	27	27	0	28	Finalists
4	Corinthians	25	12	7	6	33	21	+12	31	Eliminated in the Second Phase
5	Internacional	25	10	10	5	28	23	+5	30	Eliminated in the Second Phase
6	Grêmio	25	10	9	6	24	18	+6	29	Eliminated in the Second Phase
7	Palmeiras	25	9	10	6	27	20	+7	28	Eliminated in the Second Phase
8	Cruzeiro	25	8	12	5	28	17	+11	28	Eliminated in the Second Phase
9	Santos	25	9	9	7	24	16	+8	27	Eliminated in the Second Phase
10	Coritiba	25	11	4	10	23	25	−2	26	Eliminated in the Second Phase
11	America-RJ	25	8	10	7	27	21	+6	26	Eliminated in the Second Phase
12	Vasco da Gama	25	7	9	9	15	22	−7	23	Eliminated in the Second Phase
13	Bahia	19	5	8	6	14	16	−2	18	Eliminated in the First Phase
14	Flamengo	19	4	10	5	13	17	−4	18	Eliminated in the First Phase
15	Santa Cruz	19	3	11	5	17	23	−6	17	Eliminated in the First Phase
16	Fluminense	19	5	6	8	12	13	−1	16	Eliminated in the First Phase
17	Portuguesa	19	6	3	10	16	24	−8	15	Eliminated in the First Phase
18	América-MG	19	2	9	8	11	19	−8	13	Eliminated in the First Phase
19	Sport Recife	19	4	4	11	10	27	−17	12	Eliminated in the First Phase
20	Ceará	19	2	5	12	5	25	−20	9	Eliminated in the First Phase

Source: rsssf.com

== Sources ==
- Pontes, Ricardo FF (May 13, 2010). "Brazil 1971 Championship - Primeiro Campeonato Nacional de Clubes". RSSSF Brazil.
- 1971 Campeonato Brasileiro Série A at RSSSF
