= List of Clube Atlético Mineiro records and statistics =

Clube Atlético Mineiro, commonly known as Atlético Mineiro or Atlético, is a Brazilian professional football club founded on March 25, 1908, and based in Belo Horizonte, Minas Gerais. The club played its first match in 1908, and its first trophy was the Taça Bueno Brandão, won in 1914. Atlético played its first competitive match on 15 July 1915, when they entered and won the inaugural edition of the Campeonato Mineiro, the state league of Minas Gerais, which it has won a record 48 times. At national level, the club has won the Campeonato Brasileiro Série A twice and has finished second on five occasions. Atlético has also won two Copa do Brasil, one Supercopa do Brasil, one Copa dos Campeões Estaduais and the Copa dos Campeões Brasileiros. In international club football, Atlético has won the Copa Libertadores once, the Recopa Sudamericana once and the Copa CONMEBOL twice, more than any other club. The team has also reached three other continental finals.

João Leite holds Atlético's official appearance record, with 684 matches for the club. Reinaldo is Galo's all-time leading goalscorer with 255 goals since joining the club's first squad in 1973. In the 1977 season, Reinaldo scored 28 goals in 18 appearances, setting the club record for the most Brasileirão goals in a single season, which is the best average goal-per-game record in the Série A. Dadá Maravilha is second in total goals with 211, the only other player to score more than 200 goals for the team. Argentine striker Lucas Pratto is Atlético's all-time foreign goalscorer with 42 goals. Telê Santana is the club's longest-serving head coach, having taken charge of the team for 434 matches during three periods in the 1970s and 1980s. Nelson Campos is Atlético's longest serving president, with nine years in three terms. This list encompasses the major honours won by Atlético Mineiro, also including noted campaigns in addition to records set by the club, its managers and players. The player records section lists the club's leading goalscorers and the players who have made most appearances. It also records individual awards won by Atlético Mineiro players on national and international stage. Club records include first and extreme results, attendance records at the Mineirão and Independência stadiums, as well as the highest transfer fees paid and received by the club.

== Honours ==
Atlético Mineiro's first trophy was the Taça Bueno Brandão, won in 1914. The club was the first winner of the Campeonato Mineiro, the state league of Minas Gerais, a competition it has won a record 50 times; it has also won the Taça Minas Gerais, a state cup, on five occasions. At national level, Atlético has won the Campeonato Brasileiro once, while finishing second on five seasons; it has also won the Copa dos Campeões Estaduais, the Copa dos Campeões Brasileiros and the Copa do Brasil once each, also finishing as runner-up once in the latter. In international competitions, Atlético has won the Copa Libertadores and the Recopa Sudamericana once each, and a record two Copa CONMEBOL trophies; the club has also finished as runner-up of the Copa CONMEBOL, the Copa de Oro and the Copa Master de CONMEBOL. The club has competed in the FIFA Club World Cup once, finishing in third place. The club's most recent title is the 2024 Campeonato Mineiro.

=== International ===
Continental competitions

- Copa Libertadores

Winner (1): 2013
Runner-up (1): 2024

- Copa Sudamericana

Runner-up (1): 2025

- Copa CONMEBOL

Winner (2): 1992, 1997 (record)
Runner-up (1): 1995

- Recopa Sudamericana

Winner (1): 2014

- Copa de Oro

Runner-up (1): 1993

- Copa Master de CONMEBOL

Runner-up (1): 1996

Worldwide competitions

- FIFA Club World Cup

Third place (1): 2013

=== Domestic ===
National competitions

- Campeonato Brasileiro Série A

Winner (3):1937, 1971, 2021
Runner-up (5): 1977, 1980, 1999, 2012, 2015

- Copa do Brasil

Winner (2): 2014, 2021
Runner-up (2): 2016, 2024

- Supercopa do Brasil

Winner (1): 2022

- Copa dos Campeões Brasileiros

Winner (1): 1978 (record)

- Campeonato Brasileiro Série B

Winner (1): 2006

State competitions

- Campeonato Mineiro

Winner (50): 1915, 1926, 1927, 1931, 1932, 1936, 1938, 1939, 1941, 1942, 1946, 1947, 1949, 1950, 1952, 1953, 1954, 1955, 1956, 1958, 1962, 1963, 1970, 1976, 1978, 1979, 1980, 1981, 1982, 1983, 1985, 1986, 1988, 1989, 1991, 1995, 1999, 2000, 2007, 2010, 2012, 2013, 2015, 2017, 2020, 2021, 2022, 2023, 2024, 2025 (Record)
Runner-up (38): 1916, 1917, 1918, 1921, 1928, 1929, 1934, 1935, 1940, 1943, 1944, 1948, 1951, 1966, 1967, 1968, 1969, 1972, 1974, 1975, 1977, 1984, 1987, 1990, 1993, 1994, 1996, 1998, 2001, 2003, 2004, 2008, 2009, 2011, 2014, 2016, 2018, 2019

- Taça Minas Gerais

Winner (5): 1975, 1976, 1979, 1986, 1987 (Record)
Runner-up (4): 1973, 1982, 1983, 1985

- Taça Belo Horizonte

Winner (3): 1970, 1971, 1972 (Record)

- Torneio Início do Campeonato Mineiro

Winner (8): 1928, 1931, 1932, 1939, 1947, 1949, 1950, 1954
Runner-up (12): 1922, 1929, 1935, 1936, 1940, 1941, 1946, 1948, 1953, 1956, 1963, 1964

- Champions Cup (FMF)

Winner (1): 1974.
Runner-up (1): 1999

- Torneio Incentivo Mineiro

Winner (1): 1993

- Taça Bueno Brandão

Winner (1): 1914

- Copa Belo Horizonte

Winner (1): 1959 (record)
Runner-up (2): 1960, 1961

=== Friendly competitions ===
International

- Winter Tournament (Germany)

Winner (1): 1950

- Torneo de León

Winner (1): 1972

- Trofeo Conde de Fenosa

Winner (1): 1976

- Trofeo Cidade de Vigo

Winner (1): 1977

- Trofeo Costa del Sol

Winner (1): 1980

- Tournoi de Paris

Winner (1): 1982

- Trofeo Villa de Bilbao

Winner (1): 1982

- Bern Tournament

Winner (1): 1983

- Amsterdam Tournament

Winner (1): 1984
Runner-up (1): 1985

- Ramón de Carranza Trophy

Winner (1): 1990
Third place (1): 1991

- Copa Centenário de Belo Horizonte

Winner (1): 1997

- Millennium Cup

Winner (1): 1999

- Three Continents Cup (Vietnam)

Winner (1): 1999

- Florida Cup

Winner (1): 2016

National

- Torneio da Inconfidência

Winner (1): 1970

- Torneio Cidade de São José dos Campos

Winner (1): 1970

== Individual records ==
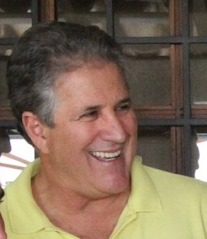
João Leite, holder of the record for most appearances with Atlético Mineiro with 684.

=== Appearances ===
Appearances in competitive matches

- Most total appearances: 684 João Leite (1976–1988, 1991–1992)
- Most national league appearances: 245, Victor (2012–2021)
- Most appearances in international competitions: 53, Victor

Players with most appearances

All matches.

#	Name	Years	Total apps.
1	(Brazil) João Leite	1976–1988, 1991–1992	684
2	(Brazil) Wanderley Paiva	1966–1975	559
3	(Brazil) Luizinho	1978–1989	537
4	(Brazil) Vantuir	1968–1978	507
5	(Brazil) Paulo Roberto Prestes	1986–1996	504
6	(Brazil) Grapete	1964–1975	486
7	(Brazil) Reinaldo	1973–1985	475
8	(Brazil) Victor	2012–2021	421
9	(Brazil) Toninho Cerezo	1973–1983, 1996–1997	400
10	(Brazil) Paulo Isidoro	1973–1979, 1985–1987	399

Managers with most appearances

Title-winning head coaches with most matches in charge of the club.

Name	Matches	Trophies
(Brazil) Telê Santana	434	1 Brasileirão, 2 Campeonato Mineiro
(Brazil) Procópio Cardoso	328	1 Copa CONMEBOL, 3 Campeonato Mineiro
(Brazil) Cuca	290	1 Copa Libertadores, 1 Brasileirão, 1 Copa do Brasil, 4 Campeonato Mineiro
(Brazil) Levir Culpi	286	1 Recopa Sudamericana, 1 Copa do Brasil, 3 Campeonato Mineiro, 1 Série B
(Brazil) Barbatana	227	3 Campeonato Mineiro, 1 Copa dos Campeões Brasileiros
(Uruguay) Ricardo Diéz	171	3 Campeonato Mineiro
(Brazil) Yustrich	159	1 Campeonato Mineiro

=== Goalscorers ===
- Most total goals: 255, Reinaldo (1973–1985);
- Most league goals in a season:
  - National league: 28, Reinaldo (1977) and Guilherme (1999);
  - State league: 29, Dario (1969);
- Most league top scorer awards: 2, Dario (1971, 1972);
- Most goals in a single match:
  - National league: 5, Reinaldo (against Fast Clube 6–2, 1977 Campeonato Brasileiro Série A first stage, 9 November 1977);
  - State league: 9, Jairo (against Palmeiras, 1929 Campeonato Mineiro, 11 August 1929);
- Most goals in international competitions: 20, Hulk

Top goalscorers

All matches.

#	Name	Years	Total Goals
1	(Brazil) Reinaldo	1973–1985	255
2	(Brazil) Dario	1968–1972, 1974, 1978–1979	211
3	(Brazil) Mário de Castro	1926–1931	195
4	(Brazil) Guará	1933–1941	168
5	(Brazil) Lucas Miranda	1944–1954	152
6	(Brazil) Said	1927–1934	142
7	(Brazil) Hulk	2021–2026	140
8	(Brazil) Guilherme	1999–2002, 2003	139
9	(Brazil) Ubaldo	1950–1955, 1958–1961	135
10	(Brazil) Marques	1997–2002, 2005–2006, 2008–2010	133

=== International caps ===
This section refers only to caps won while playing for Atlético Mineiro.

- First capped player: Carlyle, for Brazil against Uruguay on 4 April 1948
- Most caps as an Atlético Mineiro player: Toninho Cerezo, with 52 caps for Brazil
- First player to be called up to the FIFA World Cup finals: Dario, for Brazil (1970 FIFA World Cup, no games played)
- First player to play in the FIFA World Cup finals: Ladislao Mazurkiewicz, for Uruguay (1974 FIFA World Cup, Uruguay 0–2 Netherlands, 15 June 1974)
- First player to score in the FIFA World Cup finals: Reinaldo, for Brazil (1978 FIFA World Cup, Brazil 1–1 Sweden, 3 June 1978)
- Player with most appearances in the FIFA World Cup finals: Toninho Cerezo, with 10 caps for Brazil.

=== Individual recognitions ===
Awards won by footballers while playing for Atlético Mineiro.

FIFA World Cup All-Star Team

- Luizinho (1): 1982

South American Footballer of the Year

- Ronaldinho (1): 2013.

South American Team of the Year

- Ronaldinho (2): 2012, 2013;
- Jô (1): 2013;
- Bernard (1): 2013;
- Réver (1): 2013;
- Marcos Rocha (1): 2013.
- Júnior Alonso (1): 2021;
- Guilherme Arana (1): 2021;
- Hulk (1): 2021.

Copa Libertadores Top Goalscorer

- Jô (1): 2013, 7 goals.

Bola de Ouro

- Toninho Cerezo (2): 1977, 1980;
- Ronaldinho (1): 2012.
- Hulk (1): 2021.

Bola de Prata

- Vaguinho (1): 1970;
- Humberto Monteiro (2): 1970, 1971;
- Wanderley Paiva (1): 1971;
- Paulo Isidoro (1): 1976;
- Toninho Cerezo (3): 1977, 1980, 1976;
- Reinaldo (2): 1977, 1983;
- Osmar Guarnelli: 1979;
- Luizinho: 1980, 1987;
- Nelinho (1): 1983;
- Éder (1): 1983;
- Sérgio Araújo (1): 1986;
- Renato (1): 1987;
- Paulo Sérgio (1): 1989;
- Renaldo (1): 1996;
- Doriva (1): 1997;
- Dedê (1): 1997;
- Bruno (1): 1999;
- Juliano Belletti (1): 1999;
- Caçapa (1): 1999;
- Guilherme (1): 1999;
- Marques (2): 1999, 2001;
- Mancini (1): 2002;
- Diego Tardelli (3): 2009, 2013, 2014;
- Réver (1): 2012;
- Leonardo Silva (1): 2012;
- Ronaldinho (1): 2012;
- Marcos Rocha (2): 2012, 2014;
- Douglas Santos (1): 2015;
- Rafael Carioca (1): 2015;
- Lucas Pratto (1): 2015;
- Fábio Santos (1): 2016;
- Robinho (1): 2016;
- Fred (1): 2016;
- Guilherme Arana (2): 2020, 2021;
- Junior Alonso (2): 2020, 2021;
- Everson (1): 2021;
- Mariano (1): 2021;
- Jair (1): 2021;
- Nacho Fernández (1): 2021;
- Hulk (1): 2021.

Série A Best Newcomer (Bola de Prata)

- Matías Zaracho: 2021.

Série A Best Coach (Bola de Prata)

- Cuca (1): 2021.

Série A Goal of the Year (Bola de Prata)

- Rómulo Otero (1): 2017.

Série A Player of the Year (Prêmio Craque do Brasileirão)

- Hulk (1): 2021.

Série A Team of the Year (Prêmio Craque do Brasileirão)

- Diego Tardelli (2): 2009, 2014;
- Réver (2): 2011, 2012;
- Marcos Rocha (4): 2012, 2013, 2014, 2015;
- Ronaldinho (1): 2012;
- Leonardo Silva (1): 2012;
- Jemerson (1): 2015;
- Douglas Santos (1): 2015;
- Rafael Carioca (1): 2015;
- Robinho (1): 2016;
- Guilherme Arana (2): 2020, 2021;
- Junior Alonso (1): 2021;
- Jair (1): 2021;
- Nacho Fernández (1): 2021;
- Hulk (1): 2021.

Série A Best Newcomer (Prêmio Craque do Brasileirão)

- Bernard: 2012.

Série A Best Foreign Player (Prêmio Craque do Brasileirão)

- Lucas Pratto (1): 2015.

Série A Best Coach (Prêmio Craque do Brasileirão)

- Cuca (1): 2021.

Série A Top Goalscorers

- Dario (2): 1971 and 1972, 17 goals;
- Reinaldo (1): 1977, 28 goals;
- Renaldo (1): 1996, 16 goals;
- Guilherme (1): 1999, 28 goals;
- Diego Tardelli (1): 2009, 19 goals;
- Fred (1): 2016, 14 goals.
- Hulk (1): 2021, 19 goals.
- Paulinho (1): 2023, 20 goals

Copa do Brasil Best Player

- Hulk (1): 2021.

Copa do Brasil Top Goalscorers

- Gérson (2): 1989 and 1991, 7 and 6 goals;
- Hulk (1): 2021, 8 goals.

== Club records ==
=== Matches ===
Firsts

- First match: Atlético Mineiro 3–0 Sport Clube Football (friendly, 21 March 1909);
- First match against a foreign team: Atlético Mineiro 3–1 Vitória de Setúbal (friendly, 1 September 1929);
- First match in the Campeonato Mineiro: Atlético Mineiro 5–0 Yale (1915 Campeonato Mineiro, 11 July 1915);
- First match in the Taça Brasil: Rio Branco 2–2 Atlético Mineiro (1959 Taça Brasil Southern Zone second round, first leg, 13 September 1959);
- First match in the Torneio Roberto Gomes Pedrosa: Cruzeiro 4–0 Atlético Mineiro (1967 Torneio Roberto Gomes Pedrosa first stage, 5 March 1967);
- First match in the Campeonato Brasileiro Série A: Atlético Mineiro 1–1 América Mineiro (1971 Campeonato Brasileiro Série A first stage, 7 August 1971);
- First match in the Copa do Brasil: América (RN) 0–3 Atlético Mineiro (1989 Copa do Brasil first stage, 19 July 1989);
- First match in international club competitions: Atlético Mineiro 2–2 São Paulo (1972 Copa Libertadores group stage, 30 January 1972).

Wins

- Biggest win: 13–0, against Calafate, (1929 Campeonato Mineiro, 11 August 1929);
- Biggest win in the Campeonato Mineiro: 13–0, against Calafate, (1929 Campeonato Mineiro, 11 August 1929);
- Biggest win in the Taça Brasil: 5–1, against Goytacaz, (1967 Taça Brasil Central Zone semi-finals, second leg, 11 August 1929);
- Biggest win in the Torneio Roberto Gomes Pedrosa: 5–2, against São Paulo (1969 Torneio Roberto Gomes Pedrosa first stage, 21 September 1969);
- Biggest win in the Campeonato Brasileiro Série A: 7–1, against Ferroviária (1982 Campeonato Brasileiro Série A first group stage, 14 February 1982);
- Biggest win in the Copa do Brasil: 11–0, against Caiçara (1991 Copa do Brasil first stage, second leg, 28 February 1991);
- Biggest win in international club competitions: 6–0, against Mineros (1995 Copa CONMEBOL quarter-finals, first leg, 14 November 1995) and Cobreloa (2000 Copa Libertadores group stage, 5 April 2000).

Defeats

- Biggest defeat: 2–11, against Corinthians (friendly, 12 October 1929);
- Biggest defeat in the Campeonato Mineiro: 0–5, against Cruzeiro (2008 Campeonato Mineiro finals, first leg, 27 April 2008 and 2009 Campeonato Mineiro finals, first leg, 26 April 2009);
- Biggest defeat in the Taça Brasil: 1–5, against Santos (1964 Taça Brasil quarter-finals, second leg, 25 October 1964);
- Biggest defeat in the Torneio Roberto Gomes Pedrosa: 0–4, against Cruzeiro (1967 Torneio Roberto Gomes Pedrosa first stage, 5 March 1967);
- Biggest defeat in the Campeonato Brasileiro Série A: 0–6, against Sport (2000 Copa João Havelange first stage, 19 November 2000);
- Biggest defeat in the Copa do Brasil: 0–5, against Palmeiras (1996 Copa do Brasil round of 16, second leg, 16 April 1996);
- Biggest defeat in international club competitions: 0–4, against Rosario Central (1995 Copa CONMEBOL finals, second leg, 19 December 1995);
- Most consecutive home matches without defeats: 54 (3 September 2011 to 31 July 2013).

=== Attendances ===
Split-crowd derbies are excluded.

- Highest attendance at the Mineirão (all matches): 115,142 (against Flamengo, friendly, 13 February 1980);
- Highest attendance at the Mineirão (competitive matches): 113,749 (against Santos, Série A, 15 May 1983);
- Highest attendance at the Independência (after renovation): 22,342 (against Cruzeiro, Campeonato Mineiro, 6 April 2014).
- Highest attendance at the Arena MRV: 44,876 (against Flamengo, Copa do Brasil, 10 November 2024).

=== Transfers ===
- Highest transfer fee paid: André, from Dynamo Kyiv, €8 million in 2012;
- Highest transfer fee received: Bernard, to Shakhtar Donetsk, €25 million in 2013.

== International competition statistics ==
=== By competition ===
Clube Atlético Mineiro record in international club football by competition
Competition	E	P	W	D	L	GF	GA	GD	W%	F	FW	FL
Copa Libertadores	14	138	64	41	33	207	133	+74	46.38	2	1	1
Copa CONMEBOL	5	36	19	9	8	67	33	+34	52.78	3	2	1
Copa de Oro	1	3	0	2	1	0	1	−1	0.00	1	0	1
Copa Master de CONMEBOL	1	2	0	1	1	0	3	−3	0.00	1	0	1
Copa Mercosur	1	10	5	2	3	18	18	+0	50.00	0	0	0
Copa Sudamericana	11	55	23	14	18	69	60	+9	41.82	1	0	0
Recopa Sudamericana	1	2	2	0	0	5	3	+2	100.00	1	1	0
FIFA Club World Cup	1	2	1	0	1	4	5	−1	50.00	0	0	0
Total	35	248	114	69	65	370	256	+114	45.97	8	4	4

Key

- E = Entries
- P = Matches played
- W = Matches won
- D = Matches drawn
- L = Matches lost
- GF = Goals for
- GA = Goals against
- GD = Goal difference
- W% = Winning percentage
- F = Finals
- FW = Finals won
- FL = Finals lost
