= Atlético Mineiro–Flamengo rivalry =

Football rivalry in Brazil

- Atlético Mineiro Flamengo
- Location: Brazil
- First meeting: 16 June 1929; Friendly match Atlético 2–3 Flamengo
- Latest meeting: 26 October 2026; Brazil Série A Flamengo 3–2 Atlético
- Stadiums: Arena MRV (Atlético Mineiro); Maracanã (Flamengo)

Statistics
- Total meetings: 137
- Top scorer: Zico (9)
- All-time series: Atlético Mineiro: 43; Draws: 35; Flamengo: 59
- Largest victory: Atlético 6–1 Flamengo; Brasileirão Série A 14 November 2004

The Atlético Mineiro–Flamengo rivalry is a high-profile inter-state rivalry between Brazilian professional football clubs Atlético Mineiro and Flamengo. The clubs first played against each other in 1929, but until regular competitions were introduced in Brazilian football in 1959, the encounters were played at friendly level, since they come from different states: Flamengo is from Rio de Janeiro, while Atlético Mineiro hails from Minas Gerais. The rivalry developed in the 1980s from numerous controversial encounters between the two clubs in that decade's Campeonato Brasileiro and Copa Libertadores editions. It remained through the following years, and is considered the biggest interstate rivalry in Brazilian football.

== History ==
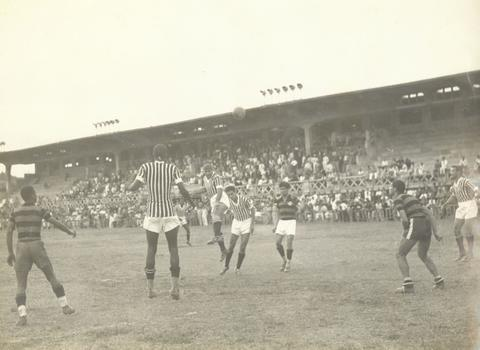
A match between Atlético Mineiro and Flamengo at the Estádio Presidente Antônio Carlos, 1943.

The first encounter between the two teams happened on 16 June 1929, a friendly in Atlético's home ground, the Presidente Antônio Carlos stadium, which Flamengo won 3–2. Atlético's first victory came in 1934, 3–1 in Rio de Janeiro, also in friendly game. The first regular national championship in Brazilian football was the Taça Brasil, introduced in 1959. Until then, matches between clubs from the states of Rio de Janeiro and Minas Gerais were mostly friendly, with an exception happening during the 1937 Copa dos Campeões Estaduais. The first time Flamengo and Atlético played for a national competition was on 2 April 1967, for that year's Torneio Roberto Gomes Pedrosa, a match which Atlético won 3–1 at the Mineirão. The clubs also took part in the Torneio do Povo, a competition organised by the Brazilian Sports Confederation from 1971 to 1973 between Brazil's most popular football clubs. Flamengo won the 1972 edition of the tournament, played in a single round-robin, with Atlético Mineiro finishing as runner-up.

A charity match played between the two clubs in 1979, in which Pelé played for Flamengo, helped ignite the rivalry. The match was won by the Rio de Janeiro club 5–1, and Atlético Mineiro players were irritated by what they saw as "excessive force" for a friendly game. The rivalry, however, truly commenced in the 1980s, when both Atlético and Flamengo had strong teams and provided many players to the Brazil national team. In 1980, the teams were finalists of the Campeonato Brasileiro Série A, Atlético's third final and Flamengo's first. Atlético had the best record in the first stages of the competition, but Flamengo had the best one in the second, which meant the latter could tie the final series to win the title. Atlético won the first leg 1–0 at the Mineirão, but in the second leg, played at the Maracanã, Flamengo won 3–2 with a late goal by Nunes and won its first Série A. During the match, three Atlético players were sent off, among them Reinaldo, who received a straight red card after scoring twice.

As Brasileirão champion and runner-up, both clubs qualified for the 1981 Copa Libertadores, in which they were drawn in a group with Paraguayan teams Olimpia and Cerro Porteño. The two encounters between the Brazilian clubs ended 2–2, and both won two and drew two matches against the Paraguayans. A play-off match in a neutral stadium had to be played between Atlético and Flamengo to decide which one would advance to the semifinals.

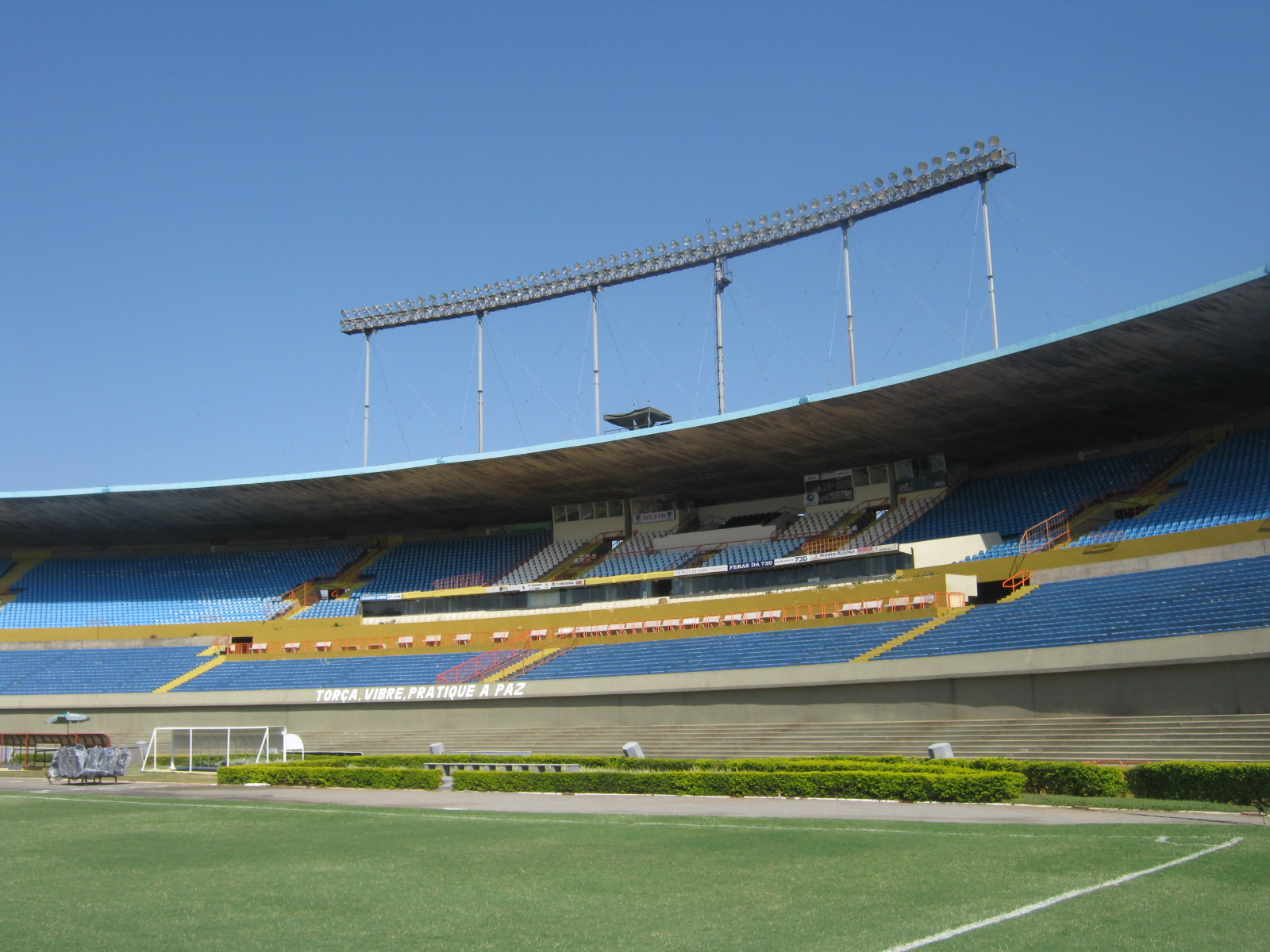
Estádio Serra Dourada (pictured), in Goiânia, was the venue of a controversial playoff match between Atlético Mineiro and Flamengo in the 1981 Copa Libertadores.

The match was played on 21 August at the Serra Dourada Stadium, in Goiânia, a ground selected by Flamengo. Atlético chose the referee of the encounter, José Roberto Wright. In the match, Atlético forward and best player Reinaldo received a straight red card from after fouling Flamengo's Zico at 33 minutes, in what was described as a "normal" foul and "without much violence". After the foul, Wright then sent off Atlético player Éder for complaining, after which the game was stopped. A turmoil started, in which Atlético's Palhinha and Chicão were also sent off, for insulting the referee. Left with seven players, Atlético's goalkeeper João Leite simulated an injury at the restart of the match, but Wright refused to stop the game. Atlético defender Osmar then held the ball with his hands, preventing the restart, for which he too was sent off and the match ended at the 37-minute mark, because Atlético had less than seven players on the field. The match ended in a 0–0 draw, which meant qualification for Flamengo, as it had the best goal difference in the group stage.

Atlético tried to appeal to a CONMEBOL court for annulment of the match, unsuccessfully. According to Wright, who until before the match was considered the country's best referee, Reinaldo's foul was indeed "normal" but he was sent off because of a previous warning. He also stated that Éder, Palhinha and Chicão were "stickers to indiscipline", and that he had to send Éder off as to not lose control of the match. The episode and referee Wright's performance were described by Brazilian and South American media as "shameful", "deplorable" and "opprobrium". Flamengo advanced to the semi-finals and went on to win the competition.

From then on, enmity marked the encounters between the two clubs in the 1980s, a fact that remained over the following decades. In the 1986 Brasileirão, Atlético eliminated Flamengo in the round of 16, winning the second leg 1–0 at the Mineirão, after a 0–0 draw at Maracanã. In the following year, Flamengo eliminated Atlético in the semi-finals of the Copa União, winning both legs, 3–2 in the first at the Mineirão, and 1–0 at the Maracanã.

The rivalry's largest win happened in the 2004 Campeonato Brasileiro, in a match played at the Ipatingão, won by Atlético 6–1. In 2006, Flamengo once again eliminated Atlético in a knockout stage, this time the quarter-finals of the Copa do Brasil, with a 4–1 aggregate score. In 2009, while both teams were in contention for the Série A title, a 3–1 Flamengo victory at the Mineirão, for the competition's 34th round, proved significant for the outcome of the season. The encounter, which included an olympic goal by Flamengo's Dejan Petković (who had played for the Belo Horizonte club in the previous season), marked Atlético's decline and Flamengo's rise in the competition. Prior to the game, Atlético was third and Flamengo fourth in the league table, with the positions being reversed after the match. Eventually, Atlético finished the season in seventh place after losing its four remaining matches, while Flamengo were crowned champions for the sixth time.

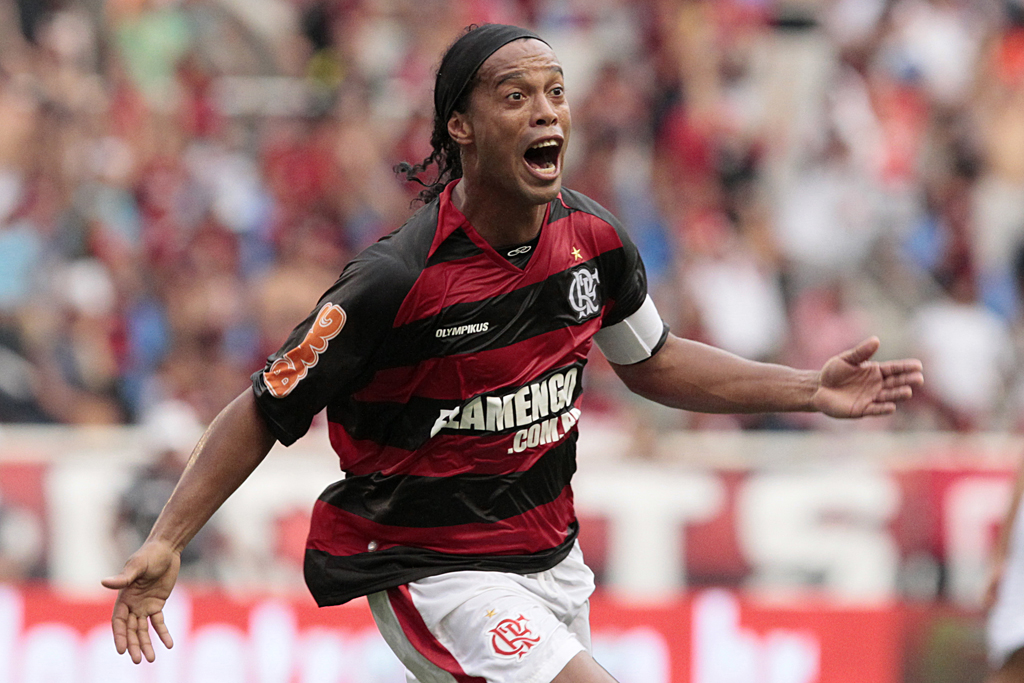
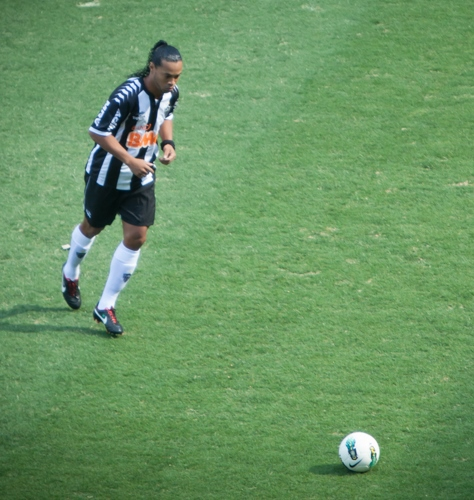
Ronaldinho playing for Flamengo in 2011 (left) and for Atlético Mineiro in 2012

Three years later, Ronaldinho unilaterally ended his contract with Flamengo, claiming lack of payment by the club. A few days later, he joined Atlético, a move which prompted Flamengo director Zinho to say that he wanted "any team except Atlético" to win that year's Brasileirão. Atlético eventually finished second in the competition behind Flamengo's local rivals Fluminense, but Ronaldinho won three titles with the Minas Gerais club, including the 2013 Copa Libertadores. In the 2014 Copa do Brasil semifinals between the two teams, Flamengo won the first leg at the Maracanã 2–0, and scored first in the second one at the Mineirão. Atlético managed to make a 4–1 comeback with three goals in the second half and making a 4–3 aggregate score, to advance to the finals.

In the 2021 Campeonato Brasileiro, Atlético Mineiro won the league after 50 years and Flamengo were the runners-up, 13 points behind it.

At the beginning of the 2022 season, Atlético, which won both the Brazilian League and the Brazilian Cup in 2021, and Flamengo, the runners-up of the league, contested the Supercopa do Brasil at the Arena Pantanal, in Cuiabá. After a 2–2 draw on regular time, Atlético won the title after a long penalty shootout ended in 8–7.

They faced each other in the 2024 Copa do Brasil finals, the overall third final in the history of the rivalry. Flamengo won both legs and clinched its fifth cup, and the first ever trophy at the Arena MRV, with a 4–1 aggregate score.

== Statistics ==
As of 26 October 2026

=== Head-to-head summary ===
Competition	Matches	Flamengo wins	Draws	Atlético wins
Campeonato Brasileiro Série A	82	33	18	31
Copa do Brasil	10	6	1	3
Supercopa do Brasil	1	0	1	0
Copa Libertadores	3	0	3	0
Primeira Liga	1	1	0	0
Total (official)	97	40	23	34
Torneio do Povo	4	2	2	0
Other friendly matches and competitions	35	16	10	9
Unknown game	1	1	0	0
Total (Note: Atlético Mineiro's records includes a friendly match on 18 January 1970 (won by Flamengo 2–1) played by their reserve teams and an unidentified match also won by Flamengo, by 3–2. Neither of these two games are included in Flamengo's version of the fixture.)	137	59	35	43

=== Records ===
==== All-time top goalscorers ====
- In all matches:
  - For Flamengo: Zico (9 goals);
  - For Atlético Mineiro: Reinaldo (7 goals).
- In official matches:
  - For Flamengo: Arrascaeta, Bruno Henrique and Nunes (5 goals);
  - For Atlético Mineiro: Reinaldo (7 goals).

==== Scores and sequences ====
- Biggest win:
  - For Flamengo: Flamengo 5–1 Atlético Mineiro, (Friendlies, 20 December 1930 and 6 April 1979);
  - For Atlético Mineiro: Atlético Mineiro 6–1 Flamengo (2004 Campeonato Brasileiro Série A, 14 November 2004).
- Biggest away win:
  - For Flamengo: Atlético Mineiro 0–4 Flamengo, (2026 Campeonato Brasileiro Série A, 26 April 2026);
  - For Atlético Mineiro: Flamengo 0–3 Atlético Mineiro (Campeonato Brasileiro Série A, 11 October 2008 and 29 November 2023).
- Biggest Campeonato Brasileiro Série A win:
  - For Flamengo: Atlético Mineiro 0–4 Flamengo, (2026 Campeonato Brasileiro Série A, 26 April 2026);
  - For Atlético Mineiro: Atlético Mineiro 6–1 Flamengo, (2004 Campeonato Brasileiro Série A, 14 November 2004).
- Biggest Copa do Brasil win:
  - For Flamengo: Flamengo 4–1 Atlético Mineiro (2006 Copa do Brasil quarter-finals, first leg, 26 April 2006);
  - For Atlético Mineiro: Atlético Mineiro 4–1 Flamengo, (2014 Copa do Brasil semi-finals, second leg, 5 November 2014).
- Biggest unbeaten run:
  - For Flamengo: 7 games (15 November 1955 to 6 February 1966, and 1 June 1980 to 7 March 1982);
  - For Atlético Mineiro: 6 games (16 November 1966 to 15 October 1969, 14 March 1982 to 1 November 1987, 7 September 1989 to 19 November 1995).
- Most consecutive wins:
  - For Flamengo: 4 wins (8 August 1996 to 3 October 1998);
  - For Atlético Mineiro: 4 wins (5 November 2014 to 20 September 2015).

==== Attendance ====
The following are the ten largest attendances in the history of the fixture.

Rank	Attendance	Date	Venue	Score	Competition
1	154,355	1 June 1980	Maracanã	Flamengo 3–2 Atlético Mineiro	1980 Campeonato Brasileiro Série A
2	139,953	6 April 1979	Maracanã	Flamengo 5–1 Atlético Mineiro	Friendly
3	118,162	29 November 1987	Maracanã	Flamengo 1–0 Atlético Mineiro	Copa União
4	115,142	13 February 1980	Mineirão	Atlético Mineiro 2–1 Flamengo	Friendly
5	107,497	4 February 1987	Mineirão	Atlético Mineiro 1–0 Flamengo	1986 Campeonato Brasileiro Série A
6	90,028	28 May 1980	Mineirão	Atlético Mineiro 1–0 Flamengo	1980 Campeonato Brasileiro Série A
7	84,929	2 December 1987	Mineirão	Atlético Mineiro 2–3 Flamengo	1987 Copa União
8	81,867	25 March 1981	Mineirão	Atlético Mineiro 0–0 Flamengo	1981 Campeonato Brasileiro Série A
9	77,387	11 October 2008	Maracanã	Flamengo 0–3 Atlético Mineiro	2008 Campeonato Brasileiro Série A
10	71,450	7 March 1982	Maracanã	Flamengo 2–1 Atlético Mineiro	1982 Campeonato Brasileiro Série A

== Head-to-head results ==
=== Official matches ===
#	Season	Date	Competition	Stadium	Home Team	Result	Away Team	Attendance	H2H
1	1967	2 April 1967	Brasileirão (RGP)	Mineirão	Atlético Mineiro	3–1	Flamengo	31,450	+1
2	1968	16 October 1968	Brasileirão (RGP)	Mineirão	Atlético Mineiro	0–0	Flamengo	26,127	+1
3	1969	15 October 1969	Brasileirão (RGP)	Maracanã	Flamengo	1–3	Atlético Mineiro	35,980	+2
4	1970	2 December 1970	Brasileirão (RGP)	Maracanã	Flamengo	1–0	Atlético Mineiro	69,156	+1
5	1971	21 August 1971	Brasileirão	Maracanã	Flamengo	0–1	Atlético Mineiro	29,554	+2
6	1972	21 September 1972	Brasileirão	Maracanã	Flamengo	1–0	Atlético Mineiro	14,000	+1
7	1973	16 September 1973	Brasileirão	Mineirão	Atlético Mineiro	3–0	Flamengo	31,447	+2
8	1973	29 November 1973	Brasileirão	Mineirão	Atlético Mineiro	2–1	Flamengo	23,067	+3
9	1975	4 November 1975	Brasileirão	Mineirão	Atlético Mineiro	1–1	Flamengo	25,249	+3
10	1976	31 October 1976	Brasileirão	Maracanã	Flamengo	2–1	Atlético Mineiro	67,615	+2
11	1980	28 May 1980	Brasileirão	Mineirão	Atlético Mineiro	1–0	Flamengo	90,028	+3
12	1980	1 June 1980	Brasileirão	Maracanã	Flamengo	3–2	Atlético Mineiro	154,355	+2
13	1981	7 March 1981	Brasileirão	Maracanã	Flamengo	2–1	Atlético Mineiro	51,389	+1
14	1981	25 March 1981	Brasileirão	Mineirão	Atlético Mineiro	0–0	Flamengo	81,867	+1
15	1981	3 July 1981	Copa Libertadores	Mineirão	Atlético Mineiro	2–2	Flamengo	63,135	+1
16	1981	7 August 1981	Copa Libertadores	Maracanã	Flamengo	2–2	Atlético Mineiro	62,763	+1
17	1981	21 August 1981	Copa Libertadores	Serra Dourada	Flamengo	0–0 (Note: The match was ended in the 37th minute after 5 Atlético players were sent off. Even though the points were awarded to Flamengo, both clubs list this game as a draw in their records.)	Atlético Mineiro	71,157	+1
18	1982	7 March 1982	Brasileirão	Maracanã	Flamengo	2–1	Atlético Mineiro	71,450	0
19	1982	14 March 1982	Brasileirão	Mineirão	Atlético Mineiro	3–1	Flamengo	61,830	+1
20	1985	27 January 1985	Brasileirão	Mineirão	Atlético Mineiro	1–1	Flamengo	50,108	+1
21	1985	10 March 1985	Brasileirão	Maracanã	Flamengo	0–1	Atlético Mineiro	34,102	+2
22	1986	1 February 1987	Brasileirão	Maracanã	Flamengo	1–1	Atlético Mineiro	48,364	+2
23	1986	4 February 1987	Brasileirão	Mineirão	Atlético Mineiro	1–0	Flamengo	107,497	+3
24	1987	1 November 1987	Brasileirão (Copa União)	Mineirão	Atlético Mineiro	1–0	Flamengo	50,483	+4
25	1987	29 November 1987	Brasileirão (Copa União)	Maracanã	Flamengo	1–0	Atlético Mineiro	118,162	+3
26	1987	2 December 1987	Brasileirão (Copa União)	Mineirão	Atlético Mineiro	2–3	Flamengo	84,929	+2
27	1988	18 December 1988	Brasileirão	Maracanã	Flamengo	2–0	Atlético Mineiro	29,711	+1
28	1989	7 September 1989	Brasileirão	Maracanã	Flamengo	0–0	Atlético Mineiro	23,535	+1
29	1990	22 September 1990	Brasileirão	Maracanã	Flamengo	1–1	Atlético Mineiro	19,968	+1
30	1991	30 March 1991	Brasileirão	Gávea	Flamengo	1–3	Atlético Mineiro	5,000	+2
31	1992	11 March 1992	Brasileirão	Mineirão	Atlético Mineiro	1–1	Flamengo	18,995	+2
32	1995	19 November 1995	Brasileirão	Mineirão	Atlético Mineiro	2–1	Flamengo	67,799	+3
33	1996	14 August 1996	Brasileirão	Maracanã	Flamengo	2–1	Atlético Mineiro	9,767	+2
34	1997	12 August 1997	Brasileirão	Mineirão	Atlético Mineiro	2–4	Flamengo	18,506	+1
35	1998	3 October 1998	Brasileirão	Maracanã	Flamengo	3–2	Atlético Mineiro	7,467	0
36	1999	29 September 1999	Brasileirão	Mineirão	Atlético Mineiro	3–0	Flamengo	70,078	+1
37	2000	2 September 2000	Brasileirão	Mineirão	Atlético Mineiro	1–2	Flamengo	24,531	0
38	2001	21 October 2001	Brasileirão	Serejão	Flamengo	1–2	Atlético Mineiro	17,713	+1
39	2002	22 September 2002	Brasileirão	Mineirão	Atlético Mineiro	0–3	Flamengo	60,045	0
40	2003	13 July 2003	Brasileirão	Mineirão	Atlético Mineiro	1–0	Flamengo	17,640	+1
41	2003	6 November 2003	Brasileirão	Maracanã	Flamengo	3–2	Atlético Mineiro	4,022	0
42	2004	24 July 2004	Brasileirão	Raulino de Oliveira	Flamengo	0–0	Atlético Mineiro	4,688	0
43	2004	14 November 2004	Brasileirão	Ipatingão	Atlético Mineiro	6–1	Flamengo	21,360	+1
44	2005	3 July 2005	Brasileirão	Mineirão	Atlético Mineiro	3–1	Flamengo	28,407	+2
45	2005	11 October 2005	Brasileirão	Luso Brasileiro	Flamengo	1–2	Atlético Mineiro	14,999	+3
46	2006	26 April 2006	Copa do Brasil	Maracanã	Flamengo	4–1	Atlético Mineiro	24,703	+2
47	2006	3 May 2006	Copa do Brasil	Mineirão	Atlético Mineiro	0–0	Flamengo	44,746	+2
48	2007	4 July 2007	Brasileirão	Mineirão	Atlético Mineiro	1–1	Flamengo	21,370	+2
49	2007	29 September 2007	Brasileirão	Maracanã	Flamengo	1–0	Atlético Mineiro	41,783	+1
50	2008	9 July 2008	Brasileirão	Mineirão	Atlético Mineiro	1–1	Flamengo	33,359	+1
51	2008	11 October 2008	Brasileirão	Maracanã	Flamengo	0–3	Atlético Mineiro	77,387	+2
52	2009	30 July 2009	Brasileirão	Maracanã	Flamengo	3–1	Atlético Mineiro	26,934	+1
53	2009	8 November 2009	Brasileirão	Mineirão	Atlético Mineiro	1–3	Flamengo	63,285	0
54	2010	26 August 2010	Brasileirão	Maracanã	Flamengo	0–0	Atlético Mineiro	9,566	0
55	2010	13 November 2010	Brasileirão	Arena do Jacaré	Atlético Mineiro	4–1	Flamengo	16,465	+1
56	2011	25 June 2011	Brasileirão	Nilton Santos	Flamengo	4–1	Atlético Mineiro	14,054	0
57	2011	21 September 2011	Brasileirão	Arena do Jacaré	Atlético Mineiro	1–1	Flamengo	13,849	0
58	2012	26 September 2012	Brasileirão	Nilton Santos	Flamengo	2–1	Atlético Mineiro	34,116	+1
59	2012	31 October 2012	Brasileirão	Independência	Atlético Mineiro	1–1	Flamengo	19,945	+1
60	2013	4 August 2013	Brasileirão	Mané Garrincha	Flamengo	3–0	Atlético Mineiro	31,548	+2
61	2013	20 October 2013	Brasileirão	Independência	Atlético Mineiro	1–0	Flamengo	14,203	+1
62	2014	20 August 2014	Brasileirão	Maracanã	Flamengo	2–1	Atlético Mineiro	37,726	+2
63	2014	29 October 2014	Copa do Brasil	Maracanã	Flamengo	2–0	Atlético Mineiro	40,909	+3
64	2014	5 November 2014	Copa do Brasil	Mineirão	Atlético Mineiro	4–1	Flamengo	41,352	+2
65	2014	19 November 2014	Brasileirão	Independência	Atlético Mineiro	4–0	Flamengo	10,123	+1
66	2015	20 June 2015	Brasileirão	Maracanã	Flamengo	0–2	Atlético Mineiro	36,774	0
67	2015	20 September 2015	Brasileirão	Independência	Atlético Mineiro	4–1	Flamengo	20,203	+1
68	2016	27 January 2016	Primeira Liga	Mineirão	Atlético Mineiro	0–2	Flamengo	30,378	0
69	2016	10 July 2016	Brasileirão	Mané Garrincha	Flamengo	2–0	Atlético Mineiro	23,390	+1
70	2016	29 October 2016	Brasileirão	Mineirão	Atlético Mineiro	2–2	Flamengo	48,157	+1
71	2017	13 May 2017	Brasileirão	Maracanã	Flamengo	1–1	Atlético Mineiro	42,575	+1
72	2017	13 August 2017	Brasileirão	Independência	Atlético Mineiro	2–0	Flamengo	16,521	0
73	2018	26 May 2018	Brasileirão	Independência	Atlético Mineiro	0–1	Flamengo	15,797	+1
74	2018	23 September 2018	Brasileirão	Maracanã	Flamengo	2–1	Atlético Mineiro	36,018	+2
75	2019	18 May 2019	Brasileirão	Independência	Atlético Mineiro	2–1	Flamengo	13,616	+1
76	2019	10 October 2019	Brasileirão	Maracanã	Flamengo	3–1	Atlético Mineiro	58,788	+2
77	2020	9 August 2020	Brasileirão	Maracanã	Flamengo	0–1	Atlético Mineiro	0	+1
78	2020	8 November 2020	Brasileirão	Mineirão	Atlético Mineiro	4–0	Flamengo	0	0
79	2021	7 July 2021	Brasileirão	Mineirão	Atlético Mineiro	2–1	Flamengo	0	+1
80	2021	30 October 2021	Brasileirão	Maracanã	Flamengo	1–0	Atlético Mineiro	24,696	0
81	2022	20 February 2022	Supercopa do Brasil	Arena Pantanal	Atlético Mineiro	2–2 (8–7 p)	Flamengo	32,028	0
82	2022	19 June 2022	Brasileirão	Mineirão	Atlético Mineiro	2–0	Flamengo	55,373	+1
83	2022	22 June 2022	Copa do Brasil	Mineirão	Atlético Mineiro	2–1	Flamengo	53,953	+2
84	2022	13 July 2022	Copa do Brasil	Maracanã	Flamengo	2–0	Atlético Mineiro	68,747	+1
85	2022	15 October 2022	Brasileirão	Maracanã	Flamengo	1–0	Atlético Mineiro	51,179	0
86	2023	29 July 2023	Brasileirão	Independência	Atlético Mineiro	1–2	Flamengo	22,441	+1
87	2023	29 November 2023	Brasileirão	Maracanã	Flamengo	0–3	Atlético Mineiro	65,305	0
88	2024	3 July 2024	Brasileirão	Arena MRV	Atlético Mineiro	2–4	Flamengo	39,993	+1
89	2024	3 November 2024	Copa do Brasil	Maracanã	Flamengo	3–1	Atlético Mineiro	67,459	+2
90	2024	10 November 2024	Copa do Brasil	Arena MRV	Atlético Mineiro	0–1	Flamengo	44,876	+3
91	2024	13 November 2024	Brasileirão	Maracanã	Flamengo	0–0	Atlético Mineiro	63,441	+3
92	2025	27 July 2025	Brasileirão	Maracanã	Flamengo	1–0	Atlético Mineiro	54,550	+4
93	2025	31 July 2025	Copa do Brasil	Maracanã	Flamengo	0–1	Atlético Mineiro	64,681	+3
94	2025	6 August 2025	Copa do Brasil	Arena MRV	Atlético Mineiro	0–1 (4–3 p)	Flamengo	38,873	+4
95	2025	25 November 2025	Brasileirão	Arena MRV	Atlético Mineiro	1–1	Flamengo	18,321	+4
96	2026	26 April 2026	Brasileirão	Arena MRV	Atlético Mineiro	0–4	Flamengo	28,148	+5
97	2026	26 October 2026	Brasileirão	Maracanã	Flamengo	3–2	Atlético Mineiro	60,624	+6

=== Unofficial meetings ===
#	Date	Competition	Stadium	Home Team	Result	Away Team
1	16 June 1929	Troféu Prefeito Christiano Machado	Antônio Carlos	Atlético Mineiro	2–3	Flamengo
2	22 June 1930	Friendly match	Antônio Carlos	Atlético Mineiro	2–2	Flamengo
3	25 March 1934	Friendly match	Antônio Carlos	Atlético Mineiro	3–1	Flamengo
4	10 March 1935	Friendly match	Antônio Carlos	Atlético Mineiro	4–0	Flamengo
5	3 May 1936	Friendly match	Laranjeiras	Flamengo	2–0	Atlético Mineiro
6	11 April 1937	Friendly match	Laranjeiras	Flamengo	5–3	Atlético Mineiro
7	18 August 1938	Friendly match	Laranjeiras	Flamengo	5–1	Atlético Mineiro
8	9 June 1943	Friendly match	Antônio Carlos	Atlético Mineiro	1–1	Flamengo
9	9 February 1947	Friendly match	Antônio Carlos	Atlético Mineiro	0–2	Flamengo
10	19 June 1947	Friendly match	Laranjeiras	Flamengo	1–2	Atlético Mineiro
11	15 November 1949	Friendly match	Gávea	Flamengo	1–1	Atlético Mineiro
12	18 January 1951	Friendly match	General Severiano	Flamengo	3–3	Atlético Mineiro
13	27 January 1951	Friendly match	Alameda	Atlético Mineiro	2–2	Flamengo
14	8 February 1953	Friendly match	Independência	Atlético Mineiro	1–2	Flamengo
15	16 July 1953	Friendly match	Justiniano de Mello e Silva	Flamengo	0–1	Atlético Mineiro
16	5 June 1955	Torneio Triangular de Belo Horizonte	Independência	Atlético Mineiro	2–1	Flamengo
17	15 November 1955	Friendly (Flamengo's 60th anniversary)	Maracanã	Flamengo	4–0	Atlético Mineiro
18	11 July 1957	Friendly match	Alameda	Atlético Mineiro	1–2	Flamengo
19	17 December 1960	Torneio Quadrangular Ricardo Serran	Independência	Atlético Mineiro	2–2	Flamengo
20	23 March 1963	Friendly (Atlético's 55th anniversary)	Independência	Atlético Mineiro	1–2	Flamengo
21	3 June 1965	Torneio Hexagonal de Belo Horizonte	Independência	Atlético Mineiro	0–0	Flamengo
22	20 January 1966	Friendly match	Independência	Atlético Mineiro	1–3	Flamengo
23	6 February 1966	Torneio Quadrangular Magalhães Pinto	Independência	Atlético Mineiro	0–1	Flamengo
24	16 November 1966	Friendly match	Mineirão	Atlético Mineiro	2–1	Flamengo
25	21 February 1967	Friendly match	Mineirão	Atlético Mineiro	2–2	Flamengo
26	10 December 1968	Friendly match	Mineirão	Atlético Mineiro	2–2	Flamengo
27	18 January 1970	Friendly match	Mineirão	Atlético Mineiro	1–2 (Note: Atlético and Flamengo played this game with their reserve teams, as both had other games played by their main teams in that same day. This match is not included by Flamengo in their records of the fixture.)	Flamengo
28	24 January 1971	Torneio do Povo	Mineirão	Atlético Mineiro	0–0	Flamengo
29	19 February 1971	Torneio do Povo	Mineirão	Atlético Mineiro	3–3	Flamengo
30	23 January 1972	Friendly match	Mineirão	Atlético Mineiro	2–1	Flamengo
31	6 February 1972	Torneio do Povo	Maracanã	Flamengo	2–0	Atlético Mineiro
32	1 May 1972	Taça do Trabalho	Mineirão	Atlético Mineiro	0–0	Flamengo
33	28 January 1973	Torneio do Povo	Mineirão	Atlético Mineiro	2–3	Flamengo
34	6 August 1978	Friendly match	Mineirão	Atlético Mineiro	0–2	Flamengo
35	6 April 1979	Friendly match	Maracanã	Flamengo	5–1	Atlético Mineiro
36	13 February 1980	Friendly match	Mineirão	Atlético Mineiro	2–1	Flamengo
37	1 May 1980	Friendly match	Mineirão	Atlético Mineiro	0–1	Flamengo
38	8 February 1995	Friendly match	Mineirão	Atlético Mineiro	3–2	Flamengo
39	10 June 1997	Torneio Quadrangular de Brasília	Mané Garrincha	Flamengo	1–0	Atlético Mineiro

== Honours ==
Competitions	Atlético Mineiro	Flamengo
Brazilian Championship/Union Cup	3	9
Brazil Cup	2	5
Supercopa do Brasil	1	3
Brazilian Champions Cup	-	1
Champions Cup (CBD)	1	-
Copa Libertadores	1	4
Recopa Sudamericana	1	1
Copa Conmebol	2	-
Copa Mercosur	-	1
Copa de Oro	-	1
FIFA Club World Cup/Intercontinental Cup	-	1
Total	11	26

Note (1): Flamengo considers the 1987 Copa União as a Brazilian Championship but, although it is considered an official title, it is not officially considered a Brazilian Championship edition by CBF. Therefore, Flamengo have, officially, 7 Brazilian Championship titles.

Note (2): Although the Intercontinental Cup and the FIFA Club World Cup are officially different tournaments, they are the official competitions that grant the title of world champion.
