= Bazzoni =

Bazzoni is an Italian surname. Notable people with the surname include:

- Alberto Bazzoni (1889–1973), Italian sculptor
- Camillo Bazzoni (1934–2020), Italian cinematographer and film director
- Chiara Bazzoni (born 1984), Italian sprinter (400 meters)
- Luigi Bazzoni (1929–2012), Italian director and screenwriter
- Luiz Bazzoni (1914–2002), Brazilian footballer
- Raffaele Bazzoni (born 1953), Italian politician
