= List of Clube Atlético Mineiro presidents =

Clube Atlético Mineiro is a football club based in Belo Horizonte, Brazil that competes in Campeonato Brasileiro, the top tier of the Brazilian football league system, as well as in the Campeonato Mineiro, the premier state league of Minas Gerais. Since its founding in 1908, the club has had 46 different presidents, including acting ones. The club is formally a civil association, managed by a Board which is elected for a three-year term by a Deliberative Council.

Club founder Margival Mendes Leal was Atlético Mineiro's first president in 1908. Nelson Campos is Atlético's longest-serving president, with a total of nine years in the office in three terms. Alexandre Kalil is the president under whom the club has won the most official trophies, with six. Sérgio Coelho is the club's president since 2021.

== Presidents ==
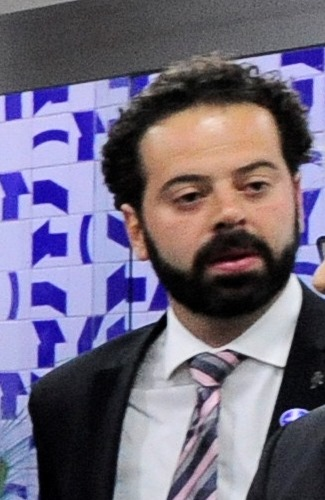
Daniel Nepomuceno served as Atlético Mineiro president between 2014 and 2017.

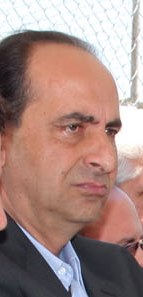
Alexandre Kalil, son of former club president Elias Kalil, served as Atlético Mineiro president between 2008 and 2014.

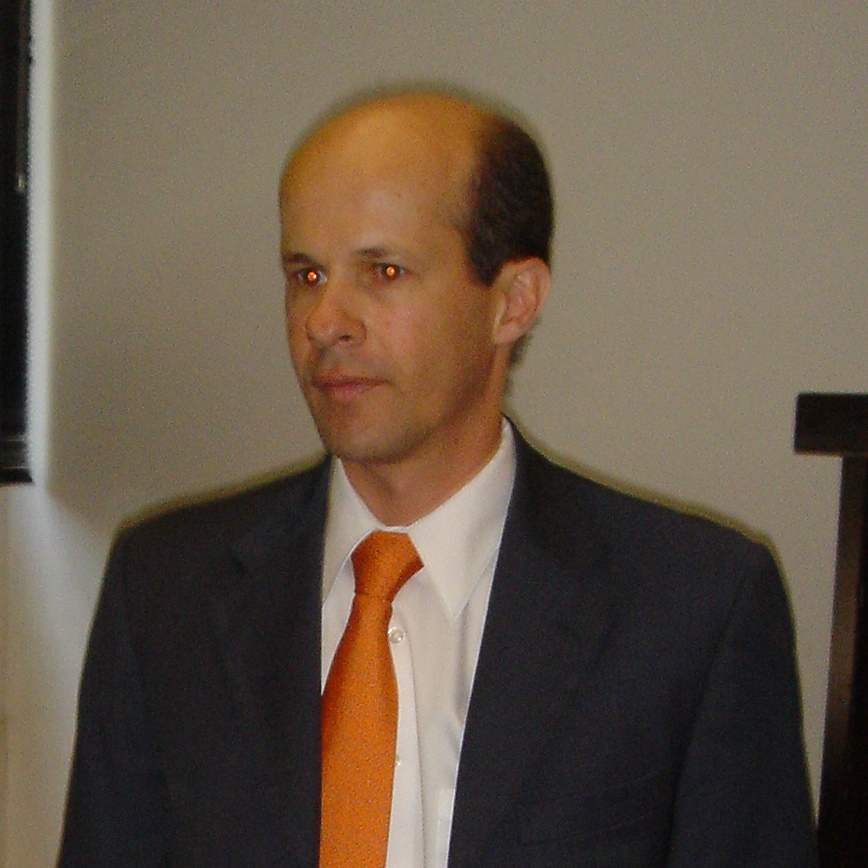
Ricardo Annes Guimarães was club president between 2001 and 2006.

Below is the official presidential history of Clube Atlético Mineiro, starting from club-founder Margival Mendes Leal in 1908.
Italics denote an acting president.

No.	Name	From	To	Club honours
1	Margival Mendes Leal	1908	1910	
2	Aleixanor Alves Pereira	1911	1911	
3	Jair Pinto dos Reis	1912	1913	
4	João Luís Moretzsohn	1914	1914	
5	Roberto Xavier Azevedo	1915	1916	1 Campeonato Mineiro
6	Nilo Rosemburg	1917	1918	
7	Jorge Dias Pena	1918	1918	
8	Antônio Antunes	1919	1919	
9	Álvaro Felicíssimo Xavier	1919	1920	
10	Alfredo Furtado	1921	1922	
–	Roberto Xavier Azevedo	1923	1923	
–	Alfredo Furtado	1924	1925	
11	Leandro Castilho de Moura Costa	1926	1930	2 Campeonato Mineiro
12	Anibal Matos	1931	1931	1 Campeonato Mineiro
13	Afonso Ferreira Paulino	1932	1932	1 Campeonato Mineiro
14	Thomaz Naves	1933	1938	2 Campeonato Mineiro, 1 Copa dos Campeões Estaduais
15	Casildo Quintino dos Santos	1939	1939	1 Campeonato Mineiro
16	Sálvio Noronha	1940	1940	
17	Hélio Soares de Moura	1940	1941	
18	Olímpyo Mourão de Miranda	1941	1942	2 Campeonato Mineiro
19	Alberto Pinheiro	1943	1944	
20	Edward Nogueira	1945	1945	
21	Gregoriano Canedo	1946	1949	2 Campeonato Mineiro
22	Geraldo Vasconcelos	1949	1949	
23	Osvaldo Silva	1949	1949	1 Campeonato Mineiro
24	José Cabral	1950	1951	1 Campeonato Mineiro
25	José Francisco de Paula Júnior	1952	1953	2 Campeonato Mineiro
26	Mário de Andrade Gomes	1954	1955	2 Campeonato Mineiro
–	José Francisco de Paula Júnior	1956	1957	1 Campeonato Mineiro
27	Nelson Campos	1958	1959	1 Campeonato Mineiro
28	Antônio Álvares da Silva	1960	1960	
29	Edgard Neves	1961	1961	
30	Fábio Fonseca e Silva	1962	1963	2 Campeonato Mineiro
31	José Ramos Filho	1964	1964	
32	Lauro Pires de Carvalho	1964	1965	
33	Eduardo Catão Magalhães Pinto	1966	1967	
–	Fábio Fonseca e Silva	1967	1967	
34	Carlos Alberto de Vasconcelos Naves	1968	1969	
–	Nelson Campos	1970	1973	1 Campeonato Brasileiro Série A, 1 Campeonato Mineiro
35	Rubens Silveira	1973	1973	
36	Walmir Pereira da Silva	1974	1979	3 Campeonato Mineiro, 1 Copa dos Campeões Brasileiros
37	Elias Kalil	1980	1985	5 Campeonato Mineiro
38	Marum Patrus de Souza	1986	1986	
–	Nelson Campos	1986	1988	2 Campeonato Mineiro
39	Afonso Araújo Paulino	1989	1994	2 Campeonato Mineiro, 1 Copa CONMEBOL
40	Paulo Cury	1995	1998	1 Copa CONMEBOL, 1 Campeonato Mineiro
41	Nélio Brant	1999	2001	1 Campeonato Mineiro
42	Ricardo Annes Guimarães	2001	2006	1 Campeonato Brasileiro Série B
43	Luís Otávio Ziza Valadares	2007	2008	1 Campeonato Mineiro
44	Alexandre Kalil	2008	2014	3 Campeonato Mineiro, 1 Copa Libertadores, 1 Recopa Sudamericana, 1 Copa do Brasil
45	Daniel Nepomuceno	2014	2017	2 Campeonato Mineiro
46	Sérgio Sette Câmara	2017	2020	1 Campeonato Mineiro
47	Sérgio Coelho	2021	Present	1 Campeonato Brasileiro Série A, 4 Campeonato Mineiro, 1 Copa do Brasil, 1 Supercopa do Brasil
