= Athletes of Christ =

Brazilian Christian sport organization

The Athletes of Christ (Portuguese: Atletas de Cristo) is a Brazilian "association of evangelical Christian sportspeople" which includes "some of the most influential people in Brazilian football among its membership". It was started by F1 driver Alex Dias Ribeiro with an initial meeting of four people, before growing to 7,000 members across 60 countries. João Leite was one of the precursors of the Atletas de Cristo ("Christ's Athletes") movement, and he used to give bibles to the opposing players, becoming known as Goleiro de Deus ("God's Goalkeeper"). In 1984, it was popularised by footballer Baltazar, who was nicknamed "God's Striker" due to his faith. In the 1980s and 1990s it was "one of the most influential power groups in Brazilian football". The Brazil national football team was banned in 2018 by the Brazilian Football Confederation from undertaking religious celebrations. Academics have noted the strong relationship between football and religion in Brazil.
