= Alfredo Bernardino =

Brazilian footballer (1912–1977)

Personal information
- Date of birth: 10 January 1912
- Place of birth: Rio de Janeiro, Brazil
- Date of death: 1977
- Position: Midfielder

Senior career*
Years	Team	Apps	(Gls)
1933–1936	Villa Nova		
1937	Atlético Mineiro		
1937–1941	Vasco da Gama		
- * Club domestic league appearances and goals

Alfredo Bernardino (10 January 1912 – 1977) was a Brazilian professional footballer who played as a midfielder.

== Career ==
A highly mobile midfielder, Alfredo Bernardino was the highlight of Villa Nova, which won the state championship on four occasions in the 1930s, being the top scorer in the 1934 edition. In 1937, at Atlético Mineiro, he was part of the winning squad of the state champions tournament in 1937, and ended his career playing for Vasco da Gama until 1941.

== Honours ==
Villa Nova

- Campeonato Mineiro: 1933, 1934, 1935

Atlético Mineiro

- Copa dos Campeões Estaduais: 1937

Vasco da Gama

- Torneio Luiz Aranha: 1940
