= Florindo (footballer) =

Brazilian footballer (1914–1996)

Personal information
- Full name: Florindo Alves Ferreira
- Date of birth: 21 April 1914
- Place of birth: Juiz de Fora, Minas Gerais, Brazil
- Date of death: 11 August 1996 (aged 82)
- Place of death: Caeté, Minas Gerais, Brazil
- Position: Defender

Youth career
- Tupynambás

Senior career*
Years	Team	Apps	(Gls)
1934–1935	Tupynambás		
1936–1937	Atlético Mineiro	56	(2)
1938–1942	Vasco da Gama	176	(4)
1942–1945	São Paulo	66	(1)
1946–1947	São Cristóvão		

International career
1939–1940	Brazil	6	(0)
- * Club domestic league appearances and goals

Florindo Alves Ferreira (21 April 1914 – 11 August 1996) was a Brazilian professional footballer who played as a defender.

== Club career ==
Florindo played for Atlético Mineiro, being state champion in 1936 and champion of the Champions Cup in 1937. He also played for Vasco da Gama and São Paulo, where he made 66 appearances and was champion in 1943. He retired at age 33 in 1947 at São Cristóvão.

== International career ==
Florindo played six matches for the Brazil national team between 1939 and 1940.

== Honours ==
Tupynambás

- Campeonato Citadino de Juiz de Fora: 1934

Atlético Mineiro

- Campeonato Mineiro: 1936
- Copa dos Campeões Estaduais: 1937

Seleção Carioca

- Campeonato Brasileiro de Seleções Estaduais: 1938, 1939

Vasco da Gama

- Torneio Luiz Aranha: 1940
- Torneio Início: 1942
- Troféu da Paz: 1942

São Paulo

- Campeonato Paulista: 1943
- Taça dos Campeões Estaduais Rio-São Paulo: 1943
- Taça Cidade de São Paulo: 1944
