= Estádio Presidente Antônio Carlos =

Stadium in Belo Horizonte, Brazil

- Estádio de Lourdes, Estadinho da Colina
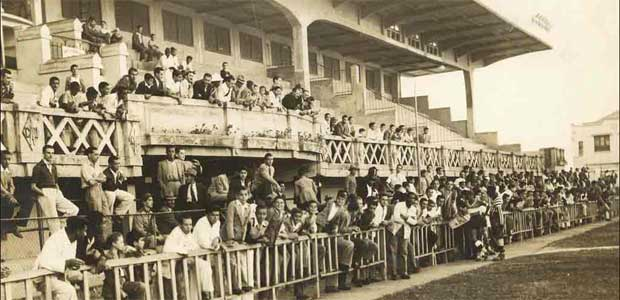
- Interactive map of Estádio Presidente Antônio Carlos
- Location: Belo Horizonte, Brazil
- Coordinates: 19°55′41″S 43°56′50″W
- Owner: Atlético Mineiro
- Capacity: c. 5,000
- Surface: Grass

Construction
- Groundbreaking: 1928
- Opened: 1929
- Closed: 1969
- Demolished: 1994

Tenant
- Atlético Mineiro (1929–1950)

The Estádio Presidente Antônio Carlos, commonly known as Estádio de Lourdes and colloquially as Estadinho da Colina ("Hill's Small Stadium"), was a stadium located in Belo Horizonte, Brazil, owned by Atlético Mineiro. The ground, opened in the Lourdes neighborhood on 30 May 1929, had an estimated capacity of 5,000 and was Atlético's home until 1950. It remained largely unused by the first squad until its demolition in 1994, when a shopping mall was built on the site.

== History ==
In its early days, Atlético Mineiro first played its matches at the Municipal Park of Belo Horizonte, before moving in 1909 to a ground at Guajajaras Street, in downtown Belo Horizonte. Atlético eventually received from the Belo Horizonte municipal government a property at Paraopeba Avenue (later Augusto de Lima Avenue), in which it built its first official home ground. Rival club América had its first stadium across the street.

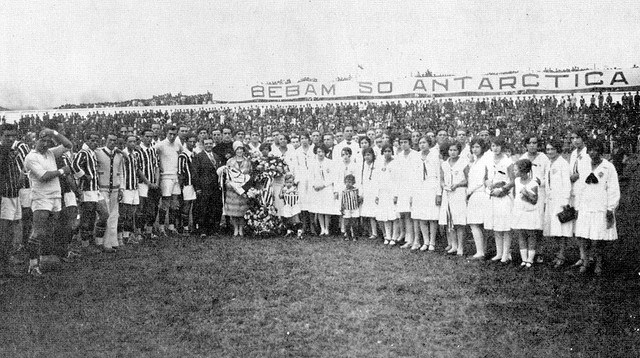
Stadium opening in 1929

In 1925 Atlético Mineiro reached an agreement with the municipality of Belo Horizonte to exchange the ground where its former stadium was located, at Paraopeba Avenue, to a new land in the Lourdes bairro. Three years later construction began, helped by state governor Antônio Carlos Ribeiro de Andrada, and the stadium opened on 30 May 30, 1929, in a friendly against Corinthians won by Atlético 4–2. The following year, the stadium was visited by then FIFA president Jules Rimet, who for the first time watched a night game, a 10–2 victory by Atlético over Sport which marked the inauguration of the ground's floodlights. The stadium was responsible for a rise in the population and people circulation of the neighborhood.

In the Antônio Carlos, Atlético Mineiro won its first competition at national level, the 1937 Copa dos Campeões Estaduais, after defeating Espírito Santo's Rio Branco 5–1. The stadium was Atlético's home from 1929 to 1950, when the larger Independência was built in Belo Horizonte to host matches of the 1950 FIFA World Cup, and the older and smaller stadium fell out of favor, the stands being used as youth academies sleeping quarters. The ground was sold to the Belo Horizonte municipality by the club in the 1960s to placate a financial crisis, and closed in 1969. After decades of legal disputes, property of the estate eventually returned to Atlético Mineiro in 1991, which then leased it to a shopping mall, built on the site where the stadium once was and inaugurated in 1996.
