= Viana (footballer) =

Brazilian footballer (born 1956)

Personal information
- Full name: José Roberto Viana dos Santos
- Date of birth: 4 May 1956 (age 70)
- Place of birth: São Paulo, Brazil
- Position: Midfielder

Youth career
- 1970–1975: São Paulo

Senior career*
Years	Team	Apps	(Gls)
1975–1980	São Paulo	116	(4)
1976–1977	→ Botafogo-PB (loan)		
1982	Comercial-MS		
1982	Goiás		
1983	Comercial-MS		
1985	São Bento		

Managerial career
- 1996–1999: Fujieda Meisei High School
- 2000: Comercial-MS
- 2001–2002: CENE
- 2005: Moreninhas-MS
- 2008: Paulistano (São Roque)
- * Club domestic league appearances and goals

José Roberto Viana dos Santos (born 4 May 1956), simply known as Viana, is a Brazilian former professional footballer and manager who played as a midfielder.

== Playing career ==
Since he had a baby tooth in São Paulo's youth categories, Viana was a multi-champion, being part of the Brazilian champion squad in 1977 and the state champion squad in 1980. Loaned to Botafogo de Paraíba in 1976, he also won the Paraíba state title. He also had successful spells at Comercial-MS and São Bento.

== Managerial career ==
Viana went to Japan to work as a technical assistant, and for 4 years coached the Fujieda Meisei High School team in Shizuoka. Returned to Brazil to coach Comercial-MS during the Copa João Havelange Group Green and White, and later became the first champion coach with CENE. He also worked at FFMS and later trained AA Moreninhas and Paulistano de São Roque. He currently owns a football school in the city of Campo Grande.

== Honours ==
=== Player ===
São Paulo

- Campeonato Brasileiro: 1977
- Campeonato Paulista: 1980

Botafogo-PB

- Campeonato Paraibano: 1976

Comercial-MS

- Campeonato Sul-Mato-Grossense: 1982

São Bento

- Copa 50 anos da FPF: 1985

=== Manager ===
CENE

- Campeonato Sul-Mato-Grossense: 2002
