= Guará (footballer, born 1916) =

Brazilian footballer

Personal information
- Full name: Guaracy Januzzi
- Date of birth: 4 January 1916
- Place of birth: Ubá, Brazil
- Date of death: 19 November 1978 (aged 62)
- Place of death: Belo Horizonte, Brazil
- Position: Forward

Youth career
- Aymorés

Senior career*
Years	Team	Apps	(Gls)
1933–1941	Atlético Mineiro	200	(168)
- * Club domestic league appearances and goals as of 21 February 2024

Guaracy Januzzi (4 January 1916 – 19 November 1978), better known as Guará, was a Brazilian professional footballer who played as a forward.

== Career ==
Nicknamed "Diabo Loiro" (Blondie Devil), Guará began his career at his hometown club, Aymorés. As a youth, he was brought to Atlético Mineiro, a club where he made 200 appearances and scored 168 goals, becoming state champion three times, the FBF Champions Cup, being top scorer on two occasions. In 1939 he almost died on the field after colliding head to head with Caieiras, suffering head trauma and spending 23 days in a coma. After retiring, he worked in the lotteries.

== Honours ==
Atlético Mineiro

- Campeonato Mineiro: 1936, 1938, 1939
- Copa dos Campeões Estaduais: 1937

Individual

- 1936 Campeonato Mineiro top scorer: 22 goals
- 1938 Campeonato Mineiro top scorer: 18 goals
