= Mineirão =

Football stadium in the state of Minas Gerais, Brazil

Governor Magalhães Pinto Stadium
- Estádio Governador Magalhães Pinto
- Mineirão (Big Mineiro)
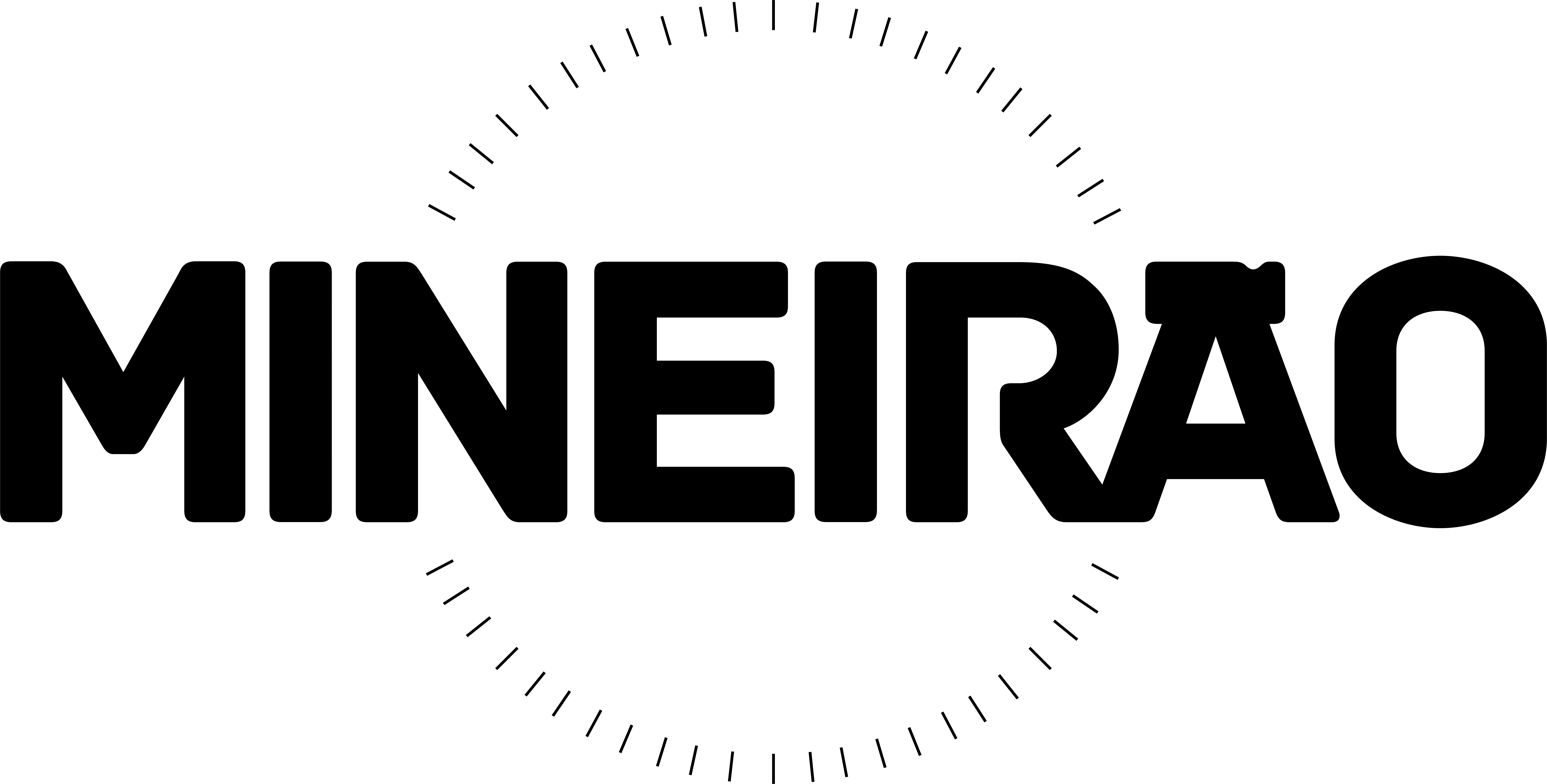

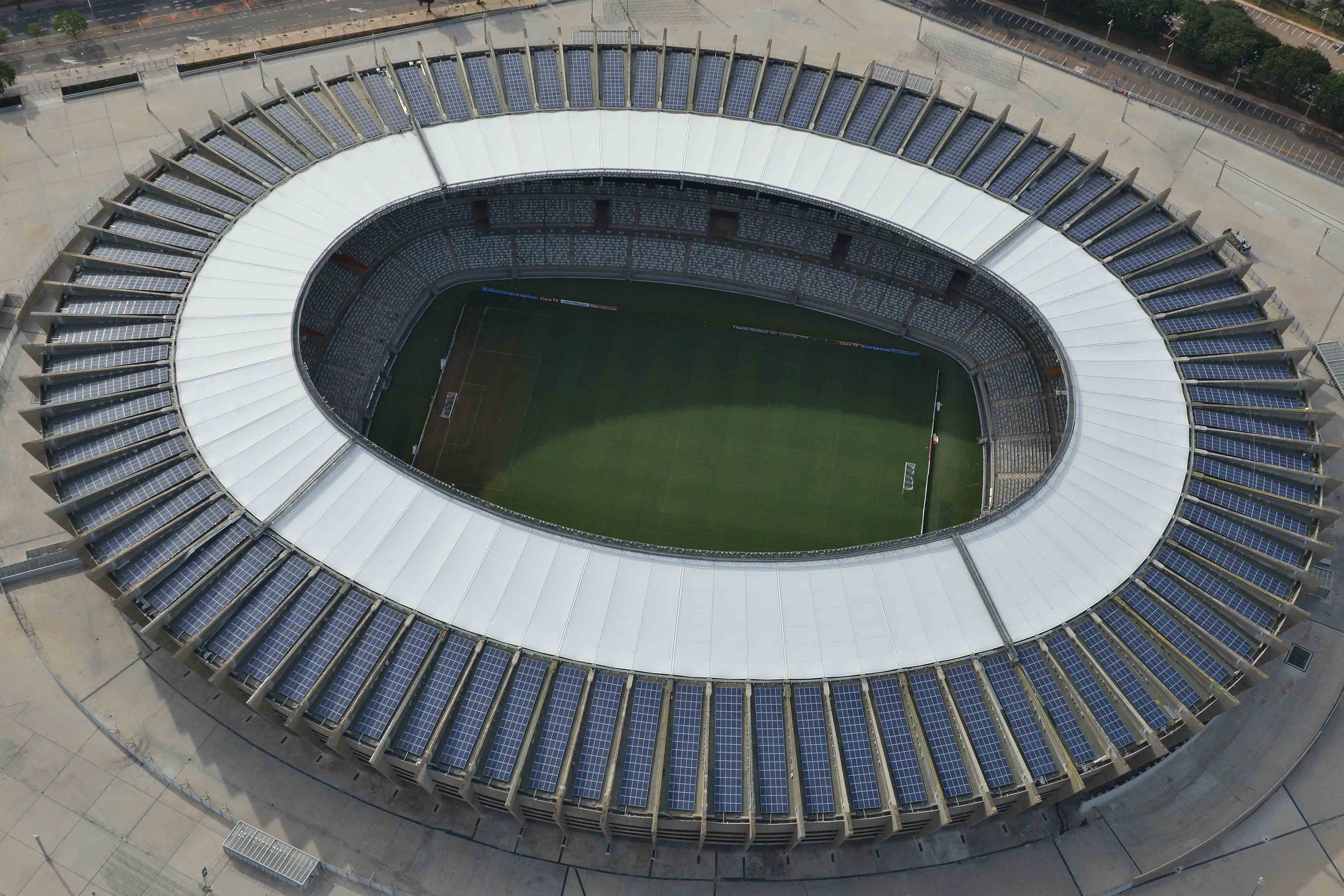
- Sisbrace
- Interactive map of Governor Magalhães Pinto Stadium
- Full name: Estádio Governador Magalhães Pinto
- Location: Belo Horizonte, Minas Gerais, Brazil
- Coordinates: 19°51′57″S 43°58′15″W
- Owner: State of Minas Gerais
- Operator: Minas Arena
- Capacity: 66,658
- Executive suites: 98
- Surface: Grass
- Record attendance: 132,834
- Field size: 105 m × 68 m (344 ft × 223 ft)

Construction
- Groundbreaking: 1959
- Built: 1960–1965
- Opened: September 5, 1965
- Renovated: 2011–2013

Tenants
- Cruzeiro (1965–present); Atlético Mineiro (1965–2023); Brazil national football team (selected matches)

Website
- estadiomineirao.com.br

Mineirão (Portuguese pronunciation: [minejˈɾɐ̃w̃]; lit. 'Big Mineiro', named after its large structure), officially known as Governor Magalhães Pinto Stadium (Portuguese: Estádio Governador Magalhães Pinto, pronounced [isˈtadʒiu ɡoveɾnaˈdoɾ maɡaˈʎɐ̃jz ˈpĩtu]; lit. 'Governor Magalhães Pinto Stadium', named after Magalhães Pinto), is an association football stadium in Belo Horizonte, Brazil. Owned by the state of Minas Gerais, it is used by Cruzeiro Esporte Clube.

It served as a venue in the 2013 FIFA Confederations Cup and the 2014 FIFA World Cup. It also hosted some matches of the football tournament of the 2016 Summer Olympics. The stadium has a seating capacity of 66,658 spectators.

== History ==
=== Background ===
The project to construct the Mineirão predated the stadium's opening by more than 25 years. In the 1940s, a modest movement began, involving managers, entrepreneurs, athletes and journalists. The idea was to build a field in Belo Horizonte to that matched the evolution of Minas Gerais' football up to that point.

The top three teams in the state capital had their stadiums, but they were cramped and uncomfortable, and no longer supported the demand of fans. Stadium Otacílio Negrão de Lima (Alameda Stadium, at Francisco Sales Avenue), of América; Antônio Carlos Stadium (located on Olegário Maciel Avenue), of Atlético Mineiro; and Juscelino Kubitschek Stadium (located on Augusto de Lima Avenue), of Cruzeiro did not support more than 10,000 spectators. Atlético, the team with the wealthiest members in Belo Horizonte, planned to build a stadium for 30,000 people, after the winning the 1937 State Champions Cup. It nearly became a reality, but then they found a huge club debt, forcing the directors to allot and sell the properties that the club had in the neighborhood where the stadium would be built, Antônio Carlos Avenue, near the airport.

At the end of the 1940s, journalist Canor Simões Coelho achieved with CBD the inclusion of Belo Horizonte as one of the venues of 1950 FIFA World Cup. For this, the council would have to build a stadium at the height of the event. Official agreement was signed by mayor Otacílio Negrão de Lima and the president of the CBD, Rivadávia Correa Meyer. The modest club Sete de Setembro was in charge of commanding the works of the new field.

The construction of Independência Stadium was slow and it seemed that would not be completed in time for the World Cup. But with the intervention of the CBD and FIFA, the city of Belo Horizonte took charge of construction, and the stage was handed over in time for the match between Yugoslavia and Switzerland on June 25, 1950, even with improvisations. But soon the initial excitement for the new stadium was falling apart, since the 30,000 seats available did not meet the growing number of fans. Independência was uncomfortable for the audience, and did not offer good conditions for the press.

The early 1950s saw the first steps supporting the construction of a larger stadium in Belo Horizonte. Under the leadership of Gil César Moreira de Abreu, a group of students from the School of Engineering of Universidade Federal de Minas Gerais (UFMG) proposed the construction of a University Stadium, to be located in the city's Pampulha region, where the university owned land. In 1956 the chairman of Federação Mineira de Futebol, Francisco de Castro Cortes proposed the construction of a Municipal Stadium on a location adjacent to the BR-040 highway, close to where BH Shopping mall stands today. The proposal asked for funds to be obtained through the sales of perpetual seating rights ('cadeiras cativas'). With the support of the President, former Minas Gerais Governor Juscelino Kubitschek, Cortes even arranged for engineers involved in the construction of Maracanã to come to Belo Horizonte and review the project.

At the time, Antonio Abrahão Caram was President of the Regional Sports Council (Conselho Regional de Desportos) in Minas Gerais, and became one of the strongest supporters of what was destined to become Mineirão. Abrahão Caram demonstrated impractical aspects of the project supported by Cortes, which was eventually abandoned in favor of a new project for the current stadium. The new project was prepared under the auspices of a team led by Benedicto Adami de Carvalho. In recognition of Abrahão Caram's role in proposing a feasible financial arrangement, selecting the venue, and assistance in drafting a State Assembly bill paving the way for the construction of Mineirão, in 1966 his name was officially designated to the avenue where the stadium is located, Avenida Antônio Abrahão Caram.

Once the design started to become a reality, then State Representative Jorge Carone Filho was assigned the mission of drafting the State Assembly bill that would help turn Mineirão a reality. The idea was to obtain funding through the State Lottery (Loteria Mineira) whose tickets would carry a 10% earmark toward a stadium building fund. "Estádio Minas Gerais" was then created under State Bill 1947 dated August 12, 1959, which was signed into Law by Governor José Francisco Bias Fortes. The law also provided for the creation of AEMG, an administrative tasked with managing the finished stadium. AEMG would later become ADEMG (Administração de Estádios do Estado de Minas Gerais).

Modifications to the original University Stadium were left to architects Eduardo Mendes Guimarães and Gaspar Garreto, which the goal of upgrading it from a 30,000 visitors venue into a new "giant" stadium capable of accommodating up to 100,000 visitors. The chosen site was located in the Pampulha region, in land owned by UFMG, whose President Pedro Paulo Penido was favorable to the project while expecting construction of Mineirão at the site of UFMG's new campus would attract an influx of people into this sparsely populated area. With the approval of President Kubitschek's Education Minister Clóvis Salgado, an agreement between UFMG and AEMG was signed on February 25, 1960, when the Brazilian federal government and the Federal University of Minas Gerais gave Minas Gerais land in the neighborhood of Pampulha, Belo Horizonte, for the construction of the stadium.

=== Construction ===
When work on the stadium began in 1959, its completion was far from certain. Gil César Moreira de Abreu, the construction manager, faced repeated financial crises and used political negotiation to keep the project alive. Spending was tightly controlled, but the work ran short of money at nearly every stage. The initial loan of ₢$100 million was consumed during the first foundation works. For a year and a half, construction moved slowly, with limited equipment and a reduced workforce. While one group worked to change laws that would allow new funding and to persuade Governor Magalhães Pinto to finance the stadium, AEMG tried to adapt the project to its fragile financial situation.

Mineirão was designed by the architects Eduardo Mendes Guimarães Júnior and Caspar Garreto. The structural design was prepared by the engineer Arthur Eugênio Jermann, and the construction work was directed by Gil César Moreira de Abreu. From 1963 until the inauguration on 5 September 1965, about 5,000 people worked on the project.

The new stadium became a point of reference for Brazilian engineering, with several construction techniques then considered advanced in the country. The Mineirão engineering team studied Maracanã in detail, looking for structural weaknesses that should not be repeated in Belo Horizonte. In 1964, Gil César travelled to Tokyo, where arenas were being built for the 1964 Summer Olympics, to observe new ideas in stadium construction. The team also paid close attention to the quality of the pitch, including markings and other small details.

One of the main challenges was the construction of the superstructure, a pseudo-ellipse with a major axis of 275 m (902 ft) and a minor axis of 217 m (712 ft), using conventional equipment. To test the design and reduce uncertainty, the builders created a "mini-Mineirão", known as experimental sector 15, where a section of the stands and roof was subjected to different kinds of tests. Concrete plants, conveyor belts, graders, loaders and shuttles were also tested. The work required steel bars in lengths that local industry could not supply. The solution came on the construction site itself, where engineers and workers welded bars together to produce the required lengths.

With more money, the project could have hired a larger workforce, but AEMG also faced a shortage of qualified labor. A public tender for labor supply proved unworkable: the price demanded, ₢$15 million, was far beyond the administration's budget for the new stadium. It was later argued that the amount requested by the companies would have been enough to build one and a half Mineirões. In the final accounting, the "Gigante da Pampulha" ("Pampulha Giant") cost about US$10 million. Because skilled workers were scarce, AEMG organized training for masons, carpenters, rebar workers and other trades. Entire classes were formed, and hundreds of workers were trained for specialized tasks. At that stage, the administration gathered the workforce needed to move the project forward at a faster pace. Between August 1964 and July 1965, construction advanced from the experimental sector to the country's most modern stadium.

To speed up construction and reduce the pressure of the budget crisis, Gil César introduced a 24-hour work schedule, divided into three shifts with 3,000 workers. Work did not stop. From the top of Edifício Acaiaca in downtown Belo Horizonte, the glow of the construction lights could be seen around the future Mineirão. The administration began rewarding teams for productivity and inventiveness, encouraging competition between different parts of the site. This "little game" among the work fronts was successful, and several sections were finished ahead of schedule. The round-the-clock schedule allowed the stadium to be delivered to the public in eight months. Even with the pace and pressure of the work, only one worker died during the construction of the arena.

The opening festivities included parachute jumpers, music and an inaugural football match. The events were attended by 73,201 people. The first match at Mineirão was played between the Minas Gerais state team and the Argentine club River Plate.

== Important matches ==
The record attendance of the stadium was 132,834 people in 1997 in Campeonato Mineiro final match between Cruzeiro and Villa Nova. The paying attendance was 74,857, and there were 56,618 women and children who entered for free. For safety reasons, the capacity of Mineirão has been reduced for the majority of its 40-year history. In 2004, by imposition of FIFA, the capacity of the stadium was reduced to 72,000 people.

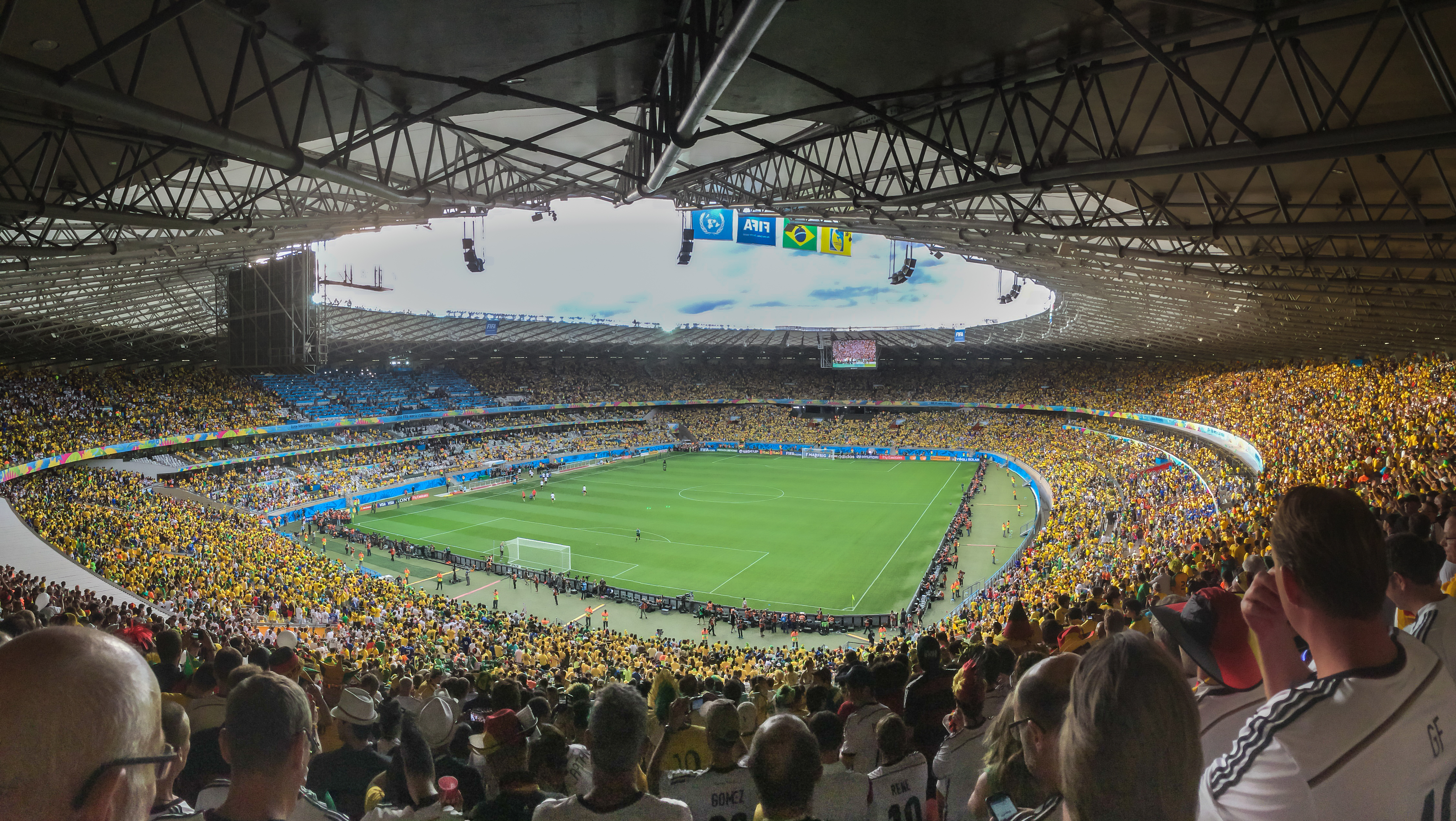
The stadium during the 2014 FIFA World Cup

Since the stadium opening, the three most important teams in Belo Horizonte have hosted their matches in Mineirão: Cruzeiro (always), Atlético Mineiro and América. Mineirão has hosted also at least one match of the Brazil national team in every FIFA World Cup qualifications, and matches of the 2013 FIFA Confederations Cup, the 2014 FIFA World Cup and men/women football matches of Olympic Games 2016.

Important matches and trophies won by local teams on Mineirão's pitch include:

- First match: Friendly – September 5, 1965 – Minas Gerais state team 1–0 River Plate. Attendance: 73,201.
- First international match: Friendly – September 7, 1965 – Brazil 3–0 Uruguay (Brazil was represented by Palmeiras.)
- First Clássico Mineiro: Campeonato Mineiro – October 24, 1965 – Cruzeiro 1–0 Atlético Mineiro
- First national final in Minas Gerais: 1966 Taça Brasil – November 30, 1966 – Cruzeiro 6–2 Santos
- First international final in Minas Gerais: 1976 Copa Libertadores – July 21, 1976 – Cruzeiro 4–1 River Plate
- Intercontinental Cup: December 21, 1976 – Cruzeiro 0–0 Bayern Munich
- Supercopa Libertadores: November 20, 1991 – Cruzeiro 3–0 River Plate
- Copa do Brasil – 1993, 2000, 2003, 2017 (Cruzeiro), 2014 (Atlético Mineiro)
- Copa Libertadores – 1997 (Cruzeiro), 2013 (Atlético Mineiro)
- Copa CONMEBOL – 1997 (Atlético)
- Recopa Sudamericana – 2014 (Atlético Mineiro)
- Brazil's 1–7 thrashing by Germany in the 2014 World Cup semi-finals,

The stadium's top scorer is Reinaldo, who played for Atlético from 1973 to 1984 and swung the nets 144 times. On the other hand, Cruzeiro's Tostão played from 1965 to 1972, scored 143 goals and had the best yearly average (17 goals).

=== Historical goals scored in Mineirão ===
- First goal: Buglê, from Minas Gerais state team on September 5, 1965
- 1000th: Lola, from Atlético Mineiro, on April 6, 1968
- 5000th: Paulinho, from Villa Nova, on March 10, 1985
- Germany national team's 2000th goal (by Thomas Müller) and Miroslav Klose's 16 FIFA World Cup goal (set the record for most World Cup goals scored by a player before it was broken in the 2026 tournament), both taking place on July 8, 2014

=== 2013 FIFA Confederations Cup ===
Date	Time (UTC-03)	Team #1	Result	Team #2	Round	Attendance
17 June 2013	16:00	Tahiti	1–6	Nigeria	Group B	20,187
22 June 2013	16:00	Japan	1–2	Mexico	Group A	52,690
26 June 2013	16:00	Brazil	2–1	Uruguay	Semi-finals	57,483

=== 2014 FIFA World Cup ===
Date	Time (UTC-03)	Team #1	Result	Team #2	Round	Attendance
14 June 2014	13:00	Colombia	3–0	Greece	Group C	57,174
17 June 2014	13:00	Belgium	2–1	Algeria	Group H	56,800
21 June 2014	13:00	Argentina	1–0	Iran	Group F	57,698
24 June 2014	13:00	Costa Rica	0–0	England	Group D	57,823
28 June 2014	13:00	Brazil	1–1 (a.e.t.) (3–2 pen.)	Chile	Round of 16	57,714
8 July 2014	17:00	Brazil	1–7	Germany	Semi-finals	58,141

=== 2016 Summer Olympics – Women's Football ===
Date	Time (UTC-03)	Team #1	Res.	Team #2	Round	Attendance
3 August 2016	19:00	United States	2–0	New Zealand	Group G	10,059
3 August 2016	22:00	France	4–0	Colombia	Group G	6,847
6 August 2016	17:00	United States	1–0	France	Group G	11,782
6 August 2016	20:00	Colombia	0–1	New Zealand	Group G	8,505
12 August 2016	22:00	Brazil	0–0 (a.e.t.) (7–6 pen.)	Australia	Quarter-finals	52,660

=== 2016 Summer Olympics – Men's Football ===
Date	Time (UTC-03)	Team #1	Result	Team #2	Round	Attendance
10 August 2016	13:00	Algeria	1–1	Portugal	Group D	13,787
10 August 2016	16:00	Germany	10–0	Fiji	Group C	16,521
13 August 2016	19:00	South Korea	0–1	Honduras	Quarter-finals	36,704
20 August 2016	13:00	Honduras	2–3	Nigeria	Bronze medal match	9,091

=== 2019 Copa América ===
Date	Time (UTC-03)	Team #1	Result	Team #2	Round	Attendance
16 June 2019	19:00	Uruguay	4–0	Ecuador	Group C	13,611
19 June 2019	21:30	Argentina	1–1	Paraguay	Group B	35,265
22 June 2019	16:00	Bolivia	1–3	Venezuela	Group A	8,091
24 June 2019	20:00	Ecuador	1–1	Japan	Group C	7,623
2 July 2019	21:30	Brazil	2–0	Argentina	Semi-finals	55,947

=== 2027 FIFA Women's World Cup ===
Date	Time (UTC-03)	Team #1	Result	Team #2	Round	Attendance
26 June 2027	--:--	C1	v	C2	Group C	
28 June 2027	--:--	G3	v	G4	Group G	
30 June 2027	--:--	B1	v	B3	Group B	
2 July 2027	--:--	F1	v	F3	Group F	
5 July 2027	--:--	C3	v	C2	Group C	
7 July 2027	--:--	E2	v	E3	Group E	
11 July 2027	--:--	Winner Group B	v	Runner-up Group A	Round of 16	
16 July 2027	--:--	Winner Match 49	v	Winner Match 50	Quarter-finals	

== Concerts ==
Mineirão has been the venue to music events since its opening date:

- Kiss – Creatures of the Night Tour, June 23, 1983
- Menudo – 1985
- Diante do Trono – Preciso de Ti, July 15, 2001 (biggest audience ever at the stadium, featuring more than 210,000 people)
- RBD – September 30, 2006
- Elton John – 40th Anniversary of the Rocket Man, March 9, 2013
- Pop Rock Brasil Festival – 2001, 2005–07 (2006 edition featured The Rasmus, New Order and Black Eyed Peas)
- Axé Brasil Festival – 2005–2010, 2013
- Paul McCartney – Out There! Tour, May 4, 2013 (the tour kick off)
- Beyoncé – The Mrs. Carter Show World Tour, September 11, 2013
- Pearl Jam – Pearl Jam 2015 Latin America Tour, November 20, 2015
- Paul McCartney – One on One Tour, October 17, 2017
- Roger Waters – Us + Them Tour, October 21, 2018
- Metallica – Metallica 2021–2022 Tour, May 12, 2022
- Guns N' Roses – Guns N' Roses 2020 Tour, September 13, 2022
- Roger Waters – This Is Not a Drill, November 8, 2023
- Bruno Mars - Bruno Mars Live - November 5, 2024

After the reform, the outside "patio" also became a viable location for concerts.

- Black Sabbath – Black Sabbath Reunion Tour, October 15, 2013
- Festival Planeta Brasil (Guns N' Roses, Cypress Hill, Slightly Stoopid, Criolo, Raimundos, Roberto Frejat and Natiruts) – March 22, 2014
- Circuito Banco do Brasil 2014 (Linkin Park, Titãs, Nação Zumbi, Panic! at the Disco) – October 14, 2014
- Foo Fighters – Sonic Highways World Tour, January 28, 2015
- Los Hermanos – October 23, 2015
- Maroon 5 – Maroon V Tour – March 11, 2016
- Iron Maiden – The Book of Souls World Tour, March 19, 2016
- BH Dance Festival (featuring Alesso and Afrojack) – April 21, 2016
- Ed Sheeran – ÷ Tour, May 30, 2017
- Aerosmith – Aero-Vederci Baby! Tour, September 18, 2017
- John Mayer – The Search for Everything World Tour – October 20, 2017
- Demi Lovato – Holy Fvck Tour – September 2, 2022

== See also ==
- List of football stadiums in Brazil
- List of association football stadiums by capacity
- Lists of stadiums

== External links/images ==
- Stadium Guide Article
- FIFA Profile

Preceded by El Monumental de Nuñez; Buenos Aires	Copa Libertadores; Final Venue; 1997	Succeeded by Monumental Isidro Romero Carbo; Guayaquil
Preceded by Maracanã Stadium; Rio de Janeiro	Copa Libertadores; Final Venue; 2009	Succeeded by Estádio Beira-Rio; Porto Alegre
Preceded by Estádio do Pacaembu; São Paulo	Copa Libertadores; Final Venue; 2013	Succeeded by Estadio Pedro Bidegain; Buenos Aires
