= Reinaldo (footballer, born 1957) =

Brazilian footballer

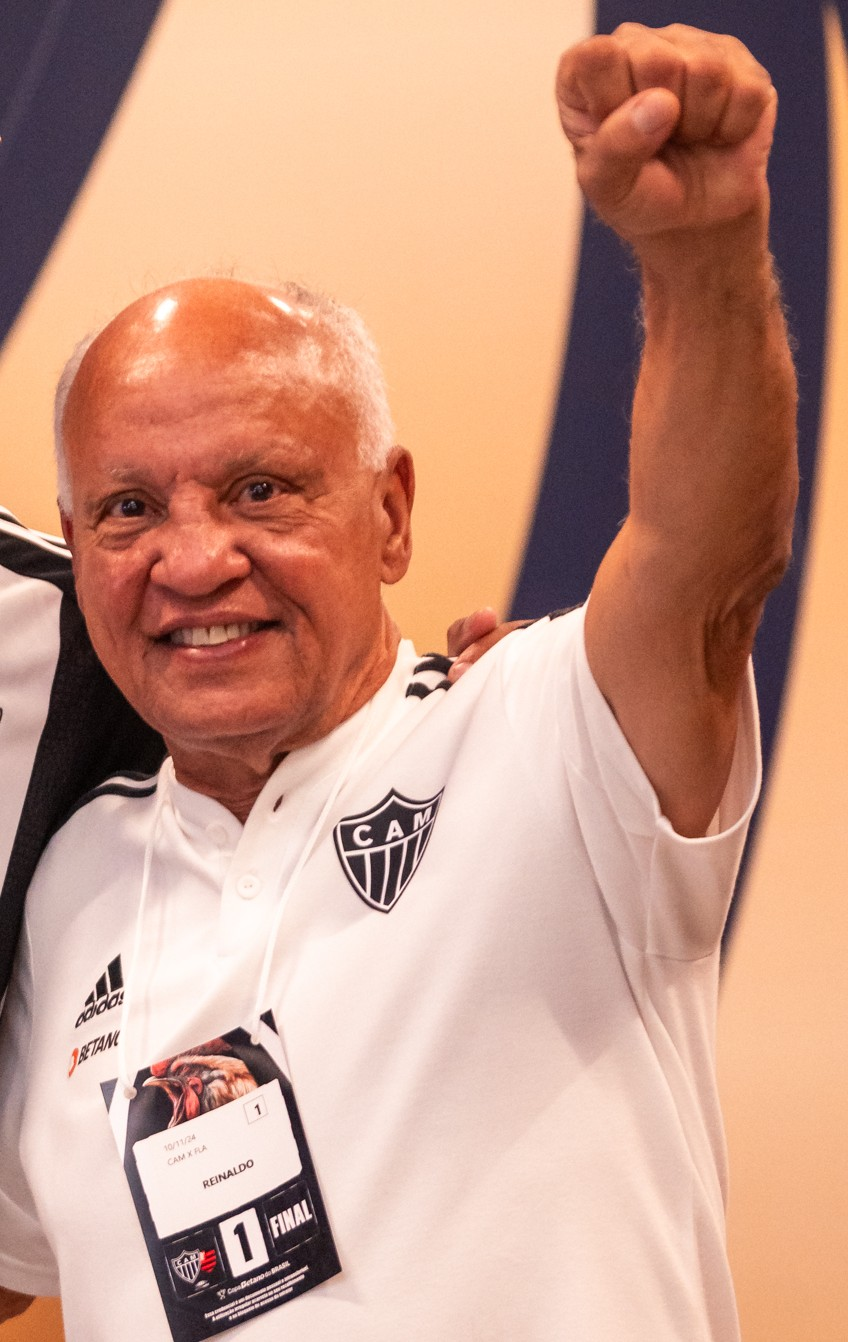

Personal information
- Full name: José Reinaldo de Lima
- Date of birth: 11 January 1957 (age 69)
- Place of birth: Ponte Nova, Brazil
- Position: Striker

Senior career*
Years	Team	Apps	(Gls)
1973–1985	Atlético Mineiro	475	(255)
1985	Palmeiras	7	(0)
1986	Rio Negro	6	(2)
1986	Cruzeiro	2	(0)
1986	Häcken		
1987	Telstar Velsen	6	(2)

International career
1975–1985	Brazil	37	(14)

Managerial career
- 1999: Valeriodoce
- 2001: Mamoré
- 2012: Villa Nova
- 2014: Ipatinga
- * Club domestic league appearances and goals

José Reinaldo de Lima (born 11 January 1957) is a Brazilian former footballer who played as a striker. He is popularly known as Reinaldo or Rei (The King). Widely regarded as one of the greatest strikers in the history of Brazilian football, Reinaldo played most of his career for Atlético Mineiro. He is considered by many as the most important player in the club's history, and still holds the record of highest average goal per game in the Brazilian league, with 1.55 goals per match in the 1977 Brazilian Championship, at a time when Atlético Mineiro was regarded to have one of the best teams in the world.

Legendary Brazilian midfielder Zico considered him the best player he had ever seen, believing he would have been the greatest Brazilian player after Pelé if not for injuries.

== Clubs and years active ==
Reinaldo played 30 matches and scored 14 goals for the Brazil national team between July 1975 and May 1985, including the 1978 FIFA World Cup, where he scored one goal against Sweden. He also scored the qualifying goal for Brazil's participation in the 1982 FIFA World Cup held in Spain, but was not included on the team, apparently due to injury.

== Records and awards ==
Reinaldo scored a club record of 255 goals for Clube Atlético Mineiro. He also averaged 1.55 goals per match in the 1977 season—scoring 28 goals in 18 matches— the record average for the Brazilian League, for which Atlético supporters nicknamed him The King ("o Rei", in Portuguese, which also served as a pun on his name). He won eight Campeonato Mineiro titles including six consecutively: in 1976, 1978–1983, and 1985.

== Subsequent career ==
Reinaldo is still remembered by Atlético Mineiro supporters. In 2004, he was elected in Belo Horizonte to represent the Partido dos Trabalhadores (Brazilian Workers' Party).

== Honours ==
Atlético Mineiro

- Copa dos Campeões da Copa Brasil: 1978
- Campeonato Mineiro: 1976, 1978, 1979, 1980, 1981, 1982, 1983, e 1985

Brazil

- Taça da França: 1981
- Taça da Inglaterra: 1981

Individual

- Campeonato Brasileiro Série A Top Scorer: 1977 (28 goals)
- Bola de Prata da Revista Placar (artilheiro do Campeonato Brasileiro - 28 gols: 1977)
- Bola de Prata da Revista Placar (seleção do Campeonato Brasileiro: 1977 e 1983)

Record

- Top scorer with the highest average of goals in a single Brazilian Championship (28 goals in 18 matches, average of 1.55 per game): 1977
