= Luiz Bazzoni =

Brazilian footballer (1914–2002)

Bazzoni
Personal information
- Full name: Luiz Bazzoni
- Date of birth: 3 September 1914
- Place of birth: Belo Horizonte, Brazil
- Date of death: 3 September 2002 (aged 88)
- Position: Forward

Senior career*
Years	Team	Apps	(Gls)
1935–1938	Atlético Mineiro	59	(28)
1938–1939	Santos		
1940–1943	São Paulo	73	(36)
1944–1945	Atlético Mineiro	16	(4)
- * Club domestic league appearances and goals as of 23 September 2023

Luiz Bazzoni (3 September 1914 – 3 September 2002), was a Brazilian professional footballer who played as a forward.

== Career ==
Born in Belo Horizonte, he began his playing career at Atlético Mineiro, a club for which he was state champion in 1936 and the Copa dos Campeões Estaduais in 1937. Bazzani moved to Santos and later to São Paulo, where he was also state champion in 1943.

== Honours ==
Atlético Mineiro

- Campeonato Mineiro: 1936
- Copa dos Campeões Estaduais: 1937

São Paulo

- Campeonato Paulista: 1943
