= João Leite (politician) =

Brazilian politician and footballer (born 1955)

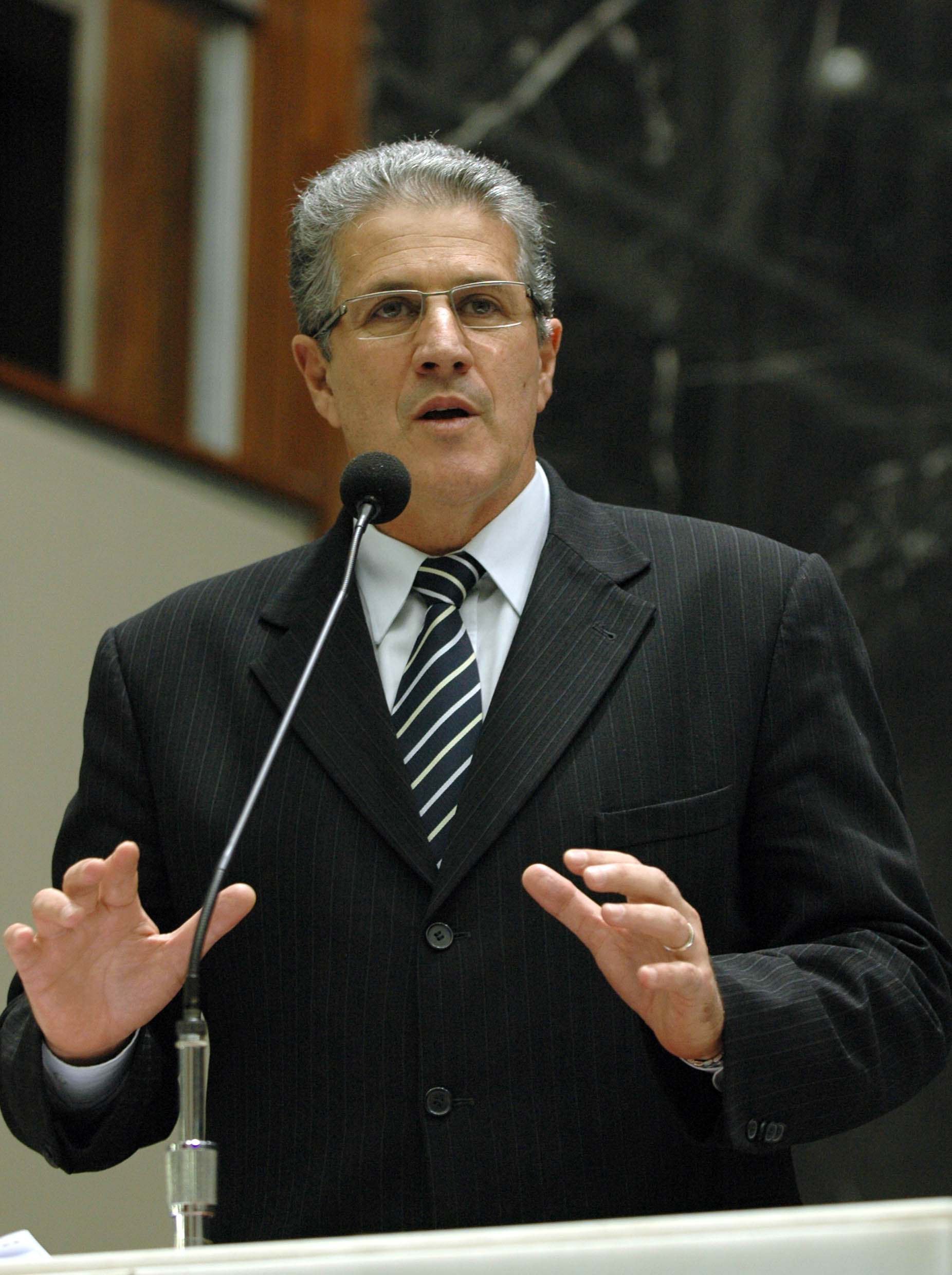

State Deputy of Minas Gerais
- Incumbent
- Assumed office 1 February 1995

City Councillor of Belo Horizonte
- In office 1 January 1993 – 16 December 1994

Personal details
- Born: João Leite da Silva Neto; 13 October 1955 (age 71) Belo Horizonte, Minas Gerais, Brazil
- Party: PSDB (2006–present; 1992–2004)
- Other political affiliations: PSB (2004–06)
- Profession: Former football player
Association football career
- Height: 1.87 m (6 ft 2 in)
- Position: Goalkeeper
Youth career
- Alvorada
- América Mineiro
- Atlético Mineiro
Senior career*
Years	Team	Apps	(Gls)
1976–1988	Atlético Mineiro		
1988–1989	Vitória de Guimarães		
1989	Guarani		
1990	América Mineiro		
1991–1992	Atlético Mineiro		
International career
1979–1982	Brazil	6	(0)
- * Club domestic league appearances and goals

João Leite da Silva Neto, known simply as João Leite (Pitangui, 13 October 1955), is a Brazilian former politician in the Legislative Assembly of Minas Gerais and a former football goalkeeper who played for Atlético Mineiro in the decades of 1970, 1980 and 1990.

== Career ==
João Leite started and spent most of his career at Clube Atlético Mineiro, for which he holds the record for most appearances and most trophies won. João Leite first played for Atlético in 1977, substituting Ortiz. He also played in the Campeonato Brasileiro, with his team finishing the championship at second place after losing to São Paulo in the finals. In the 17 years that he played for the club, João Leite played a total of 684 matches, won twelve Campeonato Mineiro and one Copa CONMEBOL.

He also played for Vitória de Guimarães, Guarani and América Mineiro, before returning to Atlético Mineiro and ending his career.

He was selected for the Brazil national team during the 1980 Mundialito and the 1979 Copa América, and played 5 official games in total with the Seleção between 1980 and 1981.

João Leite was one of the precursors of the Atletas de Cristo ("Christ's Athletes") movement, and he used to give bibles to the opposing players, becoming known as Goleiro de Deus ("God's Goalkeeper").

Nowadays João Leite is state deputy in Minas Gerais, and has been since 1995. In January 2023 he requested retirement from politics along with nine other ex-colleagues.

== Honours ==
Atlético Mineiro

- Campeonato Mineiro: 1976, 1978, 1979, 1980, 1981, 1982, 1983, 1985, 1986, 1988, 1991
- Copa CONMEBOL: 1992
- Brazilian Champions Cup: 1978

Individual

- Bola de Prata: 1979
