= Copa dos Campeões da Copa Brasil =

1978 Copa dos Campeões da Copa Brasil
Copa dos Campeões Brasileiros, Copa dos Campeões do Brasil, Torneio dos Campeões Brasileiros

Tournament details
- Country: Brazil
- Teams: 3

Final positions
- Champions: Atlético Mineiro
- Runners-up: São Paulo

Tournament statistics
- Matches played: 3
- Goals scored: 5 (1.67 per match)

The Copa dos Campeões da Copa Brasil (Copa Brasil Champions Cup) was an official football competition organized in 1978 by the Brazilian Sports Confederation (CBD), predecessor of the Brazilian Football Confederation, and contested by past winners of the Campeonato Brasileiro Série A.

The tournament was contested by past Brasileirão champions of the 1971, 1974 and 1977 editions: respectively Atlético Mineiro, Vasco da Gama and São Paulo. Palmeiras, champion in 1972 and 1973, and Guarani, champion in 1978, withdrew from the competition due to conflicting dates with the 1978 Campeonato Paulista. Internacional, champion of the 1975 and 1976 editions, was excluded by CBD because of legal disputes.

Atlético Mineiro won the competition, defeating São Paulo in the final in a penalty shootout.

== Matches ==
=== Semifinal ===
First leg

15 August 1978

Atlético Mineiro (Minas Gerais)	2–1	(Rio de Janeiro (state)) Vasco da Gama
Fernando 25' (o.g.); Danival 63'		Dirceu 21'

Mineirão, Belo Horizonte
Attendance: 16,282
Referee: (Minas Gerais) Oscar Scolfaro

Second leg

20 August 1978

Vasco da Gama (Rio de Janeiro (state))	1–1	(Minas Gerais) Atlético Mineiro
Guina 38'		Ziza 50' (pen.)

Maracanã, Rio de Janeiro
Attendance: 11,896
Referee: (São Paulo (state)) José Favilli Neto

=== Final ===
22 August 1978

Atlético Mineiro (Minas Gerais)	0 – 0	(São Paulo (state)) São Paulo
Penalties
Ziza (penalty scored); Alves (penalty scored); Toninho Cerezo (penalty scored); Marinho (penalty scored)	4–2	(penalty scored) Bezerra; (penalty missed) Chicão; (penalty missed) Zé Sérgio; (penalty scored) Viana

Mineirão, Belo Horizonte
Attendance: 19,535
Referee: (Rio de Janeiro (state)) José Roberto Wright
