= 1937 Brazilian Football Championship =

Campeonato Brasileiro Série A
- Season: 1937
- Dates: 6 January – 14 February 1937
- Champions: Atlético Mineiro (1st title)
- Matches: 14
- Goals: 68 (4.86 per match)
- Top goalscorer: Paulista (8 goals)
- Biggest home win: Fluminense 6-0 Atlético Mineiro

The 1937 Campeonato Brasileiro Série A (officially the 1937 Torneio dos Campeões) was the 1st edition of the Campeonato Brasileiro Série A. It was an official tournament organized by the now defunct Brazilian Football Federation (FBF) and aimed to point the Brazilian champion at that time. It was the second time a state champions cup happened in Brazil.

The competition brought together the 1936 champions of the state leagues of Espírito Santo, Minas Gerais, Rio de Janeiro and São Paulo, and was played in round-robin for points systems. The winning team was the Atlético Mineiro.

On 25 August 2023, the Brazilian Football Confederation (CBF) officially recognized the tournament as analogous to the Campeonato Brasileiro Série A, thus conferring to Atlético Mineiro the status of first national champions of Brazil.

== Competition ==
The 1936 tournament was organised by the Brazilian Football Federation and held in a league format ("round robin") with home and away legs. Participants were the five state champions of 1936 and a delegation of the sports club of the navy, which qualified through an internal process. Participating teams were:

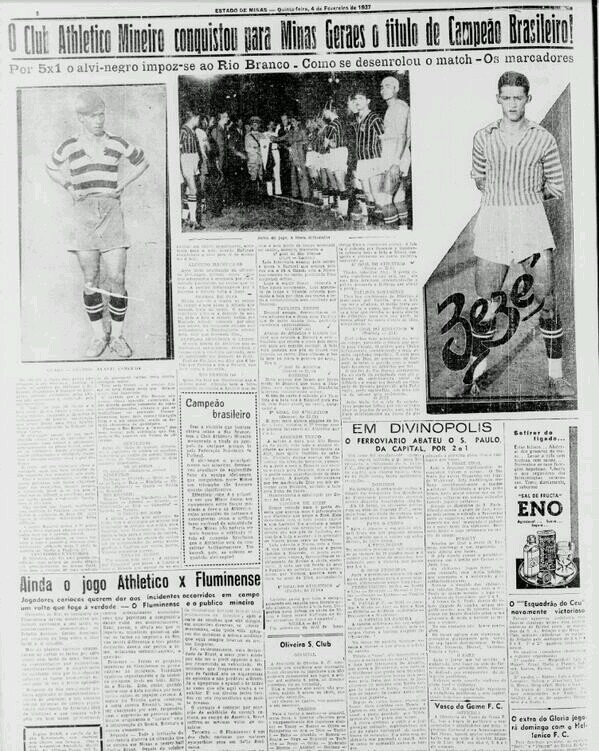
"Atlético brings Minas Gerais Brazilian champion title."Estado de Minas 3 February 1937.

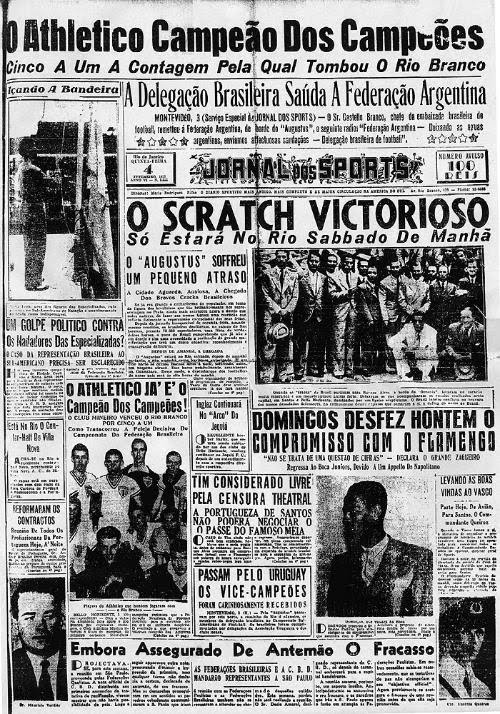
"Atlético Champion of champions."Jornal dos Sports 3 February 1937.

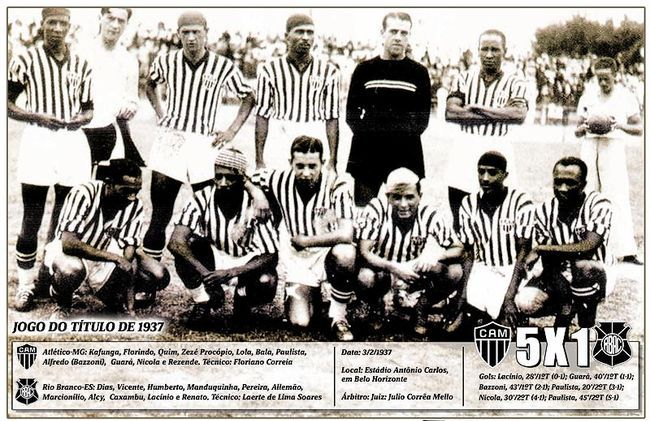
"Atlético Brazilian Champion."Gazeta Esportiva 3 February 1937.

- the State Champions of Rio de Janeiro (Federal District): Fluminense FC from Rio de Janeiro
- the State Champions of São Paulo: Associação Portuguesa de Desportos from São Paulo
- the State Champions of Minas Gerais: Clube Atlético Mineiro from Belo Horizonte
- the State Champions of Espirito Santo: Rio Branco AC from Vitória
- the State Champions of the municipality of Campos dos Goytacazes: Sport Club Alliança from Campos dos Goytacazes
- and Liga de Sports da Marinha, the sports club of the navy, coached by the renowned Nicolas Ladany, based in Rio de Janeiro

Atlético, Fluminense and Portuguesa were automatically qualified. The other participants played for one more place:

Qualification

Date	Match	Score
6 January 1937	SC Aliança – Liga de Sports da Marinha	0–2
11 January 1937	Rio Branco AC – Liga de Sports da Marinha	2–0 aet

The matches

Date	Match	Score
10 January 1937	Portuguesa – Fluminense FC	4–1
13 January 1937	Fluminense FC – Atlético Mineiro	6–0
13 January 1937	Rio Branco AC – Portuguesa	3–1
17 January 1937	Fluminense FC – Rio Branco AC	5–2
20 January 1937	Rio Branco AC – Atlético Mineiro	1–1
24 January 1937	Atlético Mineiro – Portuguesa	5:0
24 January 1937	Rio Branco AC – Fluminense FC	4–3
27 January 1937	Fluminense FC – Portuguesa	6–2
31 January 1937	Portuguesa – Rio Branco AC	4–0
31 January 1937	Atlético Mineiro – Fluminense FC	4–1
3 February 1937	Atlético Mineiro – Rio Branco AC	5–1
14 February 1937	Portuguesa – Atlético Mineiro	2–3

Final table

Pos	Team	Pld	W	D	L	GF	GA	GD	Pts	Final result
1	(Minas Gerais) Atlético-MG	6	4	1	1	18	10	+8	9	Champions
2	(Rio de Janeiro (state)) Fluminense	6	3	0	3	22	16	+6	6	
3	(Espírito Santo) Rio Branco	6	2	1	3	10	19	−9	5	
4	(São Paulo (state)) Portuguesa	6	2	0	4	13	18	−5	4	

Winner was Atlético Mineiro, with the following team: Kafunga, Clóvis – Florindo, Quim – Zezé Procópio, Lola, Bala, Alcindo – Paulista, Abraz, Alfredo Bernardino, Bazzoni, Guará, Nicola, Resende, Elair – Coach: Floriano Peixoto Corrêa. Atlético usually played in a 2–3–5 formation.
