= 1956 in Brazilian football =

Football in Brazil
- Season: 1956

The following article presents a summary of the 1956 football (soccer) season in Brazil, which was the 55th season of competitive football in the country.

== Torneio Rio-São Paulo ==
The Torneio Rio-São Paulo was not contested in 1956.

== Campeonato Paulista ==
Final Stage (Série Azul)

Position	Team	Points	Played	Won	Drawn	Lost	For	Against	Difference
1	Santos	30	18	15	0	3	43	18	25
2	São Paulo	30	18	13	4	1	56	20	36
3	Corinthians	25	18	9	7	2	41	22	19
4	Palmeiras	22	18	9	4	5	39	34	5
5	Portuguesa	15	18	5	5	8	23	29	-6
6	XV de Jaú	14	18	6	2	10	23	43	-20
7	XV de Piracicaba	13	18	4	5	9	36	46	-10
8	Juventus	11	18	4	3	11	23	38	-15
9	Taubaté	11	18	3	5	10	23	41	-19
10	São Bento-SCS	9	18	1	7	10	25	41	-16

Championship playoff

January 3, 1957

Santos	4–2	São Paulo

Santos declared as the Campeonato Paulista champions.

== State championship champions ==
State	Champion	State	Champion
Acre	Rio Branco-AC	Paraíba	Auto Esporte
Alagoas	CSA	Paraná	Coritiba
Amapá	Macapá	Pernambuco	Sport Recife
Amazonas	Auto Esporte-AM	Piauí	River
Bahia	Bahia	Rio de Janeiro	not disputed
Ceará	Gentilândia	Rio de Janeiro (DF)	Vasco
Espírito Santo	Vitória-ES	Rio Grande do Norte	América-RN
Goiás	Goiânia	Rio Grande do Sul	Grêmio
Maranhão	Sampaio Corrêa	Rondônia	Flamengo-RO
Mato Grosso	Atlético Matogrossense	Santa Catarina	Operário-SC
Minas Gerais	Atlético Mineiro; Cruzeiro^{(1)}	São Paulo	Santos
Pará	Paysandu	Sergipe	Santa Cruz-SE

^{(1)}Atlético Mineiro and Cruzeiro shared the Minas Gerais State Championship title.

== Other competition champions ==
Competition	Champion
Campeonato Brasileiro de Seleções Estaduais	São Paulo

== Brazil national team ==
The following table lists all the games played by the Brazil national football team in official competitions and friendly matches during 1956.

Date	Opposition	Result	Score	Brazil scorers	Competition
January 24, 1956	Chile	L	1-4	Maurinho	South American Championship
January 29, 1956	Paraguay	D	0-0	-	South American Championship
February 2, 1956	Peru	W	2-1	Álvaro, Zezinho	South American Championship
February 5, 1956	Argentina	W	1-0	Luisinho	South American Championship
February 10, 1956	Uruguay	D	0-0	-	South American Championship
March 1, 1956	Chile	W	2-1	Luisinho, Raul Klein	Panamerican Championship
March 6, 1956	Peru	W	1-0	Larry	Panamerican Championship
March 8, 1956	Mexico	W	2-1	Bodinho (2)	Panamerican Championship
March 13, 1956	Costa Rica	W	7-1	Larry (3), Chinesinho (3), Bodinho	Panamerican Championship
March 18, 1956	Argentina	D	2-2	Chinesinho, Ênio Andrade	Panamerican Championship
March 25, 1956	(Brazil) Atlético Mineiro	W	1-0	Álvaro	International Friendly (unofficial match)
April 1, 1956	Pernambuco State Combined Team	W	2-0	Escurinho, Didi	International Friendly (unofficial match)
April 8, 1956	Portugal	W	1-0	Gino	International Friendly
April 11, 1956	Switzerland	D	1-1	Gino	International Friendly
April 15, 1956	Austria	W	3-2	Gino, Zózimo, Didi	International Friendly
April 21, 1956	Czechoslovakia	D	0-0	-	International Friendly
April 25, 1956	Italy	L	0-3	-	International Friendly
May 1, 1956	Turkey	W	1-0	Djalma Santos	International Friendly
May 9, 1956	England	L	2-4	Paulinho, Didi	International Friendly
June 12, 1956	Paraguay	W	2-0	Ferreira (2)	Taça Oswaldo Cruz
June 17, 1956	Paraguay	W	5-2	Leônidas, Zizinho (2), Ferreira, Ílton Vaccari	Taça Oswaldo Cruz
June 24, 1956	Uruguay	W	2-0	Zizinho, Canário	Taça do Atlântico
July 1, 1956	Italy	W	2-0	Canário, Ferreira	International Friendly
July 8, 1956	Argentina	D	0-0	-	Taça do Atlântico
August 5, 1956	Czechoslovakia	L	0-1	-	International Friendly
August 8, 1956	Czechoslovakia	W	4-1	Zizinho (2), Pepe (2)	International Friendly
