= Martim Francisco =

Brazilian football coach (1928–1982)

- Martim Francisco as of 1954

Personal information
- Full name: Martim Francisco Ribeiro de Andrada
- Date of birth: 21 February 1928
- Place of birth: Barbacena, Minas Gerais, Brazil
- Date of death: 22 June 1982 (aged 54)
- Place of death: Belo Horizonte, Minas Gerais, Brazil

Youth career
- Years: Team
- ca. – 1941–?: Olympic Barbacena (MG)
- also: Juventus (Barbacena, MG)

Managerial career
- 1951: Villa Nova
- 1952: Siderúrgica
- 1953–1954: Atlético Mineiro
- 1954–1956: America
- 1956–1957: Vasco da Gama
- 1958: Internacional
- 1958–1960: Athletic Bilbao
- 1961: Vasco da Gama
- 1961–1962: Corinthians
- 1962: Comercial-SP
- 1963: Villa Nova
- 1963: Cruzeiro
- 1964: Atlético Mineiro
- 1965: Bangu
- 1964–1965: Elche
- 1965: Real Betis
- 1966–1967: Deportivo Logroñés
- 1967: Bangu
- 1967: → Houston Stars (loan)
- 1968: Valeriodoce
- 1969: América Mineiro
- 1970: Rodoviária
- 1971–1972: Villa Nova
- 1973: CRB
- 1973: Vasco da Gama de Passos
- 1976: Goiânia
- 1976–1977: Villa Nova-MG
- 1977: Guarani de Divinópolis
- 1979–1980: Gama
- 1981: Tiradentes-DF

Martim Francisco Ribeiro de Andrada (21 February 1928 (Note: The birthdate indicated is as per Leunam Leite, Sport Illustrado, 1954. BDFutbol names his birthdate as 22 February. Also 17 April 1928, Ouro Preto has been seen. Birthplace Barbacena seems likely, as the Andrada family and also Martim Francisco's first football club, Olympic, are based there.) – 22 June 1982) was a Brazilian association football coach. He is widely credited with the invention of the 4–2–4 formation when guiding his first club, the Villa Nova AC of Nova Lima, to the State Championship of Minas Gerais in 1951. He won further state championships with Atlético Mineiro of Belo Horizonte in 1953, CR Vasco da Gama of Rio de Janeiro in 1956 and SE Gama of Brasília in 1979. Other clubs he coached include Corinthians, Cruzeiro, America FC of Rio de Janeiro and Athletic Bilbao in Spain. With Bangu AC he won the State Champions' Cup of 1967.

Martim Francisco, scion of a distinguished Brazilian family – his ancestors include José Bonifácio de Andrada e Silva, considered the "Patriarch of Brazilian Independence", and many other lustrous personalities – studied psychology and law. An accident prevented him from playing football beyond the youth level and he never acquired a formal coaching diploma. In 1954 it was reported that he had 650 books about football, of which he considered El preparador técnico from Spain and Tácticas y técnicas from Argentina as the most important ones. In his opinion, the WM of Herbert Chapman and the third defender of Izidor Kürschner were the basis of all tactics. He considered from early on the intermingling of club officials with the work of the coach as a major problem. His bynames included primeiro lorde dos gramados brasileiros ("First Lord of the Brazilian fields"), professor and cientista do futebol ("Scientist of Football"). He died aged 54 from alcohol related illness.

== Career ==
=== Early years: from Minas Gerais via Rio de Janeiro to Spain ===
The 13-years old Martim Francisco joined the local team Olympic where he played as goalkeeper – with a brief interlude at EC Juventus – until an accident forced him to stop playing football. When the final course of his university studies took him to Rio de Janeiro, he had in 1948 the chance of getting a closer look at the coaching profession under the notable Uruguayan coach Ondino Viera, who then was in charge of Fluminense FC. On return to Minas Gerais he worked as assistant to Urbano Santos, who coached the state amateur team. In 1950 he became director of the regional department (departemento do interior) of the state football association FMF.

Martim Francisco commenced his club-coaching career 1951 at Villa Nova AC, based in Nova Lima. The club had won in the 1930s four times the state championship and since then had turned into one of the lesser sides of the competition. Francisco replaced the then common WM-formation, introduced to Brazil in the late 1930s by the Hungarian Izidor Kürschner and developed further by Flávio Costa, with the 4–2–4 system, which means the tactical line-up of the team consisted of four defenders, two midfielders and four attackers. To provide more equilibrium in the natural flow of a match one of the attackers was ordered back to midfield when the team was defending and on defender moved forward when the team was in attack. This concept is widely regarded an invention of Martim Francisco - at least he is credited with being the first one to having deliberately deployed it - and was used by the Brazilian national side when it won the World Cups of 1958 and 1962, albeit in the latter tournament evolved largely to a 4–3–3. Martim Francisco found the inspiration to the system by observing the final of the Copa Rio in July 1951 in the Maracanã Stadium, where SE Palmeiras of São Paulo overwhelmed Juventus FC of Turin in Italy. He thought, that Juventus might be able to reverse the flow of the match by pulling back one of their five attackers to midfield and a midfielder back to defence, transforming their 3–2–5 formation effectively to 4–2–4.

With this tactic he led Villa Nova, with some aid of Prão, a former player of the club who also held coaching responsibilities, to the State Championship of 1951, decided in matches against Atlético Mineiro in January 1952. This remains to date the last state championship of the club. Star of this side was the left-winger Benedito Custódio Ferreira "Escurinho", who later played for Fluminense and the national team.

Martim Francisco continued his career in 1952 with EC Siderúrgica from Sabará, also in the vicinity of the capital, state champions of 1937, which he took to the second place of the competition. In this year he also achieved a notable win with the state's youth team over the selection of Rio de Janeiro.

After this Martim Francisco coached the state's oldest and most successful club, Atlético Mineiro in the capital Belo Horizonte. He led the club in 1953 to its 16th state title. He left the club after a friendly match in Rio de Janeiro against Botafogo FR in mid March 1954. At least between 1951 and 1953 he was also coach of the state selection of Minas Gerais, which competed in the Campeonato Brasileiro de Seleções Estaduais, the championship of state teams.

His new club was America FC in the then national capital Rio de Janeiro where he succeeded by the end of March 1954 Otto Glória, who should later rise to fame in Europe with SL Benfica. In the ensuing Rio-São Paulo Tournament between the leading clubs of both cities America finished only eighth in a field of ten participants, but he could raise the team to second place in the Rio State Championship, behind CR Flamengo. 1955 brought improvement with a now fifth place in the Torneio Rio-São Paulo. In the State Championship America stayed in the race until the end, when a deciding matches against Flamengo had to be held end of March 1956. But by mid march Martim Francisco and America had already parted ways in deep controversy, after Francisco had signed for local rivals CR Vasco da Gama. America lost those matches under the Francisco's assistant coach Antônio Carlos Mangualde. Leônidas da Silva, the ageing top scorer of the 1938 World Cup, Canário who later played for Real Madrid, and the Argentine Martín Alarcón were amongst the best known players of America in these years.

In Vasco da Gama, Martim Francisco followed Flávio Costa. Over the last years the team had been in decline after its golden era when it was known as Expresso da Vitória. With the glamorous defender Hilderaldo Bellini, Orlando Peçanha and Vavá, all players that would feature in Brazil's World Cup winning side of 1958, Vasco won its first State Championship since 1952. In 1957 Vasco undertook a tour of Europe. There it won in June the well regarded tournaments of La Coruña in Spain and of Paris. In the final of the Trofeo Teresa Herrera Vasco defeated Athletic Bilbao 4–2 and at the Tournoi de Paris the European Champions Real Madrid with 4–3. In another friendly FC Barcelona was defeated 7–2 on their ground. The ensuing State Championship was less successful and Vasco finished only fourth. The relationship between Francisco and the club, at least in the end, was not amicable. In the context of his departure word was also spread, that he would be drinking irresponsibly. At Vasco he was succeeded in 1958 by Francisco de Souza Ferreira "Gradim" who brought new success to the club, winning both, the Rio-São Paulo and the state title.

During his time in Rio de Janeiro he also coached the selection of the Federal District, which the city of Rio then constituted. Rio was a finalist in the national championship in 1954 and 1956. Ahead of the 1957 South American Championship Martim Francisco was discussed as potential coach of the Brazilian national side, a job Osvaldo Brandão eventually would obtain with Vicente Feola as his assistant.

1958 Martim Francisco started with SC Internacional in Porto Alegre, taking the club to the second place in the metropolitan championship, behind arch-rivals Grêmio FBPA.

Mid year Martim Francisco followed an offer to join Athletic Bilbao, the Spanish Champions of 1956. In the ensuing two seasons he led the team around star defender Jesús Garay to two third places in the league and into the semifinals of the Spanish Cup, the Copa del Rey of 1960, losing there after a 3–0 home win spectacularly in the second leg with 1-8 to Real Madrid. Around Christmas 1960 Bilbao – then in 7th place, the same rank it would finish under the new coach Juan Antonio Ipiña – let him go. The team's performances were also marred by injury problems in that period.

=== Return to Brazil and again to Spain: 1961 - 1967 ===
Already in the first days of February he signed again with CR Vasco da Gama, for a reported monthly fee of 150,000 cruzeiros (equivalent to R$11,000 in 2020) until February 1962. Only three days later the club hosted Real Madrid in the Maracanã which just had defeated opposition in Chile Argentina and Chile 6–2 and 9–0. Thus, a 2–2 draw was considered a success, unlike the campaign of the club, with Bellini as the last reminder of more glorious days, in the Torneio Rio-São Paulo in March and April, where Vasco finished third, behind cross-town rivals Flamengo and Botafogo. From May until early July Vasco toured Europe, winning 12 of their 14 matches against largely second rate opposition, only losing to FC Porto. By mid July Martim Francisco announced his premature resignation, some indemnity payment to Vasco for the rest of his contract was worked out. Eli do Amparo, a star-player of the Expresso da Vitória era, succeeded him, but was replaced by September with the more experienced Paulo Amaral. Vasco would not win another title before 1966, when it won the Rio-São Paulo. The next state title even had to wait until 1970.

São Paulo side SC Corinthians Paulista hired him for a reported signing-on fee of 1.1 million plus a monthly salary of 110,000 cruzeiros as successor to Alfredo Ramos, who alongside José Castelli "Rato", another former Corinthians player, became part of his coaching staff. Corinthians achieved midfield placings in the 1961 State Championship and the Rio-São Paulo Tournament of 1962. In his tenure fell the second highest defeat ever of the club, a 0–7 against Portuguesa. After his farewell from the club in March 1962 there were rumours that he would guide Spain through the World Cup which was to take place in Chile in May and June. He was also talked about as potential coach of FC Barcelona and FC Porto, or as successor of Aymore Moreira at São Paulo FC who went on to take the coaching job of Brazil for the World Cup. Eventually, in May he took on a job with hinterland Club Comercial FC of Ribeirão Preto which by the end of the year would finish 9th out of the 16 sides taking part in the São Paulo Championship.

In 1963 he returned to Villa Nova AC, but during the course of the State Championship of Minas Gerais he switched to the top club Cruzeiro EC of Belo Horizonte around the star-player Tostão. Dirceu Lopes would debut in his time with the club, which went on to finish the season third under coach Leonízio Fantoni "Niginho", who previously led the club to a title hat-trick between 1959 and 1961. In the beginning of 1964 he coached once more Atlético Mineiro in several friendly matches.

Early July 1964, on matchday two of the Rio Championship, Martim Francisco replaced Denoni Alves on the bench of Bangu AC, a club of the west of the metropolis, then well in ascendancy. He stayed only for 18 matches. Under his replacements Moacir Bueno, who only filled in for one match, and Plácido Monsores the club finished second, equal on points with Fluminense FC and lost the match for the title 0–1. Bangu would remain amongst the top two for three more years, even winning the title in 1966, the second one after 1933 and last one in its history, becoming the last of the smaller clubs to win it.

Martim Francisco followed an offer of Spanish first division club Elche CF, fifth after the previous season and then under coach Rosendo Hernández after eight matches on place 13, relegation territory. Elche, with the young Marcial Pina, who would in later years feature for many years in the standard line-ups of FC Barcelona and Atlético de Madrid, finished the season safely as eighth. After this Martim Francisco led Real Betis, 13th of 16 clubs in 1963–64, into the new season. He started there with five defeats followed by two wins. After three more losses and a draw he was replaced early December 1965 with Ernesto Pons under whom the team showed better results, but finished last all the same. From January to February 1967 Martim Francisco coached second division side Deportivo Logroñés for six matches. After he quit there without much ado he was barred by the Spanish association for breach of contract from further work in the country.

=== 1967 forward: Bangu and a last title with Gama of Brasília ===
On 12 February 1967 Martim Francisco was back in Rio, once more with Bangu, taking the club through the Brazilian championship, then taking place as Taça Roberto Gomes Pedrosa. In March the championship match against Atlético Mineiro also served as the decider for the Torneio dos Campeões, a cup for the state champions of 1966 of Rio, São Paulo and Minas Gerais, in which Bangu won 1–0 in the Mineirão Stadium of Belo Horizonte. This was Bangu's last title of note and a reflection of strength of the side in that era. Bangu disappointed in the national championship – won by the top team of the era, SE Palmeiras – finishing only 9th, albeit being best side from Rio in the competition.

In May and June 1967 Bangu participated as Houston Stars in the championship of the United Soccer Association of the US, alongside eleven other teams like US Cagliari from Italy and English side Wolverhampton Wanderers, which traded as Chicago Mustangs and Los Angeles Wolves. The Houston Stars drew by far the biggest crowds, but finished only fourth in the Western division consisting of six sides.

Back in Rio, by early August, only a few matches into the series for the Taça Guanabara, Martim Francisco was replaced at the helm of Bangu with the Uruguayan star coach Ondino Viera, under whom Francisco made his first insights into coaching at Fluminense almost 20 years earlier.

The following years saw a decline in the career of Martim Francisco. He coached lesser teams in the Minas Gerais Championship like Valeriodoce EC of Itabira and América FC of Belo Horizonte, with the latter finishing third.

Life style issues came to the fore, and after some months in danger of death due to a severe cirrhosis he returned to Villa Nova in 1971, leading them to the first championship of the Brazilian second division, then trading as Campeonato Nacional da Primeira Divisão, which then operated without ascension or relegation. Symptoms of Martim Francisco's physical and mental decay resurfaced. Once he began to miss training sessions and even matches, the club acted and dismissed him in May 1972.

In the ensuing period he lived in the care and in the house of his aunt Dina in the Rua Timbira, near the centre of Belo Horizonte. Generous support was given by Villa Nova's president Fernando Marques Ribeiro and some fans. In this period CR Vasco da Gama considered a match in his support against Villa Nova in Vila Lima. Edu, Zico's brother, then playing for America FC of Rio, collected money to be passed on to Martim Francisco by Oto Glória.

Martim Francisco returned to coaching in June 1973 when he was hired by CR Brasil of Maceió in the north-eastern Brazilian state of Alagoas, with which he won one of the early rounds of the State Championship there undefeated. After a night out drinking with the president of their rivals AS São Domingos he signed up with them, for which by July both, he and the CSA president, got terminated, and the CRB president resigned in the context. However, fans of the club were vociferous in support of the retention of Martim Francisco. CRB went on to win the title, using five coaches in that year. Interviews with Martim Francisco in that era became highly erratic. Later on that year he was for a while on the bench of the Minas Gerais hinterland team Vasco da Gama de Passos.

After this episode, jobs were difficult to come by for Martim Francisco. In March 1974 a sports column of a Rio de Janeiro newspaper even included a note, with his telephone number that he would be available again "with new ideas". In April 1975 he accepted an offer to train the youth teams of America in Rio.

By the end of April 1976 he finally got an offer to take on Goiânia EC early into the second stage of the state championship of Goiás. A fortnight later, after two matches, a 4–0 at home and a 3–4 away, he was dismissed, officially because he could "acclimatise", unofficially because of uncommendable behaviour. Goiânia would finish the season second.

Later in 1976 he once more coached Villa Nova, with which he won, with Arizona, goalkeeper of Villa Nova's 1951 title-winning side, as joint coach, in April 1977 the state cup, the Taça Minas Gerais with a 2–1 win over América FC in Belo Horizonte, before moving on to lowly Guarani of Divinópolis, 120 kilometres west of Belo Horizonte for a monthly salary of 5000 cruzeiros. His brief time there was cut short late July by more problems with cirrhosis.

In 1979, he was appointed by SE Gama, founded in 1975 in Gama, one of the poorest satellite cities of Brasília, the national capital, then lying in fourth position of the championship of the Federal District. By August he won the competition with Gama through a 2–1 with two goals by Péricles, the star of the team and even in this semi-professional environment better paid then Francisco, over title holders Brasília EC - the first great success of the club. Gama finished in the latter part of the year 48th out of 94 clubs in the national championship, then named Copa Brasil. Before the start of the national championship 1980, which started in February, he was sacked by the club. During his time with Gama he also served as coach of the youth and adult selections of the Federal district.

In 1981 Martim Francesco was coach of Grêmio Esportivo Tiradentes in the Taça de Bronze, the tournament to establish the participant of the Federal District for the national third level championship of that year. Tiradentes lost the deciding match here against Taguatinga EC with 0–1 on 25 February 1981.

Martim Francisco died on 22 June 1982 in Belo Horizonte. Only 30 people were present when he was laid to rest at the Cemitério do Bonfim in the capital of Minas Gerais. He was survived by a wife and three children, who had parted ways a long time ago.

== Career summary ==
=== Clubs ===
- 1951: Villa Nova AC (Nova Lima, MG), State Championship of Minas Gerais 1951
- ca. 1951-53: also State Selection of Minas Gerais
- 1952: EC Siderúrgica (Sabará, MG), Runner-up State Championship of Minas Gerais 1952
- 1953-1954: Atlético Mineiro (Belo Horizonte, MG), State Championship of Minas Gerais 1953
- 1954-56: America FC (RJ), Runner-up State Championship of Rio de Janeiro 1954, 1955
- ca. 1954-56: also State Selection of the Federal District (then the city of Rio de Janeiro)
- 1956-57: CR Vasco da Gama, State Championship of Rio de Janeiro 1956, Trofeo Teresa Herrera 1957, Tournoi de Paris 1957
- 1958: SC Internacional (Porto Alegre, RS), Runner-up Championship of Porto Alegre 1958
- 1958-60: Athletic Bilbao (Spain, / 74 league matches, ranks 3, 3, 7.)
- 1961: CR Vasco da Gama
- 1961-62: SC Corinthians Paulista (São Paulo, 36 matches)
- 1962 Comercial FC (Ribeirão Preto, SP)
- 1963: Villa Nova AC (Nova Lima, MG)
- 1963: Cruzeiro EC (Belo Horizonte, MG)
- 1964: Atlético Mineiro (Belo Horizonte, MG)
- 1964: Bangu AC (RJ)
- 1964-65: Elche CF (Spain, league rank 8)
- 1965: Real Betis (Sevilla, Spain, 14 league matches)
- 1966-67: Deportivo Logroñés (Spain, 2nd division / 6 matches)
- 1967: Bangu AC (RJ), Copa dos Campeões Estaduais (State Champions' Cup),
  - Houston Stars - name of Bangu AC in the United Soccer League (May to July 1967)
- 1968: Valeriodoce EC (Itabira, MG)
- 1969: América FC (Belo Horizonte, MG)
- 1970: AA Rodoviários do Amazonas (Manaus, AM)
- 1971-72: Villa Nova AC (Nova Lima, MG), Championship of second national division 1971
- 1973: CR Brasil (Macéio, AL)
- 1973: Vasco da Gama de Passos (MG)
- 1975: America FC (RJ), youth coach
- 1976: Goiânia EC (GO)
- 1976-77: Villa Nova AC (Nova Lima, MG)
- 1977: Villa Nova AC (Nova Lima, MG)
- 1977: Guarani EC (Divinópolis, MG)
- 1979-80: SE Gama, Championship of the Federal District 1979
- 1980: Selection of the Distrito Federal, Sub-20 Selection of the Distrito Federal
- 1981: Grêmio Esportivo Tiradentes (DF)

Note

- In some texts Martim Francisco is also listed as coach of Olympic Club Barbacena (MG). However, this engagement could neither be dated nor verified in any other way. It might have taken place ca. 1970.

=== Honours ===
- State Championship of Minas Gerais: 1951, 1953
- State Championship of Rio de Janeiro: 1956
- Championship of the Federal District: 1979
- Championship of the Second Division of Brazil: 1971
- Taça Minas Gerais: 1977

Major invitational tournaments

- Torneio dos Campeões (1967), Belo Horizonte (MG)
- Trofeo Teresa Herrera, La Coruña, Spain: 1957
- Tournoi de Paris, France: 1957
