= 1980 Campeonato Brasileiro Série A =

Campeonato Brasileiro Série A
- Season: 1980
- Champions: Flamengo (1st title)
- Copa Libertadores de América: Flamengo; Atlético Mineiro
- Matches: 307
- Goals: 826 (2.69 per match)
- Top goalscorer: Zico (Flamengo) - 21 goals
- Biggest home win: Coritiba 7–1 Ferroviário-CE (April 3, 1980); Coritiba 7–1 Desportiva (May 4, 1980)
- Biggest away win: Vitória 0–5 Ceará (March 5, 1980); Itabaiana 0–5 Náutico (March 30, 1980); Vitória 0–5 Vasco da Gama (May 7, 1980)
- Highest scoring: São Paulo 5–3 Coritiba (March 8, 1980); Flamengo 6–2 Palmeiras (April 13, 1980); Coritiba 7–1 Ferroviário-CE (April 3, 1980); Vitória 2–6 Corinthians (April 21, 1980); Coritiba 7–1 Desportiva (May 4, 1980)
- Average attendance: 20,792

The 1980 Campeonato Brasileiro Série A, (officially the VI Copa Brasil) was the 25th edition of the Campeonato Brasileiro Série A.

== Teams and locations ==
Locations of the 1980 Série A teams

The teams were selected by record on previous state championship.

State	Team	Qualification method
(São Paulo (state)) São Paulo; 8 berths	Corinthians	1979 Campeonato Paulista Champion
(São Paulo (state)) São Paulo; 8 berths	Ponte Preta	1979 Campeonato Paulista Runners-up
(São Paulo (state)) São Paulo; 8 berths	Palmeiras	1979 Campeonato Paulista Semi-finalist
(São Paulo (state)) São Paulo; 8 berths	Guarani	1979 Campeonato Paulista Semi-finalist
(São Paulo (state)) São Paulo; 8 berths	São Paulo	1979 Campeonato Paulista 7th
(São Paulo (state)) São Paulo; 8 berths	Santos	1979 Campeonato Paulista 5th
(São Paulo (state)) São Paulo; 8 berths	Portuguesa	1979 Campeonato Paulista 8th
(São Paulo (state)) São Paulo; 8 berths	América-SP^{1}	Promoted from 1980 Taça de Prata
(Rio de Janeiro (state)) Rio de Janeiro; 7 berths	Flamengo	1979 Campeonato Carioca Champions
(Rio de Janeiro (state)) Rio de Janeiro; 7 berths	Fluminense	1979 Campeonato Carioca Runners-up
(Rio de Janeiro (state)) Rio de Janeiro; 7 berths	Vasco da Gama	1979 Campeonato Carioca 3rd
(Rio de Janeiro (state)) Rio de Janeiro; 7 berths	Botafogo	1979 Campeonato Carioca 4th
(Rio de Janeiro (state)) Rio de Janeiro; 7 berths	America-RJ	1979 Campeonato Carioca 9th
(Rio de Janeiro (state)) Rio de Janeiro; 7 berths	Americano^{1}	Promoted from 1980 Taça de Prata
(Rio de Janeiro (state)) Rio de Janeiro; 7 berths	Bangu^{1}	Promoted from 1980 Taça de Prata
Pernambuco; 3 berths	Santa Cruz	1979 Campeonato Pernambucano Champions
Pernambuco; 3 berths	Náutico	1979 Campeonato Pernambucano Runners-up
Pernambuco; 3 berths	Sport Recife^{1}	Promoted from 1980 Taça de Prata
(Rio Grande do Sul) Rio Grande do Sul; 3 berths	Grêmio	1979 Campeonato Gaúcho Champions
(Rio Grande do Sul) Rio Grande do Sul; 3 berths	Internacional	1979 Campeonato Gaúcho 3rd
(Rio Grande do Sul) Rio Grande do Sul; 3 berths	São Paulo-RS	1979 Campeonato Gaúcho 4th
(Bahia) Bahia; 2 berths	Bahia	1979 Campeonato Baiano Champions
(Bahia) Bahia; 2 berths	Vitória	1979 Campeonato Baiano Runners-up
(Ceará) Ceará; 2 berths	Ferroviário	1979 Campeonato Cearense Champions
(Ceará) Ceará; 2 berths	Ceará	1979 Campeonato Cearense 3rd
(Goiás) Goiás; 2 berths	Vila Nova	1979 Campeonato Goiano Champions
(Goiás) Goiás; 2 berths	Atlético Goianiense	1979 Campeonato Goiano Runners-up
(Minas Gerais) Minas Gerais; 2 berths	Atlético Mineiro	1979 Campeonato Mineiro Champions
(Minas Gerais) Minas Gerais; 2 berths	Cruzeiro	1979 Campeonato Mineiro Runners-up
(Paraná (state)) Paraná; 2 berths	Coritiba	1979 Campeonato Paranaense Champions
(Paraná (state)) Paraná; 2 berths	Colorado	1979 Campeonato Paranaense Runners-up
Alagoas	CRB	1979 Campeonato Alagoano Champions
(Amazonas (Brazilian state)) Amazonas	Nacional-AM	1979 Campeonato Amazonense Champions
(Federal District (Brazil)) Distrito Federal	Gama	1979 Campeonato Brasiliense Champions
Espírito Santo	Desportiva	1979 Campeonato Capixaba Champions
Maranhão	Maranhão	1979 Campeonato Maranhense Champions
Mato Grosso	Mixto	1979 Campeonato Matogrossense Champions
Mato Grosso do Sul	Operário	1979 Campeonato Sul-Mato-grossense Champions
Pará	Remo	1979 Campeonato Paraense Runners-up
Paraíba	Botafogo-PB	1979 Campeonato Paraibano Runners-up
Piauí	Flamengo	1979 Campeonato Piauiense Champions
Rio Grande do Norte	América de Natal	1979 Campeonato Potiguar Champions
(Santa Catarina (state)) Santa Catarina	Joinville	1979 Campeonato Catarinense Champions
Sergipe	Itabaiana	1979 Campeonato Sergipano Champions

^{1} Entered directly on second phase.

== First phase ==
=== Group A ===
Pos	Team	Pld	W	D	L	GF	GA	GD	Pts	Qualification
1	(São Paulo (state)) Corinthians	9	7	1	1	18	8	+10	15	Second phase
2	(Rio de Janeiro (state)) Botafogo	9	4	2	3	16	10	+6	10	Second phase
3	(Paraná (state)) Colorado	9	4	2	3	9	10	−1	10	Second phase
4	(Pará) Remo	9	4	2	3	6	8	−2	10	Second phase
5	(Minas Gerais) Cruzeiro	9	3	4	2	9	9	0	10	Second phase
6	(Santa Catarina (state)) Joinville	9	3	3	3	15	9	+6	9	Second phase
7	Bahia	9	3	2	4	10	9	+1	8	Second phase
8	(Mato Grosso do Sul) Operário-MS	9	3	2	4	8	12	−4	8	
9	(Alagoas) CRB	9	2	1	6	9	13	−4	5	
10	(São Paulo (state)) Portuguesa	9	2	1	6	7	19	−12	5	

=== Group B ===
Pos	Team	Pld	W	D	L	GF	GA	GD	Pts	Qualification
1	(Minas Gerais) Atlético Mineiro	9	7	1	1	22	7	+15	15	Second phase
2	(Rio de Janeiro (state)) Fluminense	9	4	4	1	18	10	+8	12	Second phase
3	(São Paulo (state)) Palmeiras	9	4	3	2	16	7	+9	11	Second phase
4	Ceará	9	3	3	3	13	11	+2	9	Second phase
5	(São Paulo (state)) Guarani	9	3	3	3	9	7	+2	9	Second phase
6	(Bahia) Vitória	9	3	3	3	16	17	−1	9	Second phase
7	(Espírito Santo) Desportiva	9	3	2	4	10	14	−4	8	Second phase
8	(Rio Grande do Norte) América-RN	9	1	5	3	6	18	−12	7	
9	(Goiás) Vila Nova	9	2	2	5	5	15	−10	6	
10	(Piauí) Flamengo-PI	9	1	2	6	9	18	−9	4	

=== Group C ===
Pos	Team	Pld	W	D	L	GF	GA	GD	Pts	Qualification
1	(São Paulo (state)) Santos	9	7	1	1	17	5	+12	15	Second phase
2	(Rio de Janeiro (state)) Flamengo	9	5	3	1	16	7	+9	13	Second phase
3	(Paraíba) Botafogo-PB	9	5	1	3	14	16	−2	11	Second phase
4	(Rio Grande do Sul) Internacional	9	5	0	4	13	10	+3	10	Second phase
5	(São Paulo (state)) Ponte Preta	9	4	2	3	20	11	+9	10	Second phase
6	(Ceará) Ferroviário-CE	9	2	4	3	9	10	−1	8	Second phase
7	(Pernambuco) Náutico	9	2	3	4	12	14	−2	7	Second phase
8	(Sergipe) Itabaiana	9	3	0	6	10	22	−12	6	
9	(Mato Grosso) Mixto	9	2	1	6	11	18	−7	5	
10	(Rio Grande do Sul) São Paulo-RS	9	1	3	5	6	15	−9	5	

=== Group D ===
Pos	Team	Pld	W	D	L	GF	GA	GD	Pts	Qualification
1	(Paraná (state)) Coritiba	9	5	2	2	16	11	+5	12	Second phase
2	(Rio Grande do Sul) Grêmio	9	4	4	1	18	8	+10	12	Second phase
3	(São Paulo (state)) São Paulo	9	4	4	1	17	10	+7	12	Second phase
4	(Rio de Janeiro (state)) Vasco da Gama	9	5	1	3	12	7	+5	11	Second phase
5	(Pernambuco) Santa Cruz	9	4	3	2	12	10	+2	11	Second phase
6	(Goiás) Atlético-GO	9	3	5	1	11	7	+4	11	Second phase
7	(Rio de Janeiro (state)) América-RJ	9	2	2	5	9	11	−2	6	Second phase
8	(Federal District (Brazil)) Gama	9	1	4	4	9	18	−9	6	
9	(Amazonas (Brazilian state)) Nacional-AM	9	1	3	5	4	15	−11	5	
10	Maranhão	9	0	4	5	3	14	−11	4	

== Second phase ==
=== Group E ===
Pos	Team	Pld	W	D	L	GF	GA	GD	Pts	Qualification
1	(Rio de Janeiro (state)) Vasco da Gama	6	4	2	0	16	5	+11	10	Third phase
2	(São Paulo (state)) Corinthians	6	4	1	1	19	9	+10	9	Third phase
3	(Pernambuco) Náutico	6	1	1	4	5	9	−4	3	
4	(Bahia) Vitória	6	1	0	5	3	20	−17	2	

=== Group F ===
Pos	Team	Pld	W	D	L	GF	GA	GD	Pts	Qualification
1	(São Paulo (state)) São Paulo	6	3	3	0	15	8	+7	9	Third phase
2	(Rio de Janeiro (state)) Botafogo	6	3	1	2	11	9	+2	7	Third phase
3	Ceará	6	1	2	3	7	11	−4	4	
4	(Rio de Janeiro (state)) Americano	6	1	2	3	2	7	−5	4	

=== Group G ===
Pos	Team	Pld	W	D	L	GF	GA	GD	Pts	Qualification
1	(Rio Grande do Sul) Internacional	6	5	0	1	19	6	+13	10	Third phase
2	(Minas Gerais) Atlético Mineiro	6	5	0	1	15	5	+10	10	Third phase
3	(Goiás) Atlético-GO	6	1	0	5	5	16	−11	2	
4	Bahia	6	1	0	5	5	17	−12	2	

=== Group H ===
Pos	Team	Pld	W	D	L	GF	GA	GD	Pts	Qualification
1	(Minas Gerais) Cruzeiro	6	4	2	0	10	2	+8	10	Third phase
2	(Rio de Janeiro (state)) Fluminense	6	2	3	1	9	6	+3	7	Third phase
3	(Pernambuco) Sport	6	1	2	3	5	8	−3	4	
4	(Paraíba) Botafogo-PB	6	0	3	3	4	12	−8	3	

=== Group I ===
Pos	Team	Pld	W	D	L	GF	GA	GD	Pts	Qualification
1	(São Paulo (state)) Santos	6	3	1	2	9	5	+4	7	Third phase
2	(São Paulo (state)) Guarani	6	2	2	2	5	6	−1	6 (Note: Guarani ended up tied with América-RJ in every tiebreaking criteria, so a play-off was disputed, in which Guarani won by 3-2.)	Third phase
3	(Rio de Janeiro (state)) América-RJ	6	2	2	2	5	6	−1	6	
4	(Santa Catarina (state)) Joinville	6	1	3	2	5	7	−2	5	

=== Group J ===
Pos	Team	Pld	W	D	L	GF	GA	GD	Pts	Qualification
1	(Rio de Janeiro (state)) Flamengo	6	4	2	0	15	6	+9	10	Third phase
2	(São Paulo (state)) Palmeiras	6	2	2	2	10	13	−3	6	Third phase
3	(Pernambuco) Santa Cruz	6	1	3	2	8	7	+1	5	
4	(Rio de Janeiro (state)) Bangu	6	1	1	4	6	13	−7	3	

=== Group K ===
Pos	Team	Pld	W	D	L	GF	GA	GD	Pts	Qualification
1	(Paraná (state)) Coritiba	6	4	2	0	17	3	+14	10	Third phase
2	(Espírito Santo) Desportiva	6	3	1	2	8	14	−6	7	Third phase
3	(Pará) Remo	6	2	1	3	8	6	+2	5	
4	(Ceará) Ferroviário-CE	6	0	2	4	4	14	−10	2	

=== Group L ===
Pos	Team	Pld	W	D	L	GF	GA	GD	Pts	Qualification
1	(Rio Grande do Sul) Grêmio	6	5	0	1	13	5	+8	10	Third phase
2	(São Paulo (state)) Ponte Preta	6	4	0	2	8	6	+2	8	Third phase
3	(Paraná (state)) Colorado	6	2	0	4	9	7	+2	4	
4	(São Paulo (state)) América-SP	6	1	0	5	6	18	−12	2	

== Third phase ==
=== Group M ===
Pos	Team	Pld	W	D	L	GF	GA	GD	Pts	Qualification
1	(Minas Gerais) Atlético Mineiro	3	1	2	0	2	0	+2	4	Semi-finals
2	(Rio de Janeiro (state)) Vasco da Gama	3	1	2	0	3	2	+1	4	
3	(São Paulo (state)) São Paulo	3	1	1	1	4	4	0	3	
4	(Rio de Janeiro (state)) Fluminense	3	0	1	2	3	6	−3	1	

=== Group N ===
Pos	Team	Pld	W	D	L	GF	GA	GD	Pts	Qualification
1	(Rio Grande do Sul) Internacional	3	3	0	0	5	2	+3	6	Semi-finals
2	(São Paulo (state)) Guarani	3	1	1	1	3	2	+1	3	
3	(São Paulo (state)) Palmeiras	3	0	2	1	1	2	−1	2	
4	(Minas Gerais) Cruzeiro	3	0	1	2	0	3	−3	1	

=== Group O ===
Pos	Team	Pld	W	D	L	GF	GA	GD	Pts	Qualification
1	(Rio de Janeiro (state)) Flamengo	3	2	1	0	6	1	+5	5	Semi-finals
2	(São Paulo (state)) Santos	3	1	1	1	3	2	+1	3	
3	(Espírito Santo) Desportiva	3	1	1	1	2	4	−2	3	
4	(São Paulo (state)) Ponte Preta	3	0	1	2	2	6	−4	1	

=== Group P ===
Pos	Team	Pld	W	D	L	GF	GA	GD	Pts	Qualification
1	(Paraná (state)) Coritiba	3	2	0	1	2	1	+1	4	Semi-finals
2	(Rio Grande do Sul) Grêmio	3	2	0	1	2	5	−3	4	
3	(São Paulo (state)) Corinthians	3	1	1	1	6	2	+4	3	
4	(Rio de Janeiro (state)) Botafogo	3	0	1	2	1	3	−2	1	

== Semi-finals ==
=== First leg ===
21 May 1980

Atlético Mineiro (Minas Gerais)	1–1	(Rio Grande do Sul) Internacional
Reinaldo 40'		Cléo 53'

Mineirão, Belo Horizonte (MG)
Attendance: 63,633
Referee: (Rio de Janeiro (state)) José Roberto Wright

21 May 1980

Coritiba (Paraná (state))	0–2	(Rio de Janeiro (state)) Flamengo
		Zico 24', 59'

Couto Pereira, Curitiba (PR)
Attendance: 58,311
Referee: (São Paulo (state)) José de Assis Aragão

=== Second leg ===
25 May 1980

Internacional (Rio Grande do Sul)	0–3	(Minas Gerais) Atlético Mineiro
		Reinaldo 17'; Éder 45', 90'

Beira-Rio, Porto Alegre (RS)
Attendance: 59,087
Referee: (São Paulo (state)) Roberto Nunes Morgado

25 May 1980

Flamengo (Rio de Janeiro (state))	4–3	(Paraná (state)) Coritiba
Nunes 32', 36'; Carlos Alberto 39'; Anselmo 72'		Vilson Tadei 20'; Aladim 29'; Luís Freire 89'

Maracanã, Rio de Janeiro (RJ)
Attendance: 87,934
Referee: (Rio Grande do Sul) Carlos Sérgio Rosa Martins

== Finals ==
=== First leg ===
28 May 1980

Atlético Mineiro (Minas Gerais)	1–0	(Rio de Janeiro (state)) Flamengo
Reinaldo 55'

Mineirão, Belo Horizonte (MG)
Attendance: 90,028
Referee: (São Paulo (state)) Romualdo Arppi Filho

=== Second leg ===
1 June 1980

Flamengo (Rio de Janeiro (state))	3–2	(Minas Gerais) Atlético Mineiro
Nunes 7', 82'; Zico 44'		Reinaldo 8', 66'

Maracanã, Rio de Janeiro (RJ)
Attendance: 154,355
Referee: (São Paulo (state)) José de Assis Aragão

== Final standings ==
Pos	Team	Pld	W	D	L	GF	GA	GD	Pts
1	Flamengo	22	14	6	2	46	20	+26	34
2	Atlético Mineiro	22	15	4	3	46	16	+30	34
3	Internacional	20	13	1	6	38	22	+16	27
4	Coritiba	20	11	4	5	38	21	+17	26
5	Corinthians	18	12	3	3	43	19	+24	27
6	Grêmio	18	11	4	3	33	18	+15	26
7	Santos	18	11	3	4	29	12	+17	25
8	Vasco da Gama	18	10	5	3	31	14	+17	25
9	São Paulo	18	8	8	2	36	22	+14	24
10	Cruzeiro	18	7	7	4	19	14	+5	21
11	Fluminense	18	6	8	4	30	22	+8	20
12	Ponte Preta	18	8	3	7	30	23	+7	19
13	Palmeiras	18	6	7	5	27	22	+5	19
14	Botafogo	18	7	4	7	28	22	+6	18
15	Desportiva Capixaba	18	7	4	7	20	32	−12	18
16	Guarani	18	6	6	6	17	15	+2	18
17	Santa Cruz	15	5	6	4	20	17	+3	16
18	Remo	15	6	3	6	14	14	0	15
19	Colorado	15	6	2	7	18	17	+1	14
20	Botafogo-PB	15	5	4	6	18	28	−10	14
21	Joinville	15	4	6	5	20	16	+4	14
22	Ceará	15	4	5	6	20	22	−2	13
23	Atlético-GO	15	4	5	6	16	23	−7	13
24	América-RJ	15	4	4	7	14	17	−3	12
25	Vitória	15	4	3	8	19	37	−18	11
26	Bahia	15	4	2	9	15	26	−11	10
27	Náutico	15	3	4	8	17	23	−6	10
28	Ferroviário-CE	15	2	6	7	13	24	−11	10
29	Sport	6	1	2	3	5	8	−3	4
30	Americano	6	1	2	3	2	7	−5	4
31	Bangu	6	1	1	4	6	13	−7	3
32	América-SP	6	1	0	5	6	18	−12	2
33	Operário-MS	9	3	2	4	8	12	−4	8
34	América-RN	9	1	5	3	6	18	−12	7
35	Itabaiana	9	3	0	6	10	22	−12	6
36	Vila Nova-GO	9	2	2	5	5	15	−10	6
37	Gama	9	1	4	4	9	18	−9	6
38	CRB	9	2	1	6	9	13	−4	5
39	Mixto	9	2	1	6	11	18	−7	5
40	Portuguesa	9	2	1	6	7	19	−12	5
41	São Paulo-RS	9	1	3	5	6	15	−9	5
42	Nacional	9	1	3	5	4	15	−11	5
43	Flamengo-PI	9	1	2	6	9	18	−9	4
44	Maranhão	9	0	4	5	3	14	−11	4

Source: rsssf.com
