= Aladim Luciano =

Brazilian footballer

Aladim
Personal information
- Full name: Aladim Luciano
- Date of birth: 10 October 1946 (age 80)
- Place of birth: Barra Mansa, Brazil
- Height: 1.71 m (5 ft 7 in)
- Position: Left winger

Youth career
- Bangu

Senior career*
Years	Team	Apps	(Gls)
1963–1970	Bangu		
1967	→ Houston Stars (loan)		
1970–1973	Corinthians	116	(16)
1973–1977	Coritiba		
1978	Atlético Paranaense		
1979–1980	Coritiba		
1981	Colorado-PR		
1981	Vitória		
1982–1983	Colorado-PR		
1983–1984	Coritiba		
- * Club domestic league appearances and goals as of 20 March 2024

Aladim Luciano (born 10 October 1946) is a Brazilian former professional footballer who played as a left winger.

== Career ==
Quick and a dribbler, Aladim began his career at Bangu, where he played from 1963 to 1970, becoming champion in 1965. He was loaned alongside other players to the Houston Stars of the NASL, and in 1971 he arrived at Corinthians, where he made 116 appearances and won Torneio do Povo. In Coritiba, he won the competition again, in addition to the state championship five times.

== Personal life ==
Aladim was elected councilor in Curitiba in the 2004 municipal elections.

== Honours ==
Bangu

- Campeonato Carioca: 1966
- Copa dos Campeões Estaduais: 1967
- Torneio Quadrangular dos Campeões: 1968

Corinthians

- Torneio do Povo: 1971

Coritiba

- Torneio do Povo: 1973
- Campeonato Paranaense: 1973, 1974, 1975, 1976, 1979
