= Paulo Borges =

Brazilian footballer (1944–2011)

Personal information
- Full name: Paulo Luís Borges
- Date of birth: 24 December 1944
- Place of birth: Itaocara, Brazil
- Date of death: 15 July 2011 (aged 66)
- Place of death: São Paulo, Brazil
- Position: Right winger

Youth career
- –1962: Bangu

Senior career*
Years	Team	Apps	(Gls)
1962–1968	Bangu	208	(108)
1967	→ Houston Stars (loan)		
1968–1974	Corinthians	236	(62)
1971	→ Palmeiras (loan)	12	(1)
1972–1973	→ Pontagrossense (loan)		
1974	→ Nacional-AM (loan)		
1975	Vasco da Gama		

International career
1966–1968	Brazil	16	(3)
- * Club domestic league appearances and goals

Paulo Luís Borges (24 December 1944 – 15 July 2011), simply known as Paulo Borges, was a Brazilian professional footballer who played as a right winger.

== Club career ==
Revealed by Bangu, he played for the club until 1966, when he was state champion and top scorer in the championship. In 1967 he was loaned to the Houston Stars of the NASL, alongside another Bangu standout, Ubirajara Motta. In 1968 he was hired by Corinthians where he formed an attacking partnership with Flávio Minuano, and in his debut, he overturned the club's historical taboo against Pelé's Santos FC. He also had spells at Palmeiras, Pontagrossense, Nacional-AM and Vasco da Gama.

== International career ==
Borges played for the Brazil national team from 1966 to 1968, making 17 appearances and scoring 3 goals.

== Death ==
Paulo Borges died in São Paulo, 15 July 2011, due to lung cancer.

== Honours ==
Bangu

- Campeonato Carioca: 1966
- Copa dos Campeões Estaduais: 1967

Corinthians

- Torneio do Povo: 1971

Brazil

- Copa Rio Branco: 1967 (shared), 1968
- Taça Jorge Chávez/Santos Dumont: 1968
- Taça Oswaldo Cruz: 1968

Individual

- 1966 Campeonato Carioca top scorer: 16 goals
- 1967 Campeonato Carioca top scorer: 13 goals
