= 1967 Copa Minas =

Brazilian soccer tournament

The Copa Minas (Minas Cup) - was an interclub tournament for association football clubs from Brazil, organised in 1967 by the football association of the state of Minas Gerais, the Federação Mineira de Futebol. Participants were the 1966 state champions of

- Rio de Janeiro: Bangu AC (RJ)
- São Paulo: SE Palmeiras (SP)
- Minas Gerais: Cruzeiro EC (Belo Horizonte)

and

- Atlético Mineiro (BH), as runner-up in the Minas Gerais state championship of 1966.

The RSSSF cataloged it as one of the nine editions of the Torneio Quadrangular de Belo Horizonte (Foursquare Tournament of Belo Horizonte). This list, however, is not official. On its official website, Bangu lists this achievement as a national title, under the name Copa dos Campeões (Champions Cup).

== The matches ==
Venue of all matches was the Estádio Governador Magalhães Pinto, commonly known as Mineirão, in Belo Horizonte, the capital of Minas Gerais. The first four matches were held in two double features.

18 January 1967:

- Attendance: 32,552 Revenue: 98,000 cruzeiros
- Atlético 3-1 SE Palmeiras
- Cruzeiro EC 0-2 Bangu AC

22 January 1967:

- Attendance: 55,478 Revenue: 160,000 cruzeiros
- Bangu AC 2-2 Atlético Mineiro
- Cruzeiro EC 3-2 SE Palmeiras

19 March 1967 - the final:

The deciding match served also as a match for the Torneio Roberto Gomes Pedrosa, a national tournament recognised ca. 2010 as official national championship.

- Attendance: 16,773 Revenue: 34,000 cruzeiros
- Atlético Mineiro 0-1 Bangu AC
- Atletico: Luizinho; Canindé (Warlei), Vânder, Grapete, Décio Teixeira; Vanderlei Paiva, Santana; Buião, Ronaldo, Beto (Edgar Maia), Tião - Coach: Gérson dos Santos.
- Bangu: Ubirajara Motta; Cabrita, Mário Tito, Luis Alberto, Pedrinho; Ocimar, Jair; Paulo Borges, Cabralzinho (Fernando), Tonho, Aladim - Coach: Martim Francisco.
- Referee: José Teixeira de Carvalho or José Gomes Sobrinho (RJ)
- Goal: Cabralzinho (8'); Expulsion: Vanderlei Paiva

== See also ==
- Torneio dos Campeões da CBD (1969)
- Torneio dos Campeões da CBF (1982)
