= Nílton dos Santos =

Brazilian footballer

Personal information
- Full name: Nílton dos Santos
- Date of birth: 7 June 1935 (age 91)
- Place of birth: Caxambu, Brazil
- Height: 1.67 m (5 ft 6 in)
- Position: Left back

Youth career
- Fluminense (Caxambu)

Senior career*
| Years | Team | Apps | (Gls) |
| 1953–1965 | Bangu | 506 | (7) |
- * Club domestic league appearances and goals as of 20 February 2024

Nílton dos Santos (born 7 June 1935) is a Brazilian former professional footballer who played as a left back.

== Career ==
Namesake and contemporary of Nílton Santos, Nílton dos Santos was Bangu's left back from 1953 to 1965, and played 506 matches for the club, being the second athlete with the most appearances, behind only Ubirajara Motta, and considered one of the great idols in the history of Bangu. He was called up to the Brazil national football team in 1956, but never took to the field.

== Honours ==
Bangu

- International Soccer League: 1960

Individual

- Prêmio Belfort Duarte: 1956
