= 1956 São Paulo FC season =

São Paulo
1956 season
- Chairman: Cícero Pompeu de Toledo
- Manager: Vicente Feola
- Campeonato Paulista: Runners-up

The 1956 football season was São Paulo's 27th season since club's existence.

== Overall ==
Games played	72 (36 Campeonato Paulista, 36 Friendly match)
Games won	45 (25 Campeonato Paulista, 20 Friendly match)
Games drawn	10 (5 Campeonato Paulista, 5 Friendly match)
Games lost	17 (6 Campeonato Paulista, 11 Friendly match)
Goals scored	193
Goals conceded	105
Goal difference	+88
Best result	7–2 (H) v Noroeste – Campeonato Paulista – 1956.07.14
Worst result	1–4 (A) v Santos – Friendly match – 1956.01.21
Most appearances	
Top scorer	

Source: São Paulo FC

== Friendlies ==
January 21 National	Santos	4–1	São Paulo	Santos
	Goal		Goal	Stadium: Estádio Urbano Caldeira (Vila Belmiro)

January 24 Torneio Juscelino Kubitschek	América-MG	2–2	São Paulo	Belo Horizonte
	Goal		Goal	Stadium: Estádio Raimundo Sampaio (Independência)

January 26 Torneio Juscelino Kubitschek	Atlético Mineiro	1–2	São Paulo	Belo Horizonte
	Goal		Goal	Stadium: Estádio Raimundo Sampaio (Independência)

March 4 National	Ponte Preta	2–3	São Paulo	Campinas
	Goal		Goal	Stadium: Estádio Moisés Lucarelli

March 8 National	Santos	6–4	São Paulo	Santos
	Goal		Goal	Stadium: Estádio Urbano Caldeira (Vila Belmiro)

March 11 Torneio R. Gomes Pedroza (International)	São Paulo (Brazil)	4–0	(Argentina) Boca Juniors	São Paulo
	Goal			Stadium: Estádio Municipal Paulo Machado de Carvalho (Pacaembu)

March 15 Torneio R. Gomes Pedroza (International)	São Paulo (Brazil)	3–4	(Uruguay) Nacional	São Paulo
	Goal		Goal	Stadium: Estádio Municipal Paulo Machado de Carvalho (Pacaembu)

March 18 National	Catanduva	1–3	São Paulo	Catanduva
	Goal		Goal

March 22 Torneio R. Gomes Pedroza (International)	São Paulo (Brazil)	0–1	(Argentina) Newell's Old Boys	São Paulo
			Goal	Stadium: Estádio Municipal Paulo Machado de Carvalho (Pacaembu)

March 25 National	Rio Branco-ES	1–3	São Paulo	Vitória
	Goal		Goal

April 7 Torneio R. Gomes Pedroza (National)	Corinthians	2–2	São Paulo	São Paulo
	Goal		Goal	Stadium: Estádio Municipal Paulo Machado de Carvalho (Pacaembu)

April 14 Torneio R. Gomes Pedroza (National)	Portuguesa	0–2	São Paulo	São Paulo
			Goal	Stadium: Estádio Municipal Paulo Machado de Carvalho (Pacaembu)

April 19 Torneio R. Gomes Pedroza (National)	Palmeiras	2–0	São Paulo	São Paulo
	Goal			Stadium: Estádio Municipal Paulo Machado de Carvalho (Pacaembu)

April 22 Torneio Triangular de Franca	São Paulo	1–3	Atlético Mineiro	Franca
	Goal		Goal

April 24 Torneio Triangular de Franca	Francana	2–3	São Paulo	Franca
	Goal		Goal

April 29 Torneio R. Gomes Pedroza (National)	Santos	3–5	São Paulo	São Paulo
	Goal		Goal	Stadium: Estádio Municipal Paulo Machado de Carvalho (Pacaembu)

May 1 Taça Presidentes	Mandaguari	0–2	São Paulo	Mandaguari
			Goal

May 5 National	Operário	1–1	São Paulo	Ponta Grossa
	Goal		Goal

May 6 National	Guarani-PR	0–0	São Paulo	Ponta Grossa

May 20 Taça Irmãos del Rey	Barretos	0–2	São Paulo	Barretos
			Goal

May 23 Taça Charles Miller	Palmeiras	1–2	São Paulo	São Paulo
	Goal		Goal	Stadium: Estádio Municipal Paulo Machado de Carvalho (Pacaembu)

May 27 National	Comercial	1–2	São Paulo	Ribeirão Preto
	Goal		Goal

May 30 Taça Charles Miller	São Paulo	3–1	Corinthians	São Paulo
	Goal		Goal	Stadium: Estádio Municipal Paulo Machado de Carvalho (Pacaembu)

June 3 National	Sanjoanense	2–7	São Paulo	São João da Boa Vista
	Goal		Goal

June 6 Troféu San-São	Santos	3–0	São Paulo	São Paulo
	Goal			Stadium: Estádio Municipal Paulo Machado de Carvalho (Pacaembu)

June 10 National	Rio Preto	2–2	São Paulo	São José do Rio Preto
	Goal		Goal

June 17 National	Internacional	4–3	São Paulo	Bebedouro
	Goal		Goal

June 23 Taça do Atlântico	Nacional (Uruguay)	0–1	(Brazil) São Paulo	Montevideo
			Goal	Stadium: Estadio Centenario

June 27 International	São Paulo (Brazil)	2–0	(Portugal) Porto	São Paulo
	Goal			Stadium: Estádio Municipal Paulo Machado de Carvalho (Pacaembu)

June 30 Taça do Atlântico	São Paulo (Brazil)	3–1	(Brazil) America-RJ	São Paulo
	Goal		Goal	Stadium: Estádio Municipal Paulo Machado de Carvalho (Pacaembu)

July 7 Taça do Atlântico	Corinthians (Brazil)	2–0	(Brazil) São Paulo	São Paulo
	Goal			Stadium: Estádio Municipal Paulo Machado de Carvalho (Pacaembu)

July 22 National	Botafogo-SP	3–2	São Paulo	Ribeirão Preto
	Goal		Goal

August 5 National	Bragantino	1–2	São Paulo	Bragança Paulista
	Goal		Goal

September 2 Troféu Dantas de Freitas	Arapongas	1–4	São Paulo	Arapongas
	Goal		Goal

September 7 National	Ferroviária	0–3	São Paulo	Botucatu
			Goal

November 15 National	Londrina	3–2	São Paulo	Londrina
	Goal		Goal

== Official competitions ==
=== Campeonato Paulista ===
June 13 Seletive 1	São Paulo	3–2	São Bento (São Caetano do Sul)	São Paulo
	Goal		Goal	Stadium: Estádio Municipal Paulo Machado de Carvalho (Pacaembu)

July 14 Seletive 2	São Paulo	7–2	Noroeste	São Paulo
	Goal		Goal	Stadium: Estádio Municipal Paulo Machado de Carvalho (Pacaembu)

July 18 Seletive 3	São Paulo	2–2	Ponte Preta	São Paulo
	Goal		Goal	Stadium: Estádio Municipal Paulo Machado de Carvalho (Pacaembu)

July 21 Seletive 4	São Paulo	5–1	Guarani	São Paulo
	Goal		Goal	Stadium: Estádio Municipal Paulo Machado de Carvalho (Pacaembu)

July 24 Seletive 5	São Paulo	4–0	XV de Jaú	São Paulo
	Goal			Stadium: Estádio Municipal Paulo Machado de Carvalho (Pacaembu)

July 29 Seletive 6	São Paulo	3–0	Taubaté	São Paulo
	Goal			Stadium: Estádio Municipal Paulo Machado de Carvalho (Pacaembu)

August 2 Seletive 7	São Paulo	4–1	XV de Piracicaba	São Paulo
	Goal		Goal	Stadium: Estádio Municipal Paulo Machado de Carvalho (Pacaembu)

August 12 Seletive 8	Santos	1–0	São Paulo	Santos
	Goal			Stadium: Estádio Urbano Caldeira (Vila Belmiro)

August 15 Seletive 9	São Paulo	4–1	Nacional	São Paulo
	Goal		Goal	Stadium: Estádio Municipal Paulo Machado de Carvalho (Pacaembu)

August 18 Seletive 10	São Paulo	5–1	Portuguesa Santista	São Paulo
	Goal		Goal	Stadium: Estádio Municipal Paulo Machado de Carvalho (Pacaembu)

August 26 Seletive 11	Portuguesa	3–2	São Paulo	São Paulo
	Goal		Goal	Stadium: Estádio Municipal Paulo Machado de Carvalho (Pacaembu)

September 9 Seletive 12	Linense	1–4	São Paulo	Lins
	Goal		Goal	Stadium: Gigante de Madeira

September 16 Seletive 13	Corinthians	4–3	São Paulo	São Paulo
	Goal		Goal	Stadium: Estádio Municipal Paulo Machado de Carvalho (Pacaembu)

September 19 Seletive 14	São Paulo	3–1	Ferroviária	São Paulo
	Goal		Goal	Stadium: Estádio Municipal Paulo Machado de Carvalho (Pacaembu)

September 22 Seletive 15	São Paulo	2–1	Juventus	São Paulo
	Goal		Goal	Stadium: Estádio Municipal Paulo Machado de Carvalho (Pacaembu)

September 25 Seletive 16	São Paulo	2–3	Jabaquara	São Paulo
	Goal		Goal	Stadium: Estádio Municipal Paulo Machado de Carvalho (Pacaembu)

September 30 Seletive 17	São Paulo	3–0	Palmeiras	São Paulo
	Goal			Stadium: Estádio Municipal Paulo Machado de Carvalho (Pacaembu)

October 3 1	São Paulo	4–2	Taubaté	São Paulo
	Goal		Goal	Stadium: Estádio Palestra Itália (Parque Antártica)

October 7 2	São Bento (São Caetano do Sul)	1–4	São Paulo	São Caetano do Sul
	Goal		Goal	Stadium: Anacleto Campanella

October 11 3	São Paulo	5–0	XV de Jaú	São Paulo
	Goal			Stadium: Estádio Municipal Paulo Machado de Carvalho (Pacaembu)

October 14 4	São Paulo	2–0	Portuguesa	São Paulo
	Goal			Stadium: Estádio Municipal Paulo Machado de Carvalho (Pacaembu)

October 20 5	Corinthians	1–1	São Paulo	São Paulo
	Goal		Goal	Stadium: Estádio Municipal Paulo Machado de Carvalho (Pacaembu)

October 25 6	São Paulo	3–0	Juventus	São Paulo
	Goal			Stadium: Estádio Municipal Paulo Machado de Carvalho (Pacaembu)

October 28 7	Santos	2–0	São Paulo	São Paulo
	Goal			Stadium: Estádio Municipal Paulo Machado de Carvalho (Pacaembu)

November 4 8	XV de Piracicaba	2–5	São Paulo	Piracicaba
	Goal		Goal	Stadium: Campo da Rua Regente Feijó

November 10 9	Palmeiras	0–5	São Paulo	São Paulo
			Goal	Stadium: Estádio Municipal Paulo Machado de Carvalho (Pacaembu)

November 22 10	São Paulo	3–2	Juventus	São Paulo
	Goal		Goal	Stadium: Estádio Municipal Paulo Machado de Carvalho (Pacaembu)

November 25 11	XV de Jaú	1–5	São Paulo	Jaú
	Goal		Goal	Stadium: Artur Simões

December 1 12	Corinthians	2–2	São Paulo	São Paulo
	Goal		Goal	Stadium: Estádio Municipal Paulo Machado de Carvalho (Pacaembu)

December 5 13	São Paulo	1–1	São Bento (São Caetano do Sul)	São Paulo
	Goal		Goal	Stadium: Estádio Municipal Paulo Machado de Carvalho (Pacaembu)

December 9 14	Santos	1–3	São Paulo	Santos
	Goal		Goal	Stadium: Estádio Urbano Caldeira (Vila Belmiro)

December 12 15	São Paulo	3–0	XV de Piracicaba	São Paulo
	Goal			Stadium: Estádio Municipal Paulo Machado de Carvalho (Pacaembu)

December 16 16	Taubaté	1–3	São Paulo	Taubaté
	Goal		Goal	Stadium: Campo do Bosque

December 23 17	Portuguesa	2–2	São Paulo	São Paulo
	Goal		Goal	Stadium: Estádio Municipal Paulo Machado de Carvalho (Pacaembu)

December 27 18	São Paulo	5–3	Palmeiras	São Paulo
	Goal		Goal	Stadium: Estádio Municipal Paulo Machado de Carvalho (Pacaembu)

January 3, 1957 Tiebreaker match	São Paulo	2–4	Santos	São Paulo
	Goal		Goal	Stadium: Estádio Municipal Paulo Machado de Carvalho (Pacaembu)

==== Record ====
Final position	Points	Matches	Wins	Draws	Losses	Goals for	Goals away	Win%
2nd	45	36	25	5	6	114	49	74%
