= Carlos Alberto (footballer, born 1953) =

Brazilian footballer

Personal information
- Full name: Carlos Alberto Sotelho de Souza
- Date of birth: 19 June 1953 (age 73)
- Place of birth: Rio de Janeiro, Brazil
- Height: 1.72 m (5 ft 8 in)
- Position: Right back

Youth career
- Bonsucesso

Senior career*
Years	Team	Apps	(Gls)
1972–1976	Bonsucesso		
1977–1978	Vitória-ES		
1978–1979	Joinville		
1980–1983	Flamengo	102	(1)
1984–1985	Cruzeiro	95	(0)
1986	Portuguesa		
1986	Londrina		

Managerial career
- 2018: Nova Cidade
- * Club domestic league appearances and goals as of 19 January 2024

Carlos Alberto Sotelho de Souza (born 19 June 1953), simply known as Carlos Alberto, is a Brazilian former professional footballer and manager who played as a right back.

== Career ==
Right back with extreme versatility, he made history for Joinville and Flamengo. He scored a single goal for the club, in the semi-final of the 1980 Campeonato Brasileiro Série A against Coritiba, which enabled them to win the title that year. He also made 95 appearances for Cruzeiro.

Carlos Alberto currently works in the youth sectors of Nova Iguaçu.

== Honours ==
Joinville

- Campeonato Catarinense: 1978, 1979

Flamengo

- Intercontinental Cup: 1981
- Copa Libertadores: 1981
- Campeonato Brasileiro: 1980, 1982, 1983
- Campeonato Carioca: 1981
- Taça Guanabara: 1980, 1981, 1982
- Ramón de Carranza Trophy: 1980
