= Martín Alarcón =

Argentine footballer (1928–1988)

- Alarcón in the jersey of America FC, 1955

Personal information
- Full name: Martín Carlos Alarcón
- Date of birth: 25 December 1928
- Place of birth: Formosa, Argentina
- Date of death: 30 November 1988 (aged 59)
- Position: Forward

Senior career*
Years	Team	Apps	(Gls)
1945-1947	Sportivo Patria		
1948-1950	Libertad		
1951	River Plate	1	(0)
1952-1953	Libertad		
1954-1959	América	91	(37)
1960-1962	Millonarios		
- * Club domestic league appearances and goals

Martín Carlos Alarcón (25 December 1928 – 30 November 1988), often referred to as Alarcón, was an Argentine association football player.

== Career ==
It is reported that the short, skillful and very speedy attacker began his career in 1945 at the lowly Sportivo Patria in his hometown. Several years later, the Paraguay national team coach Manuel Fleitas Solich helped him to get contracted with Libertad in the capital, Asunción.

In 1951, he returned to Argentina to play for the top club River Plate in Buenos Aires, where he had little success competing with players like Angel Labruna, Felix Loustau and Walter Gomez for an attacker position. Thus, in 1952, he took the opportunity to play again for Libertad. After competing unsuccessfully in the Copa Rio of 1952, Libertad became runner-up in the national championship. In 1953, Libertad became runner-up in the championship, and players from the club made up the majority of the Paraguay national team that, in the same year, won the South American Championship for the first time.

In 1954, Martín Alarcón moved to Brazil, where he joined America-RJ in Rio de Janeiro, coached by Martim Francisco, credited with introducing the 4-2-4-system in Brazil. Alongside players like Canário, who would later transfer to Real Madrid, and Manoel Pereira – known as Leônidas da Selva, or "Jungle Leônidas", due to his "raw" skills and resemblance to Leônidas da Silva, Alarcón was the 1954 and 1955 Championship of Rio de Janeiro runner-up, on both occasions losing the title to Flamengo. In a best-of-three series for the 1955 title, America lost the first match to Flamengo 0–1 and won the second one 5–1. In the decisive match on 6 April 1956 at Maracanã Stadium, before almost 140,000 spectators, a record crowd for America, Alarcón had to leave the field early in the first half after a tackle by Flamengo defender Tomires. Substitutions were not allowed then, and the match balance swung to Flamengo, coached by Fleitas Solich, who eventually won 4–1, thus attaining its third consecutive title.

Alarcón, sometimes considered the top player of this era in America, had two more good years with the club in 1956 and 1957. In the latter year, he scored 14 goals in the Rio-Championship, his highest tally ever. However, America had to make do with the 5th and 6th places. From mid-1958 forward, Alarcón received little, if any, playing time. Eventually, in the early 1960s, when America would win its seventh and hitherto last Rio-Championship, Alarcón left the club.

In January 1960, he joined Millonarios in the Colombian capital, Bogotá. With the club, he won the championships under the legendary coach Gabriel Ochoa Uribe in 1961 and 1962.

== Personal life and death ==
Martín Carlos Alarcón was born in Formosa, Argentina, on 25 December 1928. He died on 30 November 1988, at the age of 59.

== Honours ==
- Championship of Colombia: 1961, 1962.
- Runner-up of the Championship of Paraguay: 1952, 1953.
- Runner-up of the Championship of Rio de Janeiro: 1954, 1955.
