= 1979 Campeonato Paulista =

Campeonato Paulista – Série A1
- Season: 1979
- Champions: Corinthians
- Relegated: Velo Clube
- Copa Brasil: Corinthians; Ponte Preta; Palmeiras; Guarani; Santos; São Paulo; Portuguesa
- Taça de Prata: América; Inter de Limeira; Noroeste; XV de Piracicaba; Botafogo; Ferroviária; Juventus; Comercial
- Matches: 416
- Goals: 815 (1.96 per match)
- Top goalscorer: Luís Fernando (América) – 27 goals
- Biggest home win: Corinthians 5-0 Juventus (July 28, 1979); Noroeste 5-0 Inter de Limeira (July 29, 1979); Guarani 5-0 Santos (August 1, 1979)
- Biggest away win: Inter de Limeira 0-4 América (July 18, 1979); XV de Piracicaba 0-4 Guarani (October 7, 1979)
- Highest scoring: América 5-2 Comercial (September 5, 1979)

The 1979 Campeonato Paulista da Divisão Especial de Futebol Profissional was the 78th season of São Paulo's top professional football league. América's Luís Fernando was the top scorer with 27 goals. Corinthians won the championship by the 17th time. Velo Clube was relegated.

== Championship ==
The twenty teams of the championship were divided into four groups of five teams, with each team playing twice against all other teams, and the three best teams of each group passing to the Second phase, and the team with the fewest points out of all the twenty being relegated, while the team with the second-fewest points would dispute a playoff against the runner-up of the Second level.

In the second phase, the twelve remaining teams would be divided into two groups of six, each team playing once against the teams of its own group and the two best teams of each group qualifying to the Semifinals.

=== First phase ===
==== Série A ====
Pos	Team	Pld	W	D	L	GF	GA	GD	Pts	Qualification or relegation
1	Corinthians	38	15	17	6	48	28	+20	47	Qualified
2	América	39	16	16	7	40	26	+14	48	Qualified
3	Botafogo	38	13	14	11	32	32	0	40	Qualified
4	Francana	38	9	16	13	31	42	−11	34	
5	São Bento	38	10	12	16	36	46	−10	32	

Updated to match(es) played on November 4, 1979. Source: RSSSF.com
Rules for classification: 1) points; 2) wins; 3) goal difference; 4) number of goals scored.

==== Série B ====
Pos	Team	Pld	W	D	L	GF	GA	GD	Pts	Qualification or relegation
1	Guarani	38	18	11	9	55	26	+29	47	Qualified
2	Santos	38	15	14	9	48	37	+11	44	Qualified
3	Portuguesa	38	11	18	9	43	35	+8	40	Qualified
4	Inter de Limeira	38	12	15	11	36	46	−10	39	
5	Comercial	38	13	12	13	35	38	−3	38	

Updated to match(es) played on November 4, 1979. Source: RSSSF.com
Rules for classification: 1) points; 2) wins; 3) goal difference; 4) number of goals scored.

==== Série C ====
Pos	Team	Pld	W	D	L	GF	GA	GD	Pts	Qualification or relegation
1	São Paulo	38	15	13	10	42	33	+9	43	Qualified
2	Ponte Preta	38	10	19	9	32	27	+5	39	Qualified
3	Ferroviária	38	10	17	11	27	33	−6	37	Qualified
4	XV de Piracicaba	38	12	8	18	32	48	−16	32	
5	Velo Clube	38	5	11	22	22	52	−30	21	Relegated

Updated to match(es) played on November 4, 1979. Source: RSSSF.com
Rules for classification: 1) points; 2) wins; 3) goal difference; 4) number of goals scored.

==== Série D ====
Pos	Team	Pld	W	D	L	GF	GA	GD	Pts	Qualification or relegation
1	Palmeiras	38	20	12	6	60	30	+30	52	Qualified
2	Juventus	38	13	9	16	33	43	−10	35	Qualified
3	Noroeste	38	7	21	10	29	30	−1	35	Qualified
4	XV de Jaú	38	7	17	14	33	45	−12	31	
5	Marília	38	7	14	17	25	42	−17	28	Relegation Playoff

Updated to match(es) played on November 4, 1979. Source: RSSSF.com
Rules for classification: 1) points; 2) wins; 3) goal difference; 4) number of goals scored.

==== Relegation Playoffs ====
Team 1	Series	Team 2	Game 1	Game 2	Game 3
Marília	4–2	Santo André	2–0	1–2	4–1

=== Second phase ===
==== Group 1 ====
Pos	Team	Pld	W	D	L	GF	GA	GD	Pts	Qualification or relegation
1	Ponte Preta	5	4	0	1	7	2	+5	8	Qualified
2	Corinthians	5	3	1	1	5	2	+3	7	Qualified
3	Ferroviária	5	2	3	0	6	4	+2	7	
4	São Paulo	5	1	2	2	4	5	−1	4	
5	América	5	1	0	4	3	7	−4	2	
6	Botafogo	5	0	2	3	1	6	−5	2	

Updated to match(es) played on November 22, 1979. Source: RSSSF.com
Rules for classification: 1) points; 2) wins; 3) goal difference; 4) number of goals scored.

==== Group 2 ====
Pos	Team	Pld	W	D	L	GF	GA	GD	Pts	Qualification or relegation
1	Palmeiras	5	4	1	0	13	2	+11	9	Qualified
2	Guarani	5	2	1	2	5	5	0	5	Qualified
3	Juventus	5	1	3	1	5	5	0	5	
4	Santos	5	1	2	2	7	8	−1	4	
5	Portuguesa	5	1	2	2	7	12	−5	4	
6	Noroeste	5	1	1	3	3	8	−5	3	

Updated to match(es) played on November 22, 1979. Source: RSSSF.com
Rules for classification: 1) points; 2) wins; 3) goal difference; 4) number of goals scored.

=== Semifinals ===
Team 1	Agg.	Team 2	1st leg	2nd leg
Corinthians	2–1	Palmeiras	1–1	1–0
Ponte Preta	3–1	Guarani	2–1	1–0

=== Finals ===
Team 1	Series	Team 2	Game 1	Game 2	Game 3
Corinthians	3–0	Ponte Preta	1–0	0–0	2-0
