= Luís Freire (Brazilian footballer) =

Brazilian footballer

Personal information
- Full name: Luís Arnoldo Ellwanger Freire
- Date of birth: 10 November 1952 (age 73)
- Place of birth: Carazinho, Brazil
- Height: 1.79 m (5 ft 10 in)
- Position: Attacking midfielder

Senior career*
Years	Team	Apps	(Gls)
1971–1973	Gaúcho		
1974–1976	Grêmio	43	(6)
1977	Esportivo		
1977–1978	Caxias		
1979–1980	Coritiba		
1981–1983	Criciúma		
1984	Aimoré		
1984–1985	Internacional		
1986	Coritiba		
1987	Pelotas		
1987	EC São Bernardo		
1988–1990	Passo Fundo		
1990	Ypiranga-RS		
1990	Gaúcho		
1991	Passo Fundo		

Managerial career
- 2007: Santo Ângelo
- * Club domestic league appearances and goals as of 20 March 2024

Luís Arnoldo Ellwanger Freire (born 10 November 1952), simply known as Luis Freire, is a Brazilian former professional footballer who played as an attacking midfielder.

== Career ==
An attacking midfielder with great finishing ability, Luís Freire had great spells, especially at Grêmio, Gaúcho de Passo Fundo, Caxias, Coritiba and Esportivo, where he was the state's top scorer in 1977. In 1980 he had a historic performance in a match against CR Flamengo, where he scored a goal.

== Honours ==
Coritiba

- Campeonato Paranaense: 1979

Individual

- 1977 Campeonato Gaúcho top scorer: 13 goals
- 1979 Campeonato Paranaense top scorer: 19 goals
- 1980 Campeonato Brasileiro Série A most beautiful goal
