= Ílton Vaccari =

Brazilian footballer (1934–2019)

Personal information
- Full name: Ílton Celestino Vaccari
- Date of birth: 25 October 1934
- Place of birth: Rio de Janeiro, Brazil
- Date of death: 24 July 2019 (aged 84)
- Place of death: Maricá, Rio de Janeiro, Brazil
- Positions: Defender; midfielder

Senior career*
Years	Team	Apps	(Gls)
1951-1957	Bangu		
1958-1960	America-RJ		
1960-1965	Guarani Campinas		

International career
1956–1963	Brazil	9	(1)
- * Club domestic league appearances and goals

Ílton Vaccari (25 October 1934 – 24 July 2019) nicknamed Ílton Porco, was a Brazilian footballer. He played in nine matches for the Brazil national football team from 1956 to 1963. He was also part of Brazil's squad for the 1963 South American Championship. Vaccari died on 24 July 2019, at the age of 84.
