= Ubirajara Motta =

Brazilian footballer (1936–2021)

Personal information
- Full name: Ubirajara Gonçalves Motta
- Date of birth: 4 September 1936
- Place of birth: Rio de Janeiro, Brazil
- Date of death: 24 October 2021 (aged 85)
- Place of death: Rio de Janeiro, Brazil
- Position: Goalkeeper

Senior career*
Years	Team	Apps	(Gls)
1955–1967	Bangu	534	(0)
1967	→ Houston Stars (loan)		
1968–1971	Botafogo		
1972–1977	Flamengo	45	(0)

International career
1966	Brazil	1	(0)
- * Club domestic league appearances and goals

Ubirajara Gonçalves Motta (4 September 1936 – 24 October 2021), better known as Ubirajara Motta (or Ubirajara Mota), was a Brazilian professional footballer who played as a goalkeeper.

== Club career ==
Ubirajara Motta played for Bangu AC for most of his career. In 1967 he was loaned to the newly created Houston Stars of the United States. He also played for Botafogo and Flamengo, being champion for both clubs.

In the final of the 1971 Campeonato Carioca, he was mistakenly pushed by Marco Antonio of Fluminense, in the Lula's goal, which gave Fluminense the title of that season.

== International career ==
Ubirajara Motta played one match for the Brazil national team, appearing in a friendly on 8 June 1966 at the Maracanã Stadium against Peru.

== Honours ==
Bangu

- Campeonato Carioca: 1966
- Copa dos Campeões Estaduais: 1967
- International Soccer League: 1960

Botafogo

- Taça Brasil: 1968
- Campeonato Carioca: 1968
- Taça Guanabara: 1968

Flamengo

- Campeonato Carioca: 1972, 1974
- Taça Guanabara: 1972, 1973
- Torneio do Povo: 1972

== Death ==
Ubirajara died in his apartment in the Tijuca neighborhood, in Rio de Janeiro, at the age of 85.
