= Tião (footballer, born 1941) =

Brazilian footballer

Personal information
- Full name: Sebastião Rocha
- Date of birth: 14 September 1941
- Place of birth: Rio de Janeiro, Brazil
- Date of death: 12 April 1984 (aged 42)
- Place of death: Rio de Janeiro, Brazil
- Height: 1.70 m (5 ft 7 in)
- Position: Left winger

Youth career
- Flamengo

Senior career*
Years	Team	Apps	(Gls)
1961–1962	Cruzeiro		
1962–1965	Siderúrgica		
1965	Flamengo	4	(0)
1965–1966	Vasco da Gama		
1966	Siderúrgica		
1966–1972	Atlético Mineiro	283	(32)
1972–1974	América Mineiro	32	(2)

International career
1968	Brazil	1	(0)
- * Club domestic league appearances and goals as of 9 March 2024

Sebastião Rocha (14 September 1941 – 12 April 1984), better known as Tião, was a Brazilian professional footballer who played as a left winger.

== Career ==
Born in the Botafogo neighborhood, Rio de Janeiro, Tião began his career in Flamengo's youth sectors. Slight, even abandoned football when in 1961 he was invited by a Cruzeiro director to restart his career. He played little for Cruzeiro, being transferred to EC Siderúrgica de Sabará, where in 1964, he was part of the state champion squad. He returned to Rio de Janeiro with Flamengo, but again, little used, he quickly ended up moving to Vasco. At the end of 1966 he was hired by Atlético Mineiro, where he was Brazilian champion in 1971. He ended his career at América Mineiro in 1974.

Also played a match for the Brazil national team, against Yugoslavia in 1968.

== Honours ==
Siderúrgica

- Campeonato Mineiro: 1964

Vasco da Gama

- Torneio Rio-São Paulo: 1966 (shared)

Atlético Mineiro

- Campeonato Brasileiro: 1971
- Campeonato Mineiro: 1970

== Death ==
Tião died murdered in the city of Rio de Janeiro, on 12 April 1984.
