= Ferreira (footballer, born 1933) =

Brazilian footballer (1933–2004)

Personal information
- Full name: Antenor Ferreira de Carvalho Filho
- Date of birth: 1 November 1933
- Place of birth: Três Rios, Brazil
- Date of death: 2004 (aged 70–71)
- Place of death: Brazil
- Position: Forward

Youth career
- Colônia (Três Rios)

Senior career*
| Years | Team | Apps | (Gls) |
| 1951–1958 | America-RJ | | |
| 1959–1960 | Real Murcia | 14 | (1) |
| 1961 | Castellón | 6 | (0) |
| 1961–1962 | Corinthians | 9 | (0) |

International career
| 1956 | Brazil | 5 | (4) |
- * Club domestic league appearances and goals

Antenor Ferreira de Carvalho Filho (1 November 1933 – 2004), simply known as Ferreira, was a Brazilian professional footballer who played as a forward.

== Career ==
Fast and a great finisher, Ferreira started his youth career at Colônia, a team from his hometown Três Rios. In 1951 he joined America-RJ, a team he defended for almost the entire 1950s, being part of the state runner-up squad in 1955. Due to his good performance he joined the Brazil national team, where he played in the Taça Oswaldo Cruz and the Taça do Atlântico, making five appearances and scoring four goals. He later played Spanish football for Real Murcia and Castellón, and ended his career at Corinthians in 1962.

== Honours ==
Brazil

- Taça Oswaldo Cruz: 1956
- Taça do Atlântico: 1956
