= 1966 Campeonato Carioca =

Season of Carioca Championship

Campeonato Carioca
- Season: 1966
- Champions: Bangu
- Taça Brasil: Fluminense
- Matches played: 94
- Goals scored: 263 (2.8 per match)
- Top goalscorer: Paulo Borges (Bangu) - 16 goals
- Biggest home win: Flamengo 5-1 Olaria (September 27, 1966); Flamengo 4-0 São Cristóvão (October 2, 1966)
- Biggest away win: São Cristóvão 0-7 América (October 23, 1966)
- Highest scoring: América 3-6 Fluminense (December 17, 1966)

The 1966 edition of the Campeonato Carioca kicked off on September 11, 1966 and ended on December 18, 1966. It was organized by FCF (Federação Carioca de Futebol, or Carioca Football Federation). Twelve teams participated. Bangu won the title for the second time. no teams were relegated.

== System ==
The tournament would be divided in two stages:

- First round: The twelve teams all played in a single round-robin format against each other. The eight best teams in each group qualified to the Second round.
- Second round: The remaining eight teams all played in a single round-robin format against each other. The team with the most points won the title.

== Championship ==
=== First round ===
Pos	Team	Pld	W	D	L	GF	GA	GD	Pts	Qualification or relegation
1	Flamengo	11	8	3	0	22	7	+15	19	Qualified
2	Bangu	11	8	2	1	28	4	+24	18	Qualified
3	Fluminense	11	9	0	2	19	7	+12	18	Qualified
4	Botafogo	11	6	3	2	13	8	+5	15	Qualified
5	América	11	6	2	3	24	15	+9	14	Qualified
6	Vasco da Gama	11	5	2	4	16	11	+5	12	Qualified
7	Bonsucesso	11	3	3	5	14	17	−3	9	Qualified
8	Olaria	11	4	1	6	10	20	−10	9	Qualified
9	Portuguesa	11	4	0	7	12	15	−3	8	
10	Campo Grande	11	3	0	8	7	15	−8	6	
11	São Cristóvão	11	1	1	9	3	28	−25	3	
12	Madureira	11	0	1	10	11	32	−21	1	

Updated to match(es) played on October 30, 1966. Source: RSSSF.com
Rules for classification: 1) points; 2) goal difference; 3) wins; 4) number of goals scored.

=== Second round ===
Pos	Team	Pld	W	D	L	GF	GA	GD	Pts	Qualification or relegation
1	Bangu	7	7	0	0	22	4	+18	14	Champions
2	Flamengo	7	4	2	1	9	5	+4	10	
3	Fluminense	7	3	2	2	15	11	+4	8	
4	Botafogo	7	3	2	2	8	6	+2	8	
5	Vasco da Gama	7	3	1	3	7	11	−4	7	
6	América	7	2	0	5	12	18	−6	4	
7	Olaria	7	1	1	5	8	17	−9	3	
8	Bonsucesso	7	1	0	6	3	12	−9	2	

Updated to match(es) played on December 17, 1966. Source: RSSSF.com
Rules for classification: 1) points; 2) goal difference; 3) goal average; 4) wins.

== Taça Guanabara ==
Pos	Team	Pld	W	D	L	GF	GA	GD	Pts	Qualification or relegation
1	Fluminense	5	2	3	0	6	2	+4	7	Playoffs
2	Flamengo	5	2	3	0	7	5	+2	7	Playoffs
3	Botafogo	5	2	2	1	5	1	+4	6	
4	Bangu	5	2	1	2	7	6	+1	5	
5	Vasco da Gama	5	1	1	3	4	8	−4	3	
6	Bonsucesso	5	0	2	3	4	11	−7	2	

Updated to match(es) played on September 4, 1966. Source: RSSSF.com
Rules for classification: 1) points; 2) goal difference; 3) wins; 4) number of goals scored.

=== Playoffs ===
7 September 1966

Fluminense	3 – 1	Flamengo
Amoroso 30'; Mário 62', 85'	Report	Silva 70'

Maracanã, Rio de Janeiro
Attendance: 69,730
Referee: Aírton Vieira de Morais
