= Auto Esporte Clube (AM) =

Brazilian former sports club

Auto
- Full name: Auto Esporte Clube
- Nickname: Clube Motorizado "Os Choferes"
- Founded: 16 September 1950
- Dissolved: 1964
- Stadium: Parque Amazonense
- Capacity: 4,000

The Auto Esporte Clube was a Brazilian association football club in the city of Manaus, capital of the state of Amazonas. Its colors were green and yellow and it played in various sports in the state, such as football, futsal, volleyball and basketball.

== History ==
The club was founded by professional midfielders in Manaus. Although it was reported that the club was founded on September 16, 1950, as early as 1941 the club's existence was reported as playing in suburban tournaments, as in the October 5, 1941, edition of Jornal do Commercio where its participation was reported. in a commemorative competition alongside clubs that played in the state's official football such as Barés, Comercial and 13 de Maio. During 1941, news reports indicating the existence of the club became common. He held a car competition on November 16 of that year, at the General Osório stadium (belonging to the army).

The "motorized club" competed in the 2nd division until 1954, when it secured the right to enter the 1st division for the year 1955 alongside Santos, Suburbano champion. Reaching the elite, in 1955 the club did not do well but in 1956 the club brought in Cláudio Coelho, who was four-time Amazonian champion consecutively with América. The renowned sportsman brought players such as Guarda, Clemente, Juarez Souza Cruz, Brás Gioia, Hélcio Peixoto, Gordinho, Osmar, Mário Matos and Nicolau from Alvirrubro. With this entry of ex-Americans, the club came on strong and became Amazonian champion that year, as a continuation of the work that was already done in América. The 1956 Auto Esporte team debuted in a friendly game on April 8 of that year and contrary to what was expected, the start was not so good and they ended up losing 4–1 to Sul América.

- 1956 champion team: Vicente, Guarda and Gatinho; Juarez Souza Cruz (Jaime Basílio), Gilberto and Gioia; Silvio (Gildo), Gordinho, Osmar, Sadoval and Nicolau. Also playing were: Mário Matos, Anacleto, Moacir, Osmar and Ruy (goalkeepers) and Clemente. Coach: Cláudio Coelho.

=== Two-time champion in 1959 ===
The club was also two-time state champion in 1959:

- 1959 champion team: Alfredo, Valdér and Gatinho; Nonato, Almério and Guilherme; Totinha, Osmar, Gordinho, Caramuru and Manoel Conte. They also played: Chagas, Sandoval, Guarda, Claudionor, Nonato and Ronaldo. Coach: Cláudio Coelho.

=== Runner-up of 1961 ===
In 1961, Auto Esporte won the 2nd of 3 rounds, guaranteeing the right to decide the title in a Triangular Final with São Raimundo and Rio Negro (the latter now with Cláudio Coelho). In that final, Auto Esporte lost to Rio Negro 3-1 when some fans from “Clube Motorizado” invaded the field 10 minutes into the 2nd half, dissatisfied with the performance of referee José Pereira Serra. The match was suspended and resumed 4 days later, with Dorval Medeiros on the whistle. There was no change in the score and the title went to São Raimundo.

The club remained among the state's football elite until 1963, participating a total of 9 times in the first division of the Campeonato Amazonense (between 1955 and 1963).

=== Top scorers ===
The club had two top scorers in the Campeonato Amazonense: in 1959, Gordinho (Mário da Cruz Gordinho), with 25 goals (2nd place, Pratinha, from Nacional, scored 15 goals); in 1961, Nonato, with 10 goals. His biggest scorers in the championship were, in 1956: Osmar, 13 goals; in 1957: Gordinho (26 goals) and Osmar (25 goals); in 1958: Sandoval (6 goals); in 1959: Gordinho (25 goals); in 1960: Osmar (9 goals); Totinha (8 goals); in 1961: Nonato (10 goals); in 1962: Coelho (6 goals); in 1963: Torrado (12 goals).

== Honors ==
- Campeonato Amazonense: 1956, 1959
- Campeonato Amazonense de Basquetebol: 1956

== See also ==
- Campeonato Amazonense
