= Beto (footballer, born 1946) =

Brazilian footballer

Personal information
- Full name: Roberto Hermont Arantes
- Date of birth: 29 August 1946 (age 80)
- Place of birth: Itajubá, Brazil
- Height: 1.68 m (5 ft 6 in)
- Position: Midfielder

Youth career
- –1963: Nacional do Carmo
- 1963–1965: Atlético Mineiro

Senior career*
Years	Team	Apps	(Gls)
1965–1973	Atlético Mineiro	142	(29)
1969	→ Deportivo Italia (loan)		
1971	→ Deportivo Italia (loan)		

Managerial career
- 2007–2008: Atlético Mineiro (Director of Football)
- * Club domestic league appearances and goals as of 12 February 2024

Roberto Hermont Arantes (born 29 August 1946), better known as Beto or Beto Bom de Bola, is a Brazilian former professional footballer who played as a midfielder.

== Career ==
Beto began his career playing futsal for Nacional do Carmo in the city of Visconde do Rio Branco, Minas Gerais. He arrived at Atlético Mineiro in 1963 and over time migrated to field football. He played for the club in 142 matches, scoring 29 goals and participating in winning the state championship in 1970 and the Brazilian championship in 1971. He also had two loan spells with Deportivo Italia in Venezuela. Beto was called up to the Brazil national football team in 1969, but did not play in any official matches.

== Personal life ==
Beto worked as Director of Football at Atlético Mineiro from 2007 until May 2008. He was also a sports commentator for several years on TV channels in Minas Gerais.

== Honours ==
Atlético Mineiro

- Campeonato Brasileiro: 1971
- Campeonato Mineiro: 1970
- Taça Belo Horizonte: 1972
