= Olympic Club (Barbacena) =

Olympic
- Full name: Olympic Club
- Nickname(s): Furacão da Colina
- Founded: July 25, 1915
- Ground: Estádio Santa Tereza, Barbacena, Minas Gerais state, Brazil
- Capacity: 5,000
| Home colors | Away colors |

Olympic Club, commonly known as Olympic, or as Olympic de Barbacena, is a Brazilian football club based in Barbacena, Minas Gerais state.

== History ==
The club was founded on July 25, 1915. Olympic won the Campeonato Mineiro Segunda Divisão in 2004, beating Patrocinense in the final.

== Achievements ==
- Campeonato Mineiro Segunda Divisão:
  - Winners (1): 2004

== Stadium ==
Olympic Club play their home games at Estádio Santa Tereza. The stadium has a maximum capacity of 5,000 people.
