= Escurinho (footballer, born 1930) =

Brazilian footballer (1930–2020)

Personal information
- Full name: Benedito Custódio Ferreira
- Date of birth: 3 July 1930
- Place of birth: Nova Lima, Brazil
- Date of death: 12 December 2020 (aged 90)
- Positions: Attacking midfielder; left winger

Senior career*
Years	Team	Apps	(Gls)
1950–1953	Villa Nova		
1954–1964	Fluminense		
1965–1966	Atlético Junior		
1967–1969	Portuguesa (RJ)		
1970	Bonsucesso		

International career
1955–1956	Brazil	8	(0)
- * Club domestic league appearances and goals

Benedito Custódio Ferreira (3 July 1930 – 12 December 2020), nicknamed Escurinho, was a Brazilian footballer who played as an attacking midfielder and left winger.

== Career ==
Born in Nova Lima, Escurinho played for Villa Nova, Fluminense, Atlético Junior, Portuguesa (RJ) and Bonsucesso.

He made 490 appearances for Fluminense between 1954 and 1964, the fifth highest in the club's history. He also scored 110 goals. With the club he won the 1959 Carioca Championship and the 1957 and 1960 Rio-São Paulo Tournament.

He was nicknamed the "Black Arrow" due to his speed.

He earned 8 caps for the Brazil national team between 1955 and 1956.

He died on 12 November 2020 at the age of 90 from multiple organ failure. He was also suffering from Alzheimer's disease in the years leading up to his death.
