= Houston Stars =

Defunct American soccer club

- Full name: Houston Stars
- Founded: 1967
- Dissolved: 1968
- Stadium: Astrodome
- Capacity: 62,000
- Owner: Roy Mark Hofheinz
- Head coach: Martim Francisco (1967); Geza Henni (1968)
- League: United Soccer Association (1967); North American Soccer League (1968)
- 1968: 2nd of Gulf Division
Home colors	Away colors

The Houston Stars were an American professional soccer team based out of Houston, Texas. The Stars were a charter member of the United Soccer Association (USA) in 1967 and when the USA and rival National Professional Soccer League (NPSL) merged in 1968 to form the North American Soccer League (NASL), the team moved to the new league. The Stars played its home matches at the Astrodome. The team folded at the conclusion of the 1968 NASL season.

== History ==
In 1966 several groups of entrepreneurs were exploring the idea of forming a professional soccer league in United States. One of these groups, United Soccer Association (USA) led by Jack Kent Cooke, selected 12 cities for team locations and Roy Hofheinz, former Houston mayor and owner of the Houston Astros, was awarded a franchise. The USA originally planned to start play in the spring of 1968; however the rival National Professional Soccer League, which secured a TV contract from CBS, announced it was ready to launch in 1967. Not wanting to let the rival league gain an advantage, the USA decided to launch early. Not having secured any player contracts, the league imported teams from Europe, Brazil, and Uruguay to represent the franchise cities. Brazilian team Bangu Atlético Clube was brought in to play as the Stars.

The Stars opened the season at home against the Los Angeles Wolves in a 1–1 draw in front of crowd of 34,965. In their inaugural season in 1967, the Houston Stars finished fourth place with a record of 4 wins, 4 ties and 4 loss while drawing an average home league attendance of 19,802 in six games, the highest of all soccer clubs in the United States that year.

With the merger of the United Soccer Association and the National Professional Soccer League it was announced that Houston would be one of the 20 teams in play in the North American Soccer League (NASL). (Note: 17 teams contested the 1968 NASL season with three teams folding before the season began) The Stars finished the 1968 NASL season in second place of the Gulf Division Division with a record of 14 wins 12 ties and 6 loses and an average attendance of 3,246. The team folded at the conclusion of the 1968 season.

== Year-by-year ==
Year	League	W	L	T	Pts	Regular season	Playoffs
1967	USA	4	4	4	12	4th, Western Division	Did not qualify
1968	NASL	14	12	6	150	2nd, Gulf Division	Did not qualify
