= Bangu Atlético Clube =

Bangu
- Full name: Bangu Atlético Clube
- Nicknames: Luiz Carlos; Alvi-Rubro (The Red & White); O Castor (The Beaver); Time de Fábrica (The Factory Team)
- Founded: 17 April 1904; 122 years ago
- Stadium: Estádio Moça Bonita
- Capacity: 9,024
- President: Jorge Varela
- Head coach: Alfredo Sampaio
- League: Campeonato Carioca
- 2025: Carioca Série A2, 1st of 12 (champions)
- Website: www.bangu-ac.com.br
Home colours	Away colours

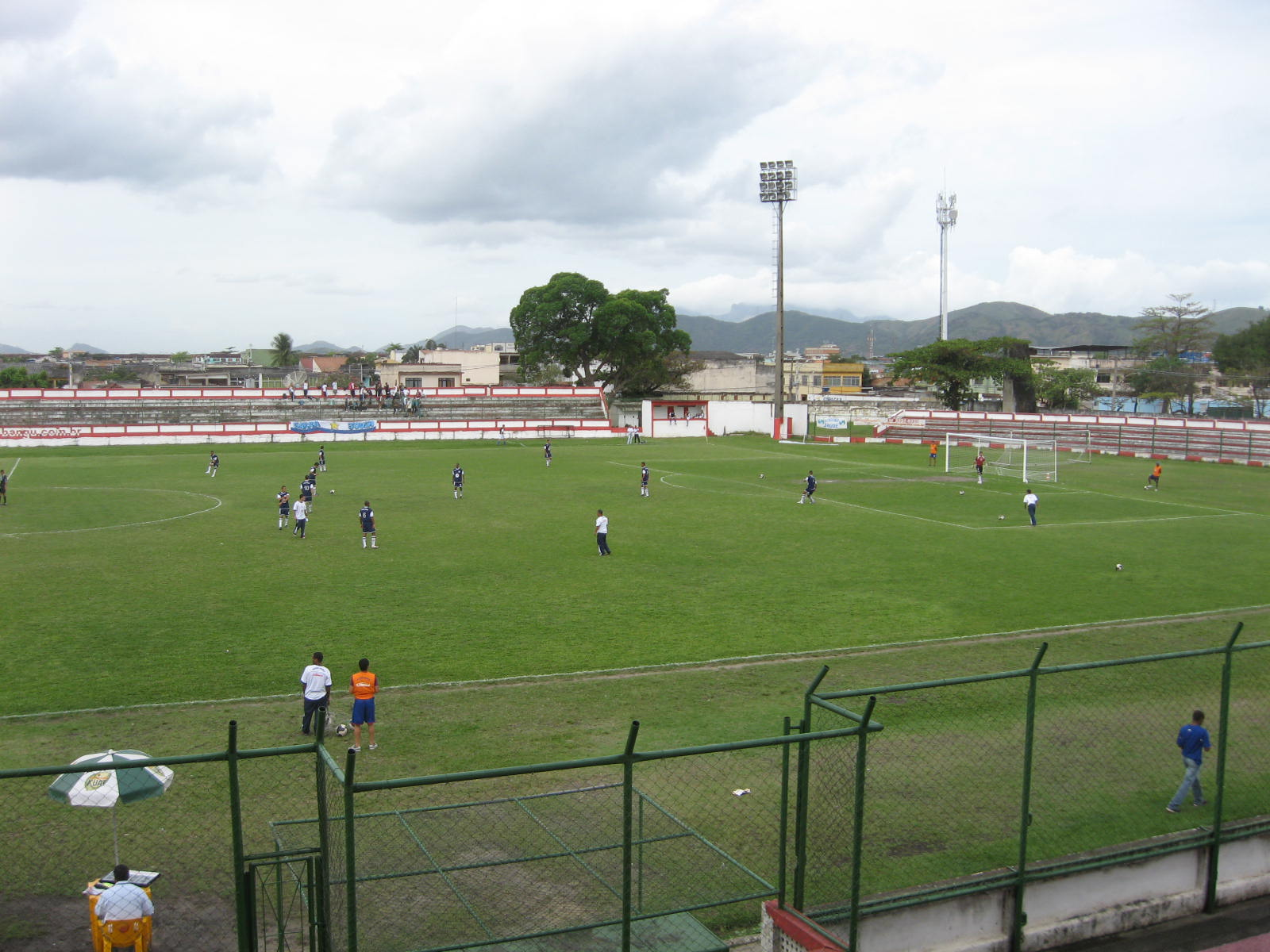
Estádio Proletário Guilherme da Silveira Filho

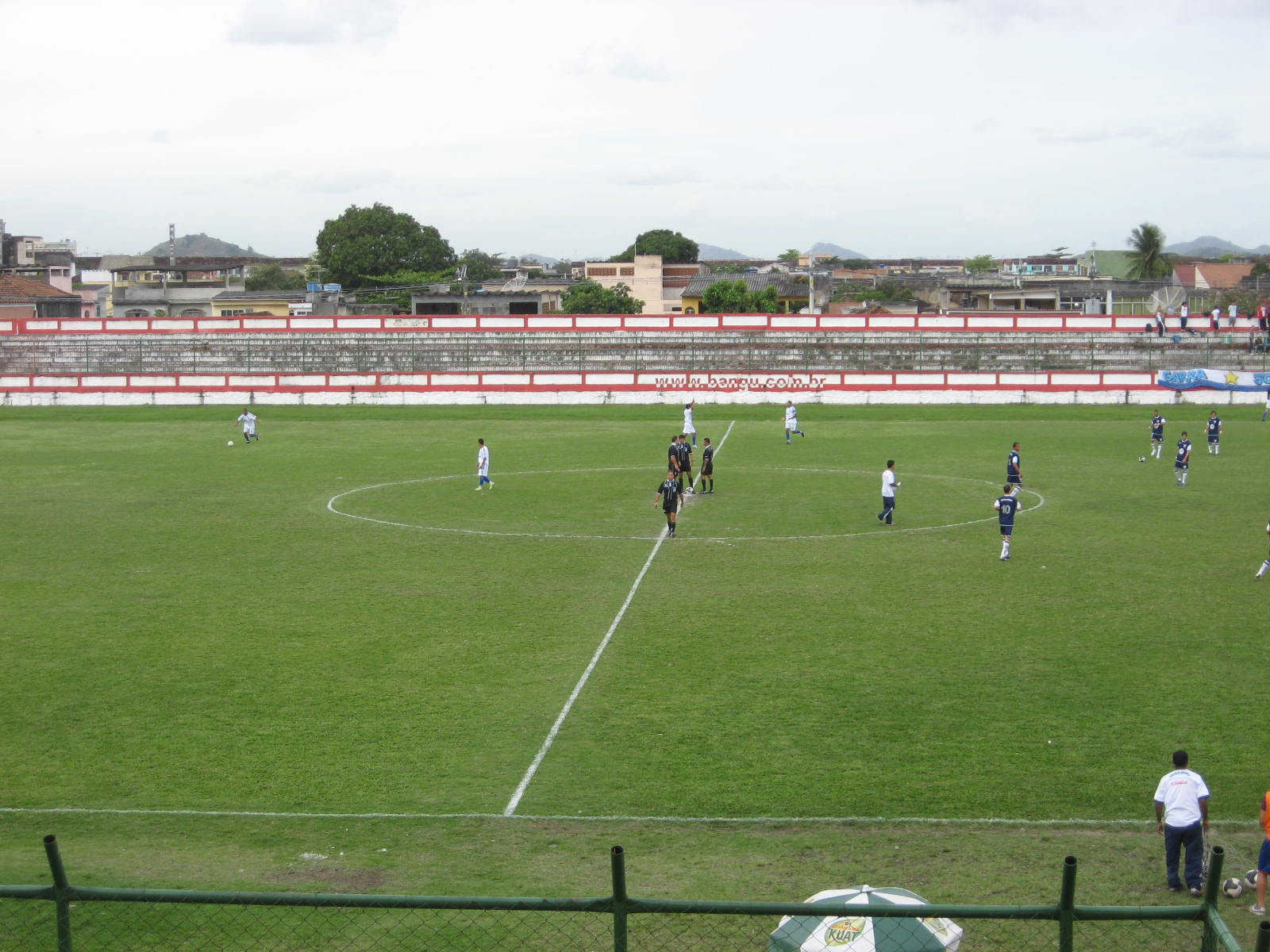
Estádio Proletário Guilherme da Silveira Filho

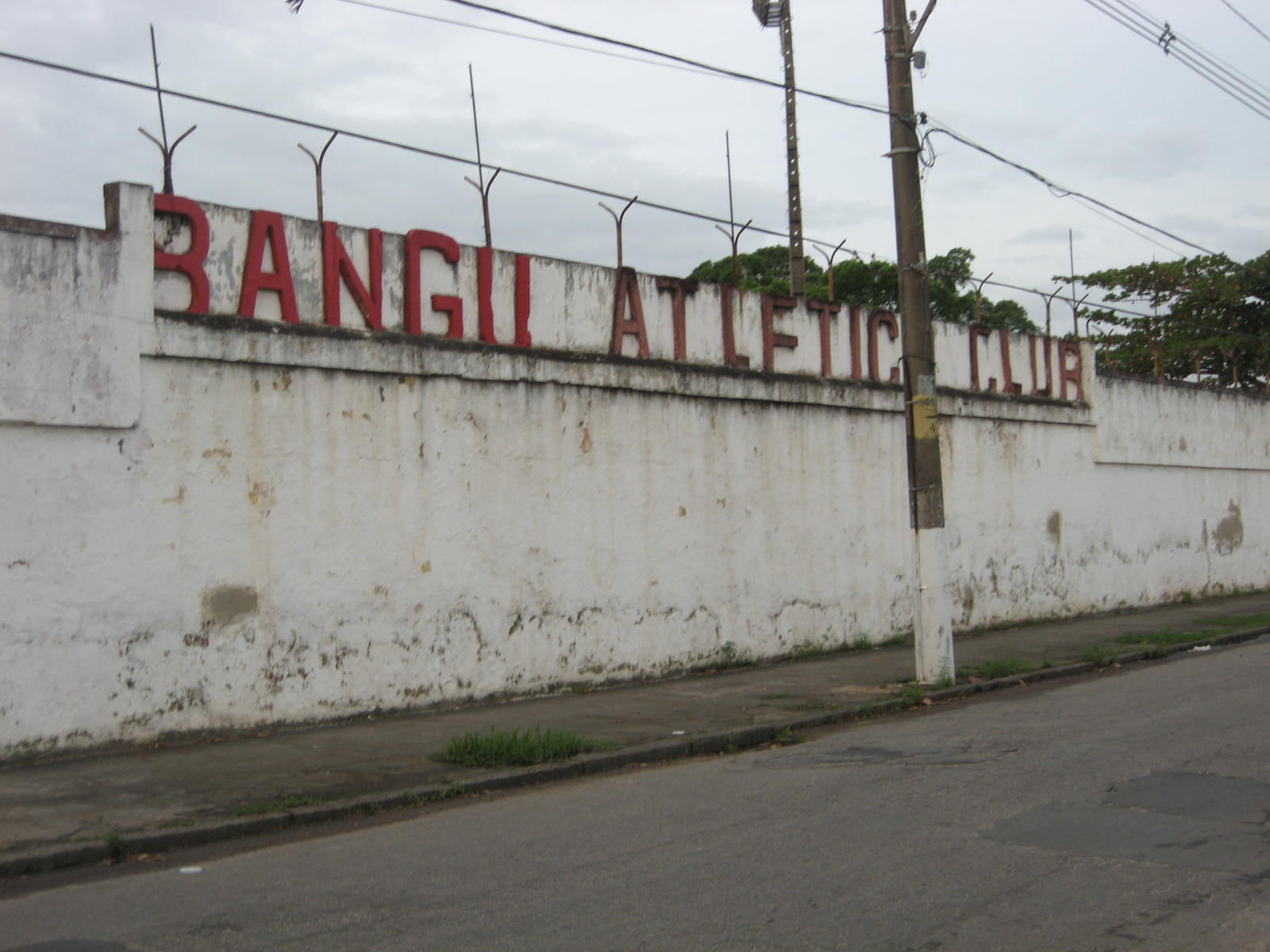
Stadium exterior

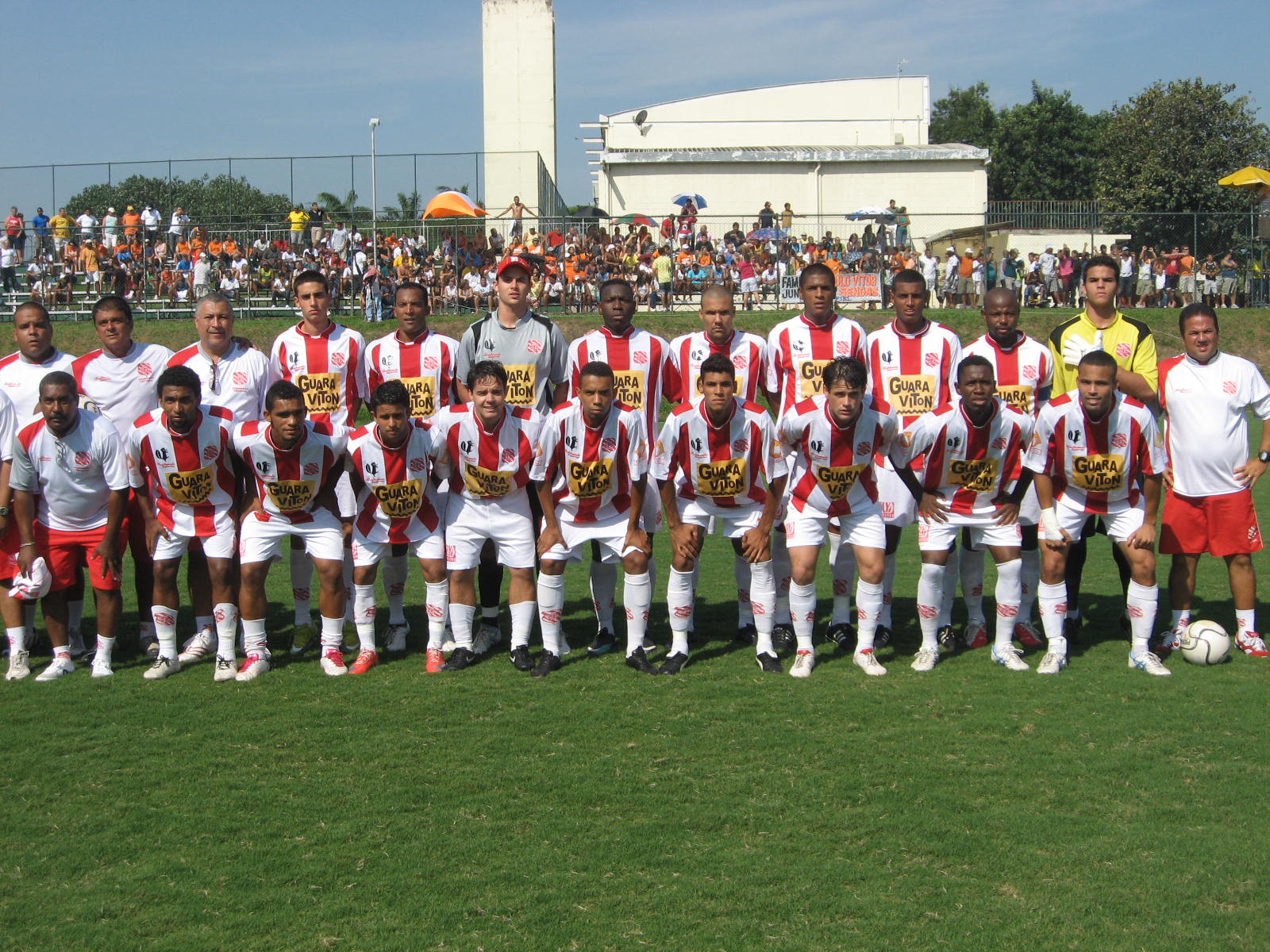
Team photo from the 2010 season

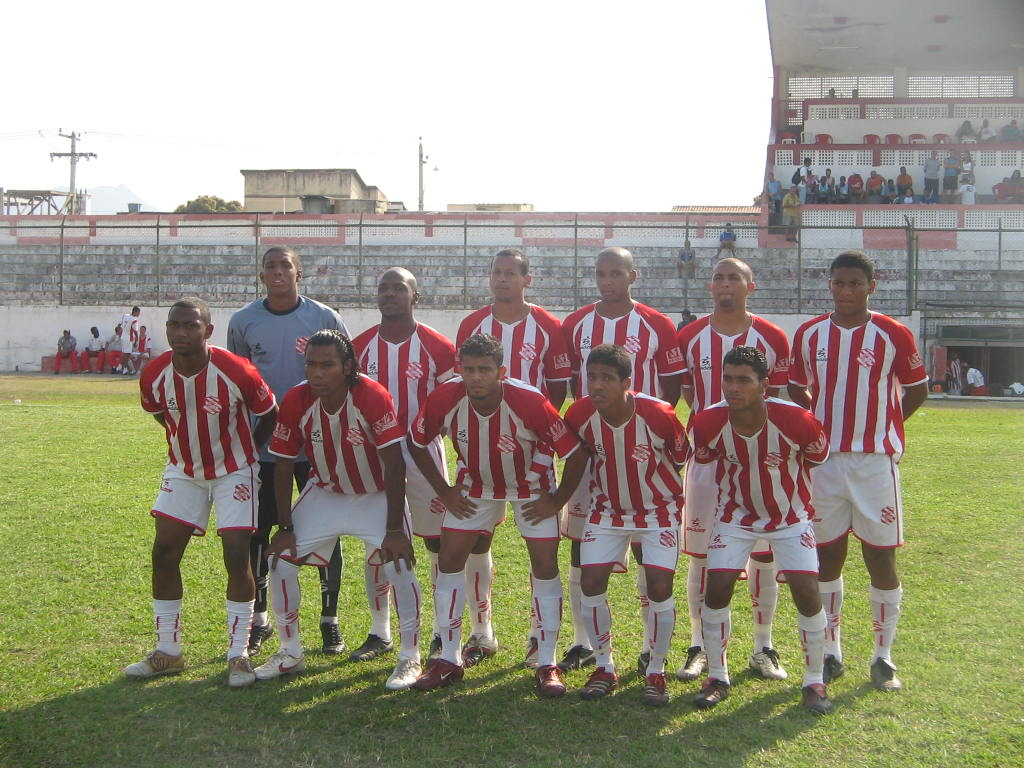
Team photo from the 2007 season

Bangu Atlético Clube, commonly known as Bangu, is a Brazilian professional association football club based in Rio de Janeiro, in the western neighbourhood of Bangu. The team plays in Série D, the fourth tier of the Brazilian football league system, as well as in the Campeonato Carioca, the top tier of the Rio de Janeiro state football league.

The club competed in the Campeonato Brasileiro Série A several times, finishing as runner-up in 1985. Their home stadium is the Estadio Moça Bonita, which has a capacity of 15,000.

== History ==
The club has its origins in Fábrica Bangu (Bangu Factory), located in Bangu neighborhood, Rio de Janeiro. Some Britons that worked at the factory, especially Thomas Donohoe, introduced football to the factory workers by bringing footballs to the place and organising the first football match in Brazil. In December 1903, Andrew Procter suggested the foundation of a club, when he realised how enthusiastic his colleagues were for football. The club was founded on 17 April 1904 as Bangu Atlético Clube. Bangu was the first football club in Brazil to feature black and mulatto players.

In 1933, Bangu won its first state championship.

In 1966, Bangu won its second state championship in a game played in the world's largest stadium filled with over 120,000 fans, the Maracana. They beat powerhouse Flamengo 3–0 in a game remembered by a big brawl caused by Flamengo's players, in which several players got ejected afterwards. In 1967, Bangu, as the Houston Stars, represented the city of Houston in the United Soccer Association. The club finished with four victories, four draws and four defeats, but led the competition's attendance, with an average of 19,000 supporters per match.

In 1985, Bangu was the runner-up of Campeonato Brasileiro, gaining the right to compete in the following year's Copa Libertadores.

In 2004, Bangu was relegated to the Campeonato Carioca Second Level, returning to the first level in 2009, after winning the 2008 second level.

== Honours ==
=== Official tournaments ===
State
Competitions	Titles	Seasons
Campeonato Carioca	2	1933, 1966
Campeonato Carioca Série A2	4	1911, 1914, 2008, 2025

=== Others tournaments ===
==== International ====
- Ecuador International Triangular Tournament (1): 1957
- Caracas Triangular Trophy (1): 1958
- Luxembourg International Triangular Tournament (1): 1958
- Costa Rica International Quadrangular Tournament (1): 1959
- International Soccer League (1): 1960
- International Triangular Tournament of Austria (1): 1961
- International Quadrangular Tournament of Ecuador (1): 1962
- President's Cup (Korea) (1): 1984
- El Salvador International Quadrangular Tournament (1): 1998
- Winter Tournament (1): 1999
- BTV Cup (1): 2015

==== National ====
- Torneio Imprensa (1): 1943
- Torneio Quadrangular do Rio de Janeiro (1): 1957
- Torneio Triangular de Porto Alegre (1): 1957
- Torneio Quadrangular do Recife (1): 1961
- Torneio Quadrangular de Belém do Pará (1): 1962
- Copa dos Campeões (1): 1967
- Torneio de Campinas (1): 1968

==== Inter-state ====
- Torneio Início do Rio-São Paulo (1): 1951

==== State ====
- Taça Rio (1): 1987
- Taça Orlando Leal Carneiro (1): 1979
- Torneio Início (4): 1934 (LCF), 1950, 1955, 1964

=== Runners-up ===
- Campeonato Brasileiro Série A (1): 1985
- Torneio Ricardo Teixeira (1): 1993
- Campeonato Carioca (6): 1951, 1959, 1964, 1965, 1967, 1985
- Copa Rio (2): 2010, 2012
- Campeonato Carioca Série A2 (1): 2005

=== Awards ===
- Fita Azul (1): 1962

Fita Azul do Futebol Brasileiro (Brazilian Football Blue Ribbon) was an award given for the club which succeeds in an excursion out of the country.

== Stadium ==
Bangu's stadium is Estádio Guilherme Da Silveira Filho, popularly known as Moça Bonita, built in 1947, with a maximum capacity of 15,000 people. The stadium is considered one of the most traditional stadiums in Rio de Janeiro and Brazil. It's known for its intense heat and popular residentes like "Pombo", "Chiquinho", among others. After Maracanã Stadium was reformed, Bangu's stadium received some of the old seats in one of the only reforms the stadium has faced through years.

== Rivals ==
Bangu's biggest rivals are América, Ceres, and Campo Grande. However, Bangu also has a rivalry with Botafogo FR, CR Flamengo, Fluminense FC and CR Vasco da Gama, the four biggest football clubs from Rio de Janeiro.

== Mascot ==
Bangu's mascot is a beaver, known as castor in Portuguese. Castor de Andrade, a banker of Jogo do Bicho (illicit game in Brazil) financially supported the club for several years. The mascot was created in Castor de Andrade's era.

== Notable coaches ==
- Adhemar Pimenta, 1935–1936, Brazilian World Cup coach 1938
- Aymoré Moreira, 1949–1950, Brazilian World Cup coach 1962
- Ondino Viera, (Uruguay), 1950–1953, 1967, champion coach, e.g. with Vasco da Gama, Botafogo and in Uruguay und Argentina
- Tim, 1953–1956, 1959–1960, 1963–1964, 1980
- Flávio Costa, 1970, Brazilian World Cup coach 1950
- Dorival Knippel "Yustrich", 1978
- Zizinho, 1980
- Paulo César Carpegiani, 1986, Club World Cup winner with Flamengo
- Mário Zagallo, 1988, World Cup Winner as coach and Manager
- Moisés, 1983–85

== Bangu's top scorers ==
1. Ladislau da Guia – 215 goals
2. Moacir Bueno – 162 goals
3. Nívio – 130 goals
4. Menezes – 119 goals
5. Zizinho – 115 goals
6. Paulo Borges – 105 goals
7. Arturzinho – 93 goals
8. Marinho – 83 goals
9. Luís Carlos – 81 goals
10. Décio Esteves and Luisão – 71 goals

== Most matches played ==
1. Ubirajara Motta – 280 matches
2. Ladislau da Guia – 256 matches
3. Zózimo – 256 matches
4. Serjão – 249 matches
5. Nilton dos Santos – 232 matches
6. Moacir Bueno – 231 matches
7. Décio Esteves – 221 matches
8. Gilmar – 221 matches
9. Luisão – 220 matches
10. Luiz Antônio da Guia – 216 matches
