= Moises =

Moises or Moisés is a male name common among people of Iberian origin. It is the Spanish, Portuguese and Tagalog equivalent of the name Moses.

Notable people bearing the name include:

- Moisés (footballer, born 1948) (1948–2008), Brazilian former footballer
- Moisés (footballer, born 1988), Brazilian football midfielder
- Moisés (footballer, born 1990), Brazilian football defender
- Moisés (footballer, born 1995), Brazilian football left-back
- Moisés (footballer, born 1996), Brazilian football forward
- Moisés Aldape (born 1981), Mexican road bicycle racer
- Moisés Alou (born 1966), Dominican-American former outfielder in Major League Baseball
- Moisés Arias (born 1994), American teen actor
- Moisés Avilés (1909–1972), Chilean footballer
- Moisés Baute, Spanish kickboxer
- Moisés Santiago Bertoni, Swiss naturalist
- Moisès Bertran, Spanish composer
- Moises Bicentini (1931–2007), footballer from Curaçao
- Moisés Boudé, Cuban scouting pioneer
- Moisés Cabada (born 1985), Peruvian footballer
- Moisés Caicedo (born 2001), Ecuadorian international footballer from Ecuador
- Moisés Calleros (1989–2024), Mexican boxer
- Moisés Candelario (born 1978), Ecuadorian international footballer
- Moisés Carmona (1912–1991), Catholic bishop
- Moisés Corozo (born 1992), Ecuadorian footballer
- Moises Cuevas (born 1973), Filipino Catholic bishop
- Moisés da Costa Amaral (1938–1989), politician from East Timor
- Moises Delgado Lopez, Spanish footballer
- Moises Denis (born 1961), American politician
- Moisés Dueñas (born 1981), Spanish road racing cyclist
- Moisés Duque (born 1988), Brazilian rugby union player
- Moisés Egert (born 1977), Brazilian footballer
- Moisés Esmeralda, Spanish Paralympic athlete
- Moisés Expósito-Alonso, Spanish scientist
- Moisés Fajardo, Spanish boxer
- Moisés Ferreira, multiple people
- Moisés Fuentes (1985–2022), Mexican boxer
- Moisés Fuentes, Colombian Paralympic swimmer
- Moisés García León (born 1971), Spanish footballer
- Moisés Gaúcho, Brazilian footballer
- Moises Gertner, British businessman
- Moisés Giroldi (died 1989), Panamanian military officer noted for his coup attempt against Manuel Noriega
- Moises Gomez Bordonado (born 1994), Spanish footballer
- Moisés Gutiérrez (born 1994), Mexican baseball player
- Moises Omar Halleslevens Acevedo, Nicaraguan politician
- Moisés Hassan, Nicaraguan politician
- Moisés Henriques (born 1987), Portuguese-Australian cricketer
- Moisés Hernández, footballer
- Moisés Hernández, Dominican Republic taekwondo athlete
- Moisés Hipólito (born 1992), Mexican footballer
- Moisés Hurtado (born 1981), Spanish footballer
- Moisés Jinich (1927–2015), Mexican footballer
- Moisés Kaiman (1913–2012), Polish Mexican rabbi
- Moisés Kaufman (born 1963), Venezuelan playwright and director
- Moises Liebana (1930–2011), Spanish musician
- Moisés Lino e Silva, Brazilian intellectual
- Moisés Lira Serafín (1893–1950), Mexican priest
- Moisés López, multiple people
- Moisés Lupion, Brazilian politician
- Moisés Mamani (1969–2020), Peruvian politician
- Moisés Matias de Andrade (1948–2008), Brazilian footballer
- Moisés Moleiro (1904–1979), Venezuelan pianist and composer
- Moisés Moura (born 1979), Brazilian footballer
- Moisés Muñoz (born 1980), Mexican football goalkeeper
- Moisés Mussa (1900–1982), essayist, philosopher, and educator
- Moisés Naím (born 1952), Venezuelan economist, writer and columnist
- Moisés Narváez Ochoa, Mexican politician
- Moisés Paniagua (born 2007), Bolivian footballer
- Moises Parra, Spanish footballer
- Moisés Pereiro, Spanish footballer
- Moises Salinas (born 1966), Mexican professor and political activist
- Moises Saman, Spanish-Peruvian photographer
- Moisés Santiago Bertoni (1857–1929), Swiss botanist
- Moisés Sierra (born 1988), Dominican baseball player
- Moisés Silva (born 1945), Cuban-American theologian
- Moisés Simons (1889–1945), Cuban composer, pianist and orchestra leader
- Moisés Solana (1935–1969), Mexican racing driver
- Moises Tablante (born 2001), Venezuelan footballer
- Moises Teixeira da Silva, Brazilian criminal and escaped convict
- Moisés Torrealba (born 1978), Venezuelan folk musician
- Moisés Tuʻu Hereveri (c. 1873–1925), a Rapa Nui leader
- Moisés Valle (born 1965), Cuban musician also known as "Yumurí"
- Moises Vela, American attorney and political advisor
- Moisés Velasco (born 1989), Mexican football midfielder
- Moisés Villanueva de la Luz, Mexican politician
- Moisés Villarroel, multiple people
- Moisés Wolfenson, former Peruvian Congressman
- Moisés Zamora, Mexican-American writer, director, and producer

== See also ==
- Moysés, a given name and surname
