= Grañón =

- Municipality
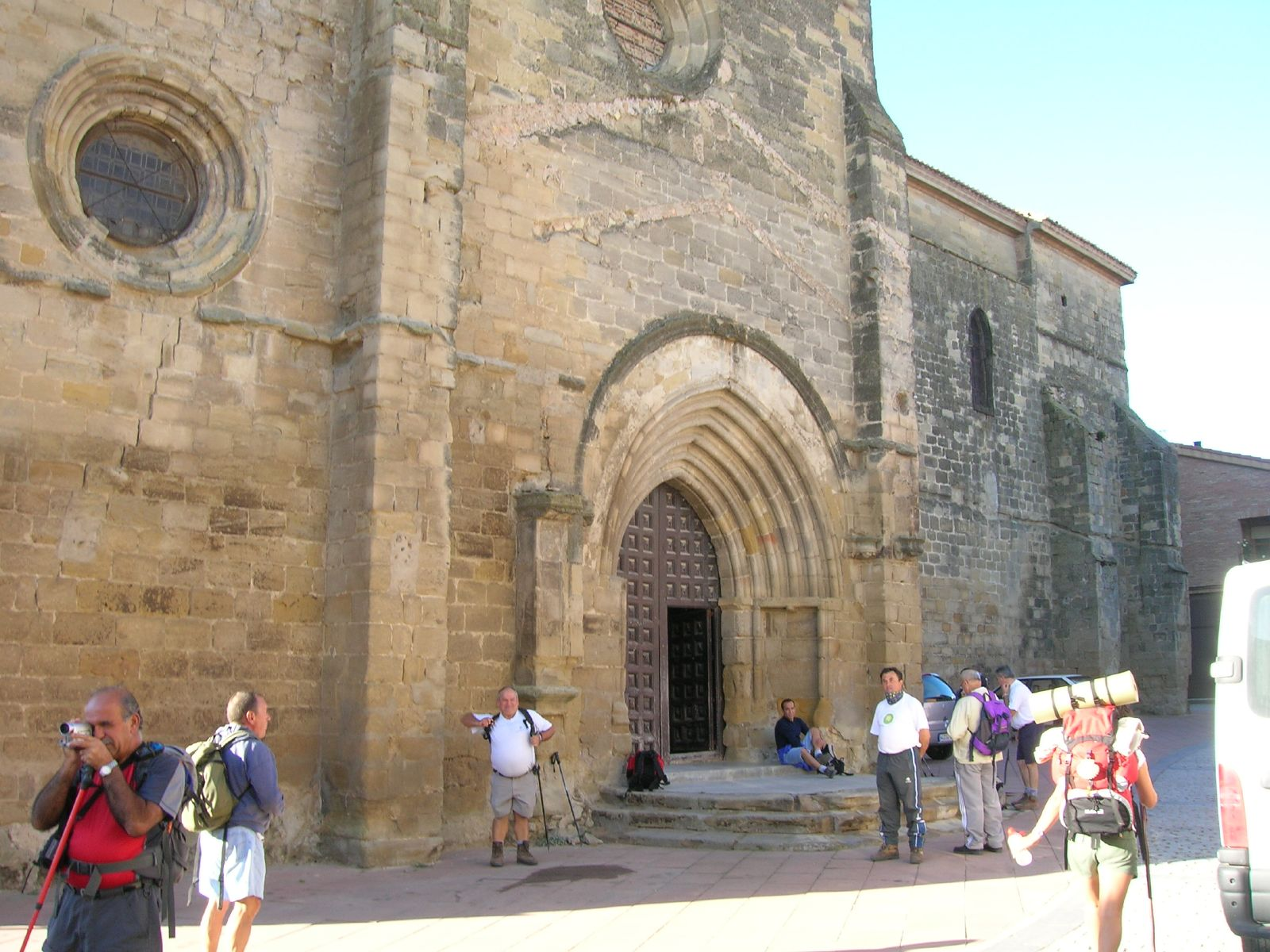
- Church of San Juan Bautista

- Coat of arms

- Location within La Rioja, Spain Location within Spain
- Coordinates: 42°27′01″N 3°01′35″W
- Country: Spain
- Autonomous community: La Rioja
- Comarca: Santo Domingo de la Calzada

Government
  - Mayor: José Ignacio Castro Miguel (PP)

Area
  - Total: 31.01 km^{2} (11.97 sq mi)
- Elevation: 725 m (2,379 ft)

Population (2025-01-01)
  - Total: 209
- Demonym(s): grañonero, ra
- Postal code: 26259
- Website: www.granon.org

Grañón (Spanish pronunciation: [gɾa.ˈɲon]) is a village in the province and autonomous community of La Rioja, Spain. The municipality covers an area of 31.01 square kilometres (11.97 sq mi) and as of 2011 had a population of 307 people. It belongs to the comarca of Santo Domingo de la Calzada and the judicial district of Haro. Its residents, known as Grañoneros or Grañoneras, work primarily in agriculture and the cattle industry, with many young people being forced to leave the village to look for other forms of work in Logroño, the capital of La Rioja.

== Geography ==
The village is located at the furthest west point of La Rioja, within the region known as Rioja Alta, on the border with the Province of Burgos.The landscape ranges from wooded areas, to mountainous areas, to rolling hills. Water is scarce enough for its usage to be restricted during summers with hotter temperatures. Land in the municipality is primarily used for agriculture, with only 10–20% of the land being wooded. The ground is not irrigated, meaning that agriculture is almost entirely dedicated to cereals, although there are also large potato fields and (to a lesser extent) other irrigated crops such as peas and beans.

=== Flora ===
The forested areas are located in two areas known as Monte Carrasquedo and Monte Alto. Monte Carrasquedo is to the south of the municipality. It is a relatively flat natural area, where common and Pyrenean oak trees dominate, although other species of tree such as kermes (carrasca) oak (the tree that gives its name to both the hill and chapel), maple, almond, and wild cherry are also present. In this area, there are also two different types of pine: Pinus sylvestris y Pinus radiata. The trees are surrounded by a wide range of bush species, such as hawthorn, heather, blackthorn, juniper, wild rose, blackberry, rockrose, and gorse. Other plant species that can be found in this area are: oregano, danewort, cardoon, mullein, goosefeet, and wild marjoram.

Monte Alto occupies a smaller area and is populated almost completely with beech and Pyrenean oak trees, as well as a small repopulation of Pinus sylvestris. Among the beech trees, other plants such as anemone, violets, holly, hawthorn and heather also grow, as well as willow, almond, maple and wild cherry trees. In the Pyrenean oak area, juniper, heather, hawthorn and ferns grow, as well as both white and common broom.

=== Fauna ===
Birds such as the coal tit, crested tit, chaffinch, European serin and the woodpecker are common. Jays live among the conifers, and the robin and the common nightingale live in the clearings. In this diverse landscape birds of prey such as goshawks and sparrow hawks can be found, while black kites are often seen in open spaces. Among mammals, squirrels are abundant due to the large amount of tree cover, with field mice, wild boar, foxes and badgers also seen. Reptiles include green lizards and common wall lizards. Vipers are also occasionally seen, depending on the time of year.

== History ==
Documents from the time period suggest that the existence of Grañón dates back to the 9th century, when the king of León, Alfonso III, ordered a castle to be constructed on top of a hill located next to the village, which was known as Mirabel or Mirabelia. According to the Chronica Naierensis, there was a castle in Grañón by the year 885. Other studies suggest it was built in the year 889. This fortress, as well as others in the vicinity, would have been used to defend attacks from Muslims in Christian territory. Under the protection of Grañón's castle, small hamlets and neighbourhoods began to develop, which gradually saw a population being established in the area. Various hospitals were known to be present in the town. One of these was the Hospital of Carrasquedo, where a chapel of the same name stands today.

Grañón was involved in the territorial battles between Sancho VI of Navarre and Alfonso VIII of Castile in the second half of the 11th century. In 1176, the Navarrese and the Castilians were reunited under the arbitration of the English king, Henry II, to put an end to the war. The Navarrese king claimed Mirabel Castle belonged to him through hereditary right, but Grañón's castle remained with the Castilians. In 1187, Alfonso VIII granted a fuero (a local jurisdiction) to the village, with which the urban planning of the new settlement was determined.

When Domingo de la Calzada re-routed the Camino de Santiago in medieval times from the old Roman road, directing it towards Burgos and causing it to pass through Grañón and Redecilla del Camino, the town was revitalised.

Grañón used to be surrounded by walls, although no trace of these remains today. As the new village centre became established, the castle's importance to the village reduced as it evolved, with its populating growing. The fertile soils of Grañón have seen many disputes over the years. The most famous of these is the Leyenda de los Valientes (Legend of the Brave), where the towns of Grañón and Santo Domingo de la Calzada fought over the ownership of a 1000 ha parcel of land known as La Dehesa, which is located between the two towns.

=== Leyenda de los Valientes (Legend of the Brave) ===
It is said that, many centuries ago, there was a dispute over an extensive dehesa located between the towns of Grañón and Santo Domingo. The inhabitants of Grañón observed with disgust at how the dehesa that they believed belonged to them was being used by their neighbours in Santo Domingo. The people of Santo Domingo argued that those lands belonged to them by right. The two sides could not come to an agreement and residents of both towns were constantly arguing and fighting. Eventually, an armed conflict broke out between the residents of the two towns. Representatives from both towns met up and decided that each town would choose one person to fight – unarmed – for the disputed lands. The winner would take the dehesa for their town.

While Santo Domingo's chosen representative was a skilled fighter fed on a diet of select foods, Martín García, Grañón's representative, was a simple farmer and fed himself on a diet of caparrones (red kidney beans).

The big day arrived. The Santo Domingo fighter had been covered in oil to stop the Grañonero from getting hold of him. To get around this issue, Martín García inserted a finger into his opponent's anus, which enabled him to pick him up and launch him far. With this, Martín García won La Dehesa for Grañón.

In August, a celebratory pilgrimage takes place to the Cruz de los Valientes (Cross of the Brave), which is located between the two towns, in the same location where this battle supposedly took place. There, the dispute is commemorated alongside residents of Santo Domingo. Flowers are left in the name of Martín García and caparrones are eaten.

In 1995, the Grañonero singer Juancho Ruiz el Charro wrote the song La cruz de los valientes (The cross of the brave) which recalls the legend of Martín García. It was performed at the cross in August 2001.

== Art ==
=== Urbanism and civil architecture ===
The medieval layout of Grañón was orientated around the San Juan monastery (now the parish church), which the village grew around. It is made up of four main longitudinal streets: Calle La Parrilla, Calle Santiago, Calle Mayor and Calle El Caño, with other streets cutting through these perpendicularly. Traditional civil architecture can be found in the oldest streets: Calle Santiago and Calle Mayor.

Most houses are two storeys tall, with both ashlar and rubble masonry on the lower floor, and wood and brick on the upper floor. Many of the buildings’ façades house old coats of arms, which represent the families that the homes belonged to. The oldest houses date from the 16th and 17th centuries, but the originals have not been preserved due to restoration work. In Calle El Caño, there is a two-storey 18th-century house, with both floors made from ashlar and rubble masonry, lintelled openings and a balcony with iron fittings.

Grañón's oldest square is Plaza de la Iglesia, which was built in the 17th century. The original San Juan monastery was located here. At the beginning of the 20th century two new squares were opened, Plaza del Hórreo and Plaza de Ávila.

Other civil structures include the sinks and fountains, which are still used in the daily lives of locals today.

In Grañón two lavoirs can be found in the town. These are simple structures that were used by women for washing clothes well into the 20th century. According to an unpublished study carried out by María Amor García Antolín, the oldest lavoir dates back to the 18th century and is situated at the end of Calle Las Cercas on the outskirts of town. The structure is made up of a rectangular wash basin, built into the floor and protected by a recently remodelled structure, open on two sides and covered by a roof with a wooden interior. The other lavoir is found in the middle of Calle Las Cercas, next to the fronton (Basque pelota court). This structure is made up of a fountain with four spouts built between 1862 and 1864, a circular drinking trough that dates back to 1885 and, attached to this, a sink with a large rectangular concrete basin that receives water from the fountain.

The fountain in Plaza de Ávila is the second oldest in the village. It was built in 1926 and is located in the centre of the square. It consists of a main body with a single spout, now waterless, situated on top of a tank in the form of a shell. A basin is connected to it that used to serve as a drinking trough for animals, although nowadays it is no longer used for this purpose. Today its main purpose is decoration for the garden in which it is located. At the end of the 20th century a new stone fountain was constructed in Plaza del Hórreo, placed in a corner of the town hall's exterior, as an homage to pilgrims.

=== Religious architecture ===
Grañón has an important historical and artistic heritage associated with the growth that the town experienced during the Middle and Modern Ages, and with its close relationship to the Camino de Santiago. Various monasteries have been recorded that have disappeared over time, merging into the San Juan monastery around which the current town was founded. There was also a large number of chapels that no longer stand today. Today, historical interest is concentrated in the church of San Juan Bautista (where a small museum and sacristy can be found), the chapel of Nuestra Señora de Carrasquedo (Our Lady of Carrasquedo) and the Ermita de los Judíos (Chapel of the Jews).

==== Parish Church of San Juan Bautista ====
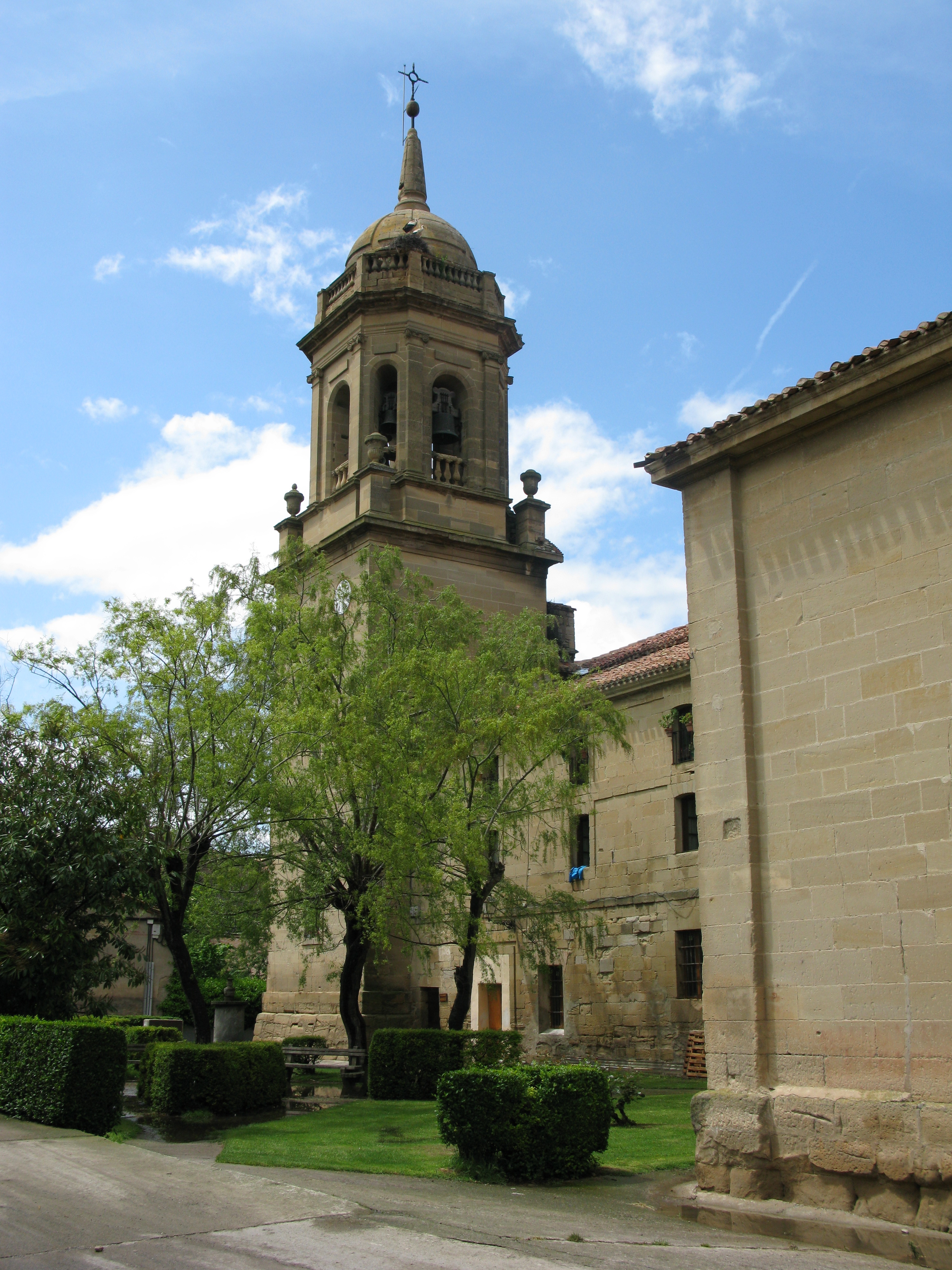
Parish Church of San Juan Bautista

The church is located in the centre of the town, in Plaza del Hórreo. It is made up of a nave with three bays, a chancel and a three-sided octagonal apse. At the end of the apse is the sacristy, which extends to the south. The tower is formed of two bodies of ashlar. There are three portals: a semicircular arch at the foot of the apse, another made up of six pointed archivolts and a third one that is blocked up. Construction dates back to the 15th and 16th centuries, although the new sacristy and the tower are more recent. Various stonemasons took part in its construction, although only three of them are known by name: Grand Master Fernando (director of works in 1537), Juan de Huequel and Juan de Elgorriaga (who worked on the church until 1573).

In terms of the interior, among noteworthy items are the baptismal font from the 12th century, the only part that remains of the original monastery, and the reredos dedicated to Saint John. This is a work of rich ornamentation, built between 1545 and 1556, and formed by plateresque motifs and reliefs within which sculptures full of movement were created. Among the artists that took part in the construction of the reredos are the craftsman of the architecture of the predella, Natura Borgoñón, sculptors Bernal Forment and Juan de Beaugrant and polychrome expert Francisco de Lubiano. This structure was restored in 1993. Also of note is the ashlar work on the 18 seats situated in the rood screen, which is a classical work from the 17th century.

The church has been a Site of Cultural Interest in Spain under the category of monument since 1982. The church in Grañón, as much as the village itself, has become a notable destination on the Camino de Santiago, both for its historical and artistic value, as well as the fact that it shares its space with the well-known parish albergue (Hospital de Peregrinos de San Juan Bautista) that is attached to its south side. Grañón's fame on the Camino led to its choice as one of the 20 landmarks on the French route of the Camino de Santiago on a programme produced to commemorate the 20th anniversary of the declaration of the Camino as a UNESCO World Heritage Site, an initiative which was developed during 2014.

==== Ermita de Carrasquedo ====
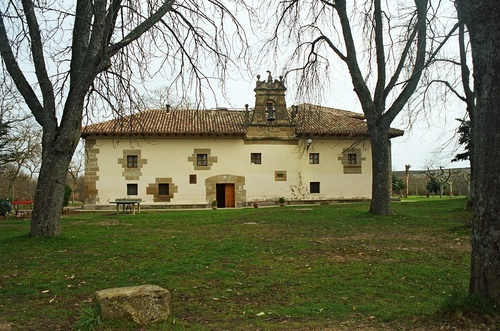
Ermita de Carrasquedo

Located 1.5 km south of the town of Grañón, this chapel is surrounded by a forest, within which the old Santa Cruz de Carrasquedo hospital was located (according to documentary sources). The current building is of baroque design from the end of the 17th century, with both ashlar and rubble masonry primarily used. It consists of a single nave with four bays, a rectangular apse and a sacristy. On the inside, the crossing is covered by a hemispherical dome with a cupola, while the rest of the nave is enclosed in a barrel vault with lunettes, supported on Corinthian pilasters and semicircular arches. The main altarpiece is baroque, and was initially constructed by Diego de Ichazo. It was restored in 1989. On the outside, there is an entrance with a semicircular arch supported by pilasters and with an entablature and a bell-gable. In the centre there is an image of the patron saint of Grañón, Our Lady of Carrasquedo.

==== Ermita de los Judíos (Chapel of the Jews) ====
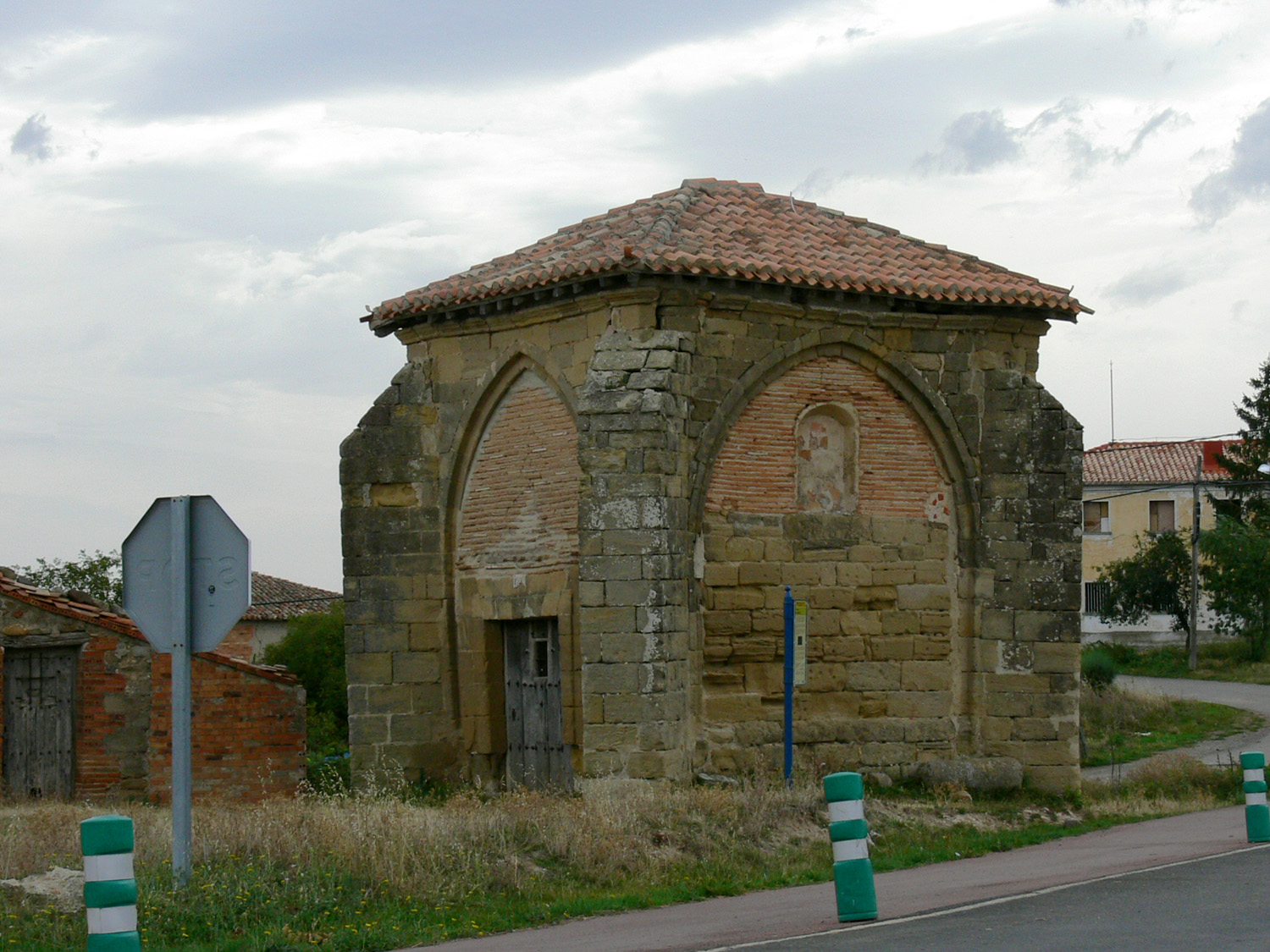
Ermita de los Judíos (Chapel of the Jews)

This chapel consists of a covered plateresque crossing that used to serve as a guide for pilgrims. This is why it is located at the exit of the town, on the junction of the Villarta-Quintana, Morales and Corporales roads.Inside there is a cross which sits on top of a Tuscan column where the following inscription can be read: “Hizole Bicente clérigo beneficiado en San Juan de Grañon”. Until recently, the chapel's altar was a mannerist altarpiece from the year 1540, in which Jesus can be seen being harassed and ridiculed by the Jews during the crowning with thorns in the presence of Caiaphas and Annas and other members of the Sanhedrin. The name of the chapel was inspired by this image. This altarpiece, belonging to the school of Damián Forment, was restored between the years of 2009–2010, and can now be found in the chapel adjoined to the parish church. The Chapel of the Jews remains closed to the public all year round, except on Good Friday, the day when the traditional Via Crucis starts at the chapel and continues over to the chapel of Our Lady of Carrasquedo. From there, she is immediately returned to the village in procession with the lying Christ and Our Lady of Sorrows.

== Notable people ==
- Count García Ordóñez (c. 1060–1108): Tenant-in-chief of Grañón and Count of Nájera, among other titles, known as "García of Grañón" and "the Crespo (curly-haired man) of Grañón" (which is how he is known in the Chronica Naierensis and in the third part of the Cantar de Mío Cid, as the enemy of Rodrígo Díaz de Vivar, el Cid Campeador). He was one of the most significant members of Castilian nobility during the reign of Alfonso VI. He became tutor of the infant heir Sancho Alfónsez as well as being armiger regis, and played a significant role in the repopulation of La Rioja (known as the Charter of Logroño). He was killed in the Battle of Uclés defending the infant Sancho Alfónsez.
- Don Sancho de Grañón (11th–12th century): Benedictine monk who was a personal friend of Saint Dominic of Silos, and was Bishop of Calahorra from 1109 to 1117. His pontificate was marked both by the dedication of the church of Cañas to Saint Mary, honouring the wishes of Saint Dominic, and by the reinforcement of episcopal power over parochial power. In 1109 he obtained a papal bull from Pope Paschal II through which the diocese of Calahorra was formed around the provinces of Álava, Vizcaya, Nájera and Los Cameros. This act put an end to the confusion that had arisen since the Muslim invasion and definitively sanctioned the titles of bishop and pastor of the Calahorra prelate. Today the street that joins Plaza del Hórreo with Plaza de Ávila is named after him.
- Martín García (mid-14th century): Grañón resident who, according to the Leyenda de los Valientes (Legend of the Brave), defeated his opponent from Santo Domingo in a fight to the death for the dehesa that both towns disputed. He would go on to die days later, presumably as a result of the after-effects the fight. Having become a local hero, he is honoured every August with a caparronada (a dish of seasoned caparrones) next to the Cruz de los Valientes, in the location where the fight took place. In the past people would recite the Lord's prayer and the Hail Mary for the resting of his soul during the Eucharist on Sundays in the parish church of Grañón. The street that connects the north entrance to the town (by the Barbackana bar) with the Plaza de Ávila (to the south) takes his name.
- Don Agustín Morquecho Alonso del Valle (31 August 1788 – c. 1850): A member of one of the most important families in Grañón, he became incumbent priest of the parish church of San Juan Bautista. An educated man who was committed to his home town, at the start of the 19th century he was vice-president of the Royal Economic Society of Friends of Castilian La Rioja, in which he had a major role, leading many initiatives within the society such as in road construction, finance sourcing and the wine trade. In 1810 he was one of the Riojans proposed by Bishop Francisco Mateo Aguiriano y Gómez to represent the diocese of Calahorra in the Cortes of Cádiz (1810–1814), although in the end he did not participate in this important parliament due to a change in election system. A priest with liberal and reformist tendencies, in 1820 and in the context of the Trienio Liberal, (1820–1823), he was selected as member of the provincial government of Burgos (which the territory of La Rioja Alta belonged to at the time, with La Rioja Baja being located within the province of Soria). He actively worked towards achieving administrative independence for La Rioja and in 1822 the culmination of his life's work would come to fruition, as he became one of the members of the new government formed when the province of Logroño was established. Nothing is known of his career trajectory after the restoration of absolutism by Fernando VII in 1823.
- Juancho Ruiz, el Charro: (8 September 1958) A Spanish singer, author, promoter, arranger and music producer, whose work spans genres such as mariachi, country, Latin pop, bolero, jazz, merengue, latin ballad, and who was born in Grañón.

== Festivals and traditions ==
In Grañón, various festivals are celebrated throughout the year. The most important are:

- Fiesta de la Virgen de Carrasquedo (25 March): Mass is celebrated in the chapel of the Virgin of Carrasquedo and open-air dancing is performed.
- 1 May: The Virgin of Carrasquedo is processed from the chapel to the church of San Juan Bautista, where it will spend the entire summer. The pilgrimage to the town is considerable in size and the dancers perform throughout the entire journey to the rhythm of traditional instruments such as the gaita and the tamboril. Before entering the town, a small procession heads out with Saint John the Baptist to meet with the virgin to welcome her. When the two saints meet, quatrains are usually recited. The following Sunday, the Virgin is taken out again to be paraded through the town and to bless the fields.
- Saint John and Saint Juanito (24 and 25 June): On the day of St John, bonfires are lit and people dance outside. At dawn, carriages are decorated on the hill and are then processed through the streets, waking the locals, who usually bring gifts of pastries and drinks (recently water has also been requested) from house to house.
- Fiesta de Gracias (Festival of Thanksgiving) (Last week in August): Thanks is given for the harvest and the Virgin is returned to the chapel, where she will spend the winter. On the last day of the festival, patatas a la riojana are prepared in the area surrounding the chapel.

Other events, that began to be celebrated at later dates, include:

- Caparrones at the Cruz de los Valientes (mid-August). Martín García's victory over his opponent from Santo Domingo is commemorated. Citizens of both towns meet halfway, where the cross stands, to make an offering of flowers and enjoy the famous caparrones.

A street market takes place in Grañón every Wednesday, where a variety of products can be purchased.

== Cultural associations ==
There are three associations of great importance to the lives of the town's citizens: the Association of Friends of the Chapel of Carrasquedo, the Martín García Association of the Elderly and the Women's Association of Grañón. The Friends of the Chapel of Carrasquedo Association carries out various activities, particularly in the month of August, during Cultural Week. Created in 1989, it publishes a magazine entitled Mirabel (previously La Voz Cultural), which is produced three times a year, containing articles that recount interesting stories about life in Grañón. Among the young, an important group is the Cuatro Cantones club, which carries out various activities during the month of August, such as games for children and the sharing out of choricillo, a smaller form of chorizo.
