= Tormantos =

- Municipality
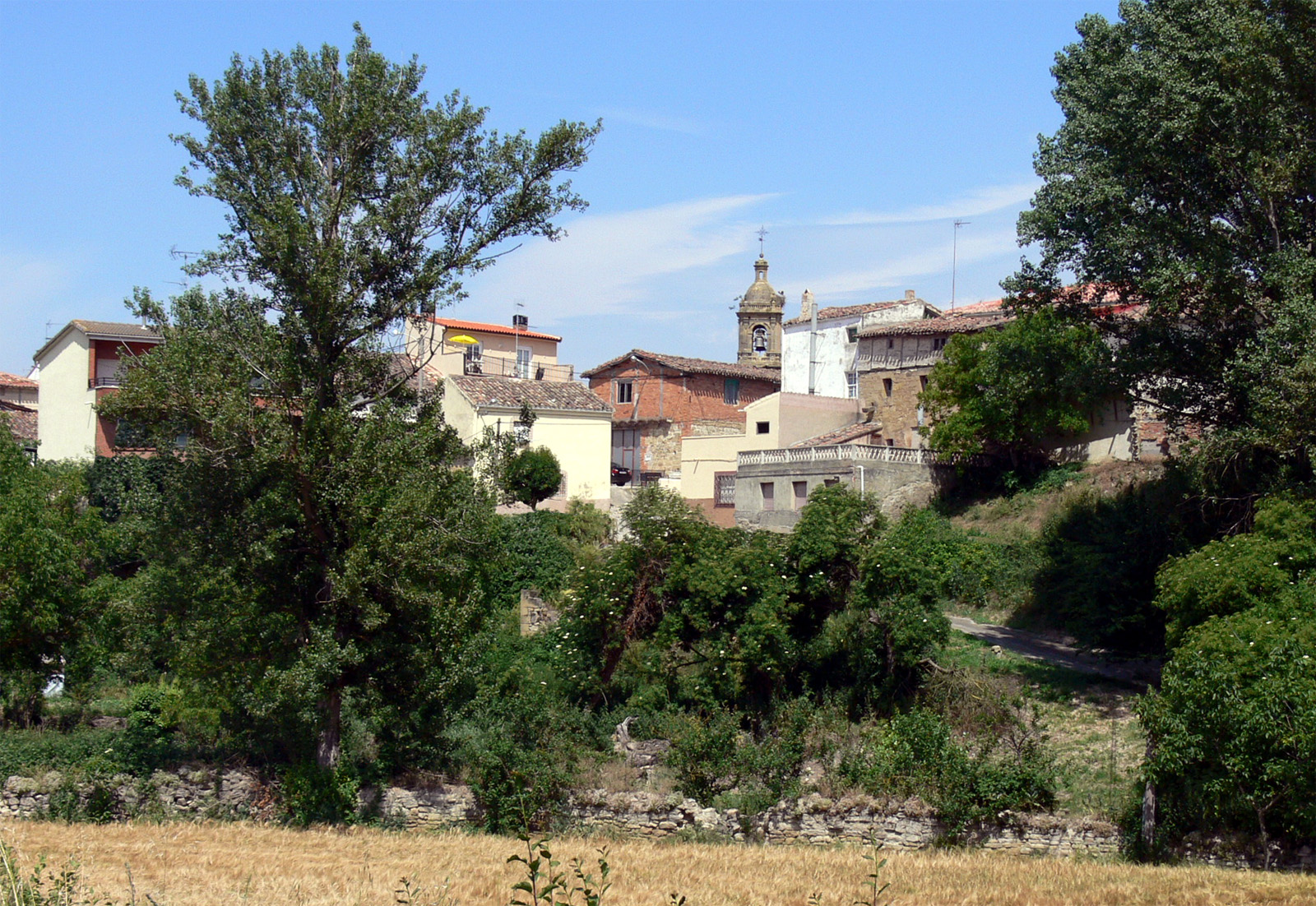
- Skyline of Tormantos

- Location within La Rioja, Spain Location within Spain
- Coordinates: 42°29′39″N 3°04′26″W
- Country: Spain
- Autonomous community: La Rioja
- Comarca: Santo Domingo de la Calzada

Government
  - Mayor: Josefa Fernández Diz (PP)

Area
  - Total: 11.07 km^{2} (4.27 sq mi)
- Elevation: 608 m (1,995 ft)

Population (2025-01-01)
  - Total: 124
- Demonym(s): tormantino, na
- Postal code: 26213
- Website: www.tormantos.org

Tormantos is a municipality of the autonomous community of La Rioja (Spain). It is located in the most western part of La Rioja, in the region of Rioja Alta, bordering with the province of Burgos. It is located in the fertile plains of the valley of the Tirón river. It is the first town with a crossing of the river.

== History ==
The first historical reference to Tormantos is in the 12th century (year 1137); it is a donation document made by Don Blasco Álvarez, neighbour of Tormantos, to Santo Domingo de la Calzada, in which he transferred a wineyard. In 1146, the king Alfonso VII included Tormantos in the Fuero of Cerezo, a village which become independent during the reign of Charles III of Spain.

Another document dates back to 1269, in which Don Simón Roiz transferred his wife Sancha Alfonso, daughter of the king of the León, everything he owned "in Tormantos and all its territories".

Until the 12th century, the French route of the Camino de Santiago passed through this area, following the same path of the Roman road. Subsequently, it was diverted to Santo Domingo and its current route.

In the census of population of the Kingdom of Castille in the 16th century, Tormantos is mentioned in the Archdiocese of Burgos and the Deanery of Belorado, with a total population of 200 souls.

== Places of interest ==
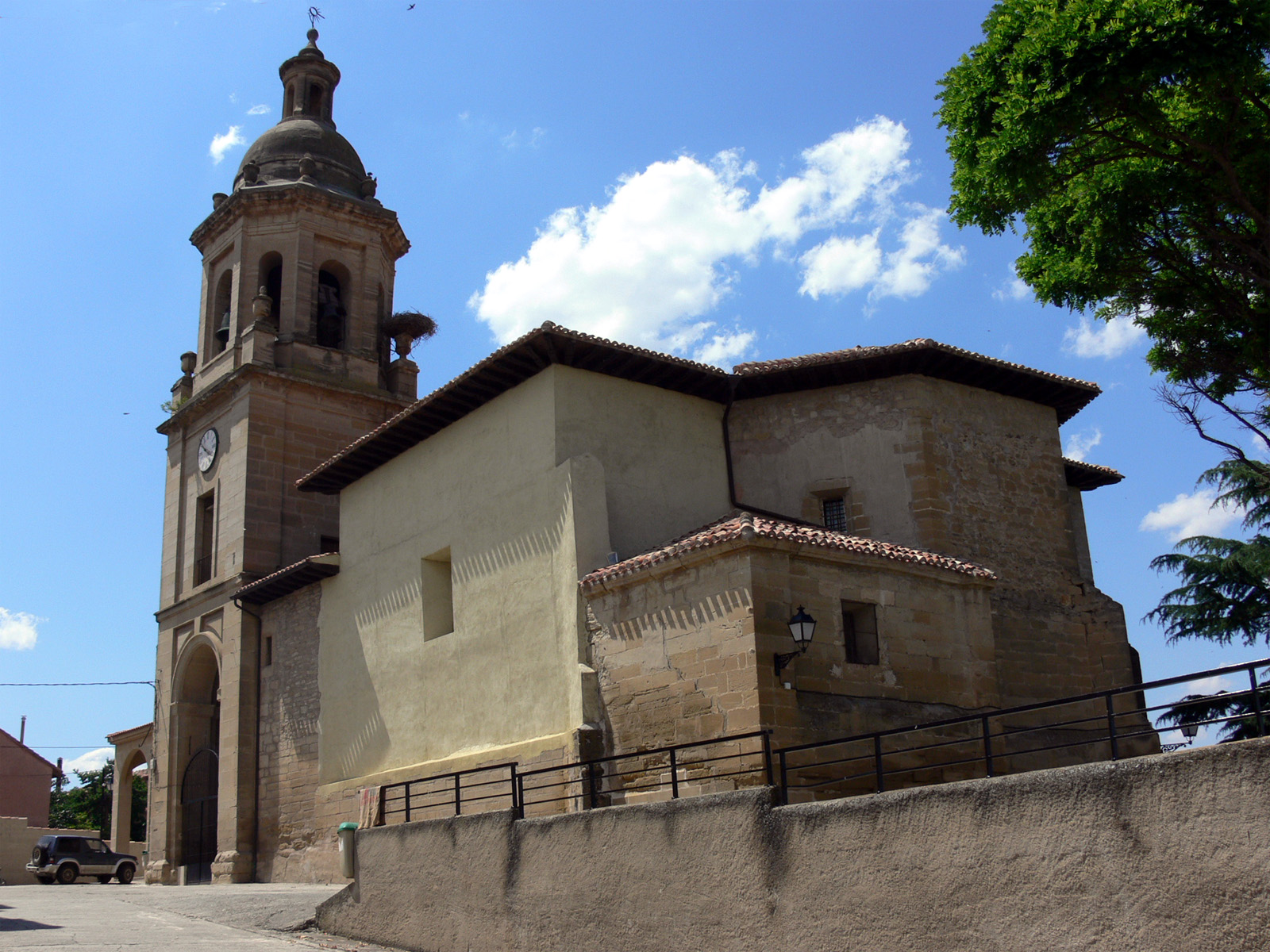
Church of San Esteban.

- Parish church of San Esteban Protomártir
- Palace of Ruy López Dávalos

== Politics ==
List of mayors since the democratic elections of 1979
| Term | Mayor | Political party |
|---|---|---|
| 1979–1983 | Ángel Gil Manero | PP |
| 1983–1987 | Ángel Gil Manero | PP |
| 1987–1991 | Javier Lafuente Zuñeda | PSOE |
| 1991–1995 | Javier Lafuente Zuñeda | PSOE |
| 1995–1999 | José Alberto Imaña Alonso | PSOE |
| 1999–2003 | José Alberto Imaña Alonso | PSOE |
| 2003–2007 | Ramón Bastida López | PSOE |
| 2007–2011 | Mónica Alonso Santamaría | PSOE |
| 2011–2015 | Josefa Fernández Diz | PP |
| 2015–2019 | Josefa Fernández Diz | PP |
| 2019–2023 | n/d | n/d |
| 2023– | n/d | n/d |
