= Escape tunnel =

Secret passage used to escape captivity

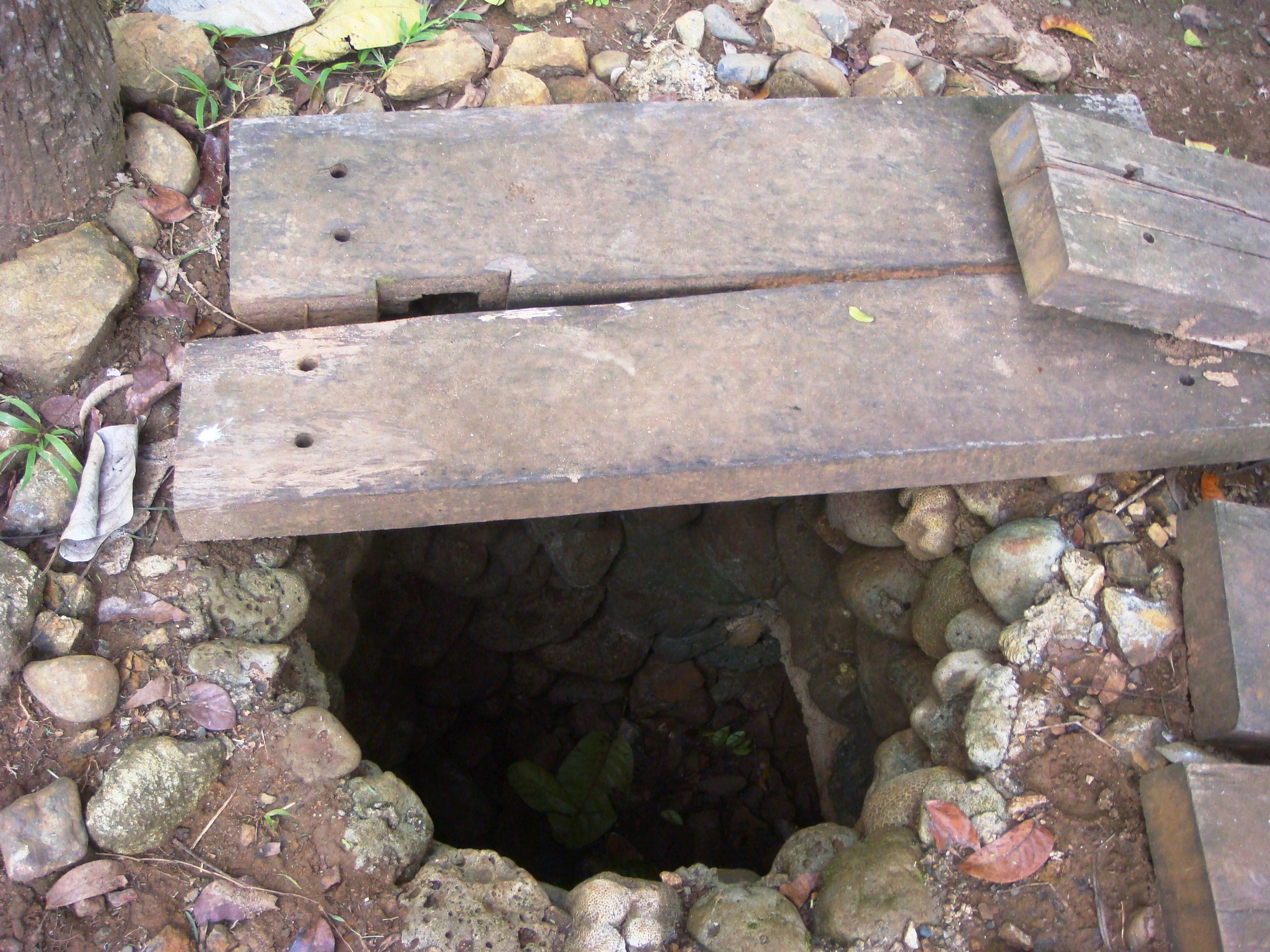
Ancient, historic escape tunnel site (Baler, Aurora, Philippines)

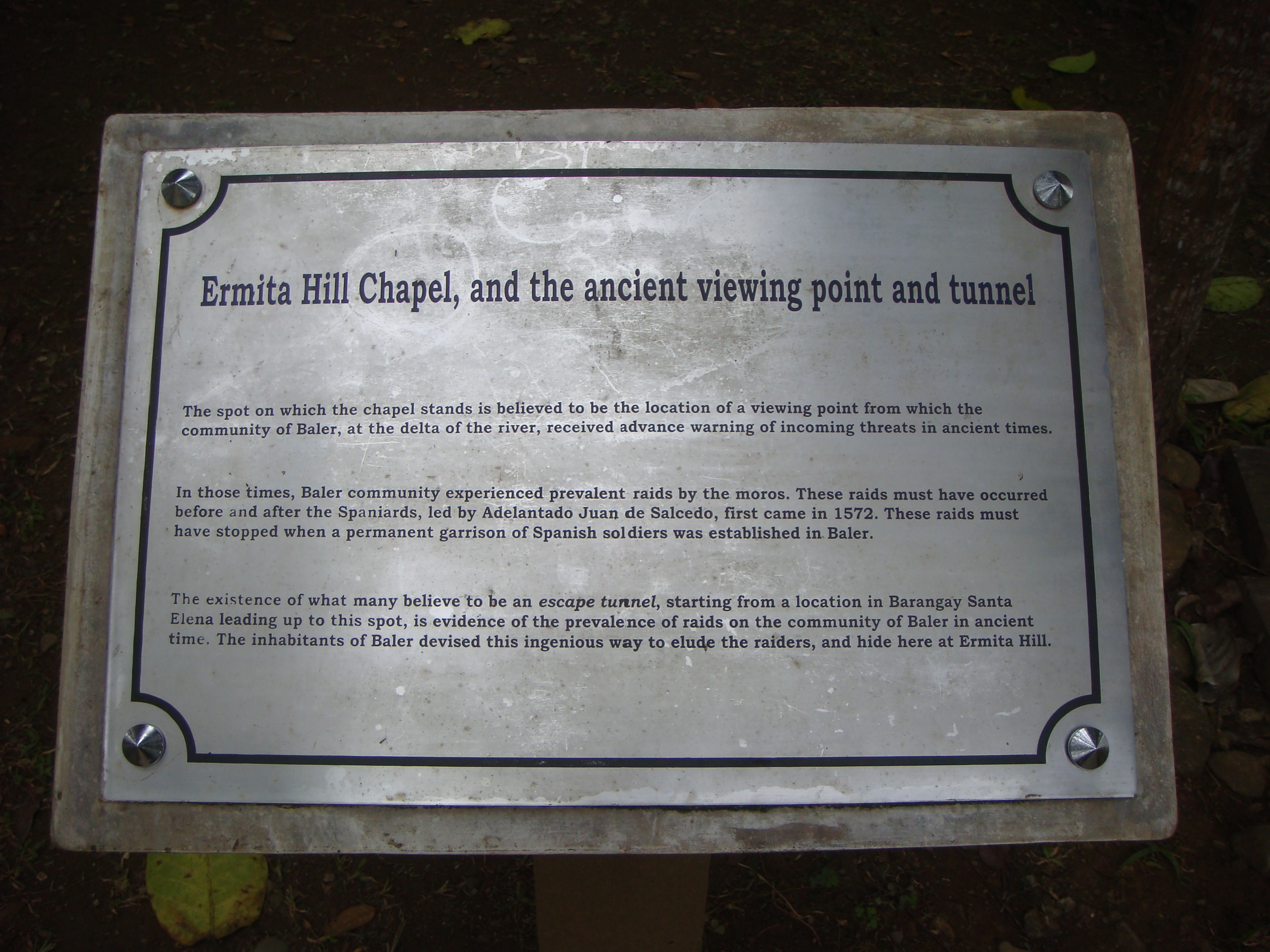
Memorial and marker of Ermita Hill chapel and the ancient viewing point and tunnel

An escape tunnel is a form of secret passage used as part of an escape from siege or captivity. In the Middle Ages, such tunnels were usually constructed by the builders of castles or palaces who wished to have an escape route if their domains were under attack. Prisoners have also dug escape tunnels to flee captivity.

In road and rail tunnels, narrower escape tunnels are provided to enable people to escape on foot in the event of a fire or other accident. For example, between the two main bores of the Channel Tunnel is an access tunnel large enough for a fire engine.

== Medieval escape tunnels ==
Throughout the British Isles and much of northern Europe, escape tunnels were often part of the intrinsic designs of fortified houses and palaces. They were typically one half to two kilometers long, opening in a location not readily visible to attackers. Examples are at Muchalls Castle (Scotland) and the Bishops Palace at Exeter (England).

== Prison escapes ==
=== Successful escapes ===
The following escapes were at least a partial success, with prisoners escaping via tunnels:

Successful Tunnel-Based Prison Escapes
Prison Location	Year	Number of Successful Escapees	Length of Tunnel	Details
Stalag Luft III, Żagań, Nazi Germany (now Poland)	1943	3	30 m	"The Wooden Horse", Lieutenant Michael Codner, Flight Lieutenant Eric Williams, and Flight Lieutenant Oliver Philpot
Stalag Luft III, Żagań, Nazi Germany (now Poland)	1944	76	102 m	Led by Roger Bushell during World War II. The story was made into the 1963 film The Great Escape.
Island Farm, Bridgend, southern Wales, UK	1945	70	21 m	The prison held Axis prisoners of war during World War II.
Carandiru prison, São Paulo, Brazil.	2001	100 (approx)	unreported	Moises Teixeira da Silva, a convicted robber
Dugaluft, Frankfurt, Germany	1941	1	unknown	Peter Butterworth was an English comic actor.
Kırşehir, Turkey	1988	18	118 m	Turkish & Kurdish political prisoners (Bektas Karakaya, Hasan H. Yildirim, Cumali Çataltepe, Selman Altinoz, Adem Kutuk, Sait Keles)
Miguel Castro Prison, Lima, Peru	1990	39 to 48	200 m	Victor Polay and Tupac Amaru Revolutionary Movement members.
Vellore Fort, India	1995	43	47 m	Tamil Tiger inmates.
Yemen	2006	23	TODO	Inmates of Political Security Organization, including convicted mastermind of the USS Cole Bombing Jamal al-Badawi.
Burail, India	1998	3	TODO	Escapees: Jagtar Singh Hawara, Jagtar Singh Tara, Paramjit Singh Beora
Sarposa Prison, Kandahar, Afghanistan	2011	476	320 m	All but one were Taliban members.
Penal del Altiplano, Almoloya de Juarez, State of Mexico	2015	1	1500 m	Escapee: Mexican drug lord Joaquín Guzmán Loera, "El Chapo Guzmán", who originally was captured in 1993 in Guatemala and escaped from a Mexican federal maximum-security prison in 2001. He was rearrested by Mexican authorities on 22 February 2014 in Mazatlán, Sinaloa, Mexico, but escaped on July 11, 2015.

=== Unsuccessful escapes ===
- Prisoners at Camp Bucca, a U.S.-run prison in Iraq, completed their tunnelling but did not make their bid for freedom, with the tunnel being discovered in March 2005.

== Fictional escapes ==
- Agamemnon Busmalis from the television series Oz
- The Count of Monte Cristo
- Hogan's Heroes
- The Shawshank Redemption
- Stalag 17
- Prison Break
- Homer Simpson, in a parody of Edmond Dantès, in the episode "Revenge Is a Dish Best Served Three Times"
- Prisoner Cell Block H

== See also ==
- Hunting Hitler
- Smuggling tunnel
