= Gaita cabreiresa =

All about Gaita Cabreinresa

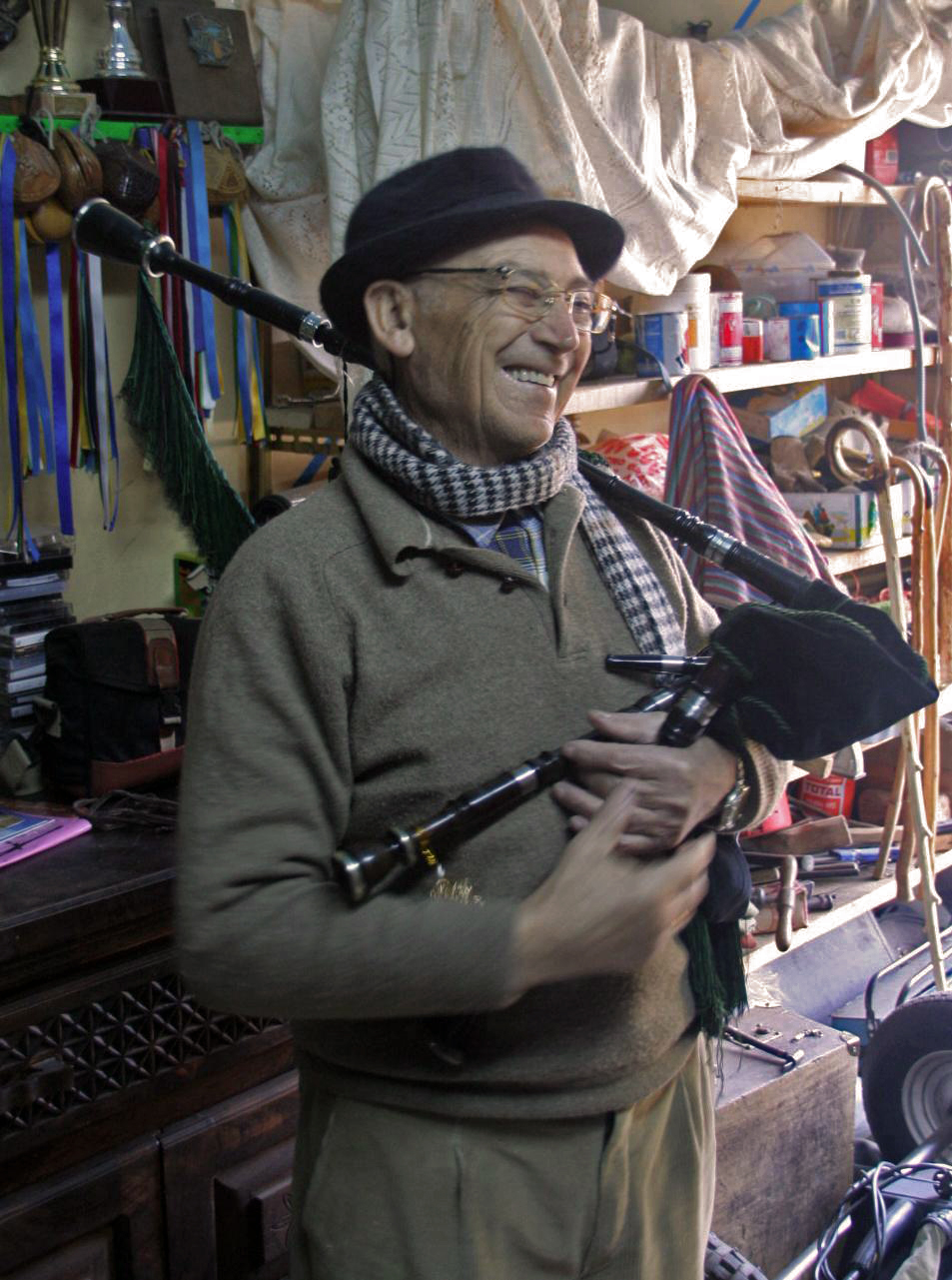
Moises Liebana

The gaita cabreiresa (or gaita llionesa (lhionesa)) was a type of bagpipe native to the comarca of La Cabreira, in the Spanish province of León.

The instrument had become extinct, but was revived through the efforts of bagpiper Moises Liebana and ethnographer Concha Casado in the 1990s.
