= Villarta-Quintana =

- Municipality
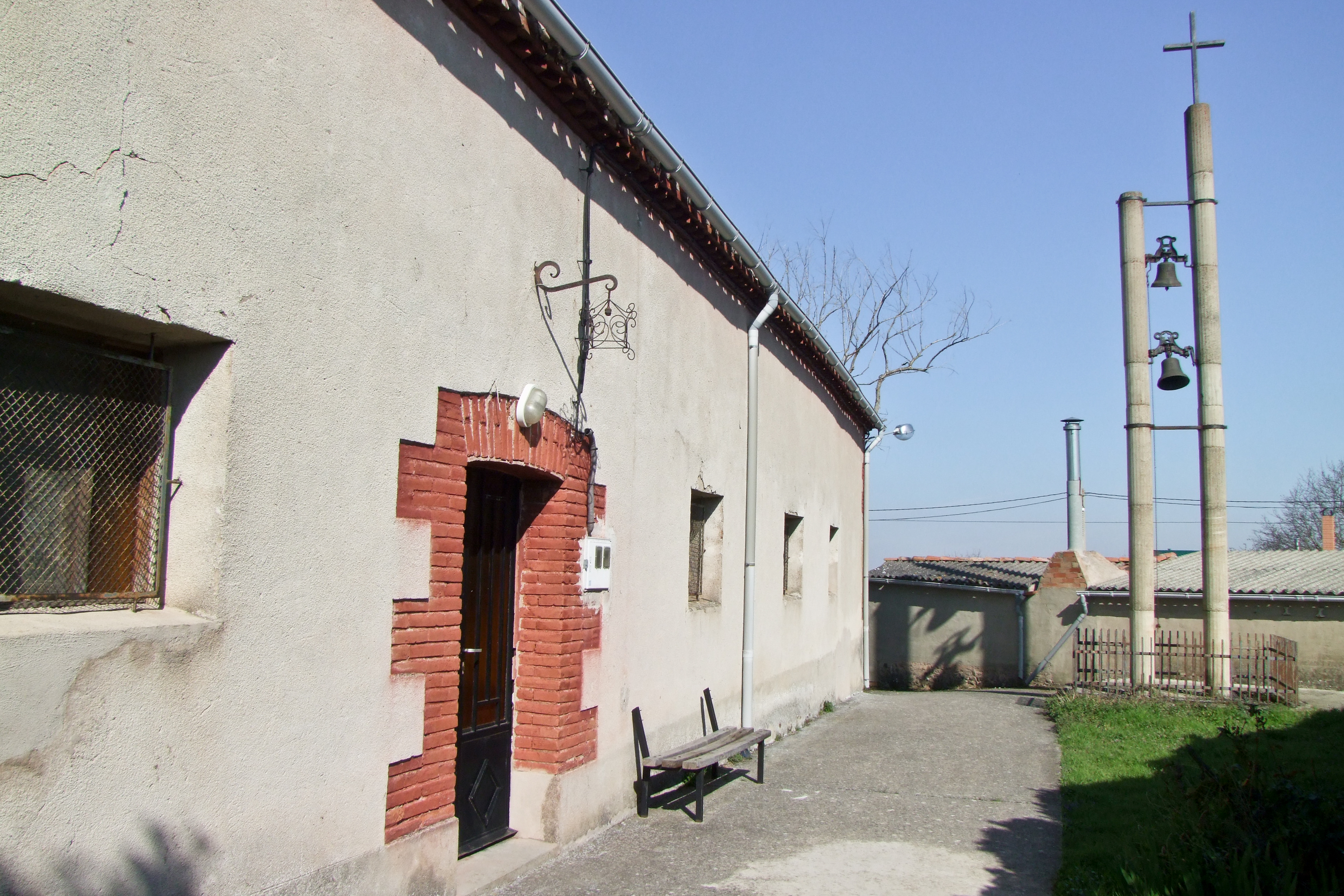

- Location within La Rioja, Spain Location within Spain
- Coordinates: 42°25′47″N 3°02′57″W
- Country: Spain
- Autonomous community: La Rioja
- Comarca: Santo Domingo de la Calzada

Government
  - Mayor: José Miguel Crespo Pérez (PP)

Area
  - Total: 24.73 km^{2} (9.55 sq mi)
- Elevation: 743 m (2,438 ft)

Population (2025-01-01)
  - Total: 129
- Demonym(s): villartino, na
- Postal code: 26259

Villarta-Quintana is a municipality and village in the province and autonomous community of La Rioja, Spain. The municipality covers an area of 24.73 square kilometres (9.55 sq mi) and as of 2011 had a population of 166 people.
