= Moisés Ferreira =

Moisés Ferreira may refer to:

- Moisés Ferreira (politician) (born 1985), Portuguese politician
- Moisés Ferreira (footballer) (born 1990), Portuguese footballer
