= Moises Liebana =

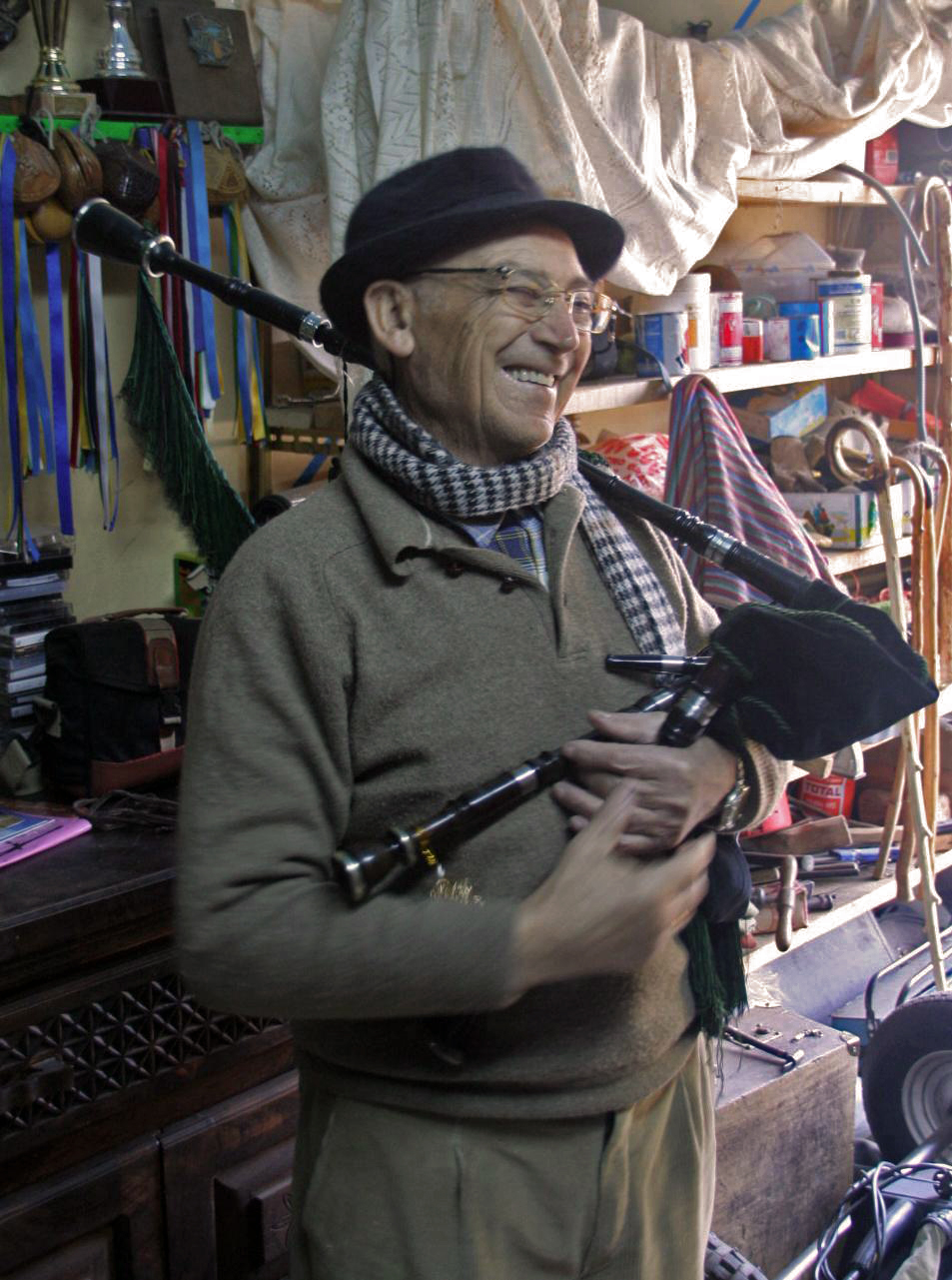

Moises Liebana (1930–2011) was a noted player of the gaita cabreiresa bagpipe of León Province, Spain, known for reviving such works as the Danza del rey Nabucodonosor. In 2011, the Ayuntamiento de Truchas dedicated a plaza in Corporales to his memory.
