= Moisés Expósito-Alonso =

Spanish scientist

- Born: 1990 (age 35–36); Alicante, Spain
- Education: University of Seville, University of Edinburgh, Max Planck Society
- Awards: Forbes 30 Under 30 in Science, National Institutes of Health Director's Early Independence Award, Max Planck Society Otto Hahn Medal
- Scientific career
- Fields: Plant Biology, Global Ecology and Evolutionary Genetics

Moisés Expósito-Alonso (born 1990, Alicante) is a Spanish scientist and assistant professor of global change biology at the University of California, Berkeley, member of the Innovative Genomics Institute, and inaugural Freeman Hrabowski Scholar from the Howard Hughes Medical Institute. His research includes the study of plants and how climate change affects their evolution.

== Education ==
Exposito-Alonso graduated with a Bachelor of Science degree in biology from the University of Seville, Spain, in 2013, where he worked at the Doñana Biological Station (CSIC). He completed his Master of Science in quantitative and population genetics from the University of Edinburgh in 2014. He conducted his doctorate in 2018 at the Max Planck Institute of Biology in Tübingen, Germany under Detlef Weigel. After his PhD, Exposito-Alonso conducted a postdoctoral position in 2019 at the University of California, Berkeley in the Integrative Biology department with Rasmus Nielsen.

== Career and research ==
Exposito-Alonso's research includes the study of genetic and phenotypic basis of plant local adaptation to different climates using Arabidopsis thaliana as model system. His research combines large-scale common garden experiments and genome sequencing and CRISPR/Cas9 to study the consequence of gene edits in Arabidopsis. His research has been published in journals such as Nature (journal), Science (journal), Cell (journal), Evolution (journal), the Proceedings of the National Academy of Sciences of the United States of America and independent news media such as The Scientist (magazine) and El País.

Prior to joining the University of California, Berkeley, the Innovative Genomics Institute and Howard Hughes Medical Institute in 2024, Exposito-Alonso established his laboratory in 2019 as principal investigator in the Departments of Plant Biology and Global Ecology from the Carnegie Institution for Science and assistant professor at Stanford University.

=== Selected publications ===
1. Exposito-Alonso M., Booker T.R., Czech .L, Gillespie L., Hateley S., Kyriazis, C.C., Lang, P., Leventhal, L., Nogues-Bravo, D., Pagowski, V., Ruffley, M., Spence, J.P., Arana, S.T., Weiß, C., Zess, E. (2021) Genetic diversity loss in the Anthropocene. Science
2. 1001 Genomes Consortium§, (2016). 1,135 Genomes reveal the global pattern of polymorphism in Arabidopsis thaliana. Cell
3. Exposito-Alonso, M., Vasseur, F., Ding, W., Wang, G., Burbano, H.A., Weigel, D., (2018). Genomic basis and evolutionary potential for extreme drought adaptation in Arabidopsis thaliana. Nature Ecology and Evolution
4. Exposito-Alonso, M., 500 Genomes Field Experiment Team., Burbano, H.A. et al. Natural selection on the Arabidopsis thaliana genome in the present and future climates. Nature

== Awards and recognition ==
- 2019 Wilhelm Pfeffer Prize, German Society for Plant Sciences
- 2019 Leopoldina Prize for Junior Scientists, German National Academy of Sciences Leopoldina
- 2020 Loftus-Hill Young Investigator Prize, American Society of Naturalists
- 2020 Director's Early Independence Award, National Institutes of Health
- 2020 Karl-Freudenberg Award, Heidelberg Academy of Sciences and Humanities
- 2020 Director's Early Independence Award, National Institutes of Health
- 2020 Max Planck Society's Otto Hahn Medal
- 2020 Forbes 30 Under 30 in Science
- 2022 Tansley Medal, New Phytologist
- 2023 Early Career Faculty Award, American Society of Plant Biologists
- 2024 Premio Princesa de Girona, Fundación Princesa de Girona
