= Moisés Ferreira (footballer) =

Portuguese footballer

Moisés
Personal information
- Full name: Moisés Costa Ferreira
- Date of birth: 22 October 1990 (age 36)
- Place of birth: Setúbal, Portugal
- Height: 1.80 m (5 ft 11 in)
- Position: Forward

Team information
- Current team: Oriental Dragon FC
- Number: 28

Youth career
- 1999–2002: Pinhalnovense
- 2002–2009: Vitória Setúbal

Senior career*
Years	Team	Apps	(Gls)
2009–2015	Vitória Setúbal	2	(0)
2009–2010	→ Sertanense (loan)	9	(1)
2010	→ Aljustrelense (loan)	13	(3)
2010–2011	→ Madalena (loan)	13	(0)
2011–2013	→ Casa Pia (loan)	52	(9)
2013–2014	→ Cova da Piedade (loan)	5	(0)
2014–2015	→ Pinhalnovense (loan)	10	(0)
2015	→ Cova da Piedade (loan)	11	(1)
2016	Torreense	10	(0)
2016–2017	Fabril	29	(6)
2017–2018	Barreirense	21	(6)
2018–	Oriental Dragon FC	35	(5)
- * Club domestic league appearances and goals as of 20:18, 9 May 2020 (UTC)

Moisés Costa Ferreira (born 22 October 1990, in Setúbal) is a Portuguese professional footballer who plays for Oriental Dragon FC as a forward.
