= Redecilla del Camino =

Coordinates: 42°26′N 3°04′W

- Municipality and town
- Flag Coat of arms
- Interactive map of Redecilla del Camino
- Country: Spain
- Autonomous community: Castile and León
- Province: Burgos
- Comarca: Montes de Oca

Area
  - Total: 12.10 km^{2} (4.67 sq mi)
- Elevation: 741 m (2,431 ft)

Population (2025-01-01)
  - Total: 98
  - Density: 8.1/km^{2} (21/sq mi)
- Time zone: UTC+1 (CET)
  - Summer (DST): UTC+2 (CEST)
- Postal code: 09259
- Website: http://www.redecilladelcamino.es/

Redecilla del Camino is a municipality and town located in the province of Burgos, Castile and León, Spain. According to the 2004 census (INE), the municipality has a population of 148 inhabitants.

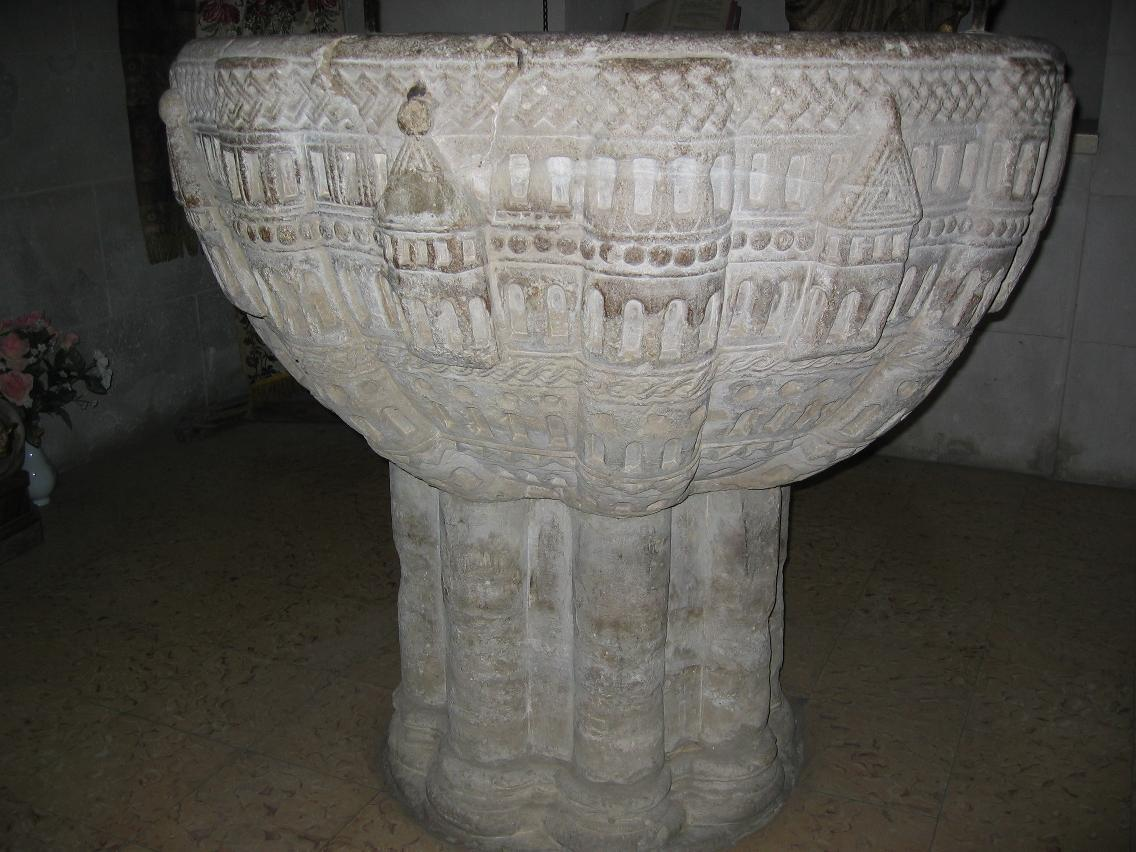
Romanesque baptismal font in Redecilla del Camino
