= Moisés (footballer, born 1948) =

Brazilian footballer & manager (1948–2008)

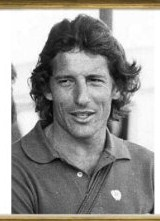

Personal information
- Full name: Moisés Matias de Andrade
- Date of birth: January 10, 1948
- Place of birth: Resende, Brazil
- Date of death: August 26, 2008 (aged 60)
- Place of death: Rio de Janeiro, Brazil
- Position: Defender

Senior career*
Years	Team	Apps	(Gls)
1966–1968	Bonsucesso		
1968	Flamengo		
1968	Bonsucesso		
1969–1971	Botafogo		
1971–1976	Vasco da Gama	220	(3)
1976–1978	Corinthians	122	(0)
1978	Paris Saint-Germain		
1978	Flamengo		
1979	Fluminense		
1979	Portuguesa de Desportos		
1980–1983	Bangu		

International career
1973	Brazil		

Managerial career
- 1983–1986: Bangu
- 1987: Santa Cruz
- 1987–1988: Ceará
- 1989: Atlético Mineiro
- 1991: Belenenses
- 1992–1993: América
- 1993: Ceará
- 1994: Bangu
- 2006: Cabofriense
- * Club domestic league appearances and goals

Moisés Matias de Andrade (January 10, 1948 – August 26, 2008), usually known simply as Moisés, was a professional footballer who played for several Campeonato Brasileiro Série A clubs.

== Playing career ==
Moisés was born in Resende, Rio de Janeiro state, on January 10, 1948, and started his career playing for Bonsucesso, then he moved to Flamengo in 1968, and returned in the same year to Bonsucesso. He played for Botafogo between 1969 and the beginning of 1971, participating in the 1968 Taça Brasil title, this edition of the championship that continued throughout 1969, and played from 1971 to 1976 for Vasco, where he won the Campeonato Brasileiro Série A in 1974. He then moved to Corinthians, helping the club win the Campeonato Paulista in 1977, bringing to an end the club's 23 years without winning the state championship. He played 122 games for Corinthians. Moisés briefly played for Paris Saint-Germain of France, before returning to Brazil to play again for Flamengo and was part of the 1978 Rio champion squad. In 1979, he played for Fluminense and in the same year he had a quick stint at Portuguesa de Desportos, then he moved to Bangu in the following year, retiring in 1983.

== International career ==
Moisés played one game for the Brazilian team, against the Soviet Union, on June 21, 1973, at Luzhniki Stadium, Moscow.

== Managerial career ==
After retiring, Moisés started a managerial career. He was Bangu's head coach when the club finished as the Campeonato Brasileiro Série A runner-up in 1985, as well as that year's Campeonato Carioca runner-up. Besides managing Bangu, he was also manager of several other clubs, such as Santa Cruz, Ceará, Atlético Mineiro, América and Belenenses, of Portugal. In 2008, he worked as Cabofriense's management coordinator.

== Death ==
Moisés died on August 26, 2008, in Rio de Janeiro, of lung cancer. He was buried at Cemitério São João Batista, in Botafogo neighborhood, Rio de Janeiro.

== Career honors ==
Botafogo

- Taça Brasil de 1968: 1969
- Troféu Triangular de Caracas: 1970

Vasco da Gama

- Campeonato Brasileiro: 1974
- Taça José de Albuquerque: 1972
- Torneio Quadrangular do Rio de Janeiro: 1973
- Troféu Pedro Novaes: 1973
- Torneio Erasmo Martins Pedro: 1973
- Taça Oscar Wright da Silva: 1974
- Taça Danilo Leal Carneiro: 1975
- Taça Cidade de Cabo Frio: 1975

Corinthians

- Campeonato Paulista: 1977
- Taça Gov. do Estado de São Paulo: 1977

Flamengo

- Campeonato Carioca: 1978
- Taça Guanabara: 1978

Bangu

- Taça Euzébio de Andrade: 1980
- Taça Governador Virgílio Távora (CE): 1982

== Prêmios ==
- Bola de Prata: 1981
- Seleção do Campeonato Brasileiro de 1981.
