= 1995 Vellore Fort jailbreak =

Jailbreak in Tamil Nadu, India

1995 Vellore Fort jailbreak was an escape from prison in Vellore, Tamil Nadu, India, on 15 August 1995. After digging a 153-foot-long (47 m) tunnel, 43 Liberation Tigers of Tamil Eelam militants escaped from the prison in the Vellore Fort. 21 of the escapees were re-captured within weeks of the escape.
