= Moisés Villarroel =

Moisés Villarroel may refer to:

- Moisés Villarroel (Chilean footballer) (born 1976), Chilean football manager and former midfielder
- Moisés Villarroel (Bolivian footballer) (born 1998), Bolivian football midfielder
