= Moysés =

Moysés (also spelled Moyses, Moyse, Moisés, or Moses) is a given name and surname of Hebrew origin, derived from מֹשֶׁה Moshe, the name of the biblical prophet Moses. The variant "Moisés" is the standard form in Portuguese and Spanish and a popular name, while "Moyse," "Moyses," and "Moyses" have been used in various historical and regional contexts, particularly among Sephardic Jews more often as a surname.The name functions both as a given name and a surname. Notable individuals with the name and last name include:

== Given name ==
- Moyses Alves (1930–1980), Brazilian footballer known as Zezinho
- Moysés Baumstein (1931–1991), Brazilian artist
- Moysés Blás (born 1937), Brazilian former basketball player
- Moysés Cardoso (born 1900), Portuguese sports shooter
- Moyses Chahon (1918–1981), Brazilian Army general
- Moyses Ferreira Alves (1930–1980), Brazilian footballer
- Moyses Hill (died 1629), English army officer who settled in Ireland
- Moysés Kuhlmann (1906–1972), Brazilian botanist
- Moysés Paciornik (1914–2008), Brazilian physician
- Moyses Szklo, Brazilian epidemiologist and physician scientist
- Moyses or Moses van Uyttenbroeck (c. 1600–1646), Dutch Golden Age painter and etcher

== Surname ==
- Chris Moyses (born 1965), English football coach and former player
- Herch Moysés Nussenzveig (1933–2022), Brazilian physicist, professor
- Ivone Moysés (1945–2018), Brazilian chess master
- José Álvaro Moisés (1945–2026), Brazilian political scientist, professor, journalist and writer
- Štefan Moyses (1797–1869), Slovak bishop

== See also ==
- Bicyclus moyses, butterfly in the family Nymphalidae
- Monochroa moyses, moth of the family Gelechiidae
- Moyse
