= Moisés Wolfenson =

Peruvian politician

Moisés Wolfenson Woloch (born November 23, 1966) is a former Peruvian congressman (2000-2001) who, together with his brother Alex, was convicted on embezzlement and conspiracy charges and sentenced on 15 February 2005 to 5 years in prison for being in charge of the "chicha press" during the government of ousted President Alberto Fujimori.

According to the lawsuit, during Fujimori's presidency, this "chicha press" highlighted the President's good works and tried to destroy his opponents with defamatory front-page headlines. This "chicha press," comprising about 15 sensationalist newspapers, followed instructions of the former head of the National Intelligence Service, Vladimiro Montesinos. The idea, carried out with success, was to maintain popular approval of Fujimori's government by destroying political opposition candidates and politicians. Once Fujimori resigned, many of the newspapers closed, but some, such as La Razón and El Chino survived. La Razón', still owned by Moises Wolfenson, opposes President Alejandro Toledo's government, and it is said that is now the main platform and vehicle for Fujimori's messages from Japan. "La Razón" contends that the Wolfensons were convicted without sufficient proof and that their sentence is in effect political revenge.

According to a report on Human Rights Practices, by the U.S. Department of State's Bureau of Democracy, Human Rights, and Labor, released March 31, 2003, In May 2002, Toledo's government authorities placed the Wolfenson brothers, publishers of pro-Fujimori tabloid El Chino and of opposition daily La Razón, under house arrest on corruption charges. On June 22 of the same year, a radio station broadcast a tape in which Salomon Lerner Ghitis, the chairman of the government-owned Financial Corporation for Development and a government insider, threatened both Alex and Moises with judicial proceedings and jail time should they continue to criticize the Government. On August 1, an anticorruption judge found the daily newspapers El Men, El Tio and Editora Sport, S.A., the company that published opposition dailies La Razón and El Chino, guilty of corporate embezzlement for the dealings their publishers Jose Olaya and Moises Wolfenson had with Vladimiro Montesinos. In September of the same year a court ratified the house arrest for the Wolfenson brothers.

In July 2005, congress issued a controversial law # 28658, which stated that days spent under house arrest could count as days in jail, so Moises and his brother Alex were freed. However, on July 25, 2005, Mr. Wolfenson presented himself to the Supreme Court first penal transitory court, because the Constitutional Tribunal declared unconstitutional and abolished law 28658 after only one week of having been issued law by congress, so the Supreme court ordered the Wolfenson brothers to come again to be jailed. Before entering jail, Moises declared that he considers himself persecuted politically by the current government.
