= Moisés López =

Moisés López may refer to:

- Moisés López (cyclist) (born 1940), Mexican Olympic cyclist
- Moisés López (wrestler) (born 1941), Mexican Olympic wrestler
- Moisés Elías López (born 1989), Honduran footballer for C.D. Real de Minas
- Moisés López, musician with the band Fuerza Regida
