= Corporales =

- Municipality
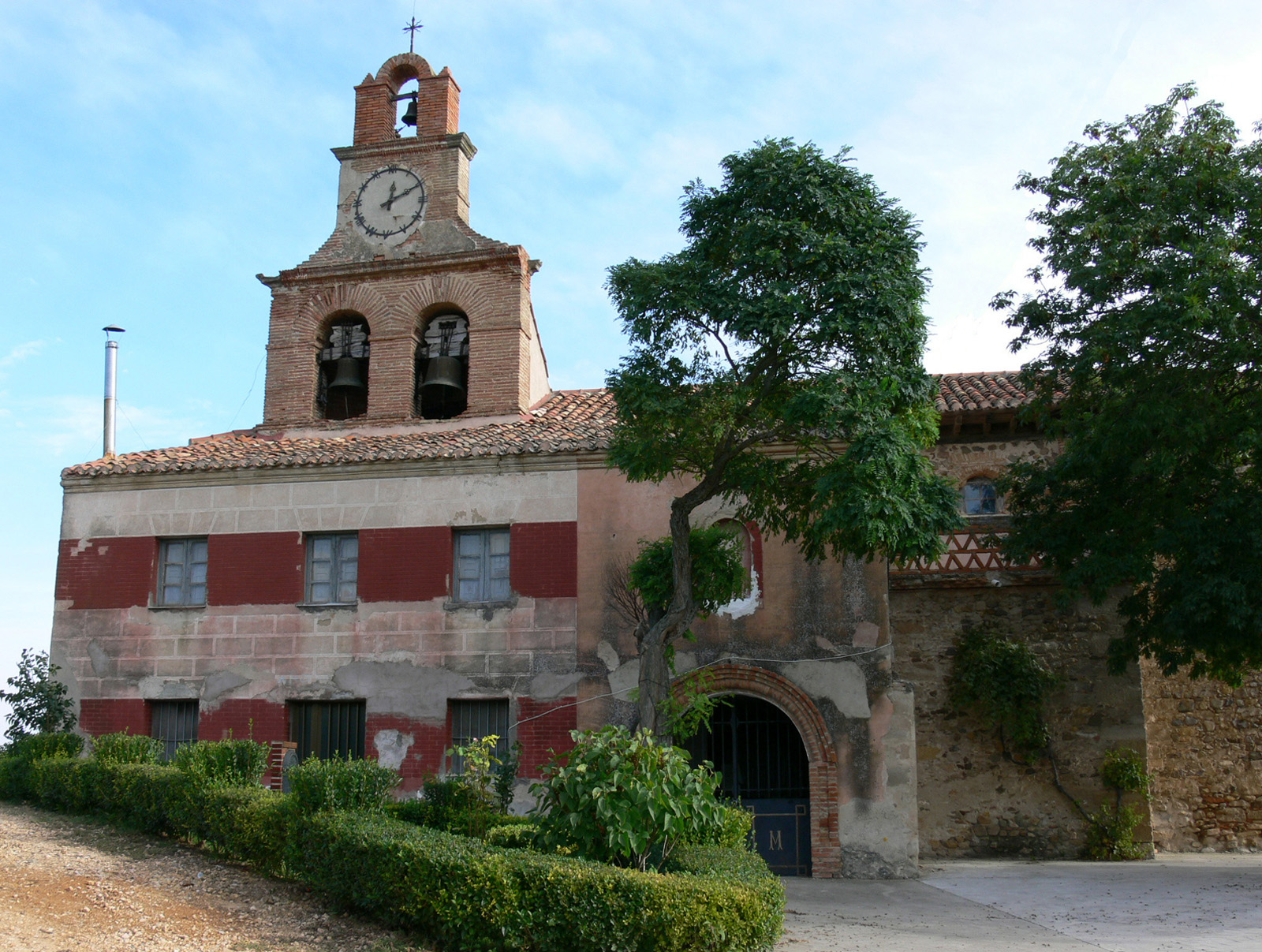
- Church of San Martín de Tours

- Location within La Rioja, Spain Location within Spain
- Coordinates: 42°25′57″N 2°59′42″W
- Country: Spain
- Autonomous community: La Rioja
- Comarca: Santo Domingo de la Calzada

Government
  - Mayor: José Miguel Jorge Sagredo (PP)

Area
  - Total: 8.41 km^{2} (3.25 sq mi)
- Elevation: 734 m (2,408 ft)

Population (2025-01-01)
  - Total: 40
- Demonym(s): corporalejo, ja
- Postal code: 26259

Corporales is a village in the province and autonomous community of La Rioja, Spain. The municipality covers an area of 8.41 square kilometres (3.25 sq mi) and as of 2011 had a population of 45 people.
