= Moises Teixeira da Silva =

Moises Teixeira da Silva is a convicted robber who escaped São Paulo, Brazil's Carandiru prison with about 100 others through a tunnel in 2001. He was serving a 25-year sentence at the time.

Since his escape, Moisés is suspected of masterminding two major bank robberies in Brazil in 2005. In the second, Moisés and his fellow thieves allegedly dug a 78-meter (256 ft) long tunnel from a rented house to Fortaleza's Central Bank's vault in Brazil, stealing €54.8m ($67.8m).
