= Comarca de Santo Domingo de la Calzada =

Santo Domingo de la Calzada
- Comarca
- Interactive map of Santo Domingo de la Calzada
- Coordinates: 42.453854°N 2.970295°W
- Country: Spain

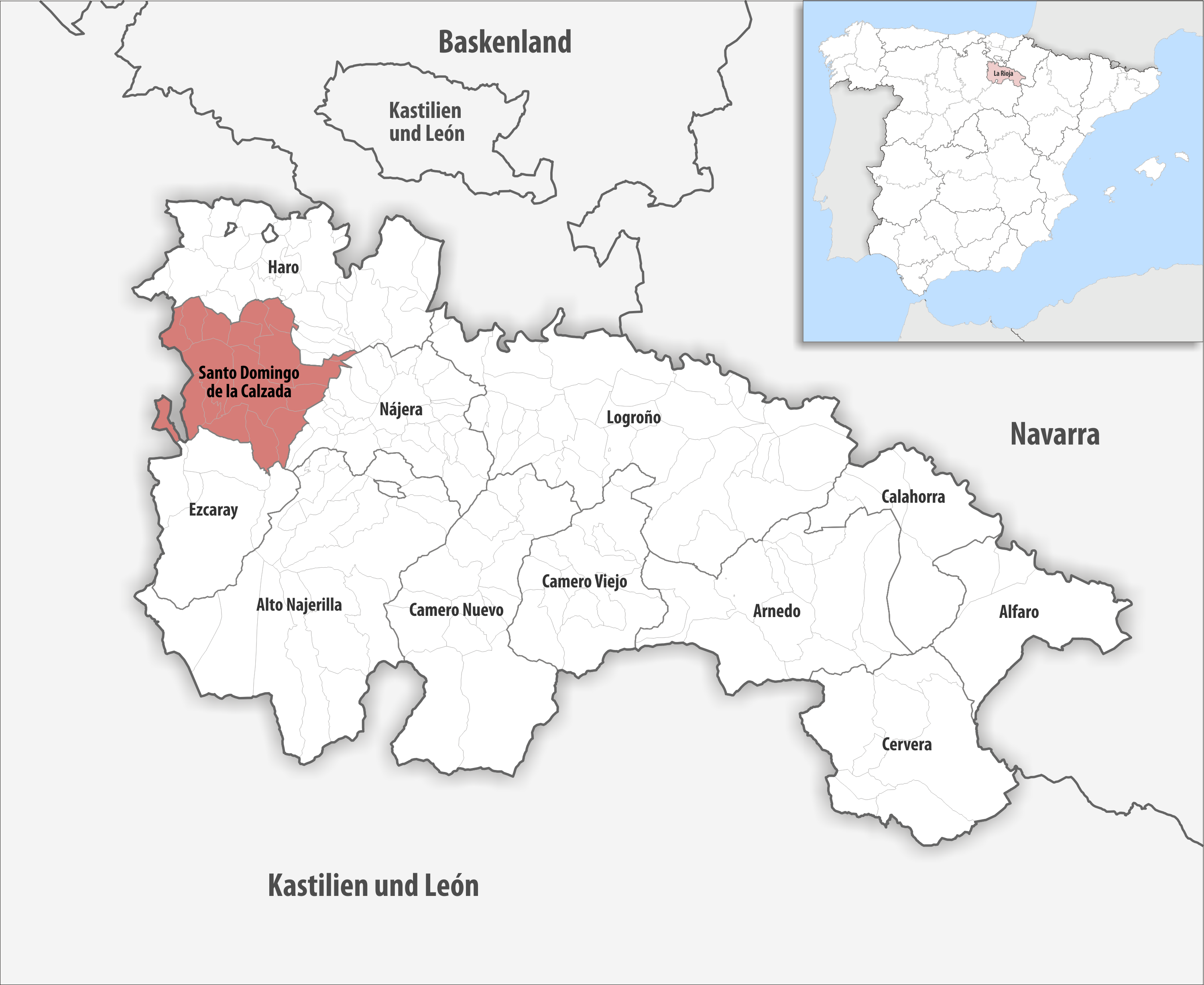
Santo Domingo de la Calzada Region

Santo Domingo de la Calzada is a comarca in La Rioja province in Spain.
