= List of Clube Atlético Mineiro managers =

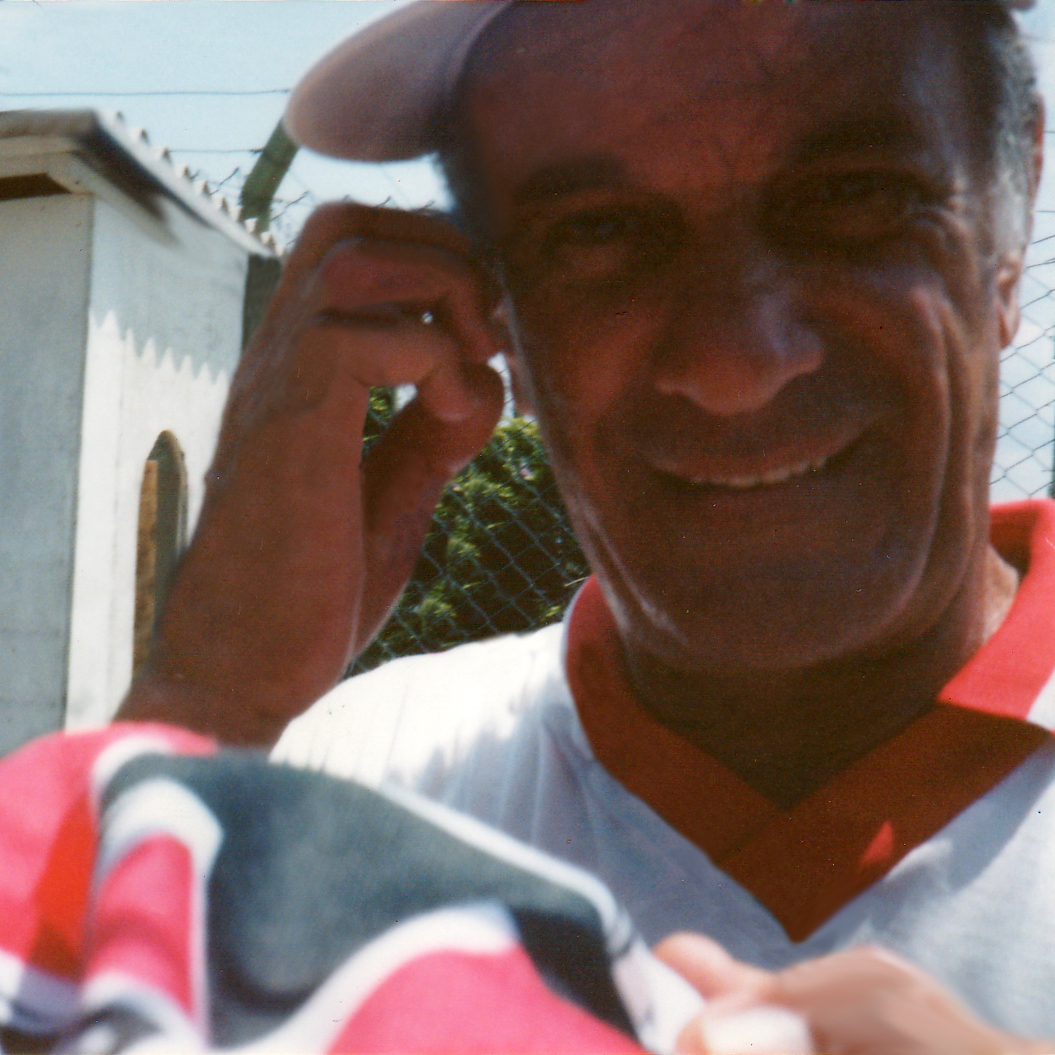
Telê Santana is Atlético Mineiro's longest serving manager, with 434 matches in three spells in charge of the club.

Clube Atlético Mineiro is a Brazilian professional football club based in Belo Horizonte, Minas Gerais, Brazil. The club has played in the Brasileirão, the top tier of the Brazilian football league system, throughout all of its history with the exception of one season, as well as in all editions of the Campeonato Mineiro, the premier state league of Minas Gerais, while also taking part in numerous CONMEBOL-organised international competitions.

This chronological list comprises those who have held the position of head coach of the first team of Atlético Mineiro since 1926, the date of the first available data for a club manager. Each manager's entry includes his years of tenure, honours won and significant achievements while under his care, where available. Caretaker managers are included, where known. As of 2026, Atlético Mineiro has had 91 known full-time managers.

The first known full-time manager for Atlético Mineiro was Chico Neto, who managed the club in 1926. Cuca holds the record for most trophies won, with seven. Telê Santana is the club's longest-serving manager, with 434 matches during three periods in the 1970s and 1980s.

== List of managers ==
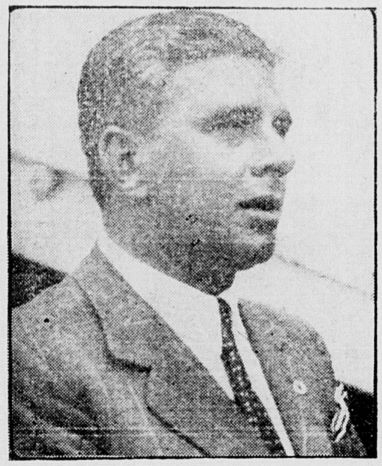
Uruguayan Ricardo Diéz had various stints with Atlético, winning three Campeonato Mineiro titles and coaching the club in the 1950 European tour

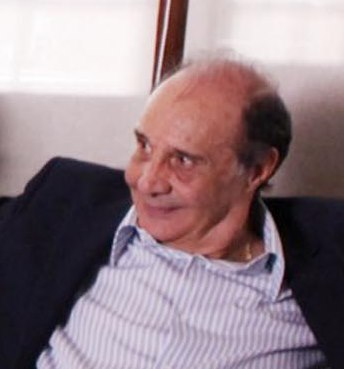
Procópio Cardoso managed the club in 328 matches, winning a Copa CONMEBOL and three Campeonato Mineiros

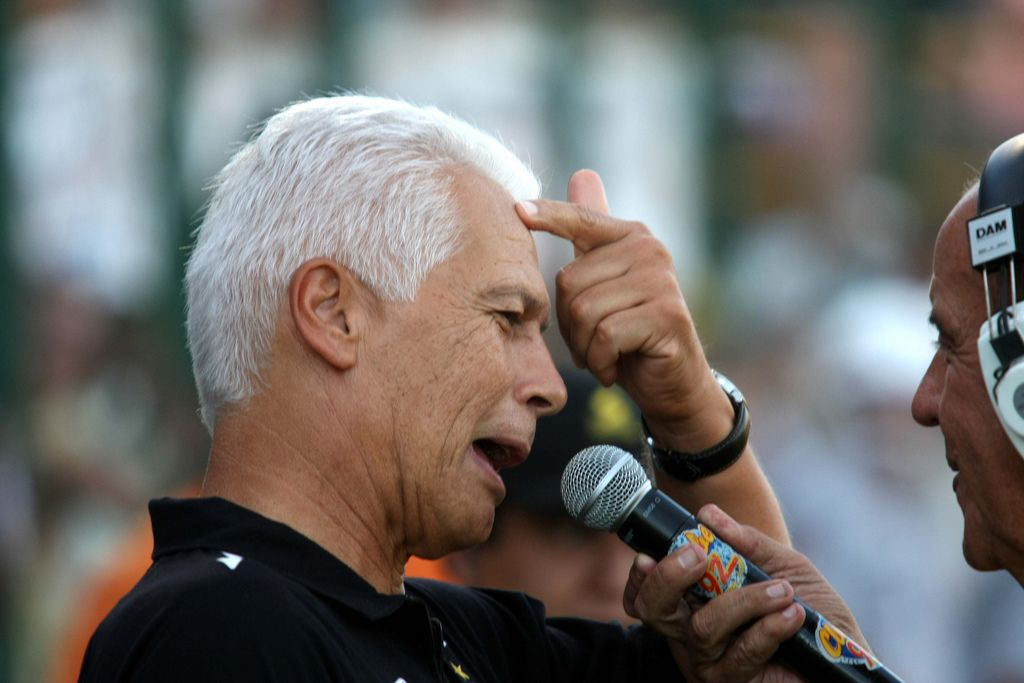
Émerson Leão coached the club in the 1990s and 2000s, winning a Copa CONMEBOL in 1997

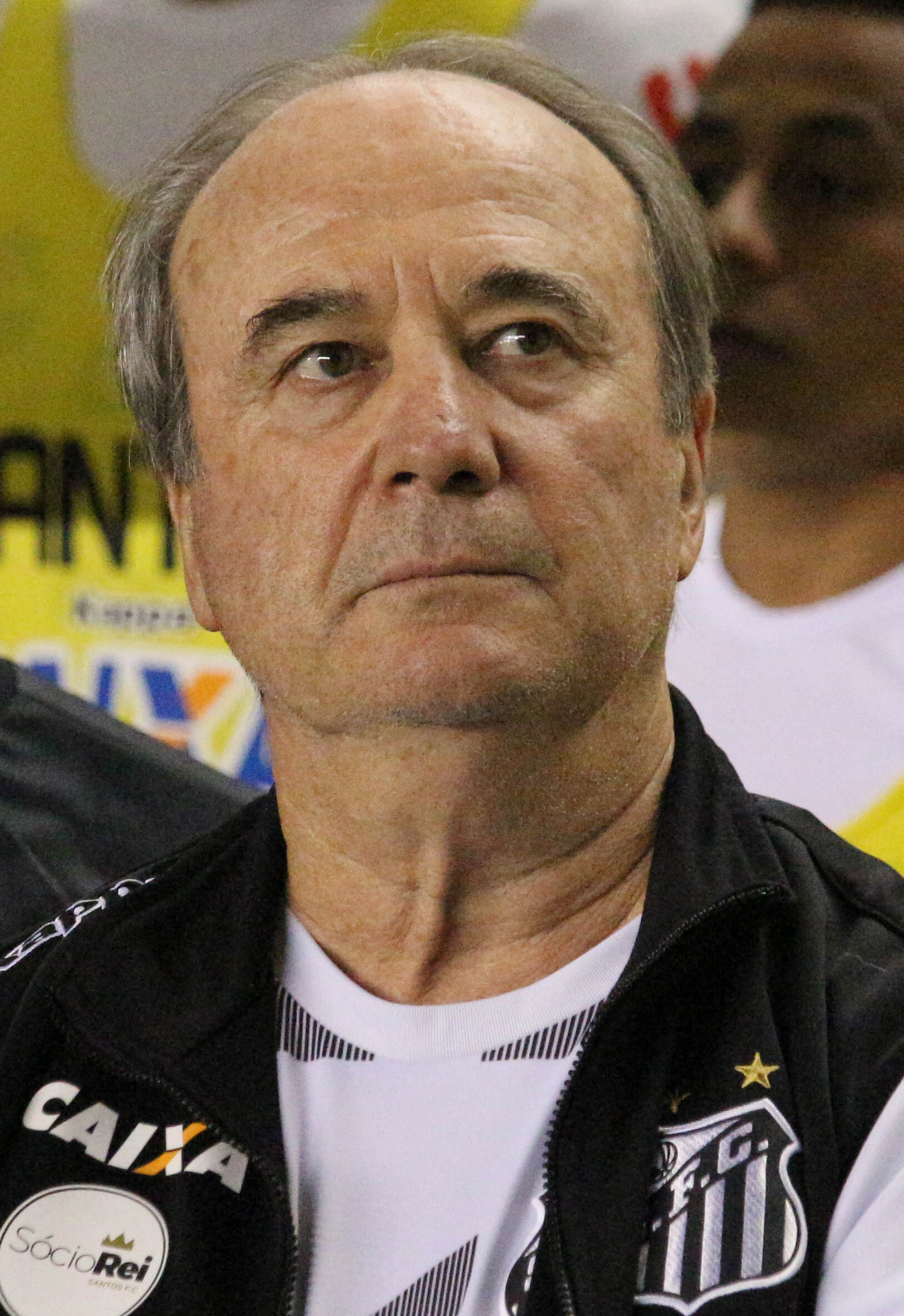
Levir Culpi coached Atlético in 320 matches and won six titles

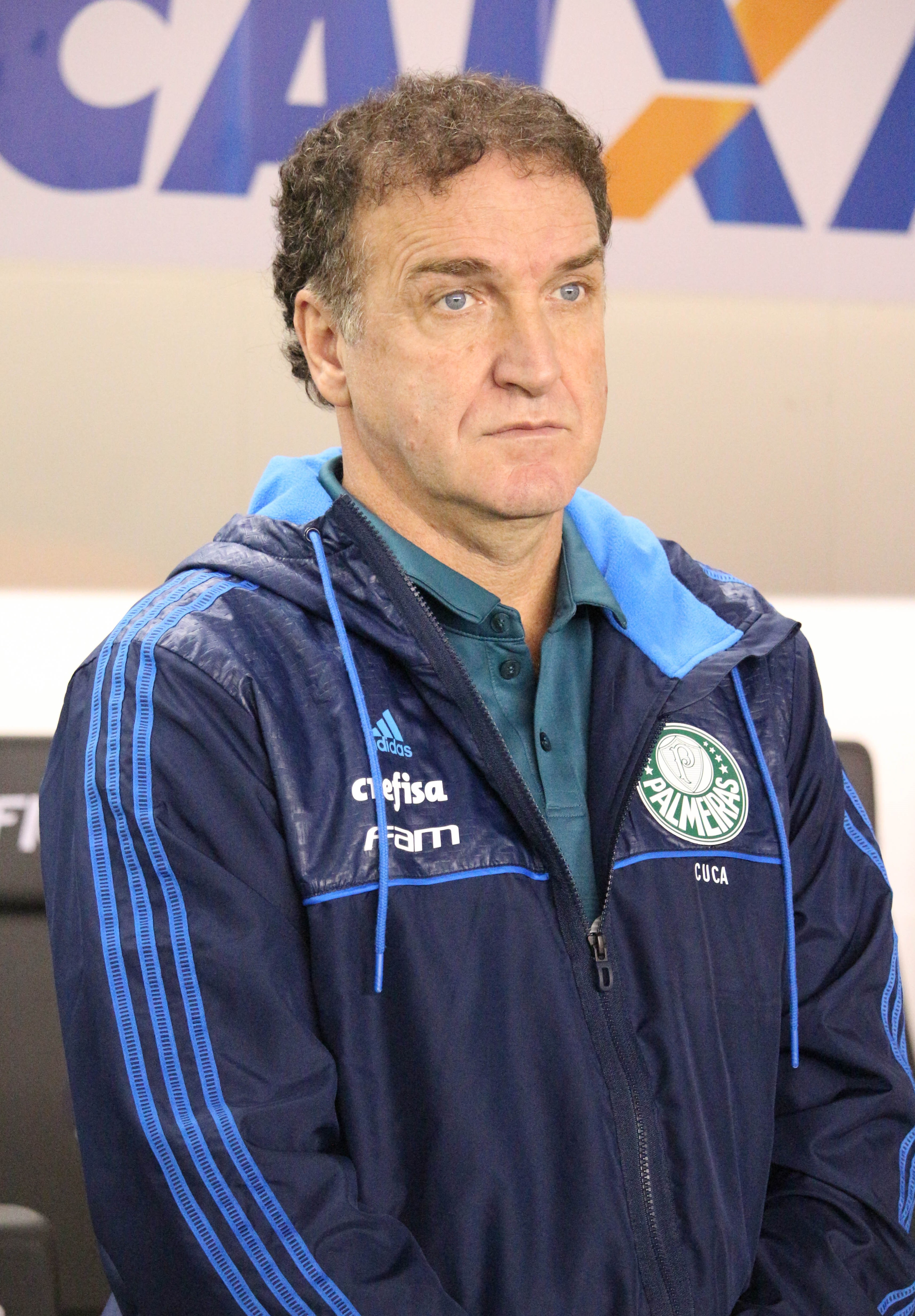
Cuca won the 2013 Copa Libertadores and the 2021 Série A

Italics denote a caretaker manager.

| Name | Nationality | From | To | Honours |
|---|---|---|---|---|
| Chico Netto | Brazil | 1926 | 1929 | 2 Campeonato Mineiro |
| Jenő Medgyessy | Hungary | 1928 | 1931 | |
| Ivo Melo | Brazil | 1931 | 1933 | 2 Campeonato Mineiro |
| Floriano Peixoto Corrêa | Brazil | 1934 | 1936 | |
| Said | Brazil | 1936 | 1936 | 1 Campeonato Mineiro |
| Floriano Peixoto Corrêa | Brazil | 1937 | 1937 | 1 Copa dos Campeões Estaduais |
| Hummel Guimarães | Brazil | 1937 | 1938 | 1 Campeonato Mineiro |
| Ewando Becker | Brazil | 1938 | 1939 | 1 Campeonato Mineiro |
| Said | Brazil | 1939 | 1941 | |
| Gregório Suárez | Argentina | 1944 | 1944 | |
| Said | Brazil | 1944 | 1945 | |
| Ewando Becker | Brazil | 1945 | 1945 | |
| Félix Magno | Uruguay | 1946 | 1948 | 1 Campeonato Mineiro |
| Darío Letona | Peru | 1947 | 1947 | |
| Ayrton Moreira | Brazil | 1949 | 1949 | |
| Chico Trindade | Brazil | 1949 | 1949 | |
| Ricardo Diéz | Uruguay | 1950 | 1951 | 1 Campeonato Mineiro; 1950 European Tour |
| Abdo Arges | Brazil | 1951 | 1951 | |
| Yustrich | Brazil | 1951 | 1953 | 2 Campeonato Mineiro |
| Martim Francisco | Brazil | 1955 | 1955 | |
| Abdo Arges | Brazil | 1954 | 1954 | |
| Ondino Viera | Uruguay | 1954 | 1955 | |
| Ricardo Diéz | Uruguay | 1954 | 1956 | 3 Campeonato Mineiro |
| Said | Brazil | 1956 | 1956 | |
| Ewando Becker | Brazil | 1956 | 1956 | |
| Délio Neves | Brazil | 1957 | 1957 | |
| Paulo Benigno | Brazil | 1957 | 1958 | 1 Campeonato Mineiro |
| Ricardo Diéz | Uruguay | 1958 | 1959 | |
| Abdo Arges | Brazil | 1959 | 1959 | |
| Ayrton Moreira | Brazil | 1959 | 1959 | |
| Artur Nequessaurt | Brazil | 1959 | 1960 | |
| Ricardo Diéz | Uruguay | 1960 | 1960 | |
| Osni Pereira | Brazil | 1960 | 1961 | |
| Kafunga | Brazil | 1961 | 1962 | |
| Lucas Miranda | Brazil | 1962 | 1962 | 1 Campeonato Mineiro |
| Antoninho | Brazil | 1962 | 1963 | |
| Marão | Brazil | 1963 | 1964 | 1 Campeonato Mineiro |
| Martim Francisco | Brazil | 1964 | 1964 | |
| Afonso Silva | Brazil | 1964 | 1964 | |
| Marão | Brazil | 1964 | 1965 | |
| Wilson de Oliveira | Brazil | 1965 | 1965 | |
| Paulo Amaral | Brazil | 1966 | 1966 | |
| Gradim | Brazil | 1966 | 1966 | |
| Wilson de Oliveira | Brazil | 1966 | 1966 | |
| Barbatana | Brazil | 1966 | 1966 | |
| Válter Miraglia | Brazil | 1966 | 1966 | |
| Gérson dos Santos | Brazil | 1966 | 1967 | |
| Manuel Fleitas Solich | Paraguay | 1967 | 1968 | |
| Dequinha | Brazil | 1968 | 1968 | |
| Totinha | Brazil | 1968 | 1968 | |
| Haroldo Lopes | Brazil | 1968 | 1968 | |
| Yustrich | Brazil | 1968 | 1969 | |
| José Luís Barbosa | Brazil | 1969 | 1970 | |
| Mussula | Brazil | 1970 | 1970 | |
| Barbatana | Brazil | 1970 | 1970 | |
| Telê Santana | Brazil | 1970 | 1972 | 1 Campeonato Mineiro; 1 Campeonato Brasileiro Série A |
| Barbatana | Brazil | 1972 | 1972 | |
| Paulo Benigno | Brazil | 1973 | 1973 | |
| Sinval Martins | Brazil | 1973 | 1973 | |
| Telê Santana | Brazil | 1973 | 1975 | |
| Mussula | Brazil | 1975 | 1976 | |
| Barbatana | Brazil | 1976 | 1978 | 1 Campeonato Mineiro; 1 Copa dos Campeões Brasileiros |
| Mussula | Brazil | 1978 | 1978 | |
| Jorge Vieira | Brazil | 1978 | 1978 | |
| Procópio Cardoso | Brazil | 1978 | 1981 | 3 Campeonato Mineiro |
| Pepe | Brazil | 1981 | 1981 | |
| Carlos Alberto Silva | Brazil | 1981 | 1982 | 1 Campeonato Mineiro |
| Barbatana | Brazil | 1982 | 1982 | |
| Antônio Lacerda | Brazil | 1982 | 1982 | 1 Campeonato Mineiro |
| Paulinho de Almeida | Brazil | 1983 | 1983 | |
| Mussula | Brazil | 1983 | 1983 | 1 Campeonato Mineiro |
| Rubens Minelli | Brazil | 1984 | 1984 | |
| Procópio Cardoso | Brazil | 1984 | 1985 | |
| Vicente Lage | Brazil | 1985 | 1985 | |
| Walter Olivera | Uruguay | 1985 | 1985 | 1 Campeonato Mineiro |
| Ilton Chaves | Brazil | 1986 | 1987 | 1 Campeonato Mineiro |
| Palhinha | Brazil | 1987 | 1987 | |
| Telê Santana | Brazil | 1987 | 1988 | 1 Campeonato Mineiro |
| Vantuir | Brazil | 1988 | 1988 | |
| Paulinho de Almeida | Brazil | 1988 | 1988 | |
| Moisés | Brazil | 1989 | 1989 | |
| Jair Pereira | Brazil | 1989 | 1989 | 1 Campeonato Mineiro |
| Rui Guimarães | Brazil | 1990 | 1990 | |
| Arthur Bernardes | Brazil | 1990 | 1990 | |
| Jair Pereira | Brazil | 1991 | 1992 | 1 Campeonato Mineiro |
| Vantuir | Brazil | 1992 | 1992 | |
| Procópio Cardoso | Brazil | 1992 | 1992 | 1 Copa CONMEBOL |
| Nelinho | Brazil | 1993 | 1993 | |
| Vantuir | Brazil | 1993 | 1994 | |
| Valdir Espinosa | Brazil | 1994 | 1994 | |
| Levir Culpi | Brazil | 1994 | 1995 | 1 Campeonato Mineiro |
| Gaúcho | Brazil | 1995 | 1995 | |
| Procópio Cardoso | Brazil | 1995 | 1996 | |
| Eduardo Amorim | Brazil | 1996 | 1997 | |
| Émerson Leão | Brazil | 1997 | 1997 | 1 Copa CONMEBOL |
| Carlos Alberto Silva | Brazil | 1998 | 1998 | |
| Vantuir | Brazil | 1998 | 1998 | |
| Carlos Alberto Torres | Brazil | 1998 | 1998 | |
| Toninho Cerezo | Brazil | 1999 | 1999 | |
| Darío Pereyra | Uruguay | 1999 | 1999 | 1 Campeonato Mineiro |
| Humberto Ramos | Brazil | 1999 | 2000 | |
| João Francisco | Brazil | 2000 | 2000 | |
| Márcio Araújo | Brazil | 2000 | 2000 | |
| Carlos Alberto Parreira | Brazil | 2000 | 2000 | |
| Nedo Xavier | Brazil | 2000 | 2000 | |
| Abel Braga | Brazil | 2001 | 2001 | |
| Zé Maria | Brazil | 2001 | 2001 | |
| Levir Culpi | Brazil | 2001 | 2002 | |
| Marcelo Oliveira | Brazil | 2002 | 2002 | |
| Geninho | Brazil | 2002 | 2002 | |
| Celso Roth | Brazil | 2003 | 2003 | |
| Marcelo Oliveira | Brazil | 2003 | 2003 | |
| Procópio Cardoso | Brazil | 2003 | 2003 | |
| Paulo Bonamigo | Brazil | 2004 | 2004 | |
| Jair Picerni | Brazil | 2004 | 2004 | |
| Mário Sérgio | Brazil | 2004 | 2004 | |
| Procópio Cardoso | Brazil | 2004 | 2005 | |
| Tite | Brazil | 2005 | 2005 | |
| Marco Aurelio | Brazil | 2005 | 2005 | |
| Lori Sandri | Brazil | 2005 | 2006 | |
| Marcelo Oliveira | Brazil | 2006 | 2006 | |
| Levir Culpi | Brazil | 2006 | 2007 | 1 Campeonato Brasileiro Série B 1 Campeonato Mineiro |
| Tico dos Santos | Brazil | 2007 | 2007 | |
| Zetti | Brazil | 2007 | 2007 | |
| Marcelo Oliveira | Brazil | 2007 | 2007 | |
| Émerson Leão | Brazil | 2007 | 2007 | |
| Geninho | Brazil | 2008 | 2008 | |
| Marcelo Oliveira | Brazil | 2008 | 2008 | |
| Alexandre Gallo | Brazil | 2008 | 2008 | |
| Marcelo Oliveira | Brazil | 2008 | 2008 | |
| Émerson Leão | Brazil | 2009 | 2009 | |
| Celso Roth | Brazil | 2009 | 2009 | |
| Vanderlei Luxemburgo | Brazil | 2010 | 2010 | 1 Campeonato Mineiro |
| Dorival Júnior | Brazil | 2010 | 2011 | |
| Cuca | Brazil | 2011 | 2013 | 2 Campeonato Mineiro; 1 Copa Libertadores |
| Paulo Autuori | Brazil | 2014 | 2014 | |
| Levir Culpi | Brazil | 2014 | 2015 | 1 Recopa Sudamericana; 1 Copa do Brasil; 1 Campeonato Mineiro |
| Diogo Giacomini | Brazil | 2015 | 2015 | |
| Diego Aguirre | Uruguay | 2016 | 2016 | |
| Marcelo Oliveira | Brazil | 2016 | 2016 | |
| Diogo Giacomini | Brazil | 2016 | 2016 | |
| Roger | Brazil | 2017 | 2017 | 1 Campeonato Mineiro |
| Diogo Giacomini | Brazil | 2017 | 2017 | |
| Rogério Micale | Brazil | 2017 | 2017 | |
| Oswaldo de Oliveira | Brazil | 2017 | 2018 | |
| Thiago Larghi | Brazil | 2018 | 2018 | |
| Levir Culpi | Brazil | 2018 | 2019 | |
| Rodrigo Santana | Brazil | 2019 | 2019 | |
| Vágner Mancini | Brazil | 2019 | 2019 | |
| Rafael Dudamel | Venezuela | 2020 | 2020 | |
| James Freitas | Brazil | 2020 | 2020 | |
| Jorge Sampaoli | Argentina | 2020 | 2021 | 1 Campeonato Mineiro |
| Lucas Gonçalves | Brazil | 2021 | 2021 | |
| Cuca | Brazil | 2021 | 2021 | 1 Campeonato Brasileiro Série A 1 Copa do Brasil; 1 Campeonato Mineiro |
| Antonio Mohamed | Argentina | 2022 | 2022 | 1 Supercopa do Brasil; 1 Campeonato Mineiro |
| Lucas Gonçalves | Brazil | 2022 | 2022 | |
| Cuca | Brazil | 2022 | 2022 | |
| Eduardo Coudet | Argentina | 2023 | 2023 | 1 Campeonato Mineiro |
| Luiz Felipe Scolari | Brazil | 2023 | 2024 | |
| Gabriel Milito | Argentina | 2024 | 2024 | 1 Campeonato Mineiro |
| Lucas Gonçalves | Brazil | 2024 | 2024 | |
| Cuca | Brazil | 2025 | 2025 | 1 Campeonato Mineiro |
| Lucas Gonçalves | Brazil | 2025 | 2025 | |
| Jorge Sampaoli | Argentina | 2025 | 2026 | |
| Lucas Gonçalves | Brazil | 2026 | 2026 | |
| Eduardo Domínguez | Argentina | 2026 | | |

== Records ==
=== Most games managed ===
The following are the managers with the most matches in charge of the club.

| Name | Matches | Trophies |
|---|---|---|
| (Brazil) Telê Santana | 434 | Brasileirão, 2 Campeonato Mineiro |
| (Brazil) Procópio Cardoso | 328 | Copa CONMEBOL, 3 Campeonato Mineiro |
| (Brazil) Levir Culpi | 320 | Recopa Sudamericana, Copa do Brasil, 3 Campeonato Mineiro, Série B |
| (Brazil) Cuca | 290 | Copa Libertadores, Brasileirão, Copa do Brasil, 4 Campeonato Mineiro |
| (Brazil) Barbatana | 227 | 3 Campeonato Mineiro |
| (Uruguay) Ricardo Diéz | 171 | 3 Campeonato Mineiro |
