= Vava =

Vava may refer to:

== People ==
- Vavá (1934–2002), full name Edvaldo Izidio Neto, Brazilian football striker
- Vavá (footballer, born 1929), full name Walter José Pereira, Brazilian football striker
- Vavá (footballer, born 1932), full name Osvaldo Simplício, Brazilian football defender
- Vavá II (born 1944), Spanish retired footballer
- Vava Suresh (born 1974), Indian wildlife conservationist and snake expert
- Vavá (footballer, born 1976), full name Marcelo Gonçalves Vieira, Brazilian football striker
- Fedy Vava (born 1982), Vanuatuan football defender
- Vavá Pequeno (born 1994), full name Edley Dos Anjos Pereira Montoia, Santomean football defender
- Vava (rapper) (born 1995), full name Mao Yanqi, Chinese rapper

== Places ==
- Vava (Babušnica), municipality of Babušnica, Serbia
- Ulakhan-Vava (Big Vava), river in Yakutia, Russia

== Other uses ==
- Vava II, superyacht owned by Ernesto Bertarelli
