= History of Clube Atlético Mineiro =

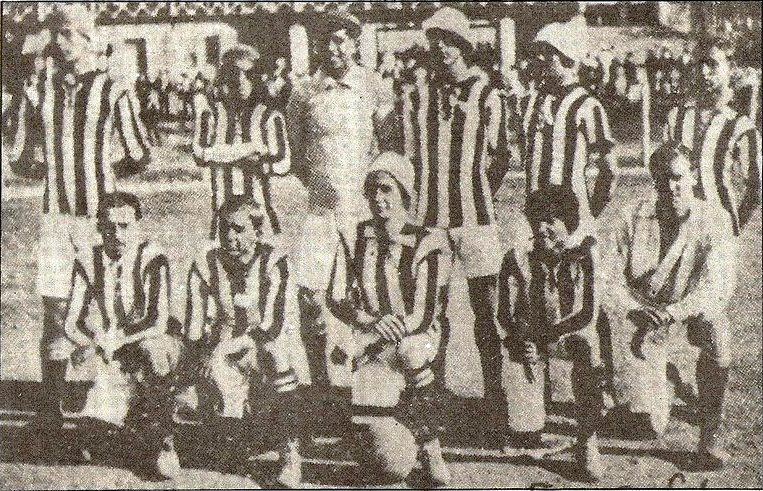
The Atlético Mineiro team that won the inaugural Campeonato Mineiro in 1915

Clube Atlético Mineiro, also known simply as Atlético Mineiro or Atlético, is a club from Belo Horizonte, Minas Gerais, Brazil. The club's history starts in its founding, in 1908, up to present day. The team was founded on 25 March 25, 1908 by twenty-two students from Belo Horizonte, led by Margival Mendes Leal and Mário Toledo.

Since 1915, the club has competed in the Campeonato Mineiro, the state league of Minas Gerais, which it has won a record 43 times. In 1937, the club won its first title at national level, the Copa dos Campeões Estaduais. In 1950, Atlético went into a European tour, an important event in the club's history and, at the time, for Brazilian football itself. During that tour, the team was awarded the title commonly known as "The Ice Champions".

Since the inception of regular national club competitions in Brazil in 1959, the club has played in the Campeonato Brasileiro Série A, the top tier of the Brazilian football league system, throughout most of its history, and has won the competition once, in 1971, finished in second place in four occasions. In the 1970s, it also won the Copa dos Campeões Brasileiros in 1978.

Having taken part in international club competitions since 1972, the club's first title at that level was the 1992 Copa CONMEBOL, the inaugural edition of the competition, which it also won in 1997. After managerial and financial crisis originated in the 1990s, Atlético experienced relegation for the first and only time in its history in 2005, but returned to the first division in 2007. Since then, the club has won the Copa Libertadores in 2013, and the Recopa Sudamericana and the Copa do Brasil in 2014. In 2021, Atletico won both national titles: the Campeonato Brasileiro 2021 and the Copa do Brasil 2021. In 2022 they also won the Supercopa do Brasil 2022 against the 2021 Brasileirao runner-up flamengo.

== Foundation and early years (1908–1949) ==
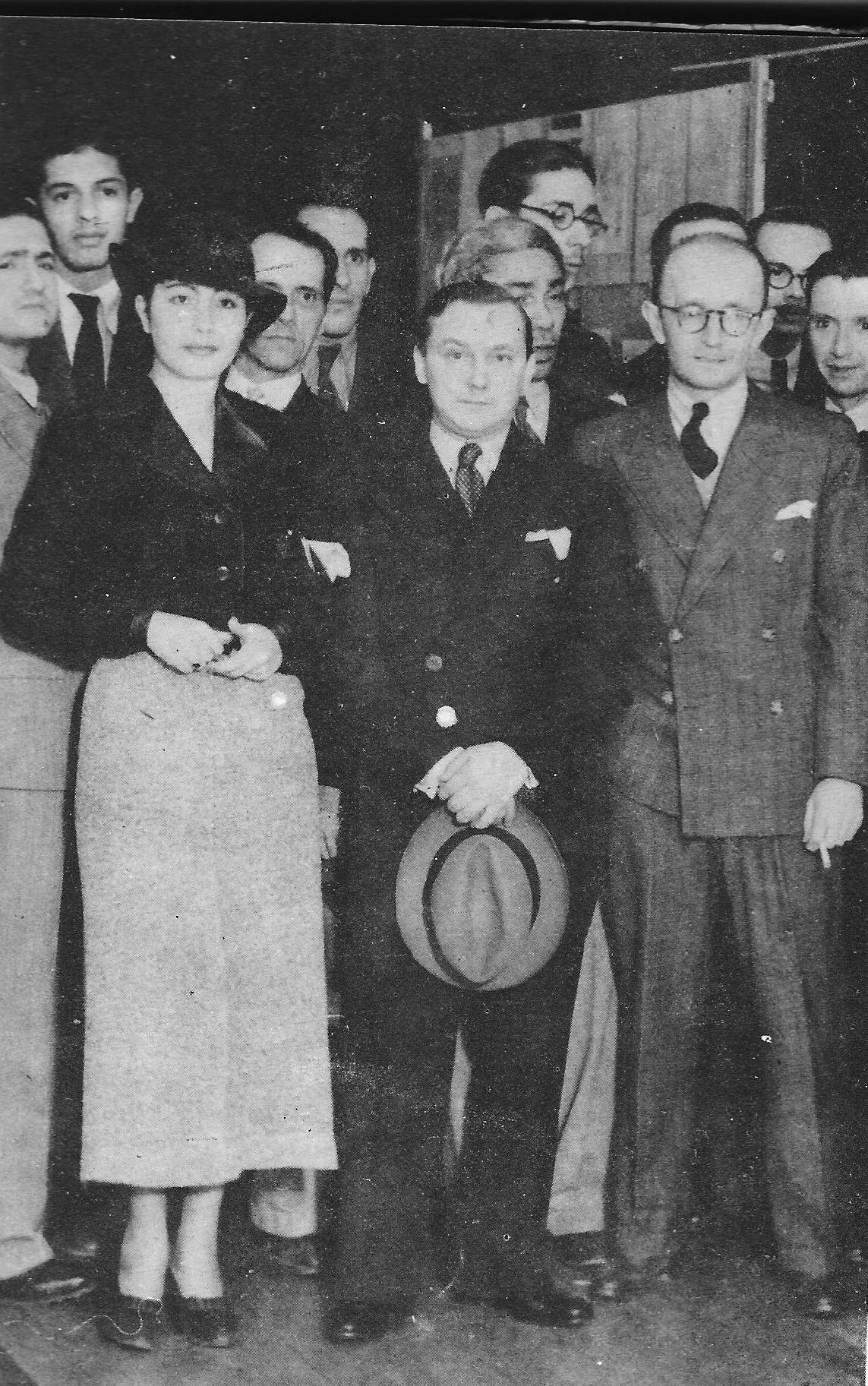
Aníbal Machado (front, right), a Brazilian writer, scored Atlético Mineiro's first goal.

Clube Atlético Mineiro was founded on March 25, 1908 by twenty-two students from Belo Horizonte. The founding players were: Aleixanor Alves Pereira, Antônio Antunes Filho, Augusto Soares, Benjamin Moss Filho, Carlos Marciel, Eurico Catão, Horácio Machado, Hugo Francarolli, Humberto Moreira, João Barbosa Sobrinho, José Soares Alves, Júlio Menezes Melo, Leônidas Fulgêncio, Margival Mendes Leal, Mário Hermanson Lott, Mário Neves, Mário Toledo, Raul Fracarolli and Sinval Moreira. Three other young men were not present in the founding meeting, but are also considered as founders of the club: Francisco Monteiro, Jorge Dias Pena and Mauro Brochado. The founders decided that the club's name would be Athletico Mineiro Foot Ball Club.

Atlético's first match was against Sport Club Foot Ball, the biggest and oldest club in Belo Horizonte at the time. The match was played on 21 March 1909, and Atlético won 3–0; the first goal was scored by Aníbal Machado. Sport's board demanded that Atlético play a rematch the following week to get revenge, to which Atlético agreed, and won again, this time by 4–0. Despite having liberal, upper-class students, from an early age the club opened its doors to players from every social class, nationality or ethnicity, which earned it a "people's club" status in Belo Horizonte and in the state.

In 1913, the club officially changed its name from Athletico Mineiro Foot Ball Club to Clube Atlético Mineiro. The following year, in 1914, Atlético won its first championship, the Taça Bueno Brandão, the first competition ever held in the state of Minas Gerais, contested between Atlético, América and Yale. In 1915, the club won the inaugural edition of the Campeonato Mineiro, the state league of Minas Gerais, then organised by the Liga Mineira de Sports Athléticos, which would later become the Federação Mineira de Futebol.

América won the next ten editions of the Mineiro, and Atlético only won the league again in 1926, led by striker Mário de Castro. In 1927, forwards Said and Jairo joined Castro to form an attacking partnership nicknamed the Trio Maldito ("Unholy Trio"), which guided Atlético to another state league triumph. The team was headed by Hungarian coach Jenő Medgyessy. In 1929, the club played its first international encounter against Vitória de Setúbal. The team won 3–1 in a match played at the Presidente Antônio Carlos Stadium, which had opened earlier that year and which would be the club's home ground for the following two decades.

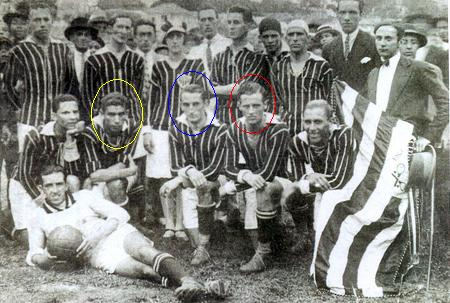
The Trio Maldito (circled): Said, Jairo and Mário de Castro, from left to right.

Castro was the first Atlético played to be called up to the Brazilian national team, in 1929, but refused because the Brazilian Football Confederation indicated he was to serve as reserve to another player, with which he disagreed. Together, the Trio Maldito together scored more than 450 goals for Atlético.

Atlético won the state league in 1931 and 1932, before becoming a professional club in 1933. After another Campeonato Mineiro triumph in 1936, Atlético won its first title at national level in 1937. This was the 1937 Copa dos Campeões Estaduais, which was organised by the Federação Brasileira de Foot-Ball, the federation for professional clubs that would later merge into the Brazilian Sports Confederation (CBD). The competition was contested by the 1936 state league champions from Minas Gerais (Atlético), Rio de Janeiro (Fluminense), São Paulo (Portuguesa) and Espírito Santo (Rio Branco). Atlético defeated the latter 5–1 in the final match, played at the Antônio Carlos stadium. The main responsibles for the achievement were Zezé Procópio, goalkeeper Kafunga and Guará. The title was followed by two more Campeonato Mineiro victories, in 1938 and 1939.

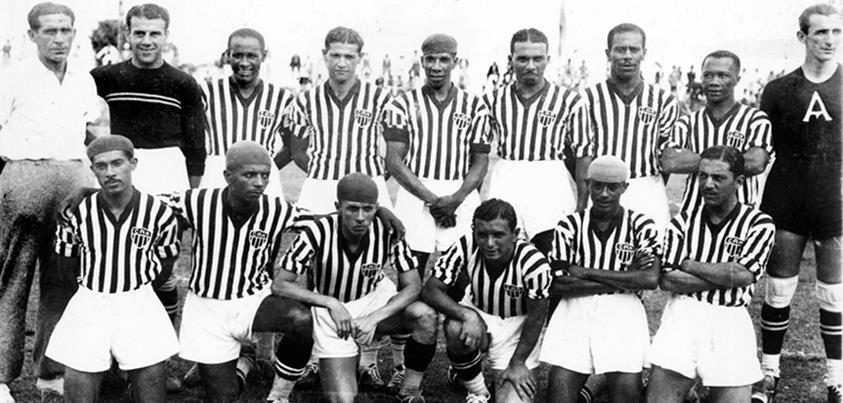
The 1937 Copa dos Campeões Estaduais winning squad.

Success continued in the 1940s, with a squad that included Bigode (international in the 1950 FIFA World Cup), Murilo Silva, Carlyle, Lucas Miranda, Nívio Gabrich and Kafunga. The club was dominant in the state as it won the league in 1941, 1942, 1946, 1947 and 1949. Although América had been Atlético's long-standing adversary, a new rivalry started to develop with Cruzeiro in the 1940s, as it became Galo's main challenger during this period.

== European tour and the start of the Mineirão era (1950–1969) ==
In 1950 the club's home moved from Antônio Carlos to the newer and larger Estádio Independência and Atlético had another Campeonato Mineiro triumph. It was also the year of the European tour, an important event in the club's history. The team played a series of friendly football matches in Europe, becoming the first club of Minas Gerais and also the first Brazilian at professional level to compete in the continent. Atlético Mineiro played ten matches from 1 November to 7 December, touring through Germany (where it took part in a Winter Tournament), Austria, Belgium, Luxembourg and France. The team won six matches, lost two and tied the remaining, scoring 24 goals and conceding 18. At a time when neither national competitions in Brazil nor continental in South America exist, and in the wake of the traumatic Maracanazo, the tour and Atlético's results, many of which achieved under adverse weather conditions and snow, were seen by national sports media as a historic achievement for Brazilian football itself.

Upon the return of the club's delegation from the tour, the team was honored by the Brazilian Sports Confederation and received a standing ovation at the Maracanã before a Campeonato Carioca match. The team was welcomed by over 50,000 people upon its return to Belo Horizonte, in what was described as an "apotheotic" celebration in the city streets. Despite not having an unbeaten run, sports media lauded Atlético Mineiro's tour as a historical success for the country's football, which had suffered a major setback with the Maracanazo in the same year, and the results achieved under adverse conditions and snowy grounds led to the dubbing of the team as Campeões do Gelo (Portuguese for "Ice Champions"), a feat remembered in the club's official anthem.

The club's success in the state competition continued in the 1950s with five consecutive Campeonato Mineiro victories from 1952 to 1956, and another in 1958. In 1959, Atlético took part in the first edition of the Taça Brasil, an annual nationwide cup competition contested between state league champions, created by the CBD to select Brazil's entrants in the newly formed Copa Libertadores. Between the decades of 1940 and 1960, players of national relevance who played for Atlético included as Bigode (part of the Brazilian squad in the 1950 FIFA World Cup), Carlyle (the first Atlético player to play for the Brazilian national team in 1949), Nívio Gabrich, Murilo Silva, Lucas Miranda, Orlando Pingo de Ouro, Paulo Valentim, Mussula, Marcial de Mello and Djalma Dias.

In the 1960s, Atlético won the Campeonato Mineiro twice, in 1962 and 1963, but failed to advance to the later stages of the Taça Brasil. Mineirão, Belo Horizonte's new stadium, opened in 1965 and immediately became the club's home. It was in the mid-1960s that the rivalry with Cruzeiro became the biggest in the state, after this club won the first five state leagues of the Mineirão era. In 1967, another national-level competition was created by the CBD, the Torneio Roberto Gomes Pedrosa. It included more clubs than the Taça Brasil, but Atlético did not finish in the top-four in any of its editions in the decade. In the second half of the 1960s, highlights came in the form of friendlies against national sides. In 1968, Atlético, representing the Brazilian national team, defeated European Championship runners-up Yugoslavia 3–2 at the Mineirão. The following year, the Seleção itself, which would become champions of the 1970 FIFA World Cup, was defeated by Atlético 2–1.

== National success and dominance in Minas Gerais (1970–1989) ==
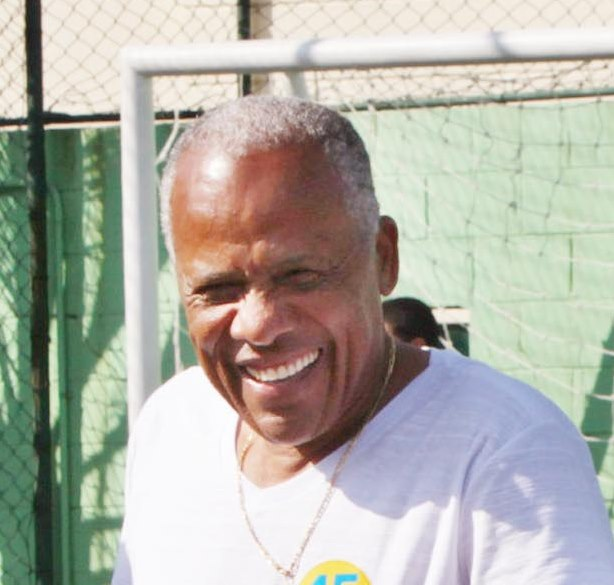
Dadá Maravilha, here pictured in 2013, was the top goalscorer and led to club to triumph in the 1971 Brasileirão.

With the arrival of Telê Santana as the club's manager in 1970, Atlético broke Cruzeiro's sequence and won its first state league title in the Mineirão, also finishing third in the last Roberto Gomes Pedrosa. In 1971, led by midfielder Oldair and World Cup-winning forward Dadá Maravilha, the club won the Campeonato Brasileiro. It was the first edition of the competition, also known as the Brasileirão, which replaced both the Taça Brasil and the Roberto Gomes Pedrosa as the new national championship. Atlético played a final group stage against São Paulo and Botafogo, defeating the former 1–0 at the Mineirão and the latter 1–0 at the Maracanã. The victory also secured the club's first participation in an official continental competition, the 1972 Copa Libertadores, in which it failed to reach the second round.

After four trophyless years, Atlético won the state league again in 1976 and finished third in that year's Campeonato Brasileiro. Starting from 1977, Atlético's youth program formed a golden generation of players, regarded as one of the greatest in the club's history, that would last until the middle of the 1980s. Reinaldo, Toninho Cerezo, Éder, Luisinho, Paulo Isidoro and João Leite were central to the team that took Atlético to six consecutive state league victories between 1978 and 1983, and to good results in the Série A. Atlético came second in the 1977 Brasileirão, losing to São Paulo on penalties at the Mineirão, despite remaining undefeated for the entire season. Reinaldo, the league's top scorer in that season with an average of 1.56 goals per match, was banned from the final. By his account, this was because of his insistence on celebrating his goals by raising his fist, a political symbol which opposed the Brazilian military government of the time. In 1978, Atlético reached the Copa Libertadores semi-finals and won the Copa dos Campeões Brasileiros, a tournament organised by the CBD between past winners of the Brasileirão. Atlético defeated São Paulo in a penalty shootout in the final. In 1980, Atlético lost in another controversial Brasileirão final. Three players were sent off against Flamengo, among them Reinaldo, who received a straight red card after scoring twice. The following year, Atlético was eliminated from Copa Libertadores without losing a match, after having five players sent off in a play-off match.

In the match, played at Serra Dourada Stadium, Atlético forward and best player Reinaldo received a straight red card from referee José Roberto Wright after fouling Flamengo's Zico at 33 minutes, in what was described as a "normal" foul and "without much violence". After the foul, Wright then sent off Atlético player Éder for complaining, after which the game was stopped. A turmoil started, in which Atlético's Palhinha and Chicão were also sent off, for insulting the referee. Left with seven players, Atlético's goalkeeper João Leite simulated an injury at the restart of the match, but Wright refused to stop the game. Atlético defender Osmar then held the ball with his hands, preventing the restart, for which he too was sent off and the match ended at the 37 minute mark, because Atlético had less than seven players on the field. The match ended in a 0–0 draw, which meant qualification for Flamengo, as it had the best goal difference in the group stage.

Atlético tried to appeal to a CONMEBOL court for annulment of the match, unsuccessfully. According to Wright, who until before the match was considered the country's best referee, Reinaldo's foul was indeed "normal" but he was sent off because of a previous warning. He also stated that Éder, Palhinha and Chicão were "stickers to indiscipline", and that he had to send Éder off as to not lose control of the match. The episode and referee Wright's performance were described by Brazilian and South American media as "shameful", "deplorable" and "opprobrium". Flamengo advanced to the semi-finals and went on to win the competition.

During the 1980s, Atlético participated in and won international friendly competitions, such as the Amsterdam Tournament and the Tournoi de Paris. The club had the best statistic league records of the 1980, 1983, 1985, 1986 and 1987 Brasileirão seasons, but did not win the title, falling in the finals or semi-finals of those editions. In the second half of the decade, the club continued its success in the state, winning the Campeonato Mineiro in 1985, 1986, 1988 and 1989. Atlético was one of Brazil's top sides of the 1980s, providing many players to the Brazilian national team, being dominant at state level and having good performances in the Brasileirão, but failed to win the competition due to a tendency to lose in its final knockout stages.

== International achievements and financial turmoil (1990–2009) ==
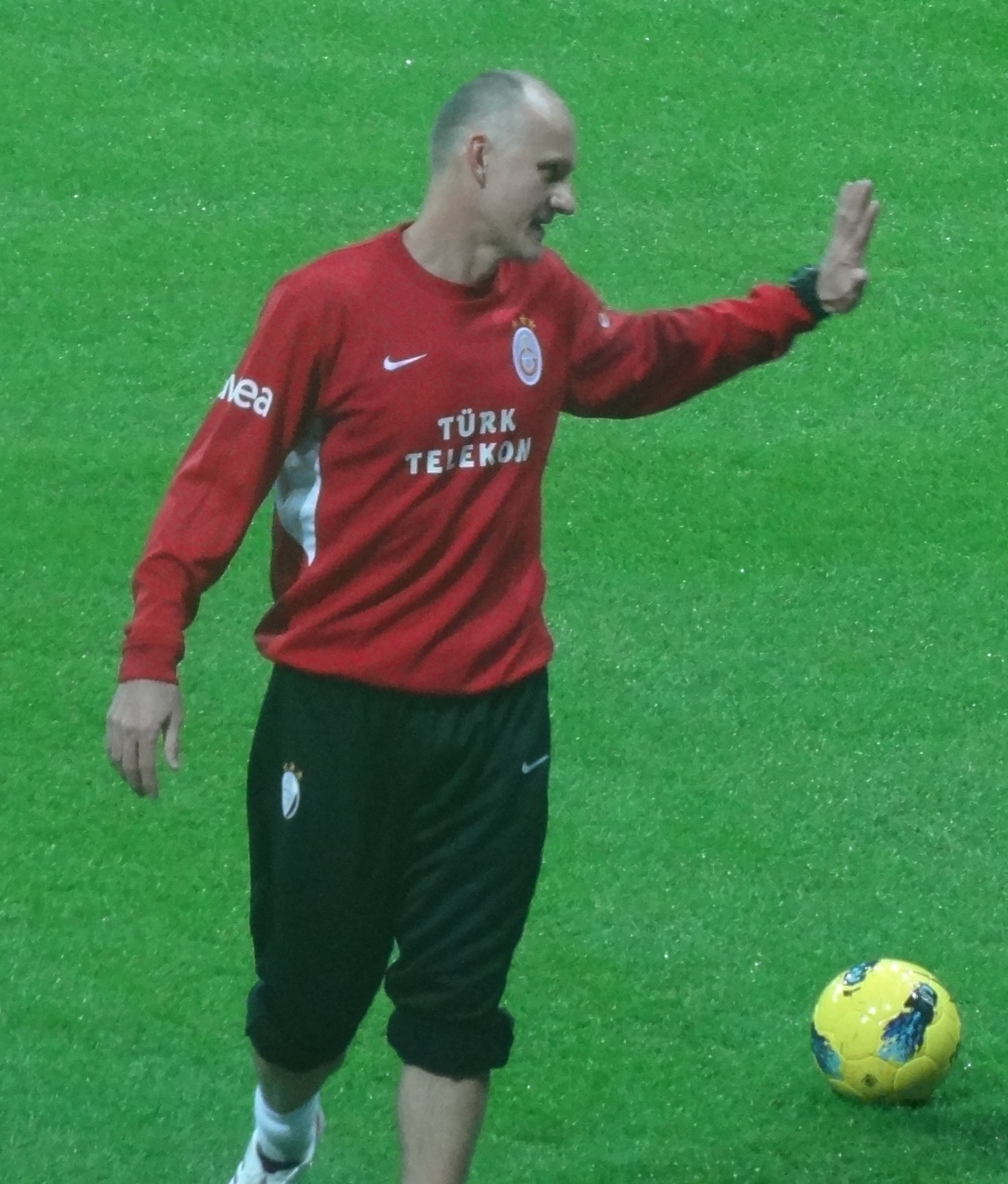
Cláudio Taffarel won the 1997 Copa CONMEBOL with Atlético

In the following decade, Atlético won the state league in 1991 and saw success at international level in 1992, when it won the inaugural Copa CONMEBOL, its first official international title, defeating Olimpia in the finals. As champion of that competition, the club took part in the 1993 Copa de Oro, in which it eliminated rivals Cruzeiro in the semi-finals but eventually lost to Boca Juniors. After finishing fourth in the 1994 Brasileirão, the following year saw the club win the state league and reach the finals of the Copa CONMEBOL for a second time, this one ending in defeat to Rosario Central. In 1996, Atlético participated in the Copa Masters CONMEBOL, a competition between past winners of the Copa CONMEBOL that was played in Cuiabá; Atlético eliminated Rosario Central in the semi-finals but lost to São Paulo in the final match. The team also finished third in that year's Brasileiro and fourth in the following edition, falling in the semi-finals of both seasons.

Another triumph came in the 1997 Copa CONMEBOL, when an Atlético team that included Marques and Cláudio Taffarel reached the finals of the competition. Atlético faced an Argentine team in a continental final for the third time, with reigning champion of the competition Lanús as the opponent. Atlético took the lead in the series with a 4–1 win at La Fortaleza. After the match, Atlético players and staff were trapped in the surrounding wiring and attacked by Lanús players and fans. Atlético head coach Emerson Leão had to undergo surgery after being hit in the face. The second leg was played at the Mineirão, and this time the team's advantage was secured with a 1–1 draw, and Atlético won its second international title undefeated. Atlético player Valdir was the top scorer of the competition with seven goals.

In 1999, after another Campeonato Mineiro title, an Atlético side led by Marques and Guilherme, the top scorer in the league, reached the Série A finals for the fourth time, but lost to Corinthians. Despite international success and good performances in the Série A, the decade was marked by bad club management by Atlético's presidents and deteriorating finances, which made the club one of the most indebted in Brazilian football.

Atlético won the Campeonato Mineiro in 2000, reached the Copa Libertadores quarter-finals and the semi-finals of Copa Mercosur, but had a bad season in the national league, the Copa João Havelange. The following season, despite a good performance in the Brasileirão with a squad that included Marques, Guilherme and Gilberto Silva, the team once again was eliminated in the Série A semi-finals, eventually finishing in fourth place. Atlético then finished in the upper part of the national league table in the following two seasons, but in 2004 it barely escaped relegation. In 2005 the club was demoted to the Série B, the second level of the Brasileirão.

The club was promoted straight back up as Série B champion in 2006, returning to the Série A for the 2007 season. That year, Atlético won the Campeonato Mineiro, its first trophy in seven years, and finished eighth in the national league. Alexandre Kalil was chosen as the club's new president in 2008, and tried to improve its finances and status. In 2009, with Diego Tardelli in good form, Atlético led the Brasileirão for eight of the thirty-eight rounds, before eventually finishing in seventh place. Despite some highlights at the beginning and end of the decade, the 2000s were not a successful period in the club's history, marked once again by bad administration and frequent managerial changes.

== National resurgence and international success (2010–present) ==
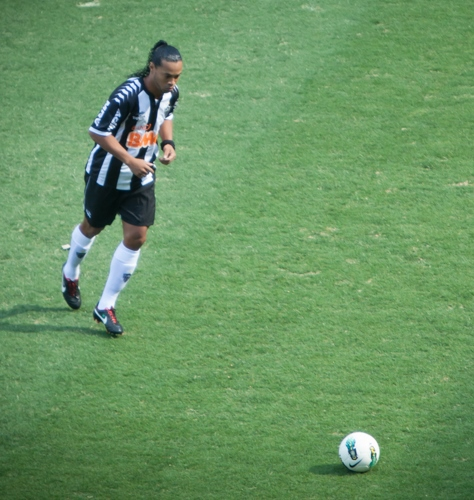
Ronaldinho played an important part in the club's resurgence after his arrival in 2012

The team won its 40th Campeonato Mineiro in 2010, but finished 13th in the Série A. After an unsuccessful year in 2011, coming close to relegation, the arrival of Cuca as manager at the end of that season marked the beginning of another successful era for the club. In 2012 the club moved back to the Independência as the Mineirão was closed for renovation, and won the Campeonato Mineiro undefeated. The arrival of Ronaldinho in the middle of the season was an important event for the club, which eventually finished as runner-up in the Série A and earned a spot in the following year's Copa Libertadores.

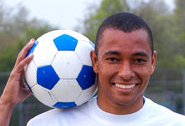
Gilberto Silva had his breakthrough with Atlético in 2001 and returned to the club to win the 2013 Copa Libertadores

2013 saw the return of Tardelli to the club, who joined Ronaldinho, Jô and Bernard, and Atlético once again had a strong start with yet another Campeonato Mineiro win and qualification for the knockout stages of Libertadores as the best team of the second stage. An iconic moment for the club happened at the Independência, which had been adopted since 2012 as the club's home ground after renovations, in the second leg of the continental competition's quarter-finals against Tijuana. After drawing 2–2 away and with the score 1–1 at home, Leonardo Silva fouled a Tijuana player inside the box at the 87th minute, and a penalty was awarded, subsequently saved by Victor with his foot. The save represented to many the kicking out of the club's historic bad luck.

In the semi-finals Atlético faced Argentine champion Newell's Old Boys, and lost the first leg 2–0 in Rosario. In the second leg, Atlético scored in the first-half, and after the match was interrupted because of a failure in the floodlights, made 2–0 at 90+6, the final score. Atlético advanced after winning 3–2 on penalties. In the finals Atlético re-encountered Olimpia, after the first continental final the club took part in. As in the semi-finals, Atlético lost the first leg 2–0 at the Defensores del Chaco, and the second leg was played at the Mineirão due to the competition's rules, which demanded a higher capacity stadium. A Jô goal in the beginning of the second half and a header by Leonardo Silva at the 87th minute equalised the aggregate, and the match ended with the same score after extra-time. The title was decided by a penalty shootout, which Atlético Mineiro won 4–3 to claim its first Copa Libertadores title. Jô was the top goalscorer in the competition with seven goals, and Victor was selected as the tournament's best goalkeeper. The club's first participation in the FIFA Club World Cup, however, was unsuccessful, as the team failed to reach the finals after losing to Raja Casablanca; Atlético eventually finished in third place after defeating Guangzhou Evergrande.

The following year, Atlético won its first Recopa Sudamericana after once again meeting Lanús at a continental final, which finished 4–3 after extra-time. In the first leg in Lanús, Galo had won 1–0. At the Mineirão, Diego Tardelli scored his hundredth goal for the club at the 6th minute, and Maicosuel scored at the 37th minute. For the granate, the previous year's Copa Sudamericana champions, Ayala, Silva and Acosta scored, the latter at the 90+3 mark. which took the match to extra time. Lanús's players Gustavo Gómez at the 102nd minute and Victor Ayala at the 111th minute gave the title away with own goals.

In that season's Copa do Brasil quarter-finals against Corinthians and semi-finals against Flamengo, Atlético lost the first leg 2–0 and conceded first in the second one. The team managed to make 4–1 comebacks in both stages to advance. Atlético won its first Copa do Brasil defeating rivals Cruzeiro twice in highly anticipated finals, the first at national level to feature both Belo Horizonte clubs. In the end of 2014 Alexandre Kalil's term at the club's presidency ended and Daniel Nepomuceno was elected for the office. The team's successful run in the decade continued with its 43rd state league triumph in 2015, and Nepomuceno announced that Atlético had a four-year project to build a new stadium in Belo Horizonte, with a 45,000 capacity.

== See also ==
- List of Clube Atlético Mineiro seasons
