= Armando Giorni =

Brazilian footballer (1922–2007)

Mão de Onça
Personal information
- Full name: Armando Giorni
- Date of birth: 15 November 1922
- Place of birth: Dores do Indaiá, Brazil
- Date of death: 13 August 2007 (aged 84)
- Place of death: Belo Horizonte, Brazil
- Position: Goalkeeper

Senior career*
Years	Team	Apps	(Gls)
1944–1946	Sete de Setembro-MG		
1946–1952	Atlético Mineiro	95	(0)
1949	→ Bangu (loan)		
- * Club domestic league appearances and goals as of 29 February 2024

Armando Giorni (15 November 1922 – 13 August 2007), better known by the nickname Mão de Onça, was a Brazilian professional footballer who played as a goalkeeper.

== Career ==
Armando Giorni earned the nickname Mão de Onça because he worked as a tinsmith before joining professional football. He played for Sete de Setembro and Atlético Mineiro, where he made 95 appearances and won the state championship four times. He was part of the trip to Europe that became known as "Campeão do Gelo".

== Honours ==
Atlético Mineiro

- Campeonato Mineiro: 1946, 1947, 1949, 1950
