= Zé do Monte =

Brazilian footballer (1927–1990)

Personal information
- Full name: José do Monte Furtado Sobrinho
- Date of birth: 3 August 1927
- Place of birth: Abaeté, Brazil
- Date of death: 27 June 1990 (aged 62)
- Place of death: São Paulo, Brazil
- Position: Midfielder

Youth career
- 1942–1945: Usina Esperança

Senior career*
Years	Team	Apps	(Gls)
1946–1956	Atlético Mineiro	320	(25)
- * Club domestic league appearances and goals as of 20 March 2024

José do Monte Furtado Sobrinho (3 August 1927 – 27 June 1990), better known as Zé do Monte, was a Brazilian professional footballer who played as a midfielder.

== Career ==
Accurate in the long passes, the midfielder Zé do Monte was one of the most important players of Atlético Mineiro in 1940s and 1950s. He helped popularize the club mascot (rooster), as he always entered the field with a bump under the arm. Zé do Monte played for the team from 1946 to 1956, in 320 games, scored 25 goals and won eight Minas Gerais state titles.

He was part of the trip to Europe that became known as "Campeão do Gelo".

== Honours ==
Atlético Mineiro

- Campeonato Mineiro: 1946, 1947, 1949, 1950, 1953, 1953, 1954, 1955

== See also ==
- List of one-club men in association football
