= 1950 Atlético Mineiro European tour =

Association football tour

- Atlético Mineiro's delegation was welcomed by a large crowd in Belo Horizonte upon its return from the tour

In West Germany
- Game one: 1860 Munich 3–4 Atlético Mineiro
- Game two: Hamburg 0–4 Atlético Mineiro
- Game three: Werder Bremen 3–1 Atlético Mineiro
- Game four: Schalke 04 1–3 Atlético Mineiro
- Game five: Eintracht Braunschweig 3–3 Atlético Mineiro

In Austria
- Game six: Rapid Wien 3–0 Atlético Mineiro

In Belgium
- Game seven: Anderlecht 1–2 Atlético Mineiro

In Luxembourg
- Game eight: Union Luxembourg 3–3 Atlético Mineiro

In France (including Sarre)
- Game nine: 1.FC Saarbrücken 0–2 Atlético Mineiro
- Game ten: Stade Français 1–2 Atlético Mineiro

The 1950 Atlético Mineiro European tour was an episode in the history of Clube Atlético Mineiro, an association football club based in Belo Horizonte, Brazil, in which it played a series of friendly football matches against clubs in Europe, becoming the first club from Minas Gerais and also the first Brazilian professional club to compete in that continent.

Atlético Mineiro played ten matches on European soil from 1 November to 7 December 1950, touring through West Germany (where it took part in a Winter Tournament), Austria, Belgium, Luxembourg and France (including the Saar Protectorate). The Brazilian team won six matches, lost two and tied the remaining, scoring 24 goals and conceding 18.

Having occurred at a time when neither national competitions in Brazil nor continental in South America exist, and in the wake of the traumatic Maracanazo, the tour and Atlético's results, many of which achieved under adverse weather conditions and snow, were seen by national sports media at the time as a historic achievement for Brazilian football.

== Background ==
In 1950, a commission formed by the German Football Association traveled to Brazil to choose a football club to a series of friendly matches in Germany against some of the country's club sides. The recency of both the Maracanazo, a traumatic event for Brazilian football, and World War II, in which Germany and Brazil were at opposite sides, may have made clubs from Rio de Janeiro and São Paulo, then the footballing centres of the country, refuse participation in the friendly tour. Eventually Atlético Mineiro, then state league champion of Minas Gerais, was selected. Canor Simões, a journalist and sports director of the time, was credited as influential in the choice.

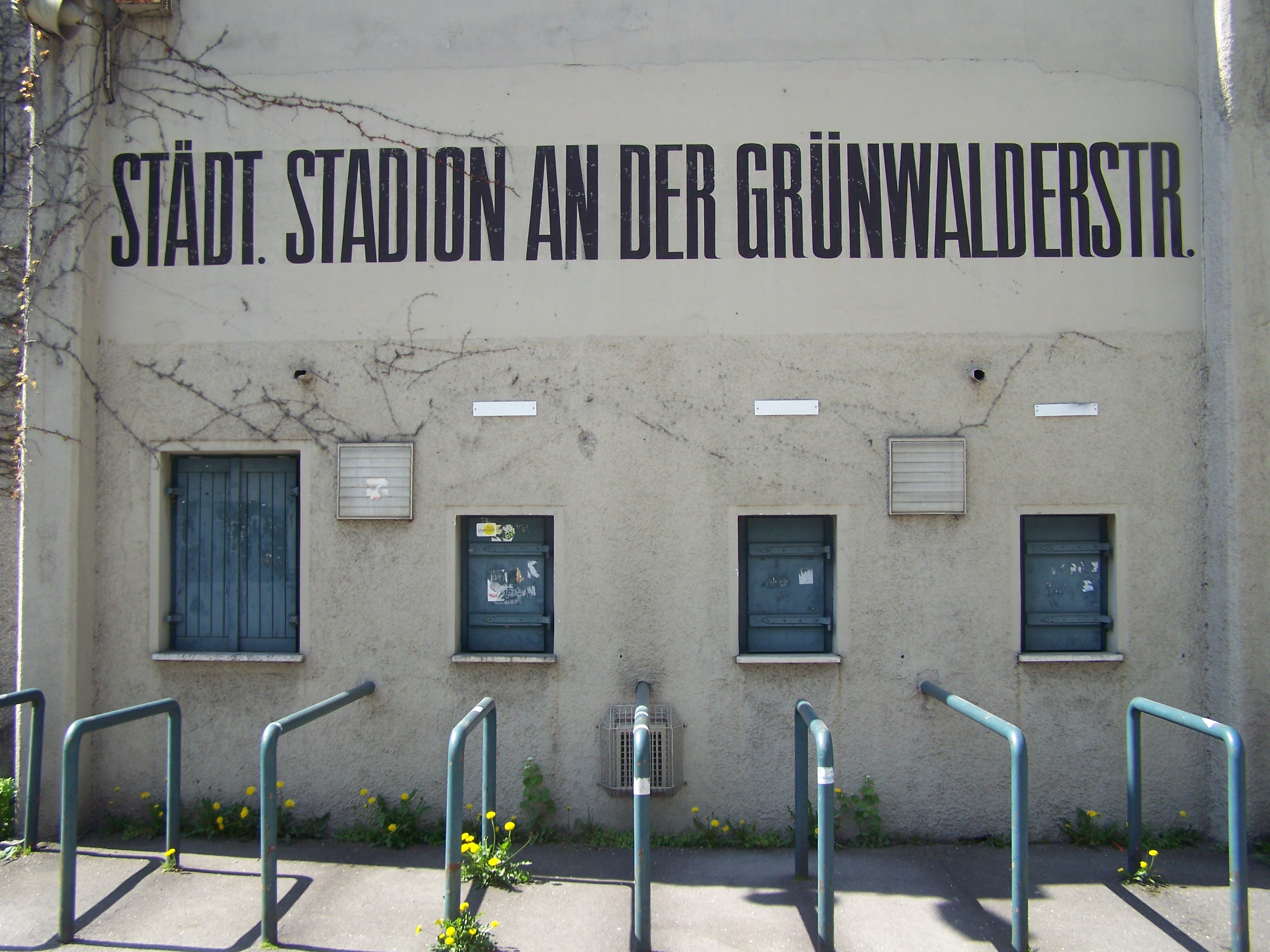
Grünwalder Stadion (pictured) was the first ground where Atlético Mineiro played on European soil

== Tour ==
Atlético Mineiro's delegation arrived in Frankfurt on 27 October, where it was welcomed by German sports media, as it was the first time a Brazilian club played in the country. From there, the team traveled to Munich, where it played its first match against 1860 München, from Oberliga Süd, on 1 November. The match was played at the Grünwalder Stadion, with 35,000 spectators, under a misty and cool weather, and Atlético won 4–3. Hamburg was the team's second stop, where it defeated Oberliga Nord winner Hamburger SV 4–0 in front of 20,000 people at the Rothenbaum, on 4 November. Only 24 hours later, Atlético Mineiro travelled to Bremen, and suffered the tour's first defeat: 1–3 to Werder (that also played in the Oberliga Nord) at the Weserstadion, with an attendance of 26,000. A one-week rest followed, after which the team traveled to Gelsenkirchen. Schalke 04, which went on to win that season's Oberliga West, was defeated 3–1. The encounter was a farewell match for Schalke legends Ernst Kuzorra and Fritz Szepan, and was attended by 30,000 at the Glückauf-Kampfbahn on 12 November.

From Germany, Atlético followed to Vienna, where 60,000 people saw the Brazilians lose 0–3 to a strong Rapid Wien side, which would form the backbone of the Austria national football team in the 1954 FIFA World Cup, the tour's worst result. Viennese press reported that Atlético Mineiro's players complained about refereeing (a supposed offside goal and a non-existent penalty to Rapid), as well as about the crowd's behaviour, which they saw as menacing (even though the home team's supporters were only raising their arms to applaud the visitors). On 20 November, the team played 1.FC Saarbrücken, then out of the German Football Association and playing in the French football league system because of Saarlands's French protectorate status; Atlético won the match by 2–0.

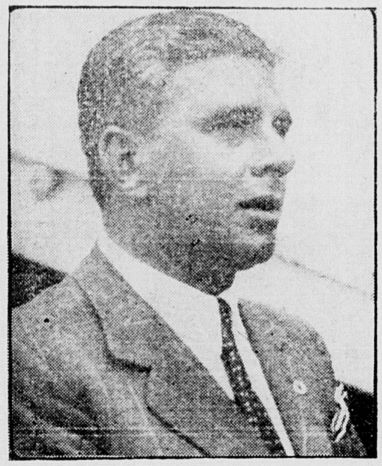
Uruguayan Ricardo Diéz (pictured) coached the team during the tour

A trip to Belgium followed, where 40,000 watched the team beat Belgian First Division champions Anderlecht, led by forward Joseph Mermans, by a 2–1 score, on 22 November. On 26 November the club returned to Germany, where it tied with Oberliga Nord's Eintracht Braunschweig 3–3 at Eintracht-Stadion in front of 30,000 people. Another 3–3 tie followed, this time in Luxembourg against Union, increased by players from some other Luxembourger sides, on 5 December. The tour ended in Paris with a match against Stade Français on 7 December at Parc des Princes with a 4,000 attendance. Atlético won 2–1 under an extremely low temperature, which forced goalkeeper Kafunga to put his hands in a hot water bottle during the match, and caused midfielder Barbatana to suffer from hypothermia.

The tour ended in turmoil at European soil, however, as a disagreement between the club's board members and the German tour manager Eden Kaltenecker resulted in the disappearance of the latter and a shortage of money for the return trip to Brazil, which had to be ultimately funded by Minas Gerais State Government. A planned match against French champion Lille, to be played on 10 December, was also cancelled because of intense cold.

== Aftermath ==
Brazilian press anticipated the return of the club's delegation, which was honored by the Brazilian Sports Confederation and received a standing ovation at the Maracanã before a Campeonato Carioca match. The team was welcomed by over 50,000 people upon its return to Belo Horizonte, in what was described as an "apotheotic" celebration in the city streets. Despite not having an unbeaten run, sports media lauded Atlético Mineiro's tour as a historical success for the country's football, which had suffered a major setback with the Maracanazo in the same year. The results achieved under adverse conditions and snowy grounds led to the dubbing of the team as Campeões do Gelo (Portuguese for "Ice Champions"), a feat remembered in the club's official anthem.

== Matches ==
1 November 1950	1860 München (West Germany)	3–4	(Brazil) Atlético Mineiro	Grünwalder Stadion, Munich
	Thanner 13'; Sommer 71', 80'	Report	Lucas Miranda 7', 35'; Lauro 27'; Vaguinho 68'	Attendance: 35,000; Referee: Hechert (Germany)

4 November 1950	Hamburger SV (West Germany)	0–4	(Brazil) Atlético Mineiro	Rothenbaum, Hamburg
		Report	Nívio 13'; Alvinho 20'; Lucas Miranda 27', 74'	Attendance: 20,000; Referee: Rexhauser (Germany)

5 November 1950	Werder Bremen (West Germany)	3–1	(Brazil) Atlético Mineiro	Weserstadion, Bremen
	Preuße 35'; Burdenski 69'; Pöschl 81'	Report	Lucas Miranda 55'	Attendance: 26,000; Referee: Fritz de Zelle (Germany)

12 November 1950	Schalke 04 (West Germany)	1–3	(Brazil) Atlético Mineiro	Glückauf-Kampfbahn, Gelsenkirchen
	Malinowski 77'	Report	Lucas Miranda 4'; Vaguinho 17', 61'	Attendance: 30,000; Referee: Guzzetti (Italy)

16 November 1950	Rapid Wien (Austria)	3–0	(Brazil) Atlético Mineiro	Pfarrwiese, Vienna
	Dienst 14'; Körner 35'; Probst 69'	Report		Attendance: 60,000; Referee: Alois Beranek (Austria)

20 November 1950	Saarbrücken (Saar Protectorate)	0–2	(Brazil) Atlético Mineiro	Kieselhumes, Saarbrücken
		Report	Nívio 82', 87'	Attendance: 16,000

22 November 1950	Anderlecht (Belgium)	1–2	(Brazil) Atlético Mineiro	Émile Versé, Anderlecht, Brussels
	Mermans 38'	Report	Vaguinho 29'; Alvinho 83'	Attendance: 40,000; Referee: Albert Alsteen (Belgium)

26 November 1950	Eintracht Braunschweig (West Germany)	3–3	(Brazil) Atlético Mineiro	Eintracht-Stadion, Braunschweig
	Schroder 37'; Thamm 67', 89'	Report	Vaguinho 18'; Alvinho 53'; Murilinho 79'	Attendance: 35,000

5 December 1950	Union Luxembourg	3–3	(Brazil) Atlético Mineiro	Achille Hammerel, Luxembourg
	Juca (o.g.); Müller; Hermann	Report	Vaguinho; Lauro; Nívio	Attendance: 1,800

7 December 1950	Stade Français (France)	1–2	(Brazil) Atlético Mineiro	Parc des Princes, Paris
	Drouet 72'	Report	Nívio 24'; Lucas Miranda 43'	Attendance: 4,000; Referee: Gaby Tordjman (France)

== Club delegation ==
=== Players ===
Position	Name
Goalkeeper	(Brazil) Kafunga
Goalkeeper	(Brazil) Mão-de-Onça
Defender	(Brazil) Afonso
Defender	(Brazil) Oswaldo
Defender	(Brazil) Juca
Defender	(Brazil) Márcio
Midfielder	(Brazil) Moreno
Midfielder	(Brazil) Vicente
Midfielder	(Brazil) Zé do Monte
Midfielder	(Brazil) Haroldo
Midfielder	(Brazil) Barbatana
Midfielder	(Brazil) Vicente Pérez
Forward	(Brazil) Lucas Miranda
Forward	(Brazil) Lauro
Forward	(Brazil) Zezinho
Forward	(Brazil) Alvinho
Forward	(Brazil) Nívio Gabrich
Forward	(Brazil) Vavá
Forward	(Brazil) Murilinho
Forward	(Brazil) Vaguinho

=== Staff ===
Position	Name
Delegation chief	(Brazil) Domingos Dângelo
Head coach	(Uruguay) Ricardo Diéz
Doctor	(Brazil) Abdo Arges
Interpreter	(Germany) Teodora Breickport
Journalist	(Brazil) Francisco Américo

== See also ==
- History of Clube Atlético Mineiro
