= Barbatana =

Brazilian footballer and manager (1929-2011)

Personal information
- Full name: João Lacerda Filho
- Date of birth: 11 February 1929
- Place of birth: Ponte Nova, Brazil
- Date of death: 29 June 2011 (aged 82)
- Place of death: Belo Horizonte, Brazil
- Position: Midfielder

Youth career
- Metalusina

Senior career*
Years	Team	Apps	(Gls)
1948–1949	Metalusina		
1950	Atlético Mineiro		
1951–1952	Bangu		
1953–1954	Villa Nova		
1955–1957	América Mineiro		
1958–1959	Atlético Mineiro		

Managerial career
- 1966: Atlético Mineiro (Caretaker)
- 1970–1972: Atlético Mineiro (Caretaker)
- 1975: Goiás
- 1975: CEUB
- 1981: Sport Recife
- 1979: Cruzeiro
- 1982: Atlético Mineiro
- 1983–1984: Indonesia under-23
- 1987: Náutico
- 1992: Atlético Mineiro
- * Club domestic league appearances and goals

João Lacerda Filho (11 February 1929 – 29 June 2011), commonly known as Barbatana, was a Brazilian professional football coach and player. During his playing days, he was a midfielder, and played for clubs in Minas Gerais and Rio de Janeiro. As a coach, he worked mainly with Atlético Mineiro, but also coached many other clubs in Brazil and the Indonesia national under-23 team.

== Career ==
=== Player ===
Barbatana first played in a club in his hometown Ponte Nova as a condition to work in the city's sugar refinery. The team was called Sport Club Ana Florentina, but soon he was seen by and went to play for Metalusina, a club from Barão de Cocais. After a friendly between Metalusina and Atlético Mineiro played in the city, Barbatana moved to the latter in 1950, taking part in that year's Campeonato Mineiro and the 1950 Atlético Mineiro European tour. He was not under contract, and was sent back to Metalusina with the promise of being signed. However, Bangu also noticed Barbatana and signed him. He spent two seasons with Bangu, before returning to Minas Gerais to play for Villa Nova in 1953, where he was coached by Yustrich. The manager moved to Porto in 1955 and wanted to take the player with him, but Barbatana chose to sign with América Mineiro. He spent two seasons at América, before returning to rivals Atlético Mineiro, where he ended his career.

=== Manager ===
After retiring from playing, Barbatana spent nine years away from football, until he was called up by an Atlético Mineiro director, who invited him to coach the club's youth squads. Barbatana agreed, initially to a three-month experience period, but remained in the position for years, discovering players like Lola, Humberto Ramos, Marcelo Oliveira, Toninho Cerezo, Paulo Isidoro and Reinaldo, who would become an Atlético Mineiro legend. Barbatana then had stints as Atlético's caretaker manager in the 1960s and early 1970s, and in 1975, he coached Goiás and CEUB.

He became manager of Atlético Mineiro's first squad in 1976, where he was reunited with former youth squads graduates Oliveira, Cerezo, Isidoro and Reinaldo, leading the team to an undefeated runner-up season in the 1977 Campeonato Brasileiro Série A. He left the club in 1978, and spent a period managing Atlético's rivals Cruzeiro in 1979. Barbatana then manager Sport Recife in 1981, and returned to Atlético in 1982. He also managed the Indonesia national under-23 team, Náutico, Al-Hilal FC, Nacional (AM) and América Mineiro during his career, which ended in 1992 once again with Atlético Mineiro. He is the fourth manager with most matches for Atlético, with 227.

== Death ==
Barbatana died of Alzheimer's disease on 29 June 2011, aged 82.

== Honours ==
=== Player ===
Atlético Mineiro

- Campeonato Mineiro: 1958

=== Manager ===
Atlético Mineiro

- Campeonato Mineiro: 1976
- Campeonato Brasileiro Série A: 1977 (runner-up)
- Copa dos Campeões Brasileiros: 1978
