= Ricardo Diéz =

Uruguayan football coach (1900–1971)

Ricardo Díez
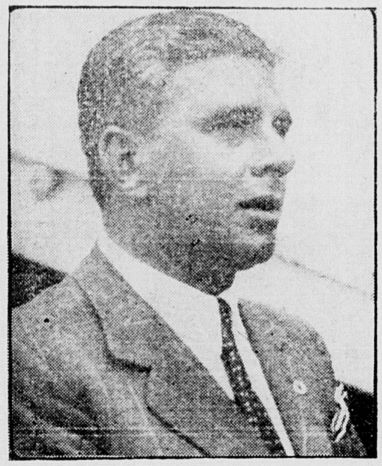
- Diéz in 1940

Personal information
- Full name: Ricardo Díez Santa Cruz
- Date of birth: 11 February 1900
- Place of birth: Rivera, Uruguay
- Date of death: 27 April 1971 (aged 71)
- Place of death: Belo Horizonte, Brazil

Managerial career
- Years: Team
- 1936–1938: Grêmio Santanense
- 1939: América Mineiro
- 1940: America
- 1941: Sport
- 1941–1942: Internacional
- 1944: Santos
- 1946: América Mineiro
- 1947: Siderúrgica
- 1949: América Mineiro
- 1950–1951: Atlético Mineiro
- 1953: Cruzeiro
- 1954: Bahia
- 1954–1956: Atlético Mineiro
- 1957: Náutico
- 1958–1959: Atlético Mineiro
- 1959: Santa Cruz
- 1960: Atlético Mineiro
- 1962–1963: Valério
- 1964: Unión Magdalena
- 1965: Democrata FC

Ricardo Diéz, born as Emetério Seledônio Díez (11 February 1900 – 27 April 1971), was a Uruguayan football coach who mainly worked in Brazil.

== Career ==
In 1937 Diéz won with provincial Grêmio Foot-Ball Santanense from Santana do Livramento the Campeonato Gaúcho, the only major title in the club's history. In 1942 he also led Internacional, where he was the first foreign coach, to the state title. He is credited at the club for the discovery of the later national team player Nena. In 1941 he was Campeonato Pernambucano runner-up with Sport Recife, where he has been often attributed with the discovery of World Cup 1950 star striker Ademir de Menezes.

Diez, who smoked filterless cigarettes of the Continental brand, is best known for his times with Atlético Mineiro, which he coached on various stints between 1950 and 1960, winning the Campeonato Mineiro in 1949 and 1954. In 1950 he guided Atlético on its successful trip to Central Europe during the northern winter, which became part of the club's folklore and led to its nickname Campeões do Gelo, the "Ice Champions". In total he guided the club in 168 matches, a statistic only outdone by three other coaches, amongst them Telê Santana.

Back to Pernambuco, he became third in the State Championship of 1957 with Náutico, and in 1960 he led Santa Cruz FC to the second place behind Náutico.

Beyond this Diéz also coached other clubs from Minas Gerais: América Mineiro, in 1946, Cruzeiro in 1953, Democrata FC (Sete Lagoas, in 1965, EC Siderúrgica, in 1947, Valeriodoce in 1962 and 1963, and Paraense EC, as well as Santos in São Paulo and Bahia in the state of the same name.

== Honours ==
Grêmio Santanense

- Campeonato Gaúcho: 1937

Internacional

- Campeonato Gaúcho: 1942

Atlético Mineiro

- Campeonato Mineiro: 1949, 1954
