= Vavá (footballer, born 1932) =

Brazilian footballer

Personal information
- Full name: Osvaldo Simplício
- Date of birth: 27 August 1932
- Place of birth: Belo Horizonte, Brazil
- Date of death: 8 April 2016 (aged 83)
- Place of death: Belo Horizonte, Brazil
- Position: Defender

Senior career*
Years	Team	Apps	(Gls)
1956–1967	Cruzeiro	428	(3)
- * Club domestic league appearances and goals as of 8 November 2025

Osvaldo Simplício (27 August 1932 – 8 April 2016), better known as Vavá, was a Brazilian professional footballer who played as defender.

== Career ==
Born in Belo Horizonte, Vavá spent his 12-year professional career with Cruzeiro EC, winning 7 Minas Gerais state titles and the 1966 Taça Brasil, playing 428 games and scoring 3 goals. In 2012, he was officially inducted into the club's Hall of Fame.

== Honours ==
Cruzeiro

- Campeonato Mineiro: 1956, 1959, 1960, 1961, 1965, 1966, 1967
- Taça Brasil: 1966

== Death ==
Vavá died in Belo Horizonte on 8 April 2016, at age of 83.
