= Vavá (footballer, born 1929) =

Brazilian footballer (born 1929)

Personal information
- Full name: Walter José Pereira
- Date of birth: 5 April 1929 (age 97)
- Place of birth: Sacramento, Brazil
- Position: Forward

Senior career*
| Years | Team | Apps | (Gls) |
| 1949–1954 | Atlético Mineiro | 118 | (58) |
- * Club domestic league appearances and goals as of 29 February 2024

Walter José Pereira (born 5 April 1929), better known as Vavá, is a Brazilian former professional footballer who played as a forward.

== Career ==
A versatile forward, Vavá played for Atlético Mineiro in the early 1950s, being state champion three times and top scorer in 1952 with 15 goals. In total he made 118 appearances and scored 58 goals for the club. He was part of the trip to Europe that became known as "Campeão do Gelo". Vavá ended his career prematurely in 1954 due to a serious heart problem, but later worked at the club as director and manager of some players, such as center forward Renaldo.

== Honours ==
Atlético Mineiro

- Campeonato Mineiro: 1950, 1952, 1953

Individual

- 1952 Campeonato Mineiro top scorer: 15 goals
