= Kafunga =

Brazilian footballer (1914–1991)

Personal information
- Full name: Olavo Leite de Bastos
- Date of birth: August 7, 1914
- Place of birth: Niterói, Brazil
- Date of death: November 17, 1991 (aged 77)
- Place of death: Belo Horizonte, Brazil
- Position: Goalkeeper

Senior career*
Years	Team	Apps	(Gls)
1935–1955	Atlético Mineiro		
- * Club domestic league appearances and goals

Olavo Leite de Bastos, commonly known by the nickname Kafunga (August 7, 1914 – November 17, 1991), was an association footballer who played goalkeeper, who spent his entire career defending Atlético Mineiro.

== Career ==
Born in Niterói, Kafunga began playing football with local side Fluminense Atlético Clube (Niterói). He started his professional career with Atlético Mineiro, and made his debut in a friendly defeat 2–0 by Villa Nova in 1935. Despite the defeat, his performance was not criticized, as he prevented his club from suffering more goals. In his second game for the club, his performance was praised, and Atlético Mineiro beat Flamengo 4–0. He helped his club win the Campeonato Mineiro in 1936, 1938, 1939, 1941, 1942, 1946, 1947, 1949, 1950, 1952, 1953, 1954 and in 1955. He retired in 1955, after having played 667 games for the club in two decades. After his retirement, he worked as a football commentator and as a deputy.

== Death ==
Kafunga died on November 17, 1991, in Belo Horizonte, after suffering five strokes.
