= Brazil Independence Cup squads =

The following is a list of squads for each nation competing in Brazil Independence Cup in 1972.

== Argentina ==
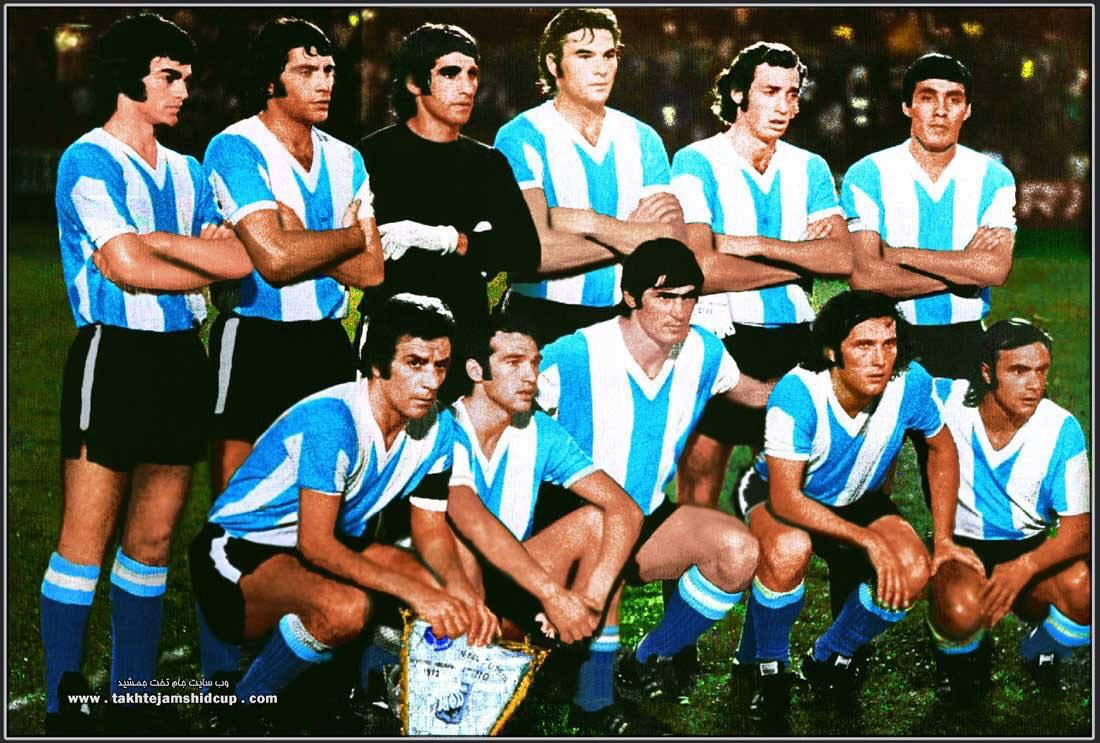
The Argentina squad before their match against Colombia.

Head coach: Juan José Pizzuti

No.	Pos.	Player	Date of birth (age)	Caps	Goals	Club
1	GK	Daniel Carnevali	4 December 1946 (aged 25)	1	0	(Argentine Football Association) Chacarita Juniors
2	DF	Miguel Ángel López	1 March 1942 (aged 30)			(Argentine Football Association) River Plate
3	DF	Enrique Wolff	21 February 1949 (aged 23)			(Argentine Football Association) Racing Club
4	DF	Osvaldo Piazza	8 April 1947 (aged 25)	2	0	(Argentine Football Association) Lanús
5	DF	Ramón Heredia	26 February 1951 (aged 21)			(Argentine Football Association) San Lorenzo
6	DF	Ángel Bargas	29 October 1946 (aged 25)	5	0	(Argentine Football Association) Chacarita Juniors
7	FW	Ernesto Mastrángelo	5 July 1948 (aged 23)			(Argentine Football Association) River Plate
8	MF	José Omar Pastoriza	23 May 1942 (aged 30)			(Argentine Football Association) Independiente
9	FW	Carlos Bianchi	26 April 1949 (aged 23)			(Argentine Football Association) Vélez Sarsfield
10	MF	Miguel Ángel Brindisi	8 October 1950 (aged 21)			(Argentine Football Association) Huracán
11	FW	Oscar Más	29 October 1946 (aged 25)			(Argentine Football Association) River Plate
20	GK	Miguel Ángel Santoro	27 February 1942 (aged 30)			(Argentine Football Association) Independiente
18	MF	Ángel Landucci	23 January 1948 (aged 24)			(Argentine Football Association) Rosario Central
14	DF	Jorge Dominichi	31 March 1947 (aged 25)	7	0	(Argentine Football Association) River Plate
15	FW	Rodolfo Fischer	2 April 1944 (aged 28)			(Argentine Football Association) San Lorenzo de Almagro
16	MF	Roberto Saverio Volpi	10 June 1950 (aged 22)			(Argentine Football Association) Newell's Old Boys
17	MF	Miguel Tojo (Note: Player would ultimately not travel with the team.)	9 July 1943 (aged 28)			(Argentine Football Association) San Lorenzo
13	MF	Alejandro Semenewicz	1 June 1949 (aged 23)	1	0	(Argentine Football Association) Independiente
19	FW	Roque Avallay	14 December 1945 (aged 26)			(Argentine Football Association) Huracán
23	MF	Miguel Ángel Raimondo	12 December 1943 (aged 28)			(Argentine Football Association) Independiente
21	DF	Rubén Oswaldo Díaz	8 January 1946 (aged 26)	6	0	(Argentine Football Association) Racing Club
22	MF	Roberto Gramajo	28 July 1943 (aged 28)			(Argentine Football Association) Rosario Central
12	GK	Rubén Omar Sánchez	29 July 1945 (aged 26)			(Argentine Football Association) Boca Juniors
24	DF	Hugo Pena	28 November 1951 (aged 20)			(Argentine Football Association) Argentinos Juniors
25	FW	Jorge Ghiso	21 June 1951 (aged 20)			(Argentine Football Association) Estudiantes La Plata
26	FW	Mario Roberto Carballo	25 March 1952 (aged 20)			(Argentine Football Association) Talleres
27	DF	Antonio Rosl	20 March 1944 (aged 28)			(Argentine Football Association) San Lorenzo
28	MF	Luis Gregorio Gallo	10 April 1945 (aged 27)			(Argentine Football Association) Vélez Sarsfield

== Africa ==
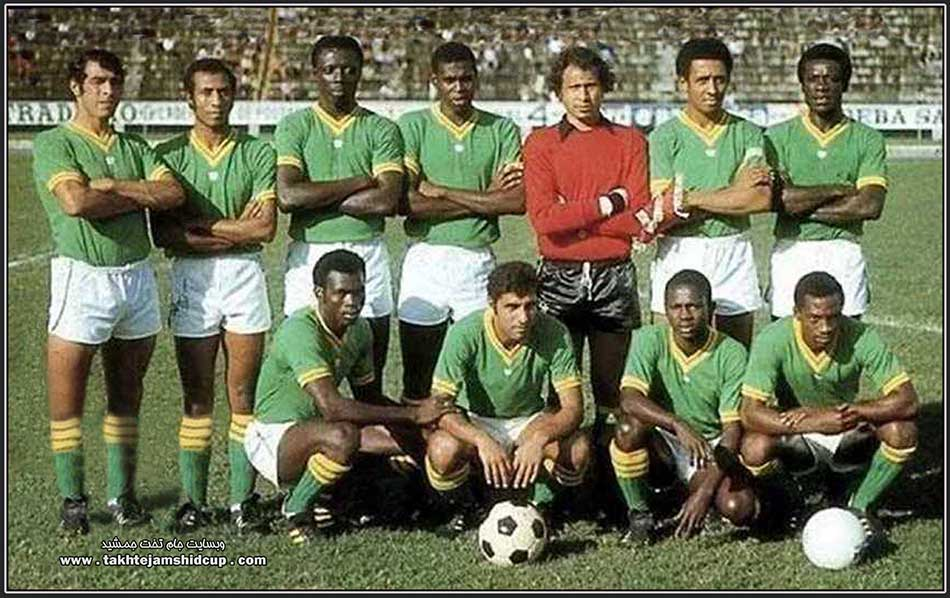
The united Africa squad for the Brazil Independence Cup.

Head coaches: (Mali) Cheikh Kouyate and (Togo) Anani Matthia

No.	Pos.	Player	Date of birth (age)	Caps	Goals	Club
1	GK	Sadok Sassi	15 November 1945 (aged 26)			(Tunisian Football Federation) Club Africain
2	DF	Sam Acquah	10 July 1943 (aged 28)			(Ghana Football Association) Hearts Of Oak
3	DF	Édouard Gnacadja	15 May 1947 (aged 25)			(French Football Federation) Lorient
4	MF	Noël Minga	12 July 1947 (aged 24)			(Congolese Football Federation) Leopards
5	MF	Maxime Camara	4 February 1943 (aged 29)			(Guinean Football Federation) Hafia
6	DF	Miloud Hadefi	15 November 1945 (aged 26)			(Algerian Football Federation) Tlemcen
7	FW	Ibrahima Sory Keita	19 March 1945 (aged 27)			(Guinean Football Federation) Hafia
9	FW	Malik Jabir	8 December 1944 (aged 27)			(Ghana Football Association) Asante Kotoko
8	MF	Haruna Ilerika	27 October 1949 (aged 22)			(Nigeria Football Federation) Stationery Stores
10	MF	Louis Gomis Diop	24 May 1949 (aged 23)			(Senegalese Football Federation) Diaraf
11	FW	Jean-Pierre Tokoto	26 January 1948 (aged 24)			(French Football Federation) Marseille
12	MF	Mohamed El Filali	9 July 1945 (aged 26)			(Royal Moroccan Football Federation) Oujda
13	GK	Tommy Sylvestre	31 August 1946 (aged 25)			(Togolese Football Federation) Étoile Filante
14	MF	Ahmed Bushara Wahba	1 January 1943 (aged 29)			(Sudan Football Association) Al-Merreikh
15	DF	Tahar Ben Ferhat	23 March 1944 (aged 28)			(Algerian Football Federation) Jeunesse Sportive Madinet Tiaret
16	FW	François M'Pelé	13 July 1947 (aged 24)			(French Football Federation) Ajaccio
17	MF	Léonard Saidi	24 November 1941 (aged 30)			(Congolese Association Football Federation) Mazembe
18	GK	Maxime Matsima	18 January 1940 (aged 32)			(Congolese Football Federation) Diables Noirs
19	DF	John Eshun	17 July 1942 (aged 29)			(Ghana Football Association) Sekondi Hasaacas
20	DF	Hassan Shehata	19 June 1949 (aged 22)			(Egyptian Football Association) Zamalek
21	FW	Ahmed Faras	7 December 1946 (aged 25)			(Royal Moroccan Football Federation) Chabab Mohammédia
22	DF	Hany Moustafa	27 October 1947 (aged 24)			(Egyptian Football Association) Al-Masry
23	FW	Laurent Pokou	10 August 1947 (aged 24)			(Ivorian Football Federation) Mimosas
24	MF	Peter Anieke	2 March 1946 (aged 26)			(Nigeria Football Federation) Chabab Mohammédia
25	FW	Roger Milla	20 May 1952 (aged 20)			(Cameroonian Football Federation) Léopard Douala
26	MF	Luciano Vassallo	15 August 1935 (aged 36)			(Ethiopian Football Federation) Cotton Factory
27	MF	Joseph Yegba Maya	8 February 1944 (aged 28)			(French Football Federation) Valenciennes-Anzin
28	MF	Ahmed Bushara Wahba	1 January 1943 (aged 29)			(Sudan Football Association) Al-Merrikh

== Bolivia ==
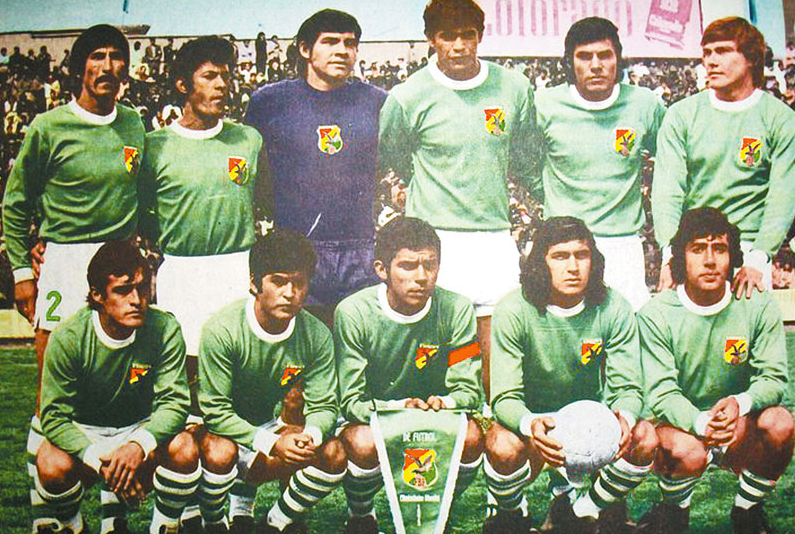
The Bolivia squad for the 1974 FIFA World Cup qualifiers.

Head coach: (Bolivia) Rubén Saldaña Barba

No.	Pos.	Player	Date of birth (age)	Caps	Goals	Club
1	GK	Carlos Conrado Jiménez	10 February 1948 (aged 24)			(Bolivian Football Federation) Chaco Petrolero
2	DF	Jorge Moreno	15 August 1938 (aged 33)			(Bolivian Football Federation) Oriente Petrolero
3	DF	Jaime Olivera	6 March 1950 (aged 22)			(Bolivian Football Federation) Jorge Wilstermann
4	MF	Armando Rivera	6 January 1941 (aged 31)			(Bolivian Football Federation) Nacional Potosí
5	MF	Nemesio Leaños	27 December 1949 (aged 22)			(Bolivian Football Federation) Oriente Petrolero
6	DF	Félix Chávez	2 January 1948 (aged 24)			(Bolivian Football Federation) Chaco Petrolero
7	MF	Jaime Rimazza	12 December 1946 (aged 25)			(Bolivian Football Federation) Deportivo Municipal
8	FW	David Vaca	6 March 1950 (aged 22)			(Bolivian Football Federation) Unión Central
9	FW	Juan José Jiménez	23 July 1941 (aged 30)			(Bolivian Football Federation) The Strongest
10	MF	Nicolás Linares	6 December 1945 (aged 26)			(Bolivian Football Federation) Deportivo Municipal
11	MF	Ramiro Blacut	23 January 1948 (aged 24)			(Peruvian Football Federation) Melgar
12	GK	Edwin Frey Barba	26 September 1943 (aged 28)			(Bolivian Football Federation) Club Blooming
13	DF	Celin Garrido				(Ecuadorian Football Federation) L.D.U. Quito
14	DF	Luis Hernán Cayo Thames	19 August 1946 (aged 25)			(Bolivian Football Federation) Bolivar
15	FW	Víctor Barrientos Gonzáles	8 May 1952 (aged 20)			(Bolivian Football Federation) The Strongest
16	DF	Bernardino Vargas				(Bolivian Football Federation)
17	MF	Ovidio Messa	12 December 1952 (aged 19)			(Bolivian Football Federation) Chaco Petrolero
18	MF	Porfirio Jiménez	16 February 1952 (aged 20)			(Bolivian Football Federation) Guabirá
19	GK	Ruben Tito Saavedra	12 June 1946 (aged 25)			(Bolivian Football Federation) Oriente Petrolero
20	MF	Gerson Balcazar	1 June 1949 (aged 23)			(Bolivian Football Federation) C.D.L. Cochabamba
21	FW	Arturo Saucedo Landa	4 September 1951 (aged 20)			(Bolivian Football Federation) Oriente Petrolero
22	DF	Miguel Ángel Antelo	26 January 1951 (aged 21)			(Bolivian Football Federation) Oriente Petrolero
23	FW	Jose Campos	18 November 1942 (aged 29)			(Bolivian Football Federation) Blooming
24	MF	Raúl Alberto Morales	4 June 1951 (aged 21)			(Bolivian Football Federation) Bolívar
25	MF	Hugo Pérez	4 July 1948 (aged 23)			(Bolivian Football Federation) Jorge Wilstermann
26	FW	Jose Gonzalez	6 October 1944 (aged 27)			(Bolivian Football Federation) Mariscal Santa Cruz
27	MF	Mario Pariente Renjel	18 December 1944 (aged 27)			(Bolivian Football Federation) The Strongest
28	FW	Jaime Alberto Morales	10 September 1943 (aged 28)			(Bolivian Football Federation) Nacional Potosí

== Brazil ==
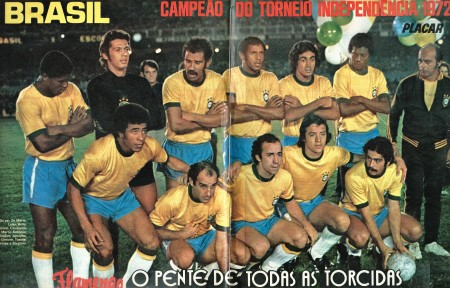
The Brazil squad for the Brazil Independence Cup.

Head coach: (Brazil) Mário Zagallo

No.	Pos.	Player	Date of birth (age)	Caps	Club
1	GK	Émerson Leão	11 July 1949 (aged 22)		(Brazil) Palmeiras
2	DF	Zé Maria	18 May 1949 (aged 23)		(Brazil) Corinthians
3	DF	Brito	9 August 1939 (aged 32)		(Brazil) Botafogo
4	DF	Vantuir	16 November 1949 (aged 22)		(Brazil) Atlético Mineiro
5	MF	Clodoaldo	26 September 1949 (aged 22)		(Brazil) Santos
6	DF	Marco Antônio	6 February 1951 (aged 21)		(Brazil) Fluminense
7	FW	Jairzinho	25 December 1944 (aged 27)		(Brazil) Botafogo
8	MF	Gérson	11 January 1941 (aged 31)		(Brazil) São Paulo
9	FW	Dadá Maravilha	4 March 1946 (aged 26)		(Brazil) Atlético Mineiro
10	MF	Rivellino	1 January 1946 (aged 26)		(Brazil) Corinthians
11	FW	Lula	16 November 1946 (aged 25)		(Brazil) Fluminense
12	GK	Sérgio Valentim	22 May 1945 (aged 27)		(Brazil) São Paulo
13	DF	Rodrigues Neto	6 December 1949 (aged 22)		(Brazil) Flamengo
14	MF	Wilson Piazza	25 February 1943 (aged 29)		(Brazil) Cruzeiro
15	FW	Tostão	25 January 1947 (aged 25)		(Brazil) Vasco da Gama
16	DF	Luís Carlos Galter	27 October 1947 (aged 24)		(Brazil) Corinthians
17	FW	Leivinha	11 September 1949 (aged 22)		(Brazil) Palmeiras
18	DF	Eurico	3 April 1948 (aged 24)		(Brazil) Palmeiras
19	DF	Marinho Peres	19 March 1947 (aged 25)		(Brazil) Santos
20	FW	Rogério Hetmanek	2 August 1948 (aged 23)		(Brazil) Flamengo
21	MF	Dirceu Lopes	3 September 1946 (aged 25)		(Brazil) Cruzeiro
22	MF	Caju	16 June 1949 (aged 22)		(Brazil) Botafogo
23	GK	Félix	24 December 1937 (aged 34)		(Brazil) Fluminense
24	FW	Vaguinho	4 March 1955 (aged 17)		(Brazil) Corinthians
25	DF	Marinho Peres	19 March 1947 (aged 25)		(Brazil) Santos
26	FW	Fedato	8 August 1948 (aged 23)		(Brazil) Palmeiras
27	MF	Palhinha	11 June 1950 (aged 22)		(Brazil) Cruzeiro
28	FW	Zequinha	17 November 1948 (aged 23)		(Brazil) Botafogo de Futebol

== Chile ==
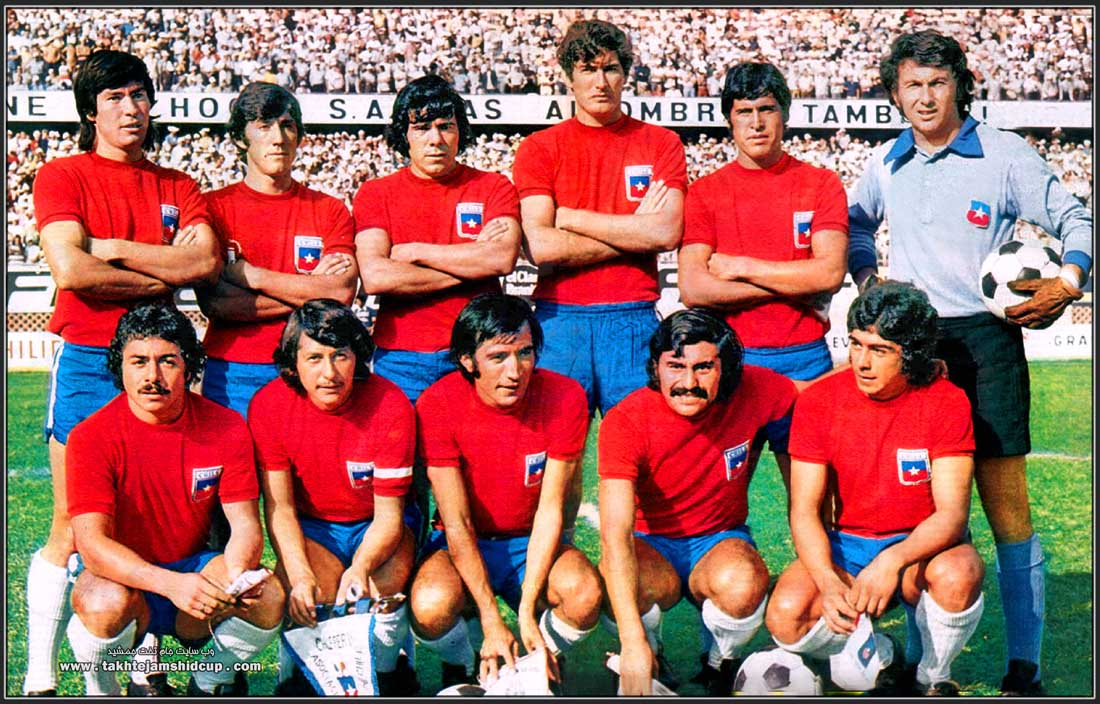
The Chile squad for the Brazil Independence Cup.

Head coach: (West Germany) Rudi Gutendorf

No.	Pos.	Player	Date of birth (age)	Caps	Club
1	GK	Adolfo Nef	18 January 1946 (aged 26)		Universidad de Chile
2	DF	Guillermo Azócar Caris	19 June 1946 (aged 25)		(Chile) Huachipato
3	DF	Raúl Angulo	16 January 1944 (aged 28)		(Chile) Unión Española
4	DF	Francisco Pinochet	15 December 1947 (aged 24)		(Chile) Deportes Concepcion
5	MF	Francisco Valdés	19 March 1943 (aged 29)		(Chile) Colo-Colo
6	DF	Hugo Berly	31 December 1941 (aged 30)		(Chile) Union Española
7	FW	Leonardo Véliz	3 September 1945 (aged 26)		(Chile) Unión Española
8	MF	Alfonso Lara	29 November 1937 (aged 34)		(Chile) Lota Schwager
9	FW	Alberto Fouillioux	22 November 1940 (aged 31)		(Chile) Unión Española
10	MF	Patricio Peralta	12 April 1943 (aged 29)		(Chile) Everton
11	MF	Manuel Gaete	5 January 1948 (aged 24)		(Chile) Unión San Felipe
12	GK	Leopoldo Vallejos	16 July 1944 (aged 27)		(Chile) Unión Española
13	MF	Daniel Orlando Díaz	7 August 1948 (aged 23)		(Chile) Huachipato
14	DF	Antonio Arias	9 October 1944 (aged 27)		(Chile) Unión Española
15	DF	Luis Pérez	12 April 1947 (aged 25)		(Chile)
16	MF	Fernando Carvallo	24 September 1948 (aged 23)		(Chile) Unión San Felipe
17	FW	Fernando Espinoza	1 February 1949 (aged 23)		(Chile) Magallanes
18	FW	Carlos Caszely	5 July 1950 (aged 21)		(Chile) Colo-Colo
19	DF	Gustavo Laube	9 April 1944 (aged 28)		(Chile) Magallanes
20	MF	Sergio Ramírez Maulén	12 September 1943 (aged 28)		(Chile) Huachipato
21	GK	Manuel Astorga	15 May 1937 (aged 35)		(Chile) Magallanes
22	MF	Francisco Las Heras	21 August 1949 (aged 22)		Universidad de Chile
23	FW	Julio Crisosto	21 March 1950 (aged 22)		(Chile) Universidad Católica
24	MF	Juan Machuca	7 March 1951 (aged 21)		(Chile) Unión Española
25	FW	Luis Pino	25 October 1947 (aged 24)		(Chile) Unión Española
26	MF	Eduardo Peralta	18 April 1947 (aged 25)		Universidad de Chile
27	MF	Fernando Espinoza Moreira	1 February 1949 (aged 23)		(Chile) Magallanes
28	MF	Rogelio Farías	13 August 1949 (aged 22)		(Chile) Unión Española

== Colombia ==
Head coach: (Socialist Federal Republic of Yugoslavia) Todor Veselinović

No.	Pos.	Player	Date of birth (age)	Caps	Club
1	GK	Pedro Zape	3 June 1949 (aged 23)		(Colombia) Deportivo Cali
2	DF	Gerardo Moncada	27 May 1949 (aged 23)		(Colombia) Atlético Nacional
3	DF	Jaime Rodríguez Suárez	16 December 1947 (aged 24)		(Colombia) Independiente Santa Fe
4	DF	Jesús Rubio	29 March 1945 (aged 27)		(Colombia) Millonarios
5	MF	Adolfo Andrade	5 January 1950 (aged 22)		(Colombia) Deportivo Cali
6	DF	Óscar López	2 April 1939 (aged 33)		(Colombia) Deportivo Cali
7	FW	Luis Augusto García	15 July 1950 (aged 21)		(Colombia) Independiente Santa Fe
8	MF	Álvaro Contreras	3 August 1947 (aged 24)		(Colombia) Deportivo Cali
9	FW	Fabio Espinosa	13 June 1948 (aged 23)		(Colombia) Deportes Tolima
10	MF	Alfonso Cañón	20 March 1946 (aged 26)		(Colombia) Independiente Santa Fe
11	MF	Orlando Mesa	4 December 1947 (aged 24)		(Colombia) Deportivo Cali
12	GK	Silvio Quintero	13 April 1950 (aged 22)		(Colombia) Deportes Tolima
13	FW	Víctor Campaz	21 May 1949 (aged 23)		(Colombia) Independiente Santa Fe
14	MF	Alfonso Tovar	2 August 1947 (aged 24)		(Colombia) Deportes Quindío
15	DF	Óscar Ortega	5 November 1950 (aged 21)		(Colombia) Millonarios
16	FW	Edgar Angulo	2 March 1947 (aged 25)		(Colombia) Atlético Nacional
17	DF	Álvaro Calle	25 May 1953 (aged 19)		(Colombia) Independiente Medellin
18	FW	Alfredo Arango	16 February 1945 (aged 27)		(Colombia) Millonarios
19	FW	Hernando Piñeros	14 October 1943 (aged 28)		(Colombia) Atlético Nacional
20	MF	Alejandro Brand	15 May 1950 (aged 22)		(Colombia) Millonarios
21	DF	Gabriel Alonso Hernández	1 January 1942 (aged 30)		(Colombia) Millonarios
22	GK	Víctor Cañón	8 March 1939 (aged 33)		(Colombia) Atlético Nacional
23	FW	Carlos Alberto Lugo	1 September 1953 (aged 18)		(Colombia) Tolima
24	DF	Francisco Maturana	15 February 1949 (aged 23)		(Colombia) Independiente Medellin
25	FW	Jaime Morón	16 November 1950 (aged 21)		(Colombia) Millonarios
26	FW	Américo Quiñones	16 April 1953 (aged 19)		(Colombia) Millonarios
27	FW	Eduardo Retat	16 June 1948 (aged 23)		(Colombia) Atlético Nacional
28	FW	Germán González	14 June 1947 (aged 24)		(Colombia) Deportivo Cali

== CONCACAF ==
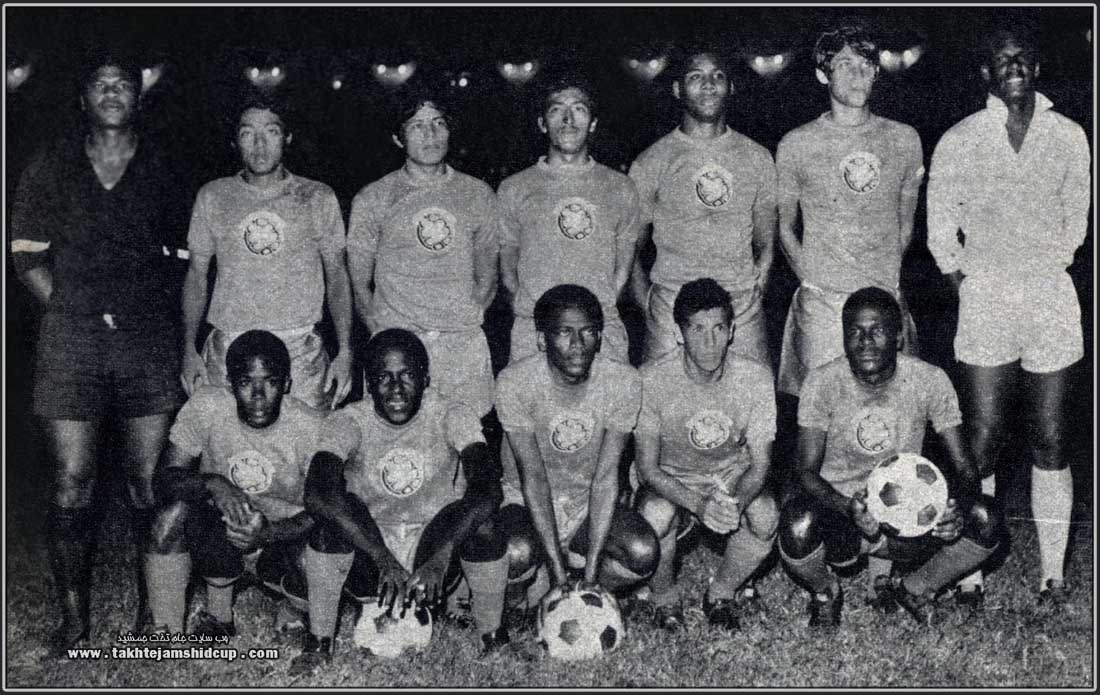
The CONCACAF squad for the Brazil Independence Cup.

Head coaches: Antoine Tassy (Haiti) and Carlos Padilla Velásquez (Honduras)

No.	Pos.	Player	Date of birth (age)	Caps	Club
1	GK	Gerald Figeroux	23 May 1943 (aged 29)		(Trinidad and Tobago) Culture United
2	DF	Wilner Nazaire	30 March 1950 (aged 22)		(Haiti) Haïtien
3	DF	Miguel Ángel Matamoros	10 May 1949 (aged 23)		(Honduras) Olimpia
4	DF	Fernando Bulnes	21 October 1946 (aged 25)		(Honduras) Olimpia
5	MF	Jean-Claude Désir	8 August 1946 (aged 25)		(Haiti) Aigle Noir
6	DF	Selvin Cárcamo	25 May 1949 (aged 23)		(Honduras) Olimpia
7	FW	Claude Barthélemy	9 May 1945 (aged 27)		(Haiti) Haïtien
8	MF	Philippe Vorbe	14 September 1947 (aged 24)		(Haiti) Zénith
9	FW	Edwin Schal	4 October 1944 (aged 27)		(Suriname (Kingdom of the Netherlands)) Transvaal
10	MF	Mario Velarde	29 March 1940 (aged 32)		(Mexico) UNAM
11	MF	Ramón Cruz Colindres	3 May 1946 (aged 26)		(Honduras) Real España
12	MF	Ángel Paz	28 October 1950 (aged 21)		(Honduras) Olimpia
13	DF	José Luis Cruz	9 February 1952 (aged 20)		(Honduras) Motagua
14	MF	Guy François	18 September 1947 (aged 24)		(Haiti) Violette
15	DF	Gary Rensing	5 October 1947 (aged 24)		(United States) St. Louis Stars
16	FW	Emmanuel Sanon	9 May 1951 (aged 21)		(Haiti) Don Bosco
17	GK	Henri Françillon	26 May 1949 (aged 23)		(Haiti) Victory
18	FW	Jorge Urquía	19 June 1950 (aged 21)		(Honduras) Olimpia
19	MF	Buzz Parsons	16 December 1950 (aged 21)		(Canada) Vancouver Columbus
20	FW	Noel Simmons	15 March 1941 (aged 31)		(Bermuda) Zebras
21	MF	Francisco Flores	30 May 1949 (aged 23)		(Mexico) Cruz Azul
22	GK	Vester Constantine	23 September 1938 (aged 33)		(Jamaica) Harbour View
23	FW	Óscar Rolando Hernández	10 June 1950 (aged 22)		(Honduras) Motagua
24	FW	Wenall Trott	19 January 1947 (aged 25)		(Bermuda) Robin Hood
26	FW	Manuel Cuadra	25 August 1947 (aged 24)		(Nicaragua) Flor de Caña
27	FW	Dieter Ficken	14 June 1944 (aged 27)		(United States) Eintracht New York
28	DF	Brian Robinson	29 June 1948 (aged 23)		(Canada) Victoria Royals

== Czechoslovakia ==
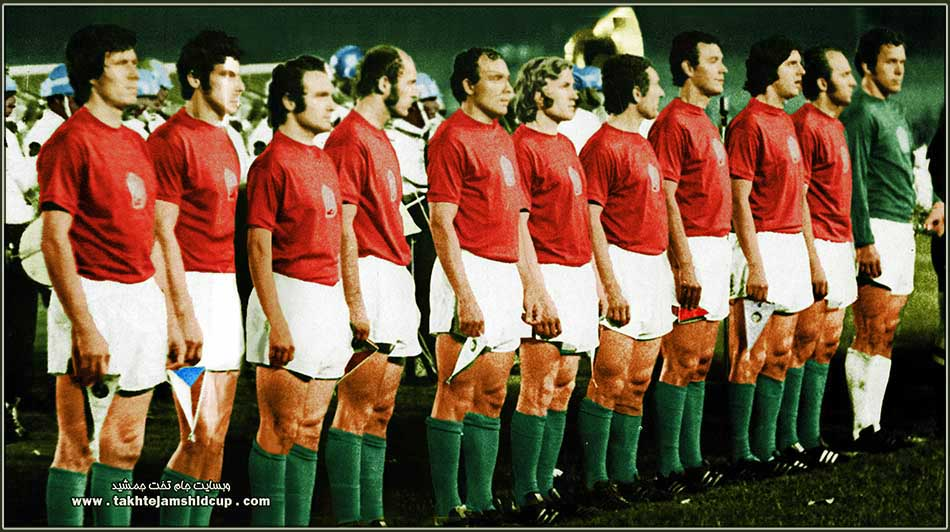
The Czechoslovakia squad in the final group stage of the Brazil Independence Cup.

Head coach: (Czechoslovakia) Václav Ježek

No.	Pos.	Player	Date of birth (age)	Caps	Goals	Club
1	GK	Ivo Viktor	21 May 1942 (aged 30)			(Football Association of the Czech Republic) Dukla Dejvice
2	DF	Karol Dobiaš	18 December 1947 (aged 24)			(Football Association of the Czech Republic) Spartak Trnava
3	DF	Vladimír Hagara	7 November 1943 (aged 28)			(Football Association of the Czech Republic) Spartak Trnava
4	DF	Ján Pivarník	13 November 1947 (aged 24)			(Football Association of the Czech Republic) Slovan Bratislava
5	MF	Anton Hrušecký	2 January 1942 (aged 30)			(Football Association of the Czech Republic) Spartak Trnava
6	MF	Vladimír Ternény	18 April 1947 (aged 25)			(Football Association of the Czech Republic) AC Nitra
7	FW	Ján Čapkovič	11 January 1948 (aged 24)			(Football Association of the Czech Republic) Slovan Bratislava
8	MF	Ladislav Kuna	3 April 1947 (aged 25)			(Football Association of the Czech Republic) Spartak Trnava
9	FW	Dušan Kabát	20 August 1944 (aged 27)			(Football Association of the Czech Republic) Spartak Trnava
10	MF	Ján Medviď	18 August 1946 (aged 25)			(Football Association of the Czech Republic) Slovan Bratislava
11	FW	Jozef Adamec	26 February 1942 (aged 30)			(Football Association of the Czech Republic) Spartak Trnava
12	MF	Jaroslav Pollák	11 July 1947 (aged 24)			(Football Association of the Czech Republic) VSS Košice
13	DF	Libor Radimec	22 May 1950 (aged 22)			(Football Association of the Czech Republic) Baník Ostrava
14	MF	Pavel Stratil	17 April 1945 (aged 27)			(Football Association of the Czech Republic) Sklo Union Teplice
15	DF	Ľudovít Zlocha	17 May 1945 (aged 27)			(Football Association of the Czech Republic) Slovan Bratislava
16	GK	Jaroslav Červeňan	16 April 1947 (aged 25)			(Football Association of the Czech Republic) Tatran Prešov
17	FW	Milan Albrecht	16 July 1950 (aged 21)			(Football Association of the Czech Republic) Jednota Trenčín
18	MF	Jozef Móder	19 September 1947 (aged 24)			(Football Association of the Czech Republic) Dukla Dejvice
19	DF	Václav Migas	16 September 1944 (aged 27)			(Football Association of the Czech Republic) Sparta Prague
20	MF	Ján Geleta	13 September 1943 (aged 28)			(Football Association of the Czech Republic) Dukla Dejvice
21	DF	Albert Rusnák	18 May 1948 (aged 24)			(Football Association of the Czech Republic) Žilina
22	GK	Alexander Vencel	8 February 1944 (aged 28)			(Football Association of the Czech Republic) Slovan Bratislava
23	FW	František Veselý	7 December 1943 (aged 28)			(Football Association of the Czech Republic) Slavia Prague
24	MF	Igor Novák	10 August 1944 (aged 27)			(Football Association of the Czech Republic) Tatran Prešov
25	FW	Jiří Klement	31 March 1948 (aged 24)			(Football Association of the Czech Republic) Baník Ostrava
26	DF	Milan Staškovan	3 June 1947 (aged 25)			(Football Association of the Czech Republic) Žilina
27	MF	Andrej Danko	26 February 1948 (aged 24)			(Football Association of the Czech Republic) Košice
28	FW	Štefan Tománek	22 April 1948 (aged 24)			(Football Association of the Czech Republic) Žilina

== Ecuador ==
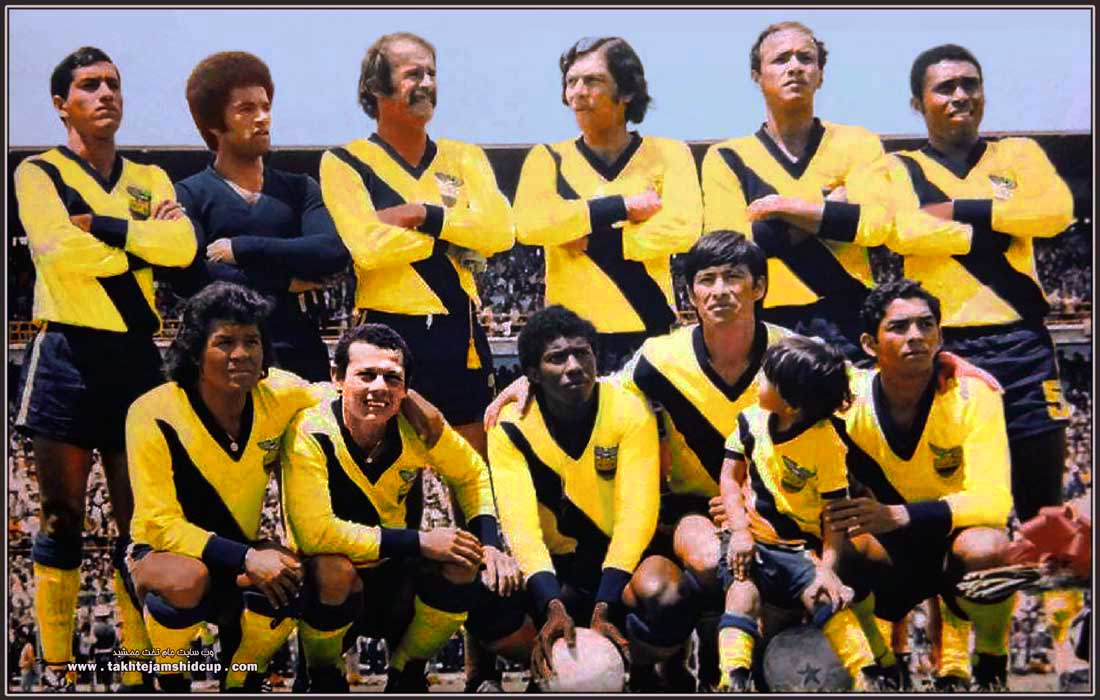
The Ecuador squad for the Brazil Independence Cup.

Head coach: Jorge Enrique Lazo Logroño

No.	Pos.	Player	Date of birth (age)	Caps	Club
1	GK	Fernando Gilberto Maldonado	12 January 1945 (aged 27)		(Ecuador) El Nacional
2	DF	Víctor Peláez	12 February 1947 (aged 25)		(Ecuador) Barcelona
3	DF	Jefferson Camacho	18 May 1949 (aged 23)		(Ecuador) Emelec
4	DF	Rafael Guerrero	28 December 1950 (aged 21)		(Ecuador) Emelec
5	MF	Juan Raúl Noriega	2 February 1943 (aged 29)		(Ecuador) Barcelona
6	MF	Miguel Ángel Coronel	30 September 1952 (aged 19)		(Ecuador) Barcelona
7	FW	Félix Lasso	28 May 1945 (aged 27)		(Ecuador) Emelec
8	MF	Walter Cárdenas	17 January 1944 (aged 28)		(Ecuador) Barcelona
9	FW	Alberto Spencer	6 December 1937 (aged 34)		(Ecuador) L.D.U. Quito
10	MF	Jorge Tapia	10 April 1949 (aged 23)		(Ecuador) Barcelona
11	FW	Marco Antonio Guime	25 April 1949 (aged 23)		(Ecuador) Emelec
12	GK	Carlos Omar Delgado	7 February 1949 (aged 23)		(Ecuador) Emelec
13	FW	Raúl Patricio Peñaherrera	15 March 1946 (aged 26)		(Ecuador) El Nacional
14	DF	Jesús Emilio Ortiz	25 December 1947 (aged 24)		(Ecuador) Emelec
15	MF	Luis Escalante	19 January 1945 (aged 27)		(Ecuador) El Nacional
16	DF	Carlos Germano Campoverde	26 November 1951 (aged 20)		(Ecuador) El Nacional
17	MF	Carlos Torres Garcés	15 August 1951 (aged 20)		(Ecuador) El Nacional
18	FW	Armando Larrea	11 May 1943 (aged 29)		(Ecuador) Universidad Católica
19	FW	Ítalo Estupiñán	1 January 1952 (aged 20)		(Ecuador) Macará
20	GK	Adolfo Bolaños	24 September 1938 (aged 33)		(Ecuador) L.D.U. Quito
21	MF	Jorge Bolaños	26 June 1944 (aged 27)		(Ecuador) Barcelona
22	MF	Miguel Coronel	30 September 1952 (aged 19)		(Ecuador) Barcelona
23	FW	Héctor Morales Altamirano	15 July 1944 (aged 27)		(Ecuador) Macará
24	FW	Romulo Dudar Mina	15 July 1944 (aged 27)		(Ecuador) Macará
26	FW	Cristóbal Mantilla	28 November 1949 (aged 22)		(Ecuador) Universidad Católica
27	MF	Marcelo Cabezas	5 April 1945 (aged 27)		(Ecuador) El Nacional
28	MF	Jesús Emilio Ortiz	25 December 1947 (aged 24)		(Ecuador) Emelec

== France ==
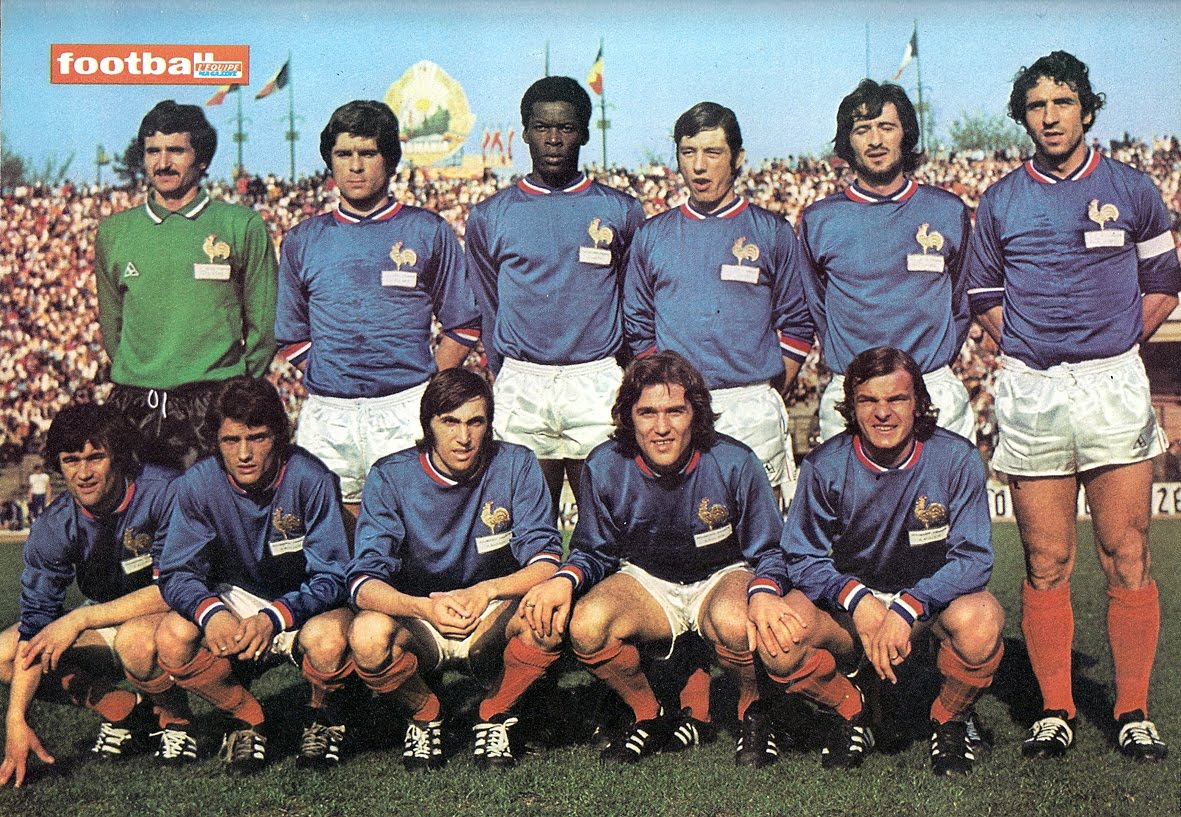
The France squad in a friendly against Romania in 1972.

Head coach: Georges Boulogne

No.	Pos.	Player	Date of birth (age)	Caps	Club
1	GK	Dominique Baratelli	26 December 1947 (aged 24)		(France) Nice
2	DF	Claude Quittet	12 March 1941 (aged 31)		(France) Nice
3	DF	Marius Trésor	15 January 1950 (aged 22)		(France) Marseille
4	DF	Jean-Paul Rostagni	14 January 1948 (aged 24)		(France) Paris Saint-Germain
5	MF	Henri Michel	28 October 1947 (aged 24)		(France) Nantes
6	DF	Jean Djorkaeff	27 October 1939 (aged 32)		(France) Paris Saint-Germain
7	FW	Georges Lech	2 June 1945 (aged 27)		(France) Sochaux
8	MF	Serge Chiesa	25 December 1950 (aged 21)		(France) Lyon
9	FW	Jean-François Jodar	2 December 1949 (aged 22)		(France) Reims
10	MF	Michel Mézy	15 August 1948 (aged 23)		(France) Nîmes
11	FW	Jean-Pierre Adams	10 March 1948 (aged 24)		(France) Nîmes
12	DF	Georges Bereta	15 May 1946 (aged 26)		(France) Saint-Étienne
13	FW	Charly Loubet	26 January 1946 (aged 26)		(France) Marseille
14	DF	Roger Lemerre	18 June 1941 (aged 30)		(France) Nantes
15	MF	Jean-Michel Larqué	8 September 1947 (aged 24)		(France) Saint-Étienne
16	GK	Georges Carnus	13 August 1942 (aged 29)		(France) Marseille
17	FW	Bernard Blanchet	1 December 1943 (aged 28)		(France) Nantes
18	MF	José Broissart	20 February 1947 (aged 25)		(France) Saint-Étienne
19	FW	Hervé Revelli	5 June 1946 (aged 26)		(France) Nice
20	DF	Jacky Novi	18 July 1946 (aged 25)		(France) Marseille
21	FW	Marc Molitor	21 September 1948 (aged 23)		(France) Strasbourg
22	GK	Jean-Michel Fouché	18 July 1946 (aged 25)		(France) Nantes
23	FW	Louis Floch	28 December 1947 (aged 24)		(France) Monaco
24	MF	Robert Rico	10 March 1945 (aged 27)		(France) Reims
25	FW	Fleury Di Nallo	20 April 1943 (aged 29)		(France) Lyon
26	MF	Jean-Noël Huck	20 December 1948 (aged 23)		(France) Nice
27	FW	Jacques Vergnes	20 December 1948 (aged 23)		(France) Nîmes
28	DF	Francis Camerini	25 January 1948 (aged 24)		(France) Nice

== Iran ==
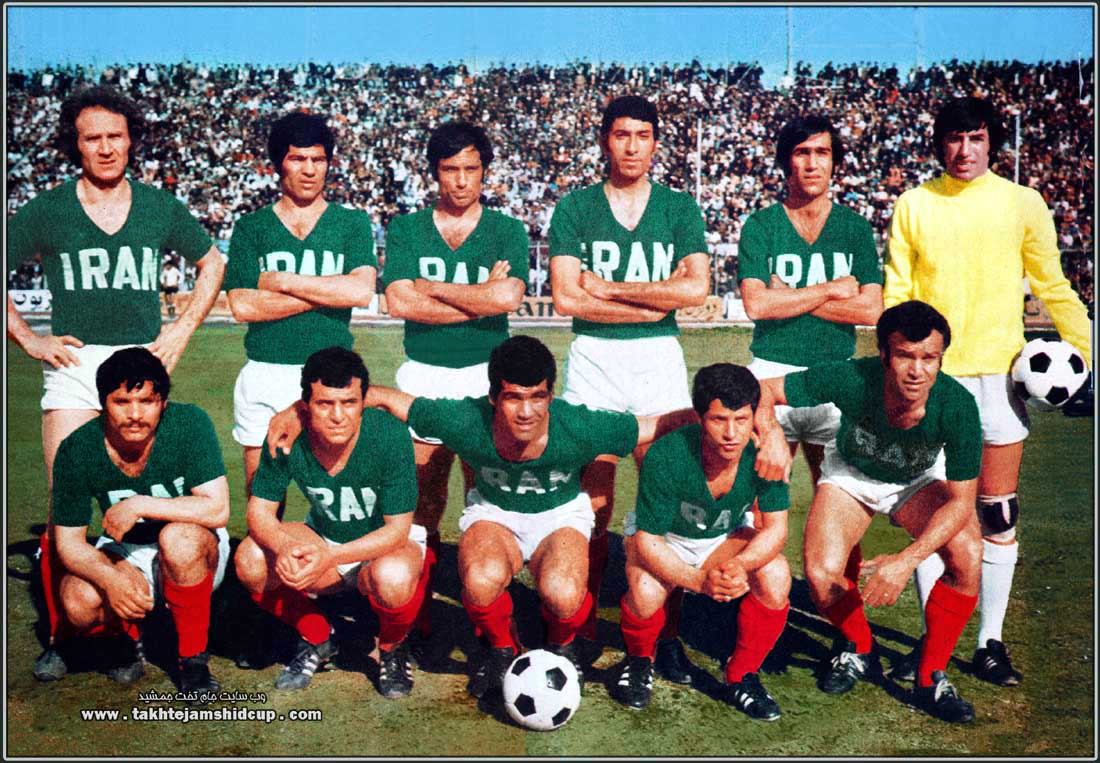
The Iran squad in a friendly against Uruguay in 1972.

Head coach: (Iran) Mohammad Ranjbar

No.	Pos.	Player	Date of birth (age)	Caps	Club
1	GK	Nasser Hejazi	19 December 1949 (aged 25)		(Iran) Esteghlal
2	DF	Safar Iranpak	23 December 1947 (aged 27)		(Iran) Persepolis
3	DF	Majid Halvaei	7 February 1948 (aged 27)		(Iran) Pas
4	DF	Mehdi Monajati	25 December 1954 (aged 20)		(Iran) Pas
5	MF	Mohammad Sadeghi	16 March 1952 (aged 23)		(Iran) Pas
6	DF	Mostafa Arab	31 December 1942 (aged 32)		(Iran) Oghab
7	FW	Hossein Kalani	23 January 1945 (aged 30)		(Iran) Persepolis
8	MF	Ali Parvin	12 October 1947 (aged 27)		(Iran) Persepolis
9	FW	Alireza Hajghasem	19 March 1943 (aged 32)		(Iran) Esteghlal
10	MF	Javad Ghorab	30 July 1949 (aged 25)		(Iran) Esteghlal
11	MF	Parviz Ghelichkhani	4 September 1945 (aged 29)		(Iran) Pas
12	GK	Bahram Mavaddat	30 January 1950 (aged 25)		(Iran) Persepolis
13	MF	Karo Haghverdian	11 January 1945 (aged 30)		(Iran) Esteghlal
14	FW	Gholam Hossein Mazloumi	20 March 1950 (aged 25)		(Iran) Esteghlal
15	DF	Jafar Kashani	21 March 1944 (aged 31)		(Iran) Persepolis
16	DF	Akbar Kargarjam	26 December 1947 (aged 27)		(Iran) Esteghlal
17	FW	Gholam Vafakhah	23 February 1947 (aged 28)		(Iran) Taj
18	FW	Mahmoud Khordbin	24 September 1948 (aged 26)		(Iran) Persepolis
19	DF	Nasrollah Abdollahi	2 September 1951 (aged 23)		(Iran) Homa
20	MF	Ali Jabbari	20 July 1946 (aged 29)		(Iran) Taj
21	GK	Mansour Rashidi	1 July 1946 (aged 29)		(Iran) Taj
22	FW	Alireza Khorshidi	16 May 1951 (aged 24)		(Iran) Homa
23	DF	Ebrahim Ashtiani	4 January 1952 (aged 23)		(Iran) Persepolis
24	DF	Mehdi Lavasani	11 July 1947 (aged 28)		(Iran) Taj
25	MF	Fereydoun Moeini	23 August 1946 (aged 28)		(Iran) Persepolis
26	DF	Javad Allahverdi	9 April 1952 (aged 23)		(Iran) Taj
27	MF	Alireza Azizi	14 January 1949 (aged 26)		(Iran) Homa
28	FW	Asghar Sharafi	22 December 1942 (aged 32)		(Iran) Pas

== Republic of Ireland ==
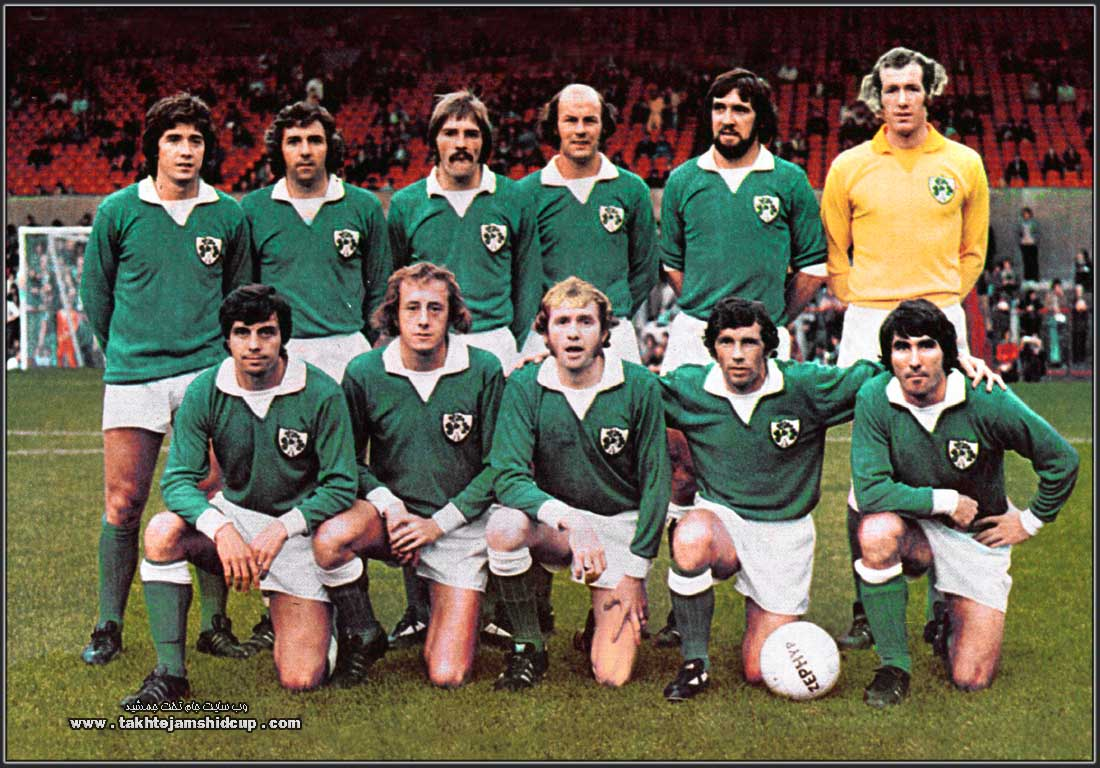
The Republic of Ireland squad for the Brazil Independence Cup.

Head coach: (Republic of Ireland) Liam Tuohy

No.	Pos.	Player	Date of birth (age)	Caps	Goals	Club
1	GK	Alan Kelly, sr	5 July 1936 (aged 35)			(The Football Association) Preston North End
2	DF	John Dempsey	15 March 1946 (aged 26)			(The Football Association) Chelsea
3	DF	Joe Kinnear	27 December 1946 (aged 25)			(The Football Association) Tottenham Hotspur
4	DF	Paddy Mulligan	17 March 1945 (aged 27)			(The Football Association) Chelsea
5	MF	Noel Campbell	11 December 1949 (aged 22)			(German Football Association) Fortuna Köln
6	DF	Jimmy Holmes	11 November 1953 (aged 18)			(The Football Association) Coventry City
7	FW	Don Givens	9 August 1949 (aged 22)			(The Football Association) Luton Town
8	MF	Eamonn Rogers	16 April 1947 (aged 25)			(The Football Association) Charlton Athletic
9	FW	Turlough O'Connor	27 July 1946 (aged 25)			(Football Association of Ireland) Dundalk
10	MF	Miah Dennehy	29 March 1953 (aged 19)			(Football Association of Ireland) Cork Hibernians
11	FW	Mick Leech	6 August 1948 (aged 23)			(Football Association of Ireland) Shamrock Rovers
12	MF	Mick Martin	9 July 1951 (aged 20)			(Football Association of Ireland) Bohemians
13	DF	Tommy Carroll	18 August 1942 (aged 29)			(The Football Association) Birmingham City
14	FW	Ray Treacy	18 June 1946 (aged 25)			(The Football Association) Swindon Town
15	MF	Mick Fairclough	22 October 1952 (aged 19)			(The Football Association) Huddersfield Town
16	GK	Paddy Roche	4 January 1951 (aged 21)			(Football Association of Ireland) Shelbourne
17	MF	Andy McEvoy	15 July 1938 (aged 33)			(Football Association of Ireland) Limerick
18	FW	John Herrick	30 November 1946 (aged 25)			(Football Association of Ireland) Cork Hibernians
19	DF	Tommy McConville	19 March 1946 (aged 26)			(Football Association of Ireland) Waterford United
20	FW	Brendan Hannigan	3 September 1944 (aged 27)			(Football Association of Ireland) St Patrick's Athletic
21	GK	Peter Thomas	20 November 1944 (aged 27)			(Football Association of Ireland) Waterford United
22	MF	David Pugh	9 July 1943 (aged 28)			(Football Association of Ireland) Sligo Rovers
23	DF	Fran Brennan	14 February 1940 (aged 32)			(Football Association of Ireland) Dundalk
24	MF	Eamon Dunphy	3 August 1945 (aged 26)			(The Football Association) Millwall
25	FW	Damien Richardson	2 August 1947 (aged 24)			(Football Association of Ireland) Shamrock Rovers
26	MF	Ronnie Nolan	22 October 1933 (aged 38)			(Football Association of Ireland) Bohemians
27	FW	Amby Fogarty	11 September 1933 (aged 38)			(Football Association of Ireland) Drumcondra
28	MF	Philip Buck	1 January 1944 (aged 28)			(Football Association of Ireland) Waterford United

== Paraguay ==
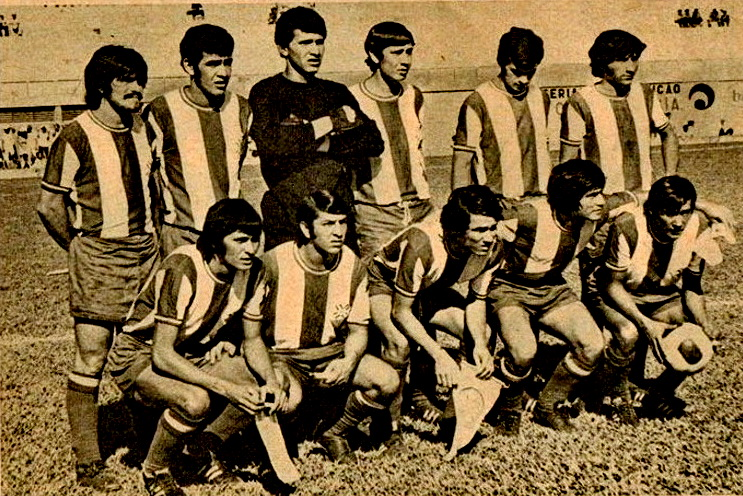
The Paraguay squad for the Brazil Independence Cup.

Head coach: Aurelio González

No.	Pos.	Player	Date of birth (age)	Caps	Club
1	GK	Alcides Báez	17 January 1947 (aged 25)		(Paraguay) Rubio Ñu
2	DF	Pedro Molinas	1 August 1942 (aged 29)		(Paraguay) Olimpia
3	MF	Américo Godoy	10 June 1951 (aged 21)		(Paraguay) Olimpia
4	DF	Alcides Sosa	24 March 1944 (aged 28)		(Paraguay) Olimpia
5	MF	Cristóbal Maldonado	12 October 1950 (aged 21)		(Paraguay) Libertad
6	MF	Lorenzo Espinoza	10 June 1943 (aged 29)		(Paraguay) Nacional
7	FW	Saturnino Arrúa	7 April 1949 (aged 23)		(Paraguay) Cerro Porteño
8	MF	Carlos Martínez Diarte	26 January 1954 (aged 18)		(Paraguay) Olimpia
9	FW	Crispín García Maciel	14 February 1951 (aged 21)		(Paraguay) Sol de América
10	FW	Bernardo Acosta Miranda	20 August 1944 (aged 27)		(Spain) Sevilla
11	MF	Carlos Jara Saguier	25 August 1950 (aged 21)		(Paraguay) Cerro Porteño
12	GK	José de La Cruz Benítez	3 May 1952 (aged 20)		(Paraguay) Olimpia
13	MF	Emigdio dos Santos	23 October 1938 (aged 33)		(Paraguay) Libertad
14	FW	Lorenzo Jiménez Roa	10 August 1944 (aged 27)		(Paraguay) Olimpia
15	DF	Valentin Mendoza	14 February 1945 (aged 27)		(Paraguay) Cerro Porteño
16	MF	Tito Ramón Correa	30 April 1951 (aged 21)		(Paraguay) Olimpia
17	FW	Jorge Insfrán	27 July 1950 (aged 21)		(Paraguay) Olimpia
18	FW	Adalberto Escobar	23 April 1949 (aged 23)		(Paraguay) Cerro Porteño
19	FW	Crispín Verza	24 October 1952 (aged 19)		(Paraguay) Olimpia
20	MF	Pedro Bareiro	18 January 1951 (aged 21)		(Paraguay) Cerro Porteño
21	DF	Luis Cesar Ortiz Aquino	25 August 1949 (aged 22)		(Paraguay) Cerro Porteño
22	GK	Raimundo Aguilera	7 January 1949 (aged 23)		(Paraguay) Guaraní
23	FW	Benjamín Cáceres	31 July 1945 (aged 26)		(Spain) Mallorca
24	FW	Evelio Villalba	11 May 1945 (aged 27)		(Paraguay) Olimpia
25	FW	Carlos José Báez	1 November 1953 (aged 18)		(Paraguay) Rubio Ñu
26	DF	Herminio Toñánez	9 March 1946 (aged 26)		(Spain) Sevilla
27	FW	Francisco Riveros	14 February 1951 (aged 21)		(Paraguay) Cerro Porteño
28	DF	Rufino León Diaz (Note: León Diaz would replace Juan Casco who would not participate in the tournament.)	1 April 1952 (aged 20)		(Paraguay) River Plate

== Peru ==
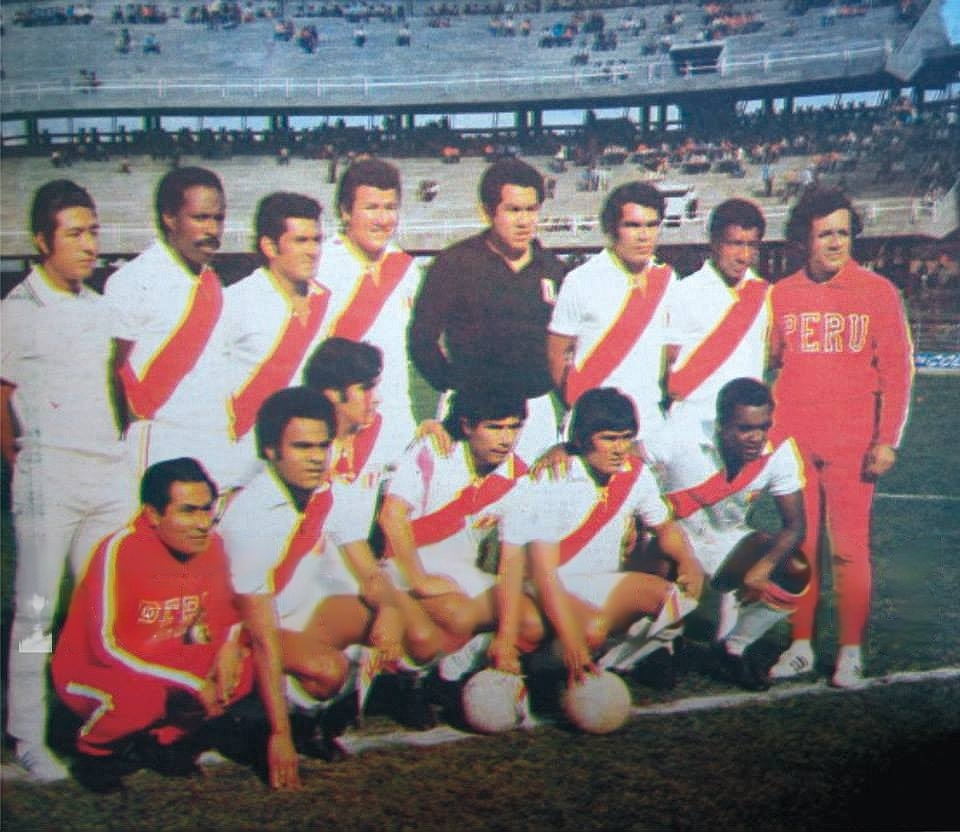
The Peru squad for the Brazil Independence Cup.

Head coach: (Uruguay) Roberto Scarone

No.	Pos.	Player	Date of birth (age)	Caps	Club
1	GK	Luis Rubiños	31 December 1940 (aged 31)		(Peru) Sporting Cristal
2	DF	Eloy Campos	31 May 1942 (aged 30)		(Peru) Sporting Cristal
3	DF	Julio Luna Portal	20 December 1950 (aged 21)		(Peru) Universitario de Deportes
4	DF	Fernando Cuéllar	27 February 1945 (aged 27)		(Peru) Universitario de Deportes
5	MF	Manuel Mayorga	2 January 1943 (aged 29)		(Peru) Alianza Lima
6	MF	César Cueto	16 June 1952 (aged 19)		(Peru) José Gálvez
7	FW	Hugo Sotil	18 May 1949 (aged 23)		(Peru) Deportivo Municipal
8	DF	Héctor Chumpitaz	12 April 1943 (aged 29)		(Peru) Universitario de Deportes
9	FW	Héctor Bailetti	27 August 1945 (aged 26)		(Peru) Universitario
10	MF	Hernán Castañeda	5 August 1952 (aged 19)		(Peru) Universitario
11	MF	Percy Rojas	16 September 1949 (aged 22)		(Peru) Universitario
12	GK	Jesús Goyzueta	8 March 1947 (aged 25)		(Peru) Universitario
13	DF	Alberto Garrido	13 December 1940 (aged 31)		(Peru) José Gálvez
14	FW	Oswaldo Ramírez	28 March 1947 (aged 25)		(Peru) Universitario
15	DF	Orlando de la Torre	21 November 1943 (aged 28)		(Peru) Sporting Cristal
16	FW	Alberto Gallardo	28 November 1940 (aged 31)		(Peru) Sporting Cristal
17	MF	Ramón Mifflin	5 April 1947 (aged 25)		(Peru) Sporting Cristal
18	GK	Manuel Uribe	14 October 1948 (aged 23)		(Peru) Olímpico Callao
19	DF	Eleazar Soria	11 January 1948 (aged 24)		(Peru) Universitario de Deportes
20	FW	Teófilo Cubillas	15 December 1949 (aged 22)		(Peru) Alianza Lima
21	MF	Alfredo Quesada	22 September 1949 (aged 22)		(Peru) Sporting Cristal
22	FW	Juan José Muñante	12 June 1948 (aged 23)		(Peru) Universitario de Deportes
23	MF	José Velásquez	4 June 1954 (aged 18)		(Peru) Alianza Lima
24	FW	Víctor Fernández	16 October 1948 (aged 23)		(Peru) Cienciano
25	FW	Percy Vílchez	15 December 1953 (aged 18)		(Peru) Universitario
26	DF	Rodulfo Manzo	5 June 1949 (aged 23)		(Peru) Defensor Lima
27	DF	Rafael Risco	26 December 1945 (aged 26)		(Peru) Alianza Lima
28	MF	Carlos Urrunaga	6 June 1946 (aged 26)		(Peru) Juan Aurich

== Portugal ==
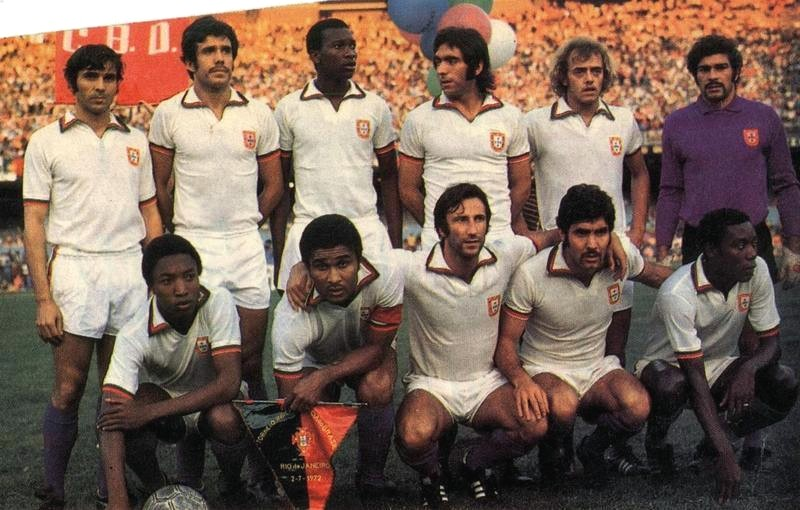
The Portugal squad for the Brazil Independence Cup.

Head coach: José Augusto de Almeida

No.	Pos.	Player	Date of birth (age)	Caps	Club
1	GK	José Henrique	18 May 1943 (aged 29)		(Portugal) Benfica
16	DF	Augusto Matine	13 December 1947 (aged 24)		(Portugal) Benfica
18	DF	Adolfo Calisto	1 January 1944 (aged 28)		(Portugal) Benfica
9	MF	Toni	14 October 1946 (aged 25)		(Portugal) Benfica
	DF	Samuel Fraguito	8 September 1951 (aged 20)		(Portugal) Boavista
12	DF	Artur Correia	18 April 1950 (aged 22)		(Portugal) Benfica
4	FW	Abel Miglietti	4 March 1943 (aged 29)		(Portugal) Porto
	DF	Rolando Gonçalves	11 June 1944 (aged 28)		(Portugal) Porto
13	FW	Eusébio	25 January 1942 (aged 30)		(Portugal) Benfica
	MF	Fernando Niza	19 July 1948 (aged 23)		(Portugal) União de Coimbra
	FW	Chico Faria	9 October 1949 (aged 22)		(Portugal) Sporting
2	GK	Vítor Damas	8 October 1947 (aged 24)		(Portugal) Sporting
11	FW	Nené	20 November 1949 (aged 22)		(Portugal) Benfica
15	FW	Rui Jordão	9 August 1952 (aged 19)		(Portugal) Benfica
7	MF	Fernando Peres	8 January 1942 (aged 30)		(Portugal) Sporting
8	DF	Humberto Coelho	20 April 1950 (aged 22)		(Portugal) Benfica
14	FW	Joaquim Dinis	1 December 1947 (aged 24)		(Portugal) Sporting
19	MF	Jaime Graça	30 January 1942 (aged 30)		(Portugal) Benfica
5	DF	Messias Timula	18 February 1948 (aged 24)		(Portugal) Benfica
17	DF	João Laranjeira	28 September 1951 (aged 20)		(Portugal) Sporting
	DF	Alfredo Murça	17 January 1949 (aged 23)		(Portugal) Porto
3	GK	Félix Mourinho	12 February 1938 (aged 34)		(Portugal) Belenenses
20	FW	Artur Jorge	13 February 1946 (aged 26)		(Portugal) Benfica
	MF	Vítor Esmoriz	16 December 1951 (aged 20)		(Portugal) Atlético
	DF	Carriço	5 February 1943 (aged 29)		(Portugal) Vitória de Setúbal
	DF	Manuel Barbosa Branco	23 September 1944 (aged 27)		(Portugal) Braga
	MF	Octávio Machado	6 May 1949 (aged 23)		(Portugal) Vitória de Setúbal
	FW	Félix Guerreiro	26 July 1945 (aged 26)		(Portugal) Vitória de Setúbal

== Scotland ==
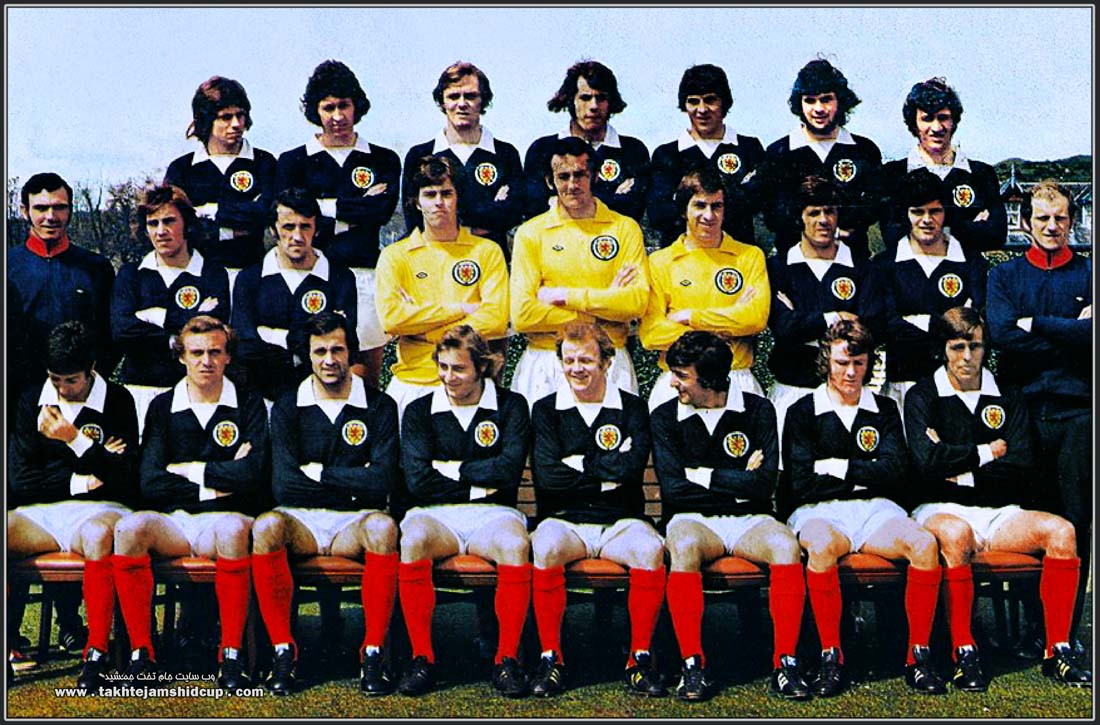
The Scotland squad for the Brazil Independence Squad.

Head coach: Tommy Docherty

No.	Pos.	Player	Date of birth (age)	Caps	Club
1	GK	Ally Hunter	4 October 1949 (aged 22)	1	(Scotland) Kilmarnock
2	DF	Alex Forsyth	5 February 1952 (aged 20)	0	(Scotland) Partick Thistle
3	DF	John Hansen	3 February 1950 (aged 22)	1	(Scotland) Partick Thistle
4	DF	Eddie Colquhoun	29 March 1945 (aged 27)	5	(England) Sheffield United
5	MF	Asa Hartford	24 October 1950 (aged 21)	3	(England) West Bromwich Albion
6	DF	Martin Buchan	6 March 1949 (aged 23)	3	(England) Manchester United
7	MF	Billy Bremner	9 December 1942 (aged 29)	31	(England) Leeds United
8	FW	Denis Law	24 February 1940 (aged 32)	46	(England) Manchester United
9	FW	Willie Morgan	2 October 1944 (aged 27)	7	(England) Manchester United
10	FW	Lou Macari	4 June 1949 (aged 23)	2	(Scotland) Celtic
11	FW	Jimmy Bone	22 September 1949 (aged 22)	0	(Scotland) Partick Thistle
12	GK	Bobby Clark	26 September 1945 (aged 26)	13	(Scotland) Aberdeen
13	FW	Colin Stein	10 May 1947 (aged 25)	16	(Scotland) Rangers
14	MF	George Graham	30 November 1944 (aged 27)	3	(England) Arsenal
15	DF	Willie Donachie	5 October 1951 (aged 20)	3	(England) Manchester City
16	DF	Stanley Rankin	31 October 1948 (aged 23)	0	(Scotland) Morton
17	FW	Bobby Lennox	30 August 1943 (aged 28)	10	(Scotland) Celtic
18	MF	Doug Smith	18 November 1937 (aged 34)	0	(Scotland) Dundee United
19	FW	Davie Wilson	10 July 1937 (aged 34)	22	(Scotland) Dumbarton
20	GK	John Fallon	16 August 1940 (aged 31)	0	(Scotland) Motherwell
21	FW	Kenny Cameron	2 July 1943 (aged 28)	0	(Scotland) Dundee United
22	MF	Jim Townsend	2 February 1945 (aged 27)	4	(Scotland) Heart of Midlothian
23	MF	Bobby Murdoch	17 August 1944 (aged 27)	12	(Scotland) Celtic
24	FW	John Hughes	3 April 1943 (aged 29)	8	(England) Crystal Palace
25	DF	Ronnie McKinnon	20 August 1940 (aged 31)	28	(Scotland) Rangers
26	DF	Kenny Davidson	14 February 1952 (aged 20)	0	(Scotland) Hibernian
27	FW	Morris Stevenson	16 April 1943 (aged 29)	0	(Scotland) Dundee United
28	MF	Bertie Auld	23 April 1938 (aged 34)	3	(Scotland) Hibernian F.C.

== Soviet Union ==
Head coach: (Soviet Union) Aleksandr Ponomarev

No.	Pos.	Player	Date of birth (age)	Caps	Goals	Club
1	GK	Aleksandr Tkachenko	24 January 1947 (aged 25)			(Football Federation of the Soviet Union) Zarya Voroshilovgrad
2	DF	Sergey Kuznetsov	30 November 1950 (aged 21)			(Football Federation of the Soviet Union) Zarya Voroshilovgrad
3	DF	Vladimir Malygin	1 November 1949 (aged 22)			(Football Federation of the Soviet Union) Zarya Voroshilovgrad
4	DF	Nikolay Pinchuk	25 July 1946 (aged 25)			(Football Federation of the Soviet Union) Zarya Voroshilovgrad
5	DF	Alexandr Zhuravlyov	1 September 1945 (aged 26)			(Football Federation of the Soviet Union) Zarya Voroshilovgrad
6	DF	Yuri Vasenin	2 October 1948 (aged 23)			(Football Federation of the Soviet Union) Zarya Voroshilovgrad
7	MF	Viktor Kuznetsov	25 February 1949 (aged 23)			(Football Federation of the Soviet Union) Zarya Voroshilovgrad
8	FW	Vyacheslav Semyonov	18 August 1947 (aged 24)			(Football Federation of the Soviet Union) Zarya Voroshilovgrad
9	FW	Yuriy Yeliseyev	26 September 1949 (aged 22)			(Football Federation of the Soviet Union) Zarya Voroshilovgrad
10	MF	Valeri Kopiy	20 February 1948 (aged 24)			(Football Federation of the Soviet Union) Zarya Voroshilovgrad
11	FW	Vladimir Onishchenko	28 October 1949 (aged 22)			(Football Federation of the Soviet Union) Zarya Voroshilovgrad
12	GK	Mikhail Forkash	28 January 1948 (aged 24)			(Football Federation of the Soviet Union) Zarya Voroshilovgrad
13	MF	Sergey Morozov	30 April 1950 (aged 22)			(Football Federation of the Soviet Union) Zarya Voroshilovgrad
14	DF	Evgeny Lovchev	29 January 1949 (aged 23)			(Football Federation of the Soviet Union) Spartak Moscow
15	FW	Anatoliy Byshovets	23 April 1946 (aged 26)			(Football Federation of the Soviet Union) Dynamo Kyiv
16	DF	Yuri Vasenin	2 October 1948 (aged 23)			(Football Federation of the Soviet Union) Zarya Voroshilovgrad
17	FW	Sergei Olshansky	28 May 1948 (aged 24)			(Football Federation of the Soviet Union) Spartak Moscow
18	MF	Aleksandr Zhuravlyov	1 September 1945 (aged 26)			(Football Federation of the Soviet Union) Zarya Voroshilovgrad
19	DF	Yuri Vasenin	2 October 1948 (aged 23)			(Football Federation of the Soviet Union) Zarya Voroshilovgrad
21	GK	Yevhen Rudakov	2 January 1944 (aged 28)			(Football Federation of the Soviet Union) Dynamo Kyiv
20	MF	Anatoliy Kuksov	21 November 1949 (aged 22)			(Football Federation of the Soviet Union) Zarya Voroshilovgrad
22	MF	Kakhi Asatiani	1 January 1947 (aged 25)			(Football Federation of the Soviet Union) Dinamo Tbilisi
23	DF	Valentin Afonin	22 December 1939 (aged 32)			(Football Federation of the Soviet Union) Zarya Voroshilovgrad
24	MF	Oleg Dolmatov	29 November 1948 (aged 23)			(Football Federation of the Soviet Union) Dynamo Moscow
25	FW	Mikhail Gershkovich	1 April 1947 (aged 25)			(Football Federation of the Soviet Union) Dynamo Moscow
26	DF	Volodymyr Kaplychnyi	26 February 1944 (aged 28)			(Football Federation of the Soviet Union) CSKA Moscow
27	MF	Nikolai Dolgov	9 December 1946 (aged 25)			(Football Federation of the Soviet Union) CSKA Moscow
28	FW	Levon Ishtoyan	3 September 1947 (aged 24)			(Football Federation of the Soviet Union) Ararat Yerevan

== Uruguay ==
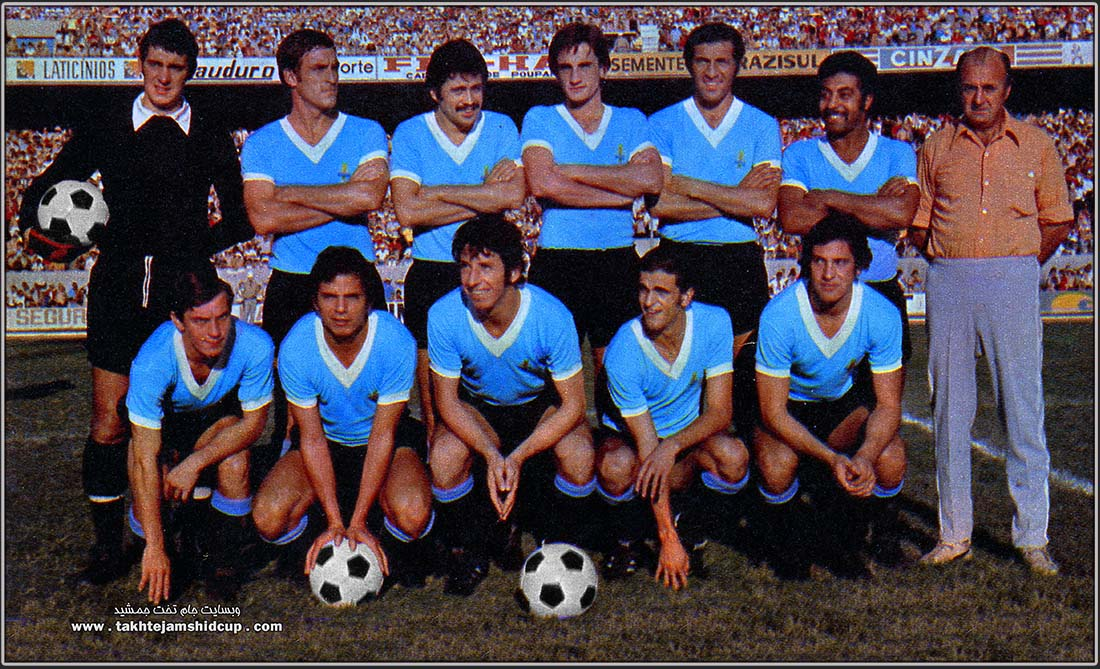
The Uruguay squad for the Brazil Independence Squad.

Head coach: Washington Etchamendi

No.	Pos.	Player	Date of birth (age)	Caps	Club
1	GK	Alberto Carrasco	22 September 1945 (aged 26)		(Uruguay) Sud América
2	DF	Baudilio Jáuregui	9 September 1945 (aged 26)		(Argentina) River Plate
3	DF	Juan Masnik	2 March 1943 (aged 29)		(Uruguay) Nacional
4	DF	Juan Carlos Blanco	25 February 1946 (aged 26)		(Uruguay) Nacional
5	MF	Julio Montero Castillo	25 April 1944 (aged 28)		(Uruguay) Nacional
6	DF	Luis Ubiña	7 June 1940 (aged 32)		(Uruguay) Nacional
7	MF	Julio César Jiménez	27 August 1954 (aged 17)		(Uruguay) Peñarol
8	MF	Ildo Maneiro	4 August 1947 (aged 24)		(Uruguay) Nacional
9	FW	Luis Villalba	15 December 1947 (aged 24)		(Uruguay) Peñarol
10	MF	Víctor Espárrago	6 October 1944 (aged 27)		(Uruguay) Nacional
11	MF	Francisco Bertocchi	5 August 1946 (aged 25)		(Uruguay) Liverpool
12	GK	Luis Aguerre	27 September 1946 (aged 25)		(Uruguay) Huracán Buceo
13	DF	Mario González	27 September 1950 (aged 21)		(Uruguay) Peñarol
14	MF	Pierino Lattuada	16 April 1950 (aged 22)		(Uruguay) Liverpool
15	FW	Rubén Corbo	20 January 1952 (aged 20)		(Uruguay) Peñarol
16	DF	Ricardo Pavoni	8 July 1943 (aged 28)		(Argentina) Independiente
17	DF	Juan Pedro Ascery	16 October 1950 (aged 21)		(Uruguay) Danubio
18	FW	Fernando Morena	2 February 1952 (aged 20)		(Uruguay) River Plate
19	DF	Francisco Campo	8 June 1951 (aged 21)		(Uruguay) Liverpool
20	MF	Luis Montero	18 March 1948 (aged 24)		(Uruguay) Bella Vista
21	DF	Agapito Rivero	24 March 1945 (aged 27)		(Uruguay) Liverpool
22	GK	Lorenzo Carrabs	15 October 1954 (aged 17)		(Uruguay) Danubio
23	MF	Alberto Cardaccio	26 August 1949 (aged 22)		(Uruguay) Danubio
24	DF	Miguel de Britos	1 June 1938 (aged 34)		(Uruguay) Huracán Buceo
25	FW	Carlos Jurado	11 June 1947 (aged 25)		(Spain) Betis
26	MF	Luis Montero	18 March 1948 (aged 24)		(Uruguay) Bella Vista
27	DF	Carlos Martínez	30 September 1940 (aged 31)		(Uruguay) Rampla Juniors
28	MF	Roberto Repetto	26 July 1945 (aged 26)		(Brazil) Cruzeiro

== Venezuela ==
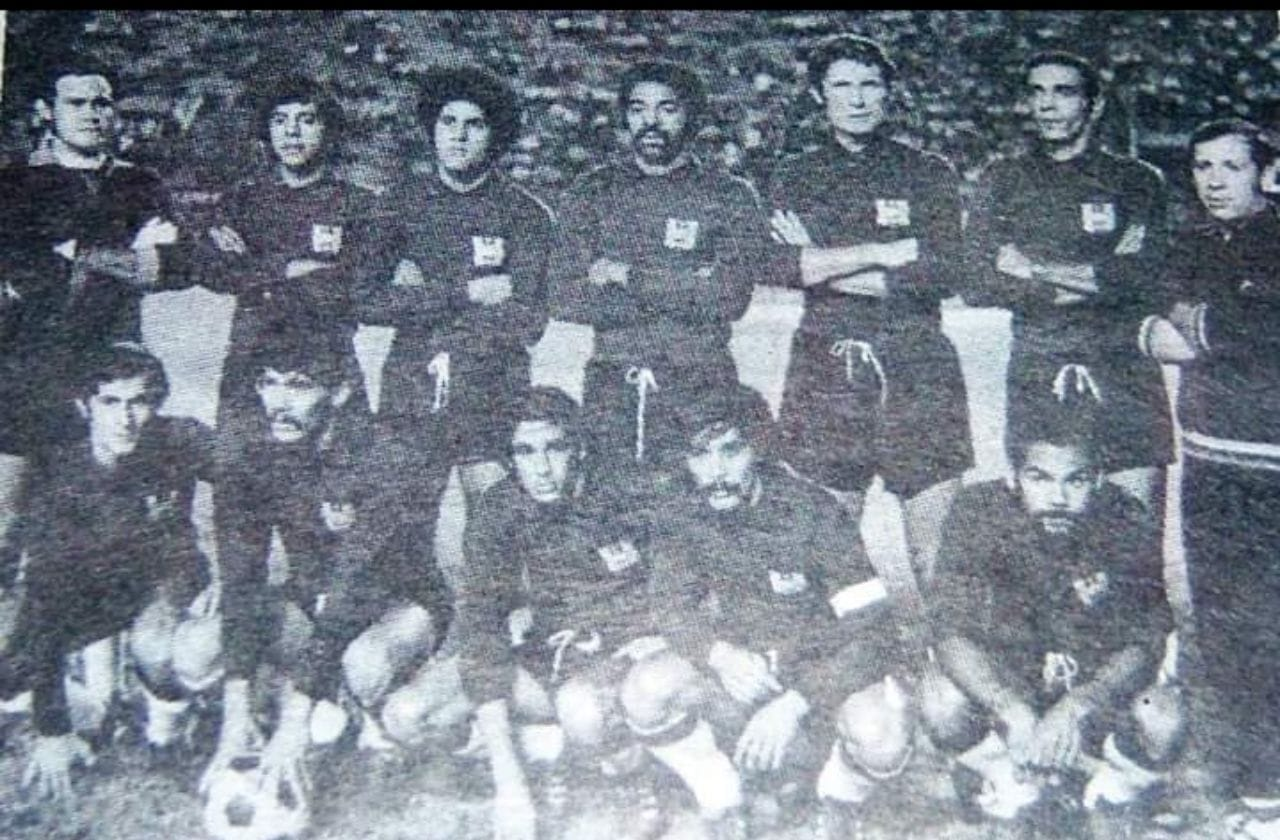
The Venezuela squad for the Brazil Independence Cup

Head coach: (Argentina) Gregorio Gómez

No.	Pos.	Player	Date of birth (age)	Caps	Club
1	GK	Vito Fassano	11 February 1940 (aged 32)		(Venezuela) Deportivo Italia
2	DF	Raúl Stanich	12 November 1952 (aged 19)		(Venezuela) Valencia CF
3	DF	Orlando Torres	18 July 1946 (aged 25)		(Venezuela) Deportivo Italia
4	DF	Asdrúbal Olivares	11 February 1953 (aged 19)		(Venezuela) Centro Italo Venezolano
5	MF	Luis Mendoza	21 June 1945 (aged 26)		(Venezuela) Estudiantes de Mérida
6	DF	Vicente Arruda	27 August 1941 (aged 30)		(Venezuela) Deportivo Italia
7	MF	Carlos Enrique Marín	2 June 1950 (aged 22)		(Venezuela) Deportivo Italia
8	FW	Reinaldo Rengel	12 October 1951 (aged 20)		(Venezuela) Deportivo Italia
9	FW	Francisco Rodríguez	30 September 1945 (aged 26)		(Venezuela) Deportivo Anzoategui
10	MF	Ramón Alfredo Iriarte	12 January 1948 (aged 24)		(Venezuela) Deportivo Galicia
11	MF	Lorenzo Delman Useche	21 June 1950 (aged 21)		(Venezuela) Deportivo Italia
12	GK	Omar Colmenares	18 April 1947 (aged 25)		(Venezuela) Valencia
13	FW	Mario Mateo			(Venezuela) Deportivo Italia
14	MF	Héctor Rodríguez	12 February 1945 (aged 27)		(Venezuela) La Salle
15	MF	Ricardo Pérez Carbonell	12 January 1950 (aged 22)		(Venezuela) Deportivo Galicia
16	MF	Richard Páez	31 December 1952 (aged 19)		(Venezuela) Estudiantes de Mérida
17	DF	Rubén Darío Torres	26 October 1945 (aged 26)		(Venezuela) Deportivo Anzoategui
18	MF	Joao Carlos De Souza	24 June 1945 (aged 26)		(Venezuela) Deportivo Italia
19	DF	Luis Marquina Pérez	12 November 1952 (aged 19)		(Venezuela) Portuguesa
20	FW	José Ravelo	8 February 1944 (aged 28)		(Spain) Xerez
21	GK	Eddy García	3 February 1944 (aged 28)		(Venezuela) Deportivo Galicia
22	DF	Humberto Tenias	20 April 1944 (aged 28)		(Venezuela) Valencia
23	FW	Nabor Fuenmayor	25 March 1942 (aged 30)		(Venezuela) Valencia
24	MF	Ramón Echenausi	25 October 1945 (aged 26)		(Venezuela) Portuguesa
25	FW	José Chiazzaro	26 July 1948 (aged 23)		(Venezuela) Estudiantes de Mérida
26	MF	Víctor Filomeno	2 October 1948 (aged 23)		(Venezuela) Deportivo Galicia
27	MF	Sheldon Useche	1 September 1951 (aged 20)		(Venezuela) Deportivo Italia
28	MF	Reinaldo Lovizzutto	10 February 1944 (aged 28)		(Venezuela) Valencia

== Yugoslavia ==
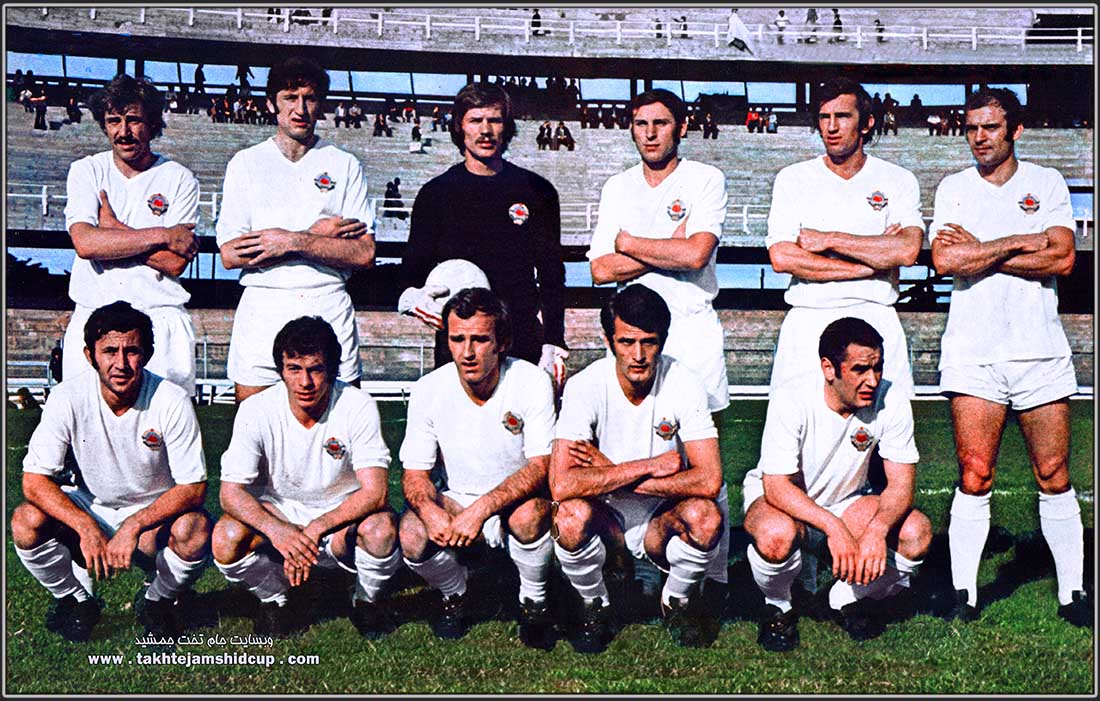
The Yugoslavia squad for the Brazil Independence Cup.

Head coach: Vujadin Boškov

No.	Pos.	Player	Date of birth (age)	Caps	Goals	Club
1	GK	Enver Marić	16 April 1948 (aged 24)			(Football Association of Yugoslavia) Velež Mostar
2	DF	Jusuf Hatunić	17 October 1950 (aged 21)			(Football Association of Yugoslavia) Sloboda Tuzla
3	DF	Petar Krivokuća	12 June 1947 (aged 24)			(Football Association of Yugoslavia) Red Star Belgrade
4	DF	Blagoje Bratić	1 March 1946 (aged 26)			(Football Association of Yugoslavia) Željezničar
5	DF	Miroslav Pavlović	23 October 1942 (aged 29)			(Football Association of Yugoslavia) Red Star Belgrade
6	DF	Miroslav Bošković	3 January 1947 (aged 25)			(Football Association of Yugoslavia) Hajduk Split
7	FW	Danilo Popivoda	1 May 1947 (aged 25)			(Football Association of Yugoslavia) Olimpija Ljubljana
8	MF	Branko Oblak	27 May 1947 (aged 25)			(Football Association of Yugoslavia) Olimpija Ljubljana
9	FW	Dragan Džajić	30 May 1946 (aged 26)			(Football Association of Yugoslavia) Red Star Belgrade
10	MF	Jovan Aćimović	21 June 1948 (aged 23)			(Football Association of Yugoslavia) Red Star Belgrade
11	FW	Dušan Bajević	10 December 1948 (aged 23)			(Football Association of Yugoslavia) Velež Mostar
12	GK	Rizah Mešković	10 August 1947 (aged 24)			(Football Association of Yugoslavia) Sloboda Tuzla
13	FW	Slobodan Santrač	1 July 1946 (aged 25)			(Football Association of Yugoslavia) OFK Beograd
14	MF	Jurica Jerković	25 February 1950 (aged 22)			(Football Association of Yugoslavia) Hajduk Split
15	DF	Dragoslav Stepanović	30 August 1948 (aged 23)			(Football Association of Yugoslavia) OFK Beograd
16	FW	Ilija Petković	22 September 1945 (aged 26)			(Football Association of Yugoslavia) OFK Beograd
17	FW	Nenad Bjeković	5 November 1947 (aged 24)			(Football Association of Yugoslavia) Partizan
18	DF	Josip Katalinski	2 May 1948 (aged 24)			(Football Association of Yugoslavia) Željezničar
19	FW	Josip Bukal	15 November 1945 (aged 26)			(Football Association of Yugoslavia) Željezničar
20	DF	Blagoje Paunović	4 June 1947 (aged 25)			(Football Association of Yugoslavia) Partizan
21	GK	Ratomir Dujković	24 February 1946 (aged 26)			(Football Association of Yugoslavia) Red Star Belgrade
22	MF	Franjo Vladić	19 October 1951 (aged 20)			(Football Association of Yugoslavia) Velež Mostar
23	DF	Miroslav Vardić	4 June 1947 (aged 25)			(Football Association of Yugoslavia) Borovo
24	FW	Petar Nikezić	3 April 1950 (aged 22)			(Football Association of Yugoslavia) Vojvodina
25	MF	Petar Baralić	3 October 1951 (aged 20)			(Football Association of Yugoslavia) Borac Čačak
26	DF	Miralem Fazlić	10 June 1947 (aged 25)			(Football Association of Yugoslavia) Sloboda Tuzla
27	MF	Edin Sprečo	19 December 1947 (aged 24)			(Football Association of Yugoslavia) Željezničar
28	FW	Tomislav Pešić	8 September 1949 (aged 22)			(Football Association of Yugoslavia) Radnički Niš
