= 1969 Liga Deportiva Universitaria de Quito season =

L.D.U. Quito
1969 season
- President: Telmo Ponce
- Manager: José Gómez Nogueira
- Stadium: Estadio Olímpico Atahualpa
- Serie A: Champions (1st title)
- Top goalscorer: Francisco Bertocchi (26 goals)
Home colours	Away colours

Liga Deportiva Universitaria de Quito's 1969 season was the in Quito-based club's 39th year of existence, the 16th year in professional football, and the 10th in the top level of professional football in Ecuador.

== Squad ==
No.	Pos.	Nation	Player
1	GK	URU	Yamandú Solimando
2	DF	ECU	César Muñoz
3	DF	ECU	Eduardo Zambrano (captain)
4	DF	ECU	Ramiro Tobar
5	MF	ARG	Santiago Alé
6	DF	ECU	Enrique Portilla
7	FW	ECU	Miguel Salazar
8	FW	URU	Carlos Ríos
9	FW	ECU	Marco Moreno
10	FW	URU	Francisco Bertocchi
11	FW	ECU	Armando Larrea

No.	Pos.	Nation	Player
13	DF	ECU	Iván Noboa
14	DF	ECU	Hugo Cabrera
17	DF	ECU	Washington Guevara
18	MF	ECU	Jorge Tapia
19	MF	ECU	Augusto González
21	MF	ECU	Milton Pazmiño
22	GK	ECU	César Mantilla
23	FW	ECU	Patricio Pintado
26	MF	ECU	Roberto Sussman
29	MF	ENG	Richard Poole

== Competitions ==
=== Serie A ===
==== Aggregate table ====
Pos	Team	Pld	W	D	L	GF	GA	GD	Pts	Qualification or relegation
1	LDU Quito (C, Q)	26	19	4	3	75	20	+55	42	Qualified for the 1970 Copa Libertadores
2	América de Quito (Q)	26	15	7	4	39	18	+21	37	Qualified for the 1970 Copa Libertadores
3	Aucas	26	16	4	6	50	27	+23	36	
4	Barcelona	26	14	5	7	35	20	+15	33	
5	El Nacional	26	13	6	7	56	36	+20	32	

Source: RSSSF - 1969 Serie A
(C) Champions; (Q) Qualified for the phase indicated

May 4 Round 1	Patria	0–1	LDU Quito	Guayaquil
			Larrea	Stadium: Estadio Modelo

May 11 Round 2	Deportivo Quito	2–1	LDU Quito	Quito
			Bertocchi	Stadium: Estadio Olímpico Atahualpa

May 17 Round 3	LDU Quito	1–0	América de Quito	Quito
	Tapia			Stadium: Estadio Olímpico Atahualpa

May 23 Round 4	Emelec	3–2	LDU Quito	Guayaquil
			Larrea	Stadium: Estadio George Capwell

May 31 Round 5	LDU Quito	1–0	Universidad Católica	Quito
	Larrea			Stadium: Estadio Olímpico Atahualpa

June 8 Round 6	LDU Quito	2–0	América de Ambato	Quito
	Guevara; Larrea			Stadium: Estadio Olímpico Atahualpa

June 14 Round 7	INECEL	1–5	LDU Quito	Manta
			Pintado; Bertocchi; Moreno	Stadium: Estadio Modelo

August 10 Round 8	Barcelona	3–1	LDU Quito	Guayaquil
			Ríos	Stadium: Estadio Modelo

August 17 Round 9	Manta Sport	0–3	LDU Quito	Manta
			Bertocchi; Salazar	Stadium: Estadio Modelo

August 24 Round 10	LDU Quito	2–0	Norte América	Quito
	Tapia; Ríos			Stadium: Estadio Olímpico Atahualpa

August 31 Round 11	LDU Quito	3–2	Aucas	Quito
	Ríos; Moreno			Stadium: Estadio Olímpico Atahualpa

September 5 Round 12	Everest	0–0	LDU Quito	Guayaquil
				Stadium: Estadio Modelo

September 14 Round 13	El Nacional	1–1	LDU Quito	Quito
			Bertocchi	Stadium: Estadio Olímpico Atahualpa

September 21 Round 14	LDU Quito	7–0	Patria	Quito
	Bertocchi; Alé; Ríos; Moreno; Larrea			Stadium: Estadio Olímpico Atahualpa

September 28 Round 15	LDU Quito	1–1	Deportivo Quito	Quito
	Alé			Stadium: Estadio Olímpico Atahualpa

October 5 Round 16	América de Quito	1–1	LDU Quito	Quito
			Tapia	Stadium: Estadio Olímpico Atahualpa

October 11 Round 17	LDU Quito	1–0	Emelec	Quito
	Bertocchi			Stadium: Estadio Olímpico Atahualpa

October 18 Round 18	Universidad Católica	1–6	LDU Quito	Quito
			Ríos; Bertocchi; Larrea; Alé	Stadium: Estadio Olímpico Atahualpa

October 26 Round 19	América de Ambato	0–11	LDU Quito	Ambato
			Larrea; Ríos; Bertocchi; Moreno	Stadium: Estadio Bellavista

November 1 Round 20	LDU Quito	7–1	INECEL	Quito
	Bertocchi; Moreno; Ríos; Tapia; Alé; Sussman			Stadium: Estadio Olímpico Atahualpa

November 9 Round 21	LDU Quito	3–0	Barcelona	Quito
	Tapia			Stadium: Estadio Olímpico Atahualpa

November 16 Round 22	LDU Quito	2–0	Manta Sport	Quito
	Tapia; Bertocchi			Stadium: Estadio Olímpico Atahualpa

November 23 Round 23	Norte América	1–5	LDU Quito	Guayaquil
			Bertocchi 9', 31'; Tapia 65'; Ríos 81', 90'	Stadium: Estadio Modelo; Attendance: 6,133; Referee: Armando Fisher

November 30 Round 24	Aucas	1–2	LDU Quito	Quito
			Moreno 5'; Ríos 14'	Stadium: Estadio Olímpico Atahualpa; Attendance: 40,001; Referee: Henry Agudelo

December 7 Round 25	LDU Quito	3–1	Everest	Quito
	Moreno 40'; Bertocchi 77'; Ríos 89'			Stadium: Estadio Olímpico Atahualpa; Attendance: 10,378; Referee: Ramiro Torres

December 14 Round 26	LDU Quito	3–1	El Nacional	Quito
	Bertocchi 56'; Tapia 74'; Larrea 88'			Stadium: Estadio Olímpico Atahualpa; Attendance: 10,211; Referee: Edgar Alprecht

== Player statistics ==
Num	Pos	Player	App	Goal	Yellow card	Red card
Num	Pos	Player	Serie A			
1	GF	Yamandú Solimando	22	—	—	—
2	DF	César Muñoz	20	—	—	—
3	DF	Eduardo Zambrano	23	—	—	—
4	DF	Ramiro Tobar	19	—	—	1
5	MF	Santiago Alé	23	4	—	—
6	DF	Enrique Portilla	9	—	—	—
7	FW	Miguel Salazar	14	1	—	—
8	FW	Carlos Ríos	23	14	—	—
9	FW	Marco Moreno	19	7	—	—
10	FW	Francisco Bertocchi	26	26	—	1
11	FW	Armando Larrea	21	9	—	—
13	DF	Iván Noboa	26	—	—	—
14	DF	Hugo Cabrera	9	—	—	—
17	DF	Washington Guevara	8	1	—	—
18	MF	Jorge Tapia	24	10	—	—
19	MF	Augusto González	2	—	—	—
21	MF	Milton Pazmiño	3	—	—	—
22	GK	César Mantilla	4	—	—	—
23	FW	Patricio Pintado	2	2	—	—
26	MF	Roberto Sussman	5	1	—	—
29	MF	Richard Poole	1	—	—	—
Totals			—	75	0	2
