= 1971 Asian Champion Club Tournament =

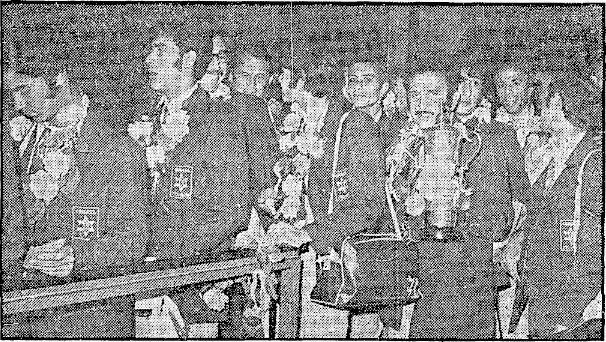
- Maccabi Tel Aviv players with the trophy

Tournament details
- Host country: Thailand
- Dates: 21 March – 2 April 1971
- Teams: 8
- Venue: 1 (in 1 host city)

Final positions
- Champions: (Israel) Maccabi Tel Aviv (2nd title)
- Runners-up: (Iraq) Aliyat Al-Shorta
- Third place: (Iran) Taj Tehran
- Fourth place: (South Korea) ROK Army

Tournament statistics
- Top scorer(s): Sabah Hatem; Shlomo Gerbi; Ali Al-Mulla (4 goals each)
- Best goalkeeper: Sattar Khalaf

The 1971 Asian Champion Club Tournament was the fourth edition of the annual Asian club football competition hosted by Asian Football Confederation. Initially, nine clubs from nine countries competed in the tournament, but Jardine Hong Kong withdrew before the draw, leaving eight clubs to compete. The tournament was held in Bangkok, Thailand from 21 March to 2 April: the tournament was originally scheduled to be held in Kuwait, but the AFC moved the tournament as Kuwaiti immigration laws would have seen the delegation of Israeli club Maccabi Tel Aviv refused entry into the country.

The eight clubs were split into two groups of four based on the results of a preliminary round, with the group winners and the runners-up advancing to the semifinals.

The final was scratched and Maccabi Tel Aviv were awarded their second Asian title after Iraqi club Aliyat Al-Shorta refused to play them out of solidarity with Palestine. The AFC and the Thai FA subsequently arranged a match between Maccabi and a Combined Bangkok team that was played in lieu of the final.

== Participants ==
Participants
Team	Qualifying method
(India) Punjab	1970–71 Santosh Trophy champions
(Iran) Taj Tehran	1970–71 Local League champions
(Iraq) Aliyat Al-Shorta	1969–70 Iraq Central FA Premier League champions
(Israel) Maccabi Tel Aviv	1969–70 Liga Leumit champions
(Kuwait) Al-Arabi	1969–70 Kuwaiti Premier League champions
(Malaysia) Perak FA	1970 Malaysia Cup champions
(South Korea) ROK Army	1970 Korean National Football Championship champions
(Thailand) Bangkok Bank	Selected by Football Association of Thailand

=== Withdrawals ===
- Jardine Hong Kong - 1969–70 Hong Kong First Division League champions

== Teams location ==
Location of the 1971 Asian Champion Club Tournament teams
Red: Group A; Blue: Group B

== Preliminary round ==
These were the group allocation matches: each group consisted of two winners and two losers from this round.

Following the original draw, Aliyat Al-Shorta refused to play their scheduled opponent Maccabi Tel Aviv: subsequently, a second draw was conducted.

21 March 1971

Bangkok Bank (Thailand)	1–2	(South Korea) ROK Army
Muankasem 79'		Kim Chong-ho 23'; Choi Sang-chul 32'

Supachalasai Stadium, Bangkok
Attendance: 8,000
21 March 1971

Aliyat Al-Shorta (Iraq)	3–2	(Iran) Taj Tehran
Abdul-Hameed 2'; Ismail 35', 65'		Mazloumi 23', 81'

Supachalasai Stadium, Bangkok

22 March 1971

Al-Arabi (Kuwait)	8–1	(India) Punjab
Shehata 13', 50'; Fahad 28'; Al-Mulla 31', 36', 61', 68'; Basry 63'		Surjeet Singh 17'

Supachalasai Stadium, Bangkok
Attendance: 3,000
22 March 1971

Maccabi Tel Aviv (Israel)	1–0	(Malaysia) Perak FA
Nimni 20'

Supachalasai Stadium, Bangkok

== Group stage ==
=== Group A ===
Pos	Team	Pld	W	D	L	GF	GA	GD	Pts	Qualification
1	(Iran) Taj	3	2	1	0	5	1	+4	5	Advance to knockout stage
2	(South Korea) ROK Army	3	1	2	0	5	2	+3	4	Advance to knockout stage
3	(Kuwait) Al-Arabi	3	1	1	1	3	1	+2	3	
4	(Malaysia) Perak FA	3	0	0	3	0	9	−9	0	

24 March 1971

Al-Arabi (Kuwait)	3–0	(Malaysia) Perak FA
Fahad 17'; Shehata 66'; Basry 73'

Supachalasai Stadium, Bangkok
Attendance: 10,000
24 March 1971

Taj Tehran (Iran)	2–1	(South Korea) ROK Army
Hajghasem 43', 67'		Lim Tae-joo 46'

Supachalasai Stadium, Bangkok

26 March 1971

ROK Army (South Korea)	3–0	(Malaysia) Perak FA
Choi Sang-chul 19'; Park Yi-chun 56'; Chung Kyu-poong 78'

Supachalasai Stadium, Bangkok
Attendance: 9,000
26 March 1971

Taj Tehran (Iran)	0–0	(Kuwait) Al-Arabi

Supachalasai Stadium, Bangkok

28 March 1971

Taj Tehran (Iran)	3–0	(Malaysia) Perak FA
Mojdehi 58'; Lavasani 62'; Wong Hee Kok 66' (o.g.)

Supachalasai Stadium, Bangkok
Attendance: 8,000
28 March 1971

ROK Army (South Korea)	1–0	(Kuwait) Al-Arabi
Park Yi-chun 73'

Supachalasai Stadium, Bangkok

=== Group B ===
Pos	Team	Pld	W	D	L	GF	GA	GD	Pts	Qualification
1	(Israel) Maccabi Tel Aviv	3	3	0	0	11	2	+9	6	Advance to knockout stage
2	(Iraq) Aliyat Al-Shorta	3	2	0	1	8	4	+4	4	Advance to knockout stage
3	(Thailand) Bangkok Bank	3	1	0	2	3	6	−3	2	
4	(India) Punjab	3	0	0	3	2	12	−10	0	

25 March 1971

Bangkok Bank (Thailand)	2–0	(India) Punjab
Pisetsamrascheep 5'; Daencharoenvanakit 7'

Supachalasai Stadium, Bangkok
Attendance: 8,000
25 March 1971

Maccabi Tel Aviv (Israel)	3–0 ^{1}	(Iraq) Aliyat Al-Shorta

Supachalasai Stadium, Bangkok

27 March 1971

Maccabi Tel Aviv (Israel)	4–1	(India) Punjab
Nimni 10'; Gerbi 16'; Spiegel 39'; Bar-Nur 71'		Surjeet Singh 83' (pen.)

Supachalasai Stadium, Bangkok
Attendance: 9,000
27 March 1971

Bangkok Bank (Thailand)	0–2	(Iraq) Aliyat Al-Shorta
		Abdul-Hameed 75'; Hatem 82'

Supachalasai Stadium, Bangkok

29 March 1971

Aliyat Al-Shorta (Iraq)	6–1	(India) Punjab
Hatem 23', 53', 62'; Nouri 50', 87'; Kumar 64' (o.g.)		Sukhwinder Singh 78'

Supachalasai Stadium, Bangkok
29 March 1971

Bangkok Bank (Thailand)	1–4	(Israel) Maccabi Tel Aviv
Suvanthada 65'		Gerbi 10'; Bar-Nur 20', 29'; Spiegel 32'

Supachalasai Stadium, Bangkok

^{1} Aliyat Al-Shorta refused to play for political reasons: the match was awarded to Maccabi 3–0.

== Knockout stage ==
=== Semi-finals ===
31 March 1971

Maccabi Tel Aviv (Israel)	2–0	(South Korea) ROK Army
Gerbi 29', 63'

Supachalasai Stadium, Bangkok

31 March 1971

Aliyat Al-Shorta (Iraq)	2–0	(Iran) Taj Tehran
Hussein 6'; Ismail 81'

Supachalasai Stadium, Bangkok
Attendance: 12,000

=== Third-place match ===
2 April 1971

Taj Tehran (Iran)	3–2	(South Korea) ROK Army
Hajghasem 19'; Mazloumi 57'; Jabbari 80'		Chung Kyu-poong 63'; Lim Tae-joo 87'

Supachalasai Stadium, Bangkok
Attendance: 3,000

=== Final ===
2 April 1971

Maccabi Tel Aviv (Israel)	w/o ^{1}	(Iraq) Aliyat Al-Shorta

Supachalasai Stadium, Bangkok

^{1} The final was scratched and Maccabi Tel Aviv were awarded the championship after Aliyat Al-Shorta refused to play for political reasons.

== Exhibition match ==
This match was arranged by the AFC and the Thai FA, and was played in lieu of the final.

2 April 1971

Combined Bangkok (Thailand)	1–2	(Israel) Maccabi Tel Aviv
Sondhikan 6'		Bar-Nur 2', 61'

Supachalasai Stadium, Bangkok
