= Ramón Cruz Colindres =

Honduran footballer (born 1946)

Personal information
- Full name: Carlos Ramón Cruz Colindres
- Date of birth: 3 May 1946 (age 80)
- Place of birth: San Pedro Sula, Cortés, Honduras
- Position: Midfielder

Senior career*
Years	Team	Apps	(Gls)
1964–1978	Real España		
1978–1980	Portuario		(1)
1980–1982	Platense		

International career
1972	CONCACAF	3	(0)
- * Club domestic league appearances and goals

Carlos Ramón Cruz Colindres (born 3 May 1946) is a Honduran footballer. He played for Real España, Portuario and Platense throughout the 1970s and the early 1980s. He is more known for his participation in the Brazil Independence Cup within the united CONCACAF team in 1972.

== Club career ==
Cruz spent the majority of his career with Real España throughout the majority of the 1970s. However, he then made the shift to play for Portuario and would achieve their victory in the 1978–79 Honduran Segunda División. He only spent a single season in the Liga Nacional, scoring a single goal before the club was relegated following the 1979–80 Honduran Liga Nacional. He spent the rest of his career with Platense until their relegation in the 1981–82 Honduran Liga Nacional and retired following the season's conclusion.

== International career ==
Whilst never making an international appearance for Honduras, he was selected by Honduran manager Carlos Padilla Velásquez to represent the Honduran composition of the united CONCACAF team that comprised mostly of Honduran and Haitian players, appearing in three matches throughout the tournament.
