= Manuel Uribe =

Manuel Uribe may refer to:

- Manuel Uribe Ángel (1822–1914), Colombian academic and physician, governor of Antioquia, first curator of the Museum of Antioquia
- Manuel Uribe Troncoso (1867–1959), Mexican ophthalmologist and founding member of the Colegio Nacional
- Manuel Uribe Barra (1895–1970), Chilean politician
- Manuel Uribe (footballer) (born 1948), Peruvian goalkeeper
- Manuel Uribe (obese man) (1965–2014), Mexican man, one of the heaviest people in medical history

== See also ==
- Manuel Oribe (1792–1857), Uruguayan politician
