= Dolgov =

Dolgov (masculine, Russian: Долгов) or Dolgova (feminine, Russian: Долгова) is a Russian surname. Notable people with the surname include:

- Aleksandr Dolgov (born 1998), Russian soccer player
- Alexander Dolgov (physicist) (born 1941), Russian cosmologist
- Anastasiia Dolgova (born 2000), Ukrainian–born Russian sprint canoeist
- Dmitri Dolgov, Russian–American engineer
- Dumitru Dolgov (born 1987), Ukrainian–Moldovan soccer player
- Irina Dolgova (born 1995), Russian judoka
- Konstantin Dolgov (born 1968), Russian politician
- Nikolai Dolgov (born 1946), Soviet soccer player and manager
- Pavel Dolgov (born 1996), Russian soccer player
- Pyotr Dolgov (1920–1962), Soviet colonel
- Sergei Dolgov (born 1954), Ukrainian journalist and editor
- Vladimir Dolgov (born 1960), Soviet backstroke swimmer
- Yevgeni Dolgov (born 1969), Soviet–Russian soccer player

== See also ==
- Dolgikh
