= Antoine Tassy =

Haitian footballer and manager (1924–1991)

Personal information
- Full name: Antoine Tassy
- Date of birth: 26 March 1924
- Place of birth: Haiti
- Date of death: 3 March 1991 (aged 66)
- Place of death: Haiti
- Position: Striker

Senior career*
Years	Team	Apps	(Gls)
1944–1959	Victory SC		

International career
1944–1959	Haiti		

Managerial career
- 1961: Haiti
- 1963: Racing Club Haïtien
- 1963: Jamaica
- 1965–1976: Haiti
- 1977: Violette AC
- 1980–1981: Haiti
- * Club domestic league appearances and goals

Antoine Tassy (26 March 1924 – 3 March 1991) was a Haitian football (soccer) player and manager. He was the manager of the Haiti national football team in the 1974 FIFA World Cup, their first World Cup appearance. In 1963, he was the manager of Jamaica. Earlier in 1963, he was the manager of Racing Club Haïtien, who were eventually declared winners of the 1963 CONCACAF Champions' Cup.

As a player, he represented Haiti in 1954 World Cup qualification, at the 1957 CCCF Championship and at the 1959 Pan American Games.

During Tassy's time as manager of Haiti, the national team was used as an instrument of propaganda by the Duvaliers. A friendly held at Downing Stadium, New York City in July 1973 between Haiti and Millonarios of Colombia was delayed for more than two hours and forty five minutes by Haitian exiles protesting against the regime. At one point, Tassy took his team to the dressing room and said that they were going home. He later made a call to Haitian Football Federation president Claude Raymond who told him to resume the match, if possible. Then, Serge Charles, a high ranking member of the Haitian delegation to the United Nations, arrived and made another call to Raymond, and the Haitians agreed to go back on the field. Police arrived and cordoned off the field.

Tassy was described in a February 1974 Observer article by Hugh McIlvanney as a "short, thickly built man" and as a "48 year-old Negro who is director of sport in Haiti and coach of the national team". The article stated that Tassy had both a year's study of the sport of football in Paris and "twenty years" as an inside left with Racing, "one of the most popular of the eight Port-au-Prince teams that form the highest level of the game in Haiti".

Looking forward to the World Cup first round match versus Italy later that year, Tassy was quoted as saying in the Observer piece that "we know the Italians will not play their usual game against us...they will not be as cautious as they normally are. They will come out to overwhelm us, regarding us as much the weakest of their opponents. We will try to defend carefully and hit them with counter-attacks".

Haiti shocked Italy in their opening match of the tournament by taking a lead in the 46th minute through Emmanuel Sanon from a quick counter attacking pass by Philippe Vorbe. However, Italy eventually won 3–1.

Tassy was also co-manager of the CONCACAF side at the 1972 Brazil Independence Cup with Carlos Padilla of Honduras.

He died on 3 March 1991.
