= Tomislav Pešić =

Serbian footballer (1949–2021)

Tomislav Pešić Томислав Пешић
Personal information
- Full name: Tomislav Pešić
- Date of birth: 8 September 1949
- Place of birth: Surdulica, Serbia, Yugoslavia
- Date of death: 8 February 2021 (aged 71)
- Place of death: Niš, Nišava, Serbia
- Position: Forward

Senior career*
| Years | Team | Apps | (Gls) |
| 1967–1978 | Radnički Niš | 289 | (44) |
| 1978 | Tulsa Roughnecks | 2 | (0) |
| 1979–1980 | Jastrebac Niš | | |

International career
| 1972 | Yugoslavia | | |
- * Club domestic league appearances and goals

Tomislav Pešić (Serbian Cyrillic: Томислав Пешић – Руна; 8 September 1949 – 8 February 2021) was a Serbian footballer. He primarily played for Radnički Niš throughout the majority of his career as well as the Tulsa Roughnecks in 1978. He was also part of the Yugoslav roster for the Brazil Independence Cup.

== Club career ==
Born in Surdulica, Pešić began his career with Radnički Niš for the 1967–68 Yugoslav First League and would spend his first three seasons as a striker of the club. He would find his only notable achievement through the 1975 Balkans Cup where the club would win their first international title. He would spend ten seasons playing for the club with his final season for the club being into the 1977–78 Yugoslav First League with 289 appearances and 44 goals. However, mid-season, he would catch the attention of Tulsa Roughnecks manager Bill Foulkes and would sign him for the 1978 season alongside fellow Yugoslav players Dušan Lukić, Milan Dovedan, Niki Nikolic, Radoslav Barišić, Petar Nikezić, Nino Zec, Živorad Stamenković and Vladimir Jašić. Despite the signing of many Yugoslav players for the season, none of them would survive into the following 1979 season as they wouldn't make a lasting impression with Pešić only making two appearances throughout the entire season. He spent his final season with Jastrebac Niš before his retirement.

== Personal life ==
Pešić died on 8 February 2021 following a long battle with illness with his funeral being held at the New Cemetery at Niš.
