= Dolgikh =

Dolgikh (Russian: Долгих, from долгий meaning 'long') is a gender-neutral Russian surname of Siberian origin. It may refer to

- Ivan Ilyich Dolgikh (1904–1961), Soviet NKVD officer
- Ivan Ivanovich Dolgikh (1896–1956), Soviet NKVD officer
- Ivan Dolgikh (judoka), Russian judoka
- Maria Dolgikh (born 1987), Russian table tennis player
- Vladimir Dolgikh (1924–2020), Russian politician
- Alina Dolgikh (born 1982), Russian handballer

== See also ==
- Dolgov
- Dolhyi
