= Meir Nimni =

Israeli footballer (1948–2017)

Meir Nimni מאיר נמני
Personal information
- Date of birth: 29 September 1948
- Place of birth: Derna, Libya
- Date of death: 25 June 2017 (aged 68)
- Position: Defender

Senior career*
Years	Team	Apps	(Gls)
1966–1968	Maccabi Ramla		
1968–1981	Maccabi Tel Aviv	368	(27)

International career
1974–1977	Israel	24	(0)

Managerial career
- 1987–1988: Hapoel Tzafririm Holon
- 1996: Hapoel Tzafririm Holon
- * Club domestic league appearances and goals

Meir Nimni (Hebrew: מאיר נמני; 29 September 1948 – 25 June 2017) was an Israeli footballer. He competed in the men's tournament at the 1976 Summer Olympics.
