= C.A. Portuario =

Atlético Portuario
- Full name: Club Atlético Portuario
- Ground: Estadio Excélsior; Puerto Cortés, Honduras
- Capacity: 7,910
Home colours	Away colours

Atlético Portuario was a Honduran football club based in Puerto Cortés, Honduras which played in the Liga Nacional in the 1979–80 season.

== Achievements ==
- Segunda División

Winners (1): 1978–79

== League performance ==
Regular season										Post season								
Season	Pos.	P	W	D	L	F	A	PTS	+/–	Pos.	P	W	D	L	F	A	PTS	+/-
1979–80	10th	27	6	7	14	29	55	19	–26	Didn't enter								

== All-time scorers ==
#	Player name	Goals
1	(Honduras) Carlos "Calín" Morales	6
2	(Honduras) Orlando "Choloma" Rodríguez	4
3	(Honduras) Ernesto Bravo	3
–	(Honduras) Edgardo Núñez	3
–	(Honduras) Óscar "Martillo" Hernández	3
–	(Costa Rica) Roscoe Charles	3
7	(Honduras) Pablo Orellana	2
–	(Honduras) Aníbal Bravo	2
9	(Costa Rica) Erick Cabalceta	1
–	(Honduras) Jorge "Camioncito" Duarte	1
–	(Honduras) Ramón Cruz Colindres	1
Total		29
