= Marco Moreno =

Spanish footballer (born 2001)

Personal information
- Full name: Marco Moreno Ojeda
- Date of birth: 31 July 2001 (age 25)
- Place of birth: Las Palmas, Spain
- Height: 1.91 m (6 ft 3 in)
- Position: Centre-back

Team information
- Current team: Bahia
- Number: 3

Youth career
- 2011–2016: Las Palmas
- 2016–2020: Atlético Madrid

Senior career*
Years	Team	Apps	(Gls)
2020–2024	Atlético Madrid B	98	(11)
2024–2025	Farense	25	(0)
2025–2026	Eibar	30	(0)
2026–	Bahia	0	(0)

International career^{‡}
2018	Spain U17	1	(0)
- * Club domestic league appearances and goals as of 6 June 2026 ‡ National team caps and goals as of 02:59, 15 September 2024 (UTC)

Marco Moreno Ojeda (born 31 July 2001) is a Spanish footballer currently playing as a centre-back for Campeonato Brasileiro Série A club Bahia.

== Club career ==
Born in Las Palmas, Canary Islands, Moreno is a youth product of hometown club UD Las Palmas, before moving to the youth academy of Atlético Madrid in 2016, aged 15. He worked his way up their youth categories, before moving to their reserves in 2020.

Moreno was called up to train with the senior team of Atleti in the 2021 pre-season, before signing a professional contract with the club until 2025 on 6 April 2022. Eventually becoming captain of the reserves, he ended up staying with Atlético Madrid's youth setup for eight years.

On 15 June 2024, Moreno transferred to Portuguese Primeira Liga club SC Farense on a three-year contract; Atlético retained a buy-back clause and 50% of sell-on fee. He made his professional debut on 11 August, starting in a 2–1 home loss to Moreirense FC.

On 8 July 2025, after suffering relegation, Moreno returned to his home country with SD Eibar in Segunda División, signing until 2027. Roughly one year later, after being regularly used, he agreed to a five-year contract with Campeonato Brasileiro Série A side Bahia.

== International career ==
Moreno is a youth international for Spain, having played up to the Spain U17s in February 2018.
