= Hugo Pena =

Argentinian footballer (1951–1981)

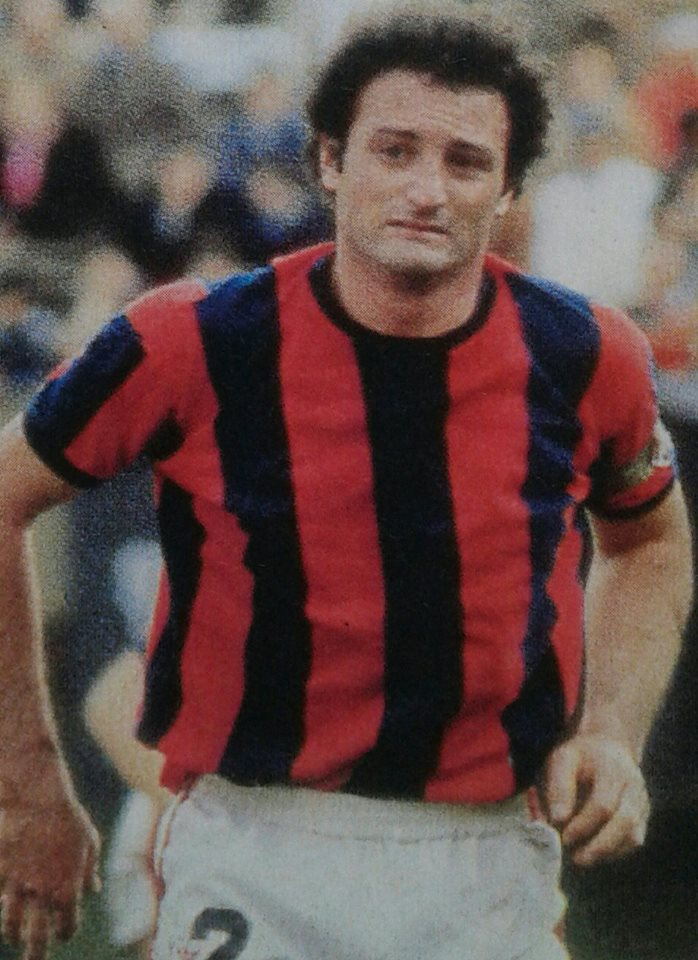
- Pena in 1980

Personal information
- Full name: Hugo Osvaldo Pena
- Date of birth: 28 November 1951
- Place of birth: Buenos Aires, Argentina
- Date of death: 9 January 1981 (aged 29)
- Place of death: Villa General Mitre, Buenos Aires, Argentina
- Position: Defender

Youth career
- 1962–1969: Argentinos Juniors

Senior career*
Years	Team	Apps	(Gls)
1970–1973	Argentinos Juniors		
1973–1976	River Plate	97	(0)
1977–1979	Chacarita Juniors		
1979–1981	San Lorenzo	61	(2)

International career
1972	Argentina	1	(0)
- * Club domestic league appearances and goals

Hugo Osvaldo Pena (28 November 1951 – 9 January 1981) was an Argentinian football player. Nicknamed "Tomate", he played for clubs such as River Plate and San Lorenzo, overseeing various titles for the two clubs. He also briefly represented his home country of Argentina as a youth international.

== Club career ==
Pena began his career by playing for Argentinos Juniors when he was still enrolled in middle school and played for the youth club. His debut for the Argentine Primera División was in the 1970 Campeonato Metropolitano against Lanús whilst studying engineering at the time. He represented the club professionally until around the 1973 season where he would then play for River Plate after a contractual dispute between River Plate and Boca Juniors, with the former agreeing to pay around $70,000 to play for Los Millonarios. Throughout his time with the club, he played in over 97 matches and was on the winning side for the 1975 Argentine Primera División in both the Campeonato Metropolitano and Nacional headed by Ángel Labruna. After being largely replaced by Daniel Passarella during the 1976 Argentine Primera División, Pena played for Chacarita Juniors beginning in the 1977 edition. Afterwards, he played for San Lorenzo in the 1979 Argentine Primera División following a club restructuring to favor players such as Pena with his debut being for the club on 2 September in a 6–1 victory against Chaco For Ever. Over the course of his career within El Ciclón, he scored two goals within 61 matches, one of which was scored against Tigre despite being injured in his legs, contributing to the 3–1 victory. His other goal for the club was against All Boys in a 1–1 on 27 July 1980.

His career abruptly ended on 9 January 1981 as on that day, while watching Tom and Jerry with his daughter Gabriela within his house in Villa General Mitre, he intended to change the channel while his right foot was submerged in a washstand. This resulted in Pena receiving a violent and fatal electrical shock, and he was pronounced dead upon arrival to the Hospital Vélez Sarsfield. In the following days, the club temporarily ceased operations to offer their condolences towards his passing. He is currently buried at La Chacarita Cemetery.

== International career ==
Pena made his only international appearance for Argentina on 31 August 1972 as he called up as part of a friendly against a united team of Argentinian youth clubs, which ended in a 3–1 victory.

== Personal life ==
Pena married Susana Mirta Herrera at the age of 29 and had three children with her: Sebastián. Gabriela and Laureano.
