= 1978–79 Honduran Segunda División =

Honduran Segunda División
- Season: 1978–79
- Champions: Portuario
- Promoted: Portuario
- All statistics correct as of 7 January 1979.

The 1978–79 Honduran Segunda División was the 12th season of the Honduran Segunda División. Under the management of Luis Maradiaga, C.A. Portuario won the tournament after defeating C.D. Federal in the final series and obtained promotion to the 1979–80 Honduran Liga Nacional.

== Final ==
1st leg	Federal	1–1	Portuario	Tegucigalpa, Francisco Morazán
				Stadium: Estadio Tiburcio Carías Andino

7 January 1979 2nd leg	Portuario	2–0	Federal	Puerto Cortés, Cortés
				Stadium: Estadio Excélsior

- Portuario won 3–1 on aggregate.
