= Silvio Quintero =

Colombian footballer (1950–2022)

Personal information
- Date of birth: 13 April 1950
- Date of death: 16 July 2022 (aged 72)
- Position: Goalkeeper

Senior career*
| Years | Team | Apps | (Gls) |
- Deportes Tolima
- * Club domestic league appearances and goals

Silvio Quintero (13 April 1950 – 16 July 2022) was a Colombian footballer who competed in the 1972 Summer Olympics.
