= Luis Pino =

Chilean footballer (1947–2016)

- Pino in 1969

Personal information
- Full name: Luis Osvaldo Pino Morales
- Date of birth: 25 October 1947
- Place of birth: Machalí, O'Higgins, Chile
- Date of death: 19 April 2016 (aged 68)
- Place of death: Rancagua, O'Higgins, Chile
- Position: Forward

Senior career*
Years	Team	Apps	(Gls)
1967–1972	O'Higgins		(60)
1973–1974	Unión Española		(4)
1975	O'Higgins		(4)

International career
1971–1972	Chile	3	(0)
- * Club domestic league appearances and goals

Luis Osvaldo Pino Morales (25 October 1947 – 19 April 2016) was a Chilean footballer. He played as a forward for O'Higgins and Unión Española throughout the late 1960s to mid 1970s, being part of the winning squad for the 1973 Primera División de Chile.

== Club career ==
In regards to how he played, Pino was characterized by having good balance, fast dribbling as well as possessing a natural feint. He would begin his career by playing for O'Higgins in 1967 as he would mark a new era for the club alongside players such as Héctor Contreras, Manuel Abarca, César Valdivia, Freddy León, Víctor Manuel Arias and Sergio and Fernando Pérez. He would be a major goal scorer for the club as he would be the second top goal scorer in the 1969 season. He would then sign for Unión Española for the 1973 Copa Libertadores as he would play in the group stage matches. He'd also be part of the winning squad for the 1973 Primera División de Chile and would continue to play for the 1974 season. He would return to O'Higgins in 1975 for his final season, scoring only four goals by the time of his retirement.

== International career ==
Pino would briefly represent his home country of Chile in three matches in 1971 and 1972 with two of those matches being for the 1971 Copa Juan Pinto Durán.
