= Francis Camerini =

French footballer (born 1948)

Personal information
- Date of birth: 25 January 1948 (age 78)
- Place of birth: Marseille, France
- Position: Defender

Senior career*
Years	Team	Apps	(Gls)
1964–1971	AS Saint-Étienne		
1971–1976	OGC Nice		

International career
1971	France	2	(0)
- * Club domestic league appearances and goals

Francis Camerini (born 25 January 1948) is a retired professional French association football defender.
