= Washington Guevara =

Ecuadorian footballer (born 1946)

Personal information
- Date of birth: 30 April 1946 (age 80)
- Position: Defender

International career
| Years | Team | Apps | (Gls) |
| 1975 | Ecuador | 1 | (0) |

Washington Guevara (born 30 April 1946) is an Ecuadorian footballer. He played in one match for the Ecuador national football team in 1975. He was also part of Ecuador's squad for the 1975 Copa América tournament.
