= Álvaro Calle =

Colombian footballer (born 1953)

Personal information
- Date of birth: 25 May 1953 (age 73)
- Position: Defender

Senior career*
Years	Team	Apps	(Gls)
- Independiente Medellín
- * Club domestic league appearances and goals

Álvaro Calle (born 25 May 1953) is a Colombian former footballer who competed in the 1972 Summer Olympics.
