= José Broissart =

French footballer (born 1947)

Personal information
- Date of birth: 20 February 1947 (age 79)
- Place of birth: Ravenel, France
- Position: Midfielder

Youth career
- 1959–1961: Ravenel
- 1961–1964: AS Beauvais

Senior career*
Years	Team	Apps	(Gls)
1964–1966	RC Paris	36	(8)
1966–1969	Sedan	81	(0)
1969–1973	Saint-Étienne	92	(3)
1973–1976	Bastia	81	(1)
1976–1980	Lyon	43	(5)
Total		333	(17)

International career
1969–1973	France	10	(0)
- * Club domestic league appearances and goals

José Broissart (born 20 February 1947) is a French former professional footballer played as a midfielder.
