= Valeri Kopiy =

Soviet footballer

Personal information
- Full name: Valeri Vasilyevich Kopiy
- Date of birth: 20 February 1948 (age 78)
- Place of birth: Pushkin, USSR
- Position: Midfielder

Senior career*
Years	Team	Apps	(Gls)
1967–1968	Neftyanik Fergana	31	(1)
1969	FC Pakhtakor Tashkent	0	(0)
1970–1971	Avtomobilist Zhytomyr	37	(7)
1972–1973	FC Zorya Luhansk	19	(1)
1974–1975	Dynamo Leningrad		
1975	Zenit Leningrad	7	(0)
1976–1977	Dynamo Leningrad		

International career
1972	Soviet Union	1	(0)
- * Club domestic league appearances and goals

Valeri Vasilyevich Kopiy (Russian: Валерий Васильевич Копий; born 20 February 1948) is a retired Soviet football player.

== Honours ==
- Soviet Top League winner: 1972.

== International career ==
Kopiy played his only game for USSR on 29 June 1972 in a friendly against Uruguay.
