= Raimundo Aguilera =

Paraguayan footballer (born 1949)

Personal information
- Full name: Raimundo Aguilera Solís
- Date of birth: 7 January 1949 (age 77)
- Place of birth: Itacurubí de la Cordillera, Paraguay
- Position: Goalkeeper

Youth career
- 1962–1965: Guaraní

Senior career*
Years	Team	Apps	(Gls)
1965–1971	Guaraní	?	(?)
1971–1974	Portuguesa	?	(?)
1974–1975	Valencia CF	?	(?)
1976–1979	Botafogo SP	?	(?)
1980	Atl. Colegiales	?	(?)

International career
1967–1970	Paraguay	11	(0)
- * Club domestic league appearances and goals

Raimundo Aguilera Solís (born 7 January 1949) is a retired football goalkeeper from Paraguay. He was a very skilled player, known for his agility and ball-handling, which helped him achieve the record of not conceding a goal in 1000 minutes twice during his career. Aguilera was known as the "Arquero de América" (goalkeeper of America).

== Career ==
Aguilera started his career in the youth divisions of Club Guaraní and eventually made it to the first team in 1965 after starting goalkeeper Isidro Alonso got injured. He was part of the "golden era" of Club Guaraní in the 1960s, where the team won most of its 1st division championships (a total of three, Aguilera was part of two in 1967 and 1969). In 1971, he signed for Brazilian club Portuguesa and eventually transferred to Europe in 1975 where he played for Valencia CF. In 1976, he was back to Brazil to play for Botafogo before returning to Paraguay to play for Atletico Colegiales and retire.

Aguilera played for the Paraguay national football team a total of 11 times between 1967 and 1970.

== Honours ==
=== Club ===
- Guaraní
  - Paraguay 1st division: 1967, 1969
- Botafogo - SP
  - Taça Cidade de São Paulo: 1977
