= Yuri Vasenin =

Soviet footballer and Russian coach (1948–2022)

Personal information
- Full name: Yuri Nikolayevich Vasenin
- Date of birth: 2 October 1948
- Place of birth: Chernyakhovsk, RSFSR, USSR
- Date of death: 2 May 2022 (aged 73)
- Position: Midfielder

Youth career
- Baltika Kaliningrad

Senior career*
Years	Team	Apps	(Gls)
1966–1967	Baltika Kaliningrad		
1968	Dynamo Stavropol		
1969	SKA Rostov-on-Don		
1970–1976	Zorya Voroshylovhrad		
1977–1978	Baltika Kaliningrad		

International career
1972–1973	USSR	9	(0)

Managerial career
- 1979: Baltika Kaliningrad (assistant)
- 1980–1990: Baltika Kaliningrad (youth teams)
- 1991–1992: Baltika Kaliningrad
- 1992–?: Baltika Kaliningrad (youth teams)
- * Club domestic league appearances and goals

Yuri Nikolayevich Vasenin (Russian: Юрий Николаевич Васенин; 2 October 1948 – 2 May 2022) was a Soviet football player and coach.

== International career ==
Vasenin made his debut for the USSR on 29 June 1972 in a friendly against Uruguay. He played in the qualifiers for 1974 FIFA World Cup, but the USSR did not qualify for the final tournament.

== Honours ==
- Soviet Top League: 1972
