= Manuel Uribe (footballer) =

Peruvian footballer (born 1940)

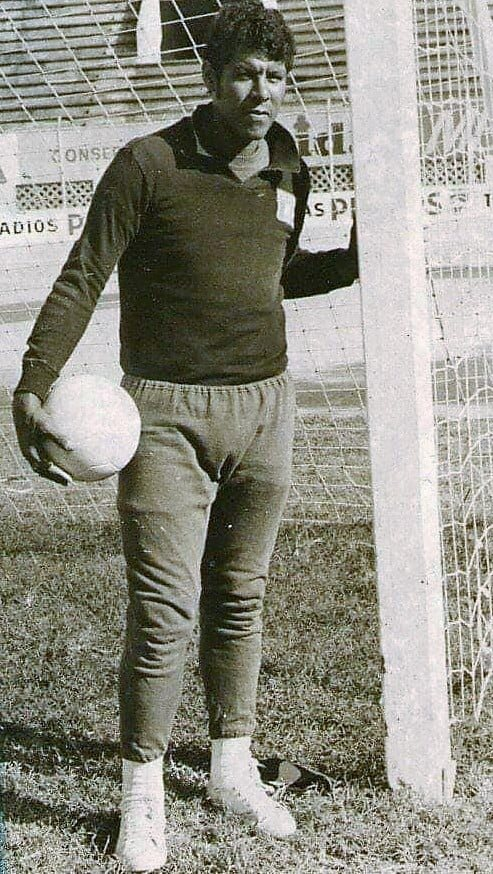

Personal information
- Full name: Manuel Isidro Uribe Infantes
- Date of birth: 14 October 1940 (age 86)
- Place of birth: San Juan de Miraflores, Lima, Peru
- Position: Goalkeeper

Senior career*
Years	Team	Apps	(Gls)
1970	Mariscal Sucre		
1971–1972	Atlético Deportivo Olímpico		
1973–1974	Defensor Lima		
1974–1975	Sport Boys		
1977	Manta		
1978	Everest		
1979	Alcides Vigo		

International career
1972–1973	Peru	14	(0)
- * Club domestic league appearances and goals

Manuel Isidro Uribe Infantes (born 14 October 1940) is a retired Peruvian association football goalkeeper. Nicknamed "Chicho", he played for a variety of clubs in the 1970s and was the primary goalkeeper of Peru during the 1974 FIFA World Cup qualifiers against Chile.

== Club career ==
Uribe is from San Juan de Miraflores and his first known club signing was with Mariscal Sucre in 1970. His biggest success came through serving as the goalkeeper for Defensor Lima during the 1973 Torneo Descentralizado, leading the club to their first title in the tournament. He also played in the 1974 Copa Libertadores, having the group lead in the group stage but ended up getting knocked out in the semi-finals. He later played for other clubs in Ecuador including Manta and Everest and for his final season, he played for Alcides Vigo in the 1979 season before retiring.

== International career ==
Uribe made his international debut for Peru during the 1971 CONMEBOL Pre-Olympic Tournament where he served as the main goalkeeper, narrowly missing qualification for the 1972 Summer Olympics. He then made his first international appearance for the senior squad at the age of 23 on 29 March 1972 in an away match against Colombia. He then participated in the Brazil Independence Cup but would remain as a substitute as Peru wouldn't advance past the group stage. Throughout his short-lived career, he would play in fourteen matches for Peru.

His international career would abruptly conclude during the 1974 FIFA World Cup qualifiers where manager Roberto Scarone would controversially select Uribe as the leading goalkeeper over Humberto Horacio Ballesteros due to naturalization laws at the time. He would play through all three matches against Chile where Peru would narrowly miss the inter-confederation playoffs against the Soviet Union. Along with the appointment of Scarone as manager over former manager Lajos Baróti, Uribe was another subject of blame for the Peruvian failure to qualify for the 1974 FIFA World Cup and retired from international football after the loss at Montevideo.
