= Petar Nikezić =

Yugoslav and Serbian footballer

Personal information
- Full name: Petar Nikezić
- Date of birth: 3 April 1950
- Place of birth: Zmajevo, FPR Yugoslavia
- Date of death: 19 July 2014 (aged 64)
- Place of death: Novi Sad, Serbia
- Height: 1.76 m (5 ft 9 in)
- Position: Forward

Youth career
- 1965–1967: Vojvodina

Senior career*
Years	Team	Apps	(Gls)
1967–1978	Vojvodina	263	(91)
1978	Tulsa Roughnecks	2	(0)
1978	VÖEST Linz	16	(1)
1979–1980	Vojvodina	26	(9)
1980–1982	Osijek	29	(11)
1983	Šibenik	6	(2)
Total		342	(114)

International career
1971–1973	Yugoslavia	3	(0)
- * Club domestic league appearances and goals

Petar Nikezić (Serbian Cyrillic: Петар Никезић; 3 April 1950 – 19 July 2014) was a Yugoslav and Serbian footballer who played as a forward. He is best remembered for his powerful shots and set pieces.

== Club career ==
During his two spells with Vojvodina (1967–78 and 1979–80), Nikezić made a total of 289 appearances and scored 100 goals in the Yugoslav First League. He also briefly played for the Tulsa Roughnecks of the North American Soccer League, before joining Austrian club VÖEST Linz in 1978.

== International career ==
At international level, Nikezić was capped three times for Yugoslavia between 1971 and 1973, his final international being a friendly match away against Tunisia.

== Honours ==
Vojvodina

- Mitropa Cup: 1976–77
