= Jorge Tapia =

Ecuadorian footballer (born 1949)

Personal information
- Date of birth: 10 April 1949 (age 77)
- Position: Midfielder

International career
Years	Team	Apps	(Gls)
1973–1975	Ecuador	4	(1)

Jorge Tapia (born 10 April 1949) was an Ecuadorian footballer. He played in four matches for the Ecuador national football team from 1973 to 1975. He was also part of Ecuador's squad for the 1975 Copa América tournament.
