= Nikolai Dolgov =

Russian footballer and manager

Personal information
- Full name: Nikolai Vasilyevich Dolgov
- Date of birth: 9 December 1946 (age 79)
- Place of birth: Oryol, USSR
- Position: Striker

Youth career
- 1960–1963: FC Lokomotiv Oryol
- 1964: FC Stal Oryol

Senior career*
Years	Team	Apps	(Gls)
1965–1968	FC Spartak Oryol		
1968	FC Spartak Moscow	0	(0)
1969–1970	FC Spartak Oryol		
1970–1972	PFC CSKA Moscow	69	(2)
1973	FC Saturn Rybinsk		
1974–1976	BSG Motor Hennigsdorf		

International career
1971	USSR	4	(0)

Managerial career
- 1995–2002: FC Oryol
- 2003–2007: FC Oryol-GTU-Olimp Oryol
- 2007: FC Oruzheynik Tula (scout)
- 2008–2010: FC Rusichi-2 Oryol
- * Club domestic league appearances and goals

Nikolai Vasilyevich Dolgov (Russian: Николай Васильевич Долгов; born 9 December 1946, in Oryol) is a Russian football manager and a former player who won the Soviet Top League in 1970.

== Honours ==
- Soviet Top League winner: 1970.

== International career ==
Dolgov made his debut for USSR on 17 February 1971 in a friendly against Mexico.
