= Armando Larrea =

Ecuadorian footballer (1943–2024)

Personal information
- Full name: Armando Estuardo Larrea Real
- Date of birth: 11 May 1943
- Place of birth: Guaranda, Ecuador
- Date of death: 28 July 2024 (aged 81)
- Position: Forward

Senior career*
Years	Team	Apps	(Gls)
1960–1962	L.D.U. Quito		
1963	Everest		
1964	L.D.U. Quito		
1965	Deportivo Quito		
1966–1970	L.D.U. Quito		
1971–1974	Universidad Catolica		

International career
1963	Ecuador	6	(0)
- * Club domestic league appearances and goals

Armando Estuardo Larrea Real (11 May 1943 – 28 July 2024) was an Ecuadorian footballer who played as a forward. He made six appearances for the Ecuador national team in 1963. He was also part of Ecuador's squad for the 1963 South American Championship. He died on 28 July 2024, at the age of 81.
