= Alireza Hajghasem =

Iranian footballer

Personal information
- Full name: Alireza Hajghasem
- Date of birth: 19 March 1943 (age 83)
- Place of birth: Tehran, Iran
- Height: 1.75 m (5 ft 9 in)
- Position: Midfielder

Senior career*
Years	Team	Apps	(Gls)
1969–1973	Taj Tehran		
1973–1975	Pas Tehran		

International career
1972	Iran	4	(0)
- * Club domestic league appearances and goals

Alireza Hajghasem is an Iranian football midfielder who played for Iran in the 1964 Summer Olympics . He also played for Taj SC.
