= 1967 South American Championship squads =

List of footballers

These are the squads for the countries that played in the final tournament of 1967 South American Championship. The participating countries were Argentina, Bolivia, Chile, Paraguay and Uruguay and Venezuela. The teams played in a single round-robin tournament, earning two points for a win, one point for a draw, and zero points for a loss.

== Argentina ==
Head Coach: Jim López (Argentina)

No.	Pos.	Player	Date of birth (age)	Caps	Goals	Club
—	DF	David Acevedo	20 February 1937 (aged 29)	0	0	(Argentine Football Association) Independiente
—	MF	Rafael Albrecht	23 August 1941 (aged 25)	23	0	(Argentine Football Association) San Lorenzo
—	FW	Luis Artime	2 December 1938 (aged 28)	20	19	(Argentine Football Association) Independiente
—	MF	Raúl Bernao	4 November 1941 (aged 25)	7	2	(Argentine Football Association) Independiente
—	DF	Oscar Calics	18 November 1939 (aged 27)	1	0	(Argentine Football Association) San Lorenzo
—	FW	Juan Carlos Carone	18 May 1942 (aged 24)	0	0	(Argentine Football Association) Vélez Sarsfield
—	FW	Alberto Mario González	21 August 1941 (aged 25)	14	1	(Argentine Football Association) Boca Juniors
—	DF	Silvio Marzolini	4 October 1940 (aged 26)	17	0	(Argentine Football Association) Boca Juniors
—	FW	Oscar Mas	29 October 1946 (aged 20)	13	2	(Argentine Football Association) River Plate
—	DF	Iselín Santos Ovejero	16 October 1945 (aged 21)	0	0	(Argentine Football Association) Vélez Sarsfield
—	FW	Norberto Raffo	27 April 1939 (aged 27)	2	0	(Argentine Football Association) Banfield
—	MF	Antonio Rattín	16 May 1937 (aged 29)	30	1	(Argentine Football Association) Boca Juniors
—	FW	Alfredo Rojas	20 February 1937 (aged 29)	11	2	(Argentine Football Association) Boca Juniors
—	GK	Antonio Roma	13 July 1932 (aged 34)	37	0	(Argentine Football Association) Boca Juniors
—	DF	Antonio Rosl	21 March 1944 (aged 22)	0	0	(Argentine Football Association) Gimnasia y Esgrima (LP)
—	FW	Juan Carlos Sarnari	22 January 1942 (aged 24)	0	0	(Argentine Football Association) River Plate
—	FW	Héctor Veira	29 May 1946 (aged 20)	1	0	(Argentine Football Association) San Lorenzo
—	MF	Sebastián Viberti	5 May 1944 (aged 22)	0	0	(Argentine Football Association) Huracán

== Bolivia ==
Head Coach: José Carlos Trigo (Bolivia)

No.	Pos.	Player	Date of birth (age)	Caps	Goals	Club
—	MF	Guery Agreda	19 January 1942 (aged 24)	0	0	(Bolivian Football Federation) Jorge Wilstermann
—	FW	Ramiro Blacut	3 January 1944 (aged 23)	4	1	(Bolivian Football Federation) Club Bolívar
—	MF	Wilfredo Camacho	21 June 1935 (aged 31)	12	4	(Bolivian Football Federation) Deportivo Municipal
—	GK	Griseldo Cobo	27 January 1938 (aged 28)	0	0	(Bolivian Football Federation) Always Ready
—	FW	Rómulo Cortez	23 July 1937 (aged 29)	0	0	(Bolivian Football Federation) Always Ready
—	MF	Adolfo Flores	12 February 1942 (aged 24)	0	0	(Bolivian Football Federation) Chaco Petrolero
—	FW	Ausberto García	9 February 1934 (aged 32)	9	4	(Bolivian Football Federation) Jorge Wilstermann
—	MF	Jaime Herbas	25 September 1941 (aged 25)	1	0	(Bolivian Football Federation) Jorge Wilstermann
—	MF	Jesús Herbas	2 February 1940 (aged 26)	3	0	(Bolivian Football Federation) Jorge Wilstermann
—	GK	José Issa	28 May 1942 (aged 24)	0	0	(Bolivian Football Federation) Jorge Wilstermann
—	FW	Renán López	31 October 1939 (aged 27)	10	1	(Bolivian Football Federation) Jorge Wilstermann
—	DF	Isaac Maldonado		0	0	(Bolivian Football Federation) 31 de Octubre
—	DF	Hugo Palenque	1 December 1937 (aged 29)	1	0	(Bolivian Football Federation) 31 de Octubre
—	FW	Edgar Quinteros	19 July 1940 (aged 26)	1	0	(Bolivian Football Federation) 31 de Octubre
—	DF	Oscar Quiroga		0	0	(Bolivian Football Federation) Deportivo Municipal
—	MF	César Sánchez	29 January 1935 (aged 31)	2	0	(Bolivian Football Federation) Jorge Wilstermann
—	DF	Roberto Troncoso		0	0	(Bolivian Football Federation) Jorge Wilstermann
—	FW	Jorge Urdidínea		0	0	(Bolivian Football Federation) Club Bolívar
—	FW	Rolando Vargas	10 April 1939 (aged 27)	0	0	(Bolivian Football Federation) Jorge Wilstermann
—	DF	Mario Zabalaga	4 March 1938 (aged 28)	0	0	(Bolivian Football Federation) Jorge Wilstermann

== Chile ==
Head Coach: (Argentina) Alejandro Scopelli

No.	Pos.	Player	Date of birth (age)	Caps	Goals	Club
—	DF	Víctor Adriazola	3 June 1943 (aged 23)	2	0	(Football Federation of Chile) Universidad Católica
—	FW	Pedro Araya	23 January 1942 (aged 24)	22	5	(Football Federation of Chile) Universidad de Chile
—	FW	Carlos Campos	14 February 1937 (aged 29)	11	3	(Football Federation of Chile) Universidad de Chile
—	DF	Víctor Castañeda	21 December 1936 (aged 30)	0	0	(Football Federation of Chile) Palestino
—	MF	Osvaldo Castro	17 October 1947 (aged 19)	2	2	(Football Federation of Chile) Unión La Calera
—	DF	Humberto Cruz	14 December 1939 (aged 27)	19	0	(Football Federation of Chile) Colo Colo
—	DF	Elías Figueroa	25 October 1946 (aged 20)	12	0	(Football Federation of Chile) Santiago Wanderers
—	FW	Julio Gallardo	16 June 1942 (aged 24)	2	0	(Football Federation of Chile) Universidad Católica
—	DF	Eduardo Herrera	25 August 1944 (aged 22)	0	0	(Football Federation of Chile) Santiago Wanderers
—	MF	Roberto Hodge	30 July 1944 (aged 22)	11	0	(Football Federation of Chile) Universidad de Chile
—	MF	Rubén Marcos	6 December 1942 (aged 24)	21	5	(Football Federation of Chile) Universidad de Chile
—	DF	José Moris	17 July 1939 (aged 27)	0	0	(Football Federation of Chile) Palestino
—	GK	Juan Olivares	20 February 1941 (aged 25)	8	0	(Football Federation of Chile) Santiago Wanderers
—	MF	Ignacio Prieto	23 September 1943 (aged 23)	17	3	(Football Federation of Chile) Universidad Católica
—	FW	Manuel Saavedra	24 April 1941 (aged 25)	1	1	(Football Federation of Chile) Unión La Calera
—	FW	Armando Tobar	7 June 1938 (aged 28)	30	3	(Football Federation of Chile) Universidad Católica
—	DF	Hugo Villanueva	9 April 1939 (aged 27)	21	0	(Football Federation of Chile) Universidad de Chile

== Paraguay ==
Head Coach: (Paraguay) Benjamín Fernández

No.	Pos.	Player	Date of birth (age)	Caps	Goals	Club
—	MF	Benigno Apodaca	16 April 1939 (aged 27)	2	1	(Paraguayan Football Association) Olimpia
—	DF	Vicente Bobadilla	5 April 1938 (aged 28)	9	0	(Paraguayan Football Association) Guaraní
—	MF	Mercedes Colmán		1	0	(Paraguayan Football Association) Sol de América
—	MF	Ramón Colmán		0	0	(Paraguayan Football Association) Cerro Porteño
—	FW	Arístides del Puerto	17 January 1947 (aged 19)	2	1	(Paraguayan Football Association) Olimpia
—	FW	Ladislao Delgadillo		0	0	(Paraguayan Football Association) Sol de América
—	FW	Wilfrido Garay	18 July 1944 (aged 22)	0	0	(Paraguayan Football Association) Club Nacional
—	FW	Antonio González	3 May 1936 (aged 30)	1	0	(Paraguayan Football Association) Olimpia
—	DF	Ricardo González	7 February 1945 (aged 21)	2	0	(Paraguayan Football Association) Cerro Porteño
—	DF	Antonio Insfrán	17 January 1942 (aged 24)	12	0	(Paraguayan Football Association) Guaraní
—	FW	Aurelio Martínez	22 August 1942 (aged 24)	0	0	(Paraguayan Football Association) Guaraní
—	MF	Francisco Miranda	21 August 1941 (aged 25)	1	0	(Paraguayan Football Association) Cerro Porteño
—	FW	Celino Mora	21 October 1945 (aged 21)	2	2	(Paraguayan Football Association) Cerro Porteño
—	GK	Humberto Núñez	3 May 1945 (aged 21)	2	0	(Paraguayan Football Association) Sol de América
—	DF	Rodolfo Patiño		2	0	(Paraguayan Football Association) Guaraní
—	FW	Juan Riveros	16 May 1946 (aged 20)	0	0	(Paraguayan Football Association) Cerro Porteño
—	MF	Juan Rojas	17 December 1945 (aged 21)	2	1	(Paraguayan Football Association) Cerro Porteño
—	MF	Sergio Rojas	28 September 1940 (aged 26)	2	0	(Paraguayan Football Association) Guaraní
—	FW	Arsenio Valdez	12 December 1942 (aged 24)	7	0	(Paraguayan Football Association) Guaraní
—	GK	Artemio Villanueva	9 November 1945 (aged 21)	1	0	(Paraguayan Football Association) Cerro Porteño
—	GK	Gumercindo Yudis	13 January 1944 (aged 23)	0	0	(Paraguayan Football Association) Guaraní

== Uruguay ==
Head Coach:Juan Carlos Corazzo (Uruguay)

No.	Pos.	Player	Date of birth (age)	Caps	Goals	Club
—	FW	Jorge Acuña		0	0	(Uruguayan Football Association) Sud América
—	DF	Elgar Baeza	8 November 1939 (aged 27)	1	0	(Uruguayan Football Association) Nacional
—	GK	Miguel Ángel Bazzano	22 November 1945 (aged 21)	0	0	(Uruguayan Football Association) Danubio
—	MF	Omar Caetano	8 November 1938 (aged 28)	5	0	(Uruguayan Football Association) Peñarol
—	GK	Jacinto Callero	13 February 1945 (aged 21)	1	0	(Uruguayan Football Association) Rampla Juniors
—	DF	Héctor Cincunegui	28 July 1940 (aged 26)	3	0	(Uruguayan Football Association) Nacional
—	DF	Pablo Forlán	14 July 1945 (aged 21)	0	0	(Uruguayan Football Association) Peñarol
—	MF	Abayubá Ibáñez		1	0	(Uruguayan Football Association) Defensor Sporting
—	DF	Carlos Martínez	30 September 1940 (aged 26)	0	0	(Uruguayan Football Association) Fénix
—	GK	Ladislao Mazurkiewicz	14 February 1945 (aged 21)	4	0	(Uruguayan Football Association) Peñarol
—	MF	Julio Montero	25 April 1944 (aged 22)	0	0	(Uruguayan Football Association) Nacional
—	DF	Juan Mugica	22 December 1943 (aged 23)	0	0	(Uruguayan Football Association) Nacional
—	FW	Jorge Oyarbide	6 July 1944 (aged 22)	0	0	(Uruguayan Football Association) Nacional
—	MF	Juan Carlos Paz	6 September 1944 (aged 22)	0	0	(Uruguayan Football Association) Racing de Montevideo
—	FW	Domingo Pérez	7 June 1936 (aged 30)	15	2	(Uruguayan Football Association) Nacional
—	MF	Pedro Rocha	3 December 1942 (aged 24)	8	1	(Uruguayan Football Association) Peñarol
—	FW	Héctor Salvá	27 November 1939 (aged 27)	2	0	(Uruguayan Football Association) Danubio
—	MF	Rubén Techera	12 December 1946 (aged 20)	0	0	(Uruguayan Football Association) Nacional
—	FW	José Urrusmendi	25 August 1944 (aged 22)	0	0	(Uruguayan Football Association) Nacional
—	DF	Luis Varela	22 August 1941 (aged 25)	1	0	(Uruguayan Football Association) Peñarol
—	FW	Luis Alberto Vera	1 November 1943 (aged 23)	0	0	(Uruguayan Football Association) Fénix

== Venezuela ==
Head Coach: (Argentina) Rafael Franco

No.	Pos.	Player	Date of birth (age)	Caps	Goals	Club
—	GK	Johny Arocha	24 June 1943 (aged 23)	0	0	(Venezuelan Football Federation) UD Canarias
—	GK	Omar Colmenares	13 December 1945 (aged 21)	0	0	(Venezuelan Football Federation) Valencia
—	DF	Freddy Elie	10 March 1946 (aged 20)	0	0	(Venezuelan Football Federation) Deportivo Galicia
—	GK	Vito Fassano	11 February 1940 (aged 26)	0	0	(Venezuelan Football Federation) Deportivo Italia
—	MF	Salvador Gala		0	0	(Venezuelan Football Federation) Litoral
—	DF	Gustavo González		0	0	(Venezuelan Football Federation) Deportivo Italia
—	DF	Omar González		0	0	(Venezuelan Football Federation) Valencia
—	MF	Pedro Alfonso González		0	0	(Venezuelan Football Federation) Deportivo Portugués
—	MF	Luis Mendoza	21 June 1945 (aged 21)	0	0	(Venezuelan Football Federation) Deportivo Italia
—	DF	David Mota	16 February 1942 (aged 24)	0	0	(Venezuelan Football Federation) Deportivo Galicia
—	DF	Rafael Naranjo	6 June 1943 (aged 23)	0	0	(Venezuelan Football Federation) Lara
—	FW	Antonio Ravelo	2 April 1940 (aged 26)	0	0	(Venezuelan Football Federation) UD Canarias
—	DF	Miguel Ruiz		0	0	(Venezuelan Football Federation) Litoral
—	FW	Rafael Santana	3 March 1945 (aged 21)	0	0	(Venezuelan Football Federation) Deportivo Galicia
—	FW	Humberto Scovino	20 December 1942 (aged 24)	0	0	(Venezuelan Football Federation) Valencia
—	FW	Argenis Tortolero	16 March 1941 (aged 25)	0	0	(Venezuelan Football Federation) Lara
—	DF	José Vidal	26 May 1938 (aged 28)	0	0	(Venezuelan Football Federation) Lara
—	DF	José Zarzalejo	7 November 1942 (aged 24)	0	0	(Venezuelan Football Federation) Nacional Táchira
