= Paraguay national football team results (1960–1979) =

This page details the match results and statistics of the Paraguay national football team from 1960 to 1979.

== Key ==
Key to matches

- Att.=Match attendance
- (H)=Home ground
- (A)=Away ground
- (N)=Neutral ground

Key to record by opponent

- Pld=Games played
- W=Games won
- D=Games drawn
- L=Games lost
- GF=Goals for
- GA=Goals against

== Results ==
Paraguay's score is shown first in each case.

No.	Date	Venue	Opponents	Score	Competition	Paraguay scorers	Att.	Ref.
164	3 July 1960	Estadio Club Libertad, Asunción (H)	Brazil	1–2	Taça do Atlântico	Cabrera	—	
165	9 July 1960	Estadio Monumental, Buenos Aires (A)	Argentina	0–1	Taça do Atlântico		—	
166	13 July 1960	Estadio Centenario, Montevideo (A)	Uruguay	1–2	Taça do Atlântico	P. Cabral	—	
167	18 December 1960	Santiago (A)	Chile	1–4	Friendly	Cabrera	—	
168	21 December 1960	Valparaíso (A)	Chile	1–3	Friendly	Lopez	—	
169	19 March 1961	Panama City (A)	Panama	0–0	Friendly		—	
170	30 April 1961	Estadio Defensores del Chaco, Asunción (H)	Brazil	0–2	Taça Oswaldo Cruz		—	
171	3 May 1961	Estadio Defensores del Chaco, Asunción (H)	Brazil	2–3	Taça Oswaldo Cruz	C. Martínez (2)	—	
172	17 May 1961	Asunción (H)	Argentina	0–0	Friendly		—	
173	29 June 1961	Maracanã Stadium, Rio de Janeiro (A)	Brazil	2–3	Friendly	Fretes, Parodi	—	
174	12 October 1961	Estadio de Independiente, Avellaneda (A)	Argentina	1–5	Friendly	J. Gonzalez	—	
175	29 October 1961	Estadio Olímpico Universitario, Mexico City (A)	Mexico	0–1	1962 FIFA World Cup qualification		80,000	
176	5 November 1961	Estadio Defensores del Chaco, Asunción (H)	Mexico	0–0	1962 FIFA World Cup qualification		15,000	
177	21 April 1962	Maracanã Stadium, Rio de Janeiro (A)	Brazil	0–6	Taça Oswaldo Cruz		—	
178	24 April 1962	Pacaembu Stadium, São Paulo (A)	Brazil	0–4	Taça Oswaldo Cruz		—	
179	10 August 1962	Estadio Félix Capriles, Cochabamba (A)	Bolivia	1–3	Copa Paz del Chaco	E. Insfrán	—	
180	12 August 1962	Estadio Hernando Siles, La Paz (A)	Bolivia	2–3	Copa Paz del Chaco	Samaniego, Nunez	—	
181	17 February 1963	Asunción (H)	Bolivia	3–0	Copa Paz del Chaco	Valdez, R. Rodríguez, Cabrera	—	
182	19 February 1963	Asunción (H)	Bolivia	5–1	Copa Paz del Chaco	Villamayor (2), Cabrera, Arámbulo, D. Martinez	—	
183	3 March 1963	Estadio Defensores del Chaco, Asunción (H)	Brazil	2–2	Friendly	R. Rodríguez, E. Insfrán	—	
184	14 March 1963	Estadio Hernando Siles, La Paz (N)	Ecuador	3–1	1963 South American Championship	Zárate, Cabrera, Quiñonez	15,000	
185	17 March 1963	Estadio Hernando Siles, La Paz (N)	Brazil	2–0	1963 South American Championship	Zárate, Ayala	8,000	
186	20 March 1963	Estadio Félix Capriles, Cochabamba (N)	Colombia	3–2	1963 South American Championship	Zárate, Arámbulo, C. Martínez	10,000	
187	24 March 1963	Estadio Félix Capriles, Cochabamba (N)	Bolivia	0–2	1963 South American Championship		18,000	
188	27 March 1963	Estadio Félix Capriles, Cochabamba (N)	Peru	4–1	1963 South American Championship	C. Martínez (2), Cabrera, Zárate	20,000	
189	31 March 1963	Estadio Hernando Siles, La Paz (N)	Argentina	1–1	1963 South American Championship	Cabrera	15,000	
190	15 October 1963	Estadio Defensores del Chaco, Asunción (H)	Argentina	0–4	Copa Rosa Chevallier Boutell		—	
191	29 October 1963	Estadio Monumental, Buenos Aires (A)	Argentina	3–2	Copa Rosa Chevallier Boutell	P. Rojas (2), Ayala	—	
192	25 November 1964	Estadio Defensores del Chaco, Asunción (H)	Argentina	3–0	Copa Rosa Chevallier Boutell	Candia, Ivaldi, Garcia	—	
193	8 December 1964	Estadio Monumental, Buenos Aires (A)	Argentina	1–8	Copa Rosa Chevallier Boutell	Pavon	—	
194	10 March 1965	Guatemala City (A)	Guatemala	4–1	Friendly	Ayala, Caceres (2), Riquelme	—	
195	14 March 1965	Guatemala City (A)	Guatemala	3–0	Friendly	Pavon, Riquelme, J. Rojas	—	
196	17 March 1965	San José (A)	Costa Rica	0–1	Friendly		—	
197	19 March 1965	San José (A)	Costa Rica	0–0	Friendly		—	
198	3 April 1965	Lima (A)	Peru	1–0	Friendly	Riquelme	—	
199	24 April 1965	Asunción (H)	Uruguay	2–1	Copa Artigas	Riquelme, Caceres	—	
200	1 May 1965	Estadio Centenario, Montevideo (A)	Uruguay	0–4	Copa Artigas		—	
201	25 July 1965	Estadio Defensores del Chaco, Asunción (H)	Bolivia	2–0	1966 FIFA World Cup qualification	V. Rodriguez, J. Rojas	18,396	
202	1 August 1965	Estadio Monumental, Buenos Aires (A)	Argentina	0–3	1966 FIFA World Cup qualification		63,817	
203	8 August 1965	Estadio Defensores del Chaco, Asunción (H)	Argentina	0–0	1966 FIFA World Cup qualification		20,763	
204	22 August 1965	Estadio Hernando Siles, La Paz (A)	Bolivia	1–2	1966 FIFA World Cup qualification		7,000	
205	24 April 1966	Estadio Olímpico Universitario, Mexico City (A)	Mexico	0–7	Friendly		33,800	
206	15 May 1966	Asunción (H)	Uruguay	2–2	Copa Artigas	Torres, A. González	—	
207	18 May 1966	Estadio Centenario, Montevideo (A)	Uruguay	1–3	Copa Artigas	Torres	—	
208	21 December 1966	Estadio Modelo, Guayaquil (A)	Ecuador	2–2	1967 South American Championship qualification	J. Rojas, Apocada	47,000	
209	28 December 1966	Estadio Manuel Ferreira, Asunción (H)	Ecuador	3–1	1967 South American Championship qualification	Mora (2), Del Puerto	25,000	
210	18 January 1967	Estadio Centenario, Montevideo (N)	Argentina	1–4	1967 South American Championship	Mora	12,000	
211	22 January 1967	Estadio Centenario, Montevideo (N)	Chile	2–4	1967 South American Championship	Riveros, Apocada	6,000	
212	25 January 1967	Estadio Centenario, Montevideo (N)	Bolivia	1–0	1967 South American Championship	Del Puerto	5,000	
213	29 January 1967	Estadio Centenario, Montevideo (N)	Uruguay	0–2	1967 South American Championship		17,000	
214	1 February 1967	Estadio Centenario, Montevideo (N)	Venezuela	5–3	1967 South American Championship	A. González, J. Rojas (2), Mora, Colmán	1,500	
215	13 October 1967	Asunción (H)	Argentina	1–1	Friendly	Fleitas	—	
216	15 May 1968	Asunción (H)	Argentina	2–0	Friendly	Mora, Garcia	—	
217	2 June 1968	Asunción (H)	Uruguay	0–0	Copa Artigas		—	
218	25 July 1968	Estadio Defensores del Chaco, Asunción (H)	Brazil	0–4	Taça Oswaldo Cruz		—	
219	28 July 1968	Estadio Defensores del Chaco, Asunción (H)	Brazil	1–0	Taça Oswaldo Cruz	V. Cabral	—	
220	19 March 1969	Rosario (A)	Argentina	1–1	Friendly	Irala	—	
221	9 April 1969	Asunción (H)	Argentina	0–0	Friendly		—	
222	8 June 1969	Asunción (H)	Chile	0–1	Friendly		—	
223	6 July 1969	Santiago (A)	Chile	0–0	Friendly		45,000	
224	9 July 1969	Lima (A)	Peru	1–2	Friendly	Mora	30,000	
225	18 July 1969	Lima (A)	Peru	1–2	Friendly	Sosa	—	
226	6 August 1969	University Stadium, Caracas (A)	Venezuela	2–0	1970 FIFA World Cup qualification	J. Rojas (2)	9,110	
227	10 August 1969	Estadio El Campín, Bogotá (A)	Colombia	1–0	1970 FIFA World Cup qualification	A. Martínez	51,049	
228	17 August 1969	Estadio Defensores del Chaco, Asunción (H)	Brazil	0–3	1970 FIFA World Cup qualification		44,880	
229	21 August 1969	Estadio Defensores del Chaco, Asunción (H)	Venezuela	1–0	1970 FIFA World Cup qualification	Jiménez	11,509	
230	24 August 1969	Estadio Defensores del Chaco, Asunción (H)	Colombia	2–1	1970 FIFA World Cup qualification	Arrúa (2)	14,744	
231	31 August 1969	Maracanã Stadium, Rio de Janeiro (A)	Brazil	0–1	1970 FIFA World Cup qualification		183,341	
232	4 April 1970	Maracanã Stadium, Rio de Janeiro (A)	Brazil	0–0	Friendly		72,000	
233	22 October 1970	Asunción (H)	Argentina	1–1	Friendly	Irala	—	
234	4 July 1971	Estadio Defensores del Chaco, Asunción (H)	Argentina	1–1	Copa Rosa Chevallier Boutell	Arrúa	—	
235	9 July 1971	Estadio Lisandro de la Torre, Rosario (A)	Argentina	0–1	Copa Rosa Chevallier Boutell		—	
236	14 July 1971	Santiago (A)	Chile	2–3	Friendly	Arrúa (2)	30,000	
237	24 July 1971	Maracanã Stadium, Rio de Janeiro (A)	Brazil	0–1	Friendly		40,000	
238	27 July 1971	Lima (A)	Peru	0–0	Friendly		40,000	
239	8 August 1971	Asunción (H)	Chile	2–0	Friendly	Arrúa, Escobar	—	
240	15 August 1971	Asunción (H)	Peru	2–0	Friendly	Arrúa (2)	—	
241	26 April 1972	Estádio Beira-Rio, Porto Alegre (A)	Brazil	2–3	Friendly	Escobar, Diarte	—	
242	25 May 1972	Salta (A)	Argentina	0–0	Friendly		—	
243	11 June 1972	Morenão, Campo Grande (N)	Venezuela	4–1	Brazil Independence Cup	Jiménez, Escobar, Maldonado (2)	—	
244	14 June 1972	Morenão, Campo Grande (N)	Peru	1–0	Brazil Independence Cup	Godoy	—	
245	22 June 1972	Vivaldão, Manaus (N)	Yugoslavia	1–2	Brazil Independence Cup	Escobar	25,000	
246	25 June 1972	Vivaldão, Manaus (N)	Bolivia	6–1	Brazil Independence Cup	Maldonado (2), Arrúa (4), Dos Santos	—	
247	28 March 1973	Lima (A)	Peru	0–1	Friendly		—	
248	31 March 1973	La Paz (A)	Bolivia	1–1	Friendly	Jiménez	—	
249	8 April 1973	Asunción (H)	Peru	1–1	Friendly	Maldonado	—	
250	2 September 1973	Estadio Hernando Siles, La Paz (A)	Bolivia	2–1	1974 FIFA World Cup qualification	Escobar, Jorge Insfrán	19,384	
251	16 September 1973	Estadio Defensores del Chaco, Asunción (H)	Argentina	1–1	1974 FIFA World Cup qualification	Arrúa	47,116	
252	30 September 1973	Estadio Defensores del Chaco, Asunción (H)	Bolivia	4–0	1974 FIFA World Cup qualification	Bareiro, Osorio, Jorge Insfrán, Arrúa	24,268	
253	7 October 1973	Boca Juniors Stadium, Buenos Aires (A)	Argentina	1–3	1974 FIFA World Cup qualification	Escobar	58,657	
254	12 May 1974	Maracanã Stadium, Rio de Janeiro (A)	Brazil	0–2	Friendly		—	
255	22 December 1974	Santiago (A)	Chile	0–1	Friendly		—	
256	12 June 1975	Asunción (H)	Uruguay	0–1	Copa Artigas		—	
257	19 June 1975	Estadio Centenario, Montevideo (A)	Uruguay	1–0	Copa Artigas	Rolón	—	
258	7 July 1975	Cochabamba (A)	Bolivia	2–1	Friendly	José Insfrán, Ocampos	—	
259	10 July 1975	Lima (A)	Peru	0–2	Friendly		—	
260	20 July 1975	Estadio El Campín, Bogotá (A)	Colombia	0–1	1975 Copa América		60,000	
261	24 July 1975	Estadio Modelo, Guayaquil (A)	Ecuador	2–2	1975 Copa América	Kiese (2)	50,000	
262	30 July 1975	Estadio Defensores del Chaco, Asunción (H)	Colombia	0–1	1975 Copa América		50,000	
263	10 August 1975	Estadio Defensores del Chaco, Asunción (H)	Ecuador	3–1	1975 Copa América	Báez, Rolón (2)	10,000	
264	25 February 1976	Estadio Defensores del Chaco, Asunción (H)	Argentina	2–3	Taça do Atlântico	Báez, Aquino	—	
265	10 March 1976	Estadio Centenario, Montevideo (A)	Uruguay	2–2	Taça do Atlântico	Pesoa, Paniagua	—	
266	7 April 1976	Estadio Defensores del Chaco, Asunción (H)	Brazil	1–1	Taça do Atlântico	Aquino	—	
267	28 April 1976	José Amalfitani Stadium, Buenos Aires (A)	Argentina	2–2	Taça do Atlântico	Rivera, Aquino	—	
268	19 May 1976	Asunción (H)	Uruguay	1–0	Taça do Atlântico	Solalinde	—	
269	9 June 1976	Maracanã Stadium, Rio de Janeiro (A)	Brazil	1–3	Taça do Atlântico	Díaz	—	
270	9 January 1977	Asunción (H)	Ecuador	2–0	Friendly	Colmán, Aquino	—	
271	12 January 1977	Asunción (H)	Uruguay	1–1	Copa Artigas	Solalinde	—	
272	23 January 1977	Estadio Centenario, Montevideo (A)	Uruguay	1–2	Copa Artigas	Villalba	—	
273	26 January 1977	Santiago (A)	Chile	0–4	Friendly		—	
274	2 February 1977	Asunción (H)	Chile	2–0	Friendly	Aifuch, Báez	—	
275	6 February 1977	Estadio Hernando Siles, La Paz (A)	Bolivia	1–0	Copa Paz del Chaco	Bareiro	—	
276	9 February 1977	Estadio Hernando Siles, La Paz (A)	Bolivia	2–2	Copa Paz del Chaco	Aifuch, Sosa	—	
277	13 February 1977	Quito (A)	Ecuador	1–2	Friendly	Espínola	—	
278	20 February 1977	Panama City (A)	Panama	4–0	Friendly	Unknown	—	
279	24 February 1977	Estadio El Campín, Bogotá (A)	Colombia	1–0	1978 FIFA World Cup qualification	Jara	45,838	
280	6 March 1977	Estadio Defensores del Chaco, Asunción (H)	Colombia	1–1	1978 FIFA World Cup qualification	Jara	30,154	
281	13 March 1977	Estadio Defensores del Chaco, Asunción (H)	Brazil	0–1	1978 FIFA World Cup qualification		40,490	
282	20 March 1977	Maracanã Stadium, Rio de Janeiro (A)	Brazil	1–1	1978 FIFA World Cup qualification	Báez	94,947	
283	24 August 1977	Buenos Aires (A)	Argentina	1–2	Copa Félix Bogado	Escobar	—	
284	31 August 1977	Asunción (H)	Argentina	2–0 (3–1p)	Copa Félix Bogado	Tarantini (o.g.), Unknown	—	
285	17 May 1979	Maracanã Stadium, Rio de Janeiro (A)	Brazil	0–6	Friendly		70,627	
286	10 July 1979	Estadio Hernando Siles, La Paz (A)	Bolivia	1–3	Copa Paz del Chaco	Benitez	—	
287	12 July 1979	Cochabamba (A)	Bolivia	1–1	Friendly	Isasi	—	
288	1 August 1979	Asunción (H)	Bolivia	2–0 (3–4p)	Copa Paz del Chaco	Solalinde, Meza	—	
289	29 August 1979	Estadio Olímpico Atahualpa, Quito (A)	Ecuador	2–1	1979 Copa América	Talavera, Solalinde	45,000	
290	13 September 1979	Estadio Defensores del Chaco, Asunción (H)	Ecuador	2–0	1979 Copa América	E. Morel, Osorio	25,000	
291	20 September 1979	Estadio Defensores del Chaco, Asunción (H)	Uruguay	0–0	1979 Copa América		25,000	
292	26 September 1979	Estadio Centenario, Montevideo (A)	Uruguay	2–2	1979 Copa América	E. Morel (2)	18,000	
293	10 October 1979	Lima (A)	Peru	3–2	Friendly	Acosta, Espínola, E. Morel	—	
294	24 October 1979	Estadio Defensores del Chaco, Asunción (H)	Brazil	2–1	1979 Copa América	E. Morel, Talavera	50,000	
295	31 October 1979	Maracanã Stadium, Rio de Janeiro (A)	Brazil	2–2	1979 Copa América	M. Morel, Romerito	80,000	
296	28 November 1979	Estadio Defensores del Chaco, Asunción (H)	Chile	3–0	1979 Copa América	Romerito (2), M. Morel	40,000	
297	5 December 1979	Estadio Nacional, Santiago (A)	Chile	0–1	1979 Copa América		55,000	
298	11 December 1979	José Amalfitani Stadium, Buenos Aires (N)	Chile	0–0 (a.e.t.)	1979 Copa América		6,000	

Notes

1. A: Match abandoned after 70 minutes when Uruguay left the field.
2. B: Match abandoned after 43 minutes.
3. C: Matches against Argentina during the 1976 Taça do Atlântico doubled as the 1976 Copa Félix Bogado.
4. D: Matches against Brazil during the 1976 Taça do Atlântico doubled as the 1976 Copa Oswaldo Cruz.

== Record by opponent ==
Team	Pld	W	D	L	GF	GA	GD	WPCT
Argentina	25	4	11	10	25	44	−19	16.00
Bolivia	18	10	3	5	37	21	+16	55.56
Brazil	23	3	5	15	19	51	−32	13.04
Chile	13	3	2	8	13	21	−8	23.08
Colombia	7	4	1	2	8	6	+2	57.14
Costa Rica	2	0	1	1	0	1	−1	0.00
Ecuador	9	6	2	1	20	10	+10	66.67
Guatemala	2	2	0	0	7	1	+6	100.00
Mexico	3	0	1	2	0	8	−8	0.00
Panama	2	1	1	0	4	0	+4	50.00
Peru	11	5	2	4	14	11	+3	45.45
Uruguay	15	3	6	6	14	22	−8	20.00
Venezuela	4	4	0	0	12	4	+8	100.00
Yugoslavia	1	0	0	1	1	2	−1	0.00
Total	135	45	35	55	174	202	−28	33.33

Source: Results
