= Luis Vera =

Luis Vera can refer to:

- Luis Vera (Chilean footballer) (1929-2014), Chilean football left-back
- Luis Vera (Uruguayan footballer) (born 1943), Uruguayan football forward
- Luis R. Vera (born 1952), Chilean film director
- Luis Vera (Venezuelan footballer) (born 1973), Venezuelan football midfielder
