= Rafael Naranjo =

Venezuelan footballer (born 1943)

Personal information
- Date of birth: 6 June 1943 (age 83)
- Position: Defender

International career
Years	Team	Apps	(Gls)
1967–1969	Venezuela	6	(0)

Rafael Naranjo (born 6 June 1943) is a Venezuelan footballer. He played in six matches for the Venezuela national football team from 1967 to 1969. He was also part of Venezuela's squad for the 1967 South American Championship.
