= Omar Colmenares =

Venezuelan footballer (born 1945)

Personal information
- Date of birth: 13 December 1945 (age 80)
- Position: Goalkeeper

International career
Years	Team	Apps	(Gls)
1967–1975	Venezuela	9	(0)

Omar Colmenares (born 13 December 1945) is a Venezuelan former footballer. He was part of Venezuela's squads for the 1967 South American Championship and the 1975 Copa América.
