= Callero =

Callero is a surname. Notable people with the surname include:

- Jacinto Callero (born 1945), Uruguayan footballer
- Joe Callero (born 1962), American basketball coach
