= José Vidal (Venezuelan footballer) =

Venezuelan footballer (1938–2019)

Personal information
- Date of birth: 26 May 1938
- Date of death: 24 July 2019 (aged 81)
- Position: Defender

International career
Years	Team	Apps	(Gls)
1967	Venezuela	2	(0)

José Vidal (26 May 1938 – 24 July 2019) was a Venezuelan footballer. He played in two matches for the Venezuela national football team in 1967. He was also part of Venezuela's squad for the 1967 South American Championship.
