= Abayubá Ibáñez =

Uruguayan footballer (died 2021)

Personal information
- Date of death: 19 January 2021
- Position: Midfielder

Senior career*
Years	Team	Apps	(Gls)
1962–1968	Defensor Sporting		
1969	Newell's Old Boys		
1970–1972	Liverpool Montevideo		
1972–1974	Atletico Español		
1974–1975	Huracán Buceo		

International career
1967–1971	Uruguay	13	(0)
Medal record
Men's football
Representing Uruguay
South American Championship
Winner	1967 Uruguay
- * Club domestic league appearances and goals

Abayubá Ibáñez (died 19 January 2021) was a Uruguayan footballer who played as a midfielder. He was part of Uruguay squad that won the 1967 South American Championship on home soil.

== Club career ==
Ibáñez started his career in 1962 at Defensor Sporting. Then he played for Argentinian side Newell's Old Boys for one year in 1969. He went back home playing for Liverpool Montevideo from 1970 to 1972. Then he played for Mexican side Atletico Español from 1972 to 1974. He ended his career in Montevideo playing for Huracán Buceo in 1974-1975

== International career ==
Ibáñez earned his first cap on 25 April 1964 against Morocco. He was named in Uruguay’s squad for the 1967 South American Championship, but was an unused substitute as Uruguay won the competition on home soil. Ibáñez got his 13th and last cap on 18 July 1971 against Argentina.
