= Mario Zabalaga =

Bolivian footballer (1938–2008)

Personal information
- Date of birth: 8 May 1938
- Place of birth: Cochabamba, Bolivia
- Date of death: 13 December 2008 (aged 70)
- Position: Defender

Senior career*
Years	Team	Apps	(Gls)
1958-1961	Jorge Wilstermann		
1961	Always Ready		
1962-1963	Jorge Wilstermann		
1964	Aurora		
1965-1973	Jorge Wilstermann		

International career
1961-1967	Bolivia	11	(0)
Medal record
Representing Bolivia
Copa América
Winner	1963 Bolivia
- * Club domestic league appearances and goals

Mario Zabalaga (8 May 1938 – 13 December 2008) was a Bolivian footballer He was part of Bolivia's squad that won the 1963 South American Championship on home soil.

== International career ==
Zabalaga got his first cap with Bolivia on 15 July 1961 against Uruguay for the 1st leg of the 1962 FIFA World Cup qualification. He also play the 2nd leg on 30 July, also against Uruguay.

He was selected in Bolivia's squad for the 1963 South American Championship, playing only one game against Paraguay on 24 March as Bolivia won the tournament, its first and only Copa America.

In July and August 1965, he played three 1966 FIFA World Cup qualification games, two against Paraguay and one against Argentina.

Zabalaga was in Bolivia's squad for the 1967 South American Championship and played 5 games during the tournament. The game against Chile on 1 February was his 11th and last cap with Bolivia.
