= David Mota (footballer) =

Venezuelan footballer (1942-2015)

Personal information
- Date of birth: 16 February 1942
- Date of death: 1 February 2015 (aged 72)
- Position: Defender

International career
Years	Team	Apps	(Gls)
1967–1969	Venezuela	7	(0)

David Mota (16 February 1942 – 1 February 2015) was a Venezuelan footballer. He played in seven matches for the Venezuela national football team from 1967 to 1969. He was also part of Venezuela's squad for the 1967 South American Championship.
