= Francisco Miranda =

Francisco Miranda may refer to:

- Francisco de Sá de Miranda, (1485–1558), Portuguese poet
- Francisco de Miranda, (1750–1816), Spanish-American revolutionist
- Francisco Miranda Concha, (1869–1950), Spanish trade union leader
- Francisco Palacios Miranda, Governor and Military Commandant of the Baja California Territory 1844–1847
- Francisco Miranda (footballer), Paraguayan footballer
