= Jorge Acuña (Uruguayan footballer) =

Uruguayan footballer

Personal information
- Date of death: 26 February 2024
- Position: Forward

Senior career*
Years	Team	Apps	(Gls)
1967	Sud América		
1968	Peñarol		
1971–1972	Politécnico		

International career
1967–1971	Uruguay	5	(0)
Medal record
Men's football
Representing Uruguay
South American Championship
Winner	1967 Uruguay
- * Club domestic league appearances and goals

Jorge Antonio Acuña Antúnez (died 26 February 2024) was a Uruguayan footballer who played as a forward. He was part of Uruguay squad that won the 1967 South American Championship on home soil.

== Club career ==
Acuña played for Sud América in 1967, Peñarol in 1968, and Politécnico in 1971–1972.

== International career ==
Acuña made his international debut on 15 May 1966 playing against Paraguay.

The following year, he was a member of Uruguay’s squad that won the 1967 South American Championship on home soil. He played only one game in the tournament, Uruguay’s second match against Venezuela, coming on as a substitute in the 82nd minute.

Acuña's fifth and final appearance was on 30 July 1967 against Peru.
