= Miguel Ángel Bazzano =

Uruguayan footballer (born 1945)

Miguel Angel Bazzano
Personal information
- Full name: Miguel Angel Daniel Bazzano Vázquez
- Date of birth: 22 November 1945 (age 80)
- Position: Goalkeeper

Youth career
- Danubio: –1964

Senior career*
Years	Team	Apps	(Gls)
1964–1968	Danubio		
1969	Club Nacional de Football		
1969–1970	Racing Club de Montevideo		
1970	CA Cerro		
1971–1972	C.D. Politécnico		
1972–1973	Huracán Buceo		
1973–1974	Deportivo Galicia		

International career
1967–1968	Uruguay	8	(0)
Medal record
Men's football
Representing Uruguay
South American Championship
Winner	1967 Uruguay
- * Club domestic league appearances and goals

Miguel Angel Bazzano (born 22 November 1945) is a former Uruguayan footballer who played as a goalkeeper. He was part of Uruguay squad that won the 1967 South American Championship on home soil.

== Club career ==
He begin his career in Danubio from 1964 to 1968. Then he successively played for Club Nacional de Football in 1969, Racing Club de Montevideo in 1969–1970, CA Cerro in 1970, C.D. Politécnico in 1971–1972, Huracan Buceo in 1972–1973 and Deportivo Galicia in 1973–1974.

== International career ==
Bazzano earned his first cap on 04/01/1967 against Romania, when he replaced Jacinto Callero for the second half.

Then he was named in Uruguay squad for the 1967 South American Championship that started on their home soil thirteen days later.

He played Uruguay's first three games in the tournament. However, Ladislao Mazurkiewicz played the two following games including the last decisive game against Argentina which enabled Uruguay to win the competition.

His eighth and last cap was on 19/06/1968 against Argentina.
