= José Zarzalejo =

Venezuelan footballer (1942–2017)

José Luis Zarzalejo
Personal information
- Full name: José Luis Zarzalejo Soto
- Date of birth: 7 November 1942
- Place of birth: Maturín, Monagas, United States of Venezuela
- Date of death: 3 March 2017 (aged 74)
- Place of death: Caracas, Venezuela
- Position: Defender

Senior career*
Years	Team	Apps	(Gls)
- Dos Caminos
- Litoral S.C.
1965	La Salle		
1967	Nacional FC		
1968	Portugués		
- Aragua FC

International career
1965-1969	Venezuela	11	(0)
- * Club domestic league appearances and goals

José Luis Zarzalejo (7 November 1942 – 3 March 2017) was a Venezuelan footballer. He was part of Venezuela's squad for the 1967 South American Championship. Zarzalejo died in Caracas on 3 March 2017, at the age of 74.
