= 1972 Liga Deportiva Universitaria de Quito season =

L.D.U. Quito
1972 season
- President: Víctor Rosero
- Manager: Ondino Viera; Jorge Araque
- Stadium: Estadio Olímpico Atahualpa
- Serie A: 7th
Home colours	Away colours

Liga Deportiva Universitaria de Quito's 1972 season was the club's 42nd year of existence, the 19th year in professional football and the 13th in the top level of professional football in Ecuador.

== Competitions ==
=== Serie A ===
==== First stage ====
Pos	Team	Pld	W	D	L	GF	GA	GD	Pts	Qualification or relegation
4	Macará	14	5	4	5	24	25	−1	14	
5	América de Quito	14	4	5	5	15	17	−2	13	
6	LDU Quito	14	4	5	5	18	23	−5	13	
7	Universidad Católica	14	5	2	7	17	18	−1	12	Relegated to the Serie B
8	Olmedo	14	2	4	8	20	39	−19	8	Relegated to the Serie B

Source: RSSSF - 1972 Serie A

===== Results =====
Home \ Away	CDA	BSC	EN	CSE	LDQ	MAC	CDO	UC
América de Quito					1–0			
Barcelona					3–0			
El Nacional					3–1			
Emelec					1–1			
L.D.U. Quito	1–1	2–2	1–4	1–1		3–2	3–1	3–2
Macará					0–1			
Olmedo					1–1			
Universidad Católica					1–0			

Source: RSSSF
Legend: Blue = home team win; Yellow = draw; Red = away team win.

==== Second stage ====
Pos	Team	Pld	W	D	L	GF	GA	GD	Pts	Qualification or relegation
4	El Nacional	14	5	4	5	14	16	−2	14	
5	LDU Portoviejo	14	3	6	5	18	19	−1	12	
6	América de Quito	14	4	3	7	13	18	−5	11	
7	LDU Quito	14	3	5	6	18	24	−6	11	Qualified to the Relegation play-off
8	Macará	14	3	4	7	14	25	−11	10	

Source: RSSSF - 1972 Serie A

===== Results =====
Home \ Away	CDA	BSC	SDQ	EN	CSE	LDP	LDQ	MAC
América de Quito							2–4	
Barcelona							2–0	
Deportivo Quito							2–2	
El Nacional							1–0	
Emelec							2–0	
L.D.U. Portoviejo							1–1	
L.D.U. Quito	0–2	0–1	3–3	2–1	1–3	4–3		0–0
Macará							1–1	

Source: RSSSF
Legend: Blue = home team win; Yellow = draw; Red = away team win.

==== Relegation play-off ====
Pos	Team	Pld	W	D	L	GF	GA	GD	Pts	Promotion or relegation
1	Universidad Católica	3	2	1	0	5	2	+3	5	Promoted to the 1973 Serie A
2	LDU Quito	3	0	1	2	2	5	−3	1	Relegated to the Segunda Categoría

Source: RSSSF - 1972 Serie A

===== Results =====
January 14, 1973	Universidad Católica	2–0	L.D.U. Quito	Quito, Ecuador
11:00 UTC−05:00	Cabaleiro 21'; Vera 53'			Stadium: Estadio Olímpico Atahualpa; Attendance: 12,000; Referee: Humberto de la Casa

January 19, 1973	L.D.U. Quito	1–1	Universidad Católica	Quito, Ecuador
20:00 UTC−05:00	Zambrano 30' (o.g.)		Vera 24'	Stadium: Estadio Olímpico Atahualpa; Attendance: 6,000; Referee: Alberto Martínez

January 28, 1973	L.D.U. Quito	1–2	Universidad Católica	Quito, Ecuador
11:00 UTC−05:00	Zubía 5'		Vera 56'; Mantilla 81'	Stadium: Estadio Olímpico Atahualpa; Attendance: 13,000
