= Eduardo Herrera (Chilean footballer) =

Chilean footballer (born 1944)

Personal information
- Date of birth: 25 August 1944 (age 82)

International career
Years	Team	Apps	(Gls)
1967–1973	Chile	21	(0)

Eduardo Herrera (born 25 August 1944) is a Chilean footballer. He played in 21 matches for the Chile national football team from 1967 to 1973. He was also part of Chile's squad for the 1967 South American Championship.
