= Jorge Oyarbide =

Uruguayan footballer (1944–2013)

Personal information
- Date of birth: 6 July 1944
- Date of death: 14 November 2013 (aged 69)
- Position: Midfielder

International career
Years	Team	Apps	(Gls)
1961–1967	Uruguay	7	(4)
Medal record
Representing Uruguay
South American Championship
Winner	1967 Uruguay

Jorge Oyarbide (6 July 1944 – 14 November 2013) was a Uruguayan footballer. He played seven matches and scored four goals for the Uruguay national team from 1961 to 1967. He was also part of Uruguay's 1967 South American Championship winning squad.

== Career statistics ==
=== International ===
Appearances and goals by national team and year
National team	Year	Apps	Goals
Uruguay	1961	1	0
Uruguay	1967	6	4
Total		7	4

Scores and results list Uruguay's goal tally first, score column indicates score after each Oyarbide goal.

List of international goals scored by Jorge Oyarbide
No.	Date	Venue	Opponent	Score	Result	Competition
1	17 January 1967	Estadio Centenario, Montevideo, Uruguay	Bolivia	4–0	4–0	1967 South American Championship
2	21 January 1967	Estadio Centenario, Montevideo, Uruguay	Venezuela	2–0	4–0	1967 South American Championship
3	21 January 1967	Estadio Centenario, Montevideo, Uruguay	Venezuela	3–0	4–0	1967 South American Championship
4	26 January 1967	Estadio Centenario, Montevideo, Uruguay	Chile	2–2	2–2	1967 South American Championship

== Honours ==
Uruguay

- South American Championship: 1967
