= José Issa =

Bolivian footballer (born 1942)

Personal information
- Date of birth: 28 May 1942 (age 84)
- Place of birth: Cochabamba, Bolivia
- Position: Goalkeeper

Senior career*
Years	Team	Apps	(Gls)
- Club Aurora
- Jorge Wilstermann

International career
1967	Bolivia	4	(0)
- * Club domestic league appearances and goals

José Issa (born 28 May 1942) is a Bolivian footballer. He played in four matches for the Bolivia national football team in 1967. He was also part of Bolivia's squad for the 1967 South American Championship.
