= Artemio Villanueva =

Paraguayan footballer (1945-2010)

Personal information
- Full name: Artemio Gualberto Villanueva Paolisso
- Date of birth: 9 November 1945
- Date of death: 2 August 2010 (aged 64)

International career
| Years | Team | Apps | (Gls) |
| 1966–1971 | Paraguay | 15 | (0) |

Artemio Gualberto Villanueva Paolisso (9 November 1945 – 2 August 2010) was a Paraguayan footballer. He played in 15 matches for the Paraguay national football team from 1966 to 1971. He was also part of Paraguay's squad for the 1967 South American Championship.
