= Adolfo Flores =

Bolivian footballer (born 1942)

Personal information
- Date of birth: 12 February 1942 (age 84)
- Position: Midfielder

International career
Years	Team	Apps	(Gls)
1965-1967	Bolivia	3	(0)

Adolfo Flores (born 12 February 1942) is a Bolivian footballer. He was part of Bolivia's squad for the 1967 South American Championship.
