= Wilfrido Garay =

Paraguayan footballer (1943-2015)

Personal information
- Date of birth: 18 July 1943
- Place of birth: Puerto Rosario, Paraguay
- Date of death: 24 January 2015 (aged 71)

International career
Years	Team	Apps	(Gls)
1967	Paraguay	1	(0)

Wilfrido Garay (18 July 1943 – 24 January 2015) was a Paraguayan footballer. He played in one match for the Paraguay national football team in 1967. He was also part of Paraguay's squad for the 1967 South American Championship.
