= Griseldo Cobo =

Bolivian footballer (1938–?)

Personal information
- Full name: Griseldo Salvatierra Cobo
- Date of birth: 27 January 1938
- Date of death: date of death unknown

International career
| Years | Team | Apps | (Gls) |
| 1961–1973 | Bolivia | 11 | (0) |

Griseldo Cobo (born 27 January 1938 – date of death unknown) was a Bolivian footballer. He was part of Bolivia's squad for the 1967 South American Championship. He is deceased.
