= Rómulo Cortez =

Bolivian footballer and coach (1942–2026)

Personal information
- Full name: Rómulo Cortez Gonzales
- Date of birth: 1942
- Place of birth: Bolivia
- Date of death: 4 August 2026 (aged 84)
- Position: Forward

Senior career*
Years	Team	Apps	(Gls)
- C.D. Jorge Wilstermann
- Club Always Ready
- Club Unión Maestranza
- Washington Darts

International career
1967	Bolivia	1	(0)

Managerial career
- Team in the United Arab Emirates
- 1996–1997: Maldives
- 2011–20??: Real Cochabamba Academy (technical director/youth coach)
- * Club domestic league appearances and goals

Rómulo Cortez (1942 – 4 August 2026) was a Bolivian football coach and player. Starting professional football at 17 with C.D. Jorge Wilstermann of the domestic league, he took part in first-ever Copa Libertadores, the premier club tournament for South American countries. He played his only game with Bolivia during the 1967 South American Championship.

Cortez was joint top scorer in the 1968 American Soccer League with 10 goals for the Washington Darts, sharing the honor with teammate Gerry Brown.

Cortez died on 4 August 2026, at the age of 84.

== Coaching career ==
Plying his trade abroad in Germany and North America (for the Washington Darts), Cortez began to develop an interest in coaching, doing courses in Mexico and Brazil as well as training in Spain, getting a master's degree in sports science in Germany. Later, the former footballer coached a host of clubs, including top teams in the United Arab Emirates where he won individual awards.

Managing the Maldives national team on their 1998 FIFA World Cup qualification campaign, Cortez led his charges to a poor run of results, losing 17–0 to Iran in the first round, 12–0 to Syria twice in the second and fourth rounds, and 9–0 to Iran again in the fifth. Including 3-0 and 6–0 defeats to Kyrgyzstan in the third and sixth rounds, the combined scoreline in their campaign was 59 goals conceded. In response, the Bolivian stated that half his players wanted to quit following the first fixture as they were timorous about possible traducement from their supporters back home and said that the situation was unfair.

Hired by the Real Cochabamba Football Academy board to become their technical director and manage their under-15 and under-17 squads, Cortez also was instructed to use his experience to teach their coaches in 2011.

Expatiating and dilating on the state of Bolivian football, Cortez explained that it requires fundamental knowledge of the game, both technically and tactically but lacks professionals and that 95 percent of coaches are former players.

Back in 2014, the former coach proposed a project for the restructuring of Bolivian football, which included ideas for a unified amateur second division and a creation of a coaching school; he also specified that the Bolivian Football Federation should be the only body responsible for managing the national football team.
