= Benigno Apodaca =

Paraguayan footballer (1939–2020)

Personal information
- Full name: Benigno Apocada Giménez
- Date of birth: 16 April 1939
- Place of birth: San Solano, Paraguay
- Date of death: 4 November 2020 (aged 81)
- Place of death: Asunción, Paraguay
- Position: Midfielder

Senior career*
Years	Team	Apps	(Gls)
- Sportivo San Pedro
1956	Pettirossi		
1957	Guaraní		
1958–1963	Libertad		
1964–1967	Olimpia		
1968	Unión Española	11	(1)
1969	Guaraní		
1970	Sportivo Luqueño		
1970–1972	UES		

International career
1962–1967	Paraguay	13	(1)
- * Club domestic league appearances and goals

Benigno Apodaca Giménez (16 April 1939 - 4 November 2020) was a Paraguayan footballer. He was part of Paraguay's squad for the 1967 South American Championship.

== Teams ==
- (Paraguay) Sportivo San Pedro
- (Paraguay) Pettirossi 1956
- (Paraguay) Guaraní 1957
- (Paraguay) Libertad 1958–1963
- (Paraguay) Olimpia 1964–1967
- (Chile) Unión Española 1968
- (Paraguay) Guaraní 1969
- (Paraguay) Sportivo Luqueño 1970
- (El Salvador) UES 1970–1972

== International ==
- Paraguay 1962–1967
