= Jacinto Callero =

Uruguayan footballer (born 1945)

Personal information
- Date of birth: 13 February 1945 (age 81)
- Position: Goalkeeper

Senior career*
Years	Team	Apps	(Gls)
1960–1966	Club Nacional de Football		
1967–1972	Rampla Juniors		
1973–1977	Defensor Sporting		

International career
1967	Uruguay	1	(0)
Medal record
Men's football
Representing Uruguay
South American Championship
Winner	1967 Uruguay
- * Club domestic league appearances and goals

Jacinto Callero (born 13 February 1945) is a former Uruguayan footballer who played as a goalkeeper. He was part of Uruguay squad that won the 1967 South American Championship on home soil.

== Club career ==
Callero started his career in 1960 at Club Nacional de Football. Then in 1967 he went to Rampla Juniors. In 1973 he went to Defensor Sporting where he finished his career in 1977.

== International career ==
Callero earned his first and only cap on 4 January 1967 against Romania. He only played the first half as he was substituted by Miguel Ángel Bazzano at halftime.

Then he was named in Uruguay's squad for the 1967 South American Championship that started on their home soil 13 days later. However, he was an unused substitute as Uruguay won the competition.
