= Carlos Martínez (Uruguayan footballer) =

Uruguayan footballer (1940-2015)

Personal information
- Date of birth: 30 September 1940
- Date of death: 14 November 2015 (aged 75)
- Position: Defender

International career
Years	Team	Apps	(Gls)
1967	Uruguay	2	(0)

Carlos Martínez (30 September 1940 – 14 November 2015) was a Uruguayan footballer. He played in two matches for the Uruguay national football team in 1967. He was also part of Uruguay's squad for the 1967 South American Championship.
