= Julio Gallardo (footballer) =

Chilean footballer (1942–1991)

Personal information
- Date of birth: 16 June 1942
- Place of birth: Villarrica, Chile
- Date of death: 21 June 1991 (aged 49)

International career
Years	Team	Apps	(Gls)
1967–1969	Chile	9	(3)

Julio Gallardo (16 June 1942 – 21 June 1991) was a Chilean footballer. He played in nine matches for the Chile national football team from 1967 to 1969. He was also part of Chile's squad for the 1967 South American Championship.
