= Humberto Scovino =

Venezuelan footballer (1942–2019)

Personal information
- Date of birth: 20 December 1942
- Place of birth: Puerto Cabello, Venezuela
- Date of death: 15 October 2019 (aged 76)
- Place of death: Valencia, Venezuela
- Position: Forward

Senior career*
| Years | Team | Apps | (Gls) |
- Valencia
- Tiquire Flores

International career
| 1965-1967 | Venezuela | 5 | (3) |
- * Club domestic league appearances and goals

Humberto Scovino (20 December 1942 – 15 October 2019) was a Venezuelan footballer. He was part of Venezuela's squad for the 1967 South American Championship, scoring its first goal ever in the competition. Scovino died on 15 October 2019, at the age of 76.
