= Héctor Cincunegui =

Uruguayan footballer (born 1940)

Personal information
- Date of birth: 28 July 1940
- Date of death: 13 October 2016 (aged 76)
- Position: Defender

International career
Years	Team	Apps	(Gls)
1964–1967	Uruguay	8	(0)

Héctor Cincunegui (28 July 1940 – 13 October 2016) was a Uruguayan footballer. He played in eight matches for the Uruguay national football team from 1964 to 1967. He was also part of Uruguay's squad for the 1967 South American Championship.
