= Gumercindo Yudis =

Paraguayan footballer (1944-2015)

Personal information
- Date of birth: 13 January 1944
- Place of birth: Areguá, Paraguay
- Date of death: 17 June 2015 (aged 71)

International career
Years	Team	Apps	(Gls)
1967	Paraguay	3	(0)

Gumercindo Yudis (13 January 1944 – 17 June 2015) was a Paraguayan footballer. He played in three matches for the Paraguay national football team in 1967. He was also part of Paraguay's squad for the 1967 South American Championship.
