= Julio Gallardo =

Mexican basketball player (1958–2011)

Julio Gallardo (June 26, 1958 – February 9, 2011) was a Mexican-American basketball player. He represented Mexico at the 1983 Pan American Games, held at Caracas, Venezuela.

== Early life ==
Gallardo was born in El Paso, Texas to Mexican parents.

== Professional career ==
Gallardo played for a local professional team in Hermosillo from 1976 to 1982. In 1984, he joined the Baloncesto Superior Nacional Mayaguez Tainos in Mayaguez, Puerto Rico, becoming an all star in that league. He played with the Tainos until 1989, when they moved to city of Cabo Rojo.

== Personal ==
Gallardo was the son of David and Maria Estela Gallardo. He studied at Ysleta High School, where he played basketball.
