= Rafael Santana (footballer) =

Venezuelan footballer (born 1944)

Personal information
- Full name: Rafael Santana Fontes
- Date of birth: 1 December 1944 (age 81)
- Place of birth: Santa Cruz de Tenerife, Spain
- Position: Midfielder

International career
Years	Team	Apps	(Gls)
1967–1979	Venezuela	8	(3)

Rafael Santana Fontes (born 1 December 1944) is a Venezuelan footballer. He played in eight matches for the Venezuela national football team from 1967 to 1979. He was also part of Venezuela's squad for the 1967 South American Championship.
