= César Cabrera =

Paraguayan footballer (1938–2005)

Personal information
- Full name: César Cabrera Santacruz
- Date of birth: 30 March 1938
- Place of birth: Piribebuy, Paraguay
- Date of death: 11 February 2005 (aged 66)
- Place of death: Vitoria, Basque Country, Spain
- Position: Forward

Senior career*
Years	Team	Apps	(Gls)
1955-1959	Independiente Piribebuy		
1959-1963	Nacional Asunción		
1963-1966	Córdoba	82	(21)
1966-1967	Málaga	11	(3)
1967-1968	Tenerife	13	(1)
1968-1969	Málaga	1	(0)

International career
1960-1963	Paraguay	9	(4)
- * Club domestic league appearances and goals

César Cabrera (30 March 1938 – 11 February 2005) was a Paraguayan footballer. He was part of Paraguay's squad for the 1963 South American Championship. Cabrera died on 11 February 2005, at the age of 66.
