= Carlos Diarte =

Paraguayan footballer and coach (1954–2011)

Personal information
- Full name: Carlos Martínez Diarte
- Date of birth: 26 January 1954
- Place of birth: Asunción, Paraguay
- Date of death: 29 June 2011 (aged 57)
- Position: Striker

Youth career
- 1967–1971: Olimpia

Senior career*
Years	Team	Apps	(Gls)
1971–1973	Olimpia	?	(?)
1973–1976	Zaragoza	66	(31)
1977–1979	Valencia	71	(18)
1979–1980	Salamanca	31	(7)
1980–1983	Betis	75	(29)
1983–1986	Saint-Étienne	?	(?)
1987	Olimpia	?	(?)

International career
	Paraguay	45	(?)

Managerial career
- Deportivo Alginet
- 1996–1997: Atlético B
- 1999: Salamanca
- 2002: Gimnàstic
- 2003: Guaraní
- 2006: Colegiales
- 2008: Gimnàstic
- 2009–2010: Equatorial Guinea
- * Club domestic league appearances and goals

Carlos Martínez Diarte (26 January 1954 – 29 June 2011), better known as Lobo, was a Paraguayan football striker and coach.

== Career ==
=== As player ===
Diarte started his career in Olimpia Asunción and at the age of 16 he made his debut in the professional squad, helping Olimpia win the Paraguayan championship in 1971. His speed and goal-scoring skills were soon noticed by teams all around Europe, and in 1973 he signed for Real Zaragoza of Spain where he was part of the famous "Zaraguayos" group (a reference to the Paraguayan stars such as Saturnino Arrua and Felipe Ocampos that were playing for Zaragoza at that time). In 1976, Diarte signed for Valencia CF where he would be part of a formidable attacking line along with Mario Kempes and Johnny Rep. Diarte also played for UD Salamanca (from 1979 to 1980), Real Betis (from 1980 to 1983 where he scored 29 goals in 75 La Liga games) and AS Saint-Étienne of France (from 1983 to 1985).

In 1987, he returned to Olimpia Asunción to retire. In that year, he helped the team win the Paraguayan championship. Diarte was also part of the Paraguay national football team for several years.

=== As coach ===
Once Diarte retired as a footballer he became a coach and managed several teams including Valencia CF (1988), Deportivo Alginet, Atlético Madrid B (1997–1998), UD Salamanca (1998–1999) and Gimnàstic de Tarragona (2002) all from Spain; Atl. Colegiales, Guaraní and Olimpia (as assistant coach) from Paraguay. He also managed the Equatorial Guinea national football team before being diagnosed with cancer.

== Death ==
Diarte died of cancer on 29 June 2011.

== Titles ==
Season	Team	Title
1971	Olimpia	Paraguayan 1st division
1979	Valencia CF	Copa del Rey
1973	Olimpia	Paraguayan 1st division
