= Francisco Miranda (footballer) =

Paraguayan footballer (born 1941)

Personal information
- Date of birth: 21 August 1941 (age 85)
- Place of birth: Caraguatay, Paraguay
- Height: 1.68 m (5 ft 6 in)
- Position: Midfielder

International career
Years	Team	Apps	(Gls)
1966–1967	Paraguay	8	(0)

Francisco Miranda (born 21 August 1941) is a Paraguayan footballer. He played in eight matches for the Paraguay national football team from 1966 to 1967. He was also part of Paraguay's squad for the 1967 South American Championship.
