= Saturnino Arrúa =

Paraguayan footballer and coach (born 1949)

Personal information
- Full name: Saturnino Arrúa Molinas
- Date of birth: 7 April 1949 (age 77)
- Place of birth: Itá, Paraguay
- Position: Attacking midfielder

Youth career
- San Rafael

Senior career*
Years	Team	Apps	(Gls)
1963	Sportivo Iteño		
1964–1973	Cerro Porteño		
1973–1979	Real Zaragoza	147	(71)
1979–1981	Cerro Porteño		
1981–1982	América de Cali	14	(4)

International career
1969–1980	Paraguay	27	(13)
- * Club domestic league appearances and goals

Saturnino 'Nino' Arrúa Molinas (born 7 April 1949) is a Paraguayan retired footballer who played as an attacking midfielder, and a current coach.

Considered one of the greatest footballers to ever come out of his nation, his 22-year professional career was closely associated with Cerro Porteño and Real Zaragoza.

== Club career ==
Born in Itá near Asunción, Arrúa made his senior debuts at only 14, with local Sportivo Iteño. He was signed shortly after by Cerro Porteño, going on to win four national championships four times during his spell as well as being crowned the league's top scorer on three occasions.

In 1973 Arrúa moved to Spain and joined Real Zaragoza, remaining six seasons with the club, five of them in La Liga. He scored 17 goals in only 26 games in his first campaign for a final third-place and, during parts of his stint in Aragon, formed an efficient attacking partnership with countrymen Carlos Diarte and Felipe Ocampos which was dubbed Zaraguayos.

From 1979 until his retirement six years later Arrúa played mainly with former side Cerro Porteño – this was interspersed with a spell in Colombia with América de Cali. Subsequently, he worked as a manager, with Club 12 de Octubre, Club Atlético 3 de Febrero and Cerro.

== International career ==
Arrúa gained 27 caps for Paraguay between 1969 and 1980, scoring 13 goals.
