= Luis Carlos Mendoza =

Venezuelan footballer (born 1970)

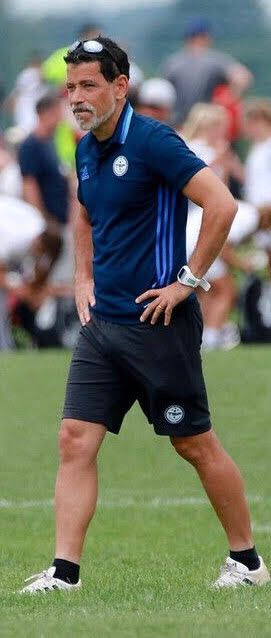

Personal information
- Full name: Luis Carlos Mendoza Burgos
- Date of birth: 27 March 1970 (age 56)
- Place of birth: Caracas, Venezuela
- Position: Midfielder

Team information
- Current team: Weston FC (technical director)

Youth career
- 1975–1981: Colegio Santo Tomás de Aquino
- 1981–1983: Pineto Calcio

Senior career*
Years	Team	Apps	(Gls)
1986–1996	Caracas		
1986–1988	→ Pepeganga (loan)		
1997–2002	New Jersey Stallions	47+	(14)

Managerial career
- 2000–2003: New Jersey Stallions
- 2019–: Weston FC (technical director)
- * Club domestic league appearances and goals

Luis Carlos Mendoza Burgos (born 27 March 1970) is a Venezuelan professional football manager and former player who is a technical director for USL League Two club Weston FC.

== Early life ==
Born in Caracas, Venezuela, Mendoza attended the Colegio Santo Tomás de Aquino between 1975 and 1981, playing youth football for the school. Between 1981 and 1983, Mendoza played youth football in Italy for Pineto Calcio.

== Playing career ==
Mendoza represented Venezuela National team 1988 Suramericano Juvenil, represented Venezuela National team 1992 Preolimpics Paraguay, represented Caracas at the 1993 Copa CONMEBOL in two games, and at the 1995 Copa Libertadores in six games. He also played for the New Jersey Stallions in the United States, scoring 14 goals in the USL League Two between 1997 and 2002.

== Managerial career ==
Between 2000 and 2003, Mendoza coached the New Jersey Stallions. After having been the director of coaching of New Jersey–based youth academy TSF Academy, Mendoza was appointed technical director of Weston FC's youth setup on 2 July 2019.

== Personal life ==
Mendoza is the son of Luis Alfredo Mendoza, a former professional footballer.
