= Carlos Báez (footballer, born 1953) =

Paraguayan footballer

Personal information
- Full name: Carlos José Báez Vargas
- Date of birth: 1 November 1953 (age 72)
- Place of birth: Asunción, Paraguay
- Position: Forward

International career
Years	Team	Apps	(Gls)
1974–1977	Paraguay	7	(2)

Carlos José Báez (born 1 November 1953) is a Paraguayan footballer. He played in seven matches for the Paraguay national football team from 1974 to 1977. He was also part of Paraguay's squad for the 1975 Copa América tournament.
