= Severiano Irala =

Paraguayan footballer (died 2012)

Severiano Irala Núñez (died 12 March 2012) was a Paraguayan footballer who played as a forward. He represented Cerro Porteño and Club Olimpia in his native country, Greek club Panathinaikos, and Mexican side Deportivo Toluca. He also played for the Paraguay national team from 1968 to 1972, making seven appearances and scoring three goals.

== Career ==
Nicknamed "El Taladro" (English: "the drill") for his ability to pierce defences, Irala won the Paraguayan Primera División with Cerro Porteño in 1970, 1972, 1973, and 1974.

== Death ==
Irala died on 12 March 2012.

== Honours ==
Cerro Porteño

- Paraguayan Primera División: 1970, 1972, 1973, and 1974
