= Juan Ayala =

Paraguayan footballer (born 1942)

Personal information
- Full name: Juan Pelayo Ayala Cáceres
- Date of birth: 26 June 1942 (age 84)
- Place of birth: Villa Hayes, Paraguay
- Position: Forward

Senior career*
Years	Team	Apps	(Gls)
- Benjamín Aceval
1961–1968	Libertad		
1968–1969	Antofagasta Portuario		
1969	Lota Schwager	12	
1972	Always Ready		
1973	Ingenieros de Oruro		
1974	Oruro Royal		

International career
1963	Paraguay	5	(1)
- * Club domestic league appearances and goals

Juan Pelayo Ayala Cáceres (born 1942) is a Paraguayan former footballer who played as a forward for clubs in Paraguay, Chile, Bolivia and Venezuela. He played in five matches for the Paraguay national football team in 1963. He was also part of Paraguay's squad for the 1963 South American Championship.

== Career ==
Born in Villa Hayes, Paraguay, Ayala started his career with Benjamín Aceval before playing for Libertad from 1961 to 1968.

After Libertad, Ayala moved to Chile and got two consecutive league titles of the Segunda División with Antofagasta Portuario and Lota Schwager in 1968 and 1969, respectively. He became an idol for Deportes Antofagasta.

From 1972 and 1974, Ayala played in Bolivia for Always Ready, Ingenieros de Oruro and Oruro Royal. He ended his career playing in Venezuela.

== Personal life ==
After his retirement, Ayala lived for 25 years in Venezuela before settling in Antofagasta, Chile.

Ayala is the godfather of the former Paraguayan international goalkeeper Ricardo Tavarelli.
