= Luis Mendoza (footballer, born 1945) =

Venezuelan footballer (1945–2024)

Personal information
- Full name: Luis Alfredo Mendoza Benedetto
- Date of birth: 21 June 1945
- Place of birth: Caracas, Venezuela
- Date of death: 29 April 2024 (aged 78)
- Place of death: Venezuela
- Position: Midfielder

Senior career*
Years	Team	Apps	(Gls)
- Deportivo Italia
- Deportivo Galicia
- Portuguesa
- Deportivo Galicia

International career
1967–1979	Venezuela	15	(1)

Managerial career
- 1982: Mineros de Guayana
- * Club domestic league appearances and goals

Luis Alfredo Mendoza Benedetto (21 June 1945 – 29 April 2024) was a Venezuelan footballer who played as a midfielder. He played 15 matches for the Venezuela national team from 1967 to 1979. He was also part of Venezuela's squad for the 1967 South American Championship. Mendoza died on 29 April 2024, at the age of 78.
