= Arístides del Puerto =

Paraguayan footballer (born 1947)

Personal information
- Date of birth: 17 January 1947 (age 79)

International career
Years	Team	Apps	(Gls)
1966–1971	Paraguay	15	(2)

Arístides del Puerto (born 17 January 1947) is a Paraguayan footballer. He played in 15 matches for the Paraguay national football team from 1966 to 1971. He was also part of Paraguay's squad for the 1967 South American Championship.
