= Luis Vera (Uruguayan footballer) =

Uruguayan footballer (1943–2020)

Personal information
- Full name: Luis Alberto Vera Díaz
- Date of birth: 1 November 1943
- Place of birth: Artigas, Uruguay
- Date of death: August 2020 (aged 76)
- Position: Forward

International career
Years	Team	Apps	(Gls)
1967	Uruguay	6	(0)

Luis Alberto Vera Díaz (1 November 1943 – August 2020) ws a Uruguayan footballer who played as a forward. He played in six matches for the Uruguay national football team in 1967. He was also part of Uruguay's squad for the 1967 South American Championship.

Vera died in August 2020, at the age of 76.
