= Juan Rojas (Paraguayan footballer) =

Paraguayan footballer (1945–1984)

Personal information
- Full name: Juan Carlos Rojas Díaz
- Date of birth: 17 December 1945
- Place of birth: Asunción, Paraguay
- Date of death: 6 August 1984 (aged 38)
- Place of death: Spain
- Height: 1.67 m (5 ft 6 in)
- Position: Midfielder

Senior career*
Years	Team	Apps	(Gls)
1963-1968	Cerro Porteño		
1968–1973	Córdoba	118	(13)
1973–1976	Xerez		

International career
1965–1967	Paraguay	17	(5)
- * Club domestic league appearances and goals

Juan Carlos Rojas Díaz (17 December 1945 – 8 June 1984) was a Paraguayan footballer who played as a midfielder. He appeared in 17 matches for the Paraguay national team from 1965 to 1967. He was also part of Paraguay's squad for the 1967 South American Championship. Rojas died on 8 June 1984, at the age of 38.
