= Juan Riveros =

Paraguayan footballer (born 1946)

Personal information
- Full name: Juan Francisco Riveros Santos
- Date of birth: 16 May 1946 (age 80)
- Place of birth: Asunción, Paraguay

International career
Years	Team	Apps	(Gls)
1966–1967	Paraguay	4	(1)

Juan Francisco Riveros Santos (born 16 May 1946) is a Paraguayan footballer. He played in four matches for the Paraguay national football team from 1966 to 1967. He was also part of Paraguay's squad for the 1967 South American Championship.
