= Antonio González (footballer) =

Paraguayan footballer (born 1936)

Personal information
- Date of birth: 3 May 1936 (age 90)

International career
Years	Team	Apps	(Gls)
1961–1967	Paraguay	6	(2)

Antonio González (born 3 May 1936) is a Paraguayan footballer. He played in six matches for the Paraguay national football team in 1967. He was also part of Paraguay's squad for the 1967 South American Championship.
