= Celino Mora =

Paraguayan footballer (born 1945)

Personal information
- Date of birth: 21 October 1945 (age 81)
- Place of birth: Asunción, Paraguay
- Position: Forward

International career
Years	Team	Apps	(Gls)
1965–1971	Paraguay	23	(7)

Celino Mora (born 21 October 1945) is a Paraguayan footballer. He played in 23 matches for the Paraguay national football team from 1967 to 1970. He was also part of Paraguay's squad for the 1967 South American Championship.
