= Venezuela national football team =

Men's association football team

Venezuela
- Nickname: La Vinotinto (lit. 'The Red-Wine')
- Association: Federación Venezolana de Fútbol (FVF)
- Confederation: CONMEBOL (South America)
- Head coach: Oswaldo Vizcarrondo
- Captain: Cristian Cásseres Jr.
- Most caps: Tomás Rincón (143)
- Top scorer: Salomón Rondón (50)
- Home stadium: Estadio Monumental; Estadio Olímpico de la UCV; Estadio Metropolitano de Mérida
- FIFA code: VEN
| First colours | Second colours |

FIFA ranking
- Current: 50 ▼1 (18 November 2026)
- Highest: 25 (November 2019)
- Lowest: 129 (November 1998)

First international
- Panama 2–1 Venezuela (Panama City, Panama; 12 February 1938)

Biggest win
- Venezuela 7–0 Puerto Rico (Caracas, Venezuela; 16 January 1959)

Biggest defeat
- Argentina 11–0 Venezuela (Rosario, Argentina; 10 August 1975)

Copa América
- Appearances: 20 (first in 1967)
- Best result: Fourth place (2011)

The Venezuela national football team (Spanish: Selección de fútbol de Venezuela), nicknamed La Vinotinto (lit. 'The Red Wine'), represents Venezuela in men's international football and is controlled by the Federación Venezolana de Fútbol (lit. 'Venezuelan Football Federation'), the governing body for football in Venezuela. Their nickname is a reference to the unique red wine team color that is used on their home jerseys. When playing at home in official games, they usually rotate between three stadiums: The Polideportivo Cachamay in Puerto Ordaz, the Estadio José Antonio Anzoátegui in Puerto La Cruz and the Estadio Pueblo Nuevo in San Cristóbal, though recent FIFA World Cup qualifying campaigns saw home games in other stadiums around the country, including the Estadio Monumental in Maturín. Likewise, in friendly matches, they tend to rotate between the rest of the stadiums in the country.

Unlike other South American nations, and akin to some Caribbean nations, baseball is extremely popular in Venezuela, which diverts athletic talent away from football, contributing to its historic lack of success in CONMEBOL competitions. They are the only CONMEBOL team to have never qualified for the World Cup. Often Venezuela would go through entire qualification tournaments without recording a single win, but this has not happened since 1998. Until Copa América 2011, their best finish at the tournament was fifth in their first entry, in 1967. It is only recently with the spread of the World Cup's popularity in nations where football was not the primary sport (such as Canada, Japan, the United States, and Australia) that the national team found incentives to increase player development and fan support. As of December 2019, Venezuela has the highest position on the FIFA World Ranking of any team that has not yet qualified for the World Cup, being ranked 25th.

== History ==
=== 20th century ===
Venezuela did not participate in FIFA World Cup qualification until the 1966, in which they were drawn with Uruguay and Peru, but did not register a point in four games. In the 1970 qualifiers they managed to register a point, and after withdrawing from the 1974 series, repeated that in the 1978 qualifiers. The 1982 qualifiers saw them register their first win, over Bolivia. They wouldn't register another World Cup qualifying win until the 1994 series when they defeated Ecuador. A highlight of the 1998 qualifiers was goalkeeper Rafael Dudamel scoring against Argentina in a 5–2 defeat.

Despite poor results during the 1960s and 1970s, outstanding players like Luis Mendoza and Rafael Santana achieved recognition. Venezuela also managed to qualify for the 1980 Summer Olympics around this time, the first-ever major international football competition they participated in.

=== Richard Páez era ===
After José Omar Pastoriza's resignation during the 2002 World Cup qualifying campaign, Richard Páez took over as head coach of the national team. In their remaining qualifiers, Venezuela achieved 4 victories in a row against Uruguay, Chile, Peru, and Paraguay. In terms of World Cup qualifying matches, this was the first time the team won more than one game in row and away from home as well as avoided finishing in last place in their entire history.

However, the team failed to qualify for the 2002 World Cup, or the 2006 World Cup, gaining 16 and 18 points respectively. However, the team did achieve progression to the second round of the 2007 Copa America on home soil.

In November 2007, Páez resigned after disagreements with the media and supporters.

=== César Farías era ===
With a new coach César Farías, Venezuela national team improved their performances. At the beginning of 2010 FIFA World Cup qualification, Venezuela won its first game in the World Cup qualification against long-unbeaten Ecuador in Quito and received its first point against Brazil. Despite not reaching the final tournament, Venezuela achieved its best result in qualification. It finished this round with 22 points in 18 matches, surpassing Peru and Bolivia for eighth place in the region.

On 6 June 2008, Venezuela achieved its first-ever triumph over Brazil, defeating the Seleção 2–0 in a friendly match in Boston, United States. Venezuela obtained excellent results in the 2011 Copa América when they finished fourth, their highest finish in the tournament to date. With a squad composed mostly of footballers playing in Europe, they began 2014 World Cup qualification with a historic 1–0 victory against Argentina in Puerto La Cruz, beating it for the first time.

=== Noel Sanvicente era ===
On 4 September 2014, Noel Sanvicente was made coach of the Venezuela national team. The team's first match under Sanvicente was against South Korea in Bucheon on 5 September 2014, ending in a 3–1 defeat.

Venezuela began the World Cup qualification campaign with a 1–0 defeat against Paraguay at home, and did not earn their first point until their match against Peru, a 2–2 draw in Lima where Venezuela led until the last minute of stoppage time. Their match with Chile ended in a disappointing 4–1 defeat. Sanvicente announced his resignation a week later after mutual consent with the FVF. At the time of Sanvicente's departure, Venezuela was last in the qualification standings with a sole point.

=== Rafael Dudamel era ===
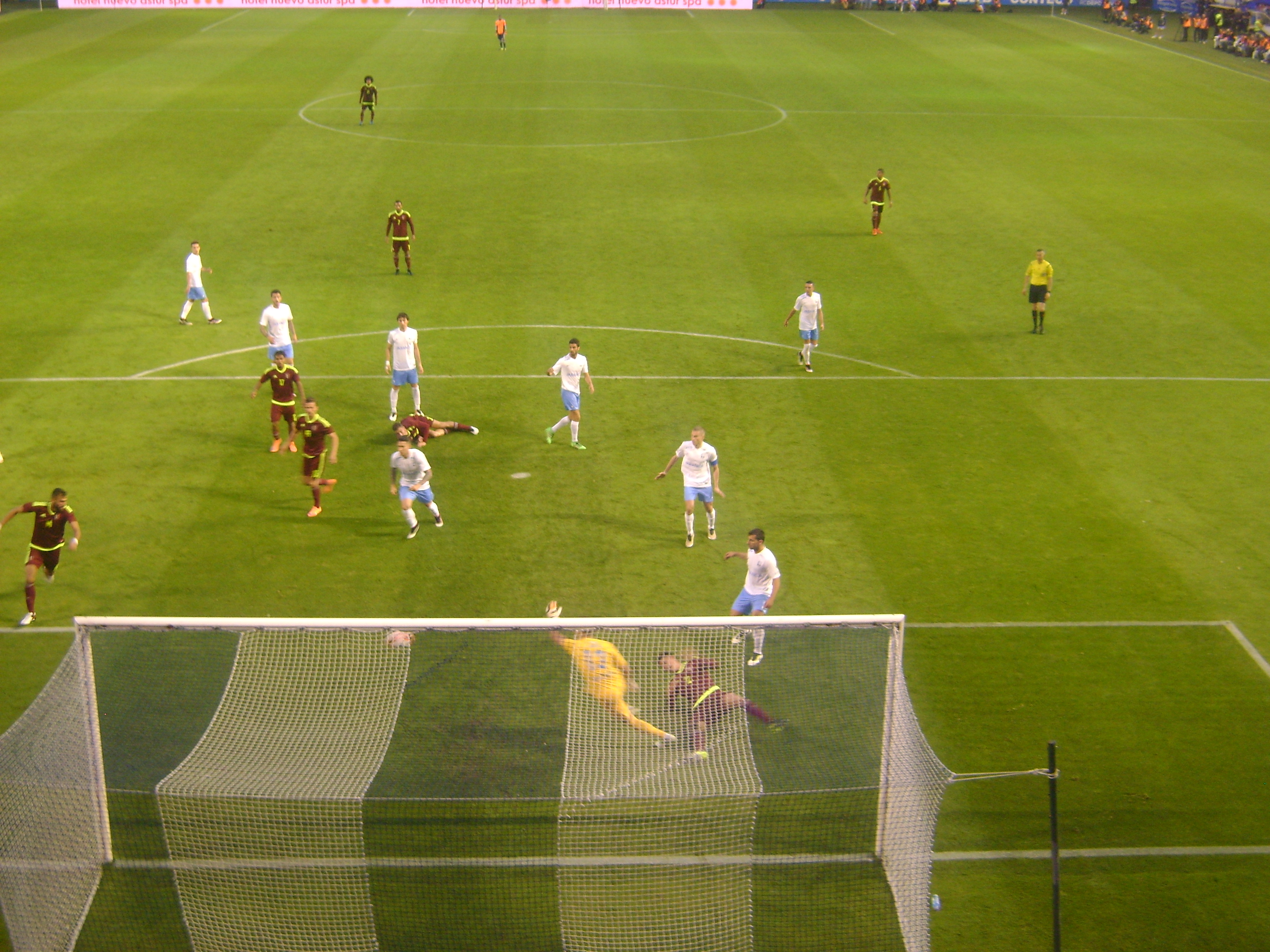
Match between Galicia (in white) and Venezuela (in burgundy).

Sanvicente was replaced by former Vinotinto goalkeeper Rafael Dudamel, who decided to revamp the entire national team, by injecting the team with the promising young generation of Venezuelan players that finished second at the 2017 FIFA U-20 World Cup that was dubbed as the country's first-ever football Golden Generation. Under his management, La Vinotinto quickly improved and reached the quarterfinals in the Copa América Centenario, with two 1–0 victories against Jamaica and Uruguay and a 1–1 draw against Mexico in the group stage and then a 4–1 defeat against Argentina in the quarter-finals. In the seventh matchday of the 2018 World Cup qualifier, Venezuela lost against Colombia 2–0 in Barranquilla, the first loss against Los Cafeteros since 2009. Later, on matchday 11, Venezuela won for the first time in the qualification, 5–0 against Bolivia in Maturín with a hat-trick from Josef Martínez and goals from Jacobo Kouffati and Rómulo Otero.

On 2 January 2020, Dudamel resigned from the national team.

=== José Peseiro era ===
Following Rafael Dudamel's resignation in January 2020, the Venezuelan Football Federation appointed Portuguese coach José Peseiro as the new head coach in February 2020. The COVID-19 pandemic subsequently disrupted the international football calendar, and Venezuela's 2022 FIFA World Cup qualifying campaign did not begin until October 2020.

Venezuela opened the qualifying campaign with defeats against Colombia, Paraguay and Brazil before defeating Chile 2–1 in Caracas for their first points of the campaign. The team subsequently participated in the 2021 Copa América in Brazil. Venezuela drew against Colombia and Ecuador but lost to Brazil and Peru, finishing last in their group and failing to reach the knockout stage.

Peseiro resigned as head coach in August 2021, citing outstanding salary payments and financial difficulties affecting his coaching staff.

=== Leonardo González and José Pékerman eras ===
Former Venezuelan international Leonardo González took over as caretaker manager in September 2021. Under González, Venezuela continued its difficult World Cup qualifying campaign.

In November 2021, the Venezuelan Football Federation appointed Argentine coach José Pékerman as head coach. Pékerman oversaw the final four matches of the 2022 World Cup qualifying campaign, but Venezuela finished tenth and failed to qualify for the 2022 FIFA World Cup, recording 10 points from 18 matches.

Pékerman remained in charge during the beginning of the next World Cup qualifying cycle, but left his position in March 2023. He was replaced by his former assistant Fernando Batista.

=== Fernando Batista era ===
Fernando Batista was appointed head coach of Venezuela in March 2023 after previously serving as an assistant to José Pékerman.

Under Batista, Venezuela made an encouraging start to the 2026 FIFA World Cup qualifying campaign. In 2023, the team defeated Paraguay and Chile at home, drew with Brazil and Ecuador, and also drew away to Peru, while losing its opening match against Colombia.

At the 2024 Copa América in the United States, Venezuela won all three of its group-stage matches against Ecuador, Mexico and Jamaica, finishing first in Group B. It was the first time Venezuela had won all three of its group matches in a single Copa América.

Venezuela was eliminated in the quarter-finals by Canada after a 1–1 draw, losing 4–3 in the penalty shoot-out.

Venezuela's World Cup qualifying campaign subsequently declined. After a strong start in 2023, the team went through a difficult period in 2024, collecting three draws and three defeats in the second half of the year.

In 2025, Venezuela remained in contention for a place in the 2026 World Cup intercontinental play-off. However, the team lost its final two qualifying matches and ultimately failed to qualify for the tournament.

Following the end of the qualifying campaign, the Venezuelan Football Federation ended Batista's tenure along with his coaching staff.

=== Oswaldo Vizcarrondo era ===
Following Batista's departure, former Venezuela international Oswaldo Vizcarrondo was appointed interim head coach in September 2025. He subsequently became the permanent head coach in January 2026 as part of a long-term project covering the 2026–2034 cycle.

The Venezuelan Football Federation presented Vizcarrondo's appointment as part of an eight-year sporting project covering the men's national teams from 2026 to 2034, with an emphasis on continuity, development and coordination between the senior and youth national teams.

== Copa América history ==
Venezuela first participated at the Copa América in 1967, and finished fifth after defeating Bolivia 3–0 with a team containing Mendoza and Santana. The 1975 tournament led Venezuela to be drawn in a group with Brazil and Argentina, and finished bottom with an 11–0 defeat against Argentina. In the 1979 edition, which would be the international swansong for Mendoza and Santana, they held a goalless draw against Colombia and 1–1 against Chile. A highlight of the 1989 tournament was midfielder Carlos Maldonado's four goals. In the 1993 series, Venezuela drew with Uruguay and the United States.

The team's overall Copa América record has been relatively poor (goal difference 33–145 before the 2011 Copa América), but the "Auge Vinotinto" (lit. 'Vinotinto Rise') period in the early 2000s (decade) brought increased attention to the sport in the country, which also brought increased support from both government and private institutions. Said support contributed perfectly to the "Vinotinto" rise in quality. In 2007, during the Copa América held in Venezuela, the team progressed to the quarterfinals for the first time in its history after finishing first in a group containing Peru, Bolivia, and Uruguay. Venezuela's 2–0 victory against Peru during the competition was its first Copa América victory since 1967.

=== 2011 Copa América ===
At the 2011 Copa América championship, Venezuela reached the semi-finals round for the first time by defeating Chile in the quarter-final, 2–1. Despite their commanding presence against Paraguay in their semifinal, Venezuela was unable to convert their chances into goals. They eventually lost 5–3 against Paraguay in a penalty shootout after remaining scoreless in normal and extra time. Venezuela and Peru played for third place at the Estadio Ciudad de La Plata, where Venezuela would suffer their biggest loss of the tournament, losing 4–1 against Peru and falling into fourth place overall. Nonetheless, it was their best-ever finish at the competition.

Group B:

| Team | Pld | W | D | L | GF | GA | GD | Pts |
|---|---|---|---|---|---|---|---|---|
| Brazil | 3 | 1 | 2 | 0 | 6 | 4 | +2 | 5 |
| Venezuela | 3 | 1 | 2 | 0 | 4 | 3 | +1 | 5 |
| Paraguay | 3 | 0 | 3 | 0 | 5 | 5 | 0 | 3 |
| Ecuador | 3 | 0 | 1 | 2 | 2 | 5 | −3 | 1 |

Results:

| 3 July 2011 Group stages | Brazil | 0–0 | Venezuela | La Plata, Argentina |
| 16:00 UTC-3 | | Report | | Stadium: Estadio Ciudad de La Plata; Referee: Raúl Orosco (Bolivia) |

| 9 July 2011 Group stages | Venezuela | 1–0 | Ecuador | Salta, Argentina |
| 18:30 UTC-3 | C. González 61' | Report | | Stadium: Estadio Padre Ernesto Martearena; Referee: Wálter Quesada (Costa Rica) |

| 13 July 2011 Group stages | Paraguay | 3–3 | Venezuela | Salta, Argentina |
| 19:15 UTC-3 | Alcaraz 32'; Barrios 62'; Riveros 85' | Report | Rondón 5'; Miku 89'; Perozo 90+2' | Stadium: Estadio Padre Ernesto Martearena; Referee: Enrique Osses (Chile) |

| 17 July 2011 Quarterfinals | Chile | 1–2 | Venezuela | San Juan, Argentina |
| 19:15 UTC-3 | Suazo 69' | Report | Vizcarrondo 34'; Cichero 80' | Stadium: Estadio del Bicentenario; Referee: Carlos Vera (Ecuador) |

| 20 July 2011 Semifinals | Venezuela | 0–0 (3–5 p) | Paraguay | Mendoza, Argentina |
| 21:45 UTC-3 | | Report | | Stadium: Estadio Malvinas Argentinas; Referee: Francisco Chacón (Mexico) |
| | Penalties |
| | Maldonado (penalty scored); Rey (penalty scored); Lucena (penalty missed); Miku (penalty scored) | | (penalty scored) Ortigoza; (penalty scored) Barrios; (penalty scored) Riveros; (penalty scored) Martínez; (penalty scored) Verón |

| 23 July 2011 Third-place match | Peru | 4–1 | Venezuela | La Plata, Argentina |
| 16:00 UTC-3 | Chiroque 41'; Guerrero 63', 89', 90+2' | Report | Arango 77' | Stadium: Estadio Ciudad de La Plata; Referee: Wilmar Roldán (Colombia) |

== Team image ==
Venezuela made its international debut in the Central American and Caribbean Games held in Panama in 1938, wearing the vinotinto (burgundy) color. The burgundy color originated from the uniform of the Venezuelan National Guard. In the 1967 Copa América Venezuela also wore the Peñarol shirt v Chile to avoid colors clash, as Venezuela had arrived in the Estadio Centenario (Peñarol's frequent venue) with no alternate shirts.

In 1993, a vertical band with the colors of the National flag was added to the left side of the jersey, which changed its colors to a more traditional red tone. This lasted until 1996 when Venezuela returned to the vinotinto tone.

In 1998, Venezuela adopted a yellow/blue/red scheme, similar to their flag colors, by Mexican manufacturer "ABA Sports". The national team returned to the traditional color in 2000. It has been remaining (with few changes) as the main uniform up to present days.

== Uniform and coat of arms ==
=== Uniform ===
In October 2018, the Venezuelan Football Federation announced that the national team would end its thirteen-year relationship with Adidas and switch to uniforms made by the Italian company Givova starting in 2019. Givova supplied the Venezuelan national teams from 2019 through 2023.

In June 2023, the Venezuelan Football Federation announced that Adidas would return as the official kit supplier of all Venezuelan national football teams beginning in 2024. The agreement covers the men's and women's field football teams, as well as futsal and beach soccer teams, at all age levels.

Adidas unveiled the new Venezuelan national team kits in February 2024. The home kit returned to the traditional Vinotinto colour, while the away kit incorporated the yellow, blue and red colours of the Venezuelan flag.

In November 2025, Adidas and the Venezuelan Football Federation presented a new home shirt inspired by the tepuis of Venezuela. The design retained Vinotinto as its predominant colour and incorporated the colours of the Venezuelan flag in the Adidas shoulder stripes.

In March 2026, Adidas and the Venezuelan Football Federation presented the new away shirt for 2026. The shirt features a historical version of the federation's emblem, based on the emblem used between 1961 and 1967.

=== Kit providers ===
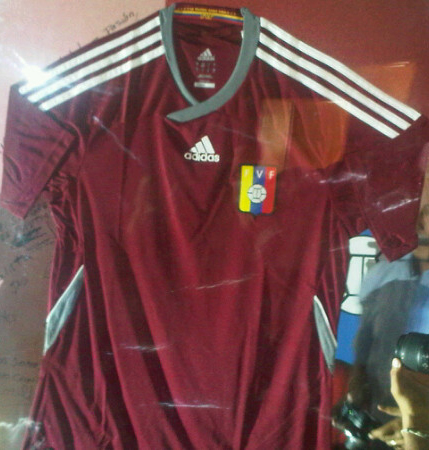
Adidas jersey worn during the 2014 World Cup qualifying

| Manufacturer | Period |
|---|---|
| (Germany) Adidas | 1981–1991 |
| (Venezuela) Forte | 1992–1995 |
| (United States) Score | 1995–1996 |
| (Peru) Polmer | 1996–1997 |
| (Mexico) Aba Sport | 1998–1999 |
| (Mexico) Atlética | 2000–2004 |
| (Germany) Adidas | 2005–2018 |
| (Italy) Givova | 2019–2023 |
| (Germany) Adidas | 2024– |

=== Coat of arms ===
The emblem of the Venezuelan national football team is derived from the insignia of the Federación Venezolana de Fútbol (FVF). The current emblem incorporates the national identity of Venezuela and is used by the country's national football teams.

The federation has used different emblems throughout its history. The 2026 Adidas away kit features a historical emblem based on the insignia used by the federation between 1961 and 1967, with the word "VENEZUELA" prominently displayed. The design was introduced as a historical reference connecting the current national teams with the origins of Venezuelan football.

== Results and fixtures ==
The following is a list of match results in the last 12 months, as well as any future matches that have been scheduled.

Win Draw Loss Fixture

=== 2026 ===
| 27 March 2026 2026 FIFA Series | Venezuela | 4–1 | Trinidad and Tobago | Tashkent, Uzbekistan |
| 15:00 UTC+5 | Alfonzo 60', 67'; Rondón 81', 85' | Report | Moore 52' | Stadium: Pakhtakor Stadium; Attendance: 1,000; Referee: Rustam Lutfullin (Uzbekistan) |

| 30 March 2026 2026 FIFA Series | Uzbekistan | 0–0 (5–4 p) | Venezuela | Tashkent, Uzbekistan |
| 19:00 UTC+5 | | Report | | Stadium: Milliy Stadium; Attendance: 29,225; Referee: Mederbek Taichiev (Kyrgyzstan) |
| | Penalties |
| | Iskanderov (penalty scored); Temirov (penalty scored); Ashurmatov (penalty scored); Shukurov (penalty scored); Mozgovoy (penalty scored) | | (penalty scored) Rondón; (penalty scored) L. González; (penalty missed) Sosa; (penalty scored) Quintero; (penalty scored) Segovia |

| 6 June 2026 Friendly | Venezuela | 1–2 | Turkey | Fort Lauderdale, United States |
| 19:00 UTC−4 | Mendoza 13' | Report | Yılmaz 44'; Akgün 54' | Stadium: Inter Miami CF Stadium; Attendance: 14,000; Referee: Daniel Quintero (Mexico) |

| 9 June 2026 Friendly | Venezuela | 2–0 | Iraq | Bridgeview, United States |
| 20:00 UTC−5 | Cásseres Jr. 17'; Ramírez 46' | Report | | Stadium: SeatGeek Stadium; Referee: Filip Dujic (Canada) |

| 28 September 2026 Kirin Challenge Cup 2026 | Japan | 2–1 | Venezuela | Hiroshima, Japan |
| 19:25 UTC+9 | Ueda 49' (pen.), 90+6' | Report | Kelsy 46' | Stadium: Edion Peace Wing Hiroshima; Attendance: 27,882; Referee: Tim Danaskos (Australia) |

| 2 October 2026 Friendly | South Korea | 0–0 | Venezuela | Ulsan, South Korea |
| 20:00 UTC+9 | | Report | | Stadium: Ulsan Munsu Football Stadium; Attendance: 35,911; Referee: Alireza Faghani (Australia) |

| 6 October 2026 Friendly | Jordan | 0–0 | Venezuela | Amman, Jordan |
| 20:00 UTC+3 | | Report | | Stadium: King Abdullah II Stadium; Referee: Mohanad Qasim Sarray (Iraq) |

| 14 November 2026 Friendly | Basque Country | 1–0 | Venezuela | Bilbao, Spain |
| 20:00 UTC+1 | Jauregizar 27' | Report | | Stadium: San Mamés Stadium; Attendance: 40,041; Referee: Ricardo de Burgos Bengoetxea (Basque Country) |

| 17 November 2026 Friendly | Russia | 2–0 | Venezuela | Krasnodar, Russia |
| 19:00 UTC+3 | Al. Miranchuk 59', 75' | Report | | Stadium: Krasnodar Stadium; Attendance: 31,701; Referee: Firdavs Norsafarov (Uzbekistan) |

== Coaching staff ==
| Position | Name |
|---|---|
| Head coach | (Venezuela) Oswaldo Vizcarrondo |
| Assistant coach | (Brazil) Cleber Xavier |
| Assistant coach | (Venezuela) Fernando Aristeguieta |
| Physical trainer | (Uruguay) Óscar Ortega |
| Goalkeeper coach | (Colombia) Mario Marín |

=== Coaching history ===
Caretaker managers are listed in italics.

- (Italy) Vittorio Godigna (1938)
- (Peru) Sixto Soler (1944–1946)
- (Venezuela) Álvaro Cartea (1947–1948)
- (Brazil) Orlando Fantoni (1951, 1955–1959)
- (Argentina) Miguel Ángel Gleria (1951)
- (Argentina) Rafael Franco (1961–1967)
- (Argentina) Gregorio Gómez (1967–1969)
- (Venezuela) Rafael Gonzalez (1970-1972)
- (Venezuela) José Julián Hernández (1972)
- (Greece) Dan Georgiadis (1972–1977)
- (Venezuela) Luis Mendoza (1981, 1989)
- (Uruguay) Walter Roque (1981–1985)
- (Venezuela) Rafael Santana (1985–1986, 1996)
- (Argentina) Carlos Horacio Moreno (1989)
- (Uruguay) Víctor Pignanelli (1990–1992)
- (Federal Republic of Yugoslavia) Ratomir Dujković (1992–1995)
- (Colombia) Eduardo Borrero (1997–1998)
- (Argentina) José Omar Pastoriza (1998–2000)
- (Venezuela) Richard Páez (2001–2007)
- (Venezuela) César Farías (2007–2013)
- (Spain) Manuel Plasencia (2014)
- (Venezuela) Noel Sanvicente (2014–2016)
- (Venezuela) Rafael Dudamel (2016–2020)
- (Portugal) José Peseiro (2020–2021)
- (Venezuela) Leonardo González (2021)
- (Argentina) José Pékerman (2021–2023)
- (Argentina) Fernando Batista (2023–2025)
- (Venezuela) Fernando Aristeguieta (2025)
- (Venezuela) Oswaldo Vizcarrondo (2025, 2026–)

== Players ==
=== Current squad ===
The following players were called up to the friendly matches against Basque Country and Russia on 14 and 17 November 2026, respectively.

- Caps and goals are correct as of 17 November 2026, after the match against Russia.
- Friendlies not recognized by FIFA are not counted.

| No. | Pos. | Player | Date of birth (age) | Caps | Goals | Club |
|---|---|---|---|---|---|---|
| 1 | GK | José Contreras | 20 October 1994 (age 32) | 15 | 0 | (Ecuadorian Football Federation) Barcelona |
| 12 | GK | Cristopher Varela | 27 November 1999 (age 26) | 2 | 0 | (Venezuelan Football Federation) Deportivo La Guaira |
| 22 | GK | Miguel Silva | 28 July 2000 (age 26) | 0 | 0 | (Venezuelan Football Federation) Carabobo |
| 32 | GK | Frankarlos Benítez | 3 May 2004 (age 22) | 0 | 0 | (Venezuelan Football Federation) Caracas |
| 2 | DF | Nahuel Ferraresi | 19 November 1998 (age 28) | 48 | 1 | (Brazilian Football Confederation) Botafogo |
| 3 | DF | Yordan Osorio | 10 May 1994 (age 32) | 38 | 0 | (Colombian Football Federation) Tolima |
| 4 | DF | Jon Aramburu | 23 July 2002 (age 24) | 25 | 1 | (Royal Spanish Football Federation) Real Sociedad |
| 13 | DF | Luis Balbo | 28 March 2006 (age 20) | 7 | 0 | (Austrian Football Association) Sturm Graz |
| 14 | DF | Christian Makoun | 5 March 2000 (age 26) | 17 | 0 | (Bulgarian Football Union) Levski Sofia |
| 23 | DF | Adrián Cova | 13 February 2001 (age 25) | 2 | 0 | (Bulgarian Football Union) Lokomotiv Plovdiv |
| 24 | DF | Adrián Palacios | 7 June 2004 (age 22) | 0 | 0 | (Royal Belgian Football Association) Genk |
| 6 | MF | Yangel Herrera | 7 January 1998 (age 28) | 48 | 3 | (Royal Spanish Football Federation) Real Sociedad |
| 8 | MF | Cristian Cásseres (captain) | 20 January 2000 (age 26) | 51 | 1 | (French Football Federation) Toulouse |
| 10 | MF | Telasco Segovia | 2 April 2003 (age 23) | 21 | 2 | (United States Soccer Federation) Inter Miami |
| 17 | MF | Daniel Pereira | 14 July 2000 (age 26) | 14 | 0 | (Canadian Soccer Association) Montréal |
| 18 | MF | Marco Libra | 21 March 2008 (age 18) | 4 | 0 | (Italian Football Federation) Bologna Primavera |
| 21 | MF | Sebastián Mendoza | 29 October 2005 (age 21) | 1 | 0 | (Venezuelan Football Federation) Carabobo |
| 25 | MF | Jeferson Caraballo | 8 May 2002 (age 24) | 1 | 0 | (Venezuelan Football Federation) Deportivo Táchira |
| 9 | FW | Jesús Ramírez | 4 May 1998 (age 28) | 9 | 2 | (Turkish Football Federation) Çorum |
| 11 | FW | Jefferson Savarino | 11 November 1996 (age 30) | 52 | 4 | (Brazilian Football Confederation) Fluminense |
| 15 | FW | Eduard Bello | 20 August 1995 (age 31) | 27 | 4 | (Colombian Football Federation) Deportivo Cali |
| 16 | FW | Matías Lacava | 24 October 2002 (age 24) | 3 | 0 | (Portuguese Football Federation) Vizela |
| 19 | FW | Kevin Kelsy | 27 July 2004 (age 22) | 9 | 1 | (Scottish Football Association) Rangers |
| 20 | FW | Luifer Hernández | 28 April 2001 (age 25) | 0 | 0 | (Mexican Football Federation) Puebla |
| 27 | FW | Robinson Flores | 14 April 1998 (age 28) | 1 | 0 | (Venezuelan Football Federation) Puerto Cabello |

=== Recent call-ups ===
The following players have been called up for the team in the last 12 months.

| Pos. | Player | Date of birth (age) | Caps | Goals | Club | Latest call-up |
|---|---|---|---|---|---|---|
| GK | Wuilker Faríñez | 15 February 1998 (age 28) | 42 | 0 | (Colombia) Inter Bogotá | v. Basque Country, 14 November 2026 ^{PRE} |
| GK | Joel Graterol | 13 February 1997 (age 29) | 14 | 0 | (Venezuela) Puerto Cabello | v. Basque Country, 14 November 2026 ^{PRE} |
| GK | Javier Otero | 18 November 2002 (age 24) | 1 | 0 | (United States) Orlando City | v. Iraq, 9 June 2026 |
| GK | Eduardo Bores | 28 October 2002 (age 24) | 0 | 0 | (Ecuador) Emelec | v. Turkey, 6 June 2026 ^{PRE} |
| GK | Jesús Camargo | 12 December 1997 (age 28) | 1 | 0 | (Colombia) Once Caldas | v. Uzbekistan, 30 March 2026 |
| GK | Jorge Sánchez | 30 September 2006 (age 20) | 0 | 0 | (Venezuela) Deportivo La Guaira | Training module, 15–19 February 2026 |
| DF | Teo Quintero | 2 March 1999 (age 27) | 8 | 0 | (Netherlands) Sparta Rotterdam | v. Russia, 17 November 2026 ^{INJ} |
| DF | Alessandro Milani | 14 June 2005 (age 21) | 3 | 0 | (Italy) Inter Milan U23 | v. Basque Country, 14 November 2026 ^{INJ} |
| DF | Ronald Hernández | 18 October 1995 (age 31) | 35 | 1 | (United States) Portland Timbers | v. Basque Country, 14 November 2026 ^{PRE} |
| DF | Andrusw Araujo | 5 June 2003 (age 23) | 2 | 0 | (Ukraine) Polissya Zhytomyr | v. Basque Country, 14 November 2026 ^{PRE} |
| DF | Juan Camilo Pérez | 22 December 1998 (age 27) | 0 | 0 | (Venezuela) Carabobo | v. Basque Country, 14 November 2026 ^{PRE} |
| DF | Román Davis | 1 August 2008 (age 18) | 1 | 0 | (Spain) Valencia Mestalla | v. Basque Country, 14 November 2026 ^{WD} |
| DF | Marcos Maitán | 18 April 2008 (age 18) | 0 | 0 | (Venezuela) Monagas | v. Basque Country, 14 November 2026 ^{WD} |
| DF | Carlos Vivas | 4 April 2002 (age 24) | 5 | 0 | (Colombia) Inter Bogotá | v. Jordan, 6 October 2026 |
| DF | Delvin Alfonzo | 9 April 2000 (age 26) | 4 | 2 | (Venezuela) Deportivo Táchira | v. Jordan, 6 October 2026 |
| DF | Juan David Sánchez | 6 October 2005 (age 21) | 1 | 0 | (Venezuela) Deportivo Táchira | v. Jordan, 6 October 2026 |
| DF | Bianneider Tamayo | 13 January 2005 (age 21) | 0 | 0 | Universidad de Chile | v. Jordan, 6 October 2026 |
| DF | Luis Quero | 28 June 2004 (age 22) | 0 | 0 | (Venezuela) Portuguesa | Training module, 23–27 August 2026 |
| DF | Isaac Ramírez | 18 July 2001 (age 25) | 0 | 0 | (Venezuela) Metropolitanos | Training module, 23–27 August 2026 |
| DF | Carlos Rojas | 23 January 2004 (age 22) | 0 | 0 | (Venezuela) Deportivo La Guaira | Training module, 23–27 August 2026 |
| DF | Isaí Valladares | 12 February 2005 (age 21) | 0 | 0 | (Venezuela) Zamora | Training module, 23–27 August 2026 |
| DF | Diego Osío | 3 January 1997 (age 29) | 2 | 0 | (Iraq) Al-Zawraa | v. Iraq, 9 June 2026 |
| DF | Franco Provenzano | 15 February 2005 (age 21) | 0 | 0 | (Venezuela) Deportivo Táchira | v. Turkey, 6 June 2026 ^{PRE} |
| DF | Yiandro Raap | 25 July 2006 (age 20) | 0 | 0 | (Finland) Ilves | v. Turkey, 6 June 2026 ^{PRE} |
| DF | Thomas Gutiérrez | 1 May 2000 (age 26) | 1 | 0 | (Paraguay) Nacional | v. Turkey, 6 June 2026 ^{WD} |
| DF | Ángel Azuaje | 25 September 2004 (age 22) | 0 | 0 | (Mexico) UNAM | v. Turkey, 6 June 2026 ^{WD} |
| DF | Luis Casimiro Peña | 7 March 2002 (age 24) | 0 | 0 | (Venezuela) Deportivo La Guaira | v. Turkey, 6 June 2026 ^{WD} |
| DF | Luis Mago | 15 September 1994 (age 32) | 19 | 2 | (Turkey) Muğlaspor | Training module, 15–19 February 2026 |
| DF | Yohan Cumana | 8 March 1996 (age 30) | 9 | 0 | (Venezuela) UCV | Training module, 15–19 February 2026 |
| DF | Eduardo Fereira | 20 September 2000 (age 26) | 0 | 0 | (Venezuela) Caracas | Training module, 15–19 February 2026 |
| DF | Andrés Kinsler | 25 January 2005 (age 21) | 0 | 0 | (Venezuela) Rayo Zuliano | Training module, 15–19 February 2026 |
| DF | Kendrys Silva | 17 December 1993 (age 32) | 0 | 0 | (Venezuela) UCV | Training module, 15–19 February 2026 |
| DF | Jonathan Bilbao | 29 July 1999 (age 27) | 0 | 0 | (Venezuela) Carabobo | Training module, 15–19 February 2026 ^{WD} |
| DF | Franyer Oliveros | 14 October 2004 (age 22) | 0 | 0 | (Venezuela) Carabobo | Training module, 15–19 February 2026 ^{WD} |
| MF | Yerson Chacón | 4 June 2003 (age 23) | 1 | 0 | (Cyprus) AEK Larnaca | v. Basque Country, 14 November 2026 ^{INJ} |
| MF | Wikelman Carmona | 24 February 2003 (age 23) | 5 | 0 | (Canada) Montréal | v. Basque Country, 14 November 2026 ^{PRE} |
| MF | Jorge Yriarte | 4 March 2000 (age 26) | 4 | 1 | (Poland) Śląsk Wrocław | v. Basque Country, 14 November 2026 ^{PRE} |
| MF | Keiber Lamadrid | 18 November 2003 (age 23) | 2 | 0 | (England) West Ham United | v. Basque Country, 14 November 2026 ^{PRE} |
| MF | Jesús Bueno | 15 April 1999 (age 27) | 1 | 0 | (United States) Philadelphia Union | v. Basque Country, 14 November 2026 ^{PRE} |
| MF | Henrry Díaz | 3 March 2008 (age 18) | 0 | 0 | (Venezuela) Monagas | v. Basque Country, 14 November 2026 ^{WD} |
| MF | Nicola Profeta | 27 February 2006 (age 20) | 0 | 0 | (Brazil) Santos U20 | v. Jordan, 6 October 2026 |
| MF | Gustavo González | 20 February 1996 (age 30) | 1 | 0 | (Venezuela) Puerto Cabello | Training module, 23–27 August 2026 |
| MF | Juan Castellanos | 30 October 1995 (age 31) | 0 | 0 | (Venezuela) Deportivo La Guaira | Training module, 23–27 August 2026 |
| MF | Wilfred Correa | 12 December 2005 (age 20) | 0 | 0 | (Venezuela) Caracas | Training module, 23–27 August 2026 |
| MF | José Correa | 25 March 2006 (age 20) | 0 | 0 | (Venezuela) Deportivo La Guaira | v. Turkey, 6 June 2026 ^{WD} |
| MF | Luis González | 22 December 1990 (age 35) | 11 | 0 | (Venezuela) Monagas | v. Uzbekistan, 30 March 2026 |
| MF | Carlos Faya | 18 January 2002 (age 24) | 2 | 0 | (Venezuela) Deportivo La Guaira | v. Uzbekistan, 30 March 2026 |
| MF | Ángel Figueroa | 29 May 2005 (age 21) | 0 | 0 | (Venezuela) Caracas | Training module, 15–19 February 2026 |
| MF | Jhon Marchán | 2 September 1998 (age 28) | 0 | 0 | (Venezuela) Puerto Cabello | Training module, 15–19 February 2026 |
| MF | Daniel Saggiomo | 2 July 1998 (age 28) | 0 | 0 | (Venezuela) Puerto Cabello | Training module, 15–19 February 2026 ^{INJ} |
| FW | Gleiker Mendoza | 8 December 2001 (age 24) | 11 | 1 | (Ukraine) Shakhtar Donetsk | v. Basque Country, 14 November 2026 ^{INJ} |
| FW | David Martínez | 7 February 2006 (age 20) | 7 | 0 | (Denmark) Midtjylland | v. Basque Country, 14 November 2026 ^{INJ} |
| FW | Alejandro Marqués | 4 August 2000 (age 26) | 5 | 0 | (Spain) Granada | v. Basque Country, 14 November 2026 ^{PRE} |
| FW | Bryan Castillo | 14 May 2001 (age 25) | 2 | 0 | (Venezuela) Carabobo | v. Basque Country, 14 November 2026 ^{PRE} |
| FW | Ender Echenique | 2 April 2004 (age 22) | 3 | 0 | (United States) Cincinnati | v. Basque Country, 14 November 2026 ^{WD} |
| FW | Yerwin Sulbarán | 3 March 2008 (age 18) | 2 | 0 | (Austria) Liefering | v. Basque Country, 14 November 2026 ^{WD} |
| FW | Jesús González | 8 October 2008 (age 18) | 0 | 0 | (Venezuela) Deportivo La Guaira | v. Basque Country, 14 November 2026 ^{WD} |
| FW | Jovanny Bolívar | 16 December 2001 (age 24) | 4 | 0 | (Greece) Kalamata | v. Jordan, 6 October 2026 |
| FW | Edson Tortolero | 5 February 1998 (age 28) | 4 | 0 | (Colombia) América de Cali | v. Jordan, 6 October 2026 |
| FW | Jhonder Cádiz | 29 July 1995 (age 31) | 19 | 2 | (China) Wuhan Three Towns | v. Jordan, 6 October 2026 ^{WD} |
| FW | Jean Franco Castillo | 4 October 2002 (age 24) | 0 | 0 | (Venezuela) Puerto Cabello | v. Japan, 28 September 2026 ^{PRE} |
| FW | Loureins Martínez | 16 April 2005 (age 21) | 0 | 0 | (Venezuela) Carabobo | v. Japan, 28 September 2026 ^{PRE} |
| FW | Carlos Sosa | 2 August 1995 (age 31) | 2 | 0 | (Venezuela) Deportivo Táchira | Training module, 23–27 August 2026 |
| FW | Ronald Rodríguez | 5 April 2005 (age 21) | 0 | 0 | (Venezuela) Monagas | Training module, 23–27 August 2026 |
| FW | Sergio Córdova | 9 August 1997 (age 29) | 19 | 0 | (Turkey) Batman Petrolspor | v. Turkey, 6 June 2026 ^{INJ} |
| FW | Eric Ramírez | 20 November 1998 (age 27) | 12 | 2 | (Venezuela) Carabobo | v. Turkey, 6 June 2026 ^{WD} |
| FW | Salomón Rondón | 16 September 1989 (age 37) | 122 | 50 | (Mexico) Pachuca | v. Uzbekistan, 30 March 2026 |
| FW | Daniel De Sousa | 13 February 2004 (age 22) | 0 | 0 | (Venezuela) UCV | Training module, 15–19 February 2026 |
| FW | Edwuin Pernía | 12 February 1995 (age 31) | 0 | 0 | (Venezuela) Puerto Cabello | Training module, 15–19 February 2026 |
| FW | Cristian Romero | 18 February 2005 (age 21) | 0 | 0 | (Venezuela) Rayo Zuliano | Training module, 15–19 February 2026 |
| FW | José Balza | 15 June 1997 (age 29) | 0 | 0 | (Venezuela) Deportivo Táchira | Training module, 15–19 February 2026 ^{WD} |
^{INJ} Withdrew due to injury; ^{PRE} Preliminary squad; ^{SUS} Suspended; ^{WD} Withdrew from the squad

== Player records ==
As of 17 November 2026
Players in bold are still active with Venezuela.

=== Most appearances ===
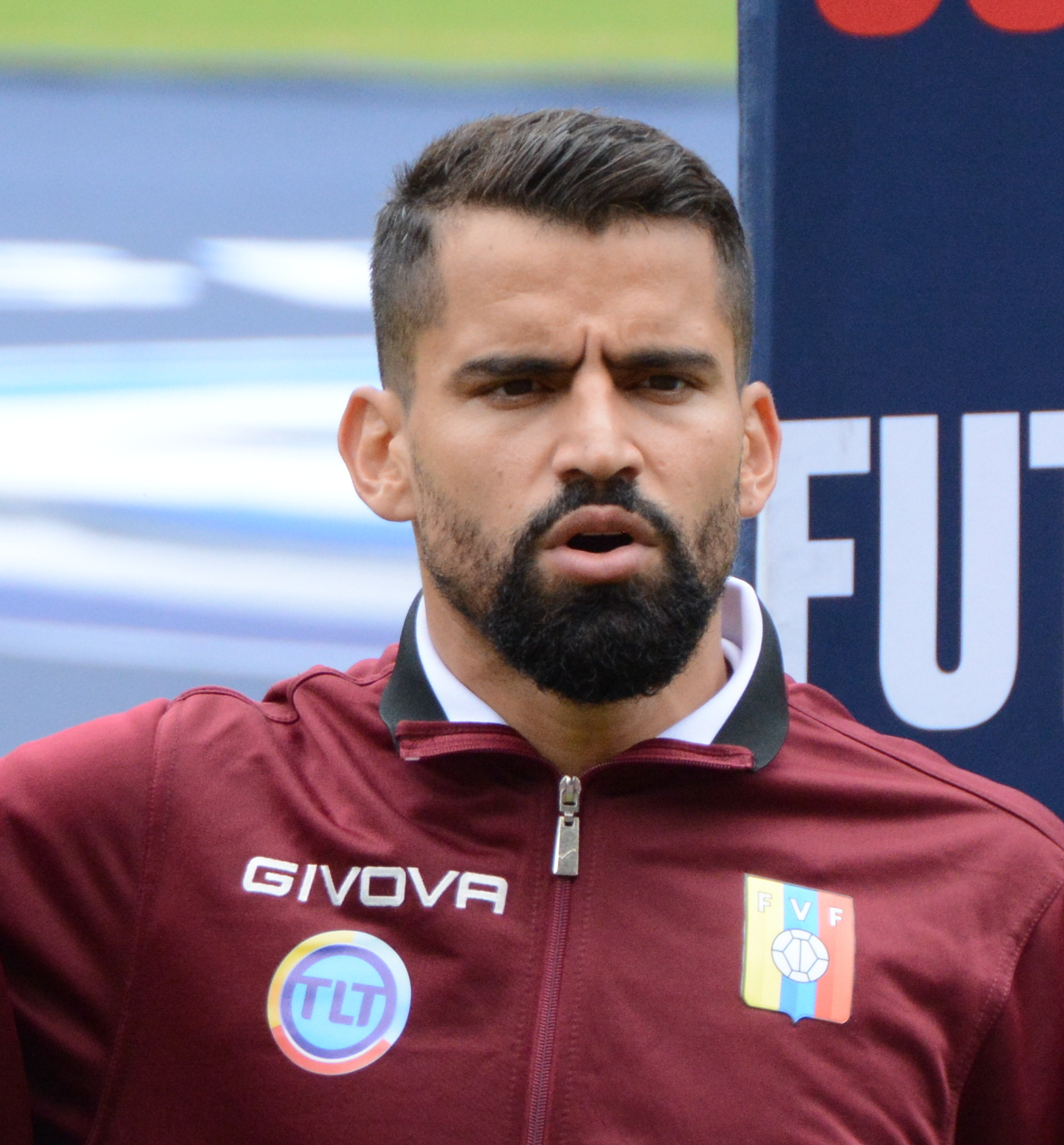
Midfielder Tomás Rincón is the most capped player with 143 appearances.

| Rank | Player | Caps | Goals | Career |
|---|---|---|---|---|
| 1 | Tomás Rincón | 143 | 1 | 2008–2025 |
| 2 | Juan Arango | 129 | 22 | 1999–2015 |
| 3 | **Salomón Rondón** | 122 | 50 | 2008–present |
| 4 | José Manuel Rey | 115 | 10 | 1997–2011 |
| 5 | **Roberto Rosales** | 96 | 1 | 2007–present |
| 6 | Jorge Rojas | 87 | 3 | 1999–2009 |
| 7 | Miguel Mea Vitali | 84 | 1 | 1999–2012 |
| 8 | Oswaldo Vizcarrondo | 80 | 7 | 2004–2016 |
| 9 | Gabriel Urdaneta | 77 | 9 | 1996–2005 |
| 10 | Luis Vallenilla | 76 | 0 | 1996–2007 |

=== Top goalscorers ===
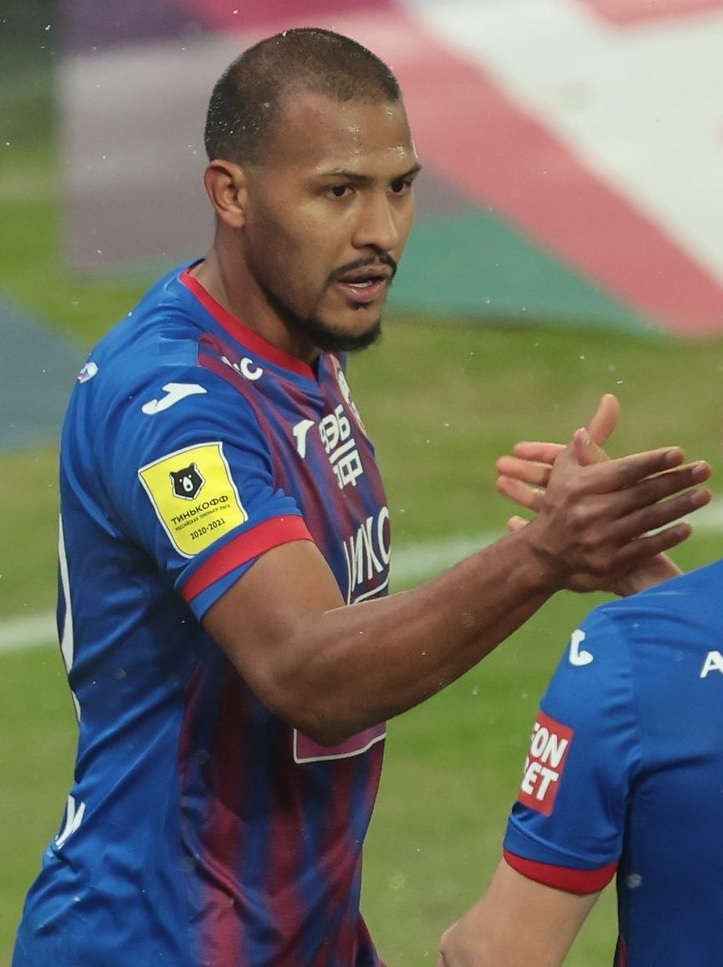
Salomón Rondón is the nation's all-time top goalscorer.

| Rank | Player | Goals | Caps | Ratio | Career |
|---|---|---|---|---|---|
| 1 | **Salomón Rondón** | 50 | 122 | 0.41 | 2008–present |
| 2 | Giancarlo Maldonado | 22 | 65 | 0.34 | 2003–2011 |
| 2 | Juan Arango | 22 | 129 | 0.17 | 1999–2015 |
| 4 | **Josef Martínez** | 15 | 70 | 0.21 | 2011–present |
| 5 | Ruberth Morán | 14 | 63 | 0.22 | 1996–2007 |
| 6 | Miku | 11 | 50 | 0.22 | 2006–2015 |
| 6 | **Darwin Machís** | 11 | 52 | 0.21 | 2011–present |
| 8 | Daniel Arismendi | 10 | 30 | 0.33 | 2006–2011 |
| 8 | José Manuel Rey | 10 | 115 | 0.09 | 1997–2011 |
| 10 | Gabriel Urdaneta | 9 | 77 | 0.12 | 1996–2005 |

== Competitive record ==
=== FIFA World Cup ===
| FIFA World Cup record | | | | | | | | | Qualification record | | | | | |
| Year | Round | Position | Pld | W | D | L | GF | GA | Pld | W | D | L | GF | GA |
|---|---|---|---|---|---|---|---|---|---|---|---|---|---|---|
| (Uruguay) 1930 | Not a FIFA member | | | | | | | | Not a FIFA member | | | | | |
| (Italy) 1934 | Not a FIFA member | | | | | | | | Not a FIFA member | | | | | |
| (France) 1938 | Not a FIFA member | | | | | | | | Not a FIFA member | | | | | |
| (Brazil) 1950 | Not a FIFA member | | | | | | | | Not a FIFA member | | | | | |
| (Switzerland) 1954 | Did not enter | | | | | | | | Declined participation | | | | | |
| (Sweden) 1958 | Withdrew | | | | | | | | Withdrew | | | | | |
| (Chile) 1962 | Did not enter | | | | | | | | Declined participation | | | | | |
| (England) 1966 | Did not qualify | | | | | | | | 4 | 0 | 0 | 4 | 4 | 15 |
| (Mexico) 1970 | Did not qualify | | | | | | | | 6 | 0 | 1 | 5 | 1 | 18 |
| (West Germany) 1974 | Withdrew | | | | | | | | Withdrew | | | | | |
| (Argentina) 1978 | Did not qualify | | | | | | | | 4 | 0 | 1 | 3 | 2 | 8 |
| (Spain) 1982 | Did not qualify | | | | | | | | 4 | 1 | 0 | 3 | 1 | 9 |
| (Mexico) 1986 | Did not qualify | | | | | | | | 6 | 0 | 1 | 5 | 5 | 15 |
| (Italy) 1990 | Did not qualify | | | | | | | | 4 | 0 | 0 | 4 | 1 | 18 |
| (United States) 1994 | Did not qualify | | | | | | | | 8 | 1 | 0 | 7 | 4 | 34 |
| (France) 1998 | Did not qualify | | | | | | | | 16 | 0 | 3 | 13 | 8 | 41 |
| (South Korea) (Japan) 2002 | Did not qualify | | | | | | | | 18 | 5 | 1 | 12 | 18 | 44 |
| (Germany) 2006 | Did not qualify | | | | | | | | 18 | 5 | 3 | 10 | 20 | 28 |
| (South Africa) 2010 | Did not qualify | | | | | | | | 18 | 6 | 4 | 8 | 23 | 29 |
| (Brazil) 2014 | Did not qualify | | | | | | | | 16 | 5 | 5 | 6 | 14 | 20 |
| (Russia) 2018 | Did not qualify | | | | | | | | 18 | 2 | 6 | 10 | 19 | 35 |
| (Qatar) 2022 | Did not qualify | | | | | | | | 18 | 3 | 1 | 14 | 14 | 34 |
| (Canada) (Mexico) (United States) 2026 | Did not qualify | | | | | | | | 18 | 4 | 6 | 8 | 18 | 28 |
| (Morocco) (Portugal) (Spain) 2030 | To be determined | | | | | | | | To be determined | | | | | |
| (Saudi Arabia) 2034 | To be determined | | | | | | | | To be determined | | | | | |
| Total | | 0/19 | | | | | | | 176 | 32 | 32 | 112 | 152 | 376 |

=== Copa América ===
Champions Runners-up Third place Fourth place

South American Championship / Copa América record
| Year | Round | Position | Pld | W | D | L | GF | GA | Squad |
|---|---|---|---|---|---|---|---|---|---|
| (Argentina) 1916 | No national representative | | | | | | | | |
| (Uruguay) 1917 | No national representative | | | | | | | | |
| (Brazil) 1919 | No national representative | | | | | | | | |
| (Chile) 1920 | No national representative | | | | | | | | |
| (Argentina) 1921 | No national representative | | | | | | | | |
| (Brazil) 1922 | No national representative | | | | | | | | |
| (Uruguay) 1923 | No national representative | | | | | | | | |
| (Uruguay) 1924 | No national representative | | | | | | | | |
| (Argentina) 1925 | Not a CONMEBOL member | | | | | | | | |
| (Chile) 1926 | Not a CONMEBOL member | | | | | | | | |
| (Peru) 1927 | Not a CONMEBOL member | | | | | | | | |
| (Argentina) 1929 | Not a CONMEBOL member | | | | | | | | |
| (Peru) 1935 | Not a CONMEBOL member | | | | | | | | |
| (Argentina) 1937 | Not a CONMEBOL member | | | | | | | | |
| (Peru) 1939 | Not a CONMEBOL member | | | | | | | | |
| (Chile) 1941 | Not a CONMEBOL member | | | | | | | | |
| (Uruguay) 1942 | Not a CONMEBOL member | | | | | | | | |
| (Chile) 1945 | Not a CONMEBOL member | | | | | | | | |
| (Argentina) 1946 | Not a CONMEBOL member | | | | | | | | |
| (Ecuador) 1947 | Not a CONMEBOL member | | | | | | | | |
| (Brazil) 1949 | Not a CONMEBOL member | | | | | | | | |
| (Peru) 1953 | Did not participate | | | | | | | | |
| (Chile) 1955 | Did not participate | | | | | | | | |
| (Uruguay) 1956 | Did not participate | | | | | | | | |
| (Peru) 1957 | Did not participate | | | | | | | | |
| (Argentina) 1959 | Did not participate | | | | | | | | |
| (Ecuador) 1959 | Did not participate | | | | | | | | |
| (Bolivia) 1963 | Did not participate | | | | | | | | |
| (Uruguay) 1967 | Fifth place | 5th | 5 | 1 | 0 | 4 | 7 | 16 | Squad |
| 1975 | Group stage | 10th | 4 | 0 | 0 | 4 | 1 | 26 | Squad |
| 1979 | Group stage | 10th | 4 | 0 | 2 | 2 | 1 | 12 | Squad |
| 1983 | Group stage | 10th | 4 | 0 | 1 | 3 | 1 | 10 | Squad |
| (Argentina) 1987 | Group stage | 10th | 2 | 0 | 0 | 2 | 1 | 8 | Squad |
| (Brazil) 1989 | Group stage | 10th | 4 | 0 | 1 | 3 | 4 | 11 | Squad |
| (Chile) 1991 | Group stage | 10th | 4 | 0 | 0 | 4 | 1 | 15 | Squad |
| (Ecuador) 1993 | Group stage | 11th | 3 | 0 | 2 | 1 | 6 | 11 | Squad |
| (Uruguay) 1995 | Group stage | 12th | 3 | 0 | 0 | 3 | 4 | 10 | Squad |
| (Bolivia) 1997 | Group stage | 12th | 3 | 0 | 0 | 3 | 0 | 5 | Squad |
| (Paraguay) 1999 | Group stage | 12th | 3 | 0 | 0 | 3 | 1 | 13 | Squad |
| (Colombia) 2001 | Group stage | 12th | 3 | 0 | 0 | 3 | 0 | 7 | Squad |
| (Peru) 2004 | Group stage | 11th | 3 | 0 | 1 | 2 | 2 | 5 | Squad |
| (Venezuela) 2007 | Quarter-finals | 6th | 4 | 1 | 2 | 1 | 5 | 6 | Squad |
| (Argentina) 2011 | Fourth place | 4th | 6 | 2 | 3 | 1 | 7 | 8 | Squad |
| (Chile) 2015 | Group stage | 9th | 3 | 1 | 0 | 2 | 2 | 3 | Squad |
| (United States) 2016 | Quarter-finals | 6th | 4 | 2 | 1 | 1 | 4 | 5 | Squad |
| (Brazil) 2019 | Quarter-finals | 7th | 4 | 1 | 2 | 1 | 3 | 3 | Squad |
| (Brazil) 2021 | Group stage | 9th | 4 | 0 | 2 | 2 | 2 | 6 | Squad |
| (United States) 2024 | Quarter-finals | 5th | 4 | 3 | 1 | 0 | 7 | 2 | Squad |
| Total | Fourth place | 20/27 | 74 | 11 | 18 | 45 | 59 | 182 | — |

=== Pan American Games ===
Pan American Games record
| Year | Round | Position | Pld | W | D | L | GF | GA |
|---|---|---|---|---|---|---|---|---|
| (Argentina) 1951 | Fourth place | 4th | 4 | 1 | 0 | 3 | 5 | 14 |
| (Mexico) 1955 | Fourth place | 4th | 6 | 1 | 2 | 3 | 9 | 20 |
| (United States) 1959 | Did not participate | | | | | | | |
| (Brazil) 1963 | Did not participate | | | | | | | |
| (Canada) 1967 | Did not participate | | | | | | | |
| (Colombia) 1971 | Did not participate | | | | | | | |
| (Mexico) 1975 | Did not participate | | | | | | | |
| (Puerto Rico) 1979 | Did not participate | | | | | | | |
| (Venezuela) 1983 | Group stage | 7th | 2 | 1 | 0 | 1 | 3 | 3 |
| (United States) 1987 | Did not qualify | | | | | | | |
| (Cuba) 1991 | Did not qualify | | | | | | | |
| (Argentina) 1995 | Did not qualify | | | | | | | |
| Since 1999 | See Venezuela national under-23 football team | | | | | | | |
| Total | Fourth place | 3/12 | 12 | 3 | 2 | 7 | 17 | 37 |

== Honours ==
=== Regional ===
- Bolivarian Games
  - (silver) Silver medal (5): 1947–48^{s}, 1951, 1965, 1970, 1977
  - (bronze) Bronze medal (2): 1961, 1981

Friendly

- FIFA Series
  - (silver) Runner-up (1): 2026 Uzbekistan

Notes

- ^{s} Shared titles.

== See also ==
- Venezuela national under-23 football team
- Venezuela national under-20 football team
- Venezuela national under-17 football team
- Venezuela national futsal team
