= 1967 South American Championship =

Football tournament

Tournament details
- Host country: Uruguay
- Dates: 17 January – 2 February 1967
- Teams: 6
- Venue(s): Estadio Centenario, Montevideo

Final positions
- Champions: Uruguay (11th title)
- Runners-up: Argentina
- Third place: Chile
- Fourth place: Paraguay

Tournament statistics
- Matches played: 15
- Goals scored: 49 (3.27 per match)
- Top scorer: (Argentina) Luis Artime (5 goals)

The 1967 South American Championship (Spanish: Campeonato Sudamericano 1967) was the 29th international association football championship for members of the Confederación Sudamericana de Fútbol (CONMEBOL). Hosted by Uruguay, the competition ran from 17 January – 2 February 1967 and was contested by the national teams of Argentina, Bolivia, Chile, Paraguay, Uruguay and Venezuela. It was the last edition of the competition before it was rebranded as the Copa América from the 1975 edition.

For the first time, a qualification tournament was held to reduce the total number of teams competing in the final tournament. Hosts Uruguay were crowned champions for the 11th time after defeating Argentina 1–0 in the final and decisive match of the round-robin tournament.

== Background ==
In 1910, the Asociación del Fútbol Argentino (AFA) organised a tournament to mark the 100th anniversary of the May Revolution. The Copa Centenario Revolución de Mayo was contested by the national teams of Argentina, Chile and Uruguay and is considered to be a precursor to the South American Championship. Six years later, the AFA organised a second tournament, this time to celebrate the centenary of the Argentine Declaration of Independence. Alongside the three who had contested the Copa Centenario Revolución de Mayo, Brazil were invited to compete and the South American Championship was born. During the competition, the four associations of the competing teams met on 9 July 1916 and founded the Confederación Sudamericana de Fútbol (CONMEBOL).

Bolivia were the defending champions having won the 1963 edition after defeating Brazil 5–4 in the final and decisive round of matches. Argentina were the most successful team in the history of the competition having won the trophy on 12 occasions.

Venezuela would compete in the competition for the first time, bringing the total number of competitors to 10. As a result, a qualifying tournament was organised for the first time to reduce the number contesting the final tournament. However, Brazil and Peru withdrew prior to the start of the competition so only eight of the 10 CONMEBOL members would compete.

== Format ==
In the qualifying round, four teams were drawn to contest two two-legged ties. The team scoring the higher number of goals would qualify for the final tournament.

The final tournament was played as a round-robin where each team would play all of the others once. The winner would be decided by the total number of points obtained across all matches played. Should two or more teams be tied with the greatest number of points, a play-off would be organised to decide the winner.

== Qualifying round ==
The qualifying round began on 30 November 1966 when Chile defeated Colombia 5–2 in the first leg. In the second leg 11 days later, the teams played out a goalless draw and Chile qualified for the final tournament 5–2 on aggregate. On 21 December, Paraguay came from 2–0 down to draw 2–2 with Ecuador in the first leg. In the second leg a week later, Paraguay won 3–1 to qualify for the final tournament 5–3 on aggregate.

Qualifying round
Team 1	Agg.	Team 2	1st leg	2nd leg
Chile	5–2	Colombia	5–2	0–0
Ecuador	3–5	Paraguay	2–2	1–3

=== Results ===
30 November 1966

Chile	5–2	Colombia
Araya 7'; Prieto 23'; Castro 40' (pen.), 49'; Saavedra 61'		Gamboa 71'; Cañón 72'

Estadio Nacional, Santiago
Attendance: 80,000
Referee: Yamasaki (Peru)
11 December 1966

Colombia	0–0	Chile

Estadio El Campín, Bogotá
Attendance: 17,000
Referee: Yamasaki (Peru)

Chile won 5–2 on aggregate.

21 December 1966

Ecuador	2–2	Paraguay
Carrera 56'; Muñoz 58'		Rojas 85' (pen.); Apodaca 88'

Estadio Modelo, Guayaquil
Attendance: 47,000
Referee: Goicoechea (Argentina)
28 December 1966

Paraguay	3–1	Ecuador
Mora 7', 10'; Del Puerto 60'		Muñoz 81'

Estadio Manuel Ferreira, Asunción
Attendance: 25,000
Referee: Orozco (Peru)

Paraguay won 5–3 on aggregate.

== Venue ==
All matches were held at the Estadio Centenario in Montevideo.

Montevideo
Estadio Centenario
Capacity: 65,235
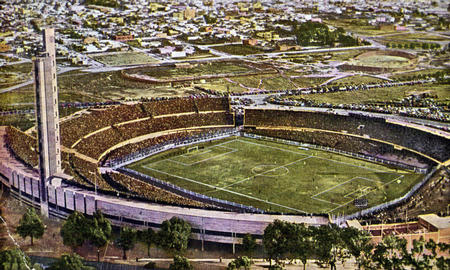

== Summary ==
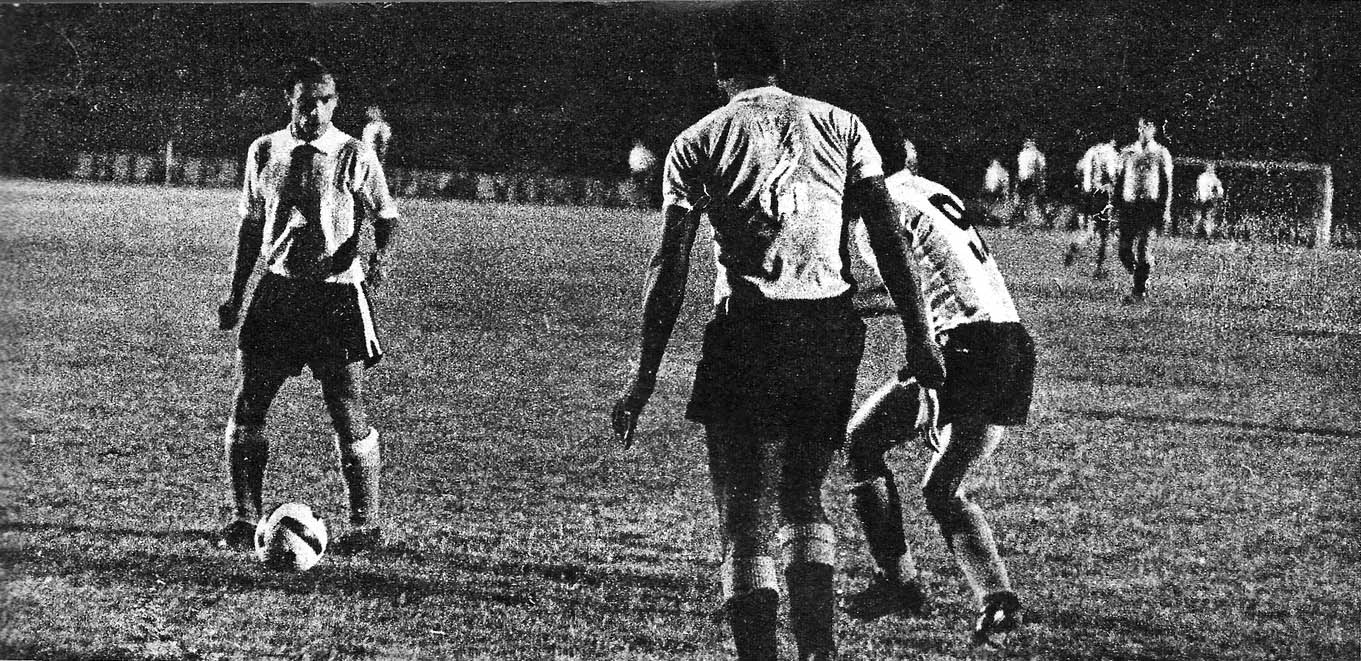
Uruguay v Argentina, the final match of the round

The competition began on 13 January when Uruguay defeated defending champions Bolivia 4–0. Five days later, Chile defeated Venezuela 2–0 and Argentina won 4–1 against Paraguay. On 21 January, Uruguay again won 4–0, this time against Venezuela. The following day, Argentina defeated Bolivia 1–0 and Chile defeated Paraguay 4–2. On 25 January, Paraguay defeated Bolivia 1–0 and Argentina won 5–1 against Venezuela. The following day, Uruguay and Chile drew 2–2. At the half way stage, three teams remained unbeaten. Argentina led the way with six points from six, one clear of Chile and Uruguay.

On 28 January, Venezuela recorded their first win of the competition by defeating Bolivia 3–0 and Chile's unbeaten start was ended by Argentina who won 2–0 and extended their lead at the top. The following day, Uruguay defeated Paraguay 2–0 which set up a winner-takes-all final match between Uruguay and Argentina. On 1 February, Chile and Bolivia played out a goalless draw and Paraguay defeated Venezuela 5–3. In the last match, the following day, Pedro Rocha scored the only goal of the match as Uruguay won 1–0 to win the competition for the 11th time.

== Table ==
Pos	Team	Pld	W	D	L	GF	GA	GD	Pts
1	Uruguay	5	4	1	0	13	2	+11	9
2	Argentina	5	4	0	1	12	3	+9	8
3	Chile	5	2	2	1	8	6	+2	6
4	Paraguay	5	2	0	3	9	13	−4	4
5	Venezuela	5	1	0	4	7	16	−9	2
6	Bolivia	5	0	1	4	0	9	−9	1

== Results ==
17 January 1967

Uruguay	4–0	Bolivia
Rocha 5'; Montero Castillo 44'; Troncoso 50' (o.g.); Oyarbide 81'

Centenario, Montevideo
Attendance: 10,800
Referee: Ramírez (Paraguay)

18 January 1967

Chile	2–0	Venezuela
Marcos 12', 41'

Centenario, Montevideo
Attendance: 7,000
Referee: Ramírez (Paraguay)
18 January 1967

Argentina	4–1	Paraguay
Mas 3'; Bernao 71'; Artime 73'; Albrecht 89' (pen.)		Mora 67'

Centenario, Montevideo
Attendance: 12,000
Referee: Gasc (Chile)

21 January 1967

Uruguay	4–0	Venezuela
Urruzmendi 5', 81'; Oyarbide 62', 68'

Centenario, Montevideo
Attendance: 6,334
Referee: De Queiroz (Brazil)

22 January 1967

Chile	4–2	Paraguay
Gallardo 9', 44'; Araya 72', 81'		Riveros 5'; Apodaca 85'

Centenario, Montevideo
Attendance: 6,000
Referee: Goicochea (Argentina)
22 January 1967

Argentina	1–0	Bolivia
Bernao 67'

Centenario, Montevideo
Attendance: 6,000
Referee: De Queiroz (Brazil)

25 January 1967

Paraguay	1–0	Bolivia
Del Puerto 14'

Centenario, Montevideo
Attendance: 5,000
Referee: Marino (Chile)
25 January 1967

Argentina	5–1	Venezuela
Artime 18', 65', 88'; Carone 31'; Marzolini 53'		Santana 72'

Centenario, Montevideo
Attendance: 2,500
Referee: Gasc (Chile)

26 January 1967

Uruguay	2–2	Chile
Rocha 15' (pen.); Oyarbide 68'		Gallardo 2'; Marcos 37'

Centenario, Montevideo
Attendance: 22,381
Referee: Ramírez (Paraguay)

28 January 1967

Venezuela	3–0	Bolivia
Ravelo 59', 84'; Santana 67'

Centenario, Montevideo
Attendance: 11,000
Referee: Gasc (Chile)
28 January 1967

Argentina	2–0	Chile
Sarnari 36'; Artime 80'

Centenario, Montevideo
Attendance: 14,000
Referee: Ramírez (Paraguay)

29 January 1967

Uruguay	2–0	Paraguay
Pérez 32'; Urruzmendi 66'

Centenario, Montevideo
Attendance: 11,973
Referee: Gasc (Chile)

1 February 1967

Paraguay	5–3	Venezuela
Mora 11', 22'; Rojas 16', 29'; Colmán 81'		Mendoza 3'; Santana 32'; Scovino 89'

Centenario, Montevideo
Attendance: 1,500
Referee: Marino (Chile)
1 February 1967

Chile	0–0	Bolivia

Centenario, Montevideo
Attendance: 1,500
Referee: Goicochea (Argentina)

2 February 1967

Uruguay	1–0	Argentina
Rocha 74'

Centenario, Montevideo
Attendance: 65,000
Referee: Gasc (Chile)

== Goalscorers ==
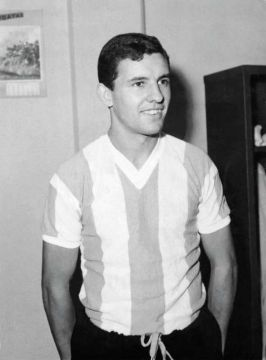
Luis Artime, top scorer

There were 49 goals scored in 15 matches, for an average of 3.27 goals per match.

5 goals

- (Argentina) Luis Artime

4 goals

- (Uruguay) Jorge Oyarbide

3 goals

- (Chile) Julio Gallardo
- (Chile) Rubén Marcos
- (Uruguay) José Urruzmendi
- (Uruguay) Pedro Rocha
- (Venezuela) Rafael Santana

2 goals

- (Argentina) Raúl Bernao
- (Chile) Pedro Araya
- (Paraguay) Celino Mora
- (Paraguay) Juan Carlos Rojas
- (Venezuela) Antonio Ravelo

1 goal

- (Argentina) Juan Carlos Carone
- (Argentina) Juan Carlos Sarnari
- (Argentina) Oscar Mas
- (Argentina) Rafael Albrecht
- (Argentina) Silvio Marzolini
- (Paraguay) Antonio González
- (Paraguay) Arístides Del Puerto
- (Paraguay) Benigno Apocada
- (Paraguay) Juan Francisco Riveros
- (Paraguay) Ramón Colmán
- (Uruguay) Domingo Pérez
- (Uruguay) Julio Montero Castillo
- (Venezuela) Humberto Scovino
- (Venezuela) Luis Mendoza

1 own goal

- (Bolivia) Roberto Troncoso (against Uruguay)
