= 1979 Copa América squads =

List of footballers

These are the squads for the countries that played in the 1979 Copa América. The first round was played in three groups of three teams with Peru, receiving a bye to the semi-finals.

== Group A ==
=== Chile ===
Coach: Luis Santibáñez

No.	Pos.	Player	Date of birth (age)	Caps	Club
	GK	Mario Osbén	14 July 1955 (aged 24)		(Chile) Unión Española
	GK	Oscar Wirth	5 November 1955 (aged 23)		(Chile) Colo-Colo
	DF	Eduardo Bonvallet	13 January 1955 (aged 24)		(Chile) O'Higgins
	DF	Enzo Escobar	10 November 1951 (aged 27)		(Chile) Unión Española
	DF	Elías Figueroa	25 October 1946 (aged 32)		(Chile) Palestino
	DF	Mario Galindo	10 August 1951 (aged 27)		(Chile) Colo-Colo
	DF	Raúl González	2 December 1955 (aged 23)		(Chile) Palestino
	DF	Alberto Quintano	26 April 1946 (aged 33)		U. de Chile
	DF	René Valenzuela	20 April 1955 (aged 24)		(Chile) O'Higgins
	MF	Rodolfo Dubó	11 September 1953 (aged 25)		(Chile) Palestino
	MF	Miguel Ángel Neira	9 October 1952 (aged 26)		(Chile) O'Higgins
	MF	Carlos Rivas	24 May 1953 (aged 26)		(Chile) Colo-Colo
	MF	Manuel Rojas	13 June 1954 (aged 25)		(Chile) Palestino
	FW	Mario Soto	10 July 1950 (aged 29)		(Chile) Cobreloa
	FW	Oscar Fabbiani	17 December 1950 (aged 28)		(Chile) Palestino
	FW	Carlos Caszely	5 July 1950 (aged 29)		(Chile) Colo-Colo
	FW	Víctor Estay	24 February 1951 (aged 28)		(Chile) Unión Española
	FW	Jorge Peredo	17 February 1953 (aged 26)		(Chile) Unión Española
	FW	Waldo Quiroz	10 September 1949 (aged 29)		(Chile) O'Higgins
	FW	Leonardo Véliz	3 September 1945 (aged 33)		(Chile) Colo-Colo
	FW	Patricio Yáñez	20 January 1961 (aged 18)		(Chile) San Luis Quillota

=== Colombia ===
Head Coach: (Socialist Federal Republic of Yugoslavia) Blagoje Vidinić

No.	Pos.	Player	Date of birth (age)	Caps	Club
	GK	James Mina	17 July 1954 (aged 24)		(Colombia) Independiente Santa Fe
	GK	Heberth Ríos	28 September 1956 (aged 22)		(Colombia) Once Caldas
	GK	Pedro Zape	3 June 1949 (aged 30)		(Colombia) Deportivo Cali
	DF	Oscar Bolaño	14 April 1951 (aged 28)		(Colombia) Atlético Junior
	DF	Fernando Castro	11 February 1949 (aged 30)		(Colombia) Deportivo Cali
	DF	Miguel Escobar	18 April 1945 (aged 34)		(Colombia) Deportivo Cali
	DF	Miguel Prince	30 July 1957 (aged 21)		(Colombia) Atlético Bucaramanga
	DF	Luis Eduardo Reyes	27 January 1954 (aged 25)		(Colombia) América de Cali
	MF	José Chaparro	2 July 1954 (aged 25)		(Colombia) América de Cali
	MF	Hernán Herrera	28 October 1957 (aged 21)		(Colombia) Atlético Nacional
	DF	Luis Fernando López			(Colombia) Independiente Santa Fe
	MF	Víctor Lugo	15 April 1954 (aged 25)		(Colombia) América de Cali
	MF	Álvaro Muñoz Castro	17 May 1954 (aged 25)		(Colombia) América de Cali
	MF	Rafael Otero	14 December 1954 (aged 24)		(Colombia) Deportivo Cali
	MF	César Valverde	23 August 1951 (aged 27)		(Colombia) Deportivo Cali
	FW	Rafael Agudelo	30 October 1960 (aged 18)		(Colombia) Deportivo Cali
	FW	Ernesto Díaz	13 September 1952 (aged 26)		(Colombia) Atlético Junior
	FW	Arnoldo Iguarán	18 January 1957 (aged 22)		(Colombia) Cúcuta Deportivo
	FW	Jaime Morón	16 November 1950 (aged 28)		(Colombia) Millonarios
	MF	Willington Ortiz	26 March 1952 (aged 27)		(Colombia) Millonarios
	FW	Alex Valderrama	1 October 1960 (aged 18)		(Colombia) Unión Magdalena
	FW	Eduardo Vilarete	20 June 1953 (aged 26)		(Colombia) Atlético Nacional

=== Venezuela ===
Head Coach: (Uruguay) Walter Roque

No.	Pos.	Player	Date of birth (age)	Caps	Club
	GK	Andrés Arizaleta	23 December 1950 (aged 28)		(Venezuela) Atlético Zamora
	GK	César Semidey	3 October 1954 (aged 24)		(Venezuela) Deportivo Táchira
	GK	Vicente Vega	21 February 1955 (aged 24)		(Venezuela) Portuguesa FC
	DF	Pedro Javier Acosta	28 November 1959 (aged 19)		(Venezuela) Deportivo Galicia
	DF	Ordan Aguirre	15 February 1955 (aged 24)		(Venezuela) Lara
	DF	Emilio Campos	22 August 1954 (aged 24)		(Venezuela) Universidad de Los Andes
	DF	Johnny Castellanos	24 December 1957 (aged 21)		(Venezuela) Atlético Zamora
	DF	Pedro Castro Eiroa	15 November 1947 (aged 31)		(Venezuela) Deportivo Galicia
	DF	José Ramón Contreras			(Venezuela) Deportivo Táchira
	DF	Juan José Vidal	29 May 1959 (aged 20)		(Venezuela) Deportivo Italia
	MF	Bernardo Añor	7 October 1959 (aged 19)		(Venezuela) Bingo
	MF	Plinio Araque	30 November 1954 (aged 24)		(Venezuela) Estudiantes de Mérida
	MF	Rafael Cadenas	8 September 1958 (aged 20)		(Venezuela) Universidad de Los Andes
	MF	Luis Mendoza	21 June 1945 (aged 34)		(Venezuela) Deportivo Italia
	MF	Richard Páez	31 December 1952 (aged 26)		(Venezuela) Deportivo Táchira
	MF	Asdrúbal Sánchez	1 April 1958 (aged 21)		(Venezuela) Universidad de Los Andes
	FW	Rodolfo Carvajal	8 February 1952 (aged 27)		(Venezuela) Universidad de Los Andes
	FW	Ángel Castillo	18 April 1957 (aged 22)		(Venezuela) Valencia FC
	FW	Pedro Febles	18 April 1958 (aged 21)		(Venezuela) Deportivo Italia
	FW	Julio César Hernández	6 October 1951 (aged 27)		(Venezuela) Estudiantes de Mérida
	FW	Alexis Peña	1 July 1956 (aged 23)		(Venezuela) Universidad de Los Andes
	FW	Rafael Santana	1 December 1944 (aged 34)		(Venezuela) Deportivo Portugués

== Group B ==
=== Argentina ===
Head Coach: (Argentina) César Luis Menotti

No.	Pos.	Player	Date of birth (age)	Caps	Club
1	GK	Ricardo Ferrero	5 April 1955 (aged 24)		(Argentina) Rosario Central
2	GK	Julio César Falcioni	20 July 1956 (aged 22)		(Argentina) Vélez Sarsfield
3	GK	Enrique Vidallé	7 May 1952 (aged 27)		(Argentina) Gimnasia y Esgrima La Plata
11	DF	Miguel Bordón	27 October 1952 (aged 26)		(Argentina) Boca Juniors
10	DF	Juan Bujedo	6 March 1956 (aged 23)		(Argentina) Vélez Sarsfield
14	DF	Pedro Larraquy	13 June 1956 (aged 23)		(Argentina) Vélez Sarsfield
5	DF	Victorio Ocaño	9 June 1954 (aged 25)		(Argentina) Talleres de Córdoba
8	DF	Daniel Passarella	25 May 1953 (aged 26)		(Argentina) River Plate
4	DF	Eduardo Saporiti	29 December 1954 (aged 24)		(Argentina) River Plate
9	DF	José Van Tuyne	13 December 1954 (aged 24)		(Argentina) Rosario Central
15	MF	Juan Barbas	23 August 1959 (aged 19)		(Argentina) Racing Club
22	MF	Ricardo Bochini	25 January 1954 (aged 25)		(Argentina) Independiente
7	MF	José Luis Gaitán	7 September 1957 (aged 21)		(Argentina) Rosario Central
19	MF	Américo Gallego	25 April 1955 (aged 24)		(Argentina) Newell's Old Boys
12	MF	Jorge Gáspari	3 November 1958 (aged 20)		(Argentina) Quilmes
16	MF	Carlos Ángel López	17 July 1952 (aged 26)		(Argentina) Racing Club
6	MF	Diego Maradona	30 October 1960 (aged 18)		(Argentina) Argentinos Juniors
13	MF	José Daniel Valencia	3 October 1955 (aged 23)		(Argentina) Talleres de Córdoba
17	FW	José Antonio Castro	15 October 1955 (aged 23)		(Argentina) Vélez Sarsfield
18	FW	Hugo Coscia	12 October 1952 (aged 26)		(Argentina) San Lorenzo
23	FW	Miguel Ángel Torres	19 July 1954 (aged 24)		(Argentina) San Lorenzo
20	FW	Roberto Díaz	3 March 1953 (aged 26)		(Argentina) Racing Club
24	MF	Patricio Hernández	16 August 1956 (aged 22)		(Argentina) Estudiantes La Plata
25	MF	Eduardo Bacas	20 December 1953 (aged 25)		(Argentina) Rosario Central
21	FW	Sergio Fortunato	23 October 1956 (aged 22)		(Argentina) Estudiantes La Plata

=== Bolivia ===
Coach: Ramiro Blacut

No.	Pos.	Player	Date of birth (age)	Caps	Club
	GK	Hebert Hoyos	29 April 1956 (aged 23)		(Bolivia) Oriente Petrolero
	GK	Carlos Conrado Jiménez	10 February 1948 (aged 31)		(Bolivia) Bolivar
	DF	Rogelio Delfín	4 September 1955 (aged 23)		(Bolivia) Always Ready
	DF	Windsor del Llano	18 August 1949 (aged 29)		(Bolivia) The Strongest
	DF	Erwin Espinosa	27 July 1954 (aged 24)		(Bolivia) Oriente Petrolero
	MF	Aldo Fierro	19 June 1954 (aged 25)		(Bolivia) Bolivar
	MF	Edgar Vaca	2 May 1956 (aged 23)		(Bolivia) Blooming
	MF	Ramiro Vargas	22 October 1958 (aged 20)		(Bolivia) Bolivar
	MF	Eduardo Angulo	2 March 1953 (aged 26)		(Bolivia) The Strongest
	MF	Carlos Aragonés	16 February 1956 (aged 23)		(Bolivia) Bolivar
	MF	Pablo Baldivieso	30 June 1949 (aged 30)		(Bolivia) Deportivo Municipal
	MF	Carlos Fernando Borja	25 December 1956 (aged 22)		(Bolivia) Bolivar
	MF	Luis González Roca	30 January 1958 (aged 21)		(Bolivia) Oriente Petrolero
	MF	David Paniagua	30 April 1959 (aged 20)		(Bolivia) The Strongest
	MF	Erwin Romero	27 July 1957 (aged 21)		(Bolivia) Oriente Petrolero
	FW	Miguel Aguilar	29 September 1953 (aged 25)		(Bolivia) The Strongest
	FW	Ovidio Messa	12 December 1952 (aged 26)		(Bolivia) The Strongest
	FW	Jesús Reynaldo	22 May 1954 (aged 25)		(Bolivia) Bolivar

=== Brazil ===
Head Coach: Cláudio Coutinho

No.	Pos.	Player	Date of birth (age)	Caps	Club
1	GK	Émerson Leão	11 July 1949 (aged 29)		(Brazil) Vasco da Gama
2	DF	Toninho	7 June 1948 (aged 31)		(Brazil) Flamengo
26	DF	Oscar	20 June 1954 (aged 25)		(Brazil) Ponte Preta
3	DF	Amaral	25 December 1954 (aged 24)		(Brazil) Corinthians
4	DF	Edinho	5 June 1955 (aged 24)		(Brazil) Fluminense
23	DF	Júnior	29 June 1954 (aged 25)		(Brazil) Flamengo
6	DF	Marco Antônio	6 February 1951 (aged 28)		(Brazil) Vasco da Gama
24	FW	Nílton Batata	5 November 1954 (aged 24)		(Brazil) Santos
15	MF	Carlos Alberto Pintinho	26 May 1955 (aged 24)		(Brazil) Vasco da Gama
17	MF	Jair	11 June 1953 (aged 26)		(Brazil) Internacional
8	MF	Paulo Roberto Falcão	16 October 1953 (aged 25)		(Brazil) Internacional
9	MF	Sócrates	19 February 1954 (aged 25)		(Brazil) Corinthians
30	MF	Zico	3 March 1953 (aged 26)		(Brazil) Flamengo
25	FW	Éder	25 May 1957 (aged 22)		(Brazil) Grêmio
12	GK	Carlos	4 March 1956 (aged 23)		(Brazil) Ponte Preta
13	DF	Nelinho	26 July 1950 (aged 28)		(Brazil) Cruzeiro
14	DF	Rondinelli	26 April 1954 (aged 25)		(Brazil) Flamengo
28	MF	Batista	8 March 1955 (aged 24)		(Brazil) Internacional
18	MF	Chicão	30 January 1949 (aged 30)		(Brazil) São Paulo
16	DF	Pedrinho	22 October 1957 (aged 21)		(Brazil) Palmeiras
5	MF	Paulo César Carpegiani	7 February 1949 (aged 30)		(Brazil) Flamengo
20	MF	Zenon	31 March 1954 (aged 25)		(Brazil) Guarani
10	FW	Palhinha	11 June 1950 (aged 29)		(Brazil) Corinthians
29	FW	Roberto Dinamite	13 April 1954 (aged 25)		(Brazil) Vasco da Gama
11	FW	Zé Sérgio	8 March 1957 (aged 22)		(Brazil) São Paulo
19	FW	Juary	16 June 1959 (aged 20)		(Brazil) Santos
7	FW	Tita	1 April 1958 (aged 21)		(Brazil) Flamengo
31	MF	Renato	21 February 1957 (aged 22)		(Brazil) São Paulo
34	FW	Tarciso	15 September 1951 (aged 27)		(Brazil) Grêmio
21	FW	Zezé	30 June 1957 (aged 22)		(Brazil) Fluminense
27	DF	Gomes	9 September 1956 (aged 22)		(Brazil) Guarani
22	GK	João Leite	13 October 1955 (aged 23)		(Brazil) Atlético Mineiro
33	MF	Adílio	15 May 1956 (aged 23)		(Brazil) Flamengo
35	MF	Toninho Cerezo	21 April 1955 (aged 24)		(Brazil) Atlético Mineiro
32	MF	Pita	4 August 1958 (aged 20)		(Brazil) Santos
36	FW	João Paulo	15 June 1957 (aged 22)		(Brazil) Santos
37	FW	Serginho	23 December 1953 (aged 25)		(Brazil) São Paulo

== Group C ==
=== Ecuador ===
Head Coach: Héctor Morales

No.	Pos.	Player	Date of birth (age)	Caps	Club
	GK	Carlos Omar Delgado	7 February 1949 (aged 30)		(Ecuador) El Nacional
	GK	Milton Rodríguez	9 July 1954 (aged 25)		(Chile) Rangers de Talca
	DF	Luis Escalante	19 January 1945 (aged 34)		(Ecuador) El Nacional
	DF	Ecuador Figuerora	18 March 1953 (aged 26)		(Ecuador) El Nacional
	DF	Fausto Klinger	15 April 1953 (aged 26)		(Ecuador) Barcelona
4	DF	José Paes	29 December 1954 (aged 24)		(Ecuador) América
	DF	Miguel Oswaldo Pérez	8 March 1945 (aged 34)		(Ecuador) El Nacional
2	DF	Flavio Perlaza	7 October 1951 (aged 27)		(Ecuador) El Nacional
	MF	Luis Granda	2 July 1955 (aged 24)		(Ecuador) El Nacional
	MF	Carlos Ron	16 December 1953 (aged 25)		(Ecuador) El Nacional
	MF	Carlos Torres	15 August 1951 (aged 27)		(Ecuador) Emelec
	MF	José Villafuerte	27 November 1956 (aged 22)		(Ecuador) El Nacional
10	FW	Jorge Alarcón	8 February 1956 (aged 23)		(Ecuador) LDU
	FW	Hugo Barrera Segovia	11 November 1948 (aged 30)		(Ecuador) LDU
	FW	Juan Madruñero	26 April 1954 (aged 25)		(Ecuador) Barcelona
	FW	Cristóbal Mantilla	28 November 1949 (aged 29)		(Ecuador) Universidad Católica
	FW	Roque Párraga	18 November 1952 (aged 26)		(Ecuador) América
	FW	Vinicio Ron	26 February 1954 (aged 25)		(Ecuador) El Nacional
	FW	Mario Tenorio	21 August 1957 (aged 21)		(Ecuador) Deportivo Cuenca

=== Paraguay ===
Head Coach: Ranulfo Miranda

No.	Pos.	Player	Date of birth (age)	Caps	Club
	GK	Alcides Báez	17 January 1947 (aged 32)		(Paraguay) Libertad
	GK	Roberto Fernández	9 July 1954 (aged 25)		(Paraguay) Cerro Porteño
	DF	Alejandrino Arce	11 August 1955 (aged 23)		(Paraguay) Nacional
	DF	Cristín Cibils	13 March 1956 (aged 23)		(Paraguay) Atlético Tembetary
	DF	Juan Espínola	12 June 1953 (aged 26)		(Paraguay) Libertad
	DF	Gerónimo Ovelar	30 September 1951 (aged 28)		(Paraguay) Cerro Porteño
	DF	Roberto Paredes	2 December 1956 (aged 22)		(Paraguay) Olimpia
	DF	Juan Ramón Sandoval			(Paraguay) River Plate
	DF	Alicio Solalinde	1 February 1952 (aged 27)		(Paraguay) Olimpia
	DF	Flaminio Sosa	24 January 1946 (aged 33)		(Paraguay) Olimpia
	DF	Juan Torales	9 March 1956 (aged 23)		(Paraguay) Sportivo Luqueño
	DF	Juan Manuel Villalba	14 April 1954 (aged 25)		(Paraguay) Libertad
	MF	Osvaldo Aquino	28 January 1952 (aged 27)		(Paraguay) Olimpia
	MF	Arecio Colmán	10 June 1951 (aged 28)		(Paraguay) Libertad
	MF	Adalberto Escobar	23 April 1949 (aged 30)		(Paraguay) Libertad
	MF	Aldo Florentín	10 November 1957 (aged 21)		(Paraguay) Cerro Porteño
	MF	Carlos Kiese	1 June 1957 (aged 22)		(Paraguay) Olimpia
	MF	Juvencio Osorio	1 June 1950 (aged 29)		(Paraguay) Cerro Porteño
	MF	Mariano Pesoa	30 April 1952 (aged 27)		(Paraguay) Cerro Porteño
	MF	Romerito	28 August 1960 (aged 18)		(Paraguay) Sportivo Luqueño
	MF	Hugo Talavera	31 October 1949 (aged 29)		(Paraguay) Olimpia
	MF	Luis Ernesto Torres	7 November 1952 (aged 26)		(Paraguay) Olimpia
	MF	Tito Vera	1 April 1952 (aged 26)		(Paraguay) Libertad
	FW	Isabelino Acosta	2 December 1956 (aged 22)		(Paraguay) Sol de América
	FW	Roberto Cabañas	11 April 1961 (aged 18)		(Paraguay) Cerro Porteño
	FW	Pedro Fleitas	11 July 1953 (aged 25)		(Paraguay) Cerro Porteño
	FW	Evaristo Isasi	26 October 1955 (aged 23)		(Paraguay) Olimpia
	FW	Arsenio Meza	22 January 1953 (aged 26)		(Paraguay) River Plate
	FW	Eugenio Morel	1 January 1950 (aged 29)		(Paraguay) Libertad
	FW	Milcíades Morel	9 September 1953 (aged 25)		(Paraguay) Libertad
	FW	Amado Pérez	24 June 1959 (aged 20)		(Paraguay) Sol de América
	FW	Enrique Villalba	2 January 1955 (aged 24)		(Paraguay) Olimpia

=== Uruguay ===
Head Coach: Roque Máspoli

No.	Pos.	Player	Date of birth (age)	Caps	Club
20	GK	Freddy Clavijo	3 May 1955 (aged 23)		(Uruguay) Defensor
1	GK	Rodolfo Rodríguez	20 January 1956 (aged 23)		(Uruguay) Nacional
24	DF	Domingo Cáceres	7 September 1959 (aged 19)		(Uruguay) Peñarol
4	DF	Hugo de León	27 February 1958 (aged 21)		(Uruguay) Nacional
3	DF	Víctor Diogo	9 April 1958 (aged 21)		(Uruguay) Peñarol
26	DF	Washington González	6 December 1955 (aged 23)		(Uruguay) Defensor
12	GK	Carlos Mario Goyén	14 August 1956 (aged 22)		(Uruguay) River Plate Montevideo
13	DF	Nelson Marcenaro	4 September 1952 (aged 26)		(Uruguay) Peñarol
15	DF	José Hermes Moreira	30 September 1958 (aged 20)		(Uruguay) Nacional
2	DF	José Luis Russo	14 July 1958 (aged 20)		(Uruguay) Defensor
23	DF	Mario Zoryez			(Uruguay) Peñarol
25	MF	Nelson Agresta	2 August 1955 (aged 23)		(Uruguay) Nacional
21	MF	Gary Castillo Farias			(Uruguay) Sud América
6	MF	Eduardo de la Peña	7 June 1955 (aged 24)		(Uruguay) Nacional
5	MF	Ildo Maneiro	4 August 1947 (aged 31)		(Uruguay) Peñarol
17	MF	Rubén Paz	8 August 1959 (aged 19)		(Uruguay) Peñarol
8	MF	Ember Quintas			(Uruguay) Sud América
18	MF	Mario Saralegui	24 April 1959 (aged 20)		(Uruguay) Peñarol
7	MF	Lorenzo Unanue	22 March 1953 (aged 26)		(Uruguay) Peñarol
16	MF	Ernesto Vargas	1 May 1961 (aged 18)		(Uruguay) Peñarol
9	FW	Daniel Alonso	18 April 1956 (aged 23)		(Uruguay) Liverpool
19	FW	Alberto Bica	11 February 1958 (aged 21)		(Uruguay) Nacional
14	FW	Denís Milar	20 August 1952 (aged 26)		(Uruguay) Nacional
10	FW	Washington Olivera	25 June 1954 (aged 25)		(Uruguay) Peñarol
11	FW	Venancio Ramos	20 June 1959 (aged 20)		(Uruguay) Peñarol
22	FW	Waldemar Victorino	22 May 1952 (aged 27)		(Uruguay) Nacional

== Semi-final ==
=== Peru ===
Coach: José Chiarella

No.	Pos.	Player	Date of birth (age)	Caps	Club
	GK	Eusebio Acasuzo	8 April 1952 (aged 27)		(Peru) Universitario
	DF	Héctor Chumpitaz	12 April 1944 (aged 35)		(Peru) Sporting Cristal
	DF	Rubén Toribio Díaz	17 April 1952 (aged 27)		(Peru) Sporting Cristal
	DF	Jaime Duarte	27 February 1955 (aged 24)		(Peru) Alianza Lima
	DF	José Navarro	24 September 1948 (aged 30)		(Peru) Sporting Cristal
	MF	César Cueto	16 June 1952 (aged 27)		(Colombia) Atlético Nacional
	MF	Raúl Gorriti	10 October 1956 (aged 22)		(Peru) Deportivo Municipal
	MF	Germán Leguía	2 January 1954 (aged 25)		(Peru) Universitario
	MF	Jorge Olaechea	27 August 1958 (aged 20)		(Peru) Alianza Lima
	MF	José Velásquez	4 June 1954 (aged 25)		(Colombia) Independiente Medellin
	FW	Guillermo La Rosa	6 June 1952 (aged 27)		(Peru) Alianza Lima
	FW	Ernesto Labarthe	2 June 1956 (aged 23)		(Peru) Sport Boys
	FW	Roberto Mosquera	21 August 1956 (aged 22)		(Peru) Sporting Cristal
	FW	Percy Rojas	16 September 1949 (aged 29)		(Peru) Sporting Cristal
	FW	Freddy Ravello	28 January 1955 (aged 24)		(Peru) Alianza Lima
