= 1975 Copa América squads =

List of footballers

These are the squads for the countries that played in the 1975 Copa América. The first round was played in three groups of three teams with Uruguay, receiving a bye to the semi-finals.

== Group A ==
=== Argentina ===
Head Coach: César Luis Menotti

| No. | Pos. | Player | Date of birth (age) | Caps | Club |
|---|---|---|---|---|---|
| | GK | Hugo Gatti | 19 August 1944 (aged 30) | | (Argentina) Unión |
| | DF | Daniel Killer | 21 December 1949 (aged 25) | | (Argentina) Rosario Central |
| | DF | Mario Killer | 15 August 1951 (aged 23) | | (Argentina) Rosario Central |
| | DF | José Luis Pavoni | 23 May 1954 (aged 21) | | (Argentina) Newell's Old Boys |
| | DF | Rafael Pavón | 5 December 1951 (aged 23) | | (Argentina) Belgrano de Córdoba |
| | DF | Andrés Rebottaro | 5 September 1952 (aged 22) | | (Argentina) Newell's Old Boys |
| | MF | Osvaldo Ardiles | 3 August 1952 (aged 22) | | (Argentina) Huracán |
| | MF | Julio Asad | 7 June 1953 (aged 22) | | (Argentina) Vélez Sarsfield |
| | MF | Américo Gallego | 25 April 1955 (aged 20) | | (Argentina) Newell's Old Boys |
| | MF | José Daniel Valencia | 3 October 1955 (aged 19) | | (Argentina) Talleres de Córdoba |
| | MF | Mario Zanabria | 1 October 1948 (aged 26) | | (Argentina) Newell's Old Boys |
| | FW | Mario Kempes | 15 July 1954 (aged 21) | | (Argentina) Rosario Central |
| | FW | Ramón Bóveda | 18 March 1949 (aged 26) | | (Argentina) Rosario Central |
| | FW | Leopoldo Luque | 3 May 1949 (aged 26) | | (Argentina) Unión |
| | FW | Jorge Valdano | 4 October 1955 (aged 19) | | (Argentina) Newell's Old Boys |

=== Brazil ===
Head Coach: Osvaldo Brandão

| No. | Pos. | Player | Date of birth (age) | Caps | Club |
|---|---|---|---|---|---|
| | GK | Waldir Peres | 2 January 1951 (aged 24) | | (Brazil) São Paulo |
| | GK | Raul Plassman | 27 September 1944 (aged 30) | | (Brazil) Cruzeiro |
| | GK | Careca | 26 September 1943 (aged 31) | | (Brazil) Atlético Mineiro |
| | DF | Getúlio | 26 February 1954 (aged 21) | | (Brazil) Atlético Mineiro |
| | DF | Miguel Ferreira | 20 September 1949 (aged 25) | | (Brazil) Vasco da Gama |
| | DF | Modesto Malachias | 20 March 1950 (aged 25) | | (Brazil) Atlético Mineiro |
| | DF | José Morais | 26 July 1948 (aged 26) | | (Brazil) Cruzeiro |
| | DF | Nelinho | 26 July 1950 (aged 24) | | (Brazil) Cruzeiro |
| | DF | Luís Antônio Neto | 3 November 1952 (aged 22) | | (Brazil) Caldense |
| | DF | Darci Menezes | 24 September 1949 (aged 25) | | (Brazil) Cruzeiro |
| | DF | Wilson Piazza | 25 February 1943 (aged 32) | | (Brazil) Cruzeiro |
| | DF | Luís Pereira | 21 June 1949 (aged 26) | | (Brazil) Palmeiras |
| | DF | Vanderlei Lázaro | 20 July 1947 (aged 28) | | (Brazil) Cruzeiro |
| | DF | Vantuir | 16 November 1949 (aged 25) | | (Brazil) Atlético Mineiro |
| | MF | Amaral | 25 December 1954 (aged 20) | | (Brazil) Guaraní |
| | MF | Ângelo | 31 May 1953 (aged 22) | | (Brazil) Atlético Mineiro |
| | MF | Danival | 5 November 1952 (aged 22) | | (Brazil) Atlético Mineiro |
| | MF | Vanderlei Paiva | 3 April 1946 (aged 29) | | (Brazil) Atlético Mineiro |
| | MF | Zé Carlos | 28 April 1945 (aged 30) | | (Brazil) Cruzeiro |
| | MF | Dirceu Lopes | 3 September 1946 (aged 28) | | (Brazil) Cruzeiro |
| | MF | Eduardo Amorim | 30 November 1950 (aged 24) | | (Brazil) Cruzeiro |
| | MF | Geraldo | 14 April 1954 (aged 21) | | (Brazil) Flamengo |
| | MF | Ivo Wortmann | 10 March 1949 (aged 26) | | (Brazil) America (RJ) |
| | FW | Joãozinho | 15 February 1954 (aged 21) | | (Brazil) Cruzeiro |
| | FW | Marcelo Oliveira | 4 March 1955 (aged 20) | | (Brazil) Atlético Mineiro |
| | FW | Cosme Campos | 21 December 1952 (aged 22) | | (Brazil) Atlético Mineiro |
| | FW | Palhinha | 11 June 1950 (aged 25) | | (Brazil) Cruzeiro |
| | FW | Reinaldo | 11 January 1957 (aged 18) | | (Brazil) Atlético Mineiro |
| | FW | Roberto Batata | 24 July 1949 (aged 25) | | (Brazil) Cruzeiro |
| | FW | Roberto Dinamite | 13 April 1954 (aged 21) | | (Brazil) Vasco da Gama |
| | FW | Romeu Evangelista | 27 March 1950 (aged 25) | | (Brazil) Atlético Mineiro |

=== Venezuela ===
Head Coach: José Julián Hernández

| No. | Pos. | Player | Date of birth (age) | Caps | Club |
|---|---|---|---|---|---|
| | GK | Andrés Arizaleta | 23 December 1950 (aged 24) | | (Venezuela) Portuguesa |
| | GK | Omar Colmenares | 2 April 1944 (aged 31) | | (Venezuela) Valencia FC |
| | GK | Vicente Vega | 21 February 1955 (aged 20) | | (Venezuela) Deportivo San Cristóbal |
| | DF | Pedro Castro Eiroa | 26 May 1950 (aged 25) | | (Venezuela) Deportivo Galicia |
| | DF | Luis Marquina | 12 November 1952 (aged 22) | | (Venezuela) Portuguesa |
| | DF | Omar Ochoa | 8 May 1952 (aged 23) | | (Venezuela) Portuguesa |
| | DF | Orlando Torres | 18 July 1946 (aged 29) | | (Venezuela) Deportivo Italia |
| | DF | Néstor Vázquez | | | (Venezuela) Deportivo Italia |
| | MF | Alejo González | | | (Venezuela) Deportivo Galicia |
| | MF | Luis Mendoza | 21 June 1945 (aged 30) | | (Venezuela) Deportivo Galicia |
| | MF | Richard Páez | 31 December 1952 (aged 22) | | (Venezuela) Estudiantes de Mérida |
| | MF | Delmán Useche | 21 June 1948 (aged 27) | | (Venezuela) Deportivo Galicia |
| | FW | José Acurzio | | | (Venezuela) Deportivo Portugués |
| | FW | Vicente Flores | 7 February 1955 (aged 20) | | (Venezuela) Portuguesa |
| | FW | Iván García | 18 April 1957 (aged 18) | | (Venezuela) Estudiantes de Mérida |
| | FW | Ramón Iriarte | 12 January 1948 (aged 27) | | (Venezuela) Deportivo Italia |
| | FW | Miguel Rivas | | | (Venezuela) Estudiantes de Mérida |
| | FW | Rubén Darío Torres | 26 October 1949 (aged 25) | | (Venezuela) Anzoátegui |

== Group B ==
=== Bolivia ===
Coach: Freddy Valda

| No. | Pos. | Player | Date of birth (age) | Caps | Club |
|---|---|---|---|---|---|
| | GK | Carlos Jiménez | 10 February 1948 (aged 27) | | (Bolivia) Bolivar |
| | DF | Windsor del Llano | 18 August 1949 (aged 25) | | (Bolivia) Jorge Wilstermann |
| | DF | Luis Iriondo | 15 December 1952 (aged 22) | | (Bolivia) The Strongest |
| | DF | Jaime Lima | 2 November 1949 (aged 25) | | (Bolivia) Bolivar |
| | DF | Mario Rojas | 8 September 1941 (aged 33) | | (Bolivia) San José |
| | MF | Eduardo Angulo | 2 March 1953 (aged 22) | | (Bolivia) The Strongest |
| | MF | Luis Liendo | 18 April 1949 (aged 26) | | (Bolivia) Bolivar |
| | MF | Nicolás Linares | 6 December 1945 (aged 29) | | (Bolivia) Deportivo Municipal |
| | MF | Jaime Rimazza | 12 December 1946 (aged 28) | | (Bolivia) Deportivo Municipal |
| | MF | Freddy Vargas | 13 January 1953 (aged 22) | | (Bolivia) Jorge Wilstermann |
| | FW | Juan Américo Díaz | 12 November 1944 (aged 30) | | (Bolivia) Bolivar |
| | FW | Juan Alfredo Farías | 25 December 1956 (aged 18) | | (Bolivia) The Strongest |
| | FW | Juan Carlos Fernández | 25 October 1946 (aged 28) | | (Bolivia) Bolivar |
| | FW | Porfirio Jiménez | 16 February 1952 (aged 23) | | (Bolivia) Guabirá |
| | FW | Ovidio Messa | 12 December 1952 (aged 22) | | (Bolivia) Bolivar |
| | FW | Mario Pariente | | | (Bolivia) The Strongest |
| | FW | Raúl Alberto Morales | 4 June 1951 (aged 24) | | (Bolivia) Bolivar |
| | FW | Juan Carlos Sánchez | 1 September 1956 (aged 18) | | (Argentina) Gimnasia y Esgrima de Jujuy |

=== Chile ===
Head Coach: Pedro Morales

| No. | Pos. | Player | Date of birth (age) | Caps | Club |
|---|---|---|---|---|---|
| | GK | Adolfo Nef | 18 January 1946 (aged 29) | | (Chile) Colo-Colo |
| | GK | Leopoldo Vallejos | 16 July 1944 (aged 31) | | (Chile) Unión Española |
| | DF | Juan Machuca | 7 March 1951 (aged 24) | | (Chile) Unión Española |
| | DF | Mario Galindo | 10 August 1951 (aged 23) | | (Chile) Colo-Colo |
| | DF | Mario Soto | 10 July 1950 (aged 25) | | (Chile) Unión Española |
| | DF | Leonel Herrera | 10 October 1948 (aged 26) | | (Chile) Colo-Colo |
| | MF | Daniel Díaz | 7 August 1948 (aged 26) | | (Chile) Huachipato |
| | MF | Rafael González | 24 April 1950 (aged 25) | | (Chile) Colo-Colo |
| | MF | Eddio Inostroza | 3 September 1946 (aged 28) | | (Chile) Unión Española |
| | MF | Alfonso Lara | 27 April 1946 (aged 29) | | (Chile) Colo-Colo |
| | MF | Francisco Las Heras | 21 August 1949 (aged 25) | | (Chile) Unión Española |
| | MF | Javier Méndez | 6 June 1949 (aged 26) | | (Chile) Deportes Aviación |
| | MF | Luis Araneda | 7 April 1953 (aged 22) | | (Chile) Colo-Colo |
| | MF | Carlos Reinoso | 7 March 1945 (aged 30) | | (Mexico) América |
| | FW | Miguel Ángel Gamboa | 21 June 1951 (aged 24) | | (Chile) Colo-Colo |
| | FW | Julio Crisosto | 21 March 1950 (aged 25) | | (Chile) Colo-Colo |
| | FW | Jorge Spedaletti | 24 September 1947 (aged 27) | | (Chile) Unión Española |
| | FW | Francisco Valdés | 19 March 1943 (aged 32) | | (Chile) Colo-Colo |
| | FW | Sergio Ahumada | 2 October 1948 (aged 26) | | (Chile) Unión Española |
| | FW | Leonardo Véliz | 3 September 1945 (aged 29) | | (Chile) Unión Española |

=== Peru ===
Head Coach: Marcos Calderón

| No. | Pos. | Player | Date of birth (age) | Caps | Club |
|---|---|---|---|---|---|
| 12 | GK | Eusebio Acasuzo | 8 April 1952 (aged 23) | | (Peru) Unión Huaral |
| 1 | GK | Ottorino Sartor | 18 September 1945 (aged 29) | | (Peru) Universitario |
| 21 | GK | José González Ganoza | 10 July 1954 (aged 21) | | (Peru) Alianza Lima |
| 2 | DF | Eleazar Soria | 11 January 1948 (aged 27) | | (Argentina) Independiente |
| 4 | DF | Héctor Chumpitaz | 12 April 1943 (aged 32) | | (Peru) Universitario |
| 5 | DF | Rubén Toribio Díaz | 17 April 1952 (aged 23) | | (Peru) Sporting Cristal |
| 3 | DF | Julio Meléndez | 11 April 1942 (aged 33) | | (Peru) Juan Aurich |
| 13 | DF | José Navarro | 24 September 1948 (aged 26) | | (Peru) Sporting Cristal |
| 8 | MF | Santiago Ojeda | 26 April 1951 (aged 24) | | (Peru) Alianza Lima |
| 14 | MF | César Cueto | 6 June 1952 (aged 23) | | (Peru) Alianza Lima |
| 16 | MF | José Velásquez | 4 June 1952 (aged 23) | | (Peru) Alianza Lima |
| 19 | MF | Raúl Párraga | 2 November 1944 (aged 30) | | (Peru) Sporting Cristal |
| 17 | MF | Pedro Ruiz | 6 July 1947 (aged 28) | | (Peru) Unión Huaral |
| 7 | MF | Alfredo Quesada | 22 September 1949 (aged 25) | | (Peru) Sporting Cristal |
| 20 | FW | Oswaldo Ramírez | 8 April 1952 (aged 23) | | (Peru) Universitario |
| 6 | MF | Percy Rojas | 16 September 1949 (aged 25) | | (Peru) Universitario |
| 11 | FW | Juan Carlos Oblitas | 16 February 1951 (aged 24) | | (Peru) Universitario |
| 22 | FW | Julio Aparicio | 30 January 1955 (aged 20) | | (Peru) Universitario |
| 15 | FW | Gerónimo Barbadillo | 29 September 1954 (aged 20) | | (Peru) Defensor Lima |
| 18 | FW | Enrique Casaretto | 20 September 1945 (aged 29) | | (Peru) Universitario |
| 9 | FW | Teófilo Cubillas | 8 March 1949 (aged 26) | | (Portugal) Porto |
| 10 | FW | Hugo Sotil | 18 May 1949 (aged 26) | | (Spain) Barcelona |

== Group C ==
=== Colombia ===
Head Coach: Efraín Sánchez

| No. | Pos. | Player | Date of birth (age) | Caps | Club |
|---|---|---|---|---|---|
| | GK | Jaime De Luque | 26 January 1945 (aged 30) | | (Colombia) Junior |
| 1 | GK | Pedro Zape | 3 June 1949 (aged 26) | | (Colombia) Deportivo Cali |
| | DF | Edgar Angulo | 2 March 1953 (aged 22) | | (Colombia) Atlético Nacional |
| 4 | DF | Miguel Escobar | 18 April 1945 (aged 30) | | (Colombia) Deportivo Cali |
| | DF | Euclides González | 4 March 1949 (aged 26) | | (Colombia) Millonarios |
| | DF | Alonso López | 27 May 1957 (aged 18) | | (Colombia) Millonarios |
| | DF | Henry Caicedo | 18 July 1951 (aged 23) | | (Colombia) Deportivo Cali |
| 2 | DF | Arturo Segovia | 26 October 1941 (aged 33) | | (Colombia) Millonarios |
| | DF | Luis Soto | 24 April 1945 (aged 30) | | (Colombia) Millonarios |
| 8 | MF | Oswaldo Calero | 24 April 1945 (aged 30) | | (Colombia) Deportivo Cali |
| 7 | MF | Willington Ortiz | 26 March 1952 (aged 23) | | (Colombia) Millonarios |
| 11 | MF | Ponciano Castro | 28 January 1953 (aged 22) | | (Colombia) Independiente Medellín |
| 10 | MF | Jairo Arboleda | 20 September 1947 (aged 27) | | (Colombia) Deportivo Cali |
| 5 | MF | Oscar Bolaño | 14 May 1951 (aged 24) | | (Colombia) Independiente Santa Fe |
| | MF | Jesús Rubio | 29 March 1945 (aged 30) | | (Colombia) Millonarios |
| 6 | MF | Diego Umaña | 12 March 1951 (aged 24) | | (Colombia) Deportivo Cali |
| 3 | MF | José Zárate | 12 November 1949 (aged 25) | | (Colombia) Junior |
| | MF | Carlos Rendón | 19 September 1951 (aged 23) | | (Colombia) Millonarios |
| | FW | Nelson Silva Pacheco | 8 October 1944 (aged 30) | | (Colombia) Junior |
| 17 | FW | Eduardo Retat | 16 June 1948 (aged 27) | | (Colombia) Atlético Nacional |
| 9 | FW | Víctor Campaz | 21 May 1949 (aged 26) | | (Colombia) Atlético Nacional |
| 16 | FW | Ernesto Díaz | 13 September 1952 (aged 22) | | (Colombia) Independiente Santa Fe |
| 18 | FW | Hugo Lóndero | 18 September 1946 (aged 28) | | (Colombia) Atlético Nacional |

=== Ecuador ===
Head Coach: (Uruguay) Roque Máspoli

| No. | Pos. | Player | Date of birth (age) | Caps | Club |
|---|---|---|---|---|---|
| | GK | Carlos Omar Delgado | 7 February 1950 (aged 25) | | (Ecuador) El Nacional |
| | GK | Eduardo Méndez | 13 January 1947 (aged 28) | | (Ecuador) El Nacional |
| | GK | Máximo Vera | | | (Ecuador) Barcelona |
| | DF | Washington Guevara | 30 April 1946 (aged 29) | | (Ecuador) LDU Quito |
| | DF | Fausto Klinger | 15 April 1953 (aged 22) | | (Ecuador) LDU Cuenca |
| | DF | Ramiro Tobar | 1 May 1944 (aged 31) | | (Ecuador) LDU Quito |
| | DF | Rafael Guerrero | 28 December 1951 (aged 23) | | (Ecuador) Emelec |
| | DF | Jefferson Camacho | 18 May 1949 (aged 26) | | (Ecuador) Emelec |
| | DF | Fausto Carrera | 12 March 1950 (aged 25) | | (Ecuador) Universidad Católica |
| | DF | Víctor Peláez | 12 February 1947 (aged 28) | | (Ecuador) Barcelona |
| | DF | Miguel Pérez | 8 March 1945 (aged 30) | | (Ecuador) El Nacional |
| | MF | Carlos Ron | 16 December 1953 (aged 21) | | (Ecuador) El Nacional |
| | MF | Wilmer Gómez | 15 May 1951 (aged 24) | | (Ecuador) Emelec |
| | MF | Jorge Tapia | 10 April 1949 (aged 26) | | (Ecuador) LDU Quito |
| | MF | Ricardo Armendáriz | 26 March 1954 (aged 21) | | (Ecuador) Emelec |
| | FW | Marcelo Cabezas | 5 April 1945 (aged 30) | | (Ecuador) El Nacional |
| | FW | Gonzalo Castañeda | 10 January 1948 (aged 27) | | (Ecuador) LDU Cuenca |
| | FW | Fabián Paz y Miño | 16 March 1953 (aged 22) | | (Ecuador) El Nacional |
| | FW | Gustavo Tapia | | | (Ecuador) LDU Quito |
| | FW | Polo Carrera | 11 January 1945 (aged 30) | | (Ecuador) LDU Quito |
| | FW | Félix Lasso | 28 May 1945 (aged 30) | | (Ecuador) El Nacional |

=== Paraguay ===
Head Coach: (Uruguay) José María Rodríguez

| No. | Pos. | Player | Date of birth (age) | Caps | Club |
|---|---|---|---|---|---|
| | GK | Ever Hugo Almeida | 1 July 1948 (aged 27) | | (Paraguay) Olimpia |
| | GK | José de La Cruz Benítez | 3 May 1952 (aged 23) | | (Paraguay) Olimpia |
| | DF | Julián Florentín | | | (Paraguay) River Plate |
| | DF | José Domingo Insfrán | 4 August 1949 (aged 25) | | (Paraguay) River Plate |
| | DF | Gustavo Benítez | 3 February 1953 (aged 22) | | (Paraguay) Olimpia |
| | DF | Juan Espínola | 12 June 1953 (aged 22) | | (Paraguay) Libertad |
| | DF | Francisco Riveros | 11 July 1946 (aged 29) | | (Paraguay) River Plate |
| | DF | Alicio Solalinde | 1 February 1952 (aged 23) | | (Paraguay) River Plate |
| | DF | Alcides Sosa | 24 March 1944 (aged 31) | | (Paraguay) Olimpia |
| | DF | Flaminio Sosa | 24 January 1946 (aged 29) | | (Paraguay) Olimpia |
| | MF | Fermín Escobar | | | (Paraguay) River Plate |
| | MF | Pedro Fleitas | 11 July 1953 (aged 22) | | (Paraguay) Libertad |
| | MF | Hugo Talavera | 31 October 1949 (aged 25) | | (Paraguay) Cerro Porteño |
| | MF | Luis Torres | 7 November 1952 (aged 22) | | (Paraguay) Olimpia |
| | MF | Francisco Rivera | 15 May 1952 (aged 23) | | (Paraguay) Sportivo Luqueño |
| | FW | Clemente Rolón | 23 November 1951 (aged 23) | | (Paraguay) River Plate |
| | FW | Hugo Kiesse | 18 October 1954 (aged 20) | | (Paraguay) Olimpia |
| | FW | Cristóbal Maldonado | 12 October 1950 (aged 24) | | (Paraguay) Libertad |
| | FW | Apolinar Paniagua | 23 July 1946 (aged 28) | | (Paraguay) Olimpia |
| | FW | Carlos José Báez | 1 November 1953 (aged 21) | | (Paraguay) Cerro Porteño |

== Semi-final ==
=== Uruguay ===
Head Coach: Juan Alberto Schiaffino

| No. | Pos. | Player | Date of birth (age) | Caps | Club |
|---|---|---|---|---|---|
| 1 | GK | Walter Corbo | 2 May 1949 (aged 26) | | (Uruguay) Peñarol |
| 12 | GK | Omar Correa | 6 January 1953 (aged 22) | | (Uruguay) River Plate |
| | DF | Juan Morales | 18 April 1956 (aged 19) | | (Uruguay) Cerro |
| 20 | DF | Nil Roque Chagas | | | (Uruguay) Danubio |
| | DF | Alfredo de los Santos | 12 February 1956 (aged 19) | | (Uruguay) Nacional |
| | DF | Nelson Acosta | 12 June 1944 (aged 31) | | (Uruguay) Peñarol |
| | DF | Walter Olivera | 16 August 1952 (aged 22) | | (Uruguay) Peñarol |
| | DF | Darío Pereyra | 20 October 1956 (aged 18) | | (Uruguay) Nacional |
| | DF | Carlos Peruena | 13 March 1955 (aged 20) | | (Uruguay) Peñarol |
| 5 | DF | Mario González | 27 May 1950 (aged 25) | | (Uruguay) Peñarol |
| | DF | Mario Zoryez | 9 September 1950 (aged 24) | | (Uruguay) Peñarol |
| 15 | MF | José Lorenzo | | | (Uruguay) Cerro |
| 13 | MF | Ricardo Mier | 18 January 1952 (aged 23) | | (Uruguay) Huracán Buceo |
| | MF | Juan Ramón Carrasco | 15 September 1956 (aged 18) | | (Uruguay) Nacional |
| | MF | Hebert Revetria | 27 August 1955 (aged 19) | | (Uruguay) Nacional |
| | MF | Saul Rivero | 23 July 1954 (aged 20) | | (Uruguay) Liverpool |
| | MF | Lorenzo Unanue | 22 March 1953 (aged 22) | | (Uruguay) Peñarol |
| | FW | Richard Forlán | 17 October 1950 (aged 24) | | (Uruguay) Montevideo Wanderers |
| 9 | FW | Fernando Morena | 2 February 1952 (aged 23) | | (Uruguay) Peñarol |
| | FW | Juan Carlos Ocampo | February 22, 1955 (aged 20) | | (Uruguay) Danubio |
| 23 | FW | Juan Silva | 30 August 1948 (aged 26) | | (Uruguay) Peñarol |
