= Malachias =

Malachias is a surname. Notable people with the surname include:

- Ioannis Malachias (1880–1958), Greek doctor, leader of the Ikarian Revolution and president of the Free State of Ikaria
- Modesto Malachias (born 1950), Brazilian former professional footballer

== See also ==
- Malachi
