= Luis Gonzalez =

Luis Gonzalez or González may refer to:

== Academics ==
- Luis González y González (1925–2003), Mexican historian
- Luis Eduardo González (1945–2016), Uruguayan political scientist
- Luis A. Gonzalez (judge) (fl. 1978–2015), American judge
- Luis González Vales (1930–2023), Puerto Rican historian

== Arts and Entertainment ==
- Luis "Checho" González (1933–2022), Chilean folklore composer and songwriter
- Luis Jorge González (1936–2016), Argentine composer and educator
- Luis González de Alba (1944–2016), Mexican writer
- Luis González Palma (born 1957), Guatemalan photographer
- Luis González Velázquez (1715–1763), Spanish Baroque painter

== Military ==
- Luis González de Guzmán (died 1443), Castilian nobleman
- Luis González de Ubieta (1899–1950), Spanish admiral

== Politicians ==
- Luis González Bravo (1811–1871), two-time prime minister of Spain
- Luis Arturo González López (1900–1965), president of Guatemala
- Luis González Olivares (1908–1976), Chilean politician
- Luis Gonzales Posada (born 1945), Peruvian politician
- Luis Eduardo González (1945–2016), Uruguayan political scientist, sociologist and polling specialist
- Luis González Macchi (born 1947), president of Paraguay, 1999–2003
- Luis González Seara (1936–2016), Spanish politician and sociologist

== Sportspeople ==
=== Association football ===
- Lucho González (born 1981), Argentine football midfielder
- Luis González (footballer, born 1958), Bolivian football midfielder
- Luis González (footballer, born 1972), Ecuadorian football midfielder
- Luis González (footballer, born 1997), Mexican football midfielder
- Luis González (footballer, born 1999), Venezuelan football goalkeeper

=== Baseball ===
- Luis González (2020s pitcher) (born 1992), Dominican baseball pitcher
- Luis González (1900s pitcher) (1884–?), Cuban baseball player
- Luis Gonzalez (outfielder, born 1967), American former Major League Baseball outfielder
- Luis González (outfielder, born 1995), Atlantic League of Professional Baseball outfielder
- Luis González (infielder) (born 1979), Venezuelan Major League Baseball utility player

=== Boxing ===
- Luis González (Chilean boxer) (born 1949), Chilean boxer
- Jorge Luis González (born 1964), Cuban heavyweight professional boxing contender, fl. 1990s
- Luis González (Venezuelan boxer) (born 1984), Venezuelan boxer

=== Other sports ===
- Luis González (swimmer) (1925–2019), Colombian swimmer
- Luis González (archer) (born 1945), Costa Rican archer
- Luis González (skier) (born 1955), Puerto Rican freestyle skier
- Luis Alberto González (born 1965), Colombian cyclist
- Luis Javier González (born 1969), Spanish middle-distance runner

== Other ==
- Luis Gonzalez (television character), a character in Chiquititas

== See also ==
- Luis Gonzales (1928–2012), Filipino actor
- Luis Gonzales Posada (born 1945), Peruvian politician and diplomat
