= Omar Ochoa =

Omar Ochoa can refer to:

- Omar Ochoa (cyclist)
- Omar Ochoa (footballer)
