= Luis Marquina =

Luis Marquina may refer to:

- Luis Marquina (director) (1904-1980), Spanish film director and screenwriter
- Luis Marquina (footballer) (born 1952), Venezuelan footballer
- Luis Miguel García-Marquina (born 1979), Spanish para-cyclist
