= Juan Carlos Fernández =

Juan Carlos Fernández can refer to:

- Juan Carlos Fernández (footballer) (born 1946)
- Juan Carlos Fernández (weightlifter) (born 1976)
