= Alcides (disambiguation) =

Alcides is a genus of moths.

Alcides may also refer to:

- Alcidodes, a genus of weevils, previously known as Alcides
- An alternative name for Heracles
- Alcides Araújo Alves, known simply as Alcides (born 1985), Brazilian footballer
- Alcides Báez (1947–2023), Paraguayan footballer
- Alcides Benítez (born 2002), Paraguayan footballer
- Alcides Bernal (1965–2026), Brazilian lawyer, radio broadcaster and politician
- Alcides Dambrós (1916–?), Brazilian shot putter
- Alcides Escobar (born 1986), Venezuelan baseball player
- Alcides Sosa (1944–2026), Paraguayan footballer

== See also ==
- Alcid
