= Francisco Rivera =

Francisco Rivera is the name of:

- Frank Rivera (athlete) (Francisco Rivera Paniagua; born 1928), Puerto Rican sprinter and middle-distance runner
- Paquirri (Francisco Rivera Pérez; 1948–1984), Spanish bullfighter
- Francisco Rivera (Paraguayan footballer) (born 1951), Paraguayan football midfielder
- Francisco Rivera Ordóñez (born 1974), Spanish bullfighter, son of Paquirri
- Francisco Rivera (fighter) (born 1981), American mixed martial artist
- Francisco Rivera (Mexican footballer) (born 1994), Mexican football attacking midfielder
- Francisco X. Rivera, bilingual sportscaster
