= Jorge Chica =

Ecuadorian neurosurgeon and footballer (1952–2020)

Jorge Chica Ramírez (1952 – 30 March 2020) was an Ecuadorian footballer and neurosurgeon. He graduated as a doctor when he played for Barcelona Sporting Club, which is why he was nicknamed "The Doctor" on the pitch. He was champion with Barcelona in 1980.

== Biography ==
Chica played as left winger in several Ecuadorian football clubs. He became better known when he joined Barcelona Sporting Club in 1974, playing for seven seasons until 1980; at the same time he graduated as a doctor, for which he was nicknamed "The Doctor" Chica on the field. He had his greatest performance in the team, in 1977 and 1978, where he established himself as a starter along with Miguel Coronel, Washington Pepe Paes, Víctor Ephanor, Juan Madruñero, Nelsinho and others.

The two occasions in which Chica scored a goal in a Clásico del Astillero, Barcelona did not lose, against a Emelec led by Eduardo Ñato García. The first occasion was in a 1–1 draw in 1977 and the second was on September 17, 1978, when the Argentine footballer Aníbal Cibeyra of Emelec, scored an Olympic goal for the second consecutive classic and the only one of his team in that match, while Ángel Luis Liciedi and Chica rallied the score by ending the match 2–1. He closed his cycle in the Barcelona when he was champion in 1980.

As a doctor, he specialized in neurosurgery and worked in various hospitals in New Jersey, USA, before returning to Ecuador.

== Death ==
A few days before his death, Chica treated former Emelec footballer Ecuador Figueroa, terminally ill with cancer. Chica died at age 68 on 30 March 2020, of COVID-19 complications caused by SARS-CoV-2, during the pandemic in Ecuador.
