= Juan Clemente Zenea =

Cuban writer

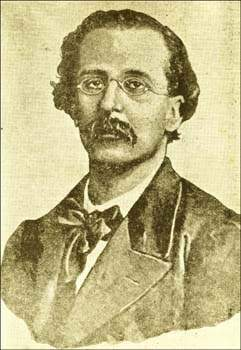
- Born: February 24, 1832; Bayamo, Captaincy General of Cuba, Spanish Empire
- Died: 1871 (age 38); Cuba
- Occupation: Poet
- Years active: 1846–1871
- Style: Romanticism

Juan Clemente Zenea was a Cuban writer born in Bayamo, Granma, on February 24, 1832. He is recognised as having been a great influence on Cuban literature for reintroducing Romanticism, marking a new age in Hispano-American poetry.

In 1845 he enrolled in José de la Luz y Caballero's college, where his inclinations towards literature first appeared. In 1846 he published his first poems in "La Prensa", a newspaper based in Havana for which he became a writer in 1849.

From this point on the number of his works grew considerably. For example, he published “La mujer ¿Es un ángel? ¡No es un ángel! ¿Si será o no será?” in collaboration with José Fornaris and Rafael Otero. He wrote "Almendares" together with Idelfonso Estrada Zenea and collaborated on "La voz del pueblo".

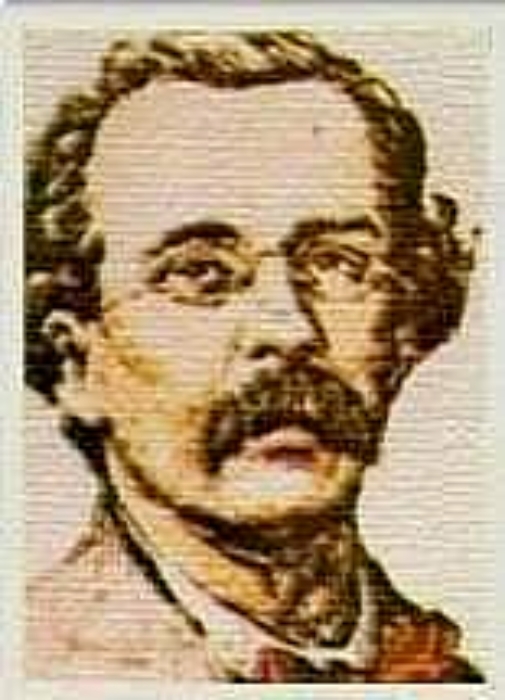
Portrait of Clemente Zenea by unknown Honduran artist.

In 1852 he had to emigrate to New Orleans, US. While there he collaborated on "El correo de Louisiana", "El Independiente" and "Faro de Cuba", carrying out a strong campaign against the Spanish government. Later he moved to New York, where he worked for "El Filibustero", "La Verdad" and "El Cubano". He was condemned to death in Havana in 1853 because of his activities against the Spanish government, but was pardoned due to the general amnesty and was able to return to Cuba the following year. From then on he worked in José de la Luz y Caballero's college as an English teacher. In general he has produced a wide range of works and has received various awards. Some of his poems are included in "El laúd del desterrado" and an uncountable number of his articles appeared in contemporary Cuban and Spanish publications, such as "La Chamarreta", "El Siglo", "Revista del pueblo de Cuba", "Ofrenda al Bazar", "Álbum cubano de lo bueno y lo bello", "La Piragua", "Brisas de Cuba", "Floresta Cubana" and "Guirnalda Cubana", as well as the Spanish magazines "La América" and "La Ilustración Republicana Federal". He founded and directed the "Revista Habanera".

In 1865 he returned to New York to collaborate on the "Revista del Nuevo Mundo". He then moved to Mexico to work on the publication "Diario Oficial". At the beginning of the 1868 war in Cuba he returned to the United States to support the cause, but every expedition in which he took part ended in failure. He managed to reach Cuba secretly in 1870, and after a meeting with Carlos Manuel de Céspedes, leader of the rebellion, he was imprisoned by Spanish troops while trying to return to the United States and shot to death in 1871.

== Published works ==
- 1855 Poesías
- 1859 Lejos de la patria. Memorias de un joven poeta
- 1860 Cantos de la tarde
- 1861 Sobre la literatura de Estados Unidos

== Poems ==
- En un álbum
- Fidelia
- A una golondrina
- Diario de un mártir
- Ausencia
- En Greenwood
- Nocturno
- Las sombras
- Retorno
- Oriente y Ocaso
- Diario de un mártir
