= Daniel Giménez (footballer, born 1977) =

Argentine footballer

Personal information
- Full name: Daniel Gonzalo Giménez
- Date of birth: 19 January 1977 (age 49)
- Place of birth: Moreno, Argentina
- Height: 1.88 m (6 ft 2 in)
- Position: Forward

Senior career*
Years	Team	Apps	(Gls)
1995–1996	Flandria	0	(0)
1996–1998	Defensores de Belgrano	108	(36)
1998–2001	San Miguel	82	(26)
2001–2002	Independiente Rivadavia	31	(13)
2002–2006	Godoy Cruz	102	(37)
2003	→ Rafaela (loan)	6	(1)
2003	→ Wilstermann (loan)	17	(8)
2006–2007	Instituto	35	(15)
2007	Cobreloa	18	(6)
2008–2009	Chacarita Juniors	16	(0)
2009–2010	Los Andes	31	(11)
2010–2011	Defensores de Belgrano	2	(0)
2012	Racing de Córdoba	7	(0)
2012–2013	JJ Urquiza	11	(1)
2013	Deportivo Maipú	16	(2)
2012–2013	Argentino de Mendoza	12	(6)
2014	Unión de Villa Krause	12	(3)
2015	Deportivo Guaymallén	10	(1)
Total		516	(166)
- * Club domestic league appearances and goals

Daniel Gonzalo Giménez (born 19 February 1977), nicknamed El Tanque ("The Tank"), is an Argentine former professional footballer and football manager who played as a forward.

A journeyman striker, he spent most of his playing career in the Argentine lower divisions, while also playing top-flight football in Argentina and Chile and having spells abroad with Jorge Wilstermann in Bolivia and Cobreloa in Chile.

Giménez is particularly associated with Godoy Cruz, for whom he played a decisive role in the club's first promotion to the Argentine Primera División in 2006. He scored twice in extra time in the second leg of the promotion final against Nueva Chicago, securing a 3–1 victory and a 4–2 aggregate win.

== Club career ==
=== Early career ===
Giménez began his senior career in the Argentine lower divisions during the mid-1990s. He played for Flandria, Defensores de Belgrano, San Miguel and Independiente Rivadavia, establishing himself as a goalscoring centre-forward.

His performances in the second tier eventually led to an opportunity in the Argentine Primera División with Atlético de Rafaela in 2003. Giménez scored Rafaela's first goal following the club's promotion to the top flight, in a match against Quilmes.

During 2003 he also played abroad for Bolivian club Jorge Wilstermann, before returning to Argentina.

=== Godoy Cruz ===
Giménez had his most significant spell with Godoy Cruz. He initially joined the Mendoza club in 2002 and later returned after his spells with Atlético de Rafaela and Jorge Wilstermann.

He was part of the Godoy Cruz side that won the Primera B Nacional Apertura tournament in 2005. Giménez, Mauro Poy and Mariano Torresi finished as the club's joint leading scorers in the Apertura, with five goals each.

Godoy Cruz subsequently faced Nueva Chicago in May 2006 for promotion to the Argentine Primera División. The first leg in Buenos Aires finished 1–1. In the return match at the Estadio Malvinas Argentinas in Mendoza, the score was again level after 90 minutes, sending the tie into extra time. Giménez then scored twice as Godoy Cruz won 3–1 and secured promotion with a 4–2 aggregate victory.

The result represented Godoy Cruz's first promotion to Argentina's top division, and contemporary coverage described Giménez as one of the central figures of the achievement.

=== Instituto and Cobreloa ===
After leaving Godoy Cruz, Giménez joined Instituto de Córdoba, continuing to play in Argentina's second tier.

In July 2007, Chilean club Cobreloa reached an agreement to sign Giménez, who at the time was still contracted to Godoy Cruz after having played on loan at Instituto.

Playing in the Chilean Primera División, Giménez scored six league goals for the Calama club. Among his goals was the opening goal in Cobreloa's 5–1 victory over Deportes Melipilla in September 2007, and he later scored in a 3–1 win against Universidad Católica.

=== Return to Argentina and later career ===
Giménez returned to Argentina after his spell with Cobreloa, joining San Martín de San Juan in 2008. He subsequently played for Chacarita Juniors, Los Andes and, in a second spell, Defensores de Belgrano.

With Chacarita, he was part of the squad that achieved promotion to the Argentine Primera División in 2009.

During the final years of his playing career, Giménez represented clubs including Racing de Córdoba, JJ Urquiza, Deportivo Maipú, Argentino de Mendoza, Unión de Villa Krause and Deportivo Guaymallén. He was also part of the Unión de Villa Krause side that earned promotion in 2014.

== Managerial career ==
Giménez began preparing for a coaching career while still playing, undertaking his coaching qualifications in 2011. After retiring, he moved into management and worked with several clubs in Mendoza.

He managed Huracán Las Heras in 2016 and led the club to promotion to the Torneo Federal A. He subsequently coached Rodeo del Medio between 2017 and 2018, worked in the youth system of Independiente Rivadavia in 2019 and managed Luján Sport Club in 2020.

== Honors ==
Godoy Cruz

- Primera B Nacional Apertura: 2005
- Promotion to Argentine Primera División: 2006

Chacarita Juniors

- Promotion to Argentine Primera División: 2009

Unión de Villa Krause

- Promotion: 2014

=== Manager ===
Huracán Las Heras

- Promotion to Torneo Federal A: 2016
