= Carlos Delgado (disambiguation) =

Carlos Delgado (born 1972) is a retired Puerto Rican Major League Baseball player.

Carlos Delgado may also refer to:

- Carlos Delgado Chalbaud (1909–1950), Venezuelan military officer and President (1948–1950)
- Carlos Delgado (footballer, born 1950), Ecuadorian football goalkeeper
- Carlos Delgado Altieri (born 1960), Puerto Rican politician and mayor of Isabela
- Carlos Delgado (taekwondo) (born 1970), Nicaraguan taekwondo practitioner
- Carlos Delgado (footballer, born 1990), Spanish football centre-back
