= Álvaro Muñoz =

Álvaro Muñoz may refer to:

- Álvaro Muñoz (footballer) (born 1954), Colombian footballer
- Álvaro Muñoz (basketball) (born 1990), Spanish basketball player
