= Juan Villalba =

Juan Villalba can refer to:

- Juan Bautista Villalba (1924–2003), Paraguayan footballer
- Juan Manuel Villalba (born 1954), Paraguayan footballer
- Juan Manuel Villalba (born 2006), Argentinian footballer
