= Freddy Vargas =

Freddy Vargas can refer to:

- Freddy Vargas (cyclist)
- Freddy Vargas (Bolivian footballer)
- Freddy Vargas (Venezuelan footballer)
