= Edgar Vaca =

Bolivian footballer (born 1956)

Personal information
- Date of birth: 2 May 1956 (age 70)

International career
Years	Team	Apps	(Gls)
1979–1985	Bolivia	30	(0)

Edgar Vaca (born 2 May 1956) is a Bolivian footballer. He played in 30 matches for the Bolivia national football team from 1979 to 1985. He was also part of Bolivia's squad for the 1979 Copa América tournament.
