= Victorio Ocaño =

Argentine footballer

Personal information
- Date of birth: 9 June 1954 (age 72)

International career
Years	Team	Apps	(Gls)
1975–1980	Argentina	5	(0)

Victorio Ocaño (born 9 June 1954) is an Argentine former footballer. He played in five matches for the Argentina national football team from 1975 to 1980. He was also part of Argentina's squad for the 1979 Copa América tournament.
