= José Luis Gaitán =

Argentine footballer

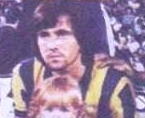

Personal information
- Date of birth: 7 September 1957 (age 69)

International career
Years	Team	Apps	(Gls)
1979	Argentina	3	(0)

José Luis Gaitán (born 7th September 1957) is an Argentine footballer. He played in three matches for the Argentina national football team in 1979. He was also part of Argentina's squad for the 1979 Copa América tournament.
