= Arsenio Meza =

Paraguayan footballer (born 1953)

Personal information
- Date of birth: 23 January 1953 (age 73)

International career
Years	Team	Apps	(Gls)
1979	Paraguay	4	(1)

Arsenio Meza (born 22 January 1953) is a Paraguayan footballer. He played in four matches for the Paraguay national football team in 1979. He was also part of Paraguay's squad for the 1979 Copa América tournament.
