= Rogelio Delfín =

Bolivian footballer (born 1953)

Personal information
- Date of birth: 4 September 1953 (age 73)

International career
Years	Team	Apps	(Gls)
1979	Bolivia	1	(0)

Rogelio Delfín (born 4 September 1953) is a Bolivian footballer. He played in one match for the Bolivia national football team in 1979. He was also part of Bolivia's squad for the 1979 Copa América tournament.
