= Juan Madruñero =

Ecuadorian footballer (born 1954)

Personal information
- Date of birth: 26 April 1954 (age 72)

International career
Years	Team	Apps	(Gls)
1979–1981	Ecuador	3	(0)

Juan Madruñero (born 26 April 1954) is an Ecuadorian footballer. He played in three matches for the Ecuador national football team from 1979 to 1981. He was also part of Ecuador's squad for the 1979 Copa América tournament.
