= Hebert Hoyos =

Bolivian footballer (born 1956)

Personal information
- Full name: Hebert Hoyos Ayala
- Date of birth: 29 April 1956 (age 70)
- Position: Goalkeeper

International career
Years	Team	Apps	(Gls)
1979–1985	Bolivia	15	(0)

Hebert Hoyos Ayala (born 29 April 1956) is a Bolivian former footballer who played as a goalkeeper. He played in 15 matches for the Bolivia national football team from 1979 to 1985. He was also part of Bolivia's squad for the 1979 Copa América tournament.
