= Waldo Quiroz =

Chilean footballer (born 1949)

Personal information
- Date of birth: 10 September 1949 (age 77)

International career
| Years | Team | Apps | (Gls) |
| 1977–1979 | Chile | 5 | (1) |

Waldo Quiroz (born 10 September 1949) is a Chilean footballer. He played in five matches for the Chile national football team from 1977 to 1979. He was also part of Chile's squad for the 1979 Copa América tournament.
