= Heberth Ríos =

Colombian footballer (born 1956)

Herberth Armando Ríos (born 28 September 1956) is a retired Colombian football goalkeeper. He played for Once Caldas and Independiente Santa Fe in the 1980s.

== International career ==
Ríos appeared for the senior Colombia national football team, including the 1979 Copa América.

He also played for Colombia at the 1980 Olympic Games in Moscow.
