= Víctor Lugo =

Colombian footballer (born 1954)

Personal information
- Date of birth: 15 April 1954 (age 72)
- Position: Forward

International career
Years	Team	Apps	(Gls)
1985	Colombia	2	(1)

Víctor Lugo (born 15 April 1954) is a Colombian footballer. He played in two matches for the Colombia national football team in 1985. He was also part of Colombia's squad for the 1979 Copa América tournament.
