= José Paes =

Ecuadorian footballer (1946–2025)

Personal information
- Full name: Francisco José Paes
- Date of birth: 26 March 1946
- Place of birth: São Paulo, Brazil
- Date of death: 1 August 2025 (aged 79)
- Place of death: Conchas, São Paulo, Brazil
- Position: Defender

Youth career
- 1960s: Portuguesa

Senior career*
Years	Team	Apps	(Gls)
1966–1971	Portuguesa	170	(12)
1971–1982	Barcelona SC		
1983	9 de Octubre		

International career
1979–1981	Ecuador	12	(0)
- * Club domestic league appearances and goals

Francisco José Paes (Spanish: [xoˈse ˈpaes]; 26 March 1946 – 1 August 2025) was a professional footballer who played as a defender. Born in Brazil, he played for the Ecuador national team.

== Career ==
Paes began his career in the youth team of Portuguesa de Desportos in the 1960s, and played professionally for the club from 1966 to 1971, when he transferred to Ecuadorian football. He was called up to the São Paulo state team and Brazil national team, but without entering to the field.

With Barcelona SC, he won three national titles, in 1971, 1980, and 1981. He made 12 appearances for the Ecuador national team from 1979 to 1981. He was also part of Ecuador's squad for the 1979 Copa América tournament. Paes died on 1 August 2025, at the age of 79.
