= Jorge Peredo =

Chilean footballer (born 1953)

Personal information
- Full name: Jorge Sigfrido Peredo Gutiérrez
- Date of birth: 17 February 1953 (age 73)
- Place of birth: Santiago, Chile
- Position: Forward

Senior career*
Years	Team	Apps	(Gls)
1974	Castro (city team)		
1974	Ñublense		
1975–1976	Aviación		
1977–1979	Unión Española		
1980–1981	Palestino		
1982–1983	Deportes Puerto Montt		
1984	Petrolero		

International career
1979	Chile	5	(4)
- * Club domestic league appearances and goals

Jorge Sigfrido Peredo Gutiérrez (born 17 February 1953) is a Chilean former footballer who played as a forward.

== Career ==
He began his career playing for the team of Castro city, becoming national amateur champion in 1974. Next, he played in Chile for five teams, including Unión Española with whom he won the 1977 Primera División de Chile.

Abroad, he played for Bolivian club Petrolero de Cochabamba in 1984, his last club.

He made five appearances for the Chile national team in 1979. He was also part of Chile's squad for the 1979 Copa América tournament, becoming the top goalscorer along with the Paraguayan Eugenio Morel.

== Personal life ==
Peredo made his home in Canada.

== Honours ==
=== Club ===
Castro (city team)

- Campeonato Nacional Amateur: 1974

Unión Española

- Chilean Primera División: 1977 Primera División de Chile

=== Individual ===
- Copa América Top Goalscorer: 1979
