= Julio César Hernández =

Venezuelan footballer (born 1951)

Personal information
- Date of birth: 6 October 1951 (age 75)
- Position: Forward

International career
Years	Team	Apps	(Gls)
1979–1981	Venezuela	3	(0)

Julio César Hernández (born 6 October 1951) is a Venezuelan footballer. He played in three matches for the Venezuela national football team from 1979 to 1981. He was also part of Venezuela's squad for the 1979 Copa América tournament.
