= Erwin Espinosa =

Bolivian footballer (born 1954)

Personal information
- Date of birth: 27 July 1954 (age 72)
- Position: Defender

International career
Years	Team	Apps	(Gls)
1979–1985	Bolivia	7	(0)

Erwin Espinosa (born 27 July 1954) is a Bolivian former footballer. He played in seven matches for the Bolivia national football team from 1979 to 1985. He was also part of Bolivia's squad for the 1979 Copa América tournament.
