= Mariano Pesoa =

Paraguayan footballer (born 1952)

Mariano Catalino Pesoa
Personal information
- Full name: Mariano Catalino Pesoa
- Date of birth: 30 April 1952 (age 74)
- Place of birth: Asunción, Paraguay
- Height: 1.75 m (5 ft 9 in)
- Position: Central midfielder

Senior career*
Years	Team	Apps	(Gls)
1969–1975	Sol de América		
1975–1982	Cerro Porteño		
1983–1987	Deportivo Recoleta		

International career
1975–1979	Paraguay	8	(1)
- * Club domestic league appearances and goals

Mariano Catalino Pesoa (born 30 April 1952) is a former Paraguayan footballer (central midfielder). Pesoa was a member of Paraguay national team and he won 1979 Copa América with the team.

== Honours ==
- Cerro Porteño
  - Paraguayan Primera División: 1977
- Paraguay
  - Copa América: 1979
