= Domingo Cáceres =

Uruguayan footballer (born 1959)

Personal information
- Full name: Domingo Rufino Cáceres Olivera
- Date of birth: 7 September 1959 (age 67)
- Place of birth: Salto, Uruguay
- Position: Centre-back

Senior career*
Years	Team	Apps	(Gls)
- Peñarol

International career
1979–1980	Uruguay	7	(0)
- * Club domestic league appearances and goals

Domingo Rufino Cáceres Olivera (born 7 September 1959) is a Uruguayan former professional footballer who played as a centre-back. He made seven appearances for the Uruguay national team from 1979 to 1980. He was also part of Uruguay's squad for the 1979 Copa América tournament.
