= Rafael Cadenas (footballer) =

Venezuelan footballer (born 1958)

Personal information
- Date of birth: 8 September 1958 (age 68)
- Position: Midfielder

International career
Years	Team	Apps	(Gls)
1979	Venezuela	1	(0)

Rafael Cadenas (born 8 September 1958) is a Venezuelan footballer. He played in one match for the Venezuela national football team in 1979. He was also part of Venezuela's squad for the 1979 Copa América tournament.
