= Aldo Fierro =

Bolivian footballer (born 1958)

Personal information
- Date of birth: 19 June 1958 (age 68)

International career
Years	Team	Apps	(Gls)
1979–1981	Bolivia	9	(0)

Aldo Fierro (born 19 June 1958) is a Bolivian footballer. He played in nine matches for the Bolivia national football team from 1979 to 1981. He was also part of Bolivia's squad for the 1979 Copa América tournament.
