= Freddy Clavijo =

Uruguayan footballer (born 1955)

Personal information
- Full name: Freddy Gustavo Clavijo Gómez
- Date of birth: 3 May 1955 (age 71)

International career
| Years | Team | Apps | (Gls) |
| 1977 | Uruguay | 2 | (0) |

Freddy Gustavo Clavijo Gómez (born 3 May 1955) is a Uruguayan former footballer. He played in two matches for the Uruguay national football team in 1977. He was also part of Uruguay's squad for the 1979 Copa América tournament.
