= Isabelino Acosta =

Paraguayan footballer (born 1956)

Personal information
- Date of birth: 2 December 1956 (age 69)

International career
Years	Team	Apps	(Gls)
1979	Paraguay	5	(1)

Isabelino Acosta (born 2 December 1956) is a Paraguayan footballer. He played in five matches for the Paraguay national football team in 1979. He was also part of Paraguay's squad for the 1979 Copa América tournament.
