= Tito Vera =

Paraguayan footballer (born 1952)

Personal information
- Full name: Tito Prisciliano Vera
- Date of birth: 1 April 1952 (age 74)
- Position: Midfielder

International career
Years	Team	Apps	(Gls)
1976–1979	Paraguay	10	(0)

Tito Vera (born 1 April 1952) is a Paraguayan footballer. He played in ten matches for the Paraguay national football team from 1976 to 1979. He was also part of Paraguay's squad for the 1979 Copa América tournament.
