= Milton Rodríguez (Ecuadorian footballer) =

Ecuadorian footballer (born 1954)

Personal information
- Date of birth: 9 July 1954 (age 72)
- Position: Goalkeeper

International career
Years	Team	Apps	(Gls)
1979–1983	Ecuador	5	(0)

Milton Rodríguez (born 9 July 1954) is an Ecuadorian former footballer who played as a goalkeeper. He made five appearances for the Ecuador national team from 1979 to 1983. He was also part of Ecuador's squad for the 1979 Copa América tournament.
