= Arecio Colmán =

Paraguayan footballer (born 1951)

Personal information
- Date of birth: 10 June 1951 (age 75)

International career
Years	Team	Apps	(Gls)
1971–1979	Paraguay	13	(1)

Arecio Colmán (born 10 June 1951) is a Paraguayan footballer. He played in 13 matches for the Paraguay national football team from 1971 to 1979. He was also part of Paraguay's squad for the 1979 Copa América tournament.
