= Alejandrino Arce =

Paraguayan footballer (born 1955)

Personal information
- Date of birth: 11 August 1955 (age 71)
- Place of birth: Areguá, Paraguay

International career
Years	Team	Apps	(Gls)
1979	Paraguay	3	(0)

Alejandrino Arce (born 11 August 1955) is a Paraguayan footballer. He played in three matches for the Paraguay national football team in 1979. He was also part of Paraguay's squad for the 1979 Copa América tournament.
