= Zezé (footballer, born 1957) =

Brazilian footballer (1957–2008)

Personal information
- Full name: Antônio José da Silva Gouveia
- Date of birth: 30 June 1957
- Place of birth: Muriaé, Brazil
- Date of death: 30 December 2008 (aged 51)
- Position: Forward

International career
Years	Team	Apps	(Gls)
1979	Brazil	2	(0)

Antônio José da Silva Gouveia (30 June 1957 – 30 December 2008), better known as just Zezé, was a Brazilian footballer who played as a forward. He made two appearances for the Brazil national team in 1979. He was also part of Brazil's squad for the 1979 Copa América tournament.
