= Juan Bujedo =

Argentine footballer

Personal information
- Full name: Juan Carlos Bujedo
- Date of birth: 8 March 1956 (age 70)

International career
Years	Team	Apps	(Gls)
1979–1983	Argentina	3	(0)

Juan Carlos Bujedo (born 8 March 1956) is an Argentinean footballer. He played in three matches for the Argentina national football team from 1979 to 1983. He was also part of Argentina's squad for the 1979 Copa América tournament.
