= Careca (footballer, born 1943) =

Brazilian footballer (1943–2026)

Personal information
- Full name: Jesus Carlos da Silva
- Date of birth: 26 September 1943
- Place of birth: Baldim, Minas Gerais, Brazil
- Date of death: 29 June 2026 (aged 82)
- Place of death: Sete Lagoas, Minas Gerais, Brazil
- Position: Goalkeeper

Youth career
- Textil (Sete Lagoas)

Senior career*
Years	Team	Apps	(Gls)
1964–1967	Democrata-SL		
1968–1976	Atlético Mineiro	166	(0)
1973	→ Comercial-MS (loan)		
1976	São José-SP		
1977	Democrata-SL		
1977	Valerio		
- * Club domestic league appearances and goals

Jesus Carlos da Silva (26 September 1943 – 29 June 2026), better known as Careca, was a Brazilian professional footballer who played as a goalkeeper. He was part of Brazil’s squad for the 1975 Copa América.

== Career ==
Revealed in the Democrata-SL, at Atlético Mineiro he became the goalkeeper with the lowest average number of goals conceded, with 90 goals in 166 matches.

Careca was part of the Brazil national team squad that competed in the 1975 Copa América, when players from Minas Gerais mostly formed the team.

== Death ==
Careca died of lung cancer on 29 June 2026, at the age of 82.

== Honours ==
Atlético Mineiro

- Campeonato Mineiro: 1970
- Campeonato Brasileiro: 1971
- Taça Belo Horizonte: 1972
- Taça Minas Gerais: 1975, 1976
