= Ramiro Vargas =

Bolivian footballer (born 1958)

Personal information
- Full name: Ramiro Vargas Espinoza
- Date of birth: 22 October 1958 (age 68)
- Place of birth: La Paz, Bolivia
- Position: Defender

International career
Years	Team	Apps	(Gls)
1979–1989	Bolivia	21	(0)

Ramiro Vargas Espinoza (born 22 October 1958) is a Bolivian former footballer who played as a defender. He played in 21 matches for the Bolivia national football team from 1979 to 1989. He was also part of Bolivia's squad for the 1979 Copa América and the 1983 Copa América tournaments.
