= Pablo Baldivieso =

Bolivian footballer (born 1949)

Personal information
- Date of birth: 30 June 1949 (age 77)

International career
Years	Team	Apps	(Gls)
1977–1979	Bolivia	2	(0)

Pablo Baldivieso (born 30 June 1949) is a Bolivian footballer. He played in two matches for the Bolivia national football team from 1977 to 1979. He was also part of Bolivia's squad for the 1979 Copa América tournament.
