= Marcelo Cabezas =

Ecuadorian footballer (born 1945)

Personal information
- Date of birth: 5 April 1945 (age 81)
- Position: Midfielder

International career
Years	Team	Apps	(Gls)
1975	Ecuador	3	(0)

Marcelo Cabezas (born 5 April 1945) is an Ecuadorian former footballer. He played in three matches for the Ecuador national football team in 1975. He was also part of Ecuador's squad for the 1975 Copa América tournament.
