= Rubén Torres (footballer) =

Venezuelan footballer (born 1949)

Personal information
- Full name: Rubén Darío Torres
- Date of birth: 26 October 1949 (age 77)

International career
| Years | Team | Apps | (Gls) |
| 1975 | Venezuela | 3 | (0) |

Rubén Darío Torres (born 26 October 1949) is a Venezuelan footballer. He played in three matches for the Venezuela national football team in 1975. He was also part of Venezuela's squad for the 1975 Copa América tournament.
