= Jefferson Camacho =

Ecuadorian footballer (born 1949)

Personal information
- Full name: Jéfferson Donald Camacho Macias
- Date of birth: 18 May 1949 (age 77)
- Position: Defender

International career
Years	Team	Apps	(Gls)
1973–1975	Ecuador	5	(0)

Jéfferson Donald Camacho Macias (born 18 May 1949) is an Ecuadorian former footballer. He played in five matches for the Ecuador national football team from 1973 to 1975. He was also part of Ecuador's squad for the 1975 Copa América tournament.
