= Carlos Torres (Ecuadorian footballer) =

Ecuadorian footballer (born 1951)

Personal information
- Full name: Carlos Torres Garcés
- Date of birth: 15 August 1951 (age 75)
- Place of birth: Esmeraldas, Ecuador
- Position: Midfielder

International career
Years	Team	Apps	(Gls)
1976–1985	Ecuador	16	(2)

Carlos Torres Garcés (born 15 August 1951) is an Ecuadorian footballer. He played in 16 matches for the Ecuador national football team from 1976 to 1985. He was also part of Ecuador's squad for the 1979 Copa América tournament.
