= Raúl Párraga =

Peruvian footballer (born 1944)

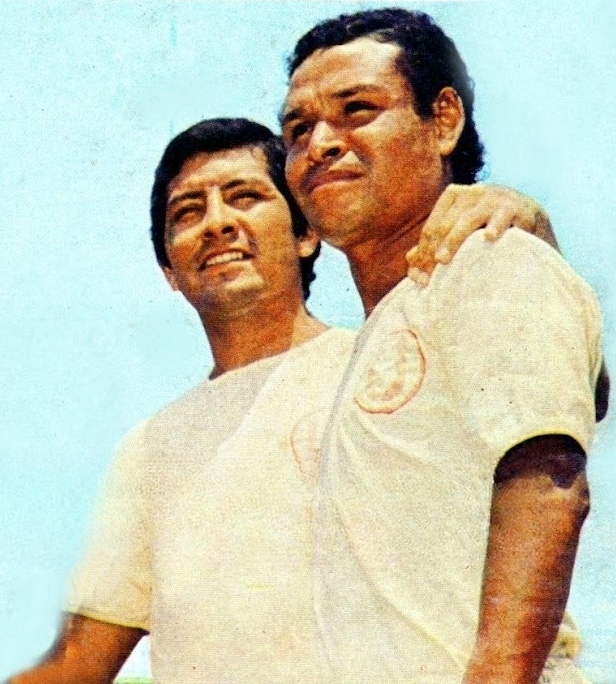
- Párraga and Pichicho Benavides in 1976

Personal information
- Full name: Raúl Alberto Párraga
- Date of birth: 16 September 1947 (age 79)
- Position: Midfielder

International career
Years	Team	Apps	(Gls)
1975	Peru	4	(0)

Raúl Párraga (born 16 setiembre 1947) is a Peruvian footballer. He played in four matches for the Peru national football team in 1975. He was also part of Peru's squad for the 1975 Copa América tournament.
