= Modesto Malachias =

Brazilian footballer

Modesto
Personal information
- Full name: Modesto Malachias
- Date of birth: 20 March 1950 (age 76)
- Place of birth: Campinas, Brazil
- Height: 1.90 m (6 ft 3 in)
- Position: Centre-back

Senior career*
Years	Team	Apps	(Gls)
1971	Palmeiras (SJBV)		
1972–1973	Barretos		
1974–1975	Uberaba		
1976–1978	Atlético Mineiro	106	(5)
1979	Vila Nova		
1980	Atlético Goianiense		
- * Club domestic league appearances and goals as of 28 November 2023

Modesto Malachias (born 20 March 1950), simply known as Modesto, is a Brazilian former professional footballer who played as a centre-back. He was in Brazil’s squad for the 1975 Copa América.

== Career ==
A tall defender with a very physical game, Modesto gained prominence due to his performance at Uberaba SC, twice being considered the best defender in football in Minas Gerais. He transferred to Atlético Mineiro where he made 106 appearances.

== Internacional career ==
Modesto was part of the Brazil national team squad that competed in the 1975 Copa América, when players from Minas Gerais mostly formed the team.

== Honours ==
Atlético Mineiro

- Campeonato Mineiro: 1976, 1978
- Copa dos Campeões da Copa Brasil: 1978
- Taça Minas Gerais: 1976
