= Mario Rojas =

Bolivian footballer (1941–2018)

Personal information
- Full name: Mario Rojas Arías
- Date of birth: 8 September 1941
- Place of birth: Salta, Argentina
- Date of death: 12 September 2018 (aged 77)
- Place of death: San Salvador de Jujuy, Argentina
- Position: Defender

Senior career*
Years	Team	Apps	(Gls)
- Gorriti
- Talleres de Perico
- Gimnasia de Jujuy
- Atlético Tucumán
- Bolívar
- Municipal La Paz
- CD San José

International career
1969-1975	Bolivia	7	(0)
- * Club domestic league appearances and goals

Mario Rojas (8 September 1941 – 12 September 2018) was an Argentine-born Bolivian footballer. He scored Bolívar's first goal of its history in Copa Libertadores on 12 March 1957. He was part of Bolivia's squad for the 1975 Copa América tournament. Rojas died on 12 September 2018, at the age of 77.
