= Vantuir =

Brazilian footballer

Personal information
- Full name: Vantuir Galdino Ramos
- Date of birth: November 16, 1949 (age 76)
- Place of birth: Belo Horizonte
- Height: 1.81 m (5 ft 11 1/2 in)
- Position: Defender

Senior career*
Years	Team	Apps	(Gls)
1969–1974	Atlético Mineiro		
1974	Flamengo		
1975–1978	Atlético Mineiro		
1978–1982	Grêmio		
1983	América-SP		
1984	Rio Branco-ES		

International career
1972–1975	Brazil		

Managerial career
- 1993–1994: Atlético Mineiro
- 1998: Atlético Mineiro
- 2001–2002: Al-Wehda
- * Club domestic league appearances and goals

Galdino Vantuir Ramos (born Belo Horizonte, 16 November 1949), known as Vantuir, is a former Brazilian footballer who played in defence for Clube Atletico Mineiro and for the Brazil national football team. Vantuir played with Clube Atletico Mineiro from 1969 to 1978, with a brief stint at Flamengo in 1974. In 1978, he moved to the Guild in Porto Alegre and at the end of his career, went through America Sao Jose do Rio Preto and Rio Branco in Espírito Santo. He played for the Brazil national football team in nine games, and obtained eight wins and a draw, plus the title of the Brazil Independence Cup in 1972. He is currently a football coach in Belo Horizonte.

His first club as coach was with Clube Atlético Juventus of Divinópolis in 1984. He also worked in America Mineiro, Atlético, Al-Hilal of Saudi Arabia, Mogi Mirim, Volta Redonda, Esporte Clube Democrata and Agremiação Esportiva Canedense. In 2007, he directed the América Mineiro during the State Championship.

He won major titles in his career as a player. Atlético was Brazilian champion in 1971, and Mineiro in 1970, 1976, and 1978. He played for Grêmio when it won its first Campeonato Brasileiro in 1981 and Campeonato Gaúcho in 1979 and 1980. He coached Al-Hilal to win the Arab Club Champions Cup in 1994.
