= Luis González (footballer, born 1958) =

Bolivian footballer

Personal information
- Full name: Luis González Roca
- Date of birth: 30 January 1958 (age 68)

International career
Years	Team	Apps	(Gls)
1979–1981	Bolivia	2	(0)

Luis González Roca (born 30 January 1958) is a Bolivian footballer. He played in two matches for the Bolivia national football team from 1979 to 1981. He was also part of Bolivia's squad for the 1979 Copa América tournament.
