= Ecuador Figuerora =

Ecuadorian footballer (born 1953)

Ecuador Figueroa
Personal information
- Date of birth: 18 March 1953 (age 73)
- Position: Defender

International career
Years	Team	Apps	(Gls)
1979	Ecuador	1	(0)

Ecuador Figueroa (born 18 March 1953) is an Ecuadorian footballer. He played in one match for the Ecuador national football team in 1979. He was also part of Ecuador's squad for the 1979 Copa América tournament.
