= Ricardo Mier =

Uruguayan footballer (born 1952)

Personal information
- Full name: Ricardo Santiago Mier Segovia
- Date of birth: 14 January 1952 (age 74)
- Position: Defender

International career
Years	Team	Apps	(Gls)
1975	Uruguay	3	(0)

Ricardo Santiago Mier Segovia (born 14 January 1952) is a Uruguayan footballer. He played in three matches for the Uruguay national football team in 1975. He was also part of Uruguay's squad for the 1975 Copa América tournament.
