= Jesús Rubio (Colombian footballer) =

Colombian footballer (born 1945)

Personal information
- Full name: Jesús María Rubio Hernández
- Date of birth: 29 March 1945 (age 81)
- Place of birth: Barranquilla, Colombia
- Position: Defender

International career
Years	Team	Apps	(Gls)
1975	Colombia	3	(0)

Jesús María Rubio Hernández (born 29 March 1945) is a Colombian footballer. He played in three matches for the Colombia national football team in 1975. He was also part of Colombia's squad for the 1975 Copa América tournament.
