= Jorge Alarcón (footballer) =

Ecuadorian footballer (born 1956)

Personal information
- Date of birth: 8 February 1956 (age 70)

International career
Years	Team	Apps	(Gls)
1979	Ecuador	7	(2)

Jorge Alarcón (born 8 February 1956) is an Ecuadorian footballer. He played in seven matches for the Ecuador national football team in 1979. He was also part of Ecuador's squad for the 1979 Copa América tournament.
