= César Valverde =

Colombian footballer (born 1951)

Personal information
- Full name: César Fredy Arce Valverde
- Date of birth: 23 August 1951 (age 75)
- Place of birth: Buga, Colombia
- Position: Midfielder

International career
Years	Team	Apps	(Gls)
1979–1981	Colombia	5	(1)

César Valverde (born 23 August 1951) is a Colombian footballer. He played in five matches for the Colombia national football team from 1979 to 1981. He was also part of Colombia's squad for the 1979 Copa América tournament.
