= José Chaparro =

Colombian footballer (born 1954)

Personal information
- Full name: José Gabriel Chaparro Sánchez
- Date of birth: 2 July 1954 (age 72)
- Position: Midfielder

International career
Years	Team	Apps	(Gls)
1979	Colombia	4	(1)

José Chaparro (born 2 July 1954) is a Colombian former footballer. He played in four matches for the Colombia national football team in 1979. He was also part of Colombia's squad for the 1979 Copa América tournament.
