= Carlos Peruena =

Uruguayan footballer (1955–2018)

Personal information
- Full name: Carlos Eduardo Peruena Rodríguez
- Date of birth: 13 March 1955
- Place of birth: Florida, Uruguay
- Date of death: 2 June 2018 (aged 63)
- Place of death: Barinas, Venezuela
- Height: 1.78 m (5 ft 10 in)
- Position: Defender

Youth career
- 1975–1978: Peñarol

Senior career*
Years	Team	Apps	(Gls)
1978–1982	Betis	100	(3)
1982–1983	Oviedo	34	(1)
1983–1985	Granada	45	(2)
1986	Olimpia Asunción		
1987	Cerrito		
1988	Atlético Zamora		

International career
1975–1978	Uruguay	4	(1)
- * Club domestic league appearances and goals

Carlos Eduardo Peruena Rodríguez (13 March 1955 – 2 June 2018), known as "Toto", was a Uruguayan football defender.

== Biography ==
He began his career in youth teams of Uruguayan club C.A. Peñarol, from which he was bought in 1978 for 15 million pesetas by Spanish outfit Real Betis. He played 83 league games for Betis, scoring 2 goals. In 1982 he joined Oviedo, making his debut for the team on 5 September 1982 against Linares in Segunda División match (3:0), scoring the second goal of the match. Later in his career he played for Granada. His last clubs were Olimpia Asunción from Paraguay and Cerrito from Uruguay. In 1988 he settled in Venezuela, living here for 3 decades and became youth coach in Club Deportivo Español de Barinas. The last years of his life he faced serious health problems, after it was being discovered that he had a tumor, and heart problems, which prevented the surgery operation.

Carlos Peruena died on 2 June 2018 from heart failure in Barinas, Venezuela.

== International career ==
Peruena made 4 appearances for the Uruguay national football team from 1975 to 1978, and was the participant of Copa América 1975 tournament.
