= Daniel Díaz (Chilean footballer) =

Chilean footballer (born 1948)

Personal information
- Full name: Daniel Orlando Díaz Muñoz
- Date of birth: 7 August 1948 (age 78)
- Place of birth: Santiago, Chile
- Height: 1.70 m (5 ft 7 in)
- Position: Right-back

Youth career
- Iriarte Hermanos
- Defensor San Andrés
- Universidad Católica

Senior career*
Years	Team	Apps	(Gls)
1966–1971	Universidad Católica		
1972–1976	Huachipato		
1977–1982	Colo-Colo	147	(3)
1982	Rangers		
1983	Moroka Swallows		

International career
1967	Chile U20		
1969–1977	Chile	23	(0)
- * Club domestic league appearances and goals

Daniel Orlando Díaz Muñoz (born 7 August 1948) is a Chilean former professional footballer who played as a right-back for four clubs of Chile and the Chile national team.

== Club career ==
- Universidad Católica 1968–1971
- Huachipato 1972–1976
- Colo Colo 1977–1982
- Rangers 1982
- Moroka Swallows 1983

== International career ==
Díaz represented Chile at under-20 level in the 1967 South American Championship.

At senior level, he made 23 appearances for Chile national team, including the 1975 Copa América.

== Honours ==
Huachipato

- Chilean Primera División: 1974

Colo Colo

- Chilean Primera División: 1979, 1981
- Copa Chile: 1981, 1982
