= Alonso López (footballer) =

Colombian footballer (1956–2026)

Personal information
- Full name: Alonso López Palacio
- Date of birth: 27 May 1956
- Place of birth: Manizales, Colombia
- Date of death: 12 April 2026 (aged 69)
- Place of death: Manizales, Colombia
- Position: Left-back

Senior career*
Years	Team	Apps	(Gls)
1974–1985	Millonarios F.C.		
1981	→ Independiente Medellín (loan)		
1986–1987	Cristal Caldas		
1987	Unión Magdalena		

International career
1976	Colombia	12	(0)
- * Club domestic league appearances and goals

Alonso López Palacio (27 May 1956 – 12 April 2026) was a Colombian footballer who played as a left-back. He made 12 appearances for the Colombia national team between 1976 and 1985. He was also part of Colombia's squad for the 1975 Copa América tournament.

López died on 12 April 2026, at the age of 69. His death was reported in Colombian media and confirmed in an official statement by the División Mayor del Fútbol Profesional Colombiano (DIMAYOR).
