= Jorge Gáspari =

Argentine footballer

Personal information
- Date of birth: 3 November 1958 (age 67)
- Position: Midfielder

International career
Years	Team	Apps	(Gls)
1979	Argentina	5	(1)

Jorge Gáspari (born 3 November 1958) is an Argentine footballer who played as a midfielder. He played in five matches for the Argentina national football team in 1979. He was also part of Argentina's squad for the 1979 Copa América tournament, scoring his only international goal in a 3–0 home win over Bolivia.
