= Carlos Espósito =

Argentine football referee

Carlos Alfonso Espósito (November 4, 1941 – November 28, 2025) was an Argentine retired football referee. He is known for having refereed two matches in the 1986 FIFA World Cup in Mexico.
