= José de la Cruz (footballer) =

Paraguayan footballer (born 1952)

Benítez
Personal information
- Full name: José de La Cruz Benítez Santa Cruz
- Date of birth: 3 May 1952 (age 74)
- Place of birth: Asunción, Paraguay
- Position: Goalkeeper

Youth career
- 1966–1971: Club Olimpia

Senior career*
| Years | Team | Apps | (Gls) |
| 1971–1977 | Club Olimpia | | |
| 1977–1983 | Internacional | 85 | (0) |
| 1978 | → Palmeiras (loan) | 24 | (0) |

International career
| 1972–1977 | Paraguay | 8 | (0) |
- * Club domestic league appearances and goals

José de La Cruz Benitez Santa Cruz (born 3 May 1952 in Asunción), is a former football player who played as a goalkeeper.

Benítez started in the youth divisions of Olimpia Asunción and made his debut with the first team squad in 1971. In 1977, he was transferred to Internacional of Brazil where he won several titles and became a favorite among the fans. In a friendly match on 4 December 1983, Benítez suffered a severe injury after colliding with another player during a game which forced Benítez to end his football career.

He made 94 appearances in the Campeonato Brasileiro for Internacional and Palmeiras.

Benítez made an appearance for the Paraguay national football team in a 1978 FIFA World Cup qualifying match against Brazil.

== Titles ==
- Under-20 South American Champion: 1971 (with the Paraguay national football team)
- Paraguayan League: 1971, 1975 (with Olimpia)
- Campeonato Gaúcho: 1978, 1981, 1982, 1983 (with Internacional de Porto Alegre)
- Campeonato Brasileiro: 1979 (with Internacional de Porto Alegre)
