= Ioannis Malachias =

Greek physician and revolutionary (1880–1958)

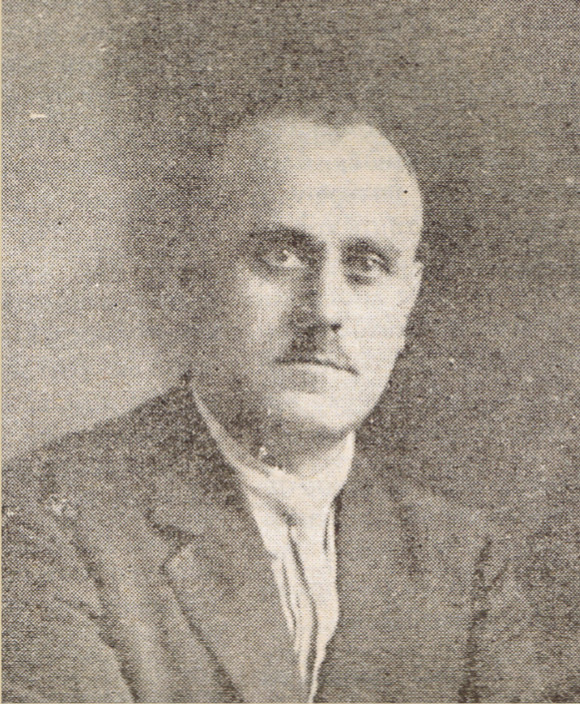
- Born: 1880; Xylosyrtis, Ikaria, Greece
- Died: 1958 (aged 77–78); Agios Kirykos, Ikaria, Greece
- Occupation: Physician
- Known for: President of the Free State of Ikaria (17 July 1912-4 November 1912), Leader of the 1912 Ikarian Revolution against the Ottoman Empire

Ioannis Malachias (Greek: Ιωάννης Μαλαχίας; also spelled Malahias and often referred to as Dr Malachias) was born in Xylosyrtis, Ikaria, in 1880 and died in Agios Kirykos, Ikaria, in 1958. He was a Greek doctor from Ikaria and was the leader of the Ikarian Revolution against the Ottoman Empire in 1912, serving as the first and only president of the Free State of Ikaria between 17 July and 4 November 1912.

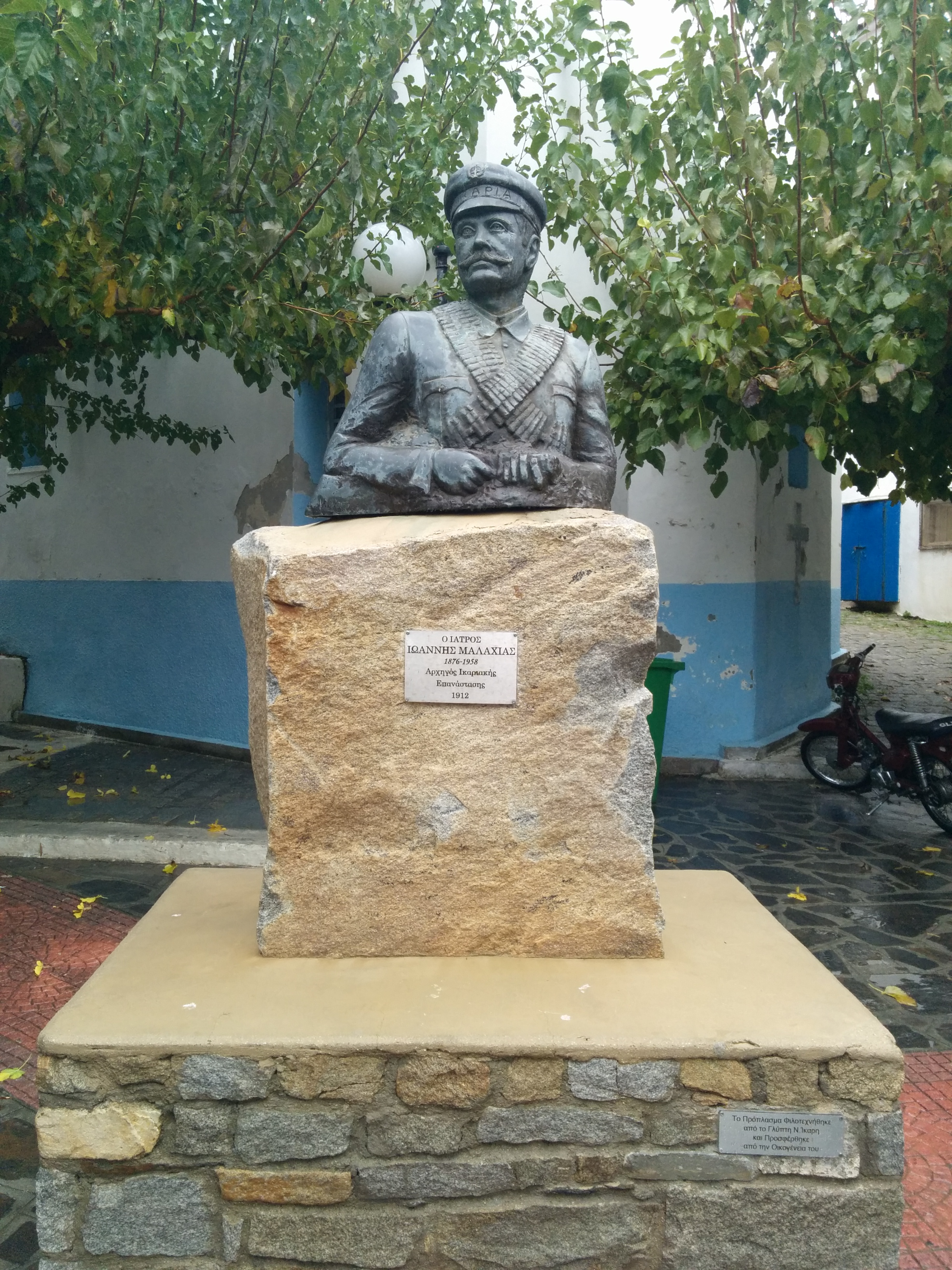
Bust of Ioannis Malachias in Agios Kirykos, Ikaria, Greece
