= Wilmer Gómez =

Ecuadorian footballer (born 1951)

Personal information
- Date of birth: 15 May 1951 (age 75)
- Position: Midfielder

International career
Years	Team	Apps	(Gls)
1975	Ecuador	1	(0)

Wilmer Gómez (born 15 May 1951) is an Ecuadorian footballer. He played in one match for the Ecuador national football team in 1975. He was also part of Ecuador's squad for the 1975 Copa América tournament.
