= Rafael Otero =

Colombian footballer (born 1954)

Personal information
- Date of birth: 14 December 1954 (age 71)
- Position: Midfielder

International career
Years	Team	Apps	(Gls)
1979–1981	Colombia	4	(0)

Rafael Otero (born 14 December 1954) is a Colombian footballer. He played in four matches for the Colombia national football team from 1979 to 1981. He was also part of Colombia's squad for the 1979 Copa América tournament.
