= Orlando Torres =

Venezuelan footballer (born 1946)

Personal information
- Date of birth: 18 July 1946 (age 80)
- Position: Defender

International career
| Years | Team | Apps | (Gls) |
| 1975 | Venezuela | 4 | (0) |

Orlando Torres Marín (born 18 July 1946) is a Venezuelan footballer. He played in four matches for the Venezuela national football team in 1975. He was also part of Venezuela's squad for the 1975 Copa América tournament.
