= Asdrúbal Sánchez =

Venezuelan footballer (born 1958)

Personal information
- Full name: Asdrúbal José Sánchez
- Date of birth: 1 April 1958 (age 68)
- Position: Midfielder

International career
Years	Team	Apps	(Gls)
1979–1987	Venezuela	20	(0)

Asdrúbal José Sánchez (born 1 April 1958) is a Venezuelan footballer. He competed in the men's tournament at the 1980 Summer Olympics.
