= Álvaro Muñoz (footballer) =

Colombian footballer (born 1954)

Personal information
- Full name: Álvaro Muñoz Castro
- Date of birth: 17 May 1954 (age 72)
- Position: Midfielder

International career
Years	Team	Apps	(Gls)
1979	Colombia	2	(0)

Álvaro Muñoz Castro (born 17 May 1954) is a Colombian footballer. He played in two matches for the Colombia national football team in 1979. He was also part of Colombia's squad for the 1979 Copa América tournament.
