= Ernesto Labarthe =

Peruvian footballer (born 1956)

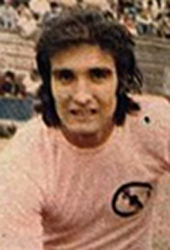
- Labarthe with Sport Boys in 1978

Personal information
- Full name: Ernesto Enrique Labarthe Flores
- Date of birth: June 2, 1956 (age 70)
- Place of birth: Lima, Peru
- Position: Forward

Senior career*
Years	Team	Apps	(Gls)
1974–1978	Sport Boys		
1979	Palestino	14	(2)
1980	Sport Boys	9	(2)
1980–1981	Monterrey	6	(2)
1981–1983	Sport Boys		

International career
1979	Peru	4	(0)
- * Club domestic league appearances and goals

Ernesto Enrique Labarthe Flores (born June 2, 1956 in Lima, Peru) is a Peruvian retired footballer who played as a midfielder.

== Club career ==
The son of Sport Boys' president, Labarthe began his professional football career with Sport Boys. After impressing for the Peruvian club, he signed for Monterrey in Mexico for the 1980–81 season. After scoring twice in three matches, Labarthe lost his place in the side and only made three further appearances for Monterrey before leaving the club. After returning to play in Peru, he had another brief stint abroad with Palestino in Chile.

== International career ==
He was a non-playing squad member at the 1978 FIFA World Cup.

== Personal ==
Labarthe's son, Gianfranco, is also a former professional footballer.
