= Juan Manuel Villalba =

Paraguayan footballer (born 1954)

Personal information
- Date of birth: 14 April 1954 (age 72)

International career
Years	Team	Apps	(Gls)
1979	Paraguay	3	(0)

Juan Manuel Villalba (born 14 April 1954) is a Paraguayan footballer. He played in three matches for the Paraguay national football team in 1979. He was also part of Paraguay's squad for the 1979 Copa América tournament.
