= Rafael Pavón =

Argentine footballer

Personal information
- Full name: Rafael Tomás Eloy Pavón Parrilla
- Date of birth: 5 December 1951 (age 74)
- Place of birth: Córdoba, Argentina
- Position: Defender

Senior career*
Years	Team	Apps	(Gls)
1971–1975	Belgrano	47	(0)
1975–1976	Real Sociedad	0	(0)
1976–1978	Alavés	21	(0)
1978–1982	Talleres	104	(1)

International career
1975	Argentina	2	(0)
- * Club domestic league appearances and goals

Rafael Tomás Eloy Pavón Parrilla (born 5 December 1951) is an Argentine former footballer who played as a defender. He played in two matches for the Argentina national football team in 1975. He was also part of Argentina's squad for the 1975 Copa América tournament.
