= Vicente Vega =

Venezuelan footballer (1955–2025)

Personal information
- Date of birth: 21 February 1955
- Place of birth: Maracay, Venezuela
- Date of death: 13 January 2025 (aged 69)
- Place of death: Venezuela
- Position: Goalkeeper

Senior career*
Years	Team	Apps	(Gls)
1975–1977	Deportivo Táchira		
1977–1986	Portuguesa		
1987–1991	Deportivo Italia		

International career
1975–1983	Venezuela	15	(0)
- * Club domestic league appearances and goals

Vicente Vega (21 February 1955 – 13 January 2025) was a Venezuelan footballer who played as a goalkeeper. He was part of Venezuela's squads for the 1975, 1979 and 1983 Copa Américas. Vega died from complications of diabetes on 13 January 2025, at the age of 69.
