= Andrés Rebottaro =

Argentine footballer and manager

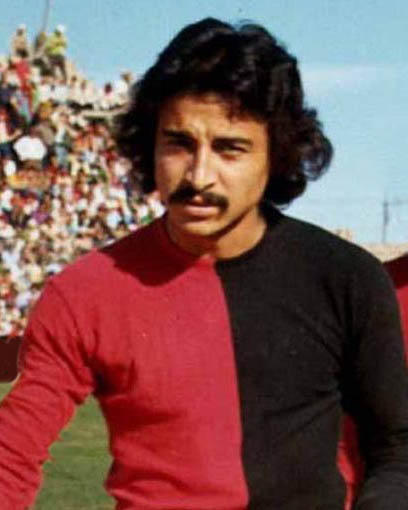
- Rebottaro with Newell's Old Boys

Personal information
- Full name: Andrés Orlando Rebottaro
- Date of birth: 5 September 1952 (age 74)
- Place of birth: Rosario, Argentina
- Position: Defender

Youth career
- Newell's Old Boys

Senior career*
Years	Team	Apps	(Gls)
1970–1978	Newell's Old Boys	251	(6)
1979	Boca Juniors	9	(0)
1980	Tigre	?	(?)
1981	Colón de Santa Fe	?	(?)

International career
1974–1976	Argentina	?	(?)

Managerial career
- 1990s: Atlético Tucumán
- 1999–2000: Newell's Old Boys
- 2003–2004: Atlético Tucumán
- 2004–2005: Aldosivi
- 2005–2006: Atlético Tucumán
- 2007–2009: Aldosivi
- 2010: Talleres de Córdoba
- * Club domestic league appearances and goals as of November 2008

Andrés Orlando Rebottaro (born 5 September 1952 in Rosario) is a former Argentine football defender who played most of his career for Newell's Old Boys.

== Club career ==
Rebottaro came through the Newell's Old Boys youth system to make his professional debut in 1970. In 1974 he was part of the team that won the Metropolitano championship. He made 250 appearances for the club between 1970 and 1978.

In 1979, he played for Boca Juniors, he wound down his playing career with Club Atlético Tigre in 1980 and Colón de Santa Fe in 1981.

== International career ==
Rebottaro played for the Argentina national team in the 1970s including appearances in the Copa América 1975

== Managerial career ==
Rebottaro worked as the manager of Atlético Tucumán in the 1990s and in 1999 he became manager of Newell's Old Boys in the Argentine Primera.

In 2003, he returned to Atlético Tucumán where he led the team to the Torneo Argentino A Clausura championship in 2003. In 2004, he took over as the manager of Aldosivi and led them to the Torneo Argentino A Clausura 2005 championship and promotion to the Argentine 2nd division.

In 2005, he returned to Atlético Tucumán and in 2007 he joined Aldosivi again as youth team coach, only to take over as manager in October 2007. In 2010, he joined Talleres de Córdoba
