= Luis Eduardo González =

Uruguayan polling specialist (1945–2016)

Luis Eduardo González (28 October 1945 – 10 September 2016) was a Uruguayan political scientist, sociologist and polling specialist. He was a professor at the University of the Republic and the Catholic University. He published, among others, in the Uruguayan Journal of Political Science, the Latin American Research Review, and the Mexican Journal of Sociology.

He was known for his analysis and predictions on voting trends (national, departmental, plebiscites) and in reference to opinion polls, as well as for his frequent appearances on Uruguayan television.

== Biography ==
A deaf person, he was known for his voting turnout predictions. He was noted for his ability to listen to all tendencies.

Magister in Sociology, Department of Social Sciences, Fundación Bariloche, Argentina, 1976. He held a PhD in political science from Yale University, 1988. He lectured at Universidad de la República and UCUDAL.

He worked alongside César Aguiar at Equipos Consultores until 1992.

In 1992, he founded the polling firm CIFRA - González, Raga y Asociados. together with his wife, Adriana Raga.

He worked as a consultant for IADB, INTAL, United Nations, and the World Bank.

Author of several specialized publications:

- Political Structures and Democracy in Uruguay, Notre Dame University Press, 1991.
- Los partidos políticos uruguayos en tiempos de cambio. UCUDAL/Fundación Banco de Boston, año 1999.
