= Fausto Carrera =

Ecuadorian footballer (born 1950)

Personal information
- Date of birth: 12 March 1950 (age 76)
- Position: Defender

International career
Years	Team	Apps	(Gls)
1975	Ecuador	2	(0)

Fausto Carrera (born 12 March 1950) is an Ecuadorian former footballer. He played in two matches for the Ecuador national football team in 1975. He was also part of Ecuador's squad for the 1975 Copa América tournament.
