= Víctor Peláez =

Ecuadorian footballer (born 1947)

Personal information
- Full name: Víctor Hugo Peláez
- Date of birth: 12 February 1947 (age 79)
- Position: Defender

International career
Years	Team	Apps	(Gls)
1973–1975	Ecuador	5	(0)

Víctor Peláez (born 12 February 1947) is an Ecuadorian footballer. He played in five matches for the Ecuador national football team from 1973 to 1975. He was also part of Ecuador's squad for the 1975 Copa América tournament.
