= Luis Granda =

Ecuadorian footballer (born 1955)

Personal information
- Date of birth: 22 July 1955 (age 71)
- Place of birth: Quito, Ecuador

International career
Years	Team	Apps	(Gls)
1977–1983	Ecuador	21	(0)

Luis Granda (born 22 July 1955) is an Ecuadorian footballer. He played in 21 matches for the Ecuador national football team from 1977 to 1983. He was also part of Ecuador's squad for the 1979 Copa América tournament.
