= Mario Tenorio =

Ecuadorian footballer (born 1957)

Personal information
- Date of birth: 21 August 1957 (age 69)

International career
Years	Team	Apps	(Gls)
1979–1983	Ecuador	17	(1)

Mario Tenorio (born 21 August 1957) is an Ecuadorian footballer. He played in 17 matches for the Ecuador national football team from 1979 to 1983. He was also part of Ecuador's squad for the 1979 Copa América tournament.

== Career statistics ==
=== International ===
Appearances and goals by national team and year
National team	Year	Apps	Goals
Ecuador	1979	7	1
Ecuador	1980	–	
Ecuador	1981	5	0
Ecuador	1982	–	
Ecuador	1983	5	0
Total		17	1

Scores and results list Ecuador's goal tally first, score column indicates score after each Tenorio goal.

List of international goals scored by Mario Tenorio
No.	Date	Venue	Opponent	Score	Result	Competition
1	5 September 1979	Atahualpa Olympic Stadium, Quito, Ecuador	Uruguay	1–0	2–1	1979 Copa América
