= Alcides Báez =

Paraguayan footballer (1947–2023)

Personal information
- Full name: Alcides Antonio Báez Fleytas
- Date of birth: 17 January 1947
- Place of birth: Asunción, Paraguay
- Date of death: 8 October 2023 (aged 76)
- Position: Goalkeeper

Senior career*
Years	Team	Apps	(Gls)
- Cerro Porteño
- Libertad
1974-75	Tenerife	18	(0)

International career
1971–1979	Paraguay	16	(0)
- * Club domestic league appearances and goals

Alcides Antonio Báez Fleytas (17 January 1947 – 8 October 2023) was a Paraguayan footballer who played as a goalkeeper. He made 16 appearances for the Paraguay national team from 1971 to 1979. He was also part of Paraguay's squad for the 1979 Copa América tournament. Báez died on 8 October 2023, at the age of 76.
