= Francisco Riveros =

Paraguayan footballer (born 1946)

Personal information
- Date of birth: 11 July 1946 (age 80)
- Place of birth: Yaguarón, Paraguay

International career
Years	Team	Apps	(Gls)
1972–1975	Paraguay	4	(0)

Francisco Riveros (born 11 July 1946) is a Paraguayan footballer. He played in four matches for the Paraguay national football team from 1972 to 1975. He was also part of Paraguay's squad for the 1975 Copa América tournament.
