= Jaime Lima =

Bolivian footballer (born 1949)

Personal information
- Date of birth: 2 November 1949 (age 76)
- Position: Defender

International career
Years	Team	Apps	(Gls)
1975–1977	Bolivia	5	(0)

Jaime Lima (born 2 November 1949) is a Bolivian footballer. He played in five matches for the Bolivia national football team from 1975 to 1977. He was also part of Bolivia's squad for the 1975 Copa América tournament.
