= Roberto Díaz (footballer) =

Argentine footballer

Personal information
- Full name: Roberto Osvaldo Díaz
- Date of birth: 3 March 1953 (age 73)
- Place of birth: Buenos Aires, Argentina
- Height: 1.83 m (6 ft 0 in)
- Position: Forward

Senior career*
Years	Team	Apps	(Gls)
1970–1971	Chacarita Juniors	6	(0)
1972–1974	Estudiantes BA	38	(19)
1975–1980	Racing Club	244	(51)
1980–1981	América		
1981–1982	León		
1982–1983	Racing Club		
1983	Loma Negra		
1983	Fernández Vial	9	(1)
1984	Banfield	11	(2)
1985	Douglas Haig		
1985	Real Potosí		

International career
1979	Argentina	6	(1)
- * Club domestic league appearances and goals

Roberto Osvaldo Díaz (born 3 March 1953) is an Argentine footballer who played as a forward. He played in six matches for the Argentina national football team in 1979. He was also part of Argentina's squad for the 1979 Copa América tournament, scoring his only international goal in a 2–2 home draw against rivals Brazil.

== Teams ==
- (Argentina) Chacarita Juniors 1970–1971
- (Argentina) Estudiantes de Buenos Aires 1972–1974
- (Argentina) Racing Club 1975–1980
- (Mexico) América 1980–1981
- (Mexico) León 1981–1982
- (Argentina) Racing Club 1982–1983
- (Argentina) Loma Negra 1983
- (Chile) Fernández Vial 1983
- (Argentina) Banfield 1984
- (Argentina) Douglas Haig 1985
- (Bolivia) Real Potosí 1985
