= Eugenio Morel =

Paraguayan footballer (born 1950)

Personal information
- Full name: Eugenio Félix Morel Bogado
- Date of birth: 2 February 1950 (age 76)
- Place of birth: Asunción, Paraguay
- Position: Left forward

Youth career
- Racing Club

Senior career*
| Years | Team | Apps | (Gls) |
| 1969–1972 | Racing Club | 19 | (4) |
| 1972–1973 | Talleres RE | 18 | (6) |
| 1973–1974 | Ingeniero White | | (11) |
| 1974–1979 | Libertad | 432 | (231) |
| 1980–1981 | Argentinos Juniors | 59 | (11) |
| 1982 | San Lorenzo | 40 | (8) |
| 1983 | Cerro Porteño | | |
| 1984 | Oriente Petrolero | | |
| 1985 | Sportivo Piazza | – | (–) |
| 1987 | O'Higgins | | |
| 1989 | Tacuary | | |
- 2 de Febrero
- 3 de Mayo
- 8 de Diciembre FBC

International career
| 1979–1981 | Paraguay | 14 | (5) |
- * Club domestic league appearances and goals

Eugenio Félix Morel Bogado (born 2 February 1950) is a former Paraguayan professional footballer who played as a left forward.

He has been characterized as a talented left-footed player who scored many goals playing the left forward position.

== Childhood and youth ==
Morel was seven years old when his family decided to go to Argentina in 1957. With other hopes in the great Buenos Aires, he started to practice football which eventually will become his living for many years to come.

== Career ==
Morel played his first games in Racing Club in Argentina in 1969, showing his quality in the tough Argentine football leagues. He had his debut in the first division league in 1970. Other teams he played for include Talleres de Remedios de Escalada (1972), Ingeniero White from Banderaló, Libertad of Paraguay (1974 to 1979), Argentinos Juniors (1980 to 1981), San Lorenzo de Almagro (1982), Cerro Porteño of Asunción (1983) and Oriente Petrolero of Bolivia (1984). Later on he played for clubs of the countryside of Paraguay between 1986 and 1987 and also had brief stints at O'Higgins of Chile (1987); Tacuary (1989); Club 2 de Febrero and Club 3 de Mayo of Capiatá and Club 8 de Diciembre of Fernando de la Mora. He retired at the age of 46.

One of his most memorable goals happened at the 1979 Copa América, when he scored a bicycle kick goal against Brazil in the Estadio Defensores del Chaco in Asunción. The goal allowed Paraguay to advance to the finals and eventually win the Copa America tournament for the second time in history.

== Personal life ==
His sons are Juan Eduardo, Claudio Marcelo, Emmanuel Andrés, Eugenio Ricardo, Pablo Sebastián and Félix Nicolás. Of all of them, Claudio is the only one that followed his steps by becoming a successful football player.

== Honours ==
=== Player ===
==== Club ====
Argentinos Juniors

- Argentine Primera División Runners-up: 1980–81

==== International ====
Paraguay

- Copa América: 1979
