= Andrés Arizaleta =

Venezuelan footballer (1950–2023)

Personal information
- Full name: Andrés Augusto Arizaleta Galindo
- Date of birth: 23 February 1950
- Place of birth: Caracas, Venezuela
- Date of death: 22 April 2023 (aged 73)
- Place of death: Barinas, Venezuela
- Position: Goalkeeper

Senior career*
Years	Team	Apps	(Gls)
1973-1974	Deportivo Portugués		
1974-1976	Poruguesa FC		
1976-1979	Deportivo Portugués		
1979-1980	Deportivo Italia		
1980-1987	Atlético Zamora		

International career
1975-1981	Venezuela	7	(0)
- * Club domestic league appearances and goals

Andrés Arizaleta (23 February 1950 – 22 April 2023) was a Venezuelan footballer. He was part of Venezuela's squad for the 1975 Copa América tournament. Arizaleta died on 22 April 2023, at the age of 73.
