= Carlos Jiménez (Bolivian footballer) =

Bolivian footballer (born 1948)

Personal information
- Full name: Carlos Conrado Jiménez Hurtado
- Date of birth: 10 February 1948 (age 78)
- Place of birth: San Ignacio de Velasco, Bolivia
- Position: Goalkeeper

Senior career*
| Years | Team | Apps | (Gls) |
| 1971–1972 | Chaco Petrolero | | |
| 1973–1981 | Bolívar | | |

International career
| 1973–1981 | Bolivia | 36 | (0) |
- * Club domestic league appearances and goals

Carlos Conrado Jiménez Hurtado (born 10 February 1948) is a Bolivian former footballer who played as a goalkeeper. He played in 36 matches for the Bolivia national football team from 1973 to 1981. He was also part of Bolivia's squad for the 1975 Copa América tournament.
