= Freddy Vargas (Bolivian footballer) =

Bolivian footballer (born 1951)

Personal information
- Date of birth: 13 January 1951 (age 75)
- Position: Midfielder

International career
Years	Team	Apps	(Gls)
1973–1975	Bolivia	3	(0)

Freddy Vargas (born 13 January 1951) is a Bolivian footballer.

== Professional career ==
He played in three matches for the Bolivia national football team from 1973 to 1975. He was also part of Bolivia's squad for the 1975 Copa América tournament.
