= Eduardo Angulo (footballer) =

Bolivian footballer (born 1953)

Personal information
- Date of birth: 2 March 1953 (age 73)
- Position: Defender

International career
Years	Team	Apps	(Gls)
1975–1979	Bolivia	8	(0)

Eduardo Angulo (born 2 March 1953) is a Bolivian footballer. He played in eight matches for the Bolivia national football team from 1975 to 1979. He was also part of Bolivia's squad for the 1975 Copa América tournament.
