= Pedro Castro (footballer, born 1947) =

Venezuelan footballer

Personal information
- Full name: Pedro Castro Eiroa
- Date of birth: 15 November 1947 (age 78)
- Place of birth: A Coruña, Spain
- Position: Defender

International career
Years	Team	Apps	(Gls)
1975–1981	Venezuela	7	(0)

Pedro Castro Eiroa (born 15 November 1947) is a Venezuelan footballer. He played in seven matches for the Venezuela national football team from 1975 to 1981. He was also part of Venezuela's squad for the 1975 Copa América tournament.
