= Mario Zoryez =

Uruguayan footballer (born 1950)

Personal information
- Date of birth: 9 September 1950 (age 76)
- Place of birth: Río Negro, Uruguay
- Position: Defender

International career
Years	Team	Apps	(Gls)
1973–1979	Uruguay	4	(0)

Mario Zoryez (born 9 September 1950) is a Uruguayan footballer. He played in four matches for the Uruguay national football team from 1973 to 1979. He was also part of Uruguay's squad for the 1975 Copa América tournament.
