= Luis Marquina (footballer) =

Venezuelan footballer (born 1952)

Personal information
- Date of birth: 12 November 1952 (age 73)
- Position: Defender

International career
Years	Team	Apps	(Gls)
1975	Venezuela	4	(0)

Luis Marquina (born 12 November 1952) is a Venezuelan footballer. He played in four matches for the Venezuela national football team in 1975. He was also part of Venezuela's squad for the 1975 Copa América tournament.
