= Pedro Fleitas =

Paraguayan footballer (born 1953)

Personal information
- Date of birth: 11 July 1953 (age 73)
- Place of birth: Itacurubí de la Cordillera, Paraguay

International career
Years	Team	Apps	(Gls)
1974–1979	Paraguay	9	(0)

Pedro Fleitas (born 11 July 1953) is a Paraguayan footballer. He played in nine matches for the Paraguay national football team from 1974 to 1979. He was also part of Paraguay's squad for the 1975 Copa América tournament.
