= Juan Carlos Fernández (footballer) =

Bolivian footballer (born 1946)

Personal information
- Date of birth: 25 October 1946 (age 80)
- Position: Forward

International career
Years	Team	Apps	(Gls)
1975	Bolivia	2	(0)

Juan Carlos Fernández (born 25 October 1946) is a Bolivian footballer. He played in two matches for the Bolivia national football team in 1975. He was also part of Bolivia's squad for the 1975 Copa América tournament.
