= Francisco Rivera (Paraguayan footballer) =

Paraguayan footballer (born 1951)

Personal information
- Date of birth: 15 May 1951 (age 75)

International career
Years	Team	Apps	(Gls)
1975–1976	Paraguay	5	(0)

Francisco Rivera (born 15 May 1951) is a Paraguayan footballer. He played in five matches for the Paraguay national football team from 1975 to 1976. He was also part of Paraguay's squad for the 1975 Copa América tournament.
