= Carlos Ángel López =

Argentine footballer (1952–2018)

Personal information
- Full name: Carlos Ángel López Llanes
- Date of birth: 17 July 1952
- Place of birth: Posadas, Misiones Province, Argentina
- Date of death: 30 September 2018 (aged 66)
- Place of death: San Salvador de Jujuy, Argentina
- Position: Midfielder

Senior career*
Years	Team	Apps	(Gls)
1972	River Plate		
1973	Argentinos Juniors	11	(0)
1975–1976	Estudiantes de La Plata		
1978–1979	Racing Club		
1980	Vélez Sarsfield		
1981	Sarmiento	30	(3)
1982–1983	Millonarios	81	(15)
1984	Boca Juniors	10	(0)
1984	Atlético Junior	24	(4)
1985–1992	Club Bolívar		
Total		156+	(22+)

International career
1979	Argentina	4	(1)
- * Club domestic league appearances and goals

Carlos Ángel López Llanes (17 July 1952 – 30 September 2018) was an Argentine professional footballer who played as a midfielder.

== Career ==
Born in Misiones Province, López played for River Plate, Argentinos Juniors, Estudiantes de La Plata, Racing Club, Vélez Sarsfield, Sarmiento, Millonarios, Boca Juniors, Atlético Junior and Club Bolívar.

He also scored 1 goal in 4 games for the Argentina national team.

== Later life and death ==
He died on 30 September 2018 at the age of 66.
