= Omar Ochoa (footballer) =

Venezuelan footballer (born 1952)

Personal information
- Date of birth: 8 May 1952 (age 74)
- Position: Defender

International career
| Years | Team | Apps | (Gls) |
| 1975–1981 | Venezuela | 5 | (0) |

Omar Ochoa (born 8 May 1952) is a Venezuelan footballer. He played in five matches for the Venezuela national football team from 1975 to 1981. He was also part of Venezuela's squad for the 1975 Copa América tournament.
