= Lorenzo Unanue =

Uruguayan footballer (born 1953)

Lorenzo Unanué
Personal information
- Full name: Lorenzo Walter Unanué Gordano
- Date of birth: 22 March 1953 (age 73)
- Place of birth: Montevideo, Uruguay
- Position: Midfielder

International career
Years	Team	Apps	(Gls)
1975–1979	Uruguay	9	(0)

Lorenzo Wálter Unanué Gordano (born 22 March 1953) is a Uruguayan footballer. He played in nine matches for the Uruguay national football team from 1975 to 1979. He was also part of Uruguay's squad for the 1975 Copa América tournament.
