= Jorge Wilstermann =

Bolivian commercial aviator

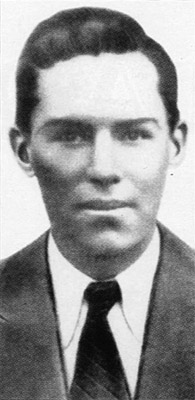

Personal details
- Born: Jorge Wilstermann Camacho; 23 April 1910 Punata, Cochabamba, Bolivia
- Died: 17 January 1936 (aged 25) Sipe Sipe, Cochabamba, Bolivia
- Cause of death: Plane crash
- Relations: Karl Wilhelm Wilstermann Junge (father); Delfina Camacho (mother)
- Occupation: Aviator, Lloyd Aéreo Boliviano

Jorge Wilstermann Camacho (Spanish pronunciation: [ˈxoɾxe (ɣ)wilsˈteɾman]; 23 April 1910 – 17 January 1936) was the first Bolivian commercial pilot. The son of a mechanic who worked for Lloyd Aéreo Boliviano, Wilstermann took an interest in aviation, and became Bolivia's first civilian aviator. Jorge Wilstermann died in 1936, after an aeroplane accident when flying the Cochabamba–Oruro route on his Junkers airplane. Wilstermann's pioneerism inspired homages in Bolivia. His friend and the then boss of Lloyd Aéreo Boliviano, Wálter Lemm, requested that the name of the local airport in Cochabamba and the local football team's name (which was started by people involved in aviation, workers for Lloyd Aéreo Boliviano) be changed to Jorge Wilstermann in his honour.

== See also ==
- Club Jorge Wilstermann
- Jorge Wilstermann International Airport
