= Carlos Delgado (footballer, born 1949) =

Ecuadorian footballer (1949–2002)

Personal information
- Full name: Carlos Omar Delgado
- Date of birth: 7 February 1949
- Place of birth: Esmeraldas, Ecuador
- Date of death: 1 December 2002 (aged 53)
- Position: Goalkeeper

International career
Years	Team	Apps	(Gls)
1975–1983	Ecuador	6	(0)

Carlos Omar Delgado (7 February 1949 – 1 December 2002) is an Ecuadorian footballer who played as a goalkeeper. He made six appearances for the Ecuador national team from 1975 to 1983. He was part of Ecuador's squad for the 1975 Copa América tournament.
