= Carlos Ron =

Ecuadorian footballer (born 1953)

Personal information
- Full name: Carlos René Ron Corella
- Date of birth: 16 December 1953 (age 72)
- Position: Midfielder

International career
Years	Team	Apps	(Gls)
1975–1979	Ecuador	6	(0)

Carlos Ron (born 16 December 1953) is an Ecuadorian footballer. He played in six matches for the Ecuador national football team from 1975 to 1979. He was also part of Ecuador's squad for the 1975 Copa América tournament.
