= Fausto Klinger =

Ecuadorian footballer

Personal information
- Full name: Fausto Francisco Klinger
- Date of birth: 15 April 1953 (age 73)
- Place of birth: Esmeraldas, Ecuador
- Position: Full-back

Senior career*
Years	Team	Apps	(Gls)
1972–1979	Deportivo Cuenca		
1980–1987	Barcelona SC		

International career
1975–1979	Ecuador	23	(1)
- * Club domestic league appearances and goals

Fausto Francisco Klinger (born 15 April 1953) is an Ecuadorian former footballer who played as a full-back for Deportivo Cuenca and Barcelona SC. He made 23 appearances for the Ecuador national team, scoring once.

Klinger was born in Esmeraldas. He won the Ecuadorian league four times with Barcelona SC.
