= 1979 Copa América =

Tournament details
- Dates: 18 July – 11 December
- Teams: 10 (from 1 confederation)

Final positions
- Champions: Paraguay (2nd title)
- Runners-up: Chile
- Third place: Peru; Brazil

Tournament statistics
- Matches played: 25
- Goals scored: 63 (2.52 per match)
- Attendance: 1,144,000 (45,760 per match)
- Top scorer(s): (Paraguay) Eugenio Morel (Chile) Jorge Peredo (4 goals each)
- Best player: (Chile) Carlos Caszely

The 1979 edition of the Copa América association football tournament was played between 18 July and 12 December. It was not held in a particular country, all matches were played on a home and away basis. Defending champions Peru were given a bye into the semi-finals.

== Group stage ==
The teams were drawn into three groups, consisting of three teams each. Each team played twice (home and away) against the other teams in their group, with two points for a win, one point for a draw, nil points for a loss. The winner of each group advanced to the semi-finals.

Peru qualified automatically as holders for the semifinal.

=== Group A ===
Team	Pld	W	D	L	GF	GA	GD	Pts
Chile	4	2	1	1	10	2	+8	5
Colombia	4	2	1	1	5	2	+3	5
Venezuela	4	0	2	2	1	12	−11	2

1 August 1979

Venezuela	0–0	Colombia

Pueblo Nuevo, San Cristóbal
Attendance: 18,000
Referee: Luis Barrancos (Bolivia)

8 August 1979

Venezuela	1–1	Chile
Carvajal 70'		Peredo 81'

Pueblo Nuevo, San Cristóbal
Attendance: 14,000
Referee: César Pagano (Peru)

15 August 1979

Colombia	1–0	Chile
Díaz 21'

Estadio El Campín, Bogotá
Attendance: 45,000
Referee: Romualdo Arppi Filho (Brazil)

22 August 1979

Colombia	4–0	Venezuela
Iguarán 17'; Valverde 53'; Chaparro 59'; Morón 86'

Estadio El Campín, Bogotá
Attendance: 30,000
Referee: Carlos Espósito (Argentina)

29 August 1979

Chile	7–0	Venezuela
Peredo 3', 59'; Véliz 31'; Rivas 38', 54' (pen.); Soto 80'; Yáñez 84'		Páez (red card)

Estadio Nacional, Santiago
Attendance: 70,000
Referee: Enrique Labó (Peru)

5 September 1979

Chile	2–0	Colombia
Caszely 14'; Peredo 58'		Valverde (red card) 54'

Estadio Nacional, Santiago
Attendance: 85,000
Referee: Wilfredo Cáceres (Paraguay)

=== Group B ===
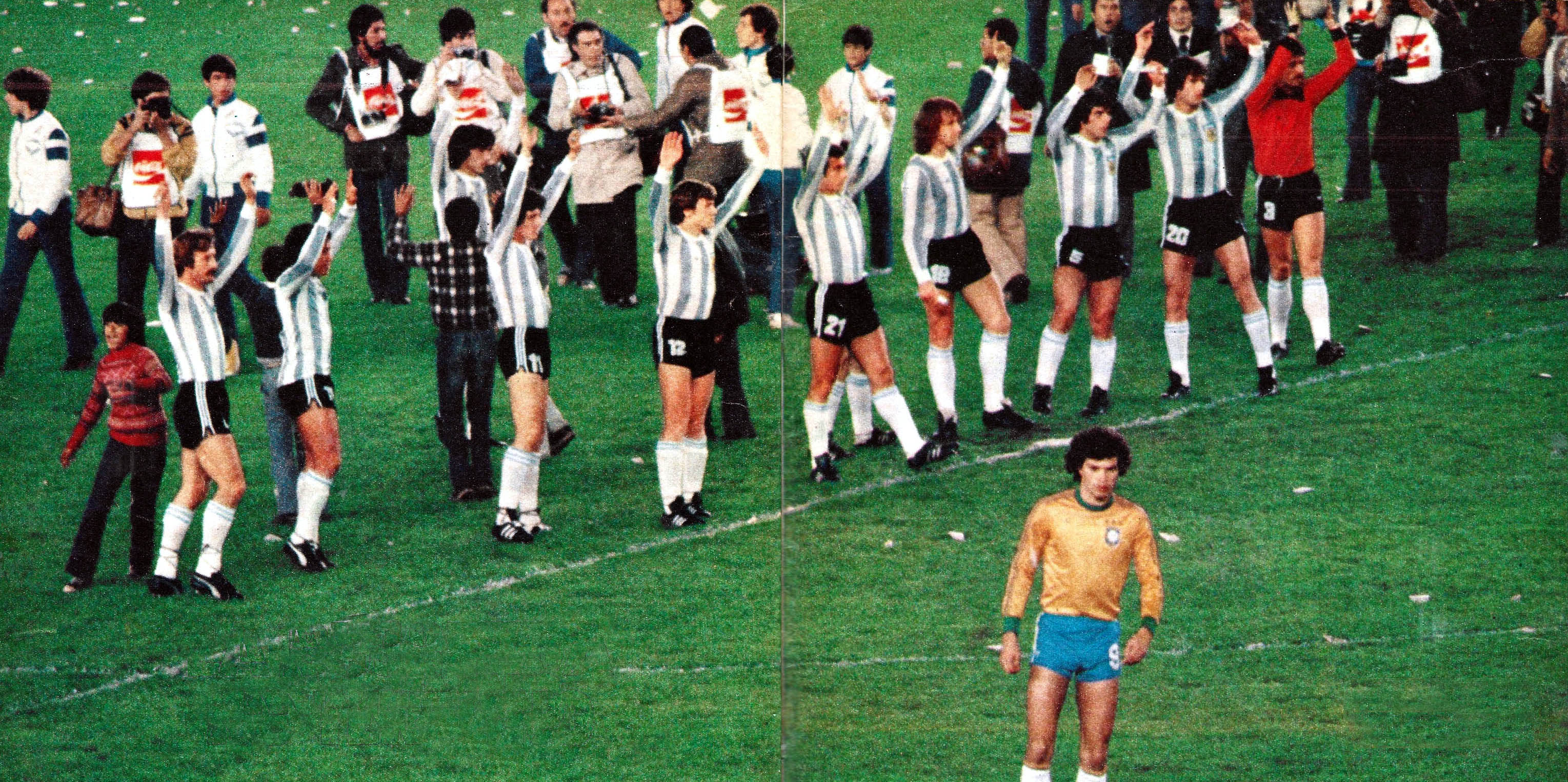
Argentina v Brazil match

Team	Pld	W	D	L	GF	GA	GD	Pts
Brazil	4	2	1	1	7	5	+2	5
Bolivia	4	2	0	2	4	7	−3	4
Argentina	4	1	1	2	7	6	+1	3

18 July 1979

Bolivia	2–1	Argentina
Reynaldo 29', 66'		López 5'

Estadio Hernando Siles, La Paz
Attendance: 40,000
Referee: Octavio Sierra (Colombia)

26 July 1979

Bolivia	2–1	Brazil
Aragonés 36' (pen.), 73'	Report	Roberto Dinamite 30' (pen.)

Estadio Hernando Siles, La Paz
Attendance: 40,000
Referee: Orlando Sánchez (Colombia)

2 August 1979

Brazil	2–1	Argentina
Zico 2'; Tita 54'	Report	Coscia 29'

Estádio do Maracanã, Rio de Janeiro
Attendance: 130,000
Referee: Edison Pérez (Peru)

8 August 1979

Argentina	3–0	Bolivia
Passarella 1'; Gáspari 15'; Maradona 65'

José Amalfitani Stadium, Buenos Aires
Attendance: 30,000
Referee: Sergio Vázquez Sánchez (Chile)

16 August 1979

Brazil	2–0	Bolivia
Tita 46'; Zico 90'	Report

Estádio do Morumbi, São Paulo
Attendance: 50,000
Referee: José Vergara Guerrero (Venezuela)

23 August 1979

Argentina	2–2	Brazil
Passarella 38'; Díaz 71'; Gallego (red card) 27'	Report	Sócrates 17', 65' (pen.); Zico (red card) 27'

Estadio Monumental, Buenos Aires
Attendance: 68,000
Referee: Roque Cerullo (Uruguay)

=== Group C ===
Team	Pld	W	D	L	GF	GA	GD	Pts
Paraguay	4	2	2	0	6	3	+3	6
Uruguay	4	1	2	1	5	5	0	4
Ecuador	4	1	0	3	4	7	−3	2

29 August 1979

Ecuador	1–2	Paraguay
Torres Garcés 64' (pen.)	Report	Talavera 22'; Solalinde 77'

Estadio Olímpico Atahualpa, Quito
Attendance: 45,000
Referee: Carlos Espósito (Argentina)

5 September 1979

Ecuador	2–1	Uruguay
Tenorio 6'; Alarcón 9'	Report	Victorino 79' (pen.); Castillo (red card) 65'

Estadio Olímpico Atahualpa, Quito
Attendance: 30,000
Referee: Romualdo Arppi Filho (Brazil)

13 September 1979

Paraguay	2–0	Ecuador
E. Morel 27'; Osorio 48'	Report

Defensores del Chaco, Asunción
Attendance: 25,000
Referee: Abel Gnecco (Argentina)

16 September 1979

Uruguay	2–1	Ecuador
Bica 4'; Victorino 57' (pen.); Maneiro (red card) 78'	Report	Klinger 77'; Granda (red card) 57'; Ron (red card) 81'

Estadio Centenario, Montevideo
Attendance: 25,000
Referee: Oscar Scolfaro (Brazil)

20 September 1979

Paraguay	0–0	Uruguay
Ovelar (red card) 35'	Report

Defensores del Chaco, Asunción
Attendance: 25,000
Referee: Sergio Vásquez Sánchez (Chile)

26 September 1979

Uruguay	2–2	Paraguay
Milar 54' (pen.); Paz 83'	Report	E. Morel 34', 88'

Estadio Centenario, Montevideo
Attendance: 18,000
Referee: Edison Pérez (Peru)

== Knockout stage ==
Semi-finals
Paraguay	2	2
Brazil	1	2
Peru	1	0
Chile	2	0

Finals
Paraguay (agg.)	3	0	0
Chile	0	1	0

=== Semi-finals ===
17 October 1979

Peru	1–2	Chile
Mosquera 71'		Caszely 36', 76'

Estadio Nacional, Lima
Attendance: 50,000
Referee: Romualdo Arppi Filho (Brazil)
24 October 1979

Chile	0–0	Peru

Estadio Nacional, Santiago
Attendance: 75,000
Referee: Juan Daniel Cardellino (Uruguay)

Chile won 3–1 on points.

24 October 1979

Paraguay	2–1	Brazil
E. Morel 16'; Talavera 35'	Report	Palhinha 79'

Defensores del Chaco, Asunción
Attendance: 50,000
Referee: Ramón Barreto (Uruguay)
31 October 1979

Brazil	2–2	Paraguay
Falcão 29'; Sócrates 61' (pen.)	Report	M. Morel 31'; Romerito 68'

Maracaná, Rio de Janeiro
Attendance: 80,000
Referee: Carlos Espósito (Argentina)

Paraguay won 3–1 on points.

=== Finals ===
28 November 1979

Paraguay	3–0	Chile
Romerito 12', 85'; M. Morel 36'

Defensores del Chaco, Asunción
Attendance: 40,000
Referee: Luis Gregorio da Rosa (Uruguay)
5 December 1979

Chile	1–0	Paraguay
Rivas 10'

Estadio Nacional, Santiago
Attendance: 55,000
Referee: Ramón Barreto (Uruguay)

As the teams were tied 2–2 on points, a play-off on a neutral ground was required to determine the winner.

11 December 1979

Paraguay	0–0 (a.e.t.)	Chile

José Amalfitani, Buenos Aires, Argentina
Attendance: 32,000
Referee: Arnaldo Cézar Coelho (Brazil)

The play-off match finished tied after extra time expired, meaning the teams finished 3–3 on points. Paraguay won on aggregate 3–1.

== Goalscorers ==
With four goals, Jorge Peredo and Eugenio Morel are the top scorer in the tournament. In total, 63 goals were scored by 41 different players, with none of them credited as own goal.

4 goals

- (Chile) Jorge Peredo
- (Paraguay) Eugenio Morel

3 goals

- (Brazil) Sócrates
- (Chile) Carlos Caszely
- (Chile) Carlos Rivas
- (Paraguay) Romerito

2 goals

- (Argentina) Daniel Passarella
- (Bolivia) Carlos Aragonés
- (Bolivia) Jesús Reynaldo
- (Brazil) Tita
- (Brazil) Zico
- (Paraguay) Milcíades Morel
- (Paraguay) Hugo Talavera
- (Uruguay) Waldemar Victorino

1 goal

- (Argentina) Hugo Coscia
- (Argentina) Roberto Díaz
- (Argentina) Jorge Gáspari
- (Argentina) Carlos Angel López
- (Argentina) Diego Maradona
- (Brazil) Paulo Roberto Falcão
- (Brazil) Palhinha
- (Brazil) Roberto Dinamite
- (Chile) Mario Soto
- (Chile) Leonardo Véliz
- (Chile) Patricio Yáñez
- (Colombia) José Chaparro
- (Colombia) Ernesto Díaz
- (Colombia) Arnoldo Iguarán
- (Colombia) Jaime Morón
- (Colombia) César Valverde
- (Ecuador) Jorge Luis Alarcón
- (Ecuador) Fausto Klinger
- (Ecuador) Mario Tenorio
- (Ecuador) Carlos Torres Garcés
- (Paraguay) Juvencio Osorio
- (Paraguay) Alicio Solalinde
- (Peru) Roberto Mosquera
- (Uruguay) Alberto Bica
- (Uruguay) Denis Milar
- (Uruguay) Rubén Paz
- (Venezuela) Rodolfo Carbajal
