= Brazil national football team results (1970–1989) =

This page details the match results and statistics of the Brazil national football team from 1970 to 1989.

== Key ==
Key to matches

- Att.=Match attendance
- (H)=Home ground
- (A)=Away ground
- (N)=Neutral ground

Key to record by opponent

- Pld=Games played
- W=Games won
- D=Games drawn
- L=Games lost
- GF=Goals for
- GA=Goals against

== Results ==
Brazil's score is shown first in each case.

No.	Date	Venue	Opponents	Score	Competition	Brazil scorers	Att.	Ref.
312	4 March 1970	Estádio Beira-Rio, Porto Alegre (H)	Argentina	0–2	Friendly		100,000	
313	8 March 1970	Maracanã Stadium, Rio de Janeiro (H)	Argentina	2–1	Friendly	Jairzinho, Pelé	100,000	
314	22 March 1970	Estádio do Morumbi, São Paulo (H)	Chile	5–0	Friendly	Roberto Miranda (2), Gérson, Pelé (2)	100,000	
315	26 March 1970	Maracanã Stadium, Rio de Janeiro (H)	Chile	2–1	Friendly	Carlos Alberto, Rivellino	110,000	
316	12 April 1970	Maracanã Stadium, Rio de Janeiro (H)	Paraguay	0–0	Friendly		72,000	
317	29 April 1970	Maracanã Stadium, Rio de Janeiro (H)	Austria	1–0	Friendly	Rivellino	57,000	
318	3 June 1970	Estadio Jalisco, Guadalajara (N)	Czechoslovakia	4–1	1970 FIFA World Cup	Rivellino, Pelé, Jairzinho (2)	52,897	
319	7 June 1970	Estadio Jalisco, Guadalajara (N)	England	1–0	1970 FIFA World Cup	Jairzinho	66,843	
320	10 June 1970	Estadio Jalisco, Guadalajara (N)	Romania	3–2	1970 FIFA World Cup	Pelé (2), Jairzinho	50,804	
321	14 June 1970	Estadio Jalisco, Guadalajara (N)	Peru	4–2	1970 FIFA World Cup	Rivellino, Tostão (2), Jairzinho	54,233	
322	17 June 1970	Estadio Jalisco, Guadalajara (N)	Uruguay	3–1	1970 FIFA World Cup	Clodoaldo, Jairzinho, Rivellino	51,261	
323	21 June 1970	Estadio Azteca, Mexico City (N)	Italy	4–1	1970 FIFA World Cup	Pelé, Gérson, Jairzinho, Carlos Alberto	107,412	
324	30 September 1970	Maracanã Stadium, Rio de Janeiro (H)	Mexico	2–1	Copa Emílio Garrastazu Médici	Jairzinho, Tostão	155,000	
325	4 October 1970	Estadio Nacional, Santiago (A)	Chile	5–1	Friendly	Pelé, Roberto Miranda, Jairzinho (2), Caju	75,000	
326	11 July 1971	Estádio do Morumbi, São Paulo (H)	Austria	1–1	Friendly	Pelé	125,000	
327	14 July 1971	Maracanã Stadium, Rio de Janeiro (H)	Czechoslovakia	1–0	Friendly	Tostão	42,000	
328	18 July 1971	Maracanã Stadium, Rio de Janeiro (H)	Yugoslavia	2–2	Friendly	Rivellino, Gérson	138,575	
329	21 July 1971	Maracanã Stadium, Rio de Janeiro (H)	Hungary	0–0	Friendly		90,000	
330	24 July 1971	Maracanã Stadium, Rio de Janeiro (H)	Paraguay	1–0	Friendly	Claudiomiro	40,000	
331	28 July 1971	Estadio Monumental, Buenos Aires (A)	Argentina	1–1	Copa Julio Argentino Roca	Caju	—	
332	31 July 1971	Estadio Monumental, Buenos Aires (A)	Argentina	2–2 (a.e.t.)	Copa Julio Argentino Roca	Tostão, Caju	—	
333	26 April 1972	Estádio Beira-Rio, Porto Alegre (H)	Paraguay	3–2	Friendly	Carlos Alberto, Tostão, Dirceu Lopes	—	
334	28 June 1972	Maracanã Stadium, Rio de Janeiro (N)	Czechoslovakia	0–0	Brazil Independence Cup		115,000	
335	2 July 1972	Estádio do Morumbi, São Paulo (N)	Yugoslavia	3–0	Brazil Independence Cup	Leivinha (2), Jairzinho	100,000	
336	5 July 1972	Maracanã Stadium, Rio de Janeiro (N)	Scotland	1–0	Brazil Independence Cup	Jairzinho	130,000	
337	9 July 1972	Maracanã Stadium, Rio de Janeiro (N)	Portugal	1–0	Brazil Independence Cup	Jairzinho	—	
338	27 May 1973	Maracanã Stadium, Rio de Janeiro (H)	Bolivia	5–0	Friendly	Rivellino (2), Valdomiro, Leivinha (2)	—	
339	3 June 1973	Stade du 5 Juillet, Algiers (A)	Algeria	2–0	Friendly	Rivellino, Caju	—	
340	6 June 1973	Stade El Menzah, Tunis (A)	Tunisia	4–1	Friendly	Caju (2), Valdomiro, Leivinha	35,000	
341	9 June 1973	Stadio Olimpico, Rome (A)	Italy	0–2	Friendly		75,000	
342	13 June 1973	Praterstadion, Vienna (A)	Austria	1–1	Friendly	Jairzinho	—	
343	16 June 1973	Olympiastadion, West Berlin (A)	West Germany	1–0	Friendly	Dirceu	—	
344	21 June 1973	Central Lenin Stadium, Moscow (A)	Soviet Union	1–0	Friendly	Jairzinho	80,000	
345	25 June 1973	Råsunda Stadium, Solna (A)	Sweden	0–1	Friendly		39,664	
346	30 June 1973	Hampden Park, Glasgow (A)	Scotland	1–0	Friendly	Johnstone (o.g.)	70,000	
347	31 March 1974	Maracanã Stadium, Rio de Janeiro (H)	Mexico	1–1	Friendly	Jairzinho	85,000	
348	7 April 1974	Maracanã Stadium, Rio de Janeiro (H)	Czechoslovakia	1–0	Friendly	Marinho Chagas	80,000	
349	14 April 1974	Maracanã Stadium, Rio de Janeiro (H)	Bulgaria	1–0	Friendly	Jairzinho	73,000	
350	17 April 1974	Estádio do Morumbi, São Paulo (H)	Romania	2–0	Friendly	Leivinha, Edu	70,000	
351	21 April 1974	Estádio Hélio Prates da Silveira, Brasília (H)	Haiti	4–0	Friendly	Caju, Rivellino, Marinho Chagas, Edu	35,000	
352	28 April 1974	Maracanã Stadium, Rio de Janeiro (H)	Greece	0–0	Friendly		100,000	
353	1 May 1974	Estádio do Morumbi, São Paulo (H)	Austria	0–0	Friendly		123,132	
354	5 May 1974	Maracanã Stadium, Rio de Janeiro (H)	Republic of Ireland	2–1	Friendly	Leivinha, Rivellino	74,696	
355	12 May 1974	Maracanã Stadium, Rio de Janeiro (H)	Paraguay	2–0	Friendly	Marinho Peres, Rivellino	—	
356	13 June 1974	Waldstadion, Frankfurt (N)	Yugoslavia	0–0	1974 FIFA World Cup		62,000	
357	18 June 1974	Waldstadion, Frankfurt (N)	Scotland	0–0	1974 FIFA World Cup		62,000	
358	22 June 1974	Parkstadion, Gelsenkirchen (N)	Zaire	3–0	1974 FIFA World Cup	Jairzinho, Rivellino, Valdomiro	36,200	
359	26 June 1974	Niedersachsenstadion, Hanover (N)	East Germany	1–0	1974 FIFA World Cup	Rivellino	59,863	
360	30 June 1974	Niedersachsenstadion, Hanover (N)	Argentina	2–1	1974 FIFA World Cup	Rivellino, Jairzinho	39,400	
361	3 July 1974	Westfalenstadion, Dortmund (N)	Netherlands	0–2	1974 FIFA World Cup		53,700	
362	6 July 1974	Olympiastadion, Munich (N)	Poland	0–1	1974 FIFA World Cup		77,100	
363	30 July 1975	Estadio Olímpico, Caracas (A)	Venezuela	4–0	1975 Copa América	Romeu, Danival, Palhinha (2)	20,000	
364	6 August 1975	Mineirão, Belo Horizonte (H)	Argentina	2–1	1975 Copa América	Nelinho (2)	80,000	
365	13 August 1975	Mineirão, Belo Horizonte (H)	Venezuela	6–0	1975 Copa América	Roberto Batata (2), Nelinho, Danival, Campos, Palhinha	32,000	
366	16 August 1975	Estadio Gigante de Arroyito, Rosario (A)	Argentina	1–0	1975 Copa América	Danival	50,000	
367	30 September 1975	Mineirão, Belo Horizonte (H)	Peru	1–3	1975 Copa América	Roberto Batata	25,000	
368	4 October 1975	Estadio Alianza Lima, Lima (A)	Peru	2–0	1975 Copa América	Meléndez (o.g.), Campos	55,000	
369	25 February 1976	Estadio Centenario, Montevideo (A)	Uruguay	2–1	Taça do Atlântico	Nelinho, Zico	50,000	
370	27 February 1976	Estadio Monumental, Buenos Aires (A)	Argentina	2–1	Taça do Atlântico	Lula, Zico	—	
371	7 April 1976	Estadio Defensores del Chaco, Asunción (A)	Paraguay	1–1	Taça do Atlântico	Enéas	—	
372	28 April 1976	Maracanã Stadium, Rio de Janeiro (H)	Uruguay	2–1	Taça do Atlântico	Rivellino, Zico	—	
373	19 May 1976	Maracanã Stadium, Rio de Janeiro (H)	Argentina	2–0	Taça do Atlântico	Lula, Neca	—	
374	23 May 1976	Los Angeles Memorial Coliseum, Los Angeles (N)	England	1–0	US Bicentennial Cup	Roberto Dinamite	32,900	
375	31 May 1976	Yale Bowl, New Haven (N)	Italy	4–1	US Bicentennial Cup	Gil (2), Zico, Roberto Dinamite	36,096	
376	4 June 1976	Estadio Jalisco, Guadalajara (A)	Mexico	3–0	Friendly	Roberto Dinamite (2), Gil	75,000	
377	9 June 1976	Maracanã Stadium, Rio de Janeiro (H)	Paraguay	3–1	Taça do Atlântico	Roberto Dinamite (2), Zico	28,820	
378	1 December 1976	Maracanã Stadium, Rio de Janeiro (H)	Soviet Union	2–0	Friendly	Falcão, Zico	50,000	
379	30 January 1977	Estádio do Morumbi, São Paulo (H)	Bulgaria	1–0	Friendly	Roberto Dinamite	67,708	
380	20 February 1977	Estadio El Campín, Bogotá (A)	Colombia	0–0	1978 FIFA World Cup qualification		55,439	
381	9 March 1977	Maracanã Stadium, Rio de Janeiro (H)	Colombia	6–0	1978 FIFA World Cup qualification	Roberto Dinamite (2), Zico, Marinho Chagas (2), Rivellino	132,764	
382	13 March 1977	Estadio Defensores del Chaco, Asunción (A)	Paraguay	1–0	1978 FIFA World Cup qualification	Insfrán (o.g.)	40,490	
383	20 March 1977	Maracanã Stadium, Rio de Janeiro (H)	Paraguay	1–1	1978 FIFA World Cup qualification	Roberto Dinamite	94,947	
384	8 June 1977	Maracanã Stadium, Rio de Janeiro (H)	England	0–0	Friendly		77,000	
385	12 June 1977	Maracanã Stadium, Rio de Janeiro (H)	West Germany	1–1	Friendly	Rivellino	106,000	
386	19 June 1977	Estádio do Morumbi, São Paulo (H)	Poland	3–1	Friendly	Paulo Isidoro, Reinaldo, Rivellino	100,000	
387	23 June 1977	Maracanã Stadium, Rio de Janeiro (H)	Scotland	2–0	Friendly	Zico, Toninho Cerezo	60,763	
388	26 June 1977	Mineirão, Belo Horizonte (H)	Yugoslavia	0–0	Friendly		91,140	
389	30 June 1977	Maracanã Stadium, Rio de Janeiro (H)	France	2–2	Friendly	Edinho, Roberto Dinamite	85,317	
390	10 July 1977	Estadio Olímpico Pascual Guerrero, Cali (N)	Peru	1–0	1978 FIFA World Cup qualification	Gil	50,345	
391	14 July 1977	Estadio Olímpico Pascual Guerrero, Cali (N)	Bolivia	8–0	1978 FIFA World Cup qualification	Zico (4), Roberto Dinamite, Gil, Toninho Cerezo, Marcelo	38,037	
392	1 April 1978	Parc des Princes, Paris (A)	France	0–1	Friendly		46,065	
393	5 April 1978	Volksparkstadion, Hamburg (A)	West Germany	1–0	Friendly	Nunes	61,500	
394	19 April 1978	Wembley Stadium, London (A)	England	1–1	Friendly	Gil	92,500	
395	1 May 1978	Maracanã Stadium, Rio de Janeiro (H)	Peru	3–0	Friendly	Zico, Reinaldo (2)	142,500	
396	17 May 1978	Maracanã Stadium, Rio de Janeiro (H)	Czechoslovakia	2–0	Friendly	Reinaldo, Zico	45,000	
397	3 June 1978	Estadio José María Minella, Mar del Plata (N)	Sweden	1–1	1978 FIFA World Cup	Reinaldo	32,569	
398	7 June 1978	Estadio José María Minella, Mar del Plata (N)	Spain	0–0	1978 FIFA World Cup		34,771	
399	11 June 1978	Estadio José María Minella, Mar del Plata (N)	Austria	1–0	1978 FIFA World Cup	Roberto Dinamite	35,221	
400	14 June 1978	Estadio Malvinas Argentinas, Mendoza (N)	Peru	3–0	1978 FIFA World Cup	Dirceu (2), Zico	31,278	
401	18 June 1978	Estadio Gigante de Arroyito, Rosario (N)	Argentina	0–0	1978 FIFA World Cup		37,326	
402	21 June 1978	Estadio Malvinas Argentinas, Mendoza (N)	Poland	3–1	1978 FIFA World Cup	Nelinho, Roberto Dinamite (2)	39,586	
403	24 June 1978	Estadio Monumental, Buenos Aires (N)	Italy	2–1	1978 FIFA World Cup	Nelinho, Dirceu	69,659	
404	17 May 1979	Maracanã Stadium, Rio de Janeiro (H)	Paraguay	6–0	Friendly	Éder, Zico (3), Nílton Batata (2)	70,627	
405	31 May 1979	Maracanã Stadium, Rio de Janeiro (H)	Uruguay	5–1	Friendly	Edinho, Sócrates (2), Nílton Batata, Éder	—	
406	26 July 1979	Estadio Hernando Siles, La Paz (A)	Bolivia	1–2	1979 Copa América	Roberto Dinamite	40,000	
407	2 August 1979	Maracanã Stadium, Rio de Janeiro (H)	Argentina	2–1	1979 Copa América	Zico, Tita	130,000	
408	16 August 1979	Estádio do Morumbi, São Paulo (H)	Bolivia	2–0	1979 Copa América	Tita, Zico	50,000	
409	23 August 1979	Estadio Monumental, Buenos Aires (A)	Argentina	2–2	1979 Copa América	Sócrates (2)	68,000	
410	24 October 1979	Estadio Defensores del Chaco, Asunción (A)	Paraguay	1–2	1979 Copa América	Palhinha	50,000	
411	31 October 1979	Maracanã Stadium, Rio de Janeiro (H)	Paraguay	2–2	1979 Copa América	Falcão, Sócrates	80,000	
412	8 June 1980	Maracanã Stadium, Rio de Janeiro (H)	Mexico	2–0	Friendly	Zé Sérgio, Serginho	34,316	
413	15 June 1980	Maracanã Stadium, Rio de Janeiro (H)	Soviet Union	1–2	Friendly	Nunes	61,526	
414	24 June 1980	Mineirão, Belo Horizonte (H)	Chile	2–1	Friendly	Zico, Toninho Cerezo	26,111	
415	29 June 1980	Estádio do Morumbi, São Paulo (H)	Poland	1–1	Friendly	Zico	—	
416	27 August 1980	Castelão, Fortaleza (H)	Uruguay	1–0	Friendly	Getúlio	118,496	
417	25 September 1980	Estadio Defensores del Chaco, Asunción (A)	Paraguay	2–1	Friendly	Zé Sérgio, Reinaldo	25,000	
418	30 October 1980	Estádio Serra Dourada, Goiânia (H)	Paraguay	6–0	Friendly	Zé Sérgio, Tita, Zico (2), Sócrates, Luizinho	59,050	
419	21 December 1980	Verdão, Cuiabá (H)	Switzerland	2–0	Friendly	Sócrates, Zé Sérgio	43,452	
420	4 January 1981	Estadio Centenario, Montevideo (N)	Argentina	1–1	1980 Mundialito	Edevaldo	60,000	
421	7 January 1981	Estadio Centenario, Montevideo (N)	West Germany	4–1	1980 Mundialito	Júnior, Toninho Cerezo, Serginho, Zé Sérgio	50,000	
422	10 January 1981	Estadio Centenario, Montevideo (N)	Uruguay	1–2	1980 Mundialito	Sócrates	75,000	
423	1 February 1981	Estadio El Campín, Bogotá (A)	Colombia	1–1	Friendly	Serginho	55,000	
424	8 February 1981	Estadio Olímpico, Caracas (A)	Venezuela	1–0	1982 FIFA World Cup qualification	Zico	30,000	
425	14 February 1981	Estadio Olímpico Atahualpa, Quito (A)	Ecuador	6–0	Friendly	Reinaldo (2), Sócrates (2), Landeta (o.g.), Zico	30,000	
426	22 February 1981	Estadio Hernando Siles, La Paz (A)	Bolivia	2–1	1982 FIFA World Cup qualification	Sócrates, Reinaldo	50,000	
427	14 March 1981	Estádio Santa Cruz, Ribeirão Preto (H)	Chile	2–1	Friendly	Zico, Reinaldo	56,000	
428	22 March 1981	Maracanã Stadium, Rio de Janeiro (H)	Bolivia	3–1	1982 FIFA World Cup qualification	Zico (3)	121,750	
429	29 March 1981	Estádio Serra Dourada, Goiânia (H)	Venezuela	5–0	1982 FIFA World Cup qualification	Tita (2), Sócrates, Zico, Júnior	34,229	
430	12 May 1981	Wembley Stadium, London (A)	England	1–0	Friendly	Zico	75,000	
431	15 May 1981	Parc des Princes, Paris (A)	France	3–1	Friendly	Zico, Reinaldo, Sócrates	47,749	
432	19 May 1981	Neckarstadion, Stuttgart (A)	West Germany	2–1	Friendly	Toninho Cerezo, Júnior	71,000	
433	8 July 1981	Estádio Fonte Nova, Salvador (H)	Spain	1–0	Friendly	Baltazar	74,089	
434	26 August 1981	Estadio Nacional, Santiago (A)	Chile	0–0	Friendly		32,278	
435	28 October 1981	Estádio Olímpico Monumental, Porto Alegre (H)	Bulgaria	3–0	Friendly	Roberto Dinamite, Zico, Leandro	23,928	
436	26 January 1982	Castelão, Natal (H)	East Germany	3–1	Friendly	Paulo Isidoro, Renato, Serginho	48,638	
437	3 March 1982	Estádio do Morumbi, São Paulo (H)	Czechoslovakia	1–1	Friendly	Zico	107,060	
438	21 March 1982	Maracanã Stadium, Rio de Janeiro (H)	West Germany	1–0	Friendly	Júnior	150,289	
439	5 May 1982	Castelão, São Luís (H)	Portugal	3–1	Friendly	Júnior, Éder, Zico	71,560	
440	19 May 1982	Estádio do Arruda, Recife (H)	Switzerland	1–1	Friendly	Zico	59,732	
441	27 May 1982	Estádio Parque do Sabiá, Uberlândia (H)	Republic of Ireland	7–0	Friendly	Falcão, Sócrates (2), Serginho (2), Luizinho, Zico	72,733	
442	14 June 1982	Ramón Sánchez Pizjuán Stadium, Seville (N)	Soviet Union	2–1	1982 FIFA World Cup	Sócrates, Éder	68,000	
443	18 June 1982	Estadio Benito Villamarín, Seville (N)	Scotland	4–1	1982 FIFA World Cup	Zico, Oscar, Éder, Falcão	47,379	
444	23 June 1982	Estadio Benito Villamarín, Seville (N)	New Zealand	4–0	1982 FIFA World Cup	Zico (2), Falcão, Sócrates	43,000	
445	2 July 1982	Sarrià Stadium, Barcelona (N)	Argentina	3–1	1982 FIFA World Cup	Zico, Serginho, Júnior	44,000	
446	5 July 1982	Sarrià Stadium, Barcelona (N)	Italy	2–3	1982 FIFA World Cup	Sócrates, Falcão	44,000	
447	28 April 1983	Maracanã Stadium, Rio de Janeiro (H)	Chile	3–2	Friendly	Careca, Éder, Renato	53,468	
448	8 June 1983	Estádio Municipal de Coimbra, Coimbra (A)	Portugal	4–0	Friendly	Careca (2), Sócrates, Pedrinho	10,000	
449	12 June 1983	Ninian Park, Cardiff (A)	Wales	1–1	Friendly	Paulo Isidoro	35,000	
450	17 June 1983	St. Jakob Stadium, Basel (A)	Switzerland	2–1	Friendly	Sócrates, Careca	58,000	
451	22 June 1983	Ullevi, Gothenburg (A)	Sweden	3–3	Friendly	Márcio Rossini, Careca, Jorginho Putinatti	40,820	
452	28 July 1983	Estadio Nacional, Santiago (A)	Chile	0–0	Friendly		20,000	
453	17 August 1983	Estadio Olímpico Atahualpa, Quito (A)	Ecuador	1–0	1983 Copa América	Roberto Dinamite	50,000	
454	24 August 1983	Estadio Monumental, Buenos Aires (A)	Argentina	0–1	1983 Copa América		70,000	
455	1 September 1983	Estádio Serra Dourada, Goiânia (H)	Ecuador	5–0	1983 Copa América	Renato Gaúcho, Roberto Dinamite (2), Éder, Tita	35,000	
456	14 September 1983	Maracanã Stadium, Rio de Janeiro (H)	Argentina	0–0	1983 Copa América		75,000	
457	13 October 1983	Estadio Defensores del Chaco, Asunción (A)	Paraguay	1–1	1983 Copa América	Éder	55,000	
458	20 October 1983	Estádio Parque do Sabiá, Uberlândia (H)	Paraguay	0–0 (a.e.t.)	1983 Copa América		75,000	
459	27 October 1983	Estadio Centenario, Montevideo (A)	Uruguay	0–2	1983 Copa América		65,000	
460	4 November 1983	Estádio Fonte Nova, Salvador (H)	Uruguay	1–1	1983 Copa América	Jorginho Putinatti	95,000	
461	10 June 1984	Maracanã Stadium, Rio de Janeiro (H)	England	0–2	Friendly		56,126	
462	17 June 1984	Estádio do Morumbi, São Paulo (H)	Argentina	0–0	Friendly		32,000	
463	21 June 1984	Estádio Couto Pereira, Curitiba (H)	Uruguay	1–0	Friendly	Arturzinho	41,000	
464	25 April 1985	Mineirão, Belo Horizonte (H)	Colombia	2–1	Friendly	Alemão, Casagrande	49,898	
465	28 April 1985	Estádio Nacional Mané Garrincha, Brasília (H)	Peru	0–1	Friendly		65,000	
466	2 May 1985	Estádio do Arruda, Recife (H)	Uruguay	2–0	Friendly	Alemão, Careca	59,496	
467	5 May 1985	Estádio Fonte Nova, Salvador (H)	Argentina	2–1	Friendly	Careca, Alemão	77,258	
468	15 May 1985	Estadio El Campín, Bogotá (A)	Colombia	0–1	Friendly		25,000	
469	21 May 1985	Estadio Nacional, Santiago (A)	Chile	1–2	Friendly	Casagrande	25,000	
470	2 June 1985	Estadio Ramón Tahuichi Aguilera, Santa Cruz de la Sierra (A)	Bolivia	2–0	1986 FIFA World Cup qualification	Casagrande, Noro (o.g.)	25,000	
471	8 June 1985	Estádio Beira-Rio, Porto Alegre (H)	Chile	3–1	Friendly	Zico (2), Leandro	35,351	
472	16 June 1985	Estadio Defensores del Chaco, Asunción (A)	Paraguay	2–0	1986 FIFA World Cup qualification	Casagrande, Zico	55,000	
473	23 June 1985	Maracanã Stadium, Rio de Janeiro (H)	Paraguay	1–1	1986 FIFA World Cup qualification	Sócrates	139,923	
474	30 June 1985	Estádio do Morumbi, São Paulo (H)	Bolivia	1–1	1986 FIFA World Cup qualification	Careca	90,709	
475	12 March 1986	Waldstadion, Frankfurt (A)	West Germany	0–2	Friendly		50,000	
476	16 March 1986	Népstadion, Budapest (A)	Hungary	0–3	Friendly		70,000	
477	1 April 1986	Castelão, São Luís (H)	Peru	4–0	Friendly	Casagrande (2), Alemão, Careca	50,000	
478	8 April 1986	Estádio Serra Dourada, Goiânia (H)	East Germany	3–0	Friendly	Müller, Alemão, Careca	66,723	
479	17 April 1986	Estádio Nacional Mané Garrincha, Brasília (H)	Finland	3–0	Friendly	Marinho, Oscar, Casagrande	44,597	
480	30 April 1986	Estádio do Arruda, Recife (H)	Yugoslavia	4–2	Friendly	Zico (3), Careca	54,249	
481	7 May 1986	Pinheirão, Curitiba (H)	Chile	1–1	Friendly	Casagrande	65,000	
482	1 June 1986	Estadio Jalisco, Guadalajara (N)	Spain	1–0	1986 FIFA World Cup	Sócrates	35,748	
483	6 June 1986	Estadio Jalisco, Guadalajara (N)	Algeria	1–0	1986 FIFA World Cup	Careca	48,000	
484	12 June 1986	Estadio Jalisco, Guadalajara (N)	Northern Ireland	3–0	1986 FIFA World Cup	Careca (2), Josimar	51,000	
485	16 June 1986	Estadio Jalisco, Guadalajara (N)	Poland	4–0	1986 FIFA World Cup	Sócrates, Josimar, Edinho, Careca	45,000	
486	21 June 1986	Estadio Jalisco, Guadalajara (N)	France	1–1 (a.e.t.) (3–4p)	1986 FIFA World Cup	Careca	65,000	
487	19 May 1987	Wembley Stadium, London (A)	England	1–1	1987 Rous Cup	Mirandinha	92,000	
488	23 May 1987	Lansdowne Road, Dublin (A)	Republic of Ireland	0–1	Friendly		30,000	
489	26 May 1987	Hampden Park, Glasgow (A)	Scotland	2–0	1987 Rous Cup	Raí, Valdo	41,384	
490	28 May 1987	Helsinki Olympic Stadium, Helsinki (A)	Finland	3–2	Friendly	Romário, Valdo, Müller	—	
491	1 June 1987	Ramat Gan Stadium, Ramat Gan (A)	Israel	4–0	Friendly	Romário (2), Dunga, João Paulo	45,000	
492	21 June 1987	Estádio da Ressacada, Florianópolis (H)	Ecuador	4–1	Friendly	Raí, Careca, Müller, Jorginho	7,039	
493	24 June 1987	Estádio Olímpico Monumental, Porto Alegre (H)	Paraguay	1–0	Friendly	Valdo	21,964	
494	28 June 1987	Estadio Chateau Carreras, Córdoba (N)	Venezuela	5–0	1987 Copa América	Edu Marangon, Morovic (o.g.), Careca, Nelsinho, Romário	8,000	
495	3 July 1987	Estadio Chateau Carreras, Córdoba (N)	Chile	0–4	1987 Copa América		15,000	
496	9 December 1987	Estádio Parque do Sabiá, Uberlândia (H)	Chile	2–1	Friendly	Valdo, Renato	14,604	
497	12 December 1987	Estádio Nacional Mané Garrincha, Brasília (H)	West Germany	1–1	Friendly	Batista	20,000	
498	7 July 1988	Olympic Park Stadium, Melbourne (N)	Australia	1–0	Australia Bicentenary Gold Cup	Romário	11,214	
499	10 July 1988	Olympic Park Stadium, Melbourne (N)	Argentina	0–0	Australia Bicentenary Gold Cup		13,850	
500	13 July 1988	Olympic Park Stadium, Melbourne (N)	Saudi Arabia	4–1	Australia Bicentenary Gold Cup	Geovani (2), Jorginho, Edmar	3,200	
501	17 July 1988	Sydney Football Stadium, Sydney (N)	Australia	2–0	Australia Bicentenary Gold Cup	Romário, Müller	28,161	
502	28 July 1988	Ullevaal Stadion, Oslo (A)	Norway	1–1	Friendly	Edmar	23,044	
503	3 August 1988	Praterstadion, Vienna (A)	Austria	2–0	Friendly	Edmar, Andrade	44,063	
504	12 October 1988	Bosuilstadion, Antwerp (A)	Belgium	2–1	Friendly	Geovani (2)	10,000	
505	15 March 1989	Verdão, Cuiabá (H)	Ecuador	1–0	Friendly	Washington	54,815	
506	12 April 1989	Albertão, Teresina (H)	Paraguay	2–0	Friendly	Cristóvão, Vivinho	59,844	
507	10 May 1989	Castelão, Fortaleza (H)	Peru	4–1	Friendly	Zé do Carmo, Bebeto, Charles (2)	72,246	
508	24 May 1989	Estadio Nacional, Lima (A)	Peru	1–1	Friendly	Cristóvão	3,000	
509	8 June 1989	Maracanã Stadium, Rio de Janeiro (H)	Portugal	4–0	Friendly	Bebeto, Sobrinho (o.g.), Ricardo Gomes, Charles	—	
510	16 June 1989	Idrætsparken, Copenhagen (N)	Sweden	1–2	DBU 100th Anniversary Tournament	Cristóvão	6,700	
511	18 June 1989	Idrætsparken, Copenhagen (N)	Denmark	0–4	DBU 100th Anniversary Tournament		38,900	
512	21 June 1989	St. Jakob Stadium, Basel (A)	Switzerland	0–1	Friendly		25,000	
513	1 July 1989	Estádio Fonte Nova, Salvador (N)	Venezuela	3–1	1989 Copa América	Bebeto, Geovani, Baltazar	35,000	
514	3 July 1989	Estádio Fonte Nova, Salvador (N)	Peru	0–0	1989 Copa América		8,200	
515	7 July 1989	Estádio Fonte Nova, Salvador (N)	Colombia	0–0	1989 Copa América		9,100	
516	9 July 1989	Estádio do Arruda, Recife (N)	Paraguay	2–0	1989 Copa América	Bebeto (2)	76,800	
517	12 July 1989	Maracanã Stadium, Rio de Janeiro (N)	Argentina	2–0	1989 Copa América	Bebeto, Romário	110,000	
518	14 July 1989	Maracanã Stadium, Rio de Janeiro (N)	Paraguay	3–0	1989 Copa América	Bebeto (2), Romário	64,500	
519	16 July 1989	Maracanã Stadium, Rio de Janeiro (N)	Uruguay	1–0	1989 Copa América	Romário	170,000	
520	23 July 1989	Estádio São Januário, Rio de Janeiro (H)	Japan	1–0	Friendly	Bismark	2,174	
521	30 July 1989	Brígido Iriarte Stadium, Caracas (A)	Venezuela	4–0	1990 FIFA World Cup qualification	Branco, Romário, Bebeto (2)	20,000	
522	13 August 1989	Estadio Nacional, Santiago (A)	Chile	1–1	1990 FIFA World Cup qualification	González (o.g.)	80,000	
523	20 August 1989	Estádio do Morumbi, São Paulo (H)	Venezuela	6–0	1990 FIFA World Cup qualification	Careca (4), Silas, Acosta (o.g.)	106,462	
524	3 September 1989	Maracanã Stadium, Rio de Janeiro (H)	Chile	2–0 w/o	1990 FIFA World Cup qualification	Careca	131,156	
525	14 October 1989	Stadio Renato Dall'Ara, Bologna (A)	Italy	1–0	Friendly	André Cruz	33,800	
526	14 November 1989	Almeidão, João Pessoa (H)	Yugoslavia	0–0	Friendly		27,604	
527	20 December 1989	De Kuip, Rotterdam (A)	Netherlands	1–0	Friendly	Careca	20,000	

Notes

1. A: Matches against Uruguay during the 1976 Taça do Atlântico doubled as the 1976 Copa Río Branco.
2. B: Matches against Argentina during the 1976 Taça do Atlântico doubled as the 1976 Copa Julio Argentino Roca.
3. C: Matches against Paraguay during the 1976 Taça do Atlântico doubled as the 1976 Taça Oswaldo Cruz.
4. D: Brazil's match against Chile during qualification for the 1990 FIFA World Cup was abandoned after 67 minutes due to misconduct from the Chilean players with the score at 1–0. Brazil were subsequently awarded a technical 2–0 victory and Chile were banned from qualifying for the 1994 FIFA World Cup.

== Record by opponent ==
Team	Pld	W	D	L	GF	GA	GD	WPCT
Algeria	2	2	0	0	3	0	+3	100.00
Argentina	20	10	8	2	26	16	+10	50.00
Australia	2	2	0	0	3	0	+3	100.00
Austria	6	3	3	0	6	2	+4	50.00
Belgium	1	1	0	0	2	1	+1	100.00
Bolivia	8	6	1	1	24	5	+19	75.00
Bulgaria	3	3	0	0	5	0	+5	100.00
Chile	15	9	4	2	29	16	+13	60.00
Colombia	6	2	3	1	9	3	+6	33.33
Czechoslovakia	6	4	2	0	9	2	+7	66.67
Denmark	1	0	0	1	0	4	−4	0.00
East Germany	3	3	0	0	7	1	+6	100.00
Ecuador	5	5	0	0	17	1	+16	100.00
England	7	3	3	1	5	4	+1	42.86
Finland	2	2	0	0	6	2	+4	100.00
France	4	1	2	1	6	5	+1	25.00
Greece	1	0	1	0	0	0	0	0.00
Haiti	1	1	0	0	4	0	+4	100.00
Hungary	2	0	1	1	0	3	−3	0.00
Israel	1	1	0	0	4	0	+4	100.00
Italy	6	4	0	2	13	8	+5	66.67
Japan	1	1	0	0	1	0	+1	100.00
Mexico	4	3	1	0	8	2	+6	75.00
Netherlands	2	1	0	1	1	2	−1	50.00
New Zealand	1	1	0	0	4	0	+4	100.00
Northern Ireland	1	1	0	0	3	0	+3	100.00
Norway	1	0	1	0	1	1	0	0.00
Paraguay	21	13	7	1	41	12	+29	61.90
Peru	11	7	2	2	23	8	+15	63.64
Poland	5	3	1	1	11	4	+7	60.00
Portugal	4	4	0	0	12	1	+11	100.00
Republic of Ireland	3	2	0	1	9	2	+7	66.67
Romania	2	2	0	0	5	2	+3	100.00
Saudi Arabia	1	1	0	0	4	1	+3	100.00
Scotland	6	5	1	0	10	1	+9	83.33
Soviet Union	4	3	0	1	6	3	+3	75.00
Spain	3	2	1	0	2	0	+2	66.67
Sweden	4	0	2	2	5	7	−2	0.00
Switzerland	4	2	1	1	5	3	+2	50.00
Tunisia	1	1	0	0	4	1	+3	100.00
Uruguay	11	8	1	2	19	9	+10	72.73
Venezuela	8	8	0	0	34	1	+33	100.00
Wales	1	0	1	0	1	1	0	0.00
West Germany	8	5	2	1	11	6	+5	62.50
Yugoslavia	6	2	4	0	9	4	+5	33.33
Zaire	1	1	0	0	3	0	+3	100.00
Total	216	138	53	25	410	144	+266	63.89

Source: Results
