= 1975 Copa América final =

- Event: 1975 Copa América
Colombia	Peru
- 2–2 on points Peru won after a play-off

First leg
Colombia	Peru
1	0
- Date: 16 October 1975
- Venue: El Campín, Bogotá
- Referee: Miguel Comesaña (Argentina)
- Attendance: 50,000

Second leg
Peru	Colombia
2	0
- Date: 22 October 1975
- Venue: Estadio Nacional, Lima
- Referee: Juan Silvagno (Chile)
- Attendance: 50,000

Play-off
Peru	Colombia
1	0
- Date: 28 October 1975
- Venue: Estadio Olímpico, Caracas
- Referee: Ramón Barreto (Uruguay)
- Attendance: 30,000

The 1975 Copa América final was the final match to determine the Copa América champion. It was the first final round in Copa América history, as the previous editions of the tournament were determined through round-robin. The first leg was held in Estadio El Campín of Bogotá on October 16, the second leg in Estadio Nacional of Lima on October 22, and the playoff match in Estadio Olímpico of Caracas on 28 October.

The final was played in a two-legged tie system, the team earning more points would be the champion. A tie on points was resolved in a play-off match to be played at a neutral venue. It happened when Peru and Colombia each won a match. Peru would defeat Colombia, 1–0. It was their second title. Hugo Sotil of FC Barcelona scored the goal.

== Qualified teams ==
Team	Previous final app.
Peru	(None) (Note: Peru had won the competition in 1939 but the winner had been decided by points.)
Colombia	(None)

== Venues ==
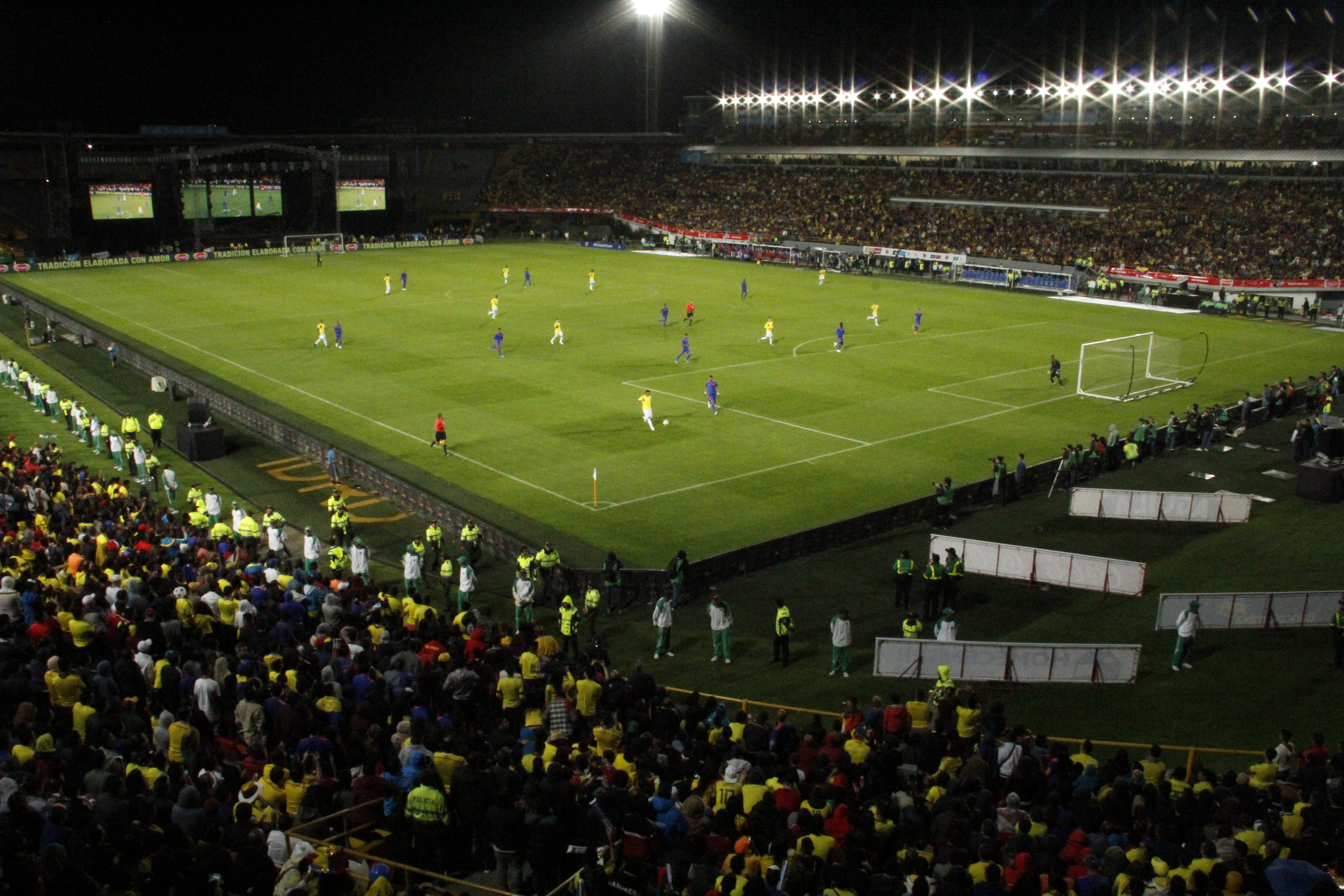
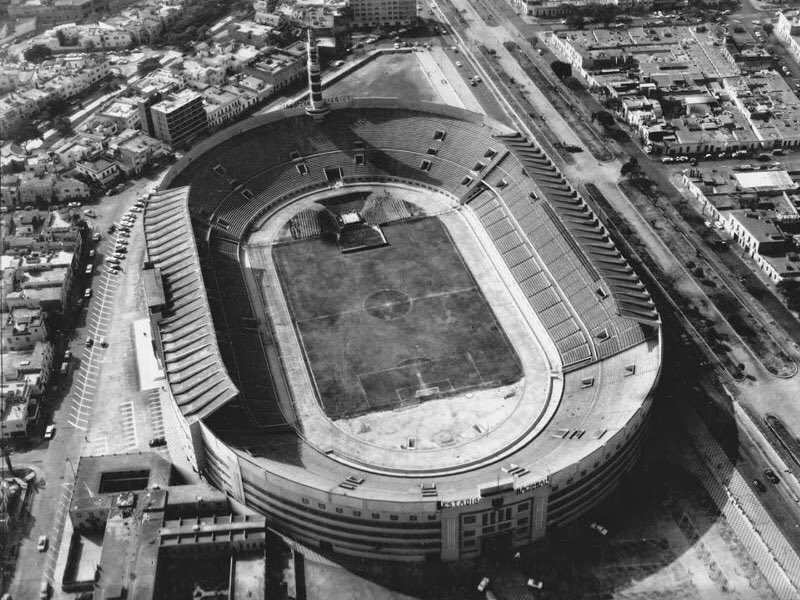
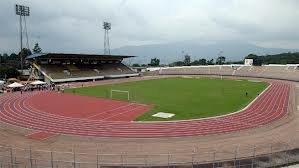
Estadio El Campín (Bogotá), Estadio Nacional (Lima) and Estadio Olímpico (Caracas), venues for the finals

== Route to the final ==
Peru
Round
Colombia
Opponent
Result
Group stage
Opponent
Result
Chile
1–1
Match 1
Paraguay
1–0

Bolivia
1–0
Match 2
Ecuador
3–1

Bolivia
3–1
Match 3
Paraguay
1–0

Chile
3–1
Match 4
Ecuador
2–0

Team	Pld	W	D	L	GF	GA	GD	Pts
Peru	4	3	1	0	8	3	+5	7
Chile	4	1	1	2	7	6	+1	3
Bolivia	4	1	0	3	3	9	−6	2

Final standings

Team	Pld	W	D	L	GF	GA	GD	Pts
Colombia	4	4	0	0	7	1	+6	8
Paraguay	4	1	1	2	5	5	0	3
Ecuador	4	0	1	3	4	10	−6	1

Opponent
Result
Knockout stage
Opponent
Result
Brazil
3–1
Semi-finals
Uruguay
3–0
Brazil
0–2
Semi-finals
Uruguay
0–1

Notes

- Peru and Brazil tied 3–3 on aggregate but Peru qualified by the drawing of lots.
- Colombia won 3–1 on aggregate

== Match details ==
=== First leg ===
1975 Copa América Finals
October 16, 1975
First leg

Colombia	1–0	Peru
Castro 38'

Estadio El Campín, Bogotá
Attendance: 50,000
Referee: Miguel Comesaña (Argentina)

Colombia	Peru

GK	Pedro Zape
RB	Arturo Segovia
CB	José Zárate
CB	Miguel A. Escobar
LB	Óscar Bolaño
RM	Diego Umaña
CM	Oswaldo Calero
CM	Eduardo Retat
LM	Carlos Rendón	(substituted off) 72'
CF	Hugo Lóndero
CF	Ponciano Castro
Substitutions:
FW	Ernesto Díaz	(substituted on) 72'
Manager:
Efraín Sánchez

GK	Ottorino Sartor
RB	Eleazar Soria
CB	Julio Meléndez
CB	Héctor Chumpitaz
LB	Rubén Díaz
CM	Alfredo Quesada
CM	Santiago Ojeda
CM	Percy Rojas
RW	Gerónimo Barbadillo
CF	Oswaldo Ramírez
LW	Juan Carlos Oblitas
Substitutions:
None
Manager:
Marcos Calderón

=== Second leg ===
October 22, 1975
Second leg

Peru	2–0	Colombia
Oblitas 18'; Ramírez 44'

Estadio Nacional, Lima
Attendance: 50,000
Referee: Juan Silvagno (Chile)

Peru	Colombia

GK	Ottorino Sartor
RB	Eleazar Soria
CB	Julio Meléndez
CB	Héctor Chumpitaz
LB	Rubén Toribio Díaz
CM	Alfredo Quesada
CM	Santiago Ojeda
CM	Percy Rojas
RW	Gerónimo Barbadillo	(substituted off) 54'
CF	Oswaldo Ramírez
LW	Juan Carlos Oblitas
Substitutions:
MF	Pedro Ruiz	(substituted on) 54'
Manager:
Marcos Calderón

GK	Pedro Zape
RB	Arturo Segovia
CB	José Zárate
CB	Miguel A. Escobar
LB	Óscar Bolaño
RM	Diego Umaña
CM	Oswaldo Calero
CM	Eduardo Retat
LM	Jairo Arboleda
CF	Hugo Lóndero
CF	Ponciano Castro
Substitutions:
None
Manager:
Efraín Sánchez

=== Play-off ===
October 28, 1975
Playoff

Peru	1–0	Colombia
Sotil 25'

Estadio Olimpico, Caracas
Attendance: 30,000
Referee: Ramón Barreto (Uruguay)

Peru	Colombia

GK	Ottorino Sartor
RB	Eleazar Soria
CB	Julio Meléndez
CB	Héctor Chumpitaz
LB	Rubén Toribio Díaz
CM	Alfredo Quesada
CM	Santiago Ojeda
CM	Percy Rojas	(substituted off) 51'
RW	Teófilo Cubillas
CF	Hugo Sotil
LW	Juan Carlos Oblitas
Substitutions:
FW	Oswaldo Ramírez	(substituted on) 51'
Manager:
Marcos Calderón

GK	Pedro Zape
RB	Arturo Segovia
CB	José Zárate
CB	Miguel A. Escobar
LB	Óscar Bolaño
RM	Willington Ortiz
CM	Diego Umaña	(substituted off) 55'
CM	Oswaldo Calero
LM	Víctor Campaz
CF	Jairo Arboleda
CF	Ernesto Díaz	(substituted off) 85'
Substitutions:
MF	Eduardo Retat	(substituted on) 55'
FW	Ponciano Castro	(substituted on) 85'
Manager:
Efraín Sánchez
