= 1975 in Brazilian football =

Football in Brazil
- Season: 1975

The following article presents a summary of the 1975 football (soccer) season in Brazil, which was the 74th season of competitive football in the country.

== Campeonato Brasileiro Série A ==
Third Stage

Teams advanced to the semifinal

Group A

Position	Team	Points	Played	Won by 2 or more goals difference	Won	Drawn	Lost	For	Against	Difference
1	Fluminense	14	7	3	2	1	1	14	5	9
2	Cruzeiro	11	7	3	0	2	2	9	5	4
3	America-RJ	10	7	1	2	3	1	8	6	2
4	Palmeiras	10	7	3	0	1	3	10	8	2
5	Corinthians	9	7	0	4	1	2	10	8	2
6	Guarani	9	7	2	1	1	3	11	9	2
7	Guarani	6	7	1	1	1	4	6	10	-4
8	Nacional	6	7	0	0	0	7	1	17	-16

Group B

Position	Team	Points	Played	Won by 2 or more goals difference	Won	Drawn	Lost	For	Against	Difference
1	Santa Cruz	14	7	3	2	1	1	14	6	8
2	Internacional	12	7	2	2	2	1	9	3	6
3	Flamengo	12	7	2	2	2	1	10	5	5
4	São Paulo	8	7	1	1	3	2	8	7	1
5	Portuguesa	8	7	1	1	3	2	8	10	-2
6	Sport	5	7	0	1	3	3	7	11	-4
7	Grêmio	5	7	0	1	3	3	5	7	-2
8	Náutico	5	7	0	0	1	6	4	16	-12

3 points for victory by a difference of two or more goals, 2 points for victory, 1 point for draw.

Semifinals

Home team	Score	Away team
Fluminense	0-2	Internacional
Santa Cruz	2-3	Cruzeiro

Final

December 14, 1975

Internacional	1–0	Cruzeiro

Beira-Rio

Internacional declared as the Campeonato Brasileiro champions.

== State championship champions ==
State	Champion	State	Champion
Acre	Juventus-AC	Pará	Remo
Alagoas	CSA	Paraíba	Botafogo-PB; Treze^{(1)}
Amapá	Amapá	Paraná	Coritiba
Amazonas	Rio Negro	Pernambuco	Sport Recife
Bahia	Bahia	Piauí	River; Tiradentes-PI^{(2)}
Ceará	Ceará	Rio de Janeiro	Americano
Distrito Federal	Campineira	Rio Grande do Norte	América-RN
Espírito Santo	Rio Branco-ES	Rio Grande do Sul	Internacional
Goiás	Goiás	Rondônia	Moto Clube
Guanabara	Fluminense	Roraima	Atlético Roraima
Maranhão	Sampaio Corrêa	Santa Catarina	Avaí
Mato Grosso	Comercial-CG	São Paulo	São Paulo
Mato Grosso do Sul	-	Sergipe	Sergipe
Minas Gerais	Cruzeiro	Tocantins	-

^{(1)}Botafogo-PB and Treze shared the Paraíba State Championship title.

^{(2)}River and Tiradentes-PI shared the Piauí State Championship title.

== Youth competition champions ==
Competition	Champion
Copa São Paulo de Juniores	Atlético Mineiro

== Other competition champions ==
Competition	Champion
Taça Minas Gerais	Atlético Mineiro
Torneio de Integração da Amazônia	Macapá

== Brazilian clubs in international competitions ==
Team	Copa Libertadores 1975
Cruzeiro	Semifinals
Vasco	Group stage

== Brazil national team ==
The following table lists all the games played by the Brazil national football team in official competitions and friendly matches during 1975.

Date	Opposition	Result	Score	Brazil scorers	Competition
July 31, 1975	Venezuela	W	4-0	Romeu, Danival, Palhinha (2)	Copa América
August 6, 1975	Argentina	W	2-1	Nelinho (2)	Copa América
August 13, 1975	Venezuela	W	6-0	Roberto Batata (2), Nelinho, Danival, Campos, Palhinha	Copa América
August 16, 1975	Argentina	W	1-0	Danival	Copa América
September 30, 1975	Peru	L	1-3	Roberto Batata	Copa América
October 4, 1975	Peru	W	2-0	Meléndez (own goal), Campos	Copa América
