= 1976 in Brazilian football =

Football in Brazil
- Season: 1976

The following article presents a summary of the 1976 football (soccer) season in Brazil, which was the 75th season of competitive football in the country.

== Campeonato Brasileiro Série A ==
Semifinals

Home team	Score	Away team
Fluminense	1-1 (1-4 pen)	Corinthians
Internacional	2-1	Atlético Mineiro

Final

December 12, 1976

Internacional	2–0	Corinthians

Beira-Rio

Internacional declared as the Campeonato Brasileiro champions.

== State championship champions ==
State	Champion	State	Champion
Acre	Juventus-AC	Pará	Paysandu
Alagoas	CRB	Paraíba	Botafogo-PB
Amapá	Ypiranga	Paraná	Coritiba
Amazonas	Nacional	Pernambuco	Santa Cruz
Bahia	Bahia	Piauí	Flamengo-PI
Ceará	Ceará	Rio de Janeiro	Central
Distrito Federal	Brasília	Rio Grande do Norte	ABC
Espírito Santo	Vitória-ES	Rio Grande do Sul	Internacional
Goiás	Goiás	Rondônia	Moto Clube
Guanabara	Fluminense	Roraima	Atlético Roraima
Maranhão	Sampaio Corrêa	Santa Catarina	Joinville
Mato Grosso	Operário-CG	São Paulo	Palmeiras
Mato Grosso do Sul	-	Sergipe	Confiança
Minas Gerais	Atlético Mineiro	Tocantins	-

== Youth competition champions ==
Competition	Champion
Copa São Paulo de Juniores	Atlético Mineiro

== Other competition champions ==
Competition	Champion
Taça Minas Gerais	Atlético Mineiro
Torneio de Integração da Amazônia	Rio Branco
Torneio José Américo de Almeida Filho	Vitória

== Brazilian clubs in international competitions ==
Team	Copa Libertadores 1976	Intercontinental Cup 1976
Cruzeiro	Champions defeated (Argentina) River Plate	Runner-up lost to (Germany) Bayern Munich
Internacional	Group stage eliminated finished second in the group	N/A

== Brazil national team ==
The following table lists all the games played by the Brazil national football team in official competitions and friendly matches during 1976.

Date	City	Opposition	Result	Score	Brazil scorers	Competition
February 21, 1976	(Brazil) Brasília	(Federal District (Brazil)) Brasília Combined Team	W	1-0	Flecha	International Friendly (unofficial match)
February 25, 1976	(Uruguay) Montevideo	Uruguay	W	2-1	Nelinho, Zico	Taça do Atlântico/Taça Rio Branco
February 27, 1976	(Argentina) Buenos Aires	Argentina	W	2-1	Lula, Zico	Taça do Atlântico/Roca Cup
April 7, 1976	(Paraguay) Asunción	Paraguay	D	1-1	Éneas	Taça do Atlântico/Taça Oswaldo Cruz
April 28, 1976	(Brazil) Rio de Janeiro	Uruguay	W	2-1	Rivellino, Zico	Taça do Atlântico/Taça Rio Branco
May 19, 1976	(Brazil) Rio de Janeiro	Argentina	W	2-0	Lula, Neca	Taça do Atlântico/Roca Cup
May 23, 1976	(United States) Los Angeles	England	W	1-0	Roberto Dinamite	USA Bicentenary Cup
May 28, 1976	(United States) Seattle	(United States) NASL Combined Team	W	2-0	Gil (2)	USA Bicentenary Cup
May 31, 1976	(United States) New Haven	Italy	W	4-1	Gil (2), Zico, Roberto Dinamite	USA Bicentenary Cup
June 2, 1976	(United States) San Francisco	(Mexico) UNAM	W	4-3	Gil, Zico, Roberto Dinamite (2)	International Friendly (unofficial match)
June 4, 1976	(Mexico) Guadalajara	Mexico	W	3-0	Roberto Dinamite (2), Gil	International Friendly
June 9, 1976	(Brazil) Rio de Janeiro	Paraguay	W	3-1	Roberto Dinamite (2), Zico	Taça do Atlântico/Taça Oswaldo Cruz
October 6, 1976	(Brazil) Rio de Janeiro	(Brazil) Flamengo	L	0-2	-	International Friendly (unofficial match)
December 1, 1976	(Brazil) Rio de Janeiro	Soviet Union	W	2-0	Falcão, Zico	International Friendly
