= Colombia at the Copa América =

Country in the Copa America

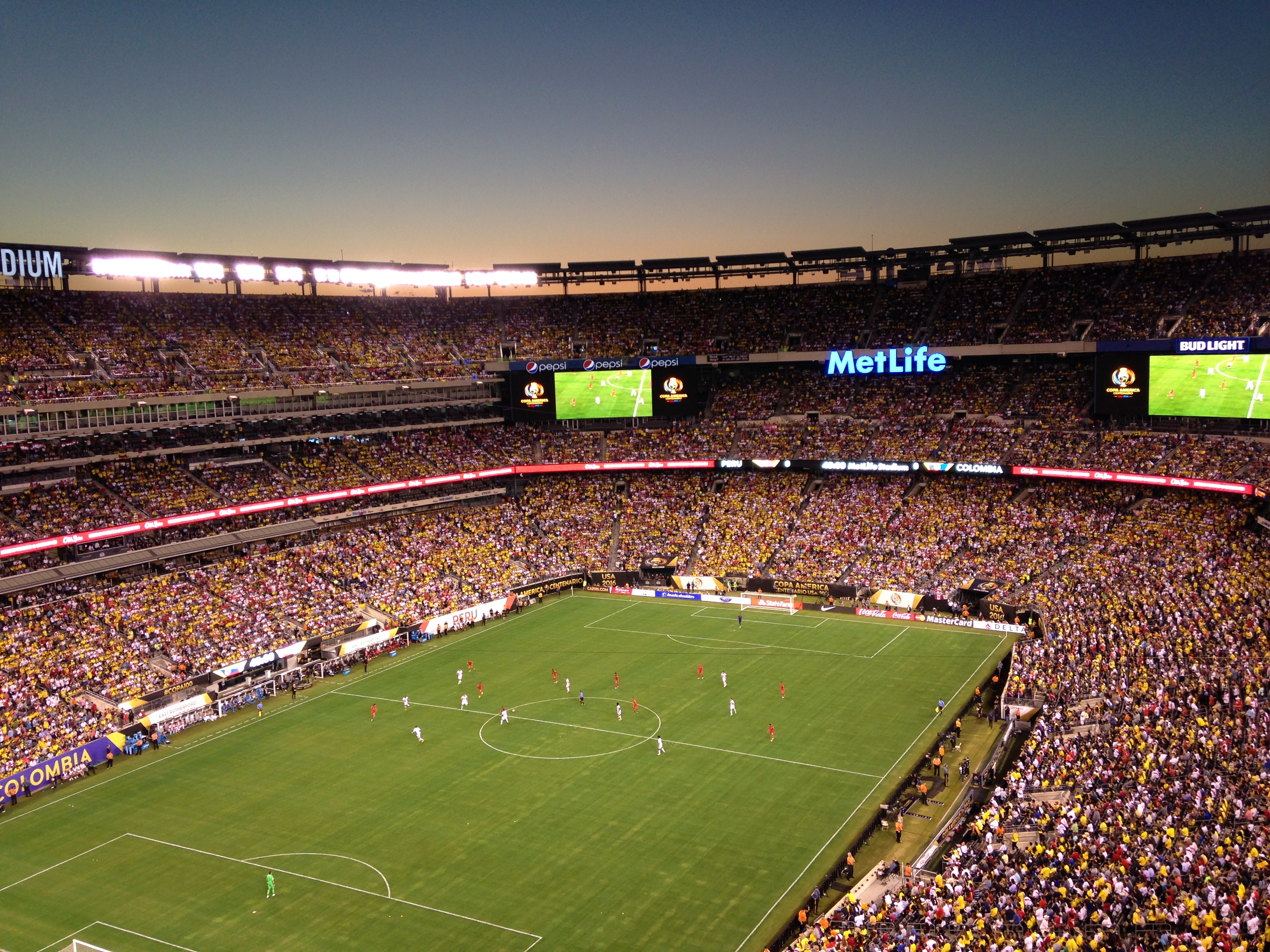
Colombia playing Peru in the quarter-finals of the Copa América Centenario at MetLife Stadium in 2016.

The Copa América is the main football competition of the men's national football teams governed by CONMEBOL. Held since 1916, it is the oldest international continental football competition. It was originally called the South American Championship, changing to the current name in 1975.

Colombia have played in three Copa América finals. They lost the 1975 final play-off against Peru, but won the title at their first home tournament in 2001 after defeating Mexico. They then lost to Argentina in the 2024 final.

== Overall record ==
South American Championship / Copa América record
Year	Round	Position	Pld	W	D	L	GF	GA	Squad
(Argentina) 1916	Not a CONMEBOL member								
(Uruguay) 1917	Not a CONMEBOL member								
(Brazil) 1919	Not a CONMEBOL member								
(Chile) 1920	Not a CONMEBOL member								
(Argentina) 1921	Not a CONMEBOL member								
(Brazil) 1922	Not a CONMEBOL member								
(Uruguay) 1923	Not a CONMEBOL member								
(Uruguay) 1924	Not a CONMEBOL member								
(Argentina) 1925	Not a CONMEBOL member								
(Chile) 1926	Not a CONMEBOL member								
(Peru) 1927	Not a CONMEBOL member								
(Argentina) 1929	Not a CONMEBOL member								
(Peru) 1935	Not a CONMEBOL member								
(Argentina) 1937	Withdrew								
(Peru) 1939	Withdrew								
(Chile) 1941	Withdrew								
(Uruguay) 1942	Withdrew								
(Chile) 1945	Fifth place	5th	6	1	1	4	7	25	Squad
(Argentina) 1946	Withdrew								
(Ecuador) 1947	Eighth place	8th	7	0	2	5	2	19	Squad
(Brazil) 1949	Eighth place	8th	7	0	2	5	4	23	Squad
(Peru) 1953	Withdrew								
(Chile) 1955	Withdrew								
(Uruguay) 1956	Withdrew								
(Peru) 1957	Fifth place	5th	6	2	0	4	10	25	Squad
(Argentina) 1959	Withdrew								
(Ecuador) 1959	Withdrew								
(Bolivia) 1963	Seventh place	7th	6	0	1	5	10	19	Squad
(Uruguay) 1967	Did not qualify								
1975	Runners-up	2nd	9	6	0	3	11	5	Squad
1979	Group stage	5th	4	2	1	1	5	2	Squad
1983	Group stage	7th	4	1	2	1	5	5	Squad
(Argentina) 1987	Third place	3rd	4	3	0	1	8	3	Squad
(Brazil) 1989	Group stage	6th	4	1	2	1	5	4	Squad
(Chile) 1991	Fourth place	4th	7	2	2	3	5	6	Squad
(Ecuador) 1993	Third place	3rd	6	3	2	1	6	4	Squad
(Uruguay) 1995	Third place	3rd	6	3	1	2	7	8	Squad
(Bolivia) 1997	Quarter-finals	8th	4	1	0	3	6	7	Squad
(Paraguay) 1999	Quarter-finals	5th	4	3	0	1	8	4	Squad
(Colombia) 2001	Champions	1st	6	6	0	0	11	0	Squad
(Peru) 2004	Fourth place	4th	6	3	1	2	7	7	Squad
(Venezuela) 2007	Group stage	9th	3	1	0	2	3	9	Squad
(Argentina) 2011	Quarter-finals	6th	4	2	1	1	3	2	Squad
(Chile) 2015	Quarter-finals	6th	4	1	2	1	1	1	Squad
(United States) 2016	Third place	3rd	6	3	1	2	7	6	Squad
(Brazil) 2019	Quarter-finals	5th	4	3	1	0	4	0	Squad
(Brazil) 2021	Third place	3rd	7	2	3	2	7	7	Squad
(United States) 2024	Runners-up	2nd	6	4	1	1	12	3	Squad
Total	1 Title	24/48	130	53	26	51	154	194	—

== 2001 Copa América ==
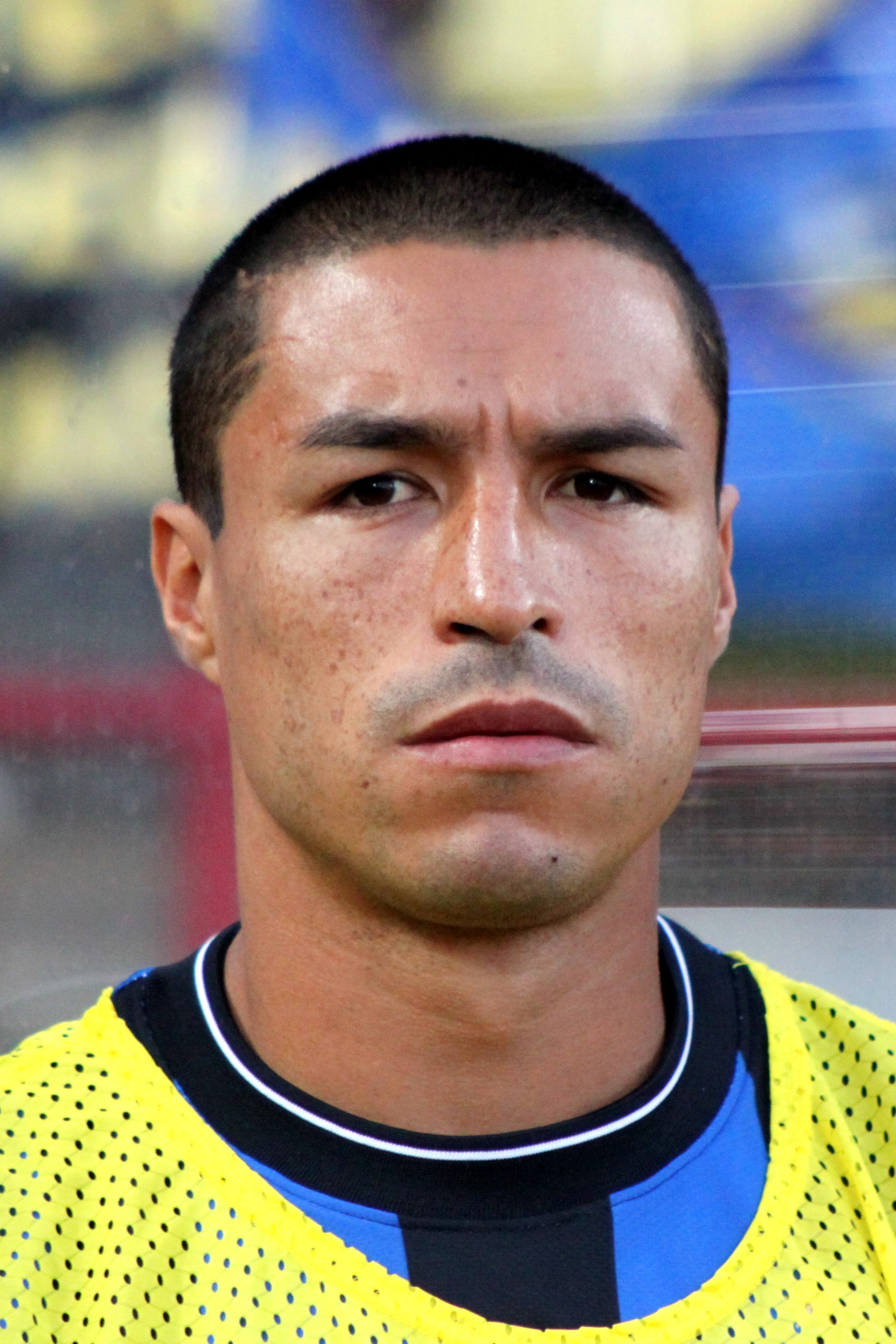
Iván Córdoba scored the decisive 1-0 in the 2001 Copa América final against Mexico. It was the defender's last goal of his international career, although he kept playing for Colombia for 10 more years.

Colombia won all six tournament matches in regular time and without conceding. This achievement is a rarity in Copa América history. The same feat was achieved by Uruguay in 1917 and 1987, and by Argentina in 1921. However, those teams only played two or three matches at those tournaments. Víctor Aristizábal, who played for Cali in the Colombian division at the time, scored in all matches except the final at least once and became the tournament's top scorer.

Round	Opponent	Score	Result	Colombia scorers	Venue
Group stage	Venezuela	2–0	W	F. Grisales, V. Aristizábal (p)	Barranquilla
Group stage	Ecuador	1–0	W	V. Aristizábal	Barranquilla
Group stage	Chile	2–0	W	V. Aristizábal (p), E. Arriaga	Barranquilla
Quarter-finals	Peru	3–0	W	V. Aristizábal (2), G. Hernández	Armenia
Semi-finals	Honduras	2–0	W	G. Bedoya, V. Aristizábal	Manizales
Final	Mexico	1–0	W	I. Córdoba	Bogotá

== Record by opponent ==
Colombia's highest victory in tournament history is a 5–0 win against Panama in 2024. Their biggest defeat was a 0–9 loss against Brazil in 1957.

South American Championship/Copa América matches (by team)
Opponent	W	D	L	Pld	GF	GA
Argentina	3	5	8	16	17	40
Bolivia	4	5	3	12	14	14
Brazil	2	2	8	12	6	32
Chile	2	3	7	12	11	20
Costa Rica	4	0	1	5	12	4
Ecuador	10	1	2	13	23	12
Honduras	1	0	0	1	2	0
Mexico	2	0	1	3	4	3
Panama	1	0	0	1	5	0
Paraguay	6	1	5	12	13	17
Peru	3	7	8	18	17	30
Qatar	1	0	0	1	1	0
United States	4	0	0	4	8	1
Uruguay	4	3	6	13	10	18
Venezuela	4	2	1	7	11	3
Total	51	29	50	130	154	194

== Record players ==
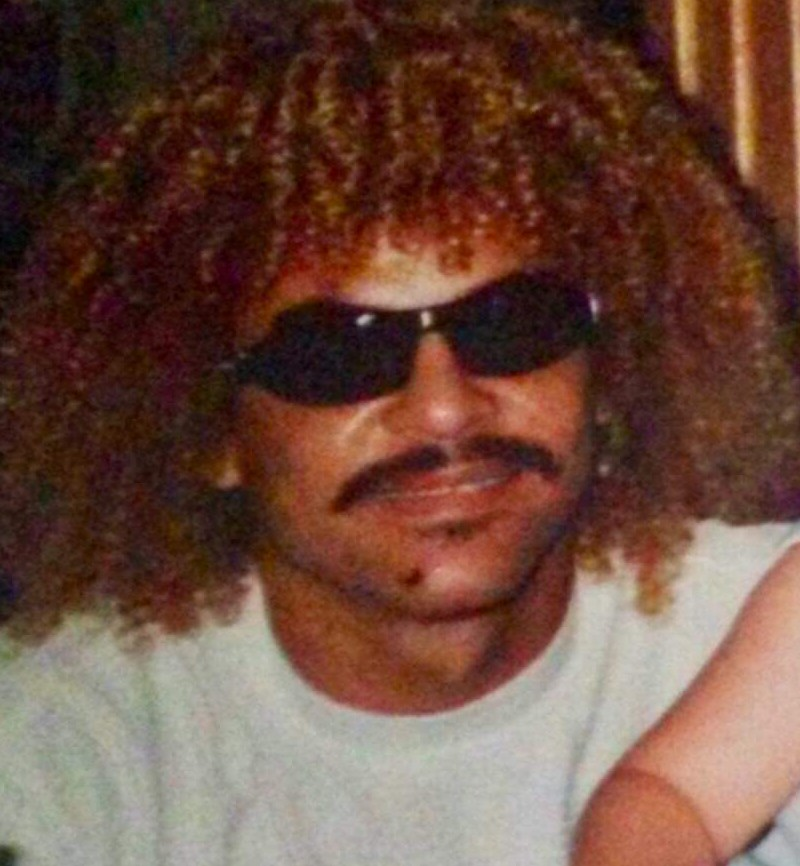
Carlos Valderrama is Colombia's player with the joint-most Copa América matches. He was honoured as best player at the 1987 tournament.

Rank	Player	Matches	Tournaments
1	Leonel Álvarez	27	1987, 1989, 1991, 1993 and 1995
1	Carlos Valderrama	27	1987, 1989, 1991, 1993 and 1995
3	René Higuita	22	1987, 1989, 1991, 1995 and 1999
4	Juan Cuadrado	21	2011, 2015, 2016, 2019 and 2021
5	Víctor Aristizábal	20	1993, 1995, 1997 and 2001
5	James Rodríguez	20	2015, 2016, 2019 and 2024
7	Arnoldo Iguarán	19	1979, 1983, 1987, 1989 and 1991
7	Luis Carlos Perea	19	1987, 1989, 1991 and 1993
9	Freddy Rincón	18	1991, 1993 and 1995
9	David Ospina	18	2015, 2016, 2019 and 2021

== Top goalscorers ==
Rank	Player	Goals	Tournaments (goals)
1	Arnoldo Iguarán	10	1979 (1), 1987 (4), 1989 (3) and 1991 (2)
2	Víctor Aristizábal	8	1993 (1), 1997 (1) and 2001 (6)
3	Luis Díaz	6	2021 (4) and 2024 (2)
4	Delio Gamboa	5	1957 (3) and 1963 (2)
4	Ernesto Díaz	5	1975 (4) and 1979 (1)
6	Carlos Arango	4	1947 (1) and 1957 (3)
6	Antony de Ávila	4	1989 (1) and 1991 (3)
6	Freddy Rincón	4	1993 (1) and 1995 (3)
9	Fulgencio Berdugo	3	1945 (2) and 1949 (1)
9	Neider Morantes	3	1997 (2) and 1999 (1)
9	James Rodríguez	3	2016 (2) and 2024 (1)

== Awards and records ==
Team awards

- Champions (1): 2001
- Runners-up (2): 1975, 2024
- Third place (5): 1987, 1993, 1995, 2016, 2021
- Fair Play Award: 2024

Individual awards

- MVP 1987: Carlos Valderrama
- MVP 2024: James Rodríguez
- Top scorer 1975: Ernesto Díaz (4 goals) (shared)
- Top scorer 1987: Arnoldo Iguarán (4 goals)
- Top scorer 2001: Víctor Aristizábal (6 goals)
- Top scorer 2021: Luis Díaz (4 goals) (shared)
- Best young player 2015: Jeison Murillo

== See also ==
- Colombia at the CONCACAF Gold Cup
- Colombia at the FIFA World Cup
