= José Zárate =

José Zárate may refer to:

- José Zárate (politician) (1896-1956), Chilean mining engineer, accountant and Radical Party politician
- José Zárate (footballer) (1949-2013), Colombian footballer
