= Juan Ocampo =

Juan Ocampo may refer to:

- Juan Antonio Ocampo (born 1989), Mexican footballer
- Juan Carlos Ocampo (born 1955), Uruguayan footballer
- Juan José Ocampo, Honduran footballer
