= Edgar Angulo =

Colombian footballer (born 1953)

Personal information
- Date of birth: 2 March 1953 (age 73)
- Position: Defender

International career
Years	Team	Apps	(Gls)
1975	Colombia	1	(0)

Edgar Angulo (born 2 March 1953) is a Colombian footballer. He played in one match for the Colombia national football team in 1975. He was also part of Colombia's squad for the 1975 Copa América tournament.
