= Miguel Escobar (Colombian footballer) =

Colombian footballer (1945–2023)

Personal information
- Full name: Miguel Antonio Escobar Montalvo
- Date of birth: 18 April 1945
- Place of birth: Buga, Valle del Cauca, Colombia
- Date of death: 11 April 2023 (aged 77)
- Place of death: Buga, Valle del Cauca, Colombia
- Position: Defender

Senior career*
Years	Team	Apps	(Gls)
1965–1966	Deportivo Pereira		
1967–1980	Deportivo Cali		
1981	Independiente Santa Fe		

International career
1975–1979	Colombia	15	(0)
- * Club domestic league appearances and goals

Miguel Antonio Escobar Montalvo (18 April 1945 – 11 April 2023) was a Colombian footballer who played as a defender. He made 15 appearances for the Colombia national team from 1975 to 1979. He was also part of Colombia's squad for the 1975 Copa América tournament.
