= Ramón Iriarte (footballer) =

Venezuelan footballer (born 1948)

Personal information
- Date of birth: 12 January 1948 (age 78)
- Position: Forward

International career
| Years | Team | Apps | (Gls) |
| 1969–1975 | Venezuela | 6 | (1) |

Ramón Iriarte (born 12 January 1948) is a Venezuelan footballer.

He played mainly for the "Deportivo Galicia", but also (from 1974 to 1977) for the "Deportivo Italia" and the Deportivo San Cristóbal.

He played in six matches for the Venezuela national football team from 1969 to 1975. He was also part of Venezuela's squad for the 1975 Copa América tournament.
