= Colombia at the CONCACAF Gold Cup =

The CONCACAF Gold Cup is North America's major tournament in senior men's football and determines the continental champion. Until 1989, the tournament was known as CONCACAF Championship. It is currently held every two years. In earlier editions, the continental championship was held in different countries, but since the inception of the Gold Cup in 1991, the United States are constant hosts or co-hosts.

From 1973 to 1989, the tournament doubled as the confederation's World Cup qualification. CONCACAF's representative team at the FIFA Confederations Cup was decided by a play-off between the winners of the last two tournament editions in 2015 via the CONCACAF Cup, but was then discontinued along with the Confederations Cup.

Since the inaugural tournament in 1963, the Gold Cup was held 28 times and has been won by seven different nations, most often by Mexico (13 titles).

In select editions, teams from other confederations have regularly joined the tournament as invitees. During this time span, Colombia participated three times, in 2000, 2003 and 2005. They reached the tournament's final in 2000, but lost 2–0 to Canada. Thanks to their good results, they rank 15th out of 33 nations in the tournament's all-time table, in spite of only three participations.

== Record at the CONCACAF Championship/Gold Cup ==
CONCACAF Gold Cup
Year	Result	Position	Pld	W	D	L	GF	GA
(United States) 2000	Runners-up	2nd	5	2	1	2	5	7
(Mexico) (United States) 2003	Quarter-finals	5th	3	1	1	1	2	3
(United States) 2005	Semi-finals	4th	5	2	0	3	7	7
Total	3/28	15/33	13	5	2	6	14	17

== 2000 CONCACAF Gold Cup ==
=== Group stage ===
Team	Pld	W	D	L	GF	GA	GD	Pts
Honduras	2	2	0	0	4	0	+4	6
Colombia	2	1	0	1	1	2	–1	3
Jamaica	2	0	0	2	0	3	–3	0

February 12, 2000
21:00 ET

Colombia	1–0	Jamaica
Martínez 15'	Report

Orange Bowl, Miami
Attendance: 49,591
Referee: Felipe Ramos (Mexico)

February 16, 2000
19:00 ET

Honduras	2–0	Colombia
Pavón 71'; Nuñez 78'	Report

Orange Bowl, Miami
Attendance: 36,004
Referee: Ramesh Ramdhan (Trinidad and Tobago)

=== Quarter-finals ===
February 19, 2000
15:00 ET

United States	2–2 (a.e.t.)	Colombia
McBride 20'; Armas 51'	Report	Asprilla 24'; Bedoya 81'
Penalties
Wynalda (penalty missed); Reyna (penalty missed); Lewis (penalty scored); Armas (penalty missed); Olsen (penalty missed)	1–2	(penalty missed) Pérez; (penalty scored) Martínez; (penalty missed) Candelo; (penalty scored) Mosquera

Orange Bowl, Miami
Attendance: 32,972
Referee: Carlos Batres (Guatemala)

=== Semi-finals ===
February 23, 2000
20:00 ET

Colombia	2–1	Peru
Salazar 39' (o.g.); Bonilla 53'	Report	Palacios 75'

Qualcomm Stadium, San Diego
Attendance: 3,402
Referee: Rafael Rodríguez (El Salvador)

=== Final ===
February 27, 2000
12:00 ET

Canada	2–0	Colombia
De Vos 45'; Corazzin 68' (pen.)	Report

Memorial Coliseum, Los Angeles
Attendance: 7,000
Referee: Peter Prendergast (Jamaica)

== 2003 CONCACAF Gold Cup ==
=== Group stage ===
Team	Pld	W	D	L	GF	GA	GD	Pts
Colombia	2	1	1	0	2	1	+1	4
Jamaica	2	1	0	1	2	1	+1	3
Guatemala	2	0	1	1	1	3	−2	1

July 12, 2003

Jamaica	0–1	Colombia
	Report	Patiño 42'

Orange Bowl, Miami
Attendance: 15,423
Referee: Kevin Stott (United States)

July 16, 2003

Colombia	1–1	Guatemala
Molina 79'	Report	Ruiz 21' (pen.)

Orange Bowl, Miami
Attendance: 11,233
Referee: Grevin Porras (Costa Rica)

=== Quarter-finals ===
July 19, 2003

Colombia	0–2	Brazil
	Report	Kaká 42', 66'

Orange Bowl, Miami
Attendance: 23,425
Referee: Ken Stott (United States)

== 2005 CONCACAF Gold Cup ==
=== Group stage ===
Team	Pld	W	D	L	GF	GA	GD	Pts
Honduras	3	2	1	0	4	2	+2	7
Panama	3	1	1	1	3	3	0	4
Colombia	3	1	0	2	3	3	0	3
Trinidad and Tobago	3	0	2	1	3	5	−2	2

July 6, 2005

Colombia	0–1	Panama
	Report	Tejada 70'

Orange Bowl, Miami
Attendance: 10,311
Referee: Carlos Batres (Guatemala)
July 9, 2005

Honduras	2–1	Colombia
Velásquez 79', 82'	Report	Moreno 30' (pen.)

Orange Bowl, Miami
Attendance: 17,292
Referee: Marco Rodríguez (Mexico)

July 11, 2005

Colombia	2–0	Trinidad and Tobago
Aguilar 77'; Hurtado 79'	Report

Orange Bowl, Miami
Attendance: 8,457
Referee: Marco Rodríguez (Mexico)

=== Quarter-finals ===
July 17, 2005
15:00

Mexico	1–2	Colombia
Pineda 65'	Report	Castrillón 58'; Aguilar 74'

Reliant Stadium, Houston
Attendance: 60,050
Referee: Rodolfo Sibrian (El Salvador)

=== Semi-finals ===
July 21, 2005
21:00

Colombia	2–3	Panama
Patiño 63', 89'	Report	Phillips 11', 73'; Jo. Dely Valdés 26'

Giants Stadium, East Rutherford
Attendance: 41,721
Referee: Rodolfo Sibrian (El Salvador)

== Record players ==
Rank	Player	Matches	Tournaments
1	Faryd Mondragón	8	2003 and 2005
1	Jairo Patiño	8	2003 and 2005
3	Héctor Hurtado	7	2000 and 2005
4	Faustino Asprilla	5	2000
4	Gonzalo Martínez	5	2000
4	Andrés Mosquera	5	2000
4	John Wilmar Pérez	5	2000
4	Martín Zapata	5	2000
4	Abel Aguilar	5	2005
4	Martin Arzuaga	5	2005
4	José de la Cuesta	5	2005
4	Humberto Mendoza	5	2005
4	Wason Rentería	5	2005

== Top goalscorers ==
Rank	Player	Goals	Tournaments
1	Jairo Patiño	3	2003 (1), 2005 (2)
2	Abel Aguilar	2	2005
3	Faustino Asprilla	1	2000
3	Gerardo Bedoya	1	2000
3	Víctor Bonilla	1	2000
3	Gonzalo Martínez	1	2000
3	Mauricio Molina	1	2003
3	Jaime Castrillón	1	2005
3	Héctor Hurtado	1	2005
3	Tressor Moreno	1	2005

== See also ==
- Colombia at the Copa América
- Colombia at the FIFA Confederations Cup
- Colombia at the FIFA World Cup
