= Clemente Rolón =

Paraguayan footballer (born 1951)

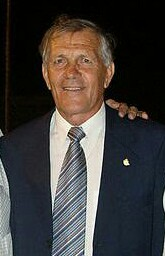

Personal information
- Date of birth: 23 November 1951 (age 74)
- Place of birth: Asunción, Paraguay

International career
Years	Team	Apps	(Gls)
1975	Paraguay	4	(3)

Clemente Rolón (born 23 November 1951) is a Paraguayan footballer. He played in four matches for the Paraguay national football team in 1975. He was also part of Paraguay's squad for the 1975 Copa América tournament.
