= Gonzalo Castañeda =

Ecuadorian footballer (born 1947)

Personal information
- Date of birth: 24 January 1947 (age 79)
- Position: Forward

International career
Years	Team	Apps	(Gls)
1975	Ecuador	4	(2)

Gonzalo Castañeda (born 24 January 1947) is an Ecuadorian former footballer. He played in four matches for the Ecuador national football team in 1975. He was also part of Ecuador's squad for the 1975 Copa América tournament.
