= Enrique Casaretto =

Peruvian footballer (1945–2020)

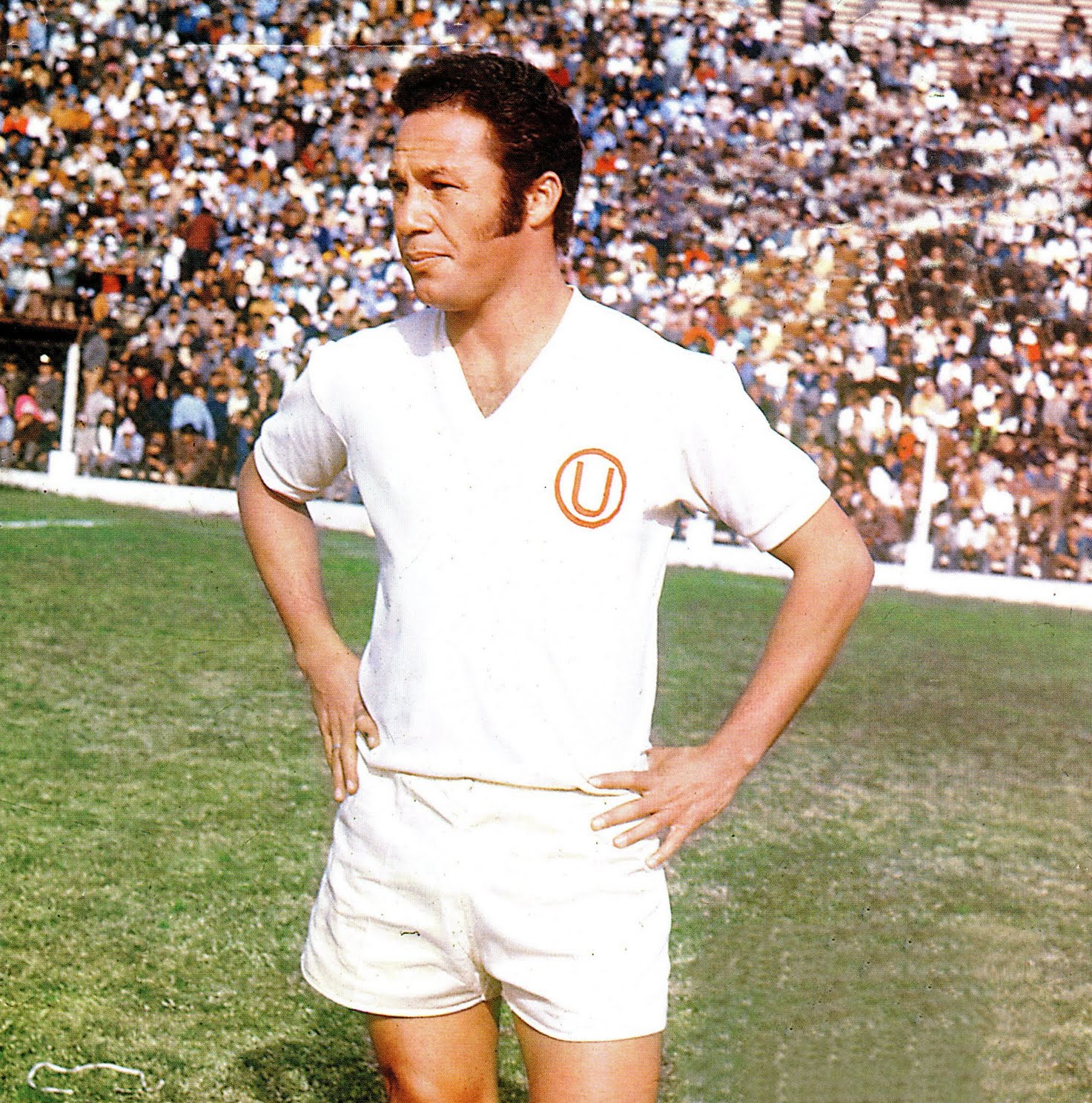
- Casaretto playing for Universitario

Personal information
- Date of birth: 29 April 1945
- Place of birth: Chiclayo, Peru
- Date of death: 22 June 2020 (aged 75)
- Place of death: Lima, Peru
- Position: Forward

Senior career*
Years	Team	Apps	(Gls)
1962–1964	Atlético Grau		
1965–1970	Universitario		
1971–1972	Defensor Lima		
1973–1974	Atlético Chalaco		
1975	Sporting Cristal		
1976	Miami Toros	6	(0)

International career
1968–1975	Peru	10	(8)
Medal record
Men's football
Representing Peru
Copa América
Winner	1975
- * Club domestic league appearances and goals

Enrique Casaretto (29 April 1945 – 22 June 2020) was a Peruvian footballer. He was part of Peru's squad for the 1975 Copa América tournament.

== Biography ==
=== Club career ===
Apart from a short stint in the United States (with Miami Toros in 1976), Enrique Casaretto spent his entire career in Peru. He made his debut with Atlético Grau in 1962, but it was with Universitario de Deportes that he distinguished himself in the late 1960s, forming an attacking line – notably with Percy Rojas and Ángel Uribe – that allowed the Merengue club to win three Peruvian championships in 1966, 1967 and 1969.

=== International career ===
A Peruvian international from 1968 to 1975, Enrique Casaretto played 10 matches and scored eight goals. He played a major role in Peru's qualification for the 1975 Copa América final, scoring twice in the semi-final against Brazil in Belo Horizonte. Paradoxically, he did not play in the final, which his team won against Colombia.

=== Death ===
Cassaretto died at the age of 75, after being hospitalized in recent days due to pulmonary fibrosis.

== Honours ==
Universitario de Deportes

- Peruvian League: 1966, 1967, 1969

Peru

- Copa América: 1975
