= Oscar Bolaño =

Colombian footballer (1951-2017)

Óscar Bolaño
Personal information
- Full name: Óscar Emilio Bolaño Meza
- Date of birth: 14 May 1951
- Place of birth: Santa Marta
- Date of death: 29 January 2017 (aged 65)
- Position: Defender

International career
Years	Team	Apps	(Gls)
1973–1983	Colombia	29	(0)

Óscar Emilio Bolaño Meza (14 May 1951 – 29 January 2017) was a Colombian footballer.

== Club career ==
For Independiente Santa Fe and Atlético Junior Bolaño appeared in the Copa Libertadores. With both teams he won the Colombian football championship.

== Honours ==
Independiente Santa Fe

- Primera División: 1975

Atlético Junior

- Primera División: 1977, 1980

== International career ==
He played in 29 matches for the Colombian national team from June 1975 to August 1983. He was part of Colombia's squad for the 1975, 1979 and 1983 Copa América tournaments.

== Personal life ==
His children Oscar, Hugo and Jorge also were footballers. Jorge Bolaño was captain of Atlético Junior between 1996 and 1999 and played with Colombia in the 1998 FIFA World Cup.
