= Arturo Segovia =

Colombian footballer (born 1941)

Personal information
- Full name: Arturo Rafael Segovia Pacheco
- Date of birth: 26 October 1941 (age 85)
- Place of birth: Soledad, Colombia
- Position: Defender

International career
Years	Team	Apps	(Gls)
1966–1977	Colombia	36	(0)

Arturo Rafael Segovia Pacheco (born 26 October 1941) is a Colombian footballer. He played in 15 matches for the Colombia national football team from 1967 to 1977. He was also part of Colombia's squad for the 1975 Copa América tournament.
