= Luis Araneda =

Chilean footballer (born 1953)

Personal information
- Full name: Luis Antonio Araneda Jorquera
- Date of birth: 9 May 1953 (age 73)
- Place of birth: Santiago, Chile

Senior career*
Years	Team	Apps	(Gls)
1970–1977	Colo-Colo		
1971	→ Green Cross-Temuco (loan)		
1972–1973	→ Lota Schwager (loan)		
1978	Audax Italiano		
1979	Santiago Morning		
1980	LD Estudiantil		
1981	Trasandino		
1982–1983	Everton		
1984–1985	San Luis		
1985	Deportes Valdivia		
1986–1987	Soinca Bata		
1988	Deportes Maipo		

International career
1974–1976	Chile	4	(2)
- * Club domestic league appearances and goals

Luis Antonio Araneda Jorquera (born 9 May 1953) is a Chilean former footballer. He played in four matches for the Chile national team from 1974 to 1976. He was also part of Chile's squad for the 1975 Copa América tournament.
