= Taça do Atlântico =

- Organiser(s): (Argentina) AFA (Brazil) CBF (Uruguay) AUF (Paraguay) APF
- Founded: 1956
- Abolished: 1976; 50 years ago
- Region: South America
- Teams: 4
- Last champions: Brazil (1976)
- Most championships: Brazil (3 titles)

Taça do Atlântico (English: Atlantic Cup, Spanish: Copa del Atlántico) was a national football team's competition held between 1956 and 1976 on an irregular basis, contested by the national football teams from South America.

Teams participating were Argentina, Brazil, Paraguay and Uruguay national sides. Paraguay did not play in the first edition of the competition. There were 3 championships and Brazil won them all. In 1956, a club competition was played in parallel to the main competition, but the final between Boca Juniors and Corinthians was never played.

== 1956 Taça do Atlântico ==
Team	Pld	W	D	L	GF	GA	GD	Pts
Brazil	2	1	1	0	2	0	+2	3
Argentina	2	1	1	0	2	1	+1	3
Uruguay	2	0	0	2	1	4	−3	0

24 June 1956

Brazil	2–0	Uruguay
Zizinho ?'; Canário ?'

Maracanã Stadium, Rio de Janeiro
1 July 1956

Uruguay	1–2	Argentina
Julio Abbadie 56'		Ernesto Grillo 52', 82'

Estadio Centenario, Montevideo
8 July 1956

Argentina	0–0	Brazil

Estadio Presidente Juan Domingo Perón, Avellaneda

== 1960 Taça do Atlântico ==
Team	Pld	W	D	L	GF	GA	GD	Pts
Brazil	3	2	0	1	7	3	+4	4
Argentina	3	2	0	1	6	5	+1	4
Uruguay	3	2	0	1	3	5	−2	4
Paraguay	3	0	0	3	2	5	−3	0

3 July 1960

Paraguay	1–2	Brazil
Cabrera ?'		Delém ?'; Almir Pernambuquinho ?'

Estadio Dr. Nicolás Léoz, Asunción
9 July 1960

Argentina	1–0	Paraguay
Sosa ?'

River Plate Stadium, Buenos Aires
9 July 1960

Uruguay	1–0	Brazil
Pérez ?'

Estadio Centenario, Montevideo
12 July 1960

Brazil	5–1	Argentina
Chinesinho 18'; Pelé 22'; Pepe 25' (pen.), 83'; Delém 62'		Sosa 6'

Maracanã Stadium, Rio de Janeiro
13 July 1960

Uruguay	2–1	Paraguay
Escalada ?'; Rodríguez Peña ?'		Cabral ?'

Estadio Centenario, Montevideo
17 August 1960

Argentina	4–0	Uruguay
Sanfilippo 48', 59', 69'; Jiménez 53'

River Plate Stadium, Buenos Aires

== 1976 Taça do Atlântico ==
Team	Pld	W	D	L	GF	GA	GD	Pts
Brazil	6	5	1	0	12	5	+7	11
Argentina	6	3	1	2	13	9	+4	7
Paraguay	6	1	3	2	9	11	−2	5
Uruguay	6	0	1	5	5	14	−9	1

Note:

- Matches between Argentina and Paraguay also counted for the 1976 Copa Félix Bogado
- Matches between Argentina and Brazil also counted for the 1976 Roca Cup
- First match between Argentina and Uruguay also counted for the 1976 Copa Lipton
- Second match between Argentina and Uruguay also counted for the 1976 Copa Newton
- Matches between Brazil and Uruguay also counted for the 1976 Copa Río Branco
- Matches between Brazil and Paraguay also counted for the 1976 Taça Oswaldo Cruz

25 February 1976

Paraguay	2–3	Argentina
Aquino 4' (pen.); Báez 53'		Scotta 11', 38', 52'

Estadio Defensores del Chaco, Asunción
25 February 1976

Uruguay	1–2	Brazil
Ocampo ?'		Nelinho ?'; Zico ?'

Estadio Centenario, Montevideo
27 February 1976

Argentina	1–2	Brazil
Kempes 74' (pen.)		Lula 5'; Zico 67'

River Plate Stadium, Buenos Aires
10 March 1976

Uruguay	2–2	Paraguay
Ocampo ?'; Pereyra ?'		Pesoa ?'; Paniagua ?'

Estadio Centenario, Montevideo
7 April 1976

Paraguay	1–1	Brazil
Osvaldo Aquino ?' (pen.)		Enéas ?'

Estadio Defensores del Chaco, Asunción
8 April 1976

Argentina	4–1	Uruguay
Kempes 21', 57'; Luque 50'; Scotta 89'		Pereyra 79'

José Amalfitani Stadium, Buenos Aires
28 April 1976

Brazil	2–1	Uruguay
Rivellino 55'; Zico 72' (pen.)		Jorge Torres 15'

Maracanã Stadium, Rio de Janeiro
28 April 1976

Argentina	2–2	Paraguay
Kempes 48', 50'		Francisco Riveros 70'; Aquino 72' (pen.)

José Amalfitani Stadium, Buenos Aires
19 May 1976

Brazil	2–0	Argentina
Lula 64'; Neca 88'

Maracanã Stadium, Rio de Janeiro
19 May 1976

Paraguay	1–0	Uruguay
Solalinde ?'

Asunción
9 June 1976

Uruguay	0–3	Argentina
		Luque 2'; Kempes 11'; Houseman 28'

Estadio Centenario, Montevideo
9 June 1976

Brazil	3–1	Paraguay
Roberto Dinamite ?' ??'; Zico		Díaz ?'

Maracanã Stadium, Rio de Janeiro

== All-time scorers ==
Player	Goals
(Argentina) Mario Kempes	6
(Argentina) Héctor Scotta	4
(Brazil) Zico	4
(Argentina) José Sanfilippo	3
(Paraguay) Osvaldo Aquino	3
(Brazil) Lula	2
(Argentina) Leopoldo Luque	2
(Brazil) Roberto Dinamite	2
(Uruguay) Darío Pereyra	2
(Argentina) Ernesto Grillo	2
(Argentina) Rubén H. Sosa	2

== Hat-tricks ==
Since the first official tournament in 1956, 2 hat-tricks have been scored in over 20 matches of the 3 editions of the tournament. The first hat-trick was scored by José Sanfilippo of Argentina, during a Clásico del Río de la Plata against Uruguay on 17 August 1960; and the last was by Héctor Scotta, who netted a hat-trick for Argentina, but this time against Paraguay in a 3-2 win on 25 February 1976.

Taça do Atlântico hat-tricks
#	Player	G	Time of goals	For	Result	Against	Tournament	Date	FIFA report
1.	José Sanfilippo	3	48', 59', 69'	Argentina	4–0	Uruguay	1960 Taça do Atlântico	17 August 1960	Report
2.	Héctor Scotta	3	11', 38', 52'	Argentina	3–2	Paraguay	1976 Taça do Atlântico	25 February 1976	
