= Pedro Zape =

Colombian footballer (born 1949)

Personal information
- Full name: Pedro Antonio Zape Jordán
- Date of birth: June 3, 1949 (age 77)
- Place of birth: Puerto Tejada, Colombia
- Height: 1.78 m (5 ft 10 in)
- Position: Goalkeeper

Youth career
- 1964–1969: Deportivo Cali

Senior career*
Years	Team	Apps	(Gls)
1969–1985	Deportivo Cali		

International career
1972–1985	Colombia	47	(0)
- * Club domestic league appearances and goals as of September 2008

Pedro Antonio Zape Jordán (born June 3, 1949) is a former Colombian football goalkeeper who currently works as a goalkeeping coach.

== Club career ==
Zape is considered to be one of the most important players in the history of Deportivo Cali. He was a member of three championship winning squads in 1969, 1970 and 1974.

== International career ==
Zape played 47 times for the Colombia national team between 1972 and 1985. He played in three editions of the Copa América, including the 1975 tournament when Colombia finished as runners-up. He also played in Copa América 1979 and Copa América 1983.

== Titles ==
Season	Team	Title
1969	Deportivo Cali	Colombian league
1970	Deportivo Cali	Colombian league
1974	Deportivo Cali	Colombian league
1985	America de Cali	Colombian league
1986	America de Cali	Colombian league
