= Ponciano Castro =

Colombian footballer (born 1953)

Personal information
- Date of birth: 28 January 1953 (age 73)
- Position: Midfielder

International career
| Years | Team | Apps | (Gls) |
| 1975 | Colombia | 9 | (2) |

Ponciano Castro (born 28 January 1953) is a Colombian former footballer. He played in nine matches for the Colombia national football team in 1975. He was also part of Colombia's squad for the 1975 Copa América tournament.
