= 1976 U.S.A. Bicentennial Cup Tournament =

International soccer competition

Tournament details
- Host country: United States
- Dates: May 23–31
- Teams: 4 (from 3 confederations)
- Venues: 6 (in 6 host cities)

Final positions
- Champions: Brazil
- Runners-up: England
- Third place: Italy
- Fourth place: (United States) Team America

Tournament statistics
- Matches played: 6
- Goals scored: 21 (3.5 per match)
- Top scorer(s): (Brazil) Gil (4 goals)

The 1976 U.S.A. Bicentennial Cup Tournament was an international association football competition, which took place in May 1976 in the United States. The tournament featured several World Cup stars both past and future.

The tournament - which celebrated the 200th anniversary of the U.S. Declaration of Independence - came about after England and Italy failed to qualify for the 1976 European Championship tournament. These two teams joined Brazil and Team America, a side composed of stars playing in the North American Soccer League.

The U.S. team of the time was not developed enough to compete against sides as powerful as Brazil, Italy and England, and hence Team America, consisting of players of various nationalities drawn from North American Soccer League clubs, carried the U.S. banner in the tournament. Team America included players who had performed for other national teams, among them Pelé, Ramon Mifflin, Mike England, Giorgio Chinaglia and Bobby Moore.

The day after England played Team America, The Football Association, asked about the match's status, said it was regarded as "a training game" and that caps would not be awarded to the participating players. Accordingly, the FA does not include the match in its list of full internationals. The associations of both Brazil and Italy, on the other hand, listed their national sides' matches against Team America as full internationals. Matches against Team America would not meet the new standard FIFA set down in January 2001 for official full internationals because they were not played between the selections of two FIFA country members. FIFA has retroactively removed the official status of matches involving other multinational all-star selections, including England's matches against the Rest of Europe and the Rest of the World (although the FA continues to recognize these as official internationals).

Brazil won the cup, winning all three of their games, while England came second, winning two and losing one; 1–0 against Brazil.

== Results ==
All times local

May 23, 1976
13:00 EDT

| Team America (United States) | 0–4 | Italy |
|---|---|---|
| | | Capello 15'; Pulici 22'; Graziani 72'; Rocca 84' |

Robert F. Kennedy Memorial Stadium, Washington D.C.
Attendance: 33,455
Referee: Walter Hungerbühler (Switzerland)
May 23, 1976
14:30 PDT

| Brazil | 1–0 | England |
|---|---|---|
| Dinamite 89' | Report |

Los Angeles Memorial Coliseum, Los Angeles, California
Attendance: 32,495
Referee: Hans-Joachim Weyland (West Germany)

May 28, 1976
20:00 EDT

| England | 3–2 | Italy |
|---|---|---|
| Channon 46', 53'; Thompson 48' | | Graziani 14', 19' |

Yankee Stadium, New York, New York
Attendance: 40,650
Referee: Hans-Joachim Weyland (West Germany)
May 28, 1976
20:00 PDT

| Team America (United States) | 0–2 | Brazil |
|---|---|---|
| | | Gil 29', 89' |

Kingdome, Seattle, Washington
Attendance: 20,245
Referee: Ramón Barreto (Uruguay)

May 31, 1976
12:00 EDT

| Team America (United States) | 1–3 | England |
|---|---|---|
| Scullion 87' | | Keegan 23', 29'; Francis 54' |

John F. Kennedy Stadium, Philadelphia, Pennsylvania
Attendance: 16,239
Referee: Walter Hungerbühler (Switzerland)
May 31, 1976
15:00 EDT

| Brazil | 4–1 | Italy |
|---|---|---|
| Gil 28', 48'; Zico 76'; Roberto Dinamite 78' | | Capello 2' |

Yale Bowl, New Haven, Connecticut
Attendance: 36,096
Referee: Ramón Barreto (Uruguay)

== Table ==
| | Team | Pld | W | D | L | GF | GA | GD | Pts |
|---|---|---|---|---|---|---|---|---|---|
| 1 | Brazil | 3 | 3 | 0 | 0 | 7 | 1 | +6 | 6 |
| 2 | England | 3 | 2 | 0 | 1 | 6 | 4 | +2 | 4 |
| 3 | Italy | 3 | 1 | 0 | 2 | 7 | 7 | 0 | 2 |
| 4 | (United States) Team America | 3 | 0 | 0 | 3 | 1 | 9 | −8 | 0 |

1976 U.S.A. Bicentennial Cup Tournament winners

Brazil
1st title

== Statistics ==
=== Goalscorers ===
There were 21 goals scored in 6 matches, for an average of 3.5 goals per match.

4 goals

- (Brazil) Gil (4 goals)

3 goals

- (Italy) Francesco Graziani

2 goals

- (Brazil) Roberto Dinamite
- (England) Mick Channon
- (England) Kevin Keegan
- (Italy) Fabio Capello

1 goal

- (Brazil) Zico
- (England) Phil Thompson
- (England) Gerry Francis
- (Italy) Paolo Pulici
- (Italy) Francesco Rocca
- (United States) Stewart Scullion
