= Juan Carlos Ocampo =

Uruguayan footballer (born 1955)

Personal information
- Date of birth: 22 February 1955 (age 71)
- Position: Forward

International career
Years	Team	Apps	(Gls)
1975–1979	Uruguay	6	(1)

Juan Carlos Ocampo (born 22 February 1955) is a Uruguayan footballer. He played in six matches for the Uruguay national football team from 1975 to 1979. He was also part of Uruguay's squad for the 1975 Copa América tournament.
