= José Zárate (footballer) =

Colombian footballer (1949-2013)

Personal information
- Date of birth: 12 November 1949
- Place of birth: Bogotá, Colombia
- Date of death: 24 August 2013 (aged 63)
- Position: Defender

International career
Years	Team	Apps	(Gls)
1975–1977	Colombia	11	(0)

José Zárate (12 November 1949 – 24 August 2013) was a Colombian footballer. He played in eleven matches for the Colombia national football team from 1975 to 1977. He was also part of Colombia's squad for the 1975 Copa América tournament.
