= Oswaldo Calero =

Colombian footballer (1945-1997)

Personal information
- Full name: Oswaldo Antonio Calero Sabán
- Date of birth: 24 April 1945
- Place of birth: Santa Marta
- Date of death: 23 May 1997 (aged 52)
- Place of death: Pereira
- Position: Midfielder

International career
Years	Team	Apps	(Gls)
1975–1977	Colombia	11	(1)

Oswaldo Antonio Calero Sabán (Santa Marta, 24 April 1945 – Pereira 23 May 1997) was a Colombian footballer. He played in eleven matches for the Colombia national football team from 1975 to 1977. He was also part of Colombia's squad for the 1975 Copa América tournament.
