= Ernesto Díaz =

Colombian footballer (1952–2002)

Personal information
- Full name: José Ernesto Díaz Correa
- Date of birth: 13 September 1952
- Date of death: 4 May 2002 (aged 49)
- Height: 1.66 m (5 ft 5 1/2 in)
- Position: Midfielder

Senior career*
Years	Team	Apps	(Gls)
1971–1975	Santa Fe	144	(27)
1976–1977	Standard Liège	6	(0)
1977–1978	Santa Fe	89	(19)
1979	Junior	49	(4)
1980–1981	Independiente Medellín	68	(7)
1982–1983	Millonarios	58	(5)
1984–1986	Santa Fe	34	(5)
1987	Millonarios	0	(0)

International career
1973–1983	Colombia	29	(7)
- * Club domestic league appearances and goals

José Ernesto Díaz Correa (13 September 1952 – 4 May 2002) was a Colombian footballer who played as a midfielder. A Colombian international, he competed in the 1972 Summer Olympics, as well as three editions of the Copa América, earning a runners-up medal and finishing as top scorer in 1975.
