= Campos (footballer) =

Brazilian footballer (born 1952)

Personal information
- Full name: Cosme da Silva Campos
- Date of birth: 21 December 1952 (age 73)
- Place of birth: Pedro Leopoldo, Brazil
- Position: Forward

International career
Years	Team	Apps	(Gls)
1975	Brazil	5	(2)

Cosme da Silva Campos (born 21 December 1952), known as just Campos, is a Brazilian footballer. He played in five matches for the Brazil national football team in 1975. He was also part of Brazil's squad for the 1975 Copa América tournament.
