= Gil (footballer, born 1950) =

Brazilian footballer and manager

Personal information
- Full name: Gilberto Alves
- Date of birth: December 24, 1950 (age 75)
- Place of birth: Nova Lima, Brazil
- Position: Forward

Team information
- Current team: (manager)

Senior career*
Years	Team	Apps	(Gls)
1970–1973	Villa Nova		
1973	Comercial		
1974–1977	Fluminense		
1977–1980	Botafogo	27	(14)
1980	Corinthians	172	(75)
1981	Murcia	31	(12)
1982	Coritiba	39	(13)
1983	Farense		

International career^{‡}
1976–1978	Brazil	41	(13)

Managerial career
- 1983–1984: Farense
- 1989: Botafogo (assistant)
- 1990: Avaí
- 1990: Fortaleza
- 1991: Botafogo
- 1992: Botafogo
- 1996: Alianza Lima
- 2008: Marília
- 2009: Portuguesa Santista
- * Club domestic league appearances and goals as of 00:12, 3 September 2008 (UTC) ‡ National team caps and goals as of 00:12, 3 September 2008 (UTC)

Gilberto Alves, nicknamed Gil (born December 24, 1950, in Nova Lima), is a former footballer from Brazil. He played as a forward, in particular with Fluminense Football Club and the Brazil national team.

== Playing career ==
Gil played for several clubs, starting his career with Villa Nova in 1970, playing for Comercial from 1974 to 1977. He played for Fluminense during the time where the club was nicknamed Máquina Tricolor (Three Color Machine). He then moved to its former club's rivals, Botafogo, where he stayed until 1980, when he joined Corinthians, moving in the subsequent years to Real Murcia of Spain, Coritiba, and Farense of Portugal, respectively.

== National team ==
He received 41 caps, scoring 13 goals from April 1976 to June 1978, and played seven games during the World Cup 1978.

== Managerial career ==
On September 2, 2008, Gilberto Alves was hired as Marília's manager.

== Honours ==
Villa Nova

- Campeonato Brasileiro Série B: 1971

Fluminense

- Campeonato Carioca: 1975 and 1976
- Taça Guanabara: 1975 and 1976

Brazil

- Bicentennial Cup: 1976
