= Danival =

Brazilian footballer (born 1952)

Personal information
- Full name: Danival de Oliveira
- Date of birth: 5 November 1952 (age 73)
- Place of birth: Vespasiano, Brazil
- Position: Midfielder

Senior career*
Years	Team	Apps	(Gls)
1971–1979	Atlético Mineiro	78	(12)
1972	→ Nacional (loan)	18	(1)
1979–1980	Vila Nova	25	(2)
1981	Portuguesa	2	(0)
1982	Recife		
1983	Santa Cruz		
1983	Atlético Goianiense		
1984	Vila Nova		
1984	Catuense		
1985	Ferroviário		
1986	Marcílio Dias		
1987	Nacional-SP		
1987–1990	Ferroviário		
1989	→ Santa Cruz-RS (loan)		

International career
1975	Brazil	4	(3)
- * Club domestic league appearances and goals

Danival de Oliveira (born 5 November 1952), commonly known as Danival, is a retired Brazilian footballer who spent most of his career with Clube Atlético Mineiro.

== International career ==
All of Danival's caps and goals came in the 1975 Copa América, where he helped Brazil to third place.

== Career statistics ==
=== International ===
National team	Year	Apps	Goals
Brazil	1975	4	3
Total		4	3

=== International goals ===
Scores and results list Brazil's goal tally first.

No	Date	Venue	Opponent	Score	Result	Competition
1.	31 July 1975	Estadio Olímpico, Caracas, Venezuela	Venezuela	2–0	4–0	1975 Copa América
2.	13 August 1975	Mineirão, Belo Horizonte, Brazil	Venezuela	3–0	6–0	1975 Copa América
3.	16 August 1975	Estadio Gigante de Arroyito, Rosario, Santa Fe, Argentina	Argentina	1–0	1–0	1975 Copa América
