= Romeu Evangelista =

Brazilian footballer

Personal information
- Date of birth: 27 March 1950 (age 76)
- Place of birth: Esmeraldas, Brazil
- Position: Midfielder

Youth career
- 1968–1970: Atlético Mineiro

Senior career*
Years	Team	Apps	(Gls)
1971–1975	Atlético Mineiro	104	(20)
1975–1980	Corinthians	57	(9)
1981	Palmeiras	5	(0)
1981–1982	Millonarios	10	(2)
1983	Nacional Atlético		

International career
1975	Brazil	6	(1)
- * Club domestic league appearances and goals

Romeu Evangelista (born 27 March 1950), also known as Romeu Cambalhota, is a retired Brazilian footballer who spent most of his career with Clube Atlético Mineiro and Corinthians.

== International career ==
All of Romeu Evangelista's caps and only goal came in the 1975 Copa América, where he helped Brazil to third place.

== Career statistics ==
=== International ===
National team	Year	Apps	Goals
Brazil	1975	6	1
Total		6	1

=== International goals ===
Scores and results list Brazil's goal tally first.

No	Date	Venue	Opponent	Score	Result	Competition
1.	31 July 1975	Estadio Olímpico, Caracas, Venezuela	Venezuela	1–0	4–0	1975 Copa América
