= Roberto Batata =

Brazilian footballer (1949–1976)

Personal information
- Full name: Roberto Monteiro
- Date of birth: July 24, 1949
- Place of birth: Belo Horizonte, Brazil
- Date of death: May 13, 1976 (aged 26)
- Place of death: Belo Horizonte, Brazil
- Position: Forward

Youth career
- América-MG

Senior career*
Years	Team	Apps	(Gls)
1969–1976	Cruzeiro	90	(24)
1970–1971	→ Atlético de Três Corações (loan)		

International career
1975	Brazil	6	(3)
- * Club domestic league appearances and goals

Roberto Monteiro, commonly known by the nickname Roberto Batata (July 24, 1949 – May 13, 1976), was an association football forward who played for Campeonato Brasileiro Série A club Cruzeiro and for the Brazil national team.

== Nickname ==
Batata's nickname, meaning Roberto Potato, was given by the head coach João Crispim, because of his love for French fries (known in Brazil as batata frita).

== Club career ==
Born in Belo Horizonte, capital of the state of Minas Gerais, Roberto Batata started his professional career playing for América-MG, leaving the club to join Cruzeiro in 1969. Defending Cruzeiro, he won the Campeonato Mineiro in 1969, 1972, 1973, 1974 and in 1975, and the Copa Libertadores in 1976. He played 90 Série A games for his club, scoring 24 goals. Including other competition games, he played 281 games for Cruzeiro, and scored 110 goals.

== International career ==
Roberto Batata played six Copa América games in 1975, scoring three goals. His first game was played on July 31, against Venezuela. He scored his first two goals for the national team against that same country, on August 13. His third goal was scored on September 30, against Peru. His last game for the national team was played on October 4, against Peru.

== Death ==
Batata died on May 13, 1976, in Belo Horizonte, after a car crash at Rodovia Fernão Dias when he was traveling to Três Corações to visit his wife Denize and his eleven-month son Leonardo. The accident happened one day after he played his last game for Cruzeiro, in which he helped his team beat Alianza Lima of Peru 4–0, scoring one of the goals.

Roberto Batata is buried in Cemitério Bonfim - Belo Horizonte, Minas Gerais
