= Lula (footballer, born 1946) =

Brazilian footballer (1946–2022)

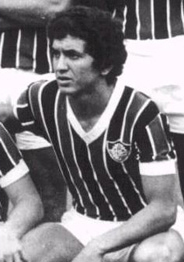

Personal information
- Full name: Luiz Ribeiro Pinto Neto
- Date of birth: 16 November 1946
- Place of birth: Arcoverde, Brazil
- Date of death: 11 February 2022 (aged 75)
- Position: Winger

Senior career*
Years	Team	Apps	(Gls)
1964	ABC		
1965–1967	Fluminense		
1967	Palmeiras		
1968–1974	Fluminense		
1974–1977	Internacional		
1977–1980	Sport		

International career
1971–1977	Brazil		

Managerial career
- 1982: Fluminense
- 1984: Ceará
- 1985: Sampaio Corrêa
- 1987: Itaperuna
- 1989: Al-Ta'ee
- 1994: Al-Ansar
- 1997: América
- 2001: Al-Ta'ee
- 2004–2005: Al-Fayha
- 2007: Ettifaq FC
- 2008: Dubai Club
- 2011: Hajer Club
- * Club domestic league appearances and goals

Luiz Ribeiro Pinto Neto (16 November 1946 – 11 February 2022), best known as Lula, was a Brazilian footballer who played as a winger and went on to become a manager. He died on 11 February 2022, at the age of 75.

== Honours ==
Palmeiras

- Taça Brasil: 1967

Fluminense

- Campeonato Carioca: 1969, 1971, 1973
- Taça de Prata: 1970

Internacional

- Campeonato Gaúcho: 1974, 1975, 1976
- Campeonato Brasileiro Série A: 1975, 1976

Individual

- Bola de Prata: 1974, 1976
