= Julio Meléndez =

Peruvian footballer (born 1942)

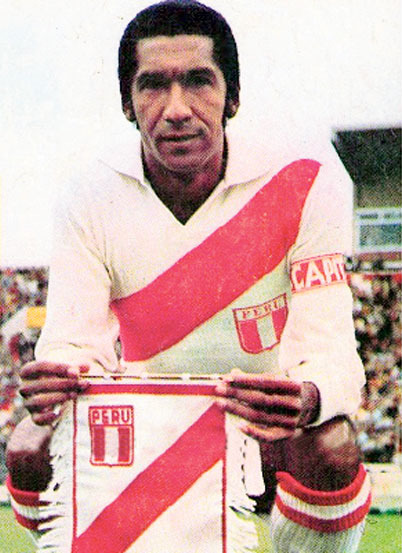
- Meléndez as captain of Peru

Personal information
- Full name: Julio Guillermo Meléndez Calderón
- Date of birth: April 11, 1942 (age 84)
- Place of birth: Lima, Peru
- Height: 1.85 m (6 ft 1 in)
- Position: Defender

Senior career*
Years	Team	Apps	(Gls)
1961–1962	Defensor Lima		
1963–1964	Sport Boys		
1965–1967	Defensor Arica		
1968–1972	Boca Juniors	146	(0)
1972	Defensor Lima		
1973	Atlético Chalaco		
1974	Unión Tumán		
1975–1977	Juan Aurich		

International career
1965–1977	Peru	35	(0)
- * Club domestic league appearances and goals

Julio Meléndez Calderón (born April 11, 1942 in Lima) is a retired Peruvian football defender.

== Career ==
Meléndez was one of South America's most recognized defenders of his time, and was a great success in Argentine football, to the point of being considered an all-time first team member at Boca Juniors.

Meléndez played a total of 156 games for Boca in all competitions.
