= 1975 Copa América =

Football competition

Tournament details
- Dates: 17 July – 28 October
- Teams: 10 (from 1 confederation)

Final positions
- Champions: Peru (2nd title)
- Runners-up: Colombia
- Third place: Uruguay; Brazil

Tournament statistics
- Matches played: 25
- Goals scored: 79 (3.16 per match)
- Attendance: 1,053,000 (42,120 per match)
- Top scorer(s): (Colombia) Ernesto Díaz (Argentina) Leopoldo Luque (4 goals each)
- Best player: (Peru) Teófilo Cubillas

The 1975 edition of the Copa América football tournament was played between 17 July and 28 October. The tournament saw many significant shifts to its format, such as changing its name from South American Championship to Copa América and altering from a round-robin tournament to incorporating a group stage, a knockout round, and a final. Additionally all ten CONMEBOL countries participated for the first time, with defending champions Uruguay receiving a bye into the semi-finals and the rest starting in the group stage. For this tournament there was also no fixed venue, and all matches were played throughout the year in each country.

== Squads ==
For a complete list of participating squads: see 1975 Copa América squads

== Group stage ==
The teams were drawn into three groups, consisting of three teams each. Each team played twice (home and away) against the other teams in their group, with two points for a win, one point for a draw, and no points for a loss. The winner of each group advanced to the semi-finals.

=== Group A ===
Team	Pld	W	D	L	GF	GA	GD	Pts
Brazil	4	4	0	0	13	1	+12	8
Argentina	4	2	0	2	17	4	+13	4
Venezuela	4	0	0	4	1	26	−25	0

31 July 1975

Venezuela	0–4	Brazil
	Report	Romeu 2'; Danival 50'; Palhinha 82', 88'

Estadio Olímpico, Caracas
Attendance: 20,000
Referee: Carlos Rivero (Peru)

3 August 1975

Venezuela	1–5	Argentina
Iriarte 14'		Luque 12', 34', 66'; Kempes 30'; Ardiles 86'

Estadio Olímpico, Caracas
Attendance: 15,000
Referee: Rafael Hormazábal (Chile)

6 August 1975

Brazil	2–1	Argentina
Nelinho 31', 55' (pen.)	Report	Asad 11'

Mineirão, Belo Horizonte
Attendance: 80,000
Referee: Ramón Barreto (Uruguay)

10 August 1975

Argentina	11–0	Venezuela
D. Killer 8', 41', 62'; Gallego 14'; Ardiles 39'; Kempes 53', 81'; Zanabria 56', 64'; Bóveda 80'; Luque 85'

Cor de León, Rosario
Attendance: 50,000
Referee: Pedro Reyes (Peru)

13 August 1975

Brazil	6–0	Venezuela
Roberto Batata 6', 79'; Nelinho 9'; Danival 37'; Campos 53'; Palhinha 65'	Report

Mineirão, Belo Horizonte
Attendance: 32,000
Referee: Carlos Rivero (Peru)

16 August 1975

Argentina	0–1	Brazil
	Report	Danival 45'

Cor de León, Rosario
Attendance: 50,000
Referee: Carlos Robles (Chile)

=== Group B ===
Team	Pld	W	D	L	GF	GA	GD	Pts
Peru	4	3	1	0	8	3	+5	7
Chile	4	1	1	2	7	6	+1	3
Bolivia	4	1	0	3	3	9	−6	2

17 July 1975

Chile	1–1	Peru
Crisosto 10'		Rojas 72'

Estadio Nacional, Santiago
Attendance: 50,000
Referee: Omar Delgado (Colombia)

20 July 1975

Bolivia	2–1	Chile
Mezza 60', 75'		Gamboa 41'

Estadio Jesús Bermúdez, Oruro
Attendance: 18,000
Referee: Héctor Ortiz (Paraguay)

27 July 1975

Bolivia	0–1	Peru
		Ramírez 17'

Estadio Jesús Bermúdez, Oruro
Attendance: 18,000
Referee: Alberto Ducatelli (Argentina)

7 August 1975

Peru	3–1	Bolivia
Ramírez 7' (pen.); Cueto 26'; Oblitas 52'		Mezza 58' (pen.)

Estadio Nacional, Lima
Attendance: 40,000
Referee: Romualdo Arppi Filho (Brazil)

13 August 1975

Chile	4–0	Bolivia
Araneda 40', 87'; Ahumada 61'; Gamboa 71'

Estadio Nacional, Santiago
Attendance: 15,000
Referee: Arturo Ithurralde (Argentina)

20 August 1975

Peru	3–1	Chile
Rojas 3'; Oblitas 32'; Cubillas 39'		Carlos Reinoso 76'

Estadio Alianza Lima, Lima
Attendance: 35,000
Referee: Juan José Fortunatto (Uruguay)

=== Group C ===
Team	Pld	W	D	L	GF	GA	GD	Pts
Colombia	4	4	0	0	7	1	+6	8
Paraguay	4	1	1	2	5	5	0	3
Ecuador	4	0	1	3	4	10	−6	1

20 July 1975

Colombia	1–0	Paraguay
Díaz 83'

Estadio El Campín, Bogotá
Attendance: 60,000
Referee: Romualdo Arppi Filho (Brazil)

24 July 1975

Ecuador	2–2	Paraguay
Lasso 38'; Castañeda 47'		Kiese 16', 87'

Estadio Modelo, Guayaquil
Attendance: 50,000
Referee: Mario Fiorenza (Venezuela)

27 July 1975

Ecuador	1–3	Colombia
Carrera 40'		Ortiz 15'; Retat 75'; Castro 83'

Estadio Olímpico Atahualpa, Quito
Attendance: 45,000
Referee: Miguel Angel Comesaña (Argentina)

30 July 1975

Paraguay	0–1	Colombia
		Díaz 40'

Defensores del Chaco, Asunción
Attendance: 50,000
Referee: Arnaldo Cézar Coelho (Brazil)
Match abandoned at 43'

7 August 1975

Colombia	2–0	Ecuador
Díaz 15'; Calero 42'

Estadio El Campín, Bogotá
Attendance: 50,000
Referee: Carlos Robles (Chile)

10 August 1975

Paraguay	3–1	Ecuador
Báez 21'; Rolón 39', 58'		Castañeda 31'

Defensores del Chaco, Asunción
Attendance: 10,000
Referee: Armando Marques (Brazil)

== Knockout stage ==
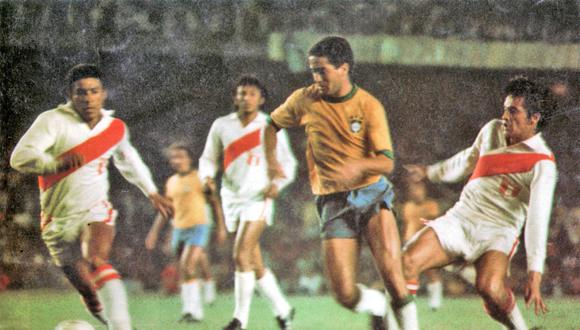
The first matchday between Peru and Brazil

Semi-finals
Colombia (agg.)	3	0
Uruguay	0	1
Brazil	1	2
Peru (by draw)	3	0

Finals
Colombia	1	0	0
Peru (replay)	0	2	1

=== Semi-finals ===
21 September 1975

Colombia	3–0	Uruguay
Angulo 53'; Ortiz 70'; Díaz 90'

Estadio El Campín, Bogotá
Attendance: 55,000
Referee: César Orozco (Peru)
1 October 1975

Uruguay	1–0	Colombia
Morena 17' (pen.)

Estadio Centenario, Montevideo
Attendance: 70,000
Referee: Rafael Hormazábal (Chile)

2–2 on points. Colombia won 3–1 on aggregate goals.

30 September 1975

Brazil	1–3	Peru
Roberto Batata 54'		Casaretto 19', 88'; Cubillas 82'

Estádio Mineirão, Belo Horizonte
Attendance: 75,000
Referee: Miguel Angel Comesaña (Argentina)
4 October 1975

Peru	0–2	Brazil
		Meléndez 10' (o.g.); Campos 61'

Estadio Alianza Lima, Lima
Attendance: 35,000
Referee: Arturo Ithurralde (Argentina)

2–2 on points. Peru won on a drawing of lots.

=== Finals ===
16 October 1975

Colombia	1–0	Peru
Castro 38'

Estadio El Campín, Bogotá
Attendance: 50,000
Referee: Miguel Comesaña (Argentina)
22 October 1975

Peru	2–0	Colombia
Oblitas 18'; Ramírez 44'

Estadio Nacional, Lima
Attendance: 50,000
Referee: Juan Silvagno (Chile)

2–2 on points. A play-off was played on a neutral ground to determine the winner.

28 October 1975

Peru	1–0	Colombia
Sotil 25'

Estadio Olimpico, Caracas
Attendance: 30,000
Referee: Ramón Barreto (Uruguay)

Peru won the play-off 1–0.

== Result ==
1975 Copa América champions

Peru
2nd title

== Goal scorers ==
With four goals, Leopoldo Luque and Ernesto Díaz are the top scorers in the tournament. In total, 79 goals were scored by 42 different players, with only one of them credited as an own goal.

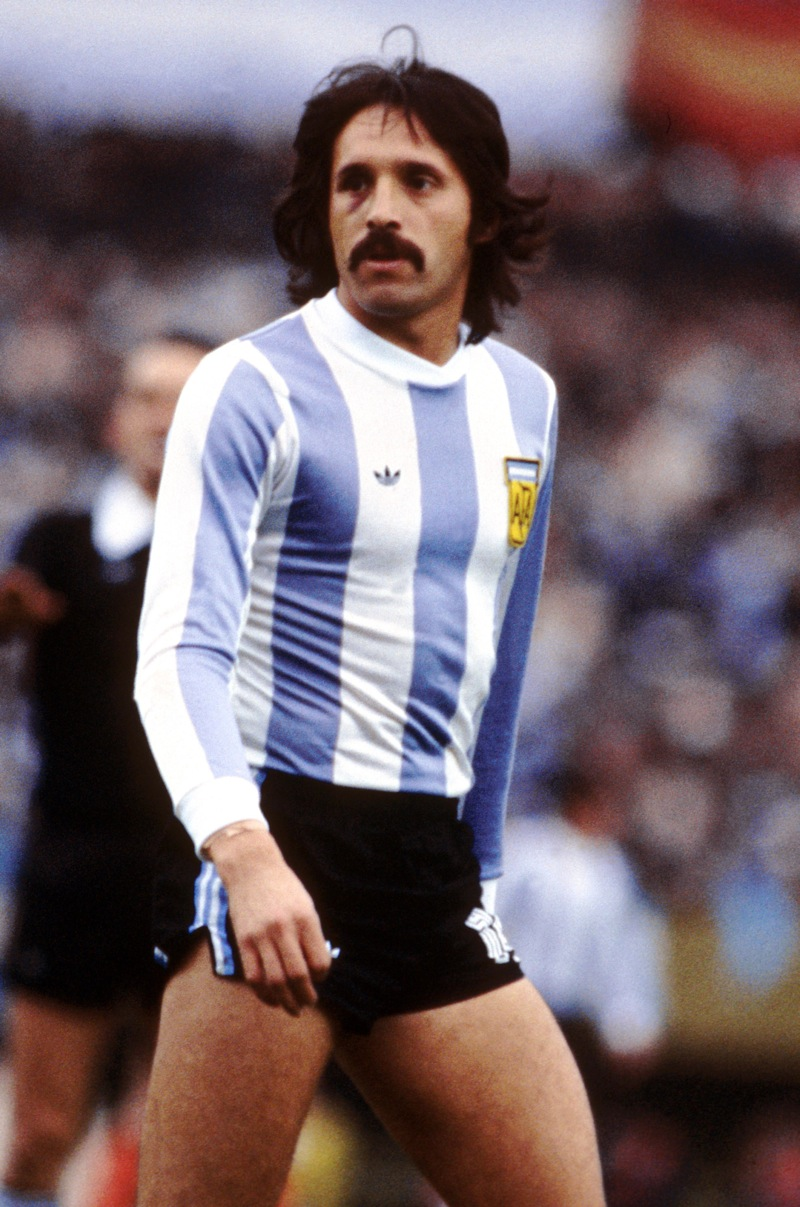
Leopoldo Luque, one of the two top scorers

4 goals

- (Argentina) Leopoldo Luque
- (Colombia) Ernesto Díaz

3 goals

- (Argentina) Mario Kempes
- (Argentina) Daniel Killer
- (Bolivia) Ovidio Mezza
- (Brazil) Danival
- (Brazil) Nelinho
- (Brazil) Palhinha
- (Brazil) Roberto Batata
- (Peru) Juan Carlos Oblitas
- (Peru) Oswaldo Ramírez

2 goals

- (Argentina) Osvaldo Ardiles
- (Argentina) Mario Zanabria
- (Brazil) Campos
- (Chile) Luis Araneda
- (Chile) Miguel Ángel Gamboa
- (Colombia) Ponciano Castro
- (Colombia) Willington Ortiz
- (Ecuador) Gonzalo Castañeda
- (Paraguay) Hugo Enrique Kiese
- (Paraguay) Clemente Rolón
- (Peru) Enrique Casaretto
- (Peru) Teófilo Cubillas
- (Peru) Percy Rojas

1 goal

- (Argentina) Julio Asad
- (Argentina) Ramón Bóveda
- (Argentina) Américo Gallego
- (Brazil) Romeu
- (Chile) Sergio Ahumada
- (Chile) Julio Crisosto
- (Chile) Carlos Reinoso
- (Colombia) Edgar Angulo
- (Colombia) Oswaldo Calero
- (Colombia) Eduardo Retat
- (Ecuador) Polo Carrera
- (Ecuador) Félix Lasso
- (Paraguay) Carlos Báez
- (Peru) César Cueto
- (Peru) Hugo Sotil
- (Uruguay) Fernando Morena
- (Venezuela) Ramón Iriarte

Own goal

- (Peru) Julio Meléndez (for Brazil)
