= Ecuador national football team results (1938–1979) =

This page details the match results and statistics of the Ecuador national football team from 1938 to 1979.

== Key ==
Key to matches

- Att.=Match attendance
- (H)=Home ground
- (A)=Away ground
- (N)=Neutral ground

Key to record by opponent

- Pld=Games played
- W=Games won
- D=Games drawn
- L=Games lost
- GF=Goals for
- GA=Goals against

== Results ==
Ecuador's score is shown first in each case.

No.	Date	Venue	Opponents	Score	Competition	Ecuador scorers	Att.	Ref.
1	8 August 1938	Estadio Universitario, Bogotá (N)	Bolivia	1–1	1938 Bolivarian Games	Unknown	–	
2	10 August 1938	Estadio Universitario, Bogotá (N)	Colombia	2–1	1938 Bolivarian Games	Freire, Herrera	–	
3	11 August 1938	Estadio Universitario, Bogotá (N)	Peru	1–9	1938 Bolivarian Games	Suárez Rizzo	–	
4	19 August 1938	Estadio Universitario, Bogotá (N)	Venezuela	5–2	1938 Bolivarian Games	Castillo (o.g.), Suárez Rizzo, Arenas, Herrera, Freire	–	
5	22 August 1938	Estadio Universitario, Bogotá (N)	Bolivia	1–2	1938 Bolivarian Games	Zambrano	–	
6	15 January 1939	Original Estadio Nacional, Lima (N)	Peru	2–5	1939 South American Championship	Alcívar (2)	10,000	
7	22 January 1939	Original Estadio Nacional, Lima (N)	Uruguay	0–6	1939 South American Championship		10,000	
8	5 February 1939	Original Estadio Nacional, Lima (N)	Chile	1–4	1939 South American Championship	Arenas	10,000	
9	12 February 1939	Original Estadio Nacional, Lima (N)	Paraguay	1–3	1939 South American Championship	Arenas	15,000	
10	2 February 1939	Estadio Nacional, Santiago (N)	Chile	0–5	1941 South American Championship		40,000	
11	9 February 1939	Estadio Nacional, Santiago (N)	Uruguay	0–6	1941 South American Championship		70,000	
12	16 February 1939	Estadio Nacional, Santiago (N)	Argentina	1–6	1941 South American Championship	Freire	70,000	
13	23 February 1939	Estadio Nacional, Santiago (N)	Peru	0–4	1941 South American Championship		48,000	
14	18 January 1942	Estadio Centenario, Montevideo (N)	Uruguay	0–7	1942 South American Championship		45,000	
15	22 January 1942	Estadio Centenario, Montevideo (N)	Argentina	0–12	1942 South American Championship		25,000	
16	25 January 1942	Estadio Centenario, Montevideo (N)	Paraguay	1–3	1942 South American Championship	Jiménez	12,000	
17	28 January 1942	Estadio Centenario, Montevideo (N)	Peru	1–2	1942 South American Championship	Jiménez	40,000	
18	31 January 1942	Estadio Centenario, Montevideo (N)	Brazil	1–5	1942 South American Championship	Alvarez	40,000	
19	5 February 1942	Estadio Centenario, Montevideo (N)	Chile	1–2	1942 South American Championship	Alcívar	15,000	
20	14 January 1945	Estadio Nacional, Santiago (N)	Chile	3–6	1945 South American Championship	Raymondi Chávez, Jiménez, L. Mendoza	65,000	
21	24 January 1945	Estadio Nacional, Santiago (N)	Uruguay	1–5	1945 South American Championship	Aguayo	70,000	
22	31 January 1945	Estadio Nacional, Santiago (N)	Argentina	2–4	1945 South American Championship	Aguayo, J. L. Mendoza	60,000	
23	11 February 1945	Estadio Nacional, Santiago (N)	Bolivia	0–0	1945 South American Championship		70,000	
24	18 February 1945	Estadio Nacional, Santiago (N)	Colombia	1–3	1945 South American Championship	Aguayo	65,000	
25	21 February 1945	Estadio Nacional, Santiago (N)	Brazil	2–9	1945 South American Championship	Aguayo, Albornoz	22,000	
26	30 November 1947	Estadio George Capwell, Guayaquil (N)	Bolivia	2–2	1947 South American Championship	Jiménez (2)	30,000	
27	4 December 1947	Estadio George Capwell, Guayaquil (N)	Colombia	0–0	1947 South American Championship		30,000	
28	11 December 1947	Estadio George Capwell, Guayaquil (N)	Chile	0–3	1947 South American Championship		22,000	
29	16 December 1947	Estadio George Capwell, Guayaquil (N)	Uruguay	1–6	1947 South American Championship	Garnica	30,000	
30	20 December 1947	Estadio George Capwell, Guayaquil (N)	Peru	0–0	1947 South American Championship		20,000	
31	25 December 1947	Estadio George Capwell, Guayaquil (N)	Argentina	0–2	1947 South American Championship		25,000	
32	30 December 1947	Estadio George Capwell, Guayaquil (N)	Paraguay	0–4	1947 South American Championship		5,000	
33	3 April 1949	Estádio São Januário, Rio de Janeiro (N)	Brazil	1–9	1949 South American Championship	Chuchuca	70,000	
34	10 April 1949	Estádio São Januário, Rio de Janeiro (N)	Paraguay	0–1	1949 South American Championship		15,000	
35	13 April 1949	Estádio São Januário, Rio de Janeiro (N)	Uruguay	2–3	1949 South American Championship	Arteaga, Vargas	30,000	
36	17 April 1949	Estádio São Januário, Rio de Janeiro (N)	Chile	0–1	1949 South American Championship		8,000	
37	20 April 1949	Estádio São Januário, Rio de Janeiro (N)	Peru	0–4	1949 South American Championship		7,000	
38	25 April 1949	Pacaembu Stadium, São Paulo (N)	Bolivia	0–2	1949 South American Championship		14,000	
39	3 May 1949	Estádio São Januário, Rio de Janeiro (N)	Colombia	4–1	1949 South American Championship	Cantos, Vargas, Andrade, Maldonado	3,000	
40	28 February 1953	Estadio Nacional, Lima (N)	Peru	0–1	1953 South American Championship		50,000	
41	4 March 1953	Estadio Nacional, Lima (N)	Paraguay	0–0	1953 South American Championship		45,000	
42	8 March 1953	Estadio Nacional, Lima (N)	Bolivia	1–1	1953 South American Championship	Guzmán	45,000	
43	12 March 1953	Estadio Nacional, Lima (N)	Brazil	0–2	1953 South American Championship		35,000	
44	19 March 1953	Estadio Nacional, Lima (N)	Chile	0–3	1953 South American Championship		55,000	
45	23 March 1953	Estadio Nacional, Lima (N)	Uruguay	0–6	1953 South American Championship		35,000	
46	27 February 1955	Estadio Nacional, Santiago (N)	Chile	1–7	1955 South American Championship	Villacreses	40,000	
47	9 March 1955	Estadio Nacional, Santiago (N)	Argentina	0–4	1955 South American Championship		40,000	
48	13 March 1955	Estadio Nacional, Santiago (N)	Peru	2–4	1955 South American Championship	Matute (2)	50,000	
49	16 March 1955	Estadio Nacional, Santiago (N)	Paraguay	0–2	1955 South American Championship		35,000	
50	23 March 1955	Estadio Nacional, Santiago (N)	Uruguay	1–5	1955 South American Championship	Matute	25,000	
51	7 March 1957	Estadio Nacional, Lima (N)	Uruguay	2–5	1957 South American Championship	Larraz (2)	50,000	
52	10 March 1957	Estadio Nacional, Lima (N)	Peru	1–2	1957 South American Championship	Cantos	55,000	
53	17 March 1957	Estadio Nacional, Lima (N)	Argentina	0–3	1957 South American Championship		50,000	
54	21 March 1957	Estadio Nacional, Lima (N)	Brazil	1–7	1957 South American Championship	Larraz	45,000	
55	24 March 1957	Estadio Nacional, Lima (N)	Chile	2–2	1957 South American Championship	Larraz, Cantos	45,000	
56	1 April 1957	Estadio Nacional, Lima (N)	Colombia	1–4	1957 South American Championship	Larraz	40,000	
57	6 December 1959	Estadio Modelo, Guayaquil (N)	Uruguay	0–4	Second 1959 South American Championship		55,000	
58	12 December 1959	Estadio Modelo, Guayaquil (N)	Argentina	1–1	Second 1959 South American Championship	Raffo	55,000	
59	19 December 1959	Estadio Modelo, Guayaquil (N)	Brazil	1–3	Second 1959 South American Championship	Raffo	55,000	
60	25 December 1959	Estadio Modelo, Guayaquil (N)	Paraguay	3–1	Second 1959 South American Championship	Spencer, Balseca	55,000	
61	27 December 1959	Estadio Modelo, Guayaquil (H)	Brazil	1–2	Friendly	Balseca	–	
62	4 December 1960	Estadio Modelo, Guayaquil (H)	Argentina	3–6	1962 FIFA World Cup qualification	Spencer, Raffo (2)	60,000	
63	17 December 1960	Boca Juniors Stadium, Buenos Aires (A)	Argentina	0–5	1962 FIFA World Cup qualification		50,000	
64	10 March 1963	Estadio Hernando Siles, La Paz (N)	Bolivia	4–4	1963 South American Championship	Raffo, Raymondi (2), Bolaños	15,000	
65	14 March 1963	Estadio Hernando Siles, La Paz (N)	Paraguay	1–3	1963 South American Championship	Raffo	15,000	
66	17 March 1963	Estadio Hernando Siles, La Paz (N)	Peru	1–2	1963 South American Championship	Raffo	8,000	
67	20 March 1963	Estadio Félix Capriles, Cochabamba (N)	Argentina	2–4	1963 South American Championship	Pineda, Palacios	20,000	
68	27 March 1963	Estadio Félix Capriles, Cochabamba (N)	Brazil	2–2	1963 South American Championship	Azón, Raffo	20,000	
69	31 March 1963	Estadio Hernando Siles, La Paz (N)	Colombia	4–3	1963 South American Championship	Raymondi, Raffo (2), Bolaños	15,000	
70	20 July 1965	Romelio Martínez Stadium, Barranquilla (A)	Colombia	1–0	1966 FIFA World Cup qualification	Muñoz	10,175	
71	25 July 1965	Estadio Modelo, Guayaquil (H)	Colombia	2–0	1966 FIFA World Cup qualification	Raymondi (2)	48,475	
72	15 August 1965	Estadio Modelo, Guayaquil (H)	Chile	2–2	1966 FIFA World Cup qualification	Spencer, Raymondi	50,041	
73	22 August 1965	Estadio Nacional, Santiago (A)	Chile	1–3	1966 FIFA World Cup qualification	Spencer	70,602	
74	12 October 1965	Estadio Nacional, Lima (N)	Chile	1–2	1966 FIFA World Cup qualification play-off	Gómez	44,864	
75	21 December 1966	Estadio Modelo, Guayaquil (H)	Paraguay	2–2	1967 South American Championship qualification	Carrera, Muñoz	47,000	
76	28 December 1966	Estadio Manuel Ferreira, Asunción (A)	Paraguay	1–3	1967 South American Championship qualification	Muñoz	25,000	
77	22 June 1969	Estadio Modelo, Guayaquil (H)	Colombia	4–1	Friendly	Lasso (2), Muñoz (2)	15,000	
78	6 July 1969	Estadio Modelo, Guayaquil (H)	Uruguay	0–2	1970 FIFA World Cup qualification		55,783	
79	20 July 1969	Estadio Centenario, Montevideo (A)	Uruguay	0–1	1970 FIFA World Cup qualification		39,387	
80	27 July 1969	Estadio Nacional, Santiago (A)	Chile	1–4	1970 FIFA World Cup qualification	Macías	68,857	
81	3 August 1969	Estadio Modelo, Guayaquil (H)	Chile	1–1	1970 FIFA World Cup qualification	Rodríguez	11,565	
82	24 May 1970	Estadio Olímpico Atahualpa, Quito (H)	England	0–2	Friendly		36,000	
83	11 June 1972	Machadão, Natal (N)	Portugal	0–3	Brazil Independence Cup		–	
84	14 June 1972	Machadão, Natal (N)	Chile	1–2	Brazil Independence Cup	Lasso	–	
85	18 June 1972	Machadão, Natal (N)	Republic of Ireland	2–3	Brazil Independence Cup	Coronel, Lasso	–	
86	21 June 1972	Estádio do Arruda, Recife (N)	Iran	1–1	Brazil Independence Cup	Lasso	–	
87	18 February 1973	Estadio Olímpico Atahualpa, Quito (H)	East Germany	1–1	Friendly	Tapia	40,000	
88	24 April 1973	Guayaquil (H)	Chile	1–1	Friendly	Guime	–	
89	29 April 1973	Estadio Hernando Siles, La Paz (A)	Bolivia	3–3	Friendly	Estupiñán (2), Guime	–	
90	6 May 1973	Quito (H)	Bolivia	0–0	Friendly		–	
91	12 May 1973	Port-au-Prince (A)	Haiti	2–1	Friendly	Mantilla, Estupiñán	–	
92	15 May 1973	Port-au-Prince (A)	Haiti	0–1	Friendly		–	
93	21 June 1973	Estadio El Campín, Bogotá (A)	Colombia	1–1	1974 FIFA World Cup qualification	Muñoz	43,497	
94	28 June 1973	Estadio Modelo, Guayaquil (H)	Colombia	1–1	1974 FIFA World Cup qualification	Muñoz	46,979	
95	1 July 1973	Quito (H)	Uruguay	1–2	1974 FIFA World Cup qualification	Estupiñán	43,075	
96	8 July 1973	Estadio Centenario, Montevideo (A)	Uruguay	0–4	1974 FIFA World Cup qualification		33,033	
97	22 June 1975	Quito (H)	Peru	6–0	Friendly	Paz (2), Castañeda, Lasso, Carrera (2)	–	
98	25 June 1975	Guayaquil (H)	Peru	1–0	Friendly	C. Ron	–	
99	1 July 1975	Lima (A)	Peru	0–2	Friendly		–	
100	9 July 1975	Cochabamba (A)	Bolivia	0–1	Friendly		–	
101	24 July 1975	Estadio Modelo, Guayaquil (H)	Paraguay	2–2	1975 Copa América	Lasso, Castañeda	50,000	
102	27 July 1975	Estadio Olímpico Atahualpa, Quito (H)	Colombia	1–3	1975 Copa América	Carrera	45,000	
103	7 August 1975	Estadio El Campín, Bogotá (A)	Colombia	0–2	1975 Copa América		50,000	
104	10 August 1975	Estadio Defensores del Chaco, Asunción (A)	Paraguay	1–3	1975 Copa América	Castañeda	10,000	
105	20 October 1976	Guayaquil (H)	Uruguay	2–2	Friendly	Villafuerte, Liciardi	–	
106	4 January 1977	Estadio Centenario, Montevideo (A)	Uruguay	1–1	Friendly	Liciardi	–	
107	9 January 1977	Asunción (A)	Paraguay	0–2	Friendly		–	
108	16 January 1977	Estadio El Campín, Bogotá (A)	Colombia	1–0	Friendly	Liciardi	50,000	
109	20 January 1977	Acarigua (A)	Venezuela	0–1	Friendly		–	
110	26 January 1977	Quito (H)	Colombia	4–1	Friendly	Villafuerte, Liciardi (2), V. Ron	–	
111	13 February 1977	Quito (H)	Paraguay	2–1	Friendly	Liciardi (2)	–	
112	20 February 1977	Estadio Olímpico Atahualpa, Quito (H)	Peru	1–1	1978 FIFA World Cup qualification	Paz	39,576	
113	27 February 1977	Estadio Modelo, Guayaquil (H)	Chile	0–1	1978 FIFA World Cup qualification		51,200	
114	12 March 1977	Estadio Nacional, Lima (A)	Peru	0–4	1978 FIFA World Cup qualification		43,319	
115	20 March 1977	Estadio Nacional, Santiago (A)	Chile	0–3	1978 FIFA World Cup qualification		15,571	
116	13 June 1979	Santiago (A)	Chile	0–0	Friendly		–	
117	21 June 1979	Estadio Modelo, Guayaquil (H)	Chile	2–1	Friendly	Torres, V. Ron	–	
118	11 July 1979	Lima (A)	Peru	1–2	Friendly	Mantilla	–	
119	8 August 1979	Quito (H)	Peru	2–1	Friendly	Alarcón, Perlaza	–	
120	29 August 1979	Estadio Olímpico Atahualpa, Quito (H)	Paraguay	1–2	1979 Copa América	Torres	45,000	
121	5 September 1979	Estadio Olímpico Atahualpa, Quito (H)	Uruguay	2–1	1979 Copa América	Tenorio, Alarcón	30,000	
122	13 September 1979	Estadio Defensores del Chaco, Asunción (A)	Paraguay	0–2	1979 Copa América		25,000	
123	16 September 1979	Estadio Centenario, Montevideo (A)	Uruguay	1–2	1979 Copa América	Klinger	25,000	

== Record by opponent ==
Team	Pld	W	D	L	GF	GA	GD	WPCT
Argentina	10	0	1	9	9	48	−39	0.00
Bolivia	10	0	7	3	12	16	−4	0.00
Brazil	8	0	1	7	9	39	−30	0.00
Chile	20	1	5	14	18	53	−35	5.00
Colombia	15	8	3	4	27	21	+6	53.33
East Germany	1	0	1	0	1	1	0	0.00
England	1	0	0	1	0	2	−2	0.00
Haiti	2	1	0	1	2	2	0	50.00
Iran	1	0	1	0	1	1	0	0.00
Paraguay	16	2	3	11	15	34	−19	12.50
Peru	17	3	2	12	19	43	−24	17.65
Portugal	1	0	0	1	0	3	−3	0.00
Republic of Ireland	1	0	0	1	2	3	−1	0.00
Uruguay	18	1	2	15	14	68	−54	5.56
Venezuela	2	1	0	1	5	3	+2	50.00
Total	123	17	26	80	134	337	−203	13.82

Source: Results
