= 1963 São Paulo FC season =

São Paulo
1963 season
- Chairman: Laudo Natel
- Manager: Osvaldo Brandão
- Torneio Rio-São Paulo: 8th
- Campeonato Paulista: Runners-up

The 1963 football season was São Paulo's 34th season since club's existence.

== Statistics ==
=== Overall ===
Games played	57 (9 Torneio Rio-São Paulo, 30 Campeonato Paulista, 18 Friendly match)
Games won	37 (3 Torneio Rio-São Paulo, 18 Campeonato Paulista, 16 Friendly match)
Games drawn	11 (2 Torneio Rio-São Paulo, 8 Campeonato Paulista, 1 Friendly match)
Games lost	9 (4 Torneio Rio-São Paulo, 4 Campeonato Paulista, 1 Friendly match)
Goals scored	118
Goals conceded	63
Goal difference	+55
Best result	7–2 (A) v Nacional - Friendly match - 1963.04.28
Worst result	2–6 (A) v Santos - Torneio Rio-São Paulo - 1963.03.07
Most appearances	
Top scorer	

Source: São Paulo FC

== Friendlies ==
January 12 International	São Paulo (São Paulo (state))	4–0	(São Paulo (state)) São Paulo FC	São Paulo
	Davi 16', 48'; Batista 24'; Paulo Bim 81'	Report		Stadium: Estadio do Pacaembu; Referee: José Batista dos Santos (BRA)

January 16 International	Sporting Cristal (Peru)	1–3	(Brazil) São Paulo	Lima
	Goal		Faustino; Prado; Baiano	Stadium: Estadio Nacional

January 19 International	Alianza Lima (Peru)	1–2	(Brazil) São Paulo	Lima
	Goal		De la Vega o.g.' Nondas	Stadium: Estadio Nacional

January 23 International	Deportivo Municipal (Peru)	1–3	(Brazil) São Paulo	Lima
	Goal		Nondas; Sérgio Lopes	Stadium: Estadio Nacional

January 27 International	Atlético Grau (Peru)	1–3	(Brazil) São Paulo	Piura
	Goal		Dati; Agenor; Cido

January 29 International	Peñarol (Uruguay)	3–5	(Brazil) São Paulo	Montevideo
	Goal		Prado; Dati; Nondas; Baiano	Stadium: Estadio Centenario

February 10 National	São Paulo	4–0	Taubaté	São Paulo
	Sabino; Faustino; Nondas; Roberto Dias			Stadium: Estádio Cícero Pompeu de Toledo (Morumbi)

April 21 National	Estrada de Ferro Sorocabana	4–6	São Paulo	Sorocaba
	Goal		Goal	Stadium: Estádio Rui da Costa Aguiar

April 28 Copa Club Nacional	Nacional (Paraguay)	2–7	(Brazil) São Paulo	Asunción
	Goal		Goal	Stadium: Puerto Sajonia

May 23 National	Ponte Preta	1–4	São Paulo	Campinas
	Goal		Goal	Stadium: Estádio Moisés Lucarelli

June 2 National	São Paulo	2–1	Corinthians	São Paulo
	Goal		Goal	Stadium: Estádio Cícero Pompeu de Toledo (Morumbi)

June 5 National	Nacional	1–2	São Paulo	São Paulo
	Goal		Goal	Stadium: Estádio Nicolau Alayon (Comendador Souza)

June 12 National	Internacional	0–1	São Paulo	Limeira
			Goal

August 25 International	Santa Fe (Colombia)	3–2	(Brazil) São Paulo	Bogotá
	Goal		Goal	Stadium: Estadio Nemesio Camacho (El Campín)

September 22 National	Goiânia	0–2	São Paulo	Goiânia
			Goal

December 7 National	Londrina	0–1	São Paulo	Londrina
			Goal	Stadium: Estádio Vitorino Golçalves Dias

=== Pequeña Copa del Mundo de Clubes 1963 ===
August 18 International	Porto (Portugal)	1–2	(Brazil) São Paulo	Caracas
	Goal		Goal	Stadium: Estadio Universitario

August 23 International	Real Madrid (Spain)	1–2	(Brazil) São Paulo	Caracas
	Goal		Goal	Stadium: Estadio Universitario

August 28 International	Real Madrid (Spain)	0–0	(Brazil) São Paulo	Caracas
				Stadium: Estadio Universitario

== Official competitions ==
=== Torneio-Rio São Paulo ===
February 13 Round 1	São Paulo	2–1	Palmeiras	São Paulo
	Goal		Goal	Stadium: Estádio Paulo Machado de Carvalho (Pacaembu)

February 17 Round 2	Flamengo	2–0	São Paulo	Rio de Janeiro
	Goal			Stadium: Estádio Jornalista Mário Filho (Maracanã)

March 2 Round 3	São Paulo	1–1	Portuguesa	São Paulo
	Goal		Goal	Stadium: Estádio Paulo Machado de Carvalho (Pacaembu)

March 7 Round 4	Santos	6–2	São Paulo	São Paulo
	Goal		Goal	Stadium: Estádio Paulo Machado de Carvalho (Pacaembu)

March 10 Round 5	São Paulo	2–1	Olaria	São Paulo
	Goal		Goal	Stadium: Estádio Paulo Machado de Carvalho (Pacaembu)

March 14 Round 6	São Paulo	2–1	Corinthians	São Paulo
	Goal		Goal	Stadium: Estádio Paulo Machado de Carvalho (Pacaembu)

March 17 Round 7	São Paulo	0–1	Vasco da Gama	São Paulo
			Goal	Stadium: Estádio Paulo Machado de Carvalho (Pacaembu)

March 23 Round 8	Botafogo	1–1	São Paulo	Rio de Janeiro
	Goal		Goal	Stadium: Estádio Jornalista Mário Filho (Maracanã)

March 30 Round 9	Fluminense	2–1	São Paulo	Rio de Janeiro
	Goal		Goal	Stadium: Estádio Jornalista Mário Filho (Maracanã)

==== Record ====
Final Position	Points	Matches	Wins	Draws	Losses	Goals For	Goals Away	Win%
8th	8	9	3	2	4	11	16	44%

=== Campeonato Paulista ===
June 16 Round 1	São Paulo	4–0	Noroeste	São Paulo
	Goal			Stadium: Estádio Cícero Pompeu de Toledo (Morumbi)

June 23 Round 2	São Paulo	1–1	Juventus	São Paulo
	Goal		Goal	Stadium: Estádio Cícero Pompeu de Toledo (Morumbi)

June 30 Round 3	São Paulo	2–0	São Bento	São Paulo
	Goal			Stadium: Estádio Cícero Pompeu de Toledo (Morumbi)

July 7 Round 4	Ferroviária	0–1	São Paulo	Araraquara
			Goal	Stadium: Estádio Doutor Adhemar de Barros (Fonte Luminosa)

July 14 Round 5	Esportiva	1–1	São Paulo	Guaratinguetá
	Goal		Goal	Stadium: Estádio Benedito Meirelles

July 21 Round 6	Guarani	2–0	São Paulo	Campinas
	Goal			Stadium: Estádio Brinco de Ouro da Princesa

July 27 Round 7	São Paulo	4–0	Prudentina	São Paulo
	Goal			Stadium: Estádio Paulo Machado de Carvalho (Pacaembu)

August 4 Round 8	Corinthians	3–0	São Paulo	São Paulo
	Goal			Stadium: Estádio Cícero Pompeu de Toledo (Morumbi)

August 11 Round 9	Comercial	0–2	São Paulo	Ribeirão Preto
			Goal	Stadium: Estádio Costa Coelho

August 15 Round 10	Santos	1–4	São Paulo	São Paulo
	Goal		Goal	Stadium: Estádio Paulo Machado de Carvalho (Pacaembu)

September 1 Round 11	São Paulo	2–1	Botafogo	São Paulo
	Goal		Goal	Stadium: Estádio Paulo Machado de Carvalho (Pacaembu)

September 8 Round 12	Jabaquara	1–2	São Paulo	Santos
	Goal		Goal	Stadium: Estádio Urbano Caldeira (Vila Belmiro)

September 11 Round 13	Portuguesa	1–1	São Paulo	São Paulo
	Goal		Goal	Stadium: Estádio Paulo Machado de Carvalho (Pacaembu)

September 14 Round 14	São Paulo	1–1	XV de Piracicaba	São Paulo
	Goal		Goal	Stadium: Estádio Paulo Machado de Carvalho (Pacaembu)

September 25 Round 15	São Paulo	3–1	Palmeiras	São Paulo
	Goal		Goal	Stadium: Estádio Paulo Machado de Carvalho (Pacaembu)

September 29 Round 16	São Paulo	5–2	Jabaquara	São Paulo
	Goal		Goal	Stadium: Estádio Cícero Pompeu de Toledo (Morumbi)

October 6 Round 17	Botafogo	2–3	São Paulo	Ribeirão Preto
	Goal		Goal	Stadium: Estádio Luis Pereira

October 23 Round 18	São Paulo	2–1	Guarani	São Paulo
	Goal		Goal	Stadium: Estádio Paulo Machado de Carvalho (Pacaembu)

October 27 Round 19	XV de Piracicaba	0–1	São Paulo	Piracicaba
			Goal	Stadium: Estádio Roberto Gomes Pedroza

October 31 Round 20	São Paulo	4–1	Comercial	São Paulo
	Goal		Goal	Stadium: Estádio Paulo Machado de Carvalho (Pacaembu)

November 3 Round 21	Prudentina	0–1	São Paulo	Presidente Prudente
			Goal	Stadium: Estádio Félix Ribeiro Marcondes

November 10 Round 22	Noroeste	2–2	São Paulo	Bauru
	Goal		Goal	Stadium: Estádio Ubaldo Medeiros

November 13 Round 23	São Paulo	1–0	Portuguesa	São Paulo
	Goal			Stadium: Estádio Paulo Machado de Carvalho (Pacaembu)

November 17 Round 24	Corinthians	1–0	São Paulo	São Paulo
	Goal			Stadium: Estádio Paulo Machado de Carvalho (Pacaembu)

November 21 Round 25	Juventus	0–0	São Paulo	São Paulo
				Stadium: Estádio Paulo Machado de Carvalho (Pacaembu)

November 24 Round 26	São Paulo	3–1	Esportiva	São Paulo
	Goal		Goal	Stadium: Estádio Paulo Machado de Carvalho (Pacaembu)

November 27 Round 27	Santos	1–1	São Paulo	São Paulo
	Goal		Goal	Stadium: Estádio Paulo Machado de Carvalho (Pacaembu)

December 1 Round 28	São Bento	0–0	São Paulo	Sorocaba
				Stadium: Campo da Rua Coronel Nogueira Padilha

December 12 Round 29	São Paulo	5–1	Ferroviária	São Paulo
	Goal		Goal	Stadium: Estádio Paulo Machado de Carvalho (Pacaembu)

December 17 Round 30	Palmeiras	1–0	São Paulo	São Paulo
	Goal			Stadium: Estádio Paulo Machado de Carvalho (Pacaembu)

==== Record ====
Final Position	Points	Matches	Wins	Draws	Losses	Goals For	Goals Away	Win%
2nd	44	30	18	8	4	56	26	73%
