= 1966 FIFA World Cup qualification (CONMEBOL) =

Tournament details
- Dates: 16 May – 29 August 1965
- Teams: 9 (from 1 confederation)

Tournament statistics
- Matches played: 18
- Goals scored: 61 (3.39 per match)
- Attendance: 659,802 (36,656 per match)
- Top scorer: (Uruguay) Héctor Silva (5 goals)

The 9 teams were divided into 3 groups of 3 teams each. The teams played against each other on a home-and-away basis. The group winners would qualify. Brazil did not participate, as they were granted a spot in the finals for winning the 1962 FIFA World Cup.

== Group 1 ==
Pos	Team	Pld	W	D	L	GF	GA	GD	Pts	Qualification
1	Uruguay	4	4	0	0	11	2	+9	8	Qualification for 1966 FIFA World Cup
2	Peru	4	2	0	2	8	6	+2	4	
3	Venezuela	4	0	0	4	4	15	−11	0	

Source: AllWorldCup
Rules for classification: Tiebreakers
16 May 1965

Peru	1–0	Venezuela
Zegarra 37' (pen.)	Report

Lima, Peru
Attendance: 43,990
Referee: Adolfo Reginato (Chile)

23 May 1965

Uruguay	5–0	Venezuela
Rocha 18'; Silva 23', 52', 69'; Meneses 61'	Report

Montevideo, Uruguay
Attendance: 16,439
Referee: José Dimas Larrosa (Paraguay)

30 May 1965

Venezuela	1–3	Uruguay
Tortolero 40'	Report	Rocha 10', 47'; Silva 88'

Caracas, Venezuela
Attendance: 12,649
Referee: Roberto Goicoechea (Argentina)

2 June 1965

Venezuela	3–6	Peru
Santana 32'; Ravelo 46'; Elie 89'	Report	Mosquera 11'; León 44', 60', 68'; Zavala 40', 81'

Caracas, Venezuela
Attendance: 6,245
Referee: José Antonio Sundheim (Colombia)

6 June 1965

Peru	0–1	Uruguay
	Report	Urruzmendi 77'

Lima, Peru
Attendance: 44,033
Referee: Claudio Vicuña (Chile)

13 June 1965

Uruguay	2–1	Peru
Silva 20'; Rocha 62'	Report	Uribe 2'

Montevideo, Uruguay
Attendance: 58,413
Referee: Armando Marques (Brazil)

Uruguay qualified.

== Group 2 ==
Pos	Team	Pld	W	D	L	GF	GA	GD	Pts	Qualification
1	Chile	4	2	1	1	12	7	+5	5	Advance to play-off
2	Ecuador	4	2	1	1	6	5	+1	5	Advance to play-off
3	Colombia	4	1	0	3	4	10	−6	2	

Source: AllWorldCup
Rules for classification: Tiebreakers
20 July 1965

Colombia	0–1	Ecuador
	Report	Muñoz 18'

Barranquilla, Colombia
Attendance: 10,175
Referee: Enrique Montes Pedraza (Peru)

25 July 1965

Ecuador	2–0	Colombia
Raymondi 56', 77'	Report

Guayaquil, Ecuador
Attendance: 48,457
Referee: Luis Pedro Spinetto (Argentina)

1 August 1965

Chile	7–2	Colombia
Sánchez 11'; Méndez 15', 70'; Fouilloux 25', 65'; Campos 42'; Prieto 58'	Report	Segrera 82', 88'

Santiago, Chile
Attendance: 71,152
Referee: Enrique Montes Pedraza (Peru)

7 August 1965

Colombia	2–0	Chile
Rada 71' (pen.), 87'	Report

Barranquilla, Colombia
Attendance: 4,401
Referee: Rodolfo Isaías Rica (Venezuela)

15 August 1965

Ecuador	2–2	Chile
Spencer 15'; Raymondi 84'	Report	Campos 39'; Prieto 57'

Guayaquil, Ecuador
Attendance: 50,041
Referee: Eunápio Gouveia de Queiroz (Brazil)

22 August 1965

Chile	3–1	Ecuador
Sánchez 10' (pen.); Marcos 62'; Fouilloux 78'	Report	Spencer 36'

Santiago, Chile
Attendance: 73,102
Referee: José María Codesal (Uruguay)

=== Play-off ===
Chile and Ecuador finished level on points, and a play-off on neutral ground was played to decide who would qualify.

12 October 1965

Chile	2–1	Ecuador
Sánchez 16'; Marcos 40'	Report	Gómez 89'

Estadio Nacional, Lima (Peru)
Attendance: 44,864
Referee: Roberto Goicoechea (Argentina)

Chile qualified.

== Group 3 ==
Pos	Team	Pld	W	D	L	GF	GA	GD	Pts	Qualification
1	Argentina	4	3	1	0	9	2	+7	7	Qualification for 1966 FIFA World Cup
2	Paraguay	4	1	1	2	3	5	−2	3	
3	Bolivia	4	1	0	3	4	9	−5	2	

Source: AllWorldCup
Rules for classification: Tiebreakers
25 July 1965

Paraguay	2–0	Bolivia
Rodríguez 24'; Rojas 73'	Report

Asunción, Paraguay
Attendance: 18,398
Referee: José Antonio Sundheim (Colombia)

1 August 1965

Argentina	3–0	Paraguay
González 15' (o.g.); Onega 26'; Artime 35'	Report

Buenos Aires, Argentina
Attendance: 63,817
Referee: Pablo Victor Vaga Albergati (Uruguay)

8 August 1965

Paraguay	0–0	Argentina
	Report

Asunción, Paraguay
Attendance: 20,763
Referee: Antônio Viug (Brazil)

17 August 1965

Argentina	4–1	Bolivia
Bernao 3', 56'; Onega 24' (pen.), 25'	Report	Vargas 55'

Buenos Aires, Argentina
Attendance: 56,173
Referee: Esteban Marino (Uruguay)

22 August 1965

Bolivia	2–1	Paraguay
Quevedo 29'; Castillo 75'	Report	Mora 30'

La Paz, Bolivia
Attendance: 7,000
Referee: Eduardo Rendón Villacis (Ecuador)

29 August 1965

Bolivia	1–2	Argentina
Ramos Delgado 35' (o.g.)	Report	Artime 31', 39'

La Paz, Bolivia
Attendance: 9,690
Referee: Carlos Rivero Ángeles (Peru)

Argentina qualified.

== Qualified teams ==
Team	Qualified as	Qualified on	Previous appearances in FIFA World Cup^{1}
Brazil	Defending champions	17 June 1962	7 (1930, 1934, 1938, 1950, 1954, **1958**, **1962**)
Uruguay	Group 1 winners	13 June 1965	3 (**1930**, **1950**, 1954, 1962)
Chile	Group 2 winners	12 October 1965	3 (1930, 1950, 1962)
Argentina	Group 3 winners	29 August 1965	4 (1930, 1934, 1958, 1962)

^{1} Bold indicates champions for that year. Italic indicates hosts for that year.

== Goalscorers ==
5 goals

- (Uruguay) Héctor Silva

4 goals

- (Uruguay) Pedro Rocha

3 goals

- (Argentina) Luis Artime
- (Argentina) Ermindo Onega
- (Chile) Alberto Fouilloux
- (Chile) Leonel Sánchez
- (Ecuador) Enrique Raymondi
- (Peru) Pedro Pablo León

2 goals

- (Argentina) Raúl Bernao
- (Chile) Carlos Campos Sánchez
- (Chile) Rubén Marcos
- (Chile) Eugenio Méndez
- (Chile) Ignacio Prieto
- (Colombia) Antonio Rada
- (Colombia) Hermenegildo Segrera
- (Ecuador) Alberto Spencer
- (Peru) Luis Zavalla

1 goal

- (Bolivia) Fortunato Castillo
- (Bolivia) Ramón Quevedo
- (Bolivia) Rolando Vargas
- (Ecuador) Romulo Gómez
- (Ecuador) Washington Muñoz
- (Paraguay) Celino Mora
- (Paraguay) Vicente Rodríguez
- (Paraguay) Juan Carlos Rojas
- (Peru) Nemesio Mosquera
- (Peru) Jesús Peláez Miranda
- (Peru) Víctor Zegarra
- (Uruguay) Danilo Menezes
- (Uruguay) José Urruzmendi
- (Venezuela) Freddy Elie
- (Venezuela) Rafael Santana
- (Venezuela) Humberto Francisco Scovino
- (Venezuela) Argenis Tortolero

1 own goal

- (Argentina) José Ramos Delgado (playing against Bolivia)
- (Paraguay) Ricardo González (playing against Argentina)
