= 1958 FIFA World Cup qualification (CONMEBOL – Group 2) =

Football tournament

The three teams in this group played against each other on a home-and-away basis. The group winner Argentina qualified for the sixth FIFA World Cup held in Sweden.

== Table ==
Pos	Team	Pld	W	D	L	GF	GA	GR	Pts	Qualification	Argentina national football team	Bolivia national football team	Chile national football team
1	Argentina	4	3	0	1	10	2	5.000	6	Qualification to 1958 FIFA World Cup	—	4–0	4–0
2	Bolivia	4	2	0	2	6	6	1.000	4		2–0	—	3–0
3	Chile	4	1	0	3	2	10	0.200	2		0–2	2–1	—

Source: FIFA

== Matches ==
22 September 1957

Chile	2–1	Bolivia
Díaz 62'; Ramírez 68'	Report	Alcón 36'

Referee: Wyssling (Switzerland)

29 September 1957

Bolivia	3–0	Chile
García 30'; Alcócer 70', 86'	Report

Referee: Wyssling (Switzerland)

6 October 1957

Bolivia	2–0	Argentina
Alcócer 13'; Ramírez 75'	Report

Referee: Wyssling (Switzerland)

13 October 1957

Chile	0–2	Argentina
	Report	Menéndez 40'; Conde 61'

Referee: Wyssling (Switzerland)

20 October 1957

Argentina	4–0	Chile
Corbatta 1', 41'; Menéndez 13'; Zárate 45'	Report

Referee: Wyssling (Switzerland)

27 October 1957

Argentina	4–0	Bolivia
Zárate 8'; Corbatta 62'; Prado 63'; Menéndez 64'	Report

Referee: Wyssling (Switzerland)
