= 1960 Copa Libertadores =

Inaugural season of Copa Libertadores

1960 Copa de Campeones de América
Tournament details
- Dates: April 19 – June 19
- Teams: 7 (from 7 associations)

Final positions
- Champions: (Uruguay) Peñarol (1st title)
- Runners-up: (Paraguay) Olimpia

Tournament statistics
- Matches played: 13
- Goals scored: 39 (3 per match)
- Top scorer: (Ecuador) Alberto Spencer (7 goals)

The 1960 Copa de Campeones de América was the first season of the Copa CONMEBOL Libertadores, CONMEBOL's premier club tournament. Seven associations' clubs entered the first competition, with three not sending a representative. The first match of the tournament was played between Uruguayan side Peñarol and Bolivian side Jorge Wilstermann on April 19 in Montevideo, Uruguay.

During that game, Ausberto García of Jorge Wilstermann became the first player to move the ball in the tournament setting the motions for what was to become one of the most prestigious competitions in the world. Carlos Borges of Peñarol scored the first goal of the tournament, with teammate and legendary figure Alberto Spencer scoring the first hat-trick.

Peñarol would go on to become the first South American club champion after defeating the Olimpia in the finals. With the subsequent results in later editions, Peñarol became the most successful club in the competition until 1973.

== Background ==
CONMEBOL, the governing body of the sport in South America, had been formed in 1916, but for the first forty-three years of its existence, its member associations played only friendly matches against each other, with no prizes at stake. In 1958, however, José Ramos de Freitas, the confederation's president, finally set into motion a competition open to all national champions of the continent, with a trophy to be awarded to the winners. The South American Championship of Champions was the inspiration for the idea to take fruit and formation. Although all national association's champions were eligible to participate, only seven chose to do so: Bahia of Brazil, Jorge Wilstermann of Bolivia, Millonarios of Colombia, Olimpia of Paraguay, Peñarol of Uruguay, San Lorenzo of Argentina and Universidad de Chile of Chile. Peru and Venezuela did not send their respective national league champions since the tournament received general lack of interest from its associations, and Ecuador did not have a national champion to send. The first edition of the Copa de Campeones aroused no great accompaniment to the press particularly in Pacific Rim countries and in Brazil and Argentina.

== Teams ==
Association	Team	Entry stage	Qualification method
(Argentina) Argentina; 1 berth	San Lorenzo	Preliminary round	1959 Primera División champions
(Bolivia) Bolivia; 1 berth	Jorge Wilstermann	Preliminary round	1959 Campeonato Nacional de Bolívia champions
(Brazil) Brazil; 1 berth	Bahia	Preliminary round	1959 Taça Brasil champions
(Chile) Chile; 1 berth	Universidad de Chile	Preliminary round	1959 Nacional de la Primera División champions
(Colombia) Colombia; 1 berth	Millonarios	Preliminary round	1959 Campeonato Profesional champions
Ecuador			
(Paraguay) Paraguay; 1 berth	Olimpia	Semifinals	1959 Primera División champions
Peru			
(Uruguay) Uruguay; 1 berth	Peñarol	Preliminary round	1959 Campeonato Uruguayo de Primera champions
Venezuela			

Notes

1. Ecuador (ECU):
  - Ecuador could not send a team as the Ecuadorian national championship was not held in 1959.
2. Peru (PER):
  - Universitario (1959 Primera División champions) withdrew before the draw after the Peruvian Football Federation declined to cover their expenses to take part in the tournament.
3. Venezuela (VEN):
  - Deportivo Español (1959 Primera División champions) were not entered as the Venezuelan Football Federation were not interested in the tournament.

== Format ==
Each match-up was a two-team group stage. Wins were awarded two points, 1 point for a draw, and no points for a loss. The team with the most points after a home and away game advanced to the next stage. If the teams still remained tied, goal difference will become a factor. A one-game playoff would be implemented in case the teams are still tied. A draw of lots was to become the last solution to breaking a tie.

== Preliminary round ==
Due to there being an odd number of teams in the competition after Universitario of Peru withdrew before the draw, Olimpia received a bye.

The series between San Lorenzo and Bahia finished in a draw on points and the group was decided on goal difference in which the Argentines were allowed through to the semi-finals. Peñarol and Millonarios completed the semi-final line-up after convincing victories over Jorge Wilstermann and Universidad de Chile, respectively.

There was much publicity in Montevideo as the Bolivian champions Jorge Wilstermann arrived four days ahead of the historic, first ever match of the competition. Unlike what was happening in the five other countries of the competitors, the tournament was receiving a lot of coverage from the Uruguayan media. The President of the Bolivian Football Federation, Valera Cámara, arrived in Montevideo nine days before the game to prepare all the details for the stay of the football champion of his country. He also used the occasion to promote the Campeonato Sudamericano that Bolivia was going to organize in 1961 (eventually held in 1963) and to confirm the matches Bolivia was going to play against Uruguay for the qualifiers of the 1962 FIFA World Cup to be held in Chile. Pablo Pérez Estrada, president of Jorge Wilstermann, arrived on April 13.

The 1972 edition of the Journal Estadio de Chile mentioned that the humiliating elimination of Universidad de Chile was attributed to the exhaustion of the team. Estadio mentions that by that time the interest of the La U executives was to take the Chilean champion for an extensive tour to Europe that was extended, on their return, with some more friendly matches in Central America. The Chilean press, highly critical by the 0–6 thrashing in Santiago, labeled Universidad de Chile as a "team of tourists" and even gave them an alluding cartoon.

=== Group 1 ===
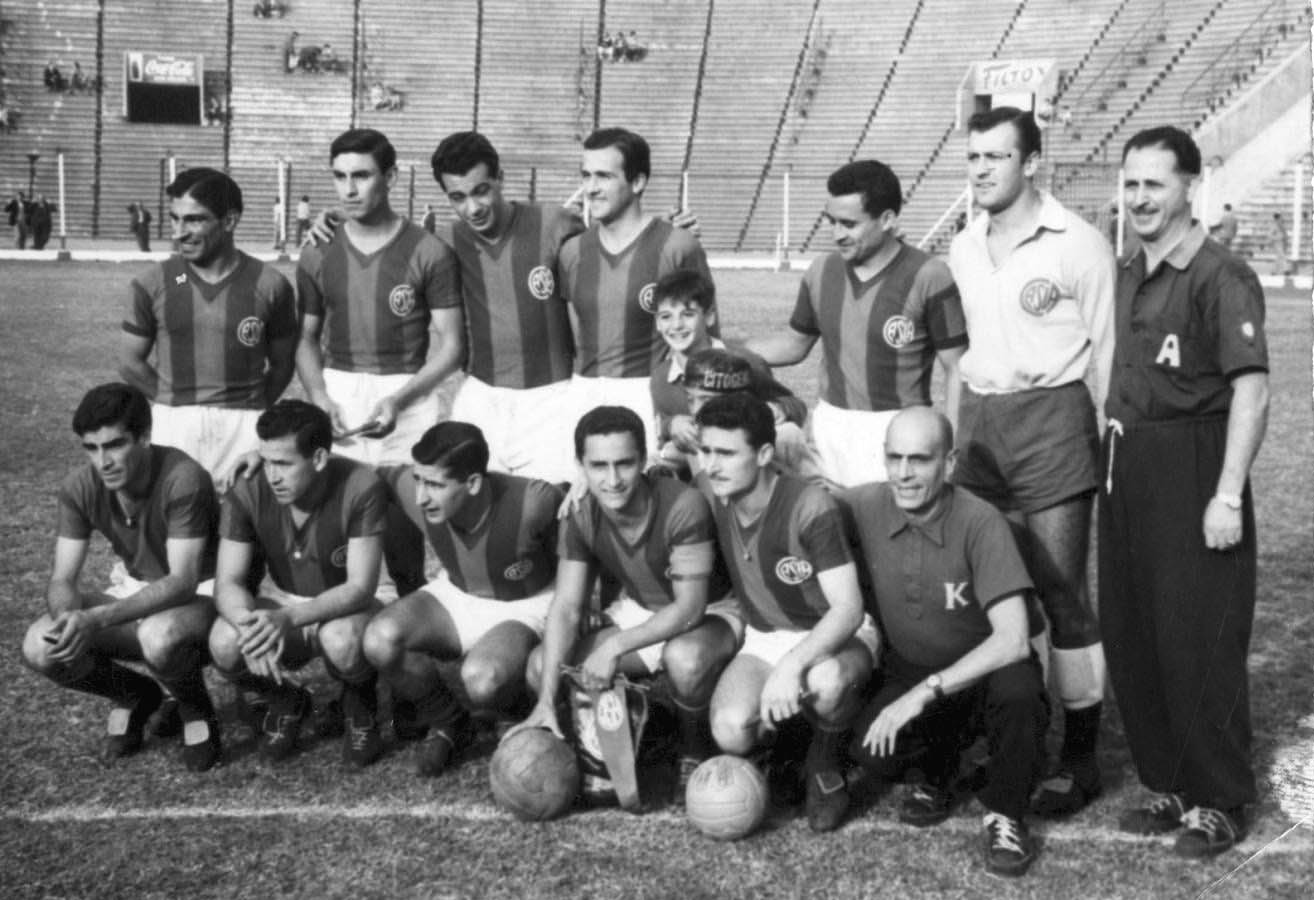
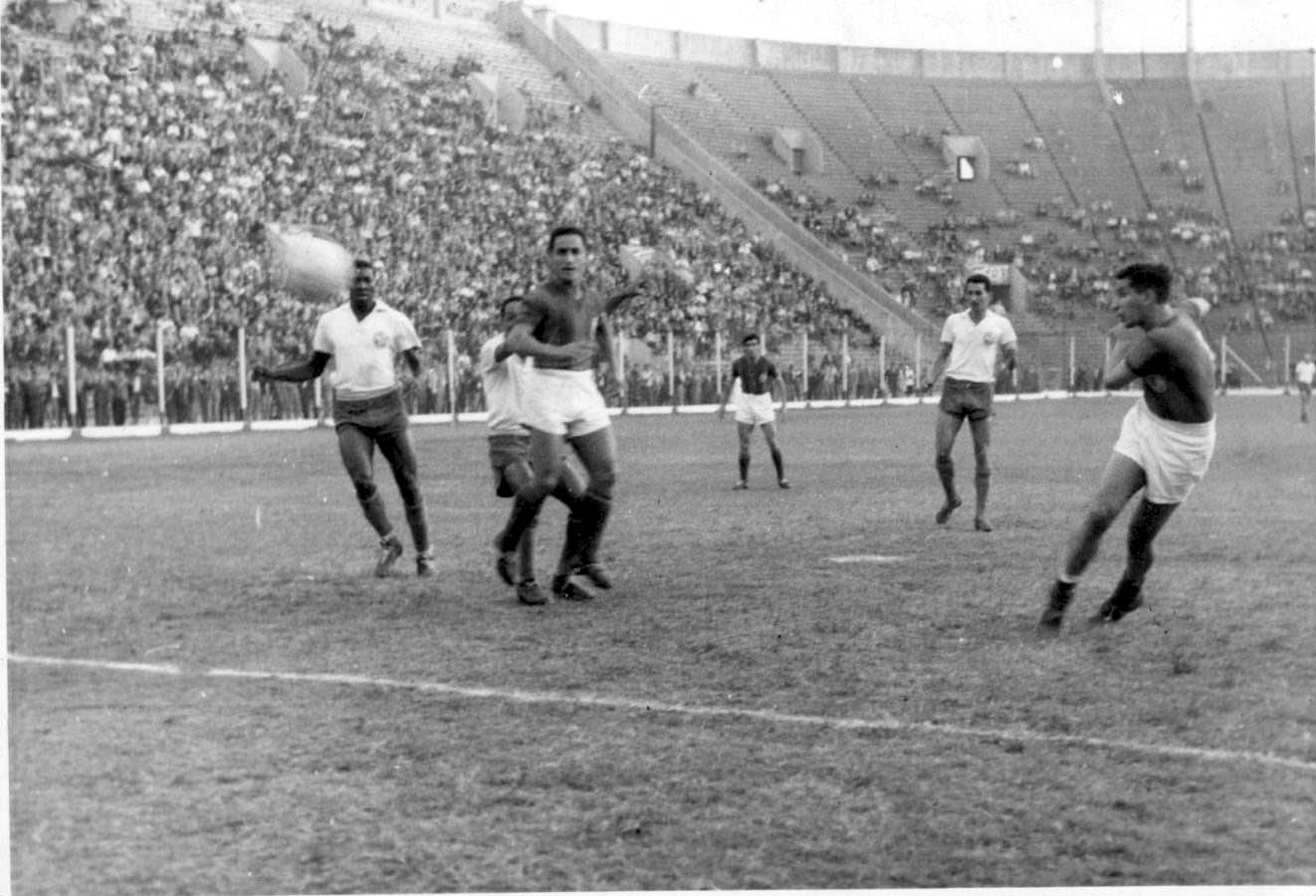
San Lorenzo (left) debuted v EC Bahia at Huracán Stadium

Team	Pld	W	D	L	GF	GA	GD	Pts
(Argentina) San Lorenzo	2	1	0	1	5	3	+2	2
(Brazil) Bahia	2	1	0	1	3	5	−2	2

20 April 1960

San Lorenzo (Argentina)	3–0	(Brazil) Bahia
Rossi 60'; Ruiz 81'; Sanfilippo 89' (pen.)

Estadio Tomás Adolfo Ducó, Buenos Aires
Attendance: ≈10,000
Referee: Esteban Marino (Uruguay)

3 May 1960

Bahia (Brazil)	3–2	(Argentina) San Lorenzo
Carlito 11'; Flavio 38'; Marito 89' (pen.)		9', 59' Sanfilippo

Estádio Octávio Mangabeira (Fonte Nova), Salvador
Attendance: ≈18,000
Referee: Eustasio Catebeke (Paraguay)

=== Group 2 ===
Team	Pld	W	D	L	GF	GA	GD	Pts
(Uruguay) Peñarol	2	1	1	0	8	2	+6	3
(Bolivia) Jorge Wilstermann	2	0	1	1	2	8	−6	1

19 April 1960

Peñarol (Uruguay)	7–1	(Bolivia) Jorge Wilstermann
Borges 13', 27'; Spencer 35', 58', 67', 90'; Cubilla 20'		49' Alcócer

Estadio Centenario, Montevideo
Attendance: ≈35,000
Referee: Carlos Robles (Chile)

30 April 1960

Jorge Wilstermann (Bolivia)	1–1	(Uruguay) Peñarol
Renán López 55'		43' Cubilla

Estadio Hernando Siles, La Paz
Attendance: ≈30,000
Referee: José Luis Praddaude (Argentina)

=== Group 3 ===
Team	Pld	W	D	L	GF	GA	GD	Pts
(Colombia) Millonarios	2	2	0	0	7	0	+7	4
Universidad de Chile	2	0	0	2	0	7	−7	0

8 May 1960

Universidad de Chile	0–6	(Colombia) Millonarios
		Pizarro 4', 82'; Klinger 14', 68'; Micheli 54'; Larraz 71'

Estadio Nacional, Santiago
Attendance: ≈18,000
Referee: Juan Carlos Armental (Uruguay)

15 May 1960

Millonarios (Colombia)	1–0	Universidad de Chile
Pizarro 48'

Estadio Nemesio Camacho (El Campín), Bogotá
Attendance: ≈25,000
Referee: Juan Carlos Armental (Uruguay)

== Semifinals ==
All matches from this stage of the competition onwards resulted in draws except for two. Both semi-final matches of semifinal group A finished in a draw and thus it went into a play-off on a neutral venue. Chile was designated as the venue in which a tie-breaking playoff would be contested in case there was a tie on points. However, the 1960 Valdivia earthquake forced a change of location; Peñarol didn't accept the playoff to be held in Asunción. San Lorenzo, however, allowed the play-off to be held in the home ground of Peñarol in exchange for $100,000. José Sanfilippo later recalled:

With regard to the position taken by our executives on the third game played in Uruguay, Nene said, "I told them (San Lorenzo boardmembers) no! To play again in Montevideo was like going to the lion's mouth", but they didn't listen to me and they accepted the proposal. Their first goal was trout. To put it bluntly, we were screwed over. The Uruguayans thought, "If these idiots were so accepting to play in the 'Centenario', then we can not go easy on them". And then the Paraguayan referee Dimas Larrosa called everything against us all the time. Before, the 'lanyards' usually won and thanks to the bad leadership we had, we were left with nothing. The reality is that the game was given to them for a few bucks."

Olimpia secured the second place in the final by thumping Millonarios at the second leg.

=== Semifinal A ===
Team	Pld	W	D	L	GF	GA	GD	Pts
(Uruguay) Peñarol	2	0	2	0	1	1	0	2
(Argentina) San Lorenzo	2	0	2	0	1	1	0	2

18 May 1960

Peñarol (Uruguay)	1–1	(Argentina) San Lorenzo
Linazza 2'		18' Boggio

Estadio Centenario, Montevideo
Attendance: ≈55,000
Referee: Carlos Robles (Chile)

24 May 1960

San Lorenzo (Argentina)	0–0	(Uruguay) Peñarol

Estadio Tomás Adolfo Ducó, Buenos Aires
Attendance: ≈15,000
Referee: Carlos Robles (Chile)

29 May 1960
Playoff

Peñarol (Uruguay)	2–1	(Argentina) San Lorenzo
Spencer 61', 89'		86' Sanfilippo

Estadio Centenario, Montevideo
Attendance: ≈45,000
Referee: José Dimas Larrosa (Paraguay)

=== Semifinal B ===
Team	Pld	W	D	L	GF	GA	GD	Pts
(Paraguay) Olimpia	2	1	1	0	5	1	+4	3
(Colombia) Millonarios	2	0	1	1	1	5	−4	1

29 May 1960

Millonarios (Colombia)	0–0	(Paraguay) Olimpia

Estadio Nemesio Camacho (El Campín), Bogotá
Attendance: ≈35,000
Referee: José Antonio Sundheim (Colombia)

5 June 1960

Olimpia (Paraguay)	5–1	(Colombia) Millonarios
Doldán 15', 88'; Melgarejo 43'; Noriega 53' (o.g.); Recalde 62'		Pizarro 70'

Estadio Manuel Ferreira (El Bosque de Para Uno), Asunción
Attendance: ≈35,000
Referee: José Luis Praddaude (Argentina)

== Finals ==
The finals were contested between Peñarol and Olimpia over two legs, one at each participating club's stadium. The first leg took place at the Estadio Centenario in Montevideo in which the Manyas won 1–0 thanks to an Alberto Spencer goal late in the game. The second leg was played in the Puerto Sajonia in Asunción. Olimpia was leading 1–0 for the majority of the match, but Luis Cubilla scored the equalizer with only six minutes left in the match to give Peñarol the trophy in the first edition of the competition.

Team	Pld	W	D	L	GF	GA	GD	Pts
(Uruguay) Peñarol	2	1	1	0	2	1	+1	3
(Paraguay) Olimpia	2	0	1	1	1	2	−1	1

12 June 1960

Peñarol (Uruguay)	1–0	(Paraguay) Olimpia
Spencer 79'

Estadio Centenario, Montevideo
Attendance: 44,690
Referee: Carlos Robles (Chile)

19 June 1960

Olimpia (Paraguay)	1–1	(Uruguay) Peñarol
Recalde 28'		83' Cubilla

Puerto Sajonia, Asunción
Attendance: 20,000
Referee: José Luis Praddaude (Argentina)

=== Champions ===
Copa Libertadores de América
1960 Winner

Peñarol
First Title

== Top goalscorers ==
Pos	Player	Team	Goals
1	(Ecuador) Alberto Spencer	(Uruguay) Peñarol	7
2	(Argentina) Rubén Pizarro	(Colombia) Millonarios	4
2	(Argentina) José Sanfilippo	(Argentina) San Lorenzo	4
4	(Uruguay) Luis Cubilla	(Uruguay) Peñarol	3
5	(Uruguay) Carlos Borges	(Uruguay) Peñarol	2
5	(Paraguay) Luis Doldán	(Paraguay) Olimpia	2
5	(Colombia) Marino Klinger	(Colombia) Millonarios	2
5	(Paraguay) Hipólito Recalde	(Paraguay) Olimpia	2

== Footnotes ==
A. Brazil did not have a national league at the time. Instead they sent their Taça Brasil champion.
