= 1963 in Brazilian football =

Football in Brazil
- Season: 1963

The following article presents a summary of the 1963 football (soccer) season in Brazil, which was the 62nd season of competitive football in the country.

== Taça Brasil ==
Semifinals

Team 1	Agg.	Team 2	1st leg	2nd leg
Bahia	1-0	Botafogo	1-0	0-0
Grêmio	4-7	Santos	1-3	3-4

Final

January 25, 1964

Santos	6–0	Bahia

January 28, 1964

Bahia	0–2	Santos

Santos declared as the Taça Brasil champions by aggregate score of 8–0.

== Torneio Rio-São Paulo ==
First Stage

Position	Team	Points	Played	Won	Drawn	Lost	For	Against	Difference
1	Santos	13	9	6	1	2	30	15	15
2	Corinthians	12	9	6	0	3	15	9	8
3	Fluminense	11	9	4	3	2	13	12	1
4	Botafogo	10	9	3	4	2	16	14	2
5	Palmeiras	10	9	4	2	3	12	12	0
6	Portuguesa	9	9	3	3	3	19	21	-3
7	Portuguesa	8	9	4	0	5	14	13	1
8	São Paulo	8	9	3	2	4	11	16	-5
9	Vasco da Gama	7	9	1	5	3	9	12	-3
10	Olaria	7	9	0	2	7	9	23	-14

Santos declared as the Torneio Rio-São Paulo champions.

== State championship champions ==
State	Champion	State	Champion
Acre	Independência	Pará	Paysandu
Alagoas	CSA	Paraíba	Campinense
Amapá	CEA	Paraná	Grêmio Maringá
Amazonas	Nacional	Pernambuco	Náutico
Bahia	Fluminense de Feira	Piauí	River
Ceará	Ceará	Rio de Janeiro	Goytacaz
Distrito Federal	Cruzeiro do Sul	Rio Grande do Norte	Alecrim
Espírito Santo	Rio Branco-ES	Rio Grande do Sul	Grêmio
Goiás	Vila Nova	Rondônia	Ferroviário-RO
Guanabara	Flamengo	Roraima	-
Maranhão	Maranhão	Santa Catarina	Marcílio Dias
Mato Grosso	Dom Bosco	São Paulo	Palmeiras
Mato Grosso do Sul	-	Sergipe	Confiança
Minas Gerais	Atlético Mineiro	Tocantins	-

== Brazilian clubs in international competitions ==
Team	Copa Libertadores 1963	Intercontinental Cup 1963
Botafogo	Semifinals	N/A
Santos	Champions	Champions

== Brazil national team ==
The following table lists all the games played by the Brazil national football team in official competitions and friendly matches during 1963.

Date	Opposition	Result	Score	Brazil scorers	Competition
March 3, 1963	Paraguay	D	2-2	Flávio, Hílton Chaves	International Friendly
March 10, 1963	Peru	W	1-0	Flavio	South American Championship
March 14, 1963	Colombia	W	5-1	Oswaldo, Marco Antônio, Flávio (2), Fernando Consul	South American Championship
March 17, 1963	Paraguay	L	0-2	-	South American Championship
March 24, 1963	Argentina	L	0-3	-	South American Championship
March 27, 1963	Ecuador	D	2-2	Oswaldo (2)	South American Championship
March 31, 1963	Bolivia	L	4-5	Marco Antônio (2), Flávio (2)	South American Championship
April 13, 1963	Argentina	L	2-3	Pepe (2)	Roca Cup
April 16, 1963	Argentina	W	5-2	Pelé (3), Amarildo (2)	Roca Cup
April 21, 1963	Portugal	L	0-1	-	International Friendly
April 24, 1963	Belgium	L	1-5	Quarentinha	International Friendly
April 28, 1963	France	W	3-2	Pelé (3)	International Friendly
May 2, 1963	Netherlands	L	0-1	-	International Friendly
May 5, 1963	West Germany	W	2-1	Coutinho, Pelé	International Friendly
May 8, 1963	England	D	1-1	Pepe	International Friendly
May 12, 1963	Italy	L	0-3	-	International Friendly
May 17, 1963	Egypt	W	1-0	Quarentinha	International Friendly
May 19, 1963	Israel	W	5-0	Amarildo (2), Zequinha, Quarentinha (2)	International Friendly
May 22, 1963	(Germany) Berlin-Ulm-Frankfurt Combined Team	W	3-0	Quarentinha, Marcos, Amarildo	International Friendly (unofficial match)
