= Copa do Atlântico =

- Organiser(s): AFA; CBF; AUF
- Founded: 1956
- Abolished: 1956; 70 years ago
- Region: South America
- Teams: 15
- Last champions: (None) (Note: Finals between Boca Juniors (Argentina) and Corinthians (Brazil) suspended and never re-scheduled.)
- Most championships: (None)

The Copa do Atlântico was a football club competition held in 1956, also known as Copa Libertadores 1956. It was played in parallel to the 1956 Taça do Atlântico ("Copa del Atlántico" in Spanish), in which the national teams of Argentina, Brazil and Uruguay participated.

The competition was organised by three bodies, Argentine, Brazilian and Uruguayan Football Associations, with five teams from each associations taking part of the tournament. The Copa do Atlântico, along with South American Championship of Champions and Copa Aldao, was one of the predecessors of Copa Libertadores, which would be held for the first time in 1960.

== Qualified teams ==
Association	Club	Qualification method
Argentina	River Plate	1956 Argentine Primera División champion
Argentina	Lanús	1956 Primera División 2nd place
Argentina	Boca Juniors	1956 Primera División 3rd place
Argentina	Racing	1956 Primera División 4th place
Argentina	San Lorenzo	1956 Primera División 8th place
Brazil	São Paulo	1956 Torneio Rio – São Paulo champion
Brazil	Santos	1956 Campeonato Paulista champion
Brazil	Corinthians	1956 Campeonato Paulista 2nd place
Brazil	Fluminense	1956 Campeonato Carioca 2nd place
Brazil	America (RJ)	1956 Campeonato Carioca 5th place
Uruguay	Nacional	1956 Primera División Champion
Uruguay	Peñarol	1956 Primera División 2nd place
Uruguay	Defensor Sporting	1956 Primera División 4th place
Uruguay	Wanderers	1956 Primera División 5th place
Uruguay	Danubio	1956 Primera División 8th place

== Tournament ==
=== First stage ===
Club #1	Result	Club #2	Venue	Date
Lanús (Argentina)	5–1	(Uruguay) Defensor Sporting	Gasómetro, Buenos Aires	June 20
Wanderers (Uruguay)	2–1	(Argentina) San Lorenzo	Centenario, Montevideo	June 20
Nacional (Uruguay)	0–1	(Brazil) São Paulo	Centenario, Montevideo	June 23
Corinthians (Brazil)	2–2	(Uruguay) Danubio	Pacaembu, São Paulo	June 23
America (RJ) (Brazil)	2–1	(Argentina) Racing	Maracanã, Rio de Janeiro	June 23
Santos (Brazil)	4–0	(Argentina) River Plate	Vila Belmiro, Santos	June 24
Peñarol (Uruguay)	0–1	(Argentina) Boca Juniors	Centenario, Montevideo	June 24

- Fluminense by drawing directly joined in the second stage.
- The contest between Danubio e Corinthians was defined in penalties with Corinthians won 4x2.

=== Quarterfinals ===
Club #1	Result	Club #2	Venue	Date
São Paulo (Brazil)	3–1	(Brazil) America (RJ)	Pacaembu, São Paulo	June 30
Wanderers (Uruguay)	0–2	(Argentina) Lanús	Centenario, Montevideo	June 30
Boca Juniors (Argentina)	3–1	(Brazil) Fluminense	Gasómetro, Buenos Aires	July 1
Corinthians (Brazil)	4–3	(Brazil) Santos	Pacaembu, São Paulo	July 4

=== Semifinals ===
Club #1	Result	Club #2	Venue	Date
Boca Juniors (Argentina)	2–0	(Argentina) Lanús	Gasómetro, Buenos Aires	July 5
Corinthians (Brazil)	2–0	(Brazil) São Paulo	Pacaembu, São Paulo	July 7

=== Finals ===
Three matches series, two never played, but one final was played, with Corinthians winning Boca Juniors by 3x2: (Note: The final between Boca Juniors and Corinthians was to be played as a "best-of-three" series; however, the second and third match were never played, with no champion crowned.)

Leg	Club #1	Result	Club #2	Venue	Date
1	Corinthians (Brazil)	3 x 2	(Argentina) Boca Juniors		July 19
2	Corinthians (Brazil)	–	(Argentina) Boca Juniors	–	
3	Corinthians (Brazil)	–	(Argentina) Boca Juniors	–	

== Bracket ==
Round of 16
(Argentina) Lanús	5
(Uruguay) Defensor Sporting	1
(Uruguay) Wanderers	2
(Argentina) San Lorenzo	1
(Argentina) Boca Juniors	1
(Uruguay) Peñarol	0
???
???
(Brazil) São Paulo	1
(Uruguay) Nacional	0
(Brazil) América (RJ)	2
(Argentina) Racing	1
(Brazil) Corinthians (p)	2
(Uruguay) Danubio	2
(Brazil) Santos	4
(Argentina) River Plate	0

Quarterfinals
(Argentina) Lanús	2
(Uruguay) Montevideo Wanderers	0
(Argentina) Boca Juniors	3
(Brazil) Fluminense	1
(Brazil) São Paulo	3
(Brazil) América (RJ)	1
(Brazil) Corinthians	4
(Brazil) Santos	3

Semifinals
(Argentina) Lanús	0
(Argentina) Boca Juniors	2
(Brazil) São Paulo	0
(Brazil) Corinthians	2

Finals
(Argentina) Boca Juniors	2	–
(Brazil) Corinthians	3	–

== Top goalscorers ==
Rank	Name	Team	Goals
1	(Brazil) Paulo Pisaneschi	(Brazil) Corinthians	3
1	(Argentina) José Borello	(Argentina) Boca Juniors	3
