= 1966 FIFA World Cup qualification (CONMEBOL – Group 2) =

1966 association football tournament

The three teams in this group played against each other on a home-and-away basis. Chile and Ecuador finished level on points, a play-off on neutral ground was played to decide who would qualify. The winner (Chile) qualified for the 1966 FIFA World Cup held in England.

== Standings ==
Pos	Team	Pld	W	D	L	GF	GA	GD	Pts	Qualification	(Chile national football team)	(Ecuador national football team)	(Colombia national football team)
1	Chile	4	2	1	1	12	7	+5	5	Advance to play-off	—	3–1	7–2
2	Ecuador	4	2	1	1	6	5	+1	5	Advance to play-off	2–2	—	2–0
3	Colombia	4	1	0	3	4	10	−6	2		2–0	0–1	—

Source: AllWorldCup
Rules for classification: Tiebreakers

== Matches ==
20 July 1965

Colombia	0–1	Ecuador
	Report	Muñoz 18'

Barranquilla, Colombia
Attendance: 10,175
Referee: Enrique Montes Pedraza (Peru)

25 July 1965

Ecuador	2–0	Colombia
Raymondi 56', 77'	Report

Guayaquil, Ecuador
Attendance: 48,457
Referee: Luis Pedro Spinetto (Argentina)

1 August 1965

Chile	7–2	Colombia
Sánchez 11'; Méndez 15', 70'; Fouilloux 25', 65'; Campos 42'; Prieto 58'	Report	Segrera 82', 88'

Santiago, Chile
Attendance: 71,152
Referee: Enrique Montes Pedraza (Peru)

7 August 1965

Colombia	2–0	Chile
Rada 71' (pen.), 87'	Report

Barranquilla, Colombia
Attendance: 4,401
Referee: Rodolfo Isaías Rica (Venezuela)

15 August 1965

Ecuador	2–2	Chile
Spencer 15'; Raymondi 84'	Report	Campos 39'; Prieto 57'

Guayaquil, Ecuador
Attendance: 50,041
Referee: Eunápio Gouveia de Queiroz (Brazil)

22 August 1965

Chile	3–1	Ecuador
Sánchez 10' (pen.); Marcos 62'; Fouilloux 78'	Report	Spencer 36'

Santiago, Chile
Attendance: 73,102
Referee: José María Codesal (Uruguay)

Chile and Ecuador finished level on points, and a play-off on neutral ground was played to decide who would qualify.

=== Play-off ===
12 October 1965

Chile	2–1	Ecuador
Sánchez 16'; Marcos 40'	Report	Gómez 89'

Estadio Nacional, Lima (Peru)
Attendance: 44,864
Referee: Roberto Goicoechea (Argentina)

Chile qualified.

== Goalscorers ==
There were 25 goals scored in 7 matches, for an average of 3.57 goals per match.

3 goals

- (Chile) Alberto Fouillioux
- (Chile) Leonel Sánchez
- (Ecuador) Enrique Raymondi

2 goals

- (Chile) Carlos Campos
- (Chile) Eugenio Méndez
- (Chile) Ignacio Prieto
- (Chile) Rubén Marcos
- (Colombia) Antonio Rada
- (Colombia) Hermenegildo Segrera
- (Ecuador) Alberto Spencer

1 goal

- (Ecuador) Romulo Gómez
- (Ecuador) Washington Muñoz
