= 1962 FIFA World Cup qualification (CONMEBOL) =

FIFA World Cup qualification (CONMEBOL)
Tournament details
- Dates: 4 December 1960 - 5 November 1961
- Teams: 7 (from 1 confederation)

Tournament statistics
- Matches played: 6
- Goals scored: 22 (3.67 per match)
- Attendance: 260,274 (43,379 per match)
- Top scorer: (Argentina) Oreste Corbatta (3 goals)

The South American section of the 1962 FIFA World Cup qualification saw 7 teams competing 3 berths in the finals.

== Format ==
Among the 7 teams, Paraguay were drawn to play in the CONMEBOL / CCCF / NAFC Intercontinental Play-off. The remaining 6 teams were divided into 3 groups of 2 teams each. The teams played against each other on a home-and-away basis with the group winners would qualifying for the final tournament. Brazil did not participate, as they qualified automatically after winning the 1958 World Cup while Chile qualified automatically as hosts. Venezuela did not enter the tournament.

== Groups ==
=== Group 1 ===
Pos	Team	Pld	W	D	L	GF	GA	GD	Pts	Qualification	Argentina national football team	Ecuador national football team
1	Argentina	2	2	0	0	11	3	+8	4	Qualification to 1962 FIFA World Cup	—	5–0
2	Ecuador	2	0	0	2	3	11	−8	0		3–6	—

Source: FIFA
4 December 1960

Ecuador	3–6	Argentina
Spencer 81'; Raffo 83', 85'	Report	Corbatta 5' (pen.), 40'; Pando 12'; Sosa 14'; Sanfilippo 47'; Ramaciotti 75'

Guayaquil, Ecuador
Attendance: 60,000
Referee: Robles (Chile)

17 December 1960

Argentina	5–0	Ecuador
Gómez 6' (o.g.); Sanfilippo 53'; Corbatta 55' (pen.); Sosa 75'; Pando 89'	Report

Buenos Aires, Argentina
Attendance: 50,000
Referee: Robles (Chile)

=== Group 2 ===
Pos	Team	Pld	W	D	L	GF	GA	GD	Pts	Qualification	Uruguay national football team	Bolivia national football team
1	Uruguay	2	1	1	0	3	2	+1	3	Qualification to 1962 FIFA World Cup	—	2–1
2	Bolivia	2	0	1	1	2	3	−1	1		1–1	—

Source: FIFA
15 July 1961

Bolivia	1–1	Uruguay
Alcócer 54'	Report	Cubilla 23'

La Paz, Bolivia
Attendance: 22,000
Referee: Robles (Chile)

30 July 1961

Uruguay	2–1	Bolivia
Cabrera 3'; Escalada 39'	Report	Camacho 65'

Montevideo, Uruguay
Attendance: 51,695
Referee: Robles (Chile)

=== Group 3 ===
Pos	Team	Pld	W	D	L	GF	GA	GD	Pts	Qualification	Colombia national football team	Peru national football team
1	Colombia	2	1	1	0	2	1	+1	3	Qualification to 1962 FIFA World Cup	—	1–0
2	Peru	2	0	1	1	1	2	−1	1		1–1	—

Source: FIFA
30 April 1961

Colombia	1–0	Peru
Escobar 27'	Report

Bogotá, Colombia
Attendance: 26,000
Referee: Praddaude (Argentina)

7 May 1961

Peru	1–1	Colombia
Delgado 3' (pen.)	Report	González 68'

Lima, Peru
Attendance: 50,579
Referee: Marino (Uruguay)

== Inter-confederation play-offs ==
Pos	Team	Pld	W	D	L	GF	GA	GD	Pts	Qualification	(Mexico)	(Paraguay)
1	Mexico	2	1	1	0	1	0	+1	3	1962 FIFA World Cup	—	1–0
2	Paraguay	2	0	1	1	0	1	−1	1		0–0	—

Source: RSSSF

== Qualified Teams ==
Team	Qualified as	Qualified on	Previous appearances in FIFA World Cup^{1}
Chile	Hosts	10 June 1956	2 (1930, 1950)
Brazil	Defending champions	29 June 1958	6 (1930, 1934, 1938, 1950, 1954, **1958**)
Argentina	Group 1 winners	17 December 1960	3 (1930, 1934, 1958)
Uruguay	Group 2 winners	30 July 1961	3 (**1930**, **1950**, 1954)
Colombia	Group 3 winners	7 May 1961	0 (debut)

^{1} Bold indicates champions for that year. Italic indicates hosts for that year.

== Goalscorers ==
3 goals

- (Argentina) Oreste Corbatta

2 goals

- (Argentina) Martín Pando
- (Argentina) José Sanfilippo
- (Argentina) Rubén Héctor Sosa
- (Ecuador) Carlos Alberto Raffo

1 goal

- (Argentina) Ricardo José Maria Ramaciotti
- (Bolivia) Máximo Alcócer
- (Bolivia) Wilfredo Camacho
- (Colombia) Eusebio Escobar
- (Colombia) Héctor Garzon González
- (Ecuador) Alberto Spencer
- (Peru) Faustino Delgado
- (Uruguay) Ángel Cabrera
- (Uruguay) Luis Cubilla
- (Uruguay) Guillermo Escalada

1 own goal

- (Ecuador) Romulo Gómez (playing against Argentina)
