= Almir =

Almir may refer to:

- Almir (given name)
- Almir (footballer, born 1938), Brazilian football striker Almir da Silva
- Almir (footballer, born 1969), Brazilian football striker Almir de Souza Fraga
- Almir (footballer, born 1973), Brazilian football manager and former midfielder Almir Moraes Andrade
- Almir (footballer, born 1982), Almir Lopes de Luna, Brazilian football attacking midfielder
- Almir (footballer, born 1985), Brazilian footballer Jose Almir Barros Neto
