= Norberto Menéndez =

Argentine footballer (1936–1994)

Beto Menéndez
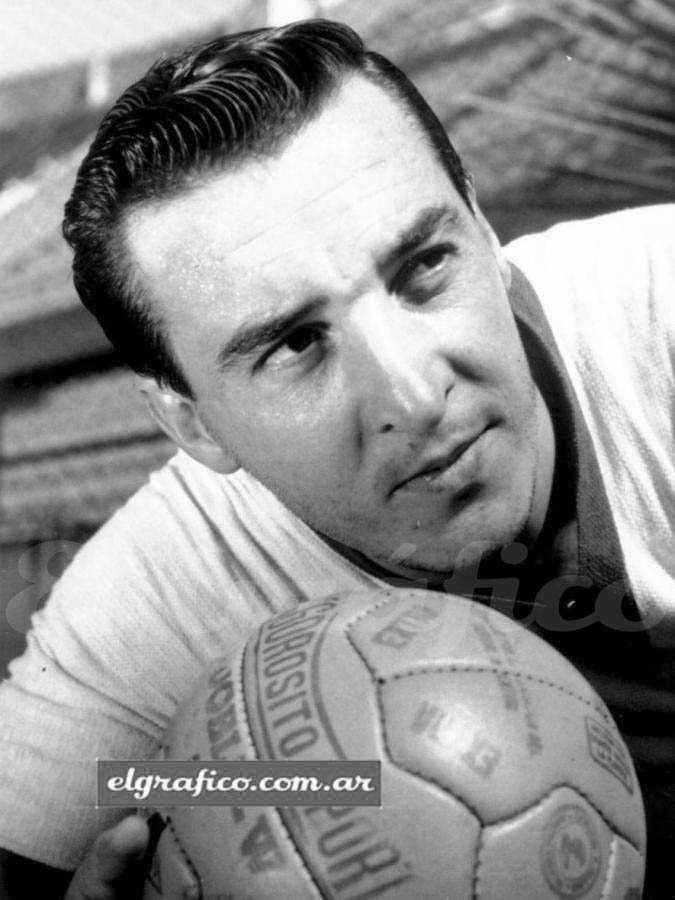
- Menéndez in 1961

Personal information
- Date of birth: 14 December 1936
- Place of birth: Buenos Aires, Argentina
- Date of death: 26 May 1994 (aged 57)
- Place of death: Buenos Aires, Argentina
- Position: Inside forward

Youth career
- River Plate

Senior career*
Years	Team	Apps	(Gls)
1954–1960	River Plate	124	(57)
1961	Huracán	16	(8)
1962–1967	Boca Juniors	98	(21)
1968	Colón de Santa Fe	12	(1)
1969–1971	Defensor		

International career
1957–1958	Argentina	14	(4)
- * Club domestic league appearances and goals

Norberto "Beto" Menéndez (14 December 1936 – 26 May 1994) was an Argentine footballer who played as an inside forward. He scored one goal for the Argentina national team at the 1958 World Cup in Sweden, against Northern Ireland, adding to Argentina's only victory in the tournament, 3–1. Menéndez won six Argentine Primera Division titles during his career. He has the distinction of being the only footballer who, having played for the two giants of the Argentine league (Boca Juniors and River Plate), won three league championships each, respectively.

He was also the first player of Argentina's national team to have scored a goal at the qualification standings of a World Cup, on 13 October 1957 against Chile.

== Club career ==
Menéndez was born in 1936 in Buenos Aires, Argentina. started his playing career with River Plate in 1954 where he composed a famous couple of strikers along with Enríque Omar Sívori, winning three consecutive championships (1955–1956–1957). In 1961 he moved to Huracán, with little success. He signed for River's archrivals Boca Juniors in 1962, where he played 123 matches and scored 31 goals in all competitions and won the leagues of 1962, 1964 and 1965. In 1968 Menéndez moved to Colón de Santa Fe, and ended his career playing for Defensor of Uruguay.

== Honours ==
River Plate

- Argentine Primera División: 1955, 1956, 1957

Boca Juniors

- Argentine Primera División: 1962, 1964, 1965
- Copa Libertadores runner-up: 1963
