= Máximo Ramírez =

Bolivian footballer (1933–2007)

Personal information
- Full name: Máximo Ramírez Burgos
- Date of birth: 9 June 1933
- Place of birth: La Paz, La Paz Department, Bolivia
- Date of death: 6 February 2007 (aged 73)
- Position: Midfielder

Senior career*
Years	Team	Apps	(Gls)
1952–1958	Club Deportivo Ferroviario		
1958–1969	The Strongest		

International career
1957–1965	Bolivia	27	(1)
Medal record
Representing Bolivia
Copa América
Winner	1963 Bolivia
- * Club domestic league appearances and goals

Máximo Ramírez Burgos (9 June 1933 – 6 February 2007) was a Bolivian football midfielder. Nicknamed "Chino", he played in five matches for the Bolivia national football team in 1963. He was also part of Bolivia's squad that won the 1963 South American Championship.

== Personal life ==
Máximo was born in La Paz, La Paz Department, Bolivia on 9 June 1933, as the son of Ángel Ramírez and Vicenta Burgos. He would later marry Lidia Appez and have two children with her, Carlos Max and Ximena Ángela. Ramírez died on 6 February 2007 from pulmonary embolism.

== Club career ==
Ramírez began his career with Club Deportivo Ferroviario in 1952 and would be part of the winning team for the 1955 Campeonato Paceño de Fútbol. He was then transferred to play for The Strongest in 1958, being part of the winning teams of the 1964 Campeonato Paceño de Fútbol and the 1964 Bolivian Primera División. In his final years, he would become the manager of the club's academy, Complejo de Achumani.

== National career ==
Ramírez began his international career in 1957 and would play in 27 matches with his only goal being against Argentina. He marked his debut during the 1953 South American Championship where he would only play in the opening match with a surprise victory against Peru. He would participate in the winning teams of four editions of the Copa Paz del Chaco and the 1963 South American Championship. Known as "el León del Centenario" by Uruguay during the 1962 FIFA World Cup qualifiers, he would play in the second match between Uruguay and Bolivia on 30 July 1961 where Bolivia would lose 2–1.
