= Oppe Quiñonez =

Paraguayan footballer (1933–2019)

Personal information
- Date of birth: 25 March 1933
- Date of death: 21 November 2019 (aged 86)

International career
Years	Team	Apps	(Gls)
1963–1966	Paraguay	11	(1)

Oppe Quiñonez (25 March 1933 – 21 November 2019) was a Paraguayan footballer. He played in eleven matches for the Paraguay national football team from 1963 to 1966. He was also part of Paraguay's squad for the 1963 South American Championship.
