= Francisco González (Colombian footballer) =

Colombian footballer (born 1936)

Personal information
- Date of birth: 18 May 1936 (age 90)
- Place of birth: Bello, Colombia

International career
Years	Team	Apps	(Gls)
1963	Colombia	3	(1)

Francisco González (born 18 May 1936) is a Colombian footballer. He played in three matches for the Colombia national football team in 1963. He was also part of Colombia's squad for the 1963 South American Championship.
