= Javier Méndez (Chilean footballer) =

Chilean footballer (born 1949)

Personal information
- Full name: Javier Jesús Méndez Henríquez
- Date of birth: 6 June 1949 (age 77)
- Place of birth: Valparaíso, Chile
- Position: Forward

Senior career*
Years	Team	Apps	(Gls)
1969	Unión Española		
1970	Naval		
1971	Coquimbo Unido		
1972-1975	Aviación		
1976–1978	Huachipato		
1978–1983	Wolfsberger AC		

International career
1974–1975	Chile	4	(1)
- * Club domestic league appearances and goals

Javier Jesús Méndez Henríquez (born 6 June 1949) is a Chilean former professional footballer who played as a forward.

== Career ==
At club level, Méndez played for Unión Española, Naval, Coquimbo Unido, Aviación, Huachipato and Wolfsberger AC.

He played in four matches for the Chile national football team from 1974 to 1975. He was also part of Chile's squad for the 1975 Copa América tournament.

== Personal life ==
He is the younger brother of Eugenio Méndez, who is also a Chilean former international footballer.

== Honours ==
Chile

- Copa Acosta Ñu: 1974
