= Ernesto Juárez =

Argentine footballer

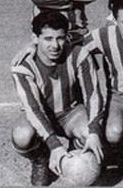

Personal information
- Full name: Ernesto Humberto Juárez
- Date of birth: 16 December 1934 (age 91)
- Position: Forward

International career
Years	Team	Apps	(Gls)
1962–1963	Argentina	11	(2)

Ernesto Humberto Juárez (born 16 December 1934) is an Argentine footballer. He played in eleven matches for the Argentina national football team in 1962 and 1963. He was also part of Argentina's squad for the 1963 South American Championship.
