= Félix Arámbulo =

Paraguayan footballer (1942–2018)

Personal information
- Date of birth: 7 January 1942
- Date of death: 16 March 2018 (aged 76)
- Position: Forward

International career
Years	Team	Apps	(Gls)
1962–1963	Paraguay	6	(1)

Félix Arámbulo (7 January 1942 – 16 March 2018) was a Paraguayan footballer. He played in six matches for the Paraguay national football team from 1962 to 1963. He was also part of Paraguay's squad for the 1963 South American Championship.
