= Faustino (footballer, born 1940) =

Brazilian footballer

Personal information
- Full name: Alcides da Cruz Faustino
- Date of birth: 2 December 1940
- Place of birth: Araraquara, Brazil
- Date of death: 12 February 1988 (aged 47)
- Place of death: São Paulo, Brazil
- Position: Right winger

Youth career
- –1957: Ferroviária

Senior career*
Years	Team	Apps	(Gls)
1957–1960	Ferroviária		
1961–1968	São Paulo	231	(35)
1966–1967	→ Bragantino (loan)		
1969	Comercial de Tietê		
- * Club domestic league appearances and goals as of 13 September 2023

Alcides da Cruz Faustino (2 December 1940 – 12 February 1988), simply known as Faustino, was a Brazilian professional footballer who played as a right winger.

== Career ==
Highlighted by his great dribbling ability, Faustino stood out at Ferroviária and was signed by São Paulo, where he played most of his career. He ended his career at Comercial de Tietê after suffering from ankle injuries. Became a physical education teacher after retiring from football.

== Honours ==
=== São Paulo ===
- Small Club World Cup: 1963

== Death ==
Faustino died at the age of 47, after responding to an armed robbery in São Paulo.
