= Cecilio Martínez =

Paraguayan footballer (born 1943)

Personal information
- Date of birth: 1 February 1943 (age 83)

International career
Years	Team	Apps	(Gls)
1961–1963	Paraguay	9	(5)

Cecilio Martínez (born 1 February 1943) is a Paraguayan footballer. He played in nine matches for the Paraguay national football team from 1961 to 1963. He was also part of Paraguay's squad for the 1963 South American Championship.

== Honours ==
=== São Paulo ===
- Small Club World Cup: 1963
