= Eliseo Prado =

Argentine footballer

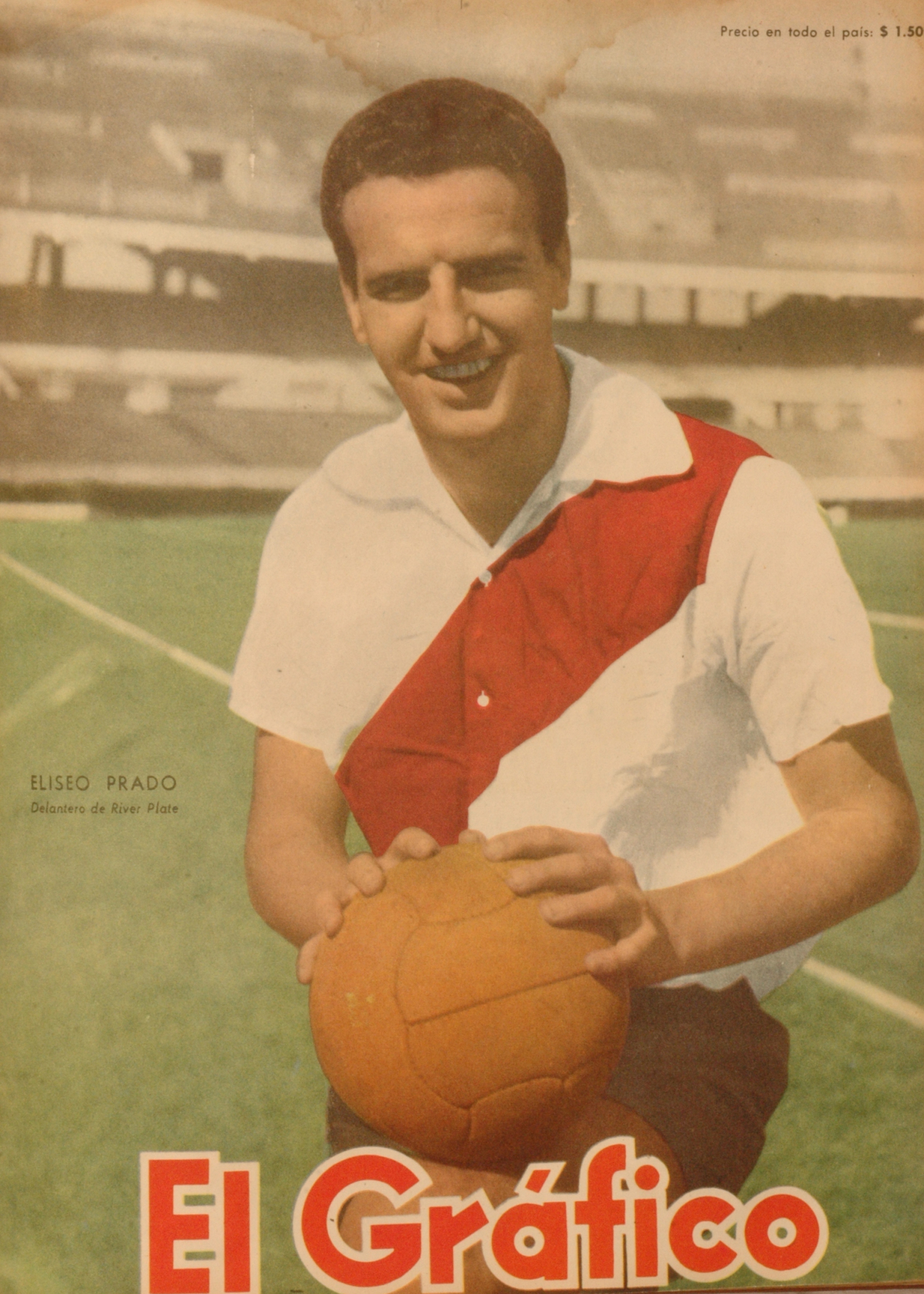
- Prado in 1953

Personal information
- Full name: Eliseo Rubén Prado
- Date of birth: 17 September 1929
- Place of birth: Buenos Aires, Argentina
- Date of death: 10 February 2016 (aged 86)
- Position: Forward

Youth career
- River Plate

Senior career*
Years	Team	Apps	(Gls)
1948–1958	River Plate	147	(61)
1959–1962	Gimnasia La Plata	89	(13)
1963	Sportivo Italiano	24	(3)

International career
1954–1958	Argentina	7	(3)
- * Club domestic league appearances and goals

Eliseo Rubén Prado (17 September 1929 – 10 February 2016) was an Argentine dentist and former professional footballer who played as a forward. Nicknamed as ''El Doctor'' (The Doctor), Prado was an important part of La Maquinita team in River Plate, where he played the most part of his career. He also represented Argentina in the 1958 FIFA World Cup.

== Early life ==
Prado born in the Almagro barrio in 1929, he grew up and lived there for almost his entire life. Despite the immense fame he gained as part of one of the most iconic forward lines in the history of Argentine football, he always preferred to stay away from the limelight and excessive luxuries. Alongside football, he also studied dentistry, in which he would eventually graduate from the University of Buenos Aires (UBA).

== Club career ==
=== River Plate ===
Prado arrived at River Plate as a teenager to develop within the club’s youth academy. Early on, he played primarily as a striker, though he would later shift further to the right (inside-right).

In late 1948, a prolonged strike by professional footballers broke out in Argentina. To fulfill the championship schedule, clubs were forced to play the final rounds of that tournament —as well as the start of the 1949 season— using youth players from their academies. This gave Prado the opportunity to make his professional debut in Primera. Once the labor dispute was resolved and the star players returned, he had to go back to playing for the reserve team to continue his development.

Establishing officially in 1951, he was a member of the so-called "La Maquinita" —the fine River Plate side of the 1950s— alongside Amadeo Carrizo, Walter Gómez, Santiago Vernazza, Ángel Labruna, Omar Sívori, Alfredo Di Stéfano and Félix Loustau, among others.

=== Gimnasia de La Plata ===
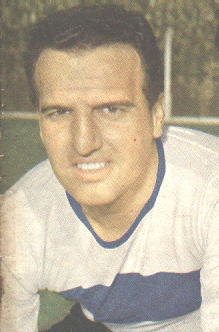
Prado with Gimnasia in 1961

In late 1958, River Plate decided not to renew the contracts of several of its veteran players, including Ángel Labruna and Eliseo Prado himself.

Prado made his official debut for Gimnasia y Esgrima de La Plata on May 19, 1959, in a match against Central Córdoba de Rosario. He quickly became one of the team's key attacking players. The high point of his career in La Plata came in 1962, a year in which he was part of one of the best squads in the history of "El Lobo" under the management of Adolfo Pedernera.

=== Sportivo Italiano ===
At the age of 34, having concluded his stint in the Primera División with Gimnasia y Esgrima La Plata, Prado already had a well-established dental practice in Almagro; Sportivo Italiano offered him the perfect opportunity for retirement, allowing him to continue playing football in a division that was less physically demanding.

At the conclusion of the 1963 tournament, feeling that his time in the sport had run its course and wishing to focus 100% on dentistry, Prado retired of professional football.

== Honours ==
River Plate

- Argentine Primera División: 1952, 1953, 1955, 1956, 1957
- Copa Ibarguren: 1952
- Copa Oro: 1957
