= Roberto Zárate =

Argentine footballer (1932–2013)

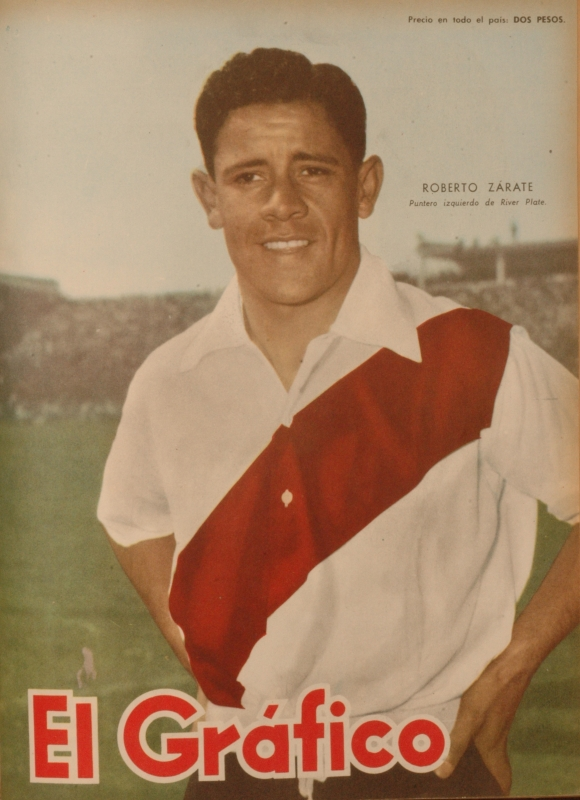
- Zárate with River Plate in 1956

Personal information
- Full name: Roberto Héctor Zárate
- Date of birth: 15 December 1932
- Place of birth: Buenos Aires, Argentina
- Date of death: 6 November 2013 (aged 80)
- Place of death: Buenos Aires, Argentina
- Position: Left winger

Youth career
- River Plate

Senior career*
Years	Team	Apps	(Gls)
1951–1961	River Plate	139	(61)
1961–1967	Banfield	215	(74)
1968–1969	Audax Italiano	57	(15)
Total		411	(150)

International career
1956–1963	Argentina	15	(5)
- * Club domestic league appearances and goals

Roberto Héctor Zárate (15 December 1932 – 6 November 2013) was an Argentine professional footballer who used to play as a forward, specifically as a left winger. Nicknamed ''El Mono'' (lit. 'The Monkey'), Zárate played in the historic River Plate team known as La Maquinita and he was also named in Argentina's squad for the qualification tournament for the 1958 FIFA World Cup.

== Club career ==
Zárate began his professional career at River Plate, making his first-division debut in 1950. In 1960, he moved to Banfield, where he remained until 1969. He won league titles with River in 1952, 1953, 1955, 1956, and 1957. He scored a total of 61 goals for River and was even the top scorer in one tournament (the 1957 edition). He played as a winger alongside Ángel Labruna and Félix Loustau.

== International career ==
Zárate also represented the Argentina national team on several occasions, playing 14 matches and scoring 5 goals, he was part of the squad for the 1956 South American Championship, the 1963 South American Championship and the qualification tournament for the 1958 FIFA World Cup.

== Personal life ==
Zárate was the father of the footballer Roberto Oscar Zárate, nicknamed Monito (Little Monkey).

== Honours ==
River Plate

- Argentine Primera División: 1952, 1953, 1955, 1956, 1957
- Copa Ibarguren: 1952
- Copa de Oro: 1957
- Copa Aldao: 1957

Banfield

- Primera División B: 1962

Argentina

- Copa America third place: 1956, 1963
