= Ricardo González (Paraguayan footballer) =

Paraguayan footballer (born 1945)

Personal information
- Full name: Ricardo González Rotela
- Date of birth: 7 February 1945 (age 81)
- Place of birth: Piribebuy, Paraguay
- Position: Defender

Senior career*
Years	Team	Apps	(Gls)
- Cerro Porteño
1968–1976	Elche	208	(1)
1976–1977	Levante	3	(0)

International career
1965–1968	Paraguay	15	(0)
- * Club domestic league appearances and goals

Ricardo González Rotela (born 7 February 1945) is a Paraguayan footballer. He played in 15 matches for the Paraguay national football team from 1965 to 1968. He was also part of Paraguay's squad for the 1967 South American Championship.
