= Almir (footballer, born 1938) =

Brazilian footballer (born 1938)

Personal information
- Full name: Almir da Silva
- Date of birth: 5 January 1938 (age 88)

International career
Years	Team	Apps	(Gls)
1960–1963	Brazil	7	(1)

Almir da Silva (born 5 January 1938), known as just Almir, is a Brazilian footballer. He played in seven matches for the Brazil national football team from 1960 to 1963. He was also part of Brazil's squad for the 1963 South American Championship.
