= Luis Doldán =

Paraguayan footballer (1938-2015)

Personal information
- Date of birth: 19 January 1938
- Date of death: 4 July 2015 (aged 77)
- Position: Forward

International career
Years	Team	Apps	(Gls)
1968	Paraguay	1	(0)

Luis Doldán (19 January 1938 – 4 July 2015) was a Paraguayan footballer. He played in one match for the Paraguay national football team in 1968. He was also part of Paraguay's squad for the 1959 South American Championship that took place in Argentina.
