= Cristóbal Mantilla =

Ecuadorian footballer (born 1949)

Personal information
- Date of birth: 28 November 1949 (age 76)

International career
Years	Team	Apps	(Gls)
1972–1979	Ecuador	14	(1)

Cristóbal Mantilla (born 28 November 1949) is an Ecuadorian footballer. He played in 14 matches for the Ecuador national football team from 1972 to 1979. He was also part of Ecuador's squad for the 1979 Copa América tournament.
