= Ausberto García =

Bolivian footballer (1934–2017)

Personal information
- Date of birth: 9 February 1934
- Date of death: 11 December 2017 (aged 83)
- Position: Forward

Senior career*
Years	Team	Apps	(Gls)
1957-1963	Jorge Wilstermann		
1964	Aurora		
1965-1968	Jorge Wilstermann		

International career
1963–1967	Bolivia	19	(5)
Medal record
Representing Bolivia
Copa América
Winner	1963 Bolivia
- * Club domestic league appearances and goals

Ausberto García (9 February 1934 – 11 December 2017) was a Bolivian footballer who played as a forward.

He took part in the 1959 (Argentina), 1963 and 1967 editions of the Copa America, winning the 1963 tournament on home soil.

== International career ==
Ausberto García played 19 games and scored 5 goals for Bolivia. His first cap and first goal was on 29 September 1957 during a 1958 FIFA World Cup qualification game against Chile.

García was in Bolivia's squad for the 1959 South American Championship, playing four games and scoring once (his second personal goal for Bolivia) against Brazil.

García was also in Bolivia's squad for the 1963 South American Championship that took place on home soil. During the tournament, he played five games and scored three times (his third, fourth and fifth personal goals for Bolivia) against Peru, Paraguay and Brazil as Bolivia won its first and only Copa America. The goal against Brazil was his last with Bolivia.

His last competition was the 1967 South American Championship where he played four games. The game against Chile on 1 February was his last cap with Bolivia.

== Death ==
García died on 11 December 2017, at the age of 83.
