= Nondas =

Brazilian footballer

Personal information
- Full name: Epaminondas Brilha
- Date of birth: 21 September 1941 (age 85)
- Place of birth: Mairiporã, Brazil
- Position: Right winger

Senior career*
Years	Team	Apps	(Gls)
1959–1961	Nacional-SP		
1962–1964	São Paulo	36	(18)
1965–1967	XV de Piracicaba		
1968	Catanduva		
1969–1974	União Bandeirante		
- * Club domestic league appearances and goals as of 9 October 2023

Epaminondas Brilha (born 21 September 1941), better known as Nondas, is a Brazilian former professional footballer who played as a right winger.

== Career ==
Skilled right winger, Nondas played for Nacional, São Paulo, XV de Piracicaba, Catanduvense and União Bandeirante. At São Pauo FC, he was considered lucky as he scored many goals when he came on as a substitute one of the most important being the victory goal against Real Madrid, in the 1963 Small Club World Cup.

After retiring, he worked at the company Metso Minerals in Sorocaba.

== Honours ==
São Paulo

- Small Club World Cup: 1963
