= 1956 Campeonato Uruguayo Primera División =

53rd season of the top-tier football league in Uruguay

Uruguayan Primera División
- Season: 1956
- Champions: Nacional (24th. title)
- Matches: 90
- Goals: 315 (3.5 per match)

Statistics of Primera División Uruguaya for the 1956 season.

== Overview ==
It was contested by 10 teams, and Nacional won the championship.

== League standings ==
Pos	Team	Pld	W	D	L	GF	GA	GD	Pts
1	Nacional	18	15	2	1	54	19	+35	32
2	Peñarol	18	13	3	2	50	17	+33	29
3	Cerro	18	10	4	4	42	30	+12	24
4	Defensor	18	6	6	6	34	33	+1	18
5	Montevideo Wanderers	18	3	9	6	16	23	−7	15
6	Liverpool	18	6	3	9	31	40	−9	15
7	Rampla Juniors	18	3	8	7	27	34	−7	14
8	Danubio	18	6	2	10	18	31	−13	14
9	Racing Montevideo	18	5	3	10	25	45	−20	13
10	Sud América	18	1	4	13	18	43	−25	6

Source: rsssf.com
