= Martín Pando =

Argentine footballer (1934–2021)

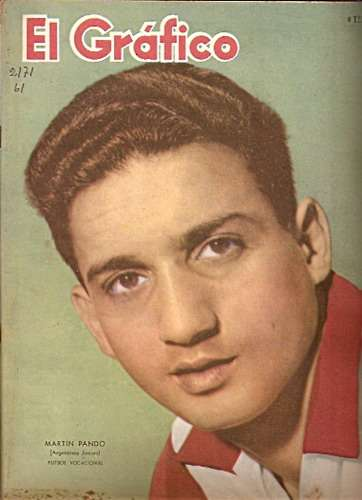
- Pando in 1962

Personal information
- Full name: Martín Esteban Pando
- Date of birth: 26 December 1934
- Place of birth: Buenos Aires, Argentina
- Date of death: 7 May 2021 (aged 86)
- Place of death: Buenos Aires
- Height: 1.59 m (5 ft 3 in)
- Position: Forward

Senior career*
Years	Team	Apps	(Gls)
1955-1957	Platense	34	(3)
1958–1961	Argentinos Juniors	105	(25)
1962–1964	River Plate	53	(6)
1965–1967	Lanús	77	(5)

International career
1960–1962	Argentina	11	(3)
- * Club domestic league appearances and goals

Martín Esteban Pando (26 December 1934 – 7 May 2021) was an Argentine footballer who played as a forward.

Pando started playing in 1955 at Platense in Buenos Aires before moving to Argentinos Juniors in 1958 and then River Plate in 1962. With River Plate he finished as runner-up in the Argentine league twice, in 1962 and 1963. In 1965 he joined Lanús, where he ended his career in 1967. In total he played 242 league matches and scored 37 goals in the Argentine league.

Pando also played for the Argentina national team in two 1962 FIFA World Cup qualifying matches against Ecuador played in December 1960. Once Argentina qualified for the tournament in Chile he was called up to the squad by manager Juan Carlos Lorenzo. At the tournament Argentina were eliminated in the group stage and Pando appeared only in the goalless draw against Hungary, in which he captained the team.

Pando died on 7 May 2021, aged 86.
