= Sérgio Lopes (footballer) =

Brazilian footballer (1941–2024)

Personal information
- Full name: Sérgio Gonçalves Lopes
- Date of birth: 11 January 1941
- Place of birth: Osasco, São Paulo, Brazil
- Date of death: 5 August 2024 (aged 83)
- Place of death: Florianópolis, Santa Catarina, Brazil
- Height: 1.90 m (6 ft 3 in)
- Position: Midfielder

Youth career
- São Paulo

Senior career*
Years	Team	Apps	(Gls)
1957–1961	São Paulo		
1961–1962	Internacional		
1963	São Paulo		
1964–1970	Grêmio	314	(54)
1971–1972	Atlético Paranaense		
1972	Portuguesa		
1973	Atlético Paranaense		
1974	Sampaio Corrêa		
1974–1976	Figueirense		

International career
1966	Brazil	2	(0)

Managerial career
- 1976: Figueirense
- 1977: Marcílio Dias
- 1979: Cascavel EC
- 1980: Brasil de Pelotas
- 1981: Cascavel EC
- 1981: Avaí
- 1982: Paysandu-SC
- 1982: Toledo
- 1982: Figueirense
- 1984: Hercílio Luz
- 1984: CA Rio Sul-SC
- 1985: Santa Cruz
- 1985: Comercial-PR
- 1986: Apucarana
- 1987: Paulista
- 1988: Avaí
- 1989: Atlético Paranaense
- 1989: Criciúma
- 1990: Figueirense
- 1990: Avaí
- 1990: Fortaleza
- 1991: Campo Mourão
- 1991–1992: Avaí
- 1992: Figueirense
- 1993: ABC
- 1995: ABC
- 1996: Jaraguá
- 1997: Figueirense
- 1997: Londrina
- 1998: Figueirense
- 1999: Matsubara
- 2000: Central
- 2000: América de Natal
- 2000: São Gonçalo-RN
- 2001: Ilhota-SC
- 2003: Guarani de Palhoça
- * Club domestic league appearances and goals

Sérgio Gonçalves Lopes (11 January 1941 – 5 August 2024) was a Brazilian professional football player and manager who played as a midfielder.

== Club career ==
Sérgio began his career with São Paulo FC youth team, and in 1957 he was promoted to the professional ranks, being part of the state champion squad. He was also a great highlight in the Pentagonal Tournament of Guadalajara in 1960. Sérgio was exactly 1.90 meters tall, an unusual height for the time, which earned him the nickname "fita métrica" (tape measure). Even though he was slender, he became a midfielder instead of a defender, due to his talent for distributing games with precise passes.

He was Gaucho champion with Internacional in 1961 and five more times with Grêmio, a club where he accumulated 314 appearances and 54 goals, being considered one of the greatest in history. He also played for Portuguesa, Atlético Paranaense, Sampaio Corrêa and Figueirense, where he was state champion in 1974.

== International career ==
Sérgio Lopes played with the number 10 shirt for the Brazil national team in two matches, in April 1966 for the Copa Bernardo O'Higgins against Chile, when football players from Rio Grande do Sul represented Brazil.

== Managerial career ==
Sérgio Lópes had a vast career as a coach, starting shortly after retiring as a player at Figueirense in 1976. However, it was at rival Avaí in 1988 that Sérgio Lopes achieved the first major triumph of his career, by winning the Campeonato Catarinense in 1988. In 1990, returned to Figueirense and achieved the feat of becoming a champion as a player and manager by winning the Copa Santa Catarina in 1990.

In 1993, at Natal-based ABC, he had the mission of replacing Erandy Montenegro in the final stretch of that year's championship, and again won a state tournament. He also had spells at Santa Cruz, Paulista, Athletico Paranaense and Londrina.

== Death ==
Lopes died from complications of cancer and Alzheimer's disease in Florianópolis, on 5 August 2024, at the age of 83.

== Honours ==
=== Player ===
São Paulo

- Campeonato Paulista: 1957
- Torneio Pentagonal Cidade de Guadalajara: 1960

Internacional

- Campeonato Gaúcho: 1961

Grêmio

- Campeonato Gaúcho: 1964, 1965, 1966, 1967, 1968
- Campeonato Citadino de Porto Alegre: 1964, 1965

Figueirense

- Campeonato Catarinense: 1974

Brazil

- Copa Bernardo O'Higgins: 1966

=== Manager ===
Avaí

- Campeonato Catarinense: 1988

Figueirense

- Copa Santa Catarina: 1990

ABC

- Campeonato Potiguar: 1993
