= Rolando Vargas (footballer) =

Bolivian footballer (born 1939)

Personal information
- Date of birth: 10 April 1939
- Date of death: 22 June 2025 (aged 86)

International career
Years	Team	Apps	(Gls)
1967	Bolivia	5	(0)

Rolando Vargas (10 April 1939 – 22 June 2025) was a Bolivian footballer. He played in five matches for the Bolivia national football team in 1967. He was also part of Bolivia's squad for the 1967 South American Championship.

Vargas died on 22 June 2025, at the age of 86.
