= Carlos Pineda Alvarado =

Ecuadorian footballer (1937–2000)

Personal information
- Date of birth: 21 February 1937
- Date of death: 6 April 2000 (aged 63)

International career
Years	Team	Apps	(Gls)
1963–1967	Ecuador	4	(1)

Carlos Pineda Alvarado (21 February 1937 – 6 April 2000) was an Ecuadorian footballer. He played in four matches for the Ecuador national football team from 1963 to 1967. He was also part of Ecuador's squad for the 1963 South American Championship.
