= Fernando Cônsul =

Brazilian footballer (born 1938)

Personal information
- Date of birth: 3 May 1938 (age 88)
- Position: Forward

International career
Years	Team	Apps	(Gls)
1963	Brazil	3	(1)

Fernando Cônsul (born 3 May 1938) is a Brazilian footballer. He played in three matches for the Brazil national football team in 1963. He was also part of Brazil's squad for the 1963 South American Championship.
