= Baiano (footballer, born 1939) =

Brazilian footballer (1939–2019)

Personal information
- Full name: Carmo David
- Date of birth: 25 July 1939
- Place of birth: Tabatinga, Brazil
- Date of death: 3 June 2019 (aged 79)
- Place of death: Matão, Brazil
- Position: Forward

Youth career
- –1957: Ferroviária

Senior career*
Years	Team	Apps	(Gls)
1957–1960	Ferroviária		
1961–1963	São Paulo	125	(61)
- * Club domestic league appearances and goals as of 2 September 2023

Carmo David (25 July 1939 – 3 June 2019), better known as Baiano, was a Brazilian former professional footballer who played as a forward.

== Career ==
Baiano only played for Ferroviária and São Paulo, where he scored 61 goals in 125 games. He retired early after passing a public tender. Baiano also was part of Aymoré Moreira's pre-list for the 1962 FIFA World Cup.

== Death ==
He died at age 79 at his home of natural causes.
