= Leonardo Palacios =

Ecuadorian footballer (1933–2026)

Personal information
- Date of birth: 2 April 1933
- Place of birth: Tena, Ecuador
- Date of death: 14 May 2026 (aged 93)

International career
Years	Team	Apps	(Gls)
1963	Ecuador	10	(1)

Leonardo Palacios (2 April 1933 – 14 May 2026) was an Ecuadorian footballer. He played in four matches for the Ecuador national football team in 1963. He was also part of Ecuador's squad for the 1963 South American Championship.

Palacios died on 14 May 2026, at the age of 93.
