= Vinicio Ron =

Ecuadorian footballer (born 1954)

Personal information
- Date of birth: 26 February 1954 (age 72)

International career
Years	Team	Apps	(Gls)
1976–1984	Ecuador	25	(2)

Vinicio Ron (born 26 February 1954) is an Ecuadorian footballer. He played in 25 matches for the Ecuador national football team from 1976 to 1984. He was also part of Ecuador's squad for the 1979 Copa América tournament.
