= Félix Lasso =

Ecuadorian footballer (1945-2016)

Personal information
- Full name: José Félix Lasso García
- Date of birth: 28 May 1945
- Place of birth: Guayaquil, Ecuador
- Date of death: 13 February 2016 (aged 70)
- Position: Forward

Senior career*
Years	Team	Apps	(Gls)
1962–1967	Barcelona SC		
1968	Universidad de Chile	30	(13)
1969	Barcelona SC		
1970–1974	Emelec		
1975–1976	El Nacional		
1977–1978	LDU Portoviejo		
1979	Barcelona SC		

International career
1966–1975	Ecuador	27	(7)
- * Club domestic league appearances and goals

José Félix Lasso García (28 May 1945 – 13 February 2016), known as Félix Lasso, was an Ecuadorian footballer who played for clubs of Ecuador and in Universidad de Chile in Chile.

== Teams ==
- (Ecuador) Barcelona 1962–1967
- Universidad de Chile 1968
- (Ecuador) Barcelona 1969
- (Ecuador) Emelec 1970–1974
- (Ecuador) El Nacional 1975–1976
- (Ecuador) LDU de Portoviejo 1977–1978
- (Ecuador) Barcelona 1979
