= Oswaldo Taurisano =

Brazilian footballer

Personal information
- Full name: Oswaldo José Taurisano
- Date of birth: 28 May 1936
- Place of birth: Campinas, Brazil
- Date of death: 23 July 2012 (aged 76)
- Position: Forward

International career
Years	Team	Apps	(Gls)
1963	Brazil	7	(3)

Oswaldo Taurisano (28 May 1936 – 23 July 2012) is a Brazilian footballer. He played in seven matches for the Brazil national football team in 1963. He was also part of Brazil's squad for the 1963 South American Championship.
