= Néstor Azón =

Ecuadorian footballer (1937–2025)

Personal information
- Date of birth: 11 November 1937
- Place of birth: El Guabo, Ecuador
- Date of death: 9 May 2025 (aged 87)

International career
| Years | Team | Apps | (Gls) |
| 1963 | Ecuador | 4 | (1) |

Néstor Azón (11 November 1937 – 9 May 2025) was an Ecuadorian footballer. He played in four matches for the Ecuador national football team in 1963. He was also part of Ecuador's squad for the 1963 South American Championship.

Azón died on 9 May 2025, at the age of 87.
