= 1963 Small Club World Cup =

Tournament details
- Host country: Venezuela
- Dates: 18–30 August
- Teams: 3 (from 3 associations)
- Venue: 1 (in 1 host city)

Final positions
- Champions: (Brazil) São Paulo (2nd title)

Tournament statistics
- Matches played: 5
- Goals scored: 12 (2.4 per match)
- Top scorer: 11 players scored 1 goal each (and 1 own goal)

The 1963 Small Club World Cup was the seventh edition of the Small Club World Cup, a tournament held in Venezuela between 1952 and 1957, in certain years between 1963 and 1970, and in 1975. It was played by three participants in double round robin format, and featured players like Evaristo, Hilderaldo Bellini, Cecilio Martinez, Custódio Pinto, Francisco Gento and Ferenc Puskás.

== Controversies ==
=== Di Stefano kidnapping ===
On the night of 24 August 1963, the Venezuelan revolutionary group Armed Forces of National Liberation (FALN), kidnapped the player Alfredo Di Stéfano (Real Madrid) at gunpoint from the Potomac Hotel, located in Caracas. The kidnapping received the codenamed "Julián Grimau", after the Spanish communist Julián Grimau García, was executed by firing squad in Spain, in April 1963, during Francisco Franco's dictatorship. At 27 August, three days later, Di Stéfano was released unharmed close to the Spanish embassy without a ransom being paid, and Di Stéfano stressed that his kidnappers had not mistreated him. Di Stéfano played in a match against São Paulo the day after he was released and received a standing ovation.

A Spanish movie entitled Real, La Película (Real, The Movie), which recounted these events, was released on 25 August 2005. In a bizarre publicity stunt at the premiere, kidnapper Paul del Rio, now a famous artist, and Di Stéfano were brought together for the first time since the abduction, 42 years before. Paul del Rio died on Caracas at the age of 72.

=== Bursts of gunfire during Sao Paulo vs Real Madrid ===
During the interval of August 28 match between São Paulo and Real Madrid, terrified fans invaded the pitch, after the Caracas police shot at protesters pro-FALN outside the stadium. Smoke bombs were used to disperse the public, one of them almost hitting defender De Sordi (São Paulo). The start of the second half was delayed by about 30 minutes.

== Participants ==
Team	Domestic league results
(Portugal) Porto	1962–63 Primeira Divisão runners-up
(Spain) Real Madrid	1962–63 La Liga winners
(Brazil) São Paulo	1963 Campeonato Paulista runners-up

== Matches ==
Aug 18

Porto (Portugal)	1–2	(Brazil) São Paulo
Jorge 35'	Report	Martinez 2'; Pagão 7'

Estadio Olímpico, Caracas
Referee: Isidro Trapole (Venezuela)

Aug 20

Real Madrid (Spain)	2–1	(Portugal) Porto
Amancio 26'; Muller 76'	Report	Pinto 41'

Estadio Olímpico, Caracas
Referee: Osorio (Portugal)

Aug 23

São Paulo (Brazil)	2–1	(Spain) Real Madrid
Pachín 12' (o.g.); Nondas 59'	Report	Evaristo 20'

Estadio Olímpico, Caracas
Referee: Benito Jackson (Venezuela)

Aug 25

Porto (Portugal)	1–2	(Spain) Real Madrid
Hernâni 67'	Report	Félix Ruiz 27'; Gento 35'

Estadio Olímpico, Caracas
Referee: Yañez (Venezuela)

Aug 28

Real Madrid (Spain)	0–0	(Brazil) São Paulo
	Report

Estadio Olímpico, Caracas
Referee: Isidro Trapote (Venezuela)

Sep 1

São Paulo (Brazil)	v	(Portugal) Porto

Estadio Olímpico, Caracas

The final match not played as São Paulo had secured the title due to the head-to-head results with Real Madrid

== Final standings ==
Team	Pts	P	W	D	L	GF	GA	GD
(Brazil) São Paulo	5	3	2	1	0	4	2	2
(Spain) Real Madrid	5	4	2	1	1	5	4	1
(Portugal) Porto	0	3	0	0	3	3	6	-3

== Topscorers ==
1 goal

- (Brazil) Evaristo
- (Brazil) Nondas
- (Brazil) Pagão
- (France) Lucien Muller
- (Paraguay) Cecilio Martinez
- (Portugal) Custódio Pinto
- (Portugal) Hernâni
- (Portugal) Joaquim Jorge
- (Spain) Amancio
- (Spain) Félix Ruiz
- (Spain) Francisco Gento

Own goal

- (Spain) Pachín

== Champion ==
1963 Small Club World Cup
(Second Brazilian Republic)
São Paulo
2nd. title
