= Jorge Bolaños (footballer) =

Ecuadorian footballer (1943-1996)

- Bolaños in 1969

Personal information
- Full name: Jorge Washington Bolaños Carrasco
- Date of birth: 26 September 1943
- Date of death: 24 May 1996 (aged 52)
- Position: Midfielder

International career
Years	Team	Apps	(Gls)
1963–1967	Ecuador	6	(2)

Jorge Washington Bolaños Carrasco (26 September 1943 — 24 May 1996) was an Ecuadorian footballer. He played in six matches for the Ecuador national football team from 1963 to 1967. He was also part of Ecuador's squad for the 1963 South American Championship.
