= Eusebio Escobar =

Colombian footballer (born 1936)

Personal information
- Full name: Eusebio Escobar Ramírez
- Date of birth: July 2, 1936 (age 90)
- Place of birth: Colombia

International career
Years	Team	Apps	(Gls)
1961–1962	Colombia	2	(1)

Eusebio Escobar Ramírez (born 2 July 1936) is a former Colombian footballer. He was a member of the Colombia national football team at the 1962 FIFA World Cup which was held in Chile, and played in two qualifying matches for the tournament. He is the last survivor of this team. Escobar is one of the all-time leading goal-scorers in the history of the Colombian league, scoring 159 goals during his career with Deportivo Cali, Atlético Bucaramanga, América de Cali, Deportivo Pereira, Deportes Quindío, Atlético Nacional, Independiente Medellín, and Deportivo Manizales.
