= Carlos Alberto Raffo =

Argentine footballer (1926–2013)

Personal information
- Full name: Carlos Alberto Raffo Vallaco
- Date of birth: 10 April 1926
- Place of birth: Buenos Aires, Argentina
- Date of death: 18 September 2013 (aged 87)
- Place of death: Guayaquil, Ecuador
- Position: Striker

Youth career
- Platense

Senior career*
Years	Team	Apps	(Gls)
1940–1952	Platense		
1952–1954	Argentina de Quito		
1954–1963	Emelec		(132)
1964	Everest		(6)
1965	9 de Octubre		(7)

International career
1959–1963	Ecuador	13	(10)
- * Club domestic league appearances and goals as of March 2008

Carlos Alberto Raffo Vallaco (April 10, 1926 – September 18, 2013) was an Argentine football striker who played international football for Ecuador.

== Club career ==
Born in Buenos Aires, Raffo started his playing career with Club Atlético Platense in Argentina. In 1952 he moved to Ecuador to play for Argentina de Quito (now Deportivo Quito). In 1954 he joined Emelec where he would play many seasons, scoring 132 goals. In his later years he played for Everest and 9 de Octubre.

Raffo is considered to be one of the greatest goalscorers in the history of the Ecuadorian football, but the precise number of goals he scored will probably never be known, due to poor record keeping in the early 1950s.

== International career ==
Raffo played international football for Ecuador between 1959 and 1963, he scored 10 goals in 13 games for his adoptive country. He was the top scorer in the Copa América in 1963. He is the only Ecuador player ever to achieve this feat to date.

== Death ==
Raffo suffered from health conditions and died at a Hospital in Guayaquil, Ecuador, aged 87.

== Honours ==
Season	Team	Title
1956	Emelec	Copa Guayaquil
1957	Emelec	Campeonato Ecuatoriano
1957	Emelec	Copa Guayaquil
1961	Emelec	Campeonato Ecuatoriano
1962	Emelec	Copa Guayaquil

- Topscorer in Copa América in 1963: 6 goals
- Topscorer in Campeonato Ecuatoriano 1963
