= Eugenio Méndez =

Chilean footballer (born 1941)

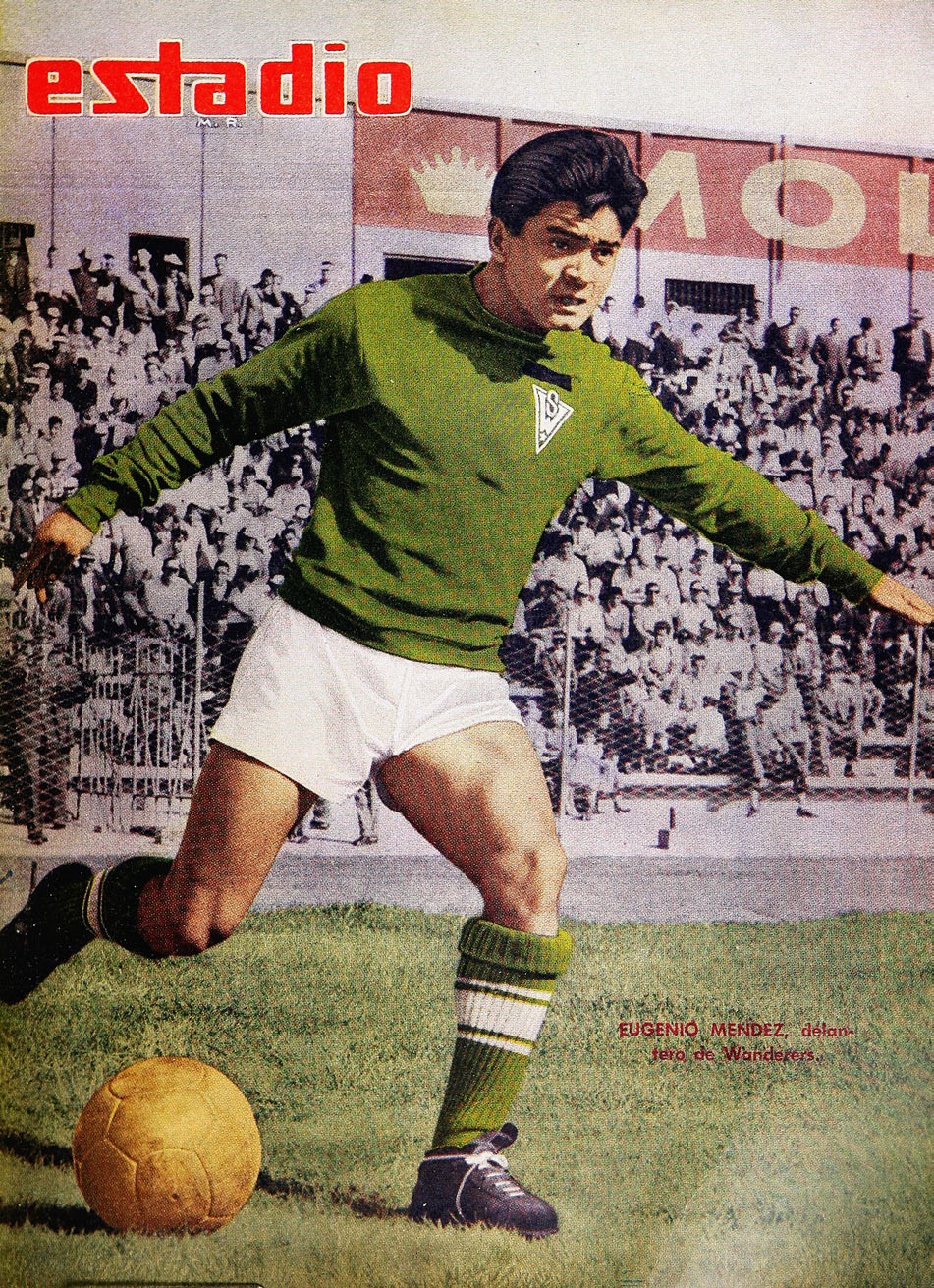

Personal information
- Full name: Eugenio Leonel Méndez Henríquez
- Date of birth: 23 November 1941 (age 84)
- Place of birth: Valparaíso, Chile
- Height: 1.67 m (5 ft 5 1/2 in)
- Position: Right winger

Youth career
- Huracán
- Lonquimay
- Unión Santa María
- Santiago Wanderers

Senior career*
Years	Team	Apps	(Gls)
1958–1967	Santiago Wanderers		
1968	Magallanes		
1969–1970	Santiago Wanderers		
1971	Deportes La Serena		
1972	Audax Italiano		
1973	Laguna		
1974	Aucas		
1974	Santiago Wanderers		
1975	San Luis		
1976	Jorge Wilstermann		
1977	Ayacucho Festaco		
1978	Independiente Unificada		

International career
1959	Chile U20		
1964–1965	Chile	4	(2)

Managerial career
- 1984: Destroyers
- 1985: CD Libertad
- 1989: Blooming (assistant)
- 1991: 25 de Junio
- 1992: Ferroviario de Santa Cruz
- 1993: CD Libertad
- 1995: Destroyers
- 1995: Deportivo Cooper
- 1996: CD Sport Boys
- 1996: Deportivo Cooper
- 1997: Ferroviario de Santa Cruz
- 1999: 25 de Junio
- 2005: Santa Cruz (women) (city team)
- 2008–2009: Santiago Wanderers U17
- * Club domestic league appearances and goals

Eugenio Leonel Méndez Henríquez (born 23 November 1941) is a Chilean former football winger who played professionally in Chile, Mexico, Ecuador and Bolivia.

== Club career ==
Born in Valparaíso, Méndez began playing football as a right winger with Santiago Wanderers. He made his Chilean league debut against Audax Italiano in 1959. After nine years with Wanderers, he joined Deportes Magallanes, as Wanderers won its second Chilean league title the same year. Méndez returned to Wanderers and played in the 1969 Copa Libertadores.

In 1973, Méndez moved abroad, joining Mexican Primera División side Club de Fútbol Laguna. Next, he played in Ecuador for Sociedad Deportiva Aucas before returning to Santiago Wanderers in 1974. A few seasons later, he moved to Bolivia where he finished his playing career.

== International career ==
Méndez represented Chile at youth level in 1959.

At senior level, Méndez appeared for the Chile national football team in the 1966 FIFA World Cup qualifying rounds, scoring two goals in a 7–2 win against Colombia on 1 August 1965. In total, he made 4 appearances for the national team from 1964 to 1965.

== Personal life ==
He is the older brother of Javier Méndez, who is also a Chilean former international footballer.

He was nicknamed Pastelito (Little Cake).

== Honours ==
Santiago Wanderers

- Copa Chile (2): 1959, 1961

Chile

- Copa del Pacífico (1): 1965
