= Flávio Minuano =

Brazilian footballer (born 1944)

Personal information
- Full name: Flávio Almeida da Fonseca
- Date of birth: 9 July 1944 (age 82)
- Place of birth: Porto Alegre, Brazil
- Height: 1.79 m (5 ft 10 in)
- Position: Striker

Youth career
- 1958–1961: Flamengo

Senior career*
| Years | Team | Apps | (Gls) |
| 1961–1964 | Internacional | 67 | (52) |
| 1965–1969 | Corinthians | 228 | (172) |
| 1969–1971 | Fluminense | 114 | (93) |
| 1972–1975 | Porto | 90 | (54) |
| 1975–1976 | Internacional | 49 | (16) |
| 1977 | Santos | | |
| 1977 | Pelotas | | |
| 1979 | Brasília | | |
| 1981 | Jorge Wilstermann | | |
| Total | | 548 | (387) |

International career
| 1963–1966 | Brazil | 17 | (10) |
- * Club domestic league appearances and goals

Flávio Almeida da Fonseca (born 9 July 1944, in Porto Alegre), best known as Flávio Minuano, is a Brazilian former professional footballer. He played as a forward for Fluminense, Internacional and Santos in the Campeonato Brasileiro and the Brazil national team.

== Career ==
- Internacional: 1961–1964
- Corinthians: 1964–1969
- Fluminense: 1969–1971
- Porto: 1972–1975
- Internacional: 1975–1976
- Santos: 1977
- Pelotas: 1977–1978
- Brasília: 1979
- Jorge Wilstermann: 1980

== Career statistics ==
=== Club ===
Appearances and goals by club, season and competition
| Club | Season | League | | |
| Club | Season | Division | Apps | Goals |
|---|---|---|---|---|
| FC Porto | 1971–72 | Primeira Divisão | 29 | 21 |
| FC Porto | 1972–73 | Primeira Divisão | 25 | 21 |
| FC Porto | 1973–74 | Primeira Divisão | 10 | 0 |
| FC Porto | 1974–75 | Primeira Divisão | 10 | 1 |

== Honours ==
Internacional

- Rio Grande do Sul State Championship: 1961, 1975, 1976

Fluminense

- Rio de Janeiro State Championship: 1969, 1971
- Série A: 1970

Internacional

- Série A: 1975 and 1976
