= Carlos Campos (footballer, born 1937) =

Chilean footballer (1937–2020)

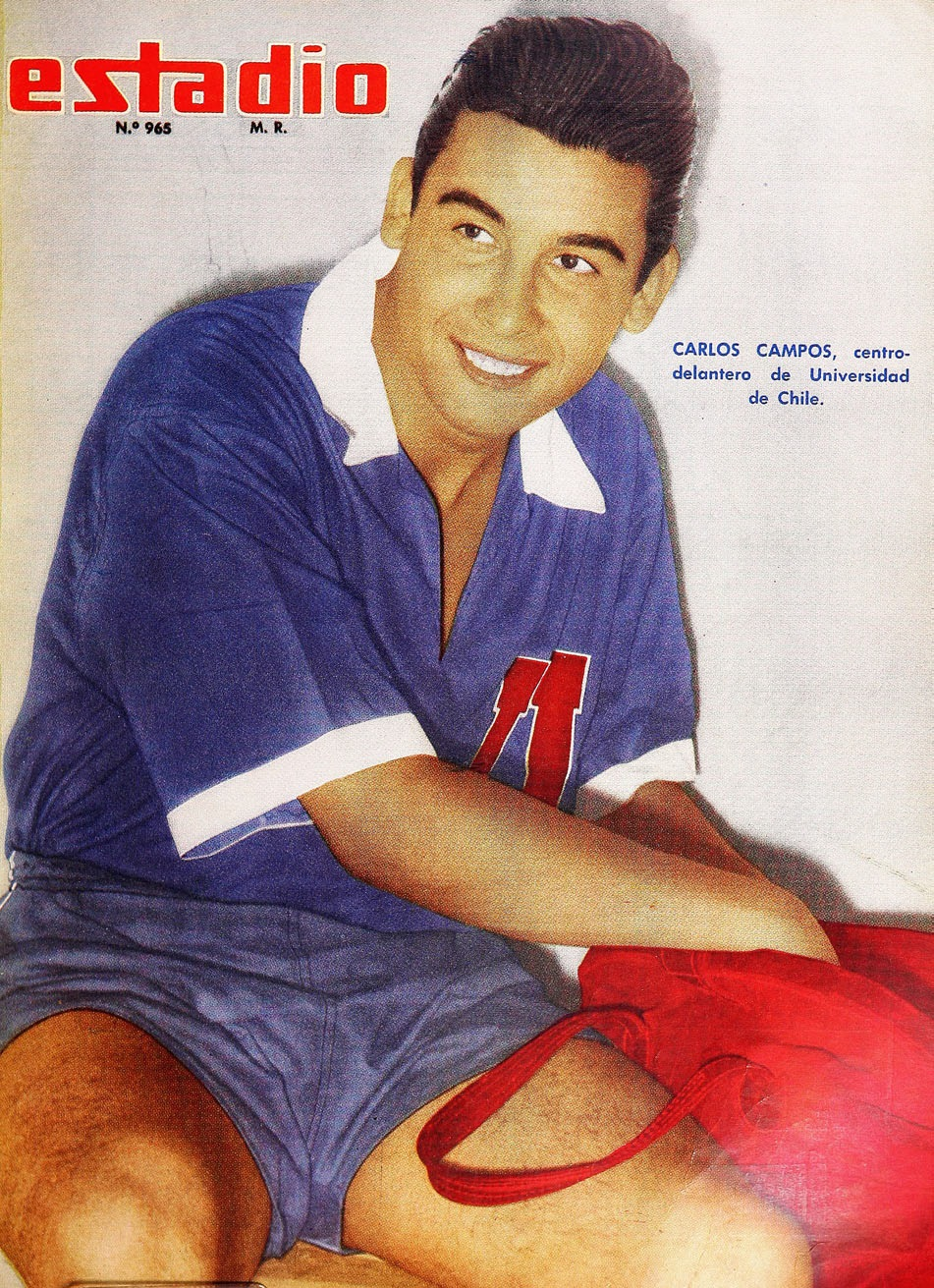
- Campos on the cover of Estadio in 1961

Personal information
- Full name: Carlos Héctor Campos Silva
- Date of birth: 14 February 1937
- Place of birth: Santiago, Chile
- Date of death: 11 November 2020 (aged 83)
- Place of death: Ovalle, Chile
- Height: 1.83 m (6 ft 0 in)
- Position: Striker

Youth career
- 1948–1956: Universidad de Chile

Senior career*
Years	Team	Apps	(Gls)
1956–1969	Universidad de Chile	259	(184)

International career
1960–1967	Chile	39	(18)

Managerial career
- 1983: Chile U20
Medal record
Men's football
Representing Chile
FIFA World Cup
Third place	1962 Chile
- * Club domestic league appearances and goals

Carlos Héctor Campos Silva (14 February 1937 – 11 November 2020) was a Chilean footballer. Campos played for Universidad de Chile. He scored 184 goals for the club, and 18 times for the Chile national team. Campos died in Ovalle on 11 November 2020, at the age of 83.

== Coaching career ==
Campos served as coach for the Chile national under-20 team at the 1983 South American Championship alongside Raúl Angulo.
