= Máximo Alcócer =

Bolivian footballer (1933-2014)

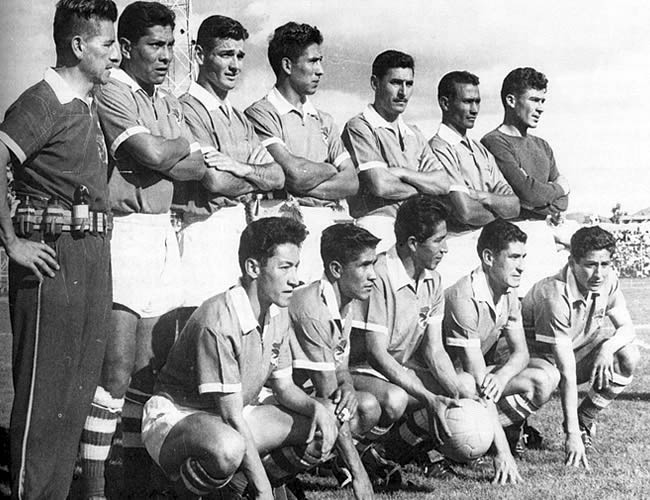
- The Bolivian team that won its first Copa América. Standing: Max Ramírez, Eduardo Espinoza, Wilfredo Camacho, Roberto Caínzo, Eulogio Vargas and Arturo López. Couching: Ramiro Blacutt, Máximo Alcócer, Víctor Agustín Ugarte, Ausberto García and Fortunato Castillo.

Personal information
- Date of birth: 15 April 1932
- Place of birth: Cochabamba, Bolivia
- Date of death: 13 May 2014 (aged 82)
- Place of death: North Carolina, U.S.
- Position: Forward

Senior career*
Years	Team	Apps	(Gls)
1954–1955	Unión Maestranza Viacha		
1956–1960	Jorge Wilstermann Cochabamba		
1961	Always Ready La Paz		
1961–1962	Deportivo Municipal de La Paz		
1963–1964	Club Aurora		

International career
1957–1963	Bolivia	22	(13)
Medal record
First place	South American Championship	1963
First place	Bolivian Primera División	1957
First place	Bolivian Primera División	1958
First place	Bolivian Primera División	1959
First place	Copa Simón Bolívar (Bolivia)	1960
First place	Copa Simón Bolívar (Bolivia)	1961
First place	Copa Simón Bolívar (Bolivia)	1963
- * Club domestic league appearances and goals

Máximo Luis Alcócer (15 April 1933 – 13 May 2014) was a Bolivian footballer whose career lasted for almost ten years. His career debut began in 1954. He retired in 1964.

== Club career ==
- Club Union Maestranza: Alcócer began his professional career with Club Union Maestranza, a team known for its competitive spirit in Bolivian football. His time here showcased his emerging talent as a forward.
- Club Jorge Wilstermann: His move to Club Jorge Wilstermann marked the peak of his club career. Here, he became a key player, leading the team to several national championships and earning the adoration of fans.
- Club Aurora: Before retiring, Alcócer also played for Club Aurora, contributing his experience and skill to the team and helping to mentor younger players.

== International career ==
With the national team of Bolivia he won the 1963 South American Championship and scored the winning goal versus Brazil in Bolivia's final match of the tournament in Cochabamba. He earned a total of 22 caps, scoring 13 goals.

== Personal life ==
=== Post-Retirement ===
After retiring from professional football in 1964, Alcócer led a life away from the public eye. Details about his personal life, including his family and off-field interests, remain less documented.

=== Death ===
Alcócer died on May 13, 2014, in North Carolina, United States. He was 81 years old.
