= 1963 South American Championship =

Football tournament

Tournament details
- Host country: Bolivia
- Dates: 10–31 March
- Teams: 7 (from 1 confederation)
- Venues: 2 (in 2 host cities)

Final positions
- Champions: Bolivia (1st title)
- Runners-up: Paraguay
- Third place: Argentina
- Fourth place: Brazil

Tournament statistics
- Matches played: 21
- Goals scored: 91 (4.33 per match)
- Top scorer(s): (Ecuador) Carlos Alberto Raffo (6 goals)

The 1963 South American Championship was held in Bolivia between 10 and 31 March 1963. It was won by Bolivia with Paraguay second. This is, so far, Bolivia's only Copa America title.

== Squads ==
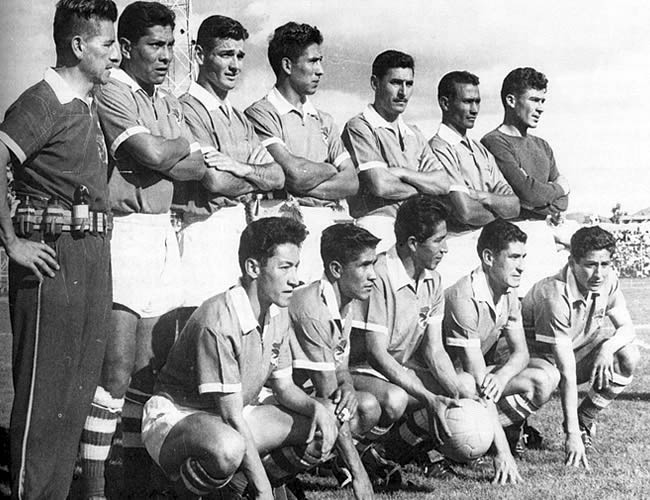
The Bolivia team won its first Cup

For a complete list of participating squads see: 1963 South American Championship squads

== Venues ==
La Paz	Cochabamba
Estadio Hernando Siles	Estadio Félix Capriles
Capacity: 51,000	Capacity: 36,000
1963 South American Championship is located in Bolivia

== Final round ==
Team	Pld	W	D	L	GF	GA	GD	Pts
Bolivia	6	5	1	0	19	13	+6	11
Paraguay	6	4	1	1	13	7	+6	9
Argentina	6	3	1	2	15	10	+5	7
Brazil	6	2	1	3	12	13	−1	5
Peru	6	2	1	3	8	11	−3	5
Ecuador	6	1	2	3	14	18	−4	4
Colombia	6	0	1	5	10	19	−9	1

Chile was not invited due to the Lauca River conflict with Bolivia.

Uruguay withdrew due to the designation of La Paz as a tournament site.

Venezuela did not enter.

10 March 1963

Bolivia	4–4	Ecuador
López 16'; Castillo 27'; Alcócer 55'; Camacho 80'		Raffo 30'; Raymondi 44', 50'; Bolaños 47'

Hernando Siles, La Paz
Attendance: 15,000
Referee: Arturo Yamasaki (Peru)

10 March 1963

Argentina	4–2	Colombia
Zárate 3', 90'; Fernández 11'; Rodríguez 87'		Campillo 4'; Aceros 37'

Félix Capriles, Cochabamba
Attendance: 18,000
Referee: João Etzel Filho (Brazil)

10 March 1963

Brazil	1–0	Peru
Flávio 16'

Félix Capriles, Cochabamba
Attendance: 18,000
Referee: José Dimas Larrosa (Paraguay)

13 March 1963

Peru	2–1	Argentina
Tenemás 62'; Gallardo 76'		Zárate 57'

Félix Capriles, Cochabamba
Attendance: 10,000
Referee: José Dimas Larrosa (Paraguay)

14 March 1963

Paraguay	3–1	Ecuador
Zárate 11'; Cabrera 57'; Quiñónez 82'		Raffo 32'

Hernando Siles, La Paz
Attendance: 15,000
Referee: Luis Ventre (Argentina)

14 March 1963

Brazil	5–1	Colombia
Flávio 7', 82'; Marco Antônio 31'; Oswaldo 56'; Fernando 83'		Gamboa 85'

Hernando Siles, La Paz
Attendance: 15,000
Referee: Tomás Antruejo (Bolivia)

17 March 1963

Bolivia	2–1	Colombia
Alcócer 22', 40'		Botero 4'

Félix Capriles, Cochabamba
Attendance: 18,000
Referee: Arturo Yamasaki (Peru)

17 March 1963

Peru	2–1	Ecuador
León 34'; Mosquera 43'		Raffo 20'

Hernando Siles, La Paz
Attendance: 8,000
Referee: Ovidio Orrego (Colombia)

17 March 1963

Paraguay	2–0	Brazil
Zárate 17'; Ayala 83'

Hernando Siles, La Paz
Attendance: 8,000
Referee: Tomás Antruejo (Bolivia)

20 March 1963

Paraguay	3–2	Colombia
Eladio Zárate 10'; Arambulo 50'; Martinez 89'		Campillo 27'; Gamboa 82'

Félix Capriles, Cochabamba
Attendance: 10,000
Referee: Luis Ventre (Argentina)

20 March 1963

Argentina	4–2	Ecuador
Savoy 34', 53', 90'; Rodríguez 58'		Pineda 32'; Palacios 49'

Félix Capriles, Cochabamba
Attendance: 20,000
Referee: Arturo Yamasaki (Peru)

21 March 1963

Bolivia	3–2	Peru
Camacho 14'; Alcócer 49'; García 57'		Gallardo 40'; León 80'

Hernando Siles, La Paz
Attendance: 20,000
Referee: João Etzel Filho (Brazil)

24 March 1963

Peru	1–1	Colombia
Gallardo 25'		González 33'

Hernando Siles, La Paz
Attendance: 10,000
Referee: Luis Ventre (Argentina)

24 March 1963

Argentina	3–0	Brazil
Rodríguez 3'; Savoy 33'; Juárez 86'

Hernando Siles, La Paz
Attendance: 30,000
Referee: Arturo Yamasaki (Peru)

24 March 1963

Bolivia	2–0	Paraguay
Castillo 17'; García 88'

Félix Capriles, Cochabamba
Attendance: 18,000
Referee: José Dimas Larrosa (Paraguay)

27 March 1963

Brazil	2–2	Ecuador
Oswaldo 5', 60'		Azón 84'; Raffo 90'

Félix Capriles, Cochabamba
Attendance: 20,000
Referee: José Dimas Larrosa (Paraguay)

27 March 1963

Paraguay	4–1	Peru
Martínez 5', 25'; Cabrera 45'; Zárate 77'		Gallardo 70'

Félix Capriles, Cochabamba
Attendance: 20,000
Referee: Luis Ventre (Argentina)

28 March 1963

Bolivia	3–2	Argentina
Castillo 12'; Blacut 32'; Camacho 88'		Rodríguez 27', 34'

Hernando Siles, La Paz
Attendance: 20,000
Referee: Arturo Yamasaki (Peru)

31 March 1963

Ecuador	4–3	Colombia
Raymondi 30'; Raffo 37', 88'; Bolaños 53'		Aceros 46'; Botero 68'; González 75'

Hernando Siles, La Paz
Attendance: 15,000
Referee: José Dimas Larrosa (Paraguay)

31 March 1963

Argentina	1–1	Paraguay
Lallana 58'		Cabrera 33'

Hernando Siles, La Paz
Attendance: 15,000
Referee: Arturo Yamasaki (Peru)

31 March 1963

Bolivia	5–4	Brazil
Ugarte 29', 69'; Camacho 43'; García 49'; Alcócer 57'	Report	Flávio 22', 38'; Marco Antônio 82'; Almir 87'

Félix Capriles, Cochabamba
Attendance: 25,000
Referee: Ovidio Orrego (Colombia)

== Result ==
1963 South American Championship champions

Bolivia
First title

== Goal scorers ==
With six goals, Carlos Alberto Raffo of Ecuador is the top scorer in the tournament. In total, 91 goals were scored by 40 different players, with none of them credited as own goal.

6 goals

- (Ecuador) Carlos Alberto Raffo

5 goals

- (Argentina) Mario Rodríguez
- (Bolivia) Máximo Alcócer
- (Brazil) Flávio Minuano

4 goals

- (Argentina) Raúl Savoy
- (Bolivia) Wilfredo Camacho
- (Paraguay) Eladio Zárate
- (Peru) Alberto Gallardo

3 goals

- (Argentina) Roberto Héctor Zárate
- (Bolivia) Ausberto García
- (Bolivia) Fortunato Castillo
- (Brazil) Oswaldo Taurisano
- (Ecuador) Enrique Raymondi
- (Paraguay) Cecilio Martinez
- (Paraguay) César Cabrera

2 goals

- (Bolivia) Víctor Ugarte
- (Brazil) Marco Antônio
- (Colombia) Alonso Botero
- (Colombia) Carlos Campillo
- (Colombia) Delio Gamboa
- (Colombia) Herman Aceros
- (Ecuador) Jorge Bolaños
- (Peru) Pedro Pablo León

1 goal

- (Argentina) Ernesto Humberto Juárez
- (Argentina) Jorge Hugo Fernández
- (Argentina) Juan Carlos Lallana
- (Bolivia) Ramiro Blacut
- (Bolivia) Renán López
- (Brazil) Almir Da Silva
- (Brazil) Fernando Consul
- (Colombia) Francisco González
- (Colombia) Héctor González
- (Ecuador) Carlos Pineda
- (Ecuador) Leonardo Palacios
- (Ecuador) Néstor Azón
- (Paraguay) Félix Arambulo
- (Paraguay) Oppe Quiñónez
- (Paraguay) Pelayo Ayala
- (Peru) Enrique Tenemás
- (Peru) Nemesio Mosquera
