= Enrique Raymondi =

Ecuadorian footballer (born 1937)

Personal information
- Full name: Enrique Arturo Raymondi Contreras
- Date of birth: 5 December 1937 (age 88)
- Place of birth: Guayaquil, Ecuador

International career
Years	Team	Apps	(Gls)
1963	Ecuador	5	(3)

Enrique Raymondi (born 5 December 1937) is an Ecuadorian footballer. He played in five matches for the Ecuador national football team in 1963, scoring three goals. He was also part of Ecuador's squad for the 1963 South American Championship.
