= 1956 Argentine Primera División =

65th season of top-tier football league in Argentina

Primera División
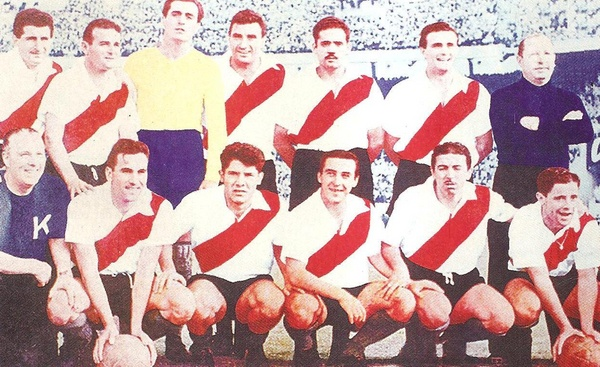
- River Plate, champions
- Season: 1956
- Champions: River Plate (13th title)
- Promoted: Argentinos Juniors
- Relegated: Chacarita Juniors
- Top goalscorer: (Argentina) Juan A. Castro (Argentina) Ernesto Grillo (17 goals each)

The 1956 Argentine Primera División was the 65th season of top-flight football in Argentina. The season began on April 15 and ended on December 2.

River Plate achieved its 13th league title.

== League standings ==
Pos	Team	Pld	W	D	L	GF	GA	GD	Pts
1	River Plate	30	17	9	4	61	32	+29	43
2	Lanús	30	15	11	4	59	37	+22	41
3	Boca Juniors	30	16	8	6	56	39	+17	40
4	Racing	30	14	11	5	53	32	+21	39
5	Vélez Sársfield	30	13	11	6	48	44	+4	37
6	Rosario Central	30	11	8	11	49	46	+3	30
6	Independiente	30	12	6	12	44	42	+2	30
8	San Lorenzo	30	11	7	12	41	45	−4	29
9	Ferro Carril Oeste	30	10	7	13	44	49	−5	27
10	Newell's Old Boys	30	9	8	13	44	48	−4	26
10	Gimnasia y Esgrima (LP)	30	7	12	11	50	59	−9	26
12	Estudiantes (LP)	30	7	9	14	38	46	−8	23
12	Huracán	30	7	9	14	45	59	−14	23
14	Argentinos Juniors	30	7	8	15	45	60	−15	22
14	Tigre	30	7	8	15	44	61	−17	22
14	Chacarita Juniors	30	7	8	15	32	54	−22	22
