= 1963 South American Championship squads =

List of footballers

These are the squads for the countries that played in the 1963 South American Championship. The participating countries were Argentina, Bolivia, Brazil, Colombia, Ecuador, Paraguay and Peru. Chile and Uruguay withdrew from the tournament. The teams plays in a single round-robin tournament, earning two points for a win, one point for a draw, and zero points for a loss.

== Argentina ==
Head Coach: Horacio Amable Torres (Argentina)

No.	Pos.	Player	Date of birth (age)	Caps	Goals	Club
—	DF	Rafael Albrecht	23 August 1941 (aged 21)	5	0	(Argentine Football Association) San Lorenzo
—	GK	Edgardo Norberto Andrada	2 January 1939 (aged 24)	3	0	(Argentine Football Association) Rosario Central
—	DF	Norberto Claudio Bautista	30 December 1940 (aged 22)	0	0	(Argentine Football Association) Rosario Central
—	MF	Raúl Bernao	5 November 1941 (aged 21)	0	0	(Argentine Football Association) Independiente
—	DF	Néstor Lucas Cardoso	17 November 1935 (aged 27)	3	0	(Argentine Football Association) Rosario Central
—	DF	Roque Ditro	17 August 1936 (aged 26)	0	0	(Argentine Football Association) River Plate
—	FW	Jorge Hugo Fernández	24 February 1942 (aged 21)	0	0	(Argentine Football Association) Atlanta
—	MF	Enrique Santiago Fernández	21 March 1944 (aged 18)	0	0	(Argentine Football Association) Rosario Central
—	DF	Roberto Ferreiro	25 April 1935 (aged 27)	1	0	(Argentine Football Association) Independiente
—	MF	Carlos Griguol	4 September 1934 (aged 28)	2	0	(Argentine Football Association) Atlanta
—	FW	Ernesto Juárez	16 December 1934 (aged 28)	3	0	(Argentine Football Association) Huracán
—	FW	Juan Carlos Lallana	24 December 1938 (aged 24)	0	0	(Argentine Football Association) Argentinos Juniors
—	DF	Óscar Raimundo Martín	23 June 1934 (aged 28)	0	0	(Argentine Football Association) Racing Club
—	FW	César Luis Menotti	22 October 1938 (aged 24)	3	0	(Argentine Football Association) Rosario Central
—	MF	José Mesiano	1 May 1942 (aged 20)	0	0	(Argentine Football Association) Argentinos Juniors
—	DF	Rubén Marino Navarro	30 March 1933 (aged 29)	22	0	(Argentine Football Association) Independiente
—	GK	Juan Alberto Oleinicki		0	0	(Argentine Football Association) Estudiantes (LP)
—	FW	Mario Rodríguez	20 October 1937 (aged 25)	3	0	(Argentine Football Association) Independiente
—	MF	Oscar Rossi	27 July 1930 (aged 32)	15	0	(Argentine Football Association) San Lorenzo
—	MF	Raúl Savoy	11 November 1940 (aged 22)	0	0	(Argentine Football Association) Chacarita Juniors
—	DF	José Ricardo Vásquez	7 December 1940 (aged 22)	0	0	(Argentine Football Association) Chacarita Juniors
—	FW	Roberto Zárate	15 December 1932 (aged 30)	8	2	(Argentine Football Association) Banfield

== Bolivia ==
Head Coach: (Brazil) Danilo Alvim

No.	Pos.	Player	Date of birth (age)	Caps	Goals	Club
—	MF	Atilio Aguirre		4	0	(Bolivian Football Federation) Deportivo Municipal
—	FW	Máximo Alcócer	15 April 1933 (aged 29)	4	2	(Bolivian Football Federation) Aurora
—	GK	Isaac Álvarez	16 July 1933 (aged 29)	0	0	(Bolivian Football Federation) 31 de Octubre
—	MF	Abdúl Aramayo	4 September 1934 (aged 28)	5	0	(Bolivian Football Federation) Chaco Petrolero
—	FW	Ramiro Blacutt	3 January 1944 (aged 19)	0	0	(Argentine Football Association) Ferro Carril Oeste
—	DF	Roberto Cainzo	14 April 1931 (aged 31)	0	0	(Bolivian Football Federation) Deportivo Municipal
—	MF	Wilfredo Camacho	21 June 1935 (aged 27)	6	0	(Bolivian Football Federation) Deportivo Municipal
—	MF	Carlos Cárdenas	24 January 1934 (aged 29)	0	0	(Bolivian Football Federation) The Strongest
—	MF	Fortunato Castillo	16 March 1939 (aged 23)	0	0	(Bolivian Football Federation) Chaco Petrolero
—	DF	Eduardo Espinoza	9 January 1934 (aged 29)	0	0	(Bolivian Football Federation) 31 de Octubre
—	FW	Ausberto García	9 February 1934 (aged 29)	4	1	(Bolivian Football Federation) Jorge Wilstermann
—	FW	Jaime Herbas	25 September 1941 (aged 21)	0	0	(Bolivian Football Federation) Jorge Wilstermann
—	MF	Jesús Herbas	2 February 1940 (aged 23)	0	0	(Bolivian Football Federation) Jorge Wilstermann
—	GK	Arturo López	20 May 1935 (aged 27)	6	0	(Bolivian Football Federation) Chaco Petrolero
—	FW	Renán López	31 October 1939 (aged 23)	6	0	(Bolivian Football Federation) Jorge Wilstermann
—	DF	Hugo Palenque	1 December 1937 (aged 25)	0	0	(Bolivian Football Federation) 31 de Octubre
—	FW	Edgar Quinteros	19 July 1940 (aged 22)	0	0	(Bolivian Football Federation) San José
—	MF	Máximo Ramírez	9 June 1933 (aged 29)	5	0	(Bolivian Football Federation) The Strongest
—	DF	Arturo Torres	21 December 1939 (aged 23)	0	0	(Bolivian Football Federation) Deportivo Municipal
—	FW	Víctor Ugarte	5 May 1926 (aged 36)	26	7	(Bolivian Football Federation) Bolivar
—	MF	Eulogio Vargas	21 March 1931 (aged 31)	0	0	(Bolivian Football Federation) Chaco Petrolero
—	DF	Oscar Villarroel	27 February 1944 (aged 19)	0	0	(Bolivian Football Federation) Deportivo Municipal
—	DF	Mario Zabalaga	4 March 1938 (aged 25)	0	0	(Bolivian Football Federation) Jorge Wilstermann

== Brazil ==
Head Coach: (Brazil) Aymoré Moreira

No.	Pos.	Player	Date of birth (age)	Caps	Goals	Club
—	FW	Almir	5 January 1938 (aged 25)	2	0	(Colombian Football Federation) Millonarios
—	FW	Altamiro	15 April 1940 (aged 22)	0	0	(Brazilian Football Confederation) São Cristóvão
—	MF	Amauri Horta	21 August 1942 (aged 20)	0	0	(Brazilian Football Confederation) Comercial-SP
—	FW	Amaury Silva	6 March 1942 (aged 21)	0	0	(Brazilian Football Confederation) Guarani
—	DF	Ari	18 August 1941 (aged 21)	1	0	(Brazilian Football Confederation) Corinthians
—	DF	Cláudio Danni	22 February 1942 (aged 21)	0	0	(Brazilian Football Confederation) Corinthians
—	FW	Fernando Cônsul	3 May 1938 (aged 24)	0	0	(Brazilian Football Confederation) America-RJ
—	FW	Flávio Minuano	8 July 1944 (aged 18)	1	1	(Brazilian Football Confederation) Internacional
—	DF	Geraldino	11 January 1940 (aged 23)	1	0	(Brazilian Football Confederation) Cruzeiro
—	MF	Ílton Chaves	28 March 1937 (aged 25)	1	1	(Brazilian Football Confederation) América Mineiro
—	MF	Ílton Vaccari	25 October 1934 (aged 28)	3	1	(Brazilian Football Confederation) Guarani
—	DF	Jorge	20 July 1939 (aged 23)	1	0	(Brazilian Football Confederation) America-RJ
—	GK	Marcial	3 June 1941 (aged 21)	1	0	(Brazilian Football Confederation) Atlético Mineiro
—	MF	Marco Antônio	26 December 1940 (aged 22)	1	0	(Brazilian Football Confederation) América Mineiro
—	DF	Mário Tito	6 November 1941 (aged 21)	0	0	(Brazilian Football Confederation) Bangu
—	DF	Massinha	7 September 1939 (aged 23)	1	0	(Brazilian Football Confederation) Cruzeiro
—	FW	Oswaldo	28 May 1936 (aged 26)	1	0	(Brazilian Football Confederation) Guarani
—	DF	Píter	24 April 1940 (aged 22)	0	0	(Brazilian Football Confederation) Comercial-SP
—	DF	Procópio	21 March 1939 (aged 23)	1	0	(Brazilian Football Confederation) Atlético Mineiro
—	GK	Silas Pereira	12 September 1934 (aged 28)	0	0	(Brazilian Football Confederation) Santos
—	MF	Tião Macalé	23 September 1936 (aged 26)	1	0	(Brazilian Football Confederation) Guarani
—	DF	William	25 June 1933 (aged 29)	1	0	(Brazilian Football Confederation) Atlético Mineiro

== Colombia ==
Head Coach: (Colombia) Gabriel Ochoa Uribe

No.	Pos.	Player	Date of birth (age)	Caps	Goals	Club
—	FW	Germán Aceros	30 September 1938 (aged 24)	3	1	(Colombian Football Federation) Deportivo Cali
—	DF	Aníbal Alzate	31 January 1933 (aged 30)	2	0	(Colombian Football Federation) Deportes Tolima
—	DF	Carlos Aponte	24 January 1939 (aged 24)	0	0	(Colombian Football Federation) Santa Fe
—	FW	Carlos Arango	31 January 1928 (aged 35)	11	9	(Colombian Football Federation) Millonarios
—	MF	Conrado Arango		0	0	(Colombian Football Federation) Millonarios
—	FW	Jairo Arias	2 November 1938 (aged 24)	1	0	(Colombian Football Federation) Once Caldas
—	FW	Alonso Botero		0	0	(Colombian Football Federation) Once Caldas
—	FW	Carlos Campillo		0	0	(Colombian Football Federation) Millonarios
—	MF	Marcos Coll	23 August 1935 (aged 27)	6	1	(Colombian Football Federation) América de Cali
—	FW	Delio Gamboa	28 January 1936 (aged 27)	7	3	(Colombian Football Federation) Millonarios
—	FW	Francisco González	18 May 1936 (aged 26)	0	0	(Colombian Football Federation) Independiente Medellín
—	MF	Gonzalo González		0	0	(Colombian Football Federation) Santa Fe
—	FW	Héctor González	7 July 1937 (aged 25)	2	0	(Colombian Football Federation) Santa Fe
—	DF	Jaime Gonzalez	1 April 1938 (aged 24)	3	0	(Colombian Football Federation) América de Cali
—	DF	Óscar López	2 April 1939 (aged 23)	3	0	(Colombian Football Federation) Once Caldas
—	DF	Orlando Marín	23 September 1942 (aged 20)	0	0	(Colombian Football Federation) Once Caldas
—	GK	Senén Mosquera	8 February 1938 (aged 25)	1	0	(Colombian Football Federation) Millonarios
—	FW	Saúl Salla		0	0	(Colombian Football Federation) Deportivo Cali
—	DF	Joaquín Sánchez		0	0	(Colombian Football Federation) Deportivo Cali
—	MF	Rolando Serrano	13 November 1938 (aged 24)	2	0	(Colombian Football Federation) América de Cali
—	MF	Jaime Silva	10 October 1935 (aged 27)	1	0	(Colombian Football Federation) Santa Fe
—	GK	Adelmo Vivas	1 March 1934 (aged 29)	0	0	(Colombian Football Federation) Deportivo Pereira

== Ecuador ==
Head Coach: (Ecuador) Fausto Montalván

No.	Pos.	Player	Date of birth (age)	Caps	Goals	Club
—	GK	Pablo Ansaldo	2 March 1935 (aged 28)	0	0	(Ecuadorian Football Federation) Barcelona SC
—	MF	Néstor Azón	11 November 1937 (aged 25)	0	0	(Ecuadorian Football Federation) Everest
—	FW	José Balseca	18 July 1933 (aged 29)	19	1	(Ecuadorian Football Federation) Emelec
—	MF	Jorge Bolaños	26 September 1943 (aged 19)	0	0	(Ecuadorian Football Federation) Emelec
—	DF	Miguel Bustamante	17 February 1939 (aged 24)	0	0	(Ecuadorian Football Federation) Patria
—	FW	Clímaco Cañarte	5 February 1936 (aged 27)	11	1	(Ecuadorian Football Federation) Barcelona SC
—	DF	Patricio Echevarría	19 December 1938 (aged 24)	0	0	(Ecuadorian Football Federation)
—	DF	Jaime Galarza	7 November 1934 (aged 28)	6	0	(Ecuadorian Football Federation) Patria
—	FW	Pedro Gando	20 July 1936 (aged 26)	0	0	(Ecuadorian Football Federation) Everest
—	DF	José Jhonson	3 September 1939 (aged 23)	0	0	(Ecuadorian Football Federation) Everest
—	FW	Armando Larrea	11 May 1943 (aged 19)	0	0	(Ecuadorian Football Federation) LDU Quito
—	DF	Vicente Lecaro	8 June 1936 (aged 26)	0	0	(Ecuadorian Football Federation) Emelec
—	DF	Luciano Macías	28 May 1935 (aged 27)	3	0	(Ecuadorian Football Federation) Barcelona SC
—	GK	Hugo Mejía	25 November 1931 (aged 31)	1	0	(Ecuadorian Football Federation) Everest
—	FW	Bolívar Merizalde	26 November 1941 (aged 21)	0	0	(Ecuadorian Football Federation) Emelec
—	FW	Leonardo Palacios	2 April 1933 (aged 29)	4	0	(Ecuadorian Football Federation) Everest
—	MF	Carlos Pineda	21 February 1937 (aged 26)	0	0	(Ecuadorian Football Federation) Emelec
—	DF	Alfonso Quijano	8 November 1941 (aged 21)	0	0	(Ecuadorian Football Federation) Barcelona SC
—	FW	Carlos Alberto Raffo	10 April 1926 (aged 36)	4	2	(Ecuadorian Football Federation) Emelec
—	FW	Enrique Raymondi	5 December 1937 (aged 25)	0	0	(Ecuadorian Football Federation) Emelec
—	MF	Ruperto Reeves	12 February 1934 (aged 29)	3	0	(Ecuadorian Football Federation) Barcelona SC

== Paraguay ==
Head Coach: (Uruguay) Ondino Viera

No.	Pos.	Player	Date of birth (age)	Caps	Goals	Club
—	DF	Baldomero Amarilla	24 August 1935 (aged 27)	2	0	(Paraguayan Football Association) Guaraní
—	FW	Félix Arámbulo	7 January 1942 (aged 21)	1	0	(Paraguayan Football Association) Olimpia
—	FW	Juan Ayala		1	0	(Paraguayan Football Association) Libertad
—	DF	Vicente Bobadilla	5 April 1938 (aged 24)	3	0	(Paraguayan Football Association) Sol de América
—	MF	Salvador Breglia	15 September 1935 (aged 27)	2	0	(Paraguayan Football Association) Cerro Porteño
—	FW	César Cabrera	30 March 1938 (aged 24)	3	0	(Paraguayan Football Association) Club Nacional
—	MF	Lucio Calonga	13 December 1939 (aged 23)	1	0	(Paraguayan Football Association) River Plate
—	GK	Víctor González	4 May 1932 (aged 30)	0	0	(Brazilian Football Confederation) Fluminense
—	DF	Antonio Insfrán	17 January 1942 (aged 21)	4	0	(Paraguayan Football Association) Guaraní
—	FW	Eliseo Insfrán	27 October 1935 (aged 27)	5	1	(Paraguayan Football Association) Guaraní
—	MF	Claudio Lezcano		11	0	(Paraguayan Football Association) Olimpia
—	MF	Cecilio Martínez	1 February 1943 (aged 20)	5	2	(Paraguayan Football Association) Club Nacional
—	DF	Mariano Osorio		0	0	(Paraguayan Football Association) Olimpia
—	FW	Oppe Quiñónez	25 March 1933 (aged 29)	3	0	(Paraguayan Football Association) Guaraní
—	DF	Ricardo Tabarelli	7 February 1942 (aged 21)	0	0	(Paraguayan Football Association) Guaraní
—	MF	Arsenio Valdez	12 December 1942 (aged 20)	1	0	(Paraguayan Football Association) River Plate
—	FW	José Villamayor		1	0	(Paraguayan Football Association) River Plate
—	FW	Eladio Zárate	14 January 1942 (aged 21)	2	0	(Paraguayan Football Association) Olimpia

== Peru ==
Head Coach: (Peru) Juan Valdivieso

No.	Pos.	Player	Date of birth (age)	Caps	Goals	Club
—	GK	Rodolfo Bazán	14 December 1936 (aged 26)	0	0	(Peruvian Football Federation) Alianza Lima
—	DF	Carlos Bravo		0	0	(Peruvian Football Federation) Deportivo Municipal
—	DF	Eloy Campos	31 May 1942 (aged 20)	3	0	(Peruvian Football Federation) Sporting Cristal
—	MF	Juan de la Vega	10 March 1934 (aged 29)	6	0	(Peruvian Football Federation) Alianza Lima
—	DF	Adolfo Donayre	10 August 1933 (aged 29)	0	0	(Peruvian Football Federation) Alianza Lima
—	DF	Roberto Elías	7 June 1940 (aged 22)	0	0	(Peruvian Football Federation) Sporting Cristal
—	MF	Felix Escobar		0	0	(Peruvian Football Federation) Centro Iqueño
—	FW	Alberto Gallardo	28 November 1940 (aged 22)	3	0	(Peruvian Football Federation) Sporting Cristal
—	DF	Héctor Ladrón de Guevara	4 March 1940 (aged 23)	2	0	(Peruvian Football Federation) Sport Boys
—	FW	Pedro Pablo León	29 June 1943 (aged 19)	0	0	(Peruvian Football Federation) Alianza Lima
—	FW	Nemesio Mosquera	19 December 1936 (aged 26)	0	0	(Peruvian Football Federation) Deportivo Municipal
—	MF	Jesús Peláez	20 June 1940 (aged 22)	0	0	(Peruvian Football Federation) Centro Iqueño
—	MF	Victor Rostaing	15 October 1942 (aged 20)	0	0	(Peruvian Football Federation) Alianza Lima
—	GK	Luis Rubiños	31 December 1940 (aged 22)	0	0	(Peruvian Football Federation) Defensor Lima
—	MF	Anselmo Ruíz	16 August 1934 (aged 28)	0	0	(Peruvian Football Federation) Sporting Cristal
—	MF	Enrique Tenemás		0	0	(Peruvian Football Federation) Alianza Lima
—	FW	Jorge Vásquez	29 July 1937 (aged 25)	0	0	(Peruvian Football Federation) Sporting Cristal
—	MF	Mario Yasetic		0	0	(Peruvian Football Federation) Sporting Cristal
—	MF	Víctor Zegarra	18 March 1940 (aged 22)	0	0	(Peruvian Football Federation) Alianza Lima
