= Bolivia at the Copa América =

Soccer tournament

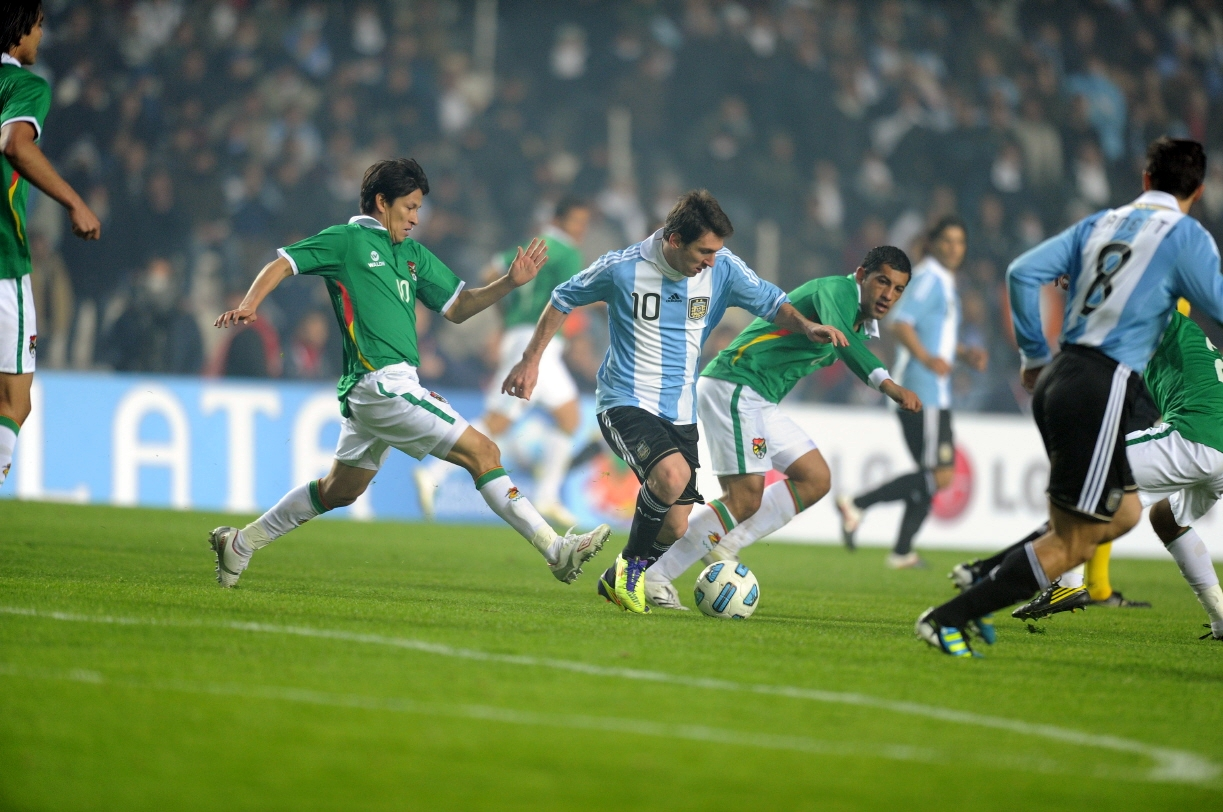
Scene from the opening match of the 2011 Copa América against Argentina which ended in a 1–1 draw.

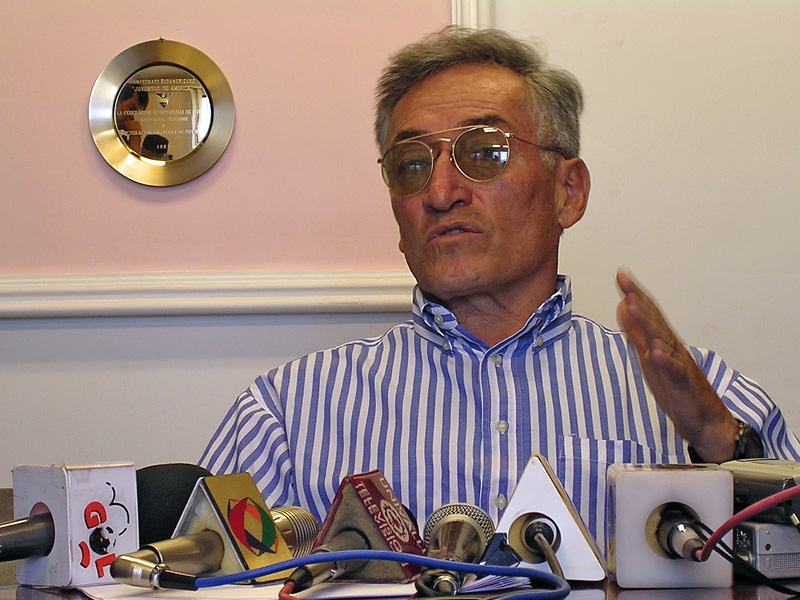
Ramiro Blacut (here in 2004) was the player of the tournament in 1963. Playing in Argentina at the time, he was one of only two Bolivian squad members who played outside of Bolivia.

The Copa América is South America's major tournament in senior men's football and determines the continental champion. Until 1967, the tournament was known as South American Championship. It is the oldest continental championship in the world with its first edition held in 1916.

Bolivia participated for the first time in 1926, but it took 23 years (26 matches) until their first victory.

1963 was a special year for Bolivia in tournament history. The country not only hosted the South American Championship for the first time. The two host cities, Cochabamba and La Paz, both lie in Andean valleys and are at a much higher altitude than large parts of the continent. Moderately, due to the altitude, Bolivia won the tournament unbeaten and earned their first and only international title. Forward Ramiro Blacut is the only Bolivian to be awarded an individual trophy when he was honoured as best player of the tournament that same year.

With a notable exception in 1997, when Bolivia reached the final in their second-ever home tournament, the team has been hugely unsuccessful in the past decades. From 1999 to 2021, they only won a single match (3–2 vs Ecuador in America Cup Chile 2015).

== Overall record ==
Bolivia missed out on the first nine South American championships (1916–1925) because the FBF was only founded in 1926.

South American Championship / Copa América record
Year	Round	Position	Pld	W	D	L	GF	GA	Squad
(Argentina) 1916	Not a CONMEBOL member								
(Uruguay) 1917	Not a CONMEBOL member								
(Brazil) 1919	Not a CONMEBOL member								
(Chile) 1920	Not a CONMEBOL member								
(Argentina) 1921	Not a CONMEBOL member								
(Brazil) 1922	Not a CONMEBOL member								
(Uruguay) 1923	Not a CONMEBOL member								
(Uruguay) 1924	Not a CONMEBOL member								
(Argentina) 1925	Not a CONMEBOL member								
(Chile) 1926	Fifth place	5th	4	0	0	4	2	24	Squad
(Peru) 1927	Fourth place	4th	3	0	0	3	3	19	Squad
(Argentina) 1929	Did not participate								
(Peru) 1935	Did not participate								
(Argentina) 1937	Did not participate								
(Peru) 1939	Did not participate								
(Chile) 1941	Did not participate								
(Uruguay) 1942	Did not participate								
(Chile) 1945	Sixth place	6th	6	0	2	4	3	16	Squad
(Argentina) 1946	Sixth place	6th	5	0	0	5	4	23	Squad
(Ecuador) 1947	Seventh place	7th	7	0	2	5	6	21	Squad
(Brazil) 1949	Fourth place	4th	7	4	0	3	13	24	Squad
(Peru) 1953	Sixth place	6th	6	1	1	4	6	15	Squad
(Chile) 1955	Did not participate								
(Uruguay) 1956	Did not participate								
(Peru) 1957	Did not participate								
(Argentina) 1959	Seventh place	7th	6	0	1	5	4	23	Squad
(Ecuador) 1959	Withdrew								
(Bolivia) 1963	Champions	1st	6	5	1	0	19	13	Squad
(Uruguay) 1967	Sixth place	6th	5	0	1	4	0	9	Squad
1975	Group stage	8th	4	1	0	3	3	9	Squad
1979	Group stage	6th	4	2	0	2	4	7	Squad
1983	Group stage	8th	4	0	2	2	4	6	Squad
(Argentina) 1987	Group stage	7th	2	0	1	1	0	2	Squad
(Brazil) 1989	Group stage	9th	4	0	2	2	0	8	Squad
(Chile) 1991	Group stage	9th	4	0	2	2	2	7	Squad
(Ecuador) 1993	Group stage	10th	3	0	2	1	1	2	Squad
(Uruguay) 1995	Quarter-finals	8th	4	1	1	2	5	6	Squad
(Bolivia) 1997	Runners-up	2nd	6	5	0	1	10	5	Squad
(Paraguay) 1999	Group stage	9th	3	0	2	1	1	2	Squad
(Colombia) 2001	Group stage	11th	3	0	0	3	0	7	Squad
(Peru) 2004	Group stage	9th	3	0	2	1	3	4	Squad
(Venezuela) 2007	Group stage	10th	3	0	2	1	4	5	Squad
(Argentina) 2011	Group stage	12th	3	0	1	2	1	5	Squad
(Chile) 2015	Quarter-finals	8th	4	1	1	2	4	10	Squad
(United States) 2016	Group stage	14th	3	0	0	3	2	7	Squad
(Brazil) 2019	Group stage	12th	3	0	0	3	2	9	Squad
(Brazil) 2021	Group stage	10th	4	0	0	4	2	10	Squad
(United States) 2024	Group stage	16th	3	0	0	3	1	10	Squad
Total	1 Title	29/48	122	20	26	76	109	308	—

== 1963 South American Championship ==
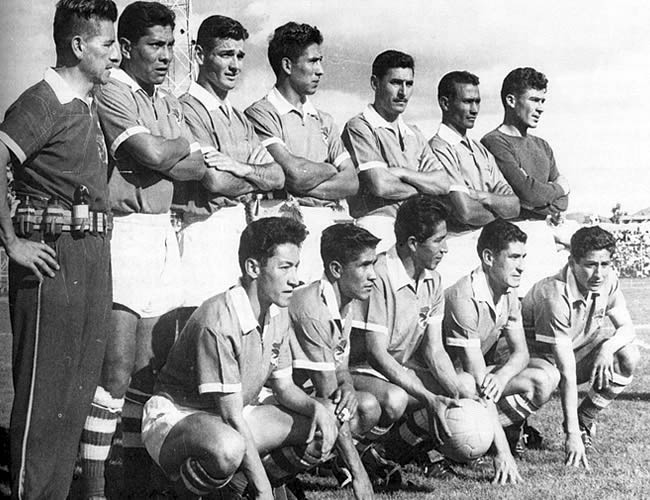
Bolivia's 1963 squad which won the title at their first home tournament.

Bolivia played their first match of the tournament against Ecuador. After they had given away an early 2–0 leading to a 2–4 deficit after 50 minutes, the match ended in a 4–4 draw. Subsequently, the Bolivian hosts won their matches against Colombia (2–1), Peru (3–2), Paraguay (2–0) and Argentina (3–2).

The table after five out of six match days looked as follows.

Position	Team	Pld	W	D	L	GF	GA	GD	Pts
1	Bolivia	5	4	1	0	14	9	+5	9
2	Paraguay	5	4	0	1	12	6	+6	8
3	Argentina	5	3	0	2	14	9	+5	6
4	Brazil	5	2	1	2	8	8	+0	5
5	Peru	6	2	1	3	8	11	−3	5
6	Ecuador	5	0	2	3	10	15	−5	2
7	Colombia	5	0	1	4	7	15	−8	1

Still to play: Ecuador - Colombia, Argentina - Paraguay, Bolivia - Brazil

Because a victory gave two points at the time, only Paraguay was able to put pressure on Bolivia on the last day of the tournament. In case of equal points, a play-off would have been held. In order to secure the title, Bolivia would have to earn at least as many points in their match against Brazil as Paraguay would in their match against Argentina.

The Paraguay match in La Paz ended 1–1, which meant Bolivia also needed at least a draw.

Match details

31 March 1963

Bolivia	5–4	Brazil
Ugarte 15', 58'; Camacho 25'; García 62'; Alcócer 86'	Report	Marco Antônio 26'; Almir 28'; Flávio 63', 66'

Estadio Félix Capriles, Cochabamba
Attendance: 25,000
Referee: Ovidio Orrego ( Colombia)

GK	Arturo López
DF	Roberto Cainzo
DF	Eduardo Espinoza
MF	Máximo Ramírez
MF	Wilfredo Camacho
MF	Eulogio Vargas
FW	Ramiro Blacut
FW	Máximo Alcócer
FW	Víctor Ugarte
FW	Ausberto García
FW	Fortunato Castillo
Manager:
(Brazil) Danilo Alvim

GK	Silas
DF	Cláudio Danni
DF	Jorge	Substituted off
MF	Procópio
MF	Geraldino
MF	Hilton Vaccari
FW	Tião
FW	Almir
FW	Flávio
FW	Marco Antônio
FW	Oswaldo
Substitutions:
DF	Massinha	Substituted on
Manager:
(Brazil) Aymoré Moreira

In spite of Brazil equalizing a two-goal lead twice, Bolivia secured the victory and the tournament title, two points ahead of Paraguay.

== Record by opponent ==
Bolivia's highest victory at a Copa América is a 4–0 win against Colombia in 1949. A 1–10 defeat against Brazil in the same tournament, along with a 0–9 defeat against Uruguay at the 1927 edition, are Bolivia's highest defeats of all time.

Copa América matches (by team)
Opponent	W	D	L	Pld	GF	GA
Argentina	2	2	12	16	10	50
Brazil	2	0	9	11	13	42
Chile	2	2	11*	15	17	49
Colombia	3	5	4	12	14	14
Costa Rica	0	0	2	2	0	6
Ecuador	2	5	1	8	12	13
Honduras	0	0	1	1	0	2
Japan	0	1	0	1	1	1
Mexico	1	2	0	3	3	1
Panama	0	0	2	2	2	5
Paraguay	1	2	8	11	8	31
Peru	3	4	9	16	17	28
United States	1	0	1	2	1	2
Uruguay	2	1	14	17	6	55
Venezuela	1	2	2	5	5	9
Total	20	26	76	122	109	308

* Includes a 2–2 draw awarded to Chile in 1953.

== Record players ==
Rank	Player	Matches	Tournaments
1	Víctor Ugarte	30	1947, 1949, 1953, 1959 and 1963
2	José Bustamante	24	1945, 1946, 1947, 1949 and 1953
3	Alberto Achá	23	1945, 1946, 1947 and 1949
3	Carlos Borja	23	1979, 1983, 1987, 1989, 1991, 1993 and 1995
5	José Milton Melgar	22	1993, 1987, 1989, 1991, 1993, 1995 and 1997
6	Marco Etcheverry	21	1989, 1991, 1993, 1995, 1997 and 1999
7	Vicente Arraya	20	1945, 1946, 1947 and 1949
8	Julio César Baldivieso	19	1991, 1993, 1995, 1997 and 2001
8	Juan Manuel Peña	19	1991, 1993, 1995, 1997, 1999 and 2007
10	Severo Orgaz	17	1945, 1946 and 1947
10	Marco Sandy	17	1993, 1995, 1997, 1999 and 2001

== Top goalscorers ==
Rank	Player	Goals	Tournaments (goals)
1	Víctor Ugarte	9	1949 (5), 1953 (2), 1963 (2)
2	Máximo Alcócer	7	1959 (2), 1963 (5)
3	Benigno Gutiérrez	5	1947 (2) and 1949 (3)
3	Erwin Sánchez	5	1991 (1), 1997 (3) and 1999 (1)
5	Ausberto García	4	1959 (1) and 1963 (3)
5	Wilfredo Camacho	4	1963
5	Marco Etcheverry	4	1993 (1), 1995 (1) and 1997 (2)
8	Zenón González	3	1945, 1946 and 1947
8	Ricardo Alcón	3	1953 (2) and 1959 (1)
8	Fortunato Castillo	3	1963
8	Ovidio Mezza	3	1975
8	Jaime Moreno	3	1997 (1) and 2007 (2)
8	Marcelo Moreno	3	2015 (2) and 2019 (1)

== Awards and records ==
Team Awards

- Champions 1x (1963)
- Second Place 1x (1997)

Individual Awards

- MVP 1963: Ramiro Blacut

Team Records

- Victory with highest number of goals conceded (5–4 vs Brazil, 31 March 1963. Tied with Brazil 6–4 Chile in 1937).
- Highest draw (4–4 vs Ecuador, 10 March 1963)

== See also ==
- Bolivia at the FIFA World Cup
