= Bolivia national football team results (1926–1979) =

This page details the match results and statistics of the Bolivia national football team from 1926 to 1979.

== Key ==
Key to matches

- Att.=Match attendance
- (H)=Home ground
- (A)=Away ground
- (N)=Neutral ground

Key to record by opponent

- Pld=Games played
- W=Games won
- D=Games drawn
- L=Games lost
- GF=Goals for
- GA=Goals against

== Results ==
Bolivia's score is shown first in each case.

No.	Date	Venue	Opponents	Score	Competition	Bolivia scorers	Att.	Ref.
1	12 October 1926	Estadio Sport de Ñuñoa, Santiago (N)	Chile	1–7	1926 South American Championship	Aguilar	12,000	
2	16 October 1926	Estadio Sport de Ñuñoa, Santiago (N)	Argentina	0–5	1926 South American Championship		8,000	
3	23 October 1926	Estadio Sport de Ñuñoa, Santiago (N)	Paraguay	1–6	1926 South American Championship	Soto	2,000	
4	28 October 1926	Estadio Sport de Ñuñoa, Santiago (N)	Uruguay	0–6	1926 South American Championship		8,000	
5	30 October 1927	Estadio Nacional, Lima (N)	Argentina	1–7	1927 South American Championship	Alborta	15,000	
6	6 November 1927	Estadio Nacional, Lima (N)	Uruguay	0–9	1927 South American Championship		6,000	
7	13 November 1927	Estadio Nacional, Lima (N)	Peru	2–3	1927 South American Championship	Bustamante (2)	14,000	
8	17 July 1930	Parque Central, Montevideo (N)	Kingdom of Yugoslavia	0–4	1930 FIFA World Cup		20,000	
9	20 July 1930	Estadio Centenario, Montevideo (N)	Brazil	0–4	1930 FIFA World Cup		12,000	
10	8 August 1938	Estadio Universitario, Bogotá (N)	Ecuador	1–1	1938 Bolivarian Games	Unknown	—	
11	11 August 1938	Estadio Universitario, Bogotá (N)	Venezuela	3–1	1938 Bolivarian Games	Molina (3)	—	
12	14 August 1938	Estadio Universitario, Bogotá (N)	Peru	0–3	1938 Bolivarian Games		—	
13	16 August 1938	Estadio Universitario, Bogotá (N)	Colombia	2–1	1938 Bolivarian Games	Alborta, Montoya	—	
14	22 August 1938	Estadio Universitario, Bogotá (N)	Ecuador	2–1	1938 Bolivarian Games	Plaza	—	
15	18 January 1945	Estadio Nacional, Santiago (N)	Argentina	0–4	1945 South American Championship		35,000	
16	24 January 1945	Estadio Nacional, Santiago (N)	Chile	0–5	1945 South American Championship		70,000	
17	28 January 1945	Estadio Nacional, Santiago (N)	Brazil	0–2	1945 South American Championship		28,000	
18	11 February 1945	Estadio Nacional, Santiago (N)	Ecuador	0–0	1945 South American Championship		70,000	
19	15 February 1945	Estadio Nacional, Santiago (N)	Uruguay	0–2	1945 South American Championship		65,000	
20	21 February 1945	Estadio Nacional, Santiago (N)	Colombia	3–3	1945 South American Championship	Fernández, González, Orgaz	22,000	
21	16 January 1946	Estadio Gasómetro, Buenos Aires (N)	Brazil	0–3	1946 South American Championship		50,000	
22	19 January 1946	Estadio Gasómetro, Buenos Aires (N)	Argentina	1–7	1946 South American Championship	Peredo	65,000	
23	26 January 1946	Estadio Monumental, Buenos Aires (N)	Paraguay	2–4	1946 South American Championship	Coronel (o.g.), González	80,000	
24	29 January 1946	Estadio de Independiente, Avellaneda (N)	Uruguay	0–5	1946 South American Championship		30,000	
25	8 February 1946	Estadio Gasómetro, Buenos Aires (N)	Chile	1–4	1946 South American Championship	Peredo	18,000	
26	30 November 1947	Estadio George Capwell, Guayaquil (N)	Ecuador	2–2	1947 South American Championship	Gutiérrez (2)	30,000	
27	4 December 1947	Estadio George Capwell, Guayaquil (N)	Argentina	0–7	1947 South American Championship		30,000	
28	9 December 1947	Estadio George Capwell, Guayaquil (N)	Uruguay	0–3	1947 South American Championship		15,000	
29	13 December 1947	Estadio George Capwell, Guayaquil (N)	Colombia	0–0	1947 South American Championship		18,000	
30	18 December 1947	Estadio George Capwell, Guayaquil (N)	Paraguay	1–3	1947 South American Championship	González	12,000	
31	27 December 1947	Estadio George Capwell, Guayaquil (N)	Peru	0–2	1947 South American Championship		5,000	
32	30 December 1947	Estadio George Capwell, Guayaquil (N)	Chile	3–4	1947 South American Championship	Tapia, Tardío, Orgaz	5,000	
33	5 January 1948	Lima (N)	Venezuela	2–2	1947–48 Bolivarian Games	González, Tapia	—	
34	6 April 1949	Pacaembu Stadium, São Paulo (N)	Chile	3–2	1949 South American Championship	Ugarte, Godoy, Gutiérrez	30,000	
35	10 April 1949	Pacaembu Stadium, São Paulo (N)	Brazil	1–10	1949 South American Championship	Ugarte	40,000	
36	17 April 1949	Estádio São Januário, Rio de Janeiro (N)	Uruguay	3–2	1949 South American Championship	Ugarte, Algañaraz, Gutiérrez	8,000	
37	25 April 1949	Pacaembu Stadium, São Paulo (N)	Ecuador	2–0	1949 South American Championship	Sánchez (o.g.), Ugarte	14,000	
38	27 April 1949	Vila Belmiro, Santos (N)	Peru	0–3	1949 South American Championship		12,000	
39	30 April 1949	Estádio São Januário, Rio de Janeiro (N)	Paraguay	0–7	1949 South American Championship		45,000	
40	6 May 1949	Estádio General Severiano, Rio de Janeiro (N)	Colombia	4–0	1949 South American Championship	Godoy, Gutiérrez, Rojas, Ugarte	12,000	
41	26 February 1950	Estadio Hernando Siles, La Paz (H)	Chile	2–0	1950 FIFA World Cup qualification	Ferrel, Mena	—	
42	12 March 1950	Santiago (A)	Chile	0–5	Friendly		—	
43	2 July 1950	Estádio Independência, Belo Horizonte (N)	Uruguay	0–8	1950 FIFA World Cup		5,000	
44	22 February 1953	Estadio Nacional, Lima (N)	Peru	1–0	1953 South American Championship	Ugarte	50,000	
45	25 February 1953	Estadio Nacional, Lima (N)	Uruguay	0–2	1953 South American Championship		45,000	
46	1 March 1953	Estadio Nacional, Lima (N)	Brazil	1–8	1953 South American Championship	Ugarte	45,000	
47	8 March 1953	Estadio Nacional, Lima (N)	Ecuador	1–1	1953 South American Championship	Alcón	45,000	
48	16 March 1953	Estadio Nacional, Lima (N)	Paraguay	1–2	1953 South American Championship	Santos	15,000	
49	28 March 1953	Estadio Nacional, Lima (N)	Chile	2–2	1953 South American Championship	Santos, Alcón	45,000	
50	6 June 1957	Asunción (A)	Paraguay	2–5	Copa Paz del Chaco	Garcia, Ugarte	15,000	
51	13 June 1957	Asunción (A)	Paraguay	1–0	Copa Paz del Chaco	Ugarte	—	
52	18 August 1957	La Paz (H)	Paraguay	3–3	Copa Paz del Chaco	Garcia, Ugarte, Alcocer	—	
53	21 August 1957	La Paz (H)	Paraguay	2–1	Copa Paz del Chaco	Ugarte, Brown	—	
54	22 September 1957	Santiago (A)	Chile	1–2	1958 FIFA World Cup qualification	Alcón	—	
55	29 September 1957	Estadio Hernando Siles, La Paz (H)	Chile	3–0	1958 FIFA World Cup qualification	García, Alcócer (2)	—	
56	6 October 1957	Estadio Hernando Siles, La Paz (H)	Argentina	2–0	1958 FIFA World Cup qualification	Alcócer, J. Ramírez	—	
57	27 October 1957	Estadio de Independiente, Avellaneda (H)	Argentina	0–4	1958 FIFA World Cup qualification		—	
58	8 March 1959	Estadio Monumental, Buenos Aires (N)	Uruguay	0–7	First 1959 South American Championship		35,000	
59	11 March 1959	Estadio Monumental, Buenos Aires (N)	Argentina	0–2	First 1959 South American Championship		45,000	
60	12 March 1959	Estadio Monumental, Buenos Aires (N)	Paraguay	0–5	First 1959 South American Championship		40,000	
61	21 March 1959	Estadio Monumental, Buenos Aires (N)	Brazil	2–4	First 1959 South American Championship	Alcón, García	25,000	
62	26 March 1959	Estadio Monumental, Buenos Aires (N)	Chile	2–5	First 1959 South American Championship	Alcócer (2)	70,000	
63	29 March 1959	Estadio Monumental, Buenos Aires (N)	Peru	0–0	First 1959 South American Championship		40,000	
64	15 July 1961	Estadio Hernando Siles, La Paz (H)	Uruguay	1–1	1962 FIFA World Cup qualification	Alcócer	—	
65	30 July 1961	Estadio Centenario, Montevideo (A)	Uruguay	1–2	1962 FIFA World Cup qualification	Camacho	—	
66	10 August 1962	Estadio Hernando Siles, La Paz (H)	Paraguay	3–1	Copa Paz del Chaco	Ugarte, Alcócer (2)	—	
67	12 August 1962	Estadio Félix Capriles, Cochabamba (H)	Paraguay	3–2	Copa Paz del Chaco	García, Ugarte, Alcócer	—	
68	17 February 1963	Asunción (A)	Paraguay	0–3	Copa Paz del Chaco		—	
69	19 February 1963	Asunción (A)	Paraguay	1–5	Copa Paz del Chaco	Ugarte	—	
70	10 March 1963	Estadio Hernando Siles, La Paz (N)	Ecuador	4–4	1963 South American Championship	López, Castillo, Alcócer, Camacho	15,000	
71	17 March 1963	Estadio Félix Capriles, Cochabamba (N)	Colombia	2–1	1963 South American Championship	Alcócer (2)	18,000	
72	21 March 1963	Estadio Hernando Siles, La Paz (N)	Peru	3–2	1963 South American Championship	Camacho, Alcócer, García	20,000	
73	24 March 1963	Estadio Félix Capriles, Cochabamba (N)	Paraguay	2–0	1963 South American Championship	Castillo, García	18,000	
74	28 March 1963	Estadio Hernando Siles, La Paz (N)	Argentina	3–2	1963 South American Championship	Castillo, Blacut, Camacho	20,000	
75	31 March 1963	Estadio Félix Capriles, Cochabamba (N)	Brazil	5–4	1963 South American Championship	Ugarte (2), Camacho, García, Alcócer	25,000	
76	25 July 1965	Estadio Defensores del Chaco, Asunción (A)	Paraguay	0–2	1966 FIFA World Cup qualification		18,396	
77	17 August 1965	Estadio Monumental, Buenos Aires (H)	Argentina	1–4	1966 FIFA World Cup qualification	Vargas	56,173	
78	22 August 1965	Estadio Hernando Siles, La Paz (H)	Paraguay	2–1	1966 FIFA World Cup qualification	M. Ramirez, Castillo	7,000	
79	29 August 1965	Estadio Hernando Siles, La Paz (H)	Argentina	1–2	1966 FIFA World Cup qualification	Delgado (o.g.)	9,690	
80	17 January 1967	Estadio Centenario, Montevideo (N)	Uruguay	0–4	1967 South American Championship		15,000	
81	22 January 1967	Estadio Centenario, Montevideo (N)	Argentina	0–1	1967 South American Championship		6,000	
82	25 January 1967	Estadio Centenario, Montevideo (N)	Paraguay	0–1	1967 South American Championship		5,000	
83	28 January 1967	Estadio Centenario, Montevideo (N)	Venezuela	0–3	1967 South American Championship		11,000	
84	1 February 1967	Estadio Centenario, Montevideo (N)	Chile	0–0	1967 South American Championship		1,500	
85	27 July 1969	Estadio Hernando Siles, La Paz (H)	Argentina	3–1	1970 FIFA World Cup qualification	Diaz, Blacut, Alvarez	21,267	
86	10 August 1969	Estadio Hernando Siles, La Paz (H)	Peru	2–1	1970 FIFA World Cup qualification	Alvarez, Chumpitaz	20,670	
87	17 August 1969	Estadio Nacional, Lima (A)	Peru	0–3	1970 FIFA World Cup qualification		43,148	
88	24 August 1969	Boca Juniors Stadium, Buenos Aires (A)	Argentina	0–1	1970 FIFA World Cup qualification		47,069	
89	15 August 1971	La Paz (H)	Chile	3–4	Friendly	Diaz, Valverde, Linares	—	
90	11 June 1972	Estádio Couto Pereira, Curitiba (N)	Peru	0–3	Brazil Independence Cup		—	
91	18 June 1972	Morenão, Campo Grande (N)	Yugoslavia	1–1	Brazil Independence Cup	Pariente	15,000	
92	21 June 1972	Vivaldão, Manaus (N)	Venezuela	2–2	Brazil Independence Cup	Rimazza, Blacut	—	
93	25 June 1972	Vivaldão, Manaus (N)	Paraguay	1–6	Brazil Independence Cup	Molinas (o.g.)	—	
94	24 March 1973	Lima (A)	Peru	0–2	Copa Mariscal Sucre		—	
95	31 March 1973	La Paz (H)	Paraguay	1–1	Friendly	Messa	—	
96	29 April 1973	Estadio Hernando Siles, La Paz (H)	Ecuador	3–3	Friendly	Valverde, Linares, Jiménez	—	
97	6 May 1973	Quito (A)	Ecuador	0–0	Friendly		—	
98	27 May 1973	Maracanã Stadium, Rio de Janeiro (A)	Brazil	0–5	Friendly		—	
99	15 July 1973	La Paz (H)	Peru	2–0	Copa Mariscal Sucre	Messa (2)	—	
100	24 July 1973	Santiago (A)	Chile	0–3	Copa Provoste		30,000	
101	2 September 1973	Estadio Hernando Siles, La Paz (H)	Paraguay	1–2	1974 FIFA World Cup qualification	Morales	19,384	
102	9 September 1973	Boca Juniors Stadium, Buenos Aires (A)	Argentina	0–4	1974 FIFA World Cup qualification		39,243	
103	23 September 1973	Estadio Hernando Siles, La Paz (H)	Argentina	0–1	1974 FIFA World Cup qualification		19,266	
104	30 September 1973	Estadio Defensores del Chaco, Asunción (A)	Paraguay	0–4	1974 FIFA World Cup qualification		24,268	
105	27 June 1975	Cochabamba (H)	Argentina	1–2	Copa Cornelio Saavedra	Messa	—	
106	7 July 1975	Cochabamba (H)	Paraguay	1–2	Friendly	Diaz	—	
107	9 July 1975	Cochabamba (H)	Ecuador	1–0	Friendly	Jiménez	—	
108	20 July 1975	Estadio Jesús Bermúdez, Oruro (H)	Chile	2–1	1975 Copa América	Messa (2)	18,000	
109	27 July 1975	Estadio Jesús Bermúdez, Oruro (H)	Peru	0–1	1975 Copa América		18,000	
110	7 August 1975	Estadio Nacional, Lima (A)	Peru	1–3	1975 Copa América	Messa	40,000	
111	13 August 1975	Estadio Nacional, Santiago (A)	Chile	0–4	1975 Copa América		15,000	
112	6 February 1977	Estadio Hernando Siles, La Paz (H)	Paraguay	0–1	Copa Paz del Chaco		—	
113	9 February 1977	Estadio Hernando Siles, La Paz (H)	Paraguay	2–2	Copa Paz del Chaco	Campos, Jiménez	—	
114	27 February 1977	Estadio Libertador Simón Bolívar, La Paz (H)	Uruguay	1–0	1978 FIFA World Cup qualification	Jiménez	20,306	
115	6 March 1977	Brígido Iriarte Stadium, Caracas (A)	Venezuela	3–1	1978 FIFA World Cup qualification	Messa, Jiménez, Aguilar	5,034	
116	13 March 1977	Estadio Libertador Simón Bolívar, La Paz (H)	Venezuela	2–0	1978 FIFA World Cup qualification	Jiménez, Aragonés	21,217	
117	27 March 1977	Estadio Centenario, Montevideo (A)	Uruguay	2–2	1978 FIFA World Cup qualification	Aguilar (2)	7,477	
118	12 June 1977	Estadio Libertador Simón Bolívar, La Paz (H)	Poland	1–2	Friendly	Jiménez	20,000	
119	14 July 1977	Estadio Olímpico Pascual Guerrero, Cali (N)	Brazil	0–8	1978 FIFA World Cup qualification		38,037	
120	17 July 1977	Estadio Olímpico Pascual Guerrero, Cali (N)	Peru	0–5	1978 FIFA World Cup qualification		32,511	
121	29 October 1977	Népstadion, Budapest (A)	Hungary	0–6	1978 FIFA World Cup qualification play-off		60,000	
122	30 November 1977	Estadio Libertador Simón Bolívar, La Paz (H)	Hungary	2–3	1978 FIFA World Cup qualification play-off	Aragonés (2)	26,983	
123	10 July 1979	Estadio Hernando Siles, La Paz (H)	Paraguay	3–1	Copa Paz del Chaco	Aguilar, Aragonés, Espinoza	—	
124	12 July 1979	Cochabamba (H)	Paraguay	1–1	Friendly	Unknown	—	
125	18 July 1979	Estadio Hernando Siles, La Paz (H)	Argentina	2–1	1979 Copa América	Reynaldo (2)	40,000	
126	26 July 1979	Estadio Hernando Siles, La Paz (H)	Brazil	2–1	1979 Copa América	Aragonés (2)	40,000	
127	1 August 1979	Asunción (A)	Paraguay	0–2 (4–3p)	Copa Paz del Chaco		—	
128	8 August 1979	José Amalfitani Stadium, Buenos Aires (A)	Argentina	0–3	1979 Copa América		30,000	
129	16 August 1979	Estádio do Morumbi, São Paulo (A)	Brazil	0–2	1979 Copa América		50,000	

Notes

1. A: Originally played as a qualification match for the 1950 FIFA World Cup before Argentina withdrew. As a result of Argentina's withdrawal, both Bolivia and Chile qualified automatically and FIFA do not consider this match as an official qualification match.
2. B: Originally scheduled as a qualification match for the 1950 World Cup but later played as a friendly after both teams qualified automatically.
3. C: Suspended after 66 minutes, the match was awarded to Chile following unsportsmanlike behaviour from the Bolivian team.

== Record by opponent ==
Team	Pld	W	D	L	GF	GA	GD	WPCT
Argentina	19	4	0	15	15	58	−43	21.05
Brazil	11	2	0	9	11	51	−40	18.18
Chile	16	4	1	11	23	48	−25	25.00
Colombia	5	3	2	0	11	5	+6	60.00
Ecuador	10	3	7	0	16	12	+4	30.00
Hungary	2	0	0	2	2	9	−7	0.00
Paraguay	28	7	4	17	34	73	−39	25.00
Peru	15	4	1	10	11	31	−20	26.67
Poland	1	0	0	1	1	2	−1	0.00
Uruguay	14	2	2	10	8	53	−45	14.29
Venezuela	6	3	2	1	12	9	+3	50.00
Yugoslavia (Note: Includes results as Kingdom of Yugoslavia.)	2	0	1	1	1	5	−4	0.00
Total	129	32	20	77	145	356	−211	24.81

Source: Results
