= List of Bolivia international footballers born outside Bolivia =

This is a list of football players who have represented the Bolivia national football team in international football since 1926 and were born outside Bolivia.

== List of Players ==
The following players:

1. have played at least one game for the full (senior male) Bolivia national team since 1926; and
2. were born outside Bolivia.

This list includes players who have dual citizenship with Bolivia and/or have become naturalised Bolivian citizens. The players are ordered per modern-day country of birth.

List of players
Country of birth	Player	Caps	Goals	Period
Argentina	Luis Aguilera	?	?	1959
Argentina	Raúl Álvarez	?	?	1969
Argentina	Héctor Awad	?	?	1977
Argentina	Luis Fernando Bastida	2	0	1977
Argentina	Roberto Cainzo	6	0	1961–1963
Argentina	Roberto Capparelli	1	0	1950
Argentina	Sergio Castillo	35	0	1996–2001
Argentina	Luis Cristaldo	94	5	1989–2005
Argentina	Mario di Meglio	?	?	1963
Argentina	Juan Américo Díaz	10	3	1969–1975
Argentina	Julio Díaz	?	?	1969
Argentina	Eduardo Espinoza	3	0	1963
Argentina	Juan Alfredo Farías	2+	0+	1969–1975
Argentina	Leonardo Fernández	17	0	2003–2005
Argentina	Raúl Fernández	11	1	1945–1946
Argentina	Ricardo Fontana	13	0	1989
Argentina	Antonio Greco	1	0	1950
Argentina	Luis Liendo Moreno	3	0	1975
Argentina	Damián Lizio	11	1	2014–2015
Argentina	**Máximo Mamani**	2	0	2026–
Argentina	Vicente Moreno	?	?	1958
Argentina	Fernando Ochoaizpur	15	3	1996–1999
Argentina	Maximiliano Ortiz	2	0	2018
Argentina	Ismael Peinado Lino	3	0	1977
Argentina	Gustavo Quinteros	26	1	1993–1999
Argentina	Darío Rojas	18	0	1993–1994
Argentina	Mario Rojas	7	0	1969–1975
Argentina	Juan Carlos Sánchez	5	1	1985
Argentina	Ramón Santos	?	?	1953–1959
Argentina	René Taritolay	2	0	1977
Argentina	Carlos Trucco	51	0	1989–1997
Argentina	**Luciano Ursino**	7	1	2023
Argentina	Miguel Ángel Vacaflor	?	?	1989
Argentina	Eulogio Vargas	5	0	1963
Argentina	Gerardo Yecerotte	4	1	2009–2012
Brazil	Álex da Rosa	6	1	2004–2010
Brazil	Edivaldo Hermoza "Bolívia"	11	1	2011–2013
Brazil	Fernando Martelli	5	0	2015–2016
Cameroon	**Marc Enoumba**	12	1	2021–2022
Chile	Luis Liendo Asbún	6	0	1999
Chile	Víctor Villalón	2	0	1977
Colombia	Jair Reinoso	4	0	2023–2024
Paraguay	Nelson Cabrera	5	0	2016
Paraguay	Pablo Escobar	23	6	2008–2018
Paraguay	Arturo Galarza	2	0	1977
Paraguay	Luis Galarza	17	0	1977–1989
Paraguay	**Juan Godoy**	4	1	2026–
Paraguay	Eligio Martínez	14	0	1989
Portugal	**Erwin Sánchez**	7	0	2019–2021
Spain	**Jaume Cuéllar**	9	0	2021–2024
Spain	**Óscar López**	6	0	2024–
Spain	**Lucas Macazaga**	7	0	2025–
Spain	**Carlos Sejas**	2	0	2023–
Sweden	Martin Smedberg-Dalence	13	1	2014–2016
United States	Antonio Bustamante	2	0	2020
United States	**Adrián Jusino**	36	0	2019–2024
United States	Alejandro Meleán	17	0	2012–2017
United States	**Efrain Morales**	13	0	2024–
Uruguay	**Gerónimo Govea**	2	0	2026–

=== Players with no caps ===
- (Ghana) David Akologo (2024)

== See also ==
- List of Bolivia international footballers
