= 1978 FIFA World Cup qualification (CONMEBOL) =

Tournament details
- Dates: 20 February 1977 – 14 July 1977
- Teams: 9 (from 1 confederation)

Tournament statistics
- Matches played: 21
- Goals scored: 55 (2.62 per match)
- Top scorer(s): (Brazil) Zico (5 goals)

Listed below are the dates and results for the 1978 FIFA World Cup qualification rounds for the South American Zone (CONMEBOL). For an overview of the qualification rounds, see the article 1978 FIFA World Cup qualification.

A total of 10 CONMEBOL teams entered the competition. The South American zone was allocated 3.5 places (out of 16) in the final tournament. Argentina, the hosts, qualified automatically, leaving 2.5 spots open for competition between 9 teams.

== Format ==
There would be two rounds of play:

- First Round: The 9 teams were divided into 3 groups of 3 teams each. The teams would play against each other on a home-and-away basis. The group winners would advance to the Final Round.
- Final Round: The 3 teams would play against each other once in a neutral venue. The group winner and runner-up would qualify. The third-placed team would advance to the UEFA / CONMEBOL Intercontinental Play-off.

== First round ==
=== Group 1 ===
Rank	Team	Pts	Pld	W	D	L	GF	GA	GD
1	Brazil	6	4	2	2	0	8	1	+7
2	Paraguay	4	4	1	2	1	3	3	0
3	Colombia	2	4	0	2	2	1	8	−7

20 February 1977

Colombia	0 – 0	Brazil
	Report

El Campín, Bogotá
Attendance: 55,439
Referee: Comesaña (Argentina)

24 February 1977

Colombia	0 – 1	Paraguay
		Jara 26'

El Campín, Bogotá
Attendance: 45,838
Referee: Orozco Guerrero (Peru)

6 March 1977

Paraguay	1 – 1	Colombia
Jara 90'		Vilarete 58'

Defensores del Chaco, Asunción
Attendance: 30,154
Referee: Cerullo Giuliano (Uruguay)

9 March 1977

Brazil	6 – 0	Colombia
Roberto 15', 31'; Zico 25'; Marinho 41', 55'; Rivellino 85'	Report

Maracanã, Rio de Janeiro
Attendance: 162,774
Referee: Coerezza (Argentina)

13 March 1977

Paraguay	0 – 1	Brazil
	Report	Insfrán 59' (o.g.)

Defensores del Chaco, Asunción
Attendance: 40,490
Referee: Pestarino (Argentina)

20 March 1977

Brazil	1 – 1	Paraguay
Roberto 6' (pen.)	Report	Báez 54'

Maracanã, Rio de Janeiro
Attendance: 94,947
Referee: Barreto Ruiz (Uruguay)

Brazil advanced to the Final Round.

=== Group 2 ===
Rank	Team	Pts	Pld	W	D	L	GF	GA	GD
1	Bolivia	7	4	3	1	0	8	3	+5
2	Uruguay	4	4	1	2	1	5	4	+1
3	Venezuela	1	4	0	1	3	2	8	−6

9 February 1977

Venezuela	1 – 1	Uruguay
Flores 88'		Oliveira 5'

Brígido Iriarte Stadium, Caracas
Attendance: 5,000
Referee: Ramirez (Colombia)

27 February 1977

Bolivia	1 – 0	Uruguay
Jiménez 48'

Estadio Libertador Simón Bolívar, La Paz
Attendance: 20,306
Referee: Arppi Filho (Brazil)

6 March 1977

Venezuela	1 – 3	Bolivia
Iriarte 86'		Mezza 5'; Jiménez 76'; Aguilar 80'

Brígido Iriarte Stadium, Caracas
Attendance: 5,034
Referee: Silvagno Cavanna (Chile)

13 March 1977

Bolivia	2 – 0	Venezuela
Jiménez 17'; Aragonés 53'

Estadio Libertador Simón Bolívar, La Paz
Attendance: 21,217
Referee: Pérez Nuñez (Peru)

17 March 1977

Uruguay	2 – 0	Venezuela
Pizzani 11', 83'

Centenario, Montevideo
Attendance: 4,383
Referee: Marques (Brazil)

27 March 1977

Uruguay	2 – 2	Bolivia
Pereyra 23', 49'		Aguilar 25', 59'

Centenario, Montevideo
Attendance: 7,477
Referee: Ithurralde (Argentina)

Bolivia advanced to the Final Round.

=== Group 3 ===
Rank	Team	Pts	Pld	W	D	L	GF	GA	GD
1	Peru	6	4	2	2	0	8	2	+6
2	Chile	5	4	2	1	1	5	3	+2
3	Ecuador	1	4	0	1	3	1	9	−8

20 February 1977

Ecuador	1 – 1	Peru
Paz y Miño 81'		Oblitas 43'

Olímpico Atahualpa, Quito
Attendance: 39,576
Referee: Rohrig (Brazil)

27 February 1977

Ecuador	0 – 1	Chile
		Gamboa 33'

Modelo, Guayaquil
Attendance: 51,200
Referee: Romero (Argentina)

6 March 1977

Chile	1 – 1	Peru
Ahumada 42'		Muñante 70'

Nacional, Santiago
Attendance: 67,983
Referee: Faville Neto (Brazil)

12 March 1977

Peru	4 – 0	Ecuador
José Velásquez 19'; Oblitas 48', 50'; Luces 63'

Nacional, Lima
Attendance: 43,319
Referee: Barrancos Alvarez (Bolivia)

20 March 1977

Chile	3 – 0	Ecuador
Figueroa 29', 55'; Castro 40'

Nacional, Santiago
Attendance: 15,571
Referee: Llobregat Vicedo (Venezuela)

26 March 1977

Peru	2 – 0	Chile
Sotil 49'; Oblitas 54'

Nacional, Lima
Attendance: 62,000
Referee: Coelho (Brazil)

Peru advanced to the Final Round.

== Final round ==
Rank	Team	Pts	Pld	W	D	L	GF	GA	GD
1	Brazil	4	2	2	0	0	9	0	+9
2	Peru	2	2	1	0	1	5	1	+4
3	Bolivia	0	2	0	0	2	0	13	−13

10 July 1977

Brazil	1 – 0	Peru
Gil 53'	Relatorio

Pascual Guerrero, Cali, Colombia
Attendance: 50,345
Referee: Comesana (Argentina)

14 July 1977

Brazil	8 – 0	Bolivia
Zico 5', 10', 27' (pen.), 60'; Roberto 22'; Gil 54'; Cerezo 70'; Marcelo 89'	Relatorio

Pascual Guerrero, Cali, Colombia
Attendance: 38,037
Referee: Cavanna (Chile)

17 July 1977

Peru	5 – 0	Bolivia
Cubillas 31', 44'; José Velásquez 65', 89'; Rojas 74'	Relatorio

Pascual Guerrero, Cali, Colombia
Attendance: 32,511
Referee: Barreto Ruiz (Uruguay)

Brazil and Peru qualified. Bolivia advanced to the UEFA / CONMEBOL Intercontinental Play-off.

== Inter-confederation play-offs ==
Team 1	Agg.	Team 2	1st leg	2nd leg
Hungary	9–2	Bolivia	6–0	3–2

== Qualified teams ==
The following three teams from CONMEBOL qualified for the final tournament.

Team	Qualified as	Qualified on	Previous appearances in FIFA World Cup^{1}
Argentina	Hosts	6 July 1966	6 (1930, 1934, 1958, 1962, 1966, 1974)
Brazil	Final Round winners	14 July 1977	10 (1930, 1934, 1938, 1950, 1954, **1958**, **1962**, 1966, **1970**, 1974)
Peru	Final Round winners	17 July 1977	2 (1930, 1970)

^{1} Bold indicates champions for that year. Italic indicates hosts for that year.

== Goalscorers ==
5 goals

- (Brazil) Zico

4 goals

- (Brazil) Roberto Dinamite
- (Peru) Juan Carlos Oblitas

3 goals

- (Bolivia) Miguel Aguilar
- (Bolivia) Carlos Aragonés
- (Bolivia) Porfirio Jiménez
- (Peru) José Velásquez

2 goals

- (Brazil) Gilberto Alves
- (Brazil) Marinho Chagas
- (Chile) Elías Figueroa
- (Paraguay) Carlos Jara Saguier
- (Peru) Teófilo Cubillas
- (Uruguay) Dario Pereyra
- (Uruguay) Nitder Pizzani

1 goal

- (Bolivia) Oviedo Mezza
- (Brazil) Toninho Cerezo
- (Brazil) Marcelo Oliveira
- (Brazil) Rivellino
- (Chile) Sergio Ahumada
- (Chile) Osvaldo Castro
- (Chile) Miguel Ángel Gamboa
- (Colombia) Eduardo Vilarete
- (Ecuador) José Fabián Paz y Miño
- (Paraguay) Carlos José Báez
- (Peru) Alejandro Luces
- (Peru) Juan José Muñante
- (Peru) Percy Rojas
- (Peru) Hugo Sotil
- (Uruguay) Washington Oliveira
- (Venezuela) Vicente Flores
- (Venezuela) Rafael Iriarte

1 own goal

- (Bolivia) Windsor del Llano (playing against Hungary)
- (Paraguay) José Domingo Insfrán (playing against Brazil)

== See also ==
- 1978 FIFA World Cup qualification
- 1978 FIFA World Cup qualification (UEFA)
- 1978 FIFA World Cup qualification (CONCACAF)
- 1978 FIFA World Cup qualification (CAF)
- 1978 FIFA World Cup qualification (AFC and OFC)
