= Insfrán =

Insfrán is a Spanish surname. Notable people with the surname include:

- Antonio Insfrán (born 1942), Paraguayan footballer
- Benjamin Insfran (born 1972), Brazilian beach volleyball player
- Eligio Insfrán (born 1935), Paraguayan footballer
- Eliseo Insfrán (1935–2020), Paraguayan footballer
- Fernanda Insfrán (born 1998), Paraguayan handball player
- Gildo Insfrán (born 1951), Argentine politician
- Javier Insfrán (born 1999), Paraguayan rower
- José Insfrán (born 1949), Paraguayan footballer
- Nelson Insfrán (born 1995), Argentine footballer

== See also ==
- Carlos Antonio López Ynsfrán (1792–1862), leader of Paraguay from 1841 to 1862
- Edgar Ynsfrán (1921–1991), Minister of the Interior of Paraguay from 1956 to 1966
- Facundo Ynsfrán (1860–1902), Vice President of Paraguay from 1894 to 1898
