= Luis Liendo =

Luis Liendo may refer to:

- Luis Liendo (footballer, born 1978)
- Luis Liendo (footballer, born 1949)
- Luis Liendo (wrestler)
