= Liendo (disambiguation) =

Liendo may refer to:

== Places ==
- Liendo, a municipality in the autonomous community of Cantabria, Spain
- Liendo Plantation, a historic cotton plantation in Waller County, Texas, United States

== People ==
- Eduardo Liendo (1941–2025), Venezuelan writer and scholar
- Gastón Liendo (born 1974), Argentine football player and coach
- Horacio Tomás Liendo (1924–2007), Argentinian military officer and politician
- Javier Liendo (born 1988), Argentine footballer
- José Liendo (1945–1973), Chilean political activist and militant
- Joshua Liendo (born 2002), Canadian swimmer
- Luis Liendo (footballer, born 1949), Bolivian footballer
- Luis Liendo (footballer, born 1978), Chilean-Bolivian footballer
- Luis Liendo (wrestler) (born 1980), Venezuelan amateur Greco-Roman wrestler

== See also ==
- Diego Vidal de Liendo (1622–1648), Spanish painter of the Baroque
- Ximena Vélez Liendo (born 1976), Bolivian conservation biologist
