= Vicente Flores =

Vicente Flores can refer to:

- Vicente Flores (footballer)
- Vicente Flores (politician)
