= Mesiano (surname) =

Mesiano is an Italian surname. Notable people with the surname include:

- Alessia Mesiano (born 1991), Italian boxer
- José Mesiano (born 1942), Argentine footballer
