= Porfirio Jiménez =

Porfirio Jiménez can refer to:

- Porfirio Jiménez (Bolivian footballer)
- Porfirio Jiménez (Mexican footballer)
