= Senén =

Senén is a Spanish male given name. Notable people referred to by this name include the following:

- Senén Mosquera (1938–2018), Colombian footballer
- Senén Casas Regueiro (1934–1996), Cuban politician
- Senén Villaverde (1896–1950), Spanish footballer
- Senen Reyes (born 1965), Cuban-American rapper

== See also ==
- Senen, Senen, an administrative village in the Senen district of Indonesia
