= Jesús Herbas =

Bolivian footballer (1949-2020)

Personal information
- Date of birth: 2 January 1940
- Place of birth: Cochabamba, Bolivia
- Date of death: 23 July 2020 (aged 80)
- Position: Midfielder

Senior career*
Years	Team	Apps	(Gls)
- Club Tunari
1961-1964	Jorge Wilstermann		
1964-1966	Universitario La Paz		
1966	Jorge Wilstermann		
1966-1968	Universitario La Paz		
1968	Bolivar		
1969-1971	The Strongest		
1971	Melgar		
1972	Independiente Unificada		
1973	Ingenieros de Oruro		
1974-1975	Bolivar		
1976	Transito de Cochabamba		

International career
1963–1967	Bolivia	11	(0)
Medal record
Representing Bolivia
Copa América
Winner	1963 Bolivia
- * Club domestic league appearances and goals

Jesús Herbas (2 January 1940 - 23 July 2020) was a Bolivian footballer. He was part of Bolivia's squad that won the 1963 South American Championship on home soil along with his brother Jaime Herbas.

== International career ==
He was selected in Bolivia's squad for the 1963 South American Championship. He played three games during the competition, the game against Peru national football team on 21 March 2024 being his first cap, as Bolivia won the competition on home soil.

Herbas played one game during the 1966 World Cup qualifiers against Argentina on 17 August 1965.

He was again in Bolivia's squad, playing three games.

He played four games during the 1970 World Cup qualifiers, the game against Argentina on 24 August 1969 being his 11th and last cap for Bolivia.
