= Arturo Torres (Bolivian footballer) =

Bolivian footballer (1939–2025)

Alberto Arturo Torres
Personal information
- Date of birth: 21 December 1939
- Date of death: 17 June 2025 (aged 85)
- Place of death: Tarija, Bolivia
- Position: Defender

Senior career*
Years	Team	Apps	(Gls)
1962–1963	Deportivo Municipal		
1965	The Strongest		
1966–1969	Deportivo Municipal		

International career
1961–1969	Bolivia	8	(0)
Medal record
Representing Bolivia
Copa América
Winner	1963 Bolivia
- * Club domestic league appearances and goals

Alberto Arturo Torres or Alberto Torrez in somes sources (21 December 1939 – 17 June 2025) was a Bolivian footballer. He was part of Bolivia's squad that won the 1963 South American Championship on home soil.

Torres died on 17 June 2025, at the age of 85.

== International career ==
Torres got his first cap with Bolivia on 15 July 1961 against Uruguay for the 1st leg of the 1962 FIFA World Cup qualification. He also play the 2nd leg on 30 July, also against Uruguay.

He was selected in Bolivia's squad for the 1963 South American Championship, playing only one game against Ecuador on 10 March as Bolivia won the tournament, its first and only Copa America.

In July and August 1965, he played four 1966 FIFA World Cup qualification games, against Paraguay and Argentina.

His eighth and last cap for Bolivia was on 17 August 1969 against Peru for the 1970 FIFA World Cup qualification.
