= Isaac Álvarez =

Bolivian footballer (1933)

Personal information
- Full name: Isaac Álvarez Moscoso
- Date of birth: 16 July 1933 (age 93)
- Place of birth: Cochabamba, Bolivia
- Position: Goalkeeper

Senior career*
Years	Team	Apps	(Gls)
- Always Ready
1963–1967	31 de Octubre		
- Club Bolívar

International career
1963–1965	Bolivia	2	(0)
Medal record
Representing Bolivia
Copa América
Winner	1963 Bolivia
- * Club domestic league appearances and goals

Isaac Álvarez Moscoso (born 16 July 1933) is a Bolivian former footballer who played as a goalkeeper. He was part of Bolivia's squad that won the 1963 South American Championship on home soil.

== Career ==
Born in Cochabamba, Álvarez played for the club 31 de Octubre in La Paz. He was nicknamed "La Araña negra" ('the black spider').

Álvarez was selected in Bolivia's squad for the 1963 South American Championship which took place on home soil, but was an unused substitute as Bolivia won the competition, its first and only title. He got his two only caps with Bolivia in 1965, playing qualifying games for the 1966 FIFA World Cup against Paraguay on 22 August (2–1 win for Bolivia) and Argentina on 29 August (2–1 defeat for Bolivia).

== Later life ==
After his playing career, Álvarez was a physical education instructor. On the 40th anniversary of the Bolivian victory in the South American Championship, he was awarded a medal and granted a lifetime pension by the Bolivian government.
