= Jaime Herbas =

Bolivian footballer (born 1941)

Personal information
- Date of birth: 25 September 1941
- Date of death: unknown
- Position: Midfielder

Senior career*
Years	Team	Apps	(Gls)
1960	Bata de Quillacollo		
1963	Jorge Wilstermann		
1964	Aurora		
1965-1966	Jorge Wilstermann		
1967	Universitario La Paz		
1968	The Strongest		
1970-1972	Aurora		

International career
1963–1967	Bolivia	5	(0)
Medal record
Representing Bolivia
Copa América
Winner	1963 Bolivia
- * Club domestic league appearances and goals

Jaime Herbas (25 September 1941 – date of death unknown) was a Bolivian footballer. He played in five matches for the Bolivia national football team from 1963 to 1967. He was part of Bolivia's squad that won the 1963 South American Championship on home soil alongside his brother Jesus Herbas. He is decesased.

== International career ==
He was in Bolivia's squad for the 1963 South American Championship.

He only played one game in the tournament, against Argentina on 28 March alongside his brother Jesus. This game was his first cap with Bolivia.

He was again in Bolivia's squad for the 1967 South American Championship, his brother being also in the team, and played 4 games during the tournament, including 2 alongside his brother.

The game against Chile on 1 February was his fifth and last cap with Bolivia.
