= Carlos Cárdenas Rojas =

Bolivian footballer (1935–2020)

Carlos Cárdenas
Personal information
- Date of birth: 4 November 1934
- Date of death: 17 August 2020 (aged 85)
- Position: Midfielder

Senior career*
Years	Team	Apps	(Gls)
- The Strongest

International career
- Bolivia
Medal record
Representing Bolivia
Copa América
Winner	1963 Bolivia
- * Club domestic league appearances and goals

Carlos Cárdenas Rojas (4 November 1934 – 17 August 2020) was a Bolivian footballer who played as a midfielder for The Strongest. He was part of Bolivia's squad that won the 1963 South American Championship on home soil.

== International career ==
Cárdenas Rojas was selected in Bolivia's squad for the 1963 South American Championship which took place on home soil, but was an unused substitute as Bolivia won its first and only Copa América.

== Death ==
Cárdenas Rojas died on 17 August 2020, at the age of 85.
