= Jesús Peláez =

Peruvian footballer (1940–2020)

Personal information
- Full name: Jesús César Peláez Miranda
- Date of birth: 20 June 1940
- Date of death: 18 January 2020 (aged 79)

Senior career*
Years	Team	Apps	(Gls)
1961-1962	Centro Iqueño		
1963-1965	Sporting Cristal		
1966-1972	CD Veracruz		
1972-1973	Porvenir Miraflores		

International career
1963-1965	Peru	5	(1)
- * Club domestic league appearances and goals

Jesús César Peláez Miranda (20 June 1940 – 18 January 2020) was a Peruvian footballer. He was part of Peru's squad for the 1963 South American Championship. Peláez died on 18 January 2020, at the age of 83.

== International career ==
Peláez was selected in Peru’s squad for the 1963 South American Championship, playing four games in the tournament. The game against Ecuador on 17 March was his first cap with Peru.

His fifth and last cap was a 1966 FIFA World Cup qualification game against Uruguay on 13 June 1965. During that game he scored his only goal with Peru.
