= Oscar Villarroel =

Bolivian footballer (1944–2023)

Osvaldo Oscar Villarroel
Personal information
- Date of birth: 27 February 1944
- Place of birth: Cochabamba, Bolivia
- Date of death: 1 November 2023 (aged 79)
- Place of death: Santa Cruz, Bolivia
- Position: Right-back

Senior career*
Years	Team	Apps	(Gls)
1961–1971	Jorge Wilstermann		

International career
1963	Bolivia		
Medal record
Representing Bolivia
Copa América
Winner	1963 Bolivia
- * Club domestic league appearances and goals

Osvaldo Oscar Villarroel (27 February 1944 – 1 November 2023) was a Bolivian footballer who played as a right-back for Jorge Wilstermann. He was the youngest member of Bolivia's squad that won the 1963 South American Championship on home soil though he was an unused substitute. Villarroel died on 1 November 2023 in Santa Cruz.
