= Arsenio Valdez =

Paraguayan footballer (1942–2014)

Personal information
- Date of birth: 12 December 1942
- Date of death: 27 March 2014 (aged 71)

International career
Years	Team	Apps	(Gls)
1963–1970	Paraguay	14	(0)

Arsenio Valdez (12 December 1942 – 27 March 2014) was a Paraguayan footballer. He played in 14 matches for the Paraguay national football team from 1963 to 1970. He was also part of Paraguay's squad for the 1963 South American Championship.
