= Alfonso Quijano =

Ecuadorian footballer (1942–2021)

Personal information
- Date of birth: 11 August 1942
- Date of death: 4 April 2021 (aged 78)

International career
Years	Team	Apps	(Gls)
1963–1967	Ecuador	6	(0)

Alfonso Quijano (11 August 1942 – 4 April 2021) was an Ecuadorian footballer. He played in six matches for the Ecuador national football team from 1963 to 1967. He was also part of Ecuador's squad for the 1963 South American Championship.
