= Nicolás Linares (Bolivian footballer) =

Bolivian footballer (born 1945)

Personal information
- Date of birth: 6 December 1945 (age 80)
- Position: Midfielder

International career
Years	Team	Apps	(Gls)
1973–1975	Bolivia	3	(0)

Nicolás Linares (born 6 December 1945) is a Bolivian footballer. He played in three matches for the Bolivia national football team from 1973 to 1975. He was also part of Bolivia's squad for the 1975 Copa América tournament.
