= Amaury Silva =

Brazilian footballer (1942–2020)

Personal information
- Date of birth: 6 March 1942
- Place of birth: Marília, São Paulo, Brazil
- Date of death: May 2020 (aged 78)
- Place of death: Santos, São Paulo, Brazil
- Position: Forward

Senior career*
Years	Team	Apps	(Gls)
1960-1961	São Bento		
1961-1964	Guarani		
1964-1965	Flamengo	61	(15)
1965-1966	FC Porto		
- Santos
- XV de Piracicaba
- Comercial Ribeirão Preto
	Bangu	51	(15)
1971-1972	Atlas		

International career
1963	Brazil	2	(0)
- * Club domestic league appearances and goals

Amaury Silva, sometimes Amauri Silva or Amauri da Silva (6 March 1942 – May 2020) was a Brazilian footballer. He played in two matches for the Brazil national football team during the 1963 South American Championship. Silva died in May 2020, at the age of 78.
