= José Jhonson =

Ecuadorian footballer (1939-2015)

Personal information
- Full name: José Marcelino Jhonson Coronado
- Date of birth: 3 September 1939
- Place of birth: Guayaquil, Ecuador
- Date of death: 22 December 2015 (aged 76)

International career
Years	Team	Apps	(Gls)
1963	Ecuador	5	(0)

José Jhonson (3 September 1939 – 22 December 2015) was an Ecuadorian footballer. He played in five matches for the Ecuador national football team in 1963. He was also part of Ecuador's squad for the 1963 South American Championship.
