= Fabián Paz =

Ecuadorian footballer (born 1953)

Personal information
- Full name: José Fabián Paz y Miño López
- Date of birth: 16 March 1953 (age 73)
- Place of birth: Quito, Ecuador
- Position: Forward

International career
Years	Team	Apps	(Gls)
1975	Ecuador	2	(0)

José Fabián Paz y Miño López (born 16 March 1953) is an Ecuadorian former footballer who played as a forward. He made two appearances for the Ecuador national team in 1975. He was also part of Ecuador's squad for the 1975 Copa América tournament.
