= Miguel Bustamante =

Ecuadorian footballer (1939-2012)

Personal information
- Full name: Miguel Antonio Bustamante Tagle
- Date of birth: 17 February 1939
- Place of birth: Guayaquil, Ecuador
- Date of death: 13 November 2012 (aged 73)

International career
Years	Team	Apps	(Gls)
1963–1967	Ecuador	6	(0)

Miguel Bustamante (17 February 1939 – 13 November 2012) was an Ecuadorian footballer. He played in six matches for the Ecuador national football team from 1963 to 1967. He was also part of Ecuador's squad for the 1963 South American Championship.
