= Anselmo Ruíz =

Peruvian footballer (1934–2022)

Personal information
- Full name: Anselmo Jacinto Ruíz Huamanchumo
- Date of birth: 1934
- Place of birth: Chimbote, Peru
- Date of death: 12 June 2022 (aged 87–88)
- Place of death: Lima, Peru
- Positions: Centre back; defensive midfielder

Senior career*
| Years | Team | Apps | (Gls) |
| 1956–1963 | Sporting Cristal | | |
| 1964–1965 | Defensor Arica | | |
| 1966–1968 | Sporting Cristal | | |
| 1969 | Porvenir Miraflores | | |
| 1970–1971 | CNI | | |

International career
| 1963–1966 | Peru | 8 | (0) |
- * Club domestic league appearances and goals

Anselmo Jacinto Ruíz Huamanchumo (1934–2022) was a Peruvian professional footballer who played as central back or defensive midfielder.

== Playing career ==
=== Club career ===
A key figure at Sporting Cristal de Lima, Anselmo Ruíz played for the club in two stints: first from 1956 to 1963, and then again from 1966 to 1968. With Sporting Cristal, he won the Peruvian championships in 1961 and 1968, in addition to playing three matches in the 1962 Copa Libertadores.

Besides Sporting Cristal, he also played for Defensor Arica, where he won the Peruvian Second Division championship in 1964, and then for Porvenir Miraflores in 1969 before finishing his career with CNI de Iquitos in 1971.

=== International career ===
Anselmo Ruíz played for the Peruvian national team between 1963 and 1966 (eight matches in total), notably competing in the 1963 South American Championship in Bolivia.

== Honours ==
Sporting Cristal

- Peruvian Primera División (2): 1961, 1968

Defensor Arica

- Peruvian Segunda División: 1964
