= Jorge Vásquez (Peruvian footballer) =

Peruvian footballer (1937–2025)

Personal information
- Full name: Jorge Vásquez Centenaro
- Date of birth: 29 July 1937
- Place of birth: Salaverry, Peru
- Date of death: January 2025 (aged 87)

Senior career*
Years	Team	Apps	(Gls)
1959-1962	Centro Iqueño		
1963-1969	Sporting Cristal		
1970-1973	Porvenir Miraflores		

International career
1963	Peru	1	(0)
- * Club domestic league appearances and goals

Jorge Vásquez (29 July 1937 – January 2025) was a Peruvian footballer. He played in one match for the Peru national football team on 27 March 1963 against Paraguay during the 1963 South American Championship.

Vásquez died in January 2025, at the age of 87.
