= Píter (footballer) =

Brazilian footballer (1940–2022)

Personal information
- Full name: Eurípedes Fernandes
- Date of birth: 24 April 1940
- Place of birth: Igarapava, Brazil
- Date of death: 4 February 2022 (aged 81)
- Place of death: Ribeirão Preto, Brazil
- Position: Centre-back

Senior career*
Years	Team	Apps	(Gls)
1955–1960	América-SP		
1961–1973	Comercial-SP		
1973–1976	Atlético Goianiense		
- * Club domestic league appearances and goals as of 13 February 2024

Eurípedes Fernandes (24 April 1940 – 4 February 2022), better known as Píter, was a Brazilian professional footballer who played as a centre-back.

== Career ==
Píter began his career at América de Rio Preto, where he played until 1960. He arrived at Comercial de Ribeirão Preto the following year, and there, he became one of the greatest in the club's history, earning the nickname "Rocha Negra" (Black Rock). He was named by Pelé as the best defender he had faced, in addition to defending the Brazil national team in the 1963 South American Championship, but did not make an appearance.

== Honours ==
América-SP

- Campeonato Paulista Série A2: 1957

== Death ==
Píter died at the age of 81 on 4 February 2022, in Ribeirão Preto.
