= Porfirio Jiménez (Bolivian footballer) =

Bolivian footballer (born 1952)

Personal information
- Full name: Porfirio Jiménez Gómez
- Date of birth: 16 February 1952 (age 74)
- Place of birth: Yacuiba, Bolivia
- Positions: Attacking midfielder; striker

International career
Years	Team	Apps	(Gls)
1971–1977	Bolivia	19	(7)

Porfirio Jiménez Gómez (born 16 February 1952) is a Bolivian retired professional footballer who played primarily as a striker.

== Career ==
Jiménez began his career at age of 14 with the Club Irala. At senior level, he played for eight clubs: Real Santa Cruz, Club Deportivo Guabirá, Oriente Petrolero, Club Bolívar, Ferro Carril Oeste, Chaco Petrolero, Club Aurora and Club Deportivo Libertad. He played in nineteen matches for the Bolivia national football team from 1971 to 1977. He was also part of Bolivia's squad for the 1975 Copa América tournament.

=== International goals ===
Scores and results list Bolivia's goal tally first.

#	Date	Venue	Opponent	Score	Result	Competition
1.	29 April 1973	Estadio Hernando Siles, La Paz, Bolivia	Ecuador	–	3–3	1973 Bolivarian Games
2.	10 July 1975	Estadio Félix Capriles, Cochabamba, Bolivia	Ecuador	1–0	1–0	Friendly
3.	9 February 1977	Estadio Hernando Siles, La Paz, Bolivia	Paraguay	–	2–2	Friendly
4.	27 February 1977	Estadio Libertador Simón Bolívar, La Paz, Bolivia	Uruguay	1–0	1–0	1978 FIFA World Cup qualification
5.	6 March 1977	Brígido Iriarte Stadium, Caracas, Venezuela	Venezuela	2–0	3–1	1978 FIFA World Cup qualification
6.	13 March 1977	Estadio Libertador Simón Bolívar, La Paz, Bolivia	Venezuela	1–0	2–0	1978 FIFA World Cup qualification
7.	16 June 1977	Estadio Libertador Simón Bolívar, La Paz, Bolivia	Poland	1–1	1–2	Friendly

== Honours ==
Guabirá

- Primera División: 1975

Club Bolívar

- Liga de Fútbol Profesional: 1978
- Copa Bolivia: 1979
