= Amauri (footballer, born 1942) =

Brazilian footballer (born 1942)

Personal information
- Full name: Amauri Alvès Horta
- Date of birth: 21 August 1942 (age 84)
- Place of birth: Sabará, Brazil

International career
Years	Team	Apps	(Gls)
1963–1968	Brazil	3	(1)

Amauri Alvès Horta (born 21 August 1942), known as just Amauri, is a Brazilian footballer. He played in two matches for the Brazil national football team from 1963 to 1968. He was also part of Brazil's squad for the 1963 South American Championship.
