= Ricardo Tabarelli =

Paraguayan footballer (born 1942)

Personal information
- Date of birth: 7 February 1942 (age 84)

International career
Years	Team	Apps	(Gls)
1963–1970	Paraguay	5	(0)

Ricardo Tabarelli (born 7 February 1942) is a Paraguayan footballer. He played in five matches for the Paraguay national football team from 1963 to 1970. He was also part of Paraguay's squad for the 1963 South American Championship.
