= Vicente Bobadilla =

Paraguayan footballer (1938-2012)

Personal information
- Full name: Vicente Bobadilla
- Date of birth: 5 April 1938
- Place of birth: Capiatá, Paraguay
- Date of death: 28 June 2012 (aged 74)
- Place of death: Paraguay
- Position: Defender

Senior career*
Years	Team	Apps	(Gls)
1953–1959	General Díaz		
1959–1964	Sol de América		
1964–1971	Guaraní		
1972	Olimpia		

International career
1960–1971	Paraguay	45	(0)
- * Club domestic league appearances and goals

Vicente Bobadilla (5 April 1938 – 28 June 2012) was a Paraguay international football defender who won two Paraguayan Primera División championships with Club Guaraní in the 1960s.

== Club ==
Born in Capiatá, Bobadilla started his club career with local side General Díaz in 1953. He would play in central defense for Club Sol de América until he joined Guaraní in 1964.

== International ==
Bobadilla made his international debut for the Paraguay national football team in the 1960 Taça do Atlântico. He was capped 45 times for Paraguay in a national career which lasted from 1960 to 1971. He played for Paraguay at the 1963 and 1967 South American Championship.
