= Hugo Palenque =

Bolivian footballer (born 1937)

Personal information
- Date of birth: 1 December 1937 (age 88)
- Position: Defender

Senior career*
Years	Team	Apps	(Gls)
- Mariscal Braun
- 31 de Octubre

International career
1963–1967	Bolivia	3	(0)
Medal record
Representing Bolivia
Copa América
Winner	1963 Bolivia
- * Club domestic league appearances and goals

Hugo Palenque (born 1 December 1937) is a Bolivian footballer who played as a defender. He made three appearances for the Bolivia national team from 1963 to 1967. He was part of Bolivia's squad that won the 1963 South American Championship, and also played the 1967 South American Championship.
