= Altamiro Pereira =

Brazilian footballer (born 1940)

Personal information
- Date of birth: 15 April 1940 (age 86)

International career
Years	Team	Apps	(Gls)
1963	Brazil	1	(0)

Altamiro Pereira (born 15 April 1940) is a Brazilian footballer. He played in one match for the Brazil national football team in 1963. He was also part of Brazil's squad for the 1963 South American Championship.
