= Ari Ercílio =

Brazilian footballer (1941-1972)

Personal information
- Full name: Ari Ercílio Barbosa
- Date of birth: 18 August 1941
- Place of birth: Porto Alegre, Brazil
- Date of death: 18 November 1972 (aged 31)
- Place of death: Rio de Janeiro, Brazil
- Position: Defender

Youth career
- 1955–1959: Internacional

Senior career*
Years	Team	Apps	(Gls)
1959–1963	Internacional		
1963–1965	Corinthians	27	(0)
1966	Novo Hamburgo		
1966–1971	Grêmio	198	(1)
1972	Fluminense	21	(0)

International career
1966	Brazil	2	(0)
- * Club domestic league appearances and goals

Ari Ercílio Barbosa (18 August 1941 – 18 November 1972) was a Brazilian footballer.

== Career ==
Revealed in the youth sectors of SC Internacional, Ari Ercílio also played for Corinthians and Floriano (currently Novo Hamburgo), before returning to Porto Alegre and defending Grêmio FBPA, a team with which he created greater identification in his career, making 198 appearances between 1966 and 1971. In 1972, he played for Fluminense FC.

Ari Ercílio also played for the Brazil national team in two matches, against Chile, valid for the 1966 Copa Bernardo O'Higgins.

== Honours ==
Internacional

- Campeonato Gaúcho: 1961

Grêmio

- Campeonato Gaúcho: 1967, 1968

Brazil

- Copa Bernardo O'Higgins: 1966

== Death ==
Ari Ercílio died on 18 November 1972, a day off while he was at Fluminense FC, drowning after falling while fishing near Gruta da Imprensa, in the city of Rio de Janeiro.
