= Baldomero Amarilla =

Paraguayan footballer (1935-2014)

Personal information
- Date of birth: 24 August 1935
- Place of birth: Encarnación, Paraguay
- Date of death: 4 February 2014 (aged 78)

International career
Years	Team	Apps	(Gls)
1962–1963	Paraguay	6	(0)

Baldomero Amarilla (24 August 1935 – 4 February 2014) was a Paraguayan footballer. He played in six matches for the Paraguay national football team from 1962 to 1963. He was also part of Paraguay's squad for the 1963 South American Championship.
