= Roque Ditro =

Argentine footballer

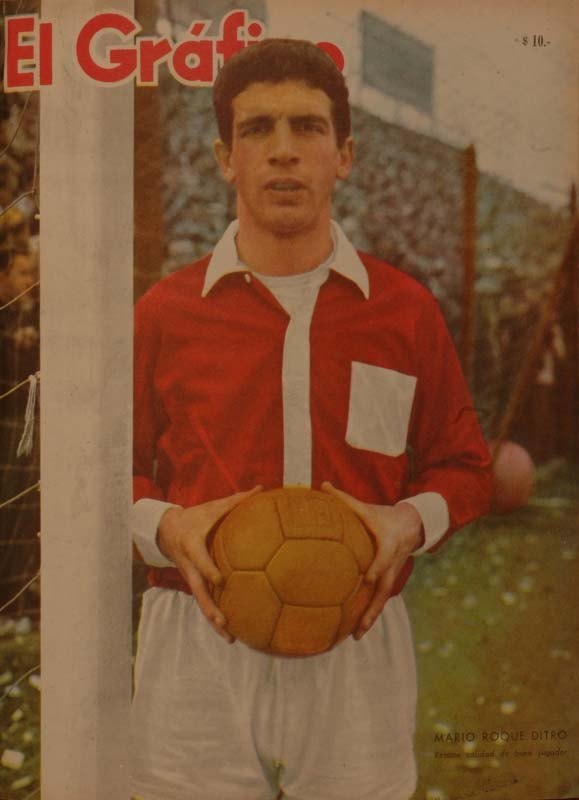

Personal information
- Full name: Roque Mario Ditro
- Date of birth: 17 August 1936
- Date of death: 9 April 2001 (aged 64)
- Position: Defender

International career
| Years | Team | Apps | (Gls) |
| 1963 | Argentina | 3 | (0) |

Roque Ditro (17 August 1936 – 9 April 2001) was an Argentine footballer. He played in three matches for the Argentina national football team in 1963. He was also part of Argentina's squad for the 1963 South American Championship.
