= Joaquín Sánchez (Colombian footballer) =

Colombian footballer (1941–2020)

Personal information
- Date of birth: 5 February 1941
- Date of death: 2 March 2020 (aged 79)

International career
Years	Team	Apps	(Gls)
1963–1969	Colombia	5	(0)

Joaquín Sánchez (5 February 1941 – 2 March 2020) was a Colombian footballer. He played in five matches for the Colombia national football team from 1963 to 1969. He was also part of Colombia's squad for the 1963 South American Championship.
