= Orlando Marín =

Colombian footballer (1942-2014)

Personal information
- Date of birth: 23 September 1942
- Date of death: 17 May 2014 (aged 71)

International career
Years	Team	Apps	(Gls)
1963	Colombia	4	(0)

Orlando Marín (23 September 1942 – 17 May 2014) was a Colombian footballer. He played in four matches for the Colombia national football team in 1963. He was also part of Colombia's squad for the 1963 South American Championship.
