= Enrique Fernández (footballer, born 1944) =

Argentine footballer

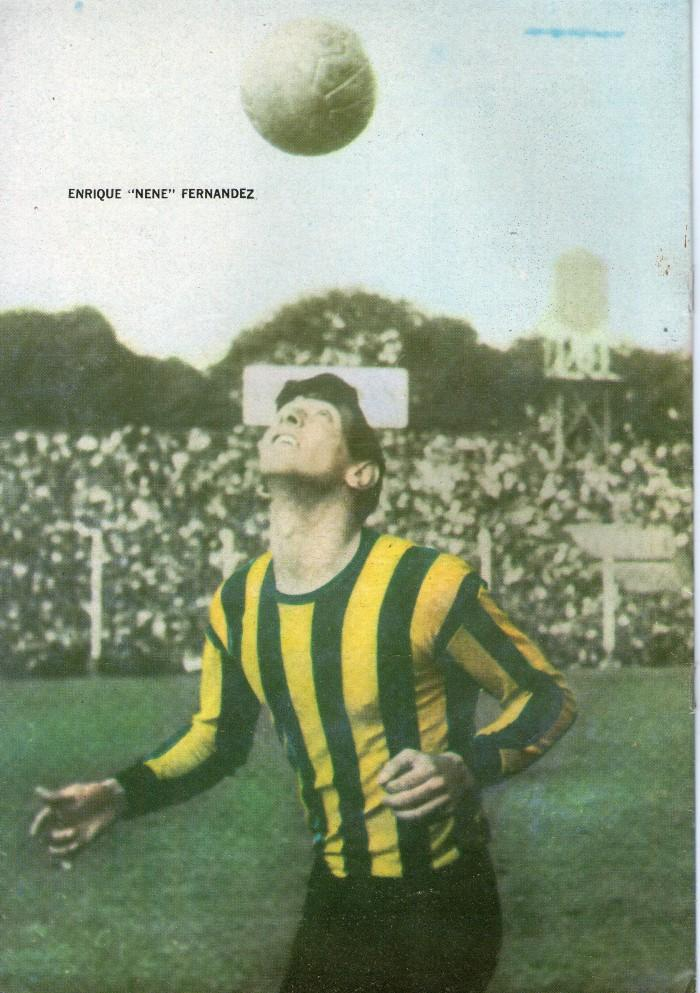

Personal information
- Full name: Enrique Santiago Fernández
- Date of birth: 21 March 1944
- Place of birth: Rosario, Santa Fe, Argentina
- Date of death: 12 November 2003 (aged 59)
- Position: Midfielder

International career
Years	Team	Apps	(Gls)
1963	Argentina	8	(1)

Enrique Santiago Fernández (21 March 1944 – 12 November 2003) was an Argentine footballer. He played in eight matches for the Argentina national football team in 1963. He was also part of Argentina's squad for the 1963 South American Championship.
