= Edgar Quinteros =

Bolivian footballer (1940–2023)

Personal information
- Full name: Edgar Quinteros Guarda
- Date of birth: 19 July 1940
- Date of death: 11 December 2023 (aged 83)
- Place of death: La Paz, Bolivia
- Position: Forward

Senior career*
Years	Team	Apps	(Gls)
- Club Aurora
- Club San José
- 31 de Octubre
- Club Bolívar

International career
1963–1967	Bolivia	5	(0)
- * Club domestic league appearances and goals

Edgar Quinteros Guarda (19 July 1940 – 11 December 2023) was a Bolivian footballer. A forward, he played in five matches for the Bolivia national team from 1963 to 1967. He was also part of Bolivia's squad that won the 1963 South American Championship. Quinteros died in La Paz on 11 December 2023, at the age of 83.
