= Mário Tito =

Brazilian footballer

Personal information
- Date of birth: 6 November 1941
- Place of birth: Bom Jardim, Brazil
- Date of death: 9 March 1997 (aged 55)

International career
Years	Team	Apps	(Gls)
1963	Brazil	1	(0)

Mário Tito (6 November 1941 – 9 March 1997) was a Brazilian footballer. He played in one match for the Brazil national football team in 1963. He was also part of Brazil's squad for the 1963 South American Championship.
