= Marcial (footballer, born 1941) =

Brazilian footballer (1941–2018)

Marcial de Mello Castro
Personal information
- Date of birth: 3 June 1941
- Place of birth: Tupaciguara, Brazil
- Date of death: 2 August 2018 (aged 77)

International career
Years	Team	Apps	(Gls)
1963	Brazil	6	(0)

Marcial de Mello Castro (3 June 1941 – 2 August 2018) was a Brazilian footballer. He played in six matches for the Brazil national football team in 1963. He was also part of Brazil's squad for the 1963 South American Championship.
