= Rodolfo Bazán =

Peruvian footballer (born 1938)

Personal information
- Date of birth: 14 December 1938 (age 87)
- Place of birth: Lima, Peru

International career
Years	Team	Apps	(Gls)
1963	Peru	5	(0)

Rodolfo Bazán (born 14 December 1938) is a Peruvian footballer. He played in five matches for the Peru national football team in 1963. He was also part of Peru's squad for the 1963 South American Championship.
