= Norberto Bautista =

Argentine footballer

Norberto Claudio Bautista

Personal information
- Date of birth: 30 December 1940
- Date of death: 13 May 1987 (aged 46)
- Position: Defender

International career
Years	Team	Apps	(Gls)
1963	Argentina	1	(0)

Norberto Claudio Bautista (30 December 1940 – 13 May 1987) was an Argentine footballer. He played in one match for the Argentina national football team in 1963. He was also part of Argentina's squad for the 1963 South American Championship.
