= William (footballer, born 1933) =

Brazilian footballer (1933–2024)

William José Assis Silva
Personal information
- Date of birth: 25 June 1933
- Place of birth: Mariana, Minas Gerais, Brazil
- Date of death: 9 June 2024 (aged 90)
- Place of death: Belo Horizonte, Minas Gerais, Brazil
- Position: Defender

Senior career*
Years	Team	Apps	(Gls)
1954–1963	Atlético Mineiro		
1964	America		
1964–1967	Cruzeiro		
1968	Villa Nova		

International career
1963	Brazil	6	(0)
- * Club domestic league appearances and goals

William José Assis Silva (25 June 1933 – 9 June 2024) was a Brazilian footballer who played as a defender. He made six appearances for the Brazil national team in 1963. He was also part of Brazil's squad for the 1963 South American Championship. William died from complications of a fall in Belo Horizonte, on 9 June 2024, at the age of 90.
