= Benigno Gutiérrez =

Bolivian footballer (born 1925)

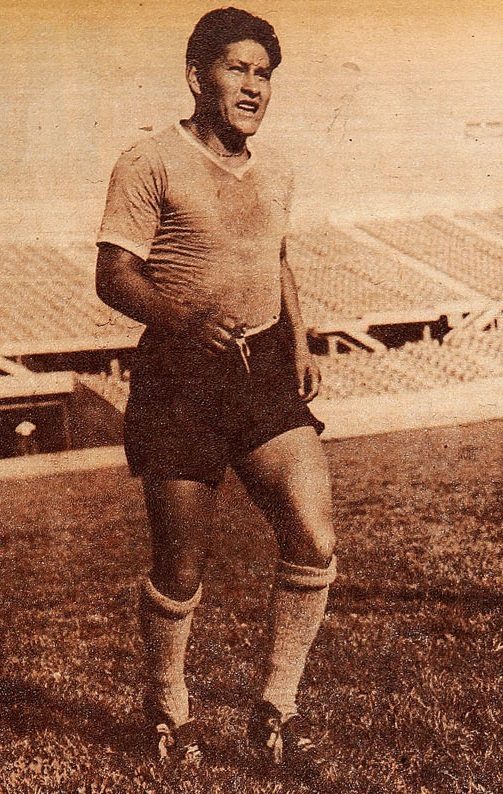

Personal information
- Full name: Benigno Gutiérrez Salazar
- Date of birth: 1 September 1925
- Place of birth: La Paz, Bolivia
- Position: Forward

Senior career*
| Years | Team | Apps | (Gls) |
| 1947–1953 | Club Litoral | | |

International career
- Bolivia
- * Club domestic league appearances and goals

Benigno Gutiérrez Salazar (born 1 September 1925, date of death unknown) was a Bolivian football forward who played for Bolivia in the 1950 FIFA World Cup. Gutiérrez is deceased.

== Career ==
Gutiérrez played at the 1949 South American Championship and also played for Club Litoral.
