= Roberto Cainzo =

Bolivian footballer (1931–2016)

Personal information
- Date of birth: 13 April 1931
- Date of death: 20 September 2016 (aged 85)
- Place of death: La Paz, Bolivia
- Position: Defender

International career
Years	Team	Apps	(Gls)
1963	Bolivia	5	(0)
Medal record
Representing Bolivia
Copa América
Winner	1963 Bolivia

Roberto Cainzo (13 April 1931 – 20 September 2016) was a Bolivian footballer.

He was part of Bolivia's squad that won the 1963 South American Championship on home soil. Cainzo died on 20 September 2016, at the age of 85.

== International career ==
Cainzo was selected in Bolivia's squad for the 1963 South American Championship which took place on home soil. Cainzo got his first cap during the competition, on 10 March 2023 against Ecuador. The victorious game against Brazil, which enabled Bolivia to win the competition, was his fifth and last cap.
