= Eliseo Insfrán =

Paraguayan footballer (1935–2020)

Personal information
- Full name: Eliseo Insfrán Orué
- Date of birth: 27 October 1935
- Place of birth: Asunción, Paraguay
- Date of death: 16 February 2020 (aged 84)

International career
Years	Team	Apps	(Gls)
1956-1965	Paraguay	21	(1)

Eliseo Insfrán Orué (27 October 1935 – 17 August 2020) was a Paraguayan footballer who played for clubs in Paraguay, Colombia and Chile and for the Paraguay national football team in the FIFA World Cup in Sweden in 1958. Insfrán died on 16 February 2020, at the age of 84.

== Teams ==
- Guaraní 1954–1966
- Deportes Quindío 1966
- Libertad 1967
- O'Higgins 1968
- Sportivo Luqueño 1969–1970
