= Massinha =

Brazilian footballer

Personal information
- Full name: Benedito Aparecido dos Santos
- Date of birth: 7 September 1939
- Place of birth: São José do Rio Pardo, Brazil
- Date of death: unknown
- Place of death: São José da Boa Vista, Brazil

International career
Years	Team	Apps	(Gls)
1963	Brazil	4	(0)

Benedito Aparecido dos Santos, known as Massinha, (born 7 September 1939, date of death unknown) was a Brazilian footballer. He played in four matches for the Brazil national football team in 1963. He was also part of Brazil's squad for the 1963 South American Championship. Massinha is deceased.
