= José Mesiano =

Argentine footballer

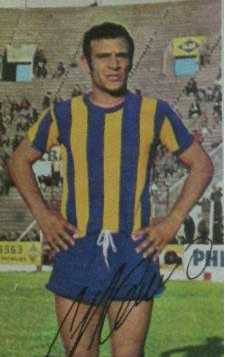

Personal information
- Full name: José Agustín Mesiano
- Date of birth: 1 May 1942
- Date of death: 18 May 2017 (aged 75)
- Position: Midfielder

International career
Years	Team	Apps	(Gls)
1963–1965	Argentina	6	(0)

José Agustín Mesiano (1 May 1942 - 18 May 2017) was an Argentine footballer. He played in six matches for the Argentina national football team from 1963 to 1965. He was also part of Argentina's squad for the 1963 South American Championship.
