= 1966 FIFA World Cup qualification (CONMEBOL – Group 3) =

Football tournament qualification stage

The three teams in this group played against each other on a home-and-away basis. The winner Argentina qualified for the eighth FIFA World Cup held in England.

== Standings ==
Pos	Team	Pld	W	D	L	GF	GA	GD	Pts	Qualification	(Argentina national football team)	(Paraguay national football team)	(Bolivia national football team)
1	Argentina	4	3	1	0	9	2	+7	7	Qualification for 1966 FIFA World Cup	—	3–0	4–1
2	Paraguay	4	1	1	2	3	5	−2	3		0–0	—	2–0
3	Bolivia	4	1	0	3	4	9	−5	2		1–2	2–1	—

Source: AllWorldCup
Rules for classification: Tiebreakers

== Matches ==
25 July 1965

Paraguay	2–0	Bolivia
Rodríguez 24'; Rojas 73'	Report

Asunción, Paraguay
Attendance: 18,398
Referee: José Antonio Sundheim (Colombia)

1 August 1965

Argentina	3–0	Paraguay
González 15' (o.g.); Onega 26'; Artime 35'	Report

Buenos Aires, Argentina
Attendance: 63,817
Referee: Pablo Victor Vaga Albergati (Uruguay)

8 August 1965

Paraguay	0–0	Argentina
	Report

Asunción, Paraguay
Attendance: 20,763
Referee: Antônio Viug (Brazil)

17 August 1965

Argentina	4–1	Bolivia
Bernao 3', 56'; Onega 24' (pen.), 25'	Report	Vargas 55'

Buenos Aires, Argentina
Attendance: 56,173
Referee: Esteban Marino (Uruguay)

22 August 1965

Bolivia	2–1	Paraguay
Quevedo 29'; Castillo 75'	Report	Mora 30'

La Paz, Bolivia
Attendance: 7,000
Referee: Eduardo Rendón Villacis (Ecuador)

29 August 1965

Bolivia	1–2	Argentina
Ramos Delgado 35' (o.g.)	Report	Artime 31', 39'

La Paz, Bolivia
Attendance: 9,690
Referee: Carlos Rivero Ángeles (Peru)

Argentina qualified.
