= Antonio Insfrán =

Paraguayan footballer (born 1942)

Personal information
- Date of birth: 17 January 1942 (age 84)

International career
Years	Team	Apps	(Gls)
1961–1967	Paraguay	14	(0)

Antonio Insfrán (born 17 January 1942) is a Paraguayan footballer. He played in 14 matches for the Paraguay national football team from 1961 to 1967. He was also part of Paraguay's squad for the 1963 South American Championship.
