= José Insfrán =

Paraguayan footballer (born 1949)

Personal information
- Full name: José Domingo Insfrán
- Date of birth: 4 August 1949 (age 77)

International career
Years	Team	Apps	(Gls)
1974–1977	Paraguay	25	(1)

José Domingo Insfrán (born 4 August 1949) is a Paraguayan footballer. He played in eight matches for the Paraguay national football team from 1975 to 1977. He was also part of Paraguay's squad for the 1975 Copa América tournament.

== Career statistics ==
=== International ===
Appearances and goals by national team and year
National team	Year	Apps	Goals
Paraguay	1974	1	0
Paraguay	1975	8	1
Paraguay	1976	6	0
Paraguay	1977	10	0
Total		25	1

Scores and results list Paraguay's goal tally first, score column indicates score after each Insfrán goal.

List of international goals scored by José Insfrán
No.	Date	Venue	Opponent	Score	Result	Competition
1	7 July 1975	Estadio Félix Capriles, Cochabamba, Bolivia	Bolivia	?–?	2–1	Friendly
