= Tião Macalé (footballer) =

Brazilian footballer

Personal information
- Full name: Sebiastião dos Santos
- Date of birth: 23 September 1936
- Date of death: 22 August 1972 (aged 35)

International career
Years	Team	Apps	(Gls)
1963	Brazil	5	(0)

Sebiastião dos Santos (23 September 1936 – 22 August 1972), known as Tião Macalé, was a Brazilian footballer. He played in five matches for the Brazil national football team in 1963. He was also part of Brazil's squad for the 1963 South American Championship.
