= Vicente Flores (footballer) =

Venezuelan footballer (born 1955)

Personal information
- Date of birth: 7 February 1955 (age 71)
- Position: Forward

International career
Years	Team	Apps	(Gls)
1975	Venezuela	1	(0)

Vicente Flores (born 7 February 1955) is a Venezuelan footballer. He played in one match for the Venezuela national football team in 1975. He was also part of Venezuela's squad for the 1975 Copa América tournament.
