= Eulogio Vargas =

Bolivian footballer (1931–2020)

Personal information
- Date of birth: 21 March 1931
- Place of birth: Formosa, Argentina
- Date of death: 26 August 2020 (aged 89)
- Place of death: La Paz, Bolivia
- Position: Midfielder

Senior career*
Years	Team	Apps	(Gls)
1958-1961	The Strongest		
1961-1962	Municipal La Paz		
1966-1967	Bolívar		
1968-1970	Universitario La Paz		

International career
1963	Bolivia	5	(0)
Medal record
Representing Bolivia
Copa América
Winner	1963 Bolivia
- * Club domestic league appearances and goals

Eulogio Vargas (21 March 1931 – 26 August 2020) was an Argentine-born Bolivian footballer. He played in five matches for the Bolivia national football team in 1963. He was also part of Bolivia's squad that won the 1963 South American Championship. Vargas died in La Paz, Bolivia, on 26 August 2020, at the age of 89.

== International career ==
Born in Argentina, he obtained Bolivian citizenship at the beginning of the 1960s.

Vargas was selected in Bolivia's squad for the 1963 South American Championship on home soil.

Vargas played 5 games during the competition, getting his first cap on 10 March against Ecuador. The game against Brazil on 31 March was his fifth and last cap, as Bolivia won the competition, its first and only Copa America.
