= Jorge de Souza (footballer) =

Brazilian footballer (1939–2008)

Personal information
- Date of birth: 20 July 1939
- Date of death: 31 December 2008 (aged 69)
- Place of death: Cabo Frio, Rio de Janeiro, Brazil
- Position: Defender

Senior career*
Years	Team	Apps	(Gls)
1959-1966	America-RJ		
1966-1967	Fluminense		
1968	Portuguesa RJ		

International career
1963	Brazil	6	(0)
- * Club domestic league appearances and goals

Jorge de Souza (20 July 1939 – 31 December 2008), sometimes known as just Jorge, was a Brazilian footballer. He played in six matches for the Brazil national football team in 1963. He was also part of Brazil's squad for the 1963 South American Championship. De Souza died in Cabo Frio, Rio de Janeiro on 31 December 2008, at the age of 69.
