= Arturo López (footballer) =

Bolivian footballer (1935–2026)

Personal information
- Date of birth: 20 May 1936
- Place of birth: Camiri, Bolivia
- Date of death: 8 March 2026 (aged 90)
- Place of death: Cochabamba, Bolivia
- Position: Goalkeeper

Senior career*
Years	Team	Apps	(Gls)
- Chaco Petrolero

International career
1957–1965	Bolivia	20	(0)
Medal record
Representing Bolivia
Copa América
Winner	1963 Bolivia
- * Club domestic league appearances and goals

Arturo López (20 May 1935 – 8 March 2026) was a Bolivian footballer who played as a goalkeeper. He made 20 appearances for the Bolivia national team between 1957 and 1965. He was also part of Bolivia's squad that won the 1963 South American Championship. López died on 8 March 2026, at the age of 90.
