= Eduardo Espinoza (footballer) =

Bolivian footballer (1934–?)

Eduardo Espinosa
Personal information
- Date of birth: 9 January 1934
- Position: Defender

Senior career*
Years	Team	Apps	(Gls)
1961	Jorge Wilstermann		
1962–1963	31 de Octubre		
1966	Deportivo Municipal La Paz		

International career
1963	Bolivia	3	(0)
Medal record
Representing Bolivia
Copa América
Winner	1963 Bolivia
- * Club domestic league appearances and goals

Eduardo Espinosa (born 9 January 1934, date of death unknown) was a Bolivian footballer. He was part of Bolivia's squad that won the 1963 South American Championship on home soil. Espinoza is deceased.

== International career ==
Espinosa was selected in Bolivia's squad for the 1963 South American Championship. Espinoza played three games during the tournament as Bolivia won the competition, its first and only Copa America.

The game against Ecuador on 10 March was his first cap with Bolivia. His second cap was against Colombia on 17 March. The last game of the tournament against Brazil on 31 March was his third and last cap with Bolivia.
