= Cláudio Danni =

Brazilian footballer (1942–2025))

Personal information
- Full name: Cláudio João Danni
- Date of birth: 22 February 1942
- Place of birth: Canoas, Brazil
- Date of death: June 2025 (aged 83)
- Position: Defender

Senior career*
Years	Team	Apps	(Gls)
- Sport Club do Recife
- Cruzeiro
- Corinthians

International career
1963	Brazil	5	(0)
- * Club domestic league appearances and goals

Cláudio João Danni (22 February 1942 – June 2025) was a Brazilian footballer. He played in five matches for the Brazil national football team in 1963. He was also part of Brazil's squad for the 1963 South American Championship. Danni died in June 2025, at the age of 83.
