= Senén Mosquera =

Colombian footballer (1938-2018)

Personal information
- Date of birth: 25 January 1938
- Place of birth: Buenaventura, Colombia
- Date of death: 20 May 2018 (aged 80)
- Height: 1.89 m (6 ft 2 in)
- Position: Goalkeeper

Senior career*
Years	Team	Apps	(Gls)
- Millonarios

International career
1963–1973	Colombia	5	(0)
- * Club domestic league appearances and goals

Senén Mosquera (25 January 1938 – 20 May 2018) was a Colombian footballer. He played in four matches for the Colombia national football team from 1963 to 1973. He was also part of Colombia's squad for the 1963 South American Championship.
