= Ovidio Messa =

Bolivian footballer (1952-2017)

Ovidio Messa Soruco (12 December 1952 – 27 July 2017) was a Bolivian footballer. He was born in Yacuíba, Bolivia. He was known for playing for the Bolivia national football team from 1978 through 1979.

In 1980, Messa is tapped by Club Libertad of Paraguay, later to be transferred to the Club Guaraní of that same country. In 1983, Messa returned to Bolivia and after a brief passage by the Club Bolivar to The Strongest. In 1986 a serious knee injury forced him to retire for a few months from the courts, but in October of that year he decided to retire definitively from the active practice of professional football.

Messa died on 27 July 2017 of pancreatic cancer in Alicante, Spain at the age of 64.
