= Luis Liendo (footballer, born 1949) =

Bolivian footballer (born 1949)

Personal information
- Full name: Luis Ignacio Liendo Moreno
- Date of birth: 18 April 1949 (age 77)
- Place of birth: Córdoba, Argentina
- Position: Midfielder

Youth career
- Instituto

Senior career*
Years	Team	Apps	(Gls)
- Instituto
- Platense
–1969	Instituto		
1970–1974	Chaco Petrolero		
1974–1975	The Strongest		
1975–1976	Bolívar		
1976	Audax Italiano	26	(0)
1977–1979	Deportes La Serena		

International career
1975	Bolivia	3	(0)
- * Club domestic league appearances and goals

Luis Ignacio Liendo Moreno (born 18 April 1949) is an Argentine-Bolivian former footballer who played as a midfielder. He played in three matches for the Bolivia national football team from in 1975. He was also part of Bolivia's squad for the 1975 Copa América tournament.

== Career ==
- Instituto
- Platense
- Instituto ????–1969
- Chaco Petrolero 1970–1974
- The Strongest 1974–1975
- Bolívar 1975–1976
- Audax Italiano 1976
- Deportes La Serena 1977–1979

== Personal life ==
Born in Córdoba, Argentina, Liendo came to Bolivia in 1970 and naturalized Bolivian in 1974. Playing in Chile, he married Mirtha Asbún and they had three children. His sons Luis Jr. and Omar became footballers.

== Honours ==
Chaco Petrolero

- Bolivian Primera División: 1970

The Strongest

- Bolivian Primera División: 1974
