= Wilfredo Camacho =

Bolivian footballer (born 1935)

Personal information
- Date of birth: 21 June 1935 (age 91)
- Position: Midfielder

International career
Years	Team	Apps	(Gls)
1963–1967	Bolivia	9	(0)
Medal record
Representing Bolivia
Copa América
Winner	1963 Bolivia

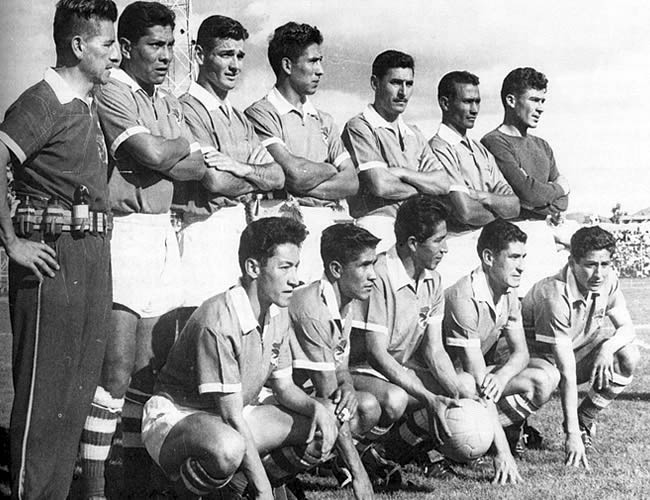
The Bolivian team that won its first Copa América in 1963. Standing: Max Ramírez, Eduardo Espinoza, Wilfredo Camacho, Roberto Caínzo, Eulogio Vargas and Arturo López. Couching: Ramiro Blacutt, Máximo Alcócer, Víctor Agustín Ugarte, Ausberto García and Fortunato Castillo.

Wilfredo Camacho (born 21 June 1935) is a Bolivian former footballer. He played in nine matches for the Bolivia national football team from 1963 to 1967. He was also part of Bolivia's squad that won the 1963 South American Championship.
