= Luis Liendo (footballer, born 1978) =

Chilean-Bolivian footballer

Personal information
- Full name: Luis Antonio Liendo Asbún
- Date of birth: February 25, 1978 (age 48)
- Place of birth: La Serena, Chile
- Height: 1.79 m (5 ft 10 in)
- Position: Midfielder

Youth career
- 1997: Chaco Petrolero
- 1997–1998: Boca Juniors

Senior career*
Years	Team	Apps	(Gls)
1999–2000	Bolívar	31	(8)
2001	The Strongest	4	(0)
2001–2002	Ascoli	3	(0)
2003–2004	Spezia	13	(0)
2004–2005	Novara	18	(0)
2006–2007	Gela	15	(0)
2007–2008	Atlanta Silverbacks	21	(0)
2008–2009	La Paz	30	(0)
2010–2013	Universitario de Sucre	128	(2)
2013–2014	Sport Boys Warnes	18	(0)

International career
1999	Bolivia	6	(0)
- * Club domestic league appearances and goals as of September 14, 203

Luis Antonio Liendo Asbún (born February 25, 1978) is a retired Chilean-Bolivian football midfielder, who has played in different leagues throughout South America, Europe and North America. He also played for the Bolivia national team.

== Club career ==
Liendo began his soccer career in 1997 playing for the Boca Juniors reserves team in Argentina then was signed by Bolívar in Bolivia.

Liendo had a brief experience with Real Madrid B in Spain. Shortly after his time in Spain, he was bought by Ascoli in Italy. He also played for Spezia, Novara and Gela in Italy.

After six years of playing in Italy, Liendo relocated to North America where he played for the USL1 team, Atlanta Silverbacks in 2007. After a couple of seasons in the United States, Liendo returned to Bolivia and signed with La Paz F.C. Towards the end of his career he also played for Universitario de Sucre and Sport Boys Warnes.

== International career ==
Liendo earned 6 caps for the Bolivia national team and was called up by his country for several FIFA World Cup qualification matches, but did not make any appearance

== Personal life ==
Liendo's father, also Luis, played in Argentina, Bolivia and Chile during the 70's and 80's and also played for the Bolivia national team.
