= Ramiro Blacut =

Bolivian footballer (1944–2024)

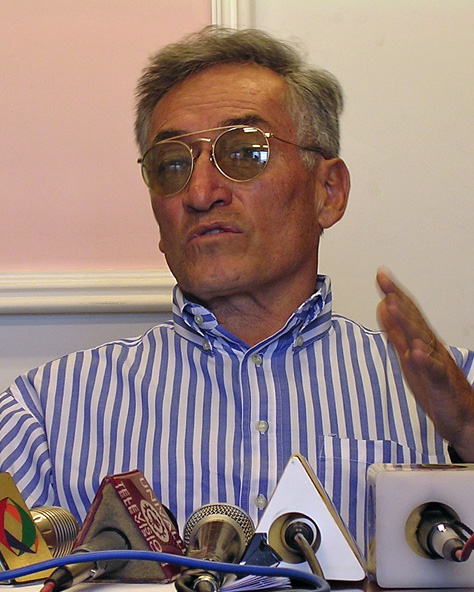
- Blacut in 2004

Personal information
- Full name: Ramiro Blacut Rodríguez
- Date of birth: 3 January 1944
- Place of birth: La Paz, Bolivia
- Date of death: 12 August 2024 (aged 80)
- Position: Forward

Senior career*
Years	Team	Apps	(Gls)
1959–1962	Bolívar		
1963–1965	Ferro Carril Oeste	12+	(1+)
1965–1966	Bayern Munich	0	(0)
1966–1971	Bolívar	21+	(3+)
1972–1973	Melgar	26	(3)
1974	The Strongest		
1975	Universitario de La Paz		

International career
1963–1972	Bolivia	23	(3)

Managerial career
- 1979: Bolívar
- 1979: Oriente Petrolero
- 1979–1981: Bolivia
- 1980–1981: The Strongest
- 1982: Blooming
- 1983: Bolívar
- 1984: Chaco Petrolero
- 1985–1986: Blooming
- 1987: Litoral
- 1988–1989: Bolívar
- 1990: Blooming
- 1991: Bolivia
- 1992: Blooming
- 1994: The Strongest
- 1995: Bolívar
- 1996: The Strongest
- 1998: Guabirá
- 1998: Jorge Wilstermann
- 1999: Real Santa Cruz
- 1999–2000: Aucas
- 2001: El Nacional
- 2002–2003: Deportivo Cuenca
- 2003: Oriente Petrolero
- 2004–2005: Bolivia
- 2005: The Strongest
- 2006: Bolivia U20
Medal record
Men's football
Representing Bolivia
Copa América
Gold medal – first place	1963 Bolivia	Team
- * Club domestic league appearances and goals

Ramiro Blacut Rodríguez (3 January 1944 – 12 August 2024) was a Bolivian professional footballer who played as a forward. He was a member of the Bolivia national team that won the 1963 South American Championship.

== Career ==
During his career, he represented Club Bolívar and The Strongest as well as Argentine club Ferro Carril Oeste from 1963 to 1965. In addition, in 1965–66 he played with Bayern Munich. He earned 23 caps for Bolivia, scoring 3 goals.

== Death ==
Blacut died on 12 August 2024, at the age of 80.
