= Estadio Libertador Simón Bolívar =

Coordinates: 16°30′45″S 68°8′28″W

- Location: La Paz, Bolivia
- Capacity: 5,000 (20,000–25,000 after remodelation)

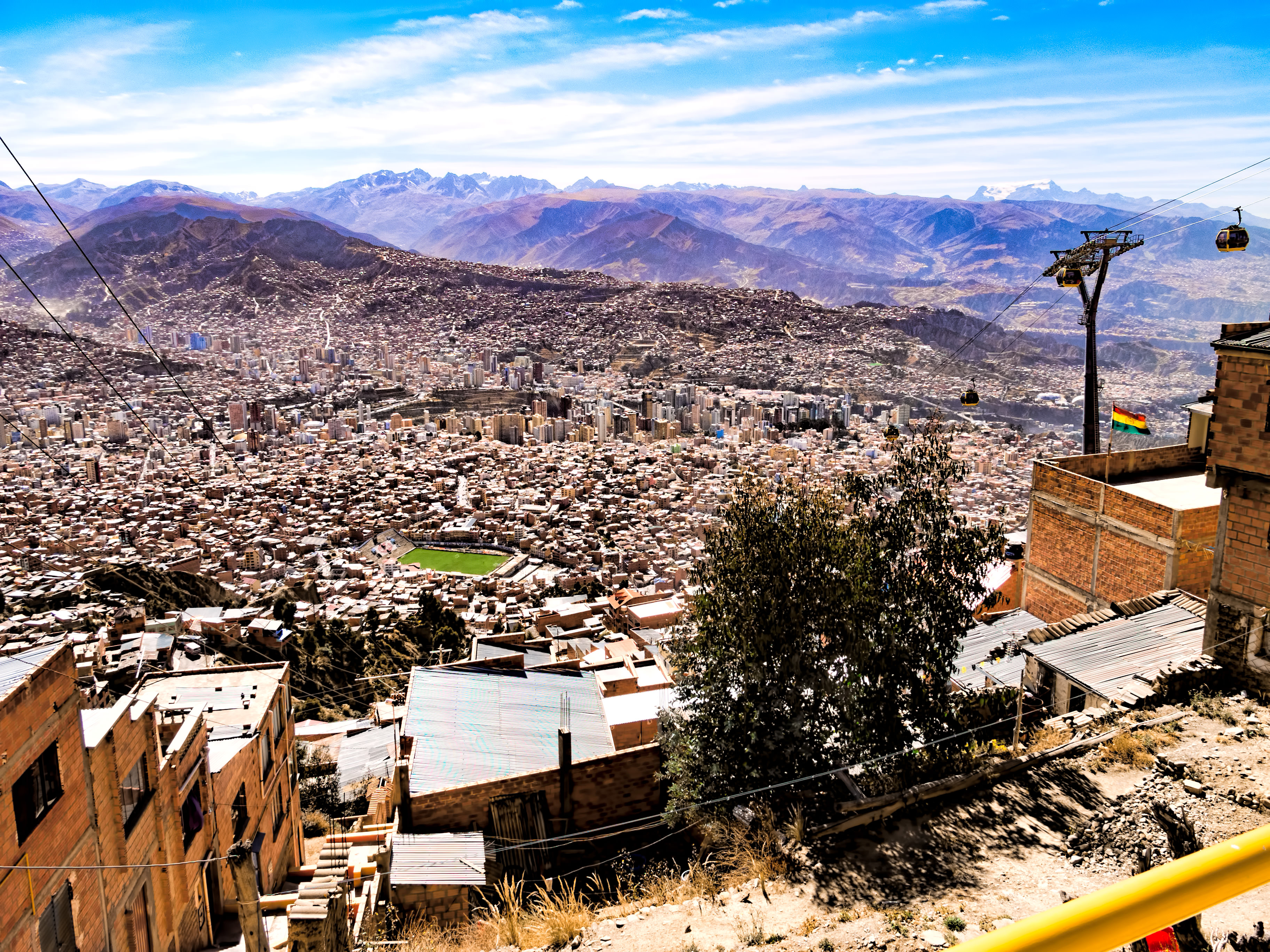
Stadium seen from El Alto, with Teleférico La Paz–El Alto between

Estadio Libertador Simón Bolívar is a multi-use stadium in the Tembladerani neighborhood of the city of La Paz, Bolivia. It is most often used for football matches, on club level by Club Bolívar. The stadium has a capacity of 5,000 people and was founded on 9 February 1968.
