= Fortunato Castillo =

Bolivian footballer (born 1939)

Personal information
- Date of birth: 16 March 1939 (age 87)
- Position: Midfielder

International career
Years	Team	Apps	(Gls)
1963	Bolivia	6	(0)

Fortunato Castillo (born 16 March 1939) is a Bolivian footballer. He played in six matches for the Bolivia national football team in 1963. He was also part of Bolivia's squad that won the 1963 South American Championship.
