= 1959 South American Championship (Argentina) squads =

List of footballers

The following are the squad lists for the countries that played in the 1959 South American Championship held in Argentina. The participating countries were Argentina, Bolivia, Brazil, Chile, Paraguay, Peru and Uruguay.

The teams plays in a single round-robin tournament, earning two points for a win, one point for a draw, and zero points for a loss.

== Argentina ==
Head Coach: (Argentina) Victorio Spinetto, José Della Torre and José Barreiro

No.	Pos.	Player	Date of birth (age)	Caps	Goals	Club
	FW	Raúl Belén	1 July 1931 (aged 27)	0	0	(Argentine Football Association) Racing Club
	GK	Juan Carlos Bertoldi	10 May 1938 (aged 20)	0	0	(Argentine Football Association) Rosario Central
	FW	Roberto Brookes	1 January 1938 (aged 21)	1	1	(Argentine Football Association) Chacarita Juniors
	FW	Pedro Callá	1 January 1934 (aged 25)	0	0	(Argentine Football Association) Argentinos Juniors
	DF	Vladislao Cap	5 July 1934 (aged 24)	0	0	(Argentine Football Association) Racing Club
	DF	Luis Raúl Cardoso	18 July 1930 (aged 28)	4	0	(Argentine Football Association) Boca Juniors
	DF	Néstor Cardoso	17 November 1935 (aged 23)	0	0	(Argentine Football Association) Rosario Central
	FW	Oreste Corbatta	11 March 1936 (aged 22)	27	10	(Argentine Football Association) Racing Club
	MF	Jorge Griffa	9 November 1927 (aged 31)	0	0	(Argentine Football Association) Newell's Old Boys
	MF	Carlos Griguol	4 September 1934 (aged 24)	0	0	(Argentine Football Association) Atlanta
	MF	Osvaldo Güenzatti	23 March 1931 (aged 27)	0	0	(Argentine Football Association) Atlanta
	MF	Juan Francisco Lombardo	11 June 1925 (aged 33)	30	0	(Argentine Football Association) Boca Juniors
	FW	Pedro Manfredini	7 September 1935 (aged 23)	0	0	(Argentine Football Association) Racing Club
	MF	Eliseo Mouriño	3 June 1927 (aged 31)	19	0	(Argentine Football Association) Boca Juniors
	DF	Juan Carlos Murúa	18 July 1935 (aged 23)	0	0	(Argentine Football Association) Racing Club
	FW	Osvaldo Nardiello	31 August 1936 (aged 22)	0	0	(Argentine Football Association) Boca Juniors
	GK	Jorge Negri	30 November 1932 (aged 26)	0	0	(Argentine Football Association) Racing Club
	MF	Julio Alberto Nuín		0	0	(Argentine Football Association) River Plate
	FW	Juan José Pizzuti	9 May 1927 (aged 31)	0	0	(Argentine Football Association) Racing Club
	MF	Juan José Rodríguez	11 January 1937 (aged 22)	0	0	(Argentine Football Association) Boca Juniors
	DF	Carmelo Simeone	22 September 1934 (aged 24)	0	0	(Argentine Football Association) Vélez Sarsfield
	FW	Rubén Sosa	14 November 1936 (aged 22)	0	0	(Argentine Football Association) Racing Club
	MF	José Varacka	27 May 1932 (aged 26)	9	0	(Argentine Football Association) Independiente

== Bolivia ==
Head Coach: (Bolivia) Vicente Arraya

No.	Pos.	Player	Date of birth (age)	Caps	Goals	Club
	FW	Atilio Aguirre		0	0	(Bolivian Football Federation) The Strongest
	DF	Máximo Alcócer	15 April 1933 (aged 25)	0	0	(Bolivian Football Federation) Jorge Wilstermann
	FW	Ricardo Alcón		6	2	(Bolivian Football Federation) Litoral
	FW	Abdul Aramayo	4 September 1934 (aged 24)	0	0	(Bolivian Football Federation) Chaco Petrolero
	DF	Miguel Burgos	9 September 1929 (aged 29)	0	0	(Bolivian Football Federation) The Strongest
	MF	Wilfredo Camacho	21 June 1935 (aged 23)	0	0	(Bolivian Football Federation) Deportivo Municipal
	DF	Óscar Claure	18 January 1933 (aged 26)	0	0	(Bolivian Football Federation) Jorge Wilstermann
	FW	Ausberto García	9 February 1934 (aged 25)	0	0	(Bolivian Football Federation) Jorge Wilstermann
	GK	Arturo López	20 May 1935 (aged 23)	0	0	(Bolivian Football Federation) Bolívar
	FW	Renan López	31 October 1939 (aged 19)	0	0	(Bolivian Football Federation) Jorge Wilstermann
	FW	Mario Mena	28 July 1928 (aged 30)	13	0	(Bolivian Football Federation) Bolívar
	DF	Jorge Montes		0	0	(Bolivian Football Federation) Deportivo Municipal
	DF	Máximo Ramírez	9 June 1933 (aged 25)	0	0	(Bolivian Football Federation) The Strongest
	MF	César Sánchez	29 January 1935 (aged 24)	0	0	(Bolivian Football Federation) Jorge Wilstermann
	DF	Ramón Santos	17 March 1927 (aged 31)	6	2	(Bolivian Football Federation) Bolívar
	GK	Oscar Soliz	14 May 1935 (aged 23)	0	0	(Bolivian Football Federation) The Strongest
	FW	Víctor Ugarte	5 May 1926 (aged 32)	20	7	(Bolivian Football Federation) Bolívar
	FW	Freddy Valda	23 March 1932 (aged 26)	0	0	(Bolivian Football Federation) Chaco Petrolero
	MF	Edgar Vargas	10 August 1929 (aged 29)	6	0	(Bolivian Football Federation) Bolívar
	MF	Raymundo Zenteno		0	0	(Bolivian Football Federation) Deportivo Municipal

== Brazil ==
Head Coach: (Brazil) Vicente Feola

No.	Pos.	Player	Date of birth (age)	Caps	Goals	Club
	FW	Almir Pernambuquinho	28 October 1937 (aged 21)	0	0	(Brazilian Football Confederation) Vasco da Gama
	DF	Hilderaldo Bellini	7 June 1930 (aged 28)	14	0	(Brazilian Football Confederation) Vasco da Gama
	GK	Carlos José Castilho	27 November 1927 (aged 31)	19	0	(Brazilian Football Confederation) Fluminense
	DF	Chico Formiga	11 November 1930 (aged 28)	13	0	(Brazilian Football Confederation) Palmeiras
	MF	Chinesinho	15 September 1935 (aged 23)	3	4	(Brazilian Football Confederation) Palmeiras
	DF	Coronel	27 January 1935 (aged 24)	0	0	(Brazilian Football Confederation) Vasco da Gama
	MF	Décio Esteves	21 May 1927 (aged 31)	0	0	(Brazilian Football Confederation) Bangu
	MF	Didí	8 October 1928 (aged 30)	47	16	(Brazilian Football Confederation) Botafogo
	MF	Dino Sani	23 May 1932 (aged 26)	7	0	(Brazilian Football Confederation) São Paulo
	DF	Djalma Santos	23 February 1929 (aged 30)	48	2	(Brazilian Football Confederation) Portuguesa
	DF	Dorval	26 February 1935 (aged 24)	0	0	(Brazilian Football Confederation) Santos
	FW	Garrincha	28 October 1933 (aged 25)	12	0	(Brazilian Football Confederation) Botafogo
	GK	Gilmar	22 August 1930 (aged 25)	37	0	(Brazilian Football Confederation) Corinthians
	FW	Henrique	3 August 1933 (aged 25)	0	0	(Brazilian Football Confederation) Flamengo
	DF	Mauro Ramos	30 August 1930 (aged 28)	10	0	(Brazilian Football Confederation) São Paulo
	DF	Nílton Santos	16 May 1925 (aged 33)	52	2	(Brazilian Football Confederation) Botafogo
	DF	Orlando	20 September 1935 (aged 23)	7	0	(Brazilian Football Confederation) Vasco da Gama
	DF	Paulinho	15 April 1932 (aged 26)	8	1	(Brazilian Football Confederation) Vasco da Gama
	FW	Paulo Valentim	20 November 1932 (aged 26)	0	0	(Brazilian Football Confederation) Botafogo
	FW	Pelé	23 October 1940 (aged 18)	9	11	(Brazilian Football Confederation) Santos
	FW	Mário Zagallo	9 August 1931 (aged 27)	9	3	(Brazilian Football Confederation) Botafogo
	MF	Zito	8 August 1932 (aged 26)	12	1	(Brazilian Football Confederation) Santos

== Chile ==
Head Coach: (Chile) Fernando Riera

No.	Pos.	Player	Date of birth (age)	Caps	Goals	Club
	FW	Luis Hernán Álvarez	21 May 1938 (aged 20)	0	0	(Football Federation of Chile) Colo Colo
	GK	Raúl Coloma	9 July 1928 (aged 30)	0	0	(Football Federation of Chile) Ferrobádminton
	DF	Luis Eyzaguirre	22 June 1939 (aged 19)	0	0	(Football Federation of Chile) Universidad de Chile
	FW	Carlos Hoffmann	5 May 1936 (aged 22)	0	0	(Football Federation of Chile) Santiago Wanderers
	FW	Mario Moreno	31 December 1935 (aged 23)	0	0	(Football Federation of Chile) Colo Colo
	DF	Sergio Navarro	20 November 1936 (aged 22)	2	0	(Football Federation of Chile) Universidad de Chile
	DF	Hernán Rodríguez	2 May 1933 (aged 25)	1	0	(Football Federation of Chile) Colo Colo
	MF	Eladio Rojas	11 August 1934 (aged 24)	0	0	(Football Federation of Chile) Everton
	MF	Juan Rojas	11 June 1935 (aged 23)	3	0	(Football Federation of Chile) Deportes La Serena
	FW	Leonel Sánchez	25 April 1936 (aged 22)	18	2	(Football Federation of Chile) Universidad de Chile
	DF	Raúl Sánchez	26 October 1933 (aged 25)	0	0	(Football Federation of Chile) Santiago Wanderers
	FW	Juan Soto	27 April 1937 (aged 21)	1	0	(Football Federation of Chile) Colo Colo
	FW	Mario Soto	16 July 1933 (aged 25)	0	0	(Football Federation of Chile) Universidad Católica
	FW	Armando Tobar	7 June 1938 (aged 20)	0	0	(Football Federation of Chile) Santiago Wanderers
	MF	Jorge Toro	10 January 1939 (aged 20)	0	0	(Football Federation of Chile) Colo Colo
	DF	Mario Torres	20 June 1931 (aged 27)	9	0	(Football Federation of Chile) Audax Italiano
	DF	Sergio Valdés	22 June 1935 (aged 23)	3	0	(Football Federation of Chile) Magallanes
	MF	Luis Vera	22 December 1929 (aged 29)	9	0	(Football Federation of Chile) Audax Italiano
	FW	Carlos Verdejo	10 February 1934 (aged 25)	2	2	(Football Federation of Chile) Deportes La Serena

== Paraguay ==
Head Coach: (Paraguay) Aurelio González

No.	Pos.	Player	Date of birth (age)	Caps	Goals	Club
—	GK	Samuel Aguilar	16 March 1933 (aged 25)	2	0	(Paraguayan Football Association) Libertad
—	DF	Edelmiro Arévalo	7 January 1929 (aged 30)	4	0	(Paraguayan Football Association) Olimpia
—	FW	José Aveiro	18 July 1936 (aged 22)	0	0	(Paraguayan Football Association) Sportivo Luqueño
—	FW	Juan Cañete	27 July 1929 (aged 29)	10	0	(Brazilian Football Confederation) Vasco da Gama
—	GK	Honario Casco		1	0	(Paraguayan Football Association) Cerro Porteño
—	FW	Luis Doldán	19 January 1938 (aged 21)	0	0	(Paraguayan Football Association) Sportivo Iteño
—	DF	Eligio Echagüe	31 December 1931 (aged 27)	7	0	(Paraguayan Football Association) Olimpia
—	DF	Luis Gini	31 October 1935 (aged 23)	0	0	(Paraguayan Football Association) Sol de América
—	FW	Eligio Insfrán	27 October 1935 (aged 23)	0	0	(Paraguayan Football Association) Guaraní
—	MF	Ángel Jara Saguier	10 January 1936 (aged 23)	0	0	(Paraguayan Football Association) Cerro Porteño
—	MF	Enrique Jara Saguier	12 July 1934 (aged 24)	7	1	(Paraguayan Football Association) Cerro Porteño
—	DF	Juan Lezcano	5 April 1937 (aged 21)	3	0	(Paraguayan Football Association) Olimpia
—	MF	Silvio Parodi	6 November 1931 (aged 24)	1	0	(Brazilian Football Confederation) Vasco da Gama
—	FW	Gilberto Penayo	3 April 1933 (aged 22)	0	0	(Paraguayan Football Association) Cerro Porteño
—	FW	Cayetano Ré	7 February 1938 (aged 21)	3	1	(Paraguayan Football Association) Cerro Porteño
—	MF	Carlos Sanabria	12 July 1938 (aged 20)	0	0	(Paraguayan Football Association) Guaraní
—	FW	Ildefonso Sanabria		0	0	(Paraguayan Football Association) Guaraní
—	MF	Osvaldo Sánchez		0	0	(Paraguayan Football Association) Olimpia
—	MF	Salvador Villalba	29 August 1924 (aged 34)	13	1	(Paraguayan Football Association) Libertad

== Peru ==
Head Coach: (Hungary) György Orth

No.	Pos.	Player	Date of birth (age)	Caps	Goals	Club
	DF	Isaac Andrade	13 July 1937 (aged 21)	3	1	(Peruvian Football Federation) Sport Boys
	GK	Rafael Asca	24 October 1924 (aged 34)	11	0	(Peruvian Football Federation) Sporting Cristal
	MF	Víctor Benítez	30 October 1936 (aged 22)	1	0	(Peruvian Football Federation) Alianza Lima
	DF	Adolfo Calenzani	11 September 1936 (aged 22)	0	0	(Peruvian Football Federation) Sport Boys
	FW	José Carrasco		0	0	(Peruvian Football Federation) Deportivo Municipal
	FW	Juan de la Vega	10 March 1934 (aged 24)	0	0	(Peruvian Football Federation) Alianza Lima
	DF	Alipio Escate		0	0	(Peruvian Football Federation) Sporting Cristal
	DF	José Fernández	14 February 1939 (aged 20)	0	0	(Peruvian Football Federation) Universitario de Deportes
	MF	Guillermo Fleming	9 April 1934 (aged 24)	5	0	(Peruvian Football Federation) Deportivo Municipal
	DF	Enrique Flores		0	0	(Peruvian Football Federation) Alianza Lima
	FW	Óscar Gómez Sánchez	31 October 1935 (aged 23)	16	11	(Peruvian Football Federation) Alianza Lima
	MF	Manuel Grimaldo	2 January 1940 (aged 19)	0	0	(Peruvian Football Federation) Alianza Lima
	FW	Tomás Iwasaki	13 November 1937 (aged 21)	0	0	(Peruvian Football Federation) Universitario de Deportes
	FW	Juan Joya	25 February 1934 (aged 25)	1	0	(Peruvian Football Federation) Alianza Lima
	FW	Miguel Ángel Loayza	21 June 1938 (aged 20)	0	0	(Peruvian Football Federation) Ciclista Lima
	MF	Claudio Lostaunau	1 March 1939 (aged 20)	0	0	(Peruvian Football Federation) Deportivo Municipal
	MF	Óscar Montalvo	20 March 1937 (aged 21)	0	0	(Peruvian Football Federation) Deportivo Municipal
	MF	Dante Rovai	10 June 1928 (aged 30)	3	0	(Peruvian Football Federation) Sporting Cristal
	FW	Juan Seminario	22 July 1936 (aged 22)	14	1	(Peruvian Football Federation) Deportivo Municipal
	MF	Alberto Terry	16 May 1929 (aged 29)	18	11	(Peruvian Football Federation) Sporting Cristal
	FW	Alonso Urdániga	30 October 1936 (aged 22)	0	0	(Peruvian Football Federation) Sport Boys
	GK	Dimas Zegarra	19 December 1932 (aged 26)	5	0	(Peruvian Football Federation) Universitario de Deportes

== Uruguay ==
Head Coach: (Uruguay) Héctor Castro

No.	Pos.	Player	Date of birth (age)	Caps	Goals	Club
	FW	Zelmar Aguilera		0	0	(Uruguayan Football Association) Sud América
	DF	Esteban Álvarez		1	0	(Uruguayan Football Association) Defensor Sporting
	MF	Eladio Benítez	24 February 1939 (aged 20)	2	0	(Uruguayan Football Association) Racing de Montevideo
	FW	Carlos Borges	14 January 1932 (aged 27)	22	1	(Uruguayan Football Association) Peñarol
	FW	Julio Castillo		0	0	(Uruguayan Football Association) Rampla Juniors
	DF	Walter Davoine	27 March 1935 (aged 23)	0	0	(Uruguayan Football Association) Peñarol
	MF	Héctor Demarco	31 May 1936 (aged 22)	7	0	(Uruguayan Football Association) Defensor Sporting
	FW	Vladas Douksas	14 March 1933 (aged 25)	0	0	(Uruguayan Football Association) Rampla Juniors
	FW	Guillermo Escalada	24 April 1936 (aged 22)	4	3	(Uruguayan Football Association) Nacional
	FW	Roque Fernández		3	0	(Uruguayan Football Association) Nacional
	MF	Néstor Gonçalves	27 April 1936 (aged 22)	5	0	(Uruguayan Football Association) Peñarol
	FW	Víctor Guaglianone	24 September 1936 (aged 22)	0	0	(Uruguayan Football Association) Montevideo Wanderers
	GK	Juan Carlos Leiva	22 May 1933 (aged 25)	0	0	(Uruguayan Football Association) Rampla Juniors
	DF	William Martínez	13 January 1928 (aged 31)	23	0	(Uruguayan Football Association) Peñarol
	DF	Juan Carlos Mesías	6 July 1933 (aged 25)	0	0	(Uruguayan Football Association) Nacional
	MF	Luis Miramontes	15 December 1928 (aged 30)	15	0	(Uruguayan Football Association) Defensor Sporting
	FW	Héctor Núñez	8 May 1936 (aged 22)	2	0	(Uruguayan Football Association) Nacional
	FW	Domingo Pérez	7 June 1936 (aged 22)	0	0	(Uruguayan Football Association) Rampla Juniors
	MF	Clímaco Rodríguez		2	0	(Uruguayan Football Association) Defensor Sporting
	FW	José Sasía	27 December 1933 (aged 25)	11	1	(Uruguayan Football Association) Defensor Sporting
	MF	Alcides Silveira	18 March 1938 (aged 20)	0	0	(Uruguayan Football Association) Sud América
	GK	Walter Taibo	7 March 1931 (aged 28)	9	0	(Uruguayan Football Association) Nacional
