= 1959 in Brazilian football =

Football in Brazil
- Season: 1959

The following article presents a summary of the 1959 football (soccer) season in Brazil, which was the 58th season of competitive football in the country.

== Taça Brasil ==
Semifinals

Team #1	Agg	Team #2	1st leg	2nd leg	3rd leg
Santos	4-1	Grêmio	4-1	0-0	-
Vasco da Gama	2-3	Bahia	0-1	2-1	0-1

Final

December 10, 1959

Santos	2–3	Bahia

December 30, 1959

Bahia	0–2	Santos

March 3, 1960

Santos	1–3	Bahia

Bahia declared as the Taça Brasil champions by aggregate score of 5-5.

== Torneio Rio-São Paulo ==
Final Standings

Position	Team	Points	Played	Won	Drawn	Lost	For	Against	Difference
1	Santos	13	9	6	1	2	24	16	8
2	Vasco da Gama	12	9	4	4	1	12	6	6
3	Flamengo	11	9	5	1	3	24	15	9
4	Palmeiras	10	9	5	0	4	17	19	-2
5	São Paulo	10	9	4	2	3	23	22	1
6	America-RJ	9	9	4	1	4	19	23	-4
7	Botafogo	8	9	4	0	5	15	16	-1
8	Fluminense	6	9	2	2	5	13	14	-1
9	Corinthians	6	9	2	2	5	10	21	-11
10	Portuguesa	5	9	2	1	6	16	21	-5

Santos declared as the Torneio Rio-São Paulo champions.

== State championship champions ==
State	Champion	State	Champion
Acre	Independência	Paraíba	Estrela do Mar
Alagoas	Capelense	Paraná	Coritiba
Amapá	Macapá	Pernambuco	Santa Cruz
Amazonas	Auto Esporte	Piauí	River
Bahia	Bahia	Rio de Janeiro	Fonseca
Brasília	Brasiliense (Núcleo Bandeirante)	Rio de Janeiro (DF)	Fluminense
Ceará	Fortaleza	Rio Grande do Norte	ABC
Espírito Santo	Rio Branco-ES	Rio Grande do Sul	Grêmio
Goiás	Goiânia	Rondônia	Ypiranga-RO
Maranhão	Moto Club	Roraima	-
Mato Grosso	Mixto	Santa Catarina	Paula Ramos
Mato Grosso do Sul	-	São Paulo	Palmeiras
Minas Gerais	Cruzeiro	Sergipe	Santa Cruz-SE
Pará	Paysandu	Tocantins	-

== Other competition champions ==
Competition	Champion
Campeonato Brasileiro de Seleções Estaduais	São Paulo

== Brazil national team ==
The following table lists all the games played by the Brazil national football team in official competitions and friendly matches during 1959.

Date	Opposition	Result	Score	Brazil scorers	Competition
March 10, 1959	Peru	D	2-2	Didi, Pelé	South American Championship
March 15, 1959	Chile	W	3-0	Pelé (2), Didi	South American Championship
March 21, 1959	Bolivia	W	4-2	Paulo Valentim (2), Pelé, Didi	South American Championship
March 26, 1959	Uruguay	W	3-1	Paulo Valentim (3)	South American Championship
March 29, 1959	Paraguay	W	4-1	Pelé (3), Chinesinho	South American Championship
April 4, 1959	Argentina	D	1-1	Pelé	South American Championship
May 13, 1959	England	W	2-0	Julinho, Henrique Frade	International Friendly
May 13, 1959	Chile	W	7-0	Pelé (3), Quarentinha (2), Dino Sani, Dorval	Bernardo O'Higgins Cup
May 20, 1959	Chile	W	1-0	Quarentinha	Bernardo O'Higgins Cup
December 5, 1959	Paraguay	W	3-2	Paulo (2), Zé de Mello	South American Championship
December 12, 1959	Uruguay	L	0-3	-	South American Championship
December 19, 1959	Ecuador	W	3-1	Geraldo, Paulo, Zé de Mello	South American Championship
December 22, 1959	Argentina	L	1-4	Geraldo	South American Championship
December 27, 1959	Ecuador	W	2-1	Traçaia, Zé de Mello	International Friendly
