= 1959 South American Championship =

1959 South American Championship may refer to:

- 1959 South American Championship (Argentina), held from 7 March to 4 April
- 1959 South American Championship (Ecuador), held from 5 to 25 December
