= Juan Rojas =

Juan Rojas may refer to:

- Juan Rojas (bishop) (died 1578)
- Juan Rojas (footballer, born 1935), Chilean footballer
- Juan Rojas (footballer, born 1957), Chilean footballer
- Juan Rojas (Paraguayan footballer) (born 1945)
- Juan Pablo Rojas Paúl (1826–1905), president of Venezuela from 1888 to 1890
- Juan Rodrigo Rojas (born 1988), Paraguayan footballer

== See also ==
- Rojas (surname)
- Estadio Municipal Juan Rojas in Almería, Spain
