= Negri =

Negri may refer to:

- Negri (surname), including a list of individuals with the name
- Negri bodies, in microbiology
- Negri, Bacău, a commune and a village in Bacău County, Romania
- Negeri Sembilan, alternatively spelt Negri Sembilan, a state in Malaysia
- Edsel Torres Gomez, a Puerto Rican drug dealer, nicknamed Negri
