= Patricio Yáñez =

Chilean footballer (born 1961)

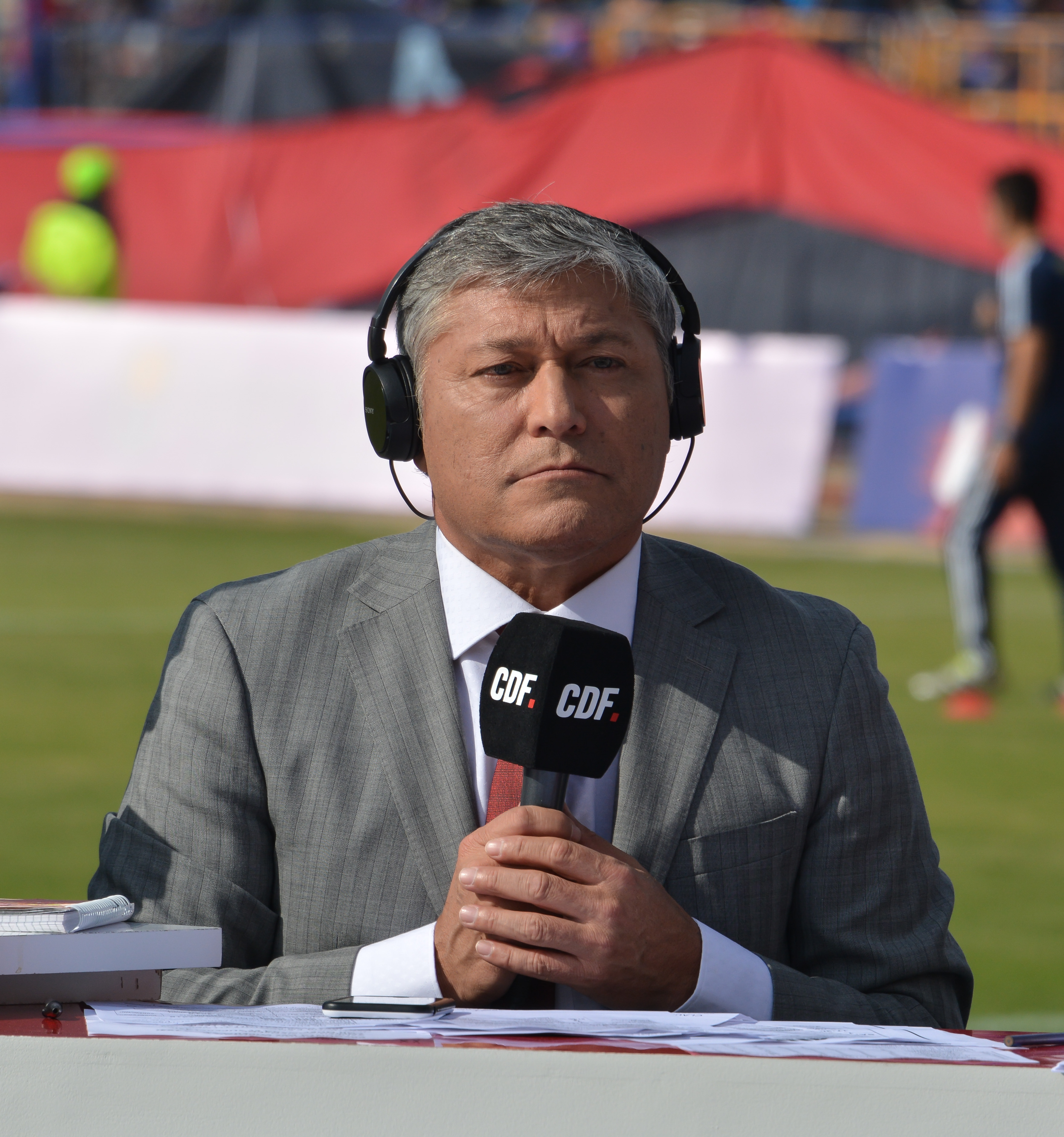
- Yáñez in 2018

Personal information
- Full name: Patricio Nazario Yáñez Candia
- Date of birth: January 20, 1961 (age 65)
- Place of birth: Valparaíso, Chile
- Positions: Forward; winger

Youth career
- Muskrat
- Alto Florida
- San Luis

Senior career*
Years	Team	Apps	(Gls)
1977–1982	San Luis		
1982–1986	Real Valladolid	138	(18)
1985–1986	→ Real Zaragoza (loan)	29	(4)
1987–1989	Real Betis	55	(3)
1990	Universidad de Chile	13	(1)
1991–1995	Colo-Colo	106	(21)

International career
1979–1994	Chile	43	(5)
- * Club domestic league appearances and goals

Patricio Nazario Yáñez Candia (born January 20, 1961) is a Chilean former footballer who played as a forward.

== Club career ==
At youth level, Yáñez competed in athletics, reaching 11.8 seconds in 100 metres, aged 14. As a youth football player, he was with Muskrat from Puerto Williams and Deportivo Alto Florida from Quilpué before joining the San Luis de Quillota youth system.

Yáñez began his career in 1977 with San Luis and won the Copa Apertura Segunda División and Chilean Segunda División in 1980. He moved to Spain to play for Real Valladolid, and won the Copa de la Liga in 1984. For the 1985–86 season, he went on loan to Real Zaragoza, before playing for Real Betis. In 1990, he returned to Chile, briefly playing for Universidad de Chile, before ending his career with Colo-Colo. During his time there, he won the Chilean Primera División twice and the Copa Chile, Copa Libertadores and Recopa Sudamericana once.

== International career ==
Yáñez appeared 43 times for the national team, scoring five goals. He made his debut on June 13, 1979, in a friendly against Ecuador, replacing Jorge Neumann, and had his last match on November 16, 1994, against Argentina. He played for his native country in the 1982 FIFA World Cup.

=== El Pato Yáñez incident ===
In 1989, during the infamous incident involving the goalkeeper Roberto Rojas in a match against Brazil, Yáñez, under the frustration of believing his team was subject to unfairness, performed a gesture to the Brazilian fans by holding his genitals with both of his hands and his middle body slightly bent towards the front in an act of sexual intercourse. The moment was captured by Chilean national television, and as years have passed, the offensive gesture, when repeated or remembered, is known as "Pato Yáñez".

== Post-retirement ==
Following his retirement from football, Yáñez has mainly worked in TV and radio media as a football commentator. He has worked for the Chilean TV channels TVN, Canal 13, Chilevisión, Telecanal and Vive! Deportes, in addition to the Canal del Fútbol from 2014 to 2019. Also, he has worked for the international channels Fox Sports Chile, DirecTV Sports and ESPN Chile. In radio media he has worked for Radio Agricultura and Radio Bío-Bío.

== Honours ==
San Luis

- Copa Apertura Segunda División (1): 1980
- Chilean Segunda División (1): 1980

Real Valladolid

- Copa de la Liga (1): 1984

Colo-Colo

- Chilean Primera División (2): 1991, 1993
- Copa Chile (1): 1994
- Copa Libertadores (1): 1991
- Recopa Sudamericana (1): 1992

Chile

- Copa Juan Pinto Durán (1): 1979
