= Atilio =

Atilio is a given name and surname. Notable people with the name include:

Given name:

- Atilio Aguirre (died 2003), Bolivian footballer
- Atilio Ancheta (born 1948), singer and former footballer from Uruguay
- Atilio Badalini (1899–1953), Argentine footballer
- Atilio Benedetti (born 1955), Argentine bromatologist, businessman and politician
- Atilio Benítez (born 1958), Salvadoran General, ambassador, former Minister of Defense of El Salvador
- Atilio Borón, Argentine Marxist sociologist
- Atilio Boveri (born 1885), Argentine painter, engraver, ceramist, architect, historian, journalist, writer
- Juan Atilio Bramuglia (1903–1962), Argentine labor lawyer, Minister of Foreign Affairsunder President Juan Perón
- Atilio Cáceres (born 1981), Paraguayan footballer
- Atilio Cattáneo (1889–1957), Argentine soldier and politician, pioneer of aviation
- Atilio Cremaschi (1923–2007), Chilean footballer
- Atilio Demaria (1909–1990), Italian Argentine footballer
- Atilio Ensunza (1937–1999), Argentine rower
- Atilio François (1922–1997), Uruguayan cyclist
- Atilio García (1914–1973), Argentine born Uruguayan naturalized footballer
- Atilio Herrera (born 1951), Argentine-Chilean former professional footballer
- Atilio Lombardo (1902–1984), Uruguayan professor, botanist and agrostologist
- Atilio López (1925–2016), Paraguayan football striker and coach
- Atilio Maccarone (1900–1960), Argentine footballer
- Atilio Malinverno (1890–1936), Argentine painter
- Atilio Munari (1901–1941), Brazilian paleontologist
- Atilio Rinaldi (died 1980), Argentine film editor
- Leandro Atilio Romagnoli (born 1981), Argentine former professional footballer
- Atilio Stampone (1926–2022), Argentine pianist, composer, and arranger prominent in the Tango genre
- Atilio Tass (born 1957), Argentine fencer
- Atilio Vásquez (born 1959), Argentine sprint canoeist

Surname:

- Pedro Rivail Atílio (born 1961), Brazilian hammer thrower

== See also ==
- Estadio Atilio Paiva Olivera, multi-use stadium in Rivera, Uruguay
- Doctor Atilio Oscar Viglione, village and municipality in Chubut Province in southern Argentina
- Atilio Vivacqua, Brazilian municipality in the state of Espírito Santo
