= Carlos Vásquez =

Carlos Vásquez may refer to:

- Carlos Vásquez (baseball) (born 1982), Minor League baseball pitcher
- Carlos Vásquez (basketball) (1942–1984), Peruvian Olympic basketball player
- Carlos Vásquez (Chilean footballer) (born 1950), Chilean football forward
- Carlos Vásquez (Uruguayan footballer) (born 1962), Uruguayan football defender
- Carlos Vásquez (taekwondo) (born 1982), Venezuelan taekwondo practitioner
