= Juan Leiva =

Juan Leiva is the name of

- Juan Leiva (athlete) (born 1932), Venezuelan sprinter and hurdler
- Juan Leiva (footballer) (born 1993), Chilean footballer
- Juan Carlos Leiva (born 1933), Uruguayan footballer
