= Negri (surname) =

Negri is an Italian surname. Notable people with the surname include:

- Ada Negri (1870–1945), Italian poet
- Adelaida Negri (1943–2019), Argentine soprano
- Antenore Negri (1898–1970), Italian Olympic runner
- Antonio Negri (1933–2023), Italian political philosopher
- Cesare Negri (c. 1535–c. 1605), Italian dancer and choreographer
- Costache Negri (1812–1876), Romanian writer and politician
- Diego Negri (born 1971), Italian Olympic sailor
- Francesco Negri (disambiguation) (several people)
- Franco Negri (born 1995), Argentine footballer
- Gaetano Negri (1838–1902), Italian geologist, writer, and politician
- Giovanni Negri (born 1957), Italian politician
- Joe Negri (born 1926), American jazz guitarist
- Jorge Negri (1933–2013), Argentine footballer
- Luca Negri (born 1973), Italian Olympic sprint canoer
- Luigi Negri (bishop) (1941–2021), Italian Roman Catholic prelate
- Luigi Negri (politician) (born 1956), Italian architect and politician
- Marcantonio Negri (died 1624), Italian composer of the early Baroque era
- Marco Negri (born 1970), Italian association football player
- Marco Negri (volleyball) (born 1955), Italian volleyball player
- Mario Negri (born 1954), Argentine politician
- Mario De Negri (1901–1978), Italian Olympic sprint runner
- Nina Negri (1901–1981), Argentine-French artist
- Paride Negri (1883–1954), Italian general during World War II
- Pola Negri (1897–1987), Polish film actress
- Sara Negri (born 1967), Italian mathematical logician in Finland
- Sebastian Negri (born 1994), Italian rugby player

== See also ==
- Negris, Greek surname
