= Jorge Neumann =

Chilean footballer (born 1955)

Personal information
- Full name: Jorge Gonzalo Neumann Labrín
- Date of birth: 30 June 1955 (age 71)
- Place of birth: Santiago, Chile
- Position: Right winger

Senior career*
Years	Team	Apps	(Gls)
1974–1977	Universidad de Chile	63	(5)
1978–1983	Unión Española	151	(23)
1984–1985	Deportes Arica	49	(6)
1986–1967	Unión Española	43	(5)
1988	Deportes Concepción	9	(0)
Total		315	(39)

International career
1979	Chile	3	(0)
- * Club domestic league appearances and goals

Jorge Gonzalo Neumann Labrín (born 30 June 1955) is a Chilean former footballer who played as a right winger.

== Career ==
While at Universidad de Chile, Neumann scored in a 5–4 defeat against Colo-Colo, where Manuel Pellegrini notably scored an own goal.

Neumann made three appearances for the Chile national team, including twice against Uruguay in the 1979 Copa Juan Pinto Durán. In his debut against Ecuador on 13 June 1979, he was replaced by substitute Patricio Yáñez, who was also making his debut for Chile.
