= Manuel Grimaldo =

Peruvian footballer (1940–2023)

Personal information
- Full name: Manuel Grimaldo León
- Date of birth: 2 January 1940 (age 86)
- Place of birth: Lima, Peru
- Position: Midfielder

Senior career*
Years	Team	Apps	(Gls)
1958–1967	Alianza Lima		
1968–1970	Bolívar		

International career
1959–1965	Peru	11	(0)
- * Club domestic league appearances and goals

Manuel Grimaldo León (born on 2 January 1940) is a Peruvian professional footballer who played as midfielder.

== Playing career ==
=== Club career ===
Manuel Grimaldo distinguished himself at Alianza Lima in the 1960s, winning three Peruvian championships in 1962, 1963, and 1965. He also played in two Copa Libertadores tournaments with Alianza in 1964 and 1966 (12 matches in total).

In 1968, he moved to Bolivia to play for Club Bolívar. Winning the Bolivian championship that same year, he participated in two consecutive Copa Libertadores tournaments with the Bolivian club in 1969 and 1970 (four matches played in total).

=== International career ===
Peruvian international Manuel Grimaldo played 11 times for the Peruvian national team between 1959 and 1965. He notably participated in the 1959 South American Championship in Argentina where he played five matches.

== Honours ==
Alianza Lima

- Peruvian Primera División (3): 1962, 1963, 1965

Club Bolívar

- Bolivian Primera División: 1968
