= Juan Carlos Mesías =

Uruguayan footballer (1933–2002)

Personal information
- Date of birth: 6 July 1933
- Date of death: 21 April 2002 (aged 68)
- Position: Defender

International career
Years	Team	Apps	(Gls)
1959–1960	Uruguay	15	(0)

Juan Carlos Mesías (6 July 1933 – 21 April 2002) was a Uruguayan footballer. He played in 15 matches for the Uruguay national football team from 1959 to 1960. He was also part of Uruguay's squad for the 1959 South American Championship that took place in Argentina.
