= Osvaldo Güenzatti =

Argentine footballer (1931–2025)

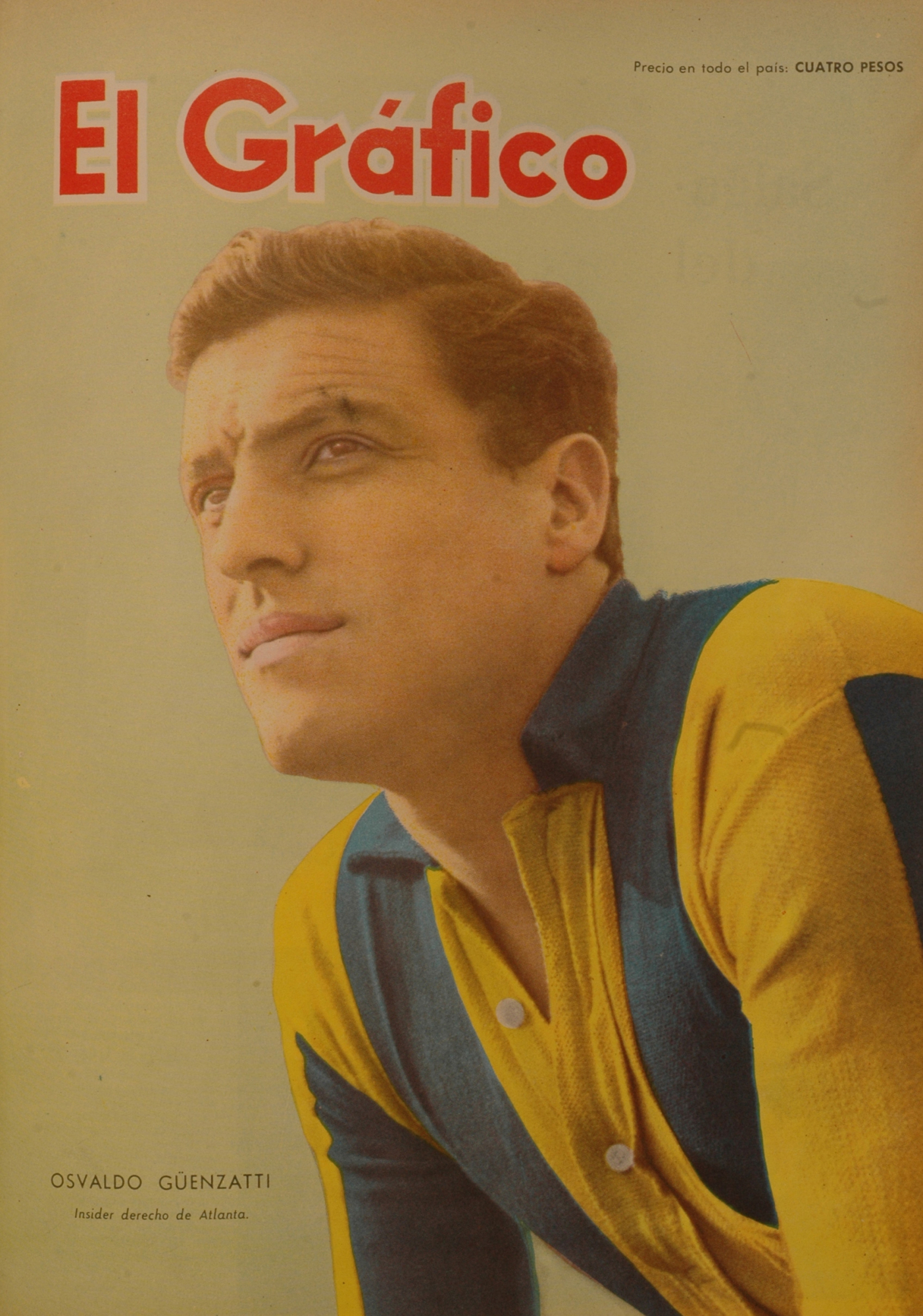

Personal information
- Date of birth: 23 March 1931
- Place of birth: Buenos Aires, Argentina
- Date of death: 21 April 2025 (aged 94)

International career
Years	Team	Apps	(Gls)
1959	Argentina	2	(0)

Osvaldo Güenzatti (23 March 1931 – 21 April 2025) was an Argentine footballer. He played in two matches for the Argentina national football team in 1959. He was also part of Argentina's squad for the 1959 South American Championship that took place in Argentina.

Güenzatti died on 21 April 2025, at the age of 94.
