= Atilio Aguirre =

Bolivian footballer (died before 2003)

Atilio Antonio Aguirre
Personal information
- Position: Forward

Senior career*
Years	Team	Apps	(Gls)
1959–1962	The Strongest		
1962–1964	Deportivo Municipal		
1965	The Strongest	4	(0)
1966	Deportivo Municipal	10	(3)

International career
1959–1965	Bolivia	12	(0)
Medal record
Representing Bolivia
Copa América
Winner	1963 Bolivia
- * Club domestic league appearances and goals

Antonio Atilio Aguirre (died before March 2003) was a Bolivian footballer. He was part of Bolivia's squad that won the 1963 South American Championship on home soil.

== International career ==
Aguirre was part of Bolivia's squad for the 1959 South American Championship in Argentina. He played four games in the tournament, against Uruguay, Argentina, Chile and Peru as Bolivia finished last of the tournament.

Aguirre was again in Bolivia's squad for the 1963 South American Championship held on home soil. He only played one game in the tournament, against Colombia national football team, as Bolivia won the competition, its only title to date.
