= Jorge Negri =

Argentine footballer (1933–2013)

Personal information
- Full name: Jorge Osvaldo Negri
- Date of birth: 3 June 1933
- Place of birth: Buenos Aires, Argentina
- Date of death: 5 April 2013 (aged 79)
- Position: Goalkeeper

Senior career*
Years	Team	Apps	(Gls)
1955	Colegiales		
1956-1963	Racing Club		
1969-1970	Valencia FC		

International career
1959	Argentina	10	(0)
Medal record
Representing Argentina
Copa América
Winner	1959 Argentina
- * Club domestic league appearances and goals

Jorge Negri (3 June 1933 – 5 April 2013) was an Argentine footballer. He played in ten matches for the Argentina national football team in 1959. He was part of Argentina's squads for the two 1959 South American Championship, in Argentina and in Ecuador, winning the first one on home soil. Negri died on 5 April 2013, at the age of 79.
