= Negris =

Negris is a surname. Notable people with the surname include:

- Alexander Negris (1805–1860/80), Greek military colonel, author and professor
- Dimitrios Negris (born 1998), Greek swimmer
- Konstantinos Negris (1804–1880), Greek writer and mathematician
- Theodoros Negris (1790–1824), Greek politician

== See also ==
- Negri (surname)
