= Carlos Vásquez (Chilean footballer) =

Chilean footballer (born 1950)

Personal information
- Full name: Carlos Honorindo Vásquez Palma
- Date of birth: 20 June 1950 (age 76)
- Place of birth: Valparaíso, Chile
- Position: Right winger

Youth career
- Unión Edwards

Senior career*
Years	Team	Apps	(Gls)
1968	Everton	3	(0)
1970	San Antonio Unido		
1971–1973	Santiago Wanderers	56	(11)
1973	Naval	3	(0)
1974	Everton		
1975	Deportes Ovalle		
1977	Jorge Wilstermann		
- Ayacucho Festaco
1984	Iván Mayo		
- * Club domestic league appearances and goals

Carlos Honorindo Vásquez Palma (born 20 June 1950) is a Chilean former football player who played as a right winger. Besides Chile, he played in Bolivia.

== Playing career ==
Born in Valparaíso, Chile, Vásquez was with his hometown's club Unión Edwards before making his professional debut with Everton de Viña del Mar in the 1968 season.

In 1970, he switched to San Antonio Unido, winning the Copa Isidro Corbinos and becoming the top goalscorer with nine goals alongside his teammate Juan Soto.

In the Chilean top division, he also played for Santiago Wanderers (1971–73) and Naval (1973).

In the second level, he played for Everton (1974), Deportes Ovalle (1975) and Iván Mayo (1984). As a member of Everton, he got promotion to the top division.

Abroad, he played for Bolivian club Jorge Wilstermann in 1977, coinciding with his compatriot Juan Miguel Amaya and Víctor Villalón, and Ayacucho Festaco.

== Personal life ==
As a football player, he was nicknamed Burro (Donkey).

His older brother, Nelson, was a Chile international in the 1970s and they coincided in Unión Edwards at youth level and Everton in 1968.

He made his home in La Serena and his grandnephew of the same name, Carlos, grandson of Nelson, is a striker from the Deportes La Serena youth system.
