= Juan Soto (footballer, born 1937) =

Chilean footballer (1937–2014)

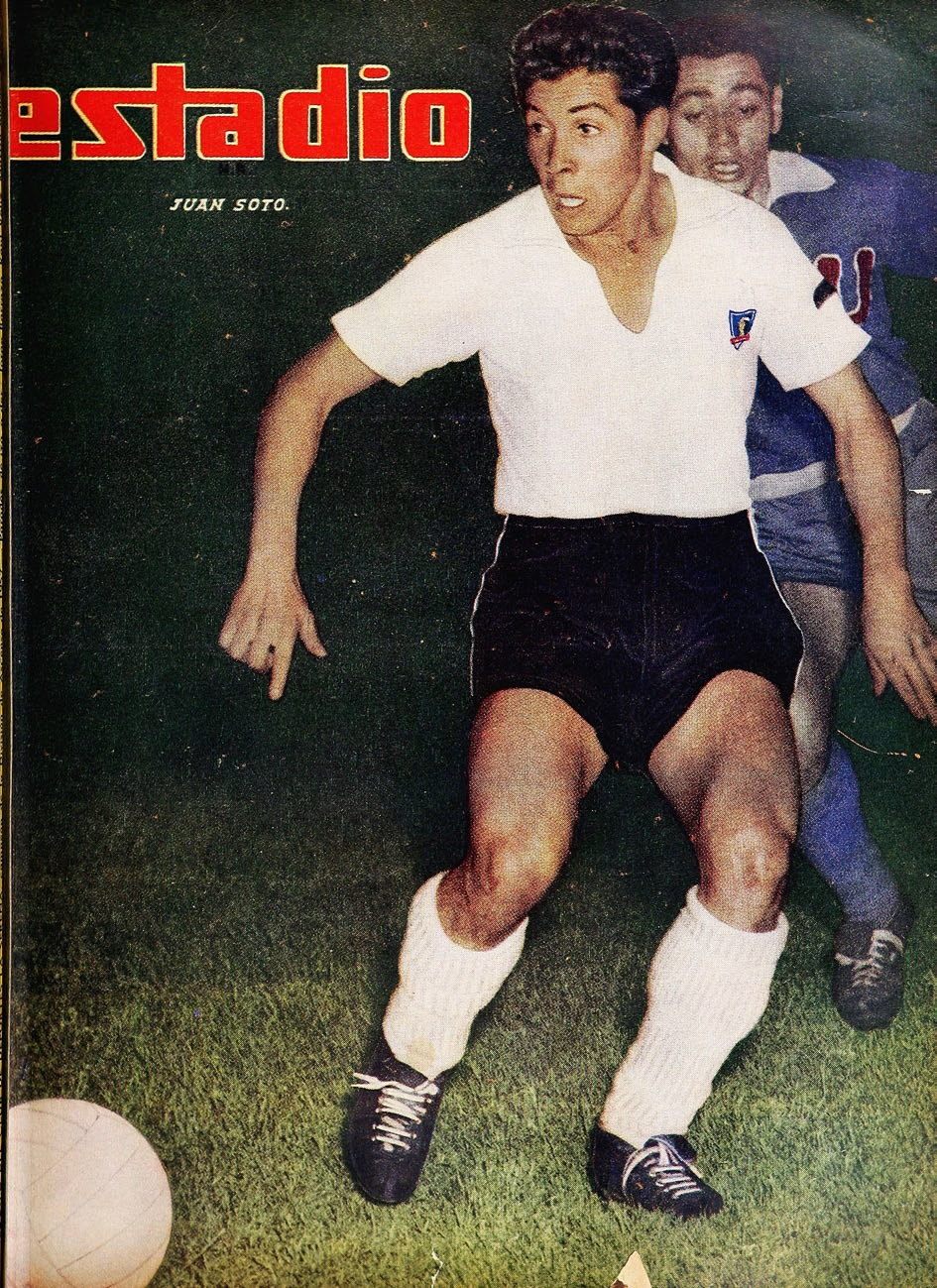
- Soto Mura in 1958

Personal information
- Full name: Juan Rodolfo Soto Mura
- Date of birth: 27 April 1937
- Place of birth: Santiago, Chile
- Date of death: 11 December 2014 (aged 77)
- Place of death: Punta Arenas, Chile
- Height: 1.71 m (5 ft 7 in)
- Position: Forward

Senior career*
Years	Team	Apps	(Gls)
1957–1962	Colo-Colo		(86)
1963–1967	Rangers		(81)
1968	Audax Italiano	16	(2)
1969	Colo-Colo		(2)
1970	San Antonio Unido		

International career
1957–1961	Chile	17	(6)

Managerial career
- 1981: Deportes La Serena
- 1982: Puerto Montt (city team)
- 1983: Provincial Osorno
- 1985: Chile U20
- * Club domestic league appearances and goals

Juan Rodolfo Soto Mura (27 April 1937 – 11 December 2014) was a Chilean football player and manager who played as a forward.

== Club career ==
On 18 May 1957, Soto made his professional debut playing for Colo-Colo in a match versus Magallanes. At the match, he scored a goal and was nicknamed El Niño Gol (The Goal Child). In 1963 he moved to Rangers de Talca, becoming the Top Goalscorer of the club history after scoring 81 goals until 1967. In 1968, he played for Audax Italiano, making 16 appearances with 2 goals. He returned to Colo-Colo in 1969, making 118 appearances and scoring 88 goals adding both steps at the club. He ended his career playing for San Antonio Unido in the Segunda División, winning the Copa Isidro Corbinos as the top goalscorer with nine goals alongside his teammate Carlos Vásquez.

== International career ==
Soto played in 19 matches for the Chile national team from 1957 to 1961, including non A-Class matches. He was also part of Chile's squad for the 1959 South American Championship that took place in Argentina.

== Coaching career ==
Soto coached Deportes La Serena in the Primera División and Provincial Osorno in the Segunda División in 1981 and 1983, respectively. In addition, he coached a team of Puerto Montt city in the 1982 Campeonato Nacional Amateur (National Amateur Championship) and Chile U20 in the 1985 South American Championship.

Later, he made his home in Punta Arenas and coached amateur clubs such as Club Deportivo Salfa, CD Sokol Croata and Club Social y Deportivo Prat.

== Honours ==
Colo-Colo

- Chilean Primera División: 1960
- Copa Chile: 1958

San Antonio Unido

- Copa Isidro Corbinos: 1970

Individual

- Copa Chile top goalscorer: 1959
- Chilean Footballer of the Year: 1960
- Copa Isidro Corbinos top goalscorer: 1970
