= Víctor Guaglianone =

Uruguayan footballer (1936–2026)

Personal information
- Full name: Víctor Homero Guaglianone Sosa
- Date of birth: 24 September 1936
- Date of death: 21 June 2026 (aged 89)
- Position: Forward

International career
| Years | Team | Apps | (Gls) |
| 1959–1960 | Uruguay | 8 | (4) |
Medal record
Representing Uruguay
South American Championship
| Winner | 1959 Ecuador |

Víctor Homero Guaglianone Sosa (24 September 1936 – 21 June 2026) was a Uruguayan footballer. He played in eight matches for the Uruguay national team from 1959 to 1960. He was also part of Uruguay's squad for the 1959 South American Championship that took place in Argentina.

Guaglione died on 21 June 2026, at the age of 89.

== Career statistics ==
=== International ===
Appearances and goals by national team and year
| National team | Year | Apps | Goals |
|---|---|---|---|
| Uruguay | 1959 | 4 | 1 |
| Uruguay | 1960 | 4 | 3 |
| Total | | 8 | 4 |

Scores and results list Uruguay's goal tally first, score column indicates score after each Guaglianone goal.

List of international goals scored by Víctor Guaglianone
| No. | Date | Venue | Opponent | Score | Result | Competition |
|---|---|---|---|---|---|---|
| 1 | 8 March 1959 | Estadio Monumental de Nuñez, Buenos Aires, Argentina | Bolivia | 3–0 | 7–0 | 1959 South American Championship (Argentina) |
| 2 | 1 June 1960 | Estadio Nacional, Santiago, Chile | Chile | 2–1 | 3–2 | Friendly |
| 3 | 5 June 1960 | Estadio Centenario, Montevideo, Uruguay | Chile | 1–1 | 2–2 | Friendly |
| 4 | 5 June 1960 | Estadio Centenario, Montevideo, Uruguay | Chile | 2–1 | 2–2 | Friendly |

== Honours ==
Uruguay

- South American Championship: 1959
