= Néstor Cardoso =

Argentine footballer

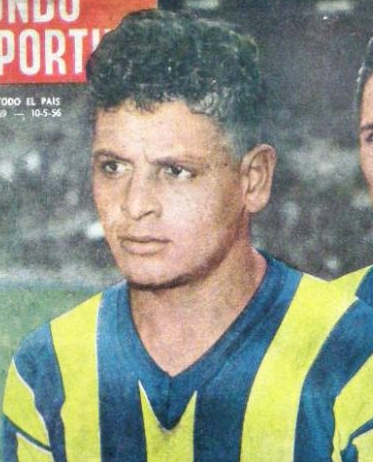

Personal information
- Date of birth: 17 November 1935 (age 90)
- Place of birth: Rosario, Argentina

International career
Years	Team	Apps	(Gls)
1960–1963	Argentina	7	(0)

Néstor Cardoso (born 17 November 1935) is an Argentine footballer. He played in seven matches for the Argentina national football team from 1960 to 1963. He was also part of Argentina's squad for the 1959 South American Championship that took place in Argentina.
