= José Aveiro =

Paraguayan footballer (1936–2024)

Personal information
- Full name: José Raúl Aveiro Lamas
- Date of birth: 18 July 1936
- Place of birth: Asunción, Paraguay
- Date of death: 19 October 2024 (aged 88)
- Height: 1.77 m (5 ft 10 in)
- Position: Striker

Senior career*
Years	Team	Apps	(Gls)
1958	Sportivo Luqueño		
1959–1962	Valencia	32	(15)
1961–1963	Valencia Mestalla	22	(6)
1963–1964	Elche	15	(1)
1964–1965	Ontinyent	28	(1)
1965–1966	Constància	24	(0)
Total		121	(23)

International career
1957–1959	Paraguay	12	(7)
- * Club domestic league appearances and goals

José Raúl Aveiro Lamas (18 July 1936 – 19 October 2024) was a Paraguayan professional footballer who played as a striker. He was in Paraguay's squad for the 1958 FIFA World Cup.

== Club career ==
Born in Asunción, Aveiro played for Sportivo Luqueño, Valencia, Valencia Mestalla, Elche, Ontinyent and Constància.

== International career ==
Aveiro earned his first cap for Paraguay during a friendly game against Bolivia on 12 June 1957.

He scored his first international goal on 20 April 1958 during a friendly game against Argentina.

He was included in the Paraguay squad for the 1958 FIFA World Cup, but did not make any appearances.

Aveiro was also in Paraguay's squad for the 1959 Copa America in Argentina, playing six games and scoring six times. During the last game against Peru on 2 April 1959 he earned his twelfth and last cap, and scored his seventh and last goal, for the national team.

== Death ==
Aveiro died on 19 October 2024, at the age of 88.
