= Omar García (footballer, born 1939) =

Argentine footballer (born 1939)

Omar Higinio García
Personal information
- Date of birth: 11 September 1939 (age 87)
- Place of birth: Guaminí, Argentina
- Height: 1.73 m (5 ft 8 in)
- Position: Forward

Senior career*
Years	Team	Apps	(Gls)
1957–1958	Tigre		
1959–1962	San Lorenzo		
1963	Chacarita Juniors		

International career
1959	Argentina	3	(1)
- * Club domestic league appearances and goals

Omar Higinio García (born 11 September 1939) is an Argentine former footballer who played as a forward. He made three appearances for the Argentina national team in 1959. He was also part of Argentina's squad for the 1959 South American Championship that took place in Ecuador.
