= José Balseca =

Ecuadorian footballer (1933–2019)

Personal information
- Full name: José Vicente Balseca Bahamonde
- Date of birth: 19 August 1933
- Place of birth: Guayaquil, Ecuador
- Date of death: 15 September 2019 (aged 86)
- Place of death: New York City, New York, U.S.

Senior career*
Years	Team	Apps	(Gls)
1951-1966	Emelec		

International career
1963	Ecuador	24	(2)
- * Club domestic league appearances and goals

José Balseca (19 August 1933 – 15 September 2019) was an Ecuadorian footballer. He played in five editions of the Copa America: 1953, 1955, 1957, 1959(Ecuador) and 1963. Balseca died on 15 September 2019, at the age of 86.
