= Silvio Parodi =

Italian general

- Born: 16 February 1878; Genoa, Kingdom of Italy
- Died: 19 June 1944 (aged 66); Savignone, Italian Social Republic
- Military career
- Allegiance: Kingdom of Italy; Italian Social Republic
- Branch: Royal Italian Army; MVSN; Guardia Nazionale Repubblicana
- Rank: Major General
- Commands: XIII Assault Unit
- Conflicts: World War I; Pacification of Libya
- Awards: Bronze Medal of Military Valor (twice)

Silvio Parodi (16 February 1878 – 19 June 1944) was an Italian Fascist politician and soldier.

== Biography ==
Born into a middle-class family, he attended the Military Academy of Modena and graduated as a infantry second lieutenant. He was later discharged from active service, but was recalled with the rank of lieutenant during the First World War, joining the Arditi in 1917. In 1918, after promotion to major, he took command of the 2nd Battalion of the 35th Infantry Regiment of the "Pistoia" Infantry Brigade, which he held until the end of the war, earning a bronze medal for military valor. In 1919 he was sent to Libya at the head of the XIII Assault Unit, participating in counterguerrilla operations against the Senussi rebels, for which he was awarded another bronze medal for valor.

He then joined the Fascist movement and directed the Genoese "action squads" from 1920 to 1922; in October 1922, as the March on Rome took place, he commanded the assault of the squadristi on the Prefecture of Genoa, defended by cordons of sailors and policemen. After the establishment of the Fascist regime, he became a member of the Federal Directory of the National Fascist Party of Genoa, and was appointed Podestà of Savignone, his native town, a post he held for twelve years. He also joined the Volunteer Militia for National Security, with the rank of console generale (brigadier general). From 1926 he became president of the orphanage of San Giovanni Battista, one of the oldest charitable institutions in Genoa, building summer colonies in Crocefieschi and Savignone and organizing Arabic language courses after the war in Ethiopia. During World War II he was appointed civil commissioner of Trogir, in the Governatorate of Dalmatia, from 1941 to 1943.

After the armistice of Cassibile he joined the Italian Social Republic, becoming a major general in the Republican National Guard and serving as president of the Extraordinary Provincial Tribunal of Turin in early 1944. On 16 March 1944 he was appointed extraordinary commissioner for Genoa, replacing podestà Aldo Gardini and acting as de facto mayor of the city. Among other things, during his mandate he supervised the replacement of street names related to members of the House of Savoy. In the spring of 1944, the situation in Genoa in its hinterland was extremely tense, with repeated strikes, air raids, partisan attacks and reprisals; in June the food situation in the Ligurian capital had become disastrous, with the daily ration of bread being reduced to 150 grams. Parodi, along with prefect Carlo Emanuele Basile and other local authorities, made an arrangement with a local importer, Angelo Navone, avoiding a famine in the city.

On 16 June 1944 Parodi was ambushed near Palazzo Tursi by some GAP members, but survived unscathed when the gun of the attacker tasked with killing him jammed. He refused an armed escort, and three days later the attack was repeated as Parodi was leaving his sister's house in Savignone; this time he was killed. Balilla Grillotti, the commander of the GAP of Genoa who had participated in the ambush (according to some accounts, he was Parodi's killer), was captured and executed the following month. The 31st Black Brigade of Genoa was later named after Parodi.
