= Paulo Carvoeiro =

Brazilian footballer

Personal information
- Date of birth: 1 November 1930
- Place of birth: São Paulo, Brazil
- Date of death: 19 April 1980 (aged 49)
- Place of death: São Paulo, Brazil
- Position: Forward

International career
Years	Team	Apps	(Gls)
1959	Brazil	4	(3)

Paulo Pisaneschi (1 November 1930 – 19 April 1980), also known as Paulo Carvoeiro, was a Brazilian footballer. He played in four matches for the Brazil national football team in 1959, scoring three goals. He was also part of Brazil's squad for the 1959 South American Championship that took place in Ecuador.
