= Juan Carlos Leiva =

Uruguayan footballer (1933–2021)

Personal information
- Date of birth: 22 May 1933
- Date of death: 3 April 2021 (aged 87)
- Position: Goalkeeper

International career
Years	Team	Apps	(Gls)
1959	Uruguay	2	(0)

Juan Carlos Leiva (22 May 1933 – 3 April 2021) was an Uruguayan footballer. He played in two matches for the Uruguay national football team in 1959. He was also part of Uruguay's squad for the 1959 South American Championship that took place in Argentina.

Leiva died on 3 April 2021, at the age of 87.
