= Zé de Mello =

Brazilian footballer

Personal information
- Full name: José Inácio de Mello
- Date of birth: 7 January 1934 (age 92)
- Place of birth: Juazeiro do Norte, Brazil
- Position: Attacking midfielder

International career
Years	Team	Apps	(Gls)
1959	Brazil	5	(2)

José Inácio de Mello (born 7 January 1934), known as Zé de Mello, is a Brazilian footballer who played as an attacking midfielder. He made five appearances for the Brazil national team in 1959. He was also part of Brazil's squad for the 1959 South American Championship that took place in Ecuador.
