= Mario Soto (footballer, born 1933) =

Chilean footballer

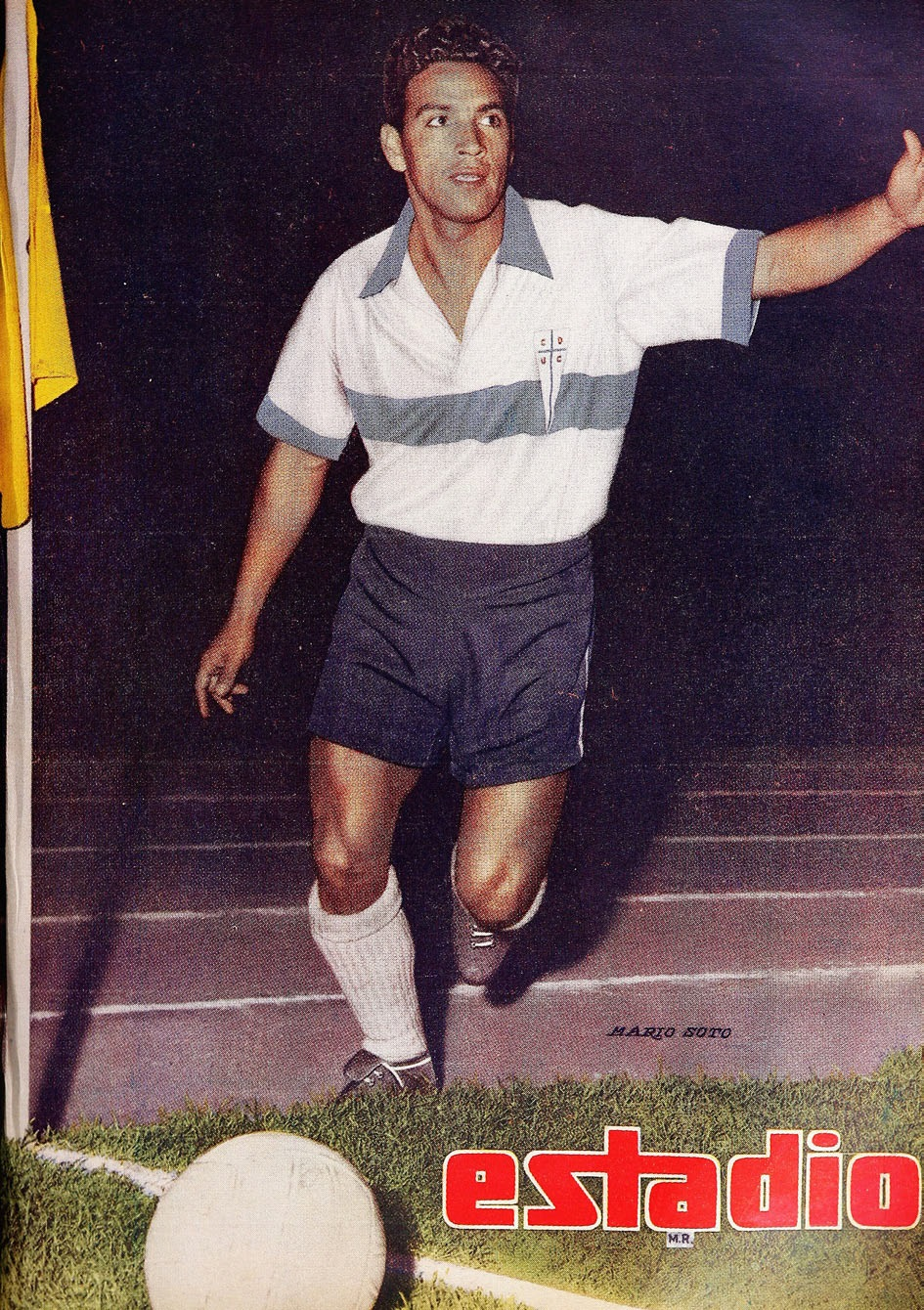
- Soto in 1958

Personal information
- Full name: Mario José Soto Soto
- Date of birth: 16 July 1933
- Date of death: 28 September 1998 (aged 65)
- Position: Forward

Senior career*
Years	Team	Apps	(Gls)
- Universidad Católica

International career
1959–1960	Chile	10	(2)
- * Club domestic league appearances and goals

Mario José Soto Soto (16 July 1933 – 28 September 1998) was a Chilean footballer. He played in ten matches for the Chile national football team in 1959 and 1960. He was also part of Chile's squad for the 1959 South American Championship that took place in Argentina.
