= Juan Rojas (footballer, born 1935) =

Chilean footballer (born 1935)

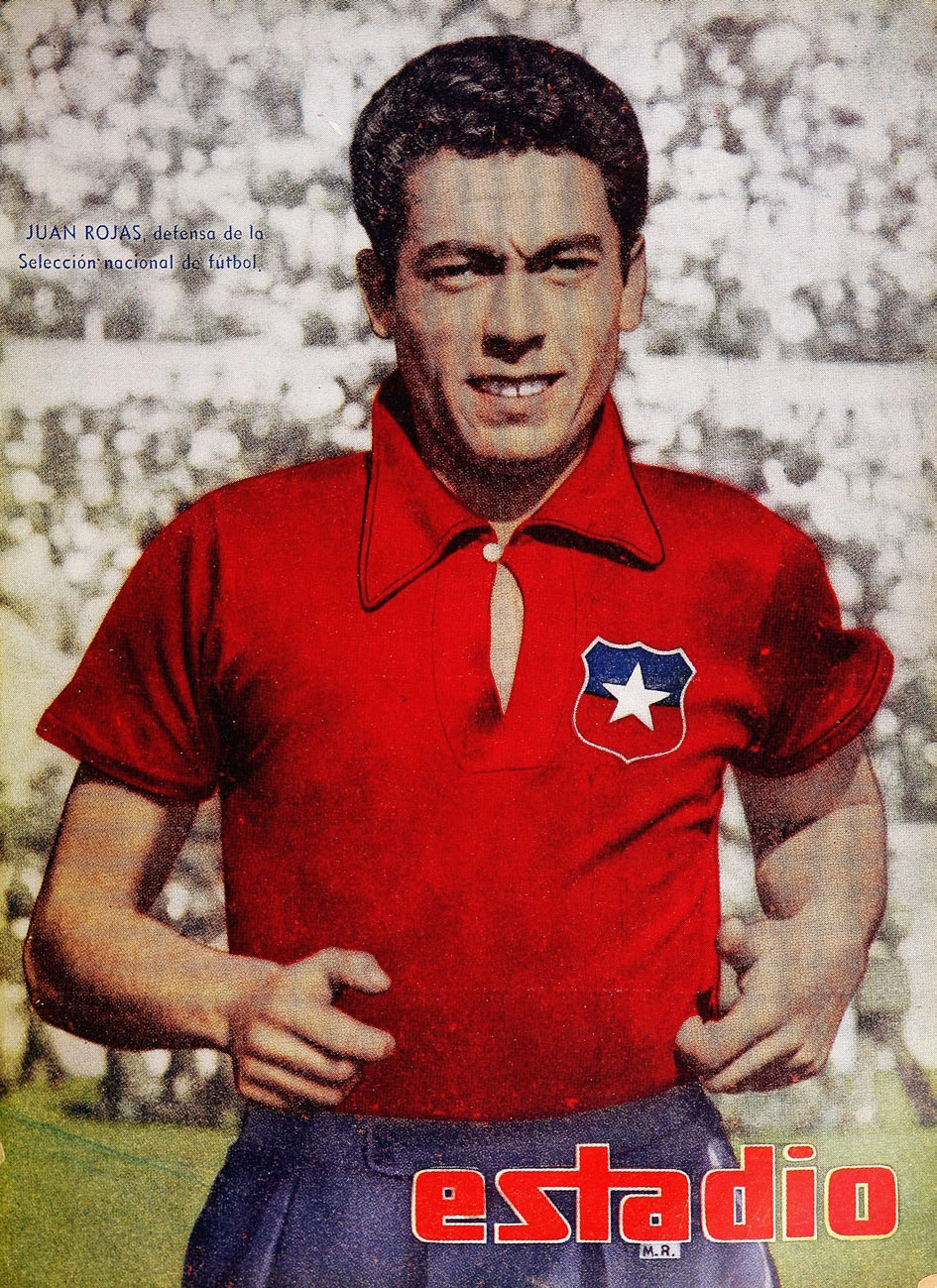

Personal information
- Full name: Juan Héctor Rojas Lobos
- Date of birth: 11 June 1935 (age 91)
- Place of birth: Santiago, Chile
- Height: 1.80 m (5 ft 11 in)
- Position: Midfielder

Youth career
- Deportivo Colombia
- 1951–1952: Audax Italiano
- 1953–1954: Magallanes

Senior career*
Years	Team	Apps	(Gls)
1954–1957	Magallanes		
1955	→ Deportivo Fanaloza (loan)		
1958–1963	Deportes La Serena		
1964	O'Higgins		
1965	Deportivo Cali		

International career
1957–1959	Chile	5	(0)
- * Club domestic league appearances and goals

Juan Héctor Rojas Lobos (born 11 June 1935) is a Chilean footballer.

== Club career ==
As a youth player, Rojas was with Deportivo Colombia and Audax Italiano, before joining Magallanes youth ranks. After a stint on loan at Deportivo Fanaloza, he made his debut with Magallanes in 1956 against San Luis de Quillota. Next, he played for Deportes La Serena (1958–1963), O'Higgins (1964) and Deportivo Cali (1965).

== International career ==
He played in five matches for the Chile national football team from 1957 to 1959. He was also part of Chile's squad for the 1959 South American Championship that took place in Argentina.

== Honours ==
Deportivo Fanaloza

- Liga Penquista Top Goalscorer: 1955

Deportes La Serena

- Copa Preparación: 1960

O'Higgins

- Segunda División de Chile: 1964
