= Francesco Negri =

Francesco Negri may refer to:

- Francesco Negri (Antitrinitarian) (1500–1563), Italian ex-Benedictine monk in Poland
- Francesco Negri (travel writer) (1623–1698), Italian priest traveller in Scandinavia
- Francesco Negri (photographer) (1841–1924), mayor of Casale Monferrato and lawyer
- Francesco Negri (composer), 17th-century Italian composer
