= Geraldo José =

Brazilian footballer (1936-2013)

Personal information
- Full name: Geraldo José da Silva
- Date of birth: 6 March 1936
- Place of birth: Recife, Brazil
- Date of death: 21 April 2013 (aged 77)

Senior career*
Years	Team	Apps	(Gls)
1955–1960	Náutico		
1961–1962	Palmeiras		
1963	Flamengo		
1964	Náutico		
1965	Corinthians		
1966	Sport Recife		
1966	Ponte Preta		
1967	São Bento		
1970	Campinense		
1971	América-PE		

International career
1959	Brazil	5	(2)
- * Club domestic league appearances and goals

Geraldo José da Silva (6 March 1936 – 21 April 2013) was a Brazilian footballer. He played in five matches for the Brazil national football team in 1959. He was also part of Brazil's squad for the 1959 South American Championship that took place in Ecuador.
