= José Barreiro (footballer) =

Argentine football player and coach (born 1920)

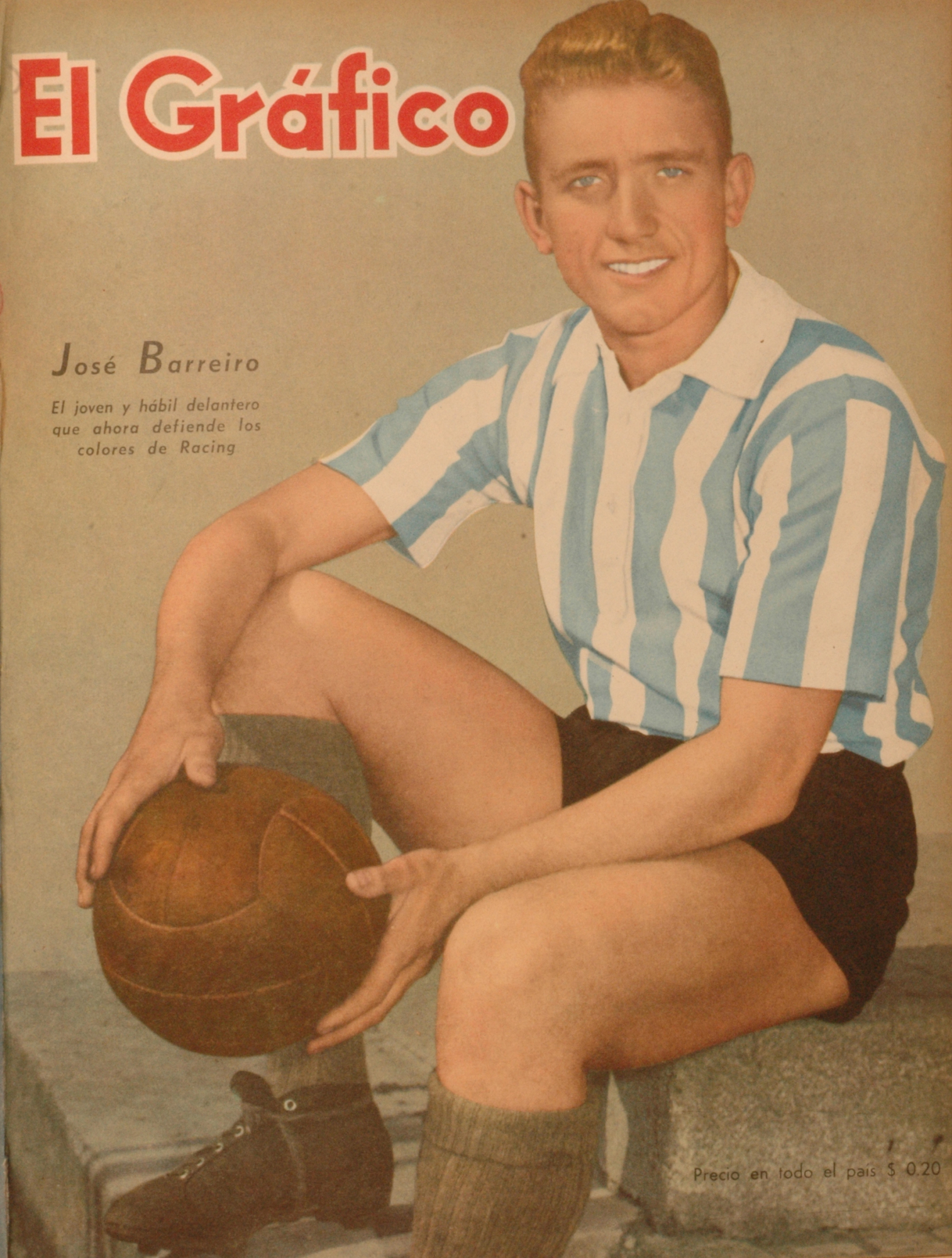
- Portrait of Barreiro in 1944

Personal information
- Full name: José Maria Barreiro
- Date of birth: 16 March 1920
- Place of birth: Buenos Aires, Argentina

Senior career*
Years	Team	Apps	(Gls)
1941–1943	Chacarita Juniors	126	(29)
1944–1945	Racing Club	42	(11)
1946–1947	Chacarita Juniors	(see above)	
1948–1952	Estudiantes	120	(35)
1953–1956	Chacarita Juniors	(see above)	
- * Club domestic league appearances and goals

José Barreiro (born 16 March 1920) is an Argentine former football player and coach.

== Career ==
Barreiro started his career in 1941 with Chacarita Juniors in the Primera B. After one season they were promoted to the top flight. In 1944–1945 he transferred to Racing Club but returned to Chacarita in 1946. After two seasons he went on to play for Estudiantes. In 1951 he scored two goals in the legendary 7–0 victory against CA Vélez Sarsfield. He ended his career where it started, with Chacarita.

In 1957 Barreiro became manager for San Lorenzo de Almagro and became champion with the team in 1959. Together with Victorio Spinetto and José Della Torre he led the national team in 1959 to the victory of the Copa América. In 1960, he reached the semifinals of the Copa Libertadores. After this he left San Lorenzo, but returned to the club in 1963–1964, where he promoted a group of young players that became known as Los Carasuscias, and 1966–1967, leaving the foundation of the team that won the championship in 1968. He became a club icon.
