= Miguel Ángel Loayza =

Peruvian footballer (1940-2017)

Miguel Loayza
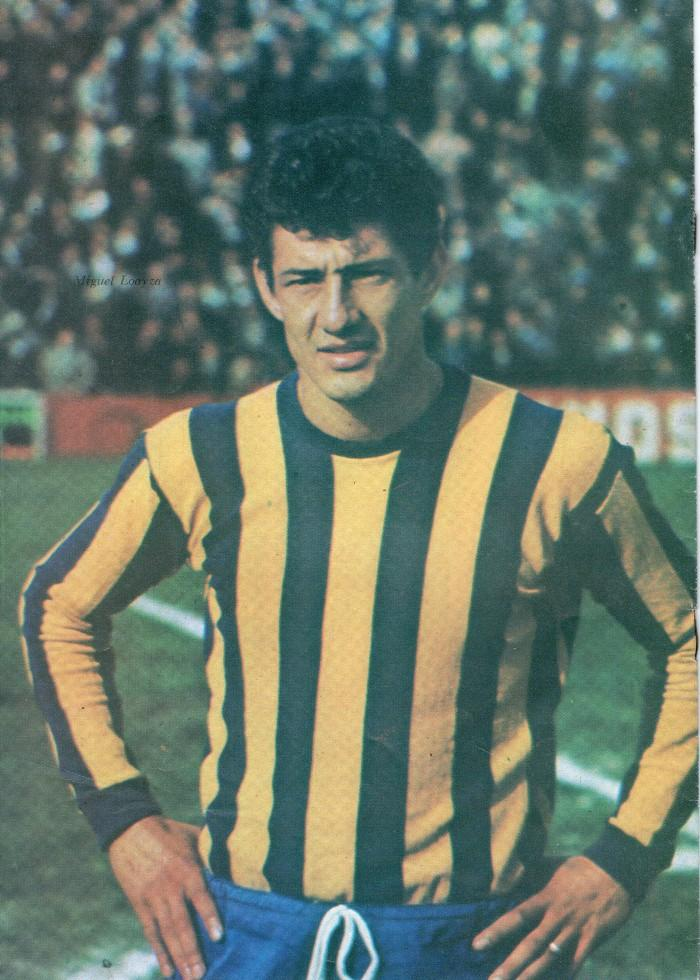

Personal information
- Full name: Miguel Ángel Loayza Ríos
- Date of birth: 21 June 1940
- Place of birth: Loreto, Peru
- Date of death: 19 October 2017 (aged 77)
- Place of death: Buenos Aires, Argentina
- Height: 1.70 m (5 ft 7 in)
- Position: Midfielder

Senior career*
Years	Team	Apps	(Gls)
1957–1959	Ciclista Lima		
1959–1960	FC Barcelona	2	(2)
1961–1963	Boca Juniors	21	(7)
1964	Rosario Central	18	(5)
1965	Huracán	29	(6)
1966	River Plate	31	(17)
1967–1968	Huracán	46	(25)
1969–1971	Deportivo Cali	79	(38)

International career
1959	Peru	7	(5)
- * Club domestic league appearances and goals

Miguel Ángel Loayza Ríos (21 June 1940 – 19 October 2017) was a football midfielder from Peru. He played for several clubs, notably Argentine clubs Huracán, Boca Juniors and River Plate as well as Colombian club Deportivo Cali. He was famous for his short passing, creativity and excellent dribbling ability, nicknamed "El Maestrito" ("The little Master") in Argentina and "El Mago" ("The magician") in Colombia.

== Playing career ==
Born in Loreto, he made his debut for Ciclista Lima in June 1957 and quickly demonstrated his talent. He participated with Peru in the Copa América 1959 making a strong performance with 5 goals in 6 matches. On May 17, 1959 Loayza was part of the Peru national team which demolished to England 4-1 in Lima.

After a successful career in Peru he left his homeland at 19 years of age, to play for Spanish club FC Barcelona, he would not return to play in Peru. He was not able to adapt to European football and Loayza moved on to Argentina to play with Boca Juniors, where he played 3 seasons. He won an Argentine League in 1962.

Loayza also played for a number of other clubs in Argentina including Club Atlético Huracán, Rosario Central and Boca Juniors fiercest rivals River Plate.

In 1969, he joined Deportivo Cali where he was part of the team that won 2 Mustang Cup (1969, 1970) and remains one of their most iconic players. He died on 19 October 2017 in Buenos Aires at the age of 77.

== Honors ==
Season	Club	Title
1960	FC Barcelona	Spanish League
1960	FC Barcelona	Inter-Cities Fairs Cup
1962	Boca Juniors	Primera Division Argentina
1969	Deportivo Cali	Colombian Championship
1970	Deportivo Cali	Colombian Championship
