= Juan Rojas (footballer, born 1957) =

Chilean footballer

Personal information
- Full name: Juan Daniel Rojas Carvacho
- Date of birth: 7 August 1957 (age 69)
- Place of birth: Chile
- Height: 1.81 m (5 ft 11 in)
- Position: Forward

Senior career*
Years	Team	Apps	(Gls)
1975–1976	Aviación	1	(0)
1977–1978	Independiente Cauquenes		
1979	Coquimbo Unido		
1980	Malleco Unido		
1981–1982	Magallanes	60	(16)
1983–1985	Colo-Colo	78	(19)
1986–1988	Unión Española	58	(20)
1988–1989	Atlético Potosino		
1989	Palestino		(3)

International career
1983	Chile	12	(0)
- * Club domestic league appearances and goals

Juan Daniel Rojas Carvacho (born 7 August 1957) is a Chilean former professional footballer who played as a forward for clubs in Chile and Mexico.

== Club career ==
With an extensive career in his homeland, he made his debut in Aviación in 1975.

In the second level, he played for Independiente de Cauquenes and Malleco Unido.

In the Chilean Primera División, he also played for Coquimbo Unido, Magallanes, Colo-Colo and Unión Española.

Abroad, he played for the Mexican club Atlético Potosino in the 1988–89 season, coinciding with his compatriot Luis Castro.

His last club was Palestino in 1989 in the second level, taking part in the final match against Universidad de Chile.

== International career ==
Rojas made twelve appearances for the Chile national team in 1983, including two appearances in the 1983 Copa América.

== Personal life ==
Rojas was nicknamed El Rápido (The Fast One).

== Honours ==
Colo-Colo

- Chilean Primera División: 1983
- Copa Polla Gol: 1985

Chile

- Copa del Pacífico: 1983
