= 1959 South American Championship (Ecuador) =

Tournament details
- Host country: Ecuador
- Dates: 5–25 December
- Teams: 5 (from 1 confederation)
- Venue: 1 (in 1 host city)

Final positions
- Champions: Uruguay (10th title)
- Runners-up: Argentina
- Third place: Brazil
- Fourth place: Ecuador

Tournament statistics
- Matches played: 10
- Goals scored: 40 (4 per match)
- Top scorer(s): (Argentina) José Sanfilippo (6 goals)

The 1959 South American Championship held in Ecuador was an extra South American Championship for the year. The tournament was contested between five teams; Bolivia, Chile, Colombia, and Peru did not participate, whilst Brazil attended with a team from Pernambuco. Uruguay won their 10th South American title.

== Format ==
The format was the same as other tournaments; it was a round-robin tournament, awarding two points for a win, one for a draw, and nothing for a defeat. The team with the most points at the end was declared the tournament winner.

== Venues ==
Guayaquil
Estadio Modelo
Capacity: 42,000
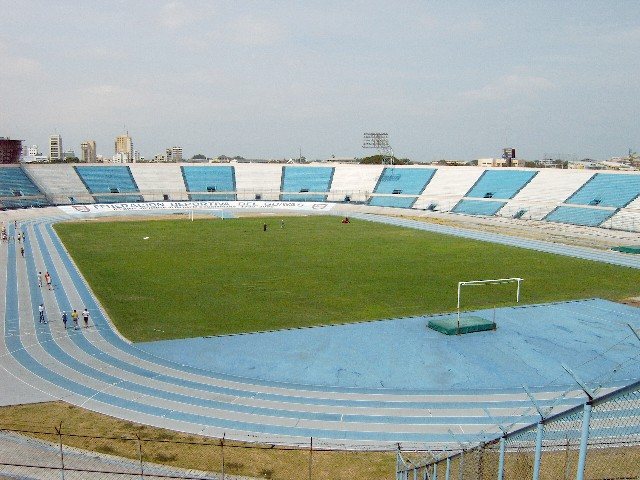

== Standings ==
Team	Pld	W	D	L	GF	GA	GD	Pts
Uruguay	4	3	1	0	13	1	+12	7
Argentina	4	2	1	1	9	9	0	5
Brazil	4	2	0	2	7	10	−3	4
Ecuador	4	1	1	2	5	9	−4	3
Paraguay	4	0	1	3	6	11	−5	1

== Matches ==
5 December 1959

Brazil	3–2	Paraguay
Paulo 25', 39', 55'		Parodi 72', 90'

Estadio Modelo, Guayaquil
Attendance: 35,000
Referee: Carlos Ceballos (Ecuador)

6 December 1959

Uruguay	4–0	Ecuador
Silveira 1' (pen.); Escalada 28'; Bergara 46'; Pérez 52'

Estadio Modelo, Guayaquil
Attendance: 55,000
Referee: José Luis Praddaude (Argentina)

9 December 1959

Argentina	4–2	Paraguay
Sanfilippo 8', 57', 89' (pen.); Pizzuti 81'		Insfrán 30'; Cabral 90'

Estadio Modelo, Guayaquil
Attendance: 15,000
Referee: Esteban Marino (Uruguay)

12 December 1959

Uruguay	3–0	Brazil
Escalada 49'; Bergara 67'; Sasía 75'

Estadio Modelo, Guayaquil
Attendance: 55,000
Referee: José Luis Praddaude (Argentina)

12 December 1959

Ecuador	1–1	Argentina
Raffo 20'		Sosa 62'

Estadio Modelo, Guayaquil
Attendance: 55,000
Referee: José Gomes Sobrinho (Brazil)

16 December 1959

Uruguay	5–0	Argentina
Silveira 9' (pen.), 55' (pen.); Bergara 15', 64'; Sasía 25'

Estadio Modelo, Guayaquil
Attendance: 50,000
Referee: José Gomes Sobrinho (Brazil)

19 December 1959

Brazil	3–1	Ecuador
Paulo 23'; Geraldo 42'; Zé de Mello 45'		Raffo 12'

Estadio Modelo, Guayaquil
Attendance: 55,000
Referee: Esteban Marino (Uruguay)

22 December 1959

Argentina	4–1	Brazil
García 2'; Sanfilippo 27', 89', 90'		Geraldo 64'

Estadio Modelo, Guayaquil
Attendance: 42,000
Referee: Esteban Marino (Uruguay)

22 December 1959

Paraguay	1–1	Uruguay
Parodi 32'		Sasía 88'

Estadio Modelo, Guayaquil
Attendance: 45,000
Referee: José Luis Praddaude (Argentina)

25 December 1959

Ecuador	3–1	Paraguay
Spencer 16'; Balseca 25'; Cañarte 74'		Gómez 5' (o.g.)

Estadio Modelo, Guayaquil
Attendance: 55,000
Referee: José Gomes Sobrinho (Brazil)

== Goalscorers ==
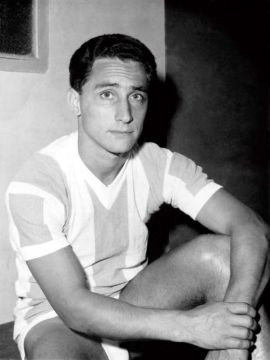
José Sanfilippo, top scorer

With six goals, José Sanfilippo of Argentina is the top scorer in the tournament. In total, 40 goals were scored by 21 different players, with only one of them credited as own goal.

6 goals

- (Argentina) José Sanfilippo

4 goals

- (Uruguay) Mario Ludovico Bergara
- (Brazil) Paulo Pisaneschi

3 goals

- (Paraguay) Silvio Parodi
- (Uruguay) Alcides Silveira
- (Uruguay) José Sasía

2 goals

- (Brazil) Geraldo José da Silva
- (Ecuador) Carlos Alberto Raffo
- (Uruguay) Guillermo Escalada

1 goal

- (Argentina) Juan José Pizzuti
- (Argentina) Omar Higinio García
- (Argentina) Rubén Héctor Sosa
- (Brazil) Zé de Mello
- (Ecuador) Alberto Spencer
- (Ecuador) Climaco Cañarte
- (Ecuador) José Vicente Balseca
- (Paraguay) Eligio Antonio Insfrán
- (Paraguay) Pedro Antonio Cabral
- (Uruguay) Domingo Pérez

Own goal

- (Ecuador) Rómulo Gómez (playing against Paraguay)

== Controversy ==
Originally, the 1959 Copa America was scheduled to be hosted by Ecuador. However, due to financial difficulties and infrastructure challenges, Ecuador withdrew as the host nation just a few months before the tournament was set to begin. This sudden withdrawal left CONMEBOL in a difficult situation to find a replacement host at such short notice.

In response to Ecuador's withdrawal, Argentina volunteered to step in as the new host for the tournament. The Argentine Football Association (AFA) had the necessary resources and infrastructure to organize the event. Consequently, Argentina was granted the hosting rights, and the tournament was scheduled to take place in Buenos Aires.

However, a disagreement arose among some South American nations regarding the legitimacy of Argentina being granted the hosting rights without a proper bidding process. A group of countries, including Brazil, Uruguay, and Chile, refused to participate in the tournament hosted by Argentina and organized their own competition called the "Copa del Atlántico", in response.

Meanwhile, Argentina went ahead with its plans and organized the Copa America as scheduled, inviting other CONMEBOL member nations to participate. The tournament took place from March 7 to April 4, 1959, and was won by Argentina.

After Argentina's tournament concluded, the dissenting nations decided to organize their own Copa America tournament to run parallel to the one hosted by Argentina. This second tournament, known as the "Copa del Atlántico", took place in Brazil from May 30 to June 15, 1959, with Brazil as the winners.

The decision to hold a second Copa America in Ecuador was made to commemorate the 100th anniversary of the birth of Eloy Alfaro, a prominent Ecuadorian political figure. The tournament was officially named the "Copa del Centenario de la Batalla de Quito" (Centenary Cup of the Battle of Quito) to honor this occasion. Uruguay emerged as champions, securing their 10th title in the tournament's history.
