= César Sánchez (Bolivian footballer) =

Bolivian footballer (1935-2012)

Personal information
- Date of birth: 29 January 1935
- Date of death: 26 November 2012 (aged 77)

International career
Years	Team	Apps	(Gls)
1967	Bolivia	2	(0)

César Sánchez (29 January 1935 – 26 November 2012) was a Bolivian footballer. He played in two matches for the Bolivia national football team in 1967. He was also part of Bolivia's squad for the 1967 South American Championship.
