= Juan José Pizzuti =

Argentine footballer (1927–2020)

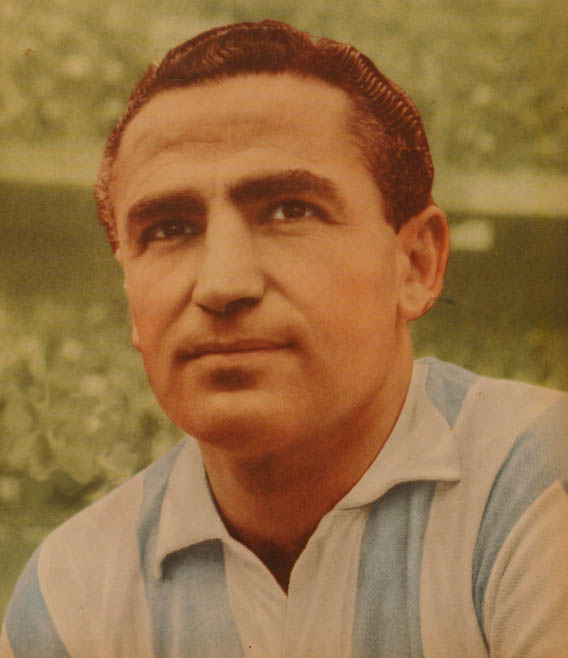
- Pizzuti with Racing Club in 1961

Personal information
- Full name: Juan José Pizzuti
- Date of birth: 9 May 1927
- Place of birth: Buenos Aires, Argentina
- Date of death: 24 January 2020 (aged 92)
- Place of death: Buenos Aires, Argentina
- Position: Striker

Youth career
- 1941–1947: Banfield

Senior career*
Years	Team	Apps	(Gls)
1947–1950	Banfield	77	(47)
1951	River Plate	30	(7)
1952–1954	Racing Club	213 (total)	(118)
1955	Boca Juniors	20	(9)
1956–1962	Racing Club	(see above)	
1962–1963	Boca Juniors	9	(2)
Total		349	(183)

International career
1951–1959	Argentina	12	(4)

Managerial career
- 1964–1965: Chacarita Juniors
- 1965–1969: Racing Club
- 1970–1972: Argentina
- 1973: Colón
- 1974: Racing Club
- 1975–1976: Independiente Medellín
- 1983: Racing Club
- 1993: Racing Club
- * Club domestic league appearances and goals

Juan José Pizzuti (9 May 1927 – 24 January 2020) was an Argentine football player and manager. A striker, he enjoyed his most notable successes as player and manager with Racing Club de Avellaneda.

Pizzuti was born in the Barracas neighbourhood of Buenos Aires and joined the Banfield youth team at the age of 14.

== Playing career ==
Pizzuti made his breakthrough into the Banfield first team in 1947 at the age of 19. He became the top scorer in the Argentine league in 1949, this brought him to the attention of several major clubs and he eventually signed for River Plate in 1951.

In 1952, after only one season with River, Pizzuti left to join Racing Club de Avellaneda, he became the topscorer in the Argentine league for a second time in 1953.

In 1955 Pizzuti joined Boca Juniors, making him one of a select band of players to have played for both River Plate and Boca Juniors, he only played 20 games that season and returned to Racing Club in 1956.

Pizzuti was part of a championship winning team for the first time in 1958, and Racing won the title again in 1961. Pizzuti then returned to Boca Juniors where he won his third and last league title as a player in 1962. He retired as a player in 1963, by the end of his career he had scored a total of 182 goals in 349 games, to make him one of the top 20 all time goalscorers in the Argentine league.

=== International career ===
Pizzuti played for Argentina between 1951 and 1959, he was part of the squad for the South American Championship in 1959 where he scored three goals to help them to win the title.

=== Titles as a player ===
Racing

- Primera División Argentina: 1958, 1961

Boca Juniors

- Primera División Argentina: 1962

Argentina

- Copa América: 1959

== Managerial career ==
Pizzuti took over as the manager of Racing Club in 1965, he led them to the Argentine league championship in 1966 and then saw his team defeat Nacional of Uruguay in the 1967 Copa Libertadores. Racing Club then added to their international success by defeating Celtic F.C. of Scotland to win the Copa Intercontinental and become the first Argentine team to become club champions of the world. Pizzuti left Racing Club in 1969 after four years and four months in charge, which still stands as the longest managerial reign at the club.

Pizzuti was manager of the Argentina national team between 1970 and 1972, taking the team to fourth place at the Brazilian Independence Cup. The third place decider there, which Argentina lost 2–4 to Yugoslavia, was his last match at the helm of the national side. He had spells as manager of Nueva Chicago in Argentina and Independiente Medellín in Colombia amongst other positions.

=== Titles as a manager ===
Racing

- Primera División Argentina: 1966
- Copa Libertadores: 1967
- Intercontinental Cup: 1967
