= Rubén Héctor Sosa =

Argentine footballer

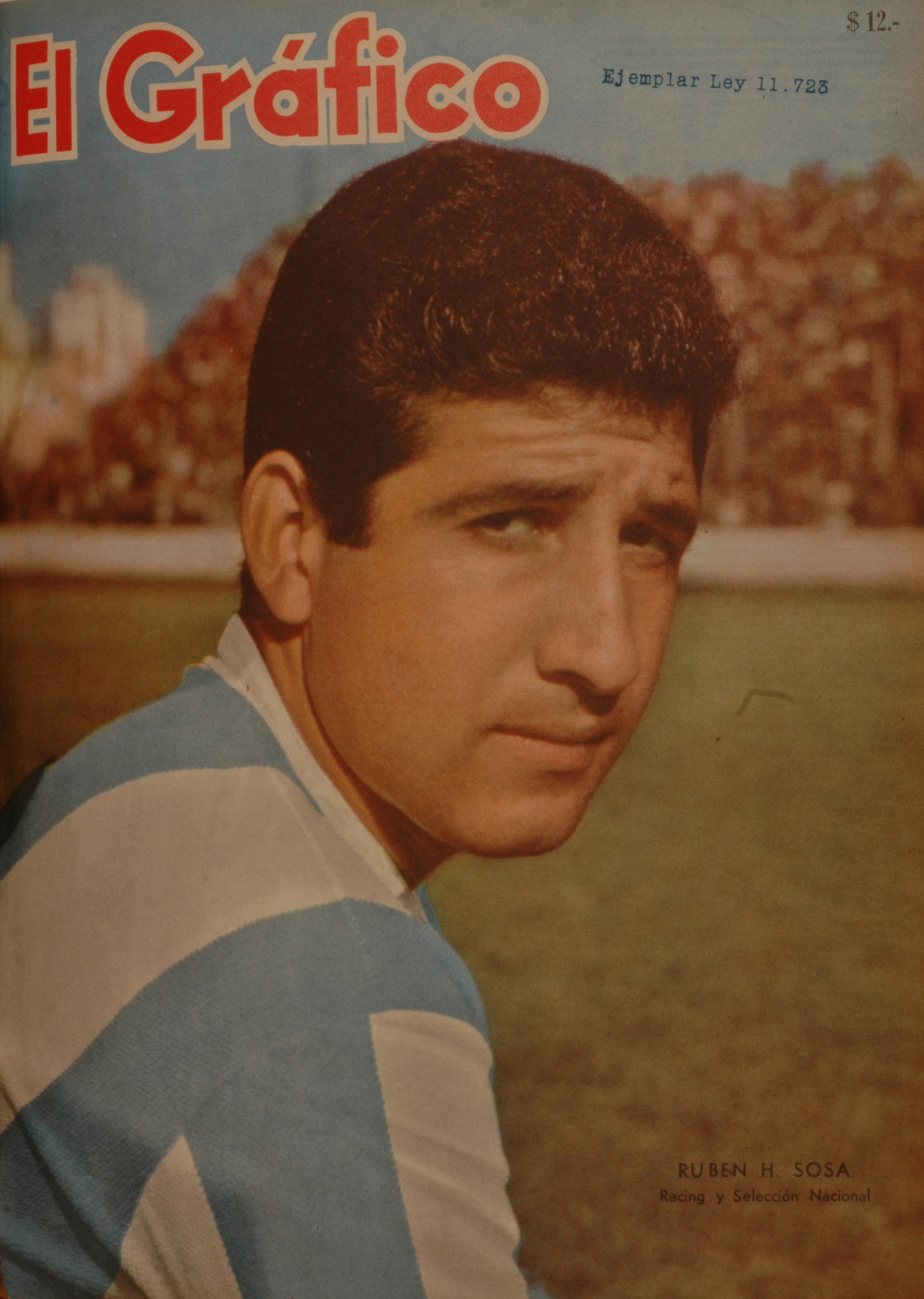
- Sosa in 1961

Personal information
- Date of birth: 14 November 1936
- Place of birth: Las Parejas, Argentina
- Date of death: 13 September 2008 (aged 71)
- Position: Forward

Senior career*
Years	Team	Apps	(Gls)
- Platense
1958–1964	Racing Club	151	(82)
1965–1966	Cerro		
1967	Nacional		
1968	Boston Beacons	17	(7)
1968– ?	Flandria		

International career
1959–1962	Argentina	18	(11)
- * Club domestic league appearances and goals

Rubén Héctor Sosa (14 November 1936 – 13 September 2008) was an Argentine football forward who played for Argentina in the 1962 FIFA World Cup. He was nicknamed Marqués (Marquis). He also played in Argentina for Racing Club, Platense and Flandria, in Uruguay for Cerro and Nacional and in the United States for the Boston Beacons.

== Honours ==
Racing Club

- Primera División: 1958, 1961

Argentina

- Copa América: 1959
