= Alcides Silveira =

Uruguayan footballer (1938–2011)

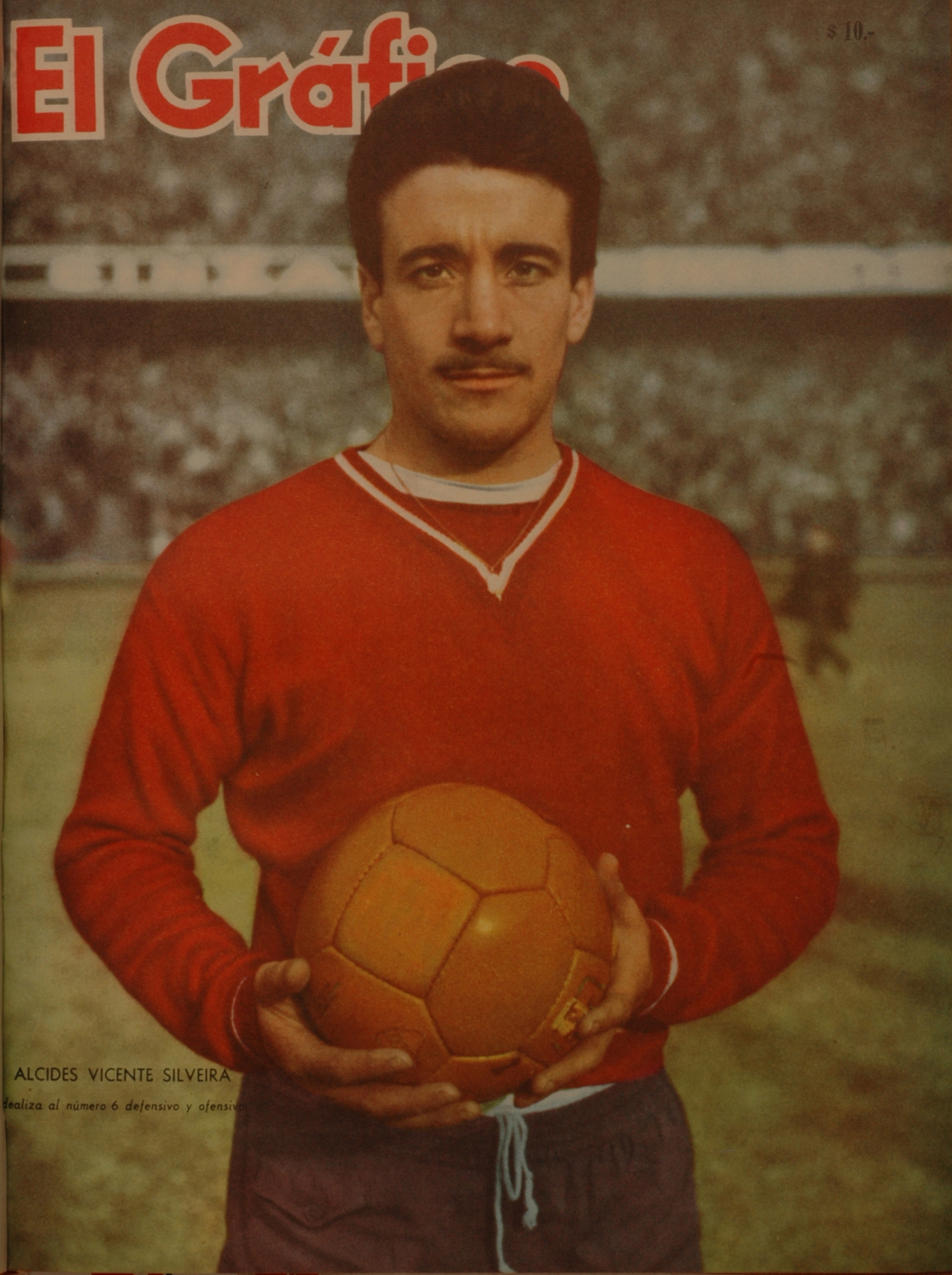
- Silveira in El Gráfico in 1960

Personal information
- Full name: Alcides Silveira Vicente Montero
- Date of birth: 18 March 1938
- Place of birth: Montevideo
- Date of death: 16 January 2011 (aged 72)
- Positions: Midfielder; centre-back

Senior career*
Years	Team	Apps	(Gls)
1955–1960	Sud América		
1960–1962	Independiente		
1963	Barcelona	7	(0)
1963–1968	Boca Juniors		
1968–1969	Nacional		

International career
1959	Uruguay	8	(3)
Medal record
Representing Uruguay
South American Championship
Winner	1959 Ecuador
- * Club domestic league appearances and goals

Alcides Silveira Vicente Montero (18 March 1938 – 16 January 2011) was a Uruguayan football player and coach who played as a midfielder or centre-back. He played for and coached the Uruguay national team.

== Career statistics ==
=== International ===
Appearances and goals by national team and year
National team	Year	Apps	Goals
Uruguay	1959	8	3
Total		8	3

Scores and results list Uruguay's goal tally first, score column indicates score after each Silveira goal.

List of international goals scored by Alcides Silveira
No.	Date	Venue	Opponent	Score	Result	Competition
1	6 December 1959	Estadio Modelo, Guayaquil, Ecuador	Ecuador	1–0	4–0	1959 South American Championship (Ecuador)
2	16 December 1959	Estadio Modelo, Guayaquil, Ecuador	Argentina	1–0	5–0	1959 South American Championship (Ecuador)
3	16 December 1959	Estadio Modelo, Guayaquil, Ecuador	Argentina	4–0	5–0	1959 South American Championship (Ecuador)

== Honours ==
Independiente

- Argentine Primera División: 1960

Boca Juniors

- Argentine Primera División: 1964, 1965

Uruguay

- South American Championship: 1959
