= Mario Bergara (footballer) =

Uruguayan footballer (1937–2001)

Personal information
- Full name: Mario Luis Bergara de Medina
- Date of birth: 1 December 1937
- Place of birth: Montevideo, Uruguay
- Date of death: 28 February 2001 (aged 63)
- Height: 1.72 m (5 ft 7 1/2 in)
- Position: Forward

Senior career*
Years	Team	Apps	(Gls)
1956–1961	Racing CM		
1961–1965	Nacional		
1965–1967	Racing CM		
1967–1969	Montevideo Wanderers		

International career
1959–1965	Uruguay	15	(6)
- * Club domestic league appearances and goals

Mario Luis Bergara de Medina (1 December 1937 – 28 February 2001) was a Uruguayan football player. He played for Uruguay at the 1962 FIFA World Cup, he also played for Racing Club de Montevideo, Club Nacional de Football and Montevideo Wanderers. He was brother of Danny Bergara.

== Teams ==
Club	Country	Played	Goals	Years
Racing Club de Montevideo	Uruguay			1956–1957 1967–1968
Club Nacional de Football	Uruguay	129	69	1961–1967
Montevideo Wanderers F.C.	Uruguay			1968–1969
Seleccion Uruguaya	Uruguay	15	06	1959–1965

== Honors ==
Domestic Trophies
Competition	Club	Country	Year
Torneo Competencia	Nacional	Uruguay	1961
Torneo de Honor	Nacional	Uruguay	1961
Campeonato General Artigas	Nacional	Uruguay	1961
Torneo Competencia	Nacional	Uruguay	1962
Torneo de Honor	Nacional	Uruguay	1962
Campeonato General Artigas	Nacional	Uruguay	1962
Campeonato Uruguayo	Nacional	Uruguay	1963
Torneo Competencia	Nacional	Uruguay	1963
Torneo de Honor	Nacional	Uruguay	1963

International Trophies
Competition	Club	Country	Year
Copa América	Uruguay	Ecuador	1959
