= Copa Apertura Segunda División =

Chilean sporting competition

The Copa Apertura Segunda División was an official football cup competition for Chilean teams playing only in the second level of the Chilean football system. It was played with irregularity between 1969 and 1990.

== Finals ==
| Ed. | Year | Champion | Scores | Runner-up | Trophy |
|---|---|---|---|---|---|
| 1 | 1969 | Naval | 0–3, 3–0 | Ferroviarios | Copa Isidro Corbinos |
| 2 | 1970 | San Antonio Unido | 4–0, 1–2 | Coquimbo Unido | Copa Isidro Corbinos |
| 3 | 1971 | Ñublense | | Deportes Ovalle | Copa Isidro Corbinos |
| 4 | 1973 | Deportes Aviación | 3–2 | Ñublense | Copa Isidro Corbinos |
| 5 | 1979 | Huachipato | 1–0 | Deportes Ovalle | Copa Polla Gol |
| 6 | 1980 | San Luis | 2–1 | Rangers | Copa Polla Gol |
| 7 | 1981 | Deportes Arica | 2–0 | Santiago Morning | Copa Polla Gol |
| 8 | 1982 | Everton | 2–0 | Deportes Colchagua | Copa Polla Gol |
| 9 | 1983 | Huachipato | | San Luis | Copa Polla Gol |
| 10 | 1984 | Iberia | 2–1, 3–0 | Curicó Unido | Copa Polla Gol |
| 11 | 1986 | O'Higgins | 2–1 | Santiago Wanderers | Copa Polla Lan Chile |
| 12 | 1987 | Deportes Temuco | | Deportes La Serena | Copa Lan Chile |
| 13 | 1990 | Deportes Antofagasta | 2–1 | Deportes Puerto Montt | Copa Apertura |

== Titles by club ==
| Club | Titles | Runners-up | Seasons won | Seasons runner-up |
|---|---|---|---|---|
| Huachipato | 2 | — | 1979, 1983 | — |
| Ñublense | 1 | 1 | 1971 | 1973 |
| San Luis | 1 | 1 | 1980 | 1983 |
| Deportes Antofagasta | 1 | — | 1990 | — |
| Deportes Arica | 1 | — | 1981 | — |
| Deportes Aviación | 1 | — | 1973 | — |
| Deportes Temuco | 1 | — | 1987 | — |
| Everton | 1 | — | 1982 | — |
| Iberia | 1 | — | 1984 | — |
| Naval | 1 | — | 1969 | — |
| O'Higgins | 1 | — | 1986 | — |
| Rangers | 1 | — | 1980 | — |
| San Antonio Unido | 1 | — | 1970 | — |
| Deportes Ovalle | — | 2 | — | 1971, 1979 |
| Coquimbo Unido | — | 1 | — | 1970 |
| Curicó Unido | — | 1 | — | 1984 |
| Deportes Colchagua | — | 1 | — | 1982 |
| Deportes La Serena | — | 1 | — | 1987 |
| Deportes Puerto Montt | — | 1 | — | 1990 |
| Santiago Morning | — | 1 | — | 1981 |
| Santiago Wanderers | — | 1 | — | 1986 |

== Notes and references ==
- Chile Cup - RSSSF
