= 1959 South American Championship (Argentina) =

Football tournament

Tournament details
- Host country: Argentina
- City: Buenos Aires
- Dates: 7 March – 4 April
- Teams: 7 (from 1 confederation)
- Venue: Monumental Stadium

Final positions
- Champions: Argentina (12th title)
- Runners-up: Brazil
- Third place: Paraguay
- Fourth place: Peru

Tournament statistics
- Matches played: 21
- Goals scored: 86 (4.1 per match)
- Top scorer: (Brazil) Pelé (8 goals)
- Best player: (Brazil) Pelé

The South American Championship 1959 was a football tournament held in Argentina, and won by Argentina with Brazil as runner-up. Colombia and Ecuador withdrew from the tournament. Pelé from Brazil was named best player of the tournament and was the top scorer with 8 goals.

== Venues ==
Buenos Aires
Estadio Monumental
Capacity: 67,664
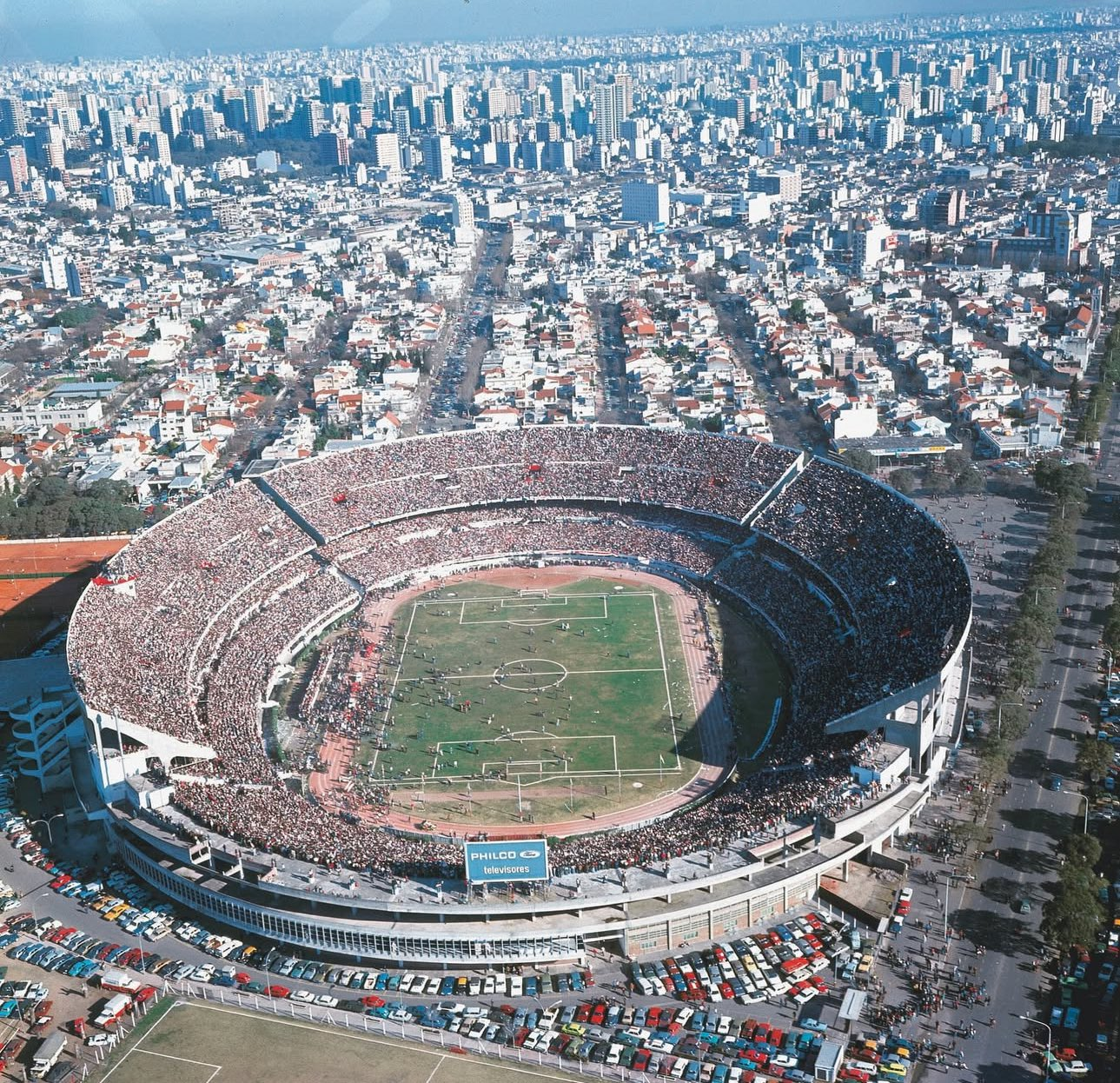

== Final round ==
Team	Pld	W	D	L	GF	GA	GD	Pts
Argentina	6	5	1	0	19	5	+14	11
Brazil	6	4	2	0	17	7	+10	10
Paraguay	6	3	0	3	12	12	0	6
Peru	6	1	3	2	10	11	−1	5
Chile	6	2	1	3	9	14	−5	5
Uruguay	6	2	0	4	15	14	+1	4
Bolivia	6	0	1	5	4	23	−19	1

7 March 1959

Argentina	6–1	Chile
Pedro Manfredini 5', 50'; Pedro Callá 7'; Juan José Pizzuti 17', 39'; Raúl Belén 75'		Luis Álvarez 25'

Estadio Monumental, Buenos Aires
Attendance: 70,000
Referee: Washington Rodríguez (Uruguay)

8 March 1959

Uruguay	7–0	Bolivia
José Sasía 5'; Guillermo Escalada 12'; Víctor Guaglianone 17'; Carlos Borges 60', 65'; Vladas Douksas 69'; Domingo Pérez 89'

Estadio Monumental, Buenos Aires
Attendance: 35,000
Referee: Alberto Da Gama Malcher (Brazil)

10 March 1959

Brazil	2–2	Peru
Didi 24'; Pelé 48'		Juan Seminario 59', 77'

Estadio Monumental, Buenos Aires
Attendance: 45,000
Referee: Carlos Robles (Chile)

11 March 1959

Paraguay	2–1	Chile
José Aveiro 8', 14'		Leonel Sánchez 34' (pen.)

Estadio Monumental, Buenos Aires
Attendance: 45,000
Referee: Luis Ventre (Argentina)

11 March 1959

Argentina	2–0	Bolivia
Omar Corbatta 2'; Pedro Callá 79'

Estadio Monumental, Buenos Aires
Attendance: 45,000
Referee: Carlos Robles (Chile)

14 March 1959

Peru	5–3	Uruguay
Miguel Ángel Loayza 4', 27', 42'; Juan Joya 29', 79'		Héctor Demarco 2'; Vladas Douksas 31'; José Sasía 81'

Estadio Monumental, Buenos Aires
Attendance: 40,000
Referee: Carlos Robles (Chile)

15 March 1959

Paraguay	5–0	Bolivia
Cayetano Ré 1', 21', 50'; Ildefonso Sanabria 11'; José Aveiro 51'

Estadio Monumental, Buenos Aires
Attendance: 40,000
Referee: Alberto Da Gama Malcher (Brazil)

15 March 1959

Brazil	3–0	Chile
Pelé 43', 45'; Didi 89'

Estadio Monumental, Buenos Aires
Attendance: 40,000
Referee: Alberto Tejada (Peru)

18 March 1959

Uruguay	3–1	Paraguay
Héctor Demarco 2'; Vladas Douksas 37'; José Sasía 85'		José Aveiro 77'

Estadio Monumental, Buenos Aires
Attendance: 70,000
Referee: Carlos Robles (Chile)

18 March 1959

Argentina	3–1	Peru
Omar Corbatta 18' (pen.); Rubén Sosa 42'; Víctor Benítez 78' (o.g.)		Miguel Ángel Loayza 51'

Estadio Monumental, Buenos Aires
Attendance: 70,000
Referee: Alberto Da Gama Malcher (Brazil)

21 March 1959

Brazil	4–2	Bolivia
Pelé 16'; Paulo Valentim 18', 26'; Didi 89'		Ricardo Alcón 12'; Ausberto García 22'

Estadio Monumental, Buenos Aires
Attendance: 25,000
Referee: Luis Ventre (Argentina)

21 March 1959

Chile	1–1	Peru
Armando Tobar 77'		Miguel Ángel Loayza 12'

Estadio Monumental, Buenos Aires
Attendance: 50,000
Referee: Washington Rodríguez (Uruguay)

22 March 1959

Argentina	3–1	Paraguay
Omar Corbatta 15'; Rubén Sosa 63'; Vladislao Cap 69'		Silvio Parodi 36'

Estadio Monumental, Buenos Aires
Attendance: 50,000
Referee: Carlos Robles (Chile)

26 March 1959

Chile	5–2	Bolivia
Mario Soto 7', 42'; Juan Soto Mura 17', 51'; Leonel Sánchez 89'		Máximo Alcócer 25', 76'

Estadio Monumental, Buenos Aires
Attendance: 70,000
Referee: Luis Ventre (Argentina)

26 March 1959

Brazil	3–1	Uruguay
Paulo Valentim 62', 80', 89'		Guillermo Escalada 36'

Estadio Monumental, Buenos Aires
Attendance: 70,000
Referee: Carlos Robles (Chile)

29 March 1959

Peru	0–0	Bolivia

Estadio Monumental, Buenos Aires
Attendance: 40,000
Referee: Washington Rodríguez (Uruguay)

29 March 1959

Brazil	4–1	Paraguay
Pelé 25', 31', 63'; Chinesinho 35'		Silvio Parodi 4'

Estadio Monumental, Buenos Aires
Attendance: 40,000
Referee: Carlos Robles (Chile)

30 March 1959

Argentina	4–1	Uruguay
Raúl Belén 15', 60'; Rubén Sosa 55', 80'		Héctor Demarco 85'

Estadio Monumental, Buenos Aires
Attendance: 80,000
Referee: Isidro Ramírez (Paraguay)

2 April 1959

Paraguay	2–1	Peru
José Aveiro 32', 68'		Gómez Sánchez 51'

Estadio Monumental, Buenos Aires
Attendance: 5,000
Referee: Alberto Da Gama Malcher (Brazil)

2 April 1959

Chile	1–0	Uruguay
Mario Moreno 88'

Estadio Monumental, Buenos Aires
Attendance: 5,000
Referee: Alberto Tejada (Peru)

4 April 1959

Argentina	1–1	Brazil
Juan José Pizzuti 40'		Pelé 58'

Estadio Monumental, Buenos Aires
Attendance: 85,000
Referee: Carlos Robles (Chile)

== Result ==
1959 South American Championship champions

Argentina
12th title

== Goalscorers ==
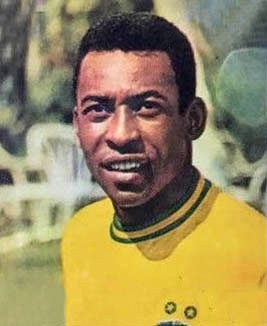
Pelé, top scorer

With eight goals, Pelé of Brazil is the top scorer in the tournament. In total, 86 goals were scored by 36 different players, with only one of them credited as own goal.

8 goals

- (Brazil) Pelé

6 goals

- (Paraguay) José Aveiro

5 goals

- (Brazil) Paulo Valentim
- (Peru) Miguel Angel Loayza

4 goals

- (Argentina) Rubén Héctor Sosa

3 goals

- (Argentina) Juan José Pizzuti
- (Argentina) Oreste Corbatta
- (Argentina) Raúl Belén
- (Brazil) Didi
- (Paraguay) Cayetano Ré
- (Uruguay) Héctor Demarco
- (Uruguay) José Sasía
- (Uruguay) Vladas Douksas

2 goals

- (Argentina) Pedro Eugenio Callá
- (Argentina) Pedro Waldemar Manfredini
- (Bolivia) Máximo Alcócer
- (Chile) Juan Soto Mura
- (Chile) Leonel Sánchez
- (Chile) Mario Soto
- (Paraguay) Silvio Parodi
- (Peru) Juan Joya
- (Peru) Juan Seminario
- (Uruguay) Carlos Borges
- (Uruguay) Guillermo Escalada

1 goal

- (Argentina) Vladislao Cap
- (Bolivia) Ausberto García
- (Bolivia) Ricardo Alcón
- (Brazil) Chinesinho
- (Chile) Luis Hernán Álvarez
- (Chile) Mario Moreno
- (Chile) Tovar
- (Paraguay) Ildefonso Sanabria
- (Peru) Óscar Gómez Sánchez
- (Uruguay) Domingo Pérez
- (Uruguay) Víctor Guaglianone

Own goal

- (Peru) Víctor Benítez (playing against Argentina)

== Controversy ==
Originally, the 1959 Copa America was scheduled to be hosted by Ecuador. However, due to financial difficulties and infrastructure challenges, Ecuador withdrew as the host nation just a few months before the tournament was set to begin. This sudden withdrawal left CONMEBOL in a difficult situation to find a replacement host at such short notice.

In response to Ecuador's withdrawal, Argentina volunteered to step in as the new host for the tournament. The Argentine Football Association (AFA) had the necessary resources and infrastructure to organize the event. Consequently, Argentina was granted the hosting rights, and the tournament was scheduled to take place in Buenos Aires.

However, a disagreement arose among some South American nations regarding the legitimacy of Argentina being granted the hosting rights without a proper bidding process. A group of countries, including Brazil, Uruguay, and Chile, refused to participate in the tournament hosted by Argentina and organized their own competition called the "Copa del Atlántico", in response.

Meanwhile, Argentina went ahead with its plans and organized the Copa America as scheduled, inviting other CONMEBOL member nations to participate. The tournament took place from March 7 to April 4, 1959, and was won by Argentina.

After the initial Copa America tournament held in Argentina from March to April 1959, there was indeed a second Copa America held in Ecuador later that year. The second tournament took place in Guayaquil and Quito, Ecuador, from December 5 to 25, 1959.

The decision to hold a second Copa America in Ecuador was made to commemorate the 100th anniversary of the birth of Eloy Alfaro, a prominent Ecuadorian political figure. The tournament was officially named the "Copa del Centenario de la Batalla de Quito" (Centenary Cup of the Battle of Quito) to honor this occasion. Uruguay emerged as champions, securing their 10th title in the tournament's history.

== Team of the Tournament ==
The following players were selected for the 1959 South American Championship Team of the Tournament (Ecuador).

Goalkeeper	Defenders	Midfielders	Forwards
(Ecuador) Alfredo Bonnard	(Uruguay) José Sasía (Argentina) Juan Carlos Murúa (Ecuador) Raúl Argüello	(Uruguay) Alcides Silveira (Uruguay) Mario Bergara (Ecuador) Clímaco Cañarte	(Argentina) José Sanfilippo (Ecuador) Alberto Spencer (Ecuador) José Vicente Balseca (Uruguay) Héctor Núñez
