= Peru national football team results (1927–1979) =

The Peru national football team has represented Peru in international football since 1927. Their first match came against Uruguay at the 1927 South American Championship. This is a list of the Peru national football team results from 1927 to 1979.

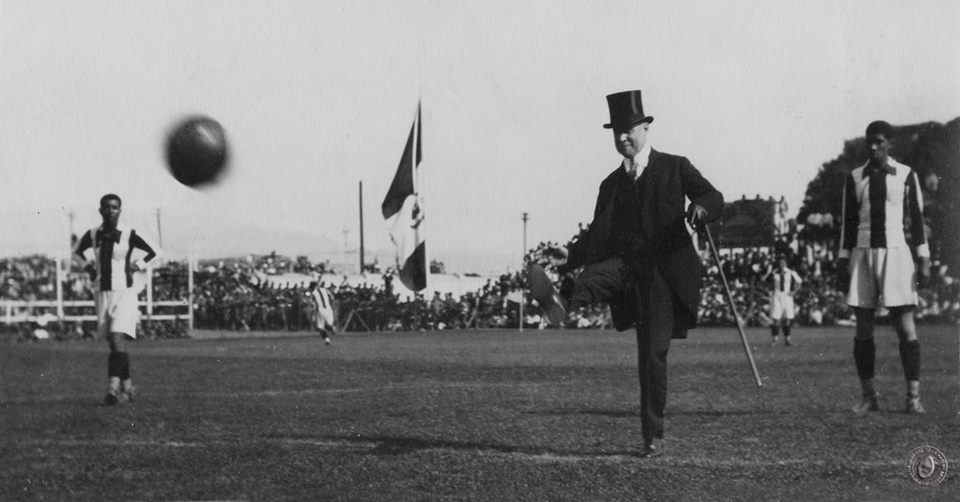
The United States ambassador to Peru, Miles Poindexter, kicking off before the Peru v. Argentina match played at South American Championship in Lima.

== Results ==
Key
Win
Draw
Defeat

=== 1927 ===
1 November 1927 South American Championship	Uruguay	4–0	Peru	Lima
	Ulloa 49' (o.g.); Sacco 52', 71'; Castro 75'			Stadium: Estadio Nacional; Referee: Consolato Nay Foino (Argentina)

13 November 1927 South American Championship	Peru	3–2	Bolivia	Lima
	Neyra 31'; Sarmiento 41'; Montellanos 43'		Bustamante 13', 14'	Stadium: Estadio Nacional; Referee: Alberto Parodi (Chile)

27 November 1927 South American Championship	Argentina	5–1	Peru	Lima
	Ferreira 1', 30'; Maglio 22', 25'; Carricaberry 38'		Villanueva 3'	Stadium: Estadio Nacional; Referee: Victorio Gariboni (Bolivia)

=== 1929 ===
3 November 1929 South American Championship	Argentina	3–0	Peru	Buenos Aires
	Peucelle 6'; Zumelzú 38', 58'			Stadium: Estadio Gasómetro; Referee: Aníbal Tejada (Uruguay)

11 November 1929 South American Championship	Peru	1–4	Uruguay	Buenos Aires
	Lizarbe 81'		Fernández 21', 29', 43'; Andrade 69'	Stadium: Estadio Alvear y Tagle; Referee: Miguel Barba (Paraguay)

16 November 1929 South American Championship	Paraguay	5–0	Peru	Avellaneda
	Nessi 10'; González 55', 63', 69'; Domínguez 82'			Stadium: Independiente Stadium; Referee: José Galli (Argentina)

=== 1930 ===
14 July 1930 FIFA World Cup Group 3	Romania	3–1	Peru	Montevideo
14:50 UYT (UTC−03:30)	Deșu 1'; Stanciu 79'; Kovács 89'	Report	De Souza 75'	Stadium: Estadio Pocitos; Attendance: 2,549; Referee: Alberto Warnken (Chile)

18 July 1930 FIFA World Cup Group 3	Uruguay	1–0	Peru	Montevideo
14:30 UYT (UTC−03:30)	Castro 65'	Report		Stadium: Estadio Centenario; Attendance: 57,735; Referee: John Langenus (Belgium)

=== 1935 ===
13 January 1935 South American Championship	Uruguay	1–0	Peru	Lima
	Castro 80'			Stadium: Estadio Nacional; Referee: Humberto Reginato (Chile)

20 January 1935 South American Championship	Argentina	4–1	Peru	Lima
	Masantonio 10', 61', 81'; García 50'		Fernández 2'	Stadium: Estadio Nacional; Referee: César Pioli (Uruguay)

26 January 1935 South American Championship	Peru	1–0	Chile	Lima
	Montellanos 5'			Stadium: Estadio Nacional; Referee: Eduardo Forte (Argentina)

=== 1936 ===
6 August 1936 Summer Olympics - First round	Peru	7–3	Finland	Berlin
	Fernández 17', 33', 47', 49', 70'; Villanueva 21', 67'	Report	Kanerva 42' (pen.); Grönlund 75'; Larvo 80'	Stadium: Hertha-BSC-Platz; Attendance: 2,500; Referee: Rinaldo Barlassina (Italy)

8 August 1936 Summer Olympics - Quarter-finals	Peru	4–2 (a.e.t.)	Austria	Berlin
	Alcalde 75'; Villanueva 81', 117'; Fernández 119'	Report	Werginz 23'; Steinmetz 37'	Stadium: Hertha-BSC Platz; Attendance: 5,000; Referee: Thoralf Kristiansen (Norway)

27 December 1937 South American Championship	Brazil	3–2	Peru	Buenos Aires
	Roberto 7'; Afonsinho 30'; Niginho 57'		Fernández 55'; Villanueva 58'	Stadium: Estadio Gasómetro; Referee: Alfredo Vargas (Chile)

=== 1937 ===
6 January 1937 South American Championship	Uruguay	4–2	Peru	Buenos Aires
	Camaití 16'; Varela 31', 56'; Píriz 79'		Fernández 29'; Magallanes 40'	Stadium: Estadio Gasómetro; Referee: Alfredo Vargas (Chile)

16 January 1937 South American Championship	Argentina	1–0	Peru	Buenos Aires
	Zozaya 55'			Stadium: Estadio Gasómetro; Referee: Aníbal Tejada (Uruguay)

21 January 1937 South American Championship	Peru	2–2	Chile	Buenos Aires
	Alcalde 1', 26'		Torres 16'; Carmona 70'	Stadium: Estadio Gasómetro; Referee: José Bartolomé Macías (Argentina)

24 January 1937 South American Championship	Paraguay	0–1	Peru	Buenos Aires
			Lavalle 43'	Stadium: Estadio Alvear y Tagle; Referee: Aníbal Tejada (Uruguay)

=== 1938 ===
8 August 1938 Bolivarian Games	Colombia	2–4	Peru	Bogotá
10:45 UTC−5	Botto 71', 75'	Report	Ibáñez 10', 61'; Fernández 41'; Alcalde 56'	Stadium: Estadio Ciudad Universitaria; Attendance: 20,000; Referee: Esteva Tejada (Mexico)

11 August 1938 Bolivarian Games	Peru	9–1	Ecuador	Bogotá
	Espinar 14', 24', 50'; Alcalde 40', 43', 60', 88'; Bielich 65', 68'	Report	Suárez 16'	Stadium: Estadio Ciudad Universitaria; Referee: Esteva Tejada (Mexico)

14 August 1938 Bolivarian Games	Peru	3–0	Bolivia	Bogotá
	Fernández 18', 85'; Alcalde 33'	Report		Stadium: Estadio Ciudad Universitaria; Referee: Esteva Tejada (Mexico)

17 August 1938 Bolivarian Games	Peru	2–1	Venezuela	Bogotá
	Bielich 44' (pen.); Paredes 47'	Report	Ríos 75'	Stadium: Estadio Ciudad Universitaria; Referee: Esteva Tejada (Mexico)

=== 1939 ===
15 January 1939 South American Championship	Peru	5–2	Ecuador	Lima
	Fernández 6', 34', 77'; Alcalde 16', 58'		Alcívar 55', 89'	Stadium: Estadio Nacional; Referee: Carlos Puyol (Uruguay)

22 January 1939 South American Championship	Peru	3–1	Chile	Lima
	Fernández 46', 65' (pen.); Alcalde 80'		Domínguez 55'	Stadium: Estadio Nacional; Referee: Carlos Puyol (Uruguay)

29 January 1939 South American Championship	Peru	3–0	Paraguay	Lima
	Fernández 11', 30'; Alcalde 78'			Stadium: Estadio Nacional; Referee: Alfredo Vargas (Chile)

12 February 1939 South American Championship	Peru	2–1	Uruguay	Lima
	Alcalde 7'; Bielich 35'		Porta 44'	Stadium: Estadio Nacional; Referee: Alfredo Vargas (Chile)

=== 1941 ===
19 January Copa Roque Sáenz Peña	Peru	1–1	Argentina	Lima
	Hurtado	Report	Belén 53'	Stadium: Estadio Nacional; Referee: Lizardo Lópes Torres (Peru)

26 January Copa Roque Sáenz Peña	Peru	1–1	Argentina	Lima
	Magallanes 41'	Report	Belén 12'	Stadium: Estadio Nacional; Referee: Enrique Cuenca (Peru)

29 January Copa Roque Sáenz Peña	Peru	0–3	Argentina	Lima
		Report	Moreno 55'; Sastre 74'; Marvezzi 89'	Stadium: Estadio Nacional; Referee: Enrique Cuenca (Peru)

9 February 1941 South American Championship	Chile	1–0	Peru	Santiago
	Pérez 20'			Stadium: Estadio Nacional; Referee: José Bartolomé Macías (Argentina)

12 February 1941 South American Championship	Argentina	2–1	Peru	Santiago
	Moreno 2', 72'		Socarraz 53'	Stadium: Estadio Nacional; Referee: Alfredo Vargas (Chile)

23 February 1941 South American Championship	Peru	4–0	Ecuador	Santiago
	Fernández 25', 32', 48'; Vallejas 36'			Stadium: Estadio Nacional; Referee: Víctor Francisco Rivas (Chile)

26 February 1941 South American Championship	Uruguay	2–0	Peru	Santiago
	Riephoff 37'; Varela 70'			Stadium: Estadio Nacional; Referee: José Bartolomé Macías (Argentina)

=== 1942 ===
18 January 1942 South American Championship	Paraguay	1–1	Peru	Montevideo
	Barrios 35'		Magallanes 1'	Stadium: Estadio Centenario; Referee: José Bartolomé Macías (Argentina)

21 January 1942 South American Championship	Brazil	2–1	Peru	Montevideo
	Amorim 43', 56'		Fernández 73'	Stadium: Estadio Centenario; Referee: Marcos Gerinaldo Rojas (Paraguay)

25 January 1942 South American Championship	Argentina	3–1	Peru	Montevideo
	Heredia 12'; Moreno 65', 72'		Fernández 17'	Stadium: Estadio Centenario; Referee: Aníbal Tejada (Uruguay)

28 January 1942 South American Championship	Peru	2–1	Ecuador	Montevideo
	Quiñónez 32'; Guzmán 62'		Jiménez 52'	Stadium: Estadio Centenario; Referee: Aníbal Tejada (Uruguay)

1 February 1942 South American Championship	Uruguay	3–0	Peru	Montevideo
	Chirimini 47'; Castro 54'; Porta 77'			Stadium: Estadio Centenario; Referee: José Bartolomé Macías (Argentina)

7 February 1942 South American Championship	Chile	0–0	Peru	Montevideo
				Stadium: Estadio Centenario; Referee: José Bartolomé Macías (Argentina)

=== 1947 ===
6 December 1947 South American Championship	Peru	2–2	Paraguay	Guayaquil
	Castillo 17'; Mosquera 63'		Villalba 38'; Marín 74'	Stadium: Estadio George Capwell; Attendance: 20,000; Referee: Luis Alberto Fernández (Uruguay)

9 December 1947 South American Championship	Chile	2–1	Peru	Guayaquil
	Varela 25'; Busquets 71'		López 72'	Stadium: Estadio George Capwell; Attendance: 15,000; Referee: Juan José Álvarez (Argentina)

11 December 1947 South American Championship	Argentina	3–2	Peru	Guayaquil
	Moreno 41'; Di Stefano 55'; Boyé 56'		Gómez Sánchez 25'; López 65' (red card); Torres (red card)	Stadium: Estadio George Capwell; Attendance: 22,000; Referee: Luis Alberto Fernández (Uruguay)

20 December 1947 South American Championship	Peru	0–0	Ecuador	Guayaquil
				Stadium: Estadio George Capwell; Attendance: 20,000; Referee: Mario Rubén Hayn (Paraguay)

23 December 1947 South American Championship	Peru	5–1	Colombia	Guayaquil
	Mosquera 3'; Guzmán 53', 79'; Gómez Sánchez 67', 81'		Arango 48'	Stadium: Estadio George Capwell; Attendance: 5,000; Referee: Federico Muñoz Medina (Ecuador)

26 December 1947 South American Championship	Uruguay	1–0	Peru	Guayaquil
	Falero 74'		González (red card) 67'	Stadium: Estadio George Capwell; Attendance: 6,000; Referee: Victor Francisco Rivas (Chile)

27 December 1947 South American Championship	Bolivia	0–2	Peru	Guayaquil
			Castillo 73'; Guzmán 82'	Stadium: Estadio George Capwell; Attendance: 5,000; Referee: Mario Rubén Hayn (Paraguay)

=== 1949 ===
10 April 1949 South American Championship	Peru	4–0	Colombia	Rio de Janeiro
	Pedraza 22', 90'; Drago 47'; Castillo 85'			Stadium: São Januário; Attendance: 15,000; Referee: Mario Rubén Heyn (Paraguay)

13 April 1949 South American Championship	Paraguay	3–1	Peru	Rio de Janeiro
	Barrios 38' (pen.); Arce 56'; López Fretes 67'		Drago 89'	Stadium: São Januário; Attendance: 30,000; Referee: Cyril Jack Barrick (England)

20 April 1949 South American Championship	Peru	4–0	Ecuador	Rio de Janeiro
	Salinas 26'; Bermeo 36' (o.g.) (red card); Castillo 50'; Pedraza 85'			Stadium: São Januário; Attendance: 7,000; Referee: Juan Carlos Armental (Uruguay)

24 April 1949 South American Championship	Brazil	7–1	Peru	Rio de Janeiro
	Arce 11' (o.g.); Augusto 15'; Jair 17', 20'; Simão 54'; Ademir 82'; Orlando 88'; Zizinho (red card) 40'		Salinas 44'; Calderón (red card) 40'; González (red card)	Stadium: São Januário; Attendance: 45,000; Referee: Cyril Jack Barrick (England)

27 April 1949 South American Championship	Peru	3–0	Bolivia	Santos
	Drago 31', 74'; Heredia 77' (pen.)			Stadium: Estádio Vila Belmiro; Attendance: 12,000; Referee: Alberto Da Gama Malcher (Brazil)

30 April 1949 South American Championship	Peru	3–0	Chile	São Paulo
	Mosquera 28', 73'; Castillo 58'			Stadium: Estádio do Pacaembu; Attendance: 1,000; Referee: Mário Gardelli (Brazil)

4 May 1949 South American Championship	Peru	4–3	Uruguay	Rio de Janeiro
	Mosquera 19'; Castillo 43'; Gómez Sánchez 57', 60'		Moll 58'; Castro 60'; Ayala 85'	Stadium: Estádio General Severiano; Attendance: 20,000; Referee: Alfredo Alvarez (Bolivia)

=== 1952 ===
23 March 1952 Panamerican Championship	Peru	7–1	Panama	Santiago
	López 5', 9', 20', 85', 87'; Barbadillo 44'; Morales 60'	Report	Martínez 72' (pen.)	Stadium: Estadio Nacional

30 March 1952 Panamerican Championship	Uruguay	5–2	Peru	Santiago
	Vidal 2'; Míguez 11', 29', 87'; Pérez 74'	Report	Barbadillo 19'; López 75'	Stadium: Estadio Nacional

2 April 1952 Panamerican Championship	Chile	3–2	Peru	Santiago
18:00 UTC−4	Prieto 31'; Meléndez 51' (pen.); Cremaschi 86'	Report	Barbadillo 14'; López 81'	Stadium: Estadio Nacional; Attendance: 51,220; Referee: John Aldbridge (England)

10 April 1952 Panamerican Championship	Brazil	0–0	Peru	Santiago
		Report		Stadium: Estadio Nacional

20 April 1952 Panamerican Championship	Peru	3–0	Mexico	Santiago
	Rivera 5'; Drago 16'; Torres 86'	Report		Stadium: Estadio Nacional

=== 1953 ===
22 February 1953 South American Championship	Bolivia	1–0	Peru	Lima
	Ugarte 53'			Stadium: Estadio Nacional; Attendance: 50,000; Referee: George Rhoden (England)

28 February 1953 South American Championship	Peru	1–0	Ecuador	Lima
	Gómez Sánchez 78'			Stadium: Estadio Nacional; Attendance: 50,000; Referee: George Rhoden (England)

4 March 1953 South American Championship	Chile	0–0	Peru	Lima
				Stadium: Estadio Nacional; Attendance: 45,000; Referee: Richard Maddison (England)

8 March 1953 South American Championship	Peru	2–2; Awarded	Paraguay	Lima
	Gómez Sánchez 47'; Terry 53'		Fernández 36'; Berni 77'	Stadium: Estadio Nacional; Attendance: 45,000; Referee: Richard Maddison (England)

19 March 1953 South American Championship	Peru	1–0	Brazil	Lima
	Navarrete 51'			Stadium: Estadio Nacional; Attendance: 55,000; Referee: Charles McKenna (England)

28 March 1953 South American Championship	Uruguay	3–0	Peru	Lima
	Peláez 23', 67'; Romero 71'			Stadium: Estadio Nacional; Attendance: 45,000; Referee: Mário Vianna (Brazil)

26 July Copa del Pacífico	Peru	1–2	Chile	Lima
	Navarrete 57'	Report	Hormazábal 44'; Robledo 86'	Stadium: Estadio Nacional; Attendance: 33,175; Referee: Charles McKenna (England)

28 July Copa del Pacífico	Peru	5–0	Chile	Lima
	Terry 7'; Heredia 50', 67' (pen.); Cortés 52' (o.g.); Roldán 55' (o.g.)	Report		Stadium: Estadio Nacional; Attendance: 29,377; Referee: Charles McKenna (England)

=== 1954 ===
17 September Copa del Pacífico	Chile	2–1	Peru	Santiago
	Meléndez 30'; Musso 68'	Report	Mosquera 59'	Stadium: Estadio Nacional; Attendance: 21,116; Referee: Carlos Robles (Chile)

19 September Copa del Pacífico	Chile	2–4	Peru	Santiago
	Meléndez 37', 60'	Report	Terry 59', 67'; Gómez Sánchez 73', 78'	Stadium: Estadio Nacional; Attendance: 21,051; Referee: Carlos Robles (Chile)

=== 1955 ===
6 March 1955 South American Championship	Chile	5–4	Peru	Santiago
	Muñoz 9'; Robledo 13', 57'; Hormazábal 52'; Ramírez 84'		Castillo 35'; Barbadillo 62'; Heredia 63' (pen.); Gómez Sánchez 83'	Stadium: Estadio Nacional; Attendance: 50,000; Referee: Harry Dykes (England)

13 March 1955 South American Championship	Peru	4–2	Ecuador	Santiago
	Gómez Sánchez 11', 15'; Gonzabay 29', 88' (o.g.)		Matute 34', 61'	Stadium: Estadio Nacional; Attendance: 50,000; Referee: Carlos Robles (Chile)

16 March 1955 South American Championship	Argentina	2–2	Peru	Santiago
	Grillo 7'; Cecconato 41'		Gómez Sánchez 23', 57'	Stadium: Estadio Nacional; Attendance: 23,000; Referee: Washington Rodríguez (Uruguay)

23 March 1955 South American Championship	Peru	1–1	Paraguay	Santiago
	Terry 33'		Rolón 65'	Stadium: Estadio Nacional; Attendance: 25,000; Referee: Juan Regis Brozzi (Argentina)

30 March 1955 South American Championship	Peru	2–1	Uruguay	Santiago
	Castillo 11'; Gómez Sánchez 68'		Morel 72'	Stadium: Estadio Nacional; Attendance: 65,000; Referee: Carlos Robles (Chile)

=== 1956 ===
22 January 1956 South American Championship	Argentina	2–1	Peru	Montevideo
	Sívori 43'; Vairo 51'		Drago 56'	Stadium: Estadio Centenario; Attendance: 16,000; Referee: Washington Rodríguez (Uruguay)

28 January 1956 South American Championship	Uruguay	2–0	Peru	Montevideo
	Escalada 42'; Míguez 73'			Stadium: Estadio Centenario; Attendance: 70,000; Referee: Cayetano de Nicola (Paraguay)

1 February 1956 South American Championship	Brazil	2–1	Peru	Montevideo
	Álvaro 10'; Zezinho 80'		Drago 42'	Stadium: Estadio Centenario; Attendance: 20,000; Referee: Washington Rodríguez (Uruguay)

5 February 1956 South American Championship	Paraguay	1–1	Peru	Montevideo
	Rolón 76'		Andrade 61'	Stadium: Estadio Centenario; Attendance: 25,000; Referee: Juan Regis Brozzi (Argentina)

9 February 1956 South American Championship	Chile	4–3	Peru	Montevideo
	Hormazábal 15'; Muñoz 34'; Fernández 70'; Sánchez 86'		Castillo 22'; Mosquera 57'; Gómez Sánchez 80'	Stadium: Estadio Centenario; Attendance: 5,000; Referee: Juan Regis Brozzi (Argentina)

28 February 1956 Panamerican Championship	Argentina	0–0	Peru	Mexico City
		Report		Stadium: Estadio Olímpico Universitario

4 March 1956 Panamerican Championship	Mexico	0–2	Peru	Mexico City
		Report	Drago 26'; Gómez Sánchez 71'	Stadium: Estadio Olímpico Universitario

6 March 1956 Panamerican Championship	Brazil	1–0	Peru	Mexico City
	Larry 41'	Report		Stadium: Estadio Olímpico Universitario

15 March 1956 Panamerican Championship	Peru	2–2	Chile	Mexico City
	Lama 23'; Mosquera 73'	Report	Díaz 18'; Cortés 85'	Stadium: Estadio Olímpico Universitario; Referee: Danilo Alfaro (Costa Rica)

17 March 1956 Panamerican Championship	Costa Rica	4–2	Peru	Mexico City
	Murillo 17', 84'; Herrera 42'; Monge 43'	Report	Salinas 55', 69'	Stadium: Estadio Olímpico Universitario

=== 1957 ===
10 March 1957 South American Championship	Peru	2–1	Ecuador	Lima
	Terry 29', 37' (pen.)		Cantos 44'	Stadium: Estadio Nacional; Attendance: 55,000; Referee: Robert Turner (England)

16 March 1957 South American Championship	Peru	1–0	Chile	Lima
	Mosquera 57'			Stadium: Estadio Nacional; Attendance: 60,000; Referee: Ronald Lynch (England)

23 March 1957 South American Championship	Uruguay	5–3	Peru	Lima
	Ambrois 22', 48', 60', 75'; Carranza 26'		Terry 3'; Seminario 81'; Mosquera 83'	Stadium: Estadio Nacional; Attendance: 55,000; Referee: Bertley Cross (England)

27 March 1957 South American Championship	Peru	4–1	Colombia	Lima
	Terry 34'; Rivera 35', 37'; Bassa 83'		Arango 57' (pen.)	Stadium: Estadio Nacional; Attendance: 55,000; Referee: Ronald Lynch (England)

31 March 1957 South American Championship	Brazil	1–0	Peru	Lima
	Didì 73' (pen.)			Stadium: Estadio Nacional; Attendance: 55,000; Referee: Ronald Lynch (England)

6 April 1957 South American Championship	Peru	2–1	Argentina	Lima
	Mosquera 15'; Terry 81'		Sívori 50'	Stadium: Estadio Nacional; Attendance: 60,000; Referee: Bertley Cross (England)

9 April Friendly	Peru	1–4	Argentina	Lima
	Minaya 85'	Report	Angelillo 15'; Juárez 55'; Castro 70'; J. Broockers 76'	Stadium: Estadio Nacional; Referee: Diego De Leo (Italia)

13 April 1958 FIFA World Cup qualification	Peru	1–1	Brazil	Lima
	Terry 38'	Report	Índio 47'	Stadium: Estadio Nacional; Attendance: 50,000; Referee: Washington Rodriguez (Uruguay)

21 April 1958 FIFA World Cup qualification	Brazil	1–0	Peru	Rio de Janeiro
	Didi 11'	Report		Stadium: Maracanã Stadium; Attendance: 82,624; Referee: Esteban Marino (Uruguay)

=== 1959 ===
10 March 1959 South American Championship (Argentina)	Brazil	2–2	Peru	Buenos Aires
	Didi 24'; Pelé 48'		Seminario 59', 77'	Stadium: Estadio Monumental; Attendance: 45,000; Referee: Carlos Robles (Chile)

14 March 1959 South American Championship (Argentina)	Peru	5–3	Uruguay	Buenos Aires
	Loayza 4', 27', 42'; Joya 29', 79'		Demarco 2'; Douksas 31'; Sasía 81'	Stadium: Estadio Monumental; Attendance: 40,000; Referee: Carlos Robles (Chile)

18 March 1959 South American Championship (Argentina)	Argentina	3–1	Peru	Buenos Aires
	Corbatta 18' (pen.); Sosa 42'; Benítez 78' (o.g.)		Loayza 51'	Stadium: Estadio Monumental; Attendance: 70,000; Referee: Alberto Da Gama Malcher (Brazil)

21 March 1959 South American Championship (Argentina)	Chile	1–1	Peru	Buenos Aires
	Tobar 77'		Loayza 12'	Stadium: Estadio Monumental; Attendance: 50,000; Referee: Washington Rodríguez (Uruguay)

29 March 1959 South American Championship (Argentina)	Peru	0–0	Bolivia	Buenos Aires
				Stadium: Estadio Monumental; Attendance: 40,000; Referee: Washington Rodríguez (Uruguay)

2 April 1959 South American Championship (Argentina)	Paraguay	2–1	Peru	Buenos Aires
	Aveiro 32', 68'		Gómez Sánchez 51'	Stadium: Estadio Monumental; Attendance: 5,000; Referee: Alberto Da Gama Malcher (Brazil)

17 May Friendly	Peru	4–1	England	Lima
15:45 UTC−5	Seminario 10', 39', 80'; Joya 69'	Report	Greaves 60'	Stadium: Estadio Nacional; Attendance: 50,306; Referee: Erwin Hieger (Austria)

=== 1960 ===
10 July Friendly	Peru	1–3	Spain	Lima
	Carrasco 82'	Report	Di Stefano 19'; Suárez 44', 59'	Stadium: Estadio Nacional; Referee: Carlos Robles (Chile)

=== 1961 ===
19 March Friendly	Chile	5–2	Peru	Santiago
16:00 UTC−4	Toro 40'; Betta 69'; Soto 75'; Sánchez 82', 85'	Report	Flores 29'; Carrasco 30'	Stadium: Estadio Nacional; Attendance: 24,735; Referee: Juan Regis Brozzi (Argentina)

30 April 1962 FIFA World Cup qualification	Colombia	1–0	Peru	Bogotá
	Escobar 27'	Report		Stadium: Estadio El Campín; Attendance: 26,000; Referee: Jorge Luis Praddaude (Argentina)

7 May 1962 FIFA World Cup qualification	Peru	1–1	Colombia	Lima
	Delgado 3' (pen.)	Report	González 68'	Stadium: Estadio Nacional; Attendance: 50,579; Referee: Esteban Marino (Uruguay)

=== 1962 ===
20 May Friendly	Peru	0–4	England	Lima
		Report	Flowers 15' (pen.); Greaves 25', 39', 41'	Stadium: Estadio Nacional; Attendance: 32,565; Referee: Erwin Hieger (Austria)

=== 1963 ===
10 March 1963 South American Championship	Brazil	1–0	Peru	Cochabamba
	Flávio 16'			Stadium: Félix Capriles; Attendance: 18,000; Referee: José Dimas Larrosa (Paraguay)

13 March 1963 South American Championship	Peru	2–1	Argentina	Cochabamba
	Tenemás 62'; Gallardo 76'		Zárate 57'	Stadium: Félix Capriles; Attendance: 10,000; Referee: José Dimas Larrosa (Paraguay)

17 March 1963 South American Championship	Peru	2–1	Ecuador	La Paz
	León 34'; Mosquera 43'		Raffo 20'	Stadium: Hernando Siles; Attendance: 8,000; Referee: Ovidio Orrego (Colombia)

21 March 1963 South American Championship	Bolivia	3–2	Peru	La Paz
	Camacho 14'; Alcócer 49'; García 57'		Gallardo 40'; León 80'	Stadium: Hernando Siles; Attendance: 20,000; Referee: João Etzel Filho (Brazil)

24 March 1963 South American Championship	Peru	1–1	Colombia	La Paz
	Gallardo 25'		González 33'	Stadium: Hernando Siles; Attendance: 10,000; Referee: Luis Ventre (Argentina)

27 March 1963 South American Championship	Paraguay	4–1	Peru	Cochabamba
	Martínez 5', 25'; Cabrera 45'; Zárate 77'		Gallardo 70'	Stadium: Félix Capriles; Attendance: 20,000; Referee: Luis Ventre (Argentina)

=== 1965 ===
3 April Friendly	Peru	0–1	Paraguay	Lima
		Report	Riquelme 10'	Stadium: Estadio Nacional; Referee: Arturo Yamasaki (Peru)

15 April Copa del Pacífico	Chile	4–1	Peru	Santiago
	Landa 11' (pen.), 18'; Araya 20', 76'	Report	Zegarra 8'	Stadium: Estadio Nacional; Attendance: 47,589; Referee: Claudio Vicuña (Chile)

28 April Copa del Pacífico	Peru	0–1	Chile	Lima
		Report	Araya 54'	Stadium: Estadio Nacional; Referee: Arturo Yamasaki (Peru)

16 May 1966 FIFA World Cup qualification	Peru	1–0	Venezuela	Lima
	Zegarra 37' (pen.)	Report		Stadium: Estadio Nacional; Attendance: 43,990; Referee: Adolfo Reginato (Chile)

2 June 1966 FIFA World Cup qualification	Venezuela	3–6	Peru	Caracas
	Santana 32'; Ravelo 46'; Elie 89'	Report	Mosquera 11'; León 44', 60', 68'; Zavala 40', 81'	Stadium: Estadio Olímpico; Attendance: 6,245; Referee: José Antonio Sundheim (Colombia)

6 June 1966 FIFA World Cup qualification	Peru	0–1	Uruguay	Lima
		Report	Urruzmendi 77'	Stadium: Estadio Nacional; Attendance: 44,033; Referee: Claudio Vicuña (Chile)

13 June 1966 FIFA World Cup qualification	Uruguay	2–1	Peru	Montevideo
	Silva 20'; Rocha 62'	Report	Uribe 2'	Stadium: Estadio Centenario; Attendance: 58,413; Referee: Armando Marques (Brazil)

=== 1966 ===
4 June Friendly	Brazil	4–0	Peru	São Paulo
	Lima 18', 70'; Pelé 29'; Paraná 60'	Report		Stadium: Estádio do Morumbi; Attendance: 16,000; Referee: Archie Webster (Scotland)

8 June Friendly	Brazil	3–1	Peru	Rio de Janeiro
	Fidélis 10'; Tostão 17'; Edu 80'	Report	Herrera 65'	Stadium: Maracanã Stadium; Referee: William Syme (Scotland)

=== 1967 ===
28 July Friendly	Peru	0–1	Uruguay	Lima
		Report	Rocha 71'	Stadium: Estadio Nacional; Referee: Erwin Hieger (Austria)

28 July Friendly	Peru	1–0	Japan	Lima
	Gonzales 31'	Report		Stadium: Estadio Nacional; Referee: Arturo Yamasaki (Peru)

30 July Friendly	Peru	1–2	Uruguay	Lima
	Uribe 14'	Report	Rocha 20'; Bareño 57'	Stadium: Estadio Nacional; Referee: Erwin Hieger (Austria)

30 July Friendly	Peru	0–0	Japan	Lima
		Report		Stadium: Estadio Nacional

=== 1968 ===
14 July Taça Jorge Chávez/Santos Dumont	Peru	3–4	Brazil	Lima
	León 33', 38'; Zegarra 64'	Report	Natal 44'; Miranda; Jairzinho 87'; Carlos Alberto 89'	Stadium: Estadio Nacional; Referee: Miguel Comesaña (Argentina)

17 July Taça Jorge Chávez/Santos Dumont	Peru	0–4	Brazil	Lima
		Report	Rivellino 10'; Gérson 35'; Tostão 36'; Jairzinho 51'	Stadium: Estadio Nacional; Referee: Miguel Comesaña (Argentina)

18 August Copa del Pacífico	Peru	1–2	Chile	Lima
	Bailetti 67'	Report	Valdés 31', 34'	Stadium: Estadio Nacional; Referee: César Orozco (Peru)

21 August Copa del Pacífico	Peru	0–0	Chile	Lima
		Report		Stadium: Estadio Nacional; Referee: Erwin Hieger (Austria)

29 August Friendly	Peru	2–2	Argentina	Lima
	Casaretto 40', 63'	Report	Yazalde 30'; Savoy 65'	Stadium: Estadio Nacional; Referee: Erwin Hieger (Austria)

1 September Friendly	Peru	1–1	Argentina	Lima
	Casaretto 23'	Report	Veglio 28'	Stadium: Estadio Nacional; Referee: José Verrone (Venezuela)

20 October Friendly	Peru	3–3	Mexico	Lima
	Casaretto 8', 26', 32'	Report	Borja 49'; Peña 64'; Cisneros 83'	Stadium: Estadio Nacional; Referee: Alberto Tejada (Peru)

=== 1969 ===
7 April Friendly	Brazil	2–1	Peru	Porto Alegre
	Jairzinho 3'; Gérson 29'	Report	Gallardo 9'	Stadium: Estádio Beira-Rio; Referee: Alberto Tejada (Peru)

9 April Friendly	Brazil	3–2	Peru	Rio de Janeiro
	Pelé 9'; Tostão 35'; Edu 75'	Report	Gallardo 4'; Baylón 8'	Stadium: Maracanã Stadium; Attendance: 80,302; Referee: Alberto Tejada (Peru)

8 May Friendly	Colombia	1–3	Peru	Bogotá
	González 75'	Report	Ramírez 37'; Cubillas 55'; León 88'	Attendance: 23,000; Referee: Mario Canessa (Chile)

14 May Friendly	El Salvador	1–4	Peru	San Salvador
	Jorge Rodriguez 16'	Report	Castro 27' (o.g.); Ramírez 38', 72'; Castañeda 70'

20 May Friendly	Mexico	0–1	Peru	Mexico City
		Report	León 79'	Stadium: Estadio Azteca; Referee: Carlos Robles (Chile)

22 May Friendly	Mexico	3–0	Peru	León
	Borja 24', 26'; Bustos 35'	Report		Stadium: Estadio León; Referee: Carlos Robles (Chile)

18 June Friendly	Peru	1–1	Colombia	Lima
	Chumpitaz 78'	Report	Gallego 29'	Referee: Erwin Hieger (Austria)

27 June Friendly	Peru	1–0	Uruguay	Lima
	León 83'	Report		Stadium: Estadio Nacional; Referee: Erwin Hieger (Austria)

9 July Friendly	Peru	2–1	Paraguay	Lima
	Cubillas 42', 50'	Report	Mora 26'	Attendance: 30,000; Referee: Enrique Montes (Peru)

18 July Friendly	Peru	2–1	Paraguay	Lima
	Rojas 7' (o.g.); León 75'	Report	Sosa 85'

3 August 1970 FIFA World Cup qualification	Peru	1–0	Argentina	Lima
	León 52'			Stadium: Estadio Nacional; Attendance: 43,147; Referee: Ayrton Vieira de Moraes (Brazil)

10 August 1970 FIFA World Cup qualification	Bolivia	2–1	Peru	La Paz
	Díaz 69'; Chumpitaz 80' (o.g.)		Chale 51'	Stadium: Estadio Hernando Siles; Attendance: 20,670; Referee: Sergio Chechelev (Venezuela)

17 August 1970 FIFA World Cup qualification	Peru	3–0	Bolivia	Lima
	Cubillas 36'; Cruzado 40'; Gallardo 58'			Stadium: Estadio Nacional; Attendance: 43,148; Referee: Guillermo Velásquez (Colombia)

31 August 1970 FIFA World Cup qualification	Argentina	2–2	Peru	Buenos Aires
	Albrecht 80' (pen.); Rendo 90'		Ramírez 64', 81'	Stadium: La Bombonera; Attendance: 53,627; Referee: Rafael Hormazábal (Chile)

=== 1970 ===
4 February Friendly	Peru	0–2	Czech Republic	Lima
		Report	Stratil 38'; Smetana 44'	Stadium: Estadio Nacional; Referee: Alberto Tejada (Peru)

7 February Friendly	Peru	2–1	Czech Republic	Lima
	Sotil 29'; Cubillas 57'	Report	Gonzales 47' (o.g.)	Stadium: Estadio Nacional; Referee: Erwin Hieger (Austria)

9 February Friendly	Peru	1–1	Romania	Lima
	Cubillas 56'	Report	Lucescu 27'	Stadium: Estadio Nacional; Referee: César Orosco (Peru)

14 February Friendly	Peru	0–0	Soviet Union	Lima
		Report		Stadium: Estadio Nacional; Attendance: 42,000; Referee: Alberto Tejada (Peru)

20 February Friendly	Peru	0–2	Soviet Union	Lima
		Report	Byshovets 75', 79'	Stadium: Estadio Nacional; Attendance: 27,000; Referee: César Orosco (Peru)

21 February Friendly	Peru	1–3	Bulgaria	Lima
	Sotil 28'	Report	Nikodimov 54'; Marashliev 57'; Mihaylov 58'	Stadium: Estadio Nacional; Attendance: 27,000; Referee: Carlos Rivero (Peru)

24 February Friendly	Peru	5–3	Bulgaria	Lima
	Sotil 55', 84', 88'; Chale 63'; Cubillas 82'	Report	Dermendzhiev 18'; Asparuhov 68', 70'	Stadium: Estadio Nacional; Attendance: 30,000; Referee: Erwin Hieger (Austria)

5 March Friendly	Peru	0–1	Mexico	Lima
		Report	Basaguren 15'	Stadium: Estadio Nacional; Attendance: 40,000; Referee: Erwin Hieger (Austria)

8 March Friendly	Peru	1–0	Mexico	Lima
	Gallardo 63'	Report		Stadium: Estadio Nacional; Attendance: 35,000; Referee: Alberto Tejada (Peru)

15 March Friendly	Mexico	3–1	Peru	Mexico City
	Padilla 38'; Onofre 43'; López 83'	Report	Chale 40'	Stadium: Estadio Azteca; Attendance: 60,000; Referee: Diego Di Leo (Italy)

18 March Friendly	Mexico	3–3	Peru	León
	Borja 32'; López 40'; Hernández 60'	Report	León 17', 80'; Baylón 51'	Stadium: Estadio León; Referee: Abel Aguilar Elizalde (Mexico)

31 March Friendly	Uruguay	2–0	Peru	Montevideo
	Cubilla 27', 40'			Stadium: Estadio Centenario; Attendance: 45,000; Referee: Pablo Vaga (Uruguay)

21 April Friendly	Peru	3–0	El Salvador	Lima
	Gallardo 48'; Sotil 55'; del Castillo 79'			Attendance: 20,000; Referee: Carlos Orosco (Peru)

2 June 1970 FIFA World Cup Group 4	Peru	3–2	Bulgaria	León
16:00	Gallardo 50'; Chumpitaz 55'; Cubillas 73'	Report	Dermendzhiev 13'; Bonev 49'	Stadium: Estadio León; Attendance: 13,765; Referee: Antonio Sbardella (Italy)

6 June 1970 FIFA World Cup Group 4	Peru	3–0	Morocco	León
16:00	Cubillas 65', 75'; Chale 67'	Report		Stadium: Estadio León; Attendance: 13,537; Referee: Tofiq Bahramov (Soviet Union)

10 June 1970 FIFA World Cup Group 4	West Germany	3–1	Peru	León
16:00	Müller 19', 26', 39'	Report	Cubillas 44'	Stadium: Estadio León; Attendance: 17,875; Referee: Abel Aguilar Elizalde (Mexico)

14 June 1970 FIFA World Cup - Quarter-finals	Brazil	4–2	Peru	Guadalajara
12:00	Rivellino 11'; Tostão 15', 52'; Jairzinho 75'	Report	Gallardo 28'; Cubillas 70'	Stadium: Estadio Jalisco; Attendance: 54,233; Referee: Vital Loraux (Belgium)

=== 1971 ===
27 July Friendly	Peru	0–0	Paraguay	Lima
		Report		Attendance: 40,000; Referee: Edison Pérez Núñez (Peru)

11 August Copa del Pacífico	Peru	1–0	Chile	Lima
	Sotil 86'	Report		Stadium: Estadio Nacional; Referee: Alberto Tejada (Peru)

15 August Friendly	Paraguay	2–0	Peru	Asunción
	Arrúa 69', 80'	Report		Referee: José Romei (Paraguay)

18 August Copa del Pacífico	Chile	1–0	Peru	Santiago
	Viveros 84'	Report		Stadium: Estadio Nacional; Attendance: 18,446; Referee: Jaime Amor (Chile)

=== 1972 ===
29 March Friendly	Colombia	1–1	Peru	Bogotá
	Morón 16'	Report	Muñante 68'	Referee: Omar Delgado (Colombia)

5 April Friendly	Mexico	2–1	Peru	Mexico City
	Muciño 51'; Borja 60'	Report	Cubillas 39'	Stadium: Estadio Azteca; Referee: Javier Galindo (Mexico)

19 April Friendly	Soviet Union	2–0	Peru	Kyiv
	Banishevskiy 13'; Konkov 18'	Report		Stadium: Central Stadium; Attendance: 46,000; Referee: Wolfgang Riedel (East Germany)

23 April Friendly	Romania	2–2	Peru	Bucharest
	Tătaru 65' (pen.); Marcu 75'	Report	Rojas 20'; Cubillas 61'	Stadium: Stadionul Republicii; Attendance: 6,000; Referee: Nicolaos Zlatanos (Greece)

26 April Friendly	Scotland	2–0	Peru	Glasgow
	O'Hare 48'; Law 65'	Report		Stadium: Hampden Park; Attendance: 21,000; Referee: Pat Partridge (England)

3 May Friendly	Netherlands	3–0	Peru	Rotterdam
	Klijnjan 20' (pen.); van Hanegem 32'; Schneider 83' (pen.)	Report		Stadium: De Kuip; Attendance: 22,000; Referee: Mario Clematide (Switzerland)

6 June Friendly	Peru	0–0	Colombia	Lima
		Report		Stadium: Estadio Nacional; Referee: Edison Pérez Núñez (Peru)

11 June Brazil Independence Cup	Peru	3–0	Bolivia	Curitiba
	Gallardo 7' (pen.); Castañeda 16'; Sotil 31'	Report		Stadium: Estádio Couto Pereira; Referee: Edwin Keith Walker (England)

14 June Brazil Independence Cup	Paraguay	1–0	Peru	Campo Grande
	Godoy 89'	Report		Stadium: Morenão; Referee: Abraham Klein (Israel)

18 June Brazil Independence Cup	Peru	1–0	Venezuela	Manaus
	Ramírez 65'	Report		Stadium: Vivaldão; Referee: Arnaldo Cézar Coelho (Brazil)

25 June Brazil Independence Cup	Yugoslavia	2–1	Peru	Manaus
	Bajević 4', 37'	Report	Ramírez 11'	Stadium: Vivaldão; Attendance: 20,000; Referee: Alfonso González Archundía (Mexico)

9 August Friendly	Peru	3–2	Mexico	Lima
	Muñante 35'; Fernández 41', 75'	Report	Borja 25'; Pulido 40'	Stadium: Estadio Nacional; Attendance: 45,000; Referee: Carlos Rivero (Peru)

25 October Copa Ramón Castilla	Peru	0–2	Argentina	Lima
		Report	Ayala 13', 40'	Stadium: Estadio Nacional; Referee: Carlos Rivero (Peru)

=== 1973 ===
4 March Friendly	Peru	5–1	Guatemala	Lima
	Cubillas 23', 32'; Muñante 50', 70'; Sotil 60'	Report	Estrada 81'	Stadium: Estadio Nacional; Referee: Pedro Reyes (Peru)

24 March Copa Mariscal Sucre	Peru	2–0	Bolivia	Lima
	Iriondo 20' (o.g.); Sotil 35'	Report		Referee: Pedro Reyes (Peru)

28 March Friendly	Peru	1–0	Paraguay	Lima
	Sotil 40'	Report		Referee: Carlos Rivero (Peru)

8 April Friendly	Paraguay	1–1	Peru	Asunción
	Maldonado 41'	Report	Cubillas 88'	Referee: José Dimas La Rosa (Paraguay)

23 April Friendly	Peru	4–0	Panama	Lima
	Cubillas 16'; Muñante 26'; Ramírez 56'; Mayorga 65'	Report		Stadium: Estadio Nacional; Referee: Enrique Labo Revoredo (Peru)

29 April 1974 FIFA World Cup qualification	Peru	2–0	Chile	Lima
	Sotil 43', 62'	Report		Stadium: Estadio Nacional; Attendance: 44,438; Referee: Armando Nunes (Brazil)

13 May 1974 FIFA World Cup qualification	Chile	2–0	Peru	Santiago
	Crisosto 68'; Ahumada 71'	Report		Stadium: Estadio Nacional; Attendance: 69,881; Referee: Ramón Barreto (Uruguay)

1 July Friendly	Peru	3–1	Colombia	Lima
	Bailetti 31', 49'; Ramírez 68'	Report	Morón 90'	Stadium: Estadio Nacional; Referee: Enrique Labo Revoredo (Peru)

15 July Copa Mariscal Sucre	Bolivia	2–0	Peru	La Paz
	Messa 71', 73'	Report		Stadium: Estadio Hernando Siles; Referee: Oscar Ortube (Bolivia)

27 July Copa Ramón Castilla	Argentina	3–1	Peru	Buenos Aires
	Guerini 38', 55'; Brindisi 60' (pen.)	Report	Bailetti 42'	Stadium: La Bombonera; Referee: Arturo Ithurralde (Argentina)

5 August 1974 FIFA World Cup qualification	Chile	2–1	Peru	Montevideo
	Valdés 45'; Farias 58'	Report	Bailetti 40'	Stadium: Estadio Centenario; Attendance: 57,933; Referee: Luis da Rosa (Uruguay)

=== 1975 ===
22 June Friendly	Ecuador	6–0	Peru	Quito
	Paz 15', 47'; Castañeda 33'; Lasso 35'; Carrera 55', 71'	Report		Stadium: Estadio Olímpico Atahuapa; Referee: René Torres (Ecuador)

25 June Friendly	Ecuador	1–0	Peru	Guayaquil
	Ron 80'	Report		Referee: Eduardo Rendón (Ecuador)

1 July Friendly	Peru	2–0	Ecuador	Lima
	Oblitas 14'; Díaz 76'	Report		Referee: Carlos Rivero (Peru)

10 July Friendly	Peru	2–0	Paraguay	Lima
	Ramírez 13', 26'	Report		Referee: Enrique Labo Revoredo (Peru)

17 July 1975 Copa América	Chile	1–1	Peru	Santiago
	Crisosto 10'	Report	Rojas 72'	Stadium: Estadio Nacional; Attendance: 13,651; Referee: Omar Delgado (Colombia)

27 July 1975 Copa América	Bolivia	0–1	Peru	Oruro
		Report	Ramírez 17'	Stadium: Estadio Jesús Bermúdez; Attendance: 18,000; Referee: Alberto Ducatelli (Argentina)

7 August 1975 Copa América	Peru	3–1	Bolivia	Lima
	Ramírez 7' (pen.); Cueto 26'; Oblitas 52'	Report	Mezza 58' (pen.)	Stadium: Estadio Nacional; Attendance: 40,000; Referee: Romualdo Arppi Filho (Brazil)

20 August 1975 Copa América	Peru	3–1	Chile	Lima
	Rojas 3'; Oblitas 32'; Cubillas 39'	Report	Reinoso 76'	Stadium: Estadio Alejandro Villanueva; Attendance: 40,000; Referee: Juan José Fortunatto (Uruguay)

30 September 1975 Copa America - Semi-finals	Brazil	1–3	Peru	Belo Horizonte
	Batata 54'	Report	Casaretto 19', 88'; Cubillas 82'	Stadium: Estádio Mineirão; Attendance: 40,000; Referee: Miguel Angel Comesaña (Argentina)

4 October 1975 Copa America - Semi-finals	Peru	0–2	Brazil	Lima
		Report	Meléndez 10' (o.g.); Campos 61'	Stadium: Estadio Alejandro Villanueva; Attendance: 55,000; Referee: Arturo Ithurralde (Argentina)

16 October 1975 Copa América finals	Colombia	1–0	Peru	Bogotá
	Castro 38'	Report		Stadium: Estadio El Campín; Attendance: 50,000; Referee: Miguel Comesaña (Argentina)

22 October 1975 Copa América finals	Peru	2–0	Colombia	Lima
	Oblitas 18'; Ramírez 44'	Report		Stadium: Estadio Nacional; Attendance: 50,000; Referee: Juan Silvagno (Chile)

28 October 1975 Copa América finals	Peru	1–0	Colombia	Caracas
	Sotil 25'	Report		Stadium: Estadio Olímpico; Attendance: 30,000; Referee: Ramón Barreto (Uruguay)

=== 1976 ===
12 October Friendly	Peru	0–0	Uruguay	Lima
		Report		Stadium: Estadio Nacional; Referee: César Pagano (Peru)

28 October Copa Ramón Castilla	Peru	1–3	Argentina	Lima
	Quesada 58'	Report	Houseman 48'; Passarella 76'; Quesada 90' (o.g.)	Stadium: Estadio Nacional; Referee: José Ramírez (Peru)

10 November Copa Ramón Castilla	Argentina	1–0	Peru	Buenos Aires
	Passarella 62'	Report		Stadium: Estadio José Amalfitani; Referee: Jorge Eduardo Romero (Argentina)

24 November Friendly	Uruguay	0–0	Peru	Montevideo
		Report		Stadium: Estadio Centenario; Referee: Roque Cerullo (Uruguay)

=== 1977 ===
9 February Friendly	Peru	3–2	Hungary	Lima
	Velásquez 35', 42'; Sotil 87'	Report	Törőcsik 26'; Kereki 89'	Stadium: Estadio Nacional; Attendance: 50,000; Referee: Edison Pérez Núñez (Peru)

20 February 1978 FIFA World Cup qualification	Ecuador	1–1	Peru	Quito
	Paz 81'	Report	Oblitas 43'	Stadium: Estadio Olímpico Atahualpa; Attendance: 39,576; Referee: Agomar Röhrig (Brazil)

6 March 1978 FIFA World Cup qualification	Chile	1–1	Peru	Santiago
	Ahumada 42'	Report	Muñante 70'	Stadium: Estadio Nacional; Attendance: 67,983; Referee: José Faville Neto (Brazil)

12 March 1978 FIFA World Cup qualification	Peru	4–0	Ecuador	Lima
	José Velásquez 19'; Oblitas 48', 50'; Luces 63'	Report		Stadium: Estadio Nacional; Attendance: 43,319; Referee: Luis Barrancos (Bolivia)

26 March 1978 FIFA World Cup qualification	Peru	2–0	Chile	Lima
	Sotil 49'; Oblitas 54'	Report		Stadium: Estadio Nacional; Attendance: 62,000; Referee: Arnaldo Cézar Coelho (Brazil)

17 May Friendly	Mexico	1–1	Peru	Mexico City
	Real 6'	Report	Ramírez 30'	Stadium: Estadio Azteca; Referee: Javier Galindo (Mexico)

24 May Friendly	Mexico	2–1	Peru	Monterrey
	Vásquez 34'; Aceves 81'	Report	Real 51' (o.g.)	Stadium: Estadio Universitario; Referee: Enrique Mendoza Guillén (Mexico)

26 May Friendly	Haiti	1–2	Peru	Port-au-Prince
	Romulas 45'	Report	Sotil 37'; Luces 65'

29 May Friendly	Haiti	2–2	Peru	Port-au-Prince
	Domingue 34' (pen.); Vorbe 48'	Report	Velásquez 68'; Ramírez 73' (pen.)

10 June Friendly	Peru	1–3	Poland	Lima
	Luces 62'	Report	Szamach 15'; Deyna 19'; Kasperczak 63'	Stadium: Estadio Nacional; Attendance: 35,000; Referee: César Orosco (Peru

10 July 1978 FIFA World Cup qualification	Brazil	1–0	Peru	Cali
	Gil 53'	Report		Stadium: Pascual Guerrero; Attendance: 50,345; Referee: Miguel Ángel Comesaña (Argentina)

17 July 1978 FIFA World Cup qualification	Peru	5–0	Bolivia	Cali
	Cubillas 31', 44'; Velásquez 65', 89'; Rojas 74'	Report		Stadium: Pascual Guerrero; Attendance: 32,511; Referee: Ramón Barreto (Uruguay)

=== 1978 ===
19 March Copa Ramón Castilla	Argentina	2–1	Peru	Mar del Plata
	Houseman 40'; Pagnanini 68'	Report	Rojas 89'	Referee: Ramón Barreto (Uruguay)

23 March Copa Ramón Castilla	Peru	1–3	Argentina	Lima
	Oblitas 53'	Report	Luque 7'; Passarella 25' (pen.); Houseman 30'	Referee: Edison Pérez Núñez (Peru)

1 April Friendly	Peru	1–1	Bulgaria	Lima
	Ramírez 62'	Report	Manolov 25'	Stadium: Estadio Nacional; Attendance: 30,000; Referee: César Pagano (Peru)

11 April Friendly	Peru	1–0	Mexico	Los Angeles
	Gorriti 74'	Report		Stadium: Memorial Coliseum; Attendance: 38,016

22 April Friendly	Peru	2–1	China	Lima
	Mosquera 25'; Rojas 64'	Report	Chi Shangbin 53'	Stadium: Estadio Nacional; Referee: César Pagano (Peru)

1 May Friendly	Brazil	3–0	Peru	Rio de Janeiro
	Zico 34'; Reinaldo 61', 85'	Report		Stadium: Maracanã Stadium; Attendance: 145,200; Referee: Roque Cerullo (Uruguay)

3 June 1978 FIFA World Cup Group 4	Peru	3–1	Scotland	Córdoba
16:45 UTC−3	Cueto 43'; Cubillas 71', 77'	Report	Jordan 14'	Stadium: Estadio Chateau Carreras; Attendance: 46,792; Referee: Ulf Eriksson (Sweden)

7 June 1978 FIFA World Cup Group 4	Netherlands	0–0	Peru	Mendoza
16:45 UTC−3		Report		Stadium: Estadio Ciudad de Mendoza; Attendance: 28,000; Referee: Adolf Prokop (East Germany)

11 June 1978 FIFA World Cup Group 4	Peru	4–1	Iran	Córdoba
16:45 UTC−3	Velásquez 2'; Cubillas 36' (pen.), 39' (pen.), 79'	Report	Rowshan 41'	Stadium: Estadio Chateau Carreras; Attendance: 27,000; Referee: Alojzy Jarguz (Poland)

14 June 1978 FIFA World Cup Group B	Brazil	3–0	Peru	Mendoza
16:45 UTC−3	Dirceu 15', 27'; Zico 72' (pen.)	Report		Stadium: Estadio Ciudad de Mendoza; Attendance: 38,000; Referee: Nicolae Rainea (Romania)

18 June 1978 FIFA World Cup Group B	Peru	0–1	Poland	Mendoza
13:45 UTC−3		Report	Szarmach 65'	Stadium: Estadio Ciudad de Mendoza; Attendance: 38,000; Referee: Pat Partridge (England)

21 June 1978 FIFA World Cup Group B	Argentina	6–0	Peru	Rosario
19:15 UTC−3	Kempes 21', 49'; Tarantini 43'; Luque 50', 72'; Houseman 67'	Report		Stadium: Estadio Gigante de Arroyito; Attendance: 40,600; Referee: Robert Wurtz (France)

=== 1979 ===
11 July Friendly	Peru	2–1	Ecuador	Lima
	Oré 18'; Mosquera 30'	Report	Mantilla 50'	Referee: Carlos Montalvan (Peru)

18 July Friendly	Peru	0–1	Colombia	Lima
		Report	Ortiz 10'	Referee: Edison Pérez Núñez (Peru)

25 July Friendly	Colombia	1–2	Peru	Bogotá
	Ortiz 35' (pen.)	Report	Duarte 44'; Cueto 46'	Stadium: Estadio El Campín; Referee: Guillermo Velásquez (Colombia)

8 August Friendly	Ecuador	2–1	Peru	Quito
	Alarcón 13'; Perlaza 60'	Report	Ravello 27'	Stadium: Estadio Olímpico Atahualpa; Referee: Adolfo Quirola (Ecuador)

30 August Friendly	Peru	2–0	Uruguay	Lima
	Mosquera 41'; Leguía 72'	Report		Stadium: Estadio Nacional; Attendance: 7,000; Referee: César Pagano (Peru)

12 September Friendly	Scotland	1–1	Peru	Glasgow
	Hartford 6'	Report	Leguía 85'	Stadium: Hampden Park; Attendance: 41,035; Referee: George Courtney (England)

10 October Friendly	Peru	2–3	Paraguay	Lima
	Chumpitaz 27'; Lobatón 68'	Report	Acosta 13'; Espínola 32' (pen.); Morel 65'	Stadium: Estadio Nacional; Referee: César Pagano (Peru)

17 October 1979 Copa América - Semi-finals	Peru	1–2	Chile	Lima
	Mosquera 71'	Report	Caszely 36', 76'	Stadium: Estadio Nacional; Attendance: 50,000; Referee: Romualdo Arppi Filho (Brazil)

24 October 1979 Copa América - Semi-finals	Chile	0–0	Peru	Santiago
		Report		Stadium: Estadio Nacional; Attendance: 75,681; Referee: Juan Daniel Cardellino (Uruguay)

1 November Friendly	Mexico	1–0	Peru	Monterrey
	Medina 26'	Report		Stadium: Estadio Universitario; Referee: Manuel Ceja (Mexico)

== See also ==
- Peru national football team results (1980–1999)
- Peru national football team results (2000–2019)
- Peru national football team results (2020–present)

== Notes ==
1. This is one of several goals for which the statistical details are disputed. The goalscorers and timings used here are those of FIFA, the official record. Some other sources, such as RSSSF, state a different scorer, timing, or both.
2. This is the biggest win ever recorded by the Peruvian team.
3. According to other sources, Jorge Alcalde scored both goals in the match.
4. Peru protested Paraguay's decision to field four players when the rules allowed for only three. Ultimately, Peru won the match by default.
