= 1970 Club Sporting Cristal season =

Sporting Cristal
1970 season
- Stadium: San Martín de Porres, Lima
- Torneo Descentralizado: First Stage: Third (3°); Liguilla Final: Champions (1°); Champions National (1°)
Home colours	Away colours	Third colours

The 1970 Sporting Cristal season was the Fifteenth (15.º) of the club from its foundation in 1955, Fifteen (15) consecutive participations in the top-flight of Peruvian Primera División (of 54 Editions) with denomination Torneo Descentralizado. In the Previous Season the club qualified as coming in 9th Place in the 1969 Torneo Descentralizado.

Sporting Cristal were one of fourteen (14) clubs in the Fifth edition (5.º) Torneo Descentralizado, the most important competition of the Peruvian football. The club played in the Peruvian Primera División. Sporting Cristal won their 4th Torneo Descentralizado Title.

== Squad ==
No.	Pos.	Nation	Player
—	GK	PER	Luis Rubiños
—	GK	PER	Rodolfo Bazán
—	GK	PER	Amado Tejada
—	DF	PER	Eloy Campos
—	DF	PER	Orlando de la Torre
—	DF	PER	Roberto Elías
—	DF	PER	Fernando Mellán
—	DF	PER	César Tagle
—	DF	PER	Héctor Revoredo
—	MF	PER	Víctor Fernández
—	MF	PER	Ramón Mifflin
—	MF	PER	Alfredo Quesada

No.	Pos.	Nation	Player
—	MF	PER	Roberto Chauca
—	MF	PER	José del Castillo
—	MF	PER	Jorge Charún
—	MF	PER	Hernán Cortez
—	FW	PER	Alberto Gallardo
—	MF	PER	Carlos Gonzales
—	FW	PER	Tadeo Risco
—	FW	PER	Mario Aquije
—	FW	PER	Bernabé Navarro
—	FW	PER	Próspero Merino
—	FW	PER	Alejandro Guzmán
—	FW	PER	Carlos Lizarzaburu

== Torneo Descentralizado ==
The points system during the season varied. In the first leg of the first phase—the first 13 rounds—2 points were awarded for a win, 1 point for a draw and no points for a loss; in the second leg of the first phase—the last 13 rounds—and in the second stage a win was awarded 4 points, a draw was awarded 2 points and no points were awarded for a loss.

=== First stage ===
Pos	Team	Pld	W	D	L	GF	GA	GD	Pts
2	Defensor Arica	26	13	7	6	38	26	+12	53
3	Sporting Cristal	26	13	8	5	44	25	+19	49
4	Juan Aurich	26	10	10	6	34	25	+9	45

== See also ==
- Club Sporting Cristal
- 1970 Torneo Descentralizado
