= Taça Jorge Chávez/Santos Dumont =

Taça Jorge Chavéz/Santos Dumont
- Event: Friendly match
Peru	Brazil
(Peru)	(Brazil)
0	4
- On points (3–8 on aggregate)

First leg
Peru	Brazil
3	4
- Date: 14 July 1968
- Venue: Estadio Nacional, Lima

Second leg
Brazil	Peru
4	0
- Date: 17 July 1968
- Venue: Estadio Nacional, Lima

The Taça Jorge Chavéz/Santos Dumont, was a friendly football match realized between Brazil and Peru, on July 14 and 17 of 1968. The series, played in a two-legged format at Estadio Nacional in Lima, was similar to others played at the time, such as the Copa Roca.

The name of the trophy was a tribute to Jorge Chávez Dartnell and Alberto Santos-Dumont, the two Brazilian pioneers of world aviation.

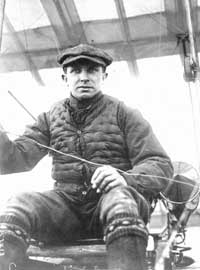
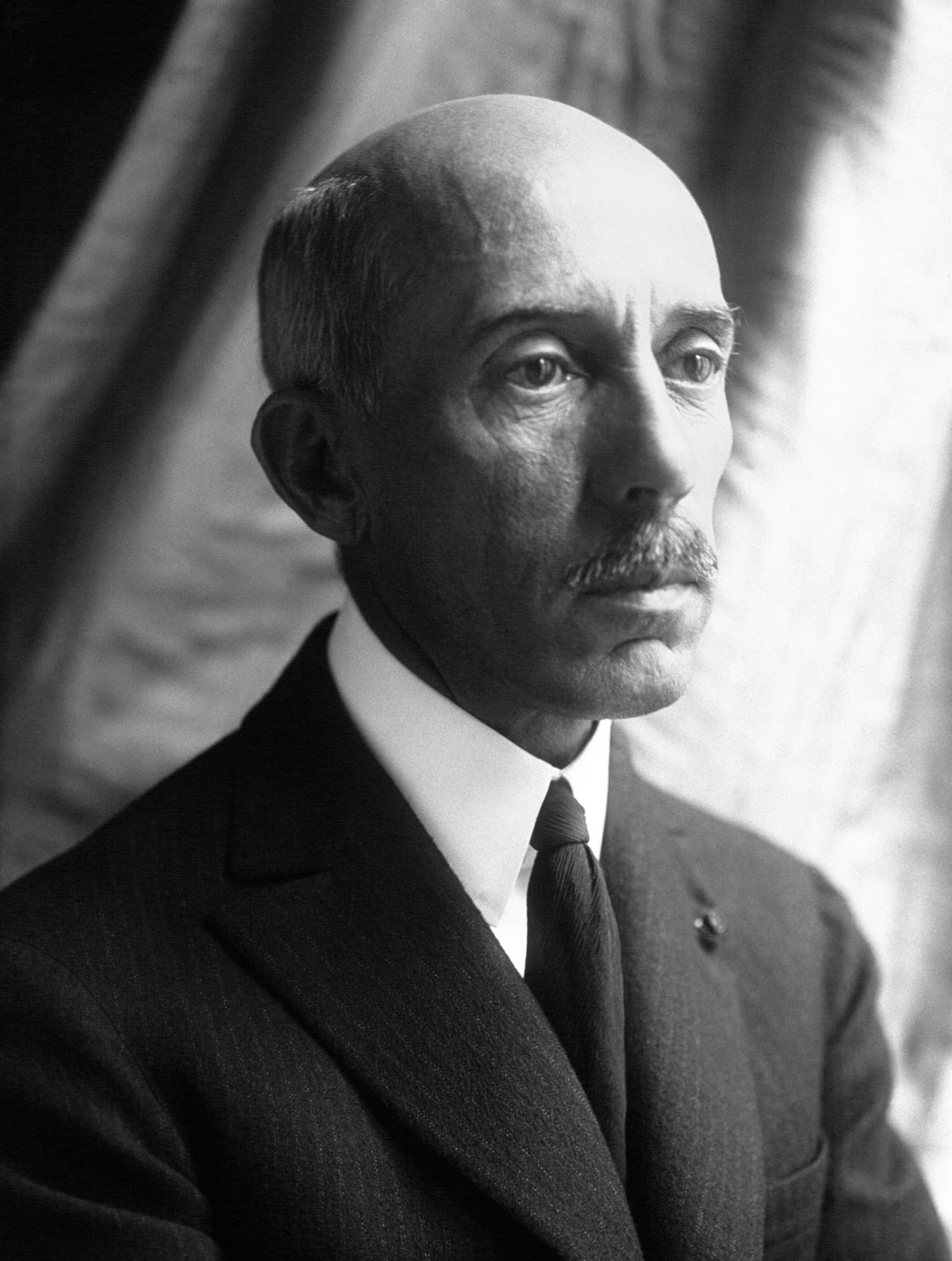
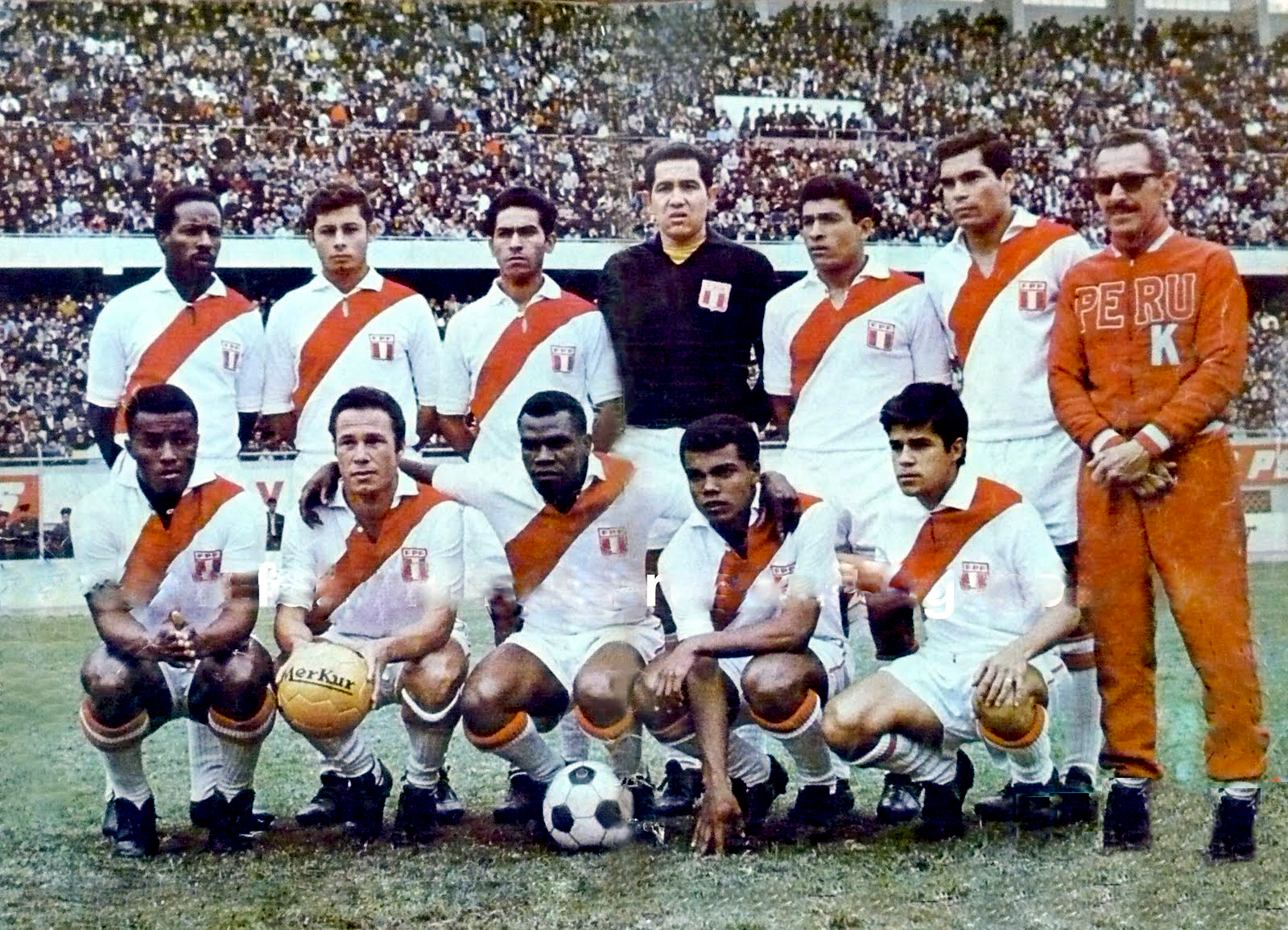
The trophy was named in honor of aviation pioneers Jorge Chávez Dartnell (left) and Alberto Santos-Dumont (center); At right, a Peru team of 1968

== Match details ==
=== First leg ===
July 14, 1968

Peru	3–4	Brazil
León 33', 38'; Zegarra 64'	Report	Natal 44'; Roberto Miranda 52'; Jairzinho 87'; Carlos Alberto 89'

Estadio Nacional, Lima
Referee: Miguel Ángel Comesaña (ARG)

Peru
Brazil

GK	Luis Rubiños	(substituted off) a'
DF	Eloy Campos
DF	Fernando Mellán
DF	Héctor Chumpitaz
DF	Roberto Elías
MF	Ramón Mifflin
MF	Roberto Challe
MF	Julio Baylón
FW	Víctor Zegarra
FW	Pedro Pablo León
FW	Alberto Gallardo
Substitutes:
GK	Román Villanueva	(substituted on) a'
Manager:
(Brazil) Didi

GK	1	Cláudio
DF	2	Carlos Alberto
DF	3	Brito
DF	6	Joel Camargo
DF	4	Sadi
MF	5	Gérson
MF	10	Rivellino
FW	7	Natal	(substituted off) a'
FW	8	Tostão
FW	9	Jairzinho
FW	11	Edu
Substitutes:
FW		Paulo Borges	(substituted on) a'
Manager:
(Brazil) Aymoré Moreira

=== Second leg ===
July 17, 1968

Peru	0–4	Brazil
	Report	Rivellino 10'; Gérson 35'; Tostão 36'; Jairzinho 51'

Estadio Nacional, Lima
Referee: Miguel Ángel Comesaña (ARG)

Peru
Brazil

GK	Román Villanueva
DF	Eloy Campos
DF	Fernando Mellán
DF	Héctor Chumpitaz
DF	Roberto Elías
MF	Ramón Mifflin
MF	Roberto Challe
MF	Julio Baylón
FW	Víctor Zegarra
FW	Pedro Pablo León
FW	Alberto Gallardo
Manager:
(Brazil) Didi

GK	1	Cláudio	(substituted off) a'
DF	2	Carlos Alberto
DF	3	Jurandir
DF	6	Joel Camargo	(substituted off) b'
DF	4	Sadi
MF	5	Gérson
MF	10	Rivellino
FW	7	Paulo Borges
FW	8	Tostão
FW	9	Jairzinho
FW	11	Edu
Substitutes:
GK	12	Félix	(substituted on) a'
DF		Marinho Peres	(substituted on) b'
Manager:
(Brazil) Aymoré Moreira
