= Copa del Pacífico =

South American association football tournament

- Organiser(s): Football Federation of Chile and Peruvian Football Federation
- Founded: 1953; 73 years ago
- Region: Chile; Peru
- Teams: 2
- Current champions: Chile (2012)
- Most championships: Chile (7 titles)

The Copa del Pacífico is a football competition contested in a friendly tournament between the national football teams of Chile and Peru. Created in July 1953, the Cup has been contested ten times, with Chile winning 7 titles and Peru 4 (the 1971 title was shared by both teams).

== Format ==
The tournament is played in a two-legged format, usually home and away. Except for the 1982 edition, which was a single match.

== History ==
The first edition in 1953 was won by Peru, over two matches – both played at the National Stadium in Lima – with Peru losing 1–2 in the first match and winning 5–0 in the second. This second match, played on July 28, 1953, is Peru's second-largest victory over Chile in the history of matches between the two countries. Peru repeated the feat in 1954. This time, both matches were played at the National Stadium in Santiago, and the Peruvians, who lost 1–2 in the first match, won the second 4–2. This second match, played on September 19, 1954, constituted Peru's first victory over its neighbor away from home.

Chile restored the balance by winning the next two editions of the Copa del Pacífico in the 1960s (1965-1968). In 1971, the two countries finished level (1–0 in the first leg and the same score in the second) and shared the title. In 1982, the tournament was exceptionally played as a single match at the National Stadium in Lima. Peru won this match, played on March 30, 1982, 1-0.

From 1983 onwards, Chile won the tournament every year, for four consecutive editions. In 2012, during the last edition, Chile notably won 3–0 at the Jorge Basadre Stadium in Tacna, Peru.

== List of champions ==
Year	Winners	1st. leg	2nd. leg	Agg	Runners-up	Venue (1st leg)	City (1st leg)	Venue (2nd leg)	City (2nd leg)
1953	Peru	1–2	5–0	6–2	Chile	Estadio Nacional	Lima	Estadio Nacional	Lima
1954	Peru	1–2	4–2	5–4	Chile	Estadio Nacional	Santiago	Estadio Nacional	Santiago
1965	Chile	4–1	1–0	5–1	Peru	Estadio Nacional	Santiago	Estadio Nacional	Lima
1968	Chile	2–1	0–0	2–1	Peru	Estadio Nacional	Lima	Estadio Nacional	Lima
1971	Peru Chile	1–0	0–1	1–1	—	Estadio Nacional	Lima	Estadio Nacional	Santiago
1982	Peru	1–0	—	1–0	Chile	Estadio Nacional	Lima	—	—
1983	Chile	1–0	2–0	3–0	Peru	Estadio Nacional	Lima	Estadio Carlos Dittborn	Arica
1988	Chile	2–0	1–1	3–1	Peru	Estadio Carlos Dittborn	Arica	Estadio Nacional	Lima
2006	Chile	3–2	1–0	4–2	Peru	Estadio Sausalito	Viña del Mar	Estadio Jorge Basadre	Tacna
2012	Chile	3–1	3–0	6–1	Peru	Estadio Carlos Dittborn	Arica	Estadio Jorge Basadre	Tacna

== Topscorers per tournament ==
Years	Top Scorers			
Years	Goals	Striker	National team	Ref.
1953	2 goals	Cornelio Heredia	Peru	
1954	3 goals	René Meléndez	Chile	
1965	3 goals	Pedro Araya	Chile	
1968	2 goals	Francisco Valdés	Chile	
1971	1 goal	Hugo Sotil; Gustavo Viveros	Peru; Chile	
1982	1 goal	Franco Navarro	Peru	
1983	2 goals	Juan Carlos Letelier	Chile	
1988	1 goal	Rubén Espinoza; Hugo González; Patricio Mardones; Domingo Farfán	Chile; Chile; Chile; Peru	
2006	2 goals	Matías Fernández; Reinaldo Navia	Chile; Chile	
2012	2 goals	Eugenio Mena	Chile	
