= 1966 FIFA World Cup qualification (CONMEBOL – Group 1) =

Group one of CONMEBOL 1966 FIFA World Cup Qualification

The three teams in this group played against each other on a home-and-away basis. Uruguay won the group and qualified for the 1966 FIFA World Cup, held in England.

== Standings ==
Pos	Team	Pld	W	D	L	GF	GA	GD	Pts	Qualification	(Uruguay national football team)	(Peru national football team)	(Venezuela national football team)
1	Uruguay	4	4	0	0	11	2	+9	8	Qualification for 1966 FIFA World Cup	—	2–1	5–0
2	Peru	4	2	0	2	8	6	+2	4		0–1	—	1–0
3	Venezuela	4	0	0	4	4	15	−11	0		1–3	3–6	—

Source: AllWorldCup
Rules for classification: Tiebreakers

== Matches ==
16 May 1965

Peru	1–0	Venezuela
Zegarra 37' (pen.)	Report

Lima, Peru
Attendance: 43,990
Referee: Adolfo Reginato (Chile)

23 May 1965

Uruguay	5–0	Venezuela
Rocha 18'; Silva 23', 52', 69'; Meneses 61'	Report

Montevideo, Uruguay
Attendance: 16,439
Referee: José Dimas Larrosa (Paraguay)

30 May 1965

Venezuela	1–3	Uruguay
Tortolero 40'	Report	Rocha 10', 47'; Silva 88'

Caracas, Venezuela
Attendance: 12,649
Referee: Roberto Goicoechea (Argentina)

2 June 1965

Venezuela	3–6	Peru
Santana 32'; Ravelo 46'; Elie 89'	Report	Mosquera 11'; León 44', 60', 68'; Zavala 40', 81'

Caracas, Venezuela
Attendance: 6,245
Referee: José Antonio Sundheim (Colombia)

6 June 1965

Peru	0–1	Uruguay
	Report	Urruzmendi 77'

Lima, Peru
Attendance: 44,033
Referee: Claudio Vicuña (Chile)

13 June 1965

Uruguay	2–1	Peru
Silva 20'; Rocha 62'	Report	Uribe 2'

Montevideo, Uruguay
Attendance: 58,413
Referee: Armando Marques (Brazil)

Uruguay qualified.

== Goalscorers ==
There were 23 goals scored in 6 matches, for an average of 3.83 goals per match. 4 goals

- (Uruguay) Pedro Rocha
- (Uruguay) Héctor Silva

3 goals

- (Peru) Pedro Pablo León

2 goals

- (Peru) Luis Zavala
- (Uruguay) José Urruzmendi

1 goal

- (Peru) Nemesio Mosquera
- (Peru) Ángel Uribe
- (Peru) Victor Zegarra
- (Uruguay) Danilo Meneses
- (Venezuela) Argenis Tortolero
- (Venezuela) Rafael Santana
- (Venezuela) José Ravelo
- (Venezuela) Freddy Elie
