= Luis Castro (footballer, born 1957) =

Chilean footballer

Personal information
- Full name: Luis Humberto Castro Dinamarca
- Date of birth: 21 September 1957 (age 69)
- Place of birth: Chile
- Position: Forward

Senior career*
Years	Team	Apps	(Gls)
1981–1984	Fernández Vial	63	(18)
1985–1987	Naval	59	(14)
1987–1988	Atlético Potosino		

International career
1985	Chile XI		
1985	Chile A-2	1	(0)
- * Club domestic league appearances and goals

Luis Humberto Castro Dinamarca (born 21 September 1957), also known by his nickname Cholo Castro, is a Chilean former footballer who played as a forward for clubs in Chile and Mexico.

== Career ==
In his homeland, Castro played for Fernández Vial and Naval in the Chilean top division. In addition, as a member of Fernández Vial, he won the league titles of both the Tercera División and the Segunda División in 1981 and 1982, respectively, and took part in the first Clásico Penquista against Deportes Concepción at professional level in 1982.

In 1987, he emigrated to Mexico and joined Atlético Potosino in the Mexican top division, where he coincided with his compatriots Nelson Sanhueza as fellow and Pedro Araya as coach. He scored two goals in the 1987–88 season.

At international level, Castro represented the Chile national B team and won the Indonesian Independence Cup in 1985, alongside players such as Oscar Wirth, Fernando Astengo, Carlos Poblete, among others. Subsequently, he made an appearance in the Los Angeles Nations Cup.

== Personal life ==
He made his home in Potosí, Mexico, and has taken part in local amateur championships of the Liga de Veteranos (Veteran League).

== Honours ==
Fernández Vial

- Tercera División de Chile: 1981
- Segunda División de Chile: 1982

Chile B

- Indonesian Independence Cup: 1985
