= Sadi Schwerdt =

Brazilian footballer

Sadi
Personal information
- Full name: Sadi Schwerdt
- Date of birth: 15 December 1942
- Place of birth: São Jerônimo, Brazil
- Date of death: 27 February 2019 (aged 76)
- Place of death: Porto Alegre, Brazil
- Position: Left back

Youth career
- Internacional

Senior career*
Years	Team	Apps	(Gls)
1961–1970	Internacional		
1962	→ Atlético Paranaense (loan)		
1971–1972	Corinthians	10	(0)

International career
1966–1968	Brazil	11	(1)
- * Club domestic league appearances and goals as of 18 February 2024

Sadi Schwerdt (15 December 1942 – 27 February 2019) was a Brazilian professional footballer who played as a left back.

== Career ==
Sadi began his career at SC Internacional, a club for which he played from 1961 to 1970, becoming state champion three times. He also had spells at Athletico Paranaense and SC Corinthians.

== International career ==
Sadi played for the Brazilian national team from 1966 to 1968, participating in the Bernardo O'Higgins Cup, Rio Branco Cup and Jorge Chavez/Santos Dumont Cup. He made 11 appearances and scored 1 goal, 9 June 1968, against Uruguay.

== Personal life ==
After retiring from football, Sadi Schwerdt was a councilor in the city of Porto Alegre from 1973 to 1982.

== Honours ==
Internacional

- Campeonato Gaúcho: 1961, 1969, 1970

Brazil

- Copa Bernardo O'Higgins: 1966 (shared)
- Copa Rio Branco: 1967 (shared), 1968
- Taça Jorge Chávez/Santos Dumont: 1968

== Death ==
Sadi died on 27 February 2019 in Porto Alegre, aged 76.
