= Nelson Sanhueza =

Chilean footballer (born 1952)

Personal information
- Full name: Nelson Humberto Sanhueza Graavendaal
- Date of birth: 1 May 1952 (age 74)
- Place of birth: Santiago, Chile
- Position: Defender

Youth career
- 1969–1970: Universidad Católica

Senior career*
Years	Team	Apps	(Gls)
1971–1977	Universidad Católica	81	(10)
1977–1979	Monterrey		
1979–1980	Universidad Católica	25	(1)
1980–1982	Atlético Potosino		
1982–1985	Puebla		
1985–1987	Atlético Potosino		
1987–1988	Correcaminos UAT		

International career
1974	Chile B	1	(0)
1976	Chile	2	(0)

Managerial career
- Irlandés FC
- Toros Neza (assistant)
- 1997: Tigres UANL (assistant)
- 2000: Toros Neza
- Atlético Zacatepec
- 2004: Correcaminos UAT
- 2010: Correcaminos UAT
- 2019: Jabatos Nuevo León
- * Club domestic league appearances and goals

Nelson Humberto Sanhueza Graavendaal (born 1 May 1952) is a Chilean former professional footballer who played as a defender for clubs in Chile and Mexico.

== Club career ==
A product of the Universidad Católica youth system, he made appearances for the club from 1971 to 1977, with a stint in the Segunda División from 1974 to 1975, winning the league title in 1975. He also played for them in 1979–80 after a stint in Mexico.

In Mexico, he played for Monterrey (1977–79), where he came thanks to the Chilean coach Fernando Riera, Atlético Potosino (1980–82, 1985–87), where he coincided with his compatriot Luis Castro, Puebla (1982–1985) and Correcaminos UAT (1987–88).

As some achievements, he scored the goal number thousand for Monterrey and won the league title with Puebla in the 1982–83 season.

== International career ==
Sanhueza made two appearances in friendly matches for the Chile senior team in 1976. Previously, in 1974 he played in a 1–0 win against Argentina where both squads were made up by players from the second level of each league system.

== Coaching career ==
Sanhueza began his career as coach of Irlandés FC and as assistant in both Toros Neza and Tigres UANL. As head coach, he has led Toros Neza, Atlético Zacatepec, Correcaminos UAT and Jabatos Nuevo León.

== Political views ==
Sanhueza took part of Acto de Chacarillas, a ritualized youth event held in the summit of Cerro Chacarillas in Santiago, Chile on 9 July 1977 organised by the military dictatorship of Chile.

== Honours ==
Universidad Católica

- Segunda División de Chile: 1975

Puebla

- Primera División de México: 1982–83
