= Jair Baylón =

Peruvian footballer (born 1989)

Personal information
- Full name: Jahirsino Julio Baylón Yglesias
- Date of birth: 26 February 1989 (age 37)
- Place of birth: Pueblo Libre, Peru
- Height: 1.84 m (6 ft 0 in)
- Position: Striker

Team information
- Current team: Sport Chavelines

Youth career
- 2005–2006: Alianza Lima

Senior career*
Years	Team	Apps	(Gls)
2006–2007	Alianza Lima	0	(0)
2007	Braga	0	(0)
2008	→ Alianza Lima (loan)	9	(0)
2009	→ Gil Vicente (loan)	?	(?)
2009	→ Univ. San Martín (loan)	3	(0)
2011	Tanque Sisley	3	(0)
2011	Sport Boys	13	(2)
2012	Sport Huancayo	24	(3)
2012–2013	Universitario	12	(0)
2013	Unión Comercio	8	(1)
2014	Real Garcilaso	5	(0)
2014	Unión Comercio	3	(0)
2015	UT Cajamarca	18	(0)
2016	Defensor La Bocana	23	(7)
2017	Alianza Atlético	10	(2)
2017	César Vallejo	3	(1)
2018	Academia Cantolao	3	(0)
2019–	Sport Chavelines		

International career
2007	Peru U-23		
- * Club domestic league appearances and goals as of 22:04, 16 June 2019 (UTC)

Jahirsino Julio Baylón Yglesias (born 26 February 1989), commonly known as Jair Baylón, is a Peruvian footballer who plays as a forward for Sport Chavelines Juniors. He is also the son of Julio Baylón.

== Club career ==
Jahirsino Baylón was born in Lima, Peru on February 26, 1989, where he started playing Football just when he started walking as a child in the streets of Lima with local school boys. His family quickly put him into Alianza Lima's youth academy where he excelled through the ranks, and after just one season he then signed for Portuguese Liga club SC Braga.

SC Braga manager Jorge Costa said that the youngster is part of his plans to launch an assault on the UEFA Cup, in which Baylón will be playing for with the club.

He admits after his father's death he became more interested in football, saying he would push himself at the extremes, and he also stated that since his father died he has seen football as a way to be connected to his father.

Baylón made his professional debut for Alianza Lima on 30 March 2008.

In 2019, Baylon joined Sport Chavelines Juniors.
