= Fernando Mellán =

Peruvian footballer (born 1942)

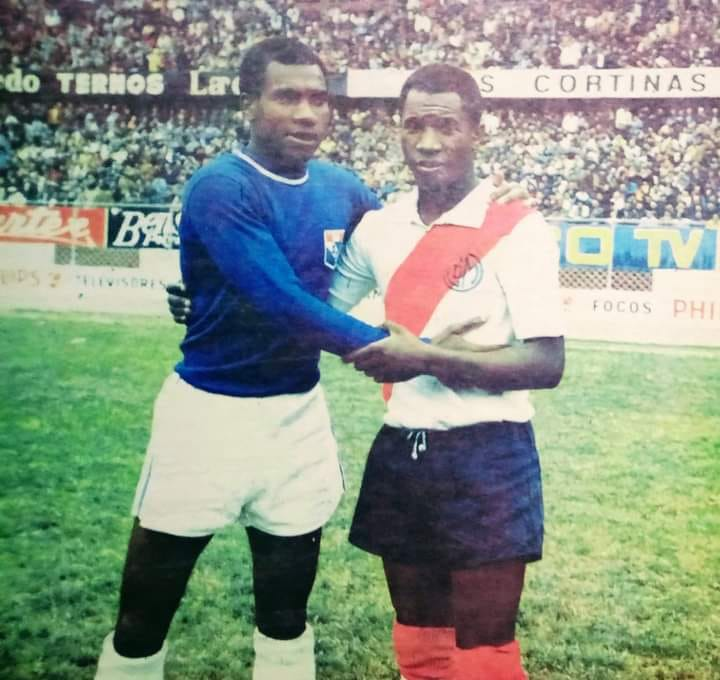
- Fernando (left) with his brother Manuel (right) in 1972

Personal information
- Full name: Elías Fernando Mellán Heredia
- Date of birth: 30 May 1942 (age 84)
- Place of birth: Pisco, Ica, Peru
- Position: Defender

Youth career
- ???–1962: Alianza Lima

Senior career*
Years	Team	Apps	(Gls)
1963–1967	Mariscal Sucre		
1968–1974	Sporting Cristal		
1975	Deportivo Municipal		
1976–1979	Sporting Cristal		

International career
1964	Peru	3	(0)
- * Club domestic league appearances and goals

Elías Fernando Mellán Heredia (born 30 May 1942) is a retired Peruvian football player and manager. Nicknamed "El Cóndor", he was primarily known playing as a defender for Sporting Cristal throughout the 1970s, earning four titles with the club throughout his career.

== Club career ==
Mellán began his career within the youth sector of Alianza Lima before he began his senior career with Mariscal Sucre in 1963 where he would experience the club being promoted for the 1966 Torneo Descentralizado. He would then play for Sporting Cristal after he would gain the support of club manager Didi as the Brazilian would recognize Mellán for his talent on field as well as being supported by friend and club legend Alberto Gallardo. He would play alongside players such as Eloy Campos, Orlando de la Torre, Roberto Elías, Víctor Fernández and Anselmo Ruíz as the club would later win the 1968 Torneo Descentralizado. He would earn the nickname "Cóndor" through his rough and vehement style of stealing balls away from strikers without any bad intentions. This nickname would later be officialized during a match against Peñarol in the Copa Libertadores as a day following the match, a Uruguayan newspaper would refer to him as such.

He would experience his second title with the club as he would be a part of the winning squad of the 1970 Torneo Descentralizado alongside veterans of the 1970 FIFA World Cup such as Luis Rubiños, de La Torre, Campos, Ramón Mifflin and Gallardo under manager Sabino Bártoli. This would result in the qualification for the 1971 Copa Libertadores where he would participate in the infamous match against Boca Juniors at La Bombonera that would culminate in a brawl in where everyone except Boca defender Julio Meléndez and the two goalkeepers would be expulsed from the match as Mellán would end up hospitalized following the match. He would achieve his third title through the 1972 Torneo Descentralizado under manager Marcos Calderón. Following a brief spell with Deportivo Municipal for the 1975 Torneo Descentralizado, he returned to La Celeste where he would achieve his last title in the 1979 Torneo Descentralizado alongside Héctor Chumpitaz as well as younger players such as Rubén Toribio Díaz, Eleazar Soria and José Navarro Aramburu under Calderón.

== International career ==
Mellán would play for Peru for the 1964 CONMEBOL Pre-Olympic Tournament under managers Marinho de Oliveira and Rafael Castillo as Peru would narrowly miss qualification for the 1964 Summer Olympics.

== Managerial career ==
Following his retirement from the 1979 Torneo Descentralizado, he would immediately become a trainer for reserve and youth players as he would assume responsibilities in 1980 for Esther Grande within the Liga Rímac, later training up potential prospects within Sporting Cristal alongside former teammate and friend Alberto Gallardo as they would oversee the club winning the 1988 Torneo Descentralizado. Throughout his career, he has trained players such as Roberto Palacios, Pablo Zegarra, Percy Olivares, Miguel Miranda, Martín Hidalgo, Andrés Mendoza, Erick Torres and Carlos Lobatón with Mendoza inheriting his nickname of "Cóndor". He still continues to train players of the youth sector of Sporting Cristal as of 2026.
