= Alberto Belén =

Argentine footballer

Personal information
- Date of birth: 22 June 1917
- Position: Midfielder

International career
Years	Team	Apps	(Gls)
1940–1943	Argentina	8	(2)

Alberto Belén (born 22 June 1917, date of death unknown) was an Argentine footballer. He played in eight matches for the Argentina national football team from 1940 to 1943. He was also part of Argentina's squad for the 1941 South American Championship.
