= Domingo Farfán (footballer) =

Peruvian footballer (1957–2016)

Personal information
- Full name: Domingo Vicente Farfán Gonzáles
- Date of birth: 22 January 1957
- Place of birth: Tambo de Mora, Peru
- Date of death: 13 March 2016 (aged 59)
- Place of death: Lima, Peru
- Position: Forward

Senior career*
Years	Team	Apps	(Gls)
1981–1983	Sport Boys		
1984	Octavio Espinosa		
1985	Juventud La Joya		
1986	Octavio Espinosa		
1987–1988	Unión Huaral		
1989	LDU Quito		
1989–1993	Unión Huaral		

International career
1988–1989	Peru	5	(1)
- * Club domestic league appearances and goals

Domingo Vicente Farfán Gonzáles (22 January 1957 – 13 March 2016) was a Peruvian footballer who played as a forward.

== Biography ==
=== Club career ===
Domingo Farfán made his Peruvian first division debut for Sport Boys of Callao on 21 March 1981, against Sporting Cristal. He scored his first goal against Deportivo Municipal on 8 August 1982. Having lost his starting position in 1983, he moved to Octavio Espinosa of Ica in 1984. After a stint with Juventud La Joya of Chancay in 1985, he returned to Octavio Espinosa in 1986.

In 1987, he joined Unión Huaral, where he won the Peruvian championship in 1989. Unfortunately, he was relegated with the club in 1991. He ended his career in 1993, but not before playing abroad, for LDU Quito of Ecuador in 1989.

=== International career ===
Peruvian international Domingo Farfán played five matches for the national team between 1988 and 1989, scoring one goal.

=== Death ===
Farfán died of a heart attack on 13 March 2016.

== Honours ==
Unión Huaral

- Torneo Descentralizado: 1989
- Peruvian Segunda División: 1992
