= Cornelio Heredia =

Peruvian footballer (1920–2004)

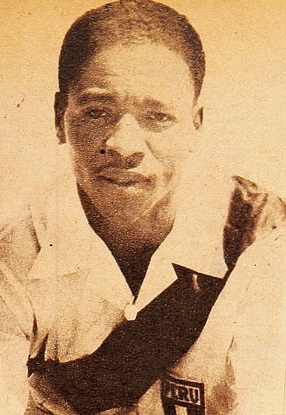

Personal information
- Full name: Cornelio Heredia Zambrano
- Date of birth: 16 October 1920
- Place of birth: Chincha Alta, Peru
- Date of death: 29 September 2004 (aged 83)
- Place of death: Lima, Peru
- Position: Midfielder

Senior career*
Years	Team	Apps	(Gls)
1946	Alfonso Ugarte (Chiclín)		
1946–1958	Alianza Lima		
1959–1960	Ciclista Lima		

International career
1947–1956	Peru	36	(4)
- * Club domestic league appearances and goals

Cornelio Heredia Zambrano (16 October 1920 – 29 September 2004) was a Peruvian professional footballer who played as midfielder.

Nicknamed El Brujo (the wizard), he is one of the key players for Alianza Lima

== Biography ==
=== Playing career ===
He began his professional football career relatively late (at the age of 26), but this didn't prevent him from becoming one of the idols of Alianza Lima, where he played for almost his entire career (from 1946 to 1958). He won four league titles there in 1948, 1952, 1954 and 1955. He finished his career at Ciclista Lima, where he played from 1959 to 1960.

A Peruvian international from 1947 to 1956, Cornelio Heredia participated in five South American Football Championships (1947, 1949, 1953, 1955, and 1956), finishing third in 1949 and 1955.

=== Death ===
He died on September 29, 2004, in the La Victoria district of Lima.

== Statistics ==
=== International ===
Appearances and goals by national team and year
National team	Year	Apps	Goals
Peru	1947	6	0
Peru	1949	4	1
Peru	1952	5	0
Peru	1953	8	2
Peru	1954	2	0
Peru	1955	5	1
Peru	1956	6	0
Total		36	4

Scores and results table. Peru's goal tally first:

List of international goals scored by Cornelio Heredia
No.	Date	Venue	Opponent	Score	Result	Competition
1.	27 April 1949	Vila Belmiro, Santos, Brazil	Bolivia	3–0	3–0	1949 South American Championship
2.	28 July 1953	Estadio Nacional, Lima, Peru	Chile	2–0	5–0	Copa del Pacífico
3.	28 July 1953	Estadio Nacional, Lima, Peru	Chile	5–0	5–0	Copa del Pacífico
4.	6 March 1955	Estadio Nacional, Santiago, Chile	Chile	3–4	4–5	1955 South American Championship

== Honours ==
Alianza Lima

- Peruvian Primera División: 1948, 1952, 1954, 1955
