= Carlos Gómez Sánchez =

Peruvian footballer (1923–1980)

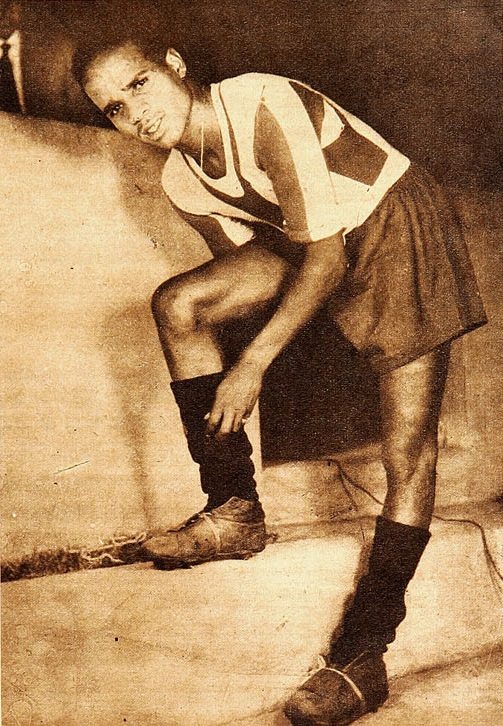

Personal information
- Date of birth: 4 October 1923
- Place of birth: Lima, Peru
- Date of death: 21 September 1980 (aged 56)
- Position: Forward

Youth career
- Santiago Barranco

Senior career*
Years	Team	Apps	(Gls)
1943–1947	Alianza Lima		
1948	Boca Juniors	21	(7)
1949	América de Cali		
1950–1952	Alianza Lima		

International career
1947–1949	Peru	11	(5)

Managerial career
- 1961: Alianza Lima
- * Club domestic league appearances and goals

Carlos Gómez Sánchez (4 October 1923 – 21 September 1980) was a Peruvian professional footballer who played as forward.

Nicknamed El Tábano (the horsefly), he is the older brother of Óscar Gómez Sánchez, a famous Peruvian footballer of the 1950s and 1960s.

== Biography ==
=== Playing career ===
Trained at Santiago Barranco, Gómez Sánchez joined Alianza Lima in 1943 at the age of 20. He transferred to Boca Juniors in Argentina in 1948. There, he scored seven goals in 21 matches. In 1949, he played for América de Cali in Colombia before returning to Alianza the following year. Although he never won a title with Alianza Lima, his 25 goals in 132 appearances made him one of the club's idols. In 1952, he was forced to retire at the age of 29 following a tibia-fibula injury.

Carlos Gómez Sánchez was a Peruvian international 11 times between 1947 and 1949. He scored five goals, all in the South American Championship (three in 1947 and two in 1949).

=== Managerial career ===
He was briefly coach of Alianza Lima in 1961.

== Statistics ==
=== International ===
Scores and results table. Peru's goal tally first:

List of international goals scored by Carlos Gómez Sánchez
No.	Date	Venue	Opponent	Score	Result	Competition
1.	11 December 1947	Estadio George Capwell, Guayaquil, Ecuador	Argentina	1–0	2–3	1947 South American Championship
2.	23 December 1947	Estadio George Capwell, Guayaquil, Ecuador	Colombia	3–1	5–1	1947 South American Championship
3.	23 December 1947	Estadio George Capwell, Guayaquil, Ecuador	Colombia	5–1	5–1	1947 South American Championship
4.	4 May 1949	Estádio General Severiano, Rio de Janeiro, Brazil	Uruguay	3–0	4–3	1949 South American Championship
5.	4 May 1949	Estádio General Severiano, Rio de Janeiro, Brazil	Uruguay	4–1	4–3	1949 South American Championship
