= Óscar Gómez Sánchez =

Peruvian footballer (1934-2008)

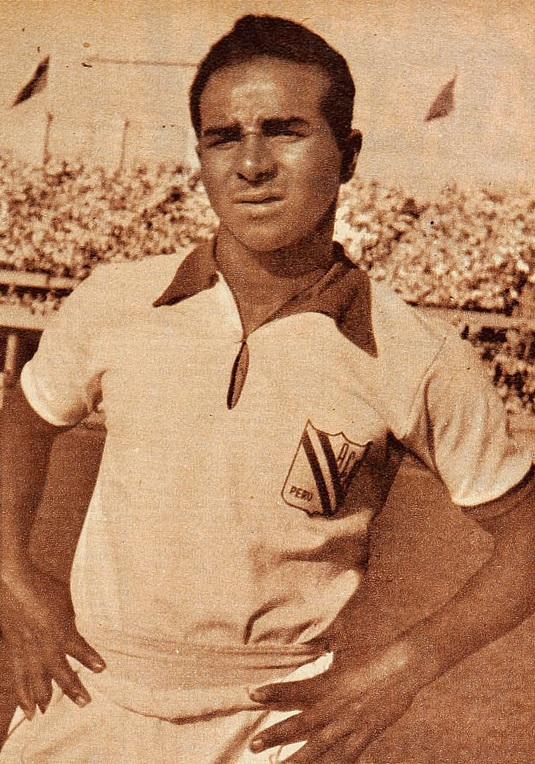

Personal information
- Full name: Óscar Gómez Sánchez
- Date of birth: October 31, 1934
- Place of birth: Lima, Peru
- Date of death: March 4, 2008 (aged 73)
- Place of death: Lima, Peru
- Position: Forward

Senior career*
| Years | Team | Apps | (Gls) |
| 1951–1958 | Alianza Lima | 104 | (89) |
| 1959–1960 | River Plate | 42 | (3) |
| 1961–1963 | Gimnasia y Esgrima LP | 71 | (14) |
| 1964 | Sporting Cristal | 5 | (1) |
| 1965 | Defensor Arica | | |

International career
| 1953–1959 | Peru | 26 | (14) |
- * Club domestic league appearances and goals

Óscar "Huaqui" Gómez Sánchez (*Lima, 31 October 1934 – †Lima, 4 March 2008) was a Peruvian football player.

== Club career ==
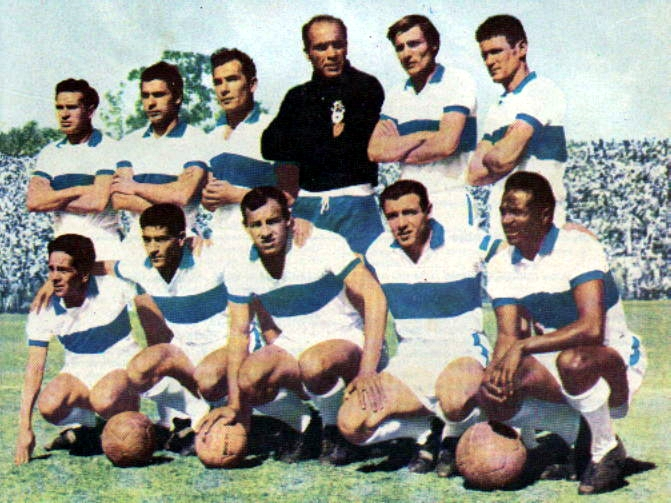
Gómez Sánchez in Gimnasia y Esgrima La Plata in 1962

He made his professional debut with Alianza Lima, where he won three Peruvian championships in 1952, 1954, and 1955, alongside other team stars such as Heraclio Paredes, Félix Fuentes, Emilio Vargas, and Juan Emilio Salinas.

In 1959, he signed with River Plate (interestingly, his older brother Carlos Gómez Sánchez had transferred to Boca Juniors in the late 1940s). He spent nearly five years in Argentina, first with River Plate (1959-1960), where he was runner-up in 1960, sharing the spotlight with Ermindo Onega, Norberto Menéndez, Roberto Zárate, Juan Carlos Sarnari, and his compatriot Juan Joya. From 1961 to 1963, he played for Gimnasia y Esgrima LP. He was part of one of the club's best teams, the 1962 squad, alongside Luis Ciaccia, Eliseo Prado, Alfredo Rojas, and Diego Francisco Bayo.

Returning to Peru in 1964, he played for Sporting Cristal before retiring in 1965 at Defensor Arica.

== International career ==
Gómez Sánchez earned 26 caps for Peru (1953-1959), scoring 14 goals, 10 of which were scored in the Copa América. He remains the third-highest Peruvian scorer in the competition's history, behind Teodoro Fernández (15 goals) and Paolo Guerrero (14).

Having participated in four editions of the Copa América (1953, 1955, 1956, and 1959), he also had the opportunity to play in the 1956 Panamerican Championship in Mexico. In April 1957, he played in the 1958 World Cup qualifying playoff against Brazil (two matches, no goals).

== Personal ==
Gómez Sánchez died 4 March 2008 of cancer in Lima.

== Honours ==
Alianza Lima

- Peruvian Primera División (3): 1952, 1954, 1955
