= 1958 FIFA World Cup qualification (CONMEBOL – Group 1) =

Football tournament

Due to the withdrawal of Venezuela, the two teams in this group played against each other on a home-and-away basis. The winner Brazil qualified for the sixth FIFA World Cup held in Sweden.

== Table ==
Pos	Team	Pld	W	D	L	GF	GA	GR	Pts	Qualification	Brazil national football team	Peru national football team	(Venezuela)
1	Brazil	2	1	1	0	2	1	2.000	3	Qualification to 1958 FIFA World Cup	—	1–0	
2	Peru	2	0	1	1	1	2	0.500	1		1–1	—	—
3	Venezuela	0	0	0	0	0	0	—	0	Withdrew	—	—	—

Source: FIFA

== Matches ==
13 April 1957

Peru	1 – 1	Brazil
Terry 38'	Report	Índio 47'

Referee: Rodriguez (Uruguay)

21 April 1957

Brazil	1 – 0	Peru
Didi 11'	Report

Referee: Marino (Uruguay)
