= Carlos Gonzales (footballer, born 1945) =

Peruvian footballer (born 1945)

Personal information
- Full name: Carlos Ignacio Gonzales Pajuelo
- Date of birth: 31 July 1945 (age 81)
- Place of birth: Lima, Peru
- Position: Forward

Youth career
- Alianza Lima

Senior career*
Years	Team	Apps	(Gls)
1962–1973	Sporting Cristal		
1974–1975	Juan Aurich		
1976–1977	Atlético Chalaco		
1977	CNI		
1978	Barcelona S.C.		
1979	CNI		

International career
1964	Peru under-20		
1966–1967	Peru	3	(1)
- * Club domestic league appearances and goals

Carlos Ignacio Gonzales Pajuelo (born on 30 July 1945) is a Peruvian footballer who played as a striker.

== Biography ==
=== Club career ===
Carlos Gonzales Pajuelo began his career in the youth divisions of Alianza Lima but made his professional debut with Sporting Cristal in 1962, where he won the Peruvian league title three times (1968, 1970, and 1972). He also played 24 Copa Libertadores matches for Sporting Cristal, scoring 5 goals.

He played for Juan Aurich and Atlético Chalaco, and retired with CNI of Iquitos. He also played for Barcelona S.C. of Guayaquil in Ecuador.

=== International career ===
Gonzales participated in the 1964 South American U-20 Championship with the Peruvian U20 team. He made his debut for the senior national team on 4 June 1966, in a friendly match against Brazil (a 0–4 defeat). He scored his first goal in his third and final match for the national team on 28 July 1967 against Japan (1–0 victory).

== Honours ==
Sporting Cristal

- Torneo Descentralizado (3): 1968, 1970, 1972
