= Nemesio Mosquera =

Peruvian footballer (1936–2019)

Personal information
- Full name: Nemesio Edulivio Mosquera Jiménez
- Date of birth: 19 December 1936
- Place of birth: Lima, Peru
- Date of death: 27 June 2019 (aged 82)

International career
Years	Team	Apps	(Gls)
1963	Peru	5	(1)

Nemesio Edulivio Mosquera Jiménez (19 December 1936 – 27 June 2019) was a Peruvian footballer. He played in five matches for the Peru national football team in 1963. He was also part of Peru's squad for the 1963 South American Championship. Mosquera died on 27 June 2019, at the age of 82.
