= José Urruzmendi =

Uruguayan footballer (born 1944)

Personal information
- Full name: José Eusebio Urruzmendi Aycaguer
- Date of birth: 25 August 1944 (age 82)
- Place of birth: Uruguay
- Position: Striker

Senior career*
Years	Team	Apps	(Gls)
1964–1968	Nacional		
1968	Independiente	9	(2)
1969	Internacional		

International career
1965–1967	Uruguay	21	(8)
- * Club domestic league appearances and goals

José Eusebio Urruzmendi Aycaguer (born 25 August 1944) is a Uruguayan football striker who played for Uruguay in the 1966 FIFA World Cup. He also played for Club Nacional de Football.
