= Julio Baylón =

Peruvian footballer (1947–2004)

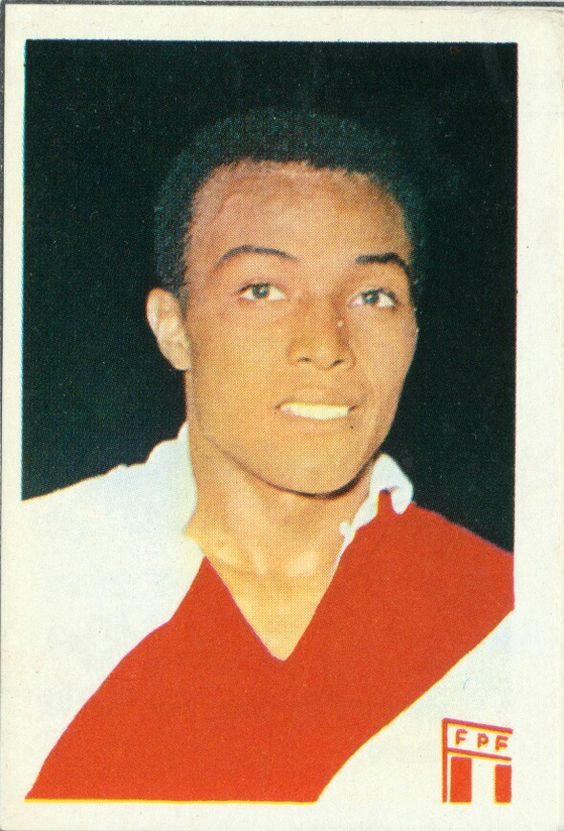
- Baylón in 1970

Personal information
- Full name: Julio Alberto Temístocles Baylon Aragonés
- Date of birth: 10 December 1947
- Place of birth: Changuillo District, Peru
- Date of death: 9 February 2004 (aged 56)
- Height: 1.83 m (6 ft 0 in)
- Position: Right winger

Senior career*
Years	Team	Apps	(Gls)
1966–1970	Alianza Lima		
1973–1974	Fortuna Köln	13	(1)
1975–1976	Fortuna Köln	12	(3)
1976–1977	FC Homburg	19	(3)
1977–1978	Fortuna Köln	21	(4)
1978–1980	Rochester Lancers	31	(7)

International career
1968–1972	Peru	32	(2)
- * Club domestic league appearances and goals

Julio Alberto Temístocles Baylon Aragonés (10 December 1947 – 9 February 2004) was a Peruvian footballer who played as a right winger.

== Club career ==
Baylon was born in Pisco. From 1978 to 1980, He played for the Rochester Lancers of the North American Soccer League (NASL) as well as nine games for the New York Arrows of the Major Indoor Soccer League.

== International career ==
Baylón made 32 appearances for the Peru national team.

== Personal life ==
He is the father of Jair Baylon and uncle of Sandro Baylon.
