= Pedro Araya Toro =

Chilean footballer (born 1942)

Pedro Araya
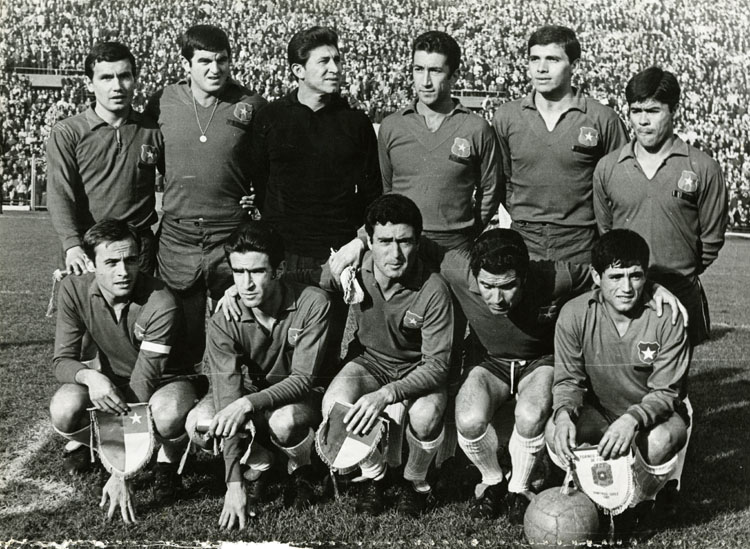
- Chile in 1966 with Araya in the last position

Personal information
- Full name: Pedro Damián Araya Toro
- Date of birth: 23 January 1942 (age 84)
- Place of birth: Santiago, Chile
- Height: 1.62 m (5 ft 4 in)
- Position: Right winger

Youth career
- Juventud Católica
- Universidad de Chile

Senior career*
Years	Team	Apps	(Gls)
1963–1971	Universidad de Chile	215	(82)
1971–1973	Real San Luis	?	(24)
1973–1978	Atlas	92	(18)

International career
1964–1971	Chile	52	(12)

Managerial career
- 1987–1988: Atlético Potosino
- * Club domestic league appearances and goals

Pedro Damián Araya Toro (born 23 January 1942), known as Pedro Araya, is a Chilean former football player who played as a right winger.

== Playing career ==
As a youth player, Araya played for Juventud Católica from Lo Barnechea before joining Universidad de Chile. He made his professional debut in a Chilean Primera División match against Deportes La Serena in July 1963 and scored by first time in his second official match against Unión San Felipe.

On 6 April 1965, Araya was one of the constituent footballers of SIFUP, the trade union of professionales footballers in Chile, alongside fellows such as Luis Eyzaguirre, Manuel Astorga, Juan Rodríguez Vega, among others.

Toro represented the Chile national team at the 1966 World Cup, and played all three matches for the squad. Between 1964 and 1972, he was capped 65 times and scored 14 goals for his country.

A skilled player, Araya played as a "number 7", the number is associated with an "outside" forward. Along with Campos and Carlos Leonel Sanchez formed an offensive triplet of the 'Ballet Azul'. His career also continues in Mexico playing for the San Luis de Potosi and Atlas de Guadalajara.

In America's Cup in Montevideo, 1967, Araya was called by the Uruguayan press: The Chilean Garrincha.

== Coaching career ==
He graduated as a football manager in Mexico and coached Atlético Potosino in the 1987–88 season, with his compatriot Luis Cholo Castro in the squad.

Back in Chile, he started an eponymous football academy based in Nebraska neighborhood in Lo Barnechea commune.

== Honors ==
Universidad de Chile

- Chilean Primera División (4): 1964, 1965, 1967, 1969

Individual

- Best Player of the Season by Gol y Gol (2): 1966, 1967

== Personal life ==
Araya married a woman from San Luis Potosí, Mexico, where he would move after retiring from football.
