= Roberto Elías =

Peruvian footballer (1940–2019)

Personal information
- Full name: Roberto Elías Millares
- Date of birth: 7 June 1940
- Place of birth: Lima, Peru
- Date of death: 21 March 2019 (aged 78)
- Place of death: Lima, Peru

Senior career*
Years	Team	Apps	(Gls)
1960-1971	Sporting Cristal		
1971-1972	José Gálvez		
1972-1973	Alianza Lima		
1973-1975	Juan Aurich		
1975-1977	Defensor Lima		

International career
1963–1969	Peru	10	(0)
- * Club domestic league appearances and goals

Roberto Elías (7 June 1940 – 21 March 2019) was a Peruvian footballer. He was part of Peru's squad for the 1963 South American Championship. Elías died in Lima on 21 March 2019, at the age of 78.
