= Eloy Campos =

Peruvian footballer (born 1942)

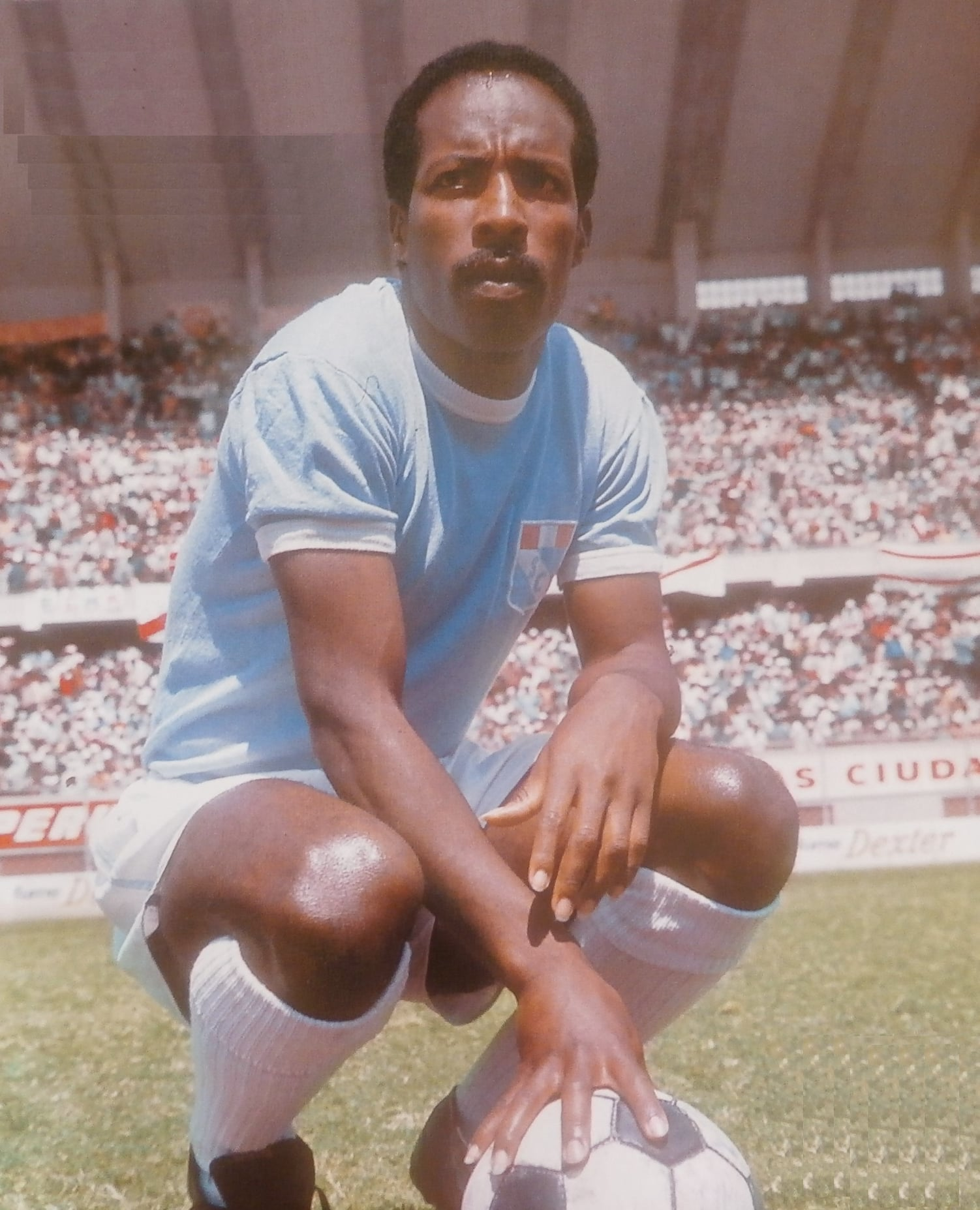
- Campos playing for Sporting Cristal

Personal information
- Full name: Ángel Eloy Campos Cleque
- Date of birth: 31 May 1942 (age 84)
- Place of birth: Ica, Peru
- Height: 1.72 m (5 ft 8 in)
- Position: Defender

Senior career*
Years	Team	Apps	(Gls)
1961–1972	Sporting Cristal		

International career
1963–1972	Peru	46	(0)
- * Club domestic league appearances and goals

Ángel Eloy Campos Cleque (born 31 May 1942) is a former Peruvian football defender, who played for the Peru national football team between 1963 and 1972, gaining 46 caps. He was part of Peru's squad for the 1960 Summer Olympics and the 1970 World Cup. At club level, Campos spent most of his career at Sporting Cristal.
